= List of V8SuperTourer races =

The first V8SuperTourer race was at Hampton Downs on February 18, 2012, with Greg Murphy taking the first ever race win.

Year	Round	Date	Circuit	Winner	Team	Car	Heat Winners
2012	1	17–19 February	Hampton Downs Motorsport Park	Greg Murphy	Mike Pero Racing	Holden VE Commodore	Greg Murphy; Greg Murphy; Ant Pedersen
2012	2	7–8 April	Powerbuilt Raceway	Fabian Coulthard	Mike Pero Racing	Holden VE Commodore	Fabian Coulthard; Fabian Coulthard; John McIntyre
2012	3	27–29 April	Manfeild Autocourse	Jonny Reid	International Motorsport	Ford FG Falcon	Jonny Reid; Jonny Reid; Greg Murphy
2012	4	1–3 June	Hampton Downs Motorsport Park	Scott McLaughlin	MPC Motorsport	Holden VE Commodore	Scott McLaughlin; Scott McLaughlin; Scott McLaughlin
2012	5	10–12 August	Taupo Motorsport Park	Scott McLaughlin; Jonathon Webb	MPC Motorsport	Holden VE Commodore	Nick Cassidy / Jack Perkins; Scott McLaughlin / Jonathon Webb
2012	6	26–28 October	Pukekohe Park Raceway	Greg Murphy; Jack Perkins	M3 Racing	Holden VE Commodore	Scott McLaughlin / Jonathon Webb; Greg Murphy / Jack Perkins; Greg Murphy / Jack Perkins
2012	7	23–25 November	Powerbuilt Raceway	Scott McLaughlin; Jonathon Webb	MPC Motorsport	Holden VE Commodore	Scott McLaughlin / Jonathon Webb; Daniel Gaunt / Andrew Waite
2013	1	15–17 February	Hampton Downs Motorsport Park	Greg Murphy	M3 Racing	Holden VE Commodore	Greg Murphy; Greg Murphy; Greg Murphy
2013	2	9–10 March	Powerbuilt Raceway	Daniel Gaunt	Tasman Motorsports	Ford FG Falcon	Daniel Gaunt; Daniel Gaunt; Ant Pedersen
2013	3	25–26 May	Pukekohe Park Raceway	Shane van Gisbergen	MPC Motorsport	Ford FG Falcon	Shane van Gisbergen; Shane van Gisbergen; Greg Murphy
2013	4	1 September	Ricoh Taupo Motorsport Park	Shane van Gisbergen	MPC Motorsport	Ford FG Falcon	Shane van Gisbergen; Ant Pedersen; Andy Booth
2013	5	28–29 September	Aegis Oils Waikato 400	Shane van Gisbergen; Alex Davison	MPC Motorsport	Ford FG Falcon	Greg Murphy / Jack Perkins; Tim Edgell / Lee Holdsworth; Ant Pedersen / Chaz Mostert
2013	6	19–20 October	Hampton 400	Ant Pedersen; Chaz Mostert	International Motorsport	Ford FG Falcon	Greg Murphy / Jack Perkins; Richard Moore / Tim Slade; Ant Pedersen / Chaz Mostert
2013	7	29 Nov-1 December	Mike Pero 500	Scott McLaughlin; James Moffat	Scott McLaughlin Racing	Holden VE Commodore	Shane van Gisbergen / Alex Davison; Tim Edgell / Lee Holdsworth; Scott McLaughlin / James Moffat
2014	1	25–26 January	Highlands Motorsport Park	Greg Murphy	M3 Racing	Holden VE Commodore	Greg Murphy; Greg Murphy; Greg Murphy
2014	2	8–9 February	Manfeild Autocourse	Greg Murphy	M3 Racing	Holden VE Commodore	Greg Murphy; Greg Murphy; Greg Murphy
2014	3	22–23 March	Pukekohe Park Raceway	Greg Murphy	M3 Racing	Holden VE Commodore	Greg Murphy; Angus Fogg; Greg Murphy
2014	4	25–27 April	Pukekohe Park Raceway	Greg Murphy	M3 Racing	Holden VE Commodore	Greg Murphy; Greg Murphy; Greg Murphy; Richard Moore

== Starts ==
=== Race starts ===
	Driver	Seasons	Starts
1	(New Zealand) Ant Pedersen	2012-2014	59
1	(New Zealand) Richard Moore	2012-2014	59
3	(New Zealand) Andre Heimgartner	2012-2014	57
4	(New Zealand) Greg Murphy	2012-2014	54
5	(New Zealand) Mitch Cunningham	2012-2014	47
6	(New Zealand) Paul Manuell	2012-2014	45
7	(New Zealand) John McIntyre	2012-2014	43
8	(New Zealand) Andy Booth	2012-2013	38
9	(New Zealand) Eddie Bell	2012-2014	36
10	(New Zealand) Scott McLaughlin	2012-2013	35

== Race wins ==
=== Total race wins ===
	Driver	Seasons	Wins
1	(New Zealand) Greg Murphy	2012-2014	22
2	(New Zealand) Shane van Gisbergen	2013-2014	8
3	(New Zealand) Scott McLaughlin	2012-2013	7
3	(New Zealand) Ant Pedersen	2012-2014	7
5	(Australia) Jack Perkins	2012-2014	5
6	(Australia) Simon Evans	2012-2014	4
7	(Australia) Jonathon Webb	2012-2013	3
7	(New Zealand) Daniel Gaunt	2012-2014	3
7	(New Zealand) Richard Moore	2012-2014	3
10	(New Zealand) Jonny Reid	2012-2014	2
10	(New Zealand) Fabian Coulthard	2012	2
10	(New Zealand) Tim Edgell	2012-2014	2
10	(Australia) Lee Holdsworth	2013	2
10	(Australia) Chaz Mostert	2013	2
10	(Australia) Tim Slade	2013-2014	2

=== Percentage wins ===
	Driver	Seasons	Entries	Wins	Percentage
1	(New Zealand) Fabian Coulthard	2012	3	2	66.66%
2	(New Zealand) Nick Cassidy	2012	2	1	50.00%
3	(New Zealand) Greg Murphy	2012-2014	48	22	48.83%
4	(Australia) James Moffat	2013	3	1	33.33%
5	(Australia) Jack Perkins	2012-2013	16	5	31.25%
6	(Australia) Jonathon Webb	2012-2013	13	3	23.07%
7	(Australia) Lee Holdsworth	2013	9	2	22.22%
7	(Australia) Chaz Mostert	2013	9	2	22.22%
9	(New Zealand) Scott McLaughlin	2012-2013	35	7	20.00%
10	(New Zealand) Shane van Gisbergen	2013	21	4	19.04%

=== Most wins in a season ===
	Driver	Season	Wins
1	(New Zealand) Greg Murphy	2014	11
2	(New Zealand) Greg Murphy	2013	6
2	(New Zealand) Scott McLaughlin	2012	6
4	(New Zealand) Greg Murphy	2012	5
5	(New Zealand) Ant Pedersen	2013	4
5	(New Zealand) Shane van Gisbergen	2013	4

=== Most race wins at the same track ===
	Driver	Wins	Track
1	(New Zealand) Greg Murphy	8	Pukekohe Park Raceway
2	(New Zealand) Greg Murphy	7	Hampton Downs Motorsport Park
3	(New Zealand) Greg Murphy	4	Manfeild Autocourse
4	(New Zealand) Greg Murphy	3	Highlands Motorsport Park
4	(New Zealand) Scott McLaughlin	3	Hampton Downs Motorsport Park
4	(New Zealand) Ant Pedersen	3	Hampton Downs Motorsport Park
4	(New Zealand) Shane van Gisbergen	3	Pukekohe Park Raceway

=== Most consecutive race wins ===
	Driver	Season(s)	Wins	Consecutive races won
1	(New Zealand) Greg Murphy	2014	7	2014 Highlands Motorsport Park Race 1 - 2014 Pukekohe Park Raceway Race 1
2	(New Zealand) Greg Murphy	2014	4	2014 Pukekohe Park Raceway Race 3 - 2014 Auckland 400 Race 3
3	(New Zealand) Greg Murphy	2013	3	2013 Hampton Downs Motorsport Park Race 1 - Race 3
3	(New Zealand) Scott McLaughlin	2012	3	2012 Hampton Downs Motorsport Park Race 1 - Race 3
5	(New Zealand) Greg Murphy	2012	2	2012 Hampton Downs Motorsport Park Race 1 - Race 2
5	(New Zealand) Greg Murphy	2012	2	2012 Pukekohe 500 Race 2 - Race 3
5	(New Zealand) Scott McLaughlin	2012	2	2012 Taupo Motorsport Park Race 2 - 2012 Pukekohe 500 Race 1
5	(New Zealand) Jonny Reid	2012	2	2012 Manfeild Autocourse Race 1 - Race 2
5	(New Zealand) Fabian Coulthard	2012	2	2012 Mike Pero Motorsport Park Race 1 - Race 2
5	(New Zealand) Shane van Gisbergen	2013	2	2013 Pukekohe Park Raceway Race 1 - Race 2
5	(New Zealand) Daniel Gaunt	2013	2	2013 Mike Pero Motorsport Park Race 1 - Race 2

=== Youngest winners ===
	Driver	Age	Race
1	(New Zealand) Nick Cassidy	18 years, 0 months, 14 days	Race 1 Taupo Motorsport Park 2012
2	(New Zealand) Scott McLaughlin	18 years, 11 months, 22 days	Race 1 Hampton Downs Motorsport Park 2012
3	(Australia) Chaz Mostert	21 years, 5 months, 19 days	Race 3 Hampton Downs Motorsport Park 2013
4	(New Zealand) Richard Moore	21 years, 10 months, 19 days	Race 2 Hampton Downs Motorsport Park 2013
5	(New Zealand) Andrew Waite	23 years, 4 months, 22 days	Race 2 Powerbuilt Tools Raceway 2012

=== Oldest winners ===
	Driver	Age	Race
1	(New Zealand) Angus Fogg	46 years, 6 months, 25 days	Race 2 Pukekohe Park Raceway 2014
2	(New Zealand) Greg Murphy	41 years, 8 months, 4 days	Race 3 ITM Auckland 500 2014
3	(New Zealand) Andy Booth	39 years, 3 months, 5 days	Race 3 Taupo Motorsport Park 2013
4	(New Zealand) John McIntyre	35 years, 0 months, 29 days	Race 3 Powerbuilt Tools Raceway 2012
5	(Australia) Alex Davison	34 years, 0 months, 27 days	Race 1 Pukekohe 500 2013

== Event wins ==
=== Total event wins ===
	Driver	Seasons	Wins
1	(New Zealand) Greg Murphy	2012-2014	7
2	(New Zealand) Scott McLaughlin	2012-2013	4
2	(New Zealand) Shane van Gisbergen	2013-2014	4
4	(Australia) Jonathon Webb	2012-2013	2
5	(New Zealand) Jonny Reid	2012-2014	1
5	(New Zealand) Fabian Coulthard	2012	1
5	(Australia) Jack Perkins	2012-2014	1
5	(New Zealand) Daniel Gaunt	2012-2014	1
5	(Australia) Alex Davison	2012-2013	1
5	(Australia) James Moffat	2013	1
5	(New Zealand) Ant Pedersen	2012-2014	1
5	(Australia) Chaz Mostert	2013	1
5	(New Zealand) Simon Evans	2012-2014	1
5	(New Zealand) Richard Moore	2012-2014	1
5	(Australia) Tim Slade	2013-2014	1

== Pole positions ==
=== Total pole positions ===
	Driver	Seasons	Poles
1	(New Zealand) Scott McLaughlin	2012-2013	8
2	(New Zealand) Ant Pedersen	2012-2014	6
3	(New Zealand) Greg Murphy	2012-2014	4
4	(New Zealand) Jonny Reid	2012-2013	1
4	(New Zealand) Fabian Coulthard	2012	1
4	(New Zealand) Kayne Scott	2012-2013	1
4	(New Zealand) Chris van der Drift	2012	1
4	(New Zealand) Shane van Gisbergen	2013	1
4	(New Zealand) Richard Moore	2012-2014	1
4	(New Zealand) Tim Edgell	2012-2014	1

== Podium Finishes ==
=== Total podium finishes ===
	Driver	Seasons	Podiums
1	(New Zealand) Greg Murphy	2012-2014	40
2	(New Zealand) Richard Moore	2012-2014	19
3	(New Zealand) Ant Pedersen	2012-2014	18
4	(New Zealand) Scott McLaughlin	2012-2013	17
5	(Australia) Jack Perkins	2012-2014	15
6	(New Zealand) Simon Evans	2012-2014	14
7	(New Zealand) Shane van Gisbergen	2013-2014	13
8	(New Zealand) John McIntyre	2012-2014	10
9	(Australia) Jonathon Webb	2012-2013	8
10	(New Zealand) Andy Booth	2012-2013	7

== Team records ==
=== Wins ===
==== Total race wins ====
	Team	Seasons	Wins
1	(New Zealand) **M3 Racing**	2012–2014	28
2	(Australia) MPC Motorsport	2012–2013	10
3	(New Zealand) **International Motorsport**	2012–2014	7
4	(New Zealand) **Team 4**	2012–2014	4
5	(New Zealand) **Tasman Motorsports Group**	2012–2014	3
6	(New Zealand) **Edgell Performance Racing**	2012–2014	2
7	(New Zealand) **Cunningham Racing**	2012–2014	1

==== Total Round wins ====
	Team	Seasons	Wins
1	(New Zealand) **M3 Racing**	2012–2014	9
2	(Australia) MPC Motorsport	2012–2013	6
3	(New Zealand) **International Motorsport**	2012–2014	2
4	(New Zealand) **Tasman Motorsports Group**	2012–2014	1
4	(New Zealand) Scott McLaughlin Racing	2013	1
4	(New Zealand) **Team 4**	2012–2014	1

=== Podiums ===
==== Total podiums ====
	Team	Seasons	Podiums
1	(New Zealand) **M3 Racing**	2012–2014	64
2	(New Zealand) **International Motorsport**	2012–2014	24
3	(Australia) MPC Motorsport	2012–2013	21
4	(New Zealand) **Team 4**	2012–2014	16
5	(New Zealand) **John McIntyre Racing**	2012–2014	11
6	(New Zealand) **AV8 Motorsport**	2012–2014	8
7	(New Zealand) Scott McLaughlin Racing	2013	7
8	(New Zealand) **Tasman Motorsports Group**	2012–2014	6
9	(New Zealand) **PSRacing**	2012–2014	4
10	(New Zealand) **Edgell Performance Racing**	2012–2014	3
11	(New Zealand) **Cunningham Racing**	2012–2014	1

Note: bold text indicates active drivers, teams and manufacturers.
* Figures accurate to Round 4 ITM Auckland 500 2014.

Results 2012-2014 sourced from:

== List of V8SuperTourer Championship Winners – Overall ==
Year	Driver	Car	Team
2012	(New Zealand) Scott McLaughlin	Holden VE Commodore	MPC Motorsport
2013	(New Zealand) Greg Murphy	Holden VE Commodore	M3 Racing
2014	(New Zealand) Greg Murphy	Holden VE Commodore	M3 Racing

== List of V8SuperTourer Championship Winners – Sprint Series ==
Year	Driver	Car	Team
2012	(New Zealand) John McIntyre	Ford FG Falcon	John McIntyre Racing
2013	(New Zealand) Greg Murphy	Holden VE Commodore	M3 Racing
2014	(New Zealand) Greg Murphy	Holden VE Commodore	M3 Racing

== List of V8SuperTourer Championship Winners – Endurance Series ==
Year	Driver	Car	Team
2012	(New Zealand) Scott McLaughlin (Australia) Jonathon Webb	Holden VE Commodore	MPC Motorsport
2013	(New Zealand) Ant Pedersen (Australia) Chaz Mostert	Ford FG Falcon	International Motorsport
2014	Endurance Series not held		
2014-15	(New Zealand) Shane van Gisbergen (New Zealand) Simon Evans	Holden VE Commodore	Team 4
