= Pukekohe 500 =

Motor racing event held in New Zealand

(New Zealand) Pukekohe 500
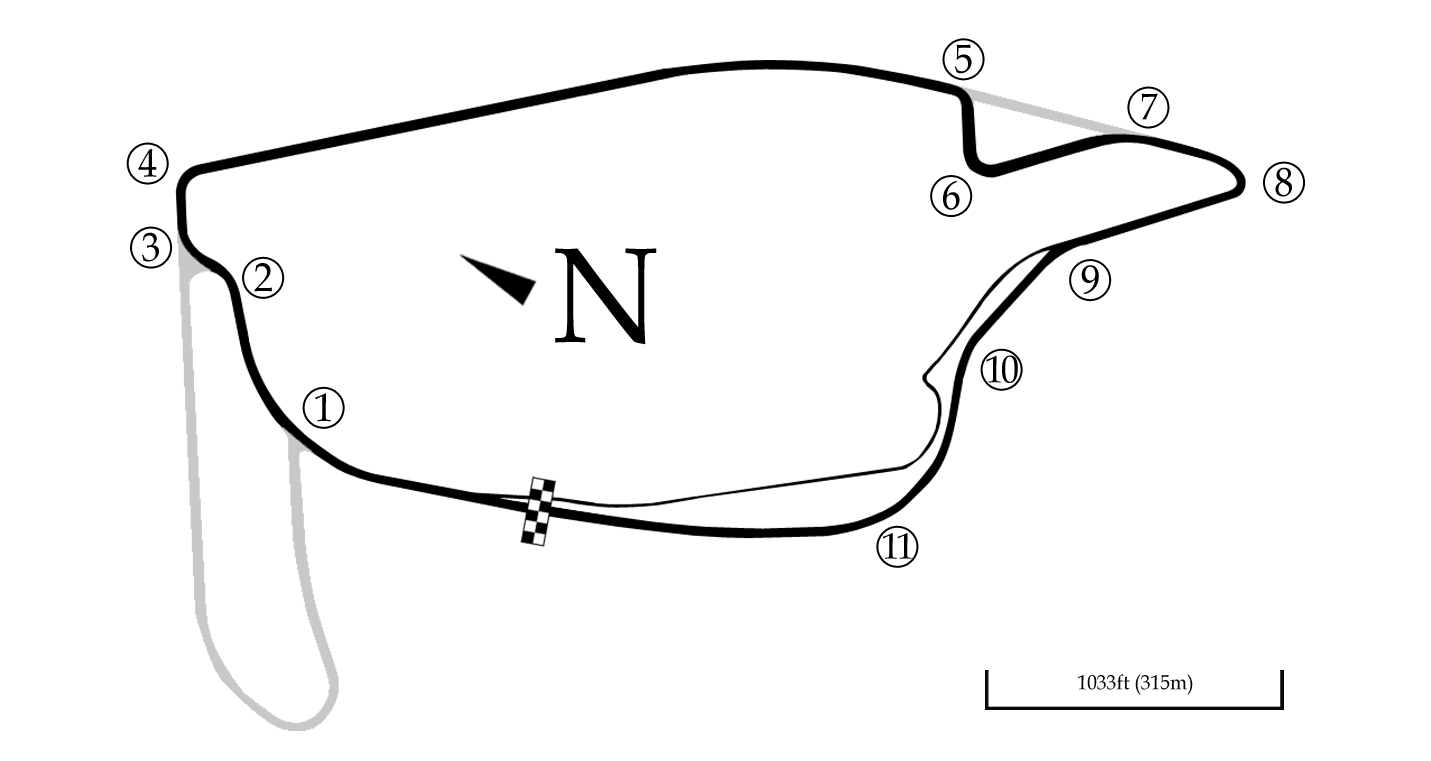
- Race Information
Venue	Pukekohe Park Raceway
Number of times held	39
First held	1963
Last held	2022
- Race Format
- Race 1
Laps	172
Distance	500 km
- Last Event (2022)
- Overall Winner
- RC Racing
- Race Winners

The Pukekohe 500 was an endurance motor racing event first held in 1963 at Pukekohe Park Raceway, Pukekohe, New Zealand.

== History ==
The Pukekohe 500 had its origins in the Wills Six-Hour race that was first held in 1963 as a production car race, soon after the circuit opened. From 1967, the event mandated that New Zealand-built production cars can only be entered into the race. Through the first decades of the race, the event became recognised as the second most significant race on the New Zealand motorsport calendar behind the New Zealand Grand Prix. In the early 1980s, a three race endurance series was held with races also at Bay Park Raceway and Manfeild.

In the mid-1980s, the race rose to international prominence when it adopted Group A touring car regulations and was linked with the Wellington 500 street race. The two races attracted Group A racing teams from Australia, Europe and Asia though until the end of the Group A era in the early 1990s. The 1988 round was part of the Asia-Pacific Touring Car Championship with Wellington, the Bathurst 1000 in Australia and the Fuji 500. The 1993 and 1994 events were held to Super Touring regulations before dropping off the calendar altogether with the demise of the Wellington 500.

From 2001, the predominant touring car event at Pukekohe was superseded by the Auckland SuperSprint, a round of the Australian Supercars Championship series held at the circuit. However, the Pukekohe 500 name was revived in 2012 as a V8SuperTourer endurance event, albeit held over three races. The meeting proved popular with large crowds attending. Greg Murphy rekindled his success from the V8 Supercars era at Pukekohe by winning two of the three races. The V8SuperTourer series folded in 2015 and with it the running of the Pukekohe 500.

The event was revived in 2019 as a production event. In 2020, Mark Leonard and Peter Sprague, descendants of Leo Leonard and Ernie and Gary Sprague who won the race a combined 14 times, entered the race. After the 2021 race was cancelled due to the COVID-19 pandemic, the event was held for a final time in 2022 prior to the circuit's closure in 2023.

== Winners ==
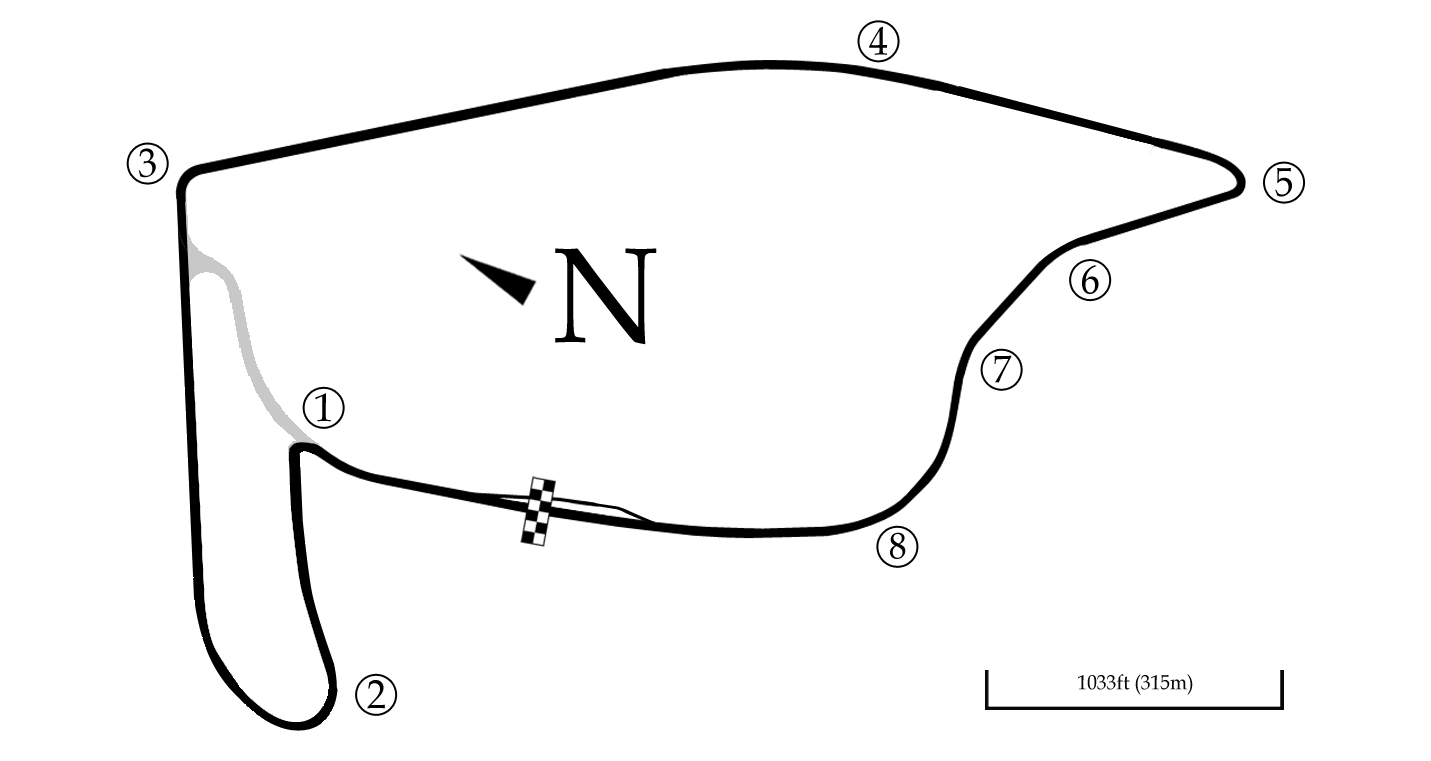
1963–1966 layout

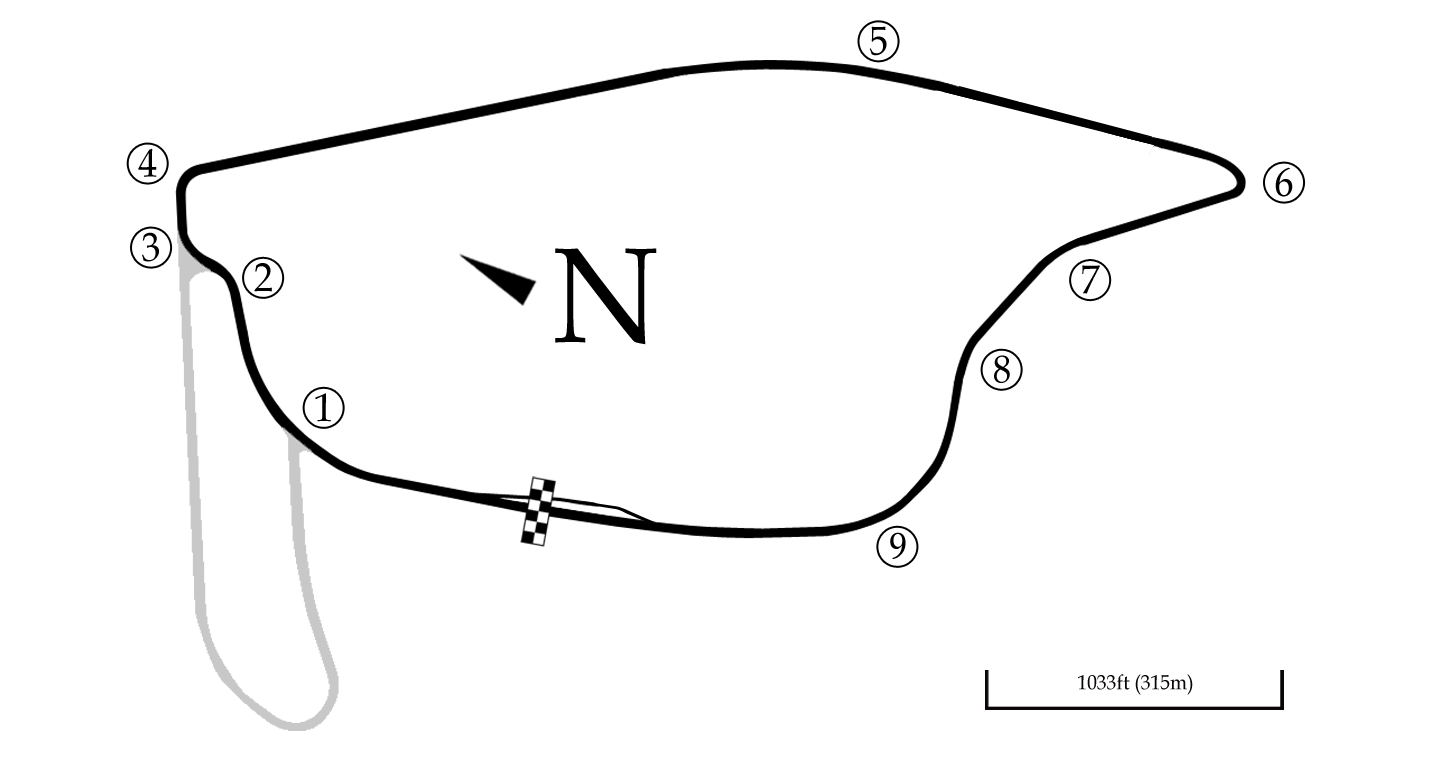
1967–1989 layout

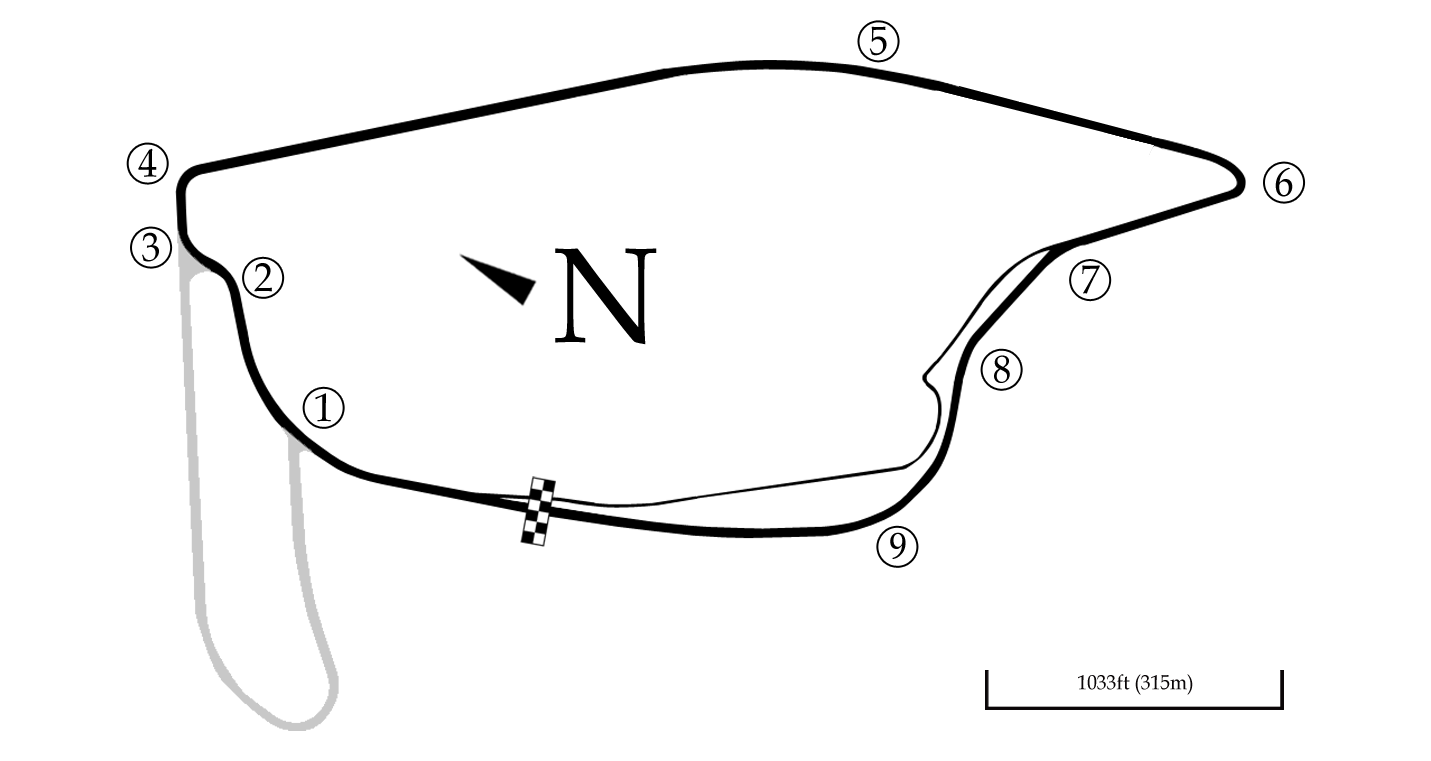
1990–2012 layout

Year	Driver/s	Car	Team	Report
Six hours
1963	(New Zealand) Ray Archibald (New Zealand) Tony Shelly	Jaguar Mark 2		
1964	(New Zealand) Jim Palmer (New Zealand) Paul Fahey	Lotus Cortina		
1965	(New Zealand) John Ward (New Zealand) Rod Coppins	Jaguar Mark 2		
1966	(New Zealand) Ray Archibald (New Zealand) Tony Shelly	Jaguar Mark 2		
1967	(New Zealand) Ernie Sprague (New Zealand) Gary Sprague	Ford Zodiac		
500 miles
1968	(New Zealand) Leo Leonard (New Zealand) Brent Hawes	Vauxhall Victor		
1969	(New Zealand) Leo Leonard (New Zealand) Ernie Sprague	Vauxhall Victor		
1970	(New Zealand) Leo Leonard (New Zealand) Ernie Sprague	Chrysler Valiant		
1971	(New Zealand) Leo Leonard (New Zealand) Graeme Richardt	Chrysler Valiant		
1972	(New Zealand) Jim Richards (New Zealand) Rod Coppins	Chrysler Valiant Charger		
1973	(New Zealand) Jim Richards (New Zealand) Rod Coppins	Chrysler Valiant Charger		
1974	(New Zealand) Wayne Wilkinson (New Zealand) Brian Innes	Chrysler Valiant Charger		
1000 kilometres
1975	(New Zealand) Leo Leonard (New Zealand) Gary Sprague	Chrysler Valiant Charger		
1976	(New Zealand) Jim Little (New Zealand) Graeme Richardt	Chrysler Valiant Charger		
1977	(New Zealand) Leo Leonard (New Zealand) Ernie Sprague	Chrysler Valiant Charger		
1978	(New Zealand) Wayne Wilkinson (New Zealand) Roy Harrington	Chrysler Valiant Charger		
1979	(New Zealand) Rod Coppins (New Zealand) Jerry Clayton	Volkswagen Golf Mk1		
1980	(New Zealand) Rod Coppins (New Zealand) Jerry Clayton	Holden VB Commodore		
250 miles
1981	(New Zealand) Leo Leonard (New Zealand) Gary Sprague	Ford Fairmont		
1982	(New Zealand) Wayne Wilkinson (New Zealand) Neville Crichton	Holden VH Commodore		
1983	(New Zealand) Denny Hulme (New Zealand) Ray Smith	Holden VH Commodore		
1984	(New Zealand) Kent Baigent (New Zealand) Neal Lowe	BMW 635 CSi	H. Kent Baigent	
1985	(New Zealand) Neville Crichton (New Zealand) Wayne Wilkinson	BMW 635 CSi	John Andrew Motorsport	Report
1986	(Australia) John Harvey (New Zealand) Neal Lowe	Holden VK Commodore SS Group A	Holden Dealer Team	
1987^{1}	(Australia) Larry Perkins (New Zealand) Denny Hulme	Holden VK Commodore SS Group A	Perkins Engineering	
1987^{1}	(Italy) Gianfranco Brancatelli (Australia) Allan Grice	BMW M3	Mark Petch Motorsport	
1988	(Australia) Andrew Miedecke (United Kingdom) Steve Soper	Ford Sierra RS500	Miedecke Motorsport	
1989	(Australia) Dick Johnson (Australia) John Bowe	Ford Sierra RS500	Dick Johnson Racing	
1990	(Australia) Peter Brock (Australia) Andrew Miedecke	Ford Sierra RS500	Mobil 1 Racing	
1991	(New Zealand) Jim Richards (Australia) Mark Skaife	Nissan Skyline R32 GT-R	Gibson Motorsport	
1992	(Italy) Emanuele Pirro (Germany) Joachim Winkelhock	BMW M3 Evolution	Schnitzer Motorsport	
1993	(New Zealand) Paul Radisich (Australia) Glenn Seton	Ford Mondeo Si	Rousesport	
1994	(United Kingdom) Julian Bailey	Toyota Corona	Toyota New Zealand	
1995 – 2011	Not held			
2012	(New Zealand) Greg Murphy (Australia) Jack Perkins	Holden VE Commodore	M3 Racing	
2013	(New Zealand) Scott McLaughlin (Australia) James Moffat	Holden VE Commodore	Scott McLaughlin Racing	
2014	(New Zealand) Simon Evans (New Zealand) Shane van Gisbergen	Holden VE Commodore	Team 4	
2015 – 2018	Not held			
500 kilometres
2019	(New Zealand) Alastair Wootten (New Zealand) Greg Goudie	Toyota MR2		
500 miles
2020	(New Zealand) Karl Gaines (New Zealand) Karl Weber (New Zealand) Lance Gerlach	Honda Integra		
2021	Not held			
500 kilometres
2022			RC Racing	

Notes

- ^1 – Two separate events were held in 1987.

== Multiple winners ==
=== By driver ===
Wins	Driver	Years
7	(New Zealand) Leo Leonard	1968, 1969, 1970, 1971, 1975, 1977, 1981
5	(New Zealand) Rod Coppins	1965, 1972, 1973, 1979, 1980
4	(New Zealand) Wayne Wilkinson	1974, 1978, 1982, 1985
4	(New Zealand) Ernie Sprague	1967, 1969, 1970, 1977
3	(New Zealand) Jim Richards	1972, 1973, 1991
3	(New Zealand) Gary Sprague	1967, 1975, 1981
2	(New Zealand) Ray Archibald	1963, 1966
2	(New Zealand) Tony Shelley	1963, 1966
2	(New Zealand) Graeme Richardt	1971, 1976
2	(New Zealand) Jerry Clayton	1979, 1980
2	(Australia) Neal Lowe	1984, 1986
2	(New Zealand) Neville Crichton	1982, 1985
2	(New Zealand) Denny Hulme	1983, 1987
2	(Australia) Andrew Miedecke	1988, 1990

=== By manufacturer ===
Wins	Manufacturer
9	Chrysler
8	Holden
6	Ford
4	BMW
3	Jaguar
2	Vauxhall
2	Toyota

== Event sponsors ==
- 1963–67: Wills
- 1968–84, 1987: Benson & Hedges
- 1988: ProMo
- 1989–93: Nissan-Mobil
- 2012: Woodstock
- 2013: Mike Pero
- 2014: Fuchs

== See also ==
- Wellington 500
- Auckland SuperSprint
