= 2014–15 V8SuperTourer season =

2014–15 V8SuperTourer

Seasons
- ← 2014 none →

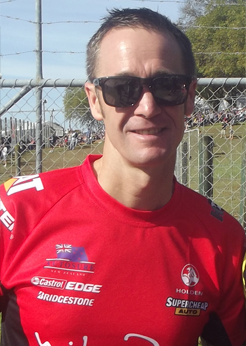
Defending drivers' champion Greg Murphy.

The 2014–15 BNT NZ SuperTourers season was a motor racing championship for touring cars held in New Zealand. The season started on 27 September at Taupo Motorsport Park and ended on 12 April at Pukekohe Park Raceway. All cars used a chassis built by Paul Ceprnich of Pace Innovations in Australia, and were powered by a Chevrolet LS7 7-litre engine.

Previous NZ SuperTourers seasons ran over the calendar year from January to December but in 2014, the season ran from January to April in order to align with other New Zealand championship series – for 2014–15 – that are contested over the Southern Hemisphere summer. Greg Murphy started the season as the defending drivers' champion.

Team 4 Holden driver Simon Evans wrapped up the championship in an abbreviated season which saw two sprint rounds cancelled late in the season. Evans won the Sprint trophy and shared the endurance trophy with team-mate Shane van Gisbergen.

== Calendar ==
The 2014–15 NZ SuperTourers season consisted of seven rounds when announced in April 2014, but two rounds were cancelled in February 2015 as teams pulled out of the series.

Details
Rnd.	Event	Circuit	City / State	Date
1	Taupo 400	Taupo Motorsport Park	Taupō, New Zealand	27–28 September
2	Waikato 400	Hampton Downs Motorsport Park	North Waikato, New Zealand	1–2 November
3	Fuchs 500	Pukekohe Park Raceway	Pukekohe, New Zealand	28–30 November
4	Waikato 250	Hampton Downs Motorsport Park	North Waikato, New Zealand	31 January – 1 February
–	cancelled	Timaru International Motor Raceway	Timaru, New Zealand	7–8 March
–	cancelled	Mike Pero Motorsport Park	Christchurch, New Zealand	21–22 March
5	Pukekohe 250	Pukekohe Park Raceway	Pukekohe, New Zealand	11–12 April

Key:

Race forms part of the NZ SuperTourers Championship.
Race forms part of the NZ SuperTourers Championship and the Endurance Series.

== Teams and drivers ==
Season entries				Endurance entries	
Team	No.	Season driver	Rounds	Endurance driver	Rounds
M3 Racing	1	(New Zealand) Greg Murphy	1–3	(Australia) Jack Perkins	1–3
M3 Racing	10	(New Zealand) Richard Moore	1–3	(Australia) Tim Slade	1–3
M3 Racing	15	(New Zealand) Paul Manuell	1–3, 5	(Australia) Shae Davies	1–3
Angus Fogg Racing	3	(New Zealand) Angus Fogg	1–3	(Australia) Tony D'Alberto	1–3
Angus Fogg Racing	3	(Australia) Tony D'Alberto	4–5	(Australia) Tony D'Alberto	1–3
Team 4	4	(New Zealand) Simon Evans	All	(New Zealand) Shane van Gisbergen	1–3
Team 4	5	(New Zealand) Mitch Evans	4	—N/a	
Edgell Performance Racing	8	(New Zealand) Tim Edgell	1–4	(Australia) Steve Owen	1–3
iSport Racing	9	(New Zealand) Dominic Storey	1, 3–4	(Australia) Dale Wood	1
iSport Racing	9	(New Zealand) Dominic Storey	1, 3–4	(Australia) Nick Percat	3
Varney Motorsport	14	(New Zealand) Shaun Varney	1–4	(Australia) John Penny	1
Varney Motorsport	14	(New Zealand) Shaun Varney	1–4	(New Zealand) Andrew Waite	2–3
Varney Motorsport	14	(New Zealand) Gene Rollinson	5	—N/a	
Andre Heimgartner Racing	22	(New Zealand) Andre Heimgartner	All	(Australia) Paul Morris	1–2
Andre Heimgartner Racing	22	(New Zealand) Andre Heimgartner	All	(Australia) Drew Russell	3
PSR Racing	27	(New Zealand) Chris Hanley	1–3	(New Zealand) Daniel Gaunt	1
PSR Racing	27	(New Zealand) Chris Hanley	1–3	(New Zealand) Gene Rollinson	2–3
Cunningham Racing	32	(New Zealand) Mitch Cunningham	All	(Australia) Cameron Waters	1–3
John McIntyre Racing	47	(New Zealand) Mark Gibson	1–3	(New Zealand) John McIntyre	1–3
International Motorsport	96	(New Zealand) Ant Pedersen	1–2	(New Zealand) Jonny Reid	1–2

== Results ==
Round		Date	Circuit	Pole position	Fastest lap	Winning driver	Winning team	Round winner(s)
1	R1	27 September 2014	Taupo Motorsport Park (Taupō)	(New Zealand) Simon Evans (New Zealand) Shane van Gisbergen	(New Zealand) Shane van Gisbergen	(New Zealand) Simon Evans (New Zealand) Shane van Gisbergen	Team 4	(New Zealand) Simon Evans (New Zealand) Shane van Gisbergen
1	R2	28 September 2014	Taupo Motorsport Park (Taupō)		(New Zealand) Shane van Gisbergen	(New Zealand) Simon Evans (New Zealand) Shane van Gisbergen	Team 4	(New Zealand) Simon Evans (New Zealand) Shane van Gisbergen
1	R3	28 September 2014	Taupo Motorsport Park (Taupō)		(New Zealand) Greg Murphy	(New Zealand) Mitch Cunningham (Australia) Cameron Waters	Cunningham Racing	(New Zealand) Simon Evans (New Zealand) Shane van Gisbergen
2	R1	1 November 2014	Hampton Downs Motorsport Park (North Waikato)	(New Zealand) Simon Evans (New Zealand) Shane van Gisbergen	(New Zealand) Shane van Gisbergen	(New Zealand) Simon Evans (New Zealand) Shane van Gisbergen	Team 4	(New Zealand) Richard Moore (Australia) Tim Slade
2	R2	2 November 2014	Hampton Downs Motorsport Park (North Waikato)		(New Zealand) Shane van Gisbergen	(New Zealand) Richard Moore (Australia) Tim Slade	M3 Racing	(New Zealand) Richard Moore (Australia) Tim Slade
2	R3	2 November 2014	Hampton Downs Motorsport Park (North Waikato)		(New Zealand) Shane van Gisbergen	(New Zealand) Simon Evans (New Zealand) Shane van Gisbergen	Team 4	(New Zealand) Richard Moore (Australia) Tim Slade
3	R1	29 November 2014	Pukekohe Park Raceway (Pukekohe)	(New Zealand) Simon Evans (New Zealand) Shane van Gisbergen	(New Zealand) Shane van Gisbergen	(New Zealand) Simon Evans (New Zealand) Shane van Gisbergen	Team 4	(New Zealand) Tim Edgell (Australia) Steve Owen
3	R2	30 November 2014	Pukekohe Park Raceway (Pukekohe)		(New Zealand) Shane van Gisbergen	(New Zealand) Simon Evans (New Zealand) Shane van Gisbergen	Team 4	(New Zealand) Tim Edgell (Australia) Steve Owen
3	R3	30 November 2014	Pukekohe Park Raceway (Pukekohe)		(New Zealand) Shane van Gisbergen	(New Zealand) Mitch Cunningham (Australia) Cameron Waters	Cunningham Racing	(New Zealand) Tim Edgell (Australia) Steve Owen
4	R1	31 January 2015	Hampton Downs Motorsport Park (North Waikato)	(New Zealand) Simon Evans	(New Zealand) Andre Heimgartner	(New Zealand) Simon Evans	Team 4	(New Zealand) Simon Evans
4	R2	1 February 2015	Hampton Downs Motorsport Park (North Waikato)	(New Zealand) Simon Evans	(New Zealand) Mitch Evans	(New Zealand) Simon Evans	Team 4	(New Zealand) Simon Evans
4	R3	1 February 2015	Hampton Downs Motorsport Park (North Waikato)		(New Zealand) Andre Heimgartner	(New Zealand) Simon Evans	Team 4	(New Zealand) Simon Evans
–		7–8 March 2015	Timaru International Motor Raceway (Timaru)	Meeting cancelled				
–		21–22 March 2015	Mike Pero Motorsport Park (Christchurch)	Meeting cancelled				
5	R1	11 April 2015	Pukekohe Park Raceway (Pukekohe)	(New Zealand) Andre Heimgartner	(New Zealand) Andre Heimgartner	(New Zealand) Andre Heimgartner	Andre Heimgartner Racing	(New Zealand) Simon Evans
5	R2	12 April 2015	Pukekohe Park Raceway (Pukekohe)		(New Zealand) Simon Evans	(Australia) Tony D'Alberto	Angus Fogg Racing	(New Zealand) Simon Evans
5	R3	12 April 2015	Pukekohe Park Raceway (Pukekohe)		(New Zealand) Andre Heimgartner	(New Zealand) Andre Heimgartner	Andre Heimgartner Racing	(New Zealand) Simon Evans

== Championship standings ==
=== Drivers' championship ===
Pos.	Driver	No.	TAU			HMP			PUK			HMP			PUK			Pen.	Pts.
1	(New Zealand) Simon Evans	4	**1**	1	3	**1**	8	1	**1**	1	3	**1**	**1**	1	2	2	2	80	1609
2	(New Zealand) Andre Heimgartner	22	3	3	7	3	3	7	7	5	7	2	Ret	3	**1**	Ret	1	30	1340
3	(Australia) Tony D'Alberto	3	7	7	9	10	7	8	5	2	Ret	3	Ret	5	3	1	3	0	1155
4	(New Zealand) Shane van Gisbergen	4	**1**	1	3	**1**	8	1	**1**	1	3							80	1102
5	(New Zealand) Paul Manuell	15	6	8	8	6	5	6	9	8	6				6	3	5	0	1019
6	(Australia) Tim Slade	10	2	6	5	5	1	2	3	11	8							0	973
7	(New Zealand) Tim Edgell	8	DNS	9	10	9	9	4	2	6	2	7	3	6				0	962
8	(New Zealand) Richard Moore	10	2	6	5	5	1	2	3	11	8							0	951
9	(Australia) Jack Perkins	1	Ret	2	6	2	2	3	6	3	4							0	944
10	(New Zealand) Mitch Cunningham	32	8	10	1	8	10	10	Ret	Ret	1	5	4	Ret	5	5	6	60	938
11	(New Zealand) Greg Murphy	1	Ret	2	6	2	2	3	6	3	4							0	934
12	(New Zealand) John McIntyre	47	4	5	4	7	4	5	8	7	10							0	882
13	(New Zealand) Mark Gibson	47	4	5	4	7	4	5	8	7	10							0	874
14	(Australia) Shae Davies	15	6	8	8	6	5	6	9	8	6							0	836
15	(Australia) Steve Owen	8	DNS	9	10	9	9	4	2	6	2							0	834
16	(New Zealand) Angus Fogg	3	7	7	9	10	7	8	5	2	Ret							0	737
17	(Australia) Cameron Waters	32	8	10	1	8	10	10	Ret	Ret	1							0	707
18	(Australia) Paul Morris	22	3	3	7	3	3	7										0	634
19	(New Zealand) Shaun Varney	14	11	Ret	13	12	Ret	12	DNS	9	9	8	5	7				0	622
20	(New Zealand) Jonny Reid	96	5	4	2	4	6	9										0	615
21	(New Zealand) Dominic Storey	9	10	Ret	12				4	4	5	6	Ret	4				0	612
22	(New Zealand) Ant Pedersen	96	5	4	2	4	6	9										0	598
23	(New Zealand) Chris Hanley	27	9	11	11	11	11	11	10	10	Ret							20	594
24	(New Zealand) Gene Rollinson	27; 14				11	11	11	10	10	Ret				4	4	4	20	553
25	(New Zealand) Andrew Waite	14				12	Ret	12	DNS	9	9							10	315
26	(Australia) Nick Percat	9							4	4	5							0	314
27	(Australia) Drew Russell	22							7	5	7							0	284
28	(New Zealand) Mitch Evans	5										4	2	2				0	245
29	(New Zealand) Daniel Gaunt	27	9	11	11													0	237
30	(Australia) Dale Wood	9	10	Ret	12													0	141
31	(New Zealand) John Penny	14	11	Ret	13													0	134
Pos.	Driver	No.	TAU			HMP			PUK			HMP			PUK			Pen.	Pts.

Colour	Result
Gold	Winner
Silver	Second place
Bronze	Third place
Green	Points classification
Blue	Non-points classification
Blue	Non-classified finish (NC)
Purple	Retired, not classified (Ret)
Red	Did not qualify (DNQ)
Red	Did not pre-qualify (DNPQ)
Black	Disqualified (DSQ)
White	Did not start (DNS)
White	Withdrew (WD)
White	Race cancelled (C)
Blank	Did not practice (DNP)
Blank	Did not arrive (DNA)
Blank	Excluded (EX)

**Bold** - Pole position
Italics - Fastest lap
