= V8SuperTourer =

Motor racing series in New Zealand

- Category: Touring car racing Silhouette racing car
- Country: New Zealand
- Inaugural season: 2012
- Folded: 2015
- Constructors: Holden; Ford
- Engine suppliers: Chevrolet 7.0 V8
- Tyre suppliers: Hankook
- Last Drivers' champion: Simon Evans

The V8SuperTourers Championship was a motor racing series in New Zealand which started in 2012 and folded in 2015. The cars were then absorbed into the NZ Touring Cars championship.

The car was based on a "Car-of-the-Future" prototype built by Paul Ceprnich of Pace Innovations Australia similar to that of the Australian V8 Supercar series. It was designed to be customised to many different manufacturers vehicles including a Holden VE Commodore, Ford FG Falcon, Toyota Camry or BMW 5 Series. Testing started in April 2010.

The V8SuperTourer Championship was run by V8SuperTourers Limited, a company formed by current NZV8 team owners Mark Petch, Wayne Anderson and Garry Pedersen.

The aim of the company was to build a new V8 touring car, similar to a current Australian V8 Supercar but at less than half the cost. The V8SuperTourer was designed to have performance similar to that of a current Australian V8 Supercar and was designed for both sprint and long distance racing, including a 120-litre capacity fuel cell.

== The V8SuperTourer car ==
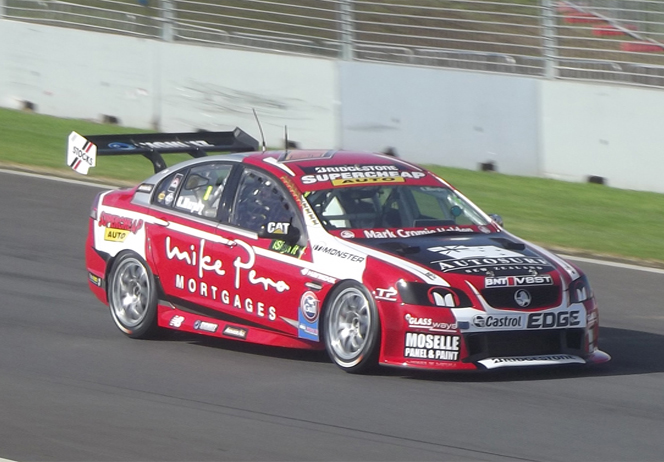
#1 Greg Murphy

Designed and built by Paul Ceprnich of Pace Innovations Australia, the V8SuperTourer prototype uses a Holden VE Commodore body mounted on a purpose-built chassis. The chassis, like the Australian V8 Supercar car of the future (or COTF) project, is built to not only accommodate both the current VE Commodore and Ford FG Falcon bodies, but any other similar sized four-dour production vehicle such a Toyota Camry or BMW 5 Series. Interested vehicle manufacturers of four-door saloon cars of a similar size to the Holden Commodore VE and Ford FG Falcon models can apply to race in the series.

The V8SuperTourer uses a strictly-controlled, one make, all-alloy, fuel injected and dry sumped 7-litre V8 ST engine. The power-plant is derived from the Le Mans Corvette C6.R programme and is hand-built in the United States. It delivers 550 horsepower at 6,800 revs per minute and is expected to have a racing life of 10,000 kilometres before requiring maintenance. This engine is identical to that of the Mosler Automotives current and very successful GT3 sports-car.

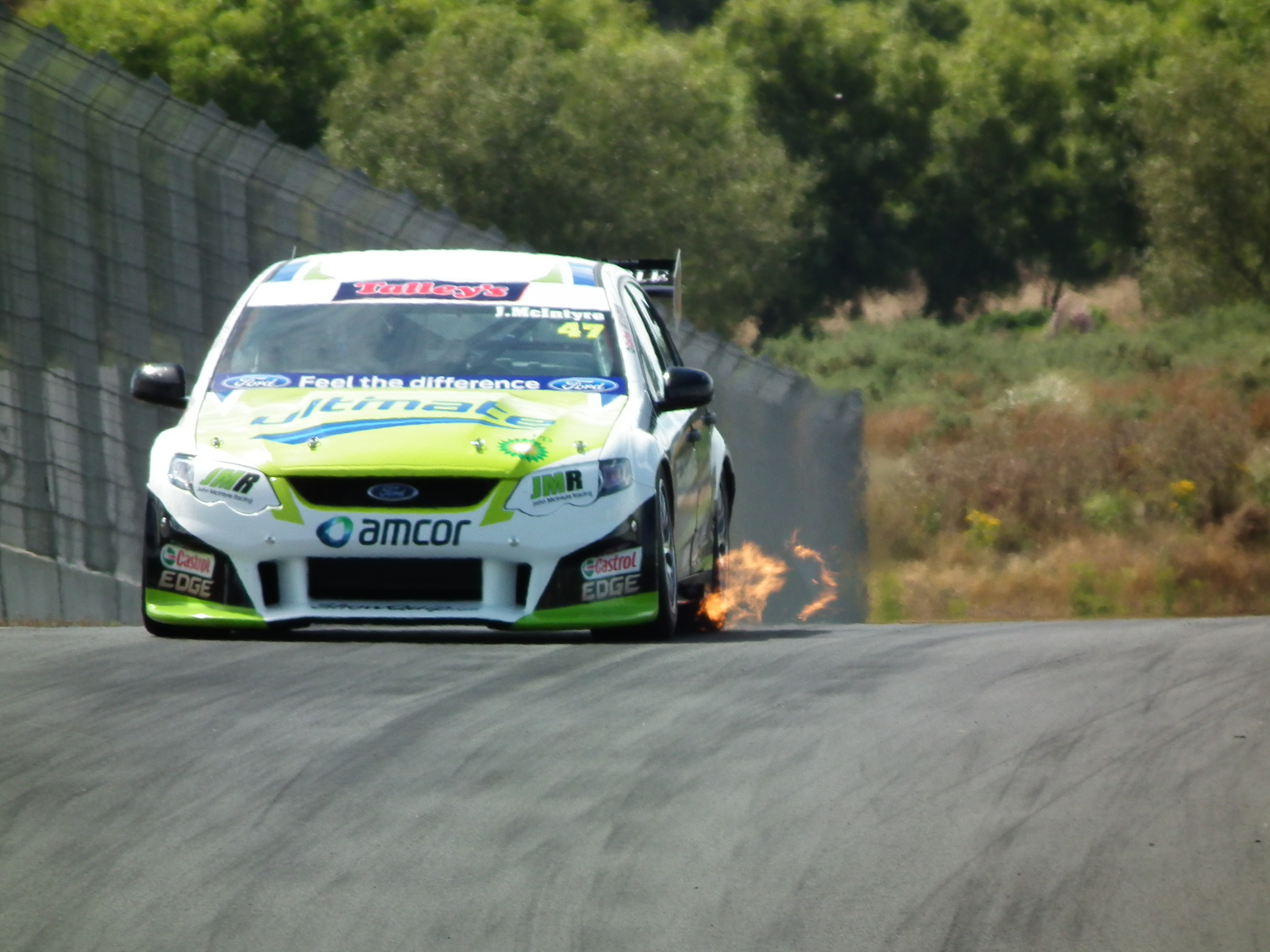
#47 John McIntyre

The Link Engine Management, G4 Xtreme manages the fuel, ignition and e-throttle, gear shift cuts, performance limiting when parameters go "out of range" as well as supplying data to the Race Technology dash.

The drive-train consists of a triple-plate clutch, which delivers engine torque through a Quaife 6-speed sequential transmission via a one-piece pro-shaft feeding a classic 9 Ford differential, which is fitted with a locked differential, crown wheel carrier assembly in order to provide excellent traction in most conditions.

The rear suspension adopts the proven, yet simple in design and maintenance, three-link live rear axle fitted with camber and toe, CV style, floating rear hubs.

The front suspension is a sophisticated clean sheet, double wishbone layout that is also symmetrical from left to right, thus reducing spares inventories, etc. Both the front and rear suspension oscillations are dampened by adjustable bump and rebound shock absorbers fitted with adjustable spring platforms.

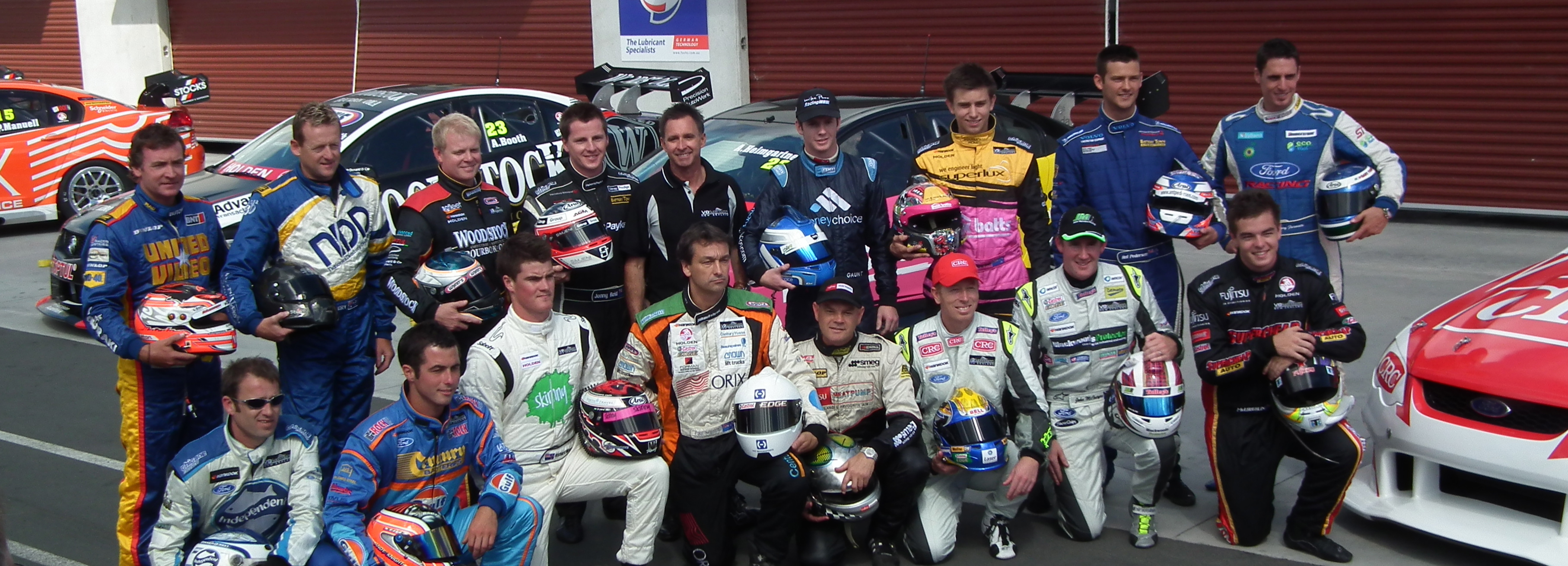
Drivers with CEO Paul Radisich

The rack and pinion power steering assembly is mounted ahead of the engine in order to better optimise the front suspension geometry and the high loads generated under long distance racing events.

The V8SuperTourer uses 10x18 forged alloy wheels carrying 280 x 680 x 18 racing slicks or wet weather radial tyres.

The Brembo brake package, use ventilated 380mm diameter 35mm thick rotors in the front, and 355x32 mm ventilated rotors in the rear. Both the front and rear rotors are fitted with Brembo's super-stiff "forged" billet alloy 6 piston brake callipers, in the front and 4 piston callipers in the rear. This state of the art brake package combines to stop the comparatively light car, which has an all up weight, including driver, of less than 1,300 kg, faster than a current supercar.

== Champions ==
Season	Overall Champion	Team Champion	Sprint Series Champion	Endurance Series Champion
2012	(New Zealand) Scott McLaughlin	MPC Motorsport	(New Zealand) John McIntyre	(New Zealand) Scott McLaughlin (Australia) Jonathon Webb
2013	(New Zealand) Greg Murphy	M3 Racing	(New Zealand) Greg Murphy	(New Zealand) Ant Pedersen (Australia) Chaz Mostert
2014	(New Zealand) Greg Murphy	M3 Racing	(New Zealand) Greg Murphy	Endurance Series not held
2014-15	(New Zealand) Simon Evans	Team 4	(New Zealand) Simon Evans	(New Zealand) Simon Evans (New Zealand) Shane Van Gisbergen

== Records ==
Greg Murphy who holds the record for most Race and Round Wins.

- First pole sitter ever: Kayne Scott in 2012 Round 1 at Hampton Downs
- First race winner: Greg Murphy in 2012 Round 1 at Hampton Downs
- First round winner: Greg Murphy in 2012 Round 1 at Hampton Downs
- Most race wins in a row: Greg Murphy in 2014 Race 1 Round 1 Highlands to Race 1 Round 3 Pukekohe (7 Race Wins)
- Most podium finishes in a row: Greg Murphy from 2013 Round 7 Race 3 Pukekohe 500 to 2014 Race 3 Round 4 Pukekohe (14 Podiums)

=== Race wins by driver ===
Wins	Drivers	Manufacturers
22	Greg Murphy	Holden
7	Scott McLaughlin	Holden
6	Ant Pedersen	Ford
5	Jack Perkins	Holden
4	Shane Van Gisbergen	Ford
3	Jonathon Webb	Holden
3	Daniel Gaunt	Ford
2	Jonny Reid	Ford
2	Fabian Coulthard	Holden
2	Tim Edgell	Holden
2	Lee Holdsworth	Holden
2	Chaz Mostert	Ford
2	Richard Moore	Holden
1	John McIntyre	Ford
1	Nick Cassidy	Holden
1	Andrew Waite	Ford
1	Andy Booth	Holden
1	Alex Davison	Ford
1	Tim Slade	Holden
1	James Moffat	Holden

Accurate to and including, 2014

=== Round wins by driver ===
Wins	Drivers	Manufacturers
7	Greg Murphy	Holden
4	Scott McLaughlin	Holden
3	Shane Van Gisbergen	Ford
2	Jonathon Webb	Holden
1	Jonny Reid	Ford
1	Fabian Coulthard	Holden
1	Jack Perkins	Holden
1	Daniel Gaunt	Ford
1	Alex Davison	Ford
1	James Moffat	Holden
1	Ant Pedersen	Ford
1	Chaz Mostert	Ford

Accurate to and including, 2014

=== Podium finishes by driver ===
Podiums	Drivers	Manufacturers
36	Greg Murphy	Holden
17	Scott McLaughlin	Holden
17	Ant Pedersen	Ford
16	Richard Moore	Holden
11	Jack Perkins	Holden
10	John McIntyre	Ford
9	Simon Evans	Holden
8	Shane Van Gisbergen	Ford
8	Jonathon Webb	Holden
7	Andy Booth	Holden
6	Jonny Reid	Ford
6	Daniel Gaunt	Ford
6	Chaz Mostert	Ford
6	Tim Slade	Holden
6	Andre Heimgartner	Holden
3	Fabian Coulthard	Holden
3	Kayne Scott	Holden
3	Craig Baird	Ford
3	Tim Edgell	Holden
2	Jono Lester	Ford
2	Nick Cassidy	Holden
2	Andrew Waite	Ford
2	Alex Davison	Ford
2	Lee Holdsworth	Holden
2	James Moffat	Holden
1	Andy Knight	Ford
1	Chris Pither	Ford
1	Owen Kelly	Holden
1	George Miedecke	Ford
1	Tony D'Alberto	Holden
1	Geoff Emery	Holden
1	Steve Owen	Holden
1	Chris van der Drift	Holden
1	Ashley Walsh	Holden
1	Mark Gibson	Ford
1	Morgan Haber	Holden
1	Angus Fogg	Holden
1	Steve Owen	Holden

Accurate to and including, 2014

=== Pole positions by driver ===
Poles	Drivers	Manufacturers
8	Scott McLaughlin	Holden
6	Ant Pedersen	Ford
4	Greg Murphy	Holden
1	Jonny Reid	Ford
1	Fabian Coulthard	Holden
1	Kayne Scott	Holden
1	Chris van der Drift	Holden
1	Shane Van Gisbergen	Ford
1	Richard Moore	Holden
1	Tim Edgell	Holden

Accurate to and including, 2014

== Television coverage ==
Broadcasting rights for the inaugural V8SuperTourer season in 2012 are held by TV3. TV3 will bring free-to-air, same-day, coverage of all seven rounds in 2012 with the third race from each of the sprint rounds and the main race from each of the endurance rounds screening live.
