= Dominic Storey =

New Zealand racing driver

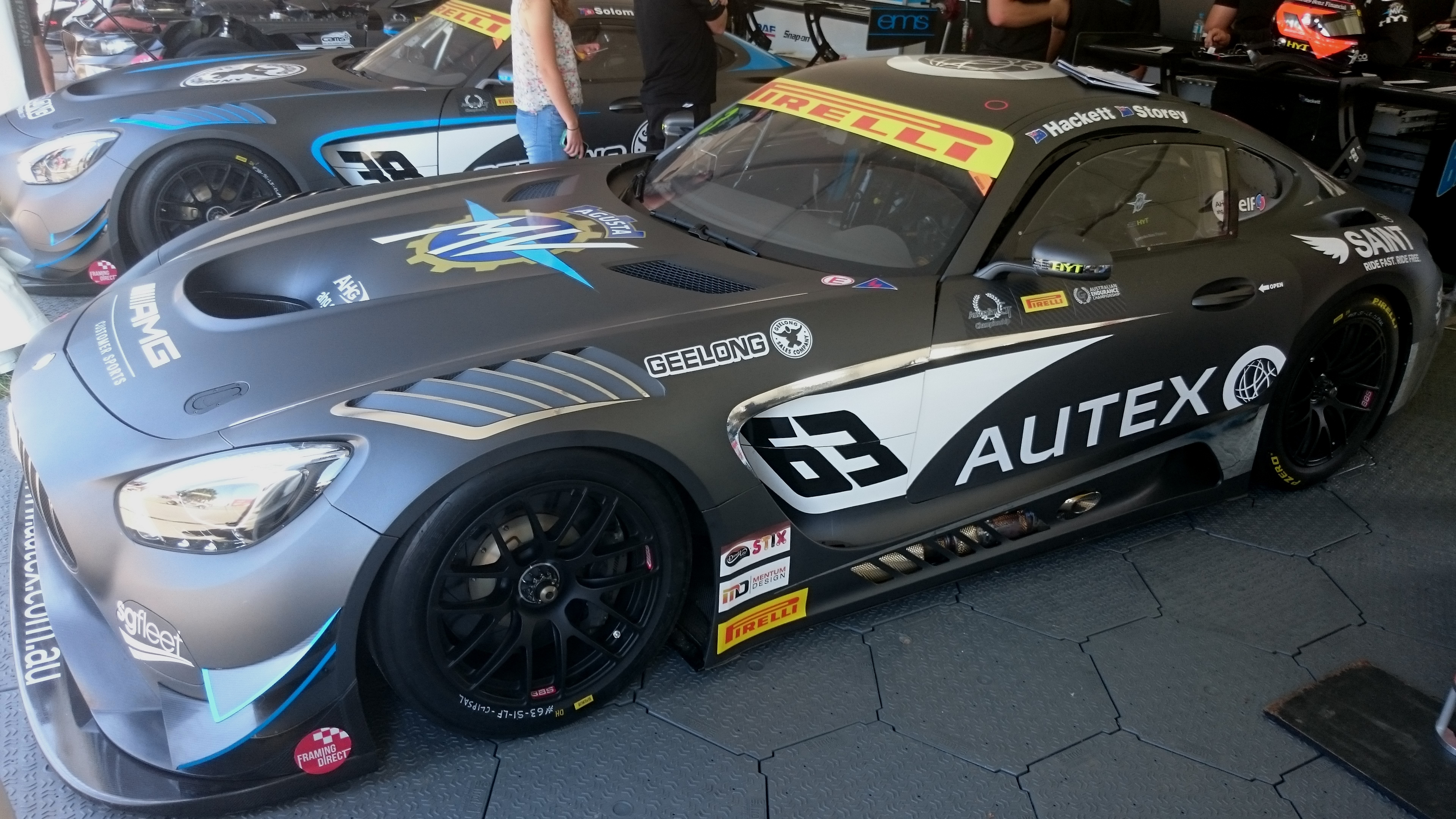
- A Mercedes-AMG GT3 driven by Dominic Storey
- Nationality: (New Zealand) New Zealander
- Born: 15 October 1989 (age 37)

Super2 Series career
- Debut season: 2018
- Current team: Eggleston Motorsport
- Car number: 63
- Starts: 16
- Wins: 0
- Poles: 0
- Fastest laps: 0

Previous series
- 2011 2009 2009 2008–09 2006–08 2007 2006: Formula Renault 3.5 Series; Eurocup Formula Renault 2.0; British Formula 3 Formula Renault 2.0 WEC; Toyota Racing Series; Formula BMW UK; Formula BMW Asia

Dominic Storey (born 15 October 1989) is a racing driver from New Zealand.

== Career ==
=== Formula BMW ===
After a karting career in his native New Zealand, Storey made his single–seater debut in 2006 in Formula BMW Asia, finishing the season fourth overall whilst teammate to current Formula 1 star Daniel Ricciardo. He also contested two races in the British series, having competed for Räikkönen Robertson Racing in Oulton Park where he placed 5th on debut.

=== Toyota Racing Series ===
After three races in 2007, Storey took part on a full-time basis in Toyota Racing Series in 2007–08 with Victory Motor Racing. He took podium–finishes to be classified in fifth place with 792 points and a lap record at the Taupo Motorsport Park.

=== Formula Renault and Formula Three ===
In 2008, Storey made his debut in Formula Renault category with participation in the Formula Renault 2.0 West European Cup series at Estoril. He remained in series for 2009 and joined Eurocup Formula Renault 2.0, but spent only two rounds in both series. He also appeared as a guest driver at Donington Park in British Formula 3.

=== Australian GT Championship ===
Storey raced in the 2016 CAMS Australian GT Endurance Championship in the new AMG GT3 partnering Peter Hackett. The duo finished runner-up in the Championship with three lap records and a podium finish in the Phillip Island 101.

== Racing record ==
=== Karting career summary ===
Season	Series	Position
2000	Super One Series - Comer Cadet	26th
2003	36th Blosson Sprint - Junior 100cc Yamaha GP	10th
2005	RMC New Zealand - Junior Max	**2nd**
2005	Kartsport Mt Wellington - Pop Volkner Memorial Feature	11th
2011	Kartsport Mt Wellington - Pop Volkner Memorial Feature	8th
2013	Kartsport Mt Wellington - Pop Volkner Memorial Feature	7th

=== Circuit career summary ===
Season	Series	Team	Races	Wins	Poles	F/Laps	Podiums	Points	Position
2006	Formula BMW Asia	Eurasia Motorsport	19	0	0	0	6	142	4th
2006–07	Toyota Racing Series	Auto Motion	2	0	0	0	0	52	21st
2007	Formula BMW UK	Räikkönen Robertson Racing	2	0	0	0	0	52	21st
2007–08	Toyota Racing Series	Ken Smith Motorsport	21	0	1	1	1	792	5th
2008	Formula Renault 2.0 WEC	Boutsen Energy Racing	2	0	0	0	0	0	NC†
2009	Eurocup Formula Renault 2.0	SG Formula	4	0	0	0	0	2	20th
2009	Formula Renault 2.0 WEC	SG Formula	4	0	0	0	0	8	14th
2009	British Formula 3 International Series	Räikkönen Robertson Racing	2	0	0	0	0	0	NC†
2011	Formula Renault 3.5 Series	Pons Racing	2	0	0	0	0	0	35th
2011	GP3 Series	Addax Team	4	0	0	0	0	0	37th
2012	V8 SuperTourers	John McIntyre Racing	2	0	0	0	0	0	44th
2013	V8 SuperTourers	iSport Racing	21	0	0	0	0	1019	22nd
2014	V8 SuperTourers	iSport Racing	10	0	0	0	0	408	11th
2014-15	V8 SuperTourers	iSport Racing	9	0	0	0	0	612	21st
2016	Australian GT Championship	Eggleston Motorsport	5	0	0	0	0	49	37th
2016	Australian Endurance Championship	Erebus Motorsport	4	0	0	0	1	434	**2nd**
2017	Australian Endurance Championship	Eggleston Motorsport	4	1	1	0	2	660	**1st**
2017	Intercontinental GT Challenge	Hog's	1	0	0	0	0	0	NC
2018	Australian GT Championship	Eggleston Motorsport	4	1	1	0	1	345	19th
2018	Super2 Series	Eggleston Motorsport	15	0	0	0	0	788	15th
2019	Australian GT Championship	Eggleston Motorsport	2	0	0	0	1	399	9th

† – As Storey was a guest driver, he was ineligible for championship points.

=== Complete Eurocup Formula Renault 2.0 results ===
(key) (Races in bold indicate pole position; races in italics indicate fastest lap)

Year	Entrant	1	2	3	4	5	6	7	8	9	10	11	12	13	14	DC	Points
2009	SG Formula	CAT; 1; 23	CAT; 2; 9	SPA; 1; 22	SPA; 2; 16	HUN; 1	HUN; 2	SIL; 1	SIL; 2	LMS; 1	LMS; 2	NÜR; 1	NÜR; 2	ALC; 1	ALC; 2	26th	2

=== Complete GP3 Series results ===
(key) (Races in bold indicate pole position) (Races in italics indicate fastest lap)

Year	Entrant	1	2	3	4	5	6	7	8	9	10	11	12	13	14	15	16	DC	Points
2011	Addax Team	IST; FEA; 20	IST; SPR; Ret	CAT; FEA; Ret	CAT; SPR; 27†	VAL; FEA	VAL; SPR	SIL; FEA	SIL; SPR	NÜR; FEA	NÜR; SPR	HUN; FEA	HUN; SPR	SPA; FEA	SPA; SPR	MNZ; FEA	MNZ; SPR	37th	0

=== Complete Bathurst 12 Hour results ===
Year	Car#	Team	Co-drivers	Car	Class	Laps	Pos.	Class pos.
2017	61	(Australia) Erebus Motorsport	(Australia) Mark Griffith (Australia) David Reynolds	Mercedes-AMG GT3	APA	157	DNF	DNF
2020	59	(Australia) 59Racing	(Croatia) Martin Kodrić (Australia) Fraser Ross	McLaren 720S GT3	S	313	8th	**1st**

=== Super2 Series results ===
(key) (Round results only)

Super2 Series results
Year	Team	Car	1	2	3	4	5	6	7	Position	Points
2018	Eggleston Motorsport	Holden VF Commodore	ADE; 9	SYM; 19	BAR; 19	TOW; 18	SAN; 13	BAT; 9	NEW; 16	15th	788

Sporting positions
Preceded by Grant Denyer; Nathan Morcom	Winner of the Australian Endurance Championship; 2017 with Peter Hackett	Succeeded by Max Twigg; Tony D'Alberto
