= 2014 V8SuperTourer season =

2014 V8SuperTourer

Seasons
- ← 2013 2014–15 →

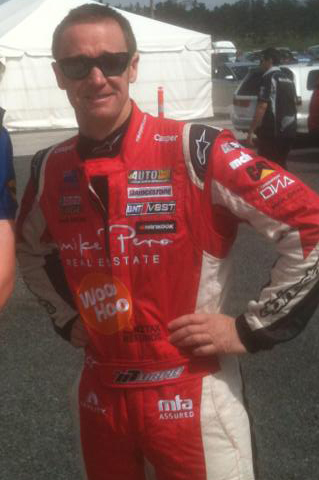
Defending drivers' champion Greg Murphy retained his championship title, finishing over 300 points clear of his nearest rival.

The 2014 V8SuperTourer season was a motor racing championship for touring cars held in New Zealand over four events between January and April 2014. All cars used a chassis built by Paul Ceprnich of Pace Innovations in Australia, and were powered by a Chevrolet LS7 7-litre engine.

The championship consisted of only four rounds, having been reduced from the originally planned seven, as a result of a calendar realignment which will see the series run from September to April from the 2014–15 season onward. The 'sprint' component of the series was kept intact, with the 'endurance' component, which was scheduled to include events at Taupo, Pukekohe and an unconfirmed venue in the South Island, being removed from the 2014 championship and becoming the opening half of the 2014–15 championship. The opening round of the championship saw the series visit Highlands Motorsport Park for the first time.

Greg Murphy entered the season as the defending drivers' champion and claimed victory again, winning 11 of the 13 races in the championship, and scoring 1155 points. Simon Evans claimed second place with 836 points and Richard Moore achieved third place overall with 821 points.

== Calendar ==
The 2014 V8SuperTourer season consisted of four rounds.

Details
Rnd.	Event	Circuit	City / State	Date
1	Fuchs Highlands 250	Highlands Motorsport Park	Cromwell, New Zealand	25–26 January
2	Manfeild 350	Manfeild Autocourse	Feilding, New Zealand	8–9 February
3	Pukekohe 250	Pukekohe Park Raceway	Pukekohe, New Zealand	22–23 March
4	ITM 500 Auckland	Pukekohe Park Raceway	Pukekohe, New Zealand	25–27 April

== Teams and drivers ==
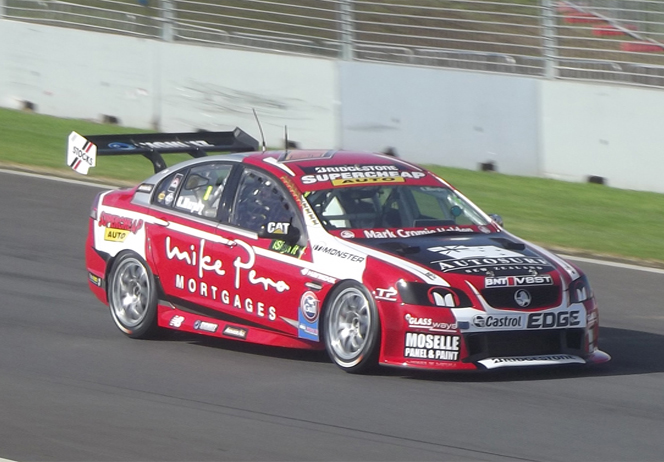
Greg Murphy's championship-winning Mike Pero Commodore.

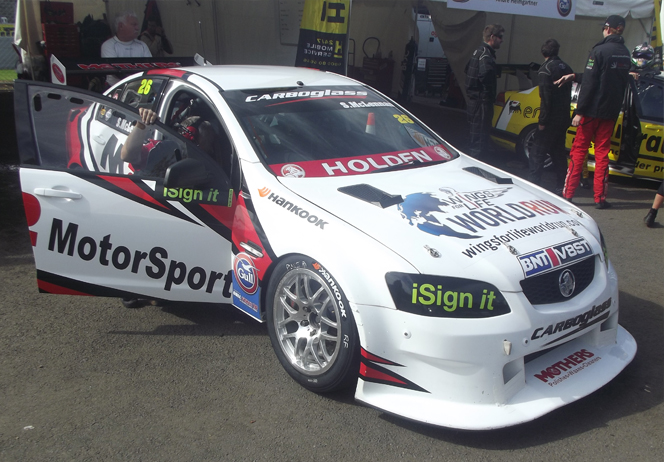
Simon McLennan finished 10th in the 2014 season.

Season entries
Team	Vehicle	No.	Driver	Rounds
M3 Racing	Holden Commodore (VE)	1	(New Zealand) Greg Murphy	All
M3 Racing	Holden Commodore (VE)	10	(New Zealand) Richard Moore	All
M3 Racing	Holden Commodore (VE)	15	(Australia) Morgan Haber	All
Angus Fogg Racing	Holden Commodore (VE)	3	(New Zealand) Angus Fogg	1, 3–4
Team 4	Holden Commodore (VE)	4	(New Zealand) Simon Evans	All
AV8 Motorsport	Holden Commodore (VE)	7	(Australia) Steve Owen	4
Edgell Performance Racing	Holden Commodore (VE)	8	(New Zealand) Tim Edgell	All
iSport Racing	Ford Falcon (FG)	9	(New Zealand) Dominic Storey	2–4
MPC Motorsport	Holden Commodore (VE)	22	(New Zealand) Andre Heimgartner	All
M2 Motorsport	Holden Commodore (VE)	26	(New Zealand) Simon McLennan	All
PSR Racing	Ford Falcon (FG)	27	(New Zealand) Chris Hanley	All
Tasman Motorsports Group	Ford Falcon (FG)	31	(New Zealand) Andrew Waite	3–4
Cunningham Racing	Ford Falcon (FG)	32	(New Zealand) Mitch Cunningham	All
John McIntyre Racing	Ford Falcon (FG)	47	(New Zealand) Mark Gibson	All
Eddie Bell Racing	Ford Falcon (FG)	69	(New Zealand) Eddie Bell	1–2
International Motorsport	Ford Falcon (FG)	96	(New Zealand) Ant Pedersen	All

== Event summaries ==
=== Fuchs Highlands 250 ===
Results
Event 1	Race 1	Race 2	Race 3
Pole position	(New Zealand) Greg Murphy (M3 Racing)	(New Zealand) Greg Murphy (M3 Racing)	
Race winner	(New Zealand) Greg Murphy (M3 Racing)	(New Zealand) Greg Murphy (M3 Racing)	(New Zealand) Greg Murphy (M3 Racing)

Greg Murphy dominated the opening round of the 2014 V8SuperTourer season collecting both pole positions, all three race wins and two of the three fastest laps available. One thing which was highlighted in the opening round was the lack of cars on the grid with a record low twelve cars; only ten started the final two races of the weekend. It was also the first ever SuperTourer round held at Highlands Motorsport Park, with the series running as a support category to the Toyota Racing Series. A few young drivers starred over the weekend with teenager Andre Heimgartner finishing second overall, while rookies Mark Gibson and Morgan Haber both showed great speed with Gibson eventually finishing 3rd in the final race.

=== The Sound Manfeild 250 ===
Results
Event 2	Race 1	Race 2	Race 3
Pole position	(New Zealand) Ant Pedersen (International Motorsport)	(New Zealand) Ant Pedersen (International Motorsport)	
Race winner	(New Zealand) Greg Murphy (M3 Racing)	(New Zealand) Greg Murphy (M3 Racing)	(New Zealand) Greg Murphy (M3 Racing)

Round 2 of the series was held at Manfeild Autocourse where the SuperTourers were once again running support to the Toyota Racing Series for the New Zealand Grand Prix. Greg Murphy once again took all three races for the weekend with young Simon Evans starring over the weekend keeping Murphy on his heels the whole way. Ant Pedersen returned to his 2013 pace after a disappointing round 1 but it was short lived. After claiming pole position for the opening two races, Pedersen spun at the first corner of the opening race, ruining any chance of winning. Andre Heimgartner again was very consistent leaving the meeting in second place in the championship standings, behind Murphy.

Championship leader table
Round	Championship leader	Lead
Fuchs Highlands 250	(New Zealand) Greg Murphy	63
The Sound Manfeild 250	(New Zealand) Greg Murphy	128
TR Group Pukekohe 250	(New Zealand) Greg Murphy	170
ITM Auckland 500	(New Zealand) Greg Murphy	319

== Results ==
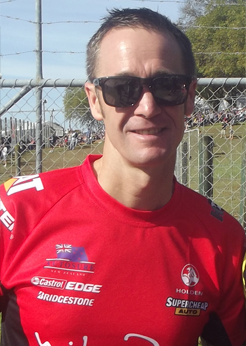
Greg Murphy won eleven of the season's thirteen races, taking podium finishes in every race.

The season starts in the South Island at the new Highlands Motorsport Park Track and finishes at Pukekohe Park Raceway supporting the Auckland 400 for V8 Supercars. The season was supposed to run over seven rounds but was reduced to four, after a calendar realignment which will have the next season run from September 2014 to April 2015.

Round		Date	Circuit	Pole position	Fastest lap	Winning driver	Winning team	Round winner(s)
1	R1	25 January	Highlands Motorsport Park, Cromwell	(New Zealand) Greg Murphy	(New Zealand) Greg Murphy	(New Zealand) Greg Murphy	M3 Racing	(New Zealand) Greg Murphy
1	R2	26 January	Highlands Motorsport Park, Cromwell	(New Zealand) Greg Murphy	(New Zealand) Greg Murphy	(New Zealand) Greg Murphy	M3 Racing	(New Zealand) Greg Murphy
1	R3	26 January	Highlands Motorsport Park, Cromwell		(New Zealand) Ant Pedersen	(New Zealand) Greg Murphy	M3 Racing	(New Zealand) Greg Murphy
2	R1	9 February	Manfeild Autocourse, Feilding	(New Zealand) Ant Pedersen	(New Zealand) Simon Evans	(New Zealand) Greg Murphy	M3 Racing	(New Zealand) Greg Murphy
2	R2	9 February	Manfeild Autocourse, Feilding	(New Zealand) Ant Pedersen	(New Zealand) Simon Evans	(New Zealand) Greg Murphy	M3 Racing	(New Zealand) Greg Murphy
2	R3	9 February	Manfeild Autocourse, Feilding		(New Zealand) Simon Evans	(New Zealand) Greg Murphy	M3 Racing	(New Zealand) Greg Murphy
3	R1	23 March	Pukekohe Park Raceway, Pukekohe	(New Zealand) Ant Pedersen	(New Zealand) Greg Murphy	(New Zealand) Greg Murphy	M3 Racing	(New Zealand) Greg Murphy
3	R2	23 March	Pukekohe Park Raceway, Pukekohe	(New Zealand) Ant Pedersen	(New Zealand) Angus Fogg	(New Zealand) Angus Fogg	Angus Fogg Racing	(New Zealand) Greg Murphy
3	R3	23 March	Pukekohe Park Raceway, Pukekohe		(New Zealand) Andre Heimgartner	(New Zealand) Greg Murphy	M3 Racing	(New Zealand) Greg Murphy
4	R1	26 April	Pukekohe Park Raceway, Pukekohe	(New Zealand) Greg Murphy	(New Zealand) Greg Murphy	(New Zealand) Greg Murphy	M3 Racing	(New Zealand) Greg Murphy
4	R2	26 April	Pukekohe Park Raceway, Pukekohe		(New Zealand) Greg Murphy	(New Zealand) Greg Murphy	M3 Racing	(New Zealand) Greg Murphy
4	R3	26 April	Pukekohe Park Raceway, Pukekohe		(New Zealand) Greg Murphy	(New Zealand) Greg Murphy	M3 Racing	(New Zealand) Greg Murphy
4	R4	26 April	Pukekohe Park Raceway, Pukekohe		(New Zealand) Richard Moore	(New Zealand) Richard Moore	M3 Racing	(New Zealand) Greg Murphy

== Championship standings ==
=== Drivers' Championship ===
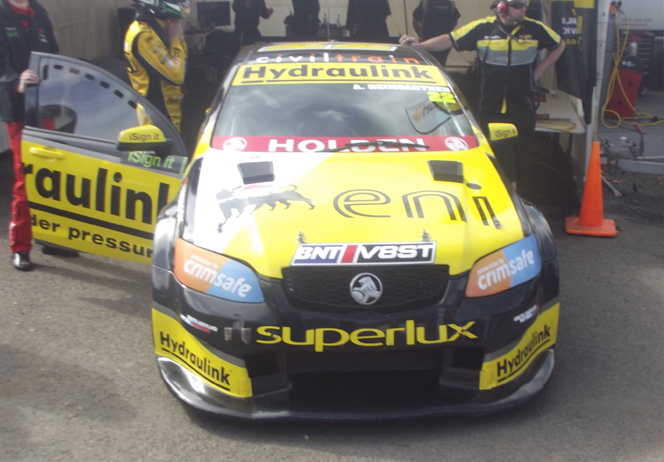
Andre Heimgartner finished 5th in 2014 in his Commodore

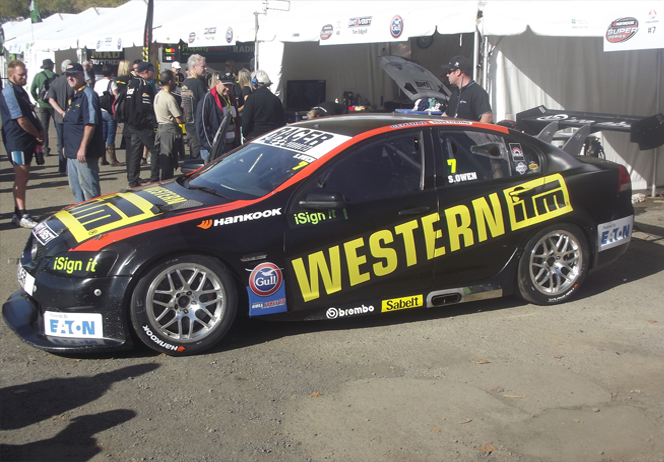
Steve Owen finished 15th in 2014 for AV8 Motorsport

Pos	Driver	No.	HIG			MAN			PUK			PUK				Pts.
Pos	Driver	No.	R1	R2	R3	R1	R2	R3	R1	R2	R3	R1	R2	R3	R4	Pts.
1	(New Zealand) Greg Murphy	1	1st	1st	1st	1st	1st	1st	1st	3rd	1st	1st	1st	1st	2nd	1155
2	(New Zealand) Simon Evans	4	Ret	3rd	9th	2nd	3rd	2nd	3rd	4th	4th	6th	5th	2nd	3rd	836
3	(New Zealand) Richard Moore	10	4th	5th	2nd	3rd	4th	5th	10th	8th	3rd	2nd	3rd	13th	1st	821
4	(New Zealand) Ant Pedersen	96	3rd	4th	10th	5th	2nd	3rd	2nd	2nd	6th	14th	13th	5th	4th	817
5	(New Zealand) Andre Heimgartner	22	2nd	2nd	4th	4th	5th	4th	4th	5th	13th	3rd	2nd	Ret	DNS	732
6	(New Zealand) Tim Edgell	8	8th	9th	7th	11th	10th	11th	6th	Ret	5th	7th	6th	6th	10th	564
7	(New Zealand) Mark Gibson	47	6th	7th	3rd	10th	9th	8th	11th	Ret	8th	12th	8th	7th	7th	549
8	(New Zealand) Mitch Cunningham	32	Ret	6th	6th	7th	Ret	7th	9th	6th	11th	9th	9th	12th	6th	543
9	(Australia) Morgan Haber	15	5th	10th	5th	9th	Ret	6th	13th	7th	2nd	10th	7th	10th	Ret	537
10	(New Zealand) Simon McLennan	26	7th	8th	8th	13th	6th	Ret	8th	12th	12th	Ret	13th	8th	8th	448
11	(New Zealand) Dominic Storey	9				8th	11th	10th	12th	9th	7th	8th	14th	9th	5th	408
12	(New Zealand) Chris Hanley	27				12th	8th	9th	14th	11th	9th	11th	11th	11th	9th	372
13	(New Zealand) Angus Fogg	3	Ret	DNS	DNS				5th	1st	14th	13th	10th	4th	Ret	314
14	(New Zealand) Andrew Waite	31							7th	10th	10th	4th	Ret	DNS	DNS	189
15	(Australia) Steve Owen	7										5th	4th	3rd	Ret	164
16	(New Zealand) Eddie Bell	69	DNS	DNS	DNS	6th	7th	12th								148
Pos	Driver	No.	HIG			MAN			PUK			PUK				Pts.

Colour	Result
Gold	Winner
Silver	Second place
Bronze	Third place
Green	Points classification
Blue	Non-points classification
Blue	Non-classified finish (NC)
Purple	Retired, not classified (Ret)
Red	Did not qualify (DNQ)
Red	Did not pre-qualify (DNPQ)
Black	Disqualified (DSQ)
White	Did not start (DNS)
White	Withdrew (WD)
White	Race cancelled (C)
Blank	Did not practice (DNP)
Blank	Did not arrive (DNA)
Blank	Excluded (EX)
