= 2013 V8SuperTourer season =

2013 V8SuperTourer

Seasons
- ← 2012 2014 →

Scott McLaughlin, the defending drivers' champion

The 2013 V8SuperTourer season is a motor racing championship for touring cars held in New Zealand. The season started on 16 February at Hampton Downs Motorsport Park and ended on 8 December at Pukekohe Park Raceway after seven rounds. All cars used a chassis built by Paul Ceprnich of Pace Innovations in Australia, and were powered by a Chevrolet LS7 7-litre engine.

While the chassis and engines are the same (to provide a level playing field and hopefully allow the best drivers to succeed due to talent, not equipment), the cars can 'wear' body panels from any suitable model. So far, cars have appeared as either the Ford Falcon or Holden Commodore, but the chassis has a generic enough shape that a manufacturer such as Toyota or BMW could likely fit their bodywork to a Supertourer chassis and race as Lexus or 5 Series model.

There were to be 24 cars on the grid in Round 1 at Hampton Downs Motorsport Park with talks that there also may be a Hyundai on the grid as well. It was confirmed that New Zealand Business BNT Automotive would be the official sponsor of the V8SuperTourer.

Scott McLaughlin started the season as the defending drivers' champion.

== Calendar ==
The 2013 V8SuperTourer season consisted of seven rounds, although only six were confirmed. The dates for round 6 were set for 9 and 10 November:

Details
Rnd.	Event	Circuit	City / state	Date
1	The Rock Rumble	Hampton Downs Motorsport Park	North Waikato, New Zealand	15–17 February
2	Mike Pero Need for Speed	Powerbuilt Tools Raceway	Christchurch, New Zealand	9–10 March
3	Brother 350	Pukekohe Park Raceway	Pukekohe, New Zealand	25–26 May
4	Gull 250	Ricoh Taupo Motorsport Park	Taupō, New Zealand	31 Aug–1 Sept
5	Aegis Oils Waikato 400	Hampton Downs Motorsport Park	North Waikato, New Zealand	28–29 September
6	Hampton 400	Hampton Downs Motorsport Park	North Waikato, New Zealand	19–20 October
7	Mike Pero 500	Pukekohe Park Raceway	Pukekohe, New Zealand	29 Nov–1 Dec

Key:

Race forms part of the V8 SuperTourers Championship.
Race forms part of the V8 SuperTourers Championship and the Endurance Series.

== Teams and drivers ==
Greg Murphy's Championship winning Commodore at the Pukekohe 500

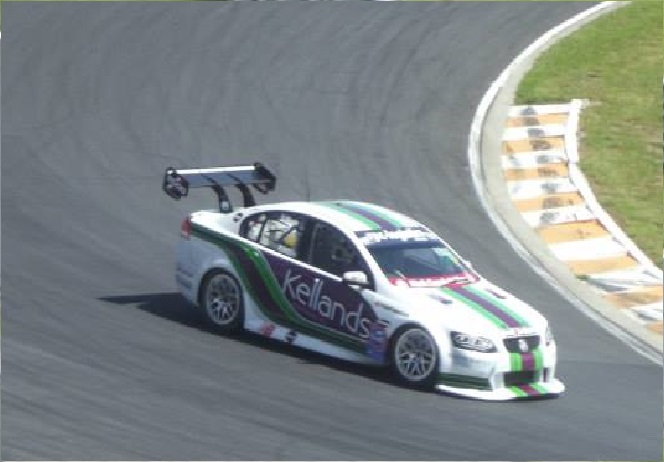
Richard Moore's Holden Commodore which finished fourth overall in 2013

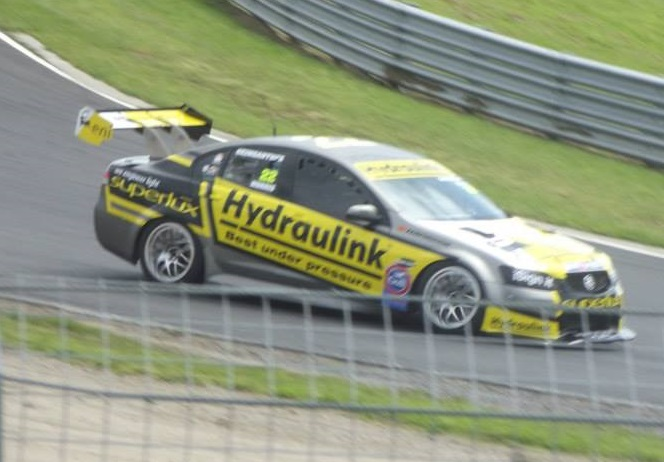
Andre Heimgartner's MPC Motorsport Commodore which finished seventh overall in 2013

The following teams and drivers competed during the 2013 V8SuperTourer season.

Manufacturer	Vehicle	Team	No.	Driver	Rounds
Holden	Commodore (VE)	Scott McLaughlin Racing	1	(New Zealand) Scott McLaughlin	All
Holden	Commodore (VE)	Angus Fogg Racing	3	(New Zealand) Angus Fogg	All
Holden	Commodore (VE)	Edgell Performance Racing	8	(New Zealand) Tim Edgell	All
Holden	Commodore (VE)	M3 Racing	10	(New Zealand) Richard Moore	All
Holden	Commodore (VE)	M3 Racing	15	(New Zealand) Paul Manuell	All
Holden	Commodore (VE)	M3 Racing	51	(New Zealand) Greg Murphy	All
Holden	Commodore (VE)	Farmer Racing Services	11	(New Zealand) Simon Evans	All
Holden	Commodore (VE)	MPC Motorsport	12	(Australia) Ashley Walsh	1–4
Holden	Commodore (VE)	MPC Motorsport	12	(Australia) Garry Jacobson	5–7
Holden	Commodore (VE)	MPC Motorsport	22	(New Zealand) Andre Heimgartner	All
Holden	Commodore (VE)	AV8 Motorsport	23	(New Zealand) Andy Booth	All
Holden	Commodore (VE)	M2 Racing	26	(New Zealand) Simon McLennan	1–3, 7
Ford	Falcon (FG)	iSport Racing	9	(New Zealand) Dominic Storey	All
Ford	Falcon (FG)	PSR Racing	27	(New Zealand) Craig Baird	1–2, 5–7
Ford	Falcon (FG)	PSR Racing	27	(New Zealand) Kayne Scott	3
Ford	Falcon (FG)	PSR Racing	27	(New Zealand) Daniel Gaunt	4
Ford	Falcon (FG)	Tasman Motorsports Group	31	(New Zealand) Daniel Gaunt	1–3, 5–7
Ford	Falcon (FG)	Tasman Motorsports Group	31	(New Zealand) Andrew Waite	4
Ford	Falcon (FG)	Cunningham Racing	32	(New Zealand) Mitch Cunningham	All
Ford	Falcon (FG)	John McIntyre Racing	47	(New Zealand) John McIntyre	All
Ford	Falcon (FG)	Eddie Bell Racing	69	(New Zealand) Eddie Bell	All
Ford	Falcon (FG)	International Motorsport	96	(New Zealand) Ant Pedersen	All
Ford	Falcon (FG)	MPC Motorsport	97	(New Zealand) Shane van Gisbergen	All

Endurance entries
Team	No.	Season driver	Endurance driver	Rounds
Scott McLaughlin Racing	1	(New Zealand) Scott McLaughlin	(Australia) Jonathon Webb	5–6
Scott McLaughlin Racing	1	(New Zealand) Scott McLaughlin	(Australia) James Moffat	7
Angus Fogg Racing	3	(New Zealand) Angus Fogg	(Australia) Dale Wood	5–7
Edgell Performance Racing	8	(New Zealand) Tim Edgell	(Australia) Lee Holdsworth	5–7
iSport Racing	9	(New Zealand) Dominic Storey	(New Zealand) Mark Gibson	5–7
M3 Racing	10	(New Zealand) Richard Moore	(Australia) Tim Slade	5–7
M3 Racing	15	(New Zealand) Paul Manuell	(New Zealand) John Penny	5
M3 Racing	15	(New Zealand) Paul Manuell	(Australia) Nick Percat	6–7
M3 Racing	51	(New Zealand) Greg Murphy	(Australia) Jack Perkins	5–7
Farmer Racing Services	11	(New Zealand) Simon Evans	(New Zealand) Jonny Reid	5–7
MPC Motorsport	12	(Australia) Garry Jacobson	(Australia) Geoff Emery	5, 7
MPC Motorsport	12	(Australia) Garry Jacobson	(Australia) Drew Russell	6
MPC Motorsport	22	(New Zealand) Andre Heimgartner	(Australia) Paul Morris	5–7
MPC Motorsport	97	(New Zealand) Shane van Gisbergen	(Australia) Alex Davison	5–7
AV8 Motorsport	23	(New Zealand) Andy Booth	(Australia) Shae Davies	5–7
M2 Racing	26	(New Zealand) Simon McLennan	(Australia) Cameron Waters	7
PSR Racing	27	(New Zealand) Craig Baird	(New Zealand) Matt Lockwood	5–7
Tasman Motorsports Group	31	(New Zealand) Daniel Gaunt	(New Zealand) Andrew Waite	5–7
Cunningham Racing	32	(New Zealand) Mitch Cunningham	(New Zealand) Wade Cunningham	5
Cunningham Racing	32	(New Zealand) Mitch Cunningham	(Australia) Tony D'Alberto	6–7
John McIntyre Racing	47	(New Zealand) John McIntyre	(New Zealand) Jono Lester	5–6
John McIntyre Racing	47	(New Zealand) John McIntyre	(Australia) Warren Luff	7
Eddie Bell Racing	69	(New Zealand) Eddie Bell	(Australia) Nick McBride	5
Eddie Bell Racing	69	(New Zealand) Eddie Bell	(Australia) Steve Owen	6–7
International Motorsport	96	(New Zealand) Ant Pedersen	(Australia) Chaz Mostert	5–7

== Results ==
The season started at Hampton Downs Motorsport Park and finished at Pukekohe Park Raceway for the annual Pukekohe 500.

Round		Date	Circuit	Pole position	Fastest lap	Winning driver	Winning team	Round winner(s)
1	R1	17 February	Hampton Downs Motorsport Park	(New Zealand) Ant Pedersen	(New Zealand) Greg Murphy	(New Zealand) Greg Murphy	M3 Racing	(New Zealand) Greg Murphy
1	R2	17 February	Hampton Downs Motorsport Park		(New Zealand) Richard Moore	(New Zealand) Greg Murphy	M3 Racing	(New Zealand) Greg Murphy
1	R3	17 February	Hampton Downs Motorsport Park		(New Zealand) Greg Murphy	(New Zealand) Greg Murphy	M3 Racing	(New Zealand) Greg Murphy
2	R1	10 March	Powerbuilt Tools Raceway	(New Zealand) Ant Pedersen	(New Zealand) Scott McLaughlin	(New Zealand) Daniel Gaunt	Tasman Motorsports	(New Zealand) Daniel Gaunt
2	R2	10 March	Powerbuilt Tools Raceway		(New Zealand) Scott McLaughlin	(New Zealand) Daniel Gaunt	Tasman Motorsports	(New Zealand) Daniel Gaunt
2	R3	10 March	Powerbuilt Tools Raceway		(New Zealand) Ant Pedersen	(New Zealand) Ant Pedersen	International Motorsport	(New Zealand) Daniel Gaunt
3	R1	26 March	Pukekohe Park Raceway	(New Zealand) Shane van Gisbergen	(New Zealand) Shane van Gisbergen	(New Zealand) Shane van Gisbergen	MPC Motorsport	(New Zealand) Shane van Gisbergen
3	R2	26 March	Pukekohe Park Raceway		(New Zealand) Shane van Gisbergen	(New Zealand) Shane van Gisbergen	MPC Motorsport	(New Zealand) Shane van Gisbergen
3	R3	26 March	Pukekohe Park Raceway		(New Zealand) Greg Murphy	(New Zealand) Greg Murphy	M3 Racing	(New Zealand) Shane van Gisbergen
4	R1	7 September	Ricoh Taupo Motorsport Park	(New Zealand) Scott McLaughlin	(New Zealand) Andre Heimgartner	(New Zealand) Shane van Gisbergen	MPC Motorsport	(New Zealand) Shane van Gisbergen
4	R2	7 September	Ricoh Taupo Motorsport Park	(New Zealand) Scott McLaughlin	(New Zealand) Ant Pedersen	(New Zealand) Ant Pedersen	International Motorsport	(New Zealand) Shane van Gisbergen
4	R3	7 September	Ricoh Taupo Motorsport Park		(New Zealand) Andy Booth	(New Zealand) Andy Booth	AV8 Motorsport	(New Zealand) Shane van Gisbergen
5	R1	29 September	Hampton Downs Motorsport Park	(Australia) Tim Slade	(Australia) Lee Holdsworth	(New Zealand) Greg Murphy (Australia) Jack Perkins	M3 Racing	(New Zealand) Shane van Gisbergen (Australia) Alex Davison
5	R2	29 September	Hampton Downs Motorsport Park	(New Zealand) Shane van Gisbergen	(Australia) Lee Holdsworth	(Australia) Lee Holdsworth (New Zealand) Tim Edgell	Edgell Performance Racing	(New Zealand) Shane van Gisbergen (Australia) Alex Davison
5	R3	29 September	Hampton Downs Motorsport Park		(Australia) Lee Holdsworth	(New Zealand) Ant Pedersen (Australia) Chaz Mostert	International Motorsport	(New Zealand) Shane van Gisbergen (Australia) Alex Davison
6	R1	20 October	Hampton Downs Motorsport Park	(New Zealand) Richard Moore	(Australia) Tim Slade	(New Zealand) Greg Murphy (Australia) Jack Perkins	M3 Racing	(New Zealand) Ant Pedersen (Australia) Chaz Mostert
6	R2	20 October	Hampton Downs Motorsport Park	(Australia) Tim Slade	(Australia) Tim Slade	(New Zealand) Richard Moore (Australia) Tim Slade	M3 Racing	(New Zealand) Ant Pedersen (Australia) Chaz Mostert
6	R3	20 October	Hampton Downs Motorsport Park		(New Zealand) Ant Pedersen	(New Zealand) Ant Pedersen (Australia) Chaz Mostert	International Motorsport	(New Zealand) Ant Pedersen (Australia) Chaz Mostert
7	R1	1 December	Pukekohe Park Raceway	(New Zealand) Shane van Gisbergen	(New Zealand) Shane van Gisbergen	(New Zealand) Shane van Gisbergen (Australia) Alex Davison	MPC Motorsport	(New Zealand) Scott McLaughlin (Australia) James Moffat
7	R2	1 December	Pukekohe Park Raceway	(Australia) Lee Holdsworth	(Australia) Lee Holdsworth	(Australia) Lee Holdsworth (New Zealand) Tim Edgell	Edgell Performance Racing	(New Zealand) Scott McLaughlin (Australia) James Moffat
7	R3	1 December	Pukekohe Park Raceway		(New Zealand) Greg Murphy	(New Zealand) Scott McLaughlin (Australia) James Moffat	Scott McLaughlin Racing	(New Zealand) Scott McLaughlin (Australia) James Moffat

== Event summaries ==
=== The Rock Rumble ===
Results
Event 1	Race 1	Race 2	Race 3
Pole position	(New Zealand) Ant Pedersen (International Motorsport)		
Race winner	(New Zealand) Greg Murphy (M3 Racing)	(New Zealand) Greg Murphy (M3 Racing)	(New Zealand) Greg Murphy (M3 Racing)

Greg Murphy won all three of the races at the season opener at Hampton Downs Motorsport Park continuing his great form at the North Waikato Track. Ant Pedersen also shone at the season opener claiming Pole Position and two second placings, a great result for the young driver from International Motorsport. The event also saw Front Running Kiwi V8 Supercar Driver Shane van Gisbergen join the series, in one of the MPC Motorsport Cars; he would eventually finish third for the round.

=== Mike Pero Need for Speed ===
Results
Event 2	Race 1	Race 2	Race 3
Pole position	(New Zealand) Ant Pedersen (International Motorsport)		
Race winner	(New Zealand) Daniel Gaunt (Tasman Motorsports)	(New Zealand) Daniel Gaunt (Tasman Motorsports)	(New Zealand) Ant Pedersen (International Motorsport)

Round 2 of the Series at Ruapuna saw Ant Pedersen claim another Pole Position, this time over Shane van Gisbergen. But Ant Pedersen wasn't the only Ford driver with speed, Tasman Motorsports driver Daniel Gaunt managed to claim the first two races then finishing Race 3 in second giving the Ford driver the Round Victory. Championship Leader Greg Murphy finished second in the first two races but had car troubles in the final giving him a DNF and dropping him to 6th in the Round.

=== Brother 350 ===
Results
Event 3	Race 1	Race 2	Race 3
Pole position	(New Zealand) Shane van Gisbergen (MPC Motorsport)		
Race winner	(New Zealand) Shane van Gisbergen (MPC Motorsport)	(New Zealand) Shane van Gisbergen (MPC Motorsport)	(New Zealand) Greg Murphy (M3 Racing)

Round 3 of the Series was held at the home of New Zealand Motorsport Pukekohe Park Raceway, where everyone thought hometown hero Greg Murphy would clean up, which wasn't the case. Shane van Gisbergen dominated the weekend claiming Pole then the first two races before Greg Murphy snatched the last race but because of the two victories Shane held on for the Round Victory. Resigning Champion Scott McLaughlin returned to the podium for the first time in 2013 claiming two-thirds and a fourth.

=== Gull 250 ===
Results
Event 4	Race 1	Race 2	Race 3
Pole position	(New Zealand) Scott McLaughlin (Scott McLaughlin Racing)	(New Zealand) Scott McLaughlin (Scott McLaughlin Racing)	
Race winner	(New Zealand) Shane van Gisbergen (MPC Motorsport)	(New Zealand) Ant Pedersen (International Motorsport)	(New Zealand) Andy Booth (AV8 Motorsport)

Round 4 of the Series was the final Sprint Series Round which was held in Taupō, where the fight was between Greg Murphy and Ant Pedersen for the Sprint Series Crown. Scott McLaughlin showed fantastic speed all weekend claiming both Pole Positions, but sadly had rotten luck in the races including a big start line crash in Race 3. Shane van Gisbergen eventually won the round over Andy Booth (who won Race 3) and Ant Pedersen (who won Race 2), but sadly for Ant he didn't get the points he needed to stop Greg Murphy from winning the 2013 Sprint Series Championship.

=== Aegis Oils Waikato 400 ===
Results
Event 5	Race 1	Race 2	Race 3
Pole position	(New Zealand) Richard Moore and (Australia) Tim Slade (M3 Racing)		
Race winner	(New Zealand) Greg Murphy and (Australia) Jack Perkins (M3 Racing)	(New Zealand) Tim Edgell and (Australia) Lee Holdsworth (Edgell Performance Racing)	(New Zealand) Ant Pedersen and (Australia) Chaz Mostert (International Motorsport)

Round 5 of the season was the first Endurance Season round with many Australian Drivers making the trip to come over. The weekend saw different race winners for each race with Hampton Downs King Greg Murphy taking out Race 1 with 2012 co-driver Jack Perkins, Race 2 saw Tim Edgell and Lee Holdsworth claim their first race wins in V8SuperTourer. Then in Race 3 the International Motorsport duo of Ant Pedersen and Chaz Mostert managed to win. Because of great consistency Shane van Gisbergen and Alex Davison managed to win the round, the third round win in a row for Shane.

=== Hampton 400 ===
Results
Event 6	Race 1	Race 2	Race 3
Pole position	(New Zealand) Richard Moore and (Australia) Tim Slade (M3 Racing)		
Race winner	(New Zealand) Greg Murphy and (Australia) Jack Perkins (M3 Racing)	(New Zealand) Richard Moore and (Australia) Tim Slade (M3 Racing)	(New Zealand) Ant Pedersen and (Australia) Chaz Mostert (International Motorsport)

Round 6 of the season saw many of the same results as Round 6 with Greg Murphy taking out Race 1 with Jack Perkins, Race 2 saw Richard Moore and Tim Slade claim their first race wins in V8SuperTourer. Then in Race 3 the International Motorsport duo of Ant Pedersen and Chaz Mostert managed to win the final race again just like Round 5, but this team the Ford drivers of Ant and Chaz also claimed the round, giving Ant Pedersen the overall Series lead over Greg Murphy going into the final round.

=== Mike Pero 500 ===
Results
Event 7	Race 1	Race 2	Race 3
Pole position	(New Zealand) Shane van Gisbergen and (Australia) Alex Davison (MPC Motorsport)		
Race winner	(New Zealand) Shane van Gisbergen and (Australia) Alex Davison (MPC Motorsport)	(New Zealand) Tim Edgell and (Australia) Lee Holdsworth (Edgell Performance Racing)	(New Zealand) Scott McLaughlin and (Australia) James Moffat (Scott McLaughlin Racing)

The Mike Pero 500 was the 7th and final round of the 2013 V8 SuperTourer Championship which ended up coming down between Ant Pedersen, Greg Murphy and Shane van Gisbergen. The first race saw Shane van Gisbergen take the first strike at the title winning Race 1 with Alex Davison before having car troubles putting them out of Race 2 and 3 and ending his hopes at the title leaving it between Greg Murphy and Ant Pedersen. After the first race Greg Murphy managed to take over the Series lead after finishing second; then in Race 2 Ant Pedersen retook the lead of the Series by 45 points. Then in the final race Greg Murphy managed to finish second with Ant Pedersen finishing 5th giving Murphy the 2013 Crown. The weekend also saw Scott McLaughlin return to the winners' circle claiming his first and only race win of the season with James Moffat alongside him.

Championship leader table
Round	Championship leader	Lead
The Rock Rumble	(New Zealand) Greg Murphy	197
Mike Pero Need for Speed	(New Zealand) Greg Murphy	59
Brother 350	(New Zealand) Greg Murphy	208
Gull 250	(New Zealand) Greg Murphy	174
Aegis Oils Waikato 400	(New Zealand) Greg Murphy	74
Hampton 400	(New Zealand) Ant Pedersen	90
Mike Pero 500	(New Zealand) Greg Murphy	28

== Championship standings ==
=== Drivers' Championship ===
Pos	Driver	HAM			RUA			PUK			TAU			HAM			HAM			PUK			Pts.
Pos	Driver	R1	R2	R3	R1	R2	R3	R1	R2	R3	R1	R2	R3	R1	R2	R3	R1	R2	R3	R1	R2	R3	Pts.
1	(New Zealand) Greg Murphy	1st	**1st**	**1st**	2nd	2nd	Ret	2nd	2nd	1st	7th	4th	10th	1st	Ret	3rd	1st	10th	2nd	2nd	5th	2nd	3559
2	(New Zealand) Ant Pedersen	**2nd**	2nd	6th	**8th**	6th	1st	4th	3rd	4th	9th	1st	11th	16th	3rd	1st	2nd	2nd	1st	4th	3rd	5th	3531
3	(New Zealand) Shane van Gisbergen	8th	4th	2nd	15th	Ret	12th	**1st**	**1st**	**2nd**	1st	7th	2nd	5th	4th	4th	3rd	12th	5th	1st	Ret	DNS	3066
4	(New Zealand) Richard Moore	3rd	3rd	7th	5th	9th	5th	7th	Ret	Ret	17th	5th	5th	2nd	10th	2nd	Ret	1st	3rd	3rd	4th	3rd	2878
5	(New Zealand) Scott McLaughlin	Ret	Ret	Ret	17th	7th	Ret	3rd	4th	3rd	2nd	9th	Ret	4th	2nd	Ret	Ret	3rd	6th	5th	2nd	1st	2744
6	(New Zealand) Daniel Gaunt	10th	7th	12th	1st	**1st**	**2nd**	9th	6th	7th	6th	8th	Ret	3rd	5th	Ret	6th	6th	10th	8th	9th	Ret	2412
7	(New Zealand) Andre Heimgartner	11th	14th	11th	3rd	4th	10th	6th	7th	5th	3rd	6th	8th	8th	8th	7th	12th	15th	9th	12th	6th	12th	2237
8	(New Zealand) Tim Edgell	5th	12th	14th	13th	15th	9th	5th	Ret	8th	15th	17th	7th	6th	1st	15th	8th	Ret	4th	16th	1st	4th	1931
9	(Australia) Chaz Mostert													16th	3rd	1st	2nd	2nd	1st	4th	3rd	5th	1899
10	(New Zealand) Paul Manuell	4th	6th	10th	9th	12th	7th	10th	12th	6th	13th	12th	4th	9th	DNS	10th	5th	7th	7th	11th	Ret	10th	1871
11	(Australia) Tim Slade													2nd	10th	2nd	Ret	1st	3rd	3rd	4th	3rd	1718
12	(New Zealand) Craig Baird	Ret	15th	4th	4th	3rd	4th							Ret	6th	5th	7th	5th	8th	15th	12th	Ret	1710
13	(New Zealand) Andy Booth	Ret	9th	9th	16th	14th	8th	Ret	DNS	DNS	11th	3rd	1st	7th	Ret	8th	10th	Ret	Ret	9th	8th	11th	1701
14	(Australia) Jack Perkins													1st	Ret	3rd	1st	10th	2nd	2nd	5th	2nd	1696
15	(New Zealand) John McIntyre	12th	5th	3rd	7th	16th	6th	13th	5th	Ret	4th	2nd	Ret	15th	14th	DNS	13th	Ret	14th	Ret	7th	6th	1667
16	(New Zealand) Simon Evans	6th	11th	Ret	10th	8th	Ret	Ret	8th	Ret	8th	14th	3rd	14th	7th	14th	4th	4th	Ret	18th	10th	Ret	1548
17	(New Zealand) Eddie Bell	Ret	Ret	8th	DNS	DNS	DNS	8th	Ret	10th	16th	13th	9th	12th	13th	9th	9th	9th	11th	10th	Ret	9th	1270
18	(Australia) Alex Davison													5th	4th	4th	3rd	12th	5th	1st	Ret	DNS	1232
19	(Australia) Lee Holdsworth													6th	1st	15th	8th	Ret	4th	16th	1st	4th	1232
20	(New Zealand) Angus Fogg	Ret	13th	13th	12th	10th	11th	Ret	13th	Ret	14th	11th	6th	Ret	9th	11th	14th	11th	12th	17th	11th	7th	1203
21	(New Zealand) Andrew Waite										18th	16th	12th	3rd	5th	Ret	6th	6th	10th	8th	9th	Ret	1141
22	(New Zealand) Dominic Storey	Ret	10th	15th	11th	11th	Ret	Ret	9th	9th	12th	10th	Ret	11th	12th	13th	Ret	13th	15th	14th	14th	13th	1019
23	(Australia) Paul Morris													8th	8th	7th	12th	15th	9th	12th	6th	12th	968
24	(Australia) Ashley Walsh	Ret	8th	5th	6th	5th	3rd	Ret	DNS	DNS	5th	Ret	Ret										961
25	(New Zealand) Matt Lockwood													Ret	6th	5th	7th	5th	8th	15th	12th	Ret	960
26	(Australia) Gary Jacobson													10th	11th	6th	11th	8th	Ret	13th	13th	8th	947
27	(New Zealand) Mitch Cunningham	9th	17th	Ret	14th	13th	Ret	Ret	11th	11th	10th	15th	Ret	13th	Ret	12th	15th	14th	13th	7th	15th	Ret	929
28	(Australia) Jonathon Webb													4th	2nd	Ret	Ret	3rd	6th				836
29	(Australia) James Moffat																			5th	2nd	1st	711
30	(New Zealand) Jonny Reid													14th	7th	14th	4th	4th	Ret	18th	10th	Ret	700
31	(Australia) Shae Davies													7th	Ret	8th	10th	Ret	Ret	9th	8th	11th	660
32	(Australia) Geoff Emery													10th	11th	6th				13th	13th	8th	629
33	(Australia) Dale Wood													Ret	9th	11th	14th	11th	12th	17th	11th	7th	605
34	(Australia) Steve Owen																9th	9th	11th	10th	Ret	9th	502
35	(Australia) Nick Percat																5th	7th	7th	11th	Ret	10th	478
36	(New Zealand) Mark Gibson													11th	12th	13th	Ret	13th	15th	14th	14th	13th	383
37	(Australia) Tony D'Alberto																15th	14th	13th	7th	15th	Ret	383
38	(New Zealand) Simon McLennan	7th	16th	16th	Ret	17th	DNS	12th	Ret	DNS										6th	16th	Ret	374
39	(Australia) Drew Russell																11th	8th	Ret				318
40	(Australia) Nick McBride													12th	13th	9th							277
41	(Australia) Warren Luff																			Ret	7th	6th	236
42	(New Zealand) Kayne Scott							11th	10th	12th													219
43	(New Zealand) Jono Lester													15th	14th	DNS	13th	Ret	14th				217
44	(New Zealand) John Penny													9th	DNS	10th							202
45	(New Zealand) Wade Cunningham													13th	Ret	12th							150
46	(Australia) Cameron Waters																			6th	16th	Ret	80
Pos	Driver	Rd 1			Rd 2			Rd 3			Rd 4			Rd 5			Rd 6			Rd 7			Pts.

Colour	Result
Gold	Winner
Silver	Second place
Bronze	Third place
Green	Points classification
Blue	Non-points classification
Blue	Non-classified finish (NC)
Purple	Retired, not classified (Ret)
Red	Did not qualify (DNQ)
Red	Did not pre-qualify (DNPQ)
Black	Disqualified (DSQ)
White	Did not start (DNS)
White	Withdrew (WD)
White	Race cancelled (C)
Blank	Did not practice (DNP)
Blank	Did not arrive (DNA)
Blank	Excluded (EX)

=== Endurance Series standings ===
Pos.	Drivers	No.	**HAM**; **1**	**HAM**; **2**	**HAM**; **3**	**HAM2**; **1**	**HAM2**; **2**	**HAM2**; **3**	**PUK**; **1**	**PUK**; **2**	Pen.	Pts.
1	(New Zealand) Ant Pedersen (Australia) Chaz Mostert	96	16th	3rd	1st	2nd	2nd	1st			0	1313
2	(New Zealand) Richard Moore (Australia) Tim Slade	10	2nd	10th	2nd	Ret	1st	3rd			0	1094
3	(New Zealand) Greg Murphy (Australia) Jack Perkins	51	1st	Ret	3rd	1st	10th	2nd			0	1049
4	(New Zealand) Shane van Gisbergen (Australia) Alex Davison	97	5th	4th	4th	3rd	12th	5th			0	1022
5	(New Zealand) Scott McLaughlin (Australia) Jonathon Webb	1	4th	2nd	Ret	Ret	3rd	6th			0	836
6	(New Zealand) Craig Baird (New Zealand) Matt Lockwood	27	Ret	6th	5th	7th	5th	8th			0	820
7	(New Zealand) Daniel Gaunt (New Zealand) Andrew Waite	31	3rd	5th	Ret	6th	6th	10th			0	770
8	(New Zealand) Tim Edgell (Australia) Lee Holdsworth	8	6th	1st	15th	8th	Ret	4th			50	762
9	(Australia) Gary Jacobson (Australia) Drew Russell (Australia) Geoff Emery	12	10th	11th	6th	11th	8th	Ret			0	677
10	(New Zealand) Paul Manuell (Australia) Nick Percat (New Zealand) John Penny	15	9th	DNS	10th	5th	7th	7th			0	651
11	(New Zealand) Simon Evans (New Zealand) Jonny Reid	11	14th	7th	14th	4th	4th	Ret			0	651
12	(New Zealand) Andre Heimgartner (Australia) Paul Morris	22	8th	8th	7th	12th	15th	9th			0	634
13	(New Zealand) Eddie Bell (Australia) Steve Owen (Australia) Nick McBride	69	12th	13th	9th	9th	9th	11th			0	586
14	(New Zealand) Angus Fogg (Australia) Dale Wood	3	Ret	9th	11th	14th	11th	12th			25	420
15	(New Zealand) Dominic Storey (New Zealand) Mark Gibson	9	11th	12th	13th	Ret	13th	15th			25	371
16	(New Zealand) Mitch Cunningham (Australia) Tony D'Alberto (New Zealand) Wade Cunningham	32	13th	Ret	12th	15th	14th	13th			0	358
17	(New Zealand) Andy Booth (Australia) Shae Davies	23	7th	Ret	8th	10th	Ret	Ret			0	326
18	(New Zealand) John McIntyre (New Zealand) Jono Lester	47	15th	14th	DNS	13th	Ret	14th			0	217
Pos.	Drivers	No.	**HAM**; **1**	**HAM**; **2**	**HAM**; **3**	**HAM2**; **1**	**HAM2**; **2**	**HAM2**; **3**	**PUK**; **1**	**PUK**; **2**	Pen.	Pts.

Colour	Result
Gold	Winner
Silver	Second place
Bronze	Third place
Green	Points classification
Blue	Non-points classification
Blue	Non-classified finish (NC)
Purple	Retired, not classified (Ret)
Red	Did not qualify (DNQ)
Red	Did not pre-qualify (DNPQ)
Black	Disqualified (DSQ)
White	Did not start (DNS)
White	Withdrew (WD)
White	Race cancelled (C)
Blank	Did not practice (DNP)
Blank	Did not arrive (DNA)
Blank	Excluded (EX)

**Bold** - Pole position
Italics - Fastest lap

== See also ==
V8SuperTourer
