= Tim Edgell =

New Zealand racing driver (born 1980)

- Nationality: New Zealander
- Born: 8 August 1980 (age 46)

V8SuperTourer career
- Debut season: 2012
- Current team: Edgell Performance Racing
- Car number: 8
- Starts: 10
- Wins: 1
- Poles: 1
- Fastest laps: 0
- Best finish: 8th in 2013

Previous series
- 2011–12: New Zealand V8s

Tim Edgell (born 8 August 1980) is a racing driver from New Zealand.

== Career ==
=== V8 SuperTourers ===
In mid-2012, Edgell joined the all new V8SuperTourer category. He drives for his own private team, Edgell Performance Racing, supported by his father, engineer Randel Edgell. It was a successful three rounds for the team, as they managed to claim a pole position at the final meeting, at Ruapuna.

In 2013, the team's first full season, they managed a race win with V8 Supercar driver Lee Holdsworth sharing the car with Edgell.

== Racing record ==
=== Career summary ===
| Season | Series | Team | Races | Wins | Poles | F/Laps | Podiums | Points | Position |
|---|---|---|---|---|---|---|---|---|---|
| 2001-02 | New Zealand Formula Ford Championship | | 7 | 0 | 0 | 0 | 0 | 57 | 20th |
| 2002-03 | New Zealand Formula Ford Championship | | 15 | 0 | 0 | 0 | 1 | 205 | 8th |
| 2003-04 | New Zealand Formula Ford Championship | | 19 | 4 | 6 | 3 | 9 | 371 | 1st |
| 2005 | Toyota Racing Series | EPR | 14 | 0 | 0 | 0 | 0 | 475 | 12th |
| 2006-07 | New Zealand V8s | Ford Drivers | 20 | 0 | 0 | 0 | 0 | 372 | 20th |
| 2007-08 | New Zealand V8s | Edgell Performance Racing | 16 | 0 | 0 | 0 | 1 | 383 | 15th |
| 2008-09 | New Zealand V8s | Edgell Performance Racing | 20 | 0 | 0 | 0 | 0 | 631 | 10th |
| 2009-10 | New Zealand V8s | Edgell Performance Racing | 18 | 1 | 1 | 7 | 7 | 855 | 4th |
| 2010-11 | New Zealand V8s | Edgell Performance Racing | 21 | 2 | 0 | 2 | 6 | 824 | 6th |
| 2011-12 | New Zealand V8s | Edgell Performance Racing | 12 | 2 | 1 | 0 | 5 | 583 | 4th |
| 2012 | V8 SuperTourers | Edgell Performance Racing | 6 | 0 | 0 | 0 | 1 | 488 | 22nd |
| 2013 | V8 SuperTourers | Edgell Performance Racing | 21 | 2 | 0 | 0 | 2 | 1931 | 8th |
| 2014 | V8 SuperTourers | Edgell Performance Racing | 13 | 0 | 0 | 0 | 0 | 564 | 6th |
| 2014-15 | V8 SuperTourers | Edgell Performance Racing | 11 | 0 | 0 | 0 | 3 | 962 | 7th |
| 2015-16 | NZ Touring Cars Championship | Tim Edgell Racing | 20 | 0 | 1 | 0 | 5 | 1073 | 2nd |
| 2018-19 | GT1 New Zealand Racing Series | | 3 | 1 | 0 | 1 | 1 | 271 | 10th |
| 2020-21 | Racer Products NZV8s Championship | Tim Edgell Racing | 12 | 6 | 1 | 4 | 11 | 522 | 1st |
| 2020-21 | New Zealand Sports Car Series | Tim Edgell Racing | 3 | 0 | 0 | 0 | 3 | 0 | NC |
| 2022 | Racer Products NZV8s Championship | Tim Edgell Racing | 5 | 4 | 0 | 5 | 4 | 140 | 1st |
