= 2012 V8SuperTourer season =

2012 V8SuperTourer

Seasons
- ← none 2013 →

The 2012 V8SuperTourer season is a motor racing championship for touring cars held in New Zealand. It began on 17 February at Hampton Downs Motorsport Park and ended on the 25 November at Powerbuilt Tools Raceway, Ruapuna after seven rounds. All cars use a chassis built by Paul Ceprnich of Pace Innovations in Australia, and are powered a Mosler 7-litre engine.

While the chassis and engines are the same (to provide a level playing field and hopefully allow the best drivers to succeed due to talent, not equipment), the cars can 'wear' body panels from any suitable model. So far, cars have appeared as either the Ford Falcon or Holden Commodore, but the chassis are a generic enough shape that a manufacturer such as Toyota or BMW could likely fit their bodywork to a Supertourer chassis and race as Lexus or 5 Series model.

16 cars were confirmed to run in the inaugural season. The V8SuperTourer also confirmed an exclusive broadcasting deal with TV3 to screen all of the races live on the Gillette Motorsport show.

== Teams and drivers ==
The following teams and drivers competed during the 2012 V8SuperTourer season.

Team	Vehicle	No	Driver	Co-driver	Rounds
International Motorsport	Ford Falcon (FG)	2	(New Zealand) Jonny Reid	(New Zealand) Wade Cunningham	All
International Motorsport	Ford Falcon (FG)	32	(New Zealand) Mitch Cunningham	(Australia) Dean Canto	5–7
International Motorsport	Ford Falcon (FG)	96	(New Zealand) Ant Pedersen	(New Zealand) Matt Halliday (Australia) Alex Davison	All
Knight Motorsport	Ford Falcon (FG)	5	(New Zealand) Andy Knight	—N/a	1–4
Edgell Performance Racing	Holden Commodore (VE)	8	(New Zealand) Tim Edgell	(New Zealand) Nick Chester (New Zealand) Chris van der Drift	All
MPC Motorsport	Holden Commodore (VE)	12	(Australia) Geoff Emery	(Austria) Christian Klien (Australia) Steve Owen	1–2, 4–7
MPC Motorsport	Holden Commodore (VE)	93	(New Zealand) Scott McLaughlin	(Australia) Jonathon Webb	1–2, 4–7
M3 Racing	Holden Commodore (VE)	10	(New Zealand) Richard Moore	(Australia) Owen Kelly	All
M3 Racing	Holden Commodore (VE)	15	(New Zealand) Paul Manuell	(New Zealand) Scott Harrison (New Zealand) John Penny ^{1}	All
M3 Racing	Holden Commodore (VE)	51	(New Zealand) Greg Murphy (New Zealand) Fabian Coulthard (New Zealand) Nick Cassidy	(Australia) Jack Perkins	1, 3–4, 6–7; 2; 5
AV8 Motorsport	Holden Commodore (VE)	22	(New Zealand) Andre Heimgartner (New Zealand) Gene Rollinson	(Australia) Paul Morris (New Zealand) Andy Booth	All; 6
AV8 Motorsport	Holden Commodore (VE)	23	(New Zealand) Andy Booth	(Australia) Tony D'Alberto	All
M2 Racing	Holden Commodore (VE)	26	(New Zealand) Simon McLennan	(New Zealand) Craig Innes (Australia) Cam Waters	5–7
PSR Racing	Ford Falcon (FG)	27	(New Zealand) Craig Baird (Australia) George Miedecke	(New Zealand) Chris Pither	All
Tasman Motorsports Group	Ford Falcon (FG)	31	(New Zealand) Daniel Gaunt	(New Zealand) Andrew Waite	4–7
John McIntyre Racing	Ford Falcon (FG)	47	(New Zealand) John McIntyre	(New Zealand) Jono Lester	All
John McIntyre Racing	Ford Falcon (FG)	556; 70	(New Zealand) Steven Richards	(New Zealand) Will Bamber (New Zealand) Scott Harrison (New Zealand) Dominic Storey	All
Racing Projects	Ford Falcon (FG)	66	(New Zealand) Colin Corkery	(Netherlands) Jeroen Bleekemolen	1–3, 5–7
Eddie Bell Racing	Ford Falcon (FG)	69	(New Zealand) Eddie Bell	(Australia) Luke Youlden (New Zealand) Will Bamber	All
Farmer Racing Services	Holden Commodore (VE)	99	(New Zealand) Kayne Scott	(New Zealand) Simon Evans	All
Angus Fogg Racing	Holden Commodore (VE)	247	(New Zealand) Angus Fogg	(New Zealand) Hugh Gardiner	4–7

Notes:

- ^1 – Scott Harrison was Paul Manuell's co-driver for Round 5 at Taupō, and John Penny was driving with Manuell at Pukekohe and Ruapuna.

== Calendar ==
The 2012 V8SuperTourer season consisted of seven rounds. The final three rounds were run under an endurance format akin to that run in the V8 Supercar series in Australia.

Rounds		Circuit	Date	Pole position	Fastest lap	Winning driver	Winning team
1	1	Hampton Downs Motorsport Park (Hampton Downs, North Waikato)	18 February	(New Zealand) Kayne Scott	(New Zealand) Scott McLaughlin	(New Zealand) Greg Murphy	M3 Racing
1	2	Hampton Downs Motorsport Park (Hampton Downs, North Waikato)	19 February		(New Zealand) Greg Murphy	(New Zealand) Greg Murphy	M3 Racing
1	3	Hampton Downs Motorsport Park (Hampton Downs, North Waikato)	19 February		(New Zealand) Kayne Scott	(New Zealand) Ant Pedersen	International Motorsport
2	4	Powerbuilt Raceway at Ruapuna Park (Christchurch, Canterbury)	7 April	(New Zealand) Fabian Coulthard	(New Zealand) Fabian Coulthard	(New Zealand) Fabian Coulthard	M3 Racing
2	5	Powerbuilt Raceway at Ruapuna Park (Christchurch, Canterbury)	8 April		(New Zealand) Fabian Coulthard	(New Zealand) Fabian Coulthard	M3 Racing
2	6	Powerbuilt Raceway at Ruapuna Park (Christchurch, Canterbury)	8 April		(New Zealand) Fabian Coulthard	(New Zealand) John McIntyre	John McIntyre Racing
3	7	Manfeild Autocourse (Feilding, Manawatū District)	28 April	(New Zealand) Jonny Reid	(New Zealand) John McIntyre	(New Zealand) Jonny Reid	International Motorsport
3	8	Manfeild Autocourse (Feilding, Manawatū District)	29 April		(New Zealand) Jonny Reid	(New Zealand) Jonny Reid	International Motorsport
3	9	Manfeild Autocourse (Feilding, Manawatū District)	29 April		(New Zealand) Andy Booth	(New Zealand) Greg Murphy	M3 Racing
4	10	Hampton Downs Motorsport Park (Hampton Downs, North Waikato)	2 June	(New Zealand) Scott McLaughlin	(New Zealand) Scott McLaughlin	(New Zealand) Scott McLaughlin	MPC Motorsport
4	11	Hampton Downs Motorsport Park (Hampton Downs, North Waikato)	3 June		(New Zealand) Scott McLaughlin	(New Zealand) Scott McLaughlin	MPC Motorsport
4	12	Hampton Downs Motorsport Park (Hampton Downs, North Waikato)	3 June		(New Zealand) Scott McLaughlin	(New Zealand) Scott McLaughlin	MPC Motorsport

Endurance Series

Rounds		Circuit	Date	Pole position	Fastest lap	Winning drivers	Winning team
5	13	Taupo Motorsport Park (Taupō, Taupō District)	2 September	(New Zealand) Nick Cassidy (Australia) Jack Perkins	(New Zealand) Nick Cassidy (Australia) Jack Perkins	(New Zealand) Nick Cassidy (Australia) Jack Perkins	M3 Racing
5	14	Taupo Motorsport Park (Taupō, Taupō District)	2 September		(New Zealand) Jonny Reid (New Zealand) Wade Cunningham	(New Zealand) Scott McLaughlin (Australia) Jonathon Webb	MPC Motorsport
6	15	Pukekohe Park Raceway (Pukekohe, Auckland Region)	28 October	(New Zealand) Greg Murphy (Australia) Jack Perkins	(New Zealand) Scott McLaughlin (Australia) Jonathon Webb	(New Zealand) Scott McLaughlin (Australia) Jonathon Webb	MPC Motorsport
6	16	Pukekohe Park Raceway (Pukekohe, Auckland Region)	28 October		(New Zealand) Scott McLaughlin (Australia) Jonathon Webb	(New Zealand) Greg Murphy (Australia) Jack Perkins	M3 Racing
6	17	Pukekohe Park Raceway (Pukekohe, Auckland Region)	28 October		(New Zealand) Scott McLaughlin (Australia) Jonathon Webb	(New Zealand) Greg Murphy (Australia) Jack Perkins	M3 Racing
7	18	Powerbuilt Raceway at Ruapuna Park (Christchurch, Canterbury)	25 November	(New Zealand) Ant Pedersen (Australia) Alex Davison	(New Zealand) Scott McLaughlin (Australia) Jonathon Webb	(New Zealand) Scott McLaughlin (Australia) Jonathon Webb	MPC Motorsport
7	19	Powerbuilt Raceway at Ruapuna Park (Christchurch, Canterbury)	25 November		(New Zealand) Scott McLaughlin (Australia) Jonathon Webb	(New Zealand) Daniel Gaunt (New Zealand) Andrew Waite	Tasman Motorsports

== Championship standings ==
=== Drivers Championship ===
==== Sprint Championship ====
Pos	Driver	HAM			RUA			MAN			HAM			Pts
Pos	Driver	R1	R2	R3	R1	R2	R3	R1	R2	R3	R1	R2	R3	Pts
1	(New Zealand) John McIntyre	9th	6th	2nd	2nd	4th	1st	2nd	7th	2nd	5th	3rd	8th	2555
2	(New Zealand) Jonny Reid	4th	2nd	9th	3rd	2nd	10th	1st	1st	5th	3rd	Ret	4th	2334
3	(New Zealand) Scott McLaughlin	10th	15th	3rd	Ret	7th	15th				1st	1st	1st	2055
4	(New Zealand) Andy Booth	3rd	4th	11th	7th	8th	4th	Ret	5th	12th	2nd	2nd	2nd	1958
5	(New Zealand) Greg Murphy	1st	1st	7th				3rd	3rd	1st	4th	5th	3rd	1742
6	(New Zealand) Kayne Scott	2nd	3rd	13th	6th	5th	5th	10th	10th	7th	6th	10th	Ret	1695
7	(New Zealand) Ant Pedersen	8th	9th	1st	5th	6th	6th	4th	6th	9th	Ret	14th	6th	1661
8	(New Zealand) Craig Baird	5th	DNF	6th	4th	3rd	3rd	6th	9th	8th	Ret	7th	Ret	1604
9	(New Zealand) Steven Richards	13th	10th	4th	11th	9th	7th	8th	4th	6th	10th	15th	10th	1553
10	(New Zealand) Andre Heimgartner	16th	13th	5th	8th	13th	11th	12th	8th	13th	8th	4th	5th	1461
11	(New Zealand) Andy Knight	6th	7th	8th	12th	Ret	Ret	7th	2nd	10th	9th	6th	7th	1277
12	(New Zealand) Richard Moore	12th	11th	Ret	10th	12th	14th	13th	11th	3rd	Ret	Ret	13th	1220
13	(New Zealand) Paul Manuell	11th	8th	Ret	14th	11th	12th	9th	Ret	4th	7th	12th	9th	1184
14	(New Zealand) Eddie Bell	7th	5th	12th	15th	10th	8th	5th	12th	11th	11th	9th	Ret	1039
15	(Australia) Geoff Emery	15th	12th	10th	9th	14th	9th				12th	11th	12th	639
16	(New Zealand) Fabian Coulthard				1st	1st	2nd							757
17	(New Zealand) Daniel Gaunt										14th	8th	11th	570
18	(New Zealand) Colin Corkery	14th	14th	Ret	13th	Ret	13th	11th	Ret	Ret				439
19	(New Zealand) Angus Fogg										13th	13th	14th	302
20	(New Zealand) Mitch Cunningham													185
21	(New Zealand) Simon McLennan													144
22	(New Zealand) Tim Edgell													124
23	(New Zealand) Gene Rollinson													0
Pos	Driver	Rd 1			Rd 2			Rd 3			Rd 4			Pts

Colour	Result
Gold	Winner
Silver	Second place
Bronze	Third place
Green	Points classification
Blue	Non-points classification
Blue	Non-classified finish (NC)
Purple	Retired, not classified (Ret)
Red	Did not qualify (DNQ)
Red	Did not pre-qualify (DNPQ)
Black	Disqualified (DSQ)
White	Did not start (DNS)
White	Withdrew (WD)
White	Race cancelled (C)
Blank	Did not practice (DNP)
Blank	Did not arrive (DNA)
Blank	Excluded (EX)

==== Endurance Championship ====
Pos.	Drivers	Team	TAU		PUK			RUA		Pts.
Pos.	Drivers	Team	R1	R2	R1	R2	R3	R1	R2	Pts.
1	(New Zealand) Nick Cassidy (Taupō) (New Zealand) Greg Murphy (Pukekohe & Ruapuna) (Australia) Jack Perkins	Mike Pero Racing	1st	2nd	2nd	1st	1st	13th	5th	1852
2	(New Zealand) Scott McLaughlin (Australia) Jonathon Webb	MPC Motorsport	2nd	1st	1st	2nd	2nd	1st	15th	1803
3	(New Zealand) Richard Moore (Australia) Owen Kelly	M3 Racing	4th	4th	4th	4th	3rd	10th	13th	1220
4	(New Zealand) Daniel Gaunt (New Zealand) Andrew Waite	Tasman Motorsports Group	6th	14th	7th	3rd	5th	Ret	1st	1162
5	(New Zealand) Ant Pedersen (New Zealand) Matt Halliday (Taupō & Pukekohe) (Australia) Alex Davison (Ruapuna)	International Motorsport	18th	8th	6th	6th	7th	8th	4th	1068
6	(New Zealand) Craig Baird (Taupō) (Australia) George Miedecke (Pukekohe & Ruapuna) (New Zealand) Chris Pither	PSR Racing	8th	7th	10th	12th	11th	3rd	10th	976
7	(New Zealand) Andre Heimgartner (New Zealand) Gene Rollinson (Pukekohe R2 & R3) (Australia) Paul Morris (New Zealand) Andy Booth (Pukekohe R2 & R3)	AV8 Motorsport	5th	Ret	8th	11th	6th	9th	11th	856
8	(New Zealand) Steven Richards (New Zealand) Will Bamber (Taupō) (New Zealand) Scott Harrison (Pukekohe) (New Zealand) Dominic Storey (Ruapuna)	John McIntyre Racing	7th	9th	14th	Ret	9th	7th	8th	795
9	(New Zealand) Mitch Cunningham (Australia) Dean Canto	International Motorsport	10th	15th	13th	8th	13th	4th	16th	779
10	(New Zealand) Andy Booth (Australia) Tony D'Alberto	AV8 Motorsport	9th	11th	5th	DNS	DNS	2nd	14th	777
11	(New Zealand) John McIntyre (New Zealand) Jono Lester	John McIntyre Racing	3rd	3rd	18th	7th	14th	DNS	DNS	771
12	(Australia) Geoff Emery (Austria) Christian Klien (Taupō) (Australia) Steve Owen (Pukekohe & Ruapuna)	MPC Motorsport	17th	12th	15th	5th	15th	Ret	2nd	755
13	(New Zealand) Kayne Scott (New Zealand) Simon Evans	Farmer Racing Services	Ret	5th	3rd	15th	4th	DNS	DNS	728
14	(New Zealand) Simon McLennan (New Zealand) Craig Innes (Taupō) (Australia) Cam Waters (Pukekohe & Ruapuna)	M2 Motorsport	12th	18th	17th	13th	10th	5th	12th	692
15	(New Zealand) Jonny Reid (New Zealand) Wade Cunningham	International Motorsport	13th	6th	9th	14th	16th	11th	17th	690
16	(New Zealand) Angus Fogg (New Zealand) Hugh Gardiner	Angus Fogg Racing	14th	17th	12th	10th	12th	12th	9th	659
17	(New Zealand) Paul Manuell (New Zealand) Scott Harrison (Taupō) (New Zealand) John Penny (Pukekohe & Ruapuna)	M3 Racing	15th	13th	11th	9th	8th	Ret	6th	608
18	(New Zealand) Tim Edgell (New Zealand) Nick Chester (Taupō) (New Zealand) Chris van der Drift (Pukekohe & Ruapuna)	Edgell Performance Racing	16th	16th	16th	Ret	DNS	Ret	3rd	429
19	(New Zealand) Eddie Bell (Australia) Luke Youlden (Taupō & Ruapuna) (New Zealand) Will Bamber (Pukekohe)	Eddie Bell Racing	Ret	DNS	DNS	DNS	DNS	6th	7th	336
20	(New Zealand) Colin Corkery (Netherlands) Jeroen Bleekemolen	Racing Projects	11th	10th	Ret	DNS	DNS	DNS	DNS	221
Pos.	Drivers	Team	R1	R2	R1	R2	R3	R1	R2	Pts.
Pos.	Drivers	Team	TAU		PUK			RUA		Pts.

Colour	Result
Gold	Winner
Silver	Second place
Bronze	Third place
Green	Points classification
Blue	Non-points classification
Blue	Non-classified finish (NC)
Purple	Retired, not classified (Ret)
Red	Did not qualify (DNQ)
Red	Did not pre-qualify (DNPQ)
Black	Disqualified (DSQ)
White	Did not start (DNS)
White	Withdrew (WD)
White	Race cancelled (C)
Blank	Did not practice (DNP)
Blank	Did not arrive (DNA)
Blank	Excluded (EX)

== See also ==
V8SuperTourer
