= M3 Racing =

- Manufacturer: Holden
- Team Principal: Paul Manuell; Greg Murphy; Graeme Moore
- Race Drivers: 1 Greg Murphy; 10 Richard Moore; 15 Morgan Haber
- Chassis: Holden VE Commodore
- Debut: 2012
- Drivers' Championships: 2 (2013) & (2014)
- Round wins: 8
- Race wins: 27
- Pole positions: 5
- 2014 position: Champion (1155 points)

M3 Racing is a New Zealand motor racing team based in East Tāmaki, Auckland that competes in the V8SuperTourer series.

The team currently runs the #10 Skinny Mobile Holden for Richard Moore, the #15 Orix Holden for Morgan Haber, and the #1 Mike Pero Mortgages Holden for former V8 Supercar driver Greg Murphy.

== History ==
A few years ago Murphy and Manuell began talking about creating a team to compete in New Zealand motorsport, agreeing a team effort would be the way to go. Richard's parents, Graeme and Karen Moore were also keen to see the team set up.

With the announcement that the V8SuperTourer would be debuting in 2012, the team was formed and premises built.

Brothers Kerry & Craig Holland along with Mike Squires provide facilities to the team.

M3 Racing is one of the most successful V8 SuperTourer Teams to date with the team picking up 11 Race Wins in just over a year of racing. The team also has 4 Round Wins and 2 Pole Positions, and also finished runner up in the Championship last year.

== Racing record ==
(Bold indicates championships won.)

Year	Name	Car	No.	Drivers	Points	Pos
2012	M3 Racing	Holden VE Commodore	10; 15; 51	(New Zealand) **Richard Moore** (New Zealand) **Paul Manuell** (New Zealand) **Greg Murphy**	2080; 1645; 3080	8th 13th 2nd
2013	M3 Racing	Holden VE Commodore	10; 15; 51	(New Zealand) **Richard Moore** (New Zealand) **Paul Manuell** (New Zealand) **Greg Murphy**	2878; 1871; 3559	4th 10th 1st
2014	M3 Racing	Holden VE Commodore	1; 10; 15	(New Zealand) **Greg Murphy** (New Zealand) **Richard Moore** (New Zealand) **Morgan Haber**	1155; 821; 537	1st 3rd 9th

* Season still in progress.
