= Richard Moore (racing driver) =

New Zealand racing driver (born 1991)

- Nationality: New Zealander
- Born: 1 December 1991 (age 34)

V8SuperTourer career
- Debut season: 2012
- Car number: 10
- Former teams: M3 Racing
- Starts: 88
- Wins: 5
- Poles: 0
- Fastest laps: 4
- Best finish: 2nd in 2013

Championship titles
- 2009: National Open Champion - KartSport

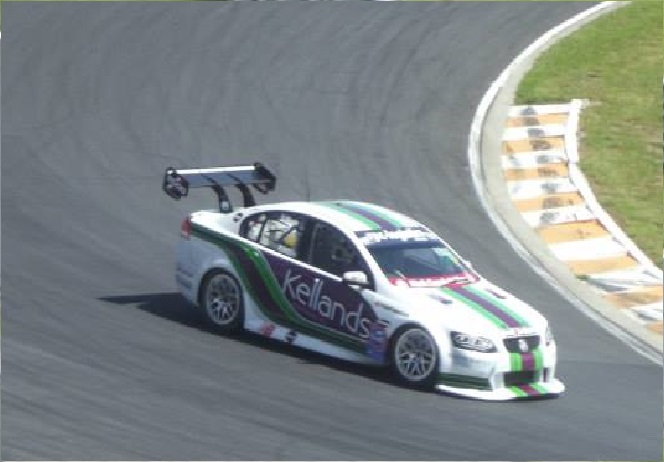
Moore's Holden Commodore which he raced to fourth in the 2013 season.

Richard Moore (born 1 December 1991) is a racing driver from New Zealand, who competes in the New Zealand V8SuperTourer Series for M3 Racing, he is the team mate of four-time Bathurst 1000 winner Greg Murphy.

== Career ==
=== V8 SuperTourers ===
In 2012, the all new V8SuperTourer category was launched, and the Moore family was interested in competing and managed to form a team with Paul Manuell and Greg Murphy to create M3 Racing. In Moore's first season, he showed great speed and even managed to land four podium finishes, and then in 2013, Moore was consistently in the top three placings, and ended the season fourth in the championship, including a race victory.

== Racing record ==
=== Career summary ===
Season	Series	Team	Races	Wins	Poles	F/Laps	Podiums	Points	Position
2012	V8SuperTourer	M3 Racing	19	0	0	0	2	2080	8th
2013	V8SuperTourer	M3 Racing	21	1	0	1	8	2878	4th
