= 2008–09 New Zealand V8 season =

2008–09 New Zealand V8s season

Seasons
- ← 2007–08 2009–10 →

The 2008–09 New Zealand V8 season (known for commercial reasons as the 2008–09 BNT NZV8s Championship) was a motor racing series for New Zealand V8 touring cars. It was the thirteenth iteration of the championship. The series began at Taupo Motorsport Park on October 3 in 2008 and concluded at the Pukekohe Park Raceway on April 19 in 2009. There was also a non-championship round held on the Hamilton Street Circuit as part of the support package for the Hamilton 400.

Kayne Scott overturned a 38-point deficit heading into the final round at Pukekohe Park Raceway, to finish as champion; winning the title by nine points ahead of John McIntyre.

== Race calendar ==
Rnd	Circuit	Date	Map
2008			2008–09 New Zealand V8 season is located in New Zealand
1	Taupo Motorsport Park (Taupō, Waikato)	3–5 October	2008–09 New Zealand V8 season is located in New Zealand
2	Pukekohe Park Raceway (Pukekohe, Auckland Region)	7–9 November	2008–09 New Zealand V8 season is located in New Zealand
3	Powerbuilt Raceway at Ruapuna Park (Christchurch, Canterbury Region)	28–30 November	2008–09 New Zealand V8 season is located in New Zealand
2009			2008–09 New Zealand V8 season is located in New Zealand
4	Timaru International Motor Raceway (Timaru, Canterbury Region)	9–11 January	2008–09 New Zealand V8 season is located in New Zealand
5	Teretonga Park (Invercargill, Southland Region)	16–18 February	2008–09 New Zealand V8 season is located in New Zealand
6	Manfeild Autocourse (Feilding, Manawatū District)	27 February–1 March	2008–09 New Zealand V8 season is located in New Zealand
7	Pukekohe Park Raceway (Pukekohe, Auckland Region)	13–15 March	2008–09 New Zealand V8 season is located in New Zealand
NC	Hamilton Street Circuit (Hamilton, Waikato)	17–19 April	2008–09 New Zealand V8 season is located in New Zealand

== Teams and drivers ==
The following teams and drivers are competing in the current series.

Manufacturer	Vehicle	Team	No.	Driver	Rounds
Ford	Ford Falcon (BF)	John McIntyre Racing	1	(New Zealand) John McIntyre	All
Ford	Ford Falcon (BF)	Richards Team Motorsport	4	(New Zealand) Simon Richards	All
Ford	Ford Falcon (BF)	Richards Team Motorsport	82	(New Zealand) Michael Bristow	All
Ford	Ford Falcon (BF)	Autotek	9	(New Zealand) Andy Knight	All
Ford	Ford Falcon (BF)	Autotek	9	(Australia) Luke Youlden	4, 6–7
Ford	Ford Falcon (BF)	Tulloch Motorsport	12	(New Zealand) Inky Tulloch	All
Ford	Ford Falcon (BF)	Ezybuy Racing	21	(New Zealand) Alan McCarrison	1–4, 6
Ford	Ford Falcon (BF)	Edgell Performance Racing	26	(New Zealand) Tim Edgell	1, 3–7
Ford	Ford Falcon (BF)	Pedersen Sheehan Racing	27	(New Zealand) Craig Baird	All
Ford	Ford Falcon (BF)	Porter Brothers Racing	69	(New Zealand) Eddie Bell	All
Ford	Ford Falcon (BF)	Porter Brothers Racing	111	(New Zealand) Andrew Porter	1–3, 5–7
Ford	Ford Falcon (BF)	Boyd Norwood	88	(New Zealand) Boyd Norwood	1–3
Ford	Ford Falcon (BF)	International Motorsport	96	(New Zealand) Paul Pedersen	1–6
Ford	Ford Falcon (BF)	Mark Petch Motorsport	99	(New Zealand) Kayne Scott	All
Ford	Ford Falcon (BF)	HPM Racing	777	(New Zealand) Paul Radisich	1
Ford	Ford Falcon (BF)	HPM Racing	777	(Australia) Steve Owen	2–3
Ford	Ford Falcon (BA)	Angus Fogg Racing	2	(New Zealand) Angus Fogg	All
Ford	Ford Falcon (BA)	SCG Racing	22	(New Zealand) Dale Williams	All
Ford	Ford Falcon (BA)	SCG Racing	48	(Australia) David Besnard	1
Ford	Ford Falcon (BA)	SCG Racing	48	(New Zealand) Mack Peach	4–5
Ford	Ford Falcon (BA)	Versatile Buildings	41	(New Zealand) Adam Brook	All
Holden	Holden Commodore (VZ)	Dave Stewart Racing	5	(New Zealand) Dave Stewart	3, 6
Holden	Holden Commodore (VZ)	Concept Motorsport	007	(New Zealand) Nick Ross	All
Holden	Holden Commodore (VZ)	Hardy Racing	8	(New Zealand) Cam Hardy	1–2
Holden	Holden Commodore (VZ)	Paul Manuell Racing	15	(New Zealand) Paul Manuell	All
Holden	Holden Commodore (VZ)	AV8 Motorsport	23	(New Zealand) Andy Booth	All
Holden	Holden Commodore (VZ)	Penny Homes Racing	49	(New Zealand) John Penny	All
Holden	Holden Commodore (VZ)	Huzliff Motors	50	(New Zealand) Julia Huzliff	1
Holden	Holden Commodore (VZ)	Adams Motorsport	51	(New Zealand) Chris Adams	1–3, 5
Holden	Holden Commodore (VZ)	John Hepburn Racing	52	(New Zealand) John Hepburn	All
Holden	Holden Commodore (VZ)	ITM Racing	70	(New Zealand) Andrew Anderson	All
Holden	Holden Commodore (VY)	PW Racing	90	(New Zealand) Shaun Turton	1

== Results and standings ==
=== Points structure ===
Each championship round consists of three races, one on Saturday afternoon, one on Sunday morning and a final reverse grid race on Sunday afternoon. Points for the 2008/2009 championship are allocated as follows:

Position	1st	2nd	3rd	4th	5th	6th	7th	8th	9th	10th	11th	12th	13th	14th	15th	16th	17th	18th	19th	20th	21st	22nd	23rd	24th	25th	26th	27th	28th	29th	30th
Points	75	67	60	54	49	45	42	39	36	33	30	28	26	24	22	20	18	16	14	12	10	9	8	7	6	5	4	3	2	1

=== Championship standings ===
Pos	Driver	TAU			PUK1			RUA			TIM			TER			MAN			PUK2			HAM			Pts
Pos	Driver	R1	R2	R3	R1	R2	R3	R1	R2	R3	R1	R2	R3	R1	R2	R3	R1	R2	R3	R1	R2	R3	R1	R2	R3	Pts
1	(New Zealand) Kayne Scott	1	5	4	12	6	1	2	2	2	1	1	9	13	11	4	5	2	8	3	3	1	1	1	1	1179
2	(New Zealand) John McIntyre	5	2	6	2	1	7	5	1	3	3	3	8	DSQ	7	2	1	1	1	5	4	6	13	3	4	1170
3	(New Zealand) Craig Baird	7	4	Ret	Ret	11	2	3	12	1	4	4	4	2	1	12	3	3	6	1	1	7	Ret	7	Ret	1048
4	(New Zealand) Andy Booth	3	3	7	19	12	16	4	3	5	7	5	14	1	2	10	2	4	Ret	2	2	15	Ret	16	7	983
5	(New Zealand) Paul Manuell	21	15	13	1	2	8	21	14	4	14	13	3	3	6	8	4	5	4	9	8	Ret	Ret	9	9	816
6	(New Zealand) Angus Fogg	23	8	1	Ret	Ret	19	1	4	8	2	2	15	Ret	10	1	18	Ret	2	15	6	2	2	12	2	791
7	(New Zealand) Eddie Bell	10	Ret	3	7	7	21	7	8	9	8	7	12	8	18	15	8	10	11	8	7	16				709
8	(New Zealand) Andrew Anderson	4	9	Ret	4	4	12	15	24	14	6	9	10	Ret	15	3	Ret	13	5	7	5	9	6	6	5	694
9	(New Zealand) Adam Brook	18	11	20	13	10	16	10	7	11	10	10	13	5	14	11	6	17	3	12	18	11	9	Ret	11	647
10	(New Zealand) Tim Edgell	Ret	19	11	Ret	Ret	Wth	8	5	10	5	6	5	15	5	9	21	9	9	4	19	4	5	2	3	631
11	(New Zealand) Michael Bristow	9	7	9	11	9	9	22	15	13	11	8	16	Ret	9	5	7	12	10	19	10	Ret	7	Ret	8	607
12	(New Zealand) Paul Pederson	25	12	2	6	5	11	9	6	18	23	21	2	4	4	13	14	20	Ret							590
13	(New Zealand) John Penny	12	13	12	23	16	5	16	11	15	13	14	11	10	12	7	10	16	21	16	14	12	17	10	12	561
14	(New Zealand) Dale Williams	13	6	21	8	8	15	11	9	6	9	11	Ret	Ret	16	14	15	Ret	7	14	12	Ret				528
15	(New Zealand) Andrew Porter	6	10	22	Ret	13	3	Ret	10	17	Ret	Ret	DNS	6	19	20	9	8	13	17	15	3	3	4	14	505
16	(New Zealand) Nick Ross	Ret	Ret	10	15	20	20	20	16	7	20	15	6	9	17	6	13	Ret	15	11	Ret	8	8	17	Ret	461
17	(New Zealand) Inky Tulloch	24	14	15	16	15	Ret	23	19	16	15	DNS	7	7	3	16	17	21	12	18	17	14	11	Ret	15	449
18	(New Zealand) Simon Richards	11	20	16	14	14	13	12	13	25	21	17	Ret	17	13	19	16	14	18	Ret	16	10	14	8	Ret	405
19	(New Zealand) Andy Knight	Ret	21	23	9	17	Wth	6	Ret	12	12	12	Ret	DNS	20	18				Ret	13	5	12	11	16	358
20	(New Zealand) John Hepburn	15	Ret	DNS	18	18	10	13	17	19	18	16	19	16	Ret	Ret	20	18	17	13	Ret	13	10	15	10	323
21	(Australia) Luke Youlden										17	22	1				12	7	14	10	9	18				291
22	(New Zealand) Alan McCarrison	14	23	14	17	Ret	17	14	23	22	19	18	20				22	19	Ret							197
22	(New Zealand) Chris Adams	20	17	18	22	19	DSQ	18	21	23	Ret	Wth	Wth	11	8	17										197
24	(New Zealand) Paul Radisich	2	1	8																						181
25	(Australia) Steve Owen				5	Ret	4	19	21	20																144
26	(New Zealand) Boyd Norwood	16	18	17	21	21	18	DNS	22	24																114
27	(New Zealand) Dave Stewart				20	DSQ	Wth	17	18	21							19	15	16							104
28	(Australia) David Besnard	8	Ret	5																						88
29	(New Zealand) Mack Peach										16	20	17	14	Ret	Ret										74
30	(New Zealand) David Hopper										22	19	18	12	DNS	Ret										67
31	(New Zealand) Cam Hardy	22	22	Ret	10	Ret	Wth																15	13	Ret	54
32	(New Zealand) Julia Huzziff	19	16	19																						48
33	(New Zealand) Shaun Turton	17	Ret	Ret	DNS	Wth	Wth																			18
Drivers ineligible for championship points
-	(New Zealand) Dean Perkins				3	3	14										11	6	20	6	11	17	4	5	6	0
-	(New Zealand) Shannon Coker																						16	14	13	0
Pos	Driver	R1	R2	R3	R1	R2	R3	R1	R2	R3	R1	R2	R3	R1	R2	R3	R1	R2	R3	R1	R2	R3	R1	R2	R3	Pts
Pos	Driver	TAU			PUK1			RUA			TIM			TER			MAN			PUK2			HAM			Pts
