= 2009–10 New Zealand V8 season =

2009–10 New Zealand V8s season

Seasons
- ← 2008–09 2010–11 →

The 2009–10 New Zealand V8 season was the eleventh season of the series, under the NZV8 guise. The season began at Pukekohe on 8 November 2009 and finished at the Hamilton Street Circuit on 18 April 2010 after six championship meetings, and a season-ending non-championship event.

== Race calendar ==
Rnd	Circuit	Date	Map
2009			2009–10 New Zealand V8 season is located in New Zealand
1	Pukekohe Park Raceway (Pukekohe, Auckland Region)	6–8 November	2009–10 New Zealand V8 season is located in New Zealand
2	Powerbuilt Raceway at Ruapuna Park (Christchurch, Canterbury Region)	27–29 November	2009–10 New Zealand V8 season is located in New Zealand
2010			2009–10 New Zealand V8 season is located in New Zealand
3	Teretonga Park (Invercargill, Southland Region)	15–17 January	2009–10 New Zealand V8 season is located in New Zealand
4	Timaru International Motor Raceway (Timaru, Canterbury Region)	22–24 January	2009–10 New Zealand V8 season is located in New Zealand
5	Manfeild Autocourse (Feilding, Manawatū District)	12–14 February	2009–10 New Zealand V8 season is located in New Zealand
6	Taupo Motorsport Park (Taupō, Waikato)	19–21 March	2009–10 New Zealand V8 season is located in New Zealand
NC	Hamilton Street Circuit (Hamilton, Waikato)	16–18 April	2009–10 New Zealand V8 season is located in New Zealand

== Teams and drivers ==
- All teams must adhere to the series' car specification rules. All Holdens must be based upon the body shells of its VT, VX or VY Commodores, with upgrades available to replicate it to a VZ or VE. Similarly for Ford, their cars must be based upon the AU Falcon, with options to replicate the BA.

Manufacturer	Vehicle	Team	No.	Driver	Rounds
Ford	Falcon (BF)	Mark Petch Motorsport	1	(New Zealand) Kayne Scott	All
Ford	Falcon (BF)	Pedersen Sheehan Racing	3	(New Zealand) Craig Baird	All
Ford	Falcon (BF)	Ballistic Motorsport	4	(New Zealand) Simon Richards	All
Ford	Falcon (BF)	Angus Fogg Racing	6	(New Zealand) Angus Fogg	All
Ford	Falcon (BF)	Kevin Williams Racing	8	(New Zealand) Kevin Williams	6
Ford	Falcon (BF)	Tulloch Motorsport	12	(New Zealand) Darryn Henderson	All
Ford	Falcon (BF)	Paul Manuell Racing	15	(New Zealand) Paul Manuell	6
Ford	Falcon (BF)	Albany Toyota NZV8	20	(New Zealand) Haydn Mackenzie	All
Ford	Falcon (BF)	Ezybuy Racing	21	(New Zealand) Alan McCarrison	1, 5
Ford	Falcon (BF)	Ezybuy Racing	21	(New Zealand) Michael Bristow	6
Ford	Falcon (BF)	Dale Williams Racing	25	(New Zealand) Dale Williams	All
Ford	Falcon (BF)	Edgell Performance Racing	26	(New Zealand) Tim Edgell	All
Ford	Falcon (BF)	Matt Lockwood Motorsports	36	(New Zealand) Matt Lockwood	1, 5–6
Ford	Falcon (BF)	Versatile Buildings	41	(New Zealand) Adam Brook	2
Ford	Falcon (BF)	John McIntyre Racing	47	(New Zealand) John McIntyre	All
Ford	Falcon (BF)	SCG Racing	48	(Australia) David Besnard	1–2
Ford	Falcon (BF)	SCG Racing	48	(New Zealand) Ant Pedersen	6
Ford	Falcon (BF)	Metalman NZ V8 Race Team	57	(New Zealand) Clark Proctor	All
Ford	Falcon (BF)	Eddie Bell Racing	69	(New Zealand) Eddie Bell	All
Ford	Falcon (BF)	Chris Pither Racing	77	(New Zealand) Chris Pither	4–5
Ford	Falcon (BF)	Whelan Motorsport	89	(New Zealand) John Whelan	All
Ford	Falcon (BF)	Knight Motorsport	97	(New Zealand) Andy Knight	All
Holden	Commodore (VZ)	Dave Stewart Racing	5	(New Zealand) Dave Stewart	1–2, 6
Holden	Commodore (VZ)	Concept Motorsport	007	(New Zealand) Nick Ross	All
Holden	Commodore (VZ)	Concept Motorsport	55	(New Zealand) Christina Orr	All
Holden	Commodore (VZ)	Paul Manuell Racing	15	(New Zealand) Paul Manuell	1–5
Holden	Commodore (VZ)	Penny Homes Racing	22	(New Zealand) John Penny	All
Holden	Commodore (VZ)	AV8 Motorsport	23	(New Zealand) Andy Booth	All
Holden	Commodore (VZ)	Shannon Coker	50	(New Zealand) Shannon Coker	5–6
Holden	Commodore (VZ)	John Hepburn Racing	52	(New Zealand) John Hepburn	All
Holden	Commodore (VZ)	ITM Racing	70	(New Zealand) Andrew Anderson	All
Holden	Commodore (VY)	Penny Homes Racing	33	(New Zealand) David Hopper	All

== Results and standings ==
=== Season summary ===
Round		Circuit	Winning driver	Winning team
1	R1	Pukekohe Park Raceway	(New Zealand) John McIntyre	John McIntyre Racing
1	R2	Pukekohe Park Raceway	(New Zealand) Eddie Bell	Eddie Bell Racing
1	R3	Pukekohe Park Raceway	(New Zealand) Angus Fogg	Angus Fogg Racing
2	R1	Powerbuilt Raceway at Ruapuna Park	(New Zealand) John McIntyre	John McIntyre Racing
2	R2	Powerbuilt Raceway at Ruapuna Park	(New Zealand) John McIntyre	John McIntyre Racing
2	R3	Powerbuilt Raceway at Ruapuna Park	(New Zealand) Paul Manuell	Paul Manuell Racing
3	R1	Teretonga Park	(New Zealand) John McIntyre	John McIntyre Racing
3	R2	Teretonga Park	(New Zealand) John McIntyre	John McIntyre Racing
3	R3	Teretonga Park	(New Zealand) Paul Manuell	Paul Manuell Racing
4	R1	Timaru International Motor Raceway	(New Zealand) Craig Baird	Pedersen Sheehan Racing
4	R2	Timaru International Motor Raceway	(New Zealand) Craig Baird	Pedersen Sheehan Racing
4	R3	Timaru International Motor Raceway	(New Zealand) Clark Proctor	Metalman Motorsport
5	R1	Manfeild Autocourse	(New Zealand) Tim Edgell	Edgell Performance Racing
5	R2	Manfeild Autocourse	(New Zealand) Craig Baird	Pedersen Sheehan Racing
5	R3	Manfeild Autocourse	(New Zealand) Angus Fogg	Angus Fogg Racing
6	R1	Taupo Motorsport Park	(New Zealand) John McIntyre	John McIntyre Racing
6	R2	Taupo Motorsport Park	(New Zealand) John McIntyre	John McIntyre Racing
6	R3	Taupo Motorsport Park	(New Zealand) Craig Baird	Pedersen Sheehan Racing
NC	R1	Hamilton Street Circuit	(New Zealand) John McIntyre	John McIntyre Racing
NC	R2	Hamilton Street Circuit	(New Zealand) John McIntyre	John McIntyre Racing
NC	R3	Hamilton Street Circuit	(New Zealand) John McIntyre	John McIntyre Racing

- The non-championship round was a support race to V8 Supercars at the Hamilton 400.

=== Championship standings ===
Pos	Driver	PUK			RUA			TER			TIM			MAN			TAU			Pts
Pos	Driver	R1	R2	R3	R1	R2	R3	R1	R2	R3	R1	R2	R3	R1	R2	R3	R1	R2	R3	Pts
1	(New Zealand) Craig Baird	4	24	3	2	2	4	2	2	8	1	1	9	3	1	5	3	4	1	1041
2	(New Zealand) John McIntyre	1	9	2	1	1	8	1	1	9	Ret	Ret	Ret	4	3	4	1	1	6	916
3	(New Zealand) Kayne Scott	6	4	12	8	3	9	7	7	3	13	9	6	2	4	7	2	2	4	864
4	(New Zealand) Tim Edgell	5	3	16	4	5	15	3	4	Ret	2	2	15	1	2	8	4	3	9	855
5	(New Zealand) Andy Booth	3	2	10	5	4	Ret	8	9	6	15	10	3	6	6	12	5	5	3	774
6	(New Zealand) Eddie Bell	2	1	6	7	7	12	6	5	Ret	3	3	7	8	Ret	2	16	10	Ret	714
7	(New Zealand) Andy Knight	9	6	9	3	6	17	5	6	14	7	16	5	5	5	6	6	8	19	710
8	(New Zealand) Angus Fogg	10	5	1	16	9	20	4	3	7	14	8	Ret	Ret	21	1	14	Ret	5	602
9	(New Zealand) John Penny	22	23	5	15	15	2	11	10	13	6	15	12	7	7	15	8	6	10	581
10	(New Zealand) Andrew Anderson	16	10	18	9	10	7	9	8	16	12	11	2	22	8	9	9	Ret	16	540
11	(New Zealand) Clark Proctor	8	8	21	6	8	6	15	14	17	19	21	1	10	9	11	11	11	DNS	539
12	(New Zealand) Paul Manuell	Ret	22	4	Ret	13	1	18	16	1	20	6	Ret	15	12	16	7	9	8	519
13	(New Zealand) Haydn Mackenzie	14	13	14	12	21	3	17	17	4	9	12	8	9	10	17	13	Ret	12	506
14	(New Zealand) Simon Richards	7	7	13	13	11	11	10	11	10	10	19	Ret	12	15	10	17	15	18	478
15	(New Zealand) Dale Williams	11	12	22	14	22	16	14	13	11	4	4	11	21	22	22	DNS	19	11	410
15	(New Zealand) Darryn Henderson	15	14	7	11	12	14	19	20	5	8	18	17	13	14	14	19	NC	Ret	410
17	(New Zealand) Nick Ross	13	11	11	23	DNS	Ret	16	15	2	11	7	13	11	11	DNS	18	12	Ret	405
18	(New Zealand) John Hepburn	17	15	20	10	17	21	13	12	15	5	5	Ret	17	13	23	22	Ret	Ret	348
19	(New Zealand) John Whelan	19	16	15	18	14	10	12	Ret	18	21	13	10	DNS	DNS	DNS	10	14	Ret	299
20	(New Zealand) David Hopper	20	20	17	21	18	13	21	20	19	16	20	14	19	19	21	21	18	17	264
21	(New Zealand) Matt Lockwood	Ret	17	8										14	17	3	24	Ret	2	233
22	(New Zealand) Christina Orr	21	21	24	20	Ret	DNS	20	19	12	18	17	16	18	Ret	19	Ret	16	15	219
23	(New Zealand) Chris Pither										17	14	4	16	16	13				162
24	(Australia) David Besnard	12	18	17	19	20	5													137
25	(New Zealand) Ant Pedersen																12	7	7	112
26	(New Zealand) Shannon Coker													20	20	20	23	17	13	88
27	(New Zealand) Dave Stewart	Ret	19	23	22	16	18										20	Ret	Ret	79
28	(New Zealand) Kevin Williams																16	13	14	70
29	(New Zealand) Alan McCarrison	18	Ret	Ret										Ret	18	18				48
30	(New Zealand) Adam Brook				17	19	19													46
	(New Zealand) Michael Bristow																DNS	DNS	DNS	0
Pos	Driver	R1	R2	R3	R1	R2	R3	R1	R2	R3	R1	R2	R3	R1	R2	R3	R1	R2	R3	Pts
Pos	Driver	PUK			RUA			TER			TIM			MAN			TAU			Pts

Colour	Result
Gold	Winner
Silver	Second place
Bronze	Third place
Green	Points classification
Blue	Non-points classification
Blue	Non-classified finish (NC)
Purple	Retired, not classified (Ret)
Red	Did not qualify (DNQ)
Red	Did not pre-qualify (DNPQ)
Black	Disqualified (DSQ)
White	Did not start (DNS)
White	Withdrew (WD)
White	Race cancelled (C)
Blank	Did not practice (DNP)
Blank	Did not arrive (DNA)
Blank	Excluded (EX)
