= 2007–08 New Zealand V8 season =

The 2007–08 New Zealand V8 season (known for commercial reasons as the 2007–08 New Zealand TRUTH V8s Championship) was a motor racing series for New Zealand V8 touring cars. It began at Pukekohe Park Raceway on November 3 in 2007 and concluded at Teretonga Park on March 9 in 2008. There was also an additional non-championship round on the Hamilton Street Circuit as part of the Hamilton 400 support bill.

The championship was won by John McIntyre for the second successive year.

== Calendar ==
Rnd	Circuit	Date	Map
2007			2007–08 New Zealand V8 season is located in New Zealand
1	Pukekohe Park Raceway (Pukekohe, Auckland Region)	3–4 November	2007–08 New Zealand V8 season is located in New Zealand
2	Powerbuilt Raceway at Ruapuna Park (Christchurch, Canterbury Region)	24–25 November	2007–08 New Zealand V8 season is located in New Zealand
2008			2007–08 New Zealand V8 season is located in New Zealand
3	Taupo Motorsport Park (Taupō, Waikato)	19–20 January	2007–08 New Zealand V8 season is located in New Zealand
4	Manfeild Autocourse (Feilding, Manawatū District)	16–17 February	2007–08 New Zealand V8 season is located in New Zealand
5	Timaru International Motor Raceway (Timaru, Canterbury Region)	1–2 March	2007–08 New Zealand V8 season is located in New Zealand
6	Teretonga Park (Invercargill, Southland Region)	8–9 March	2007–08 New Zealand V8 season is located in New Zealand
NC	Hamilton Street Circuit (Hamilton, Waikato)	19–20 April	2007–08 New Zealand V8 season is located in New Zealand

== Teams and drivers ==
Manufacturer	Vehicle	Team	No.	Driver	Rounds
Ford	Falcon (BA)	John McIntyre Racing	1	(New Zealand) John McIntyre	All
Ford	Falcon (BA)	Tulloch Motorsport	2	(New Zealand) Inky Tulloch	All
Ford	Falcon (BA)	International Motorsport	3	(New Zealand) Angus Fogg	All
Ford	Falcon (BA)	International Motorsport	94	(New Zealand) Connel McLaren	All
Ford	Falcon (BA)	International Motorsport	96	(New Zealand) Paul Pedersen	3, NC
Ford	Falcon (BA)	Edgell Performance Racing	8	(New Zealand) Tim Edgell	All
Ford	Falcon (BA)	Powerbuilt Racing Team	9	(Australia) Luke Youlden	All
Ford	Falcon (BA)	Collins Group Motorsport	10	(New Zealand) Andrew Fawcet	All
Ford	Falcon (BA)	Haydn Mackenzie Motorsport	20	(New Zealand) Haydn Mackenzie	All
Ford	Falcon (BA)	Pedersen Sheehan Racing	27	(New Zealand) Mark Pedersen	All
Ford	Falcon (BA)	Tony Richards Motorsport	4	(New Zealand) Simon Richards	All
Ford	Falcon (BA)	Tony Richards Motorsport	40	(Australia) Cameron McLean	1–4
Ford	Falcon (BA)	Tony Richards Motorsport	82	(New Zealand) Michael Bristow	5–6, NC
Ford	Falcon (BA)	Versatile Homes	41	(New Zealand) Adam Brook	All
Ford	Falcon (BA)	Team SCG Racing	48	(Australia) David Besnard	All
Ford	Falcon (BA)	Penny Homes Racing	49	(New Zealand) John Penny	All
Ford	Falcon (BA)	STA Racing	57	(New Zealand) Clark Proctor	All
Ford	Falcon (BA)	GT Radial Racing	75	(New Zealand) Dean Perkins	All
Ford	Falcon (BA)		89	(New Zealand) Dale Lambert	1–4
Ford	Falcon (BA)	Mark Petch Motorsport	99	(New Zealand) Kayne Scott	All
Ford	Falcon (BA)	Porters Brothers Racing	111	(New Zealand) Andrew Porter	All
Ford	Falcon (BA)	Tracer Motorsport	777	(New Zealand) Paul Radisich	All
Holden	Commodore (VZ)	Meguiars Car Care	5	(New Zealand) Darryn Henderson	1–2
Holden	Commodore (VZ)	Meguiars Car Care	5	(Australia) Jack Perkins	NC
Holden	Commodore (VZ)	Nick Ross Racing	007	(New Zealand) Nick Ross	All
Holden	Commodore (VZ)	G&M Autospares	8	(New Zealand) Cam Hardy	All
Holden	Commodore (VZ)	Strapping Systems NZ	25	(New Zealand) Kevin Williams	1–5, NC
Holden	Commodore (VY)	Kitchens 4 Less / Yunca	12	(New Zealand) Michael Wallace	All
Holden	Commodore (VY)	Orix Racing	15	(New Zealand) Paul Manuell	All
Holden	Commodore (VY)	AV8 Motorsport	23	(New Zealand) Andy Booth	All
Holden	Commodore (VY)	Huzziff Motors	50	(New Zealand) Julia Huzziff	1, 3–6
Holden	Commodore (VY)	Mastertrade / Buteline	51	(New Zealand) Chris Adams	All
Holden	Commodore (VY)	Bartercard	69	(New Zealand) Eddie Bell	1–3
Holden	Commodore (VY)	Bartercard	69	(New Zealand) Gene Rollinson	4
Holden	Commodore (VY)	Bartercard	69	(New Zealand) John Hepburn	6, NC
Holden	Commodore (VY)	Pinepac Racing	70	(New Zealand) Andrew Anderson	All
Holden	Commodore (VY)	PW Cars / Classic Autobody	90	(New Zealand) Shaun Turton	3–4, 6, NC
Holden	Commodore (VY)		778	(New Zealand) Dave Stewart	1–4

== Results and standings ==
=== Season summary ===
Round		Venue	Pole position	Fastest lap	Winning driver	Winning team
1	R1	Pukekohe Park Raceway	(New Zealand) John McIntyre		(New Zealand) John McIntyre	John McIntyre Racing
1	R2	Pukekohe Park Raceway			(New Zealand) John McIntyre	John McIntyre Racing
1	R3	Pukekohe Park Raceway			(New Zealand) Adam Brook	Versatile Homes
2	R1	Powerbuilt Raceway at Ruapuna Park	(New Zealand) Paul Radisich		(New Zealand) Paul Radisich	Tracer Motorsport
2	R2	Powerbuilt Raceway at Ruapuna Park			(New Zealand) Paul Radisich	Tracer Motorsport
2	R3	Powerbuilt Raceway at Ruapuna Park			(New Zealand) John McIntyre	John McIntyre Racing
3	R1	Taupo Motorsport Park	(New Zealand) Andy Booth		(New Zealand) John McIntyre	John McIntyre Racing
3	R2	Taupo Motorsport Park			(New Zealand) John McIntyre	John McIntyre Racing
3	R3	Taupo Motorsport Park			(New Zealand) Paul Pedersen	International Motorsport
4	R1	Manfeild Autocourse	(New Zealand) Angus Fogg		(New Zealand) Angus Fogg	International Motorsport
4	R2	Manfeild Autocourse			(New Zealand) Angus Fogg	International Motorsport
4	R3	Manfeild Autocourse			(Australia) David Besnard	Team SCG Racing
5	R1	Timaru International Motor Raceway	(New Zealand) Andy Booth		(New Zealand) Andy Booth	AV8 Motorsport
5	R2	Timaru International Motor Raceway			(New Zealand) John McIntyre	John McIntyre Racing
5	R3	Timaru International Motor Raceway			(New Zealand) Paul Manuell	Orix Racing
6	R1	Teretonga Park			(New Zealand) Kayne Scott	Mark Petch Motorsport
6	R2	Teretonga Park			(New Zealand) Kayne Scott	Mark Petch Motorsport
6	R3	Teretonga Park			(New Zealand) John McIntyre	John McIntyre Racing
NC	R1	Hamilton Street Circuit	(New Zealand) John McIntyre	(Australia) David Besnard	(New Zealand) John McIntyre	John McIntyre Racing
NC	R2	Hamilton Street Circuit		(Australia) David Besnard	(New Zealand) John McIntyre	John McIntyre Racing
NC	R3	Hamilton Street Circuit		(New Zealand) John McIntyre	(New Zealand) John McIntyre	John McIntyre Racing

=== Championship standings ===
Pos	Driver	PUK			RUA			TAU			MAN			TIM			TER			HAM			Pts
Pos	Driver	R1	R2	R3	R1	R2	R3	R1	R2	R3	R1	R2	R3	R1	R2	R3	R1	R2	R3	R1	R2	R3	Pts
1	(New Zealand) John McIntyre	1	1	4	4	5	1	1	1	7	4	2	7	2	1	13	Ret	14	1	1	1	1	1004
2	(New Zealand) Angus Fogg	3	4	5	3	3	6	4	2	16	1	1	8	4	4	14	3	2	3	20	2	9	977
3	(New Zealand) Kayne Scott	5	3	8	2	2	5	2	7	14	2	4	9	6	Ret	2	1	1	5	7	4	3	932
4	(New Zealand) Andy Booth	2	2	6	11	10	Ret	5	14	3	6	6	15	1	2	15	2	4	4	4	Ret	21	809
5	(New Zealand) Paul Radisich	4	6	21	1	1	3	3	3	21	28	27	2	3	3	10	11	6	Ret	2	5	2	748
6	(New Zealand) Paul Manuell	6	7	7	7	4	4	7	4	Ret	3	3	19	24	Ret	1	4	Ret	12	8	6	15	735
7	(New Zealand) Clark Proctor	9	26	14	10	7	9	10	6	8	5	14	4	10	8	9	5	10	22	6	3	DSQ	653
8	(New Zealand) Dean Perkins	8	9	3	9	9	Ret	9	Ret	4	9	5	11	Ret	17	4	7	9	8	9	7	8	598
9	(Australia) David Besnard	24	5	Ret	6	8	Ret	Ret	8	23	7	Ret	1	5	5	5	8	26	11	3	17	Ret	525
10	(Australia) Luke Youlden	7	17	10	27	14	13	21	11	6	17	7	21	11	22	8	9	DSQ	10	5	13	6	449
11	(New Zealand) Mark Pedersen	Ret	13	Ret	8	Ret	Ret	8	9	11	16	16	3	17	19	Ret	6	5	24	Ret	Ret	5	401
12	(New Zealand) Andrew Anderson	10	Ret	DNS	15	15	Ret	13	Ret	Ret	18	10	6	8	6	16	10	8	13	16	8	Ret	399
13	(Australia) Cameron McLean	23	8	2	5	6	15	11	12	5	25	8	17										399
14	(New Zealand) Michael Wallace	11	16	19	12	11	19	15	13	Ret	Ret	18	14	12	10	17	14	12	6	18	15	10	398
15	(New Zealand) Tim Edgell	12	Ret	13	DSQ	Ret	DNS	20	10	15	19	9	12	7	7	23	DNS	13	2	25	10	Ret	383
16	(New Zealand) Andrew Porter	Ret	19	20	21	24	20	14	16	10	27	Ret	5	15	9	6	Ret	17	9	24	Ret	Ret	340
17	(New Zealand) Cam Hardy	17	14	9	16	Ret	10	Ret	22	9	14	15	13	25	25	7	23	19	23	10	14	7	330
18	(New Zealand) Haydn Mackenzie	19	11	16	18	13	11	19	Ret	Ret	12	17	22	13	15	20	18	16	15				322
19	(New Zealand) Simon Richards	18	12	12	24	17	8	18	Ret	19	15	13	20	20	20	18	20	20	16	Ret	21	12	310
20	(New Zealand) Andrew Fawcet	25	23	11	13	12	18	12	Ret	22	Ret	20	18	19	16	11	13	11	Ret	14	22	14	300
21	(New Zealand) Adam Brook	Ret	25	1	17	Ret	Ret	23	Ret	17	10	11	16	Ret	21	3	17	Ret	DNS				297
22	(New Zealand) John Penny	16	22	25	19	Ret	16	Ret	25	Ret	8	12	28	14	13	12	19	18	14	22	Ret	11	277
23	(New Zealand) Connel McLaren	20	21	18	25	23	7	27	26	12	Ret	24	29	22	12	19	16	27	7	26	20	18	257
24	(New Zealand) Nick Ross	14	15	17	14	19	Ret	Ret	15	24	11	21	Ret	18	18	21	21	21	DSQ	12	11	19	231
25	(New Zealand) Inky Tulloch	21	Ret	DNS	Ret	22	12	16	21	Ret	20	19	24	16	14	24	15	15	18	23	Ret	16	223
26	(New Zealand) Dale Lambert	13	10	24	23	20	Ret	17	17	Ret	13	23	10										192
27	(New Zealand) Kevin Williams	Ret	18	23	20	Ret	2	Ret	27	2	26	Ret	Ret	26	Ret	DNS				15	16	Ret	180
28	(New Zealand) Paul Pedersen							6	5	1										11	9	4	169
29	(New Zealand) Chris Adams	22	20	22	22	16	14	Ret	20	20	21	Ret	Ret	21	23	Ret	22	22	19	19	Ret	17	165
30	(New Zealand) Michael Bristow													9	11	DNS	12	7	17	13	12	Ret	154
31	(New Zealand) Eddie Bell	Ret	28	15	26	21	17	26	18	Ret													79
32	(New Zealand) Dave Stewart	Ret	24	Ret	Ret	Wth	Wth	25	19	13	22	28	23										73
33	(New Zealand) Julia Huzziff	Ret	Ret	DNS				22	23	Ret	23	26	26	23	24	22	25	25	21				72
34	(New Zealand) Shaun Turton							24	24	18	24	25	27				26	24	DNS	27	Ret	Ret	70
35	(New Zealand) Darryn Henderson	15	27	Ret	28	18	Ret																45
36	(New Zealand) John Hepburn																24	23	20	21	18	20	27
37	(New Zealand) Gene Rollinson										Ret	22	25										16
-	(Australia) Jack Perkins																			17	19	13	0
Pos	Driver	R1	R2	R3	R1	R2	R3	R1	R2	R3	R1	R2	R3	R1	R2	R3	R1	R2	R3	R1	R2	R3	Pts
Pos	Driver	PUK			RUA			TAU			MAN			TIM			TER			HAM			Pts
