= John McIntyre (racing driver) =

New Zealand racing driver

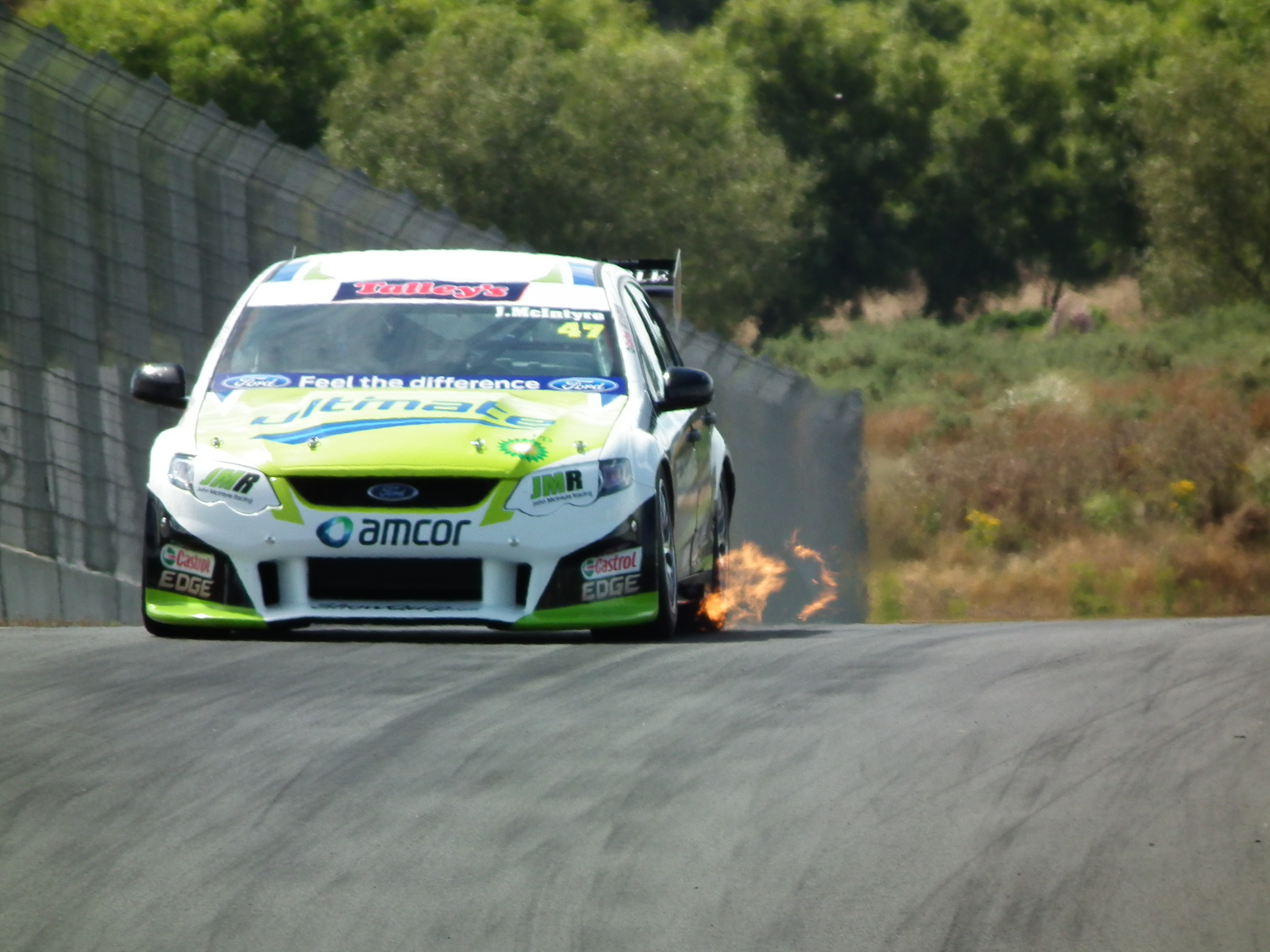
- McIntyre competing in the V8SuperTourer series
- Nationality: (New Zealand) New Zealander
- Born: John Donald McIntyre; 10 March 1977 (age 49) Hastings, New Zealand

Supercars Championship career
- Championships: 0
- Races: 23
- Wins: 0
- Podiums: 2
- Pole positions: 1

John Donald McIntyre (born 10 March 1977) is a New Zealand racing driver from Hastings, New Zealand.

McIntyre competed predominantly in the New Zealand V8 touring car championship, in which he won three championship titles, the most of any driver in the series' history. He also won the inaugural V8SuperTourer sprint series championship in 2012.

Outside of New Zealand, McIntyre competed in the V8 Supercar category in Australia, largely in an endurance driver role. He also established his own racing team in 2006 which he continues to run both in a driving and in a managerial capacity.

== Early career ==
McIntyre begun his motor racing career in 1990, becoming the first minor to race on a permanent racing track in New Zealand at the age of 13. In 1992, McIntyre won the Shell Ultra Challenge Scholarship run by Richard Lester. In 1993, McIntyre won the New Zealand Motor Sports Person of the Year in the Junior Male category.

== Touring car career ==
In 1994, McIntyre begun competing in the Nissan Sentra GT Cup series. He won his first race at the Wellington Street Circuit thus making him the youngest winner in the categories history at the age of 17. In 1996, McIntyre won the Nissan Sentra GT Cup Championship and in doing so became the series' final champion. In 1997, McIntyre shifted to the TraNZam Lights Championship. Despite contesting little over half of the races that season, McIntyre claimed six pole positions, two wins and four second-placed finishes to place seventh in the drivers standings.

By the beginning of the 2000s, McIntyre began competing in the New Zealand V8 Touring Car Championship for Team Kiwi Racing. In his first season, McIntyre had won one race, secured two fastest laps and seven top-five finishes to place fifth in the drivers standings. In 2001, his appearances were more sporadic although he secured two wins at Manfeild and won the round overall. He would also win the Liquor King 500 Endurance Race at Ruapuna.

By 2002, McIntyre moved to Auckland to become more involved with the Team Kiwi Racing outfit. Along with New Zealand touring car duties, McIntyre would also make his V8 Supercar debut in 2002 with the team at the Queensland 500 after winning an evaluation against Angus Fogg at Winton. Co-driving with Jason Richards, the pairing endured a difficult weekend as they finished the race in 22nd and six laps down.

In 2003, McIntyre persisted with the New Zealand V8 Touring Car Championship with Team Kiwi Racing. That year, he claimed three wins along with a further five podiums to finish third overall in the standings and 32 points adrift of that years' champion, Mark Pedersen. In an attempt to arouse attention from V8 Supercar teams, McIntyre made select appearances in the Australian Sports Sedan Championship with Hire Knight Motorsport at Phillip Island and Winton. These proved successful with McIntyre winning both races with which he competed as well as securing pole position at Winton. He also won the Manfeild 4 Hour Endurance Race driving a Ford Sierra RS Cosworth.

In 2004, McIntyre left Team Kiwi Racing and had secured an endurance driver role at the newly-formed WPS Racing in the V8 Supercar series. In the Sandown 500, he would be paired with former Formula One driver, Alex Yoong. The campaign proved disastorous with both team cars encountering multiple spin throughout the day, losing an array of laps as they became bogged down in the treacherously muddy runoff. For the Bathurst 1000, McIntyre would be paired with regular series driver, David Besnard. The car lacked pace throughout the weekend and ultimately retired from the race after 99 laps due to an engine failure whilst inside the top ten. Despite the disappointing results, McIntyre was given his solo-driving V8 Supercar debut on the streets of the Gold Coast, deputising for Besnard who would be making his Champ Car debut that same weekend. He wouldn't qualify well but finished within the top 20 for both races. That year, he also finished fifth overall in the standings for the Porsche GT3 Cup Trans-Tasman.

Over the next two seasons, McIntyre continued to compete in the New Zealand V8 series. Now with Tracer Motorsport, McIntyre proved himself to be one of the pace-setters of the championship. Regularly amassing wins and came close to winning the championship in 2006, had not for a disastorous round at Teretonga. He also made a one-off appearance in the V8 Ute Racing Series in Australia at Winton where he competed strongly. He would also win the 24 Hours of Nürburgring in the N2 class driving a Honda Civic Type R.

In 2007, McIntyre would finally break through for his first New Zealand V8 championship title, winning by nine points over nearest rival, Kayne Scott after a dramatic final race. He also won the Jim Clark Trophy, was the recipient of the Ernie Sprague Memorial Trophy at Timaru, and was part of the closest race win in the series' history (0.024 seconds). Throughout the year, McIntyre would make two appearances in the Fujitsu V8 Supercar Development Series. The first came at Queensland with Prodigy Motorsport and the second at Oran Park with MW Motorsport. After these appearances, he was approached by Ross Stone to compete alongside Shane van Gisbergen at Team Kiwi Racing for the V8 Supercar endurance events. That year, he was also awarded the Presidents Scholarship for session with neuroscientist Kerry Spackman.

The next season, McIntyre retained the New Zealand V8 touring car championship with a largely dominant campaign that also saw him win the New Zealand Gold Star. He also made a one-off appearance in the V8 Supercar series, co-driving with Fabian Coulthard at Phillip Island with Paul Cruickshank Racing. The performances throughout the weekend incentivised Stone Brothers Racing to re-sign him for their endurance plans from 2009 where he would co-drive with Daniel Gaunt. McIntyre narrowly lost out on the New Zealand V8 championship in 2009. In 2010, he once again would have to settle for runner-up position. He would also make a one-off appearance in the Toyota Racing Series open-wheeler series at Taupō.

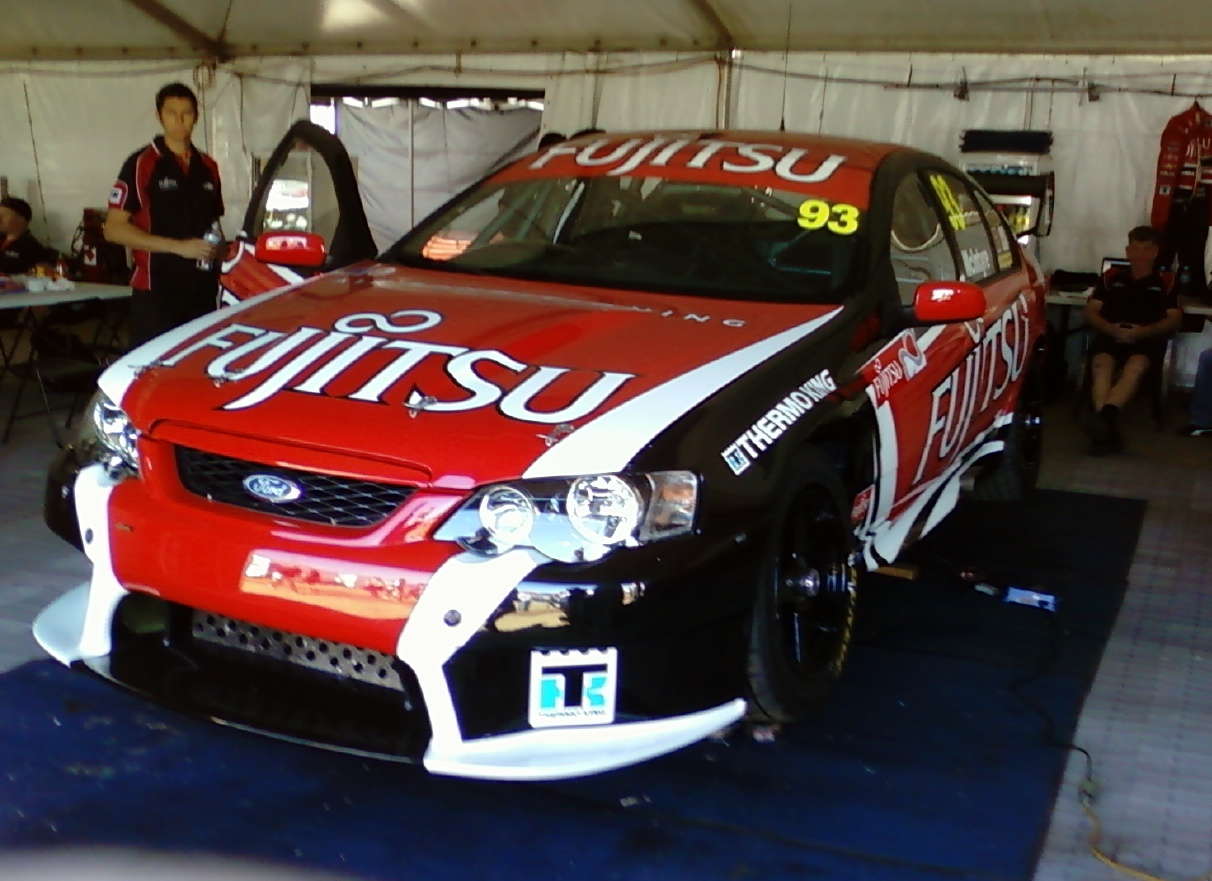
McIntyre's car in preparation for the 2010 Adelaide Fujitsu V8 Supercar round

In 2010, McIntyre would reunite with Van Gisbergen for the V8 Supercar endurance events at Stone Brothers Racing. McIntyre would make a one-off appearance at the Adelaide Street Circuit in the Fujitsu V8 Supercar Series for Stone Brothers Racing as a replacement for Scott McLaughlin who was unable to acquire the necessary licence in time. McIntyre competed strongly throughout the weekend, securing a podium in the first race. The second race came to a premature end when he crashed heavily at the notorious turn eight corner. Despite a strong showing at Phillip Island, the team struggled for pace at Bathurst and the pairing finished 21st on the day. At the Gold Coast 600, the pairing enjoyed strong pace throughout the weekend. McIntyre secured his first podium in the category in the first race of the weekend when they finished third. In the second race of the weekend, the pairing came close to victory as Van Gisbergen hunted down Jamie Whincup in the dying laps of the race. In somewhat controversial circumstances, McIntyre and Van Gisbergen would have to settle for second on the day. In 2011, McIntyre and Van Gisbergen finished fifth at Phillip Island before picking up his best finishing position in The Great Race when they placed sixth. Back in New Zealand, McIntyre would win his third New Zealand V8 championship in typically dominant fashion. He would also secure his third New Zealand Gold Star accolade.

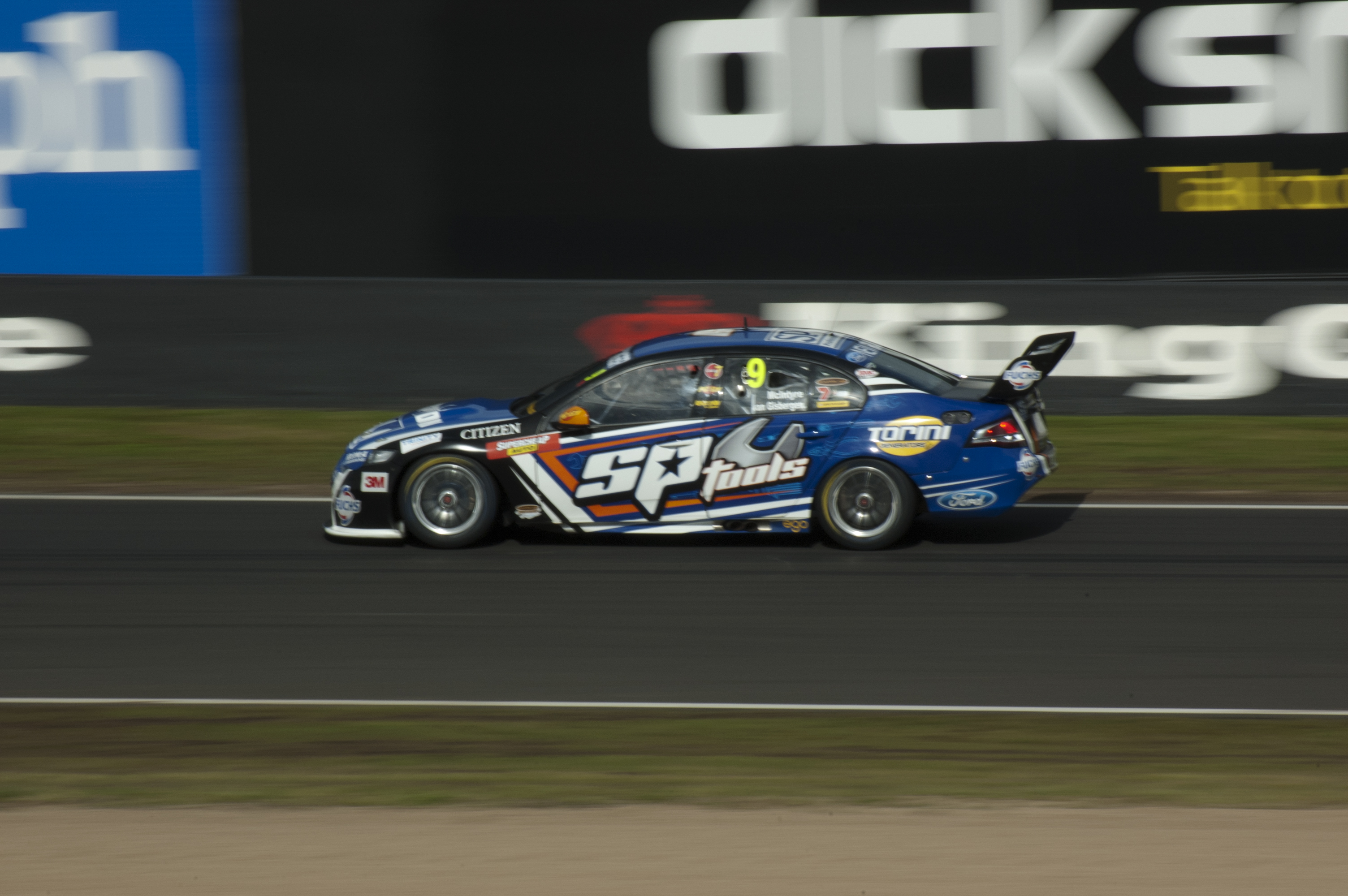
McIntyre racing in the 2011 Bathurst 1000

In 2012, McIntyre joined the breakaway V8SuperTourer series. Through a consistent campaign that included a win at Ruapuna, McIntyre became the inaugural V8SuperTourer sprint series champion. In the V8 Supercar series, McIntyre would sign with Ford Performance Racing to drive alongside Will Davison in the endurance events. Despite showing strong pace, the race results proved underwhelming with the pairing encountering problems in both events. The following year, McIntyre would shift over to Charlie Schwerkolt Racing to pair with Alex Davison. These races would ultimately prove to be McIntyre's last in the V8 Supercar championship.

By 2013, McIntyre had begun to wind down his racing commitments. He made a one-off appearance in the New Zealand V8 series in the TL class at Pukekohe where he dominated the weekend. He also competed with success in the South Island Endurance Series. However, in the V8SuperTourer series, results had floundered. After only scoring two podiums throughout the year, McIntyre would relinquish full-time driving duties to Mark Gibson for 2014.

Over the next few years, McIntyre continued to drove sporadically throughout an array of endurance events, achieving success in both the North Island and South Island Endurance Championships.

== Career results ==
=== Career summary ===
Season	Series	Team	Races	Wins	Poles	F. Laps	Podiums	Points	Position
1996	Nissan Sentra GT Cup		?	?	?	?	?	?	**1st**
1997	TraNZam Lights		?	?	?	?	?	?	?
2000	New Zealand V8 Touring Car Championship		?	1	?	2	?	?	5th
2001	New Zealand V8 Touring Car Championship		?	2	?	?	?	?	15th
2002	New Zealand 2-Litre Touring Car Championship	Team Kiwi Racing	?	?	?	?	?	?	6th
2002	V8 Supercar Championship Series	Team Kiwi Racing	1	0	0	0	0	0	66th
2003	New Zealand V8 Touring Car Championship	Team Kiwi Racing	18	3	?	?	8	321	**3rd**
2003	Australian Sports Sedan Championship	Hire Knight Motorsport	2	2	1	0	2	?	?
2004	New Zealand V8 Touring Car Championship	Pedersen Sheehan Racing	3	2	1	1	2	76	21st
2004	V8 Supercar Championship Series	WPS Racing	4	0	0	0	0	199	46th
2004	Porsche GT3 Cup Trans-Tasman		9	0	?	?	?	561	5th
2005	New Zealand V8 Touring Car Championship	Tracer Motorsport	21	7	2	?	12	1097	**3rd**
2005	V8 Ute Racing Series	Manfeild Park Trust	3	0	0	0	0	?	34th
2006	New Zealand V8s	Tracer Motorsport	21	4	?	?	7	767	6th
2007	New Zealand V8s	John McIntyre Racing	21	5	1	2	9	1104	**1st**
2007	V8 Supercar Championship Series	Team Kiwi Racing	2	0	0	0	0	0	58th
2007	Fujitsu V8 Supercar Series	Prodigy Motorsport; MW Motorsport	6	0	0	0	0	26	27th
2008	New Zealand V8s	John McIntyre Racing	18	7	2	?	9	1004	**1st**
2008	V8 Supercar Championship Series	Paul Cruickshank Racing	1	0	0	0	0	128	51st
2009	New Zealand V8s	John McIntyre Racing	21	5	?	?	11	1170	**2nd**
2009	Toyota Racing Series	John McIntyre Racing	3	0	0	0	0	111	17th
2009	V8 Supercar Championship Series	Stone Brothers Racing	2	0	0	0	0	213	41st
2009	Battery Town Porsche GT3 Cup New Zealand		?	?	?	?	?	?	5th
2010	New Zealand V8s	John McIntyre Racing	18	7	?	?	9	916	**2nd**
2010	V8 Supercar Championship Series	Stone Brothers Racing	4	0	0	0	2	442	38th
2010	Fujitsu V8 Supercar Series	Stone Brothers Racing	2	0	0	0	1	129	36th
2011	New Zealand V8s	John McIntyre Racing	21	8	?	?	14	1156	**1st**
2011	International V8 Supercars Championship	Stone Brothers Racing	2	0	0	0	0	393	35th
2012	V8SuperTourers - Sprint Championship	John McIntyre Racing	12	1	0	1	6	2555	**1st**
2012	V8SuperTourers - Endurance Championship	John McIntyre Racing	7	0	0	0	2	771	11th
2012	International V8 Supercars Championship	Ford Performance Racing	3	0	0	0	0	186	48th
2013	V8SuperTourers	John McIntyre Racing	21	0	0	0	2	1667	15th
2013	New Zealand V8s	John McIntyre Racing	3	2	0	0	3	217	12th
2013	International V8 Supercars Championship	Charlie Schwerkolt Racing	4	0	0	0	0	363	44th
2015	V8SuperTourers	John McIntyre Racing	9	0	0	0	0	882	12th
2015	Australian GT Championship		?	?	?	?	?	?	?

=== Supercars Championship results ===
(Races in bold indicate pole position) (Races in italics indicate fastest lap)

Supercars results
Year	Team	No.	Car	1	2	3	4	5	6	7	8	9	10	11	12	13	14	15	16	17	18	19	20	21	22	23	24	25	26	27	28	29	30	31	32	33	34	35	36	37	38	Position	Points
2002	Team Kiwi Racing	021	Holden Commodore (VT)	ADE; R1	ADE; R2	PHI; R3	PHI; R4	EAS; R5	EAS; R6	EAS; R7	HDV; R8	HDV; R9	HDV; R10	CAN; R11	CAN; R12	CAN; R13	BAR; R14	BAR; R15	BAR; R16	ORA; R17	ORA; R18	WIN; R19	WIN; R20	QLD; R21; 22	BAT; R22	SUR; R23	SUR; R24	PUK; R25	PUK; R26	PUK; R27	SAN; R28	SAN; R29										66th	0
2004	WPS Racing	23/48	Ford Falcon (BA)	ADE; R1	ADE; R2	EAS; R3	PUK; R4	PUK; R5	PUK; R6	HDV; R7	HDV; R8	HDV; R9	BAR; R10	BAR; R11	BAR; R12	QLD; R13	WIN; R14	ORA; R15	ORA; R16	SAN; R17; 21	BAT; R18; Ret	SUR; R19; 19	SUR; R20; 19	SYM; R21	SYM; R22	SYM; R23																46th	199
2007	Team Kiwi Racing	021	Ford Falcon (BF)	ADE; R1	ADE; R2	BAR; R3	BAR; R4	BAR; R5	PUK; R6	PUK; R7	PUK; R8	WIN; R9	WIN; R10	WIN; R11	EAS; R12	EAS; R13	EAS; R14	HDV; R15	HDV; R16	HDV; R17	QLD; R18	QLD; R19	QLD; R20	ORA; R21	ORA; R22	ORA; R23	SAN; R24; 20	BAT; R25; Ret	SUR; R26	SUR; R27	SUR; R28	BHR; R29	BHR; R30	BHR; R31	SYM; R32	SYM; R33	SYM; R34	PHI; R35	PHI; R36	PHI; R37		58th	0
2008	Paul Cruickshank Racing	111	Ford Falcon (BF)	ADE; R1	ADE; R2	EAS; R3	EAS; R4	EAS; R5	HAM; R6	HAM; R7	HAM; R8	BAR; R9	BAR; R10	BAR; R11	SAN; R12	SAN; R13	SAN; R14	HDV; R15	HDV; R16	HDV; R17	QLD; R18	QLD; R19	QLD; R20	WIN; R21	WIN; R22	WIN; R23	PHI; QR	PHI; R24; 16	BAT; R25	SUR; R26	SUR; R27	SUR; R28	BHR; R29	BHR; R30	BHR; R31	SYM; R32	SYM; R33	SYM; R34	ORA; R35	ORA; R36	ORA; R37	51st	128
2009	Stone Brothers Racing	4	Ford Falcon (FG)	ADE; R1	ADE; R2	HAM; R3	HAM; R4	WIN; R5	WIN; R6	SYM; R7	SYM; R8	HDV; R9	HDV; R10	TOW; R11	TOW; R12	SAN; R13	SAN; R14	QLD; R15	QLD; R16	PHI; QR; 8	PHI; R17; 17	BAT; R18; 19	SUR; R19	SUR; R20	SUR; R21	SUR; R22	PHI; R23	PHI; R24	BAR; R25	BAR; R26	SYD; R27	SYD; R28										41st	213
2010	Stone Brothers Racing	9	Ford Falcon (FG)	YMC; R1	YMC; R2	BHR; R3	BHR; R4	ADE; R5	ADE; R6	HAM; R7	HAM; R8	QLD; R9	QLD; R10	WIN; R11	WIN; R12	HDV; R13	HDV; R14	TOW; R15	TOW; R16	PHI; R17; 27	BAT; R18; 21	SUR; R19; 3	SUR; R20; 2	SYM; R21	SYM; R22	SAN; R23	SAN; R24	SYD; R25	SYD; R26													38th	442
2011	Stone Brothers Racing	9	Ford Falcon (FG)	YMC; R1	YMC; R2	ADE; R3	ADE; R4	HAM; R5	HAM; R6	BAR; R7	BAR; R8	BAR; R9	WIN; R10	WIN; R11	HID; R12	HID; R13	TOW; R14	TOW; R15	QLD; R16	QLD; R17	QLD; R18	PHI; R19; 5	BAT; R20; 6	SUR; R21	SUR; R22	SYM; R23	SYM; R24	SAN; R25	SAN; R26	SYD; R27	SYD; R28											35th	393
2012	Ford Performance Racing	6	Ford Falcon (FG)	ADE; R1	ADE; R2	SYM; R3	SYM; R4	HAM; R5	HAM; R6	BAR; R7	BAR; R8	BAR; R9	PHI; R10	PHI; R11	HID; R12	HID; R13	TOW; R14	TOW; R15	QLD; R16	QLD; R17	SMP; R18	SMP; R19	**SAN**; **QR**; **4**	SAN; R20; 17	BAT; R21; 24	SUR; R22	SUR; R23	YMC; R24	YMC; R25	YMC; R26	WIN; R27	WIN; R28	SYD; R29	SYD; R30								48th	186
2013	Charlie Schwerkolt Racing	18	Ford Falcon (FG)	ADE; R1	ADE; R2	SYM; R3	SYM; R4	SYM; R5	PUK; R6	PUK; R7	PUK; R8	PUK; R9	BAR; R10	BAR; R11	BAR; R12	COA; R13	COA; R14	COA; R15	COA; R16	HID; R17	HID; R18	HID; R19	TOW; R20	TOW; R21	QLD; R22	QLD; R23	QLD; R24	WIN; R25	WIN; R26	WIN; R27	SAN; R28; 10	BAT; R29; 23	SUR; R30; 14	SUR; R31; 14	PHI; R32	PHI; R33	PHI; R34	SYD; R35	SYD; R36			44th	363

=== Complete Bathurst 1000 results ===
Year	Car#	Team	Car	Co-driver	Position	Laps
2004	23	WPS Racing	Ford BA Falcon	(Australia) David Besnard	DNF	99
2007	021	Team Kiwi Racing	Ford BF Falcon	(New Zealand) Shane van Gisbergen	DNF	148
2009	4	Stone Brothers Racing	Ford FG Falcon	(New Zealand) Daniel Gaunt	19th	160
2010	9	Stone Brothers Racing	Ford FG Falcon	(New Zealand) Shane van Gisbergen	21st	158
2011	9	Stone Brothers Racing	Ford FG Falcon	(New Zealand) Shane van Gisbergen	6th	161
2012	6	Ford Performance Racing	Ford FG Falcon	(Australia) Will Davison	24th	143
2013	18	Charlie Schwerkolt Racing	Ford FG Falcon	(Australia) Alex Davison	13th	161
