= Spackman =

Spackman is an English surname. Notable people with the surname include:

- Carol Spackman Moss, American politician
- Charles Spackman (1891–1969), English recipient of the Victoria Cross
- Charles Spackman Barker (1806–1879), British inventor and organ builder
- Clare S. Spackman (1909–1992), American occupational therapist
- Isaac Spackman (d. 1771), English painter and illustrator
- Kerry Spackman (b. 1956), New Zealand cognitive neuroscientist
- Marc Spackman (b. 1979), English swimmer
- Nigel Spackman (b. 1960), English football manager
- Victoria Spackman, New Zealand creative director and business executive
- W. M. Spackman (1905–1990), American writer
