= 2013 New Zealand V8 season =

The 2013 New Zealand V8 season was the fourteenth season of the series, under the NZV8 guise. The season began at Teretonga Park on 11 January and finished at the Pukekohe Park Raceway ITM Auckland 400 V8 Supercars event on 14 April after five championship meetings. The TLX Championship was won by Jason Bargwanna and the TL Championship was won by AJ Lauder.

== Race calendar ==
Rnd	Circuit	Date	Map
1	Teretonga Park (Invercargill, Southland Region)	12–13 January	2013 New Zealand V8 season is located in New Zealand
2	Timaru International Motor Raceway (Timaru, Canterbury Region)	19–20 January	2013 New Zealand V8 season is located in New Zealand
3	Manfeild Autocourse (Feilding, Manawatū District)	9–10 February	2013 New Zealand V8 season is located in New Zealand
4	Taupo Motorsport Park (Taupō, Waikato)	9–10 March	2013 New Zealand V8 season is located in New Zealand
5	Pukekohe Park Raceway (Pukekohe, Auckland Region)	13–14 April	2013 New Zealand V8 season is located in New Zealand

== Teams and drivers ==
TLX Championship
Manufacturer	Vehicle	Team	No	Driver	Rounds
Holden	Commodore (VE)	Tulloch Motorsport	2	(Australia) Jason Bargwanna	All
Holden	Commodore (VE)	Concept Motorsport	007	(New Zealand) Nick Ross	All
Ford	Falcon (FG)	Haydn Mackenzie Motorsport	20	(New Zealand) Haydn Mackenzie	3, 5
Toyota	Camry (XV50)	Richards Team Motorsport	5	(New Zealand) Martin Short	All
Toyota	Camry (XV50)	Richards Team Motorsport	44	(New Zealand) Brent Collins	4–5
TL Championship
Manufacturer	Vehicle	Team	No	Driver	Rounds
Ford	Falcon (BF)	Hamilton Motorsports	3	(New Zealand) Lance Hughes	5
Ford	Falcon (BF)	Eco Light	4	(New Zealand) Glenn Inkster	5
Ford	Falcon (BF)	Alan McCarrison Racing	9	(New Zealand) Alan McCarrison	3
Ford	Falcon (BF)	Carters Tyre Service	11	(New Zealand) Tom Alexander	5
Ford	Falcon (BF)	InterIslander	12	(New Zealand) Straun Robinson	All
Ford	Falcon (BF)	Kawasaki Power Tools	14	(New Zealand) Shaun Varney	All
Ford	Falcon (BF)	Team Aegis Racing	15	(New Zealand) Brad Lauder	All
Ford	Falcon (BF)	Team Aegis Racing	87	(New Zealand) AJ Lauder	All
Ford	Falcon (BF)	Blueprint Diesel	17	(New Zealand) Nigel Karl	4–5
Ford	Falcon (BF)	Mobil 1	21	(New Zealand) Malcolm Finch	5
Ford	Falcon (BF)	CB Norwood Distributors	35	(New Zealand) Mark Gibson	5
Ford	Falcon (BF)	Gaskin Ford & Mazda	41	(New Zealand) Jamie Gaskin	5
Ford	Falcon (BF)	Carters Tyres Pukekohe	45	(New Zealand) Paul Irwin	5
Ford	Falcon (BF)	John McIntyre Racing	47	(New Zealand) John McIntyre	5
Ford	Falcon (BF)	Rapid Construction Ltd	63	(New Zealand) Nicholas Farrier	5
Ford	Falcon (BF)	Discount Tyres Invercargill	69	(New Zealand) Liam McDonald	1–2, 5
Ford	Falcon (BF)	Corporate Academy Group	111	(New Zealand) Todd Pelham	4–5
Ford	Falcon (BF)	Total Access	555	(New Zealand) Jack Kofoed	5
Holden	Commodore (VY)	Strapping Systems NZ Ltd	8	(New Zealand) Kevin Williams	3, 5
Holden	Commodore (VY)	New Zealand Home Loans	22	(New Zealand) Matt Booth	5
Holden	Commodore (VY)	Innovative Conveyor Systems	28	(New Zealand) Ian Booth	3–5
Holden	Commodore (VY)	Holden Haven Racing	40	(New Zealand) Bronson Porter	2–5
Holden	Commodore (VY)	X Track	51	(New Zealand) James McLaughlin	3–5
Holden	Commodore (VY)	Pinepac Racing	70	(New Zealand) Andrew Anderson	3, 5
Holden	Commodore (VY)	Ross Cameron Racing	74	(New Zealand) Ross Cameron	4
Holden	Commodore (VY)	Grant Molloy Racing	99	(New Zealand) Grant Molloy	1

== Calendar ==
Round		Circuit	Winning driver	Winning team
1	R1	Teretonga Park	(New Zealand) Martin Short	Richards Team Motorsport
1	R2	Teretonga Park	(Australia) Jason Bargwanna	Tulloch Motorsport
1	R3	Teretonga Park	(Australia) Jason Bargwanna	Tulloch Motorsport
2	R1	Timaru International Motor Raceway	(Australia) Jason Bargwanna	Tulloch Motorsport
2	R2	Timaru International Motor Raceway	(Australia) Jason Bargwanna	Tulloch Motorsport
2	R3	Timaru International Motor Raceway	(New Zealand) Martin Short	Richards Team Motorsport
3	R1	Manfeild Autocourse	(Australia) Jason Bargwanna	Tulloch Motorsport
3	R2	Manfeild Autocourse	(Australia) Jason Bargwanna	Tulloch Motorsport
3	R3	Manfeild Autocourse	(New Zealand) Andrew Anderson	Pinepac Racing
4	R1	Taupo Motorsport Park	(Australia) Jason Bargwanna	Tulloch Motorsport
4	R2	Taupo Motorsport Park	(New Zealand) Nick Ross	Concept Motorsport
4	R3	Taupo Motorsport Park	(New Zealand) Nick Ross	Concept Motorsport
5	R1	Pukekohe Park Raceway	(Australia) Jason Bargwanna	Tulloch Motorsport
5	R2	Pukekohe Park Raceway	(New Zealand) Martin Short	Richards Team Motorsport
5	R3	Pukekohe Park Raceway	(New Zealand) Nick Ross	Concept Motorsport

== Championship standings ==
=== TLX Championship ===
Pos	Driver	TER			TIM			MAN			TAU			PUK			Pen.	Pts
Pos	Driver	R1	R2	R3	R1	R2	R3	R1	R2	R3	R1	R2	R3	R1	R2	R3	Pen.	Pts
1	(Australia) Jason Bargwanna	3	1	1	1	1	3	1	1	4	1	Ret	5	1	2	2		1016
2	(New Zealand) Nick Ross	2	3	3	Ret	3	2	2	3	1	2	1	1	2	3	1		935
3	(New Zealand) Martin Short	1	2	2	2	2	1	3	2	2	Ret	2	2	4	1	3		935
4	(New Zealand) Haydn Mackenzie							4	4	3				5	5	4		320
5	(New Zealand) Brent Collins										3	3	3	3	4	Ret		294
Pos	Driver	R1	R2	R3	R1	R2	R3	R1	R2	R3	R1	R2	R3	R1	R2	R3	Pen.	Pts
Pos	Driver	TER			TIM			MAN			TAU			PUK			Pen.	Pts

=== TL Championship ===
Pos	Driver	TER			TIM			MAN			TAU			PUK			Pen.	Pts
Pos	Driver	R1	R2	R3	R1	R2	R3	R1	R2	R3	R1	R2	R3	R1	R2	R3	Pen.	Pts
1	(New Zealand) AJ Lauder	1	3	1	2	2	1	3	3	3	1	2	1	6	6	Ret		906
2	(New Zealand) Brad Lauder	6	1	6	3	1	2	4	5	5	5	1	Ret	11	8	9		748
3	(New Zealand) Shaun Varney	2	2	2	1	6	3	5	Ret	8	Ret	6	3	21	15	10		639
4	(New Zealand) Struan Robertson	4	6	4	5	5	4	Ret	6	7	4	8	4	16	14	11		613
5	(New Zealand) Kevin Williams							2	2	2				2	1	3		403
6	(New Zealand) Andrew Anderson							1	1	1				3	11	2		382
7	(New Zealand) James McLaughlin							8	4	6	Ret	4	5	8	5	6		374
8	(New Zealand) Bronson Porter				DNS	4	5	6	Ret	DNS	2	3	Ret	5	Ret	7		366
9	(New Zealand) Liam McDonald	5	5	5	4	3	6							23	13	15		362
10	(New Zealand) Ian Booth							Ret	7	4	7	5	Ret	10	12	17		266
11	(New Zealand) Todd Pelham										3	7	2	7	7	21		263
12	(New Zealand) John McIntyre													1	2	1		217
13	(New Zealand) Grant Molloy	3	4	3														174
14	(New Zealand) Mark Gibson													4	3	4		168
15	(New Zealand) Glenn Inkster													9	4	5		139
16	(New Zealand) Ross Cameron										6	9	7					123
17	(New Zealand) Nigel Karl										Ret	10	6	20	18	20		118
18	(New Zealand) Jamie Gaskin													15	10	8		94
19	(New Zealand) Matt Booth													14	9	14		84
20	(New Zealand) Malcolm Finch													19	16	12		62
21	(New Zealand) Jack Kofoed													12	DNS	13		54
22	(New Zealand) Lance Hughes													17	19	16		52
23	(New Zealand) Nicholas Farrier													18	20	18		44
24	(New Zealand) Alan McCarrison							7	Ret	DNS								42
25	(New Zealand) Paul Irwin													22	17	19		41
26	(New Zealand) Tom Alexander													13	21	Ret		36
	(New Zealand) Greg Browne							Ret	DNS	DNS								0
Pos	Driver	R1	R2	R3	R1	R2	R3	R1	R2	R3	R1	R2	R3	R1	R2	R3	Pen.	Pts
Pos	Driver	TER			TIM			MAN			TAU			PUK			Pen.	Pts
