= 2010–11 New Zealand V8 season =

The 2010–11 New Zealand V8 season was the twelfth season of the series, under the NZV8 guise. The season began at Pukekohe on 5 November 2010 and finished at the Hamilton Street Circuit on 17 April 2011 after seven championship meetings. John McIntyre won the championship by 81 points over 2nd placed Craig Baird, 3rd placed Andy Booth, and 4th placed Angus Fogg.

== Race calendar ==
Rnd	Circuit	Date	Map
2010			2010–11 New Zealand V8 season is located in New Zealand
1	Pukekohe Park Raceway (Pukekohe, Auckland Region)	5–7 November	2010–11 New Zealand V8 season is located in New Zealand
2	Powerbuilt Raceway at Ruapuna Park (Christchurch, Canterbury Region)	26–28 November	2010–11 New Zealand V8 season is located in New Zealand
2011			2010–11 New Zealand V8 season is located in New Zealand
3	Teretonga Park (Invercargill, Southland Region)	14–16 January	2010–11 New Zealand V8 season is located in New Zealand
4	Timaru International Motor Raceway (Timaru, Canterbury Region)	21–23 January	2010–11 New Zealand V8 season is located in New Zealand
5	Manfeild Autocourse (Feilding, Manawatū District)	11–13 February	2010–11 New Zealand V8 season is located in New Zealand
6	Taupo Motorsport Park (Taupō, Waikato)	11–13 March	2010–11 New Zealand V8 season is located in New Zealand
7	Hamilton Street Circuit (Hamilton, Waikato)	17–19 April	2010–11 New Zealand V8 season is located in New Zealand

== Teams and drivers ==
- All teams must adhere to the series' car specification rules. All Holdens must be based upon the body shells of its VT, VX or VY Commodores, with upgrades available to replicate it to a VZ or VE. Similarly for Ford, their cars must be based upon the AU Falcon, with options to replicate the BA.

Manufacturer	Vehicle	Team	No.	Driver	Rounds
Ford	Falcon (BF)	Pedersen Sheehan Racing	1	(New Zealand) Craig Baird	All
Ford	Falcon (BF)	Ballistic Motorsport Team	4	(New Zealand) Simon Richards	All
Ford	Falcon (BF)	Knight Motorsport	5; 205	(New Zealand) Andy Knight	All
Ford	Falcon (BF)	Angus Fogg Racing	6	(New Zealand) Angus Fogg	All
Ford	Falcon (BF)	International Motorsport	9	(New Zealand) Will Bamber	1–5
Ford	Falcon (BF)	International Motorsport	75	(New Zealand) Dean Perkins	6–7
Ford	Falcon (BF)	Martin Short Racing	11	(New Zealand) Martin Short	All
Ford	Falcon (BF)	Tulloch Motorsport	12	(Australia) Jason Bargwanna	1–4, 6
Ford	Falcon (BF)	Tulloch Motorsport	12	(New Zealand) Gene Rollinson	7
Ford	Falcon (BF)	Albany Toyota NZV8	20	(New Zealand) Haydn Mackenzie	1, 5–7
Ford	Falcon (BF)	Penny Homes Racing	22	(New Zealand) John Penny	2–7
Ford	Falcon (BF)	Edgell Performance Racing	26	(New Zealand) Tim Edgell	All
Ford	Falcon (BF)	Ezibuy Racing	28	(New Zealand) Wade Henshaw	2, 5, 7
Ford	Falcon (BF)	John McIntyre Racing	47	(New Zealand) John McIntyre	All
Ford	Falcon (BF)	Eddie Bell Racing	69	(New Zealand) Eddie Bell	All
Ford	Falcon (BF)	Nigel Barclay's Racing Projects	99	(New Zealand) Kayne Scott	All
Holden	Commodore (VZ)	Matt Lockwood Motorsports	3	(New Zealand) Matt Lockwood	5–7
Holden	Commodore (VZ)	Concept Motorsport	007	(New Zealand) Nick Ross	All
Holden	Commodore (VZ)	Concept Motorsport	55	(New Zealand) Christina Orr-West	1, 5–7
Holden	Commodore (VZ)	Paul Manuell Racing	15	(New Zealand) Paul Manuell	All
Holden	Commodore (VZ)	Penny Homes Racing	22	(New Zealand) John Penny	1
Holden	Commodore (VZ)	Penny Homes Racing	33	(New Zealand) David Hopper	All
Holden	Commodore (VZ)	AV8 Motorsport	23	(New Zealand) Andy Booth	All
Holden	Commodore (VZ)	John Hepburn Racing	52	(New Zealand) John Hepburn	1–4, 7
Holden	Commodore (VZ)	Pinepac Racing	70	(New Zealand) Andrew Anderson	All
Holden	Commodore (VZ)	Nigel Barclay's Racing Projects	400	(New Zealand) Scott McLaughlin	All

== Results and standings ==
=== Season summary ===
Round		Event	Circuit	Winning driver	Winning team
1	R1	Fujitsu 200	Pukekohe Park Raceway	(New Zealand) John McIntyre	John McIntyre Racing
1	R2	Fujitsu 200	Pukekohe Park Raceway	(New Zealand) John McIntyre	John McIntyre Racing
1	R3	Fujitsu 200	Pukekohe Park Raceway	(New Zealand) Andy Booth	AV8 Motorsport
2	R1	Altherm 500	Powerbuilt Raceway at Ruapuna Park	(New Zealand) Craig Baird	Pedersen Sheehan Racing
2	R2	Altherm 500	Powerbuilt Raceway at Ruapuna Park	(New Zealand) John McIntyre	John McIntyre Racing
2	R3	Altherm 500	Powerbuilt Raceway at Ruapuna Park	(New Zealand) Andy Knight	Knight Motorsport
3	R1	Zoagn 200	Teretonga Park	(New Zealand) John McIntyre	John McIntyre Racing
3	R2	Zoagn 200	Teretonga Park	(New Zealand) Kayne Scott	Nigel Barclay's Racing Projects
3	R3	Zoagn 200	Teretonga Park	(New Zealand) Angus Fogg	Angus Fogg Racing
4	R1	Juiced Up 200	Timaru International Motor Raceway	(New Zealand) Angus Fogg	Angus Fogg Racing
4	R2	Juiced Up 200	Timaru International Motor Raceway	(New Zealand) Angus Fogg	Angus Fogg Racing
4	R3	Juiced Up 200	Timaru International Motor Raceway	(Australia) Jason Bargwanna	Tulloch Motorsport
5	R1	CRC 200	Manfeild Autocourse	(New Zealand) Kayne Scott	Nigel Barclay's Racing Projects
5	R2	CRC 200	Manfeild Autocourse	(New Zealand) Tim Edgell	Edgell Performance Racing
5	R3	CRC 200	Manfeild Autocourse	(New Zealand) John McIntyre	John McIntyre Racing
6	R1	Battery Town 200	Taupo Motorsport Park	(New Zealand) Kayne Scott	Nigel Barclay's Racing Projects
6	R2	Battery Town 200	Taupo Motorsport Park	(Australia) Jason Bargwanna	Tulloch Motorsport
6	R3	Battery Town 200	Taupo Motorsport Park	(New Zealand) Scott McLaughlin	Nigel Barclay's Racing Projects
7	R1	ITM Hamilton 400	Hamilton Street Circuit	(New Zealand) John McIntyre	John McIntyre Racing
7	R2	ITM Hamilton 400	Hamilton Street Circuit	(New Zealand) John McIntyre	John McIntyre Racing
7	R3	ITM Hamilton 400	Hamilton Street Circuit	(New Zealand) John McIntyre	John McIntyre Racing

=== Championship standings ===
Pos	Driver	PUK			RUA			TER			TIM			MAN			TAU			HAM			Pts
Pos	Driver	R1	R2	R3	R1	R2	R3	R1	R2	R3	R1	R2	R3	R1	R2	R3	R1	R2	R3	R1	R2	R3	Pts
1	(New Zealand) John McIntyre	1	1	Ret	DSQ	1	4	1	2	12	3	3	3	Ret	9	1	1	2	5	2	1	1	1156
2	(New Zealand) Craig Baird	3	2	7	1	3	5	2	1	2	2	2	Ret	2	4	12	5	5	Ret	3	18	6	1075
3	(New Zealand) Andy Booth	Ret	9	1	2	4	6	7	8	5	5	5	4	3	7	6	7	Ret	2	4	3	2	1002
4	(New Zealand) Angus Fogg	5	4	2	3	2	2	4	5	1	1	1	9	18	6	3	3	7	14	1	Ret	3	975
5	(New Zealand) Andy Knight	6	5	4	Ret	7	1	8	11	3	6	4	13	5	3	9	8	6	4	5	Ret	8	898
6	(New Zealand) Tim Edgell	2	3	8	Ret	10	3	3	4	15	13	11	8	1	1	8	18	9	Ret	18	9	9	824
7	(New Zealand) Paul Manuell	4	Ret	3	8	6	Ret	9	6	13	8	7	7	15	13	2	4	3	6	21	8	10	789
8	(New Zealand) Scott McLaughlin	8	7	16	10	9	Ret	6	7	9	7	13	Ret	7	5	Ret	6	4	1	10	7	5	755
9	(New Zealand) Nick Ross	12	11	11	15	13	10	Ret	15	8	12	Ret	2	10	15	7	Ret	12	3	11	10	7	621
10	(New Zealand) Eddie Bell	11	16	12	9	5	8	Ret	13	4	11	8	Ret	16	12	Ret	10	8	15	7	2	Ret	605
11	(Australia) Jason Bargwanna	7	6	17	DSQ	DSQ	DSQ	5	3	6	4	6	1				2	1	13				603
12	(New Zealand) John Penny	10	8	Ret	6	8	Ret	11	12	7	9	Ret	11	11	14	10	12	11	8	12	11	11	592
13	(New Zealand) Andrew Anderson	15	19	10	7	11	9	10	9	18	17	16	10	8	19	14	9	16	12	8	5	20	590
14	(New Zealand) Simon Richards	9	10	13	11	12	11	13	16	16	16	12	6	9	10	17	12	17	9	16	19	16	572
15	(New Zealand) Martin Short	Ret	13	5	5	14	7	12	10	17	10	15	12	17	11	5	14	13	7	20	Ret	DNS	539
16	(New Zealand) Wade Henshaw				4	17	12							4	2	11				6	4	4	414
17	(New Zealand) David Hopper	17	14	Ret	14	16	13	15	Ret	11	18	14	Ret	14	17	16	15	15	Ret	14	14	21	360
18	(New Zealand) Will Bamber	18	12	6	12	15	14	14	14	10	14	10	Ret	Ret	18	Ret							317
19	(New Zealand) John Hepburn	13	18	14	13	Ret	DNS	Ret	17	14	15	9	5							15	15	15	311
20	(New Zealand) Christina Orr-West	16	15	15										13	20	15	13	14	11	19	17	18	259
21	(New Zealand) Matt Lockwood													6	8	13	Ret	DNS	16	9	6	13	242
22	(New Zealand) Haydn Mackenzie	14	17	9										12	16	4	16	Ret	DNS	Ret	16	19	236
23	(New Zealand) Dean Perkins																11	10	10	17	13	17	165
24	(New Zealand) Kayne Scott	DSQ	DSQ	DSQ	DSQ	DSQ	DSQ	DSQ	DSQ	DSQ	DSQ	DSQ	DSQ	DSQ	DSQ	DSQ	DSQ	DSQ	DSQ	13	12	12	86
25	(New Zealand) Gene Rollinson																			22	21	14	26
Pos	Driver	R1	R2	R3	R1	R2	R3	R1	R2	R3	R1	R2	R3	R1	R2	R3	R1	R2	R3	R1	R2	R3	Pts
Pos	Driver	PUK			RUA			TER			TIM			MAN			TAU			HAM			Pts

Colour	Result
Gold	Winner
Silver	Second place
Bronze	Third place
Green	Points classification
Blue	Non-points classification
Blue	Non-classified finish (NC)
Purple	Retired, not classified (Ret)
Red	Did not qualify (DNQ)
Red	Did not pre-qualify (DNPQ)
Black	Disqualified (DSQ)
White	Did not start (DNS)
White	Withdrew (WD)
White	Race cancelled (C)
Blank	Did not practice (DNP)
Blank	Did not arrive (DNA)
Blank	Excluded (EX)
