= 2002–03 New Zealand V8 season =

2002–03 New Zealand V8s season

Seasons
- ← 2001–02 2003–04 →

The 2002–03 New Zealand V8 season (known for commercial reasons as the 2002–03 Parker ENZED NZV8s Championship) was a motor racing series for New Zealand V8 touring cars. It consisted of seven rounds beginning on October 19 in 2002 at Ruapuna and concluded on March 30 2003 at Manfeild Autocourse.

The championship was won by Mark Pedersen. An endurance race that inaugurated the season was won by Pedersen and Paul Radisich.

== Race calendar ==
Rnd	Circuit	Date	Map
2002			2002–03 New Zealand V8 season is located in New Zealand
1	Powerbuilt Raceway at Ruapuna Park (Christchurch, Canterbury Region)	19–20 October	2002–03 New Zealand V8 season is located in New Zealand
2	Pukekohe Park Raceway (Pukekohe, Auckland Region)	9–10 November	2002–03 New Zealand V8 season is located in New Zealand
2003			2002–03 New Zealand V8 season is located in New Zealand
3	Teretonga Park (Invercargill, Southland Region)	4–5 January	2002–03 New Zealand V8 season is located in New Zealand
4	Timaru International Motor Raceway (Timaru, Canterbury Region)	11–12 January	2002–03 New Zealand V8 season is located in New Zealand
5	Manfeild Autocourse (Feilding, Manawatū District)	1–2 February	2002–03 New Zealand V8 season is located in New Zealand
6	Taupo Motorsport Park (Taupō, Waikato)	15–16 March	2002–03 New Zealand V8 season is located in New Zealand
7	Manfeild Autocourse (Feilding, Manawatū District)	29–30 March	2002–03 New Zealand V8 season is located in New Zealand

== Teams and drivers ==
Championship entries						Endurance entries
Manufacturer	Vehicle	Team	No.	Driver	Rounds	Co-Driver
Ford	Ford Falcon (AU)	ENZED	06	(New Zealand) Brady Kennett	2–5, 7	—N/a
Ford	Ford Falcon (AU)	ENZED	06	(New Zealand) Ken Smith	6	—N/a
Ford	Ford Falcon (AU)	Nick Ross Racing	7	(New Zealand) Nick Ross	2–7	—N/a
Ford	Ford Falcon (AU)	Pedersen Sheehan Racing	11	(New Zealand) Peter Van Bruegel	All	(New Zealand) Greg Brinck
Ford	Ford Falcon (AU)	Pedersen Sheehan Racing	027	(New Zealand) Mark Pedersen	All	(New Zealand) Paul Radisich
Ford	Ford Falcon (AU)	Dean McMillan Racing	18	(New Zealand) Dean McMillan	2–6	—N/a
Ford	Ford Falcon (AU)	Team Hicks Racing	19	(New Zealand) Martin Hicks	2–5, 7	—N/a
Ford	Ford Falcon (AU)	Ballistic Motorsport	30	(New Zealand) Ashley Hall	5, 7	—N/a
Ford	Ford Falcon (AU)	Ballistic Motorsport	31	(New Zealand) David Parsons	5, 7	—N/a
Ford	Ford Falcon (AU)	GT Radial Tyres	75	(New Zealand) Dean Perkins	All	(New Zealand) Grant Silvester
Ford	Ford Falcon (AU)	Tracer Motorsport	96	(New Zealand) Paul Pedersen	2–7	—N/a
Ford	Ford Falcon (AU)		111	(New Zealand) Aaron Slight	1	(United Kingdom) Andy Priaulx
Ford	Ford Falcon (AU)	PartsWorld	800	(New Zealand) Peter Butler	All	(New Zealand) Kevin Hyde
Ford	Ford Falcon (EL)		10	(New Zealand) Andrew Fawcet	1	(New Zealand) Wayne Huxford
Ford	Ford Falcon (EL)	Tradestaff	17	(New Zealand) Paul Hinton	2–7	—N/a
Ford	Ford Falcon (EL)	Mag & Turbo	89	(New Zealand) Dale Lambert	2–7	—N/a
Holden	Holden Commodore (VX)	Dynapac	3	(New Zealand) Aaron Harris	2–7	—N/a
Holden	Holden Commodore (VX)		4	(New Zealand) Peter Sturgeon	1	(New Zealand) Stephen Jones
Holden	Holden Commodore (VX)		9	(New Zealand) Steve Rae	1–2	(New Zealand) Rob Lewis
Holden	Holden Commodore (VX)		9	(New Zealand) Rob Lewis	3–4	—N/a
Holden	Holden Commodore (VX)		12	(New Zealand) Michael Wallace	1, 3–4, 6	(New Zealand) Hamish Cross
Holden	Holden Commodore (VX)	Orix Racing	15	(New Zealand) Paul Manuell	All	(New Zealand) Craig Gilbert
Holden	Holden Commodore (VX)		16	(New Zealand) Andrew Talley	1	(New Zealand) Richard Pollock
Holden	Holden Commodore (VX)	Team Kiwi Racing	021	(New Zealand) John McIntyre	All	(New Zealand) Andy Booth
Holden	Holden Commodore (VX)	Team Kiwi Racing	777	(New Zealand) Andy Booth	2–7	—N/a
Holden	Holden Commodore (VX)	Strapping Systems	25	(New Zealand) Kevin Williams	2, 5–7	—N/a
Holden	Holden Commodore (VX)	Mike Pero Racing	28	(New Zealand) Wade Henshaw	All	(New Zealand) Rick Armstrong
Holden	Holden Commodore (VX)	Mike Pero Racing	29	(New Zealand) Bernard Gillon	All	(New Zealand) Wade Henshaw
Holden	Holden Commodore (VX)		36	(New Zealand) Miles Pope	1–2, 5–6	(New Zealand) Bill Farmer
Holden	Holden Commodore (VX)		38	(New Zealand) Glenn Collins	1–6	(New Zealand) Paul Pedersen
Holden	Holden Commodore (VX)		38	(New Zealand) Andrew Fawcet	7	—N/a
Holden	Holden Commodore (VX)	StaffCV.com	42	(New Zealand) Phil Stewart	All	(New Zealand) Jason Kerr
Holden	Holden Commodore (VX)	Hydraulink	69	(New Zealand) Michael Thom	All	(New Zealand) Eddie Bell
Holden	Holden Commodore (VX)		99	(New Zealand) Paul Kelly	1	(New Zealand) Roger Townshend
Holden	Holden Commodore (VT)		8	(New Zealand) Mark Wootton	1–2, 5–7	(New Zealand) Brendon Sole
Holden	Holden Commodore (VT)	E-Frame Racing	70	(New Zealand) Andrew Anderson	All	(New Zealand) Rhys McKay
Holden	Holden Commodore (VL)		13	(New Zealand) Brian Friend	2, 5	—N/a
Holden	Holden Commodore (VS)		13	(New Zealand) Murray Lamb	1	(New Zealand) Graeme Fisher
Holden	Holden Commodore (VS)		14	(New Zealand) Maurice Shapley	1	(New Zealand) Tony Rees
Holden	Holden Commodore (VS)		47	(New Zealand) Adam Brook	All	(New Zealand) Kevin Bell
Holden	Holden Commodore (VS)	Steelform Taranaki Steelers	50	(New Zealand) Julia Huzziff	6–7	—N/a
Holden	Holden Commodore (VS)		55	(New Zealand) Grant Shivas	All	(New Zealand) Brendan Price
Holden	Holden Commodore (VS)		76	(New Zealand) Duane Spurdle	1–2	(New Zealand) Dean Cockerton
Holden	Holden Commodore (VK)		23	(New Zealand) Dave Nichols	5–6	—N/a
Holden	Holden Commodore (VK)		51	(New Zealand) Chris Ward	1, 4	(New Zealand) Les Summerfield

== Results and standings ==
=== Season summary ===
Round		Venue	Winning Driver	Winning Team	Round Winner
1		Powerbuilt Raceway at Ruapuna Park, Christchurch	(New Zealand) Mark Pederson (New Zealand) Paul Radisich	Pedersen Racing	(New Zealand) Mark Pederson (New Zealand) Paul Radisich
2	R1	Pukekohe Park Raceway, Pukekohe	(New Zealand) Paul Manuell	Orix Racing	(New Zealand) Paul Manuell
2	R2	Pukekohe Park Raceway, Pukekohe	(New Zealand) Andrew Anderson	E-Frame Racing	(New Zealand) Paul Manuell
3	R1	Teretonga Park, Invercargill	(New Zealand) John McIntyre	Team Kiwi Racing	(New Zealand) Mark Pedersen
3	R2	Teretonga Park, Invercargill	(New Zealand) John McIntyre	Team Kiwi Racing	(New Zealand) Mark Pedersen
3	R3	Teretonga Park, Invercargill	(New Zealand) Paul Pedersen	Pedersen Racing	(New Zealand) Mark Pedersen
4	R1	Timaru International Motor Raceway, Timaru	(New Zealand) John McIntyre	Team Kiwi Racing	(New Zealand) John McIntyre
4	R2	Timaru International Motor Raceway, Timaru	(New Zealand) Andy Booth	Team Kiwi Racing	(New Zealand) John McIntyre
4	R3	Timaru International Motor Raceway, Timaru	(New Zealand) Paul Pedersen	Pedersen Racing	(New Zealand) John McIntyre
5	R1	Manfeild Autocourse, Feilding	(New Zealand) Mark Pedersen	Pedersen Racing	(New Zealand) Mark Pedersen
5	R2	Manfeild Autocourse, Feilding	(New Zealand) Mark Pedersen	Pedersen Racing	(New Zealand) Mark Pedersen
5	R3	Manfeild Autocourse, Feilding	(New Zealand) Andy Booth	Team Kiwi Racing	(New Zealand) Mark Pedersen
6	R1	Taupo Motorsport Park, Taupō	(New Zealand) Paul Pedersen	Pedersen Racing	(New Zealand) Paul Pedersen
6	R2	Taupo Motorsport Park, Taupō	(New Zealand) Paul Pedersen	Pedersen Racing	(New Zealand) Paul Pedersen
6	R3	Taupo Motorsport Park, Taupō	(New Zealand) Paul Pedersen	Pedersen Racing	(New Zealand) Paul Pedersen
7	R1	Manfeild Autocourse, Feilding	(New Zealand) Mark Pedersen	Pedersen Racing	(New Zealand) Mark Pedersen
7	R2	Manfeild Autocourse, Feilding	(New Zealand) Mark Pedersen	Pedersen Racing	(New Zealand) Mark Pedersen
7	R3	Manfeild Autocourse, Feilding	(New Zealand) Paul Pedersen	Pedersen Racing	(New Zealand) Mark Pedersen

=== Point system ===
Points for the 2002/2003 championship are allocated as follows:

Position	1st	2nd	3rd	4th	5th	6th	7th	8th	9th	10th	11th	12th	13th	14th	15th	16th	17th	18th	19th	20th
Points	32	27	23	20	18	16	14	13	12	11	10	9	8	7	6	5	4	3	2	1

=== Championship standings ===
Pos.	Driver	RUA	PUK		TER			TIM			MAN1			TAU			MAN2			Pts
Pos.	Driver	R	R1	R2	R1	R2	R3	R1	R2	R3	R1	R2	R3	R1	R2	R3	R1	R2	R3	Pts
1	(New Zealand) Mark Pedersen	1	2	Ret	4	2	3	9	3	Ret	1	1	7	11	6	10	1	1	11	353
2	(New Zealand) Paul Pedersen	4	8	DNS	14	4	1	14	21	1	7	6	Ret	1	1	1	10	2	1	327
3	(New Zealand) John McIntyre	Ret	9	Ret	1	1	16	1	2	8	3	9	8	2	2	3	16	4	5	321
4	(New Zealand) Andy Booth	Ret	3	15	2	8	5	2	1	11	4	4	1	13	3	21	14	3	3	312
5	(New Zealand) Paul Manuell	Ret	1	3	5	3	9	19	4	2	5	3	4	3	26	5	11	5	16	292
6	(New Zealand) Michael Thom	Ret	6	5	6	5	4	4	5	4	9	11	6	9	5	4	4	Ret	Ret	254
7	(New Zealand) Andrew Anderson	Ret	4	1	3	Ret	2	7	12	6	10	8	3	7	9	7	5	Ret	Ret	248
8	(New Zealand) Wade Henshaw	11	7	4	7	7	Ret	Ret	11	7	12	5	5	4	8	Ret	3	6	4	233
9	(New Zealand) Nick Ross		15	DNS	11	6	8	8	7	9	6	13	10	8	4	2	6	Ret	2	222
10	(New Zealand) Dean Perkins	15	25	2	Ret	DSQ	6	6	8	5	2	2	Ret	21	7	6	2	20	Ret	208
11	(New Zealand) Dale Lambert		DSQ	DSQ	9	Ret	Ret	3	6	3	11	7	11	6	11	8	9	7	6	189
12	(New Zealand) Peter Van Breugel	12	13	9	16	Ret	7	15	14	15	8	12	9	5	10	Ret	7	11	Ret	154
13	(New Zealand) Adam Brook	8	11	13	10	11	15	11	DNS	24	Ret	16	13	14	16	11	12	12	10	132
14	(New Zealand) Brady Kennett		Ret	7	8	Ret	14	13	13	DNS	13	10	2				8	8	Ret	122
15	(New Zealand) Aaron Harris		14	8	18	9	10	12	10	17	16	Ret	Ret	Ret	14	9	17	9	12	119
16	(New Zealand) Phil Stewart	Ret	10	10	17	10	11	DNS	DNS	18	14	17	17	19	22	12	15	13	Ret	94
17	(New Zealand) Kevin Williams		5	Ret							15	15	12	10	12	14	13	10	13	93
18	(New Zealand) Glenn Collins	4	21	22	12	15	12	10	DNS	20	18	14	14	17	15	Ret				83
19	(New Zealand) Bernard Gillon	11	12	14	13	12	Ret	18	Ret	21	28	18	DNS	12	13	Ret	20	15	14	80
20	(New Zealand) Peter Butler	9	16	11	DNS	13	Ret	17	15	13	25	22	15	24	20	Ret	Ret	18	DNS	63
21	(New Zealand) Rob Lewis	6			DNS	Ret	DNS	5	9	10										57
22	(New Zealand) Grant Shivas	10	23	Ret	Ret	Ret	DNS	21	19	16	17	Ret	DNS	16	Ret	13	19	16	9	54
23	(New Zealand) Michael Wallace	Ret			15	14	13	16	DNS	12				15	18	Ret				53
24	(New Zealand) Paul Radisich	1															DNS	DNS	8	45
25	(New Zealand) Andrew Fawcet	13															18	14	7	32
26	(New Zealand) Miles Pope	Ret	17	6							22	21	18	22	17	17				31
27	(New Zealand) Paul Hinton		18	18	19	16	19	20	Ret	14	21	20	19	23	Ret	18	25	Ret	19	31
28	(New Zealand) Dean McMillan		Ret	20	Ret	18	18	22	16	19	19	19	21	18	19	15				29
29	(New Zealand) Paul Kelly	2																		27
30	(New Zealand) Roger Townshend	2																		27
31	(New Zealand) Mike Pero	3																		23
32	(New Zealand) Rick Armstrong	3																		23
33	(New Zealand) Steve Rae	6	22	19																18
34	(New Zealand) Peter Sturgeon	5																		18
35	(New Zealand) Stephen Jones	5																		18
36	(New Zealand) Martin Hicks		Ret	21	20	17	17	23	18	Ret	20	23	Ret				21	17	20	18
37	(New Zealand) Mark Wootton		19	16							Ret	Ret	16	25	23	16	22	Ret	Ret	17
38	(New Zealand) Murray Lamb	7																		14
39	(New Zealand) Graeme Fisher	7																		14
40	(New Zealand) Kevin Bell	8																		13
41	(New Zealand) Kevin Hyde	9																		12
42	(New Zealand) Brendan Price	10																		11
43	(New Zealand) Greg Brinck	12																		9
44	(New Zealand) Wayne Huxford	13																		8
45	(New Zealand) Maurice Shapley	14																		7
46	(New Zealand) Tony Rees	14																		7
47	(New Zealand) Julia Huzziff													Ret	24	20	23	19	17	7
48	(New Zealand) Grant Silvester	15																		6
49	(New Zealand) Chris Ward	16						24	20	23										6
50	(New Zealand) Ashley Hall										23	28	24				24	DSQ	15	6
51	(New Zealand) Duane Spurdle	Ret	20	17																5
52	(New Zealand) Les Summerfield	16																		5
53	(New Zealand) Dave Nichols										26	24	20	26	25	19				3
54	(New Zealand) Graham Stokes										24	26	Ret				27	Ret	18	3
55	(New Zealand) Ken Smith													20	21	DNS				1
-	(New Zealand) Eddie Bell	Ret																		-
-	(New Zealand) Dean Cockerton	Ret																		-
-	(New Zealand) Hamish Cross	Ret																		-
-	(New Zealand) Bill Farmer	Ret																		-
-	(New Zealand) Brian Friend		24	Ret							Ret	25	22							-
-	(New Zealand) Craig Gilbert	Ret																		-
-	(New Zealand) Jason Kerr	Ret																		-
-	(New Zealand) Rhys McKay	Ret																		-
-	(New Zealand) David Parsons										27	27	23				26	21	Ret	-
-	(New Zealand) Richard Pollock	Ret																		-
-	(United Kingdom) Andy Priaulx	Ret																		-
-	(New Zealand) Aaron Slight	Ret																		-
-	(New Zealand) Brendon Sole	Ret																		-
-	(New Zealand) Andrew Talley	Ret																		-
Pos.	Driver	R	R1	R2	R1	R2	R3	R1	R2	R3	R1	R2	R3	R1	R2	R3	R1	R2	R3	Pts
Pos.	Driver	RUA	PUK		TER			TIM			MAN1			TAU			MAN2			Pts

Colour	Result
Gold	Winner
Silver	Second place
Bronze	Third place
Green	Points classification
Blue	Non-points classification
Blue	Non-classified finish (NC)
Purple	Retired, not classified (Ret)
Red	Did not qualify (DNQ)
Red	Did not pre-qualify (DNPQ)
Black	Disqualified (DSQ)
White	Did not start (DNS)
White	Withdrew (WD)
White	Race cancelled (C)
Blank	Did not practice (DNP)
Blank	Did not arrive (DNA)
Blank	Excluded (EX)
