= 2009 Hamilton 400 =

2009 Supercar Championship event

(New Zealand) 2009 Hamilton 400
Event Information
- Round 2 of 14 in the 2009 V8 Supercar Championship Series
- Date: 17–19 March 2009
- Location: Hamilton, New Zealand
- Venue: Hamilton Street Circuit
- Weather: Fine

Results
Race 1
Distance	59 laps	200 km
Pole position	Mark Winterbottom; Ford Performance Racing	1:23.8053
Winner	Jamie Whincup; Triple Eight Race Engineering	1:27:20.3645
Race 2
Distance	59 laps	200 km
Pole position	Steven Johnson; Dick Johnson Racing	1:24.1606
Winner	Jamie Whincup; Triple Eight Race Engineering	1:27:34.7215

The 2009 Hamilton 400 was the second round of the 2009 V8 Supercar Championship Series. It was the second V8 Supercar event to be held on the Hamilton Street Circuit and was held on the weekend of 17 to 19 April in Hamilton, New Zealand.

Jamie Whincup continued his form exhibited in Adelaide by winning both races for the weekend and making it four consecutive race wins to start the season. Mark Winterbottom claimed pole position for the first race and challenged Whincup throughout the race. However, the Ford Performance driver would retire early in the second race. The Dick Johnson Racing team enjoyed a competitive outing with Steven Johnson claiming pole position for the second race. Both he and teammate James Courtney completed the podium later that day.

Whincup's successful weekend saw him extend his championship lead out to 600 points, and over 100 points ahead of nearest competitor, Lee Holdsworth. Additionally, he was rewarded with the Mark Porter Trophy for being the top points scorer of the weekend.

== Background ==
The event was held on the weekend of 17 to 19 April 2009. It was the second V8 Supercar event to be held on the Hamilton Street Circuit, and consisted of two 200 km races with compulsory pitstops in both instances.

The qualifying procedure was changed with a qualifying session to be held for each of the two races, instead of one session for both races.

The winner of the Hamilton 400 event would be awarded the Mark Porter Memorial Trophy, in memory of Mark Porter. Porter, born in Hamilton, died following a crash in a V8 Supercar Development Series support race to the 2006 Bathurst 1000.

=== Entry list ===
There were 30 drivers entered into this event with no changes made from the previous round in Adelaide.

In the coming weeks, Team Kiwi Racing would sell their REC licence to the family of regular driver, Dean Fiore. From the next round at Winton, the entry would be run under the Triple F Racing banner. Thus, this would prove to be the final round in which Team Kiwi Racing would compete as a full-time entrant.

=== Support categories ===
Category	Races	Round winner
New Zealand V8s	3	(New Zealand) Kayne Scott (Ford Falcon (BF))
Toyota Racing Series	2	(New Zealand) Richie Stanaway (Tatuus TT104ZZ Toyota)
Porsche GT3 Cup	3	(New Zealand) Jono Lester (Porsche 997 GT3)
GT1	2	(New Zealand) Bernie Gillon (Jaguar XK (X100))

== Race report ==
=== Race 3 ===
==== Qualifying ====
Qualifying was held on Saturday 18 April, and was split into two sessions and followed with a top ten shootout. Jamie Whincup was fastest in qualifying for Team Vodafone but Mark Winterbottom secured his ninth pole position by just seven 10,000ths of a second. Steven Johnson and Michael Caruso produced unexpectedly good lap to qualify on the second row, particular for Caruso to be the top Holden on the grid.

==== Race ====
Jason Bright changed his engine after qualifying and stalled on dummy grid. Fiore and D'Alberto started from the pitlane. Caruso was slow away from the second row as Winterbottom stormed away from Whincup, Johnson, Tander, Holdsworth, Lowndes and Courtney. Whincup dived into the lead at turn 6 to lead the opening lap. D'Alberto crashed on the third lap at turn 7. D'Alberto restarts but the following lap Murphy and Slade, separately, crashed at the same point. Murphy was out with bent steering. A safety car was called for D'Alberto's car prior to the Nash Commodore restarting.

Perkins spun at the restart trying to avoid Dumbrell. Dumbrell had a spin a lap later, tangling with Van Gisbergen. Pitstops began around lap 20, beginning with Jason Bright. Craig Lowndes was an early stopper. James Courtney and Fabian Coulthard were big climbers through the field before Courtney stopped early on lap 24. Tander stalled in his pitstop and was passed by four cars as he exited.

Lowndes brushed the wall at turn 7 on lap 37, causing him to pit into the garage for mechanical work and rejoined losing some laps. Marcus Marshall also had an engine fail late in the running after clobbering a tyre bundle on the back chicane. Fiore retired after a clash with Cameron McConville, while Ingall slowed in late lap with mechanical problems. A shambolic safety car restart that saw faster cars mixed up with the mechanically wounded cars of Ingall and Caruso caused Courtney to hit the back of Tander's Commodore, slowing both cars in the later laps.

Whincup stormed away at the final restart to win from Winterbottom with Lee Holdsworth continuing his early season good form to finish third ahead of the consistent Steven Johnson

=== Race 4 ===
==== Qualifying ====
The new format for Sunday qualifying made its debut, a return to traditional qualifying methods with all cars on the track together. The session was red flagged late in the session with many of the faster runners caught out just warming up for their final runs at pole after Tim Slade crashed. Steven Johnson was fastest at the time, securing only his second pole position, his previous, Canberra in 2001, also a street circuit. Teammate James Courtney started alongside as Ford dominated the timesheet occupying eight of the top ten position with the only Holdens the garry Rogers Motorsport duo of Michael Caruso and Lee Holdsworth occupying the third row of the grid behind Steven Richards and Jamie Whincup.

==== Race ====
Dean Fiore started from pitlane while Tim Slade's car was too heavily damaged to continue. Johnson ran away from the start to lead while Steven Richards jumped past James Courtney for second as the safety car came out to attend a collision between Mark Winterbottom and the wall. Todd Kelly, being pressured by Jason Bargwanna, then struck Winterbottom. Kelly limped back to the pits while Winterbottom was stranded on the track with broken steering.

Whincup, unable to make progress against Johnson, Richards and Courtney, pitted early to try to get clear air, but it was a slow stop. Johnson slow built up a lead with Courtney moving into second on lap 22. Richards, suffering rear tyre problems, soon succumbed to Holdsworth and Caruso.

By lap 24 leading cars were pitting in numbers. Johnson pitted on lap 26 from the lead. Johnson rejoined behind Whincup but ahead of Holdsworth. Caruso pitted from second on lap 28, stalling briefly, rejoining behind Lowndes and Richards, just ahead of Coulthard. Coulthard claimed a position up the back straight from Caruso. Todd Kelly crashed the wall with steering, already repaired once.

Courtney finally pitted from the lead on lap 32, rejoining behind Whincup, in front of Johnson and Holdsworth. Richards was now holding fifth ahead of Lowndes and Coulthard. Richards spun off track on lap 46, dumping a number of positions. Two laps later Shane van Gisbergen took Rick Kelly off track with an overtaking move gone wrong at the hairpin. Both recovered. Lowndes broke the front left corner of the car, leaving suspension and wheel deranged after clipping the tyre bundle at the back straight chicane. Ingall pulled into the pits trailing smoke with just two laps to go.

Whincup cleared out to win from the Dick Johnson Racing pair of Courtney and Johnson with Holdsworth's fourth position vaulting him past Will Davison into second place in the championship pointscore.

== Results ==
=== Race 3 ===
==== Qualifying ====
Pos	No	Name	Team	Vehicle	Top Ten	Part 2	Part 1
1	5	(Australia) Mark Winterbottom	Ford Performance Racing	Ford Falcon (FG)	1:23.8053	1:23.6730	
2	1	(Australia) Jamie Whincup	Triple Eight Race Engineering	Ford Falcon (FG)	1:23.8060	1:23.6232	
3	17	(Australia) Steven Johnson	Dick Johnson Racing	Ford Falcon (FG)	1:24.0691	1:23.8551	
4	34	(Australia) Michael Caruso	Garry Rogers Motorsport	Holden Commodore (VE)	1:24.0801	1:24.1777	
5	2	(Australia) Garth Tander	Holden Racing Team	Holden Commodore (VE)	1:24.0862	1:23.9327	
6	33	(Australia) Lee Holdsworth	Garry Rogers Motorsport	Holden Commodore (VE)	1:24.1885	1:24.1704	
7	888	(Australia) Craig Lowndes	Triple Eight Race Engineering	Ford Falcon (FG)	1:24.3101	1:23.8543	
8	18	(Australia) James Courtney	Dick Johnson Racing	Ford Falcon (FG)	1:24.4742	1:24.1192	
9	15	(Australia) Rick Kelly	Kelly Racing	Holden Commodore (VE)	1:24.5275	1:24.0438	
10	7	(Australia) Todd Kelly	Kelly Racing	Holden Commodore (VE)	1:24.5789	1:24.1021	
11	9	(New Zealand) Shane van Gisbergen	Stone Brothers Racing	Ford Falcon (FG)	—N/a	1:24.2719	
12	22	(Australia) Will Davison	Holden Racing Team	Holden Commodore (VE)	—N/a	1:24.2794	
13	11	(Australia) Jack Perkins	Kelly Racing	Holden Commodore (VE)	—N/a	1:24.3279	
14	10	(Australia) Paul Dumbrell	Walkinshaw Racing	Holden Commodore (VE)	—N/a	1:24.3472	
15	77	(Australia) Marcus Marshall	Marcus Marshall Motorsport	Ford Falcon (BF)	—N/a	1:24.4468	
16	4	(Australia) Alex Davison	Stone Brothers Racing	Ford Falcon (FG)	—N/a	1:24.5732	
17	51	(New Zealand) Greg Murphy	Tasman Motorsport	Holden Commodore (VE)	—N/a	1:24.7332	
18	39	(Australia) Russell Ingall	Paul Morris Motorsport	Holden Commodore (VE)	—N/a	1:24.7985	
19	25	(Australia) Jason Bright	Britek Motorsport	Ford Falcon (BF)	—N/a	1:34.2732	
20	8	(New Zealand) Jason Richards	Brad Jones Racing	Holden Commodore (VE)	—N/a	1:35.3031	
21	111	(New Zealand) Fabian Coulthard	Paul Cruickshank Racing	Ford Falcon (FG)	—N/a	—N/a	1:24.7554
22	6	(New Zealand) Steven Richards	Ford Performance Racing	Ford Falcon (FG)	—N/a	—N/a	1:24.9339
23	24	(Australia) David Reynolds	Walkinshaw Racing	Holden Commodore (VE)	—N/a	—N/a	1:24.9360
24	3	(Australia) Jason Bargwanna	Tasman Motorsport	Holden Commodore (VE)	—N/a	—N/a	1:24.9723
25	67	(Australia) Tim Slade	Paul Morris Motorsport	Holden Commodore (VE)	—N/a	—N/a	1:25.0216
26	333	(Australia) Michael Patrizi	Paul Cruickshank Racing	Ford Falcon (BF)	—N/a	—N/a	1:25.1275
27	14	(Australia) Cameron McConville	Brad Jones Racing	Holden Commodore (VE)	—N/a	—N/a	1:25.6558
28	021	(Australia) Dean Fiore	Team Kiwi Racing	Holden Commodore (VE)	—N/a	—N/a	1:25.9853
29	16	(Australia) Dale Wood	Kelly Racing	Holden Commodore (VE)	—N/a	—N/a	1:26.1629
EXC	55	(Australia) Tony D'Alberto	Rod Nash Racing	Holden Commodore (VE)	—N/a	—N/a	excluded

==== Race ====
Pos	No	Name	Team	Vehicle	Laps	Time/Retired	Grid	Points
1	1	(Australia) Jamie Whincup	Triple Eight Race Engineering	Ford Falcon (FG)	59	1:27:20.3645	2	150
2	5	(Australia) Mark Winterbottom	Ford Performance Racing	Ford Falcon (FG)	59	+ 1.538	1	138
3	33	(Australia) Lee Holdsworth	Garry Rogers Motorsport	Holden Commodore (VE)	59	+ 2.312	6	129
4	22	(Australia) Will Davison	Holden Racing Team	Holden Commodore (VE)	59	+ 5.565	12	120
5	17	(Australia) Steven Johnson	Dick Johnson Racing	Ford Falcon (FG)	59	+ 8.090	3	111
6	111	(New Zealand) Fabian Coulthard	Paul Cruickshank Racing	Ford Falcon (FG)	59	+ 8.574	21	102
7	15	(Australia) Rick Kelly	Kelly Racing	Holden Commodore (VE)	59	+ 9.864	9	96
8	7	(Australia) Todd Kelly	Kelly Racing	Holden Commodore (VE)	59	+ 11.578	10	90
9	4	(Australia) Alex Davison	Stone Brothers Racing	Ford Falcon (FG)	59	+ 14.119	16	84
10	8	(New Zealand) Jason Richards	Brad Jones Racing	Holden Commodore (VE)	59	+ 15.410	20	78
11	2	(Australia) Garth Tander	Holden Racing Team	Holden Commodore (VE)	59	+ 17.279	5	72
12	24	(Australia) David Reynolds	Walkinshaw Racing	Holden Commodore (VE)	59	+ 17.600	23	69
13	18	(Australia) James Courtney	Dick Johnson Racing	Ford Falcon (FG)	59	+ 18.063	8	66
14	333	(Australia) Michael Patrizi	Paul Cruickshank Racing	Ford Falcon (BF)	59	+ 18.718	26	63
15	6	(New Zealand) Steven Richards	Ford Performance Racing	Ford Falcon (FG)	59	+ 19.622	22	60
16	14	(Australia) Cameron McConville	Brad Jones Racing	Holden Commodore (VE)	59	+ 28.272	27	57
17	9	(New Zealand) Shane van Gisbergen	Stone Brothers Racing	Ford Falcon (FG)	59	+ 39.809	11	54
18	10	(Australia) Paul Dumbrell	Walkinshaw Racing	Holden Commodore (VE)	58	+ 1 lap	14	51
19	11	(Australia) Jack Perkins	Kelly Racing	Holden Commodore (VE)	58	+ 1 lap	13	48
20	55	(Australia) Tony D'Alberto	Rod Nash Racing	Holden Commodore (VE)	58	+ 1 lap	30	45
21	25	(Australia) Jason Bright	Britek Motorsport	Ford Falcon (BF)	58	+ 1 lap	19	42
22	16	(Australia) Dale Wood	Kelly Racing	Holden Commodore (VE)	58	+ 1 lap	29	39
23	39	(Australia) Russell Ingall	Paul Morris Motorsport	Holden Commodore (VE)	58	+ 1 lap	18	36
24	888	(Australia) Craig Lowndes	Triple Eight Race Engineering	Ford Falcon (FG)	55	+ 4 laps	7	33
25	34	(Australia) Michael Caruso	Garry Rogers Motorsport	Holden Commodore (VE)	52	+ 7 laps	4	30
Ret	021	(Australia) Dean Fiore	Team Kiwi Racing	Holden Commodore (VE)	56	Accident	28	
Ret	77	(Australia) Marcus Marshall	Marcus Marshall Motorsport	Ford Falcon (BF)	53	Engine	15	
Ret	3	(Australia) Jason Bargwanna	Tasman Motorsport	Holden Commodore (VE)	44	Retired	24	
Ret	67	(Australia) Tim Slade	Paul Morris Motorsport	Holden Commodore (VE)	17	Retired	25	
Ret	51	(New Zealand) Greg Murphy	Tasman Motorsport	Holden Commodore (VE)	5	Steering	17	
Fastest Lap: Jamie Whincup (Triple Eight Race Engineering) - 1:24.4701 on lap 58

=== Race 4 ===
==== Qualifying ====
Pos	No	Name	Team	Vehicle	Time
1	17	(Australia) Steven Johnson	Dick Johnson Racing	Ford Falcon (FG)	1:24.1606
2	18	(Australia) James Courtney	Dick Johnson Racing	Ford Falcon (FG)	1:24.2377
3	6	(New Zealand) Steven Richards	Ford Performance Racing	Ford Falcon (FG)	1:24.2430
4	1	(Australia) Jamie Whincup	Triple Eight Race Engineering	Ford Falcon (FG)	1:24.2932
5	34	(Australia) Michael Caruso	Garry Rogers Motorsport	Holden Commodore (VE)	1:24.2962
6	33	(Australia) Lee Holdsworth	Garry Rogers Motorsport	Holden Commodore (VE)	1:24.3214
7	9	(New Zealand) Shane van Gisbergen	Stone Brothers Racing	Ford Falcon (FG)	1:24.3568
8	888	(Australia) Craig Lowndes	Triple Eight Race Engineering	Ford Falcon (FG)	1:24.3960
9	111	(New Zealand) Fabian Coulthard	Paul Cruickshank Racing	Ford Falcon (FG)	1:24.4171
10	5	(Australia) Mark Winterbottom	Ford Performance Racing	Ford Falcon (FG)	1:24.4447
11	51	(New Zealand) Greg Murphy	Tasman Motorsport	Holden Commodore (VE)	1:24.4647
12	39	(Australia) Russell Ingall	Paul Morris Motorsport	Holden Commodore (VE)	1:24.4872
13	15	(Australia) Rick Kelly	Kelly Racing	Holden Commodore (VE)	1:24.5692
14	10	(Australia) Paul Dumbrell	Walkinshaw Racing	Holden Commodore (VE)	1:24.6161
15	25	(Australia) Jason Bright	Britek Motorsport	Ford Falcon (BF)	1:24.6622
16	55	(Australia) Tony D'Alberto	Rod Nash Racing	Holden Commodore (VE)	1:24.6660
17	7	(Australia) Todd Kelly	Kelly Racing	Holden Commodore (VE)	1:24.6824
18	8	(New Zealand) Jason Richards	Brad Jones Racing	Holden Commodore (VE)	1:24.7050
19	2	(Australia) Garth Tander	Holden Racing Team	Holden Commodore (VE)	1:24.7090
20	22	(Australia) Will Davison	Holden Racing Team	Holden Commodore (VE)	1:24.7151
21	4	(Australia) Alex Davison	Stone Brothers Racing	Ford Falcon (FG)	1:24.7493
22	24	(Australia) David Reynolds	Walkinshaw Racing	Holden Commodore (VE)	1:24.7151
23	3	(Australia) Jason Bargwanna	Tasman Motorsport	Holden Commodore (VE)	1:24.8507
24	11	(Australia) Jack Perkins	Kelly Racing	Holden Commodore (VE)	1:24.7671
25	333	(Australia) Michael Patrizi	Paul Cruickshank Racing	Ford Falcon (BF)	1:25.2186
26	67	(Australia) Tim Slade	Paul Morris Motorsport	Holden Commodore (VE)	1:25.4154
27	16	(Australia) Dale Wood	Kelly Racing	Holden Commodore (VE)	1:25.5536
28	14	(Australia) Cameron McConville	Brad Jones Racing	Holden Commodore (VE)	1:25.6336
29	77	(Australia) Marcus Marshall	Marcus Marshall Motorsport	Ford Falcon (BF)	1:25.6799
30	021	(Australia) Dean Fiore	Team Kiwi Racing	Holden Commodore (VE)	1:26.0984

==== Race ====
Pos	No.	Name	Team	Vehicle	Laps	Time/Retired	Grid	Points
1	1	(Australia) Jamie Whincup	Triple Eight Race Engineering	Ford Falcon (FG)	59	01:27:34.7215	4	150
2	18	(Australia) James Courtney	Dick Johnson Racing	Ford Falcon (FG)	59	+ 6.032	2	138
3	17	(Australia) Steven Johnson	Dick Johnson Racing	Ford Falcon (FG)	59	+ 8.554	1	129
4	33	(Australia) Lee Holdsworth	Garry Rogers Motorsport	Holden Commodore (VE)	59	+ 9.241	6	120
5	111	(New Zealand) Fabian Coulthard	Paul Cruickshank Racing	Ford Falcon (FG)	59	+ 11.682	9	111
6	34	(Australia) Michael Caruso	Garry Rogers Motorsport	Holden Commodore (VE)	59	+ 12.270	5	102
7	22	(Australia) Will Davison	Holden Racing Team	Holden Commodore (VE)	59	+ 18.055	20	96
8	51	(New Zealand) Greg Murphy	Tasman Motorsport	Holden Commodore (VE)	59	+ 21.331	11	90
9	2	(Australia) Garth Tander	Holden Racing Team	Holden Commodore (VE)	59	+ 21.886	19	84
10	4	(Australia) Alex Davison	Stone Brothers Racing	Ford Falcon (FG)	59	+ 28.582	21	78
11	24	(Australia) David Reynolds	Walkinshaw Racing	Holden Commodore (VE)	59	+ 29.428	22	72
12	6	(New Zealand) Steven Richards	Ford Performance Racing	Ford Falcon (FG)	59	+ 30.636	3	69
13	333	(Australia) Michael Patrizi	Paul Cruickshank Racing	Ford Falcon (BF)	59	+ 32.105	25	66
14	15	(Australia) Rick Kelly	Kelly Racing	Holden Commodore (VE)	59	+ 33.142	13	63
15	9	(New Zealand) Shane van Gisbergen	Stone Brothers Racing	Ford Falcon (FG)	59	+ 48.541	7	60
16	16	(Australia) Dale Wood	Kelly Racing	Holden Commodore (VE)	59	+ 49.053	27	57
17	11	(Australia) Jack Perkins	Kelly Racing	Holden Commodore (VE)	59	+ 1:06.881	24	54
18	25	(Australia) Jason Bright	Britek Motorsport	Ford Falcon (BF)	58	+ 1 lap	15	51
19	14	(Australia) Cameron McConville	Brad Jones Racing	Holden Commodore (VE)	58	+ 1 lap	28	48
20	021	(Australia) Dean Fiore	Team Kiwi Racing	Holden Commodore (VE)	58	+ 1 lap	30	45
21	55	(Australia) Tony D'Alberto	Rod Nash Racing	Holden Commodore (VE)	55	+ 4 laps	16	42
22	8	(New Zealand) Jason Richards	Brad Jones Racing	Holden Commodore (VE)	53	+ 6 laps	18	39
23	10	(Australia) Paul Dumbrell	Walkinshaw Racing	Holden Commodore (VE)	53	+ 6 laps	14	36
24	7	(Australia) Todd Kelly	Kelly Racing	Holden Commodore (VE)	46	+ 13 laps	17	33
Ret	39	(Australia) Russell Ingall	Paul Morris Motorsport	Holden Commodore (VE)	57	Retired	12	
Ret	888	(Australia) Craig Lowndes	Triple Eight Race Engineering	Ford Falcon (FG)	49	Retired	8	
Ret	77	(Australia) Marcus Marshall	Marcus Marshall Motorsport	Ford Falcon (BF)	14	Retired	29	
Ret	3	(Australia) Jason Bargwanna	Tasman Motorsport	Holden Commodore (VE)	11	Retired	23	
Ret	5	(Australia) Mark Winterbottom	Ford Performance Racing	Ford Falcon (FG)	0	Retired	10	
DNS	67	(Australia) Tim Slade	Paul Morris Motorsport	Holden Commodore (VE)		Did not start	26	
Fastest Lap: James Courtney (Dick Johnson Racing) - 1:24.4944 on lap 34

== Standings ==
- After Round 2 of 14

Pos	No	Name	Team	Points
1	1	(Australia) Jamie Whincup	Triple Eight Race Engineering	600
2	33	(Australia) Lee Holdsworth	Garry Rogers Motorsport	498
3	22	(Australia) Will Davison	Holden Racing Team	483
4	17	(Australia) Steven Johnson	Dick Johnson Racing	462
5	111	(New Zealand) Fabian Coulthard	Paul Cruickshank Racing	354
