= Isaac Spackman =

English painter of birds and animals

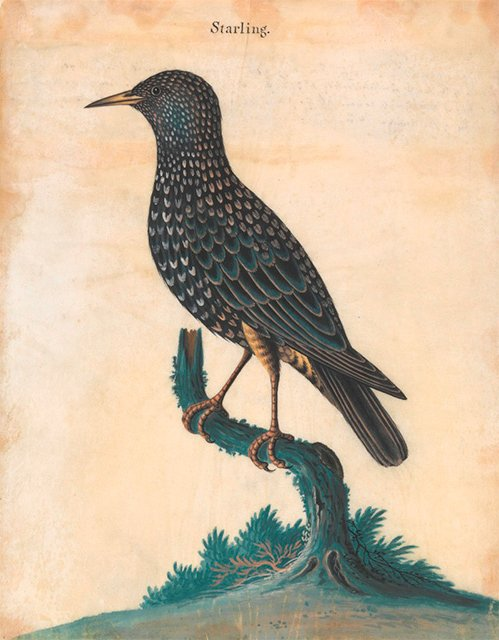
A Starling by Isaac Spackman, undated watercolor and gouache on vellum, Yale Center for British Art

Isaac Spackman (died 1771) was an English painter. He practised about the middle of the eighteenth century, and is best known as a painter of birds and animals. Spackman died on 7 January 1771 in Islington.

His work is in the collection of the Courtauld Gallery, and the Yale Center for British Art.
