= 2003 Australian Sports Sedan Championship =

Motor racing competition

The 2003 Australian Sports Sedan Championship was an Australian motor racing competition open to Group 3D Sports Sedans. It was recognised by the Confederation of Australian Motor Sport as a National Championship and was the 19th Australian Sports Sedan Championship,

The championship was won by Kerry Baily driving a Nissan 300ZX Chevrolet.

== Calendar ==
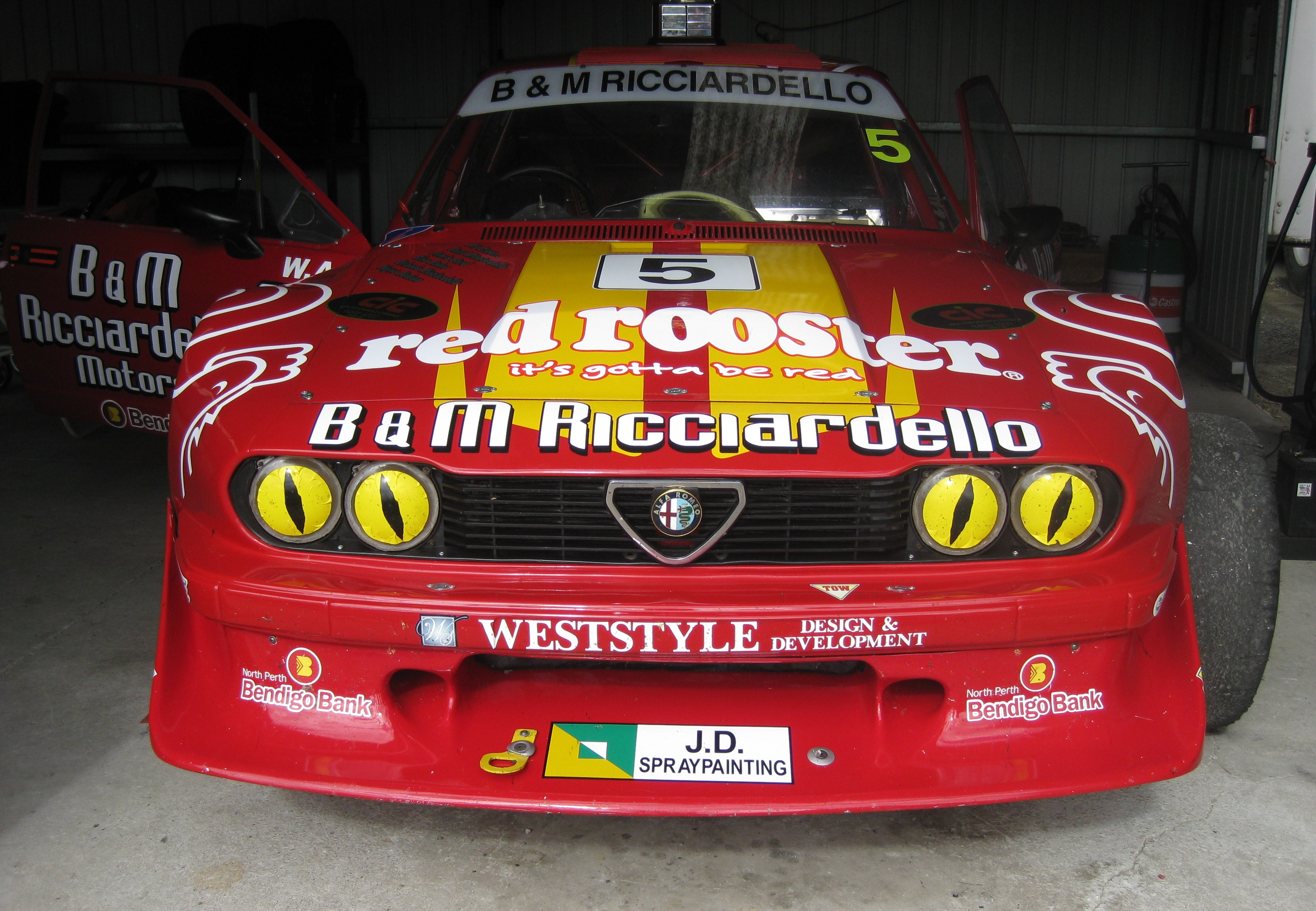
Tony Ricciardello won the 3rd round of the championship driving an Alfa Romeo GTV (pictured above in 2011)

The championship was contested over a five-round series.

Round	Circuit	State	Date	Format	Round winner	Car
1	Wakefield Park Raceway	New South Wales	22 & 23 February	Three races	Kerry Baily	Nissan 300ZX Chevrolet
2	Phillip Island Grand Prix Circuit	Victoria	13 April	Two race	Darren Hossack	Saab 9-3 Aero Chevrolet
3	Mallala Motor Sport Park	South Australia	1 June	Three races	Tony Ricciardello	Alfa Romeo Alfetta GTV Chevrolet
4	Winton Motor Raceway	Victoria	3 August	Two races	Darren Hossack	Saab 9-3 Aero Chevrolet
5	Sandown International Motor Raceway	Victoria	13 & 14 September	Two races	Darren Hossack	Saab 9-3 Aero Chevrolet

Note: Race 2 of Round 2 at Phillip Island was cancelled due to rain

== Points system ==
Championship points were awarded on a 20-17-15-14-13-12-11-10-9-8 basis for 1st through to 10th place in each race and an additional point was awarded to the driver setting the fastest time in Qualifying at each round.

Cars complying with New Zealand Tranzam regulations were eligible to compete in championship races but were not eligible to score championship points.

== Results ==
Position	Driver	No.	Car	Entrant	Wak.	Phi.	Mal.	Win.	San.	Total.
1	Kerry Baily	28	Nissan 300ZX Chevrolet	STS Signs	57	15	47	30	30	179
2	Dean Randle	93	Saab 9-3 Aero Chevrolet	Dean Randle	34	14	31	31	27	137
3	Tony Ricciardello	1	Alfa Romeo Alfetta GTV Chevrolet	B&M Ricciardello Motors	-	18	61	30	21	130
4	Darren Hossack	4	Saab 9-3 Aero Chevrolet	Darren Hossack	-	20	32	40	37	129
5	Rodney Woods	23	Holden VS Commodore Chevrolet	Hallybarton Motorsport	-	8	30	26	20	84
6	Mark Stinson	13	Holden Calibra Chevrolet	AGM Engineering	-	13	26	14	23	76
7	Graham Smith	16	Opel Calibra Fiat Turbo	Speedy Fasteners	46	-	-	20	9	75
8	Des Wall	20	Toyota Supra Chevrolet	Spies Hecker	30	12	-	-	-	42
=	Mick Monterosso	2	Ford Escort Chevrolet	Boffa & Russo Electrical Contractors	-	-	13	-	29	42
10	Phil Crompton	49	Ford EB Falcon	Black Rhino	28	-	13	-	-	41
11	Stephen Vines	77	Ford Cortina	Stephen Vines	-	10	-	21	8	39
12	Ray Ayton	99	Holden Calibra Chevrolet	Reward Insurance	8	-	21	9	-	38
13	Mark Duggan	11	Holden Calibra Chevrolet	Aristocrat, Schweppes, Strongbow	35	-	-	-	-	35
14	David Brenssell	10	Holden VP Commodore Chevrolet	Hancock & Just / Diamond Brothers	-	-	34	-	-	34
15	Trent Young	41	Toyota Levin	Trent Young	30	-	-	-	-	30
16	Charlie Senese	15	Ford EF Falcon XR8 Chevrolet	Charlie Senese	18	9	-	-	-	27
=	Daniel Jameson	45	Jaguar XKR Chevrolet	Campbelltown Frames	9	-	14	-	-	23
18	Stephen Lichtenberger	5	Mazda RX-7 Chevrolet	Habib Brothers Smash Repairs	11	-	-	12	-	23
19	Jeff Barnes	6	Pontiac Firebird Trans Am Chevrolet	Barnes High Performance	22	-	-	-	-	22
=	Bill Martin	36	Mazda RX-7 Chevrolet	Goulburn Workers Club	22	-	-	-	-	22
21	David Thexton	19	Ford EF Falcon	David Thexton	19	-	-	-	-	19
=	Fred Axisa	80	Holden VX Commodore Chevrolet	Austrack Motorsport	-	-	19	-	-	19
23	Michael Robinson	32	Holden VN Commodore Chevrolet	Bell Real Estate	-	-	-	17	-	17
24	Chris Jackson	50	Holden VL Commodore Chevrolet	AM Electrical Contractors	15	-	-	-	-	15
25	Chris Muscat	9	Mazda RX-7	Penrite	-	11	-	-	-	11
26	Robert Smith	72	Holden VS Commodore	Smiths Trucks	-	-	-	-	10	10
=	David Krause	79	Holden VS Commodore	Ron Krause	-	-	-	-	10	10
28	Dean Camm	56	Honda Prelude Chevrolet	Darreds Panels	-	-	-	8	-	8
=	Milton Seferis	96	Holden VS Commodore	Highbury Automotive	-	-	-	-	8	8

Note: Cars complying with New Zealand Tranzam regulations were eligible to compete in championship races but were not eligible to score championship points.
