= Hamilton 400 =

(New Zealand) Hamilton 400
- Race Information
| Venue | Hamilton Street Circuit |
| Number of times held | 5 |
| First held | 2008 |
| Last held | 2012 |
- Race Format
- Race 1
| Laps | 59 |
| Distance | 200 km |
- Race 2
| Laps | 59 |
| Distance | 200 km |
- Last Event (2012)
- Overall Winner
| (Australia) Will Davison | Ford Performance Racing |
- Race Winners
| (Australia) Will Davison | Ford Performance Racing |
| (Australia) Mark Winterbottom | Ford Performance Racing |

The Hamilton 400 was a V8 Supercar motor racing event held on the Hamilton Street Circuit, Hamilton, New Zealand. The event was held from 2008 to 2012, and is one of only three New Zealand circuits to host a championship round of V8 Supercars.

== History ==
The event was first held in 2008, replacing the long running New Zealand V8 International, held at Pukekohe Park Raceway in Pukekohe, near Auckland. The 2008 event was notable for a large qualifying crash between Todd Kelly and Jamie Whincup, ruling the latter out for the weekend. Whincup went on to win the next two years at Hamilton before Rick Kelly won a rain-affected 2011 event. The final year at Hamilton in 2012 was dominated by Ford Performance Racing, with their drivers Mark Winterbottom and Will Davison winning a race apiece.

For 2013, New Zealand's V8 Supercar event returned to Pukekohe Park, and the event is currently known as the Auckland 500.

=== Mark Porter Memorial Trophy ===
The winner of each Hamilton 400 was awarded the Mark Porter Memorial Trophy, in memory of Mark Porter. Porter, born in Hamilton, died following a crash in a V8 Supercar Development Series support race to the 2006 Bathurst 1000. Following the demise of the race, the trophy was moved to a permanent display at the Waikato Museum in Hamilton.

== Circuit ==
The circuit is located in the Frankton business district within Hamilton. For each event, city streets were closed off in the days leading up to the event, with various items of road furniture removed and concrete barriers and a pit complex installed.

== Demise ==
On 30 September 2011, it was reported that Hamilton City Council, the local governing body for Hamilton City where the race is held, chose to opt out of the Hamilton 400, with the final event taking place in 2012. The council accepted a $1.25 million payout from V8 Supercars Australia to renege on the seven-year contract. The event had reportedly been run at a significant loss in 2011, leading to the early-exit offer. Following an audit in 2011 the ex mayor Michael Redman resigned after allegations of unwise spending were proven. The report showed that the total cost to Hamilton was about $40million of which at least $3 million was unauthorised expenditure. The report criticised the city council for being secretive about the massive mismanagement. CEO Tony Marryatt also came in for criticism, despite his defence of the event.

== Winners ==
| Year | Driver | Team | Car | Report |
|---|---|---|---|---|
| 2008 | (Australia) Garth Tander | Holden Racing Team | Holden VE Commodore | Report |
| 2009 | (Australia) Jamie Whincup | Triple Eight Race Engineering | Ford FG Falcon | Report |
| 2010 | (Australia) Jamie Whincup | Triple Eight Race Engineering | Holden VE Commodore | Report |
| 2011 | (Australia) Rick Kelly | Kelly Racing | Holden VE Commodore | Report |
| 2012 | (Australia) Will Davison | Ford Performance Racing | Ford FG Falcon | Report |

== Multiple winners ==
=== By driver ===
| Wins | Driver | Years |
|---|---|---|
| 2 | (Australia) Jamie Whincup | 2009, 2010 |

=== By team ===
| Wins | Team |
|---|---|
| 2 | Triple Eight Race Engineering |

=== By manufacturer ===
| Wins | Manufacturer |
|---|---|
| 3 | Holden |
| 2 | Ford |

== Event names and sponsors ==
- 2008–09: Hamilton 400
- 2010–12: ITM Hamilton 400

== See also ==
- List of Australian Touring Car Championship races
