= Kerry Spackman =

- Spackman in 2010
- Born: 26 June 1956 (age 70); Auckland, New Zealand
- Occupations: Cognitive neuroscientist, author, inventor
- Known for: Work in sports psychology, Formula One driver training, and performance optimisation
- Writing career
- Notable awards: 2010 World Class New Zealand Award for Creative Thinking; 1992 NEEDA Award for Most Significant Electronic Export
- Website: Official website

Kerry Spackman (born 26 June 1956 in Auckland, New Zealand) is a cognitive neuroscientist.

== Life and career ==
Early in his career, Spackman worked with a New Zealand-based physicist to develop electronic equipment to measure the performance of cars. Spackman met the three-times Formula One world champion Sir Jackie Stewart, with whom he later worked to develop a programme to train professional drivers.

He won the 2010 World Class New Zealand Award for New Thinking.

== Books and television ==
- The Winners Bible: Rewire Your Brain For Permanent Change (2009) (Greenleaf Book Group)
- The Ant and the Ferrari (2012) (Harper Collins)
- In television Spackman has written and presented a showcase 1 hour documentary for the Discovery Channel about his work in Formula One called "Speed Science".
