= John McIntyre Racing =

- Manufacturer: Ford
- Team Principal: John McIntyre
- Race Drivers: 47. John McIntyre
- Chassis: Ford FG Falcon
- Debut: NZV8: 2006; Super Tourer: 2012
- Drivers' Championships: NZV8: 3 Super Tourer: 2012
- Round wins: NZV8: 60
- Pole positions: NZV8: 6
- 2010–11 position: 1st

John McIntyre Racing (JMR) is a New Zealand motor racing team that competes in the V8SuperTourer (and formerly in the New Zealand V8s). They currently run a single Ford FG Falcon for team owner John McIntyre.

== History ==
John McIntyre Racing was formed in 2006 by owner-driver John McIntyre. The team enjoyed success in the 2006–07 NZV8 series, winning the championship in their first season. JMR made it two in a row when they won the 2007–08 NZV8 series for the second time.

For 2012, JMR moved to the new SuperTourer championship. The team expanded to two cars, with experienced V8 Supercars driver Steven Richards driving the #556 (later #70).

For 2013, the second license was sold to driver Dominic Storey.
