= Hamilton Street Circuit =

Street circuit in Hamilton, New Zealand

- Street Circuit (2008–2012)
- Location: Hamilton, New Zealand
- Coordinates: 37°47′8″S 175°16′5″E
- Opened: 18 April 2008; 18 years ago
- Closed: 22 April 2012; 14 years ago
- Major events: V8 Supercars Hamilton 400 (2008–2012); Toyota Racing Series (2008–2009)

Street Circuit (2008–2012)
- Length: 3.310 km (2.057 mi)
- Turns: 9
- Race lap record: 1:22.8736 ( (Australia) Mark Winterbottom, Ford Falcon (FG), 2012, V8 Supercars)

The Hamilton Street Circuit was a temporary street circuit in Hamilton, New Zealand. From 2008 to 2012 it hosted the Hamilton 400 as part of the V8 Supercars championship.

From 2010 to 2012, ITM, New Zealand's largest group of independent trade building supplies, sponsored the race and it became known as the ITM 400.

== Demise ==
Some residents of the city wanted the V8s gone, as they took over city streets and blocked residents from entering and exiting their own homes.

On 14 December 2010, The New Zealand Herald reported that Julie Hardaker, the newly elected Mayor of Hamilton, and some councilors appointed an independent auditor to audit the cost of the race. The figures released on 14 December suggested that a NZ$3.5m cost to change the event to a different promoter (the original promoter, Caleta Streetrace Management, was collapsed in 2010), NZ$5.1m for operational costs and NZ$20.3m for set-up costs. The sum (NZ$27.4 million) did not include "commercially confidential" amounts such as event sponsorship payments.

The cost to run the V8 Supercar event was eventually deemed too great and the final V8 Supercar race was held on 22 April 2012; it was won by Mark Winterbottom.

== The circuit ==
Hamilton Street Circuit was 3.310 km (2.057 mi) long circuit ran in a clockwise direction around the Frankton business district with the pit lane and main straight located on Mill Street. The circuit also went alongside the Seddon Park and the Waikato Stadium. It was generally a narrow race track with armco and concrete lined sides but it could be fast and flowing. There were plenty of passing opportunities and those who quickly dial into the contained style of street racing had the most success. The circuit was not very forgiving if the driver got off the racing line because it was surrounded by the aforementioned fences and concrete barriers.

== Lap records ==
The fastest official race lap records at Hamilton Street Circuit are listed as:

Category	Time	Driver	Vehicle	Event
Street Circuit (2008–2012): 3.310 km (2.057 mi)
V8 Supercars	1:22.8736	(Australia) Mark Winterbottom	Ford Falcon (FG)	2012 ITM Hamilton 400
Toyota Racing Series	1:23.0622	(New Zealand) Richie Stanaway	Tatuus TT104ZZ	2009 Hamilton TRS Round
