= Ian Tulloch =

New Zealand racing driver

Ian Tulloch QSO JP
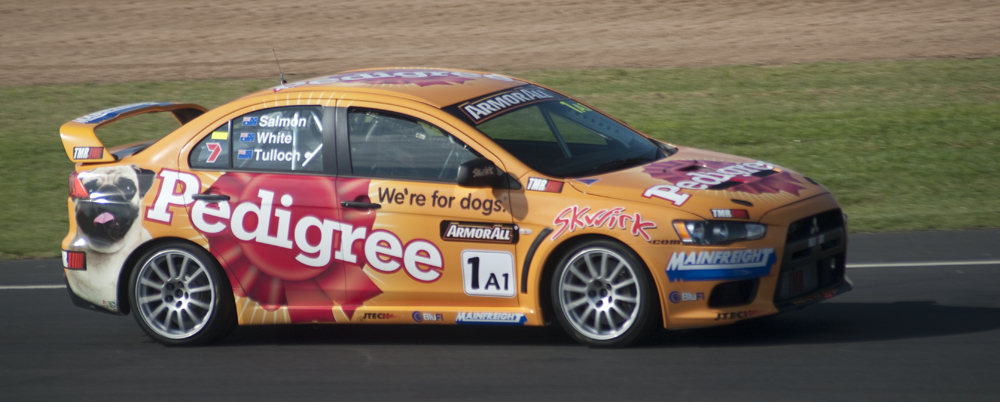

14th Mayor of Mataura
- In office 1983–1989
- Preceded by: Keith Henderson
- Succeeded by: Office abolished

Personal details
- Born: 21 September 1950 (age 76)
- Party: United Future

Ian "Inky" Tulloch (born 21 September 1950) is a New Zealand racing-driver and a former politician in both local and national politics. He is most famous for his career in racing saloon cars as well as for being the last Mayor of Mataura before it became part of the Gore District Council. His father was Malcolm "Mac" Tulloch, a man who had been the Mayor of Mataura twice between 1959 and 1962 and between 1968 and 1970.

== Biography ==
=== Racing career ===
Tulloch's extensive racing career has spanned four decades within which he participated in 119 races. During his career, Tulloch achieved 7 wins and 21 podium finishes. The notable competitions in which he raced were the Australian Production Car Championship, NZ Truth V8s Championship, Parker ENZED NZV8s Championship, and the NZ Production Car Championship. NZ & Australian super trucks.

In 2016 he crashed during a 1-hour endurance race in his Honda Integra clubmans saloon car and was taken to hospital in a critical condition.

=== Political career ===
Tulloch was elected Mayor of Mataura in 1983 and remained in office until the council ceased to exist in 1989. He then served as mayor of Gore District from 1989 until 1995. Tulloch contested the 1996 election for the Christian Coalition and was placed ninth on their party list. He was the first president of the United Future party.

In the 2006 New Year Honours, Tulloch was appointed a Companion of the Queen's Service Order for public services.
