= 2003–04 New Zealand V8 season =

2003–04 New Zealand V8s season

Seasons
- ← 2002–03 2004–05 →

The 2003–04 New Zealand V8 season (known for commercial reasons as the 2003–04 Parker ENZED NZV8s Championship) was a motor racing series for New Zealand V8 touring cars. It consisted of seven rounds beginning on 7–9 November 2003 and ending 27–38 March 2004.

The championship was won by Andy Booth, for the first time in his career.

== Race calendar ==
Rnd	Circuit	Date	Map
2003			2003–04 New Zealand V8 season is located in New Zealand
1	Pukekohe Park Raceway (Pukekohe, Auckland Region)	7–9 November	2003–04 New Zealand V8 season is located in New Zealand
2004			2003–04 New Zealand V8 season is located in New Zealand
2	Timaru International Motor Raceway (Timaru, Canterbury Region)	10–11 January	2003–04 New Zealand V8 season is located in New Zealand
3	Teretonga Park (Invercargill, Southland Region)	16–18 January	2003–04 New Zealand V8 season is located in New Zealand
4	Manfeild Autocourse (Feilding, Manawatū District)	31 January–1 February	2003–04 New Zealand V8 season is located in New Zealand
5	Pukekohe Park Raceway (Pukekohe, Auckland Region)	14–15 February	2003–04 New Zealand V8 season is located in New Zealand
6	Taupo Motorsport Park (Taupō, Waikato)	20–21 March	2003–04 New Zealand V8 season is located in New Zealand
7	Manfeild Autocourse (Feilding, Manawatū District)	27–28 March	2003–04 New Zealand V8 season is located in New Zealand

== Teams and drivers ==
Manufacturer	Vehicle	Team	No.	Driver	Rounds
Ford	Falcon (BA)	ENZED	06	(New Zealand) Brady Kennett	All
Ford	Falcon (BA)	Tracer Motorsport	07	(New Zealand) Craig Boote	All
Ford	Falcon (BA)	Tracer Motorsport	34	(New Zealand) Michael Shepherd	All
Ford	Falcon (BA)	Repco	20	(New Zealand) Haydn MacKenzie	1–2, 4–7
Ford	Falcon (BA)	Pedersen Sheehan Racing	027	(New Zealand) Mark Pedersen	1–2, 4
Ford	Falcon (BA)	Pedersen Sheehan Racing	027	(New Zealand) Paul Radisich	3, 5
Ford	Falcon (BA)	Pedersen Sheehan Racing	027	(New Zealand) John McIntyre	7
Ford	Falcon (BA)	Ballistic Motorsport	30	(New Zealand) Ashley Hall	1–5
Ford	Falcon (BA)	Ballistic Motorsport	31	(New Zealand) David Parsons	1–5
Ford	Falcon (BA)	NZSTT	47	(New Zealand) Adam Brook	1–5
Ford	Falcon (BA)	GT Radial Tyres	75	(New Zealand) Dean Perkins	All
Ford	Falcon (BA)	Mag & Turbo Warehouse	89	(New Zealand) Dale Lambert	All
Ford	Falcon (BA)	Thexton Motor Racing	100	(New Zealand) David Thexton	1–5
Ford	Falcon (EL)	The Car Dealer	18	(New Zealand) Dean McMillan	1, 4–7
Ford	Falcon (AU)	Team Hicks Racing	19	(New Zealand) Martin Hicks	1, 4–7
Ford	Falcon (AU)	Mountain Recording	37	(New Zealand) Jared Carlyle	2–7
Ford	Falcon (AU)	Segedin Truck & Auto Parts	57	(New Zealand) Clark Proctor	All
Holden	Commodore (VX)	Smokefree	8	(New Zealand) Mark Wootton	1, 4–7
Holden	Commodore (VX)	Huzziff Motors	50	(New Zealand) Julia Huzziff	All
Holden	Commodore (VY)	Blackwells Commercial	9	(New Zealand) Rob Lewis	1–2
Holden	Commodore (VY)	Angus Fogg Racing	11	(New Zealand) Angus Fogg	All
Holden	Commodore (VY)	Orix Racing	15	(New Zealand) Paul Manuell	1–2, 4–7
Holden	Commodore (VY)	Team Kiwi Racing	021	(New Zealand) Andy Booth	All
Holden	Commodore (VY)	Team Kiwi Racing	777	(New Zealand) Nick Ross	All
Holden	Commodore (VY)	Strapping Systems	25	(New Zealand) Kevin Williams	4–7
Holden	Commodore (VY)	Mike Pero Racing	28	(New Zealand) Wade Henshaw	All
Holden	Commodore (VY)	Mike Pero Racing	29	(New Zealand) Mike Pero	All
Holden	Commodore (VY)	Radio Sport	38	(New Zealand) Andrew Fawcet	All
Holden	Commodore (VY)	Speedfloor	42	(New Zealand) Phil Stewart	1
Holden	Commodore (VY)	Dynatron	55	(New Zealand) Grant Shivas	All
Holden	Commodore (VY)	Hydraulink Racing	69	(New Zealand) Michael Thom	All
Holden	Commodore (VY)	E-Frame Racing	70	(New Zealand) Andrew Anderson	All
Holden	Commodore (VY)		92	(New Zealand) Daynom Templeman	2–3, 5, 7
Holden	Commodore (VY)	Mark Petch Motorsport	99	(New Zealand) Kayne Scott	All
Holden	Commodore (VS)	First National Real Estate	76	(New Zealand) Duane Spurdle	1, 4–7

== Results and standings ==
=== Season summary ===
Round		Venue	Pole position	Fastest lap	Winning Driver	Winning Team
2003
1	R1	Pukekohe Park Raceway	(New Zealand) Paul Manuell	(New Zealand) Mark Pedersen	(New Zealand) Andy Booth	Team Kiwi Racing
1	R2	Pukekohe Park Raceway		(New Zealand) Paul Manuell	(New Zealand) Paul Manuell	Orix Racing
2004
2	R1	Timaru International Motor Raceway	(New Zealand) Kayne Scott	(New Zealand) Kayne Scott	(New Zealand) Andy Booth	Team Kiwi Racing
2	R2	Timaru International Motor Raceway		(New Zealand) Kayne Scott	(New Zealand) Andy Booth	Team Kiwi Racing
2	R3	Timaru International Motor Raceway		(New Zealand) Kayne Scott	(New Zealand) Wade Henshaw	Mike Pero Racing
3	R1	Teretonga Park			(New Zealand) Kayne Scott	Mark Petch Motorsport
3	R2	Teretonga Park			(New Zealand) Paul Radisich	Pedersen Sheehan Racing
3	R3	Teretonga Park			(New Zealand) Paul Radisich	Pedersen Sheehan Racing
4	R1	Manfeild Autocourse	(New Zealand) Angus Fogg	(New Zealand) Andrew Fawcet	(New Zealand) Andrew Fawcet	Radio Sport
4	R2	Manfeild Autocourse		(New Zealand) Andy Booth	(New Zealand) Wade Henshaw	Mike Pero Racing
4	R3	Manfeild Autocourse		(New Zealand) Andy Booth	(New Zealand) Andy Booth	Team Kiwi Racing
5	R1	Pukekohe Park Raceway	(New Zealand) Kayne Scott	(New Zealand) Kayne Scott	(New Zealand) Kayne Scott	Mark Petch Motorsport
5	R2	Pukekohe Park Raceway		(New Zealand) Paul Pedersen	(New Zealand) Paul Pedersen	International Motorsport
5	R3	Pukekohe Park Raceway		(New Zealand) Dean Perkins	(New Zealand) Paul Radisich	Pedersen Sheehan Racing
6	R1	Taupo Motorsport Park	(New Zealand) Andy Booth	(New Zealand) Andy Booth	(New Zealand) Andy Booth	Team Kiwi Racing
6	R2	Taupo Motorsport Park		(New Zealand) Paul Manuell	(New Zealand) Andy Booth	Team Kiwi Racing
6	R3	Taupo Motorsport Park		(New Zealand) Paul Pedersen	(New Zealand) Wade Henshaw	Mike Pero Racing
7	R1	Manfeild Autocourse	(New Zealand) John McIntyre	(New Zealand) John McIntyre	(New Zealand) John McIntyre	Pedersen Sheehan Racing
7	R2	Manfeild Autocourse		(New Zealand) Andy Booth	(New Zealand) John McIntyre	Pedersen Sheehan Racing
7	R3	Manfeild Autocourse		(New Zealand) Andy Booth	(New Zealand) Andy Booth	Team Kiwi Racing

=== Points structure ===
Points for the 2003/2004 championship are allocated as follows:

Position	1st	2nd	3rd	4th	5th	6th	7th	8th	9th	10th	11th	12th	13th	14th	15th	16th	17th	18th	19th	20th
Points	32	27	23	20	18	16	14	13	12	11	10	9	8	7	6	5	4	3	2	1

=== Championship standings ===
Pos.	Driver	PUK1		TIM			TER			MAN1			PUK2			TAU			MAN2			Pts
Pos.	Driver	R1	R2	R1	R2	R3	R1	R2	R3	R1	R2	R3	R1	R2	R3	R1	R2	R3	R1	R2	R3	Pts
1	(New Zealand) Andy Booth	1	5	1	1	4	3	3	6	4	12	1	7	7	2	1	1	9	3	7	1	457
2	(New Zealand) Paul Pedersen	5	9	5	5	6	Ret	10	4	5	3	Ret	2	1	3	5	3	4	8	3	20	334
3	(New Zealand) Dean Perkins	2	2	4	Ret	5	5	4	Ret	8	5	3	6	6	Ret	4	4	5	7	6	7	318
4	(New Zealand) Angus Fogg	3	3	2	2	2	7	8	15	6	13	18	4	5	4	6	8	3	Ret	8	21	310
5	(New Zealand) Wade Henshaw	7	7	6	4	1	Ret	17	DNS	2	1	Ret	16	10	Ret	2	9	1	Ret	13	8	267
6	(New Zealand) Kayne Scott	8	4	DSQ	DSQ	DSQ	1	2	Ret	11	Ret	Wth	1	2	5	Ret	13	7	4	5	4	259
7	(New Zealand) Brady Kennett	11	26	8	8	3	4	5	Ret	7	2	6	Ret	18	10	3	2	11	9	26	6	256
8	(New Zealand) Dale Lambert	Ret	13	16	12	17	10	15	9	9	6	5	9	8	13	7	6	6	5	4	17	233
9	(New Zealand) Nick Ross	6	8	3	3	14	6	6	12	12	9	4	21	12	Ret	21	15	22	6	Ret	5	213
10	(New Zealand) Paul Manuell	10	1	Ret	Ret	DNS				10	14	10	5	4	Ret	10	5	15	2	2	Ret	199
11	(New Zealand) Clark Proctor	13	Ret	18	20	Ret	11	11	2	13	DNS	8	14	9	6	8	7	2	11	Ret	13	189
12	(New Zealand) Paul Radisich						2	2	1				3	3	1							169
13	(New Zealand) Michael Shepherd	20	14	11	DNS	8	8	9	5	19	16	16	15	16	12	Ret	21	10	13	10	2	163
14	(New Zealand) Andrew Anderson	4	DNS	7	6	13	9	7	3	Ret	Ret	2	Ret	14	Ret	Ret	18	8	Ret	Ret	Wth	157
15	(New Zealand) Michael Thom	9	6	15	9	10	12	16	11	14	8	7	8	11	16	Ret	Wth	Wth	17	19	Ret	149
16	(New Zealand) Andrew Fawcet	12	10	14	Ret	Ret	16	18	13	1	4	Ret	Ret	13	8	Ret	24	21	24	11	10	137
17	(New Zealand) Craig Boote	Ret	25	Ret	Ret	DNS	13	13	7	23	20	14	10	20	7	13	11	18	10	12	DNS	127
18	(New Zealand) Jared Carlyle			20	15	12	Ret	14	14	Ret	10	9	11	24	Ret	9	22	12	12	9	16	110
19	(New Zealand) Michael Wallace	Ret	17	23	13	7	Ret	12	8	Ret	Ret	12	18	19	19	Ret	14	Ret	15	24	11	87
20	(New Zealand) Adam Brook	16	11	9	10	18	Ret	Wth	Wth	17	7	11	13	Ret	Wth							77
21	(New Zealand) John McIntyre																		1	1	9	76
22	(New Zealand) David Thexton	14	12	17	16	16	14	19	10	16	Ret	15	20	28	18							65
23	(New Zealand) Haydn Mackenzie	19	21	22	14	Ret				18	Ret	21	12	15	9	Ret	20	Ret	14	14	Ret	54
24	(New Zealand) Aaron Harris			21	11	9	Ret	Ret	Ret	Ret	Ret	Ret	Ret	21	11	11	10	Ret	25	25	Ret	53
25	(New Zealand) Mark Pedersen	18	DNS	10	7	Ret				3	Wth	Wth										51
26	(New Zealand) Grant Shivas	Ret	23	19	Ret	Ret	Ret	Ret	Wth	15	11	13	Ret	26	14	12	Ret	Wth	Ret	17	Ret	46
27	(New Zealand) Kevin Williams									Ret	17	23	22	22	22	17	17	13	16	15	12	40
28	(New Zealand) Mike Pero	29	Ret	24	22	Ret	19	20	Ret	24	DNS	22	25	27	Ret	14	12	16	19	18	18	32
29	(New Zealand) Peter Butler	22	20							Ret	18	Ret	19	23	17	15	Ret	20	18	16	14	29
30	(New Zealand) Dean McMillan	21	18							Ret	Ret	17	30	32	25	16	16	14	22	Ret	Ret	24
31	(New Zealand) Rob Lewis	23	Ret	12	17	11																23
32	(New Zealand) Miles Pope	17	DNS										17	17	15							18
33	(New Zealand) Julia Huzziff	26	24	26	21	21	17	23	16	22	DNS	19	27	Ret	DNS	22	26	Ret	21	20	15	18
34	(New Zealand) Daynom Templeman			13	23	15	Ret	Wth	Wth				Ret	Ret	20				Ret	DNS	Ret	16
35	(New Zealand) Mark Wootton	24	19							25	15	20	23	25	24	20	25	19	20	23	19	15
36	(New Zealand) David Parsons	28	22	Ret	19	19	18	22	17	20	19	25	24	29	21							14
37	(New Zealand) Ashley Hall	Ret	DNS	25	18	20	15	21	18	26	DNS	24	26	33	23							13
38	(New Zealand) Duane Spurdle	25	15							Ret	Ret	Ret	28	30	27	19	23	17	26	22	DNS	12
39	(New Zealand) Martin Hicks	27	16							21	DNS	26	29	31	26	18	19	Ret	23	21	DNS	10
40	(New Zealand) Phil Stewart	15	DNS																			6
Pos.	Driver	R1	R2	R1	R2	R3	R1	R2	R3	R1	R2	R3	R1	R2	R3	R1	R2	R3	R1	R2	R3	Pts
Pos.	Driver	PUK1		TIM			TER			MAN1			PUK2			TAU			MAN2			Pts
