= 2004–05 New Zealand V8 season =

2004–05 New Zealand V8s season

Seasons
- ← 2003–04 2005–06 →

The 2004–05 New Zealand V8 season (known for commercial reasons as the 2004–05 Parker ENZED NZV8s Championship) was a motor racing series for New Zealand V8 touring cars. It consisted of seven rounds beginning on October 17 in 2004 and ending on April 17 in 2005.

Defending champion Andy Booth would win his second consecutive New Zealand V8 championship after reining in season-long points leader, Wade Henshaw.

== Race calendar ==
Rnd	Circuit	Date	Map
2004			2004–05 New Zealand V8 season is located in New Zealand
1	Pukekohe Park Raceway (Pukekohe, Auckland Region)	16–17 October	2004–05 New Zealand V8 season is located in New Zealand
2	Powerbuilt Raceway at Ruapuna Park (Christchurch, Canterbury Region)	27–28 November	2004–05 New Zealand V8 season is located in New Zealand
2005			2004–05 New Zealand V8 season is located in New Zealand
3	Timaru International Motor Raceway (Timaru, Canterbury Region)	8–9 January	2004–05 New Zealand V8 season is located in New Zealand
4	Teretonga Park (Invercargill, Southland Region)	15–16 January	2004–05 New Zealand V8 season is located in New Zealand
5	Manfeild Autocourse (Feilding, Manawatū District)	19–20 February	2004–05 New Zealand V8 season is located in New Zealand
6	Taupo Motorsport Park (Taupō, Waikato)	12–13 March	2004–05 New Zealand V8 season is located in New Zealand
6	Pukekohe Park Raceway (Pukekohe, Auckland Region)	15–17 April	2004–05 New Zealand V8 season is located in New Zealand

== Teams and drivers ==
Manufacturer	Vehicle	Team	No	Driver	Rounds
Ford	Falcon (BA)	International Motorsport	2	(New Zealand) Angus Fogg	All
Ford	Falcon (BA)	International Motorsport	96	(New Zealand) Paul Pedersen	1–6
Ford	Falcon (BA)	ENZED Motorsport	06	(New Zealand) Brady Kennett	All
Ford	Falcon (BA)	Collins Group Motorsport	10	(New Zealand) Andrew Fawcet	1–2, 5–7
Ford	Falcon (BA)	Collins Group Motorsport	10	(New Zealand) Wayne Huxford	3–4
Ford	Falcon (BA)	Central House Movers	16	(New Zealand) Miles Worsley	1–5
Ford	Falcon (BA)	Repco	20	(New Zealand) Haydn Mackenzie	All
Ford	Falcon (BA)	Pedersen Sheehan Racing	27	(New Zealand) Mark Pedersen	All
Ford	Falcon (BA)	Ballistic Motorsport	31	(New Zealand) David Parsons	All
Ford	Falcon (BA)	Ballistic Motorsport	57	(New Zealand) Clark Proctor	All
Ford	Falcon (BA)	Ballistic Motorsport	58	(New Zealand) Joe Faram	All
Ford	Falcon (BA)	Mountain Recording	37	(New Zealand) Jared Carlyle	1, 3–7
Ford	Falcon (BA)		40	(Australia) Cameron McLean	7
Ford	Falcon (BA)	Super Vault Racing	41	(New Zealand) Adam Brook	1–5, 7
Ford	Falcon (BA)	Tracer Motorsport	47	(New Zealand) John McIntyre	All
Ford	Falcon (BA)	Tracer Motorsport	74	(Australia) Charlie O'Brien	1–2
Ford	Falcon (BA)	GT Radial Racing	75	(New Zealand) Dean Perkins	All
Ford	Falcon (BA)	Shell Helix Racing	77	(New Zealand) Craig Boote	All
Ford	Falcon (BA)	Mag & Turbo Racing	89	(New Zealand) Dale Lambert	All
Ford	Falcon (BA)	Powerbuilt Tools Racing	91	(New Zealand) Shane Drake	All
Ford	Falcon (AU)	Team Hicks Racing	19	(New Zealand) Martin Hicks	3–7
Holden	Commodore (VY)	Orix Racing	1	(New Zealand) Andy Booth	All
Holden	Commodore (VY)	Orix Racing	15	(New Zealand) Paul Manuell	All
Holden	Commodore (VY)	Hardy Racing	4	(New Zealand) Cam Hardy	All
Holden	Commodore (VY)	Concept Motorsport	007	(New Zealand) Nick Ross	1–6
Holden	Commodore (VY)	Orcon Race Team	8	(New Zealand) Mark Wootton	1–3, 5, 7
Holden	Commodore (VY)		8	(New Zealand) Phil Stewart	4
Holden	Commodore (VY)	Rivet	9	(New Zealand) Daynom Templeman	1–5
Holden	Commodore (VY)	Kitchens for Less	12	(New Zealand) Michael Wallace	All
Holden	Commodore (VY)	The Car Dealer	18	(New Zealand) Dean McMilan	1–2, 5–7
Holden	Commodore (VY)	Strapping Systems	25	(New Zealand) Kevin Williams	All
Holden	Commodore (VY)	Mike Pero Racing	28	(New Zealand) Wade Henshaw	All
Holden	Commodore (VY)	Mike Pero Racing	29	(New Zealand) Mike Pero	All
Holden	Commodore (VY)	DVS	33	(New Zealand) Pete Roberts	All
Holden	Commodore (VY)	Pinepac Racing	34	(New Zealand) Andrew Anderson	All
Holden	Commodore (VY)	Radio Sport	38	(New Zealand) Darryn Henderson	All
Holden	Commodore (VY)		42	(New Zealand) Phil Stewart	7
Holden	Commodore (VY)	Huzziff Motors	50	(New Zealand) Julia Huzziff	All
Holden	Commodore (VY)	GJS Motorsport	55	(New Zealand) Grant Shivas	All
Holden	Commodore (VY)	Hydraulink Racing	69	(New Zealand) Michael Thom	All
Holden	Commodore (VY)	Supercheap Auto Racing	99	(New Zealand) Kayne Scott	All

== Results and standings ==
=== Season summary ===
Round		Venue	Pole position	Fastest lap	Winning driver	Winning team
2004
1	R1	Pukekohe Park Raceway	(New Zealand) Andy Booth	(New Zealand) Andy Booth	(New Zealand) Andy Booth	Orix Racing
1	R2	Pukekohe Park Raceway		(New Zealand) Angus Fogg	(New Zealand) Andy Booth	Orix Racing
1	R3	Pukekohe Park Raceway		(New Zealand) Wade Henshaw	(New Zealand) Mark Pedersen	Pedersen Sheehan Racing
2	R1	Powerbuilt Raceway at Ruapuna Park	(New Zealand) Paul Manuell	(New Zealand) Wade Henshaw	(New Zealand) Wade Henshaw	Mike Pero Racing
2	R2	Powerbuilt Raceway at Ruapuna Park		(New Zealand) John McIntyre	(New Zealand) Wade Henshaw	Mike Pero Racing
2	R3	Powerbuilt Raceway at Ruapuna Park		(New Zealand) John McIntyre	(New Zealand) Wade Henshaw	Mike Pero Racing
2005
3	R1	Timaru International Motor Raceway	(New Zealand) Wade Henshaw	(New Zealand) John McIntyre	(New Zealand) John McIntyre	Tracer Motorsport
3	R2	Timaru International Motor Raceway		(New Zealand) John McIntyre	(New Zealand) John McIntyre	Tracer Motorsport
3	R3	Timaru International Motor Raceway		(New Zealand) Wade Henshaw	(New Zealand) Andy Booth	Orix Racing
4	R1	Teretonga Park	(New Zealand) Kayne Scott	(New Zealand) Kayne Scott	(New Zealand) Kayne Scott	Mark Petch Motorsport
4	R2	Teretonga Park		(New Zealand) John McIntyre	(New Zealand) Kayne Scott	Mark Petch Motorsport
4	R3	Teretonga Park		(New Zealand) John McIntyre	(New Zealand) Mark Pedersen	Pedersen Sheehan Racing
5	R1	Manfeild Autocourse	(New Zealand) John McIntyre	(New Zealand) John McIntyre	(New Zealand) John McIntyre	Tracer Motorsport
5	R2	Manfeild Autocourse		(New Zealand) John McIntyre	(New Zealand) John McIntyre	Tracer Motorsport
5	R3	Manfeild Autocourse		(New Zealand) John McIntyre	(New Zealand) Andy Booth	Orix Racing
6	R1	Taupo Motorsport Park	(New Zealand) John McIntyre	(New Zealand) John McIntyre	(New Zealand) John McIntyre	Tracer Motorsport
6	R2	Taupo Motorsport Park		(New Zealand) Angus Fogg	(New Zealand) John McIntyre	Tracer Motorsport
6	R3	Taupo Motorsport Park		(New Zealand) Angus Fogg	(New Zealand) Andy Booth	Orix Racing
7	R1	Pukekohe Park Raceway	(New Zealand) Kayne Scott	(New Zealand) Mark Pedersen	(New Zealand) Andy Booth	Orix Racing
7	R2	Pukekohe Park Raceway		(New Zealand) Mark Pedersen	(New Zealand) Andy Booth	Orix Racing
7	R3	Pukekohe Park Raceway		(New Zealand) Angus Fogg	(New Zealand) John McIntyre	Tracer Motorsport

=== Points structure ===
Points for the 2004/2005 championship are allocated as follows:

Position	1st	2nd	3rd	4th	5th	6th	7th	8th	9th	10th	11th	12th	13th	14th	15th	16th	17th	18th	19th	20th	21st	22nd	23rd	24th	25th	26th	27th	28th	29th	30th
Points	75	67	60	54	49	45	42	39	36	33	30	28	26	24	22	20	18	16	14	12	10	9	8	7	6	5	4	3	2	1

=== Championship standings ===
Pos.	Driver	PUK1			RUA			TIM			TER			MAN			TAU			PUK2			Pts
Pos.	Driver	R1	R2	R3	R1	R2	R3	R1	R2	R3	R1	R2	R3	R1	R2	R3	R1	R2	R3	R1	R2	R3	Pts
1	(New Zealand) Andy Booth	1	1	7	4	4	6	8	7	1	6	4	7	2	2	1	4	3	1	1	1	6	1183
2	(New Zealand) Wade Henshaw	2	2	2	1	1	1	3	3	2	2	2	6	3	3	14	2	2	22	7	6	21	1161
3	(New Zealand) John McIntyre	5	4	Ret	3	2	4	1	1	3	Ret	11	23	1	1	2	1	1	12	3	4	1	1097
4	(New Zealand) Kayne Scott	7	9	Ret	5	5	5	2	2	8	1	1	8	4	4	25	10	9	4	2	2	3	1024
5	(New Zealand) Paul Manuell	4	5	4	2	3	7	6	Ret	10	3	5	4	23	9	19	8	6	6	5	7	Ret	849
6	(New Zealand) Shane Drake	8	12	16	10	11	2	4	6	6	5	6	3	26	10	3	Ret	13	15	11	10	5	777
7	(New Zealand) Mark Pedersen	9	7	1	11	9	3	Ret	20	14	8	7	1	9	Ret	4	6	Wth	Wth	4	3	8	759
8	(New Zealand) Paul Pedersen	Ret	16	8	8	7	8	5	4	9	4	3	5	Ret	21	5	7	4	Ret				643
9	(New Zealand) Dean Perkins	13	11	5	6	6	22	Ret	16	13	Ret	17	18	5	7	6	16	16	9	8	9	4	619
10	(New Zealand) Michael Thom	14	13	12	15	15	13	10	9	5	13	24	16	20	17	12	9	8	5	12	12	10	595
11	(New Zealand) Andrew Anderson	3	3	10	28	20	17	9	8	4	Ret	19	15	28	13	15	5	5	Ret	10	8	13	593
12	(New Zealand) Angus Fogg	11	8	Ret	19	14	11	32	15	16	15	Ret	Ret	10	6	Ret	12	7	2	6	5	2	570
13	(New Zealand) Clark Proctor	Ret	18	9	33	33	19	16	22	18	10	8	9	6	5	8	11	10	3	17	13	9	535
14	(New Zealand) Craig Boote	17	14	14	9	8	12	23	17	21	11	12	13	15	30	11	26	15	10	20	15	11	450
15	(New Zealand) Michael Wallace	18	20	18	18	21	18	15	13	12	9	10	12	19	Ret	18	15	12	8	DNS	21	15	416
16	(New Zealand) Andrew Fawcet	6	6	6	21	23	16							7	15	Ret	Ret	18	11	9	17	7	379
17	(New Zealand) Kevin Williams	16	17	11	14	16	15	11	10	11	16	21	19	13	20	16	13	Ret	17	18	19	14	359
18	(New Zealand) Nick Ross	15	DNS	Ret	12	10	10	12	12	Ret	17	13	10	18	16	13	Ret	17	13				357
19	(New Zealand) Brady Kennett	10	DNS	15	7	Ret	Ret	13	Ret	DNS	Ret	Wth	Wth	14	8	7	3	Ret	Ret	14	11	24	351
20	(New Zealand) Jared Carlyle	Ret	Wth	Wth				14	11	15	14	16	DNS	8	Ret	10	17	11	7	Ret	16	12	335
21	(New Zealand) Adam Brook	Ret	19	17	17	12	9	7	5	7	Ret	Ret	17	27	29	Ret				16	14	28	319
22	(New Zealand) Dale Lambert	Ret	Wth	Wth	13	13	Ret	31	19	24	12	9	11	12	11	9				19	18	16	291
23	(New Zealand) Haydn Mackenzie	20	15	13	22	17	Ret	17	14	19	27	23	20	21	14	26	14	24	14	15	Ret	DSQ	275
24	(New Zealand) Daynom Templeman	DNS	22	20	20	18	Ret	25	18	17	20	15	14	11	12	Ret							208
25	(Australia) Charlie O'Brien	12	10	3	16	19	14																179
26	(New Zealand) Grant Shivas	27	DNS	26	24	24	20	18	30	30	18	18	Ret	25	19	17	21	19	16	22	DNS	25	173
27	(New Zealand) Pete Roberts	22	23	28	26	25	23	22	21	20	21	22	21	24	32	Ret	18	21	21	26	23	22	166
28	(New Zealand) Cam Hardy	25	Ret	22	27	26	25	26	23	Ret	19	20	26	Ret	24	20	24	23	20	21	20	18	158
29	(New Zealand) Dean McMillan	Ret	26	24	25	22	21							16	18	Ret	20	14	18				153
30	(New Zealand) Wayne Huxford							21	28	DNS	7	14	2										146
31	(New Zealand) David Parsons	23	25	23	32	28	26	20	24	26	Ret	29	27	Ret	28	24	22	20	19	24	22	20	125
32	(New Zealand) Darryn Henderson	24	24	21	34	30	24	19	Ret	28	26	32	22	31	Ret	DNS	27	22	Ret	23	28	17	98
33	(New Zealand) Mike Pero	19	27	19	31	Ret	Ret	28	26	Ret	28	30	DNS	17	26	21	19	Ret	DNS				94
34	(New Zealand) Joe Faram	28	28	25	29	27	DNS	24	29	23	23	26	25	22	22	Ret				DNS	32	DNS	74
35	(New Zealand) Miles Worsley	21	21	Ret	23	32	27	Ret	DNS	22	25	25	Ret	Ret	23	23							71
36	(New Zealand) Julia Huzziff	Ret	DNS	Ret	35	31	28	27	25	27	Ret	27	24	Ret	25	20	23	Ret	Ret	28	Ret	23	55
37	(New Zealand) Martin Hicks							30	27	25	24	28	28	29	31	Ret	25	25	Ret	29	27	29	46
38	(Australia) Cameron McLean																			13	Ret	27	30
39	(New Zealand) Mark Wootton	26	29	27	30	29	Ret	29	31	29				30	27	Ret				27	26	26	29
40	(New Zealand) Phil Stewart																			25	24	Ret	13
41	(New Zealand) Brendon Sole										22	31	Ret										9
Pos.	Driver	R1	R2	R3	R1	R2	R3	R1	R2	R3	R1	R2	R3	R1	R2	R3	R1	R2	R3	R1	R2	R3	Pts
Pos.	Driver	PUK1			RUA			TIM			TER			MAN			TAU			PUK2			Pts
