= 2005–06 New Zealand V8 season =

2005–06 New Zealand V8s season

Seasons
- ← 2004–05 2006–07 →

The 2005–06 New Zealand V8 season (known for commercial reasons as the 2005–06 Parker ENZED NZV8s Championship) was a motor racing series for New Zealand V8 touring cars. It consisted of seven rounds beginning on 4 November 2005 and ending 23 April 2006. Andy Booth entered the season as the defending champion.

At the conclusion of the final round at Pukekohe, Angus Fogg was declared the provisional champion after Kayne Scott was penalised 150 points for an alleged testing breach. However, Scott was acquitted on appeal and his points were reinstated. With this, Scott overhauled the points deficit to Fogg and was declared the season champion.

== Race calendar ==
Rnd	Circuit	Date	Map
2005			2005–06 New Zealand V8 season is located in New Zealand
1	Pukekohe Park Raceway (Pukekohe, Auckland Region)	4–6 November	2005–06 New Zealand V8 season is located in New Zealand
2	Powerbuilt Raceway at Ruapuna Park (Christchurch, Canterbury Region)	25–27 November	2005–06 New Zealand V8 season is located in New Zealand
2006			2005–06 New Zealand V8 season is located in New Zealand
3	Teretonga Park (Invercargill, Southland Region)	13–15 January	2005–06 New Zealand V8 season is located in New Zealand
4	Timaru International Motor Raceway (Timaru, Canterbury Region)	20–22 January	2005–06 New Zealand V8 season is located in New Zealand
5	Manfeild Autocourse (Feilding, Manawatū District)	17–19 February	2005–06 New Zealand V8 season is located in New Zealand
6	Taupo Motorsport Park (Taupō, Waikato)	17–19 March	2005–06 New Zealand V8 season is located in New Zealand
6	Pukekohe Park Raceway (Pukekohe, Auckland Region)	21–23 April	2005–06 New Zealand V8 season is located in New Zealand

== Teams and drivers ==
Manufacturer	Vehicle	Team	No	Driver	Rounds
Ford	Falcon (BA)	GT Radial Racing	2	(New Zealand) Inky Tulloch	All
Ford	Falcon (BA)	GT Radial Racing	75	(New Zealand) Dean Perkins	All
Ford	Falcon (BA)	Ballistic Motorsport	4	(New Zealand) Simon Richards	All
Ford	Falcon (BA)	Ballistic Motorsport	98	(New Zealand) Brent Collins	1–2, 4–7
Ford	Falcon (BA)	Powerbuilt Tools Racing	9	(Australia) Luke Youlden	All
Ford	Falcon (BA)	Radio Sport	11	(New Zealand) Darryn Henderson	All
Ford	Falcon (BA)	Haydn Mackenzie Racing	20	(New Zealand) Haydn Mackenzie	All
Ford	Falcon (BA)	Pedersen Sheehan Racing	27	(New Zealand) Mark Pedersen	All
Ford	Falcon (BA)	Tracer Motorsport	33	(New Zealand) Pete Roberts	All
Ford	Falcon (BA)	Tracer Motorsport	47	(New Zealand) John McIntyre	1–4, 6–7
Ford	Falcon (BA)	Tony Richards Motorsport	40	(Australia) Cameron McLean	All
Ford	Falcon (BA)	Adam Brook Racing	41	(New Zealand) Adam Brook	4, 7
Ford	Falcon (BA)	Metalman Motorsport	57	(New Zealand) Clark Proctor	All
Ford	Falcon (BA)	Mag & Turbo Racing	89	(New Zealand) Dale Lambert	All
Ford	Falcon (BA)	International Motorsport	96	(New Zealand) Paul Pedersen	1–2, 6–7
Ford	Falcon (BA)	International Motorsport	247	(New Zealand) Angus Fogg	All
Holden	Commodore (VZ)	Force Motorsport	1	(New Zealand) Andy Booth	All
Holden	Commodore (VZ)	Force Motorsport	15	(New Zealand) Paul Manuell	All
Holden	Commodore (VZ)	Team ENZED Motorsport	007	(New Zealand) Nick Ross	All
Holden	Commodore (VZ)	Hardy Racing	8	(New Zealand) Cam Hardy	1, 3–7
Holden	Commodore (VZ)	Altherm	10	(New Zealand) Andrew Fawcet	All
Holden	Commodore (VZ)	Wallace Racing	12	(New Zealand) Michael Wallace	All
Holden	Commodore (VZ)	Dean McMillan	18	(New Zealand) Dean McMillan	2, 4–6
Holden	Commodore (VZ)	DVS Holden	22	(New Zealand) John Penny	3–6
Holden	Commodore (VZ)	Strapping Systems NZ	25	(New Zealand) Kevin Williams	All
Holden	Commodore (VZ)	Team Versatile	26	(Australia) Shannon O'Brien	All
Holden	Commodore (VZ)	Pinepac Racing	34	(New Zealand) Andrew Anderson	1–4, 6–7
Holden	Commodore (VZ)	Pinepac Racing	34	(Australia) Dean Canto	5
Holden	Commodore (VZ)	Cost Cop	42	(New Zealand) Phil Stewart	1
Holden	Commodore (VZ)	Huzziff Motors	50	(New Zealand) Julia Huzziff	All
Holden	Commodore (VZ)	American Kleaner	69	(New Zealand) Michael Thom	1–2, 6–7
Holden	Commodore (VZ)	Orcon Race Team	88	(New Zealand) Mark Wootton	1, 5–7
Holden	Commodore (VZ)	Mark Petch Motorsport	99	(New Zealand) Kayne Scott	All

== Results and standings ==
=== Season summary ===
Round		Venue	Winner	Team
1	R1	Pukekohe Park Raceway	(New Zealand) John McIntyre	Tracer Motorsport
1	R2	Pukekohe Park Raceway	(New Zealand) Dean Perkins	GT Radial Racing
1	R3	Pukekohe Park Raceway	(New Zealand) John McIntyre	Tracer Motorsport
2	R1	Powerbuilt Raceway at Ruapuna Park	(New Zealand) Kayne Scott	Mark Petch Motorsport
2	R2	Powerbuilt Raceway at Ruapuna Park	(New Zealand) Kayne Scott	Mark Petch Motorsport
2	R3	Powerbuilt Raceway at Ruapuna Park	(New Zealand) John McIntyre	Tracer Motorsport
3	R1	Teretonga Park	(New Zealand) Angus Fogg	International Motorsport
3	R2	Teretonga Park	(New Zealand) Kayne Scott	Mark Petch Motorsport
3	R3	Teretonga Park	(New Zealand) Mark Pedersen	Pedersen Sheehan Racing
4	R1	Timaru International Motor Raceway	(New Zealand) Angus Fogg	International Motorsport
4	R2	Timaru International Motor Raceway	(New Zealand) Kayne Scott	Mark Petch Motorsport
4	R3	Timaru International Motor Raceway	(New Zealand) Paul Pedersen	International Motorsport
5	R1	Manfeild Autocourse	(New Zealand) John McIntyre	Tracer Motorsport
5	R2	Manfeild Autocourse	(New Zealand) John McIntyre	Tracer Motorsport
5	R3	Manfeild Autocourse	(New Zealand) Paul Pedersen	International Motorsport
6	R1	Taupo Motorsport Park	(New Zealand) John McIntyre	Tracer Motorsport
6	R2	Taupo Motorsport Park	(New Zealand) John McIntyre	Tracer Motorsport
6	R3	Taupo Motorsport Park	(New Zealand) Angus Fogg	International Motorsport
7	R1	Pukekohe Park Raceway	(New Zealand) Angus Fogg	International Motorsport
7	R2	Pukekohe Park Raceway	(New Zealand) Angus Fogg	International Motorsport
7	R3	Pukekohe Park Raceway	(New Zealand) Paul Pedersen	International Motorsport

=== Points structure ===
Points for the 2005/2006 championship are allocated as follows:

Position	1st	2nd	3rd	4th	5th	6th	7th	8th	9th	10th	11th	12th	13th	14th	15th	16th	17th	18th	19th	20th	21st	22nd	23rd	24th	25th	26th	27th	28th	29th	30th
Points	75	67	60	54	49	45	42	39	36	33	30	28	26	24	22	20	18	16	14	12	10	9	8	7	6	5	4	3	2	1

=== Championship standings ===
Pos.	Driver	PUK1			RUA			TER			TIM			MAN			TAU			PUK2			Pts
Pos.	Driver	R1	R2	R3	R1	R2	R3	R1	R2	R3	R1	R2	R3	R1	R2	R3	R1	R2	R3	R1	R2	R3	Pts
1	(New Zealand) Kayne Scott	8	4	2	1	1	6	4	1	14	2	1	4	1	7	3	Ret	2	3	2	2	4	1210
2	(New Zealand) Angus Fogg	3	6	10	15	8	9	1	15	2	1	2	3	2	3	4	6	1	1	1	1	DSQ	1131
3	(New Zealand) Andy Booth	4	3	3	5	2	4	5	13	12	7	5	7	4	1	1	DSQ	7	8	Ret	11	15	920
4	(New Zealand) Mark Pedersen	9	5	20	6	6	2	8	4	1	6	3	5	9	17	6	11	Ret	7	4	3	24	898
5	(New Zealand) Paul Manuell	11	7	9	2	3	3	3	2	8	25	11	18	3	2	Ret	3	11	DNS	19	15	9	773
6	(New Zealand) John McIntyre	1	19	1	23	5	1	2	5	6	9	6	1	DSQ	DSQ	DSQ	DSQ	DSQ	DSQ	3	4	3	767
7	(Australia) Luke Youlden	7	8	6	DSQ	12	10	7	6	3	3	4	6	7	6	12	1	Ret	Ret	7	6	Ret	721
8	(Australia) Cameron McLean	6	9	4	22	21	20	6	3	4	15	12	11	10	13	21	5	4	4	11	7	22	719
9	(New Zealand) Dean Perkins	5	1	Ret	24	11	7	Ret	7	10	11	8	8	12	DNS	Ret	2	3	5	15	9	5	684
10	(New Zealand) Clark Proctor	20	DNS	Ret	7	9	24	Ret	11	20	8	7	2	8	DNS	2	14	5	2	8	Ret	10	617
11	(Australia) Shannon O'Brien	13	12	8	9	14	23	13	12	9	13	9	9	20	DNS	8	4	Ret	13	25	26	21	539
12	(New Zealand) Andrew Anderson	12	Ret	12	4	7	5	11	10	5	5	DSQ	13				Ret	Ret	11	9	24	7	516
13	(New Zealand) Andrew Fawcet	15	10	7	Ret	18	Ret	DSQ	17	25	19	19	25	13	11	9	Ret	12	DNS	6	5	2	447
14	(New Zealand) Kevin Williams	Ret	Ret	Ret	11	10	8	9	25	Ret	14	Ret	10	19	18	11	17	6	9	21	18	17	434
15	(New Zealand) Dale Lambert	10	23	5	Ret	24	17	23	Ret	Ret	22	14	12	5	4	Ret	20	16	6	14	10	Ret	412
=	(New Zealand) Nick Ross	18	13	Ret	DSQ	16	14	16	8	18	17	18	23	24	10	7	Ret	8	10	26	22	13	412
17	(New Zealand) Haydn Mackenzie	14	11	17	12	20	18	12	9	11	16	15	Ret	15	DNS	14	8	21	DNS	20	Ret	22	399
18	(New Zealand) Simon Richards	21	20	Ret	13	17	15	15	19	15	12	13	20	27	12	24	7	9	12	24	16	Ret	376
19	(New Zealand) Gene Rollinson	25	Ret	22	14	19	13	22	Ret	16	20	22	17	11	8	Ret	9	17	Ret	13	17	19	346
20	(New Zealand) Brent Collins	17	14	Ret	8	15	11	Ret	Ret	Ret	18	23	14	21	DNS	13	Ret	DNS	Ret	10	13	6	342
21	(New Zealand) Darryn Henderson	DNS	11	15	16	Ret	21	17	20	17	26	17	19	14	DNS	23	13	Ret	DNS	17	14	8	309
22	(New Zealand) Pete Roberts	27	18	13	21	Ret	Ret	21	23	21	23	16	16	23	19	10	10	19	DNS	12	12	16	306
23	(New Zealand) Michael Wallace	16	Ret	Ret	17	Ret	16	19	16	13	21	Ret	26	16	9	10	Ret	13	18	18	19	14	300
24	(New Zealand) Inky Tulloch	22	16	14	18	26	26	20	21	19	27	Wth	Wth	26	14	18	16	22	15	16	20	11	295
25	(New Zealand) Paul Pedersen	2	2	21	Ret	27	DNS	DSQ	DSQ	DSQ	DSQ	DSQ	DSQ	DSQ	DSQ	DSQ	DSQ	DSQ	DSQ	5	8	1	283
26	(New Zealand) Jason Liefting	Ret	Ret	16	10	13	12	10	14	Ret	10	10	15	17	DNS	Ret	DNS	Ret	DNS				174
27	(New Zealand) Cam Hardy	23	Ret	Wth				DSQ	Ret	23	29	24	22	18	15	19	12	10	14	DNS	Ret	Ret	167
28	(New Zealand) Julia Huzziff	24	21	Ret	19	23	25	DNS	24	22	30	Ret	24	28	DNS	16	19	18	16	23	Ret	Wth	164
29	(New Zealand) John Penny							18	22	24	24	20	21	Ret	16	17	18	15	17				158
30	(New Zealand) Michael Thom	19	15	11	Ret	25	20										15	Ret	Ret	Ret	21	12	148
31	(Australia) Dean Canto													6	5	5							143
32	(New Zealand) Dean McMillan				20	22	22				28	21	26	22	DNS	15	21	14	DNS				140
33	(New Zealand) Mark Wootton	28	22	19										25	Ret	22	22	20	Ret	27	25	20	110
34	(New Zealand) Phil Stewart	26	Ret	18																			21
35	(New Zealand) Adam Brook				3	4	Ret	14	18	7	4	Wth	Wth							22	23	18	13
Pos.	Driver	R1	R2	R3	R1	R2	R3	R1	R2	R3	R1	R2	R3	R1	R2	R3	R1	R2	R3	R1	R2	R3	Pts
Pos.	Driver	PUK1			RUA			TER			TIM			MAN			TAU			PUK2			Pts
