= 2006–07 New Zealand V8 season =

2006–07 New Zealand V8s season

Seasons
- ← 2005–06 2007–08 →

The 2006–07 New Zealand V8 season (known for commercial reasons as the 2006–07 Parker ENZED NZV8s Championship) was a motor racing series for New Zealand V8 touring cars. It consisted of seven rounds, beginning at Pukekohe Park Raceway on 3 November 2006 and ending at the same venue on 22 April 2007.

Kayne Scott entered the season as the defending champion and was in contention to retain his title throughout the entire season. However, long-time points leader John McIntyre would hold on to secure his first New Zealand V8 Touring Car championship.

== Race calendar ==
Rnd	Circuit	Date	Map
2006			2006–07 New Zealand V8 season is located in New Zealand
1	Pukekohe Park Raceway (Pukekohe, Auckland Region)	3–5 November	2006–07 New Zealand V8 season is located in New Zealand
2	Powerbuilt Raceway at Ruapuna Park (Christchurch, Canterbury Region)	24–26 November	2006–07 New Zealand V8 season is located in New Zealand
2007			2006–07 New Zealand V8 season is located in New Zealand
3	Taupo Motorsport Park (Taupō, Waikato)	19–21 January	2006–07 New Zealand V8 season is located in New Zealand
4	Manfeild Autocourse (Feilding, Manawatū District)	16–18 February	2006–07 New Zealand V8 season is located in New Zealand
5	Timaru International Motor Raceway (Timaru, Canterbury Region)	2–4 March	2006–07 New Zealand V8 season is located in New Zealand
6	Teretonga Park (Invercargill, Southland Region)	9–11 March	2006–07 New Zealand V8 season is located in New Zealand
7	Pukekohe Park Raceway (Pukekohe, Auckland Region)	20–22 April	2006–07 New Zealand V8 season is located in New Zealand

== Teams and drivers ==
Manufacturer	Vehicle	Team	No	Driver	Rounds
Ford	Falcon (BF)	Tulloch Motorsport	2	(New Zealand) Inky Tulloch	All
Ford	Falcon (BF)	Tony Richards Motorsport	4	(New Zealand) Simon Richards	All
Ford	Falcon (BF)	Tony Richards Motorsport	40	(Australia) Cameron McLean	All
Ford	Falcon (BF)	Powerbuilt Racing Team	9	(Australia) Luke Youlden	All
Ford	Falcon (BF)	Collins Group Motorsport	10	(New Zealand) Andrew Fawcet	All
Ford	Falcon (BF)	Haydn Mackenzie Motorsport	20	(New Zealand) Haydn Mackenzie	All
Ford	Falcon (BF)	Edgell Performance Racing	26	(New Zealand) Tim Edgell	All
Ford	Falcon (BF)	Pedersen Sheehan Racing	27	(New Zealand) Mark Pedersen	All
Ford	Falcon (BF)	Versatile Homes Racing	41	(New Zealand) Adam Brook	2, 5–6
Ford	Falcon (BF)	John McIntyre Racing	47	(New Zealand) John McIntyre	All
Ford	Falcon (BF)	Hydraulink Racing	48	(Australia) David Besnard	All
Ford	Falcon (BF)		50	(New Zealand) Gene Rollinson	3–4, 7
Ford	Falcon (BF)	Metalman Motorsport	57	(New Zealand) Clark Proctor	All
Ford	Falcon (BF)		66	(New Zealand) Colin Corkery	3–4, 7
Ford	Falcon (BF)	GT Radial Racing	75	(New Zealand) Dean Perkins	All
Ford	Falcon (BF)		89	(New Zealand) Dale Lambert	1–3, 7
Ford	Falcon (BF)	International Motorsport	96	(New Zealand) Paul Pedersen	All
Ford	Falcon (BF)	International Motorsport	247	(New Zealand) Angus Fogg	All
Holden	Commodore (VY)	Mark Petch Motorsport	1	(New Zealand) Kayne Scott	All
Holden	Commodore (VY)	AV8 Motorsport	3	(New Zealand) Andy Booth	All
Holden	Commodore (VY)	Steel Sheds R' Us	5	(Australia) Shaun Richardson	1–4, 7
Holden	Commodore (VY)		6	(New Zealand) Ian Spurle	1–4, 6–7
Holden	Commodore (VY)	Nick Ross Racing	007	(New Zealand) Nick Ross	All
Holden	Commodore (VY)	G&M Autospares	8	(New Zealand) Cam Hardy	All
Holden	Commodore (VY)	Radio Sport	11	(New Zealand) Darryn Henderson	All
Holden	Commodore (VY)	Kitchens 4 Less / Yunca	12	(New Zealand) Michael Wallace	All
Holden	Commodore (VY)	Orix Racing	15	(New Zealand) Paul Manuell	All
Holden	Commodore (VY)		16	(New Zealand) Rod Pratt	7
Holden	Commodore (VY)	Penny Homes Racing	22	(New Zealand) John Penny	1, 3–7
Holden	Commodore (VY)	Strapping Systems NZ	25	(New Zealand) Kevin Williams	All
Holden	Commodore (VY)		33	(New Zealand) Pete Roberts	All
Holden	Commodore (VY)	Huzziff Motors	50	(New Zealand) Julia Huzziff	1
Holden	Commodore (VY)	Mastertrade / Buteline	51	(New Zealand) Chris Adams	7
Holden	Commodore (VY)	Pinepac Racing	70	(New Zealand) Andrew Anderson	All

== Results and standings ==
=== Season summary ===
Round		Venue	Pole position	Fastest lap	Winning Driver	Winning Team
2006
1	R1	Pukekohe Park Raceway	(New Zealand) Angus Fogg	(Australia) David Besnard	(New Zealand) John McIntyre	John McIntyre Racing
1	R2	Pukekohe Park Raceway		(New Zealand) Angus Fogg	(Australia) David Besnard	Hydraulink Racing
1	R3	Pukekohe Park Raceway		(Australia) David Besnard	(Australia) David Besnard	Hydraulink Racing
2	R1	Powerbuilt Raceway at Ruapuna Park	(New Zealand) Kayne Scott	(New Zealand) Angus Fogg	(New Zealand) Angus Fogg	International Motorsport
2	R2	Powerbuilt Raceway at Ruapuna Park		(Australia) David Besnard	(Australia) David Besnard	Hydraulink Racing
2	R3	Powerbuilt Raceway at Ruapuna Park		(Australia) David Besnard	(New Zealand) Kayne Scott	Mark Petch Motorsport
2007
3	R1	Taupo Motorsport Park	(New Zealand) Paul Pedersen	(New Zealand) Kayne Scott	(New Zealand) John McIntyre	John McIntyre Racing
3	R2	Taupo Motorsport Park		(New Zealand) Kayne Scott	(New Zealand) John McIntyre	John McIntyre Racing
3	R3	Taupo Motorsport Park		(Australia) David Besnard	(Australia) David Besnard	Hydraulink Racing
4	R1	Manfeild Autocourse	(New Zealand) Kayne Scott	(Australia) David Besnard	(New Zealand) Angus Fogg	International Motorsport
4	R2	Manfeild Autocourse		(New Zealand) Angus Fogg	(New Zealand) Angus Fogg	International Motorsport
4	R3	Manfeild Autocourse		(New Zealand) Kayne Scott	(New Zealand) Mark Pedersen	Pedersen Sheehan Racing
5	R1	Timaru International Motor Raceway	(New Zealand) John McIntyre	(New Zealand) John McIntyre	(New Zealand) John McIntyre	John McIntyre Racing
5	R2	Timaru International Motor Raceway		(New Zealand) Kayne Scott	(New Zealand) Andy Booth	AV8 Motorsport
5	R3	Timaru International Motor Raceway		(New Zealand) Kayne Scott	(New Zealand) Kayne Scott	Mark Petch Motorsport
6	R1	Teretonga Park	(New Zealand) Kayne Scott	(Australia) David Besnard	(New Zealand) Kayne Scott	Mark Petch Motorsport
6	R2	Teretonga Park		(New Zealand) John McIntyre	(New Zealand) John McIntyre	John McIntyre Racing
6	R3	Teretonga Park		(New Zealand) Andy Booth	(Australia) David Besnard	Hydraulink Racing
7	R1	Pukekohe Park Raceway	(New Zealand) Kayne Scott	(New Zealand) Kayne Scott	(New Zealand) Kayne Scott	Mark Petch Motorsport
7	R2	Pukekohe Park Raceway		(New Zealand) Angus Fogg	(New Zealand) Angus Fogg	International Motorsport
7	R3	Pukekohe Park Raceway		(New Zealand) Angus Fogg	(New Zealand) Angus Fogg	International Motorsport

=== Championship standings ===
Pos	Driver	PUK1			RUA			TAU			MAN			TIM			TER			PUK2			Pts
Pos	Driver	R1	R2	R3	R1	R2	R3	R1	R2	R3	R1	R2	R3	R1	R2	R3	R1	R2	R3	R1	R2	R3	Pts
1	(New Zealand) John McIntyre	1	4	6	3	4	5	1	1	25	4	4	12	**1**	2	11	4	1	8	3	3	6	1104
2	(New Zealand) Kayne Scott	24	23	2	**2**	3	1	3	2	4	**2**	3	4	DNS	8	1	**1**	3	Ret	**1**	1	5	1095
3	(New Zealand) Angus Fogg	**12**	2	7	1	2	13	4	10	2	1	1	16	4	3	24	3	7	13	11	2	1	1006
4	(Australia) David Besnard	2	1	1	9	1	17	5	Ret	1	3	2	Ret	3	4	23	5	2	1	5	Ret	22	917
5	(New Zealand) Clark Proctor	6	8	8	8	5	6	7	5	11	18	17	2	11	23	3	6	Ret	19	27	9	9	715
6	(New Zealand) Andy Booth	23	10	3	Ret	20	7	18	4	9	5	11	14	2	1	22	2	Ret	11	2	4	Ret	692
7	(New Zealand) Paul Manuell	4	6	Ret	7	Ret	2	6	24	Ret	23	6	9	23	6	9	10	22	3	10	7	4	658
8	(New Zealand) Dean Perkins	5	7	9	14	7	4	22	7	Ret	6	10	17	20	9	12	24	15	6	17	29	2	640
9	(Australia) Luke Youlden	3	3	18	4	6	Ret	Ret	9	3	7	5	7	DNS	Ret	19	7	5	12	7	30	21	610
10	(New Zealand) Paul Pedersen	21	11	Ret	5	19	Ret	**2**	3	6	14	7	24	7	7	10	11	4	Ret	4	10	8	547
11	(Australia) Cameron McLean	22	5	20	6	Ret	11	10	6	22	15	24	3	12	19	Ret	12	16	7	9	12	12	508
12	(New Zealand) Darryn Henderson	25	14	5	23	10	18	14	DNS	10	13	14	13	15	16	8	25	10	22	6	6	Ret	493
13	(New Zealand) Mark Pedersen	7	9	4	Ret	9	8	Ret	19	5	Ret	27	1	8	21	6	13	23	Ret	Ret	DNS	DNS	479
14	(New Zealand) Pete Roberts	10	13	Ret	11	8	12	19	13	16	9	9	Ret	13	13	9	16	13	Ret	13	18	16	472
15	(New Zealand) Haydn Mackenzie	9	12	12	15	15	15	12	12	20	16	12	19	18	12	17	Ret	14	5	20	17	Ret	459
15	(New Zealand) Andrew Fawcet	8	20	Ret	10	13	Ret	9	14	Ret	10	21	21	10	15	18	23	6	16	8	5	20	459
17	(New Zealand) Nick Ross	Ret	Ret	Ret	20	11	3	11	15	17	12	8	23	21	14	5	8	Ret	9	15	15	Ret	451
18	(New Zealand) Michael Wallace	11	21	14	18	16	14	24	20	12	22	28	6	16	Ret	2	17	17	20	14	23	11	428
18	(New Zealand) Simon Richards	Ret	15	11	16	14	9	17	11	24	20	18	20	14	17	13	19	11	14	19	21	10	428
20	(New Zealand) Tim Edgell	16	18	13	19	Ret	DNS	21	16	14	17	15	11	22	11	16	14	9	17	12	13	18	372
21	(New Zealand) Andrew Anderson	Ret	16	10	17	18	DNS	8	8	13	24	23	Ret	5	6	14	9	Ret	Ret	28	8	Ret	363
22	(New Zealand) Kevin Williams	14	19	15	24	Ret	DNS	DNS	27	7	26	26	8	23	20	4	21	18	4	22	19	19	299
23	(New Zealand) Ian Tulloch	15	Ret	17	25	21	Ret	15	23	21	27	16	10	DSQ	22	21	22	12	15	21	11	15	245
24	(New Zealand) Cam Hardy	19	24	Ret	Ret	Ret	10	25	17	18	19	22	22	17	18	20	18	19	10	16	16	Ret	239
25	(New Zealand) Adam Brook				12	22	Ret							9	10	7	15	8	21				219
26	(New Zealand) John Penny	17	22	19				Ret	DSQ	Ret	8	25	5	19	24	DNS	20	21	2	18	14	Ret	199
27	(New Zealand) Gene Rollinson							Ret	21	8	11	13	15							Ret	22	7	175
28	(New Zealand) Ian Spurle	Ret	DNS	DNS	13	17	Ret	20	22	15	Ret	19	Ret				Ret	20	18	24	20	13	174
29	(New Zealand) Colin Corkery							13	25	19	21	20	18							Ret	27	3	156
30	(New Zealand) Dale Lambert	13	17	Ret	22	12	16	16	18	Ret										25	28	14	131
31	(New Zealand) Julia Huzziff	18	25	16																			42
32	(New Zealand) Chris Adams																			23	24	17	33
33	(New Zealand) Rod Pratt																			26	26	DNS	10
34	(Australia) Shaun Richardson	20	26	Ret	21	Ret	Ret	23	26	23	25	DNS	DNS							Ret	25	Ret	-36
Pos	Driver	R1	R2	R3	R1	R2	R3	R1	R2	R3	R1	R2	R3	R1	R2	R3	R1	R2	R3	R1	R2	R3	Pts
Pos	Driver	PUK1			RUA			TAU			MAN			TIM			TER			PUK2			Pts

Colour	Result
Gold	Winner
Silver	Second place
Bronze	Third place
Green	Points classification
Blue	Non-points classification
Blue	Non-classified finish (NC)
Purple	Retired, not classified (Ret)
Red	Did not qualify (DNQ)
Red	Did not pre-qualify (DNPQ)
Black	Disqualified (DSQ)
White	Did not start (DNS)
White	Withdrew (WD)
White	Race cancelled (C)
Blank	Did not practice (DNP)
Blank	Did not arrive (DNA)
Blank	Excluded (EX)

**Bold** - Pole position
Italics - Fastest lap
