= 2001 Boost Mobile V8 International =

Twelfth round of the 2001 Shell Championship Series

(New Zealand) 2001 Boost Mobile V8 International
Event Information
- Round 12 of 13 in the 2001 Shell Championship Series
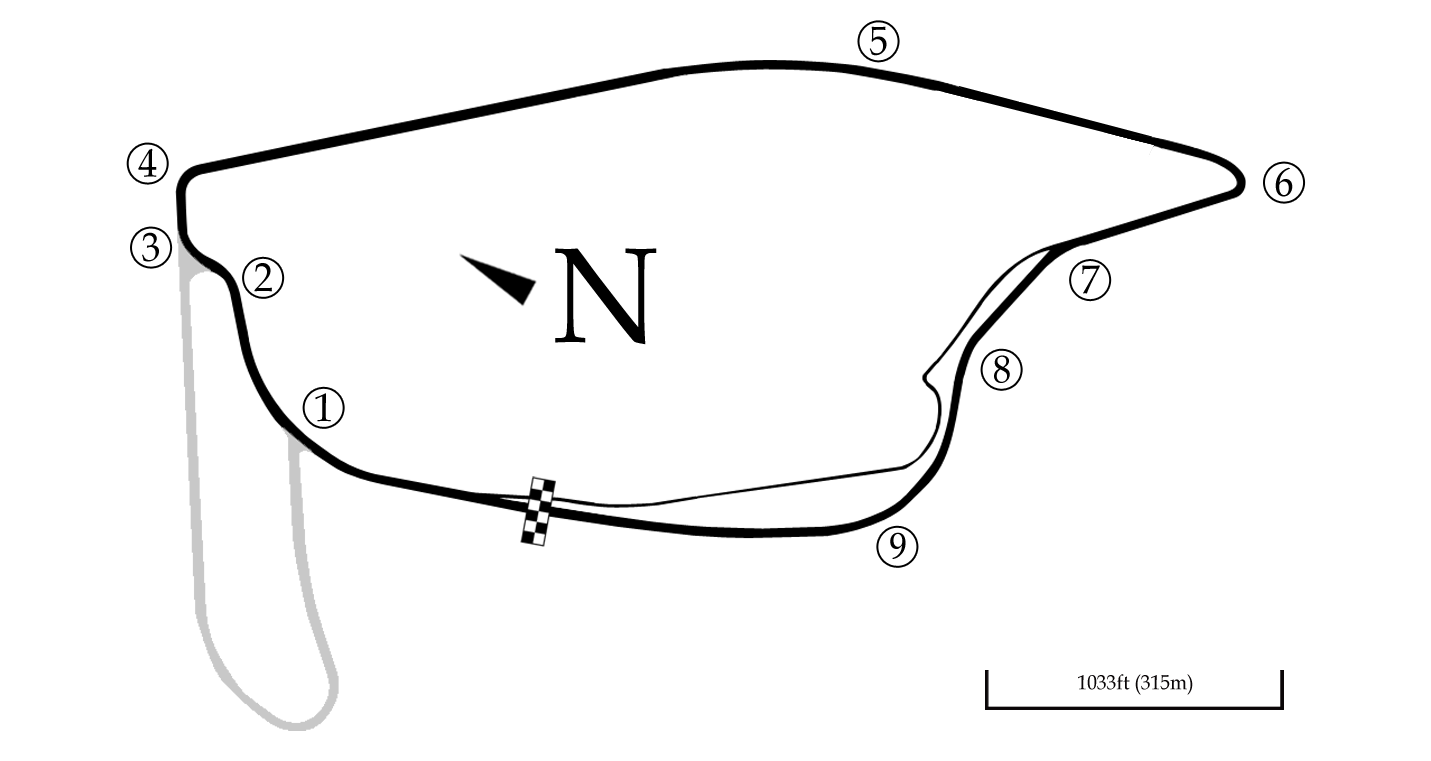
- Date: 9–11 November 2001
- Location: Pukekohe, New Zealand
- Venue: Pukekohe Park Raceway
- Weather: Friday: Overcast; Saturday: Overcast, Heavy rain Sunday: Sunny

Results
Race 1
Distance	31 laps	87 km
Pole position	(New Zealand) Greg Murphy; Tom Walkinshaw Racing Australia	56.9052
Winner	(New Zealand) Greg Murphy; Tom Walkinshaw Racing Australia	32:40.8068
Race 2
Distance	36 laps	100 km
Winner	(New Zealand) Greg Murphy; Tom Walkinshaw Racing Australia	35:57.9519
Race 3
Distance	36 laps	100 km
Winner	(New Zealand) Greg Murphy; Tom Walkinshaw Racing Australia	39:47.0899
Round Results
First	(New Zealand) Greg Murphy; Tom Walkinshaw Racing Australia	288 pts
Second	(Australia) Mark Skaife; Holden Racing Team	240 pts
Third	(Australia) Marcos Ambrose; Stone Brothers Racing	232 pts

The 2001 Boost Mobile V8 International was the twelfth round of the 2001 Shell Championship Series. This was the first V8 Supercar event in New Zealand since the 1996 Mobil New Zealand Sprints and the first time as part of the official calendar. It was held on the weekend of 9 to 11 November at Pukekohe Park Raceway in New Zealand.

In this event, Greg Murphy dominated the weekend at Pukekohe, grabbing three race wins from three and entered the weekend with high expectations. After grabbing provisional pole position, he went on to convert that into a top-ten shootout pole – a first for the 2001 season. The first race was marred due to torrential downpour that resulted in the race being red flagged and ultimately ended prematurely. Shortly thereafter, Mark Larkham was erroneously declared the winner despite the notable handicap of having retired from the race before said red flag was shown. After an appeal from Murphy's team, the Kiwi was declared the winner less than 24 hours later.

Mark Skaife would also clinch his fourth Australian Touring Car championship with a round to spare after title rival Russell Ingall experienced a difficult weekend.

== Background ==
The 2001 Boost Mobile V8 International heralded the first ever overseas championship event for the V8 Supercar series, although it was not the first time that V8 Supercar racing was held at the Pukekohe Park Raceway. In 1996, the Mobil New Zealand Sprints saw the V8 Supercars come across the ditch for the first time, although these events were not part of the 1996 Australian Touring Car Championship calendar.

Skaife entered the round with a chance to clinch the championship with one round to spare. His title rival, Ingall, was still in with an outside chance should Skaife had run into troubles throughout the weekend. Although with 455 points between the two drivers, and only 576 maximum for the last two rounds, Skaife was the overwhelming favourite to retain his crown.

Owing to internal disputes, Briggs Motorsport announced that John Bowe would be replaced for the final two rounds by his endurance co-driver and newly-crowned Konica V8 Supercar champion, Simon Wills. Angus Fogg would return to the series in his first solo appearance since the Clipsal 500.

Wills' inclusion on the grid meant that the inaugural New Zealand championship event would have seven Kiwi drivers competing. Others included Murphy, Fogg, Jason Richards, Steven Richards, Paul Radisich and John Faulkner. Along with the drivers, this event marked the first 'home' event for the New Zealand-based team, Team Kiwi Racing.

== Race report ==
=== Qualifying ===
Murphy secured provisional pole position on Friday to secure his place in the shootout, being the only driver to set a time under the 57 second bracket.

Pos	No	Name	Team	Vehicle	Time
1	51	(New Zealand) Greg Murphy	Tom Walkinshaw Racing Australia	Holden Commodore (VX)	0:56.9591
2	1	(Australia) Mark Skaife	Holden Racing Team	Holden Commodore (VX)	0:57.0133
3	4	(Australia) Marcos Ambrose	Stone Brothers Racing	Ford Falcon (AU)	0:57.0813
4	2	(Australia) Jason Bright	Holden Racing Team	Holden Commodore (VX)	0:57.1044
5	11	(Australia) Larry Perkins	Perkins Engineering	Holden Commodore (VX)	0:57.2896
6	15	(Australia) Todd Kelly	Tom Walkinshaw Racing Australia	Holden Commodore (VX)	0:57.3174
7	00	(Australia) Craig Lowndes	Gibson Motorsport	Ford Falcon (AU)	0:57.4036
8	5	(Australia) Glenn Seton	Glenn Seton Racing	Ford Falcon (AU)	0:57.4745
9	8	(Australia) Russell Ingall	Perkins Engineering	Holden Commodore (VX)	0:57.4811
10	31	(Australia) Steven Ellery	Steven Ellery Racing	Ford Falcon (AU)	0:57.5573
11	9	(Australia) David Besnard	Stone Brothers Racing	Ford Falcon (AU)	0:57.5687
12	18	(New Zealand) Paul Radisich	Dick Johnson Racing	Ford Falcon (AU)	0:57.6122
13	600	(New Zealand) Simon Wills	Briggs Motorsport	Ford Falcon (AU)	0:57.6191
14	17	(Australia) Steven Johnson	Dick Johnson Racing	Ford Falcon (AU)	0:57.6295
15	6	(New Zealand) Steven Richards	Glenn Seton Racing	Ford Falcon (AU)	0:57.6705
16	021	(New Zealand) Jason Richards	Team Kiwi Racing	Holden Commodore (VT)	0:57.7624
17	10	(Australia) Mark Larkham	Larkham Motorsport	Ford Falcon (AU)	0:57.7665
18	54	(Australia) Tony Longhurst	Rod Nash Racing	Holden Commodore (VX)	0:57.7760
19	34	(Australia) Garth Tander	Garry Rogers Motorsport	Holden Commodore (VX)	0:57.7993
20	43	(Australia) Paul Weel	Paul Weel Racing	Ford Falcon (AU)	0:57.8918
21	35	(Australia) Jason Bargwanna	Garry Rogers Motorsport	Holden Commodore (VX)	0:58.0055
22	777	(New Zealand) Angus Fogg	Team Kiwi Racing	Holden Commodore (VT)	0:58.2709
23	3	(Australia) Cameron McConville	Lansvale Racing Team	Holden Commodore (VX)	0:58.2856
24	21	(Australia) Brad Jones	Brad Jones Racing	Ford Falcon (AU)	0:58.3434
25	24	(Australia) Paul Romano	Romano Racing	Holden Commodore (VX)	0:58.4063
26	67	(Australia) Paul Morris	Paul Morris Motorsport	Holden Commodore (VT)	0:58.4992
27	75	(Australia) Anthony Tratt	Paul Little Racing	Ford Falcon (AU)	0:58.5299
28	7	(Australia) Rodney Forbes	Gibson Motorsport	Ford Falcon (AU)	0:58.5363
29	14	(Australia) Tomas Mezera	Imrie Motor Sport	Holden Commodore (VX)	0:58.9099
30	46	(New Zealand) John Faulkner	John Faulkner Racing	Holden Commodore (VT)	0:59.0430

=== Top Ten Shootout ===
Murphy became the first driver in 2001 to convert his provisional pole position into a top-ten shootout pole, much to the crowds adulation. He also remained the only driver to set a time under 57 seconds. Ingall's quest to reign in Skaife's championship lead hit a setback when he encountered gearbox problems, relegating him to tenth. With Skaife securing second on the grid, the defending champion needed only to finish ahead of Ingall in the first race of the weekend to clinch the title.

Pos	No	Name	Team	Vehicle	Time
1	51	(New Zealand) Greg Murphy	Tom Walkinshaw Racing Australia	Holden Commodore (VX)	0:56.9052
2	1	(Australia) Mark Skaife	Holden Racing Team	Holden Commodore (VX)	0:57.0313
3	4	(Australia) Marcos Ambrose	Stone Brothers Racing	Ford Falcon (AU)	0:57.1585
4	15	(Australia) Todd Kelly	Tom Walkinshaw Racing Australia	Holden Commodore (VX)	0:57.1808
5	11	(Australia) Larry Perkins	Perkins Engineering	Holden Commodore (VX)	0:57.2542
6	00	(Australia) Craig Lowndes	Gibson Motorsport	Ford Falcon (AU)	0:57.3524
7	5	(Australia) Glenn Seton	Glenn Seton Racing	Ford Falcon (AU)	0:57.3687
8	2	(Australia) Jason Bright	Holden Racing Team	Holden Commodore (VX)	0:57.5033
9	31	(Australia) Steven Ellery	Steven Ellery Racing	Ford Falcon (AU)	0:57.7089
10	8	(Australia) Russell Ingall	Perkins Engineering	Holden Commodore (VX)	1:06.8529

=== Race 1 ===
Run in overcast conditions, it did not take long for drama to unfold. Jason Bright misjudged his braking heading into the hairpin, sending Craig Lowndes into a spin and left him stranded sideways across the track. Multiple cars careened into him, including Glenn Seton, who incurred extensive damage to the front and rear of his Falcon.

Up the front, Murphy set the pace early on while Skaife and Marcos Ambrose opted to complete their mandatory pitstops as soon as possible. The sheer pace of the Kmart driver and the short nature of the circuit meant Ambrose was immediately put a lap down. Although, this was temporary, as Murphy would peel off for his pitstop merely two laps later. Exiting the pits, Steven Richards' engine expired, forcing him out of the race, ending a torrid day for Glenn Seton Racing. Multiple drivers held off their mandatory pitstops, waiting for looming rain to intervene to their advantage. One of these drivers was Simon Wills, who was making his solo main game debut. He was hindered somewhat after being stuck behind Paul Radisich who was desperate not to go a lap down. By this time, light rain began to fall upon the circuit.

Bright and Ingall came to blows at turn two, resulting in a spin for Ingall and front guard damage for Bright, who experienced great difficulty attempting to get back to pitlane. Murphy began eating into Wills' lead at the rate of up to two seconds per lap. The Briggs outfit was still hoping for the intervention of rain. Grip had reduced at this point, but there was nowhere near enough surface water to warrant a switch to wet-weather tyres. Eventually, Briggs relented and Wills pitted for contemporary dry-weather tyres. Shortly afterwards, much to their dismay, the rain had arrived. Drivers began peeling in for wet weather tyres, with the exception of a few drivers now rolling the dice with slick tyres on a wet track. This included Anthony Tratt, Paul Morris, and new race leader, Mark Larkham.

"The Australians are running this show – it’s an absolute joke...it's disgusting, unbelievable, the biggest rort I’ve seen. It was a bit disappointing for the crowd who went home Saturday thinking we had been robbed of a win. We shouldn’t have to go and check that the result is made right. It was fairly clear who won but it put a bit of a downer on things until it was sorted out."

— Greg Murphy speaking to media after the initial result declaration

By lap 30, the circuit was completely drenched. Those on slick tyres were barely able to keep their cars on the track and were forced to drive at a significantly slower pace compared to those on wets. Even those on the optimum tyre however were struggling. Visiblity was reduced to dangerous levels and eventually the surface water began catching out drivers. Fogg had beached himself in the hairpin bunker, completing an otherwise disastrous day of 'racing' for him. Soon after, Morris spun at Ford Mountain, hit the wall and was out of the race. At the same time, Murphy had passed Larkham for the lead at the hairpin as the Karcher Falcon struggled to put its power to the road, before eventually crashing at the same point where Morris had gone off moments before. Tratt would join both of them seconds later.

With cars dropping out everywhere around the circuit, visibility down to zero, and cars struggling for grip, even on wet-weather tyres, the decision was made to end the race early, with race results reverting to the lap previous to when the red flag was shown. Given Murphy had completed more than lap by the time the red flag was shown, he should have been declared the winner. Instead, Larkham was declared the victor, despite him having crashed two laps prior to the session being declared. After lodging an appeal, Murphy was subsequently declared the winner, but not after Murphy vented his frustrations to the media, questioning the integrity of the V8 Supercar officials.

Down the field, Ambrose and Skaife completed the podium, with the latter claiming his fourth Australian Touring Car title with five races to spare. Having clinched the title, Skaife pledged to assist teammate Bright to secure second in the championship ahead of Ingall in the remaining races. Many lauded Jason Richards' performance after finishing fourth, in what was widely acknowledged not to be amongst the best machinery on the grid. Other commendable performances down the grid included Tony Longhurst in sixth, Garth Tander in seventh, and Tomas Mezera in the Imrie Motor Sport car who climbed 17 positions from his original grid slot.

Pos	No	Name	Team	Laps	Time	Grid
1	51	(New Zealand) Greg Murphy	Tom Walkinshaw Racing Australia	31	32min 40.8060sec	1
2	4	(Australia) Marcos Ambrose	Stone Brothers Racing	31	+ 9.67	3
3	1	(Australia) Mark Skaife	Holden Racing Team	31	+ 10.93	2
4	021	(New Zealand) Jason Richards	Team Kiwi Racing	31	+ 12.50	16
5	8	(Australia) Russell Ingall	Perkins Engineering	31	+ 13.09	10
6	54	(Australia) Tony Longhurst	Rod Nash Racing	31	+ 22.49	18
7	34	(Australia) Garth Tander	Garry Rogers Motorsport	31	+ 24.27	19
8	15	(Australia) Todd Kelly	Tom Walkinshaw Racing Australia	31	+ 31.04	4
9	17	(Australia) Steven Johnson	Dick Johnson Racing	31	+ 34.80	14
10	35	(Australia) Jason Bargwanna	Garry Rogers Motorsport	31	+ 35.71	21
11	600	(New Zealand) Simon Wills	Briggs Motorsport	31	+ 45.75	13
12	14	(Australia) Tomas Mezera	Imrie Motor Sport	31	+ 47.97	29
13	43	(Australia) Paul Weel	Paul Weel Racing	31	+ 48.25	20
14	7	(Australia) Rodney Forbes	Gibson Motorsport	31	+ 48.60	28
15	75	(Australia) Anthony Tratt	Paul Little Racing	31	+ 2:05.13	27
16	11	(Australia) Larry Perkins	Perkins Engineering	30	+ 1 lap	5
17	18	(New Zealand) Paul Radisich	Dick Johnson Racing	30	+ 1 lap	12
18	24	(Australia) Paul Romano	Romano Racing	30	+ 1 lap	25
19	31	(Australia) Steven Ellery	Steven Ellery Racing	30	+ 1 lap	9
20	2	(Australia) Jason Bright	Holden Racing Team	30	+ 1 lap	8
21	21	(Australia) Brad Jones	Brad Jones Racing	29	+ 2 laps	24
22	9	(Australia) David Besnard	Stone Brothers Racing	29	+ 2 laps	11
23	3	(Australia) Cameron McConville	Lansvale Racing Team	29	+ 2 laps	23
24	00	(Australia) Craig Lowndes	Gibson Motorsport	29	+ 2 laps	24
Ret	10	(Australia) Mark Larkham	Larkham Motorsport	30	Accident	17
Ret	67	(Australia) Paul Morris	Paul Morris Motorsport	30	Accident	26
Ret	777	(New Zealand) Angus Fogg	Team Kiwi Racing	27	Spun off	22
Ret	46	(New Zealand) John Faulkner	John Faulkner Racing	7	Accident damage	30
Ret	6	(New Zealand) Steven Richards	Glenn Seton Racing	5	Engine	15
Ret	5	(Australia) Glenn Seton	Glenn Seton Racing	0	Accident damage	7
Fastest Lap: Greg Murphy (Tom Walkinshaw Racing Australia), 0:57.8307

=== Race 2 ===
With the championship now wrapped up, attention turned to race two. Murphy once again romped away to an early lead. Jason Richards began to struggle early as the lack of pace in the Team Kiwi Racing car became evident. Murphy and Ambrose elected to complete their mandatory pitstop at the earliest convenience. David Besnard pitted around the same time, only for his engine to develop a misfire, leaving him stranded at the pit entry.

Skaife soldiered on in the lead of the race, opting for the alternate strategy. Knowing Murphy's car was easier on its tyres, the plan was for Skaife to attempt to reign him in toward the end of the race on fresher, grippier tyres. After pitting on lap 11, Skaife emerged behind Murphy and Ambrose. After three laps, Skaife found his way past Ambrose, who chose not to fight what was clearly a faster car at the time. Kelly meanwhile received a stop/go penalty for speeding in pitlane. Ingall's race was curtailed with gearbox issues which threw him toward the bottom of the field and two laps down.

Skaife began to close on Murphy owing to the fresher tyres. The behaviour of both cars suggested Murphy and Skaife were pushing hard. Murphy began to put some distance between them both, but then Skaife closed right back up behind again with four laps remaining, suggesting perhaps he was recovering his tyres for another attack near the end. It would prove to be futile however, as Murphy remained undeterred; winning the second race of the weekend and keeping his dominant streak at Pukekohe intact.

Pos	No	Name	Team	Laps	Time / Retired	Grid
1	51	(New Zealand) Greg Murphy	Tom Walkinshaw Racing Australia	36	35min 57.9519sec	1
2	1	(Australia) Mark Skaife	Holden Racing Team	36	+ 0.708	3
3	4	(Australia) Marcos Ambrose	Stone Brothers Racing	36	+ 7.318	2
4	2	(Australia) Jason Bright	Holden Racing Team	36	+ 22.743	20
5	54	(Australia) Tony Longhurst	Rod Nash Racing	36	+ 26.862	6
6	17	(Australia) Steven Johnson	Dick Johnson Racing	36	+ 28.800	9
7	34	(Australia) Garth Tander	Garry Rogers Motorsport	36	+ 29.194	7
8	18	(New Zealand) Paul Radisich	Dick Johnson Racing	36	+ 30.936	17
9	31	(Australia) Steven Ellery	Steven Ellery Racing	36	+ 31.392	19
10	00	(Australia) Craig Lowndes	Gibson Motorsport	36	+ 43.314	24
11	43	(Australia) Paul Weel	Paul Weel Racing	36	+ 47.068	13
12	35	(Australia) Jason Bargwanna	Garry Rogers Motorsport	36	+ 48.857	10
13	7	(Australia) Rodney Forbes	Gibson Motorsport	36	+ 49.216	14
14	5	(Australia) Glenn Seton	Glenn Seton Racing	36	+ 50.081	30
15	21	(Australia) Brad Jones	Brad Jones Racing	36	+ 55.706	21
16	10	(Australia) Mark Larkham	Larkham Motorsport	36	+ 56.765	25
17	11	(Australia) Larry Perkins	Perkins Engineering	36	+ 57.214	16
18	15	(Australia) Todd Kelly	Tom Walkinshaw Racing Australia	36	+ 58.534	8
19	46	(New Zealand) John Faulkner	John Faulkner Racing	35	+ 1 lap	28
20	75	(Australia) Anthony Tratt	Paul Little Racing	35	+ 1 lap	15
21	600	(New Zealand) Simon Wills	Briggs Motorsport	35	+ 1 lap	11
22	14	(Australia) Tomas Mezera	Imrie Motor Sport	35	+ 1 lap	12
23	021	(New Zealand) Jason Richards	Team Kiwi Racing	35	+ 1 lap	4
24	777	(New Zealand) Angus Fogg	Team Kiwi Racing	35	+ 1 lap	27
25	6	(New Zealand) Steven Richards	Glenn Seton Racing	35	+ 1 lap	29
26	3	(Australia) Cameron McConville	Lansvale Racing Team	34	+ 2 laps	23
27	8	(Australia) Russell Ingall	Perkins Engineering	34	+ 2 laps	5
28	24	(Australia) Paul Romano	Romano Racing	34	+ 2 laps	18
Ret	67	(Australia) Paul Morris	Paul Morris Motorsport	8	Mechanical	26
Ret	9	(Australia) David Besnard	Stone Brothers Racing	2	Engine	22
Fastest Lap: Todd Kelly (Tom Walkinshaw Racing Australia), 0:57.6916

=== Race 3 ===
Murphy once again leapt into the lead off the start while Ambrose bogged down, losing positions to Bright and Radisich. On lap 3, Wills was taken out at turn one, beaching his car in the gravel trap. For fear of a safety car, the majority of cars peeled in for their mandatory pitstops, including the leading pair of Murphy and Skaife. As the pit cycle concluded, Bright emerged ahead of Skaife, albeit momentarily. The newly-crowned champion surged past at the hairpin and set off after Murphy.

“It has almost been the perfect weekend for me and the team.”

— Greg Murphy speaking to media after winning Race 3; completing the clean sweep for the weekend.

Jones' power steering failed on lap 10, forcing him out of the race. Not long after, Cameron McConville crashed heavily at the end of the front straight. The precarious position of the car resulted in the deployment of the safety car. On the restart, Murphy remained unchallenged. Keeping the lead until the very end. Paul Weel retired from the race with radiator damage incurred through outside assistance. At the hairpin, Paul Romano and Garth Tander spun each other two separate times, with Tander's seemingly being an act of retaliation. Radisich's first lap efforts were eradicated after he was issued a drive-through penalty for kerb-hopping.

To the adulation of the crowd, Murphy crossed the line as the victor, completing the clean sweep and remaining undefeated at Pukekohe. Reaffirming his title of the 'King of Pukekohe'. Meanwhile, the Holden Racing Team were engaging in tactics to help Bright's position in the championship. On the final corner of the final lap, Skaife allowed Bright to pass him for second, which drew mild ire from the watching public. Longhurst's eighth place meant he would finish fifth for the round; a tremendous result for the underfunded Rod Nash Racing outfit.

Pos	No	Name	Team	Laps	Time / Retired	Grid
1	51	(New Zealand) Greg Murphy	Tom Walkinshaw Racing Australia	36	39min 47.0899sec	1
2	2	(Australia) Jason Bright	Holden Racing Team	36	+ 6.127	4
3	1	(Australia) Mark Skaife	Holden Racing Team	36	+ 6.622	2
4	4	(Australia) Marcos Ambrose	Stone Brothers Racing	36	+ 7.534	3
5	15	(Australia) Todd Kelly	Tom Walkinshaw Racing Australia	36	+ 8.372	18
6	17	(Australia) Steven Johnson	Dick Johnson Racing	36	+ 12.057	6
7	11	(Australia) Larry Perkins	Perkins Engineering	36	+ 12.631	17
8	00	(Australia) Craig Lowndes	Gibson Motorsport	36	+ 17.989	10
9	54	(Australia) Tony Longhurst	Rod Nash Racing	36	+ 18.701	5
10	10	(Australia) Mark Larkham	Larkham Motorsport	36	+ 20.244	16
11	8	(Australia) Russell Ingall	Perkins Engineering	36	+ 20.563	27
12	31	(Australia) Steven Ellery	Steven Ellery Racing	36	+ 20.913	9
13	5	(Australia) Glenn Seton	Glenn Seton Racing	36	+ 27.114	14
14	7	(Australia) Rodney Forbes	Gibson Motorsport	36	+ 28.403	13
15	35	(Australia) Jason Bargwanna	Garry Rogers Motorsport	36	+ 31.184	12
16	34	(Australia) Garth Tander	Garry Rogers Motorsport	36	+ 33.103	7
17	46	(New Zealand) John Faulkner	John Faulkner Racing	36	+ 34.800	19
18	14	(Australia) Tomas Mezera	Imrie Motor Sport	36	+ 48.173	22
19	18	(New Zealand) Paul Radisich	Dick Johnson Racing	36	+ 42.674	8
20	6	(New Zealand) Steven Richards	Glenn Seton Racing	35	+ 1 lap	25
21	9	(Australia) David Besnard	Stone Brothers Racing	35	+ 1 lap	29
22	021	(New Zealand) Jason Richards	Team Kiwi Racing	34	+ 2 laps	23
23	24	(Australia) Paul Romano	Romano Racing	34	+ 2 laps	28
24	777	(New Zealand) Angus Fogg	Team Kiwi Racing	33	+ 3 laps	24
Ret	43	(Australia) Paul Weel	Paul Weel Racing	23	Radiator	11
Ret	3	(Australia) Cameron McConville	Lansvale Racing Team	15	Accident	26
Ret	21	(Australia) Brad Jones	Brad Jones Racing	10	Power steering	15
Ret	75	(Australia) Anthony Tratt	Paul Little Racing	6	Retired	20
Ret	600	(New Zealand) Simon Wills	Briggs Motorsport	2	Spun off	21
Fastest Lap: Todd Kelly (Tom Walkinshaw Racing Australia), 0:57.6981

== Aftermath ==
The V8 Supercar Championship would return to Pukekohe for a further six events, with Murphy remaining largely dominant up until the end of the 2005 event. After conceding the race to Hamilton in 2008, the series would return to Pukekohe in 2013, up until the circuits closure in 2022.

This round would turn out to be Fogg's final drive in the V8 Supercar series. After this, he kept largely to the domestic racing scene in his native New Zealand.

=== Championship points ===
Round points tally

Pos.	No	Driver	Team	Pts
1	51	(New Zealand) Greg Murphy	Tom Walkinshaw Racing Australia	288
2	1	(Australia) Mark Skaife	Holden Racing Team	240
3	4	(Australia) Marcos Ambrose	Stone Brothers Racing	232
4	2	(Australia) Jason Bright	Holden Racing Team	181
5	54	(Australia) Tony Longhurst	Rod Nash Racing	168

Drivers' Championship standings after Round 12

Pos.	No	Driver	Team	Pts
1	1	(Australia) Mark Skaife	Holden Racing Team	3290
2	8	(Australia) Russell Ingall	Perkins Engineering	2720
3	2	(Australia) Jason Bright	Holden Racing Team	2635
4	51	(New Zealand) Greg Murphy	Tom Walkinshaw Racing Australia	2562
5	17	(Australia) Steven Johnson	Dick Johnson Racing	2440
