= Andy Booth (racing driver) =

New Zealand racing driver

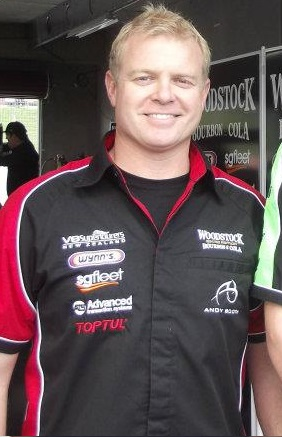
- Andy Booth at Hampton Downs 2012
- Nationality: New Zealand
- Born: 2 June 1974 (age 52) Auckland, New Zealand

V8 SuperTourer career
- Debut season: 2012
- Current team: Andy Booth Racing
- Car number: 23

Previous series
- Tasman Series; Indy Lights; Slick 50 Formula Ford; Formula Palmer Audi; NZ Formula Ford Series; New Zealand V8s

Championship titles
- 2004, 2005: New Zealand V8s

Awards
- 2005: Jim Clark Trophy

Andrew Booth (born 2 June 1974) is a New Zealand racing driver.

A relatively late starter in motorsport, Booth never raced karts, and only competed in a handful of Formula Ford events in New Zealand before heading to the UK where he spent several years successfully campaigning in the Slick 50 Formula Ford Championship, and later in the Formula Palmer Audi series. He has also competed in Indy Lights in the US and Formula Holden in Australia.

Booth won the Tasman Series (Formula Holden) in 2000, driving for the NRC International team, also taking the New Zealand Grand Prix and Denny Hulme Memorial Trophy in the same year. Booth then briefly competed in Indy Lights in the US,

Since 2001, Booth has been competing in the NZ V8s exclusively, winning the series in 03/04 and 04/05, and consistently placing in the top 6. Previously a 'part-time' driver, as of 2007 Booth now drives full-time and manages the New Zealand operations of Tasman Motorsport.

In 2009, Booth became the presenter of NZV8 TV.

== Racing record ==
=== Career summary ===
| Season | Series | Team | Races | Wins | Poles | F. laps | Podiums | Points | Position |
|---|---|---|---|---|---|---|---|---|---|
| 1996 | Formula Ford Great Britain – First Division | | 4 | ? | ? | ? | ? | 98 | **3rd** |
| 1998 | Formula Palmer Audi | | 16 | 0 | ? | ? | 1 | 116 | 11th |
| 1999 | Formula Palmer Audi | | 15 | 0 | ? | 0 | 0 | 117 | 13th |
| 2000 | Formula Holden Tasman Cup | NRC International | 4 | 2 | 0 | 0 | 2 | 84 | **1st** |
| 2000 | Australian Drivers' Championship | Hocking Motorsport | 12 | 0 | ? | ? | 0 | 54 | 10th |
| 2001 | Indy Lights | Brian Stewart Racing | 1 | 0 | 0 | 0 | 0 | 8 | 14th |
| 2001-02 | New Zealand V8s Championship | | 15 | 4 | ? | ? | 4 | 415 | **2nd** |
| 2002-03 | New Zealand Super GT Championship | | 3 | 0 | 0 | 0 | 1 | 34 | 32nd |
| 2002-03 | New Zealand V8s Championship | AV8 Motorsport | 18 | 2 | ? | ? | ? | 312 | 4th |
| 2003-04 | New Zealand V8s Championship | AV8 Motorsport | 20 | 7 | ? | ? | ? | 457 | **1st** |
| 2004-05 | New Zealand V8s Championship | AV8 Motorsport | 21 | 7 | 1 | 1 | 10 | 1183 | **1st** |
| 2005-06 | New Zealand V8s Championship | Force Motorsports | 21 | 0 | 0 | 0 | 5 | 920 | **3rd** |
| 2006-07 | New Zealand V8s Championship | AV8 Motorsport | 21 | 1 | 0 | 0 | 5 | 692 | 6th |
| 2007-08 | New Zealand V8s Championship | AV8 Motorsport | 18 | 1 | 2 | 2 | 6 | 809 | 4th |
| 2008-09 | New Zealand V8s Championship | AV8 Motorsport | 20 | 1 | 0 | 0 | 8 | 983 | 4th |
| 2009-10 | New Zealand V8s Championship | AV8 Motorsport | 18 | 0 | 0 | 0 | 4 | 774 | 5th |
| 2010-11 | New Zealand V8s Championship | AV8 Motorsport | 21 | 1 | ? | 1 | 6 | 1002 | **3rd** |
| 2012 | V8SuperTourers | AV8 Motorsport | 19 | 0 | 0 | 1 | 5 | 2656 | 4th |
| 2013 | V8SuperTourers | AV8 Motorsport | 19 | 1 | 0 | 1 | 2 | 1701 | 13th |
| 2015 | New Zealand V8 Ute Racing Series | | 3 | 1 | 0 | 0 | 2 | 79 | 17th |
| 2016 | New Zealand V8 Ute Racing Series | | 6 | 1 | 0 | 2 | 4 | 142 | 8th |

=== American open–wheel racing results ===
(key) (Races in bold indicate pole position) (Races in italics indicate fastest lap)

==== Indy Lights ====
| Year | Team | 1 | 2 | 3 | 4 | 5 | 6 | 7 | 8 | 9 | 10 | 11 | 12 | Rank | Points | Ref |
|---|---|---|---|---|---|---|---|---|---|---|---|---|---|---|---|---|
| 2001 | Brian Stewart Racing | MTY | LBH; 6 | TXS | MIL | POR | KAN | TOR | MOH | STL | ATL | LS | FON | **14th** | **8** | |
