= Angus Fogg =

New Zealand racing driver

- Nationality: New Zealand
- Born: Angus Cameron Fogg; 26 August 1967 (age 59) Cambridge, New Zealand

V8 SuperTourers career
- Debut season: 2012
- Current team: Angus Fogg Racing
- Car number: 247
- Starts: 7
- Wins: 0
- Poles: 0
- Fastest laps: 0
- Best finish: 23rd in 2012

Angus Cameron Fogg (born 26 August 1967) is a championship-winning New Zealand racing driver.

== New Zealand V8 Championship ==
Fogg joined the NZ V8 Championship for the 2003–04 season after taking a year off from motorsport. His debut season in NZV8's was as a privateer, but his previous involvements with the V8 Supercars helped his cause, coming home fourth place overall, and taking the Rookie of the Year title as well. Fogg joined the International Motorsport team for the following season where he built two Ford Falcon V8s for the 2004–05 season but could not manage the same performance as the season before, finishing up 12th overall. 2005-06 was another good season for Fogg, finishing up second overall and he was also the first Ford driver home, in 2007-07, he was third overall, and in 2007-08 second overall. Fogg finished sixth overall in the 2008-09 Championship, 8th in the 2009-10 Championship, and fourth in the 2010-12 Championship after leading the points table virtually all season. Fogg currently holds the lap record for the New Zealand V8s Championship series at Manfeild Autocourse of 1:12.810 (2008)).

As of Round Two of the 2011-12 BNTV8s Championship at Powerbuilt Raceway at Ruapuna Park at 10–11 December 2011, Fogg lead the points tables with 418 points over Jason Bargwanna with 362 points and Tim Edgell on 324 points.

Fogg runs his own 'Radio Sport' race team in conjunction with car owner Kevin Williams.

Fogg's family of sponsors in his 2011-12 quest to win New Zealand's Gold Star Saloon title include Radio Sport, Mountshop, Hydraulink Hose & Fittings, Supercharge Batteries, Segedins Auto Spares of Dominion Road, Strapping Systems (NZ) Ltd, Moselle Panel & Paint, PPG, Affordable PartsWorld, HIAB Services, Delo, Brenics Transport Ltd, i-Sign it, Fromm Packaging Systems, Tom Ryan Cartage, The Interislander, Mason Tool & Engineering, Stainless Welding and Invercargill Oil Shop.

== Career results ==
Season	Series	Team	Races	Wins	Poles	F/laps	Podiums	Points	Position
1996-97	New Zealand Mini-7 Championship		?	?	?	?	?	?	1st
1996-97	New Zealand Touring Car Championship	West Auckland Ford	6	0	0	0	0	82	15th
1997-98	New Zealand Mini-7 Championship		?	?	?	?	?	?	1st
1998-99	New Zealand Touring Car Championship	West Auckland Ford	3	0	0	0	2	27	10th
1999-00	New Zealand Touring Car Championship	Angus Fogg Racing	18	6	6	5	15	267	2nd
2000	Shell Championship Series	Team Kiwi Racing	1	0	0	0	0	48	51st
2000-01	New Zealand Touring Car Championship	Kiwi Racing	18	4	0	8	10	475	2nd
2001	Shell Championship Series	Team Kiwi Racing	7	0	0	0	0	464	38th
2001-02	New Zealand Touring Car Championship	Kiwi Racing	14	2	0	2	9	335	4th
2003-04	New Zealand V8s Championship	Angus Fogg Racing	20	0	1	?	6	310	4th
2004-05	New Zealand V8s Championship	International Motorsport	21	0	0	4	2	570	12th
2005-06	New Zealand V8s Championship	International Motorsport	21	5	3	7	11	1131	2nd
2006-07	New Zealand V8s Championship	International Motorsport	21	4	0	?	10	1006	3rd
2007-08	New Zealand V8s Championship	Angus Fogg Racing	18	2	2	4	9	977	2nd
2008-09	New Zealand V8s Championship	Angus Fogg Racing	21	2	0	6	6	791	6th
2009-10	New Zealand V8s Championship	Angus Fogg Racing	18	2	1	4	3	602	8th
2010-11	New Zealand V8s Championship	Angus Fogg Racing	21	4	1	5	11	975	4th
2011-12	New Zealand V8s Championship	Angus Fogg Racing	12	6	2	7	11	834	1st
2012	V8SuperTourers	Angus Fogg Racing	10	0	0	0	0	895	23rd
2012	New Zealand Super Truck Championship		?	?	?	?	?	76	4th
2013	V8SuperTourers	Angus Fogg Racing	21	0	0	0	0	1203	20th
2013-14	Toyota Finance 86 Championship	Gulf Foods Racing	6	2	4	2	3	358	7th
2014	V8SuperTourers	Angus Fogg Racing	8	1	0	1	1	314	13th
2014-15	V8SuperTourers	Angus Fogg Racing	9	0	0	0	1	737	16th
2015-16	NZ Touring Cars Championship	Angus Fogg Racing	17	1	0	0	6	691	7th

=== V8 Supercar Championship results ===
V8 Supercars results
Year	Team	Car	1	2	3	4	5	6	7	8	9	10	11	12	13	14	15	16	17	18	19	20	21	22	23	24	25	26	27	28	29	30	31	32	33	Position	Points
2000	Team Kiwi Racing	Holden Commodore (VT)	PHI; R1	PHI; R2	BAR; R3	BAR; R4	BAR; R5	ADE; R6	ADE; R7	EAS; R8	EAS; R9	EAS; R10	HDV; R11	HDV; R12	HDV; R13	CAN; R14	CAN; R15	CAN; R16	QLD; R17	QLD; R18	QLD; R19	WIN; R20	WIN; R21	WIN; R22	ORA; R23	ORA; R24	ORA; R25	CAL; R26	CAL; R27	CAL; R28	QLD; R29	SAN; R30	SAN; R31	SAN; R32	BAT; R33; 16	51st	48
2001	Team Kiwi Racing	Holden Commodore (VT)	PHI; R1	PHI; R2	ADE; R3; 22	ADE; R4; Ret	EAS; R5	EAS; R6	HDV; R7	HDV; R8	HDV; R9	CAN; R10	CAN; R11	CAN; R12	BAR; R13	BAR; R14	BAR; R15	CAL; R16	CAL; R17	CAL; R18	ORA; R19	ORA; R20	QLD; R21; 13	WIN; R22	WIN; R23	BAT; R24; 16	PUK; R25; Ret	PUK; R26; 24	PUK; R27; 24	SAN; R28	SAN; R29	SAN; R30				38th	464

=== Bathurst 1000 results ===
Year	Team	Car	Co-driver	Position	Laps
2000	Team Kiwi Racing	Holden Commodore (VT)	(New Zealand) Jason Richards	16th	157
2001	Team Kiwi Racing	Holden Commodore (VT)	(New Zealand) Jason Richards	16th	157
