= 2013–14 Toyota Finance 86 Championship =

Seasons
- ← none 2014–15 →

The Toyota Finance 86 Championship was a brand new One-make racing series in New Zealand, made up of race ready Toyota 86 cars. The series ran across six rounds throughout the New Zealand summer, after the seventh round – a scheduled three-hour endurance race at Pukekohe Park Raceway – was cancelled.

The series was organised and run by the same people that run the popular Toyota Racing Series each summer, and the new one-make series featured past drivers of the Toyota Racing Series. One of these drivers, Jamie McNee, became the inaugural champion at the end of the series.

== Race calendar ==
Round		Circuit	Date	Map
2013				2013–14 Toyota Finance 86 Championship is located in New Zealand
1	R1	Highlands Motorsport Park (Cromwell, Otago)	9 November	2013–14 Toyota Finance 86 Championship is located in New Zealand
1	R2	Highlands Motorsport Park (Cromwell, Otago)	10 November	2013–14 Toyota Finance 86 Championship is located in New Zealand
1	R3	Highlands Motorsport Park (Cromwell, Otago)	10 November	2013–14 Toyota Finance 86 Championship is located in New Zealand
2	R1	Pukekohe Park Raceway (Pukekohe, Auckland Region)	30 November	2013–14 Toyota Finance 86 Championship is located in New Zealand
2	R2	Pukekohe Park Raceway (Pukekohe, Auckland Region)	1 December	2013–14 Toyota Finance 86 Championship is located in New Zealand
2	R3	Pukekohe Park Raceway (Pukekohe, Auckland Region)	1 December	2013–14 Toyota Finance 86 Championship is located in New Zealand
2014				2013–14 Toyota Finance 86 Championship is located in New Zealand
3	R1	Hampton Downs Motorsport Park (Hampton Downs, North Waikato)	1 February	2013–14 Toyota Finance 86 Championship is located in New Zealand
3	R2	Hampton Downs Motorsport Park (Hampton Downs, North Waikato)	2 February	2013–14 Toyota Finance 86 Championship is located in New Zealand
3	R3	Hampton Downs Motorsport Park (Hampton Downs, North Waikato)	2 February	2013–14 Toyota Finance 86 Championship is located in New Zealand
4	R1	Manfeild Autocourse (Feilding, Manawatū District)	8 February	2013–14 Toyota Finance 86 Championship is located in New Zealand
4	R2	Manfeild Autocourse (Feilding, Manawatū District)	9 February	2013–14 Toyota Finance 86 Championship is located in New Zealand
4	R3	Manfeild Autocourse (Feilding, Manawatū District)	9 February	2013–14 Toyota Finance 86 Championship is located in New Zealand
5	R1	Taupo Motorsport Park (Taupō, Waikato)	8 March	2013–14 Toyota Finance 86 Championship is located in New Zealand
5	R2	Taupo Motorsport Park (Taupō, Waikato)	9 March	2013–14 Toyota Finance 86 Championship is located in New Zealand
5	R3	Taupo Motorsport Park (Taupō, Waikato)	9 March	2013–14 Toyota Finance 86 Championship is located in New Zealand
6	R1	Hampton Downs Motorsport Park (Hampton Downs, North Waikato)	3 May	2013–14 Toyota Finance 86 Championship is located in New Zealand
6	R2	Hampton Downs Motorsport Park (Hampton Downs, North Waikato)	3 May	2013–14 Toyota Finance 86 Championship is located in New Zealand
6	R3	Hampton Downs Motorsport Park (Hampton Downs, North Waikato)	4 May	2013–14 Toyota Finance 86 Championship is located in New Zealand
6	R4	Hampton Downs Motorsport Park (Hampton Downs, North Waikato)	4 May	2013–14 Toyota Finance 86 Championship is located in New Zealand

== Teams and drivers ==
Team	No.	Driver	Class	Rounds
Neil Allport Motorsports	001	(New Zealand) Bill Williams	M	1
Neil Allport Motorsports	08	(New Zealand) Matthew Williams	M	1
Neil Allport Motorsports	08	(New Zealand) Neil Allport	M	4
Neil Allport Motorsports	08	(New Zealand) John Lovich	A	5–6
Neil Allport Motorsports	18	(New Zealand) Richard Oxton	A	2–3
Neale Motorsport	9	(New Zealand) Marcus Armstrong	A	5–6
Ken Smith Motor Racing	11	(New Zealand) Tom Alexander	E	All
Gulf Foods Racing	22	(New Zealand) Angus Fogg	E	1–2
ETEC Motorsport	47	(New Zealand) Ken Smith	M	2
ETEC Motorsport	48	(New Zealand) Ken Smith	M	6
ETEC Motorsport	48	(New Zealand) Andrew Waite	E	3–5
M3 Racing	58	(New Zealand) Tony Houston	M	1–2, 5–6
M3 Racing	58	(New Zealand) Craig Innes	E	3
M3 Racing	58	(New Zealand) Geoff Spencer	M	4
West City Motorsport	66	(New Zealand) Ash Blewett	A	All
Richards Team Motorsport	69	(New Zealand) Jamie McNee	E	All
Matt Gibson Motorsport	88	(New Zealand) Matt Gibson	A	All
Quin Motorsport	91	(New Zealand) Callum Quin	A	All

Icon	Class
E	Elite
A	Amateur
M	Master

== Results and standings ==
=== Season summary ===
All rounds were held in New Zealand. Rounds 3 and 4 were held with the Toyota Racing Series. The original final round, that was scheduled for Pukekohe Park Raceway on 17 and 18 May, was later removed from the calendar.

Round		Circuit	Pole position	Fastest lap	Winning driver	Winning team	Round winner(s)
2013
1	R1	Highlands Motorsport Park	(New Zealand) Angus Fogg	(New Zealand) Callum Quin	(New Zealand) Angus Fogg	Gulf Foods Racing	(New Zealand) Angus Fogg
1	R2	Highlands Motorsport Park		(New Zealand) Jamie McNee	(New Zealand) Jamie McNee	Richards Team Motorsport	(New Zealand) Angus Fogg
1	R3=	Highlands Motorsport Park		(New Zealand) Callum Quin	(New Zealand) Angus Fogg	Gulf Foods Racing	(New Zealand) Angus Fogg
2	R1	Pukekohe Park Raceway	(New Zealand) Angus Fogg	(New Zealand) Tom Alexander	(New Zealand) Ash Blewett	West City Motorsport	(New Zealand) Ash Blewett
2	R2	Pukekohe Park Raceway		(New Zealand) Angus Fogg	(New Zealand) Tom Alexander	Ken Smith Motor Racing	(New Zealand) Ash Blewett
2	R3	Pukekohe Park Raceway		(New Zealand) Angus Fogg	(New Zealand) Jamie McNee	Richards Team Motorsport	(New Zealand) Ash Blewett
2014
3	R1	Hampton Downs Motorsport Park	(New Zealand) Andrew Waite	(New Zealand) Andrew Waite	(New Zealand) Jamie McNee	Richards Team Motorsport	(New Zealand) Andrew Waite
3	R2	Hampton Downs Motorsport Park		(New Zealand) Andrew Waite	(New Zealand) Andrew Waite	ETEC Motorsport	(New Zealand) Andrew Waite
3	R3	Hampton Downs Motorsport Park		(New Zealand) Jamie McNee	(New Zealand) Andrew Waite	ETEC Motorsport	(New Zealand) Andrew Waite
4	R1	Manfeild Autocourse	(New Zealand) Ash Blewett	(New Zealand) Andrew Waite	(New Zealand) Andrew Waite	ETEC Motorsport	(New Zealand) Jamie McNee
4	R2	Manfeild Autocourse		(New Zealand) Tom Alexander	(New Zealand) Jamie McNee	Richards Team Motorsport	(New Zealand) Jamie McNee
4	R3	Manfeild Autocourse		(New Zealand) Andrew Waite	(New Zealand) Andrew Waite	ETEC Motorsport	(New Zealand) Jamie McNee
5	R1	Taupo Motorsport Park	(New Zealand) Ash Blewett	(New Zealand) Tom Alexander	(New Zealand) Jamie McNee	Richards Team Motorsport	(New Zealand) Jamie McNee
5	R2	Taupo Motorsport Park		(New Zealand) Tom Alexander	(New Zealand) Callum Quin	Quin Motorsport	(New Zealand) Jamie McNee
5	R3	Taupo Motorsport Park		(New Zealand) Andrew Waite	(New Zealand) Andrew Waite	ETEC Motorsport	(New Zealand) Jamie McNee
6	R1	Hampton Downs Motorsport Park	(New Zealand) Jamie McNee	(New Zealand) Tom Alexander	(New Zealand) Jamie McNee	Richards Team Motorsport	(New Zealand) Ash Blewett
6	R2	Hampton Downs Motorsport Park		(New Zealand) Jamie McNee	(New Zealand) Ash Blewett	West City Motorsport	(New Zealand) Ash Blewett
6	R3	Hampton Downs Motorsport Park		(New Zealand) Ash Blewett	(New Zealand) Ash Blewett	West City Motorsport	(New Zealand) Ash Blewett
6	R4	Hampton Downs Motorsport Park		(New Zealand) Tom Alexander	(New Zealand) Ash Blewett	West City Motorsport	(New Zealand) Ash Blewett

=== Championship standings ===
In order for a driver to score championship points, they had to complete at least 90% of the race winner's distance. All races counted towards the final championship standings.

Scoring system

Position	1st	2nd	3rd	4th	5th	6th	7th	8th	9th
Points	75	67	60	54	49	45	42	39	36

Pos	Driver	HIG			PUK			HAM1			MAN			TAU			HAM2				Pts
Pos	Driver	R1	R2	R3	R1	R2	R3	R1	R2	R3	R1	R2	R3	R1	R2	R3	R1	R2	R3	R4	Pts
1	(New Zealand) Jamie McNee (E)	5	1	2	8	5	1	1	2	2	2	1	4	1	2	3	**1**	2	DSQ	2	1170
2	(New Zealand) Ash Blewett (A)	Ret	5	6	1	2	2	3	3	6	**5**	3	3	**2**	4	4	4	1	1	1	1091
3	(New Zealand) Callum Quin (A)	4	4	4	4	3	4	4	7	3	4	2	5	3	1	6	3	3	3	4	1070
4	(New Zealand) Tom Alexander (E)	2	3	3	3	1	3	7	6	7	3	7	2	DSQ	3	2	2	4	2	3	1055
5	(New Zealand) Matt Gibson (A)	3	2	5	5	6	6	5	4	5	6	4	6	4	6	5	5	5	4	6	956
6	(New Zealand) Andrew Waite (E)							**2**	1	1	1	8	1	Ret	5	1					530
7	(New Zealand) Angus Fogg (E)	**1**	6	1	**2**	4	7														358
8	(New Zealand) Marcus Armstrong (A)													5	7	7	6	6	5	5	321
9	(New Zealand) Tony Houston (M)	6	7	Ret	Ret	DNS	9							7	9	9	8	8	DNS	DNS	315
10	(New Zealand) Ken Smith (M)				7	8	8										9	7	6	7	285
11	(New Zealand) Richard Oxton (A)				6	7	5	6	5	4											284
12	(New Zealand) John Lovich (A)													6	8	8	7	Ret	Ret	DNS	165
13	(New Zealand) Geoff Spencer (M)										7	5	8								130
14	(New Zealand) Neil Allport (M)										8	6	7								126
15	(New Zealand) Matthew Williams (M)	7	8	7																	123
16	(New Zealand) Craig Innes (E)							DNS	8	8											78
17	(New Zealand) Bill Williams (M)	DNS	9	Ret																	36
Pos	Driver	R1	R2	R3	R1	R2	R3	R1	R2	R3	R1	R2	R3	R1	R2	R3	R1	R2	R3	R4	Pts
Pos	Driver	HIG			PUK			HAM1			MAN			TAU			HAM2				Pts

Colour	Result
Gold	Winner
Silver	Second place
Bronze	Third place
Green	Points classification
Blue	Non-points classification
Blue	Non-classified finish (NC)
Purple	Retired, not classified (Ret)
Red	Did not qualify (DNQ)
Red	Did not pre-qualify (DNPQ)
Black	Disqualified (DSQ)
White	Did not start (DNS)
White	Withdrew (WD)
White	Race cancelled (C)
Blank	Did not practice (DNP)
Blank	Did not arrive (DNA)
Blank	Excluded (EX)

**Bold** – Pole
Italics – Fastest Lap
(E) – Elite
(A) – Amateur
(M) – Master
