= 2001 Adelaide 500 =

2001 Supercar Championship event

(South Australia) 2001 Adelaide 500
Event Information
- Round 2 of 13 in the 2001 Shell Championship Series
- Date: 6–8 April 2001
- Location: Adelaide, South Australia
- Venue: Adelaide Street Circuit
- Weather: Overcast, Fine

Results
Race 1
Distance	78 laps	250 km
Pole position	Greg Murphy; Tom Walkinshaw Racing Australia	1:25.9204
Winner	Craig Lowndes; Gibson Motorsport	2:02:49.1189
Race 2
Distance	78 laps	250 km
Winner	Jason Bright; Holden Racing Team	2:06:34.5914
Round Results
First	Jason Bright; Holden Racing Team	468 pts
Second	Russell Ingall; Perkins Engineering	464 pts
Third	Steven Johnson; Dick Johnson Racing	455 pts

The 2001 Adelaide 500 (known for naming rights reasons as the 2001 Clipsal 500 Adelaide) was the third running of the Adelaide 500 event. The event served as the second round of the 2001 Shell Championship Series and was held from April 6 to 8, 2001.

The first race of the weekend was won by Craig Lowndes, thus securing his first win for the Ford since his switch from the Holden Racing Team. In doing so, it was also Gibson Motorsport's first win for Ford. Sunday's race was won by Jason Bright who climbed through the field after contact on lap one that forced him to pit for repairs. The race was also notable for the late-race battle, and eventual collision, between former Holden Racing Team teammates, Lowndes and Mark Skaife.

Bright's overall round victory allowed him to leapfrog teammate Skaife in the driver standings heading into the third round at Eastern Creek. This was also the last year that the Adelaide circuit would feature a chicane at turn eight. From 2002, the corner would be reprofiled into a sweeper that would become a staple of the circuit in the years that followed.

== Background ==
The format, unique to V8 Supercars, and loosely similar to the Pukekohe 500 format, splits the 500 kilometre event into two separate 250 kilometre-races, each held on a different day. Points were assigned separately to the races, with Race 2 paying double points over Race 1 (180 points for a win in Race 1 and 360 points for a win in Race 2), and they combined to award a round result. The defending event winner from 2000 was Garth Tander of Garry Rogers Motorsport.

Mark Skaife entered the round with a 50-point lead over nearest competitor Craig Lowndes after dominating the opening round at Phillip Island.

=== Entry list ===
Several drivers would make their first appearances for the 2001 season in this event. This included Angus Fogg for Team Kiwi Racing, Alan Heath for Power Racing, and Garry Holt for Emerzidis Motorsport.

== Race report ==
=== Qualifying ===
Sporting a brand-new Dick Johnson Racing AU Falcon, Paul Radisich set the pace in qualifying with a time nearly four-tenths clear of nearest competitor, Mark Larkham. The top 18 cars in qualifying had set a laptime under the previous track record set by Jason Bright in 1999.

Pos	No	Name	Team	Vehicle	Time
1	18	(New Zealand) Paul Radisich	Dick Johnson Racing	Ford Falcon (AU)	1:25.1107
2	10	(Australia) Mark Larkham	Larkham Motorsport	Ford Falcon (AU)	1:25.4839
3	2	(Australia) Jason Bright	Holden Racing Team	Holden Commodore (VX)	1:25.5169
4	8	(Australia) Russell Ingall	Perkins Engineering	Holden Commodore (VX)	1:25.5629
5	15	(Australia) Todd Kelly	Tom Walkinshaw Racing Australia	Holden Commodore (VX)	1:25.5657
6	5	(Australia) Glenn Seton	Glenn Seton Racing	Ford Falcon (AU)	1:25.5836
7	600	(Australia) John Bowe	Briggs Motorsport	Ford Falcon (AU)	1:25.5961
8	00	(Australia) Craig Lowndes	Gibson Motorsport	Ford Falcon (AU)	1:25.6145
9	34	(Australia) Garth Tander	Garry Rogers Motorsport	Holden Commodore (VX)	1:25.6629
10	17	(Australia) Steven Johnson	Dick Johnson Racing	Ford Falcon (AU)	1:25.6792
11	11	(Australia) Larry Perkins	Perkins Engineering	Holden Commodore (VX)	1:25.6948
12	4	(Australia) Marcos Ambrose	Stone Brothers Racing	Ford Falcon (AU)	1:25.7168
13	51	(New Zealand) Greg Murphy	Tom Walkinshaw Racing Australia	Holden Commodore (VX)	1:25.7348
14	1	(Australia) Mark Skaife	Holden Racing Team	Holden Commodore (VX)	1:25.7500
15	6	(New Zealand) Steven Richards	Glenn Seton Racing	Ford Falcon (AU)	1:25.8611
16	31	(Australia) Steven Ellery	Steven Ellery Racing	Ford Falcon (AU)	1:25.8773
17	35	(Australia) Jason Bargwanna	Garry Rogers Motorsport	Holden Commodore (VX)	1:26.0018
18	40	(Australia) Cameron McLean	Paragon Motorsport	Ford Falcon (AU)	1:26.1022
19	9	(Australia) David Besnard	Stone Brothers Racing	Ford Falcon (AU)	1:26.3862
20	45	(Australia) Dean Canto	RPM International Racing	Ford Falcon (AU)	1:26.7541
21	16	(Australia) Dugal McDougall	McDougall Motorsport	Holden Commodore (VX)	1:26.8853
22	7	(Australia) Rodney Forbes	Gibson Motorsport	Ford Falcon (AU)	1:26.9764
23	46	(New Zealand) John Faulkner	John Faulkner Racing	Holden Commodore (VT)	1:26.9780
24	3	(Australia) Cameron McConville	Lansvale Racing Team	Holden Commodore (VX)	1:27.2000
25	21	(Australia) Brad Jones	Brad Jones Racing	Ford Falcon (AU)	1:27.3983
26	76	(Australia) Matthew White	Matthew White Racing	Holden Commodore (VS)	1:27.4698
27	54	(Australia) Tony Longhurst	Rod Nash Racing	Holden Commodore (VX)	1:27.5359
28	32	(Australia) Tomas Mezera	Tomas Mezera Racing	Holden Commodore (VT)	1:27.7258
29	75	(Australia) Anthony Tratt	Paul Little Racing	Ford Falcon (AU)	1:27.7565
30	50	(Australia) Tyler Mecklem	Clive Wiseman Racing	Holden Commodore (VT)	1:27.8668
31	021	(New Zealand) Jason Richards	Team Kiwi Racing	Holden Commodore (VT)	1:27.9479
32	24	(Australia) Paul Romano	Romano Racing	Holden Commodore (VX)	1:27.9847
33	43	(Australia) Paul Weel	Paul Weel Racing	Ford Falcon (AU)	1:28.1315
34	23	(Australia) Trevor Ashby	Lansvale Racing Team	Holden Commodore (VS)	1:28.2512
35	500	(Australia) Alan Heath	Power Racing	Ford Falcon (AU)	1:28.7735
36	20	(Australia) Garry Holt	Emerzidis Motorsport	Ford Falcon (EL)	1:29.0285
37	14	(Australia) Greg Ritter	Imrie Motorsport	Holden Commodore (VX)	1:30.0436
38	777	(New Zealand) Angus Fogg	Team Kiwi Racing	Holden Commodore (VT)	1:30.2553
39	61	(Australia) Ross Halliday	Halliday Motorsport	Ford Falcon (EL)	1:32.2979

=== Top fifteen shootout ===
Preceding the shootout, a tyre bundle was installed at the Senna Chicane to deter corner-cutting. This would be removed for the races.

Pos	No	Driver	Team	Car	Time	Points
1	51	(New Zealand) Greg Murphy	Tom Walkinshaw Racing Australia	Holden Commodore (VX)	1:25.9204	18
2	1	(Australia) Mark Skaife	Holden Racing Team	Holden Commodore (VX)	1:25.9746	16
3	15	(Australia) Todd Kelly	Tom Walkinshaw Racing Australia	Holden Commodore (VX)	1:25.9959	14
4	18	(New Zealand) Paul Radisich	Dick Johnson Racing	Ford Falcon (AU)	1:26.0485	13
5	5	(Australia) Glenn Seton	Glenn Seton Racing	Ford Falcon (AU)	1:26.0818	12
6	4	(Australia) Marcos Ambrose	Stone Brothers Racing	Ford Falcon (AU)	1:26.0956	11
7	34	(Australia) Garth Tander	Garry Rogers Motorsport	Holden Commodore (VX)	1:26.2867	10
8	00	(Australia) Craig Lowndes	Gibson Motorsport	Ford Falcon (AU)	1:26.3214	9
9	600	(Australia) John Bowe	Briggs Motorsport	Ford Falcon (AU)	1:26.3487	8
10	17	(Australia) Steven Johnson	Dick Johnson Racing	Ford Falcon (AU)	1:26.4200	7
11	2	(Australia) Jason Bright	Holden Racing Team	Holden Commodore (VX)	1:26.5112	
12	8	(Australia) Russell Ingall	Perkins Engineering	Holden Commodore (VX)	1:26.5896	
13	6	(New Zealand) Steven Richards	Glenn Seton Racing	Ford Falcon (AU)	1:26.6529	
14	10	(Australia) Mark Larkham	Larkham Motorsport	Ford Falcon (AU)	1:26.7261	
15	11	(Australia) Larry Perkins	Perkins Engineering	Holden Commodore (VX)	1:27.2622	

=== Race 1 ===
Skaife won the holeshot over Greg Murphy to take the lead into the Senna Chicane. Behind them, Dugal McDougall was spun by Cameron McLean at turn four. The stranded McDougall was collected in a nose-to-tail incident that included Paul Weel, Paul Romano and Greg Ritter. Anthony Tratt was also spun around in a separate incident at the same corner. Further up the road, Jason Richards suffered significant damage to the front of his Commodore which ultimately forced him out of the race. The following lap, McLean's engine suffered a catastrophic detonation and pulled off into the escape road at the turn nine hairpin to retire from the race.

As the race settled down, the top three drivers of Skaife, Murphy and Radisich began to break away from the pack. Radisich in particular had begun to apply an enormous amount of pressure to the two ahead of him. On lap eight, Radisich passed Murphy on the approach to turn four in an aggressive move and set off after Skaife in hot pursuit. The following lap, Marcos Ambrose and Todd Kelly collided on the front straight which sent the former into the barriers and forced him out of the race. Somewhat controversially, the stewards adjudicated the collision to be a racing incident and issued no punishment to Kelly. Skaife, who was beginning to struggle with his tyres, continued to defend his lead heavily from Radisich. On lap 16, the two collided on the approach to turn four which sent Skaife into a spin. He would rejoin the race in 16th, behind Dean Canto. Similar to the Kelly/Ambrose incident, the stewards would not penalise Radisich for the contact as they had adjudged the collision to be a racing incident.

"That was the most stupidest thing that I have ever done in motor racing. I was concentrating fully on the dash readout to ensure I didn't exceed the 60kph speed limit in pitlane and I simply drove past my pitbox; that cost me any chance of winning the event."

— Greg Murphy commenting on his pitstop blunder

Murphy came in for his compulsory pitstop on lap 27. However, in the act of intently monitoring his speedometer to ensure he did not exceed the pit-speed limit, he missed his pit box and would be required to cycle around again after having lost an array of positions. Behind him, Skaife took the opportunity of his own misfortunes to complete the first of his pitstops for fuel. Kelly and Garth Tander came to blows later on the same lap which sent the former into a spin while attempting to enter the pitlane. Steven Johnson sustained significant damage to his driver's side door after Kelly had backed into it during the spin. After Rodney Forbes retired from the race at turn five, the safety car was called on lap 38 to retrieve multiple grief-stricken cars across the racetrack.

The race resumed on lap 42 with Bright leading the pack and Radisich being the first on the road to have made both compulsory pitstops. Lowndes began to climb through the pack and on lap 46, passed Radisich for the effective lead of the race into the hairpin. The safety car would be recalled on lap 47 after Murphy's steering rack failed at turn eight, sending him into the wall and out of the race. During this period, John Faulkner was involved in an incident on pitroad where the rear wing of his Commodore haphazardly became tangled with a hose from his pit box gantry. This brought the gantry down onto Mark Larkham's pitbox and injured one of the crew members.

Upon resumption of the race, Lowndes led from Radisich, Ingall, Johnson and Glenn Seton. Radisich's car by this stage had incurred significant overall damage and begun to hinder the cars handling characteristics. He was also suffering with a rehydration issue, depleting him of fluids in a what was a notoriously grueling endurance event. Two further impacts with the wall eventually broke the Watts linkage and forced him to retire from the race. By this time, Lowndes had established a commanding lead over Johnson and Ingall. Even after straying wide at the hairpin toward the end of the race, Lowndes' lead never came under any threat.

"This is great – we didn't expect to win a race so early in the season, so this is a great team victory."

— Craig Lowndes speaking to media after the race

On lap 74, Seton and Bright collided through The Staircase, sending Seton backwards into the tyre barrier, dislodging the rear bumper and throwing it under the car. With this, Seton was unable to drive away and retired on the spot. Up the front, Lowndes remained unchallenged to the flag and thus took his, and Gibson Motorsport's, first win for the Ford brand. Johnson and Ingall rounded out the podium while Skaife finished fourth in a commendable recovery drive. Another notable performance was that of Dean Canto who, despite the limitations of the RPM Racing equipment, finished in the top ten in a lauded drive.

The stewards came under scrutiny after the race after a barrage of incidents throughout the race went unpunished. Along with the Kelly/Ambrose and Skaife/Radisich incidents, the Holden Racing Team pitcrew had also allowed one of Bright's wheels to venture across the pitlane where it was then collected by Larry Perkins. It was stressed before the event that such an offence would result in a drive-through penalty. Instead, the stewards issued the team with a $2000AUD fine. The only driver that did receive punishment of any kind was Jason Bargwanna who had spun John Bowe at the hairpin. For this, Bargwanna was issued a stop-go penalty.

Pos	No	Driver	Team	Car	Laps	Time	Grid	Points
1	00	(Australia) Craig Lowndes	Gibson Motorsport	Ford Falcon (AU)	78	2hr 2min 49.1189sec	8	180
2	17	(Australia) Steven Johnson	Dick Johnson Racing	Ford Falcon (AU)	78	+ 10.20	10	160
3	8	(Australia) Russell Ingall	Perkins Engineering	Holden Commodore (VX)	78	+ 14.33	12	144
4	1	(Australia) Mark Skaife	Holden Racing Team	Holden Commodore (VX)	78	+ 18.96	2	132
5	31	(Australia) Steven Ellery	Steven Ellery Racing	Ford Falcon (AU)	78	+ 23.99	16	124
6	34	(Australia) Garth Tander	Garry Rogers Motorsport	Holden Commodore (VX)	78	+ 29.22	7	116
7	2	(Australia) Jason Bright	Holden Racing Team	Holden Commodore (VX)	78	+ 30.03	11	108
8	600	(Australia) John Bowe	Briggs Motorsport	Ford Falcon (AU)	78	+ 31.25	9	100
9	35	(Australia) Jason Bargwanna	Garry Rogers Motorsport	Holden Commodore (VX)	78	+ 39.26	17	96
10	45	(Australia) Dean Canto	RPM International Racing	Ford Falcon (AU)	78	+ 40.46	20	92
11	10	(Australia) Mark Larkham	Larkham Motorsport	Ford Falcon (AU)	78	+ 45.05	14	88
12	46	(New Zealand) John Faulkner	John Faulkner Racing	Holden Commodore (VT)	78	+ 46.24	23	84
13	54	(Australia) Tony Longhurst	Rod Nash Racing	Holden Commodore (VX)	78	+ 56.19	27	80
14	29	(Australia) Paul Morris	Paul Morris Motorsport	Holden Commodore (VT)	77	+ 1 lap	40	76
15	15	(Australia) Todd Kelly	Tom Walkinshaw Racing Australia	Holden Commodore (VX)	77	+ 1 lap	3	72
16	6	(New Zealand) Steven Richards	Glenn Seton Racing	Ford Falcon (AU)	77	+ 1 lap	13	68
17	11	(Australia) Larry Perkins	Perkins Engineering	Holden Commodore (VX)	77	+ 1 lap	15	64
18	75	(Australia) Anthony Tratt	Paul Little Racing	Ford Falcon (AU)	77	+ 1 lap	29	60
19	16	(Australia) Dugal McDougall	McDougall Motorsport	Holden Commodore (VT)	77	+ 1 lap	21	56
20	50	(Australia) Tyler Mecklem	Clive Wiseman Racing	Holden Commodore (VT)	77	+ 1 lap	30	52
21	23	(Australia) Trevor Ashby	Lansvale Racing Team	Holden Commodore (VS)	76	+ 2 laps	PL	48
22	777	(New Zealand) Angus Fogg	Team Kiwi Racing	Holden Commodore (VT)	76	+ 2 laps	38	44
23	14	(Australia) Greg Ritter	Imrie Motor Sport	Holden Commodore (VX)	74	+ 4 laps	37	40
24	61	(Australia) Ross Halliday	Halliday Motor Sport	Ford Falcon (EL)	73	+ 5 laps	39	36
DNF	5	(Australia) Glenn Seton	Glenn Seton Racing	Ford Falcon (AU)	74	Accident	5	
DNF	76	(Australia) Matthew White	Matthew White Racing	Holden Commodore (VS)	67	Retired	26	
DNF	21	(Australia) Brad Jones	Brad Jones Racing	Ford Falcon (AU)	66	Retired	25	
DNF	43	(Australia) Paul Weel	Paul Weel Racing	Ford Falcon (AU)	64	Retired	33	
DNF	18	(New Zealand) Paul Radisich	Dick Johnson Racing	Ford Falcon (AU)	63	Suspension	4	
DNF	32	(Australia) Tomas Mezera	Tomas Mezera Motorsport	Holden Commodore (VX)	57	Retired	28	
DNF	51	(New Zealand) Greg Murphy	Tom Walkinshaw Racing Australia	Holden Commodore (VX)	47	Steering	1	
DNF	9	(Australia) David Besnard	Stone Brothers Racing	Ford Falcon (AU)	42	Engine	19	
DNF	24	(Australia) Paul Romano	Romano Racing	Holden Commodore (VT)	39	Wheel	32	
DNF	7	(Australia) Rodney Forbes	Gibson Motorsport	Ford Falcon (AU)	37	Accident	22	
DNF	20	(Australia) Garry Holt	Eastern Creek Kart Racing	Ford Falcon (EL)	20	Mechanical	36	
DNF	500	(Australia) Alan Heath	Power Racing	Ford Falcon (AU)	16	Retired	35	
DNF	4	(Australia) Marcos Ambrose	Stone Brothers Racing	Ford Falcon (AU)	8	Accident	6	
DNF	3	(Australia) Cameron McConville	Lansvale Racing Team	Holden Commodore (VX)	4	Retired	24	
DNF	40	(Australia) Cameron McLean	Paragon Motorsport	Ford Falcon (AU)	1	Engine	18	
DNF	021	(New Zealand) Jason Richards	Team Kiwi Racing	Holden Commodore (VT)	0	Accident	31	
Fastest Lap: Jason Bright (Holden Racing Team) - 1:26.7346 on lap 71

=== Race 2 ===
Despite the threat of rain looming at the start of the day, conditions for the race were good. Lowndes kept his lead off the line while Skaife nestled his way into second. At the hairpin on lap one, Steven Ellery collided with Tander after attempting an audacious, and ultimately unsuccessful move. This caused chaos as Tander came nose-to-nose with Ellery, Bowe and Larkham. Canto also found himself trapped in the melee and Bright was forced into the pitlane after sustaining damage to the front-left fender. The damage to Bowe's car was significant to force him out of the race. Up the front, Lowndes began to seek out a commanding lead. Skaife relinquished second and third shortly before safety car was called. A second safety car was soon called after Forbes and Cameron McConville came to blows on lap five.

On lap 21, Paul Morris retired from the race after being overcome by fuel fumes emanating throughout the car. Upon returning to the pitlane, Morris collapsed and was given immediate medical care. Tander lost even more positions after colliding with Canto at the final corner on lap 24. On lap 29, Radisich crashed into the wall at the penultimate corner as a result of a cut tyre. He was able to keep the engine running but was unable to extricate himself from the tyre wall and forced another safety car period. The safety car was out again on lap 37 after Canto suffered a high-speed shunt at turn eight after his brakes failed.

"I was in a hurry to pass Skaife and we were having a good old tussle. He's struggled for pace all weekend but was blocking quite nicely. I had a crack at the inside line on the exit of turn six, heading to turn seven and it didn't come off."

— Craig Lowndes commenting on his crash with Mark Skaife

Despite the calamity of the start, Bright found himself leading the race after having completed both compulsory pitstops. Skaife likewise was enjoying a fruitful race and looked set to make it a Holden Racing Team one-two. However, he spun at turn eight after a fumble with the gearbox and lost a bunch of positions. Lowndes meanwhile was forced to pit after his left-rear tyre was damaged. After a few laps, Lowndes had caught up with Skaife and the two former teammates became locked in battle. The new left-rear tyre on Lowndes' car gave him an edge on pace, exemplified when he set the fastest lap of the race shortly before latching onto the back of Skaife. On lap 59, as they were ascending through The Staircase, Lowndes attempted a criss-cross move on Skaife. However, he clipped the rear of the HRT Commodore, forcing him into a half-spin. Lowndes climbed up the side of the Commodore and the resulting damage forced Lowndes out of the race. Skaife pressed on, albeit with damage to the front-right of the car.

Ingall began to eat into Bright's lead in the dying laps of the race while Johnson passed Seton for third place. Ultimately, Bright maintained a healthy margin to take his first victory aboard a Holden in the V8 Supercar category and in doing so had usurped teammate Skaife as the new championship leader. Ingall and Johnson completed the podium.

Pos	No	Driver	Team	Car	Laps	Time	Grid	Points
1	2	(Australia) Jason Bright	Holden Racing Team	Holden Commodore (VX)	78	2hr 6min 34.5914sec	7	360
2	8	(Australia) Russell Ingall	Perkins Engineering	Holden Commodore (VX)	78	+ 1.25	3	320
3	17	(Australia) Steven Johnson	Dick Johnson Racing	Ford Falcon (AU)	78	+ 16.28	2	288
4	5	(Australia) Glenn Seton	Glenn Seton Racing	Ford Falcon (AU)	78	+ 17.65	25	264
5	15	(Australia) Todd Kelly	Tom Walkinshaw Racing Australia	Holden Commodore (VX)	78	+ 19.16	15	248
6	4	(Australia) Marcos Ambrose	Stone Brothers Racing	Ford Falcon (AU)	78	+ 23.32	36	232
7	6	(New Zealand) Steven Richards	Glenn Seton Racing	Ford Falcon (AU)	78	+ 27.47	16	216
8	11	(Australia) Larry Perkins	Perkins Engineering	Holden Commodore (VX)	78	+ 42.92	17	200
9	1	(Australia) Mark Skaife	Holden Racing Team	Holden Commodore (VX)	78	+ 52.43	4	192
10	51	(New Zealand) Greg Murphy	Tom Walkinshaw Racing Australia	Holden Commodore (VX)	78	+ 53.22	30	184
11	54	(Australia) Tony Longhurst	Rod Nash Racing	Holden Commodore (VX)	78	+ 1:09.44	13	176
12	46	(New Zealand) John Faulkner	John Faulkner Racing	Holden Commodore (VT)	78	+ 1:20.78	12	168
13	23	(Australia) Trevor Ashby	Lansvale Racing Team	Holden Commodore (VS)	77	+ 1 lap	21	160
14	35	(Australia) Jason Bargwanna	Garry Rogers Motorsport	Holden Commodore (VX)	77	+ 1 lap	9	152
15	32	(Australia) Tomas Mezera	Tomas Mezera Motorsport	Holden Commodore (VX)	77	+ 1 lap	29	144
16	021	(New Zealand) Jason Richards	Team Kiwi Racing	Holden Commodore (VT)	77	+ 1 lap	38	136
17	50	(Australia) Tyler Mecklem	Clive Wiseman Racing	Holden Commodore (VT)	77	+ 1 lap	20	128
18	75	(Australia) Anthony Tratt	Paul Little Racing	Ford Falcon (AU)	77	+ 1 lap	18	120
19	34	(Australia) Garth Tander	Garry Rogers Motorsport	Holden Commodore (VX)	76	+ 2 laps	6	112
20	24	(Australia) Paul Romano	Romano Racing	Holden Commodore (VT)	75	+ 3 laps	32	104
21	31	(Australia) Steven Ellery	Steven Ellery Racing	Ford Falcon (AU)	75	+ 3 laps	5	96
22	14	(Australia) Greg Ritter	Imrie Motor Sport	Holden Commodore (VX)	74	+ 4 laps	23	88
23	61	(Australia) Ross Halliday	Halliday Motor Sport	Ford Falcon (EL)	73	+ 5 laps	24	80
24	10	(Australia) Mark Larkham	Larkham Motorsport	Ford Falcon (AU)	72	+ 6 laps	11	72
25	21	(Australia) Brad Jones	Brad Jones Racing	Ford Falcon (AU)	69	+ 9 laps	26	64
26	500	(Australia) Alan Heath	Power Racing	Ford Falcon (AU)	66	+ 12 laps	PL	56
27	20	(Australia) Garry Holt	Eastern Creek Kart Racing	Ford Falcon (EL)	62	+ 16 laps	34	48
NC	18	(New Zealand) Paul Radisich	Dick Johnson Racing	Ford Falcon (AU)	50	Not Classified	28	
DNF	16	(Australia) Dugal McDougall	McDougall Motorsport	Holden Commodore (VT)	71	Wheel	19	
DNF	00	(Australia) Craig Lowndes	Gibson Motorsport	Ford Falcon (AU)	58	Accident	1	
DNF	43	(Australia) Paul Weel	Paul Weel Racing	Ford Falcon (AU)	42	Retired	27	
DNF	777	(New Zealand) Angus Fogg	Team Kiwi Racing	Holden Commodore (VT)	42	Retired	22	
DNF	45	(Australia) Dean Canto	RPM International Racing	Ford Falcon (AU)	37	Accident	10	
DNF	29	(Australia) Paul Morris	Paul Morris Motorsport	Holden Commodore (VT)	21	Exhaustion	14	
DNF	9	(Australia) David Besnard	Stone Brothers Racing	Ford Falcon (AU)	5	Retired	31	
DNF	7	(Australia) Rodney Forbes	Gibson Motorsport	Ford Falcon (AU)	5	Accident	33	
DNF	3	(Australia) Cameron McConville	Lansvale Racing Team	Holden Commodore (VX)	5	Accident	37	
DNF	600	(Australia) John Bowe	Briggs Motorsport	Ford Falcon (AU)	0	Accident	8	
DNS	40	(Australia) Cameron McLean	Paragon Motorsport	Ford Falcon (AU)		Did Not Start		
DNS	76	(Australia) Matthew White	Matthew White Racing	Holden Commodore (VS)		Did Not Start		
Fastest Lap: Craig Lowndes (Gibson Motorsport) - 1:25.8364 on lap 57

== Championship points ==
Round points tally

Pos.	No	Driver	Team	Pts
1	2	(Australia) Jason Bright	Holden Racing Team	468
2	8	(Australia) Russell Ingall	Perkins Engineering	464
3	17	(Australia) Steven Johnson	Dick Johnson Racing	455
4	1	(Australia) Mark Skaife	Holden Racing Team	340
5	15	(Australia) Todd Kelly	Tom Walkinshaw Racing Australia	334

Drivers' Championship standings after Round 2

Pos.	No	Driver	Team	Pts
1	2	(Australia) Jason Bright	Holden Racing Team	703
1	1	(Australia) Mark Skaife	Holden Racing Team	628
3	8	(Australia) Russell Ingall	Perkins Engineering	622
4	17	(Australia) Steven Johnson	Dick Johnson Racing	607
5	15	(Australia) Todd Kelly	Tom Walkinshaw Racing Australia	497

== Aftermath ==
Following a myriad of crashes at turn eight, the corner would be reprofiled for 2002. The chicane would be replaced with a sweeper which would become a staple of the racetrack and notorious for being one of the most challenging in Australian motorsport.
