= Mike Pero =

New Zealand businessman

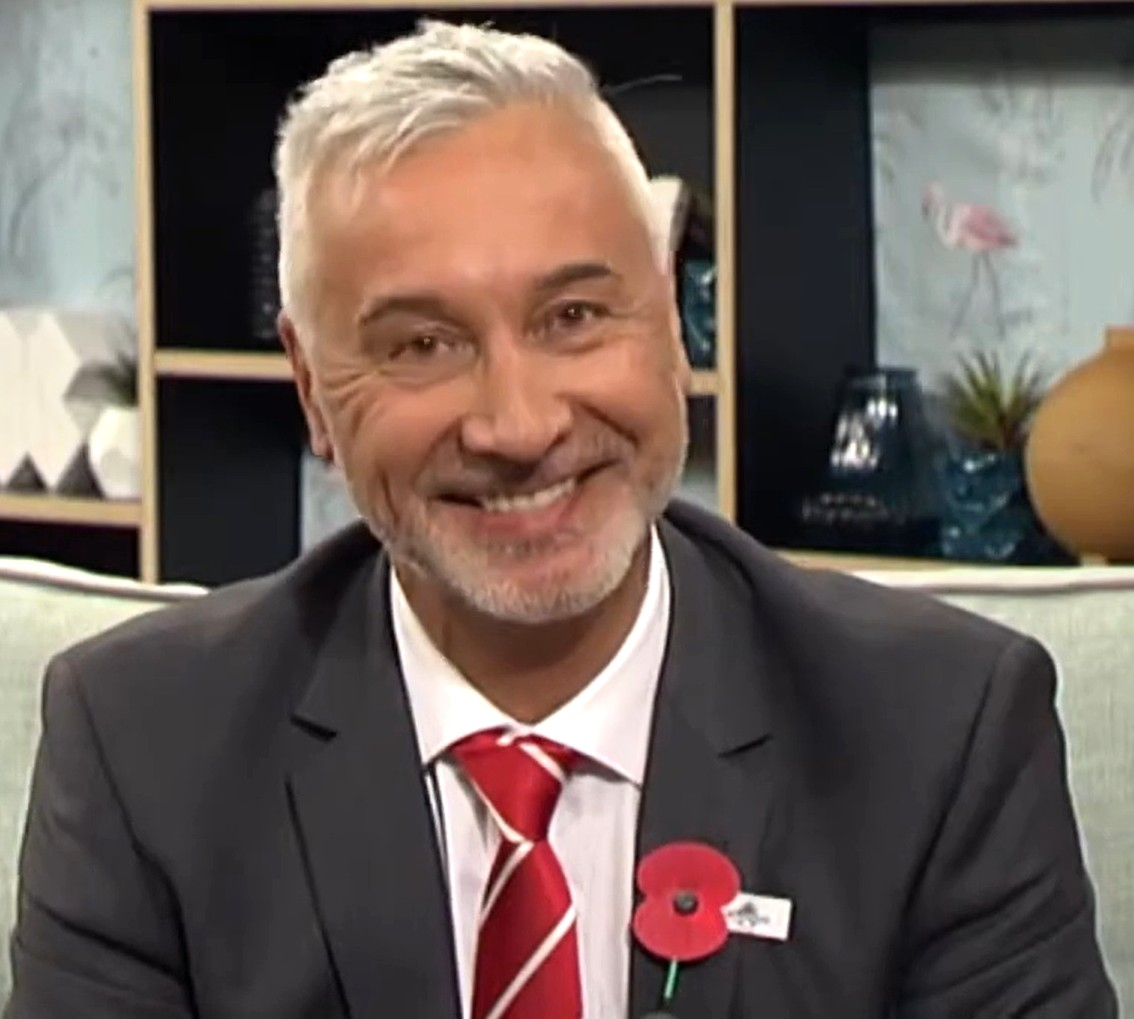
- Pero in 2018
- Born: 26 February 1960 (age 66); Christchurch, New Zealand
- Education: Shirley Boys High School
- Known for: Mortgages; Real Estate; Motorsport
- Television: The Apprentice Aotearoa
- Spouse: Rachel Pero
- Children: Four
- Website: mikepero.co.nz

Michael Pero (born 26 February 1960) is a New Zealand businessman and entrepreneur.

== Professional history ==
Pero founded his mortgage broking business in 1991. In 2011, Pero established a real estate company under the same brand name.

In recent surveys, Colmar Brunton reported that the Pero brand awareness was significantly higher than all other mortgage brokers and most people surveyed considered Mike Pero Mortgages to be New Zealand's most trusted mortgage adviser.

In 1999 and 2003, Pero won the New Zealand Pacific Business Award for categories Business of the Year, and Business Person of the Year.

In 2003, Mike Pero Mortgages was named the Westpac Franchise of the Year. In 2014, Mike Pero Real Estate was ranked 23rd in the Deloitte Fast 50 with 327.8% growth, which placed it 6th in the category of ‘Retail or consumer product’.

Pero was a founding member of the NZ Mortgage Brokers Association and recognised for his services to the Mortgage Broking Industry of New Zealand – he was the first recipient of the Geoff Chong Memorial Trophy in 2005.

Mike Pero Real Estate grew to 60 (approx.) offices across New Zealand located from Invercargill to the far north with over 200 licensed real estate agents. Mike Pero Real Estate was acquired by Raine & Horne on 28 March 2024.

As a community focused company, Mike Pero Real Estate formed the Mike Pero Foundation in 2014. Since then they have helped to raise funds of over $500,000 for the local community.

In February 2017 Pero opened what he believes to be New Zealand's first permanent public display of classic Japanese motorcycles. Mike Pero's Motorcycle Gallery displays more than 60 motorcycles from the 70s, 80s and 90s – loaned from owners and collectors nationwide. Pero hopes that the gallery gives the general public an opportunity to appreciate some classic machines they haven't seen before or have wanted to see again.

In July 2020 during the COVID-19 pandemic, Pero announced plans for a new airline, Pasifika Air, connecting Christchurch and Rarotonga. In June 2021, it was announced that the plans for the airline have been abandoned.

== Personal life ==
Pero was brought up with his two siblings Iain and Shelly in the suburb of Wainoni in Christchurch. His father Tom (Tukaka Te Ariki Pero) was born in Rarotonga, Cook Islands (died 7 December 2012) while his Mother Angela Christine Iwikau (formerly Pero; née Langford) was born in Bath, England 2 August 1940.

Pero is married to Rachel Pero (née Sanchez) and lives in Christchurch. In December 2019 he announced plans to move to the Cook Islands and that he was building a home on family land near Matavera.

=== Sporting achievements ===
Pero was six times National Motorcycle Road Racing Champion, from 1977 to 1982, twice 350cc & 500cc racing class as well as two times in the 410cc Production Series. Pero set the New Zealand land speed record for a 350cc motorcycle in 1979. The record of 238 km/h still stands today.

Pero is patron for Motorcycling New Zealand.

Pero has a strong passion for Motorsport and the Mike Pero Racing Team flies the flag for the brand in the V8 SuperTourers Series with Greg Murphy as the team driver.
