= Kayne Scott =

New Zealand racing driver

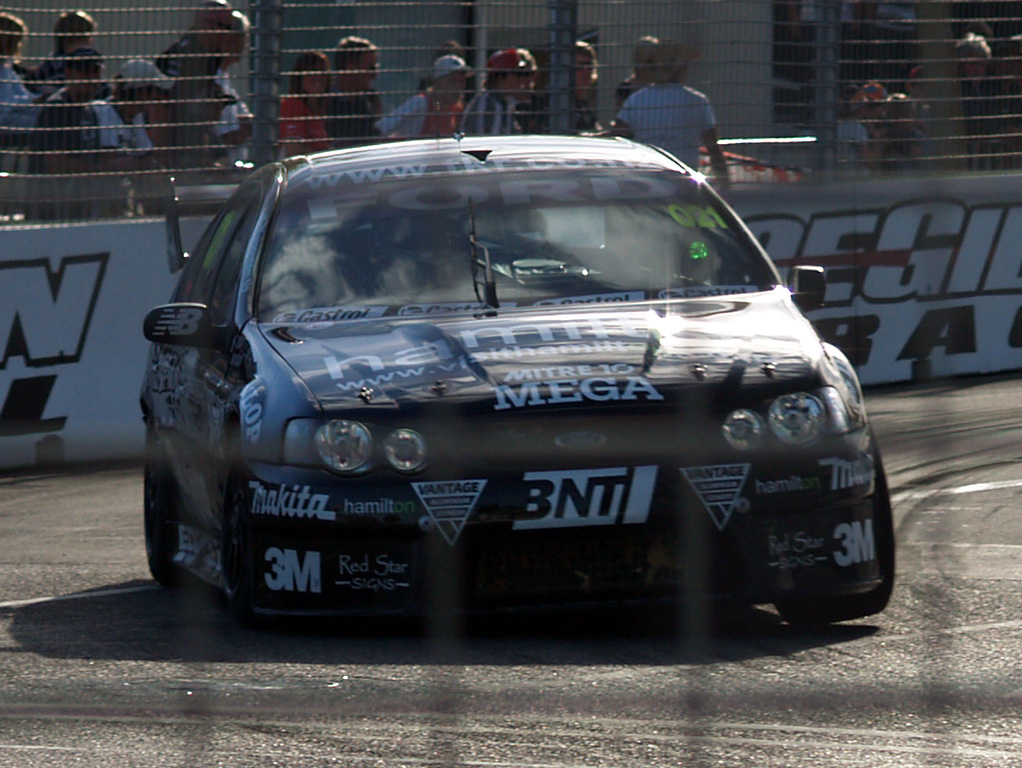
- Nationality: New Zealander

Kayne Scott is a New Zealand racing driver.

== Career ==
Scott started his motorsport career by competing in motocross at the age of 12. Scott is a five time New Zealand Trans-Am champion and won the 2005/06 New Zealand V8s series. He took a seven-year sabbatical from motor racing from 1996 to 2003 for business reasons.

== Family ==
Scott is married to Kelli with three children: Cody, Paris and Jett.

== Team Kiwi Racing ==
Scott has signed with Team Kiwi Racing for the Australian V8 Supercar series. Scott struggled in the poorly funded team and he and endurance race co-driver Chris Pither both chose to leave the team after Bathurst round ten. The string of bad debts and unpaid crew took its toll on all involved.

== Career results ==
Season	Series	Position	Car	Team
1989	New Zealand Touring Car Championship	3rd		
1991	New Zealand Trans-Am	1st		
1992	New Zealand Trans-Am	1st		
1993	New Zealand Trans-Am	1st		
1994	New Zealand Trans-Am	1st		
1995	New Zealand Trans-Am	1st		
2000/01	New Zealand Trans-Am	9th		
2002/03	New Zealand Trans-Am	2nd	Chevrolet Corvette	
2005	V8 Supercar Championship Series	50th	Holden VZ Commodore	Team Dynamik
2005/06	New Zealand V8s Series	1st	Holden VY Commodore	Mark Petch Motorsport
2006	V8 Supercar Championship Series	56th	Holden VZ Commodore	Paul Morris Motorsport
2006	Fujitsu V8 Supercar Series	13th	Holden VZ Commodore	Wollongong Performance Racing
2006/07	New Zealand V8s Series	2nd	Holden VY Commodore	Mark Petch Motorsport
2007	V8 Supercar Championship Series	64th	Holden VE Commodore	Perkins Engineering
2007	Fujitsu V8 Supercar Series	3rd	Holden VZ Commodore	Wollongong Performance Racing
2008	V8 Supercar Championship Series	31st	Ford BF Falcon	Team Kiwi Racing
2008/09	New Zealand V8s Series	1st	Ford BA Falcon	Mark Petch Motorsport
2009/10	New Zealand V8s Series	3rd	Ford BA Falcon	Mark Petch Motorsport
2012	V8SuperTourer	6th	Holden VE Commodore	Bill Farmer's Racing Services
2013	V8SuperTourer	41st	Ford FG Falcon	PS Racing

=== Complete Bathurst 1000 results ===
Year	Team	Car	Co-driver	Position	Laps
1988	[John Sax Racing	BMW M3 E30	(New Zealand) John Sax (New Zealand) John Sorenson	DNF	100
1991	Dick Johnson Racing	Ford Sierra RS500	(New Zealand) Greg Taylor	DNF	90
2005	Team Dynamik	Holden Commodore VZ	(New Zealand) Mark Porter	11th	158
2006	Paul Morris Motorsport	Holden Commodore VZ	(Australia) Alan Gurr	DNF	24
2007	Perkins Engineering	Holden Commodore VE	(Australia) Marcus Marshall	DNF	91
2008	Team Kiwi Racing	Ford Falcon BF	(New Zealand) Chris Pither	DNF	8
