= 2008 Hamilton 400 =

2008 Supercar Championship event

(New Zealand) 2008 Hamilton 400
Event Information
- Round 3 of 14 in the 2008 V8 Supercar Championship Series
- Date: 18–20 April 2008
- Location: Hamilton, New Zealand
- Venue: Hamilton Street Circuit
- Weather: Fine

Results
Race 1
Distance	36 laps	120 km
Pole position	Steven Richards; Ford Performance Racing	1:24.7270
Winner	Garth Tander; Holden Racing Team	1:02:38.9460
Race 2
Distance	36 laps	120 km
Winner	Garth Tander; Holden Racing Team	54:47.9366
Race 3
Distance	36 laps	120 km
Winner	Garth Tander; Holden Racing Team	1:00:27.5864
Round Results
First	Garth Tander; Holden Racing Team	300 pts
Second	Steven Richards; Ford Performance Racing	270 pts
Third	James Courtney; Stone Brothers Racing	252 pts

The 2008 Hamilton 400 was the third round of the 2008 V8 Supercar Championship Series. It was the first V8 Supercar event to be held on the Hamilton Street Circuit and was held on the weekend of 18 to 20 April in Hamilton, New Zealand.

The event was dominated by Garth Tander of the Holden Racing Team. The defending champion won all three races en route to claiming overall round honours and became the inaugural winner of the Mark Porter Memorial Trophy. Throughout the weekend, he was shadowed closely by Steven Richards of Ford Performance Racing who claimed pole position and finished on the podium in all three races.

Championship leader Jamie Whincup was involved in a crash with Todd Kelly during qualifying. Whincup's car could not be repaired in time for any of the remaining races, and as a result, lost the championship lead to Rick Kelly heading into the next round in Perth.

== Background ==
The event was held on the weekend of 18 to 20 April 2008. It was the first V8 Supercar event to be held on the Hamilton Street Circuit, and consisted of three 36 lap races with compulsory pitstops in both instances.

Since 2001, the New Zealand leg of the V8 Supercar championship was held at Pukekohe Park Raceway. While the track was lauded by drivers and fans alike, the facilities were under fire from the AVESCO hierarchy and efforts were made to move the race elsewhere. Planned street circuits in Auckland and Wellington were heavily touted but ultimately fell through.

In November 2006, it was announced that Hamilton had been granted a place on the 2008 schedule with the circuit to be held around the Frankton area. Hamilton mayor Michael Redman projected the event to bring in $20.3 million NZD annually to the region.

The winner of the Hamilton 400 event would be awarded the Mark Porter Memorial Trophy, in memory of Mark Porter. Porter, born in Hamilton, died following a crash in a V8 Supercar Development Series support race to the 2006 Bathurst 1000.

=== Entry list ===
There were 29 drivers entered into this event.

Kayne Scott replaced Chris Pither at Team Kiwi Racing and would remain with the team until the seventh round at Queensland Raceway.

Michael Patrizi made his V8 Supercar debut at this round driving for Ford Rising Stars Racing.

=== Support categories ===
Category	Races	Round winner
New Zealand V8s	3	(New Zealand) John McIntyre (Ford Falcon (BA))
Toyota Racing Series	2	(New Zealand) Earl Bamber (Tatuus TT104ZZ Toyota)
Porsche GT3 Cup	3	(New Zealand) Craig Baird (Porsche 997 GT3)
Mini Challenge	2	(New Zealand) Courtney Letica (Mini Cooper)

== Race report ==
=== Qualifying ===
In front of his home crowd, Steven Richards secured pole position after Tander's last-ditch effort fell five hundredths short. Rick Kelly was third fastest ahead of Stone Brothers Racing driver James Courtney. Crowd favourite, Greg Murphy made a welcome return to the top ten in seventh. Michael Caruso, who has struggled since arriving in the topflight V8 Supercar series, topped one of the practice sessions and backed it up with eighth grid position; three grid slots behind his Garry Rogers Motorsport teammate, Lee Holdsworth. A heavy practice crash limited Round 2 winner Will Davison's progress to 16th.

The most notable incident of the session was that of Jamie Whincup who sustained heavy damage after incurring contact with Todd Kelly at Lion Red Corner. The car was not repairable and the series points leader was reduced to a spectator for the weekend. Triple Eight Race Engineering's miserable weekend was further compounded when Craig Lowndes qualified in 21st position after being caught out by the changeable weather in the first part of qualifying.

Qualifying classification
Pos	No	Name	Team	Car	Time
1	6	(New Zealand) Steven Richards	Ford Performance Racing	Ford Falcon (BF)	1:24.7270
2	1	(Australia) Garth Tander	Holden Racing Team	Holden Commodore (VE)	1:24.7974
3	15	(Australia) Rick Kelly	HSV Dealer Team	Holden Commodore (VE)	1:24.9111
4	4	(Australia) James Courtney	Stone Brothers Racing	Ford Falcon (BF)	1:24.9289
5	33	(Australia) Lee Holdsworth	Garry Rogers Motorsport	Holden Commodore (VE)	1:25.0264
6	14	(Australia) Cameron McConville	Brad Jones Racing	Holden Commodore (VE)	1:25.0338
7	51	(New Zealand) Greg Murphy	Tasman Motorsport	Holden Commodore (VE)	1:25.0387
8	34	(Australia) Michael Caruso	Garry Rogers Motorsport	Holden Commodore (VE)	1:25.5047
9	2	(Australia) Mark Skaife	Holden Racing Team	Holden Commodore (VE)	1:25.5638
10	111	(New Zealand) Fabian Coulthard	Paul Cruickshank Racing	Ford Falcon (BF)	1:25.5755
11	88	(Australia) Jamie Whincup	Triple Eight Race Engineering	Ford Falcon (BF)	1:25.8686
12	9	(New Zealand) Shane van Gisbergen	Stone Brothers Racing	Ford Falcon (BF)	1:25.8921
13	5	(Australia) Mark Winterbottom	Ford Performance Racing	Ford Falcon (BF)	1:25.9384
14	12	(Australia) Andrew Jones	Brad Jones Racing	Holden Commodore (VE)	1:26.0055
15	25	(Australia) Jason Bright	Britek Motorsport	Ford Falcon (BF)	1:26.1540
16	18	(Australia) Will Davison	Dick Johnson Racing	Ford Falcon (BF)	1:26.3173
17	11	(Australia) Shane Price	Perkins Engineering	Holden Commodore (VE)	1:26.4035
18	17	(Australia) Steven Johnson	Dick Johnson Racing	Ford Falcon (BF)	1:26.5019
19	7	(Australia) Todd Kelly	Perkins Engineering	Holden Commodore (VE)	1:26.5241
20	50	(Australia) Andrew Thompson	Paul Weel Racing	Holden Commodore (VE)	1:26.9382
21	888	(Australia) Craig Lowndes	Triple Eight Race Engineering	Ford Falcon (BF)	1:32.9566
22	39	(Australia) Russell Ingall	Paul Morris Motorsport	Holden Commodore (VE)	1:32.9753
23	16	(Australia) Paul Dumbrell	HSV Dealer Team	Holden Commodore (VE)	1:33.3609
24	67	(Australia) Paul Morris	Paul Morris Motorsport	Holden Commodore (VE)	1:33.7532
25	3	(New Zealand) Jason Richards	Tasman Motorsport	Holden Commodore (VE)	1:33.7563
26	26	(Australia) Marcus Marshall	Britek Motorsport	Ford Falcon (BF)	1:34.0816
27	777	(Australia) Michael Patrizi	Ford Rising Stars Racing	Ford Falcon (BF)	1:34.1202
28	021	(New Zealand) Kayne Scott	Team Kiwi Racing	Ford Falcon (BF)	1:34.9871
29	55	(Australia) Tony D'Alberto	Rod Nash Racing	Holden Commodore (VE)	1:35.2007

Notes:

- Jamie Whincup originally qualified 11th, but was not able to start the race due to a big crash during qualifying.

=== Race 1 ===
Garth Tander en route to victory.

Mark Winterbottom and Shane van Gisbergen collided with each other off the start line while Greg Murphy was spun around by Mark Skaife at the exit of turn one. The chaos continued into turn two when Van Gisbergen locked up while Russell Ingall went down the inside of Steven Johnson which caused a collision collecting Paul Morris, Shane Price, Michael Patrizi, Johnson and Lowndes. Johnson, Price and Ingall retired to the pits.

Steven Richards ran wide at turn five, relinquishing the lead to Tander and gave second place to Rick Kelly. The safety car was deployed until the end of lap five but was promptly re-established when Patrizi found himself stranded at turn seven. Most of the drivers pulled into the pitlane with the exception of Skaife. This decision, forced by the Holden Racing Team's decision to pit Tander first, would cost Skaife dearly later in the race. Racing resumed on lap 11.

Jason Richards and Lowndes were both issued drive through penalties for pitlane infringements after Murphy pulled into pitlane with a broken steering plate. Murphy returned to the track two laps later and Morris would join him soon after. Skaife finally pitted on lap 20 but the damage had been done and fell well down the order. Michael Caruso also suffered a spin, sending him down the battle pack. Lowndes entered pitlane on lap 26 for a flat tyre when he clipped the tyre bundle at turn four. Andrew Jones pulled into the garage to retire at lap 30. Van Gisbergen also pitted on lap 33 for some damage and was subsequently lapped.

Tander managed to keep the chasing pack at arms length and secured victory ahead of Rick Kelly and Steven Richards.

Race 1 classification
Pos	No	Name	Team	Vehicle	Laps	Time/Retired	Grid	Points
1	1	(Australia) Garth Tander	Holden Racing Team	Holden Commodore (VE)	36	1:02:38.9460	2	100
2	15	(Australia) Rick Kelly	HSV Dealer Team	Holden Commodore (VE)	36	+ 1.118	3	92
3	6	(New Zealand) Steven Richards	Ford Performance Racing	Ford Falcon (BF)	36	+ 1.547	1	86
4	4	(Australia) James Courtney	Stone Brothers Racing	Ford Falcon (BF)	36	+ 2.358	4	80
5	33	(Australia) Lee Holdsworth	Garry Rogers Motorsport	Holden Commodore (VE)	36	+ 3.107	5	74
6	14	(Australia) Cameron McConville	Brad Jones Racing	Holden Commodore (VE)	36	+ 5.016	6	68
7	111	(New Zealand) Fabian Coulthard	Paul Cruickshank Racing	Ford Falcon (BF)	36	+ 8.857	10	64
8	7	(Australia) Todd Kelly	Perkins Engineering	Holden Commodore (VE)	36	+ 16.707	19	60
9	18	(Australia) Will Davison	Dick Johnson Racing	Ford Falcon (BF)	36	+ 21.394	16	56
10	5	(Australia) Mark Winterbottom	Ford Performance Racing	Ford Falcon (BF)	36	+ 22.407	13	52
11	25	(Australia) Jason Bright	Britek Motorsport	Ford Falcon (BF)	36	+ 36.203	15	48
12	34	(Australia) Michael Caruso	Garry Rogers Motorsport	Holden Commodore (VE)	36	+ 38.331	8	46
13	55	(Australia) Tony D'Alberto	Rod Nash Racing	Holden Commodore (VE)	36	+ 38.498	29	44
14	16	(Australia) Paul Dumbrell	HSV Dealer Team	Holden Commodore (VE)	36	+ 44.764	23	42
15	50	(Australia) Andrew Thompson	Paul Weel Racing	Holden Commodore (VE)	36	+ 44.983	20	40
16	26	(Australia) Marcus Marshall	Britek Motorsport	Ford Falcon (BF)	36	+ 46.923	26	38
17	021	(New Zealand) Kayne Scott	Team Kiwi Racing	Ford Falcon (BF)	36	+ 48.802	28	36
18	2	(Australia) Mark Skaife	Holden Racing Team	Holden Commodore (VE)	36	+ 57.893	9	34
19	888	(Australia) Craig Lowndes	Triple Eight Race Engineering	Ford Falcon (BF)	35	+ 1 lap	21	32
20	3	(New Zealand) Jason Richards	Tasman Motorsport	Holden Commodore (VE)	35	+ 1 lap	25	30
21	9	(New Zealand) Shane van Gisbergen	Stone Brothers Racing	Ford Falcon (BF)	35	+1 lap	12	28
22	12	(Australia) Andrew Jones	Brad Jones Racing	Holden Commodore (VE)	34	+ 2 laps	14	26
23	51	(New Zealand) Greg Murphy	Tasman Motorsport	Holden Commodore (VE)	32	+ 4 laps	7	24
24	67	(Australia) Paul Morris	Paul Morris Motorsport	Holden Commodore (VE)	28	+ 8 laps	24	22
Ret	777	(Australia) Michael Patrizi	Ford Rising Stars Racing	Ford Falcon (BF)	4	Accident	27	
Ret	17	(Australia) Steven Johnson	Dick Johnson Racing	Ford Falcon (BF)	1	Accident	18	
Ret	11	(Australia) Shane Price	Perkins Engineering	Holden Commodore (VE)	1	Accident	17	
Ret	39	(Australia) Russell Ingall	Paul Morris Motorsport	Holden Commodore (VE)	1	Accident	22	
DNS	88	(Australia) Jamie Whincup	Triple Eight Race Engineering	Ford Falcon (BF)		Did not start		
Fastest Lap: Greg Murphy (Tasman Motorsport) - 1:25.5362 on lap 15

=== Race 2 ===
Tander kept the lead off the line and established the pace by consistently laying down the fastest lap of the race early on. Multiple cars incurred damage in the opening lap melee, but it proved to be an otherwise unchaotic start to the event with no retirements.

On the second lap, Shane Price and Marcus Marshall were involved in an awkward incident when Price locked the front-right tyre whilst attempting to pass Marshall into turn two. Price strayed wide and stopped just short of the concrete wall on the exit of the corner. Marshall was caught out immediately in behind him, causing him to brake heavily. Neither car sustained damage and continued on.

Russell Ingall retired from the race due to clutch issues.

By lap seven, the pit window opened and multiple front-runners elected to undertake their compulsory pitstops. Tander would pit one lap later while Kelly and Richards would make their pitstops the following lap. Confusion ensued at Dick Johnson Racing when an issue with Will Davison's starting motor cable saw Steven Johnson trapped behind his teammate in his pit stall. Davison's car was pushed forward to free Johnson while Davison himself rejoined two laps behind the leader. Russell Ingall was beginning to suffer car issues with diminishing brakes and a slipping clutch. Greg Murphy's race was curtailed after hitting the tyre bundles at the back straight chicane. He pitted for repairs and lost a bundle of laps as a result. Todd Kelly also incurred damage at the same section of the racetrack but elected to trundle around until the end of the race. At the same time, Van Gisbergen slowed dramatically and elected to pit to change both front tyres as a precaution. At this point, debris on the track had prompted the redeployment of the safety car.

Racing resumed on lap 27 and immediately chaos ensued when Skaife was spun by Andrew Thompson heading into turn one. Damage inflicted on Thompson's car was terminal and his race was over. For the second day in succession, Patrizi crashed at BigPond Corner. Todd Kelly would follow him one lap later. Van Gisbergen had begun to circulate slowly while Shane Price entered the pitlane to rectify issues. Ingall was out of the race with the clutch having finally given up the ghost five laps from home. Steven Richards had begun to slowly eek into Tander's lead but ultimately ran out of laps as the Holden Racing Team driver made it two wins from two races. Alongside Richards, James Courtney rounded out the podium after Rick Kelly fell away from the podium with steering issues.

Race 2 classification
Pos	No	Name	Team	Vehicle	Laps	Time/Retired	Grid	Points
1	1	(Australia) Garth Tander	Holden Racing Team	Holden Commodore (VE)	36	54:47.9366	1	100
2	6	(New Zealand) Steven Richards	Ford Performance Racing	Ford Falcon (BF)	36	+ 0.789	3	94
3	4	(Australia) James Courtney	Stone Brothers Racing	Ford Falcon (BF)	36	+ 5.633	4	88
4	33	(Australia) Lee Holdsworth	Garry Rogers Motorsport	Holden Commodore (VE)	36	+ 7.242	5	80
5	14	(Australia) Cameron McConville	Brad Jones Racing	Holden Commodore (VE)	36	+ 9.833	6	74
6	15	(Australia) Rick Kelly	HSV Dealer Team	Holden Commodore (VE)	36	+ 10.866	2	68
7	5	(Australia) Mark Winterbottom	Ford Performance Racing	Ford Falcon (BF)	36	+ 11.972	10	64
8	111	(New Zealand) Fabian Coulthard	Paul Cruickshank Racing	Ford Falcon (BF)	36	+ 12.319	7	60
9	3	(New Zealand) Jason Richards	Tasman Motorsport	Holden Commodore (VE)	36	+ 14.098	20	56
10	55	(Australia) Tony D'Alberto	Rod Nash Racing	Holden Commodore (VE)	36	+ 15.144	13	52
11	16	(Australia) Paul Dumbrell	HSV Dealer Team	Holden Commodore (VE)	36	+ 16.416	14	48
12	25	(Australia) Jason Bright	Britek Motorsport	Ford Falcon (BF)	36	+ 19.148	11	46
13	17	(Australia) Steven Johnson	Dick Johnson Racing	Ford Falcon (BF)	36	+ 19.447	26	44
14	888	(Australia) Craig Lowndes	Triple Eight Race Engineering	Ford Falcon (BF)	36	+ 23.116	19	42
15	12	(Australia) Andrew Jones	Brad Jones Racing	Holden Commodore (VE)	36	+ 25.875	22	40
16	26	(Australia) Marcus Marshall	Britek Motorsport	Ford Falcon (BF)	36	+ 30.062	16	38
17	67	(Australia) Paul Morris	Paul Morris Motorsport	Holden Commodore (VE)	36	+ 35.542	24	36
18	34	(Australia) Michael Caruso	Garry Rogers Motorsport	Holden Commodore (VE)	36	+ 41.030	12	34
19	7	(Australia) Todd Kelly	Perkins Engineering	Holden Commodore (VE)	36	+ 41.176	8	32
20	021	(New Zealand) Kayne Scott	Team Kiwi Racing	Ford Falcon (BF)	35	+ 1 lap	17	30
21	777	(Australia) Michael Patrizi	Ford Rising Stars Racing	Ford Falcon (BF)	35	+ 1 lap	25	28
22	18	(Australia) Will Davison	Dick Johnson Racing	Ford Falcon (BF)	34	+ 2 laps	9	26
23	2	(Australia) Mark Skaife	Holden Racing Team	Holden Commodore (VE)	34	+ 2 laps	18	24
24	11	(Australia) Shane Price	Perkins Engineering	Holden Commodore (VE)	34	+ 2 laps	27	22
25	51	(New Zealand) Greg Murphy	Tasman Motorsport	Holden Commodore (VE)	31	+ 5 laps	23	20
26	9	(New Zealand) Shane van Gisbergen	Stone Brothers Racing	Ford Falcon (BF)	30	+ 6 laps	21	18
Ret	39	(Australia) Russell Ingall	Paul Morris Motorsport	Holden Commodore (VE)	31	Clutch	28	
Ret	50	(Australia) Andrew Thompson	Paul Weel Racing	Holden Commodore (VE)	28	Accident	15	
DNS	88	(Australia) Jamie Whincup	Triple Eight Race Engineering	Ford Falcon (BF)		Did not start		
Fastest Lap: Garth Tander (Holden Racing Team) - 1:24.9264 on lap 11

=== Race 3 ===
Andrew Thompson was ruled a non-starter after incurring a differential issue before the start of the race.

Tander won the holeshot once again as Richards bogged down off the start, losing multiple positions. Behind them, trouble ensued as Todd Kelly and Marcus Marshall came to blows on the inside of turn one. Lee Holdsworth caught both pedals on the entry into the chicane and after clipping the tyre barriers, was ricocheted into the concrete wall and immediately was rendered out of the race. Later in the lap, Tony D'Alberto was pitched into a spin by Jason Richards at ITM Corner and sustained heavy damage to the rear of his car that would see him retire from the race.

The race resumed on lap four but further drama was yet to unfold. At turn two, Marshall attempted to pass Todd Kelly, mounting the inside kerb and making contact with the side of Kelly's car in the process. On the exit of the corner, Marshall crowded Kelly and the subsequent contact pitched Marshall into a spin and into the wall. Kelly would subsequently be penalised for his role in the incident. In the trouble, Will Davison clipped the rear of Kelly's car and caused significant damage to the front-left corner of the car. Behind them, Shane Price and Michael Caruso found themselves into the tyre barrier at turn two. The safety car was briefly deployed before coming in just one lap later.

Greg Murphy's weekend came to an end when contact with the chicane tyre bundles destroyed the front-left suspension. Tasman Motorsport's day was not made much better with news of a drive-through penalty for Jason Richards for his role in Tony D'Alberto's accident. After completing his pitstop, the bonnet pins on Davison's car failed, flicked the bonnet up and cracked his windscreen. He continued to circulate but eventually retired a few laps later, pulling off in the escape road at ITM Corner due to a mechanical failure. Paul Morris was issued a drive-through penalty for a driving infringement. Van Gisbergen was the last of the drivers to pit, relinquishing the lead to Tander on lap 22. Jason Bright's quiet weekend was jarred by an inexplicable spin at Lion Red Corner.

On lap 25, the safety car was called after Paul Dumbrell became stranded on the exit of turn three following contact with Cameron McConville on the entry to turn two. McConville was issued a penalty for his role in the incident. The race resumed on lap 29 and Tander once again established a firm lead over the field. Down the pack, Patrizi made contact with the rear of Jason Richards' car on the exit of turn one but both managed to keep driving. Kayne Scott crashed at turn three and became stranded as a result. Regardless, the safety car was not deployed with race director Tim Schenken electing to let the race run green to the finish. Tander would remain untroubled to the line to win the third and final race ahead of Richards in second and Courtney in third.

Race 3 classification
Pos	No	Name	Team	Vehicle	Laps	Time/Retired	Grid	Points
1	1	(Australia) Garth Tander	Holden Racing Team	Holden Commodore (VE)	36	1:00:27.5864	1	100
2	6	(New Zealand) Steven Richards	Ford Performance Racing	Ford Falcon (BF)	36	+ 1.163	2	92
3	4	(Australia) James Courtney	Stone Brothers Racing	Ford Falcon (BF)	36	+ 3.945	3	86
4	15	(Australia) Rick Kelly	HSV Dealer Team	Holden Commodore (VE)	36	+ 6.715	6	80
5	5	(Australia) Mark Winterbottom	Ford Performance Racing	Ford Falcon (BF)	36	+ 7.053	7	74
6	111	(New Zealand) Fabian Coulthard	Paul Cruickshank Racing	Ford Falcon (BF)	36	+ 8.728	8	68
7	888	(Australia) Craig Lowndes	Triple Eight Race Engineering	Ford Falcon (BF)	36	+ 8.904	14	64
8	17	(Australia) Steven Johnson	Dick Johnson Racing	Ford Falcon (BF)	36	+ 9.362	13	60
9	12	(Australia) Andrew Jones	Brad Jones Racing	Holden Commodore (VE)	36	+ 10.897	15	56
10	9	(New Zealand) Shane van Gisbergen	Stone Brothers Racing	Ford Falcon (BF)	36	+ 11.334	26	52
11	39	(Australia) Russell Ingall	Paul Morris Motorsport	Holden Commodore (VE)	36	+ 12.964	27	48
12	2	(Australia) Mark Skaife	Holden Racing Team	Holden Commodore (VE)	36	+ 13.802	23	46
13	25	(Australia) Jason Bright	Britek Motorsport	Ford Falcon (BF)	36	+ 14.804	12	44
14	3	(New Zealand) Jason Richards	Tasman Motorsport	Holden Commodore (VE)	36	+ 15.130	9	42
15	7	(Australia) Todd Kelly	Perkins Engineering	Holden Commodore (VE)	36	+ 15.595	19	40
16	11	(Australia) Shane Price	Perkins Engineering	Holden Commodore (VE)	36	+ 18.950	24	38
17	34	(Australia) Michael Caruso	Garry Rogers Motorsport	Holden Commodore (VE)	36	+ 19.246	18	36
18	67	(Australia) Paul Morris	Paul Morris Motorsport	Holden Commodore (VE)	36	+ 21.960	17	34
19	777	(Australia) Michael Patrizi	Ford Rising Stars Racing	Ford Falcon (BF)	36	+ 30.906	21	32
20	14	(Australia) Cameron McConville	Brad Jones Racing	Holden Commodore (VE)	36	+ 35.084	5	30
Ret	021	(New Zealand) Kayne Scott	Team Kiwi Racing	Ford Falcon (BF)	33	Accident	20	
Ret	16	(Australia) Paul Dumbrell	HSV Dealer Team	Holden Commodore (VE)	23	Accident	11	
Ret	18	(Australia) Will Davison	Dick Johnson Racing	Ford Falcon (BF)	9	Mechanical	22	
Ret	51	(New Zealand) Greg Murphy	Tasman Motorsport	Holden Commodore (VE)	7	Accident damage	25	
Ret	26	(Australia) Marcus Marshall	Britek Motorsport	Ford Falcon (BF)	4	Accident damage	16	
Ret	55	(Australia) Tony D'Alberto	Rod Nash Racing	Holden Commodore (VE)	1	Accident	10	
Ret	33	(Australia) Lee Holdsworth	Garry Rogers Motorsport	Holden Commodore (VE)	0	Accident	4	
DNS	50	(Australia) Andrew Thompson	Paul Weel Racing	Holden Commodore (VE)		Did not start		
DNS	88	(Australia) Jamie Whincup	Triple Eight Race Engineering	Ford Falcon (BF)		Did not start		
Fastest Lap: Garth Tander (Holden Racing Team) - 1:24.5825 on lap 11

== Championship standings ==
After round 3 of 14

Pos	No	Name	Team	Points
1	15	(Australia) Rick Kelly	HSV Dealer Team	672
2	1	(Australia) Garth Tander	Holden Racing Team	626
3	33	(Australia) Lee Holdsworth	Garry Rogers Motorsport	580
4	5	(Australia) Mark Winterbottom	Ford Performance Racing	572
5	88	(Australia) Jamie Whincup	Triple Eight Race Engineering	540
