= Todd Kelly =

Australian racing driver

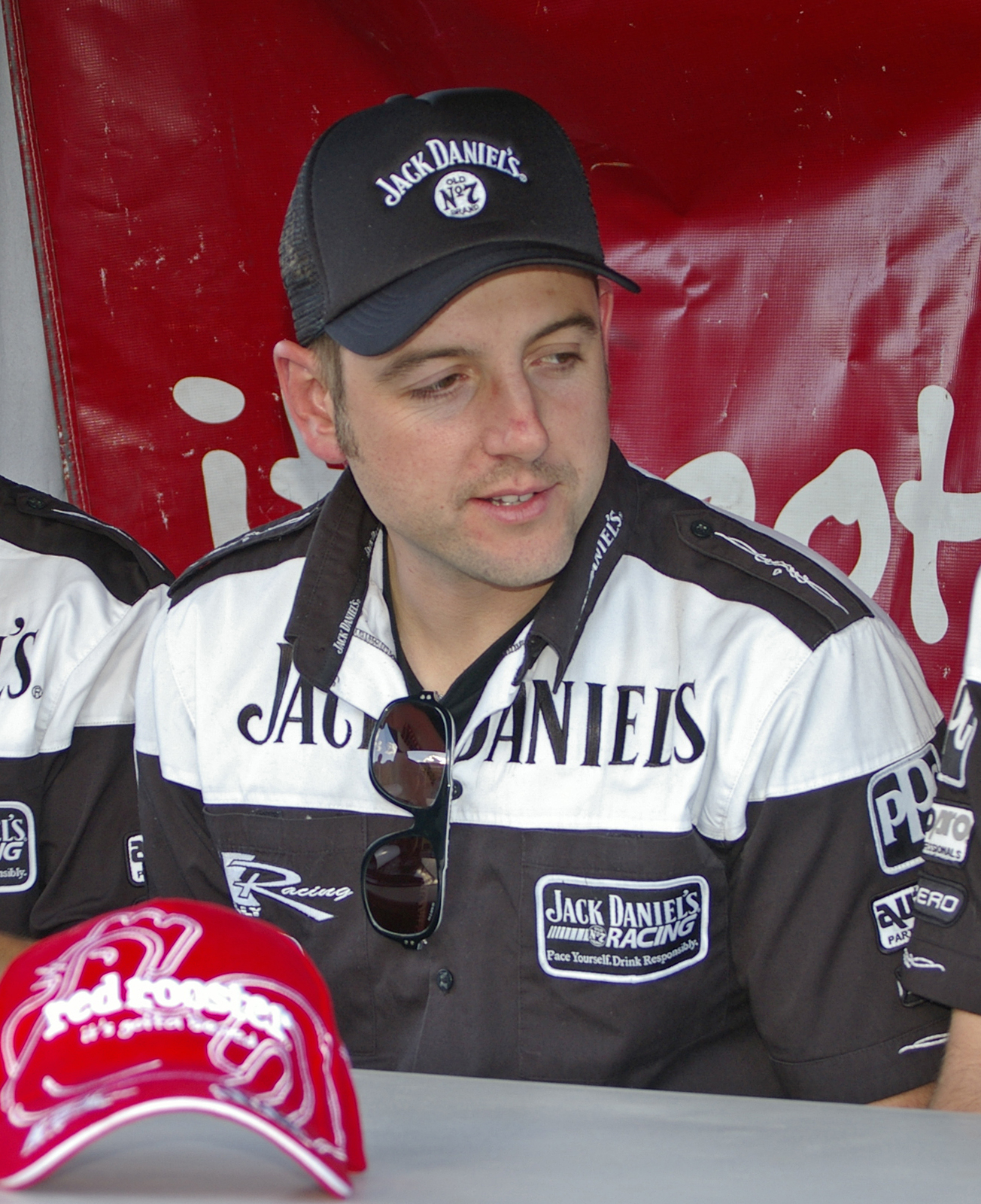
- Todd Kelly in 2009
- Nationality: Australian
- Born: Todd Evan Kelly; 9 October 1979 (age 47) Melbourne, Victoria, Australia
- Categorisation: FIA Gold

Supercars Championship career
- Championships: 0
- Races: 541
- Wins: 19
- Podiums: 58
- Pole positions: 7

Todd Evan Kelly (born 9 October 1979) is a retired Australian professional racing driver who competed in the Virgin Australia Supercars Championship. He is the older brother of fellow Supercars driver and former Bathurst 1000 winner, Rick Kelly. He drove for the Holden Racing Team from 2003 until 2007, and Perkins Engineering in 2008. Since 2009, he has been with his family team Kelly Racing (now known as Kelly Grove Racing). He is the youngest driver to have reached 100 starts in the series.

== Supercars Championship ==
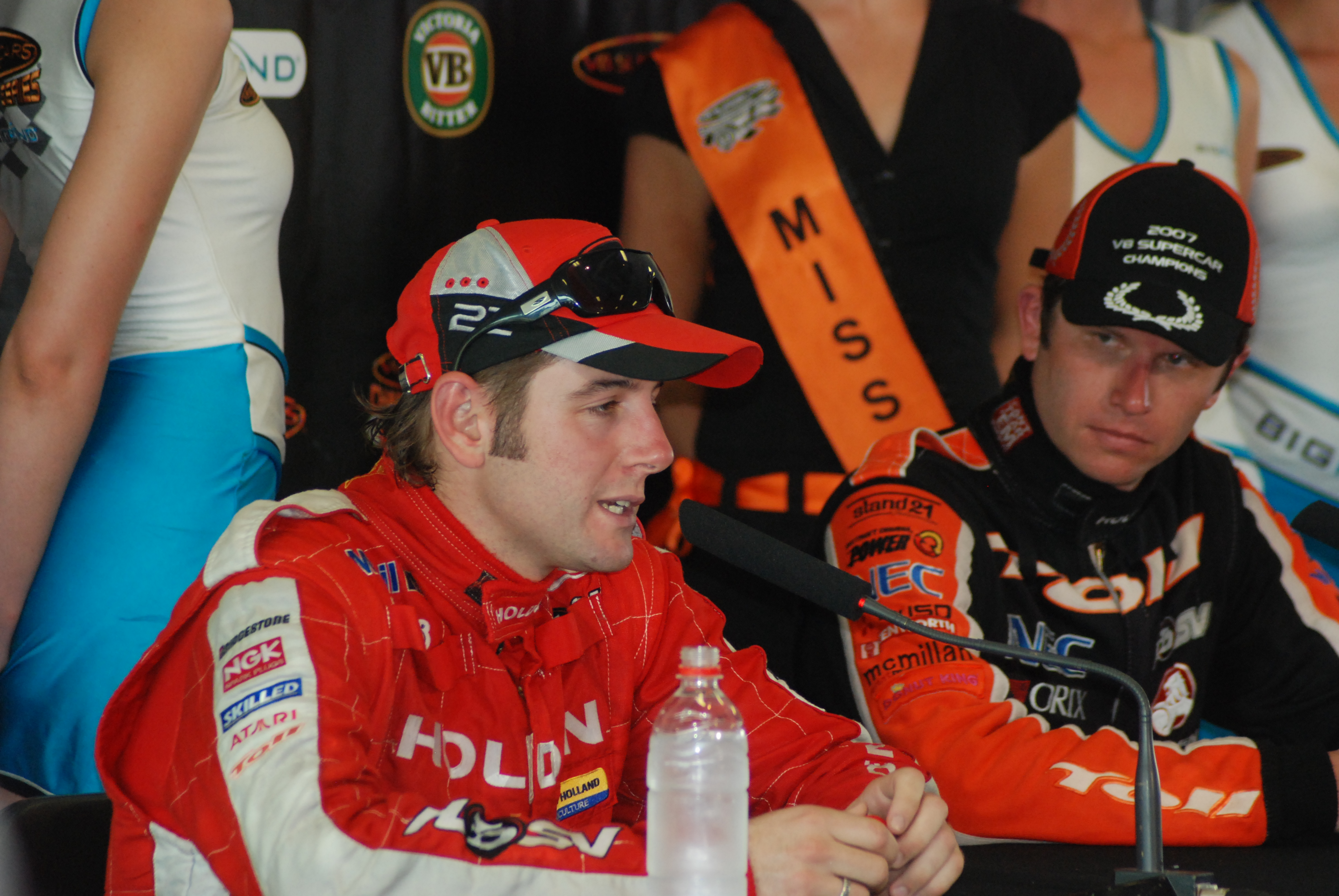
Todd Kelly (left) and Garth Tander at a press conference in 2007

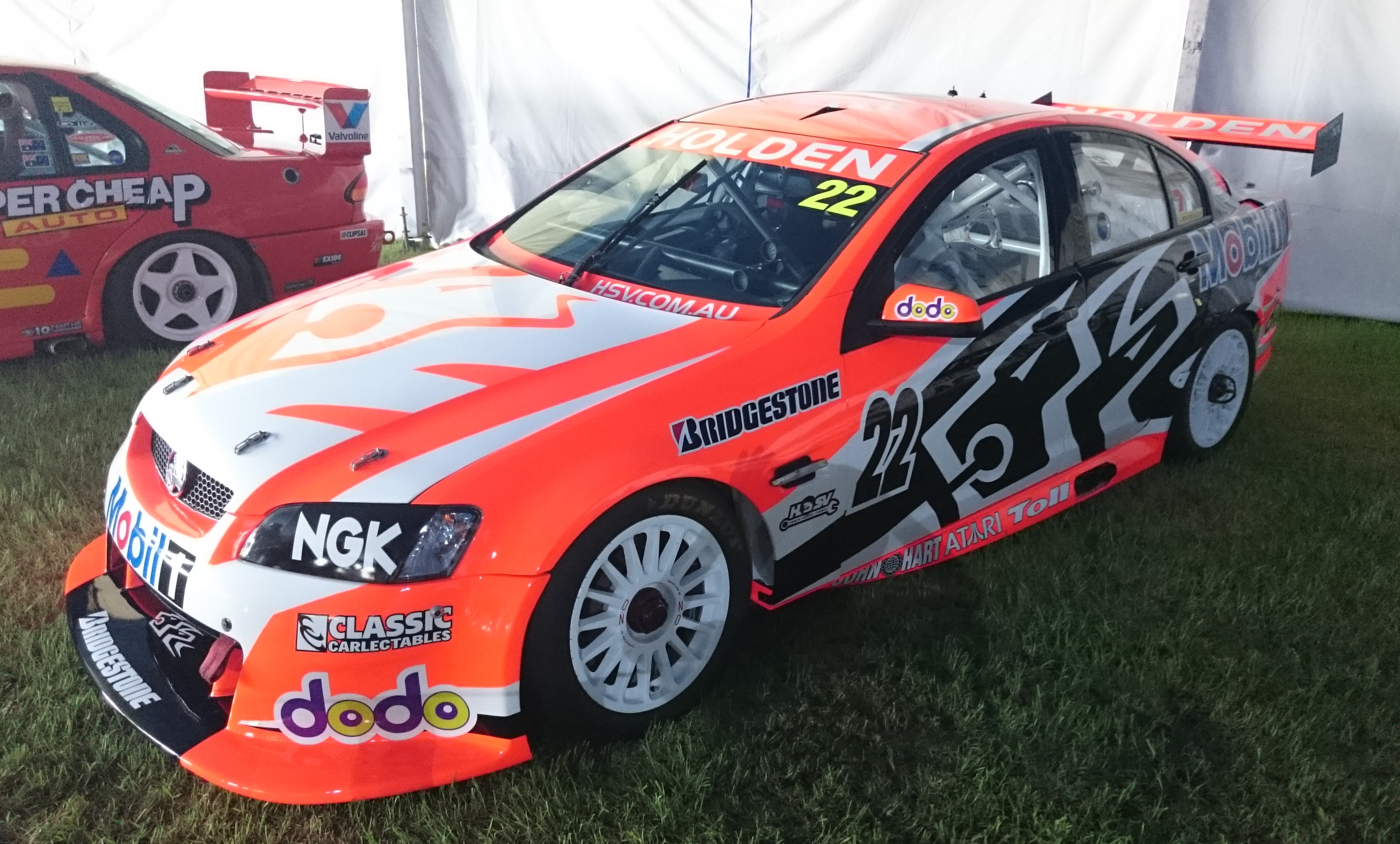
The Holden Commodore (VE) in which Kelly placed 6th in the 2007 V8 Supercar Championship Series. The car is pictured in 2018.

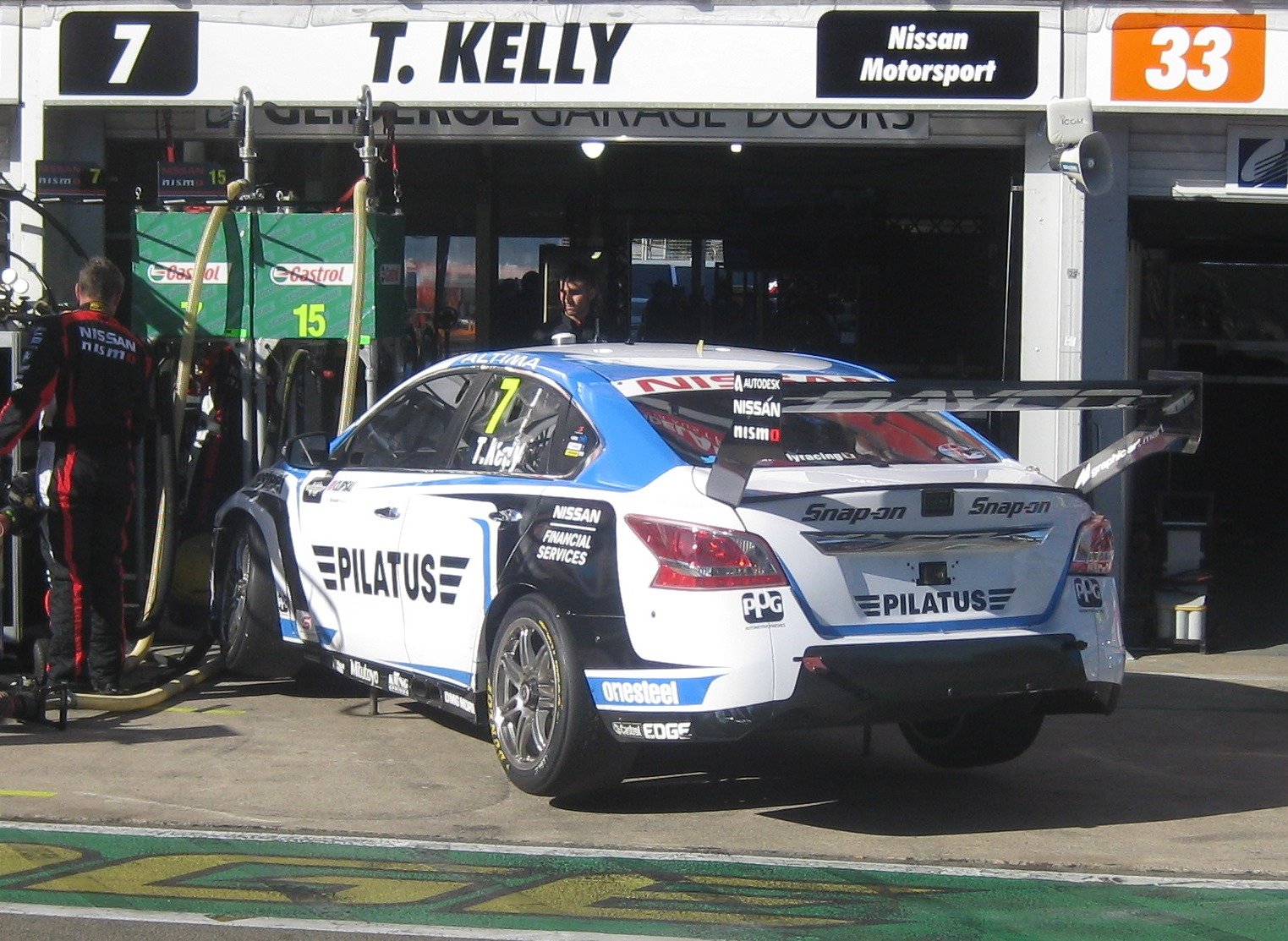
The Nissan Altima L33 of Todd Kelly at the 2015 Clipsal 500 Adelaide

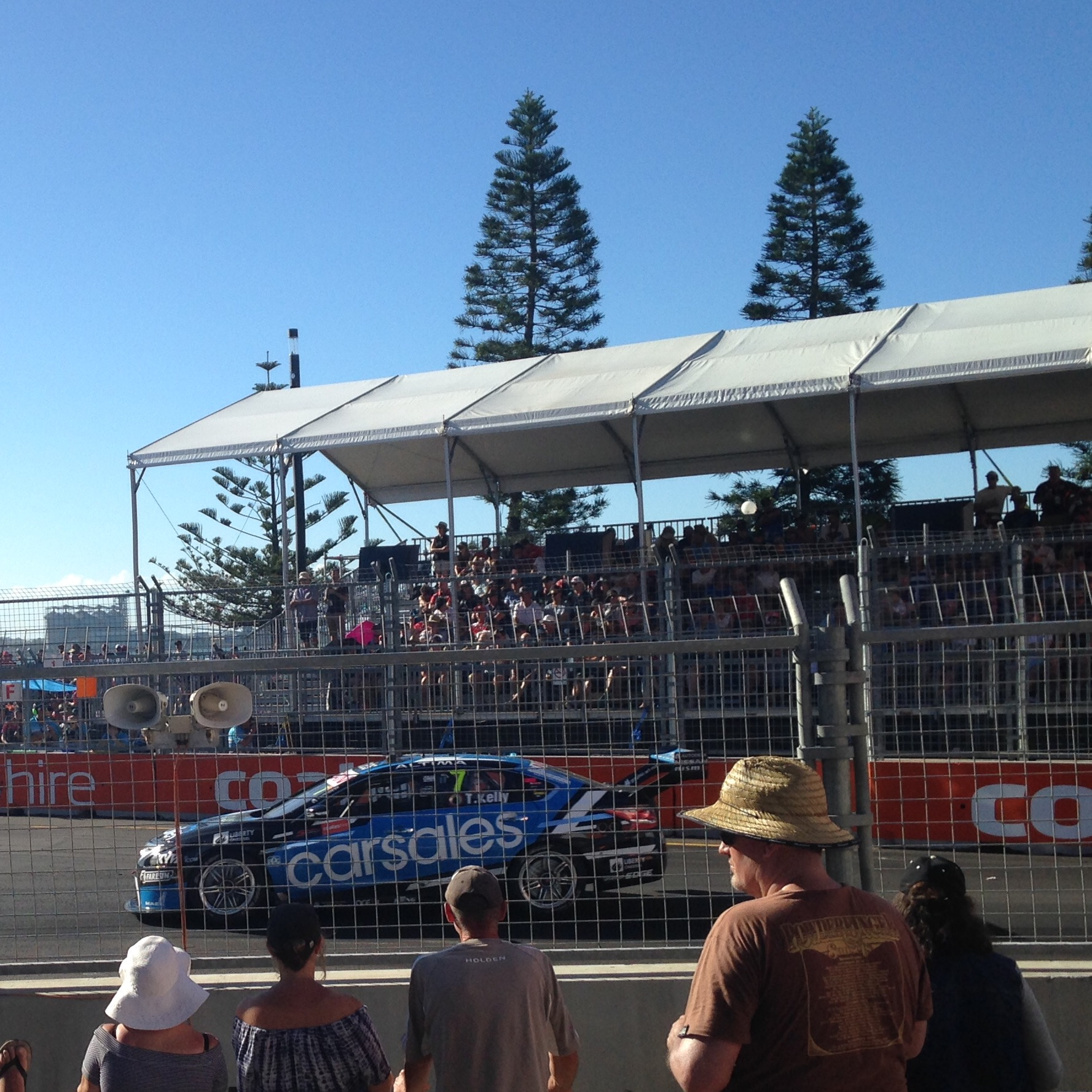
Kelly at his final Supercars event, the 2017 Coates Hire Newcastle 500

Season 2001 was Kelly's first full-time season in V8 Supercars (although he had previously raced in the category in 99' and 00'), he drove for the K-Mart Racing Team alongside Greg Murphy. He and Greg finished 3rd at Bathurst. He finished his first full season in 6th and broke through for his first-round victory in the last round of the season at Sandown Raceway. Season 2002 saw him take four second places, and fifth in the championship.

After two successful years with K-Mart Racing Team, the departure of Jason Bright left a vacancy at the Holden Racing Team in 2003. Kelly and new team-mate Mark Skaife won the Sandown 500 in very wet conditions and in controversial circumstances with a late race tussle with the Team Dynamik Commodore of Jason Richards and Simon Wills. Kelly finished ninth in the championship, behind his brother Rick in eighth. Kelly was part of the two-car Holden Monaro assault by Garry Rogers Motorsport on the 2003 Bathurst 24 Hour race. With co-drivers Jason Bright, Greg Murphy and Peter Brock, Kelly won the race with Murphy crossing the line only 0.3505 seconds ahead of the teams lead car (and the 2002 race winner) driven by Garth Tander and co-driven by Steven Richards, Cameron McConville and Nathan Pretty.

Season 2004 saw Kelly finish behind his brother in the Championship, but this time two places up in seventh. Season 2005 was Kelly's most successful year in V8 Supercars, claiming five podiums. Three of them were wins, including the Bathurst 1000 with Mark Skaife which was Todd's 26th birthday and also the V8 Supercars China Round, the series' only ever event to be held in China. He finished fourth in the standings, ahead of teammate Skaife in fifth.

Kelly's 2006 season was fairly average throughout the first six rounds, albeit largely through mechanical failures, however after strong driving performances at the next three rounds including second in both the Sandown 500 and Bathurst 1000 when he paired up with younger brother Rick Kelly. Kelly's seat was taken by HSV Dealer Team driver Garth Tander. He was just starting to show some of the form that had him finish fourth in the championship in 2005. He finished the year off strongly, with a second and first place in the last two rounds which left him in sixth place at the end of the year.

Season 2007 was another average year for Kelly, he won the Clipsal 500 but was not able to continue that edge. He came second at Phillip Island and at the Grand Finale, finishing seventh in the championship. In doing so, helped secure Garth Tander the driver's championship. At the conclusion of the season, Kelly announced he would drive for Jack Daniel's Racing from 2008 onwards after a five-year association with HRT. This move is believed to have also been supported by 2007 champion Garth Tander confirming he will be moving from HSVDT to HRT.

Kelly's 2008 proved to be inconsistent. After starting the year well at Clipsal, where he finished fifth for the round, the middle part of the season saw a lack of the results expected from Kelly. After a major suspension geometry issue was resolved during the course of the Bathurst weekend, the car showed a sudden turn of speed. He finished 4th at Surfers Paradise, then scored a stunning race win in the wet at Symmons Plains, the first victory of any kind (race or round) for a Perkins Engineering entry since 2006. Kelly finished the season in 12th position.

== Career results ==
Season	Series	Position	Car	Team
1996	Australian Formula Ford Championship	12th	Van Diemen RF93 Ford	Todd Kelly
1997	Australian Formula Ford Championship	**3rd**	Van Diemen RF95 Ford	Todd Kelly
1998	Australian Drivers' Championship	**2nd**	Reynard 92D Holden	Todd Kelly
1999	Shell Championship Series	36th	Holden Commodore (VS); Holden Commodore (VT)	Holden Young Lions
1999	Australian Drivers' Championship	8th	Reynard 92D Holden	Greg Murphy Racing
2000	Shell Championship Series	17th	Holden Commodore (VT)	Holden Racing Team
2001	Shell Championship Series	6th	Holden Commodore (VX)	K-mart Racing
2002	V8 Supercar Championship Series	5th	Holden Commodore (VX)	K-mart Racing
2003	V8 Supercar Championship Series	9th	Holden Commodore (VY)	Holden Racing Team
2004	V8 Supercar Championship Series	7th	Holden Commodore (VY)	Holden Racing Team
2005	V8 Supercar Championship Series	4th	Holden Commodore (VZ)	Holden Racing Team
2006	V8 Supercar Championship Series	6th	Holden Commodore (VZ)	Holden Racing Team; HSV Dealer Team
2007	V8 Supercar Championship Series	6th	Holden Commodore (VE)	Holden Racing Team
2008	V8 Supercar Championship Series	12th	Holden Commodore (VE)	Jack Daniel's Racing
2009	V8 Supercar Championship Series	18th	Holden Commodore (VE)	Kelly Racing
2010	V8 Supercar Championship Series	18th	Holden Commodore (VE)	Kelly Racing
2011	International V8 Supercars Championship	18th	Holden Commodore (VE)	Kelly Racing
2012	International V8 Supercars Championship	22nd	Holden Commodore (VE)	Kelly Racing
2013	International V8 Supercars Championship	25th	Nissan Altima L33	Nissan Motorsport
2014	International V8 Supercars Championship	22nd	Nissan Altima L33	Nissan Motorsport
2015	International V8 Supercars Championship	17th	Nissan Altima L33	Nissan Motorsport
2016	International V8 Supercars Championship	14th	Nissan Altima L33	Nissan Motorsport
2017	Virgin Australia Supercars Championship	18th	Nissan Altima L33	Nissan Motorsport

=== Supercars Championship results ===
(Races in bold indicate pole position) (Races in italics indicate fastest lap)

Supercars results
Year	Team	No.	Car	1	2	3	4	5	6	7	8	9	10	11	12	13	14	15	16	17	18	19	20	21	22	23	24	25	26	27	28	29	30	31	32	33	34	35	36	37	38	39	Position	Points
1999	Holden Young Lions	15	Holden VS Commodore	EAS; R1; Ret	EAS; R2; DNS	EAS; R3; DNS	ADE; R4	BAR; R5	BAR; R6	BAR; R7	PHI; R8	PHI; R9	PHI; R10	HDV; R11	HDV; R12	HDV; R13	SAN; R14; 23	SAN; R15; 24	SAN; R16; 22	QLD; R17; 14	QLD; R18; 15	QLD; R19; 14	CAL; R20	CAL; R21	CAL; R22	SYM; R23	SYM; R24	SYM; R25	WIN; R26	WIN; R27	WIN; R28	ORA; R29	ORA; R30	ORA; R31	QLD; R32; Ret								36th	304
1999	Holden Young Lions	15	Holden VT Commodore																																	BAT; R33; 6							36th	304
2000	Holden Young Lions	15	Holden VT Commodore	PHI; R1; 15	PHI; R2; 9	BAR; R3	BAR; R4	BAR; R5	ADE; R6; 11	ADE; R7; Ret	EAS; R8; 22	EAS; R9; 18	EAS; R10; 16	HDV; R11	HDV; R12	HDV; R13	CAN; R14; 19	CAN; R15; 1	CAN; R16; 4	QLD; R17	QLD; R18	QLD; R19	WIN; R20; 10	WIN; R21; 8	WIN; R22; Ret	ORA; R23; 8	ORA; R24; 13	ORA; R25; 13	CAL; R26; 29	CAL; R27; 18	CAL; R28; 13	QLD; R29; Ret	SAN; R30	SAN; R31	SAN; R32	BAT; R33; 5							17th	575
2001	K-Mart Racing Team	15	Holden VX Commodore	PHI; R1; 8	PHI; R2; 7	ADE; R3; 15	ADE; R4; 5	EAS; R5; 16	EAS; R6; 8	HDV; R7; 18	HDV; R8; 8	HDV; R9; 20	CAN; R10; Ret	CAN; R11; 18	CAN; R12; 16	BAR; R13; 7	BAR; R14; 7	BAR; R15; 6	CAL; R16; 29	CAL; R17; Ret	CAL; R18; 21	ORA; R19; 4	ORA; R20; 8	QLD; R21; 3	WIN; R22; 11	WIN; R23; 25	BAT; R24; 3	PUK; R25; 8	PUK; R26; 18	PUK; R27; 5	SAN; R28; 3	SAN; R29; 1	**SAN**; **R30**; **3**										6th	2479
2002	K-Mart Racing Team	15	Holden VX Commodore	ADE; R1; 9	ADE; R2; 12	PHI; R3; 3	PHI; R4; 2	EAS; R5; 11	EAS; R6; 5	EAS; R7; 6	HDV; R8; 5	HDV; R9; 3	HDV; R10; 6	CAN; R11; 3	CAN; R12; 10	CAN; R13; 2	BAR; R14; 4	BAR; R15; Ret	BAR; R16; 5	ORA; R17; Ret	ORA; R18; Ret	WIN; R19; 3	WIN; R20; 2	QLD; R21; 10	BAT; R22; 13	SUR; R23; 7	SUR; R24; 3	PUK; R25; 5	PUK; R26; 4	PUK; R27; 1	SAN; R28; 4	SAN; R29; Ret											5th	1345
2003	Holden Racing Team	2	Holden VY Commodore	ADE; R1; 5	ADE; R1; 5	PHI; R3; 5	EAS; R4; Ret	WIN; R5; DSQ	BAR; R6; 7	BAR; R7; 7	BAR; R8; 2	HDV; R9; 7	HDV; R10; 24	HDV; R11; Ret	QLD; R12; 3	ORA; R13; 6	SAN; R14; 1	BAT; R15; 8	**SUR**; **R16**; **10**	SUR; R17; Ret	PUK; R18; 2	PUK; R19; 4	PUK; R20; 4	EAS; R21; 3	EAS; R22; Ret																		9th	1628
2004	Holden Racing Team	22	Holden VY Commodore	ADE; R1; Ret	ADE; R2; 10	EAS; R3; 19	PUK; R4; 17	PUK; R5; 10	PUK; R6; 14	HDV; R7; 2	HDV; R8; 2	HDV; R9; 1	BAR; R10; 11	BAR; R11; 8	BAR; R12; 10	QLD; R13; 9	WIN; R14; 7	ORA; R15; 5	ORA; R16; 7	SAN; R17; 23	BAT; R18; 14	SUR; R19; 3	SUR; R20; DSQ	SYM; R21; 3	SYM; R22; 3	SYM; R23; Ret	EAS; R24; 27	EAS; R25; 12	EAS; R26; 5														7th	1623
2005	Holden Racing Team	22	Holden VZ Commodore	ADE; R1; 8	ADE; R2; 4	PUK; R3; 8	PUK; R4; Ret	PUK; R5; 9	BAR; R6; Ret	BAR; R7; 23	BAR; R8; 7	EAS; R9; 6	EAS; R10; 4	SHA; R11; 1	**SHA**; **R12**; **3**	SHA; R13; 1	HDV; R14; 1	**HDV**; **R15**; **1**	**HDV**; **R16**; **2**	QLD; R17; 6	ORA; R18; Ret	ORA; R19; 22	SAN; R20; 2	BAT; R21; 1	SUR; R22; Ret	SUR; R23; 14	SUR; R24; 8	SYM; R25; 15	SYM; R26; 11	SYM; R27; 7	PHI; R28; 13	PHI; R29; 16	PHI; R30; 6										4th	1760
2006	Holden Racing Team	22	Holden VZ Commodore	ADE; R1; 6	ADE; R2; 2	PUK; R3; Ret	PUK; R4; 13	PUK; R5; 25	BAR; R6; 30	BAR; R7; 28	BAR; R8; 4	WIN; R9; 4	WIN; R10; 25	WIN; R11; 24	HDV; R12; 12	HDV; R13; 27	HDV; R14; 22	QLD; R15; Ret	QLD; R16; 21	QLD; R17; 18	ORA; R18; 1	ORA; R19; 10	ORA; R20; Ret	SAN; R21; 2	BAT; R22; 2	**SUR**; **R23**; 1	**SUR**; **R24**; 2	SUR; R25; 2	SYM; R26; 7	SYM; R27; 4	SYM; R28; 5	BHR; R29; 3	BHR; R30; 4	BHR; R31; 1	**PHI**; **R32**; 1	**PHI**; **R33**; 1	**PHI**; **R34**; 5						6th	2815
2007	Holden Racing Team	22	Holden VE Commodore	ADE; R1; 1	**ADE**; **R2**; **2**	BAR; R3; Ret	BAR; R4; 10	BAR; R5; 7	PUK; R6; 6	PUK; R7; 4	PUK; R8; 2	**WIN**; **R9**; **27**	WIN; R10; 11	WIN; R11; 4	**EAS**; **R12**; **4**	EAS; R13; 5	EAS; R14; 1	HDV; R15; 4	HDV; R16; 8	HDV; R17; 4	QLD; R18; 8	QLD; R19; 11	QLD; R20; 19	**ORA**; **R21**; **8**	ORA; R22; 2	ORA; R23; 11	SAN; R24; 9	BAT; R25; Ret	SUR; R26; Ret	SUR; R27; 26	SUR; R28; Ret	BHR; R29; 11	BHR; R30; 28	BHR; R31; Ret	SYM; R32; 12	SYM; R33; 20	SYM; R34; Ret	PHI; R35; 6	PHI; R36; 2	PHI; R37; 1			6th	381
2008	Perkins Engineering	7	Holden VE Commodore	ADE; R1; 15	ADE; R2; 4	EAS; R3; 13	EAS; R4; 13	EAS; R5; 15	HAM; R6; 8	HAM; R7; 19	HAM; R8; 15	BAR; R9; 9	BAR; R10; Ret	BAR; R11; 8	SAN; R12; 17	SAN; R13; 8	SAN; R14; 5	HDV; R15; 11	HDV; R16; 29	HDV; R17; 11	QLD; R18; 19	QLD; R19; 13	QLD; R20; 12	WIN; R21; 6	WIN; R22; 13	WIN; R23; 11	PHI; Q 19	PHI; R24; 13	BAT; R25; 17	SUR; R26; 4	SUR; R27; 7	SUR; R28; 6	BHR; R29; 20	BHR; R30; 6	BHR; R31; Ret	SYM; R32; 1	**SYM**; **R33**; 3	SYM; R34; 3	ORA; R35; 7	ORA; R36; 8	ORA; R37; Ret		12th	2053
2009	Kelly Racing	7	Holden VE Commodore	ADE; R1; 7	ADE; R2; Ret	HAM; R3; 8	HAM; R4; 24	WIN; R5; Ret	WIN; R6; 24	SYM; R7; 5	SYM; R8; Ret	HDV; R9; 5	HDV; R10; 28	TOW; R11; 10	TOW; R12; Ret	SAN; R13; 4	SAN; R14; 18	QLD; R15; 6	QLD; R16; 18	PHI; R17; 5	BAT; R18; 8	SUR; R19; 19	SUR; R20; 23	SUR; R21; 18	SUR; R22; 15	PHI; R23; 29	PHI; R24; 21	BAR; R25; 2	BAR; R26; Ret	SYD; R27; 14	SYD; R28; Ret												18th	1624
2010	Kelly Racing	7	Holden VE Commodore	YMC; R1; 25	YMC; R2; 26	BHR; R3; 20	BHR; R4; Ret	ADE; R5; 13	ADE; R6; 12	HAM; R7; 20	HAM; R8; 8	QLD; R9; 29	QLD; R10; 14	WIN; R11; 6	WIN; R12; 22	HDV; R13; 9	HDV; R14; 8	TOW; R15; 17	TOW; R16; 19	PHI; R17; 18	BAT; R18; 20	SUR; R19; 20	SUR; R20; Ret	SYM; R21; 15	SYM; R22; 7	SAN; R23; 11	SAN; R24; 19	SYD; R25; Ret	SYD; R26; 21														18th	1435
2011	Kelly Racing	7	Holden VE Commodore	YMC; R1; 10	YMC; R2; Ret	ADE; R3; 7	ADE; R4; Ret	HAM; R5; 3	HAM; R6; 15	BAR; R7; 27	BAR; R8; 22	BAR; R9; 16	WIN; R10; 21	WIN; R11; Ret	HID; R12; 16	HID; R13; Ret	TOW; R14; 14	TOW; R15; 17	QLD; R16; 17	QLD; R17; Ret	QLD; R18; 15	PHI; R19; 14	BAT; R20; 24	SUR; R21; 13	SUR; R22; 9	SYM; R23; 11	SYM; R24; 8	SAN; R25; 3	SAN; R26; 20	SYD; R27; 9	SYD; R28; 16												18th	1550
2012	Kelly Racing	7	Holden VE Commodore	ADE; R1; 8	ADE; R2; 23	SYM; R3; 10	SYM; R4; 10	HAM; R5; 14	HAM; R6; 9	BAR; R7; 21	BAR; R8; 22	BAR; R9; 23	PHI; R10; 12	PHI; R11; 11	HID; R12; 11	HID; R13; 14	TOW; R14; 15	TOW; R15; 21	QLD; R16; 13	QLD; R17; 16	SMP; R18; 14	SMP; R19; 23	SAN; QR; 17	SAN; R20; 18	BAT; R21; 18	SUR; R22	SUR; R23	YMC; R24	YMC; R25	YMC; R26	WIN; R27	WIN; R28	SYD; R29	SYD; R30									22nd	1263
2013	Kelly Racing	7	Nissan Altima L33	ADE; R1; Ret	ADE; R2; Ret	SYM; R3; Ret	SYM; R4; 16	SYM; R5; Ret	PUK; R6; 17	PUK; R7; 18	PUK; R8; 15	PUK; R9; 14	BAR; R10; 20	BAR; R11; 17	BAR; R12; 21	COA; R13; 25	COA; R14; 16	COA; R15; 14	COA; R16; 19	HID; R17; 17	HID; R18; 12	HID; R19; 20	TOW; R20; 16	TOW; R21; 15	QLD; R22; 15	QLD; R23; 22	QLD; R24; 10	WIN; R25; 24	WIN; R26; 14	WIN; R27; Ret	SAN; R28; 11	BAT; R29; Ret	SUR; R30; 17	SUR; R31; Ret	PHI; R32; 16	PHI; R33; 16	PHI; R34; 13	SYD; R35; 10	SYD; R36; 17				25th	1139
2014	Kelly Racing	7	Nissan Altima L33	ADE; R1; 16	ADE; R2; 9	ADE; R3; Ret	SYM; R4; Ret	SYM; R5; 13	SYM; R6; 21	WIN; R7; 17	WIN; R8; 23	WIN; R9; 13	PUK; R10; 16	PUK; R11; 13	PUK; R12; 19	PUK; R13; 24	BAR; R14; 8	BAR; R15; 16	BAR; R16; 16	HID; R17; 20	HID; R18; 23	HID; R19; Ret	TOW; R20; 18	TOW; R21; 20	TOW; R22; 19	QLD; R23; 24	QLD; R24; 16	QLD; R25; 21	SMP; R26; Ret	SMP; R27; 17	SMP; R28; 15	SAN; QR; 11	SAN; R29; 20	BAT; R30; 7	SUR; R31; Ret	SUR; R32; 19	PHI; R33; 8	PHI; R34; 5	PHI; R35; 14	SYD; R36; Ret	SYD; R37; 23	SYD; R38; 14	22nd	1323
2015	Kelly Racing	7	Nissan Altima L33	ADE; R1; 14	ADE; R2; 12	ADE; R3; 10	SYM; R4; 23	SYM; R5; 13	SYM; R6; 13	BAR; R7; 12	BAR; R8; 12	BAR; R9; 13	WIN; R10; 5	WIN; R11; 13	WIN; R12; 12	HID; R13; 10	HID; R14; 12	HID; R15; 17	TOW; R16; 17	TOW; R17; 10	QLD; R18; 19	QLD; R19; 6	QLD; R20; Ret	SMP; R21; 17	SMP; R22; 25	SMP; R23; 24	SAN; QR; 22	SAN; R24; 24	BAT; R25; 20	SUR; R26; 13	SUR; R27; 17	PUK; R28; 12	PUK; R29; 17	PUK; R30; 13	PHI; R31; 11	PHI; R32; 19	PHI; R33; 5	SYD; R34; 11	SYD; R35; 16	SYD; R36; 13			17th	1664
2016	Kelly Racing	7	Nissan Altima L33	ADE; R1; 6	ADE; R2; 16	ADE; R3; 6	SYM; R4; 19	SYM; R5; 12	PHI; R6; 11	PHI; R7; 12	BAR; R8; 7	BAR; R9; 23	WIN; R10; 13	WIN; R11; 13	HID; R12; 7	HID; R13; 13	TOW; R14; 10	TOW; R15; 23	QLD; R16; 12	QLD; R17; 9	SMP; R18; 24	SMP; R19; 9	SAN; QR; 18	SAN; R20; 7	BAT; R21; Ret	SUR; R22; 8	SUR; R23; 21	PUK; R24; 19	PUK; R25; 16	PUK; R26; 15	PUK; R27; 11	SYD; R28; 12	SYD; R29; 19										14th	1808
2017	Kelly Racing	7	Nissan Altima L33	ADE; R1; 22	ADE; R2; 9	SYM; R3; 9	SYM; R4; 18	PHI; R5; 6	PHI; R6; 11	BAR; R7; 11	BAR; R8; 18	WIN; R9; 12	WIN; R10; 17	HID; R11; 18	HID; R12; 20	TOW; R13; Ret	TOW; R14; 17	QLD; R15; 18	QLD; R16; 12	SMP; R17; 25	SMP; R18; 10	SAN; R19; 16	BAT; R20; 7	SUR; R21; Ret	SUR; R22; 12	PUK; R23; 15	PUK; R24; 18	NEW; R25; 15	NEW; R26; 10														18th	1536

== Bathurst 1000 results ==
Year	Team	Car	Co-driver	Position	Laps
1998	John Faulkner Racing	Holden Commodore (VS)	(New Zealand) John Faulkner	DNF	136
1999	Holden Young Lions	Holden Commodore (VT)	(Australia) Mark Noske	6th	161
2000	Holden Young Lions	Holden Commodore VT	(Australia) Nathan Pretty	5th	161
2001	Kmart Racing	Holden Commodore (VX)	(New Zealand) Greg Murphy	3rd	161
2002	Kmart Racing	Holden Commodore VX	(New Zealand) Greg Murphy	13th	159
2003	Holden Racing Team	Holden Commodore (VY)	(Australia) Mark Skaife	8th	161
2004	Holden Racing Team	Holden Commodore VY	(Australia) Mark Skaife	14th	159
2005	Holden Racing Team	Holden Commodore (VZ)	(Australia) Mark Skaife	1st	161
2006	HSV Dealer Team	Holden Commodore VZ	(Australia) Rick Kelly	2nd	161
2007	Holden Racing Team	Holden Commodore (VE)	(Australia) Mark Skaife	DNF	149
2008	Perkins Engineering	Holden Commodore VE	(Australia) Shane Price	17th	157
2009	Kelly Racing	Holden Commodore VE	(Australia) Rick Kelly	8th	161
2010	Kelly Racing	Holden Commodore VE	(Australia) Dale Wood	20th	161
2011	Kelly Racing	Holden Commodore VE	(Australia) David Russell	24th	154
2012	Kelly Racing	Holden Commodore VE	(Australia) Tim Blanchard	18th	154
2013	Nissan Motorsport	Nissan Altima L33	(Australia) David Russell	DNF	20
2014	Nissan Motorsport	Nissan Altima L33	(United Kingdom) Alex Buncombe	7th	161
2015	Nissan Motorsport	Nissan Altima L33	(United Kingdom) Alex Buncombe	20th	156
2016	Nissan Motorsport	Nissan Altima L33	(Australia) Matthew Campbell	DNF	157
2017	Nissan Motorsport	Nissan Altima L33	(Australia) Jack Le Brocq	7th	161

== Bathurst 24 Hour results ==
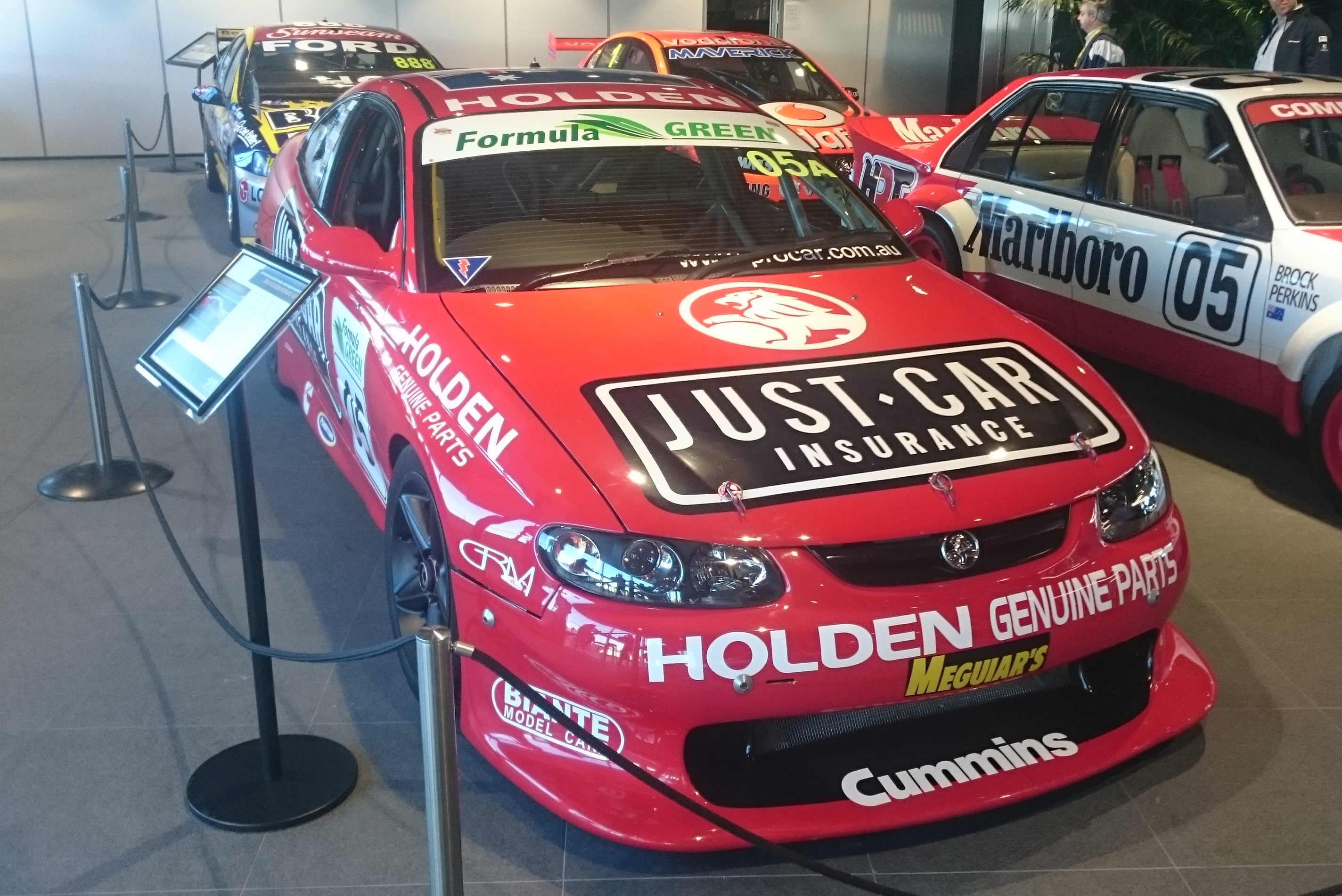
The 2003 Bathurst 24 Hour winning Holden Monaro

Year	Team	Co-drivers	Car	Class	Laps	Overall position	Class position
2003	(Australia) Garry Rogers Motorsport	(Australia) Peter Brock (New Zealand) Greg Murphy (Australia) Jason Bright	Holden Monaro 427C	A	527	1st	1st

Sporting positions
Preceded by Greg Murphy; Rick Kelly	Winner of the Bathurst 1000; 2005 (with Mark Skaife)	Succeeded by Craig Lowndes; Jamie Whincup
