= 2001 V8 Supercars Perth round =

Motor race in Perth, Western Australia

(Western Australia) 2001 Barbagallo V8 Supercar round
Event Information
- Round 6 of 13 in the 2001 Shell Championship Series
- Date: 22–24 June 2001
- Location: Perth, Western Australia
- Venue: Barbagallo Raceway
- Weather: Fine

Results
Race 1
Distance	20 laps	50 km
Pole position	Paul Radisich; Dick Johnson Racing	57.2542
Winner	Paul Radisich; Dick Johnson Racing	19:54.3879
Race 2
Distance	20 laps	50 km
Winner	Paul Radisich; Dick Johnson Racing	19:56.1629
Race 3
Distance	20 laps	50 km
Winner	Paul Radisich; Dick Johnson Racing	20:10.6998
Round Results
First	Paul Radisich; Dick Johnson Racing	288 pts
Second	Mark Skaife; Holden Racing Team	252 pts
Third	Greg Murphy; Tom Walkinshaw Racing Australia	209 pts

The 2001 V8 Supercars Perth round was the sixth round of the 2001 Shell Championship Series. It was held on the weekend of 22 to 24 June at Barbagallo Raceway in Perth, Western Australia.

The weekend was dominated by Paul Radisich of Dick Johnson Racing. It was one of few rounds in the year where a single driver claimed pole position and won all races throughout the weekend. The Holden Racing Team entry of Mark Skaife provided a challenge to Radisich toward the end of the weekend and his strong overall points tally helped extend his lead in the championship standings.

== Background ==
The event was held on the weekend of 22 to 24 June 2001. It was the 25th ATCC/V8 Supercar event to be held at Barbagallo Raceway, and consisted of three 50 km races. Unlike most events throughout the season, there were no compulsory pitstops in any of the races as the sprint format of the weekend meant races barely lasted for over 20 minutes.

Mark Skaife entered the round as the championship leader by 14 points over Holden Racing Team teammate, Jason Bright. Steven Johnson had moved up to third following his round victory in Canberra, and the form shown from Dick Johnson Racing was a topic of discussion heading into the Perth round.

Heading into the weekend, Craig Lowndes had held a remarkable record of winning every single V8 Supercar race he had ever contested at Barbagallo Raceway.

=== Entry list ===
There were 32 entrants into round six of the championship with only three changes from the Canberra 400 entry list.

Tony Ricciardello would make his season debut for Imrie Motorsport at this round in a one-off performance. Daniel Miller would also make his sole appearance for the season in a privateer outfit, and Trevor Ashby would make his final solo appearance in the category in this round.

== Race results ==
=== Qualifying ===
Russell Ingall claimed provisional pole position with a lap over a tenth faster than Craig Lowndes. Paul Morris proved a surprise contender, qualifying in fifth place and ahead of championship leader, Mark Skaife. Marcos Ambrose reportedly suffered a misfire throughout the session which hampered his run and resigned him to start 18th for the first race.

Pos	No	Name	Team	Vehicle	Time
1	8	(Australia) Russell Ingall	Perkins Engineering	Holden Commodore (VX)	0:57.5199
2	00	(Australia) Craig Lowndes	Gibson Motorsport	Ford Falcon (AU)	0:57.6501
3	18	(New Zealand) Paul Radisich	Dick Johnson Racing	Ford Falcon (AU)	0:57.6540
4	5	(Australia) Glenn Seton	Glenn Seton Racing	Ford Falcon (AU)	0:57.6865
5	29	(Australia) Paul Morris	Paul Morris Motorsport	Holden Commodore (VX)	0:57.6949
6	1	(Australia) Mark Skaife	Holden Racing Team	Holden Commodore (VX)	0:57.7511
7	2	(Australia) Jason Bright	Holden Racing Team	Holden Commodore (VX)	0:57.8041
8	15	(Australia) Todd Kelly	Tom Walkinshaw Racing Australia	Holden Commodore (VX)	0:57.8250
9	51	(New Zealand) Greg Murphy	Tom Walkinshaw Racing Australia	Holden Commodore (VX)	0:57.8490
10	11	(Australia) Larry Perkins	Perkins Engineering	Holden Commodore (VX)	0:57.8711
11	3	(Australia) Cameron McConville	Lansvale Racing Team	Holden Commodore (VX)	0:57.8908
12	35	(Australia) Jason Bargwanna	Garry Rogers Motorsport	Holden Commodore (VX)	0:57.9347
13	34	(Australia) Garth Tander	Garry Rogers Motorsport	Holden Commodore (VX)	0:57.9686
14	17	(Australia) Steven Johnson	Dick Johnson Racing	Ford Falcon (AU)	0:57.9711
15	600	(Australia) John Bowe	Briggs Motor Sport	Ford Falcon (AU)	0:57.9811
16	43	(Australia) Paul Weel	Paul Weel Racing	Ford Falcon (AU)	0:58.0102
17	10	(Australia) Mark Larkham	Larkham Motor Sport	Ford Falcon (AU)	0:58.1150
18	4	(Australia) Marcos Ambrose	Stone Brothers Racing	Ford Falcon (AU)	0:58.1624
19	6	(New Zealand) Steven Richards	Glenn Seton Racing	Ford Falcon (AU)	0:58.1833
20	31	(Australia) Steven Ellery	Steven Ellery Racing	Ford Falcon (AU)	0:58.3656
21	9	(Australia) David Besnard	Stone Brothers Racing	Ford Falcon (AU)	0:58.3729
22	021	(New Zealand) Jason Richards	Team Kiwi Racing	Holden Commodore (VT)	0:58.5317
23	46	(New Zealand) John Faulkner	John Faulkner Racing	Holden Commodore (VT)	0:58.5815
24	54	(Australia) Tony Longhurst	Rod Nash Racing	Holden Commodore (VX)	0:58.7332
25	75	(Australia) Anthony Tratt	Paul Little Racing	Ford Falcon (AU)	0:58.8153
26	21	(Australia) Brad Jones	Brad Jones Racing	Ford Falcon (AU)	0:58.9301
27	23	(Australia) Trevor Ashby	Lansvale Racing Team	Holden Commodore (VS)	0:58.9666
28	24	(Australia) Paul Romano	Romano Racing	Holden Commodore (VX)	0:58.9841
29	7	(Australia) Rodney Forbes	Gibson Motorsport	Ford Falcon (AU)	0:59.0393
30	40	(Australia) Cameron McLean	Paragon Motorsport	Ford Falcon (AU)	0:59.1690
31	14	(Australia) Tony Ricciardello	Imrie Motorsport	Holden Commodore (VX)	0:59.8969
32	84	(Australia) Daniel Miller	Miller Racing	Holden Commodore (VS)	0:59.9580

=== Top Ten Shootout ===
Radisich obliterated the field in the top ten shootout by setting a time nearly three tenths faster than nearest competitor, Glenn Seton. He had also lapped noticeably faster than he did in provisional qualifying and thus scored Dick Johnson Racing's second consecutive pole position of the season.

Pos	No	Name	Team	Vehicle	Time	Points
1	18	(New Zealand) Paul Radisich	Dick Johnson Racing	Ford Falcon (AU)	57.2542	18
2	5	(Australia) Glenn Seton	Glenn Seton Racing	Ford Falcon (AU)	57.5203	16
3	29	(Australia) Paul Morris	Paul Morris Motorsport	Holden Commodore (VX)	57.6397	14
4	8	(Australia) Russell Ingall	Perkins Engineering	Holden Commodore (VX)	57.6640	13
5	1	(Australia) Mark Skaife	Holden Racing Team	Holden Commodore (VX)	57.6773	12
6	11	(Australia) Larry Perkins	Perkins Engineering	Holden Commodore (VX)	57.8773	11
7	00	(Australia) Craig Lowndes	Gibson Motorsport	Ford Falcon (AU)	57.9028	10
8	51	(New Zealand) Greg Murphy	Tom Walkinshaw Racing Australia	Holden Commodore (VX)	58.0712	9
9	15	(Australia) Todd Kelly	Tom Walkinshaw Racing Australia	Holden Commodore (VX)	58.1340	8
10	2	(Australia) Jason Bright	Holden Racing Team	Holden Commodore (VX)	58.1745	7

=== Race 1 ===
Paul Romano immediately retired from the first race after his gearbox failed on the formation lap.

Radisich led away from the start with Morris getting the jump on Seton to move up into second place. Despite pressuring Radisich for the lead on the opening lap, Morris eventually began to lose ground and fell into the clutches of Ingall in third place. Anthony Tratt sustained damage on the opening lap that saw his front-left door open on the racetrack. For this, he was issued a mechanical black flag.

Morris began struggling with rear tyres and started to defend from Ingall, with the latter eventually passing him on lap seven. Skaife moved past Seton for fourth and began to pressure Morris for third. Morris continued to fall through the pack, eventually finishing in eighth. Larry Perkins retired from the race on lap 14 after his throttle jammed heading into turn one, his car coming to rest in the gravel trap at turn one. Morris would receive a bad sportsmanship flag for excessive blocking. Skaife began to gradually reel in Ingall, eventually passing him for second place on lap 16.

Radisich cruised home unopposed to take victory by nearly 13 seconds over Skaife and Ingall. This also ended Craig Lowndes' unbeaten streak at this circuit in V8 Supercars.

Pos	No	Driver	Team	Car	Laps	Time	Grid	Points
1	18	(New Zealand) Paul Radisich	Dick Johnson Racing	Ford Falcon (AU)	20	19min 54.3879sec	1	90
2	1	(Australia) Mark Skaife	Holden Racing Team	Holden Commodore (VX)	20	+ 12.72	5	80
3	8	(Australia) Russell Ingall	Perkins Engineering	Holden Commodore (VX)	20	+ 13.52	4	72
4	5	(Australia) Glenn Seton	Glenn Seton Racing	Ford Falcon (AU)	20	+ 18.59	2	66
5	51	(New Zealand) Greg Murphy	Tom Walkinshaw Racing Australia	Holden Commodore (VX)	20	+ 19.83	8	62
6	00	(Australia) Craig Lowndes	Gibson Motorsport	Ford Falcon (AU)	20	+ 21.37	7	58
7	15	(Australia) Todd Kelly	Tom Walkinshaw Racing Australia	Holden Commodore (VX)	20	+ 23.25	9	54
8	29	(Australia) Paul Morris	Paul Morris Motorsport	Holden Commodore (VX)	20	+ 27.54	3	50
9	17	(Australia) Steven Johnson	Dick Johnson Racing	Ford Falcon (AU)	20	+ 27.73	14	48
10	2	(Australia) Jason Bright	Holden Racing Team	Holden Commodore (VX)	20	+ 28.06	10	46
11	35	(Australia) Jason Bargwanna	Garry Rogers Motorsport	Holden Commodore (VX)	20	+ 29.07	12	44
12	3	(Australia) Cameron McConville	Lansvale Racing Team	Holden Commodore (VX)	20	+ 29.30	11	42
13	600	(Australia) John Bowe	Briggs Motorsport	Ford Falcon (AU)	20	+ 30.05	15	40
14	6	(New Zealand) Steven Richards	Glenn Seton Racing	Ford Falcon (AU)	20	+ 32.55	19	38
15	31	(Australia) Steven Ellery	Steven Ellery Racing	Ford Falcon (AU)	20	+ 34.08	20	36
16	43	(Australia) Paul Weel	Paul Weel Racing	Ford Falcon (AU)	20	+ 37.35	16	34
17	54	(Australia) Tony Longhurst	Rod Nash Racing	Holden Commodore (VX)	20	+ 37.59	24	32
18	4	(Australia) Marcos Ambrose	Stone Brothers Racing	Ford Falcon (AU)	20	+ 38.31	18	30
19	40	(Australia) Cameron McLean	Paragon Motorsport	Ford Falcon (AU)	20	+ 40.95	30	28
20	9	(Australia) David Besnard	Stone Brothers Racing	Ford Falcon (AU)	20	+ 42.93	21	26
21	10	(Australia) Mark Larkham	Larkham Motorsport	Ford Falcon (AU)	20	+ 43.28	17	24
22	21	(Australia) Brad Jones	Brad Jones Racing	Ford Falcon (AU)	20	+ 44.31	26	22
23	34	(Australia) Garth Tander	Garry Rogers Motorsport	Holden Commodore (VX)	20	+ 44.59	13	20
24	7	(Australia) Rodney Forbes	Gibson Motorsport	Ford Falcon (AU)	20	+ 44.76	29	18
25	23	(Australia) Steve Reed	Lansvale Racing Team	Holden Commodore (VS)	20	+ 45.88	27	16
26	84	(Australia) Daniel Miller	Miller Racing	Holden Commodore (VS)	20	+ 49.44	32	14
27	46	(New Zealand) John Faulkner	John Faulkner Racing	Holden Commodore (VT)	20	+ 53.56	23	12
28	021	(New Zealand) Jason Richards	Team Kiwi Racing	Holden Commodore (VT)	20	+ 54.49	22	10
29	14	(Australia) Tony Ricciardello	Imrie Motor Sport	Holden Commodore (VX)	19	+ 1 lap	31	8
30	75	(Australia) Anthony Tratt	Paul Little Racing	Ford Falcon (AU)	19	+ 1 lap	25	6
Ret	11	(Australia) Larry Perkins	Perkins Engineering	Holden Commodore (VX)	13	Spun off	6	
Ret	24	(Australia) Paul Romano	Romano Racing	Holden Commodore (VX)	0	Gearbox	28	
Fastest Lap: Paul Radisich (Dick Johnson Racing) - 0:58.5664 on lap 2

=== Race 2 ===
The grey skies that loomed overhead on Saturday dissipated by Sunday morning. Chaos and confusion ensued at the start when the starting lights failed mid-sequence, leading to the marshals to utilise the green flag to start the race. Lowndes was alert to this and made the best start of any driver in the top ten. In his efforts to surge toward the front, he made side-to-side contact with Seton which partially dislodged the front spoiler on his Falcon. Radisich led past turn one from Skaife, Ingall, Lowndes and Greg Murphy. The damage inhibited Seton's pace and he rapidly fell through the pack.

Skaife immediately began to apply pressure to Radisich for the lead. But like in race one, Radisich began to eek out a lead with his superior race pace and tyre management, and Skaife would instead find himself under pressure from Ingall for second. Jason Bargwanna's race came to an end on lap four after spearing off into the gravel trap at the bottom end of the circuit after coming into contact with Morris. Seton peeled off into the pitlane on lap eight to replace the damaged spoiler and tyres. David Besnard suffered a self-induced spin on the outside of turn four. The early pace exhibited by Lowndes did not sustain, and Johnson, despite suffering badly from the flu, would eventually pass him for fifth place before the end of the race. Morris fell to the very back of the order after having started in the top ten. The lack of pace would later be attributed to a misfire.

Ingall continued to eat into the margin between he and Skaife. With two laps remaining, the gap had whittled down to under a second. The pace difference wasn't great enough for the Perkins Engineering pilot to pass the championship leader before the end. Radisich once again dominated proceedings to win with Skaife and Ingall rounding out the podium.

Pos	No	Driver	Team	Car	Laps	Time	Grid	Points
1	18	(New Zealand) Paul Radisich	Dick Johnson Racing	Ford Falcon (AU)	20	19min 54.3879sec	1	90
2	1	(Australia) Mark Skaife	Holden Racing Team	Holden Commodore (VX)	20	+ 2.35	2	80
3	8	(Australia) Russell Ingall	Perkins Engineering	Holden Commodore (VX)	20	+ 3.04	3	72
4	51	(New Zealand) Greg Murphy	Tom Walkinshaw Racing Australia	Holden Commodore (VX)	20	+ 13.00	5	66
5	17	(Australia) Steven Johnson	Dick Johnson Racing	Ford Falcon (AU)	20	+ 13.56	9	62
6	00	(Australia) Craig Lowndes	Gibson Motorsport	Ford Falcon (AU)	20	+ 17.71	6	58
7	15	(Australia) Todd Kelly	Tom Walkinshaw Racing Australia	Holden Commodore (VX)	20	+ 18.49	7	54
8	2	(Australia) Jason Bright	Holden Racing Team	Holden Commodore (VX)	20	+ 22.63	10	50
9	6	(New Zealand) Steven Richards	Glenn Seton Racing	Ford Falcon (AU)	20	+ 23.22	14	48
10	3	(Australia) Cameron McConville	Lansvale Racing Team	Holden Commodore (VX)	20	+ 24.08	12	46
11	31	(Australia) Steven Ellery	Steven Ellery Racing	Ford Falcon (AU)	20	+ 27.26	15	44
12	40	(Australia) Cameron McLean	Paragon Motorsport	Ford Falcon (AU)	20	+ 27.95	19	42
13	600	(Australia) John Bowe	Briggs Motorsport	Ford Falcon (AU)	20	+ 28.41	13	40
14	34	(Australia) Garth Tander	Garry Rogers Motorsport	Holden Commodore (VX)	20	+ 30.02	23	38
15	54	(Australia) Tony Longhurst	Rod Nash Racing	Holden Commodore (VX)	20	+ 30.66	17	36
16	4	(Australia) Marcos Ambrose	Stone Brothers Racing	Ford Falcon (AU)	20	+ 31.10	18	34
17	21	(Australia) Brad Jones	Brad Jones Racing	Ford Falcon (AU)	20	+ 32.57	22	32
18	43	(Australia) Paul Weel	Paul Weel Racing	Ford Falcon (AU)	20	+ 34.99	16	30
19	23	(Australia) Steve Reed	Lansvale Racing Team	Holden Commodore (VS)	20	+ 35.53	25	28
20	10	(Australia) Mark Larkham	Larkham Motorsport	Ford Falcon (AU)	20	+ 39.34	21	26
21	7	(Australia) Rodney Forbes	Gibson Motorsport	Ford Falcon (AU)	20	+ 39.65	24	24
22	11	(Australia) Larry Perkins	Perkins Engineering	Holden Commodore (VX)	20	+ 47.61	31	22
23	75	(Australia) Anthony Tratt	Paul Little Racing	Ford Falcon (AU)	20	+ 49.33	30	20
24	021	(New Zealand) Jason Richards	Team Kiwi Racing	Holden Commodore (VT)	20	+ 49.61	28	18
25	46	(New Zealand) John Faulkner	John Faulkner Racing	Holden Commodore (VX)	20	+ 49.86	27	16
26	24	(Australia) Paul Romano	Romano Racing	Holden Commodore (VX)	20	+ 50.03	32	14
27	84	(Australia) Daniel Miller	Miller Racing	Holden Commodore (VS)	20	+ 51.20	26	12
28	9	(Australia) David Besnard	Stone Brothers Racing	Ford Falcon (AU)	20	+ 56.89	20	10
29	14	(Australia) Tony Ricciardello	Imrie Motor Sport	Holden Commodore (VX)	19	+ 1 lap	29	8
30	5	(Australia) Glenn Seton	Glenn Seton Racing	Ford Falcon (AU)	18	+ 2 laps	4	6
31	29	(Australia) Paul Morris	Paul Morris Motorsport	Holden Commodore (VX)	16	+ 4 laps	8	4
Ret	35	(Australia) Jason Bargwanna	Garry Rogers Motorsport	Holden Commodore (VX)	3	Spun off	11	
Fastest Lap: Paul Radisich (Dick Johnson Racing) - 0:58.7317 on lap 4

=== Race 3 ===
Mark Larkham failed to make the start after a suspension failure on the warm-up lap sent his Falcon into the run-off where it eventually flipped over.

Ingall challenged Skaife for second off the line, but the Holden Racing Team driver held his ground to retain second, behind Radisich. The spirited start by Ingall was curtailed when he was adjudged to have jumped the start, and was issued a stop-go penalty for the offence. Marcos Ambrose was issued the same penalty for the same reason. Contact with Garth Tander on the pit straight saw Steven Ellery launched into a spin; miraculously avoiding being t-boned by the oncoming traffic.

The day for Perkins Engineering didn't get much better when contact with Brad Jones saw Larry Perkins spear off into the outfield. Glenn Seton's difficult weekend culminated in an engine failure that ended his race on lap five. Up the front, Skaife was utilising his fresh allocation of tyres to keep Radisich within striking distance. However, the gap remained fairly stagnant for the duration of the race and Radisich held on to claim his third straight victory to perfect a clean sweep of the weekend. Murphy held on to third place despite enormous pressure from Johnson in the dying laps of the race.

Pos	No	Driver	Team	Car	Laps	Time	Grid	Points
1	18	(New Zealand) Paul Radisich	Dick Johnson Racing	Ford Falcon (AU)	20	19min 54.3879sec	1	90
2	1	(Australia) Mark Skaife	Holden Racing Team	Holden Commodore (VX)	20	+ 1.05	2	80
3	51	(New Zealand) Greg Murphy	Tom Walkinshaw Racing Australia	Holden Commodore (VX)	20	+ 4.50	4	72
4	17	(Australia) Steven Johnson	Dick Johnson Racing	Ford Falcon (AU)	20	+ 4.69	5	66
5	00	(Australia) Craig Lowndes	Gibson Motorsport	Ford Falcon (AU)	20	+ 9.77	6	62
6	15	(Australia) Todd Kelly	Tom Walkinshaw Racing Australia	Holden Commodore (VX)	20	+ 9.94	7	58
7	2	(Australia) Jason Bright	Holden Racing Team	Holden Commodore (VX)	20	+ 16.20	8	54
8	34	(Australia) Garth Tander	Garry Rogers Motorsport	Holden Commodore (VX)	20	+ 16.53	14	50
9	6	(New Zealand) Steven Richards	Glenn Seton Racing	Ford Falcon (AU)	20	+ 18.98	9	48
10	3	(Australia) Cameron McConville	Lansvale Racing Team	Holden Commodore (VX)	20	+ 19.60	10	46
11	40	(Australia) Cameron McLean	Paragon Motorsport	Ford Falcon (AU)	20	+ 21.43	12	44
12	35	(Australia) Jason Bargwanna	Garry Rogers Motorsport	Holden Commodore (VX)	20	+ 21.64	32	42
13	600	(Australia) John Bowe	Briggs Motorsport	Holden Commodore (VX)	20	+ 21.86	13	40
14	43	(Australia) Paul Weel	Paul Weel Racing	Ford Falcon (AU)	20	+ 25.87	18	38
15	021	(New Zealand) Jason Richards	Team Kiwi Racing	Holden Commodore (VT)	20	+ 26.26	24	36
16	54	(Australia) Tony Longhurst	Rod Nash Racing	Holden Commodore (VX)	20	+ 27.13	15	34
17	8	(Australia) Russell Ingall	Perkins Engineering	Holden Commodore (VX)	20	+ 27.94	3	32
18	23	(Australia) Steve Reed	Lansvale Racing Team	Holden Commodore (VS)	20	+ 33.59	19	30
19	7	(Australia) Rodney Forbes	Gibson Motorsport	Ford Falcon (AU)	20	+ 34.09	21	28
20	75	(Australia) Anthony Tratt	Paul Little Racing	Ford Falcon (AU)	20	+ 34.79	23	26
21	31	(Australia) Steven Ellery	Steven Ellery Racing	Ford Falcon (AU)	20	+ 35.13	11	24
22	9	(Australia) David Besnard	Stone Brothers Racing	Ford Falcon (AU)	20	+ 39.33	28	22
23	46	(New Zealand) John Faulkner	John Faulkner Racing	Holden Commodore (VT)	20	+ 39.70	25	20
24	4	(Australia) Marcos Ambrose	Stone Brothers Racing	Ford Falcon (AU)	20	+ 40.29	16	18
25	84	(Australia) Daniel Miller	Miller Racing	Holden Commodore (VS)	20	+ 40.88	27	16
26	24	(Australia) Paul Romano	Romano Racing	Holden Commodore (VX)	20	+ 41.35	26	14
27	11	(Australia) Larry Perkins	Perkins Engineering	Holden Commodore (VX)	20	+ 58.70	22	12
28	21	(Australia) Brad Jones	Brad Jones Racing	Ford Falcon (AU)	19	+ 1 lap	17	10
29	14	(Australia) Tony Ricciardello	Imrie Motorsport	Holden Commodore (VX)	19	+ 1 lap	29	8
Ret	5	(Australia) Glenn Seton	Glenn Seton Racing	Ford Falcon (AU)	5	Engine	30	
Ret	10	(Australia) Mark Larkham	Larkham Motorsport	Ford Falcon (AU)	0	Accident	20	
Fastest Lap: Paul Radisich (Dick Johnson Racing) - 0:59.6357 on lap 5

== Championship points ==
Round points tally

Pos.	No	Driver	Team	Pts
1	18	(New Zealand) Paul Radisich	Dick Johnson Racing	288
2	1	(Australia) Mark Skaife	Holden Racing Team	252
3	51	(New Zealand) Greg Murphy	Tom Walkinshaw Racing Australia	209
4	8	(Australia) Russell Ingall	Perkins Engineering	189
5	00	(Australia) Craig Lowndes	Gibson Motorsport	188

Drivers' Championship standings after Round 6

Pos.	No	Driver	Team	Pts
1	1	(Australia) Mark Skaife	Holden Racing Team	1612
2	2	(Australia) Jason Bright	Holden Racing Team	1503
3	8	(Australia) Russell Ingall	Perkins Engineering	1268
4	17	(Australia) Steven Johnson	Dick Johnson Racing	1258
5	51	(New Zealand) Greg Murphy	Tom Walkinshaw Racing Australia	1121
