= Jason Richards =

New Zealand motor racing driver (1976–2011)

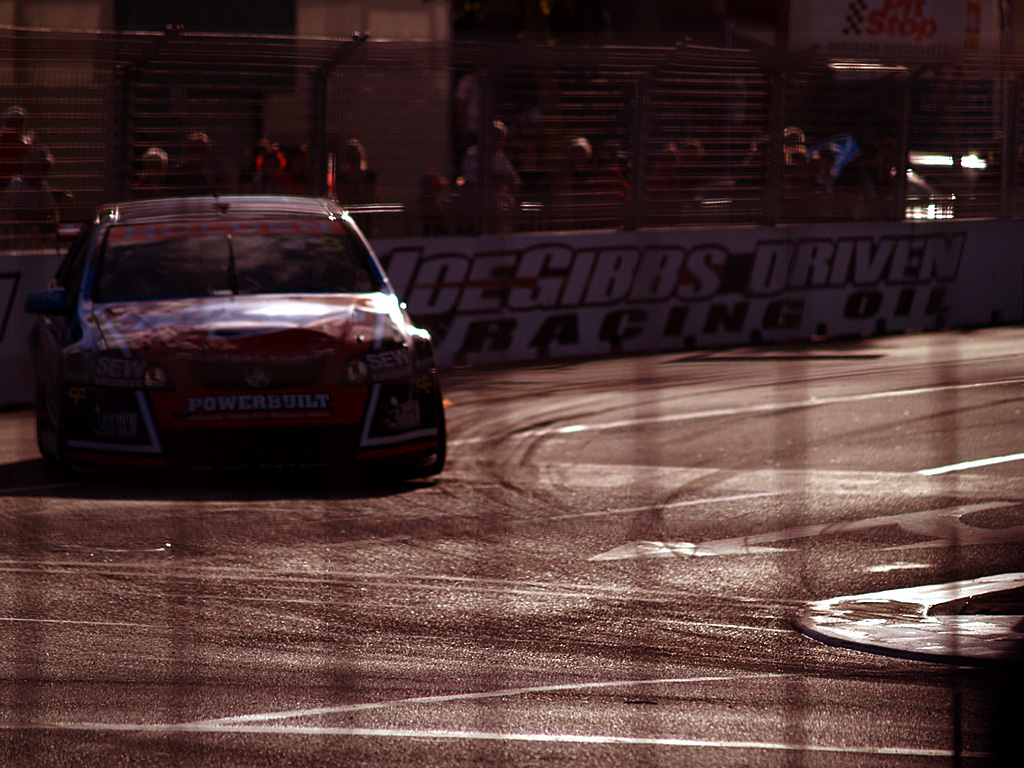
- Richards competing in the 2008 Hamilton 400
- Nationality: (New Zealand) New Zealander
- Born: Jason John Richards; 10 April 1976 Nelson, New Zealand
- Died: 15 December 2011 (aged 35) Melbourne, Victoria, Australia
- Retired: 2011

V8 Supercar Championship Series
- Years active: 2000–2010
- Teams: Team Kiwi Racing; Team Dynamik; Tasman Motorsport; Brad Jones Racing
- Starts: 131
- Wins: 1
- Poles: 2
- Fastest laps: 1
- Best finish: 14th in 2004, 2007 & 2009

Previous series
- 1985–93 1994 1995 1995 1995–2000 2011 2011: Karts; New Zealand Mini 7's New Zealand Formula Ford; British Formula Ford Championship; New Zealand Touring Car Championship; Australian GT Championship; Development V8 Supercar

Championship titles
- 1998/99, 1999/00, 2000/01: New Zealand Touring Car Championship

Jason John Richards (10 April 1976 – 15 December 2011) was a New Zealand racing driver who won multiple championships throughout his homeland in New Zealand and competed in the V8 Supercar Championship Series in Australia from 2000 to 2010.

After the success found in the New Zealand Touring Car Championship, he moved to Australia to pursue a career in the Australian-based V8 Supercar Championship Series. Richards made his debut in the 2000 Bathurst 1000 with Team Kiwi Racing and would make his full-time debut in the category with them for 2001. He moved to Team Dynamik for 2003 before settling at Tasman Motorsport for 2004. Despite lacking funding of the top teams, Richards demonstrated his abilities through a series of very strong drives. Including podiums in both 2005 endurance events at Sandown and Bathurst. His first and only win the category came in the reverse-grid race at Winton in 2006. In 2009, he moved to Brad Jones Racing where he achieved his first pole position at Hidden Valley in 2009. Later that season, he would finish second in the Bathurst 1000 with Cameron McConville.

Toward the end of 2010, Richards was diagnosed with cancer which brought his racing career to an abrupt halt. He continued to race sporadically up until his death just over a year later. The racing community continue to pay tribute to the Kiwi with initiatives such as the Jason Richards Memorial Trophy which is awarded annually.

== Early career ==
Richards started his motor racing career at the age of eight in 1985. Based at the Nelson Kart Club, he competed in a variety of championships throughout New Zealand which resulted in a total of 35 championship victories. In October 1992, he made his car racing debut in Mini 7s, where he placed sixth in his first race. For 1993, he would compete in the New Zealand and South Island Mini 7 Championships. His uptick in results netted him the Most Improved Driver award and secured third place in both championships. He also scored the most pole positions of any driver that season.

=== Formula Ford ===
Soon afterwards, Richards began making concerted efforts to break into open-wheel racing cars. He tested with Ashley Stichbury at Oulton Park for Andy Welch Motorsport with ambitions to compete in the British Formula Ford Championship and Formula Ford Festival. However, these plans fell through. He also applied for the Shell Ultra Challenge Formula Ford Scholarship back home in New Zealand and although he failed to win the program, he impressed enough to earn a call-up for the Nissan Mobil 500 Formula Ford support races at Wellington and Pukekohe. The late notice of this call-up was such that it came only hours before the first practice session while Richards was sitting an examination at Waimea College. Despite the lack of experience, Richards impressed with solid results in both events including a strong drive in the rain-affected second race in Wellington.

In 1994, Richards would earn a drive for John Crawford's Racing School team in the Formula Ford Winter Series while maintaining a role at the school as a racing instructor. He would finish the season second overall to teammate Andrew Neale. Later that season, he would compete in the New Zealand Formula Ford Championship with the same team. Throughout the season, he would engage in a bitter battle with championship rival, Shane Drake. Both drivers traded wins and came into contact constantly. Richards ultimately finished runner up to Drake in overall points. Following this season, Richards would make the transition to the touring car category.

=== Touring cars ===
For 1995, Richards signed for International Motorsport, running under the BMW Motorsport NZ banner, to compete in the New Zealand Touring Car Championship. Competing in just six races for the 1995–96 season, Richards won two races and placed seventh in the overall standings. The following year marked his first full season in the category. He was unable to win a race that season although improved his position in the championship standings to fourth. In the same year, Richards was afforded a one-off drive in the Australian Super Touring Championship for CPW Motorsport at Amaroo Park.

In his third season, Richards won five out of 12 races and finished runner-up in the points standings to teammate, Brett Riley. Richards also won that years New Zealand Racing Drivers Club Series, winning five of the eight races that season. In 1999, Richards dominated the year by way of winning all 12 races and took his first New Zealand Touring Car Championship title. A similar form of dominance in 2000, with 11 wins from 18 races, saw Richards claim his second consecutive championship. The 2001 season saw Richards move to the newly-established Team Kiwi Racing, still driving with BMW machinery. Richards went on to claim a third consecutive championship with eight wins. Despite establishing himself as the benchmark of the championship in this time, his move to Team Kiwi Racing was part of a bigger plan in a bid to further his racing career. Just before the start of the 2000–01 New Zealand Touring Car Championship, Team Kiwi Racing had made their debut in the V8 Supercar Championship Series at Bathurst with Richards as one of its drivers. The following season, the team, along with Richards, would transition in the V8 Supercar category full-time.

== V8 Supercars ==
=== Team Kiwi Racing ===
Richards, along with Team Kiwi Racing, made their debut at the 2000 FAI 1000. Driving alongside Angus Fogg, the team qualified 23rd and finishing 16th. Considering the relative lack of experience and resources, it was a commendable performance from the outfit.

In 2001, the team would partake the full calendar year with Richards. The inefficient resources and testing restrictions severely compromised the teams efforts, and this was noted by Richards' failure to qualifying in the opening round at Phillip Island and at the third round at Eastern Creek. Richards first solo race came at the Clipsal 500 in Adelaide although his race was ended soon after it began owing to heavy damage sustained in an accident on the opening lap. The next day in race two, he battled through the pack to finish 16th after starting 38th. In what was much of a learning year, the rest of the season past without much incident or note. The highlight of the season arguably came at Pukekohe when Richards placed fourth in the rain-affected first race of the weekend. Despite struggling to match the result for the remainder of the weekend, his performance was lauded by onlookers.

The 2002 season wasn't set to be any easier for the New Zealand outfit. Still running an older-spec VT Commodore handed down from Perkins Engineering, Richards struggled to break into the top-20 on most weekends. Although the results began to pick up as the season went on. The standout performance of the season came in Canberra where Richards placed third in the reverse-grid race, once again drawing praise. It was the first podium for Richards and for the team itself. It was noted that multiple teams in the paddock had taken an interest in the Kiwi. This included Kieran Wills, father of racing driver Simon Wills, who was set to enter his own team in the championship for 2003. At the end of 2002, Richards left Team Kiwi Racing to join Wills at Team Dynamik.

=== Team Dynamik ===
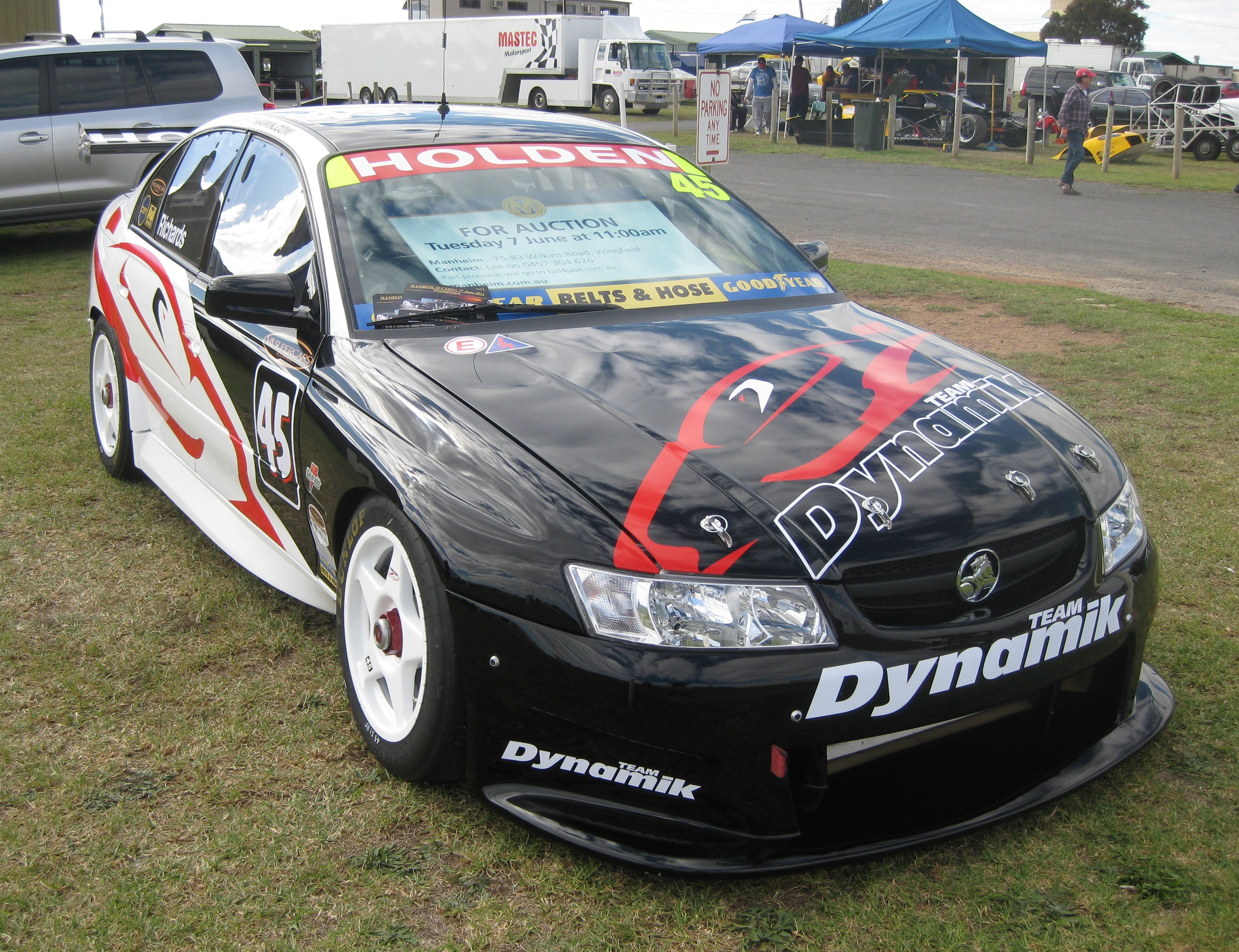
The VZ Commodore that Richards drove throughout the 2003 season

Richards moved to the newly-established Team Dynamik based in South Australia in 2003. Despite the team struggling for pace, Richards would put in some strong drives. The most notable of them came in the Sandown 500. He and co-driver Simon Wills qualified fifth for the race and had stayed out of trouble for most of the race. With a handful of laps remaining, Richards began to close rapidly on race leader, Mark Skaife. As Skaife began to struggle with electrical problems, Richards began to hound the rear of the Holden Racing Team Commodore. On the penultimate lap, Richards made a move for the lead. However, Richards slid off the road and into the sand trap, obliterating what would have been he and Team Dynamik's best result in the category.

Other notable events included an impressive fifth-placing at Oran Park. At his home event at Pukekohe, he was forced to withdraw from the weekend after enduring a spectacular rollover in practice.

=== Tasman Motorsport ===
Following the conclusion of the 2003 season, Richards left Team Dynamik to join the newly-formed Tasman Motorsport outfit ahead of the 2004 season. As the teams sole full-time driver, Richards enjoyed regular appearances in the top ten throughout the season and while he could not acquire a podium, he did finish the year 14th in the standings; a stark improvement over 26th from the previous season.

In 2005, the team upgraded to a two-car outfit and Richards would be joined by Jamie Whincup. The team would also move its premises from Sydney to Melbourne and they had acquired major title sponsorship from Dodo Services. Richards would show strong pace throughout the season although he struggled to translate it into results. The early part of his season was plagued with mechanical problems and at the 2005 round at Queensland, he suffered a major rollover that destroyed his vehicle. Richards quickly returned to stride and placed the repaired Commodore sixth in the next round at Oran Park. The highlight of the season came in the endurance events where, paired with Whincup, he achieved a third-placing in the Sandown 500 and placed second in the Bathurst 1000 after a late-race battle with eventual winner, Mark Skaife. These results helped cement Richards' place in the category and his reputation had solidified.

Richards started the 2006 season strongly by taking provisional pole position for the Clipsal 500 Adelaide. The season also saw the reintroduction of reverse-grid races into the championship. Out of these came two of Richards' best results of the year. In the first instance at Pukekohe, he finished second to Garth Tander thereby claiming his first podium of the year. And at the Winton round, Richards capitilised on his front row start to claim his first and only victory in his V8 Supercar career. He also claimed podiums at Hidden Valley and in the final race of the year at Phillip Island.

For 2007, Richards would be partnered with a new teammate in the form of Greg Murphy. The season strongpoints for Richards included podiums at Surfers Paradise and Symmons Plains, with Richards claiming third-overall in round points for the former. At the Bathurst 1000, he and Murphy were part of a four-car battle for victory. They ultimately missed out on the podium although did finish the first Holden on the road. While the year proved to be tough in terms of results, 2008 would prove to be even trickier. Richards missed a total of four races owing to accidents and mechanical problems sustained in Wanneroo, Winton and Bahrain. The sole podium of the year came at Bathurst after a late-race pass from Murphy on Steven Richards to claim second place.

=== Brad Jones Racing ===
At the conclusion of 2008, Richards announced he would move to Brad Jones Racing starting from the 2009 season. He found good success straight away by finishing fifth overall for the opening round in Adelaide. Results thereafter were generally mixed although two highlights included a maiden pole position at Hidden Valley and a podium at the Bathurst 1000. Having qualified on provisional pole position, Richards demonstrated strong pace throughout the weekend. With a handful of laps to go, after the safety car restart, Richards found himself in third behind Todd Kelly. Soon after the restart, Richards made an audacious pass on Kelly at Forrest's Elbow and set off after race leader, Garth Tander. Within two laps, he had cut the lead won by almost three seconds and was within striking distance by the end of the final lap. Ultimately, the Kiwi had to settle for second and claimed his third Bathurst podium. These results, among others, re-ignited interest for Richards among the top teams. During the course of 2009, Richards was offered a contract to race for the Holden Racing Team. However, he turned down the offer as he wished to honour the agreement already in place with Brad Jones Racing. Furthermore, he had grown to appreciate the environment of the Albury-based team and wished to remain for as long as he could.

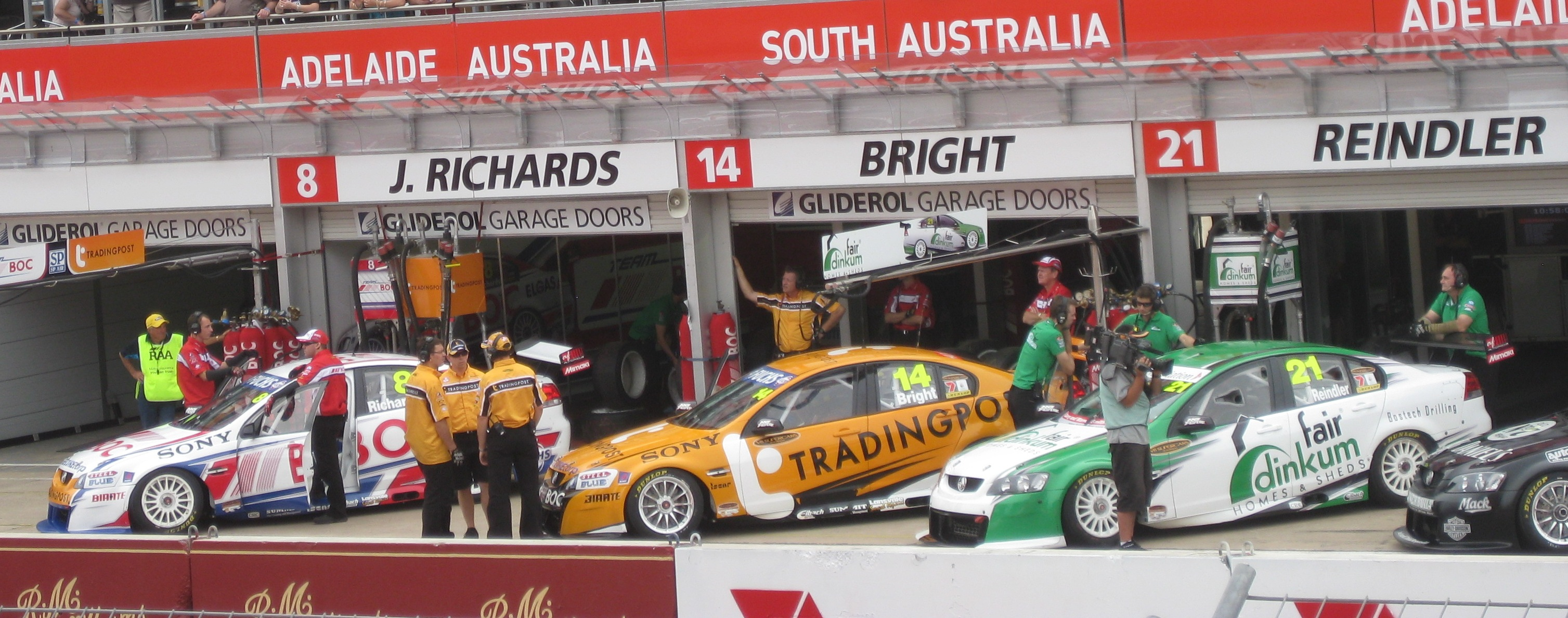
Richards' car (left) with in the 2010 Clipsal 500 pitlane

The beginning of Richards' 2010 campaign was relatively lukewarm with the Kiwi struggling for any meaningful results in the opening two rounds in the Middle East. As the year went on however, the results were getting stronger. From Hidden Valley to Townsville, he had amassed a succession of top ten finishes and come the L&H 500 at Phillip Island, he and co-driver Andrew Jones would finish on third and on the podium. Bathurst that year proved disappointing with Richards being involved in a big crash at Forrest's Elbow in practice which bent the chassis rails and forced the team to miss qualifying. The race proved no better, finishing in 23rd and seven laps down. Richards would partake in another two events that season in Surfers Paradise and Symmons Plains. After the diagnosis of his cancer was made public, he stepped down from full-time driving duties while Andrew Jones commandeered the seat for the remainder of the year.

Throughout 2011, while still battling cancer, Richards continued to play a vital role within the Brad Jones Racing team. He completed testing duties throughout the year and deputised for Jason Bargwanna at the non-championship round at the Formula One support race at Albert Park. In the second race of the weekend, Richards finished second in a soul-stirring drive that would ultimately prove to be his last podium in the category.

In the first round of the 2011 Fujitsu V8 Supercar Series, Richards made a one-off appearance for Greg Murphy Racing and stunned the paddock by winning the second race of the event.

== Illness and death ==
In November 2010, it was revealed that Richards was admitted to hospital on November 16 and was later diagnosed with an adrenocortical carcinoma. Richards immediately stepped away from racing to devote his energies to fighting the illness with Andrew Jones substituting for the balance of the 2010 season. He continued to race sporadically with guest appearances in the Fujitsu V8 Supercar Series, Australian GT Championship, Touring Car Masters, and continued testing with Brad Jones Racing into the second half of 2011.

On December 15, 2011, Richards passed away at his home. He is survived by wife Charlotte, and his two daughters, Sienna and Olivia.

== Legacy ==
Starting from the 2012 season, Brad Jones Racing imposed a special star logo bearing Richards' initials on the driver side of each car the team ran. Richards' local kart club in Nelson runs an annual event across all classes under the moniker of the Jason Richards Grand Prix.

In 2012, an illustrated documentary of his life was released.

=== Jason Richards Memorial Trophy ===
Since 2013, the driver who scores the most points across all races during the weekend of the New Zealand round/s of the Supercars Championship has received the Jason Richards Memorial Trophy. The trophy was introduced when the series returned to Pukekohe in 2013, replacing the Mark Porter Memorial Trophy presented at the Hamilton 400. It then moved with the event to Taupō in 2024, following Pukekohe's closure, and expanded to two events from 2026 with the addition of the Christchurch Supercars round.

Jason Bright and Brad Jones Racing, Richards' last teammate and team respectively, were the first winners of the trophy. In 2015 and 2017, Jamie Whincup, who was a teammate of Richards in 2005 at Tasman Motorsport and co-drove with him to a second-place finish at the 2005 Bathurst 1000, won the trophy.

==== Winners ====
Year	Driver	Team	Car	Venue
2013	(Australia) Jason Bright	Brad Jones Racing	Holden Commodore (VF)	Pukekohe
2014	(Australia) Mark Winterbottom	Ford Performance Racing	Ford Falcon (FG)	Pukekohe
2015	(Australia) Jamie Whincup	Triple Eight Race Engineering	Holden Commodore (VF)	Pukekohe
2016	(New Zealand) Shane van Gisbergen	Triple Eight Race Engineering	Holden Commodore (VF)	Pukekohe
2017	(Australia) Jamie Whincup	Triple Eight Race Engineering	Holden Commodore (VF)	Pukekohe
2018	(New Zealand) Scott McLaughlin	DJR Team Penske	Ford Falcon (FG X)	Pukekohe
2019	(New Zealand) Shane van Gisbergen	Triple Eight Race Engineering	Holden Commodore (ZB)	Pukekohe
2022	(New Zealand) Shane van Gisbergen	Triple Eight Race Engineering	Holden Commodore (ZB)	Pukekohe
2024	(Australia) Anton De Pasquale	Dick Johnson Racing	Ford Mustang (S650)	Taupō
2025	(New Zealand) Matt Payne	Grove Racing	Ford Mustang (S650)	Taupō
2026	(Australia) Broc Feeney	Triple Eight Race Engineering	Ford Mustang (S650)	Taupō and Christchurch

== Career results ==
=== Career summary ===
Season	Series	Team	Races	Wins	Poles	F. Laps	Podiums	Points	Position
1994	New Zealand Formula Ford Winter Series	John Crawford's Racing School	?	?	?	?	?	?	**2nd**
1994–95	New Zealand Formula Ford Championship	John Crawford's Racing School	?	?	?	?	?	?	**2nd**
1995	British Formula Ford Championship	?	?	?	?	?	?	?	N/A
1995–96	New Zealand Touring Car Championship	International Motorsport	6	2	?	?	2	55	7th
1996–97	New Zealand Touring Car Championship	International Motorsport	18	0	3	1	6	329	4th
1997	Australian Super Touring Championship	CPW Motorsport	2	0	0	0	0	7	17th
1997–98	New Zealand Touring Car Championship	International Motorsport	12	5	1	5	11	291	**2nd**
1997–98	New Zealand Racing Drivers Club Series	International Motorsport	8	5	5	4	8	154	**1st**
1998–99	New Zealand Touring Car Championship	International Motorsport	12	12	7	12	12	240	**1st**
1999–00	New Zealand Touring Car Championship	International Motorsport	18	11	12	12	15	279	**1st**
2000	Shell Championship Series	Team Kiwi Racing	1	0	0	0	0	48	51st
2000–01	New Zealand Touring Car Championship	Team Kiwi Racing	18	8	4	6	11	484	**1st**
2001	Shell Championship Series	Team Kiwi Racing	27	0	0	0	0	1146	24th
2002	V8 Supercar Championship Series	Team Kiwi Racing	29	0	0	0	1	544	19th
2003	V8 Supercar Championship Series	Team Dynamik	19	0	0	0	0	909	26th
2004	V8 Supercar Championship Series	Tasman Motorsport	26	0	0	0	0	1245	14th
2005	V8 Supercar Championship Series	Tasman Motorsport	30	0	0	0	2	1295	17th
2005	Biante Model Cars Historic Touring Car Series		3	0	0	0	0	38	18th
2006	V8 Supercar Championship Series	Tasman Motorsport	34	1	0	1	4	1993	18th
2007	V8 Supercar Championship Series	Tasman Motorsport	37	0	0	0	2	235	14th
2008	V8 Supercar Championship Series	Tasman Motorsport	34	0	0	0	1	1548	17th
2009	V8 Supercar Championship Series	Brad Jones Racing	28	0	1	0	1	1756	14th
2010	V8 Supercar Championship Series	Brad Jones Racing	22	0	0	0	1	1547	17th
2011	Fujitsu V8 Supercar Series	Greg Murphy Racing	2	1	0	0	1	219	29th
2011	Australian GT Championship	Maranello Motorsport	2	0	0	0	0	44	23rd
2011	Touring Car Masters		3	0	0	1	2	N/A	N/A

=== Supercars Championship results ===
(Races in bold indicate pole position) (Races in italics indicate fastest lap)

Supercars results
Year	Team	Car	1	2	3	4	5	6	7	8	9	10	11	12	13	14	15	16	17	18	19	20	21	22	23	24	25	26	27	28	29	30	31	32	33	34	35	36	37	38	39	Position	Points
2000	Team Kiwi Racing	Holden Commodore (VT)	PHI; R1	PHI; R2	BAR; R3	BAR; R4	BAR; R5	ADE; R6	ADE; R7	EAS; R8	EAS; R9	EAS; R10	HDV; R11	HDV; R12	HDV; R13	CAN; R14	CAN; R15	CAN; R16	QLD; R17	QLD; R18	QLD; R19	WIN; R20	WIN; R21	WIN; R22	ORA; R23	ORA; R24	ORA; R25	CAL; R26	CAL; R27	CAL; R28	QLD; R29	SAN; R30	SAN; R31	SAN; R32	BAT; R33; 16							51st	48
2001	Team Kiwi Racing	Holden Commodore (VT)	PHI; R1; DNQ	PHI; R2; DNQ	ADE; R3; Ret	ADE; R4; 16	EAS; R5; DNQ	EAS; R6; DNQ	HDV; R7; 24	HDV; R8; 18	HDV; R9; 23	CAN; R10; 20	CAN; R11; 15	CAN; R12; 21	BAR; R13; 28	BAR; R14; 24	BAR; R15; 15	CAL; R16; Ret	CAL; R17; 23	CAL; R18; 24	ORA; R19; 20	ORA; R20; 21	QLD; R21; 13	WIN; R22; 26	WIN; R23; 17	BAT; R24; 16	PUK; R25; 4	PUK; R26; 23	PUK; R27; 22	SAN; R28; 19	SAN; R29; 9	SAN; R30; 16										24th	1146
2002	Team Kiwi Racing	Holden Commodore (VT)	ADE; R1; 15	ADE; R2; 21	PHI; R3; Ret	PHI; R4; 25	EAS; R5; 17	EAS; R6; 25	EAS; R7; 18	HDV; R8; 27	HDV; R9; 25	HDV; R10; 23	CAN; R11; 26	CAN; R12; 3	CAN; R13; 10	BAR; R14; 26	BAR; R15; 14	BAR; R16; 20	ORA; R17; 18	ORA; R18; 25	WIN; R19; 23	WIN; R20; 20	QLD; R21; 22	BAT; R22; 11	SUR; R23; 14	SUR; R24; 8	PUK; R25; 16	PUK; R26; 14	PUK; R27; Ret	SAN; R28; 16	SAN; R29; 18											19th	544
2003	Team Dynamik	Holden Commodore (VY)	ADE; R1; 28	ADE; R1; Ret	PHI; R3; 28	EAS; R4; 21	WIN; R5; 15	BAR; R6; 28	BAR; R7; 12	BAR; R8; 25	HDV; R9; 16	HDV; R10; 31	HDV; R11; 24	QLD; R12; 20	ORA; R13; 5	SAN; R14; Ret	BAT; R15; 22	SUR; R16; 23	SUR; R17; Ret	PUK; R18; Wth	PUK; R19; Wth	PUK; R20; Wth	EAS; R21; 14	EAS; R22; 21																		26th	909
2004	Tasman Motorsport	Holden Commodore (VY)	ADE; R1; Ret	ADE; R2; 8	EAS; R3; Ret	PUK; R4; 14	PUK; R5; 9	PUK; R6; 9	HDV; R7; 25	HDV; R8; 27	HDV; R9; Ret	BAR; R10; 20	BAR; R11; 12	BAR; R12; 14	QLD; R13; Ret	WIN; R14; 11	ORA; R15; 7	ORA; R16; 8	SAN; R17; 9	BAT; R18; 20	SUR; R19; 9	SUR; R20; 8	SYM; R21; 25	SYM; R22; 25	SYM; R23; 20	EAS; R24; 17	EAS; R25; 5	EAS; R26; 9														14th	1245
2005	Tasman Motorsport	Holden Commodore (VZ)	ADE; R1; 20	ADE; R2; Ret	PUK; R3; 18	PUK; R4; 29	PUK; R5; 14	BAR; R6; 7	BAR; R7; 25	BAR; R8; 17	EAS; R9; 10	EAS; R10; 12	SHA; R11; 8	SHA; R12; Ret	SHA; R13; Ret	HDV; R14; 25	HDV; R15; 6	HDV; R16; 15	QLD; R17; Ret	ORA; R18; 6	ORA; R19; 28	SAN; R20; 3	BAT; R21; 2	SUR; R22; 6	SUR; R23; Ret	SUR; R24; 19	SYM; R25; 11	SYM; R26; 8	SYM; R27; 14	PHI; R28; 17	PHI; R29; 11	PHI; R30; 16										17th	1295
2006	Tasman Motorsport	Holden Commodore (VZ)	ADE; R1; Ret	ADE; R2; 10	PUK; R3; 28	PUK; R4; 2	PUK; R5; 19	BAR; R6; 18	BAR; R7; 9	BAR; R8; 8	WIN; R9; 27	WIN; R10; 1	WIN; R11; 8	HDV; R12; 6	HDV; R13; 14	HDV; R14; 2	QLD; R15; 17	QLD; R16; 24	QLD; R17; 16	ORA; R18; 6	ORA; R19; Ret	ORA; R20; 15	SAN; R21; 30	BAT; R22; Ret	SUR; R23; 4	SUR; R24; 5	SUR; R25; Ret	SYM; R26; 12	SYM; R27; 12	SYM; R28; 13	BHR; R29; 23	BHR; R30; 10	BHR; R31; Ret	PHI; R32; 22	PHI; R33; 12	PHI; R34; 3						18th	1993
2007	Tasman Motorsport	Holden Commodore (VE)	ADE; R1; 20	ADE; R2; 13	BAR; R3; 14	BAR; R4; 12	BAR; R5; 19	PUK; R6; 7	PUK; R7; Ret	PUK; R8; 18	WIN; R9; 23	WIN; R10; Ret	WIN; R11; 16	EAS; R12; 13	EAS; R13; 24	EAS; R14; 16	HDV; R15; 10	HDV; R16; 10	HDV; R17; 9	QLD; R18; Ret	QLD; R19; 13	QLD; R20; 8	ORA; R21; 11	ORA; R22; 5	ORA; R23; 6	SAN; R24; 14	BAT; R25; 4	SUR; R26; 10	SUR; R27; 6	SUR; R28; 2	BHR; R29; 16	BHR; R30; 13	BHR; R31; 15	SYM; R32; 10	SYM; R33; 7	SYM; R34; 3	PHI; R35; 17	PHI; R36; 26	PHI; R37; Ret			14th	235
2008	Tasman Motorsport	Holden Commodore (VE)	ADE; R1; 13	ADE; R2; 8	EAS; R3; 12	EAS; R4; 16	EAS; R5; 19	HAM; R6; 20	HAM; R7; 9	HAM; R8; 14	BAR; R9; Ret	BAR; R10; DNS	BAR; R11; DNS	SAN; R12; 18	SAN; R13; 20	SAN; R14; 16	HDV; R15; 6	HDV; R16; 7	HDV; R17; Ret	QLD; R18; 14	QLD; R19; 14	QLD; R20; 22	WIN; R21; 4	WIN; R22; Ret	WIN; R23; DNS	PHI; Q 6	PHI; R24; Ret	BAT; R25; 2	SUR; R26; 13	SUR; R27; 17	SUR; R28; 11	BHR; R29; Ret	BHR; R30; DNS	BHR; R31; DNS	SYM; R32; 11	SYM; R33; 18	SYM; R34; 12	ORA; R35; 16	ORA; R36; 18	ORA; R37; 14		17th	1548
2009	Brad Jones Racing	Holden Commodore (VE)	ADE; R1; 5	ADE; R2; 7	HAM; R3; 10	HAM; R4; 22	WIN; R5; 13	WIN; R6; 26	SYM; R7; 8	SYM; R8; 23	HDV; R9; 7	HDV; R10; 11	TOW; R11; 23	TOW; R12; 12	SAN; R13; 19	SAN; R14; 6	QLD; R15; 21	QLD; R16; 17	PHI; Q 10	PHI; R17; Ret	BAT; R18; 2	SUR; R19; Ret	SUR; R20; 24	SUR; R21; 10	SUR; R22; 8	PHI; R23; 10	PHI; R24; 15	BAR; R25; 20	BAR; R26; 14	SYD; R27; 12	SYD; R28; Ret											14th	1756
2010	Brad Jones Racing	Holden Commodore (VE)	YMC; R1; 12	YMC; R2; 21	BHR; R3; 19	BHR; R4; 8	ADE; R5; Ret	ADE; R6; 9	HAM; R7; 11	HAM; R8; 11	QLD; R9; 22	QLD; R10; 13	WIN; R11; 19	WIN; R12; 13	HDV; R13; 4	HDV; R14; 7	TOW; R15; 7	TOW; R16; 8	PHI; R17; 3	BAT; R18; 23	SUR; R19; 15	SUR; R20; Ret	SYM; R21; 16	SYM; R22; 22	SAN; R23	SAN; R24	SYD; R25	SYD; R26														17th	1547

=== Complete Bathurst 1000 results ===
Year	Team	Car	Co-driver	Position	Laps
1997*	CPW Motorsport	BMW 318i	(New Zealand) Brett Riley	DNF	125
1998*	International Motorsport	BMW 320i	(New Zealand) Barrie Thomlinson	DNF	128
2000	Team Kiwi Racing	Holden VT Commodore	(New Zealand) Angus Fogg	16th	157
2001	Team Kiwi Racing	Holden VT Commodore	(New Zealand) Angus Fogg	16th	157
2002	Team Kiwi Racing	Holden VX Commodore	(New Zealand) Simon Wills	11th	160
2003	Team Dynamik	Holden VY Commodore	(New Zealand) Simon Wills	22nd	139
2004	Tasman Motorsport	Holden VY Commodore	(New Zealand) Fabian Coulthard	20th	152
2005	Tasman Motorsport	Holden VZ Commodore	(Australia) Jamie Whincup	**2nd**	161
2006	Tasman Motorsport	Holden VZ Commodore	(Australia) Andrew Jones	DNF	151
2007	Tasman Motorsport	Holden VE Commodore	(New Zealand) Greg Murphy	4th	161
2008	Tasman Motorsport	Holden VE Commodore	(New Zealand) Greg Murphy	**2nd**	161
2009	Brad Jones Racing	Holden VE Commodore	(Australia) Cameron McConville	**2nd**	161
2010	Brad Jones Racing	Holden VE Commodore	(Australia) Andrew Jones	23rd	157

* Super Touring race

Awards and achievements
Preceded by Inaugural	Peter Brock Medal; 2011	Succeeded by Craig Lowndes
