= 2006 Adelaide 500 =

Supercar 500 race

(South Australia) 2006 Adelaide 500
Event Information
- Round 1 of 13 in the 2006 V8 Supercar Championship Series
- Date: 23–26 March 2006
- Location: Adelaide, South Australia
- Venue: Adelaide Street Circuit
- Weather: Fine

Results
Race 1
Distance	78 laps	250 km
Pole position	Mark Skaife; Holden Racing Team	1:21.6102
Winner	Craig Lowndes; Triple Eight Race Engineering	2:04:18.5229
Race 2
Distance	78 laps	250 km
Winner	Jamie Whincup; Triple Eight Race Engineering	2:01:28.4014
Round Results
First	Jamie Whincup; Triple Eight Race Engineering	310 pts
Second	Rick Kelly; HSV Dealer Team	305 pts
Third	Todd Kelly; Holden Racing Team	290 pts

The 2006 Adelaide 500 Adelaide, known for naming rights reasons as the 2006 Clipsal 500, was the first round of the 2006 V8 Supercar Championship Series. It took place from 23 to 26 March 2006 and was eighth in a sequence of "Adelaide 500" events for V8 Supercars to be held at the Adelaide Parklands Circuit in Adelaide, South Australia.

== Qualifying ==
Qualifying took place on Friday, 24 March 2006. As in the case of most V8 Supercar races, there was a Top Ten Shootout which could make the person that qualified first drop to tenth and vice versa. Kiwi Jason Richards, in his Tasman Motorsport Holden qualified first.

=== Top Ten Shootout ===
The official name for the winner of the top team shootout winner is the Armor-All Pole Position Award. The Top Ten Shootout also took place on the Friday. The person who finished tenth in qualifying goes first, and First goes last. The drivers get only one lap to record their best time.

The Holden Racing Team got a one-two result in this, with Mark Skaife finishing first and Todd Kelly finishing second. The Lion (Holden) dominated the top ten shootout with 8 of the 10 drivers driving a VZ Commodore. There were only two Ford's in the Top Ten, Team Triple 888's Jamie Whincup and Craig Lowndes.

=== Qualifying results ===
Pos	No	Name	Team	Car	Time
1	3	(New Zealand) Jason Richards	Tasman Motorsport	Holden Commodore (VZ)	1:22.4429
2	88	(Australia) Jamie Whincup	Triple Eight Race Engineering	Ford Falcon (BA)	1:22.4429
3	2	(Australia) Mark Skaife	Holden Racing Team	Holden Commodore (VZ)	1:22.5251
4	22	(Australia) Todd Kelly	Holden Racing Team	Holden Commodore (VZ)	1:22.6433
5	16	(Australia) Garth Tander	HSV Dealer Team	Holden Commodore (VZ)	1:22.7321
6	11	(Australia) Paul Dumbrell	Perkins Engineering	Holden Commodore (VZ)	1:22.9215
7	5	(Australia) Mark Winterbottom	Ford Performance Racing	Ford Falcon (BA)	1:22.9480
8	4	(Australia) James Courtney	Stone Brothers Racing	Ford Falcon (BA)	1:23.0660
9	021	(New Zealand) Paul Radisich	Team Kiwi Racing	Holden Commodore (VZ)	1:23.0676
10	15	(Australia) Rick Kelly	HSV Dealer Team	Holden Commodore (VZ)	1:23.0940
11	8	(Brazil) Max Wilson	WPS Racing	Ford Falcon (BA)	1:23.1155
12	888	(Australia) Craig Lowndes	Triple Eight Race Engineering	Ford Falcon (BA)	1:23.1709
13	17	(Australia) Steven Johnson	Dick Johnson Racing	Ford Falcon (BA)	1:23.2279
14	67	(Australia) Paul Morris	Paul Morris Motorsport	Holden Commodore (VZ)	1:23.2337
15	1	(Australia) Russell Ingall	Stone Brothers Racing	Ford Falcon (BA)	1:23.2831
16	55	(Australia) Steve Owen	Rod Nash Racing	Holden Commodore (VZ)	1:23.3637
17	51	(New Zealand) Greg Murphy	Paul Weel Racing	Holden Commodore (VZ)	1:23.3992
18	18	(Australia) Will Davison	Dick Johnson Racing	Ford Falcon (BA)	1:23.4642
19	12	(Australia) John Bowe	Brad Jones Racing	Ford Falcon (BA)	1:23.5471
20	34	(Australia) Dean Canto	Garry Rogers Motorsport	Holden Commodore (VZ)	1:23.5671
21	14	(Australia) Brad Jones	Brad Jones Racing	Ford Falcon (BA)	1:23.5826
22	50	(Australia) Cameron McConville	Paul Weel Racing	Holden Commodore (VZ)	1:23.7558
23	23	(Australia) Andrew Jones	Tasman Motorsport	Holden Commodore (VZ)	1:23.8131
24	6	(Australia) Jason Bright	Ford Performance Racing	Ford Falcon (BA)	1:23.8927
25	39	(Australia) Alan Gurr	Paul Morris Motorsport	Holden Commodore (VZ)	1:23.9569
26	7	(New Zealand) Steven Richards	Perkins Engineering	Holden Commodore (VZ)	1:23.9585
27	33	(Australia) Lee Holdsworth	Garry Rogers Motorsport	Holden Commodore (VZ)	1:24.0235
28	10	(Australia) Jason Bargwanna	WPS Racing	Ford Falcon (BA)	1:24.0301
29	25	(Australia) Warren Luff	Britek Motorsport	Ford Falcon (BA)	1:24.0447
30	20	(Australia) Marcus Marshall	Paul Cruickshank Racing	Ford Falcon (BA)	1:24.9228
31	26	(Australia) José Fernández	Britek Motorsport	Ford Falcon (BA)	1:25.6745

=== Top Ten Shootout results ===
Pos	No	Name	Team	Vehicle	Time
1	2	(Australia) Mark Skaife	Holden Racing Team	Holden Commodore (VZ)	1:21.6102
2	22	(Australia) Todd Kelly	Holden Racing Team	Holden Commodore (VZ)	1:22.0198
3	16	(Australia) Garth Tander	HSV Dealer Team	Holden Commodore (VZ)	1:22.2222
4	3	(New Zealand) Jason Richards	Tasman Motorsport	Holden Commodore (VZ)	1:22.2318
5	11	(Australia) Paul Dumbrell	Perkins Engineering	Holden Commodore (VZ)	1:22.2323
6	88	(Australia) Jamie Whincup	Triple Eight Race Engineering	Ford Falcon (BA)	1:22.2405
7	888	(Australia) Craig Lowndes	Triple Eight Race Engineering	Ford Falcon (BA)	1:22.5121
8	15	(Australia) Rick Kelly	HSV Dealer Team	Holden Commodore (VZ)	1:22.5367
9	021	(New Zealand) Paul Radisich	Team Kiwi Racing	Holden Commodore (VZ)	1:22.5690
10	51	(New Zealand) Greg Murphy	Paul Weel Racing	Holden Commodore (VZ)	1:23.1496

== Race results ==
=== Race 1 ===
Pos	No	Driver	Team	Vehicle	Laps	Time	Grid
1	888	(Australia) Craig Lowndes	Triple Eight Race Engineering	Ford Falcon (BA)	78	2hr 04min 18.5229sec	7
2	15	(Australia) Rick Kelly	HSV Dealer Team	Holden Commodore (VZ)	78	+ 1.259	8
3	88	(Australia) Jamie Whincup	Triple Eight Race Engineering	Ford Falcon (BA)	78	+ 1.619	6
4	50	(Australia) Cameron McConville	Paul Weel Racing	Holden Commodore (VZ)	78	+ 2.774	22
5	51	(New Zealand) Greg Murphy	Paul Weel Racing	Holden Commodore (VZ)	78	+ 5.354	17
6	22	(Australia) Todd Kelly	Holden Racing Team	Holden Commodore (VZ)	78	+ 6.735	2
7	7	(New Zealand) Steven Richards	Perkins Engineering	Holden Commodore (VZ)	78	+ 8.381	26
8	16	(Australia) Garth Tander	HSV Dealer Team	Holden Commodore (VZ)	78	+ 9.477	3
9	1	(Australia) Russell Ingall	Stone Brothers Racing	Ford Falcon (BA)	78	+ 14.030	15
10	17	(Australia) Steven Johnson	Dick Johnson Racing	Ford Falcon (BA)	78	+ 19.136	13
11	67	(Australia) Paul Morris	Paul Morris Motorsport	Holden Commodore (VZ)	78	+ 25.395	14
12	11	(Australia) Paul Dumbrell	Perkins Engineering	Holden Commodore (VZ)	78	+ 28.531	5
13	26	(Australia) José Fernández	Britek Motorsport	Ford Falcon (BA)	78	+ 1:05.477	31
14	18	(Australia) Will Davison	Dick Johnson Racing	Ford Falcon (BA)	77	+ 1 lap	18
15	23	(Australia) Andrew Jones	Tasman Motorsport	Holden Commodore (VZ)	77	+ 1 lap	23
16	8	(Brazil) Max Wilson	WPS Racing	Ford Falcon (BA)	77	+ 1 lap	11
17	25	(Australia) Warren Luff	Britek Motorsport	Ford Falcon (BA)	77	+ 1 lap	28
18	33	(Australia) Lee Holdsworth	Garry Rogers Motorsport	Holden Commodore (VZ)	77	+ 1 lap	27
19	12	(Australia) John Bowe	Brad Jones Racing	Ford Falcon (BA)	77	+ 1 lap	19
20	34	(Australia) Dean Canto	Garry Rogers Motorsport	Holden Commodore (VZ)	77	+ 1 lap	20
21	39	(Australia) Alan Gurr	Paul Morris Motorsport	Holden Commodore (VZ)	77	+ 1 lap	25
22	5	(Australia) Mark Winterbottom	Ford Performance Racing	Ford Falcon (BA)	74	+ 4 laps	7
23	021	(New Zealand) Paul Radisich	Team Kiwi Racing	Holden Commodore (VZ)	67	+ 11 laps	9
24	20	(Australia) Marcus Marshall	Paul Cruickshank Racing	Ford Falcon (BA)	64	+ 14 laps	30
25	6	(Australia) Jason Bright	Ford Performance Racing	Ford Falcon (BA)	60	+ 18 laps	24
Ret	14	(Australia) Brad Jones	Brad Jones Racing	Ford Falcon (BA)	73	Oil leak	21
Ret	55	(Australia) Steve Owen	Rod Nash Racing	Holden Commodore (VZ)	57	Accident / Dehydration	16
Ret	10	(Australia) Jason Bargwanna	WPS Racing	Ford Falcon (BA)	50	Mechanical	28
Ret	4	(Australia) James Courtney	Stone Brothers Racing	Ford Falcon (BA)	42	Accident	8
Ret	2	(Australia) Mark Skaife	Holden Racing Team	Holden Commodore (VZ)	34	Accident	1
Ret	3	(New Zealand) Jason Richards	Tasman Motorsport	Holden Commodore (VZ)	5	Engine	4
Fastest Lap: Todd Kelly (Holden Racing Team) - 1:23.6018 on lap 5

=== Race 2 ===
Pos	No	Name	Team	Vehicle	Laps	Time	Grid
1	88	(Australia) Jamie Whincup	Triple Eight Race Engineering	Ford Falcon (BA)	78	2hr 01min 28.4014sec	3
2	22	(Australia) Todd Kelly	Holden Racing Team	Holden Commodore (VZ)	78	+ 1.926	6
3	15	(Australia) Rick Kelly	HSV Dealer Team	Holden Commodore (VZ)	78	+ 9.948	2
4	16	(Australia) Garth Tander	HSV Dealer Team	Holden Commodore (VZ)	78	+ 15.710	8
5	7	(New Zealand) Steven Richards	Perkins Engineering	Holden Commodore (VZ)	78	+ 17.635	7
6	11	(Australia) Paul Dumbrell	Perkins Engineering	Holden Commodore (VZ)	78	+ 18.801	12
7	1	(Australia) Russell Ingall	Stone Brothers Racing	Ford Falcon (BA)	78	+ 19.387	9
8	8	(Brazil) Max Wilson	WPS Racing	Ford Falcon (BA)	78	+ 20.326	16
9	17	(Australia) Steven Johnson	Dick Johnson Racing	Ford Falcon (BA)	78	+ 20.853	10
10	3	(New Zealand) Jason Richards	Tasman Motorsport	Holden Commodore (VZ)	78	+ 21.411	31
11	10	(Australia) Jason Bargwanna	WPS Racing	Ford Falcon (BA)	78	+ 23.821	28
12	021	(New Zealand) Paul Radisich	Team Kiwi Racing	Holden Commodore (VZ)	78	+ 24.714	23
13	18	(Australia) Will Davison	Dick Johnson Racing	Ford Falcon (BA)	78	+ 31.189	14
14	12	(Australia) John Bowe	Brad Jones Racing	Ford Falcon (BA)	78	+ 32.840	19
15	6	(Australia) Jason Bright	Ford Performance Racing	Ford Falcon (BA)	78	+ 50.221	25
16	25	(Australia) Warren Luff	Britek Motorsport	Ford Falcon (BA)	78	+ 51.025	17
17	67	(Australia) Paul Morris	Paul Morris Motorsport	Holden Commodore (VZ)	77	+ 1 lap	11
18	34	(Australia) Dean Canto	Garry Rogers Motorsport	Holden Commodore (VZ)	77	+ 1 lap	20
19	5	(Australia) Mark Winterbottom	Ford Performance Racing	Ford Falcon (BA)	76	+ 2 laps	22
20	14	(Australia) Brad Jones	Brad Jones Racing	Ford Falcon (BA)	75	+ 3 laps	26
21	23	(Australia) Andrew Jones	Tasman Motorsport	Holden Commodore (VZ)	75	+ 3 laps	15
22	39	(Australia) Alan Gurr	Paul Morris Motorsport	Holden Commodore (VZ)	74	+ 4 laps	21
23	33	(Australia) Lee Holdsworth	Garry Rogers Motorsport	Holden Commodore (VZ)	72	+ 6 laps	18
Ret	20	(Australia) Marcus Marshall	Paul Cruickshank Racing	Ford Falcon (BA)	72	Retired	24
Ret	51	(New Zealand) Greg Murphy	Paul Weel Racing	Holden Commodore (VZ)	56	Accident	5
Ret	2	(Australia) Mark Skaife	Holden Racing Team	Holden Commodore (VZ)	56	Accident	30
Ret	4	(Australia) James Courtney	Stone Brothers Racing	Ford Falcon (BA)	50	Collision	29
Ret	50	(Australia) Cameron McConville	Paul Weel Racing	Holden Commodore (VZ)	50	Collision	4
Ret	888	(Australia) Craig Lowndes	Triple Eight Race Engineering	Ford Falcon (BA)	50	Collision	1
EXC	26	(Australia) José Fernández	Britek Motorsport	Ford Falcon (BA)		Disqualified	
Fastest Lap: Jason Richards (Tasman Motorsport) - 1:22.8244 on lap 11
