= Holden Commodore =

Car model from Holden

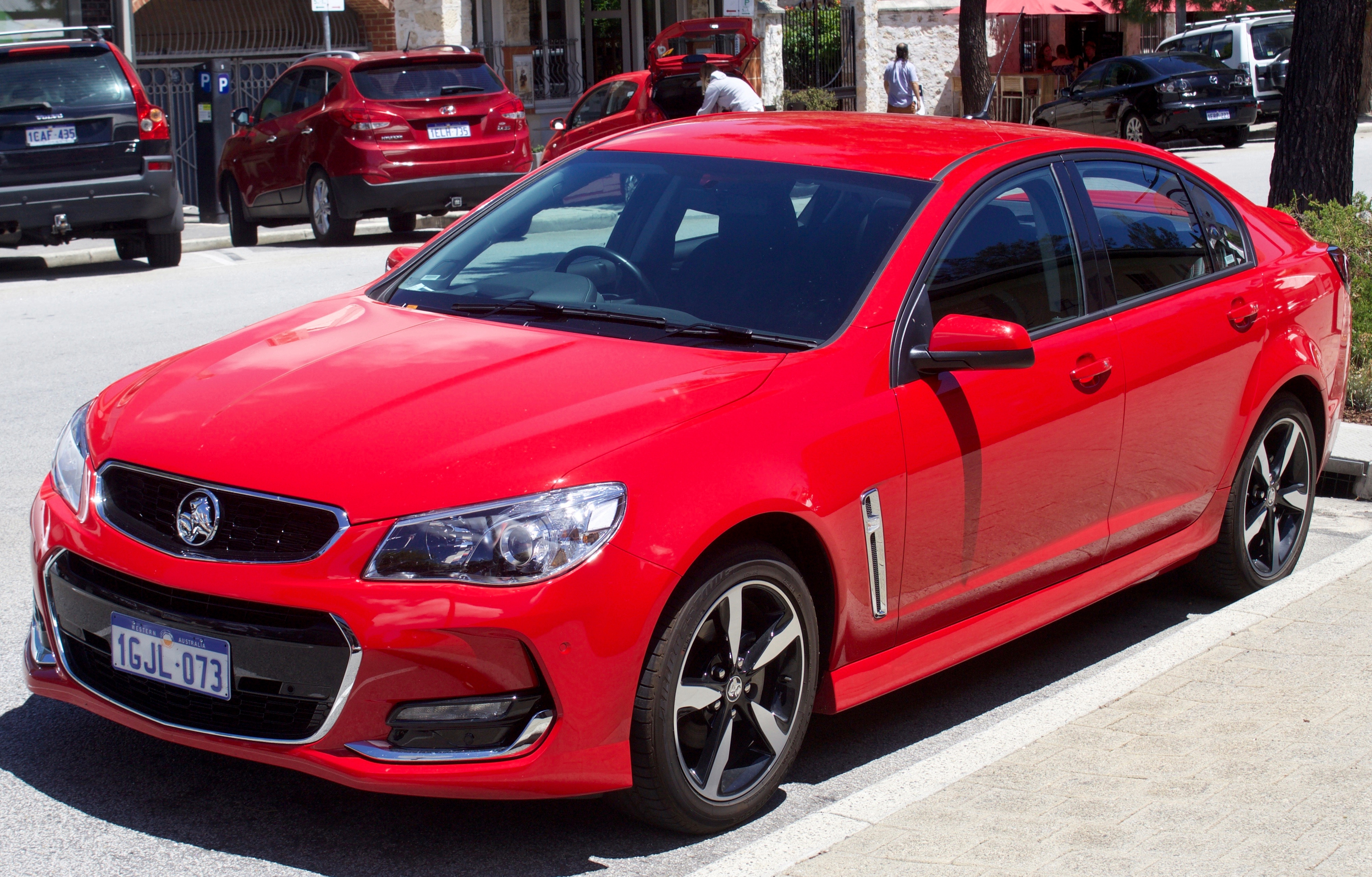
- 2017 Holden Commodore SV6 sedan (VFII)

Overview
- Manufacturer: Holden
- Production: October 1978 – October 2017 (Australia); February 2018 – December 2020 (Germany)

Body and chassis
- Class: Mid-size car (1978–1988; 2018–2020); Full-size car (1988–2017)
- Body style: 2-door coupé utility; 4-door sedan; 5-door station wagon; 4-door crew cab; 2-door cab chassis
- Layout: Front-engine, rear-wheel drive (1978–2017); Front-engine, front-wheel drive (2018–2020); Front-engine, all-wheel drive (2018–2020)
- Platform: GM V platform (1978–2006); GM Zeta platform (2006–2017); GM E2XX platform (2018–2020)
- Related: Holden Caprice; Holden Statesman; Holden Monaro; Opel Insignia; Opel Commodore; Buick Regal; Opel Omega; Pontiac G8; Vauxhall Carlton; Chevrolet SS; Vauxhall Insignia

Chronology
- Predecessor: Holden Kingswood

The Holden Commodore is a series of automobiles that were sold by now-defunct Australian manufacturer Holden from 1978 until 2020. They were manufactured from 1978 to 2017 in Australia and from 1979 to 1990 in New Zealand, with production of the locally manufactured versions in Australia ending on 20 October 2017.

The first three generations of Holden produced Commodores (1978–2006) were based on the Opel designed V-body rear-wheel drive automotive platform, which was the basis of GM's largest European models, but was heavily re-engineered by Holden: structurally strengthened, mechanically modified, and, in time, enlarged for Australian road conditions, production needs, and market demands respectively. The styling of these cars was broadly similar to that of the Opel Rekord E/Commodore C, and later, the Opel Omega A/B and their Vauxhall sister models the Vauxhall Carlton and Omega.

The fourth generation Holden Commodore models, the last models produced by Holden in Australia (2006 until 2017), the VE and VF, were entirely designed in-house and based on the Holden-developed, rear-wheel drive Zeta platform.

For its fifth generation Commodore model, the German produced ZB, Holden returned to re-engineering an Opel vehicle which was sold in Australia from 2018 to 2020, following the closure of Holden's own factories. The Opel produced ZB was based on the Opel Insignia, but with significant modifications by Holden engineers to its chassis, steering, suspension, driving dynamics, exhaust, sound symposer and engines. After poor sales, the imported ZB Commodore was terminated abruptly at the end of 2020, along with the discontinuation of Holden as a subsidiary company, marque, and nameplate.

== History ==
The Commodore replaced the long-serving Holden Kingswood and Holden Premier. Initially introduced as a single sedan body style, the range expanded in 1979 to include a station wagon. From 1984, Holden began branding the flagship model as Holden Calais, with the Commodore Berlina introduced in 1984 gaining independent Holden Berlina nomenclature in 1988. Long-wheelbase Statesman/Caprice derivatives and the Holden Utility (coupé utility) variant followed in 1990. The third generation architecture spawned the most body styles, with a new Holden Ute launched in 2000, reborn Monaro coupé in 2001, four-door Holden Crewman utility and all-wheel drive (AWD) Holden Adventra crossover in 2003. Holden Special Vehicles (HSV) in 1987 began official modification of high performance variants of the Commodore and its derivatives, under its own nameplate.

Rivalry came predominantly from the Ford Falcon—also locally built. Prior to the second generation Commodore of 1988, the Holden was positioned a full class below the full-size Falcon. To varying degrees, competition also came from mid-size offerings from Toyota Australia as well as Chrysler Australia, which morphed into Mitsubishi Motors Australia. Moreover, between 1989 and 1997, Australian federal government policy saw the launch of the Toyota Lexcen, which was a rebadged version of the second generation Commodore. With the introduction of the third generation in 1997, Holden implemented its largest export programs involving Commodore and its derivatives. In the Middle East and South Africa the Commodore sold as a Chevrolet. High-performance export versions followed in North America, sold as Pontiac and later Chevrolet. HSV also exported to the United Kingdom as Vauxhall, in the Middle East as Chevrolet Special Vehicles (CSV) and in New Zealand and Singapore as HSV.

In December 2013, Holden announced that it would cease its local production by the end of October 2017 committing, however, to use the long-standing Commodore nameplate on its fifth-generation fully imported replacement, moving to a front-wheel drive (FWD)/all-wheel drive (AWD) platform.

On 10 December 2019, Holden announced that the Commodore nameplate would be discontinued in 2020, in what is, according to Holden's interim chairman and managing director Kristian Aquilina, "decisive action to ensure a sharp focus on the largest and most buoyant market segments", focusing on their SUV and Ute range, which had accounted for over 76% of their lineup during 2019. This marks the end of the Commodore nameplate's 41 years. On 17 February 2020, General Motors announced that the Holden marque in its entirety would be retired from sale in Australia and New Zealand by 2021.

== First generation (1978–1988) ==
=== VB (1978–1980) ===
Introduced in October 1978, the VB Commodore development covered a period with the effects of the 1973 oil crisis still being felt. Hence, when Holden decided to replace the successful full-size HZ Kingswood with a new model line, they wanted the new car to be smaller and more fuel efficient. Originally, Holden looked at developing a new WA Kingswood, but that project was abandoned. With no replacement in development, Holden looked to Opel to provide the design foundations of the VB, basing it on the four-cylinder Rekord E body shell, with the front grafted on from the Opel Senator A, both constructed using GM's V-body platform. This change was necessitated to accommodate the larger Holden six- and eight-cylinder engines. Holden also adopted the name "Commodore" from Opel, which had been using the name since 1967. Opel went on to use Holden's Rekord-Senator hybrid as a foundation for its new generation Commodore C, slotting in between the two donor models.

During the VB's development, Holden realised that when driven at speed over harsh Australian roads, the Opel Rekord would effectively break apart at the firewall. This forced Holden to re-engineer the entire car for the often harsh Australian road conditions, resulting in only 35 percent commonality with the Rekord. Among other changes, the Rekord's MacPherson strut front suspension was modified, and the recirculating ball steering was replaced with a rack and pinion type. These and other mechanical and structural modifications massively blew out development costs to a reported A$110 million—a figure then close to the cost of developing an all-new model independently. With such a large sum consumed by the VB development programme, Holden was left with insufficient finances for the development of a station wagon variant. Added that the Commodore architecture was considered an unsuitable base for utility and long-wheelbase models, Holden was left with only a sedan, albeit one in three levels of luxury: a base, SL, and SL/E. Desperate measures forced Holden to shape the Commodore front-end to the rear of the Rekord wagon. As the wagon-specific sheet metal had to be imported from Germany, the wagon, introduced in July 1979, suffered from inevitable component differences from the sedan. Although infrequently criticised in the early years, quality problems were evident, with poor trim and panel fit problematic for all first generation Commodores. This coupled with mechanical dilemmas such as water pump failure and steering rack rattle ensured warranty claims were high in the first year. Despite these issues, the VB Commodore was widely praised for its value for money sophistication, especially in regards to its steering, handling, braking, and ride quality. thus securing the Wheels Car of the Year award for 1978.

The VB series retained 96 percent of the preceding HZ Kingswood's interior space but was only 86 percent the HZ's external size, although five percent larger than the Torana. With the Commodore dropping a full class below the Kingswood and its Ford Falcon competitor, the smaller Commodore was predictably more fuel-efficient. This downsizing was first seen as a major disadvantage for Holden, as they had effectively relinquished the potential of selling Commodores to the fleet and taxi industries. These sales losses were thought to be unrecoverable; however, the 1979 energy crisis saw Australian oil prices rise by 140 percent, putting substantial strain on the automotive industry to collectively downsize, a change that Holden had already done.

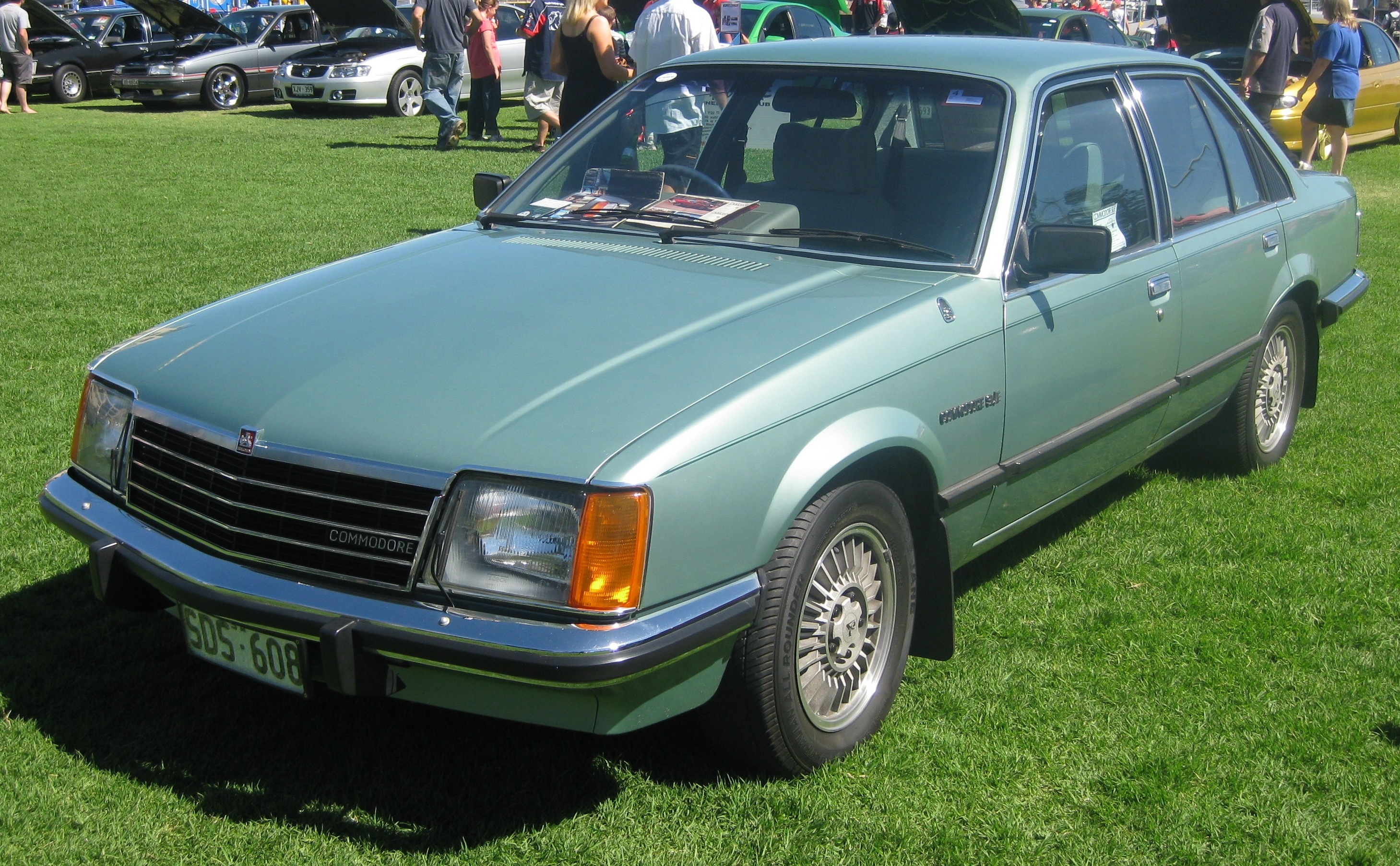
Sedan (SL E)

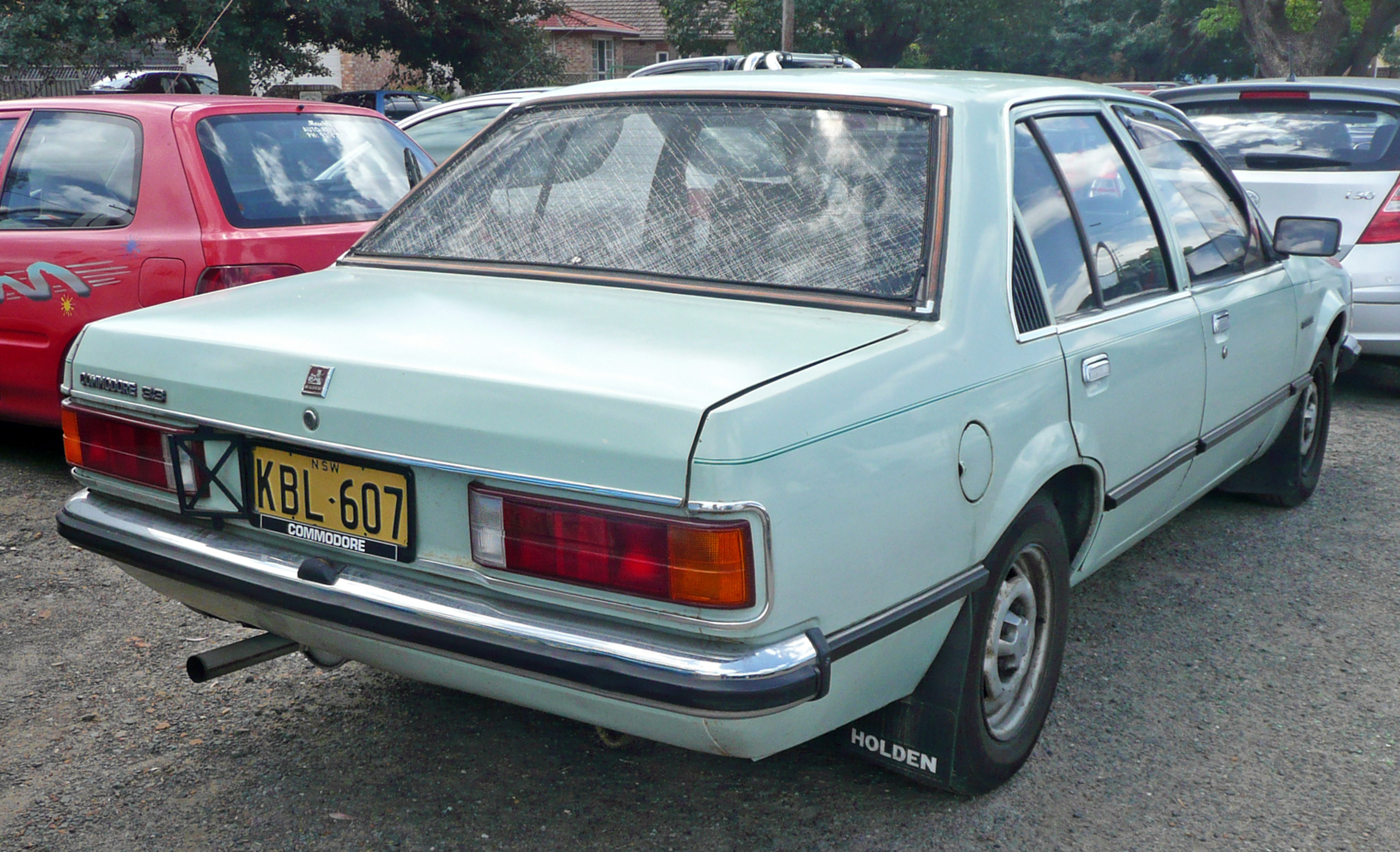
Sedan (base)

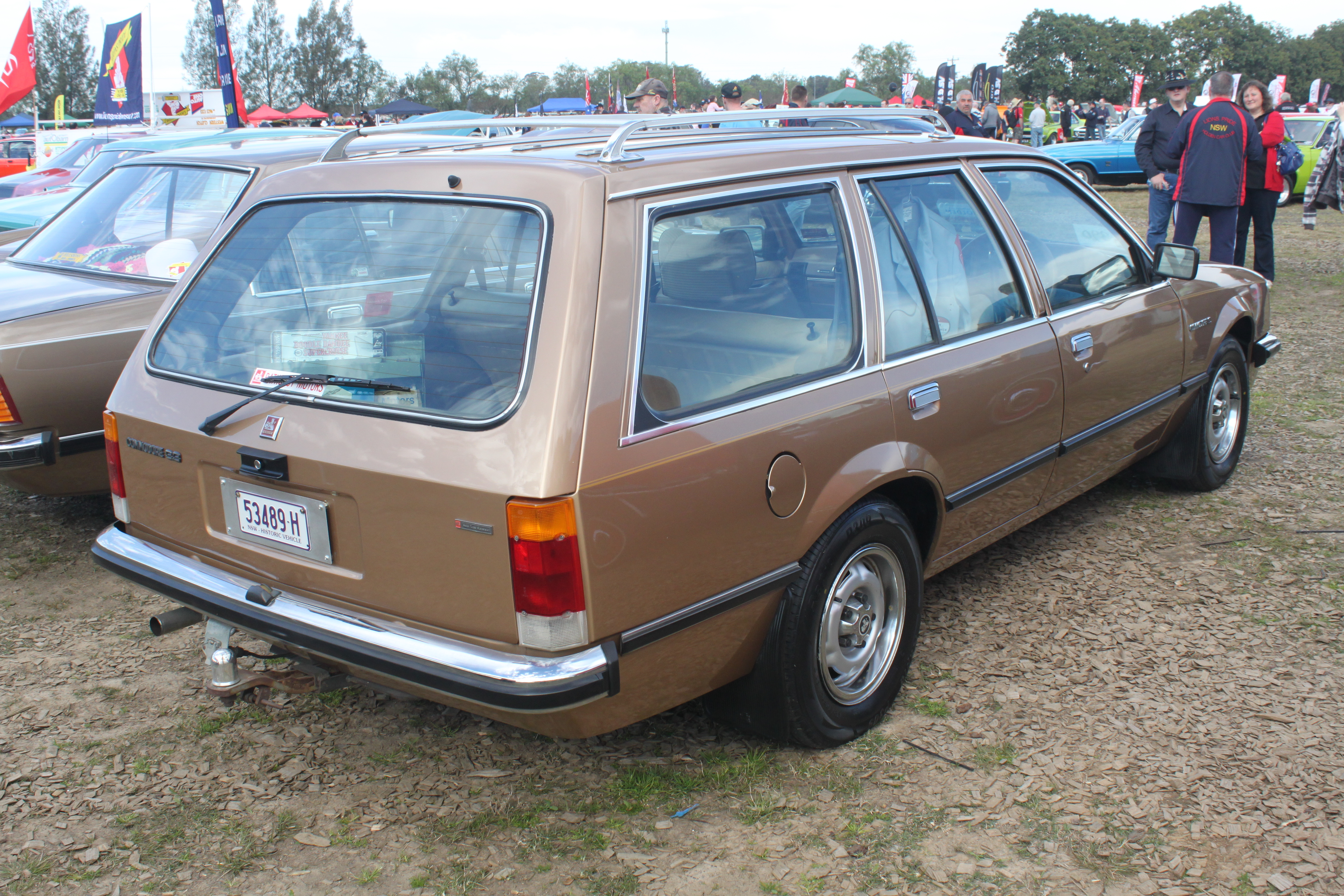
Wagon (SL)

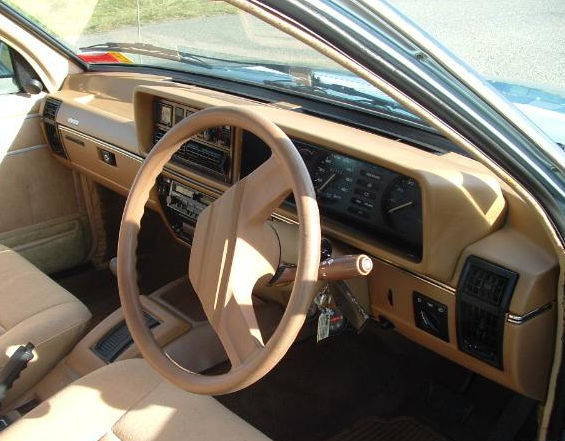
Interior

=== VC (1980–1981) ===
The most significant change to the VC Commodore of March 1980 was the engine upgrading to "XT5" specification. Now painted blue and thus known as the Blue straight-sixes and Holden V8s, these replaced the Red units fitted to the VB and earlier cars. Changes included a new twelve-port cylinder head, redesigned combustion chambers, inlet and exhaust manifolds, a new two-barrel carburettor . Tweaks and changes to the V8s surrounded the implementation of electronic ignition, revised cylinder head and inlet manifold design and the fitment of a four-barrel carburettor on the 4.2-litre variant. These changes brought improved efficiency, increased outputs and aided driveability. In response to increasing oil prices, a four-cylinder variant was spawned in June 1980. Displacing 1.9-litres, this powerplant known as Starfire was effectively Holden's existing straight-six with two cylinders removed. The four's peak power output of 58 kW (78 hp) and torque rated at 140 N⋅m (103 ft⋅lbf) meant its performance was compromised. Reports indicate that the need to push the engine hard to extract performance led to real-world fuel consumption similar to the straight-sixes.

Holden's emphasis on fuel economy extended beyond powertrains, with a fuel consumption vacuum gauge replacing the tachometer throughout the range, although this could be optioned back with the sports instrumentation package. Visual changes were limited: the relocation of the corporate crest to the centre of the redesigned grille, black-coloured trim applied to the tail lamp surrounds on sedans, and the embossment of model badging into the side rubbing strips. The previously undesignated base car, was now the Commodore L, opening up the range for a new unbadged sub-level car. This delete option model, was de-specified and available only to fleet customers. On the premium Commodore SL/E, a resurrected "Shadowtone" exterior paint option became available in a limited range of dark-over-light colour combinations. According to contemporary reviews, changes made to the VC's steering produced a heavier feel and inclined understeer, while the revised suspension gave a softer ride and addressed concerns raised while riding fully laden.

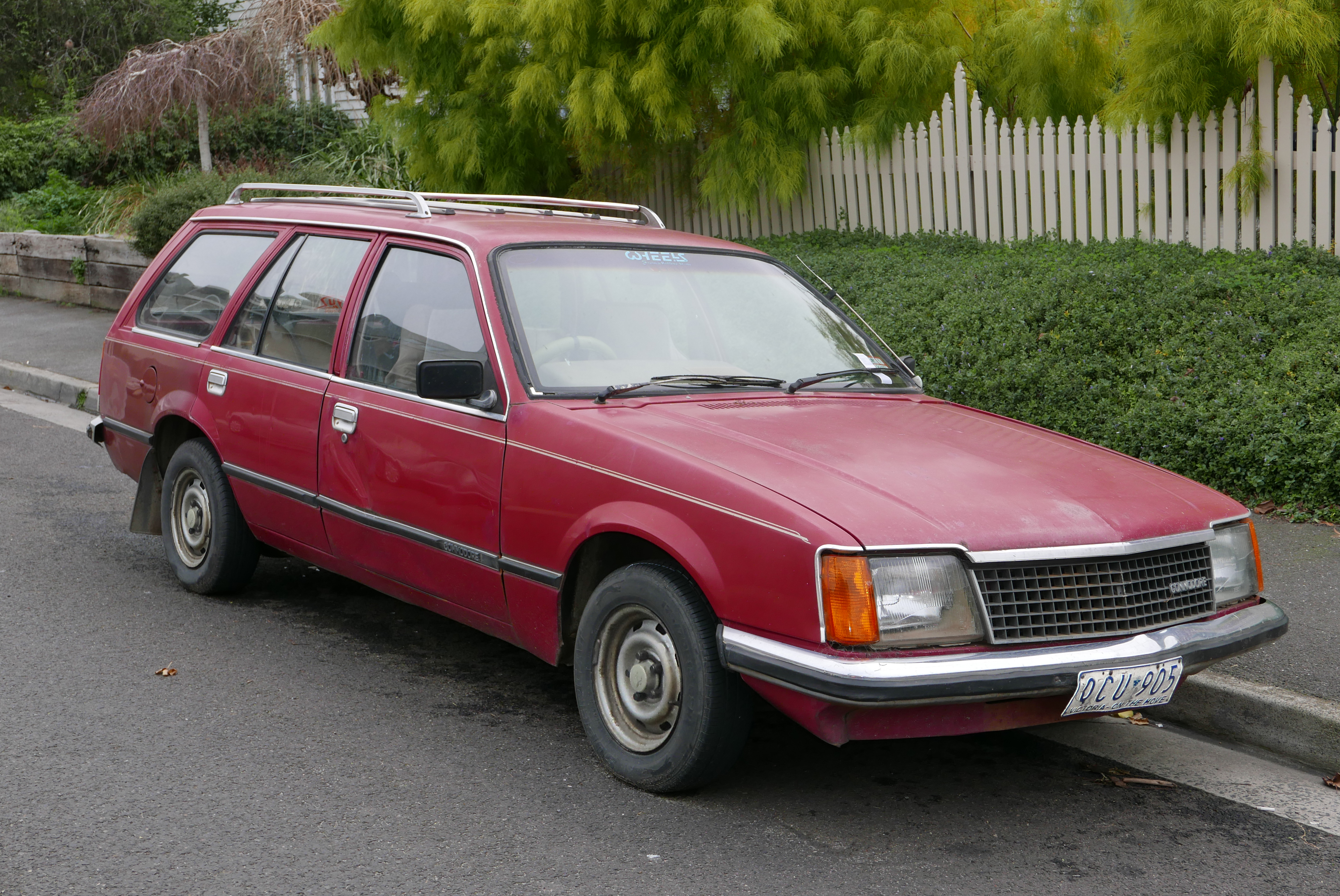
Station wagon (L)

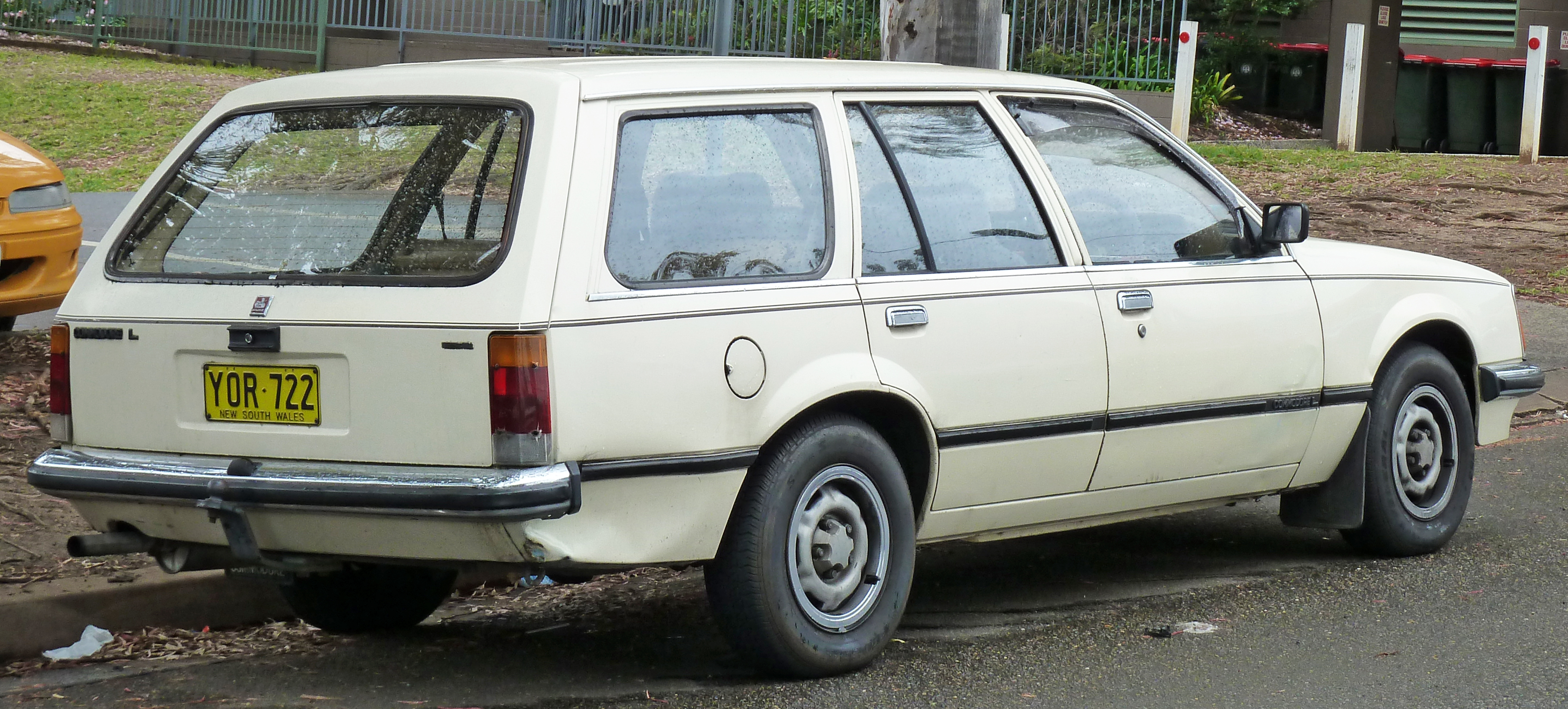
Station wagon (L)

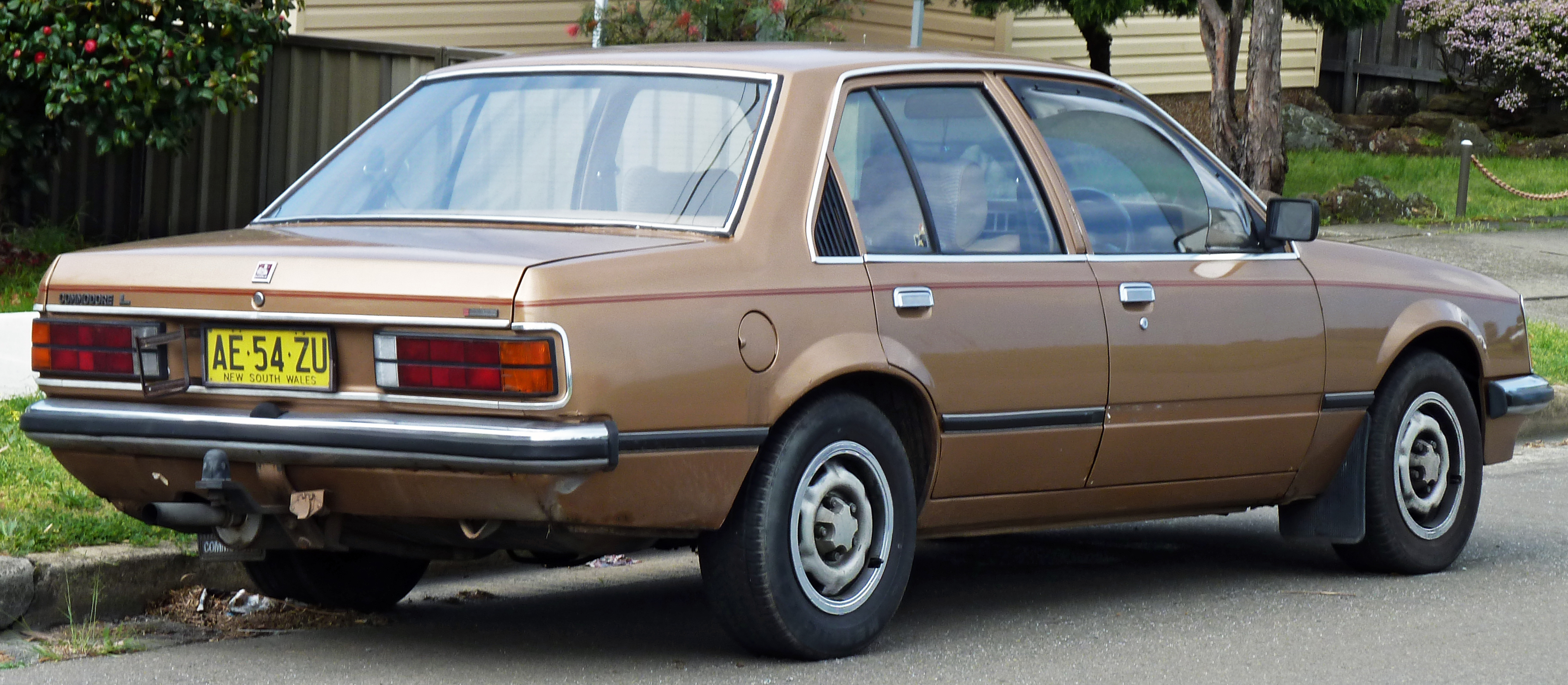
Sedan (L)

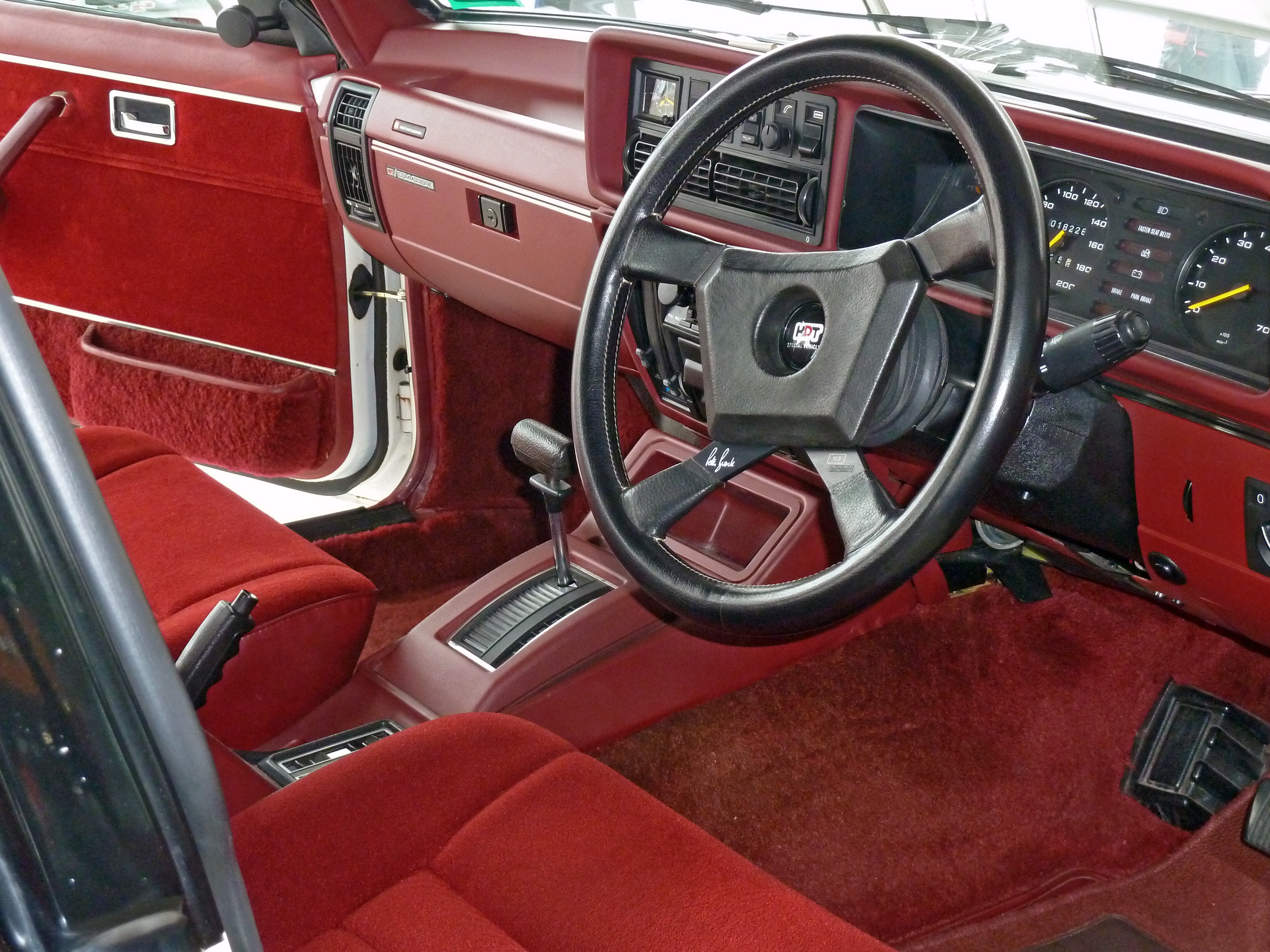
Interior

=== VH (1981–1984) ===
The VH series Commodore introduced in September 1981 brought moderately updated frontal bodywork, with a new bonnet and front guards to facilitate the reshaped headlamps and a horizontally slatted grille. These front-end design changes worked to produce a longer, yet wider look. At the rear, sedans featured redesigned tail light clusters, the design of which borrowed from Mercedes-Benz models of the day, using a louvered design. At the same time, the nomenclature of the range was rationalised. The SL superseded the L as the base model, with the old SL level becoming the mid-range SL/X, and the SL/E remaining as the top-of-the-line variant. Wagons were restricted to the SL and SL/X trims. Redesigned pentagonal alloy wheels—replacing the original SL/E type used since 1978—along with a black painted B-pillar, wraparound chrome rear bumper extensions to the wheel arches, and extended tail lamps that converged with the license plate alcove—distinguished the range-topping SL/E from other variants. The new pentagonal wheels were initially in short supply, such that only Shadowtone option SL/E sedans received them during 1981 production.

Mechanical specifications carried over, except for a new five-speed manual transmission, optional on the 1.9-litre four-cylinder and 2.85-litre six-cylinder versions. In an attempt to improve sales figures of the straight-four engine, Holden spent considerable time improving its performance and efficiency. Modifications were also made to the 2.85-litre six to lift economy, and the powerplants managed to reduce fuel consumption by as much as 12.5 and 14 percent, correspondingly. Holden released the sports-oriented Commodore SS sedan in September 1982—reintroducing a nameplate used briefly ten years prior with the HQ series. Provisioned with a choice of 4.2- or optional 5.0-litre V8 engines, both versions of the VH SS were teamed with a four-speed manual transmission. Racing driver Peter Brock's Holden Dealer Team (HDT) high performance outfit produced three upgraded versions, known as Group One, Group Two and Group Three, the latter version available in either 4.2-litre or more commonly 5.0-litre V8 configuration.

By the time of the VH series, Commodore sales were beginning to decline. Holden's six-cylinder engine, which was carried over from the Kingswood, could trace its roots back to 1963 and was no longer competitive. Continual improvements made to Commodore's Ford Falcon rival meant the VH was not significantly more fuel-efficient or better performing despite the smaller size. This was curtailed by the absence of any major powertrain revisions by the time of the VH and the lack of visual departure from the original VB. Holden also had to deal with the influx of their own mid-size Camira from 1982, which presented comparable interior volume with lower fuel consumption, and for less than the Commodore pricing point. Camira sales were strong initially, but as fuel prices had stabilised, buyers gravitated away from Camira and Commodore towards the larger Falcon, which overtook the Commodore as Australia's bestselling car for the first time in 1982.

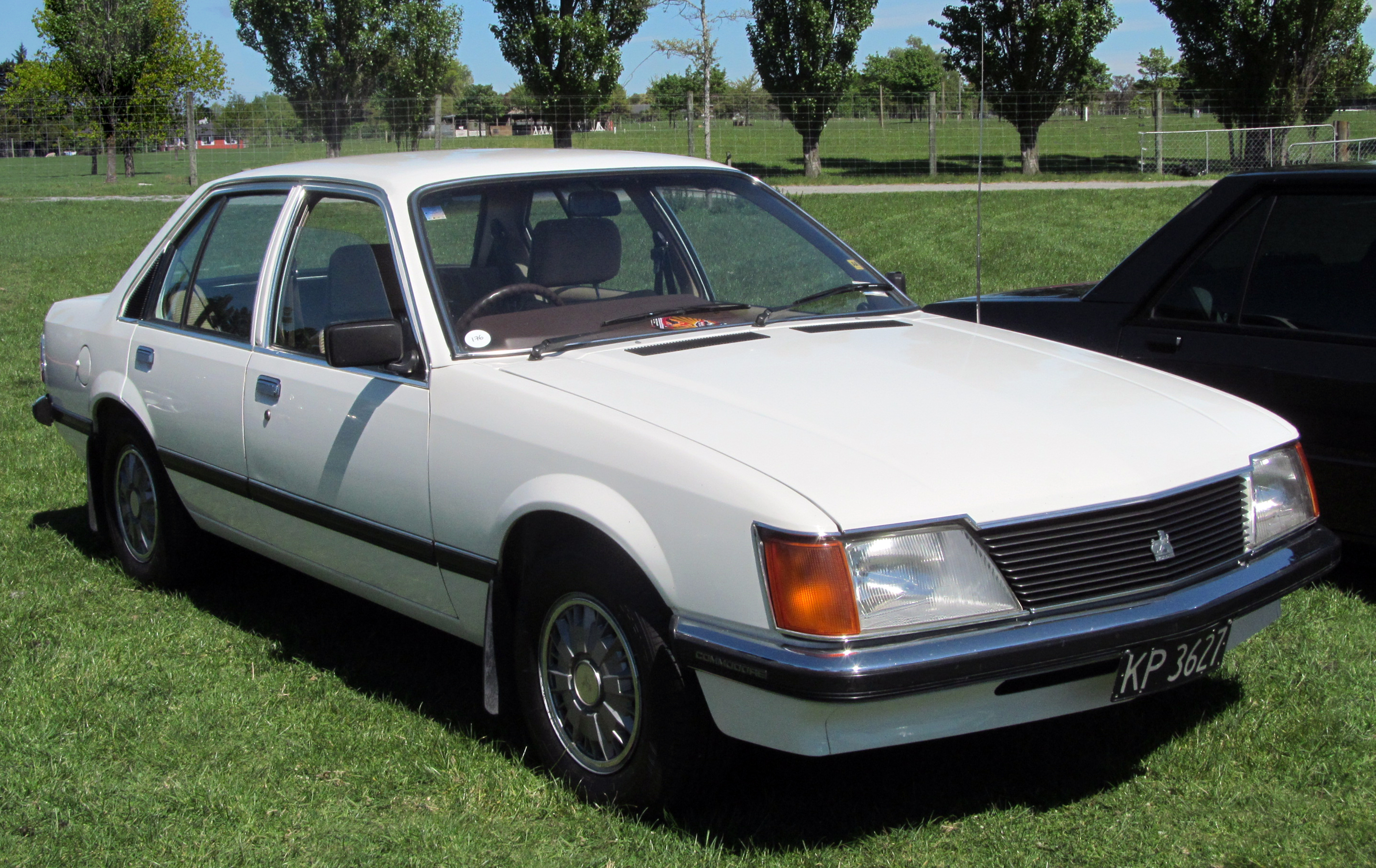
Sedan (base)

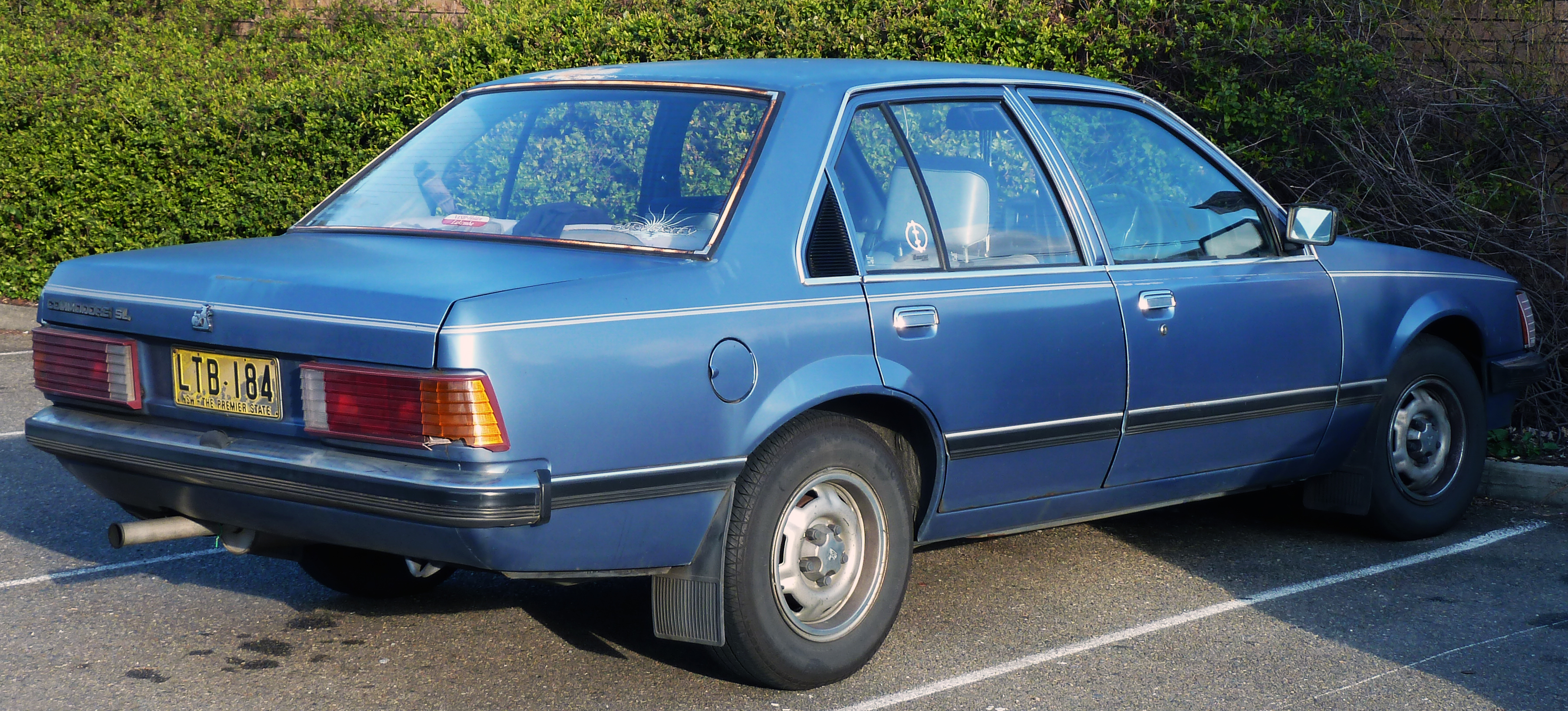
Sedan (SL)

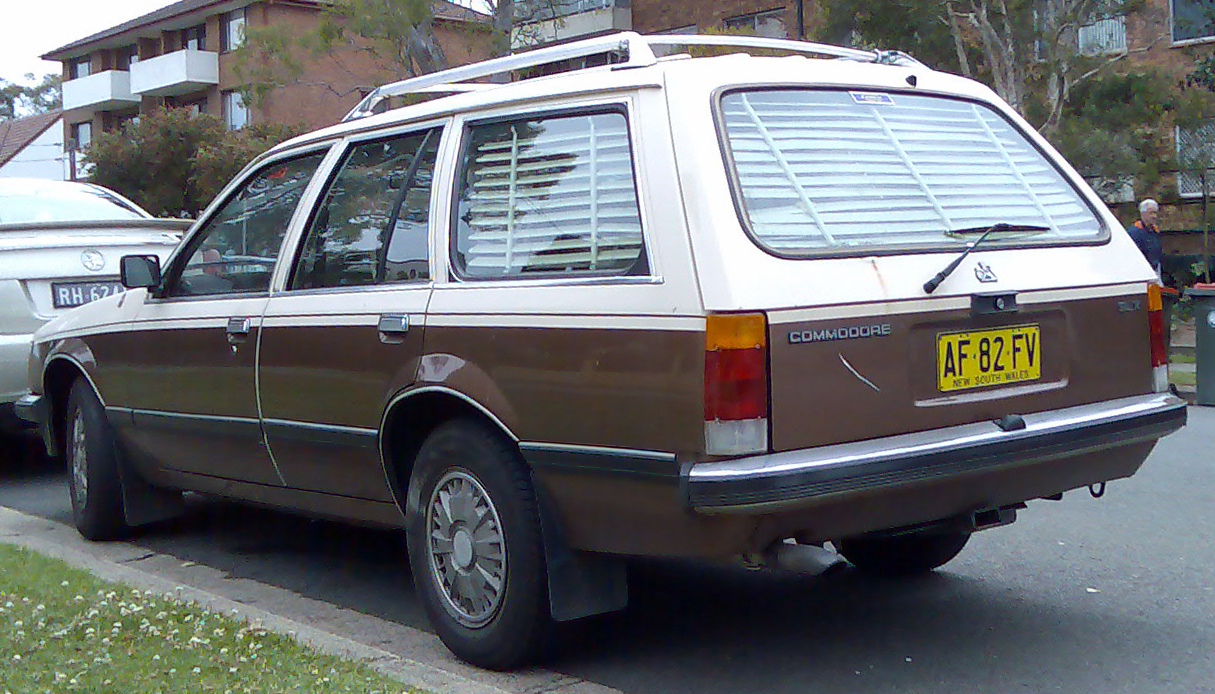
Station wagon (SLX)

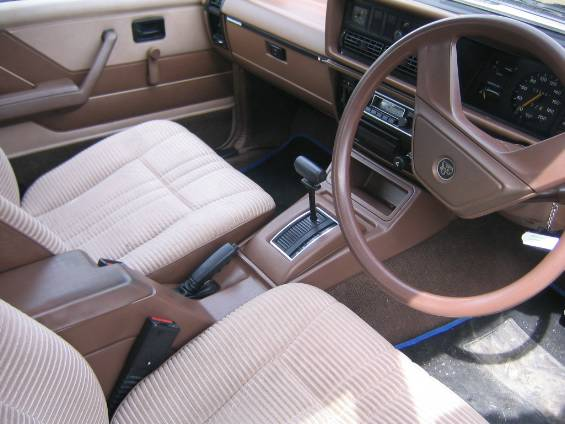
Interior

=== VK (1984–1986) ===
Representing the first major change since the VB original, the VK model of 1984 introduced a six-window glasshouse, as opposed to the previous four-window design, to make the Commodore appear larger. The revised design helped stimulate sales, which totalled 135,000 in two years. This did not put an end to Holden's monetary woes. Sales of the initially popular Camira slumped due to unforeseen quality issues, while the Holden WB series commercial vehicle range and the Statesman WB luxury models were starting to show their age; their 1971 origins compared unfavourably with Ford's more modern Falcon and Fairlane models.

New names for the trim levels were also introduced, such as Commodore Executive (an SL with air conditioning and automatic transmission), Commodore Berlina (replacing SL/X) and Calais (replacing SL/E). The 3.3-litre Blue straight-six engine was replaced by the Black specification, gaining computer-controlled ignition systems on the carburettor versions and optional electronic fuel injection boosting power output to 106 kW (142 hp). The 5.0-litre V8 engine continued to power high specification variants, but was shrunk from 5,044 cc to 4,987 cc in 1985 due to new Group A racing homologation rules. The new car cut its predecessor's weight by 75 kg (165 lb) and models were fitted with an upgraded braking system. As high oil prices became a thing of the past, Holden decided to drop the 2.85- six and 4.2-litre V8, while the 1.9-litre four-cylinder was limited to New Zealand.

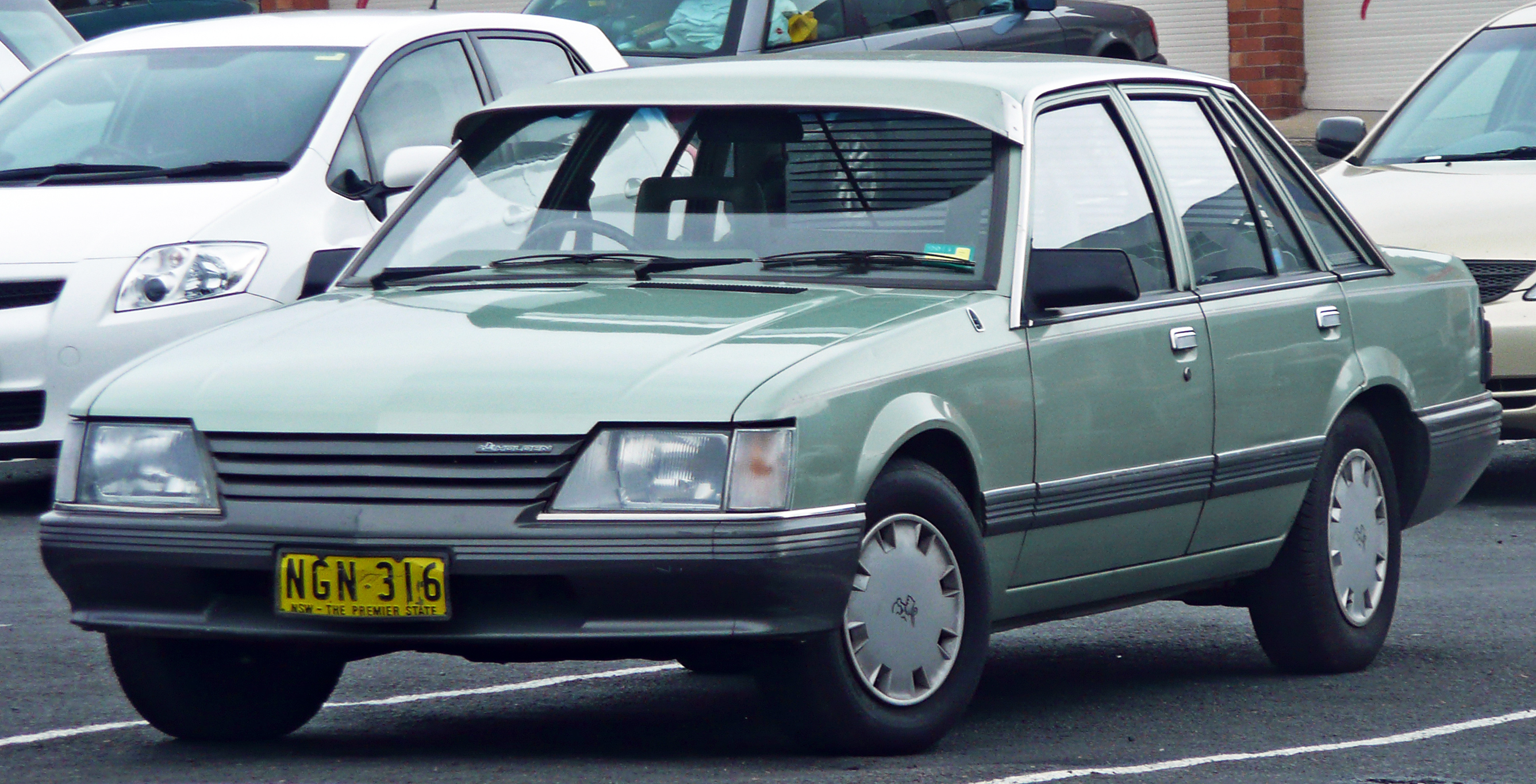
Sedan (SL)

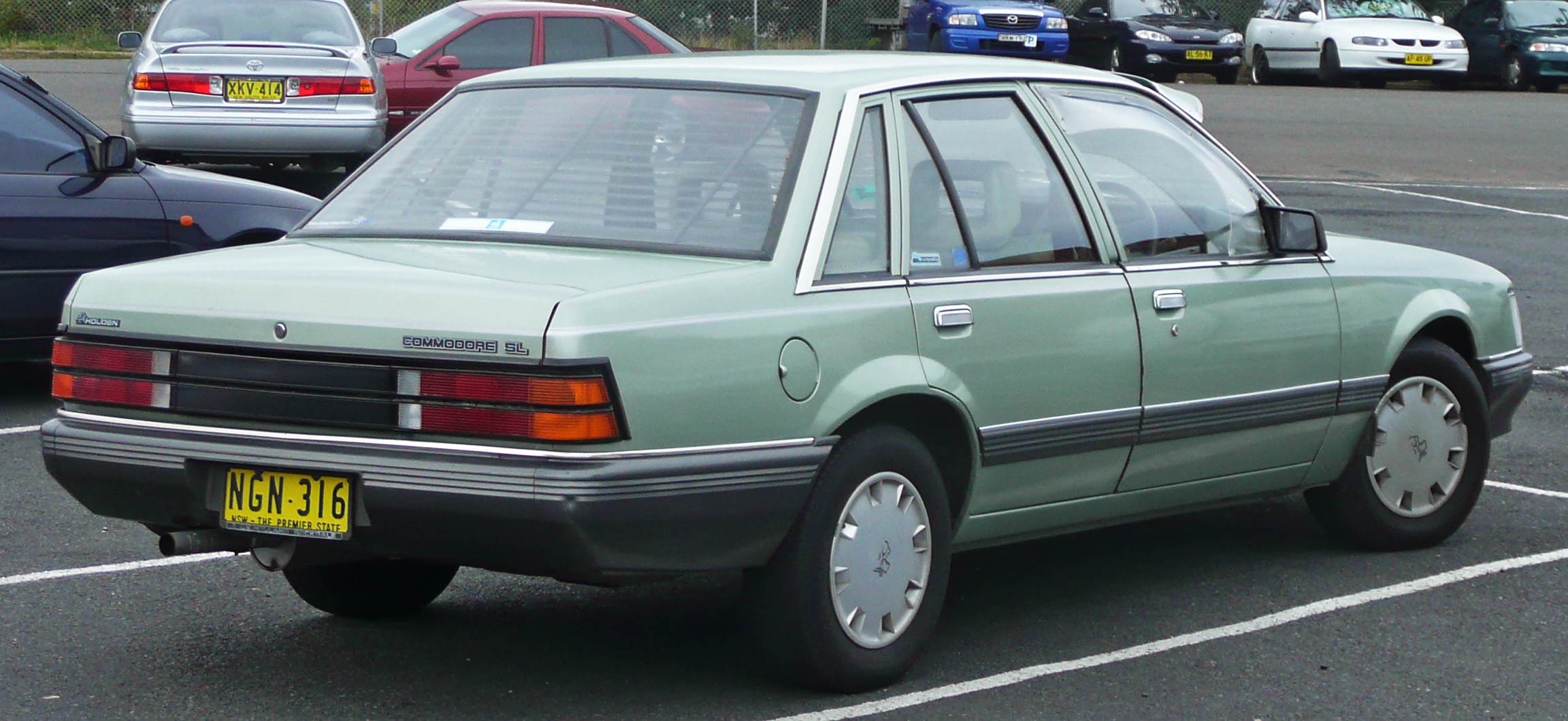
Sedan (SL)

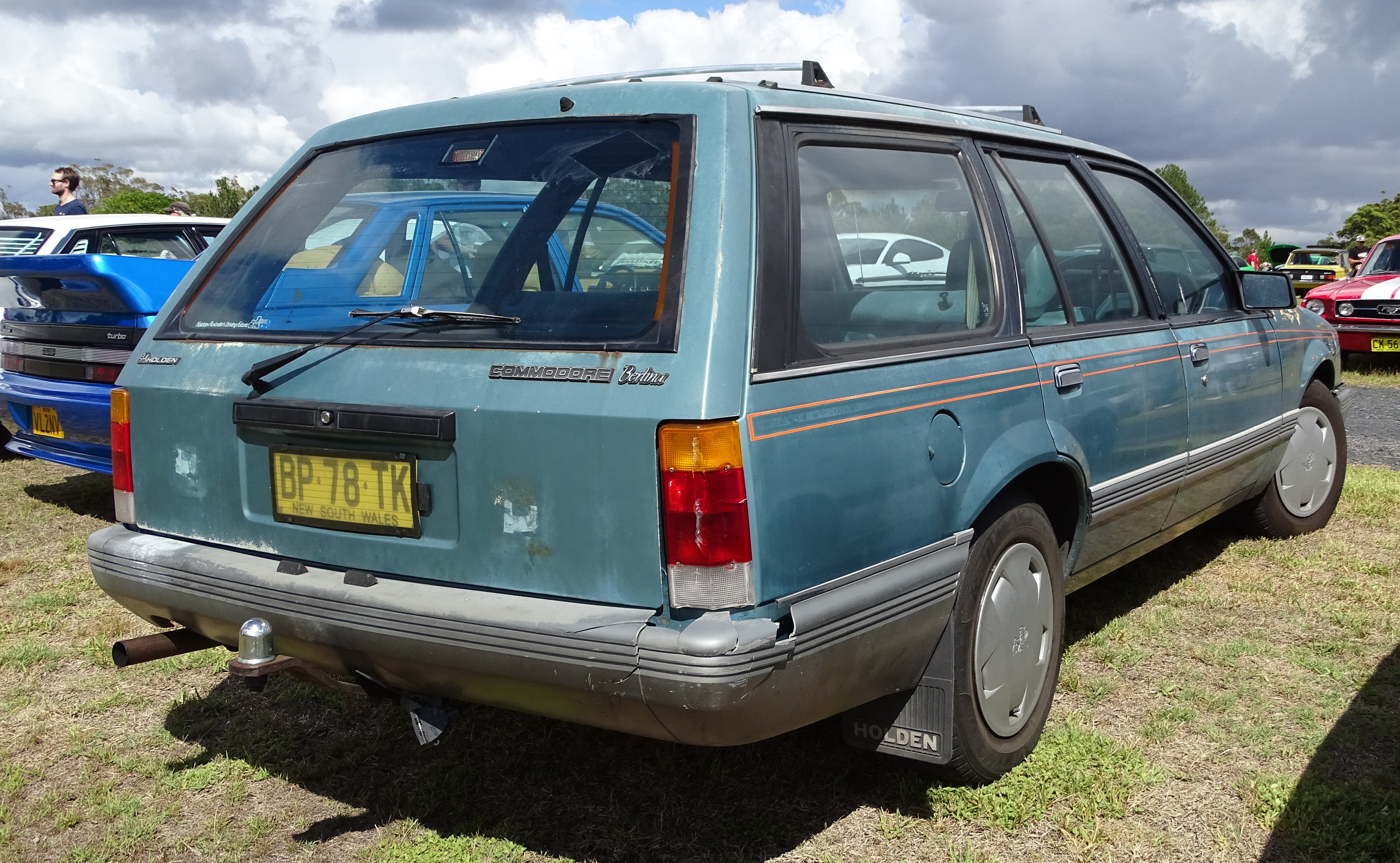
Station wagon (Berlina)

=== VL (1986–1988) ===
Marking a high point in terms of sales, the last-of-the-series VL Commodore sold in record numbers, finally managing to outsell the Ford Falcon in the private sector. The 1986 VL represented a substantial makeover of the VK and would be the last of the mid-size Commodores for 30 years. Designers distanced the Commodore further away from its Opel origins, by smoothing the lines of the outer body and incorporating a subtle tail spoiler. A thorough redesign of the nose saw the Commodore gain sleek, narrow headlamps and a shallower grille, while the Calais specification employed unique partially concealed headlamps.

By this stage, Holden's 24‑year‑old six-cylinder was thoroughly outmoded and would have been difficult to re-engineer to comply with pending emission standards and the introduction of unleaded fuel. This led Holden to sign a deal with Nissan of Japan to import their RB30E engine. This seemed a good idea in 1983 when the Australian dollar was strong; however by 1986 the once viable prospect became rather expensive. The public quickly accepted what was at first a controversial move, as reports emerged of the improvements in refinement, 33 percent gain in power and 15 percent better economy over the carburettor version of the VK's Black straight-six. An optional turbocharger appeared six months later and lifted power output to 150 kW (201 hp). In October 1986, an unleaded edition of Holden's carburettored V8 engine was publicised. Holden had originally planned to discontinue the V8 to spare the engineering expense of converting to unleaded. However, public outcry persuaded them to relent. VLs in New Zealand, Indonesia, Singapore and Thailand were also available with the 2.0-litre six-cylinder RB20E engine.

The VL suffered from some common build quality problems, such as poor windshield sealing, that can lead to water leakages and corrosion. Awkward packaging under the low bonnet coupled with Holden's decision to utilise a cross-flow radiator (as opposed to the up-down flow radiator installed to the equivalent Nissan Skyline) meant the six-cylinder engine was especially susceptible to cracked cylinder heads, a problem not displayed on the Nissan Skyline with which it shares the RB30E engine. The Used Car Safety Ratings, published in 2008 by the Monash University Accident Research Centre, found that first generation Commodores (VB–VL), similarly to the Ford Falcons manufactured during the same years, provide a "worse than average" level of occupant safety protection in the event of an accident. It is perhaps noteworthy however, that the Monash University publication includes in its averages, vehicles manufactured as late as 2006. As such, and with reasonable necessity, the 2008 Used Car Safety Ratings include comparison of some non-airbag vehicles with later vehicles fitted with airbags. In 1988, it would still be some years before airbags became available to the public on vehicles manufactured in Australia, and, outside of the very high end luxury market, available in Australia at all. As airbag technology later become more available, the Holden Commodore would become one of the first to offer the option (see VR Commodore below).

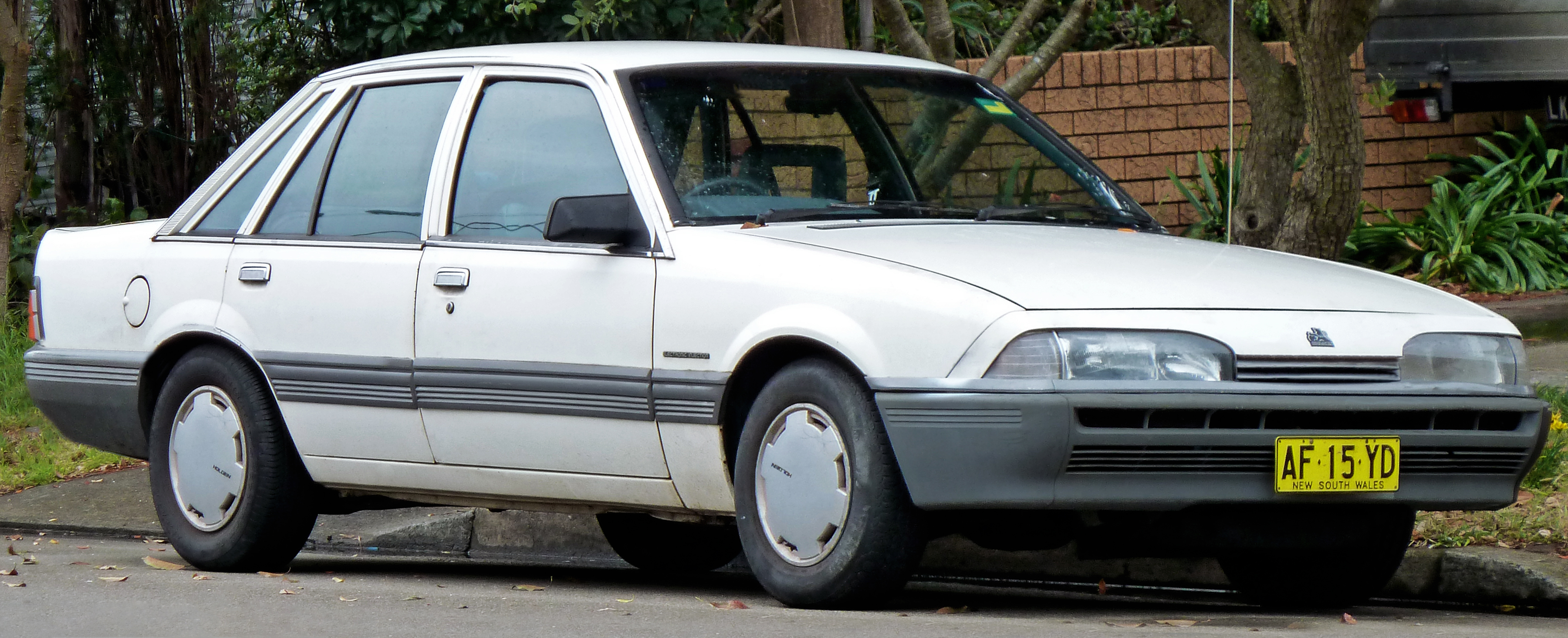
Sedan (Executive)

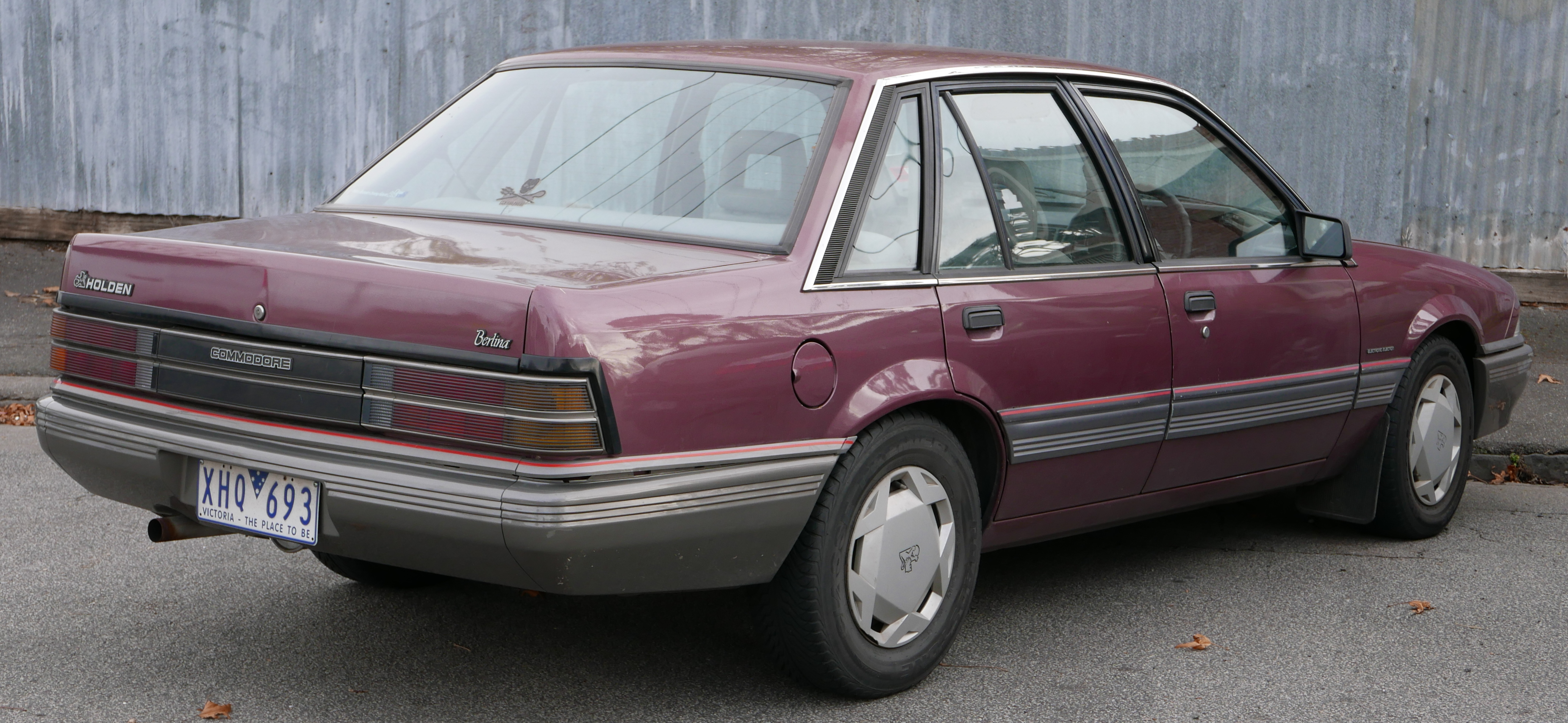
Sedan (Berlina)

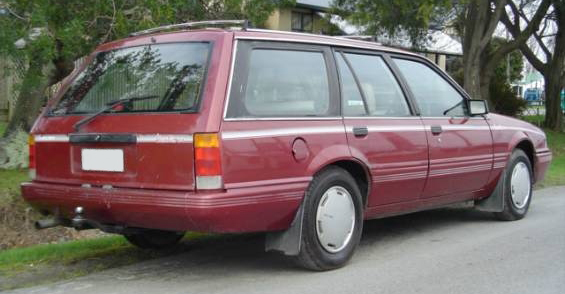
Station Wagon (Vacationer)

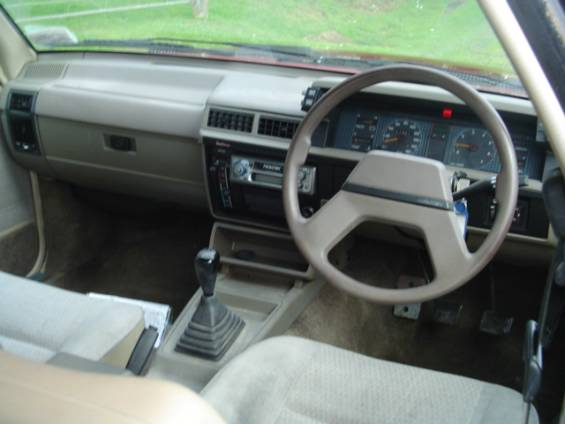
Interior

== Second generation (1988–1997) ==
=== VN (1988–1991) ===
The VN Commodore of 1988 and subsequent second generation models took their bodywork from the larger Opel Senator B and new Opel Omega A. However, this time, the floor plan was widened and stretched; now matching the rival Ford Falcon for size. Continuing financial woes at Holden meant the wider VN body was underpinned by narrow, carry-over VL chassis components in a bid to save development costs. In Australia, for the VN and succeeding models, the Commodore Berlina became known simply as the Berlina (but in New Zealand the V6 VN Berlina, assembled locally until the Trentham factory was closed in 1990, was badged Executive. The Berlina nameplate was not launched, as a new entry level grade, with trim and equipment equivalent to the Australian V6 Executive, until the locally built four cylinder model, using the Australian-made, Opel designed, two-litre Family Two fuel injected engine, was added some months after the V6s). The range expanded in 1990 to include a Utility, given the model designation VG. This was built on a longer-wheelbase platform that it shared with the station wagon and luxury VQ Statesman sedans released earlier in the year. During this time, the rival Ford EA Falcon was plagued with initial quality issues which tarnished its reputation. Buyers embraced the VN Commodore, helping Holden to recover and post an operating profit of A$157.3 million for 1989. The team at Wheels magazine awarded the VN Car of the Year in 1988: the second Commodore model to receive this award.

Changes in the relative values of the Australian dollar and Japanese yen made it financially impractical to continue with the well-regarded Nissan engine of the VL. Instead, Holden manufactured their own 3.8-litre V6 engine based on a Buick design, adapted from FWD to RWD. The 5.0-litre V8 remained optional and received a power boost to 165 kW (221 hp) courtesy of multi-point fuel injection. Although not known for its refinement, the new V6 was nevertheless praised for its performance and fuel efficiency at the time. The 2.0-litre Family II engine offered in New Zealand was also offered in some other export markets including Singapore where the model also was badged Berlina. Accompanying the changes to engines, the VL's four-speed automatic transmission was replaced by the Turbo-Hydramatic and a Borg-Warner five-speed manual. A Series II update of the VN appeared in September 1989, featuring a revised V6 engine known internally as the EV6. With the update came a power hike of rising to 127 kW (170 hp) from 125 kW (168 hp).

Under an unsuccessful model sharing arrangement that was part of the Hawke Government reforms in 1989, which saw the formation of the United Australian Automobile Industries alliance between Holden and Toyota Australia, the latter began selling badge engineered versions of the VN Commodore manufactured by Holden. The rebadged Commodores were sold as the Toyota Lexcen, named after Ben Lexcen, who was the designer of the Australia II yacht that won the 1983 America's Cup. The original (VN) T1 Lexcen offered sedan and station wagon body forms in three levels of trim: base, GL and GLX. Moreover, they were only available with a 3.8-litre V6 engine and automatic transmission combination.

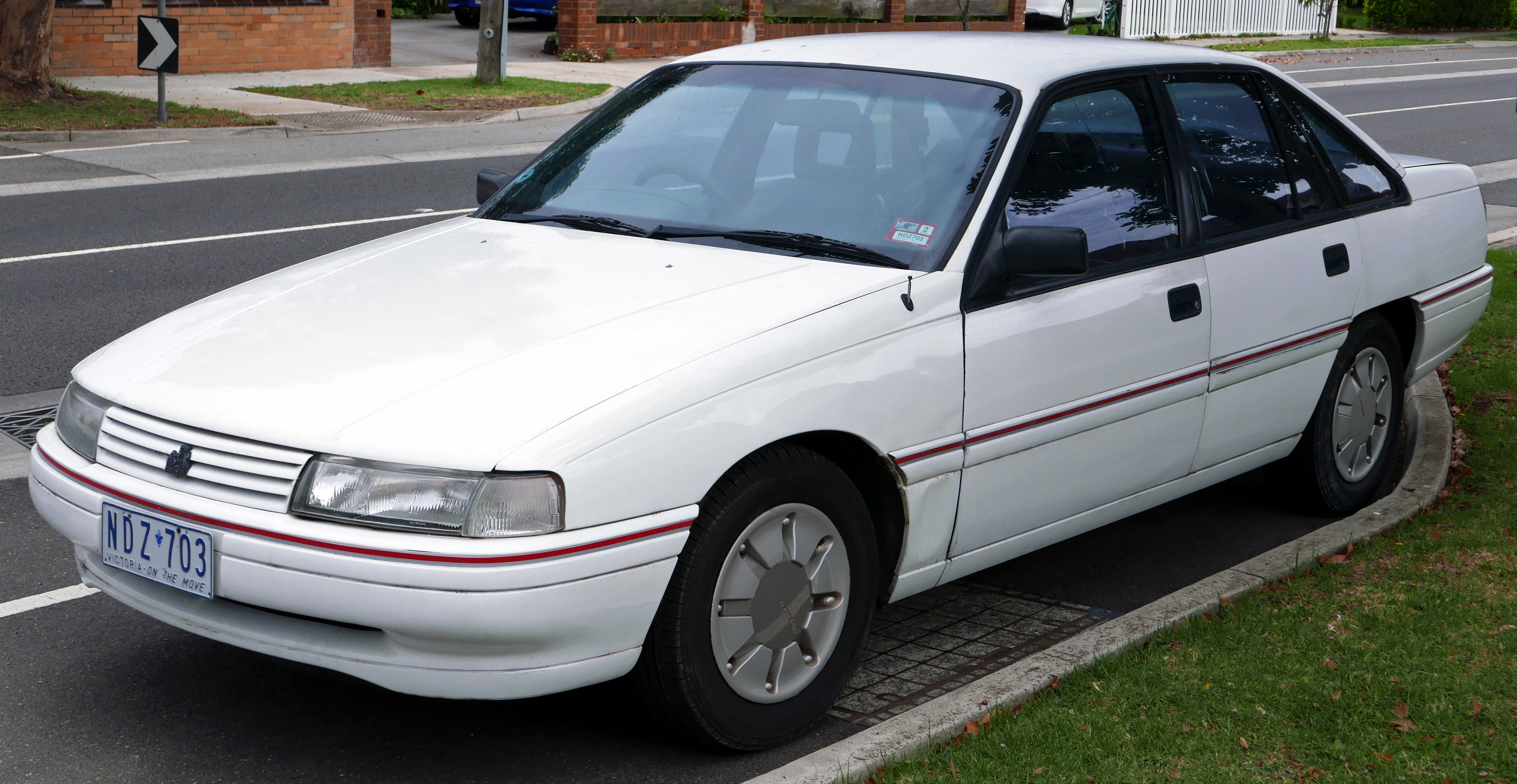
Sedan (S)

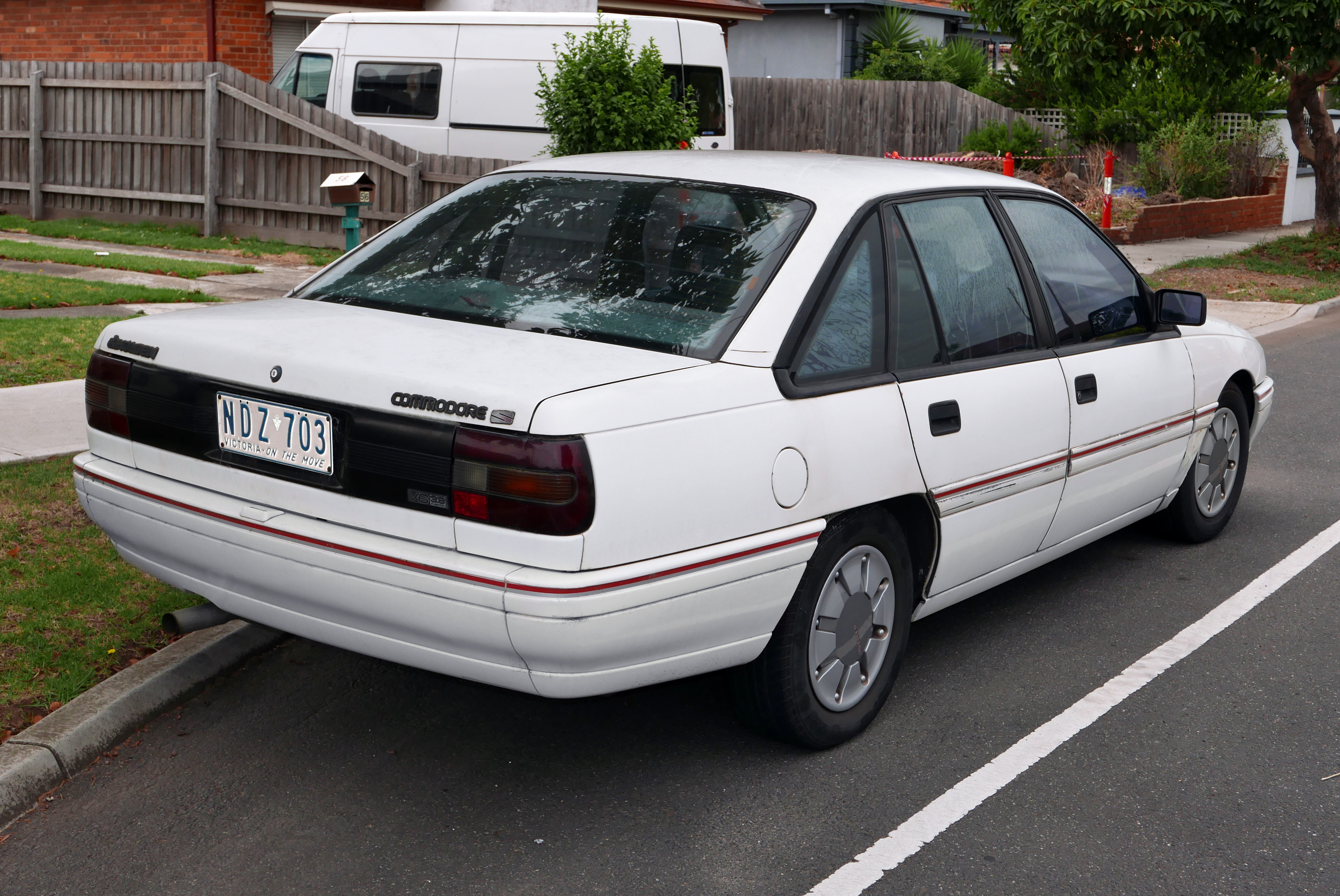
Sedan (S)

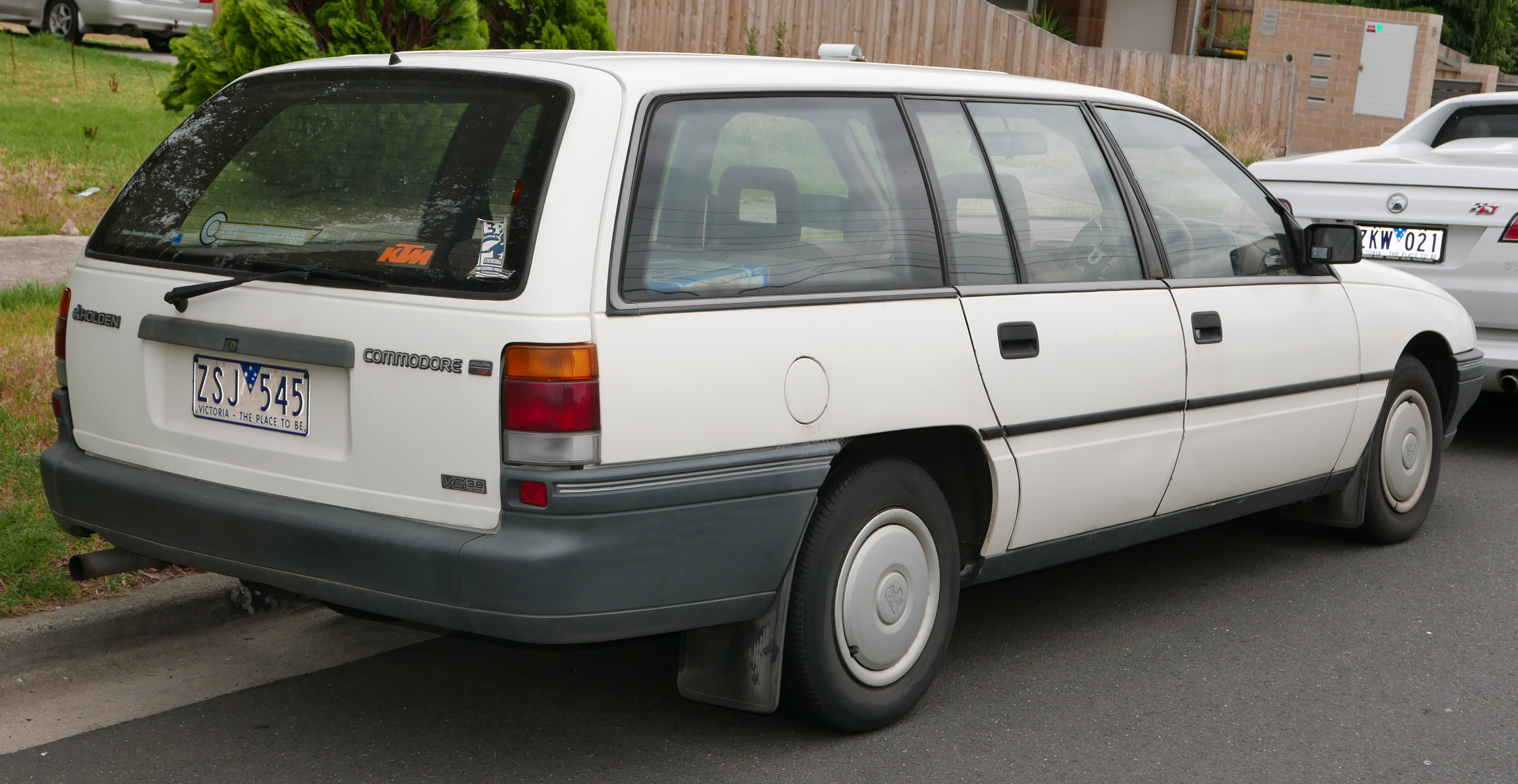
Station Wagon (Executive)

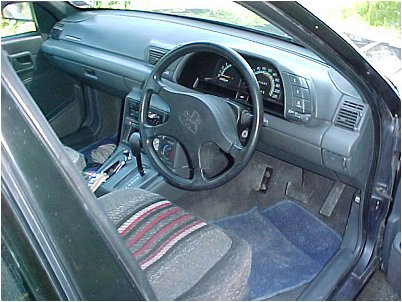
Interior

=== VP (1991–1993) ===
The VP update of 1991 featured cosmetic and mechanical changes, while carrying over the 3.8-litre V6 and 5.0-litre V8 engines from the VN. The 2.0-litre straight-four engine previously available in New Zealand was discontinued. Exterior cosmetic changes included a translucent acrylic grille on the base level Executive and Berlina, with a colour-coded grille for the S and SS, and a chrome grille for Calais. Updated tail lights and boot garnishes were also a part of the changes, which were different for each model, with the Berlina having grey stripes and the Calais chrome stripes. semi-trailing arm independent rear suspension became standard on the Calais and SS, but was made an option on lower-end models in lieu of the live rear axle, improving ride and handling.

A new wider front track was introduced to address issues with the previous carried-over VL chassis components. In August 1992, anti-lock brakes were introduced as an option on the Calais and SS trim levels, later becoming optional on all Series II variants. This January 1993 update also included a colour-coded grille for the Executive and alloy wheels for the Commodore S.

Toyota's pattern of updating their Lexcen model tended to follow Commodore's model cycle. The T2 (VP) Lexcen from 1991 pioneered new specification designations: CSi, VXi and Newport. All future updates T3 (VR), T4 (VS), and T5 (VS II) Lexcens made use of the new naming system until 1997, when the badge engineering scheme ceased. To give further differentiation to the Lexcen from the Commodore, the Lexcens from the VP model onwards had unique front-end styling treatments.

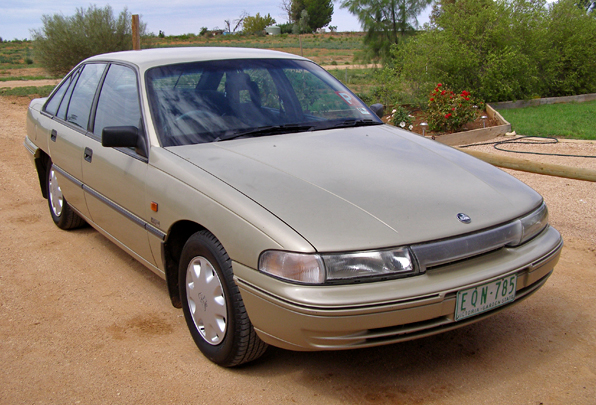
Sedan (Executive, Series 1)

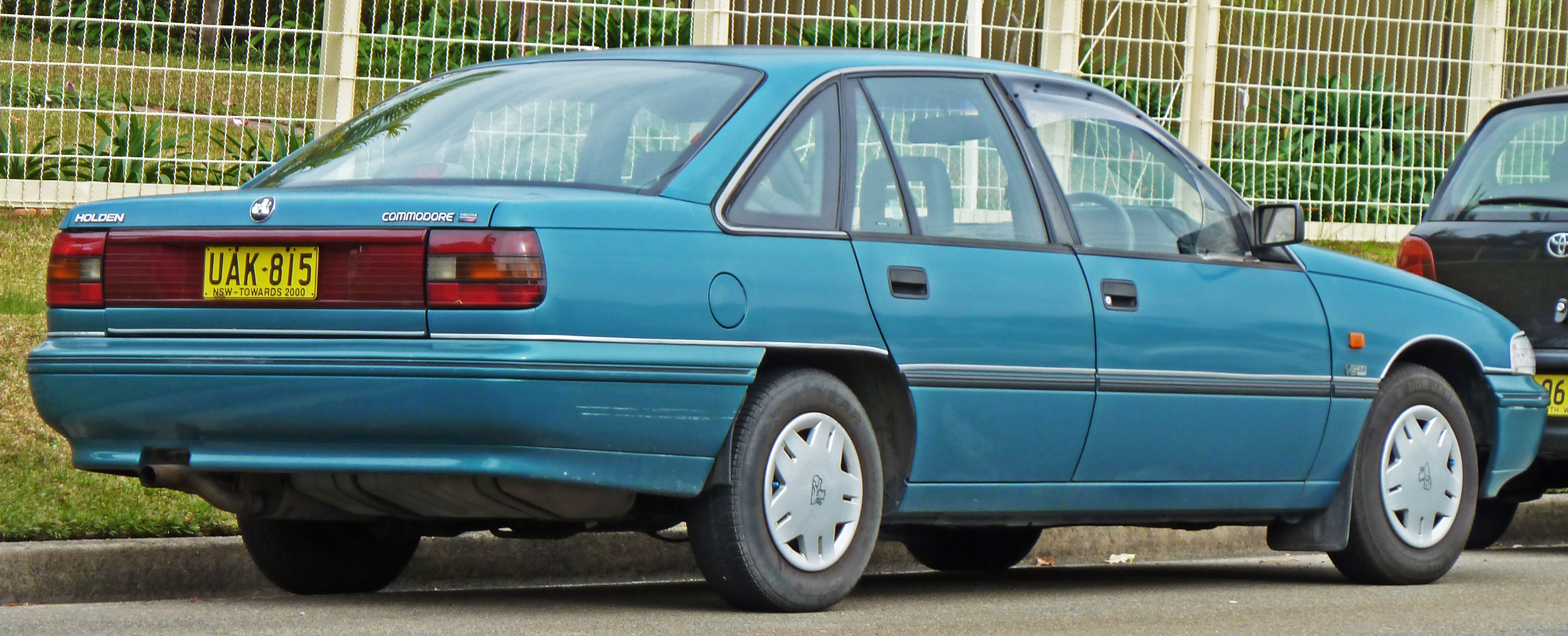
Sedan (Executive, Series 1)

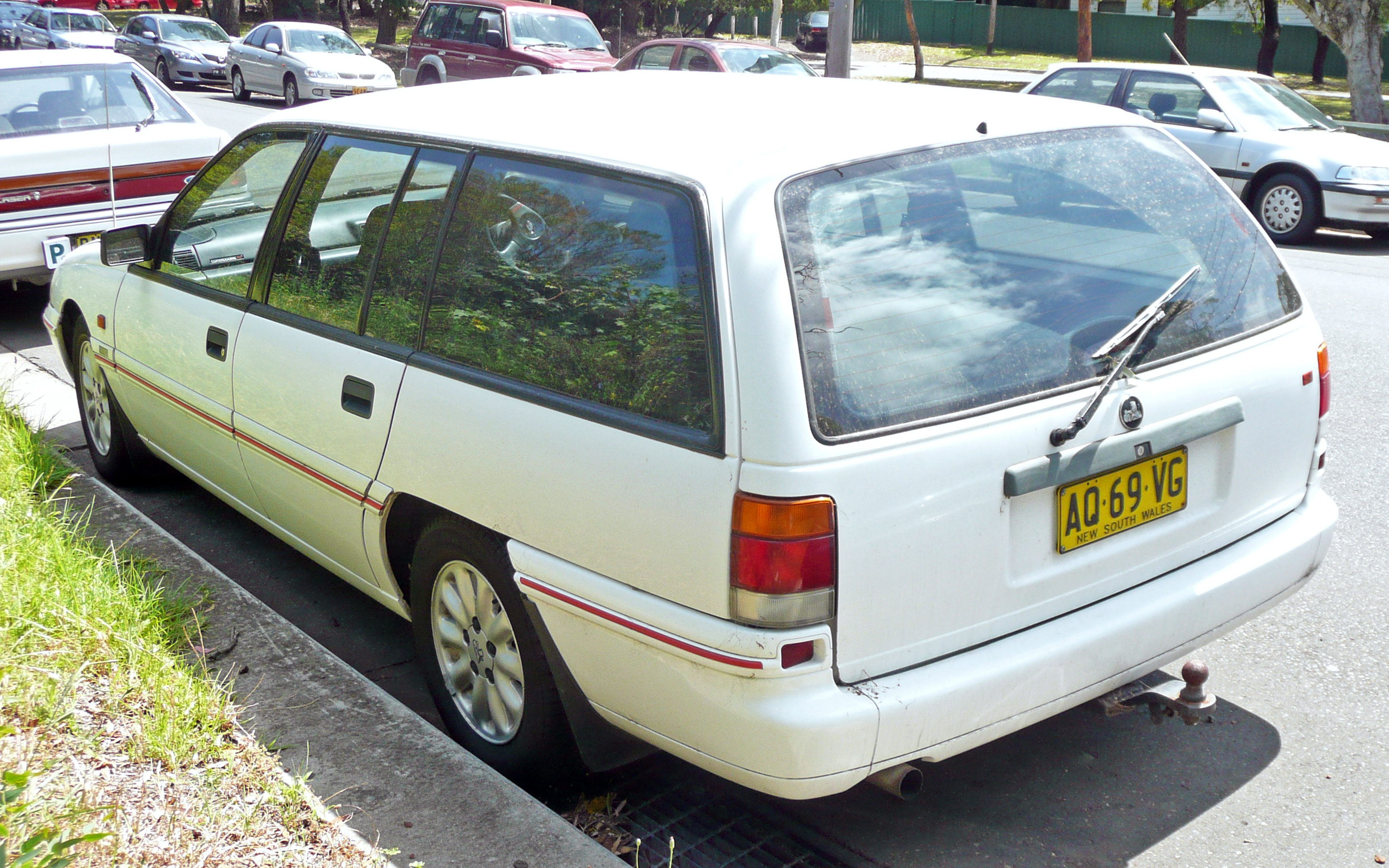
Station Wagon (S, Series 1)

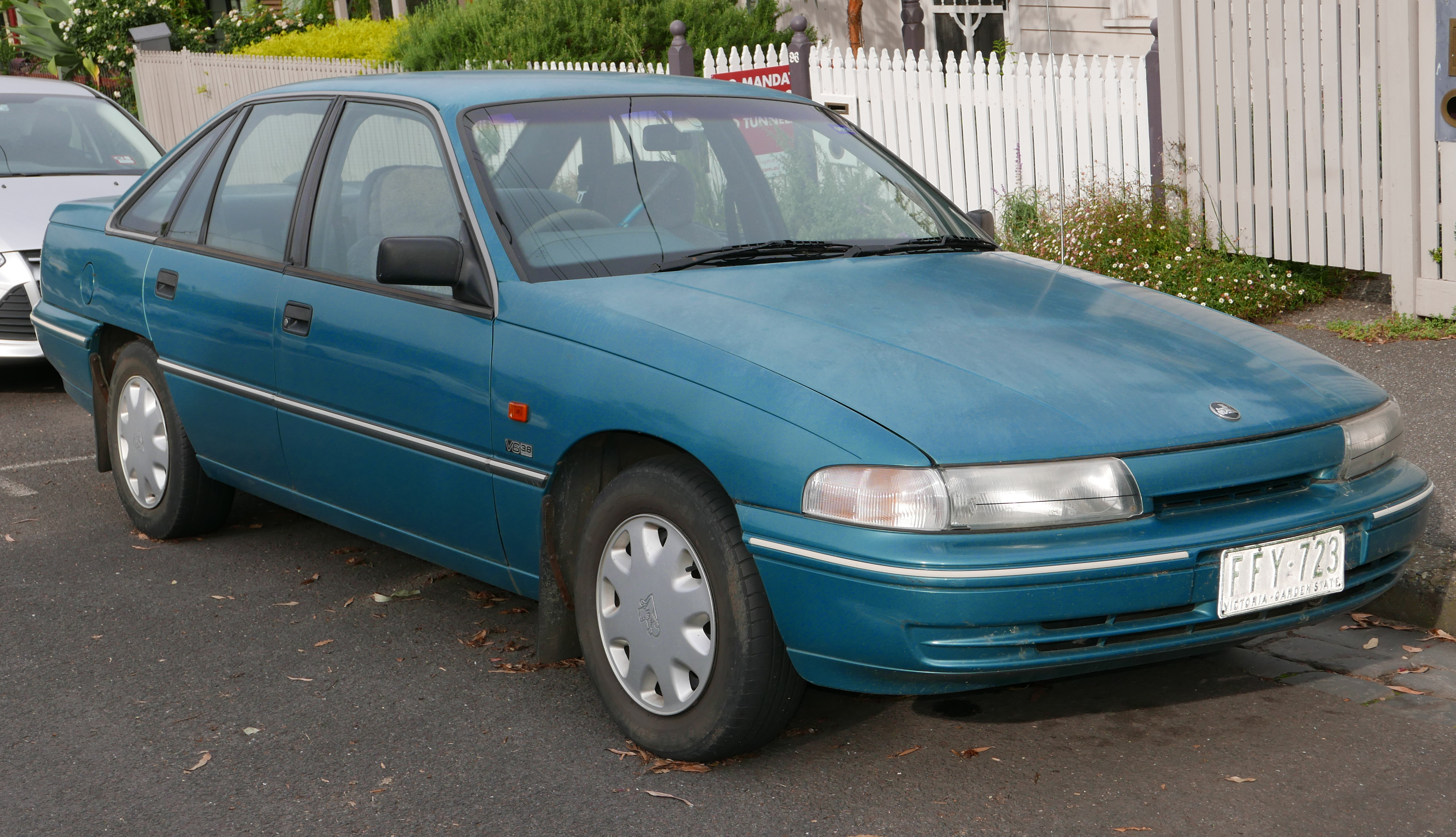
Sedan (Executive, Series 2)

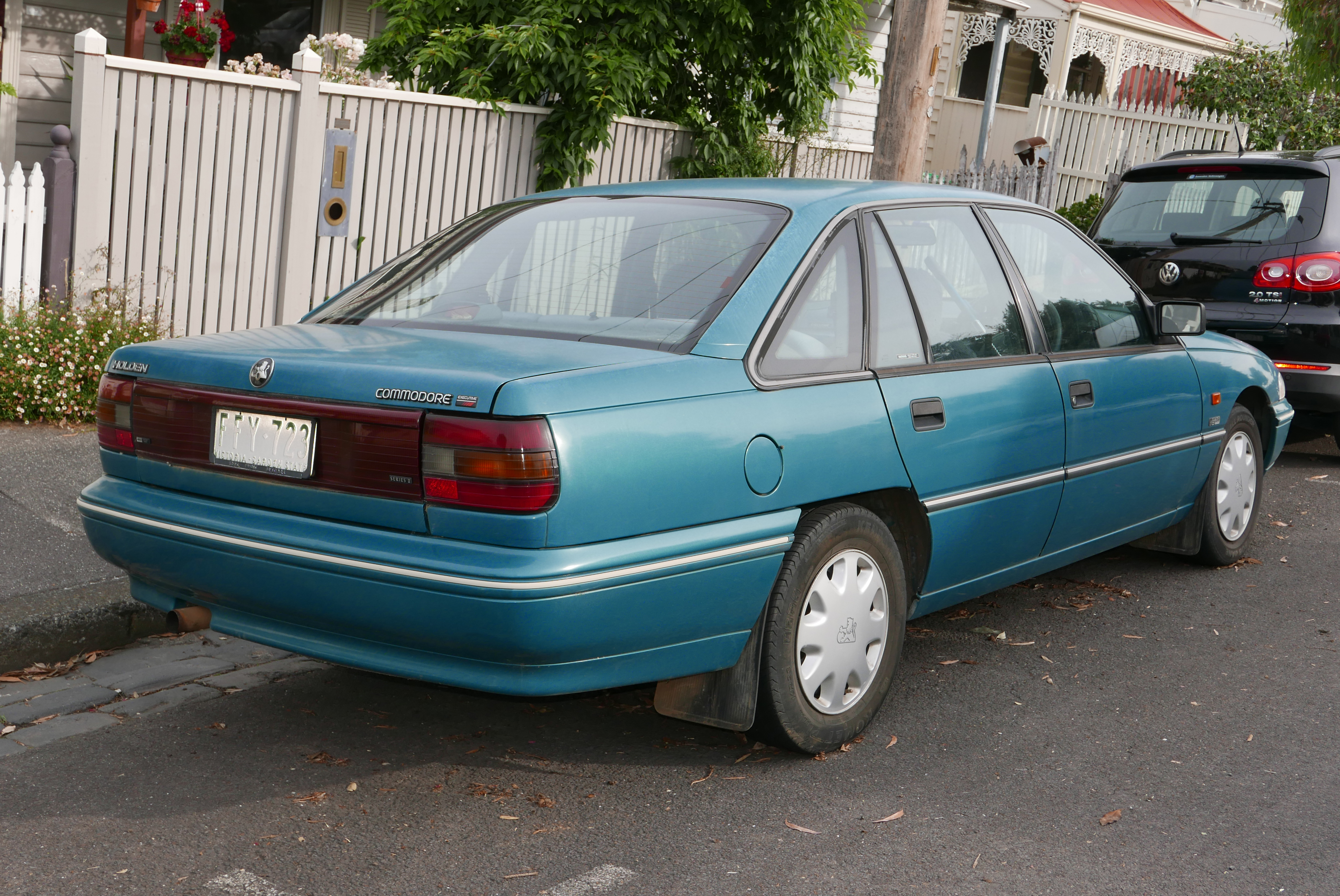
Sedan (Executive, Series 2)

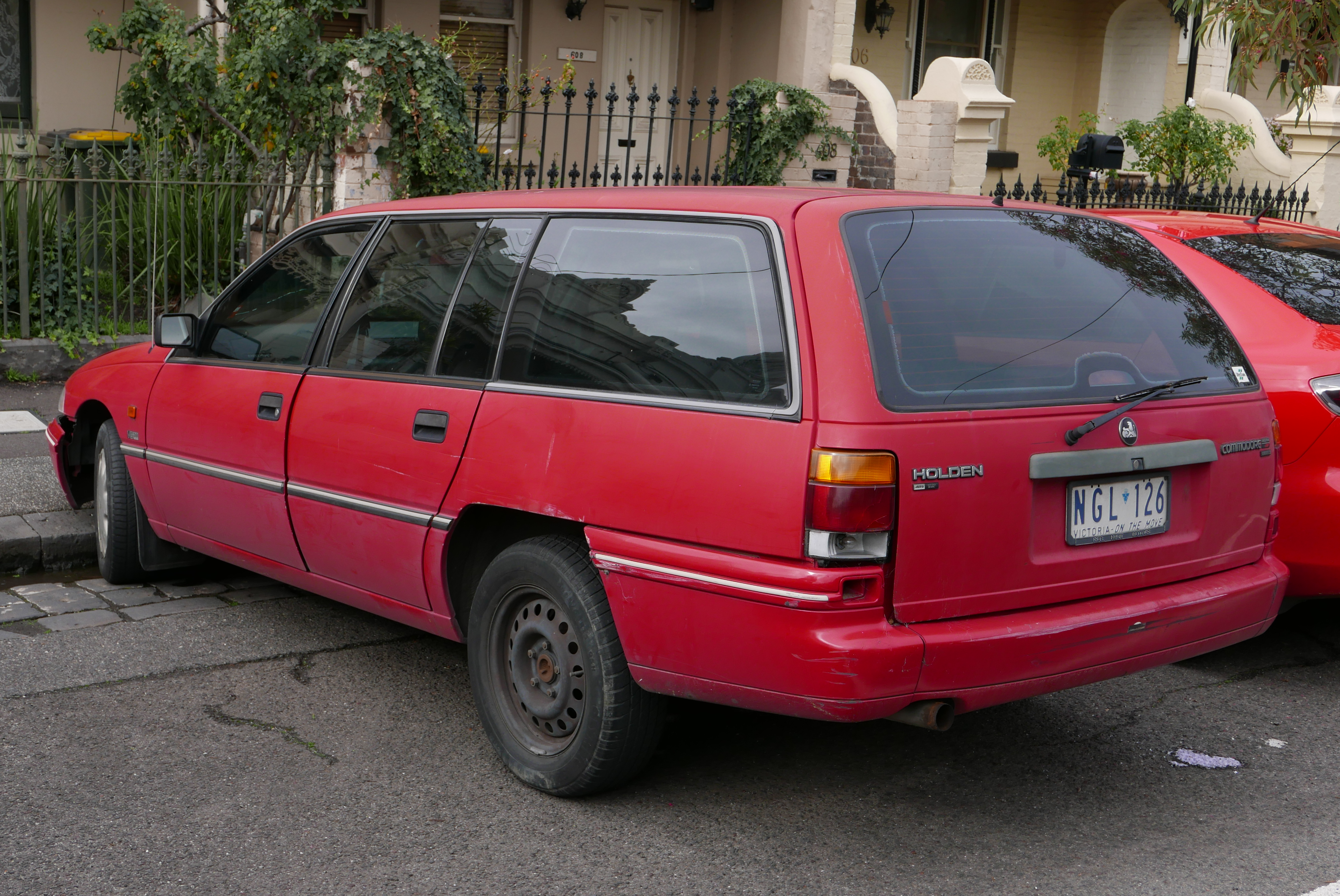
Station wagon (Executive, Series 2)

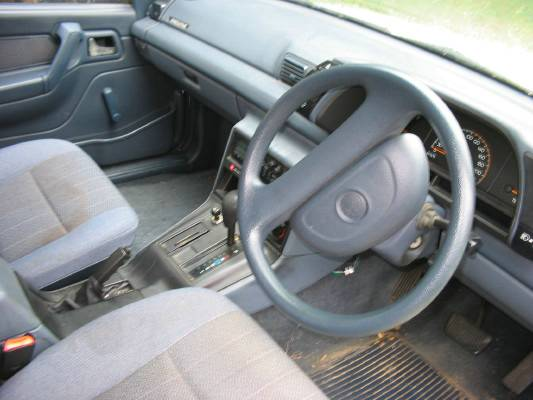
Interior

=== VR (1993–1995) ===
The 1993 VR Commodore represented a major facelift of the second generation architecture leaving only the doors and roof untouched. Approximately 80 percent of car was new in comparison to the preceding model. Exterior changes brought an overall smoother body, semicircular wheel arches and the "twin-kidney" grille—a Commodore styling trait which remained until the VX and VU Commodore models ended production in 2002.

The rear-end treatment saw raised tail lights, implemented for safety reasons, and a driver's side airbag was introduced as an option: a first for an Australian-built car. Other safety features such as anti-lock brakes and independent rear suspension were only available with the new electronic GM 4L60-E automatic transmission. Along with a driver's airbag and cruise control, these features were packaged into a new Acclaim specification level: a family-oriented safety spec above the entry-level Executive. Holden's strong focus on safety can be seen in the Used Car Safety Ratings. The findings show that in an accident, VN/VP Commodores provide a "worse than average" level of occupant protection. However, the updated VR/VS models were found to provide a "better than average" level of safety protection. Holden issued a Series II revision in September 1994 bringing audible warning chimes for the handbrake and fuel level among other changes.

The latest revision of the Buick 3.8-litre V6 engine was fitted to the VR Commodore, featuring rolling-element bearings in the valve rocker arms and increased compression ratios. These changes combined to deliver an increase in power to 130 kW (174 hp) and further improvement in noise, vibration, and harshness levels. Wheels magazine awarded the VR Commodore Car of the Year in 1993.

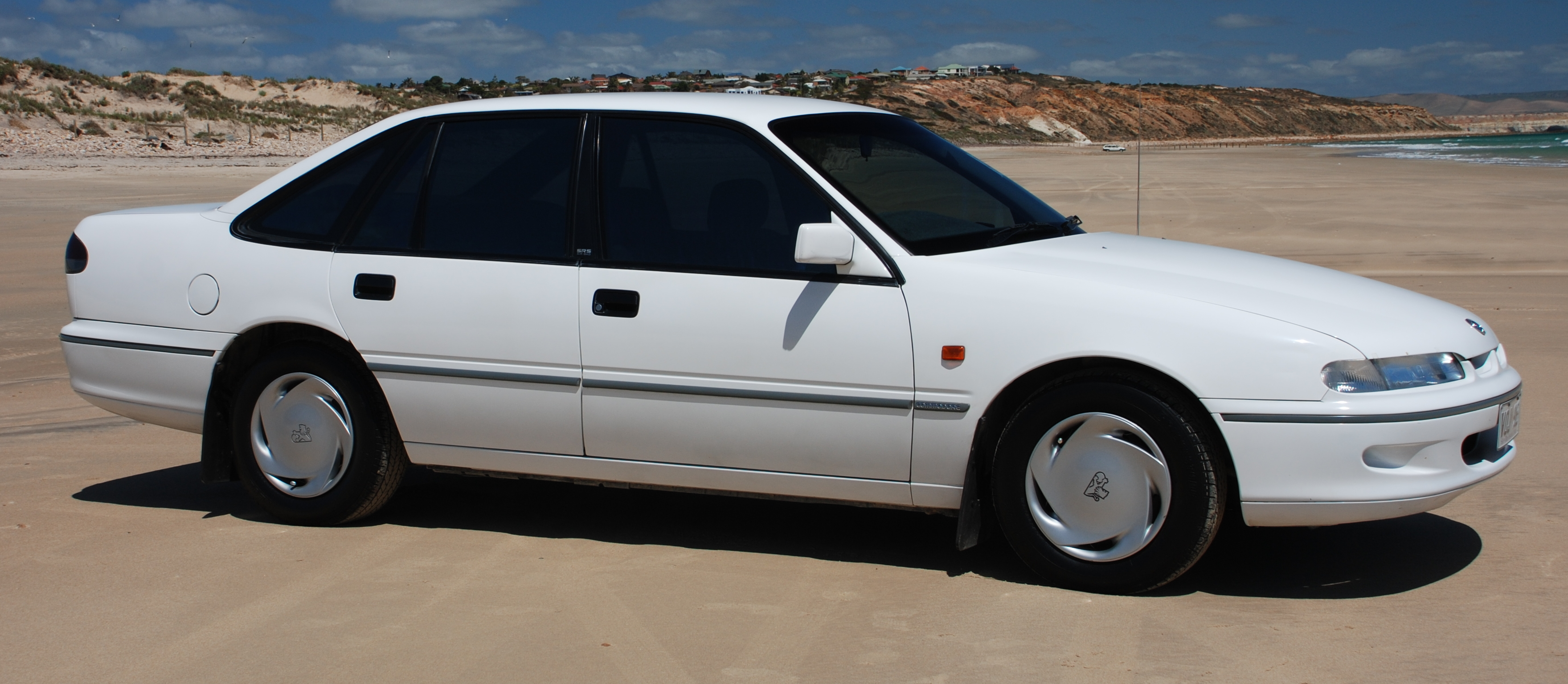
Sedan (Acclaim, Series 1)

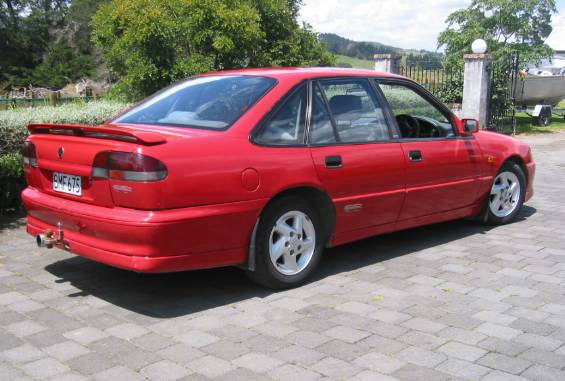
Sedan (SS, Series 1)

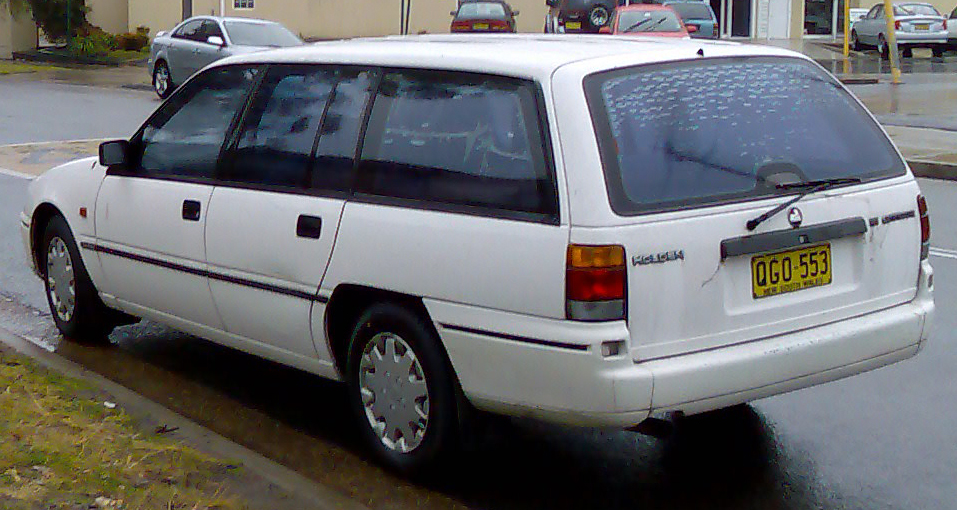
Station Wagon (Executive, Series 1)

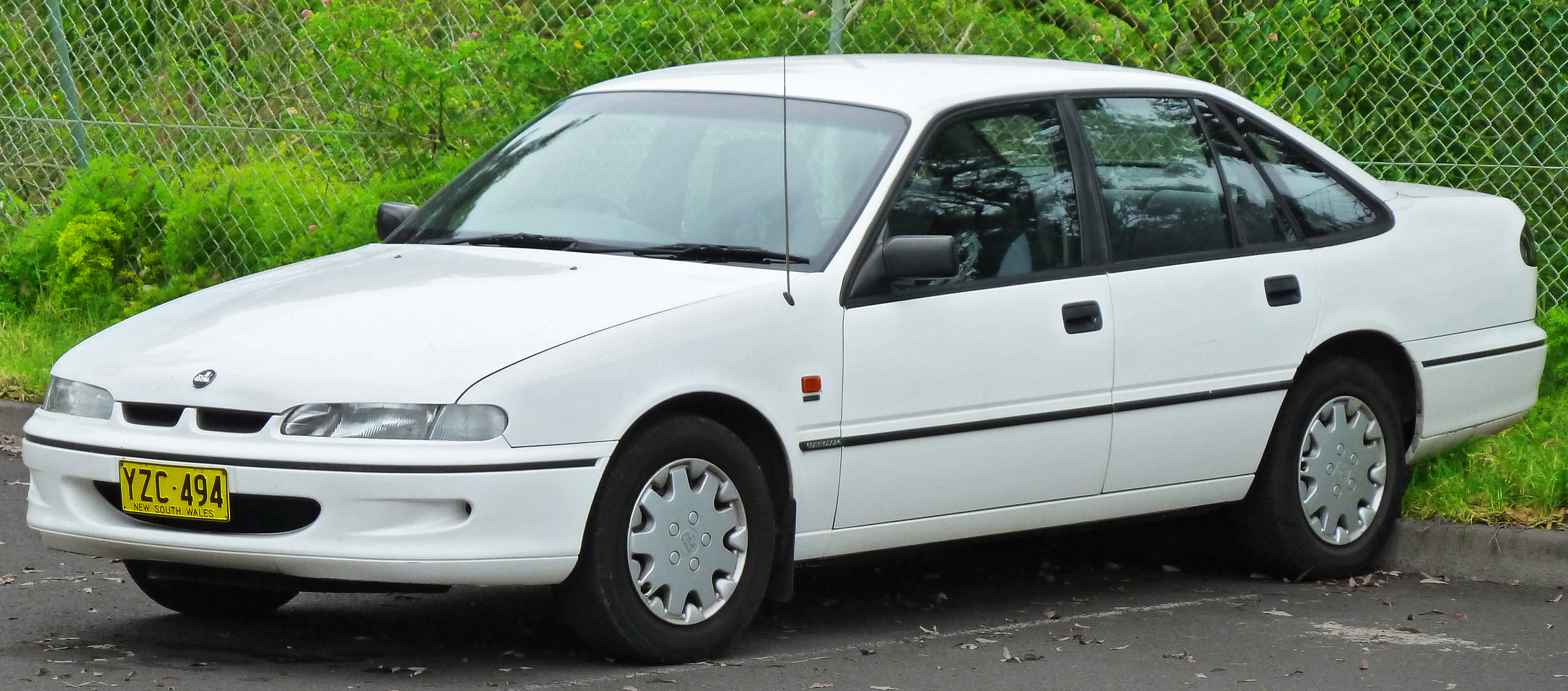
Sedan (Executive, Series 2)

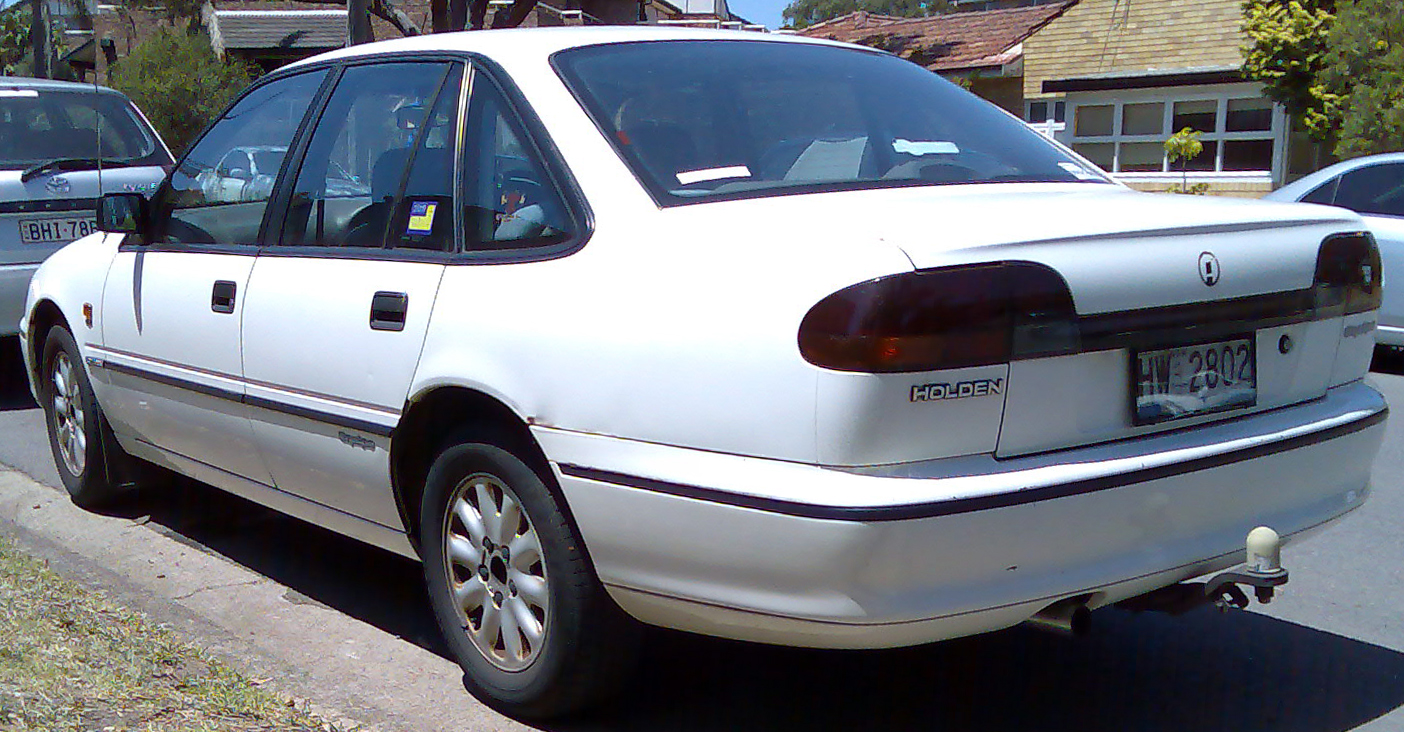
Sedan (Equipe, Series 2)

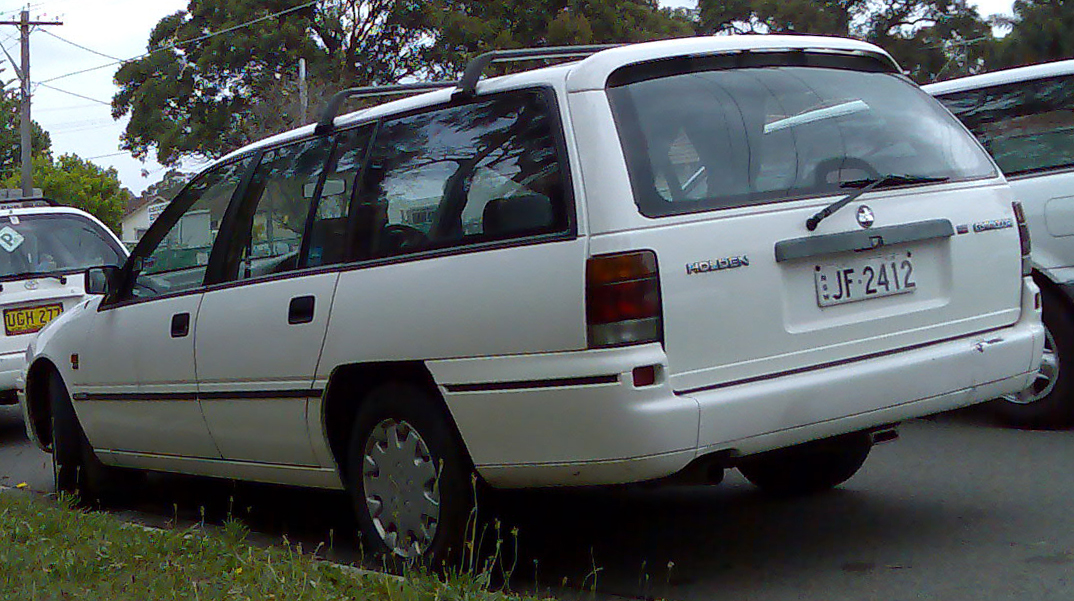
Station Wagon (Executive, Series 2)

=== VS (1995–1997) ===
The 1995 VS Commodore served as a mechanical update of the VR, destined to maintain sales momentum before the arrival of an all-new VT model. The extent of exterior changes amounted to little more than a redesigned Holden logo and wheel trims. An overhauled Ecotec (Emissions and Consumption Optimisation through TEChnology) version of the Buick V6 engine coincided with changes to the engine in the United States. The Ecotec engine packed 13 percent more power for a total of 147 kW (197 hp), cut fuel consumption by 5 percent, increased the compression ratio from 9.0:1 to 9.4:1 and improved on the engine's previous rough characteristics. Holden mated the new engine with a modified version of the GM 4L60-E automatic transmission, improving throttle response and smoothing gear changes. The Series II update of June 1996 included elliptical side turn signals, interior tweaks and the introduction of a supercharged V6 engine for selected trim levels, and the introduction of a new Getrag manual transmission. The new supercharged engine slotted between the existing V6 and V8 engines in the lineup and was officially rated at 165 kW (221 hp), just 3 kW (4.0 hp) below the V8.

The VS Commodore was the last to be sold as a Toyota Lexcen, as Holden and Toyota ended their model-sharing scheme. The last Lexcens were built during 1997. This model was also sold as the VS Commodore Royale in New Zealand. Similar in specification to the Calais also sold in New Zealand, the Royale featured a standard VS Commodore body with the front end from the VS Caprice and an Opel 2.6-litre 54-Degree V6 engine. The Royale was also sold between 1995 and 1997 in small numbers to Malaysia and Singapore as the Opel Calais.

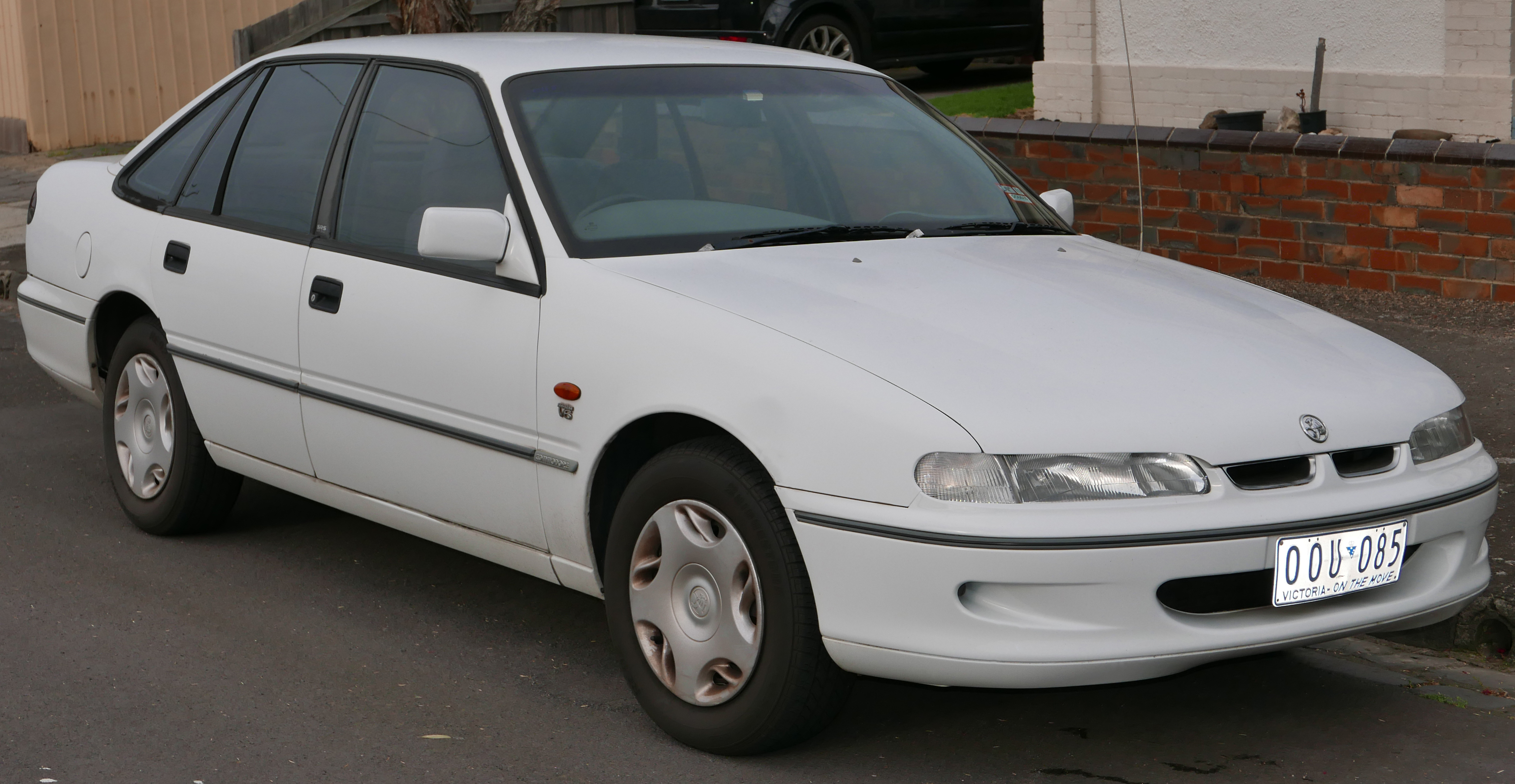
Commodore Acclaim (VS II)

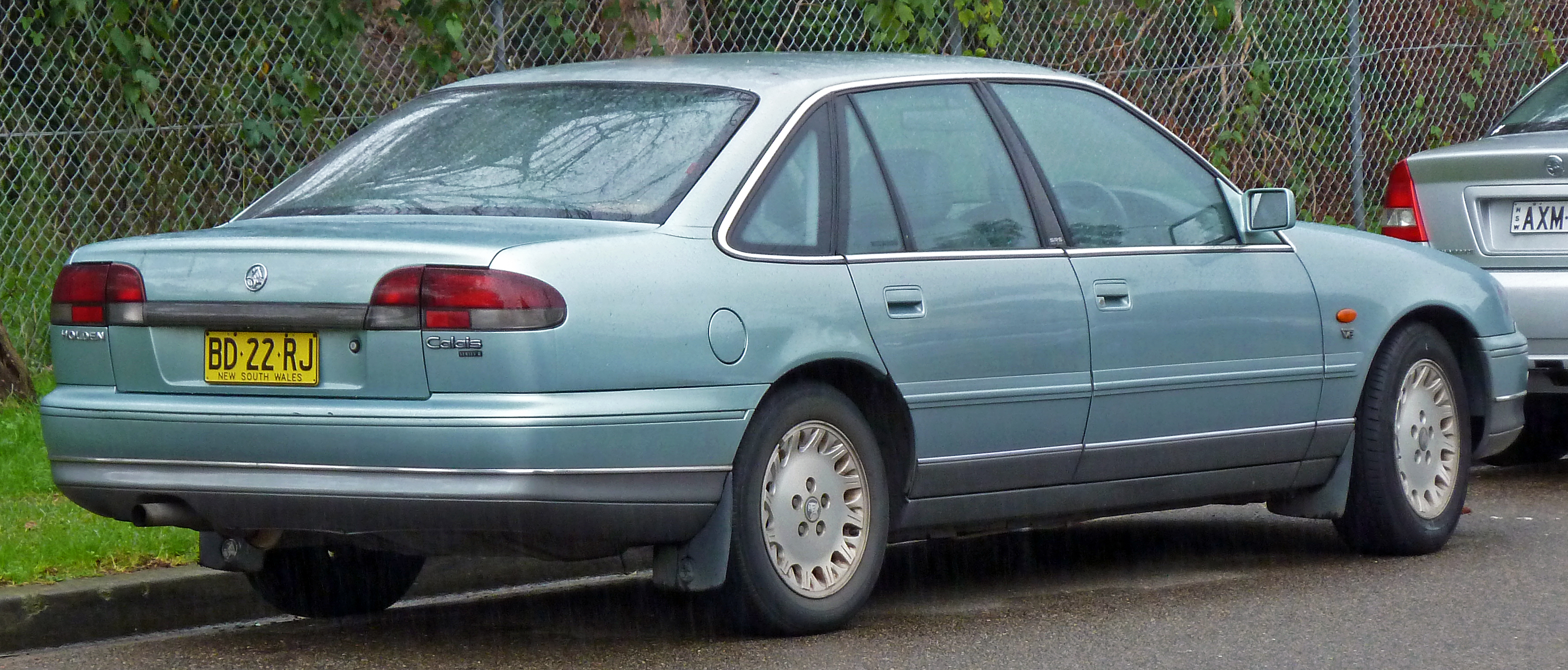
Calais sedan (VS II)

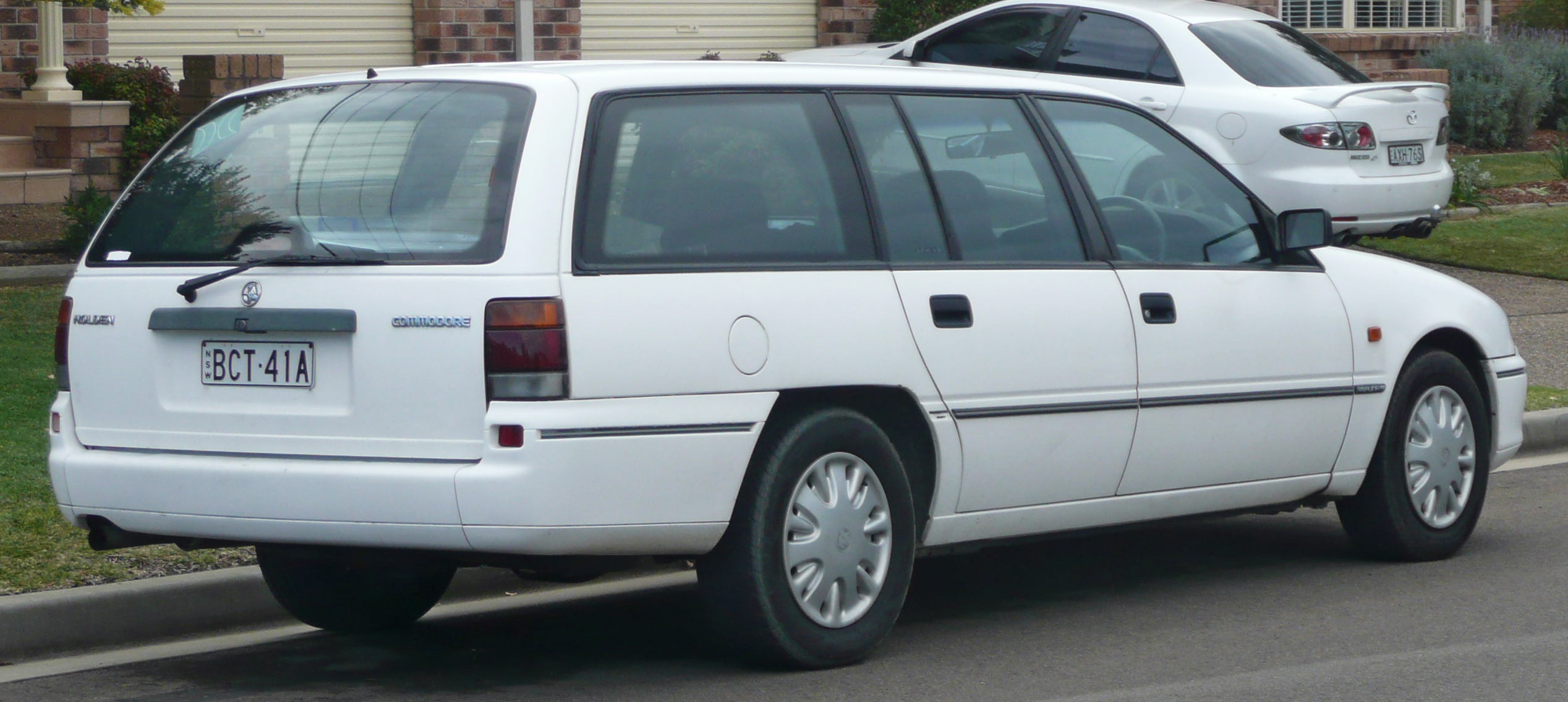
Commodore Executive wagon (VS)

== Third generation (1997–2007) ==
=== VT (1997–2000) ===
With the VT Commodore of 1997, Holden looked again to Opel in Germany for a donor platform. The proposal was to take the Opel Omega B and broaden the vehicle's width and mechanical setup for local conditions. In the early days, Holden considered adopting the Omega as is, save for the engines and transmissions, and even investigated reskinning the existing VR/VS architecture. Later on, the VT bodywork spawned a new generation of Statesman and Caprice (again based on the long-wheelbase wagons), and even went as far as resurrecting the iconic Monaro coupé of the 1960s and 1970s via a prototype presented at the 1998 Sydney Motor Show.

The VT heralded the fitment of semi-trailing arm independent rear suspension as standard across the range, a significant selling point over the rival Falcon, along with increased electronics such as Traction Control. However, in terms of suspension, the original Opel design was simplified by removing the toe control links that was standard equipment on the European Omega since 1987. Consequently, this afflicted the VT with excessive tyre wear due to distortions to the suspension camber angle and toe under heavy load, such as heavy towing or when travelling over undulated surfaces.

Notably, Holden's performance arm HSV re-added the toe control link on the flagship GTS 300 model. The 1999 Series II update replaced the venerable Holden 5.0-litre V8 engine with a new 5.7-litre Generation III V8 sourced from the United States. The V8 was detuned to 220 kW (295 hp) from the original US version, but would receive incremental power upgrades to 250 kW (335 hp) throughout its time in the Commodore, before finally being replaced by the related Generation 4 in the VZ. The supercharged V6 was uprated to 171 kW (229 hp) from the VS. Safety wise, side airbags became an option for the Acclaim and higher models, a first for Holden.

From the onset, parent company General Motors was interested in incorporating a left-hand drive Commodore in its Buick lineup, as manifested by the unveiling of the Buick XP2000 concept car in 1996. Although this idea was ultimately abandoned (due to pressures by the North American automotive trade unions to retain local production), the GM-funded project allowed Holden to enter into a range of left-hand export markets. Thus began the Commodore's rapid expansion into parts of Indochina, the Middle East and South Africa badged as the Chevrolet Lumina and Brazil as the Chevrolet Omega 3.8 V6. In its home market, the VT series was awarded the 1997 Wheels Car of the Year award, the fourth such award in Commodore's history. It found ready acceptance in the market as many buyers steered away from the slow selling Ford AU Falcon, becoming the best selling Commodore to date and cementing its place as number one in Australian sales.

The sedan and wagon range comprised: Commodore Executive (base and fleet package); Commodore Acclaim (family and safety package); Berlina (luxury package) and Calais (sedan-only sport luxury package). Limited editions included a "Sydney 2000" Olympic version and Holden 50th Anniversary based on better equipped Executive models (e.g. Berlina alloy wheels on the former but no climate control).

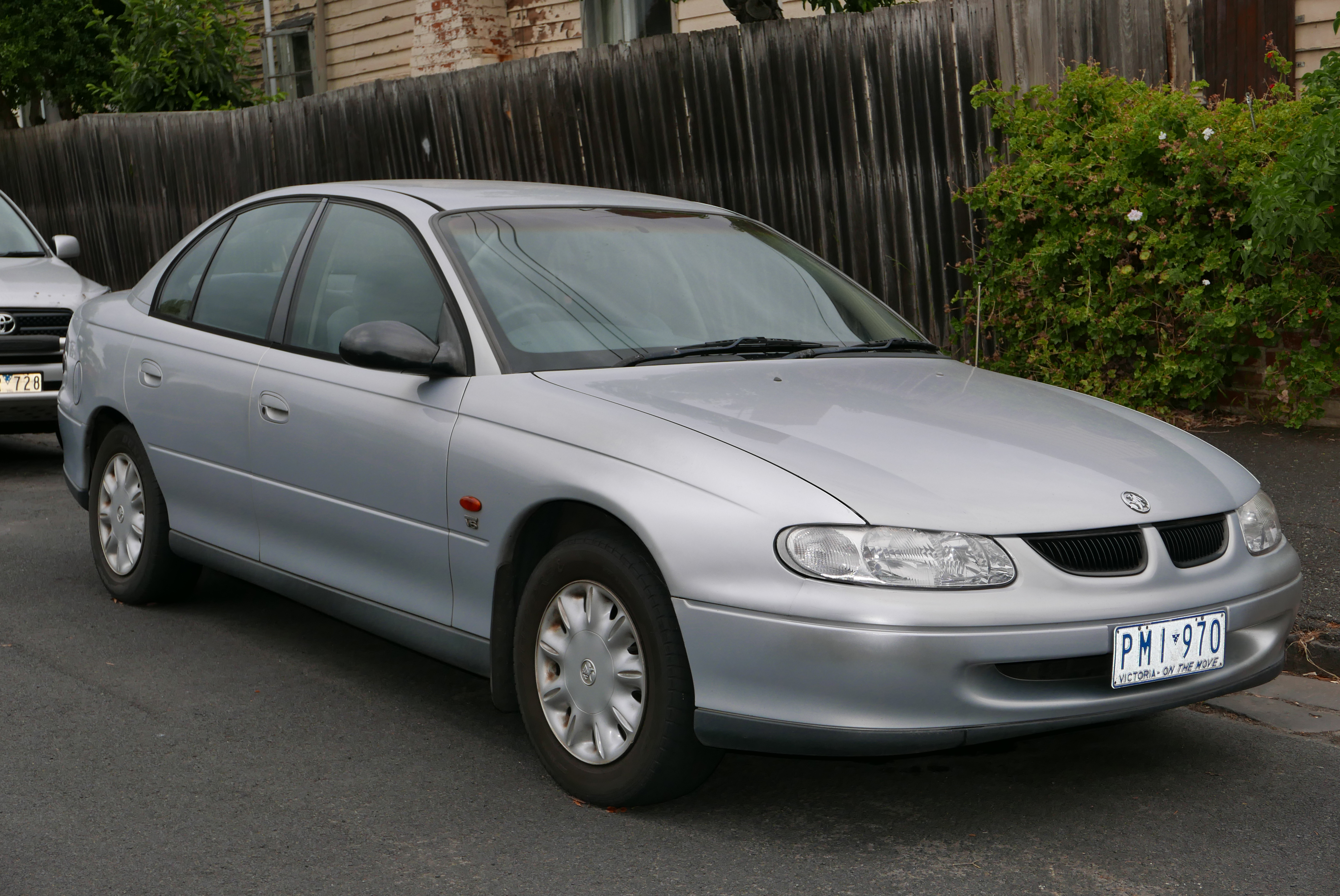
Sedan (Executive, Series 1)

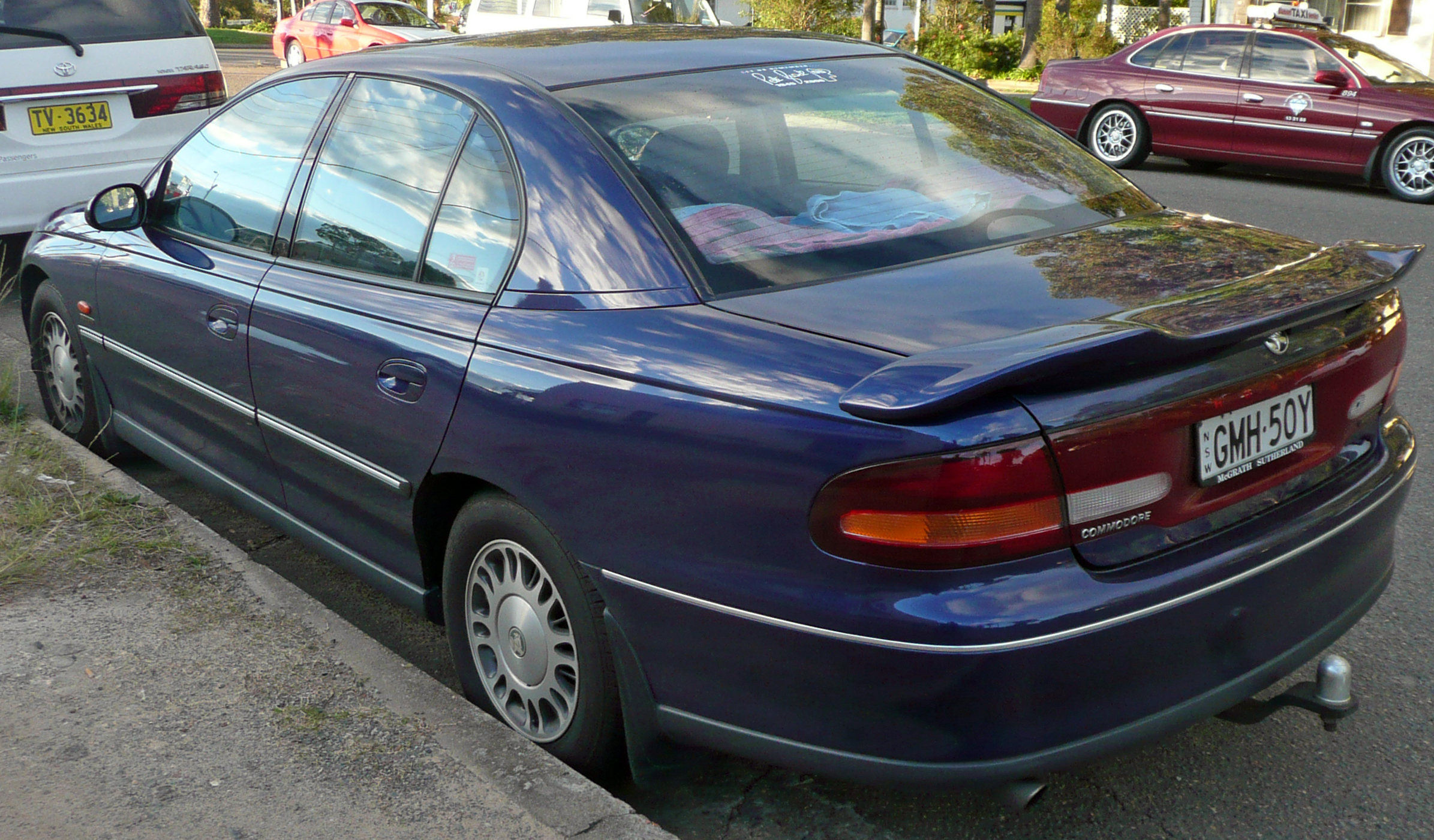
Sedan (50th Anniversary, Series 1)

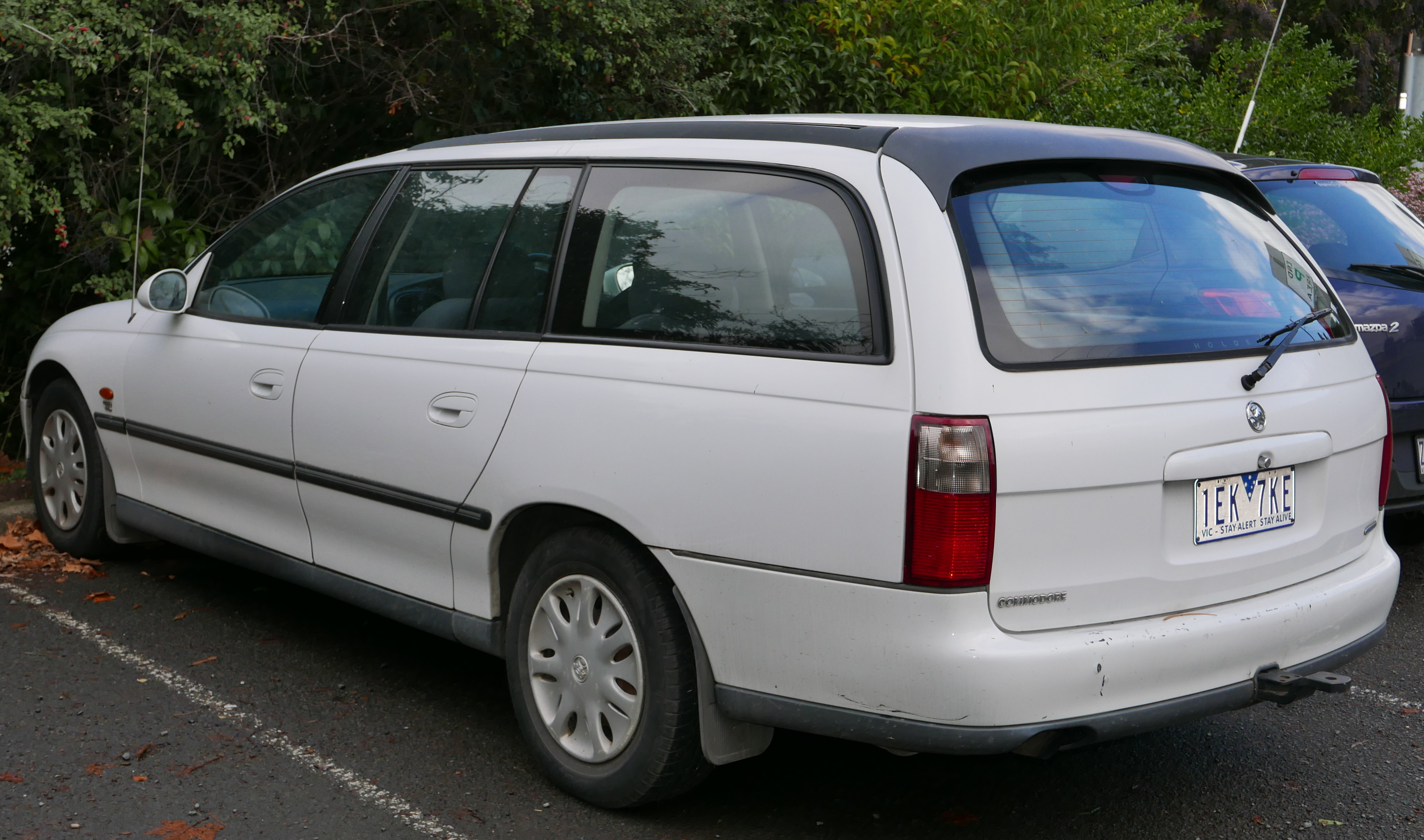
Station Wagon (Acclaim, Series 1)

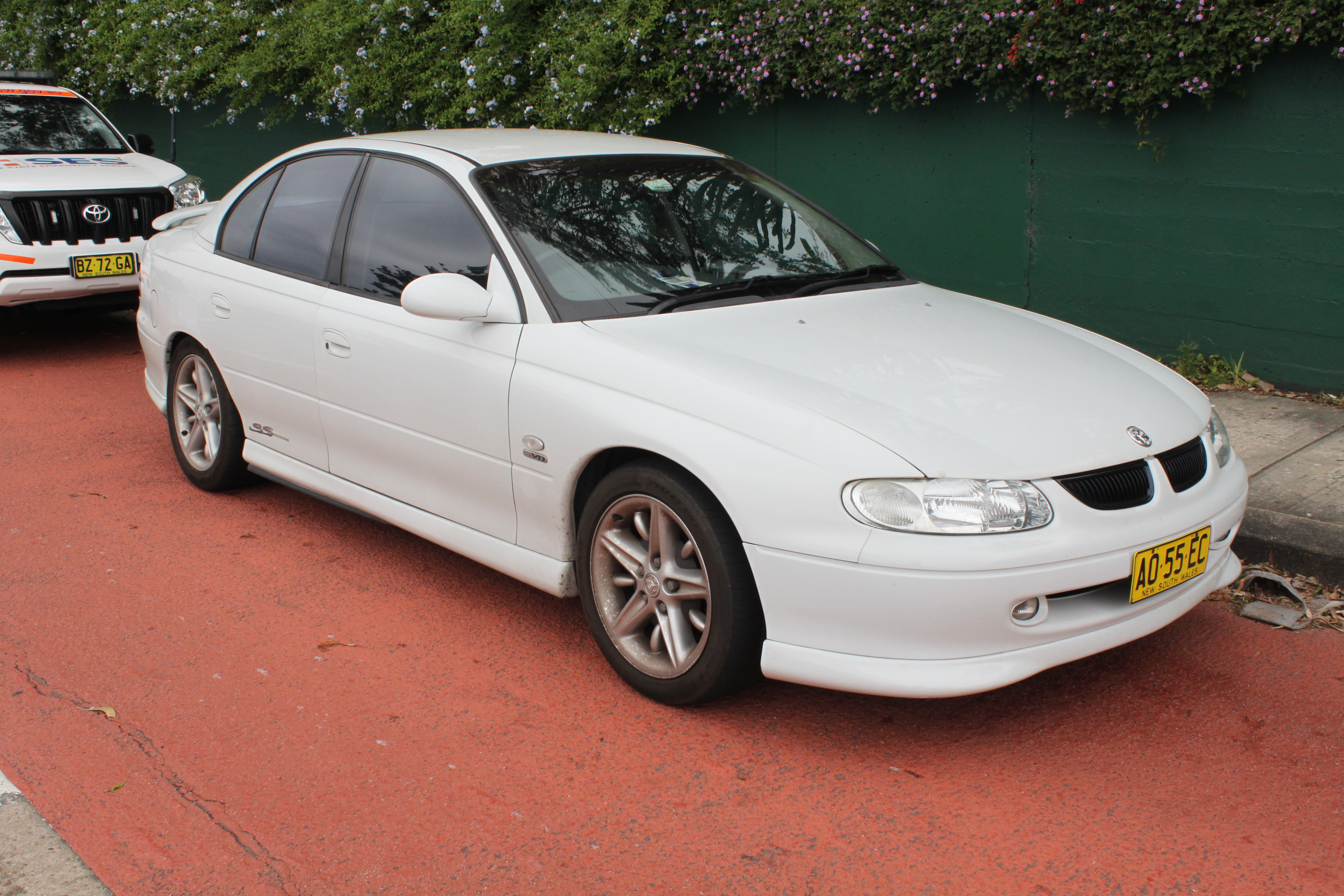
Sedan (SS, Series 2)

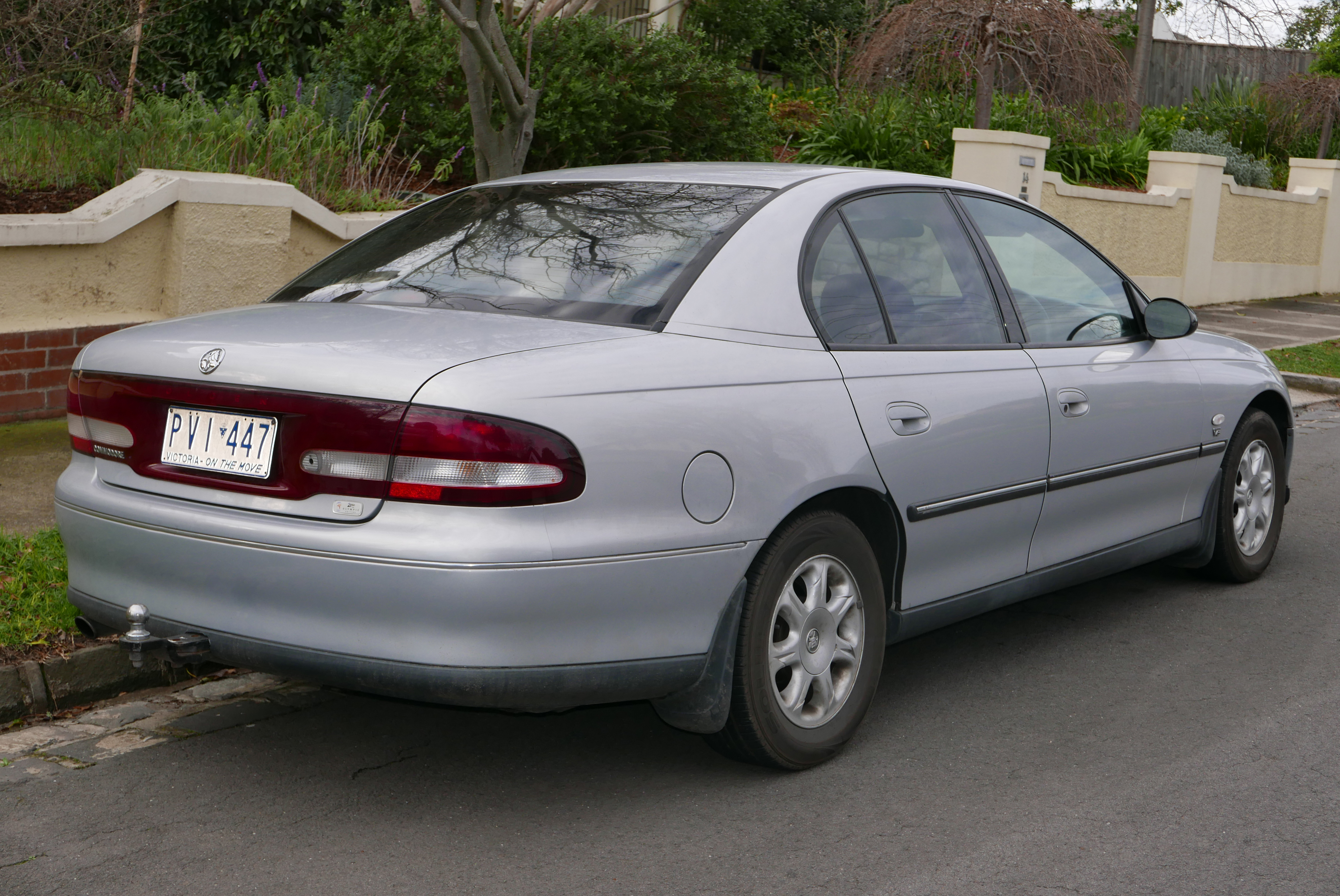
Sedan (Olympic Edition, Series 2)

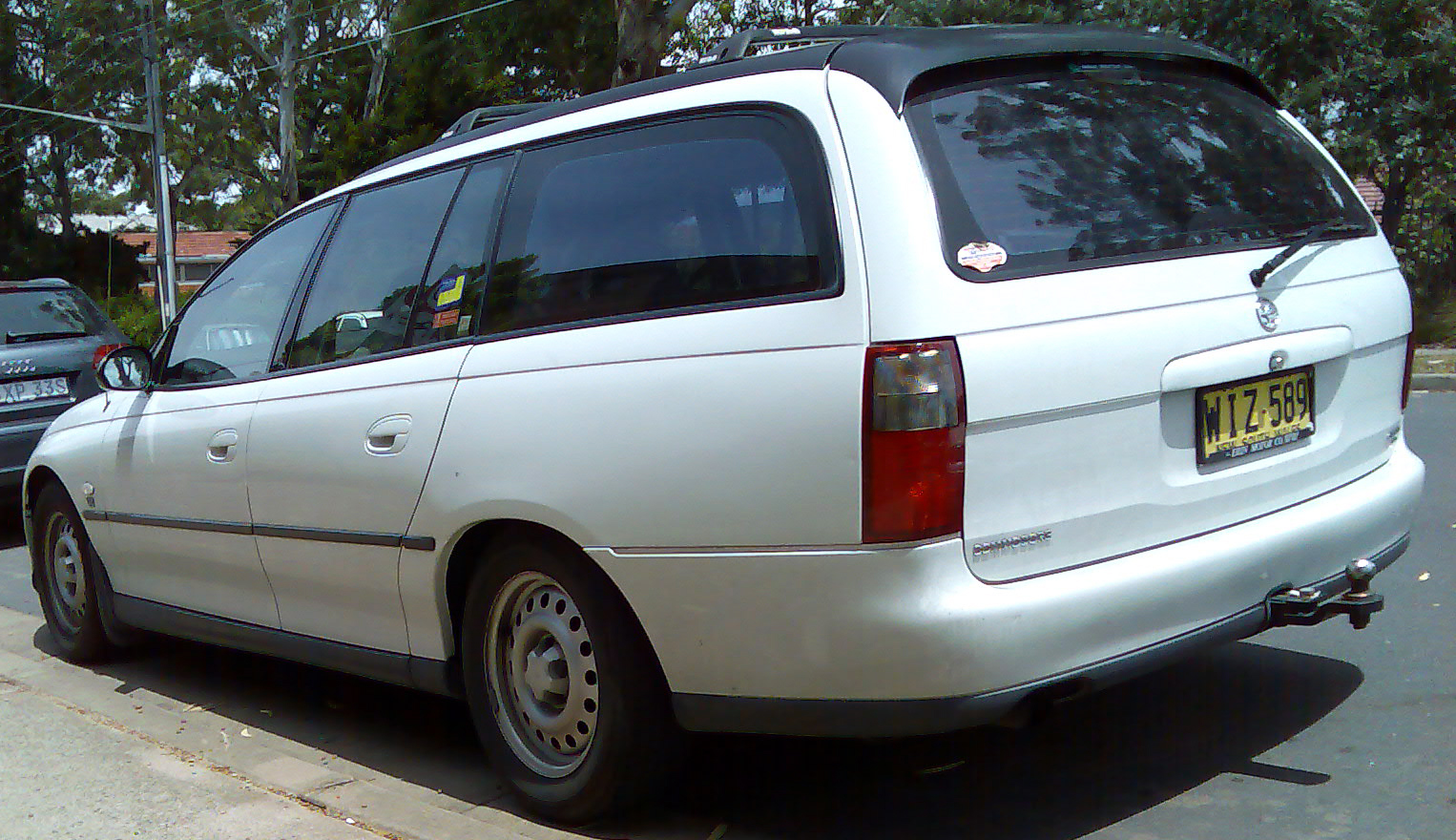
Station Wagon (Executive, Series 2)

=== VX (2000–2002) ===
The VX update from 2000 featured a revised headlamp design. The VT's rear tail lamp panel was replaced by two separate light assemblies. Conversely, the luxury-oriented Berlina and Calais sedans continued using a full-width boot-lid panel incorporating the registration plate and tail lamps.

The VX series also formed the basis for a new Holden Ute, designated the VU-series. Earlier utility models were instead entitled "Commodore utility". An updated Series II was launched in early 2002, featuring revised rear suspension system now equipped with toe control links to address the VT's issues. The VX series also spawned the production version of the relaunched Holden Monaro (allowing Holden to commence exports to the United States, with this coupé sold as the Pontiac GTO).

Safety played a substantial role in the development of the VX model. Bosch 5.3 anti-lock brakes were made standard on all variants, a first for an Australian manufactured car; and traction control was made available on vehicles equipped with manual transmission. Extensive research was undertaken to reduce the effects from a side-impact collision through modification of the B-pillars. The risk presented by a side-impact collision in a VX fitted without side airbags is reduced by 50 percent when compared to a similarly specified VT model.

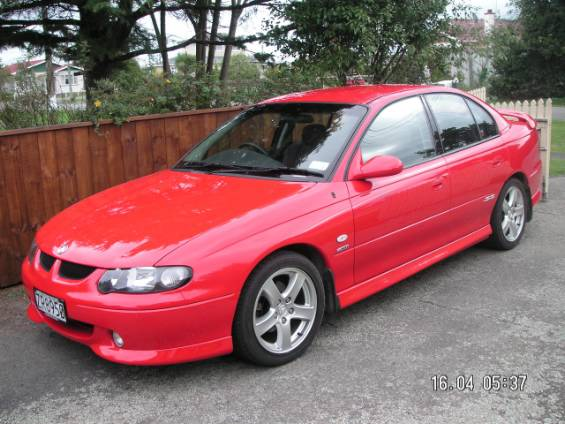
Sedan (SS; Series 1)

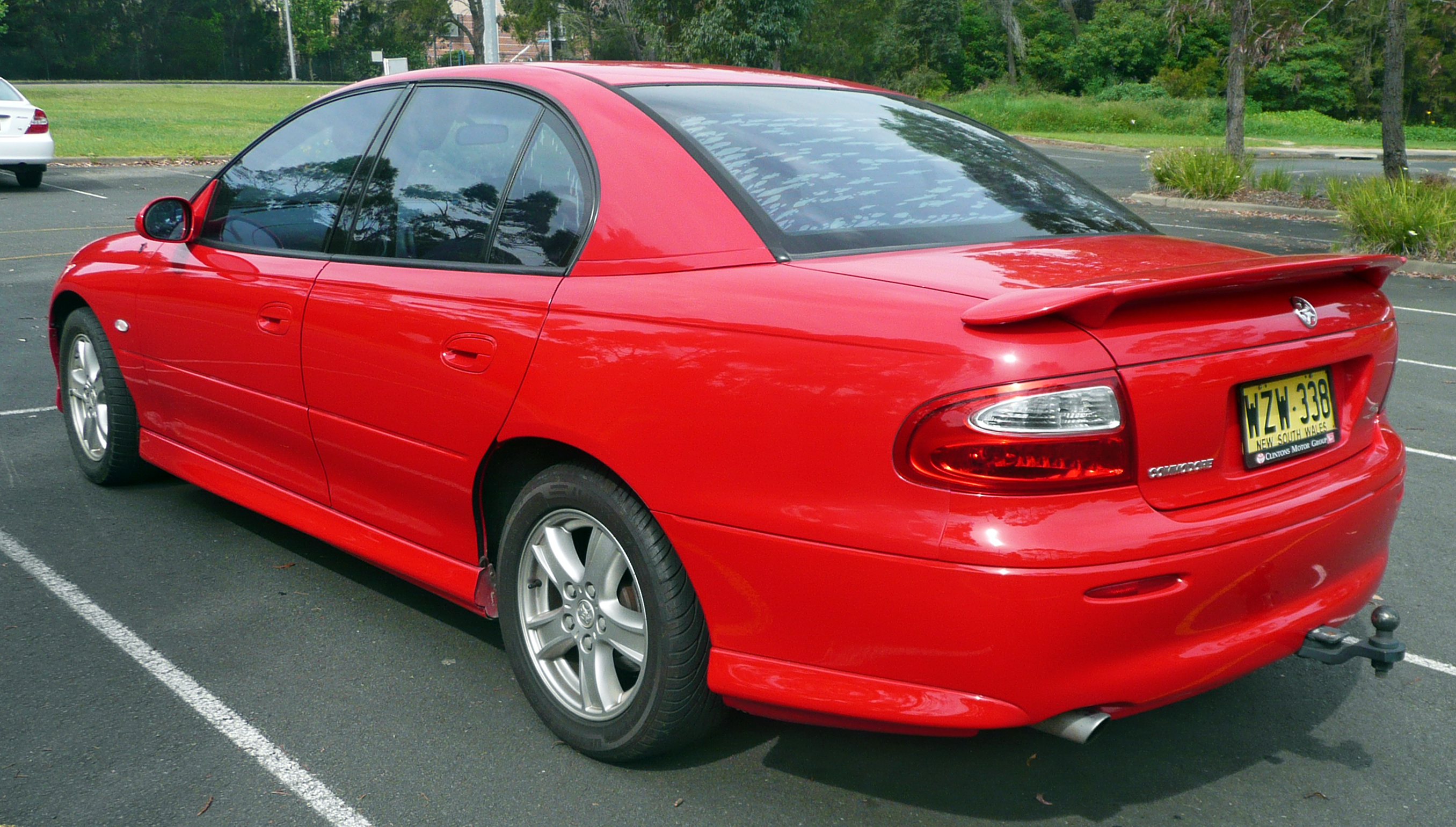
Sedan (S; Series 1)

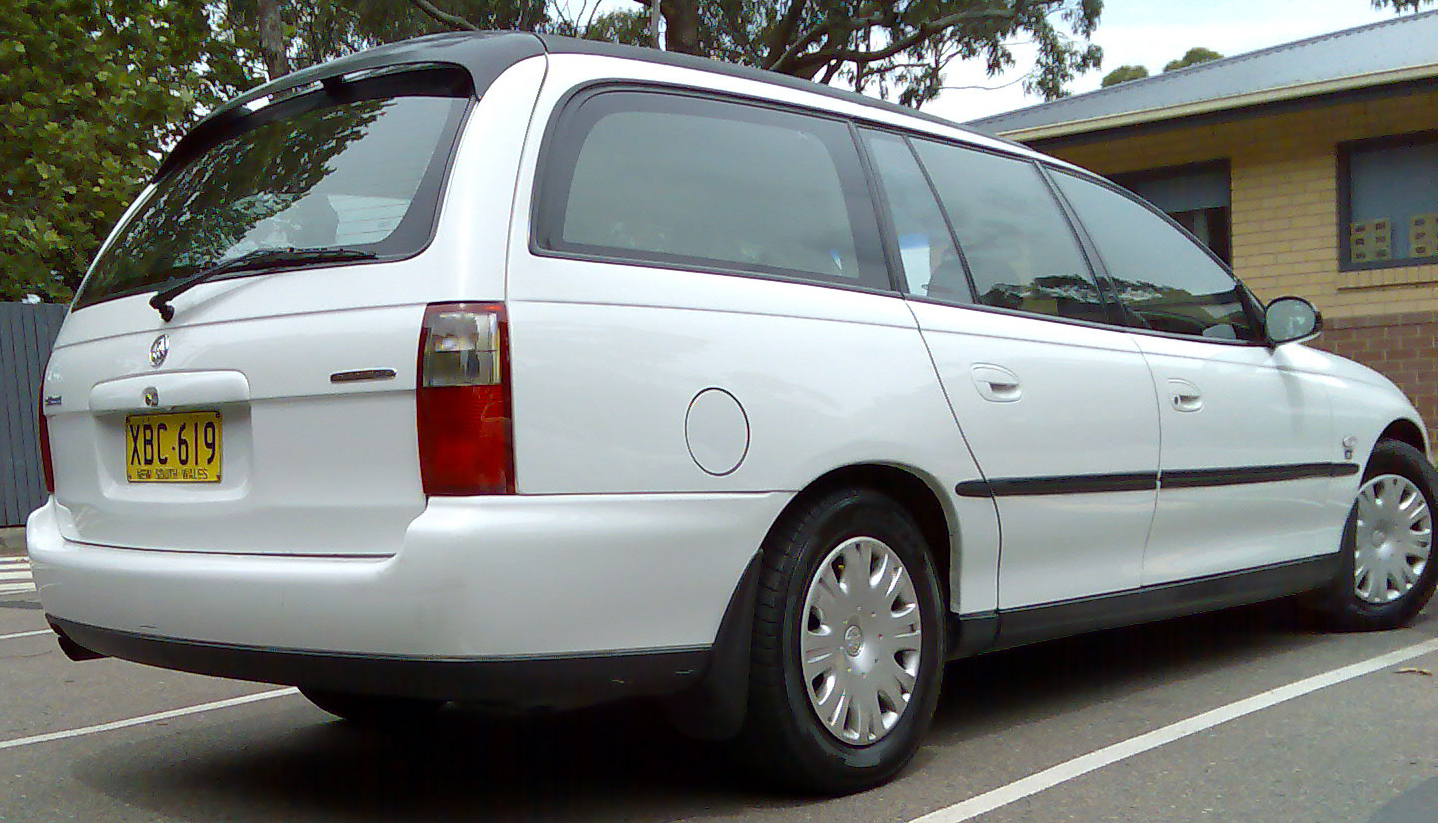
Station Wagon (Executive; Series 1)

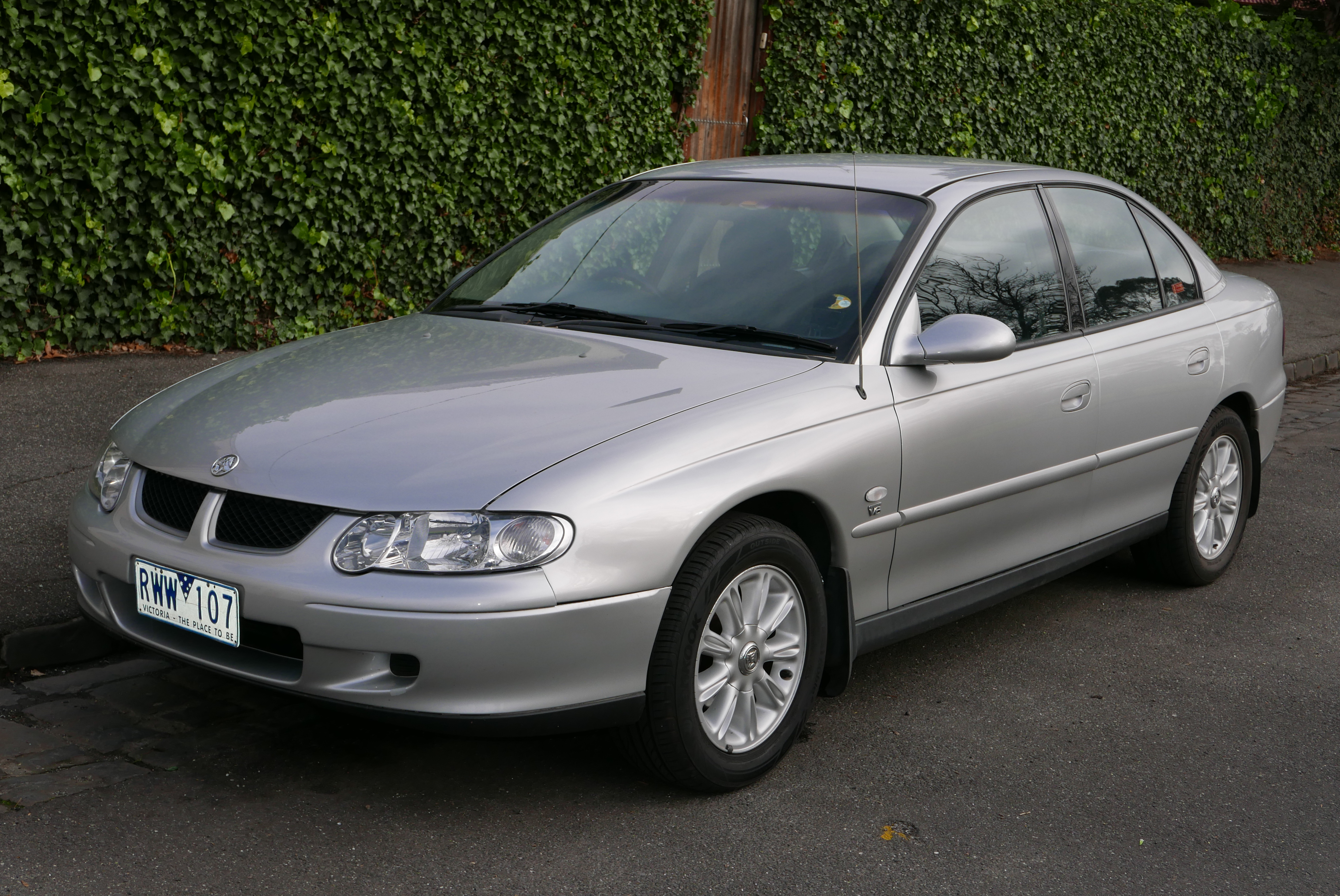
Sedan (Equipe; Series 2)

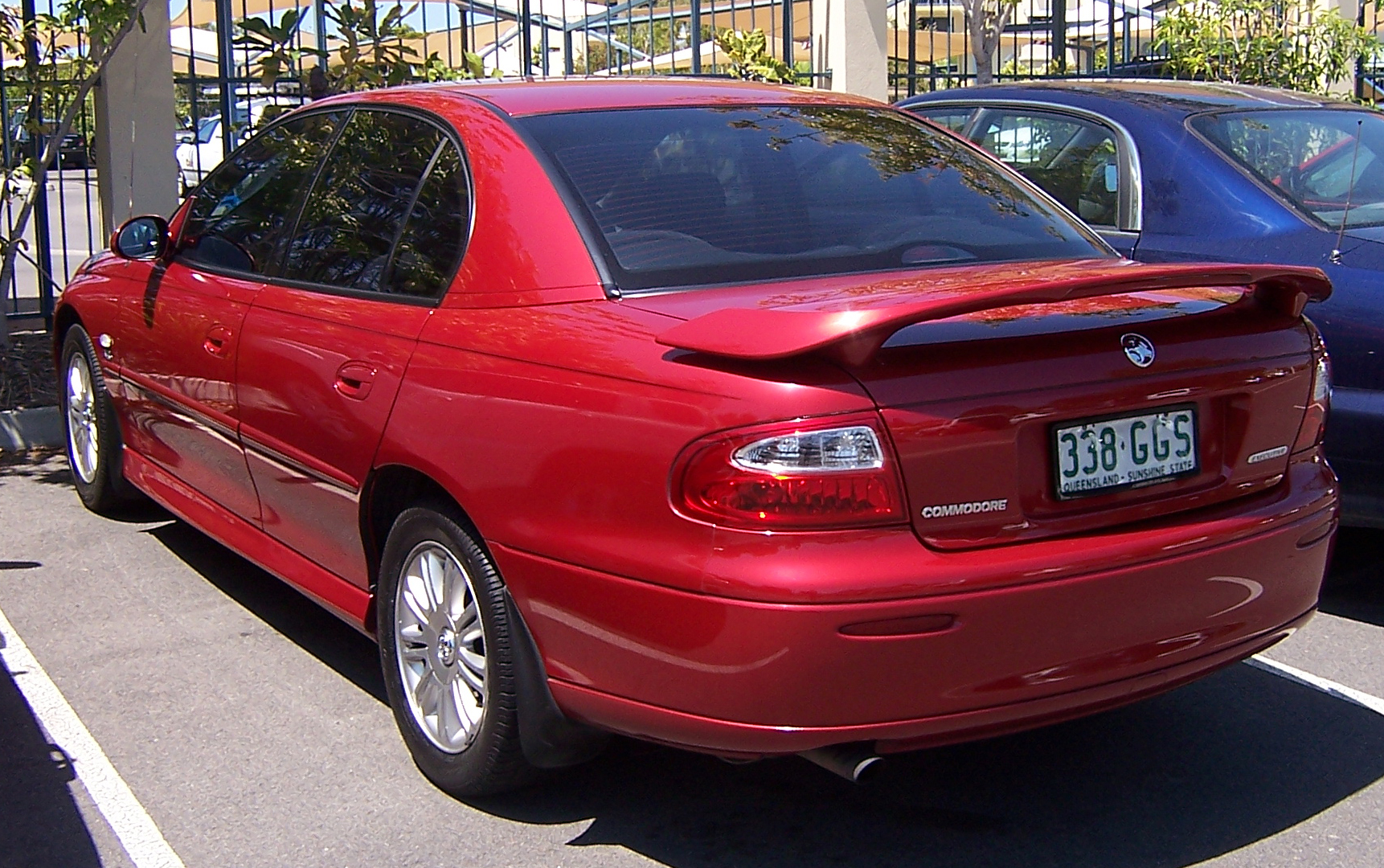
Sedan (Lumina; Series 2)

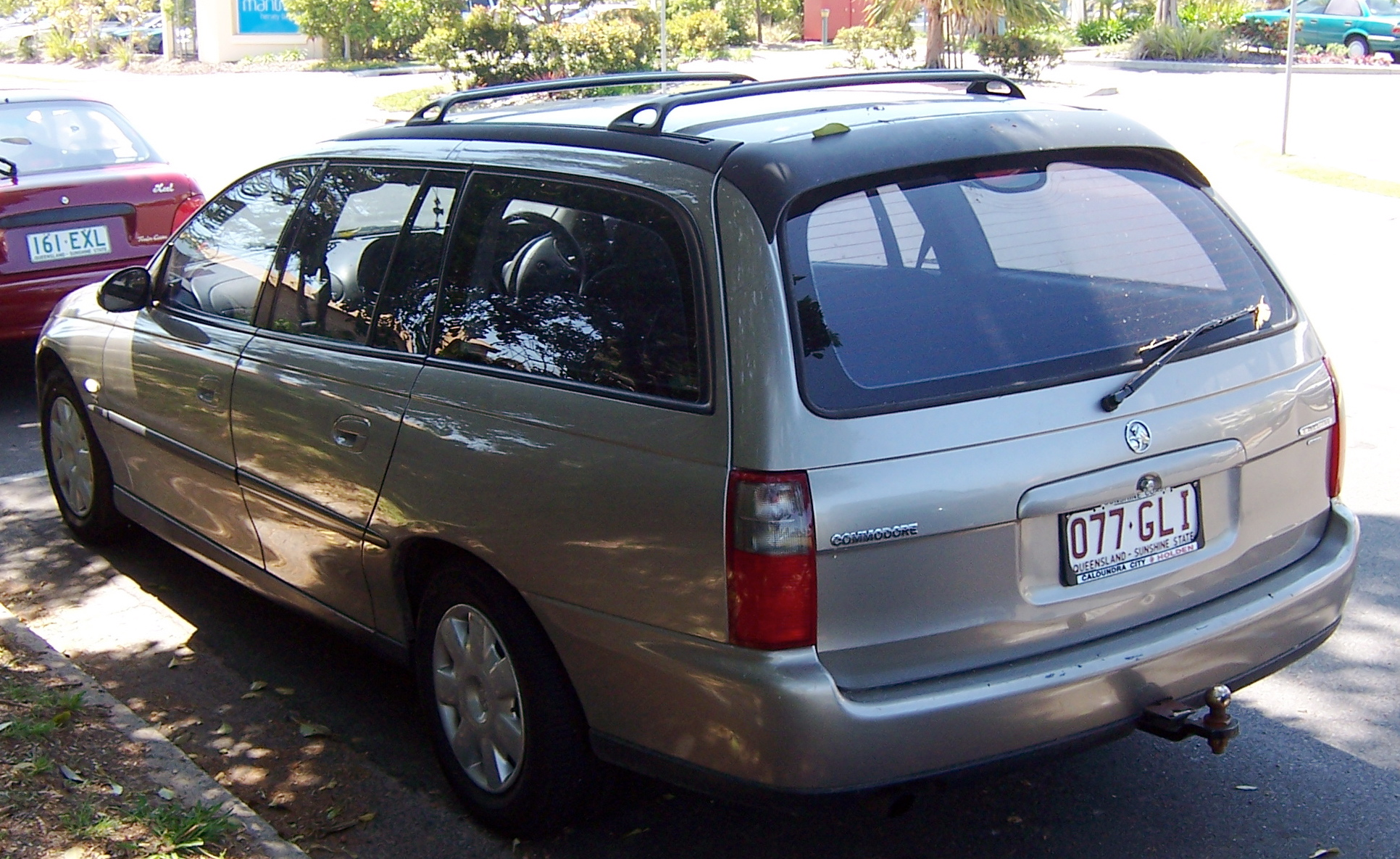
Station Wagon (Executive; Series 2)

=== VY (2002–2004) ===
The A$250 million VY mid-cycle update of 2002 represented the first major styling shift since the 1997 VT. Designers discarded the rounded front and rear styling of the VT and VX models, adopting more aggressive, angular lines. The same approach was applied to the interior, whereby the curvaceous dashboard design was orphaned in favour of an angular, symmetrical design. Satin chrome plastic now dominated the façade of the centre console stack, and high-end models received fold-out cup holders borrowed from fellow GM subsidiary Saab. Leaving Eurovox behind, Holden turned towards German electronics manufacturer Blaupunkt to source audio systems, an arrangement that remained in place until the end of the Holden brand.

Engineering wise, Holden kept the changes low key. A revised steering system and tweaked suspension tuning were among some of the changes to sharpen handling precision. Further improvements were made to the Generation III V8 engine to produce peak power of 235 kW (315 hp) for sports variants. In a bid to recapture the market for low-cost, high-performance cars, Holden created a new SV8 specification level. Based on the entry-level Executive, the SV8 inherited the V8 mechanical package from the SS but made do without the luxury appointments and was sold at a correspondingly lower price. Holden also experimented by releasing a limited edition wagon version of its high-performance SS variant, of which only 850 were built. The Series II update added a front strut bar as standard to the SS, which was claimed to increase rigidity and hence handling. As became the trend, the update raised V8 power, now up 10 kW (13 hp). Amendments in the remaining models were confined to new wheels, trims and decals, however, the Calais has taken on a sports-luxury persona as opposed to the discrete luxury character seen in previous models. This repositioning in turn affected the Berlina's standing. The once second-tier model now became the sole luxury model, only overshadowed by the more expensive Calais. Coinciding with the VY II models was the first four-door utility model dubbed the Holden Crewman. Crewman's underpinnings and body structure while somewhat unusual, shared a fair amount in common with the Statesman/Caprice, One tonner and the two-door Ute.

In 2003, Holden launched an AWD system that it developed for the VY platform dubbed Cross Trac, at a cost of A$125 million. Unveiled after the Series II updates, the first application of this electronically controlled system was the Holden Adventra, a raised VY wagon crossover. The system was only available in combination with the V8 and automatic transmission. Holden chose not to spend extra engineering resources on adapting the AWD system to the 3.8-litre V6, due to be replaced in the upcoming VZ model. Unfortunately for Holden, the Adventra fell well short of expected sales, despite modest targets.

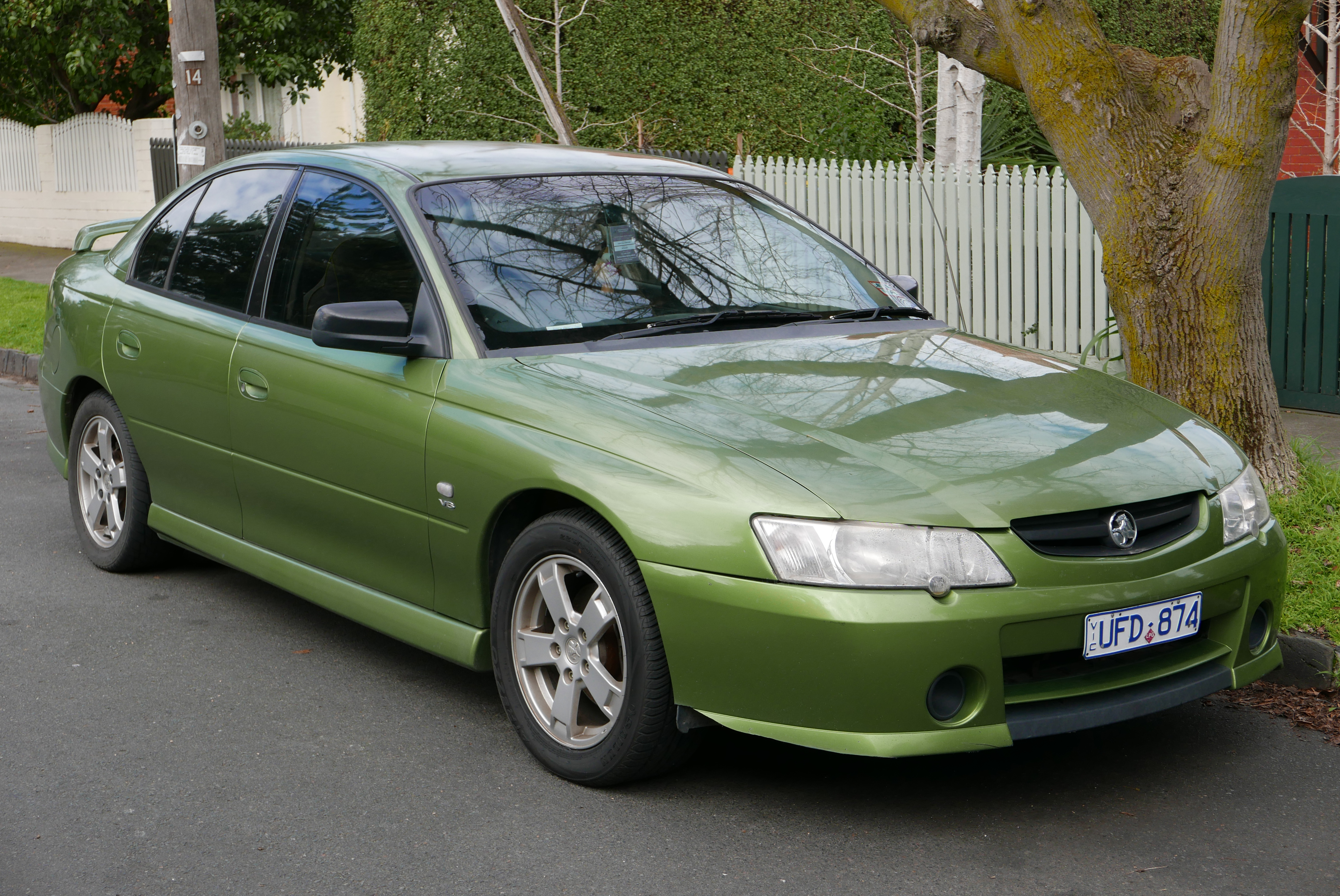
Sedan (S; series 1)

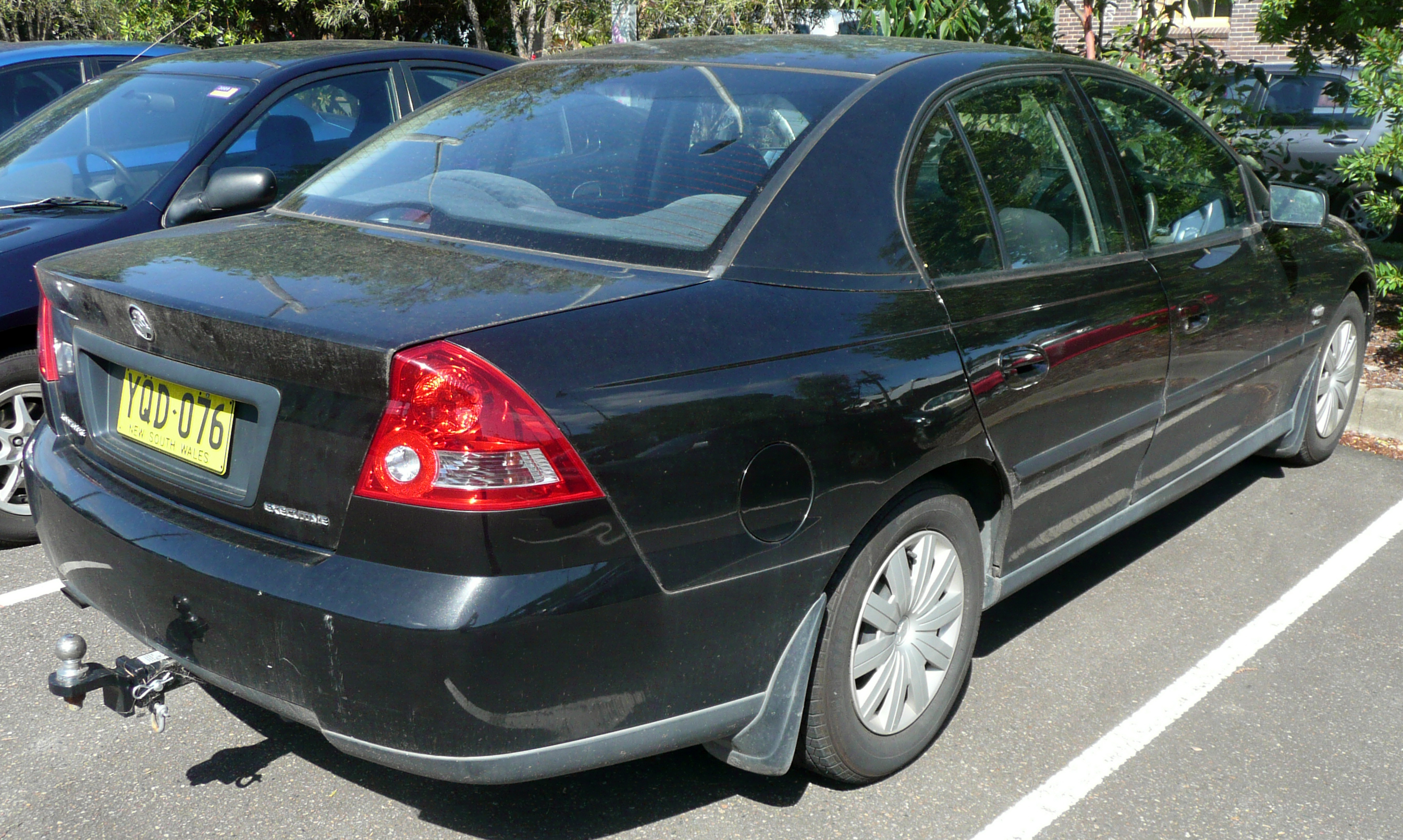
Sedan (Executive; series 1)

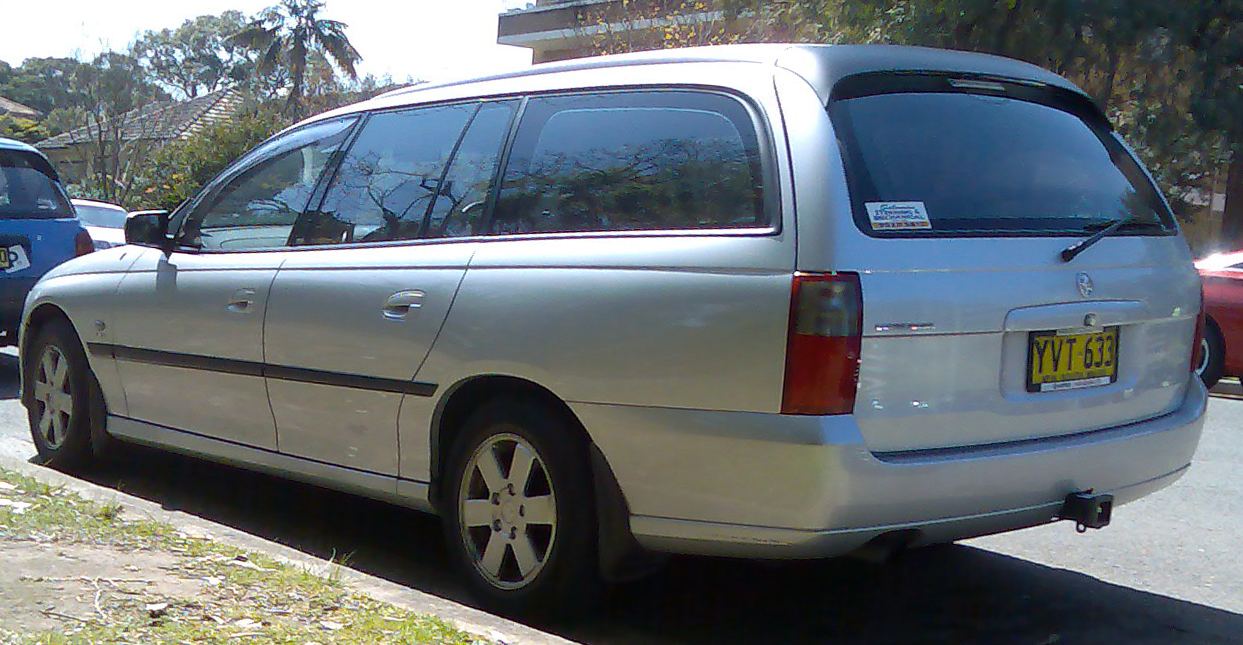
Station Wagon (Acclaim; series 1)

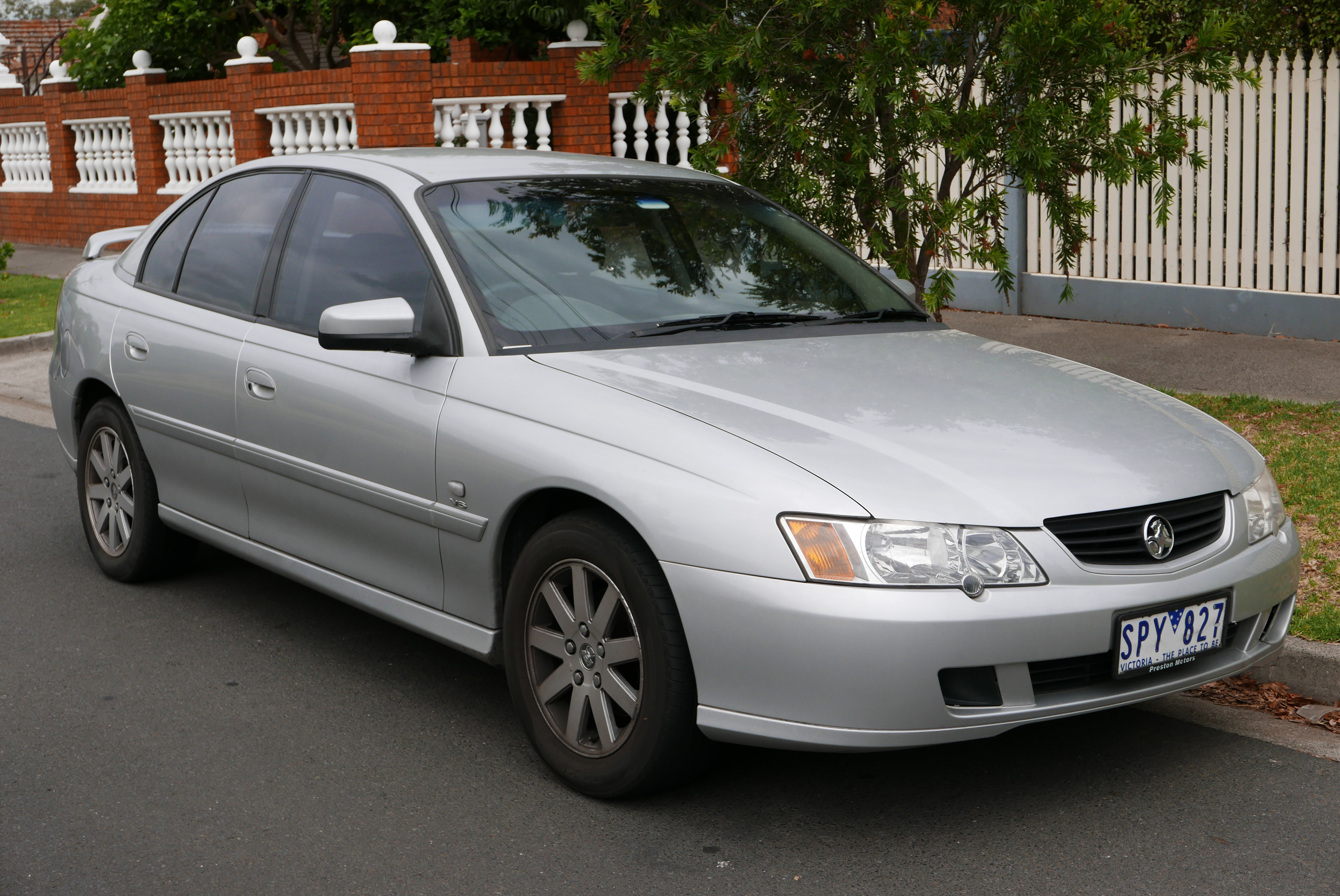
Sedan (25th Anniversary; series 2)

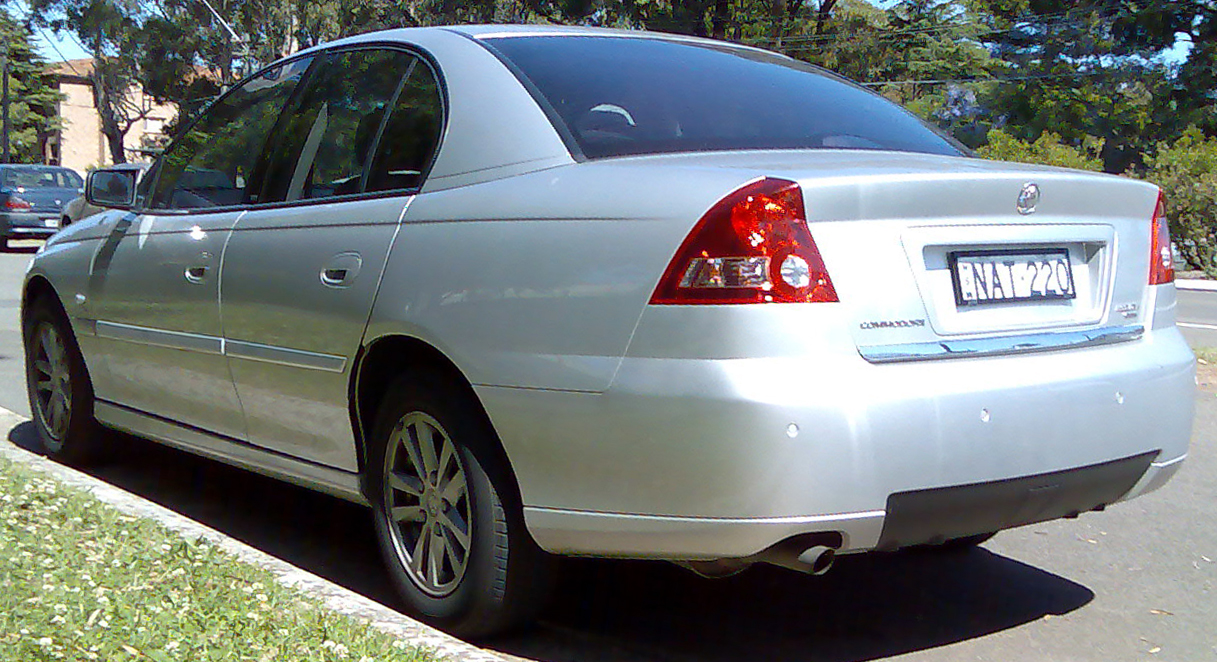
Sedan (Acclaim; series 2)

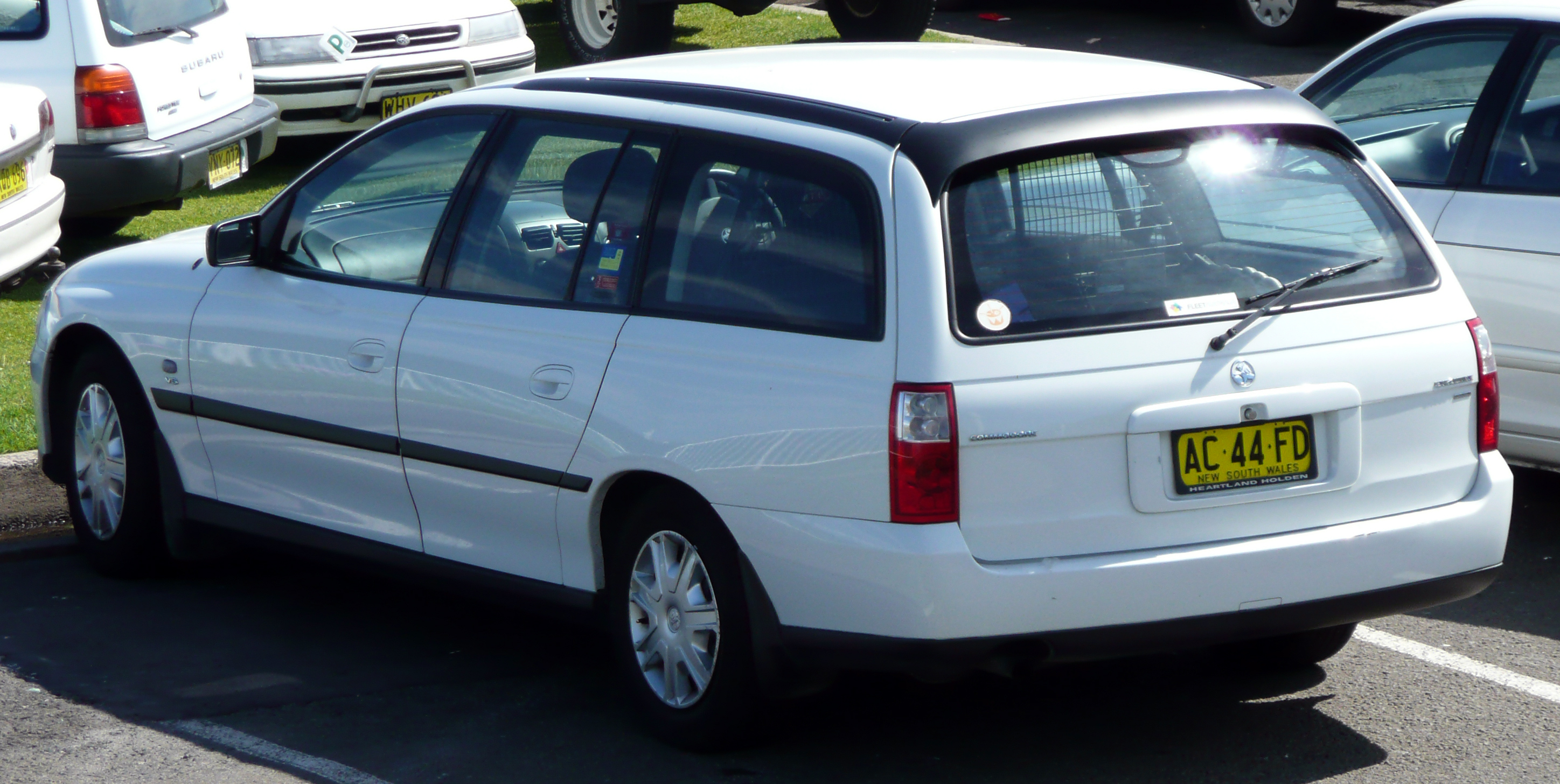
Station Wagon (Executive; series 2)

=== VZ (2004–2007) ===
The final chapter of the third generation series was the VZ Commodore. Debuting in 2004 with a new series of V6 engines known as the Alloytec V6, both 175 kW (235 hp) and 190 kW (255 hp) versions of the 3.6-litre engine were offered. These were later upgraded to 180 and 195 kW (241 and 261 hp) respectively in the VE model. When compared to the previous Ecotec engines, the Alloytec benefits from increased power output, responsiveness and fuel efficiency. The new engines were mated to a new five-speed 5L40E automatic transmission on the luxury V6 variants, and a new six-speed Aisin AY6 manual transmission on the six-cylinder SV6 sports variant. However, the long serving four-speed automatic carried on in other variants, albeit with further tweaks in an attempt to address complaints about refinement. A new 6.0-litre Generation 4 V8 engine was added to the range in January 2006 to comply with Euro III emission standards. Compared to the American version, both Active Fuel Management and variable valve timing were removed. The Alloytec V6 was also affected by the new standards, which saw the peak output reduced to 172 kW (231 hp).

Along with the new powertrain, Holden also introduced new safety features such as electronic stability control and brake assist. The Used Car Safety Ratings evaluation found that VT/VX Commodores provide a "better than average" level of occupant protection in the event of an accident, with VY/VZ models uprated to "significantly better than average". ANCAP crash test results rate the fourth generation VE lower in the offset frontal impact test than the third generation VY/VZ Commodore. The overall crash score was marginally higher than the outgoing model due to improved side impact protection.

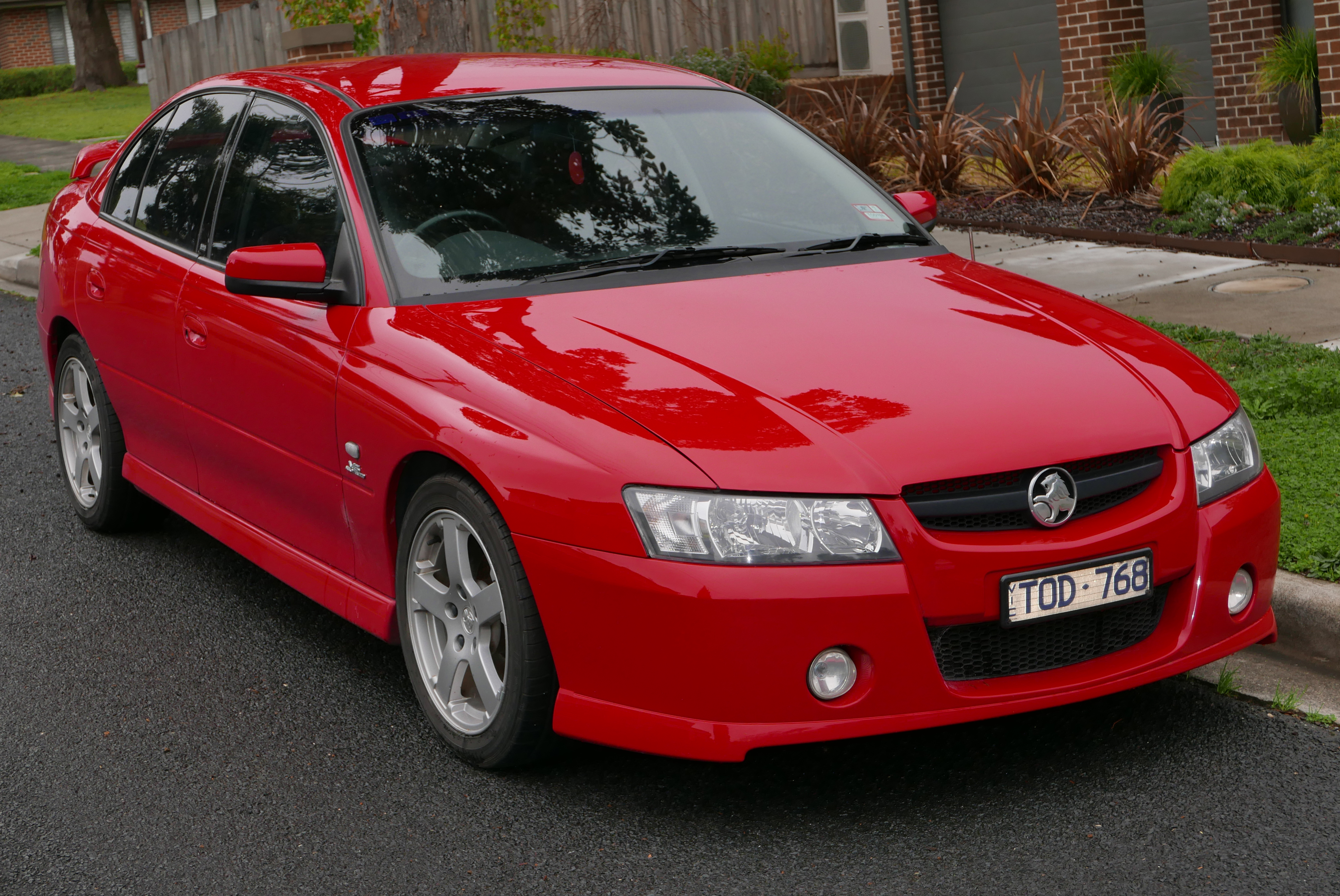
Sedan (SV6)

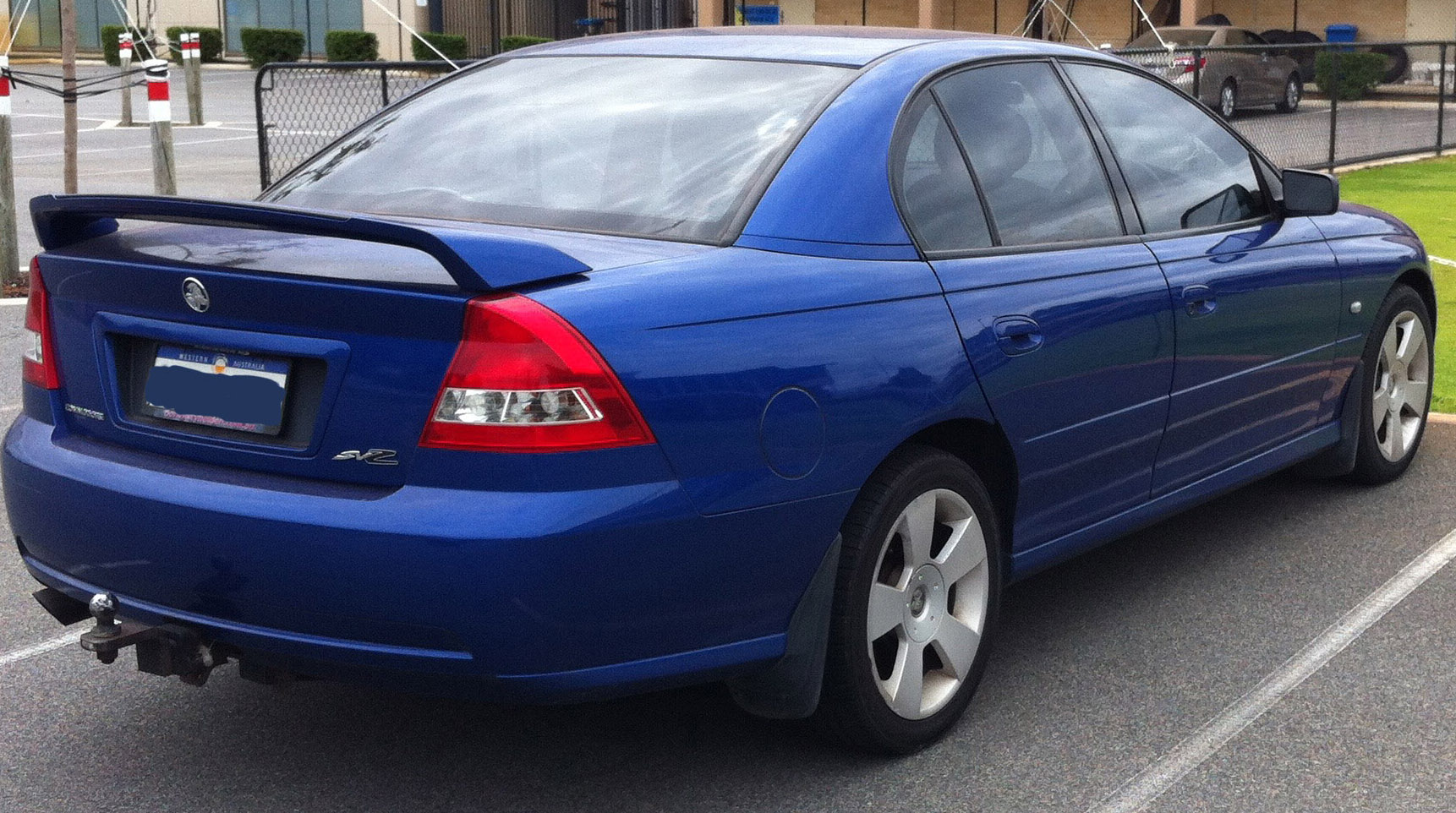
Sedan (SVZ)

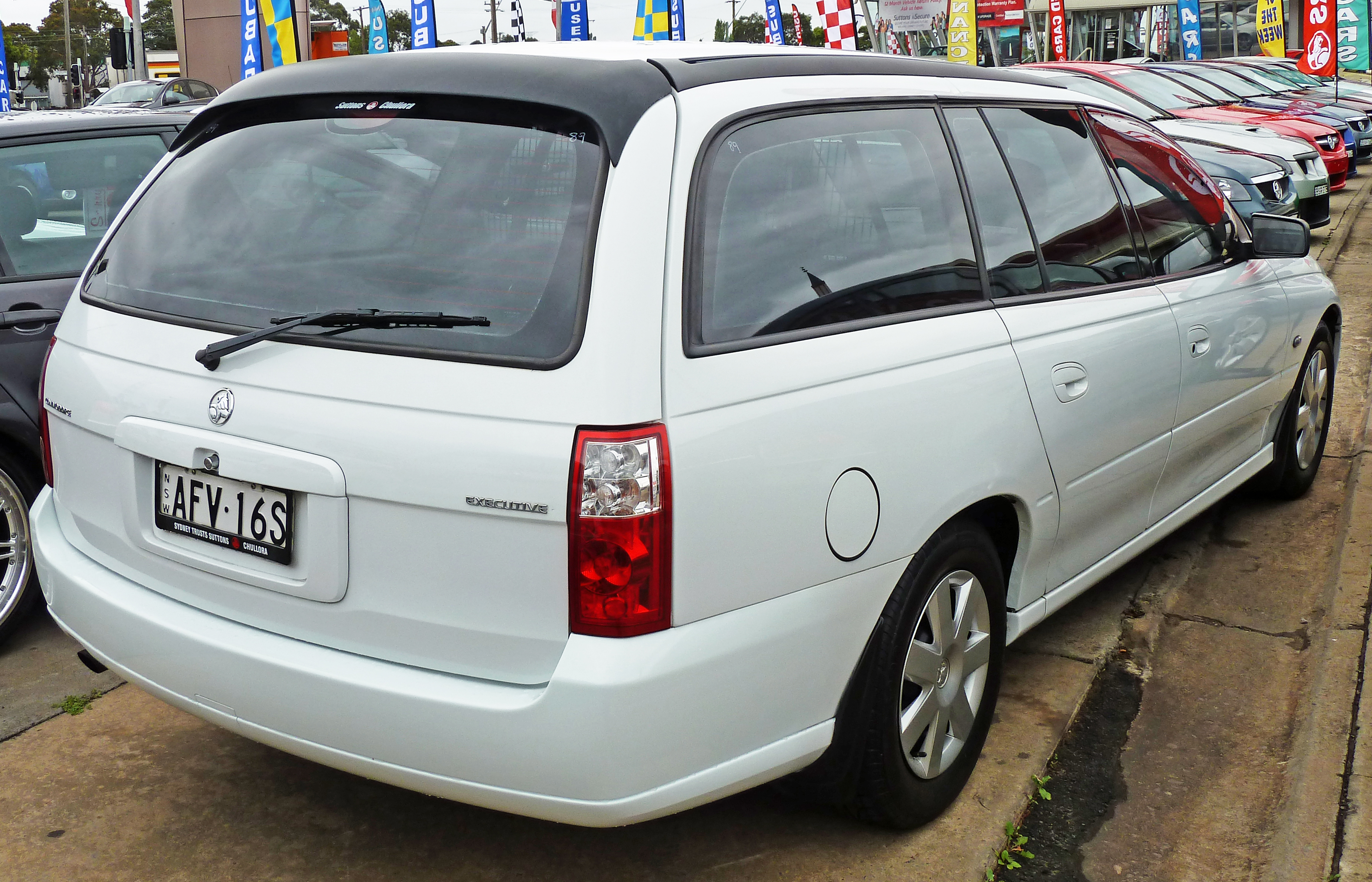
Station Wagon (Executive)

== Fourth generation (2006–2017) ==
=== VE (2006–2013) ===
Launched in 2006 after GM's 2003 abandonment of their last European rear-drive sedan, the Opel Omega, the VE is the first Commodore model designed entirely in Australia, as opposed to being based on an adapted Opel-sourced platform. Given this and high public expectations of quality, the budget in developing the car reportedly exceeded A$1 billion. Underpinned by the new Holden developed GM Zeta platform, the VE features more sophisticated independent suspension all round and near-even 50:50 weight distribution, leading to improved handling. Engines and transmissions are largely carried over from the previous VZ model. However, a new six-speed GM 6L80-E automatic transmission was introduced for V8 variants, replacing the original four-speed automatic now relegated to base models. The design of this new model included innovative features to help minimise export costs, such as a symmetrical centre console that houses a flush-fitting hand brake lever to facilitate its conversion to left-hand drive. Internationally, the Commodore is again badge engineered as the Chevrolet Lumina and Chevrolet Omega, along with its new export market in the United States as the Pontiac G8 (discontinued as of 2010 along with the Pontiac brand).

Variants by Holden's performance arm, HSV, were released soon after the sedan's debut, followed by the long-wheelbase WM Statesman/Caprice models. The VE Ute did not enter production until 2007 whilst the Sportwagon began production in July 2008. A VE V8 Calais was awarded Wheels Car of the Year, being the fifth Commodore/Calais model to do so.

In late 2008 Holden made changes to the VE Commodore, including the addition of a passenger seatbelt-reminder system. The rollout of such modifications allowed the VE range to be upgraded in stages (dependent on model) to the five-star ANCAP safety rating during 2008 and 2009.

The September 2009 MY10 update to the VE Commodore platform introduces a new standard engine–a 3.0-litre Spark Ignition Direct Injection (SIDI) V6 on the Omega and Berlina, with a 3.6-litre version of the same reserved for all other V6 variants. The standard transmission is now a six-speed GM 6L50 automatic, replacing the four-speed in Omega and Berlina models and the five-speed in higher luxury levels. A six-speed manual is still available in sport models. Holden claims the newer powertrains would provide better fuel economy than some smaller four-cylinder cars; the 3.0-litre version is rated at 9.3 L/100 km (25 mpg_{‑US}; 30 mpg_{‑imp}). The 3.0L produces 190 kW (255 hp), more than the earlier 3.6L and more than the old 5.0L Holden V8. The new 3.6 produces a fraction more at 210 kW (282 hp) although the difference is negligible in real world driving.

In mid-2010 Holden released the VE Series 2 (VEII). The major difference saw the introduction of the Holden iQ system, a centre-mounted LCD screen that provides navigation, Bluetooth, and controls to the stereo. There were also small alterations to the styling and a number of other changes.

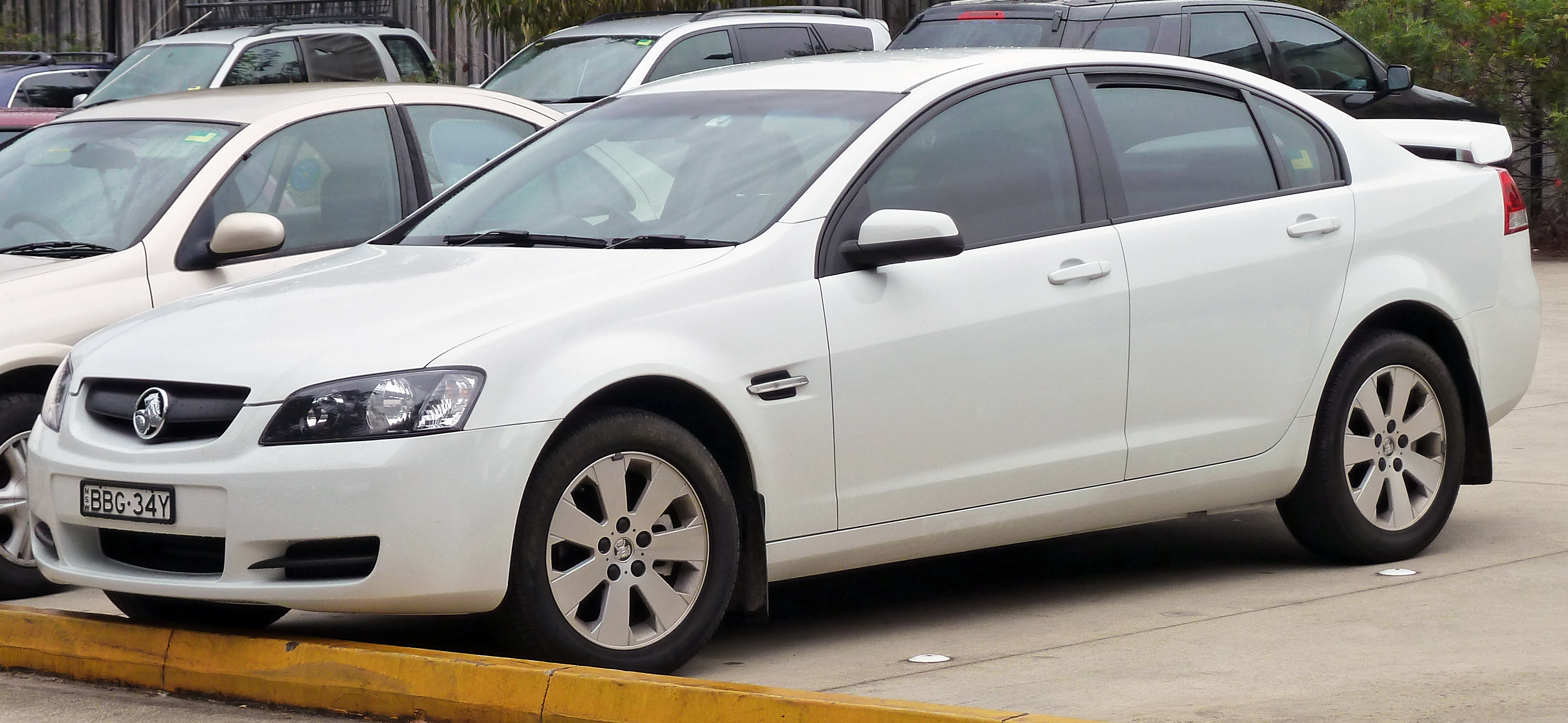
Sedan (V, Series 1)

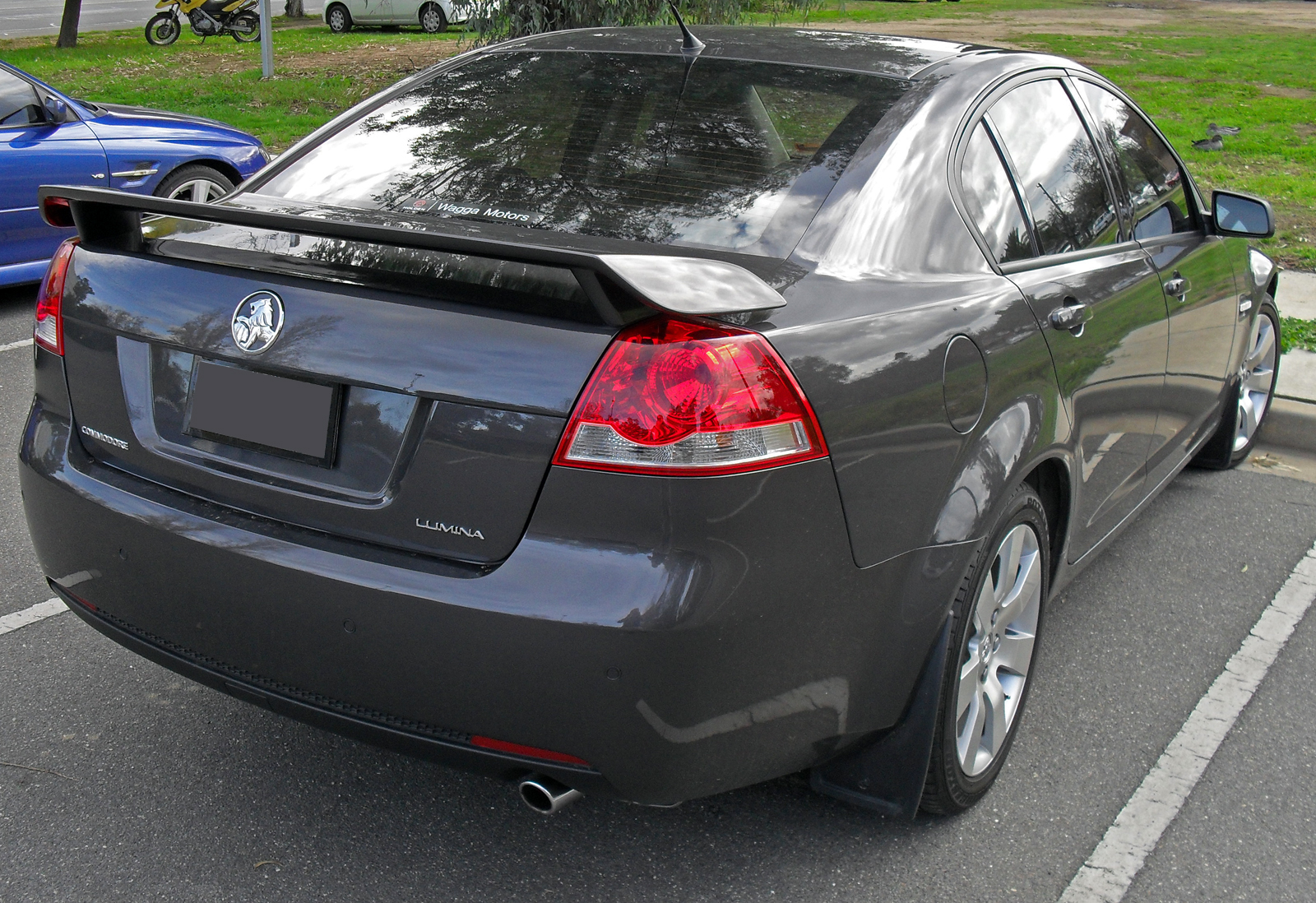
Sedan (Lumina, Series 1)

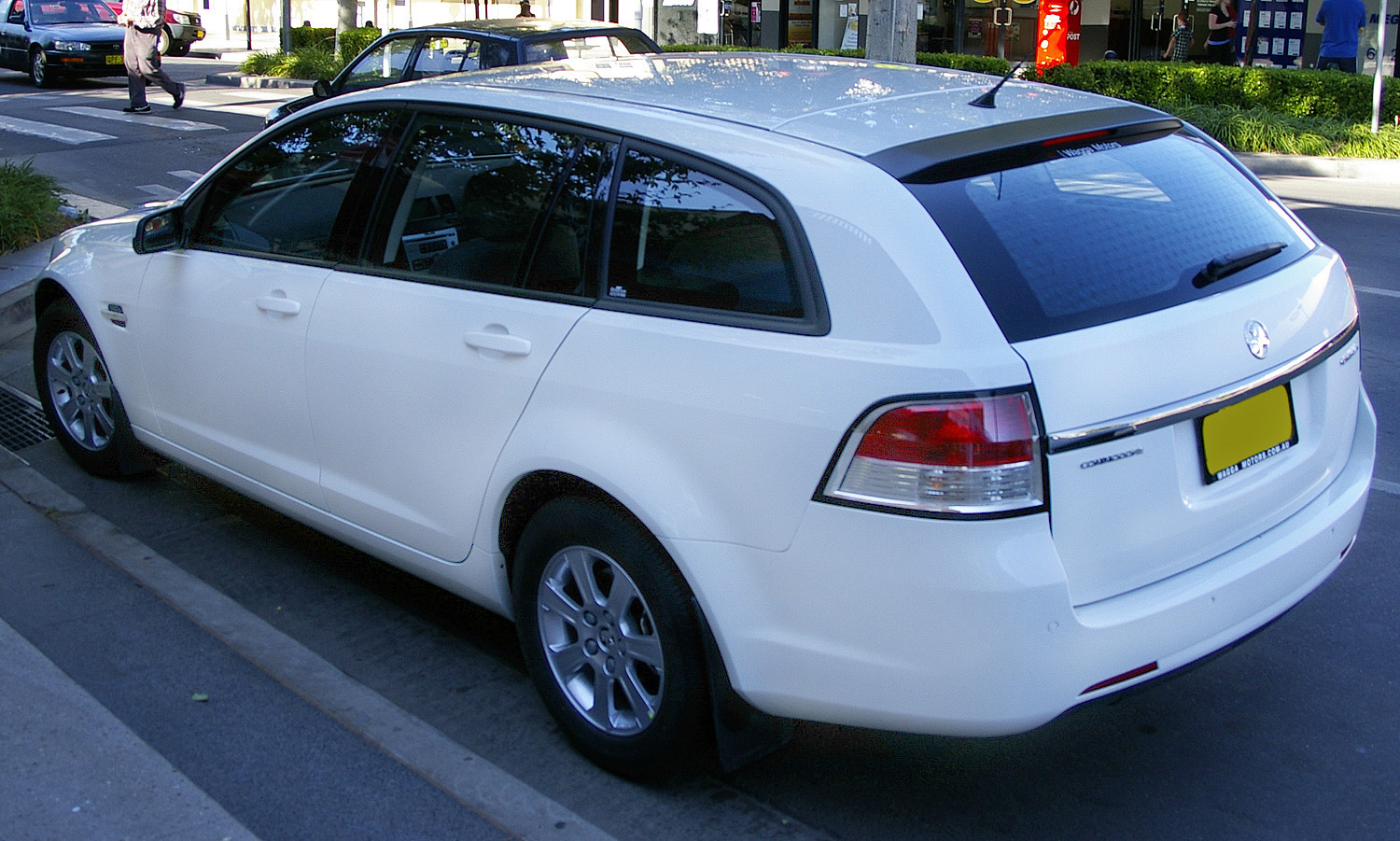
Sportswagon (Omega, Series 1)

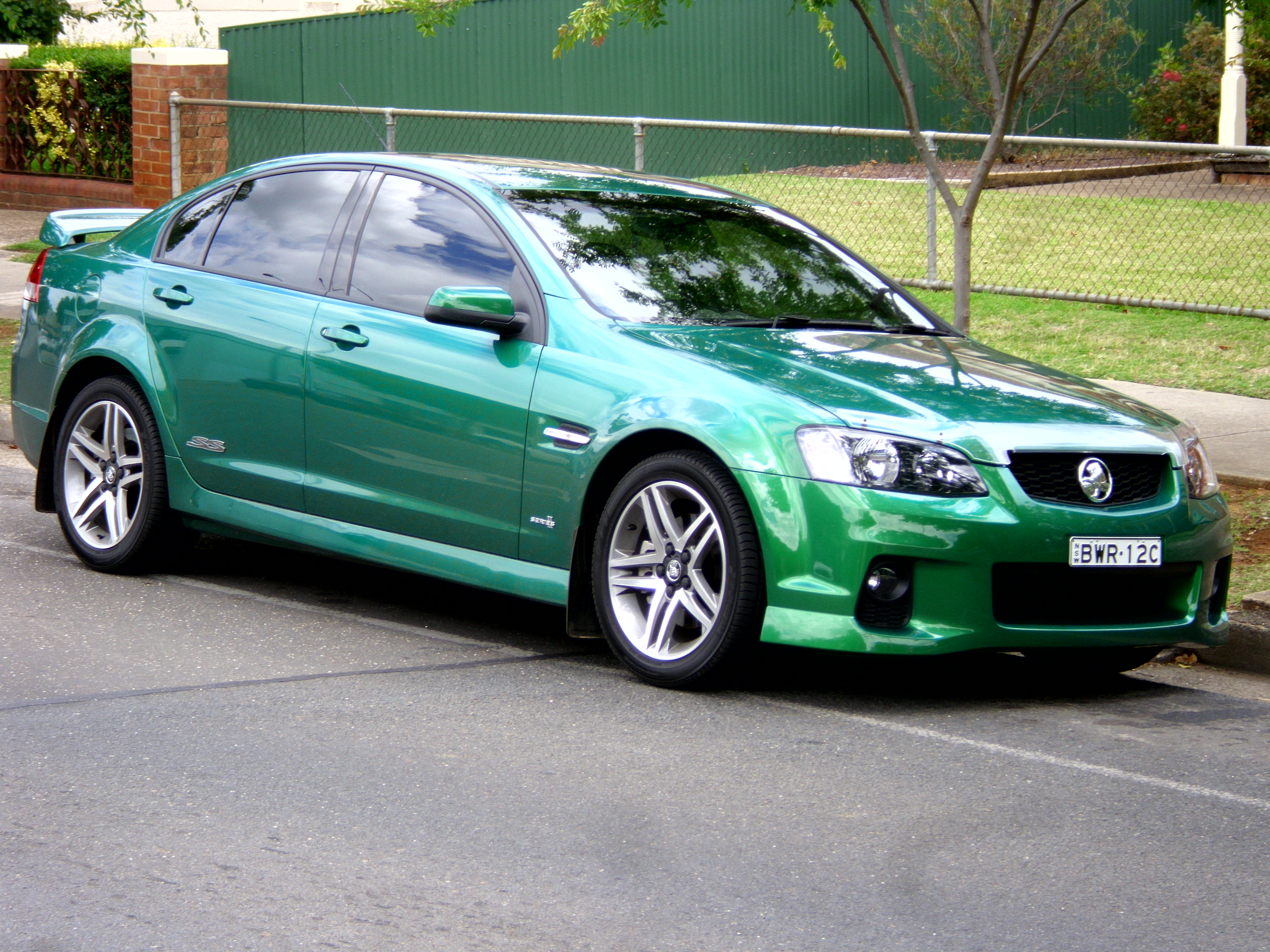
Sedan (SS, Series 2)

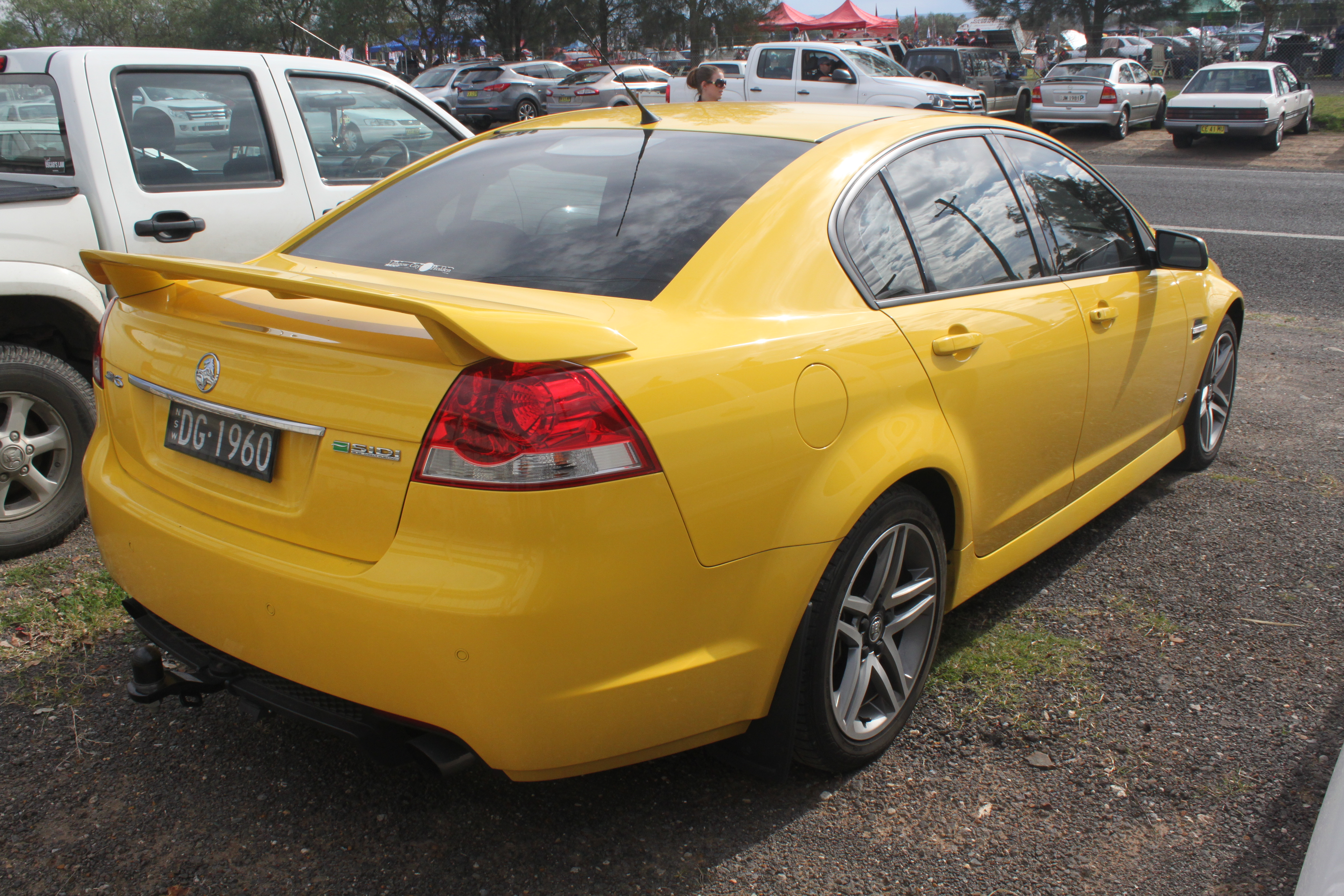
Sedan (SV6, Series 2)

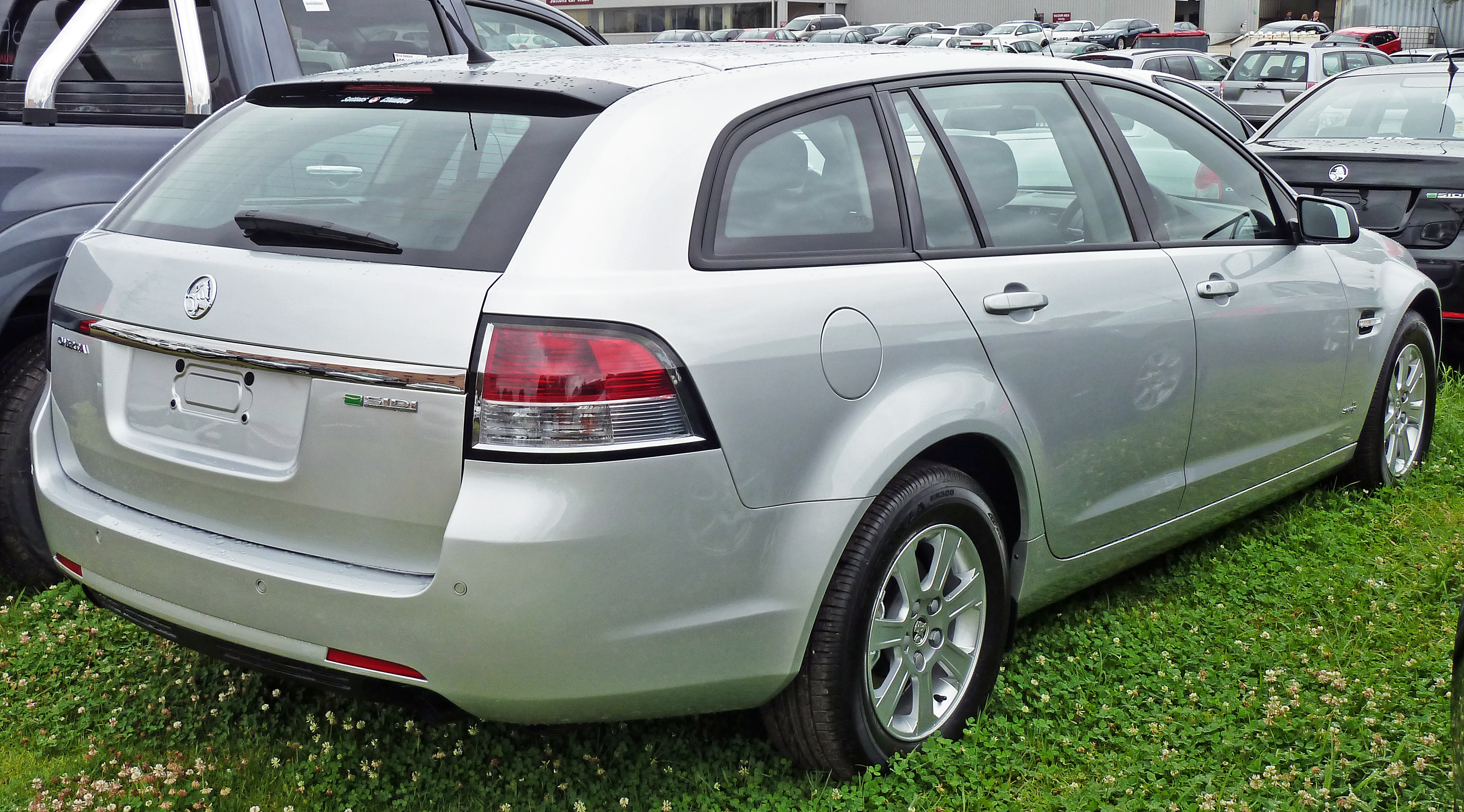
Sportswagon (Omega, Series 2)

=== VF (2013–2017) ===
The VF Commodore, a major overhaul of the VE, was officially revealed on 10 February 2013 in Melbourne.

The body shell, suspension and electrics of the GM Zeta platform were thoroughly reworked to reduce weight, improving handling and fuel efficiency. Changes to the model line-up saw the deletion of the Berlina nameplate (which was merged with the standard Calais variant, represented the smallest share of sales in Commodore's line-up) and the base model renamed from Omega to Evoke.

Standard features across the Commodore range includes front and rear parking sensors, reverse camera and auto park assist, whereas high specifications models such as the Calais-V and SS-V redline models also feature, as standard, forward and reverse collision alert system and a colour heads-up display - all possible thanks to the VF's electronics now being compatible with those of more developed GM cars, resulting in the new Commodore being cheaper to manufacture. Indeed, the recommended retail pricing was substantially reduced across the range, from A$5,000 for the base model and up to A$10,000 for the Calais V V8 and SS V Redline.

A day after the Australian range reveal and in the lead up to the Daytona 500 weekend, a more powerful and better equipped export version of the VF Commodore SS also made its debut in Daytona, Florida, as the MY14 Chevrolet SS. To maximise the SS's profile in the United States, GM also replaced in NASCAR the Chevrolet Impala with the SS, which raced in NASCAR's premier series through 2017, when it was replaced by the Chevrolet Camaro ZL1 for the 2018 season.

A Series II update (VF II) was launched in late 2015, introducing minor styling revisions at the front, while the biggest change was the arrival of a 304 kW (408 hp) LS3 across the entire V8 range. In addition, the V8's final drive ratio and the Redline's suspension tune were also revised.

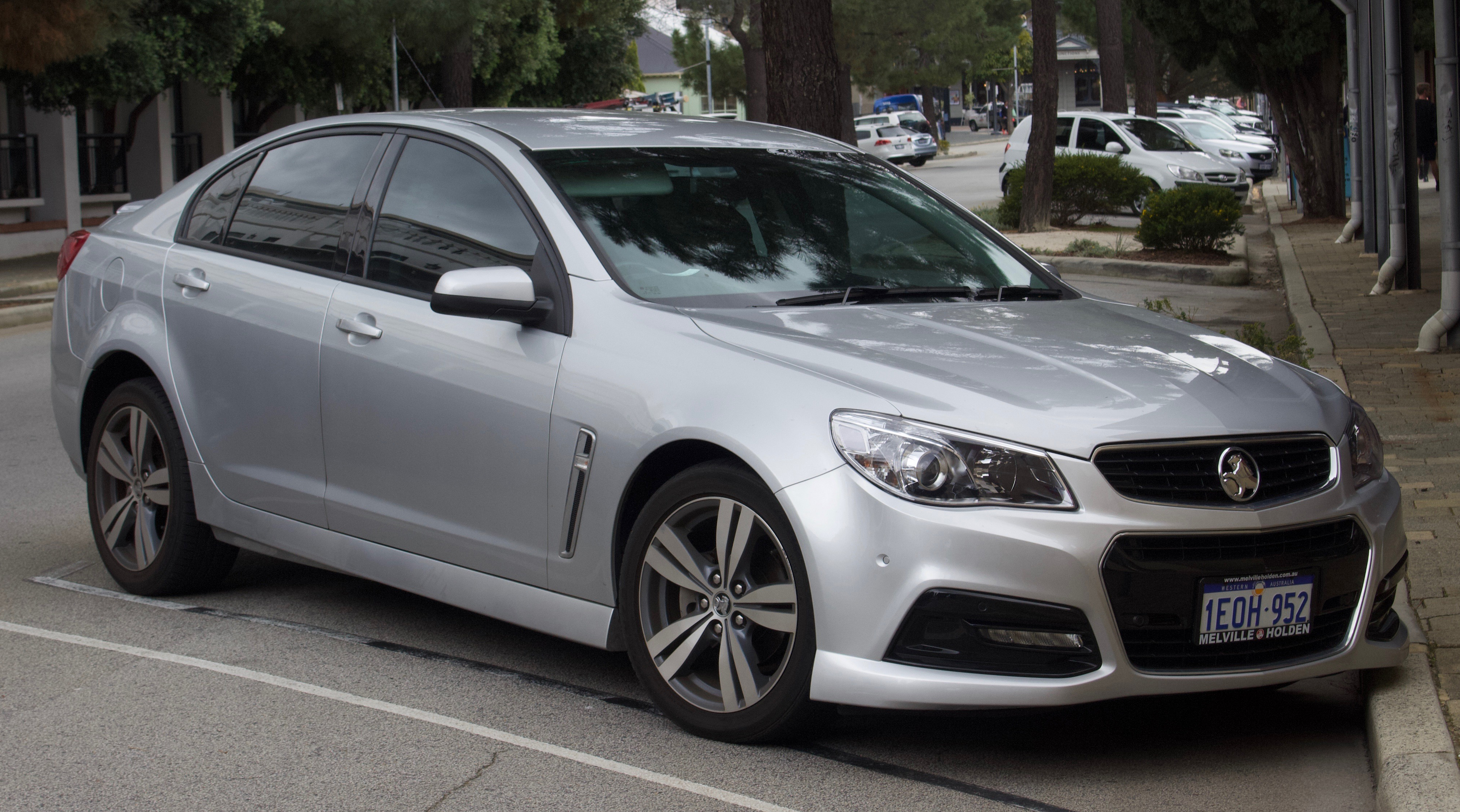
Sedan (SV6, Series 1)

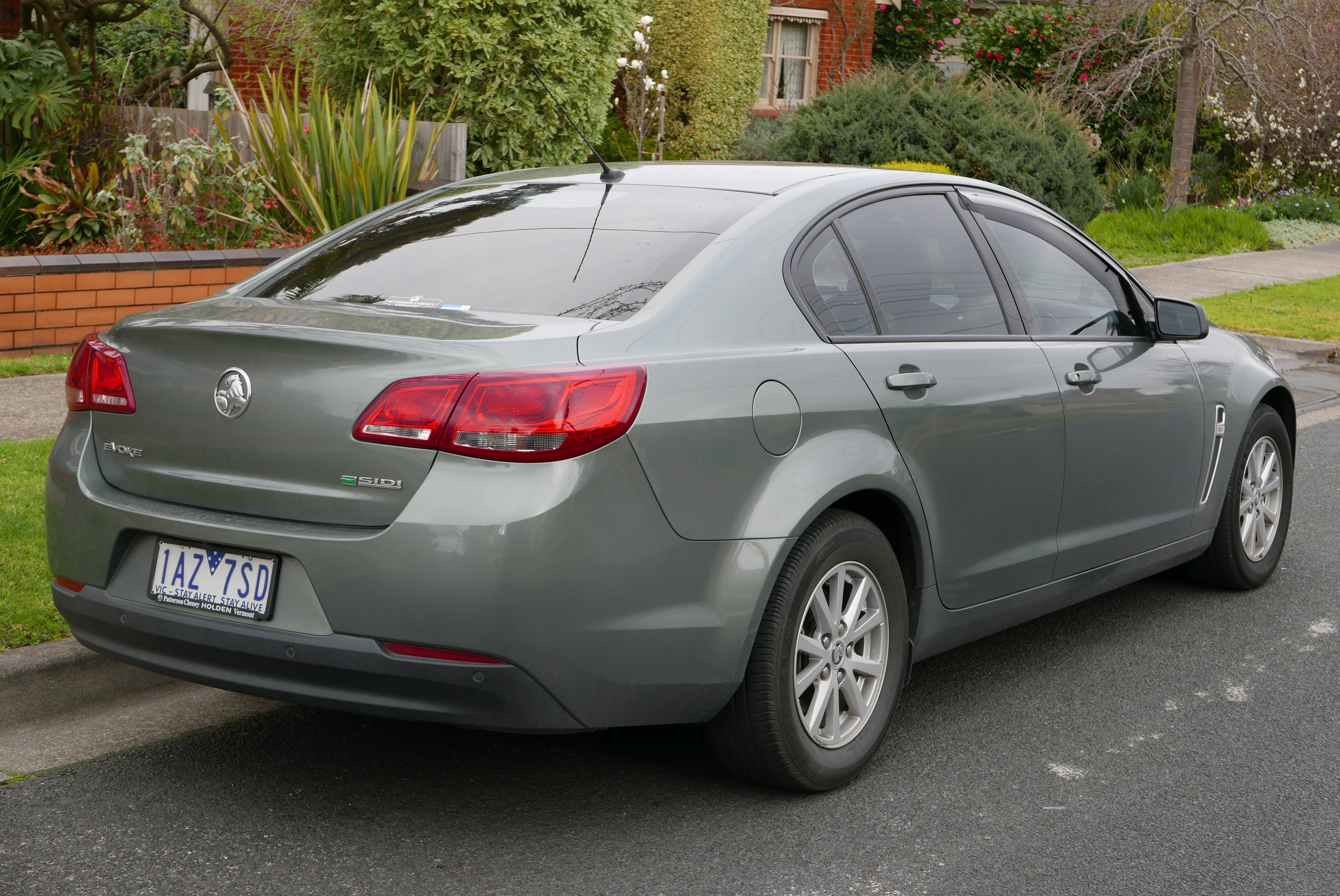
Sedan (Evoke, Series 1)

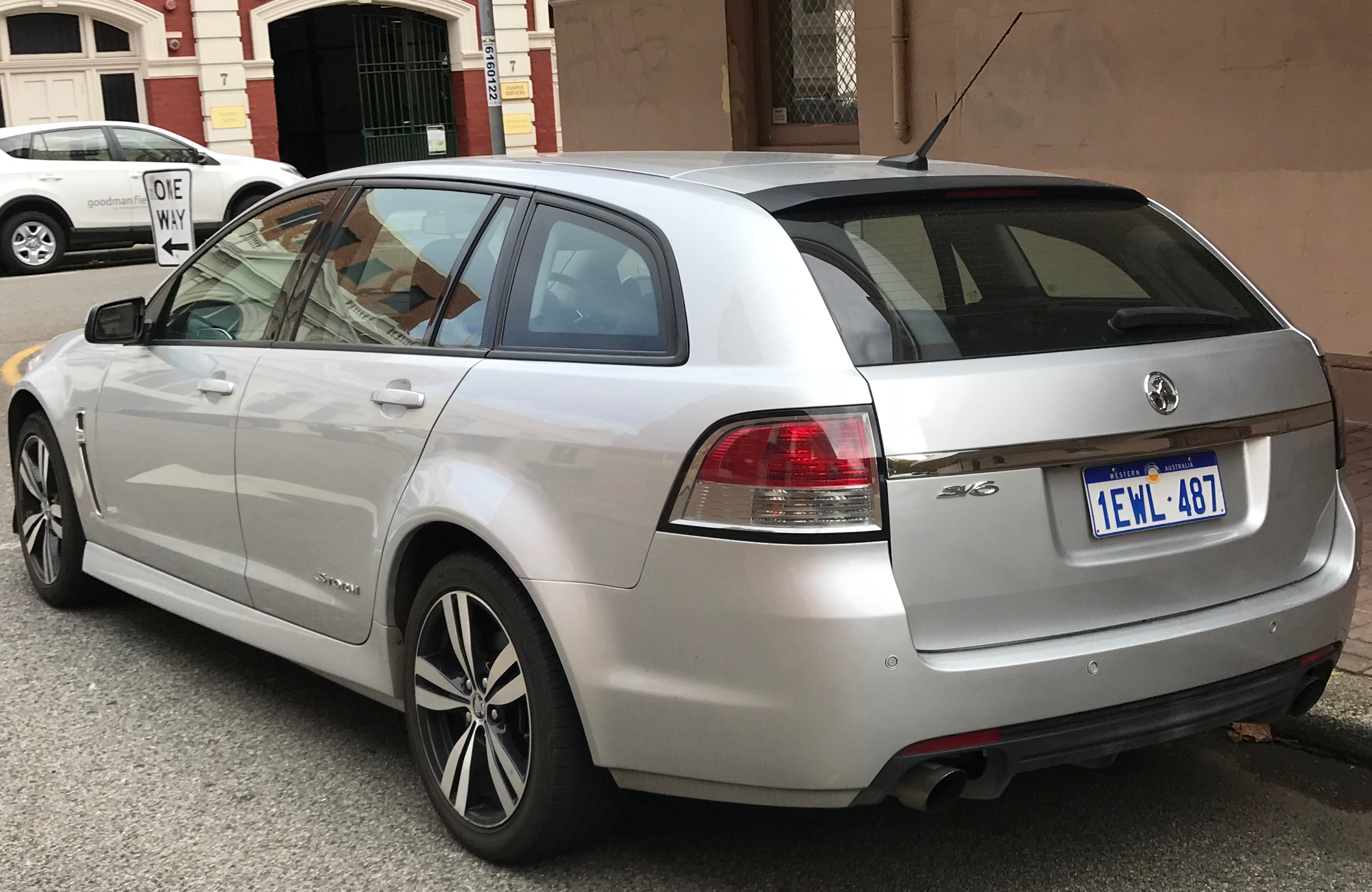
Station Wagon (SV6 Storm, Series 1)

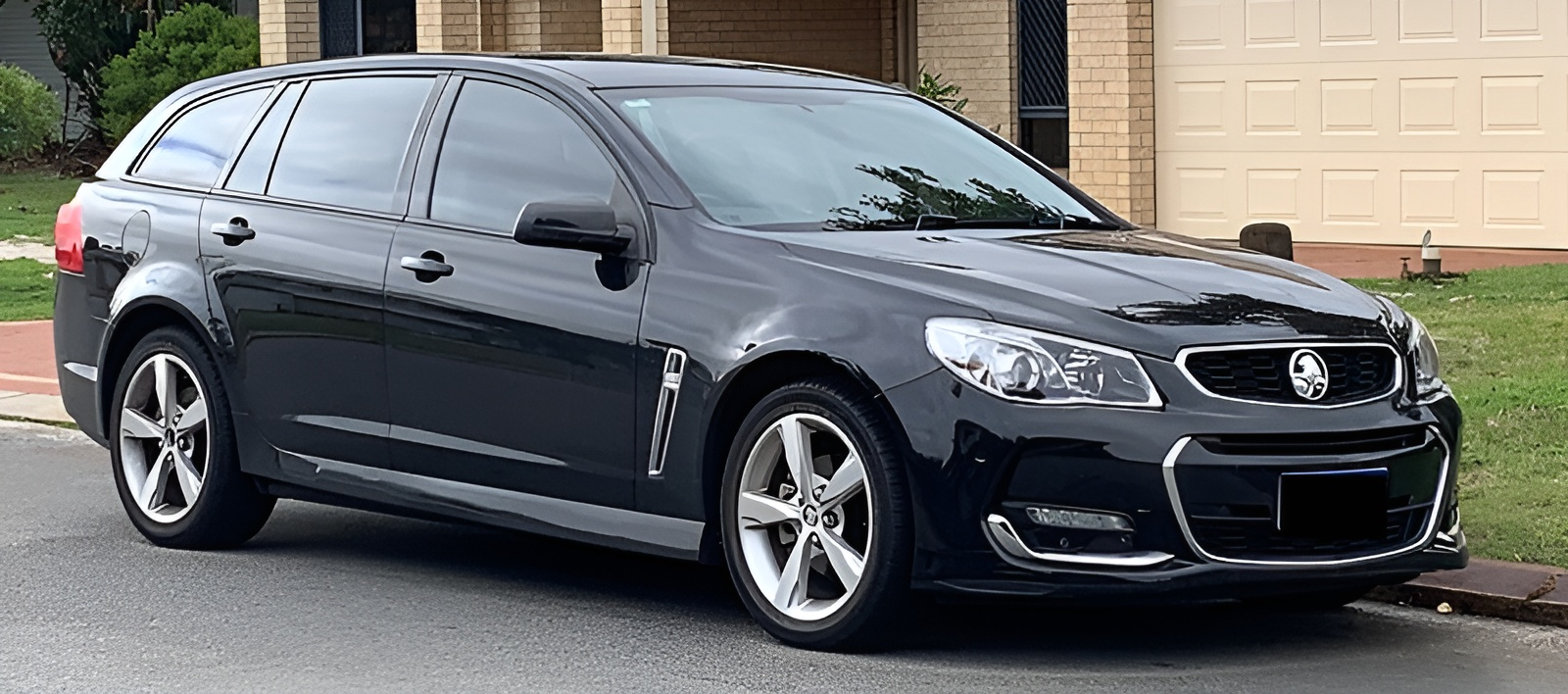
Station Wagon (SV6, Series 2)

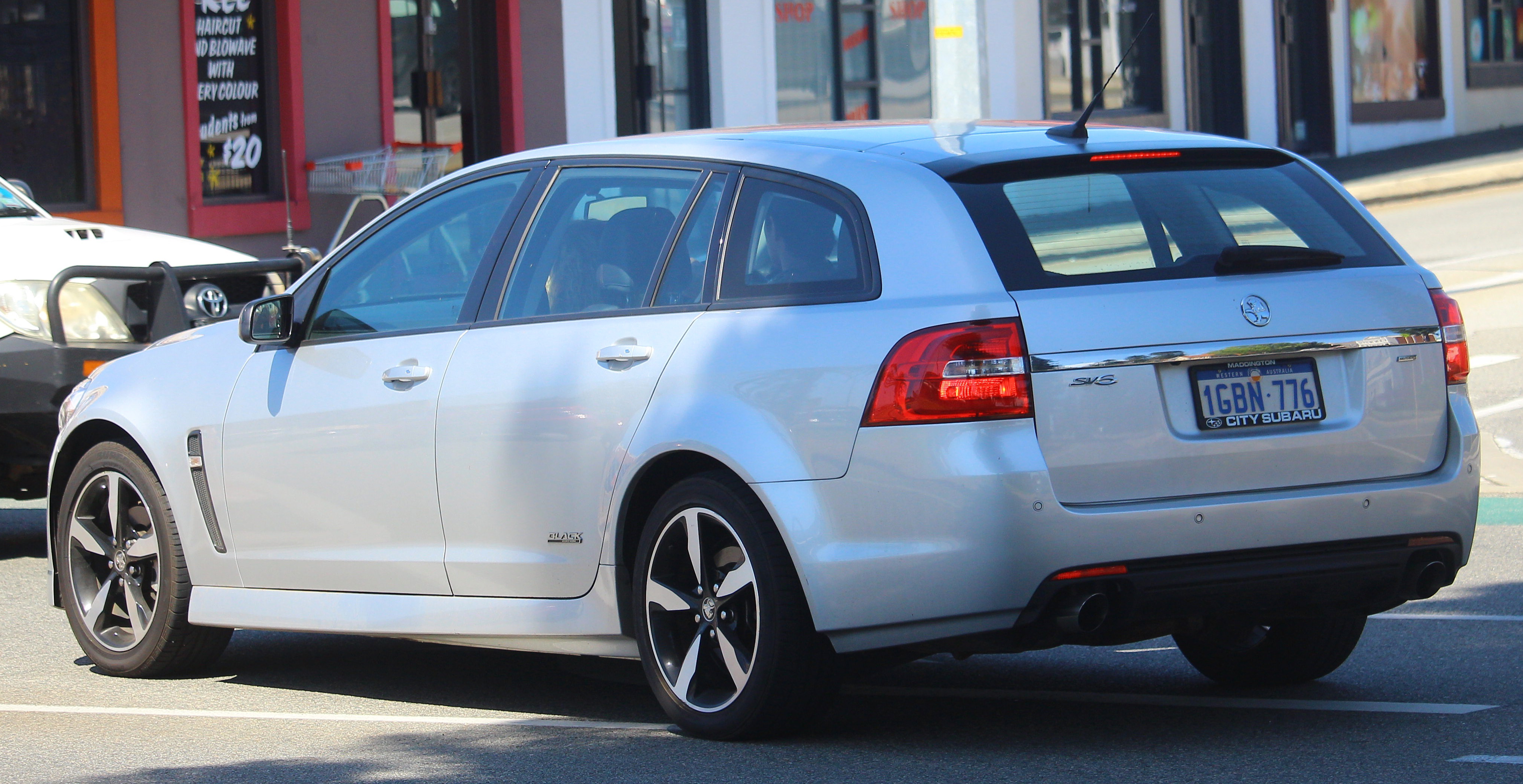
Station Wagon (SV6 Black Edition, Series 2)

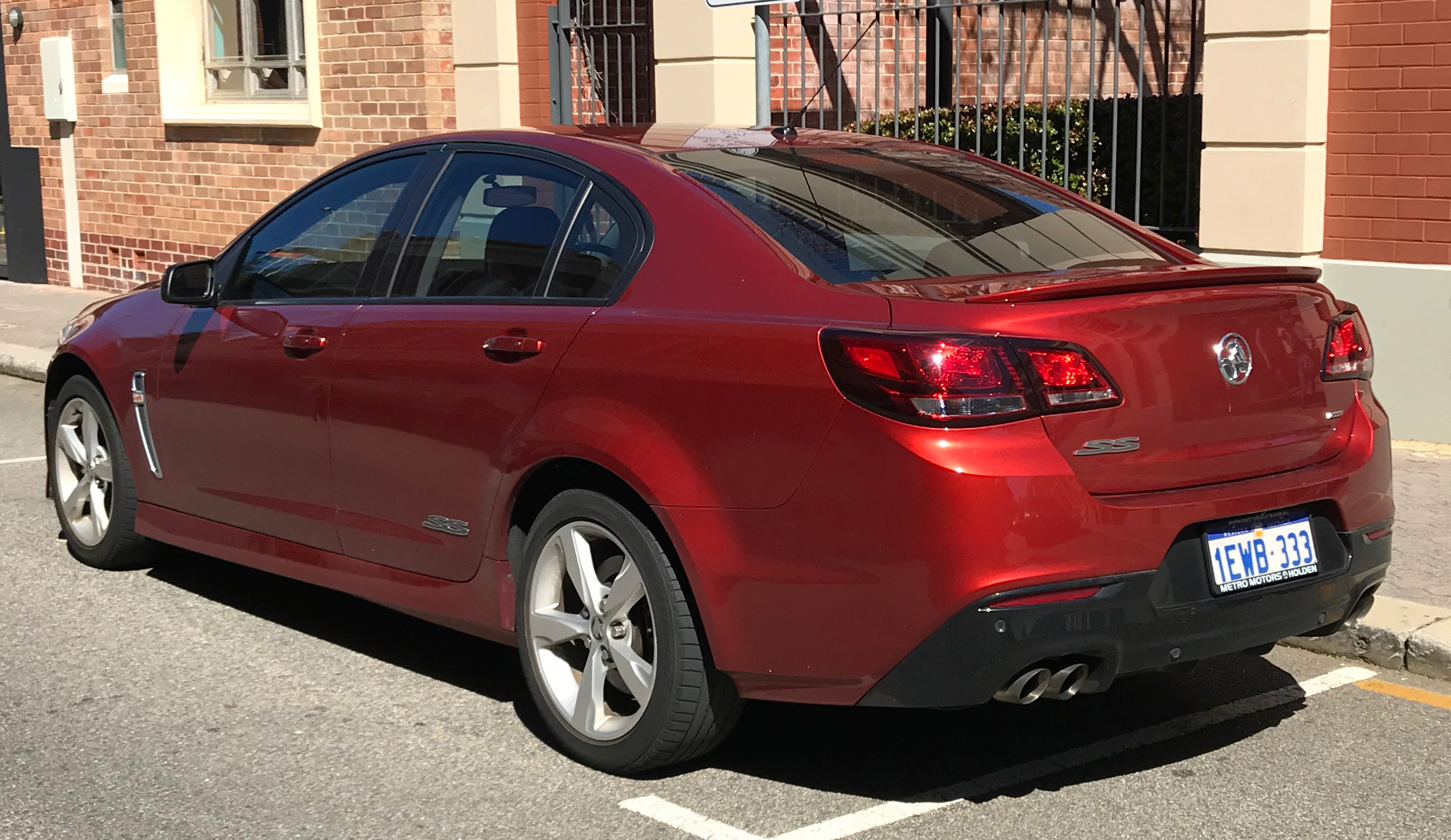
Sedan (SS, Series 2)

== Fifth generation (2018–2020) ==
=== ZB (2018–2020) ===
In 2017, Holden announced that the Commodore would end production in Australia and confirmed that the Commodore badge would be inherited by its replacement – now fully imported. That decision was made on the basis of a survey revealing that a majority of customers were in favour of retaining the long-standing Australian badge, introduced in 1978.

In October 2016, Holden provided selected journalists an opportunity to test drive early prototypes of the 2018 Commodore.

The ZB Commodore was revealed on 6 December 2016, as a re-engineered and overhauled version of the Opel Insignia B. The ZB Commodore was offered with four or six-cylinder engine options, as well as front-wheel drive (FWD) or all-wheel drive. This was a major departure from the V8 and rear-wheel drive variants available on the previous generation Commodore.

There was significant controversy regarding Holden's decision to retain the Commodore name for the 2018 model, despite it being considerably smaller than its predecessor and lacking both the traditional V8 engine and rear-wheel drive configuration. The decision was considered to be a safe choice in order to preserve sales, but the retention of the long-respected Commodore name was criticised for missing the opportunity to re-brand the sedan range and push the vehicle into the more lucrative semi-premium segment of the market.

As of April 2018, the ZB Commodore had the lowest resale value, as a proportion of its new price, of any car on the Australian market.

Due to slow sales and Holden's interest in other vehicle segments, it was announced on 10 December 2019 that the ZB Commodore would be discontinued in early 2020, shortly before GM's decision to retire the Holden brand entirely.

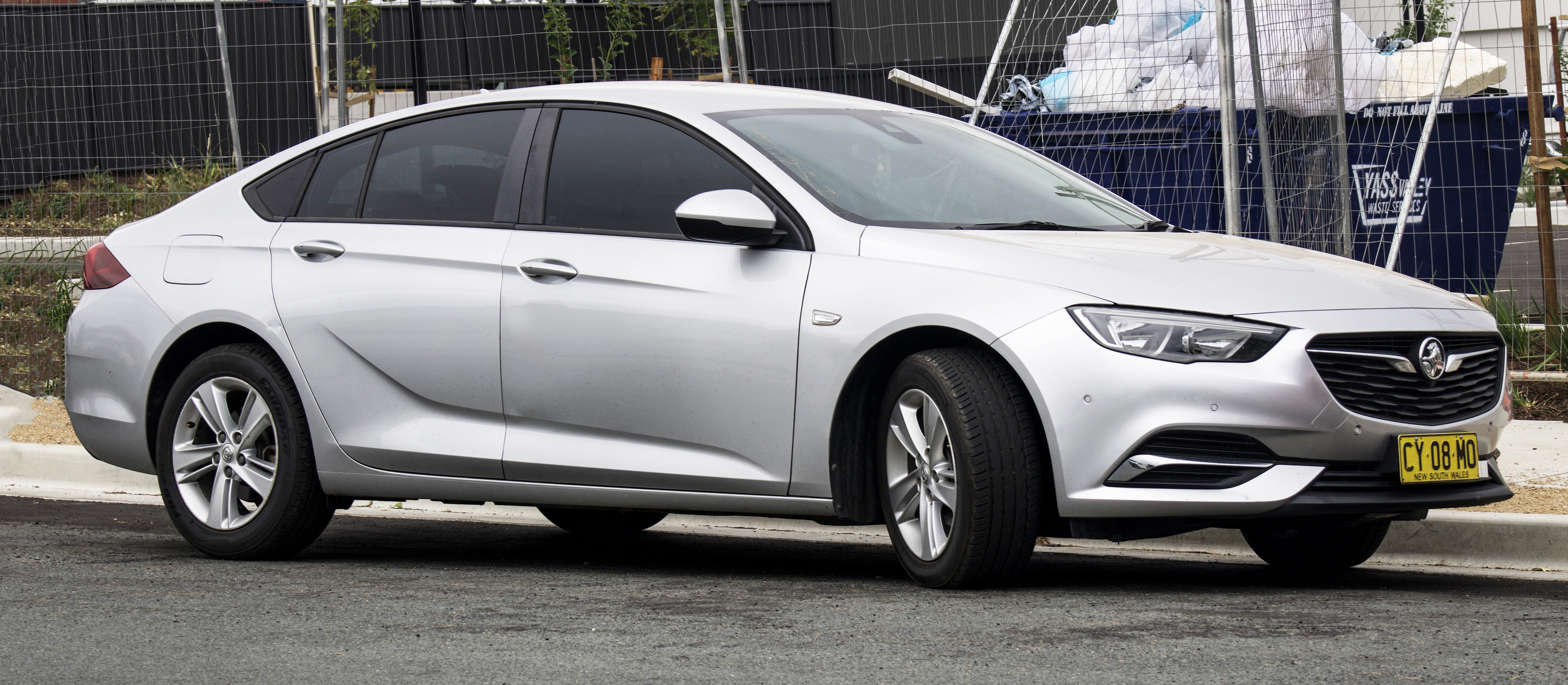
Commodore LT liftback

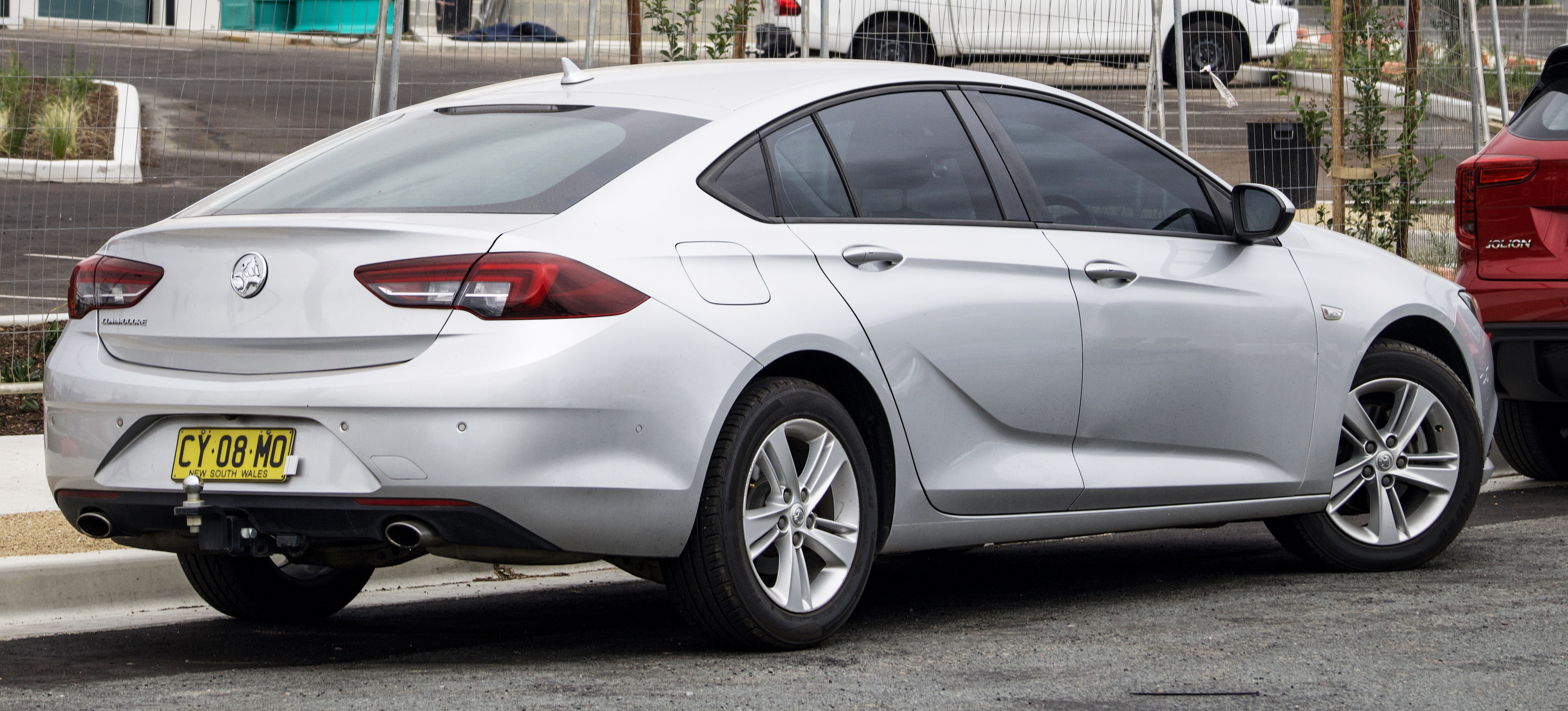
Commodore LT liftback

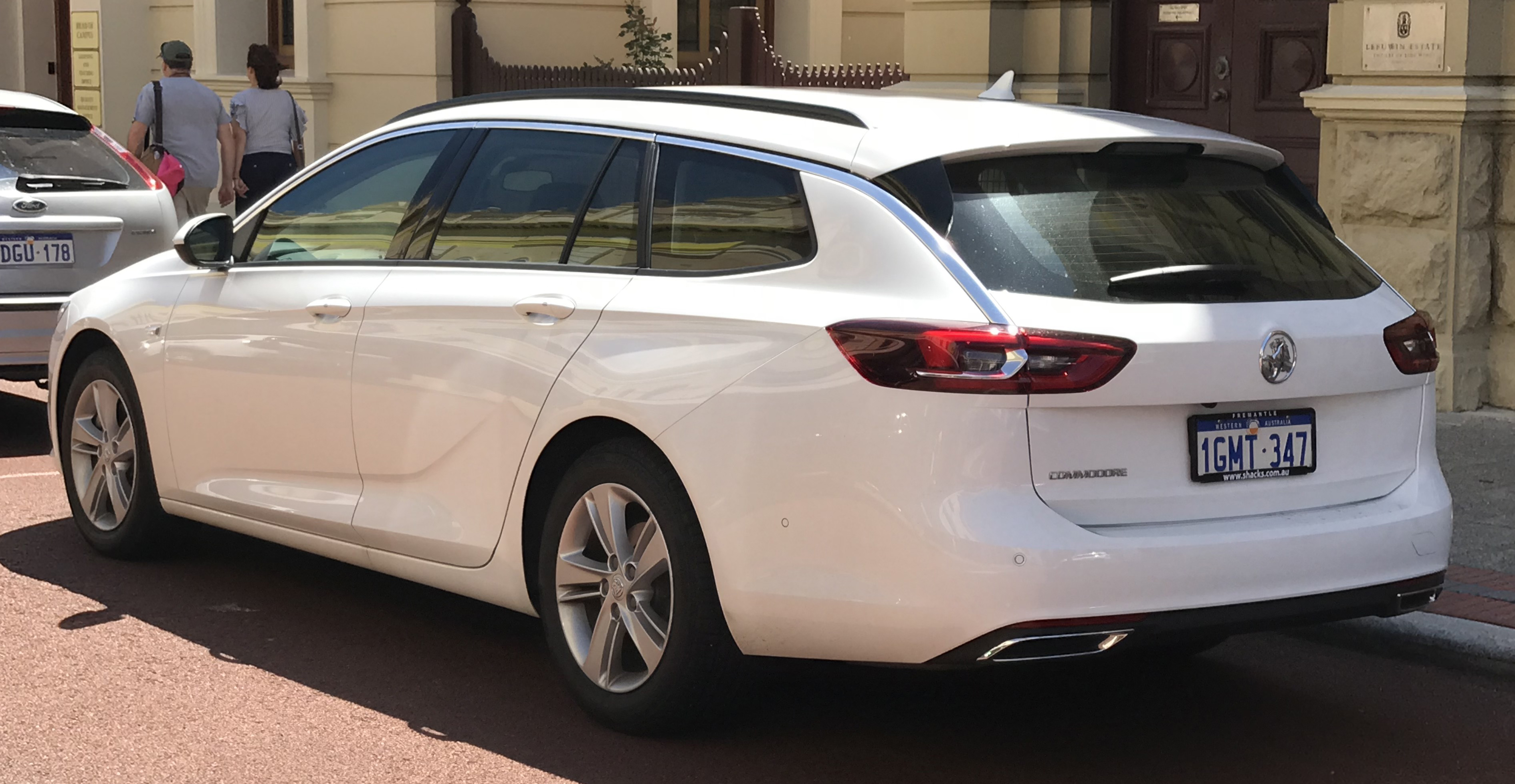
Commodore LT Sportwagon

== Rebadges ==
=== Export models ===
In the late 1990s Commodores were exported from Australia, branded as the Chevrolet Lumina in the Middle East until 2011 and South Africa until 2013, and as the Chevrolet Omega in Brazil until 2008 and, then again, in 2010. Versions were also previously exported in the mid-1990s to Southeast Asia, as the Opel Calais, and to North America from 2008 to 2009 as the Pontiac G8. The sport version from HSV was sold in the United Kingdom as the Vauxhall VXR8 from 2007 to 2017. From 2014 to 2017, the VF Commodore was sold in the United States as the Chevrolet SS.

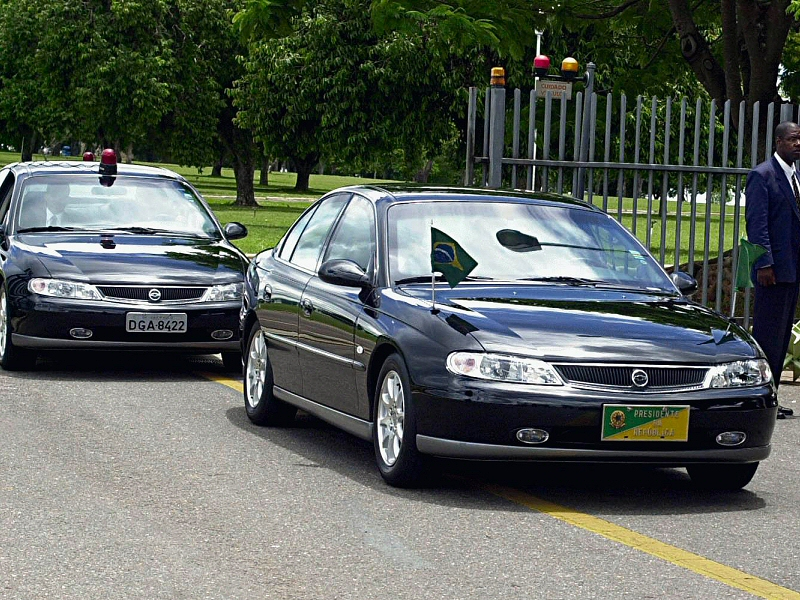
Chevrolet Omega (VX)

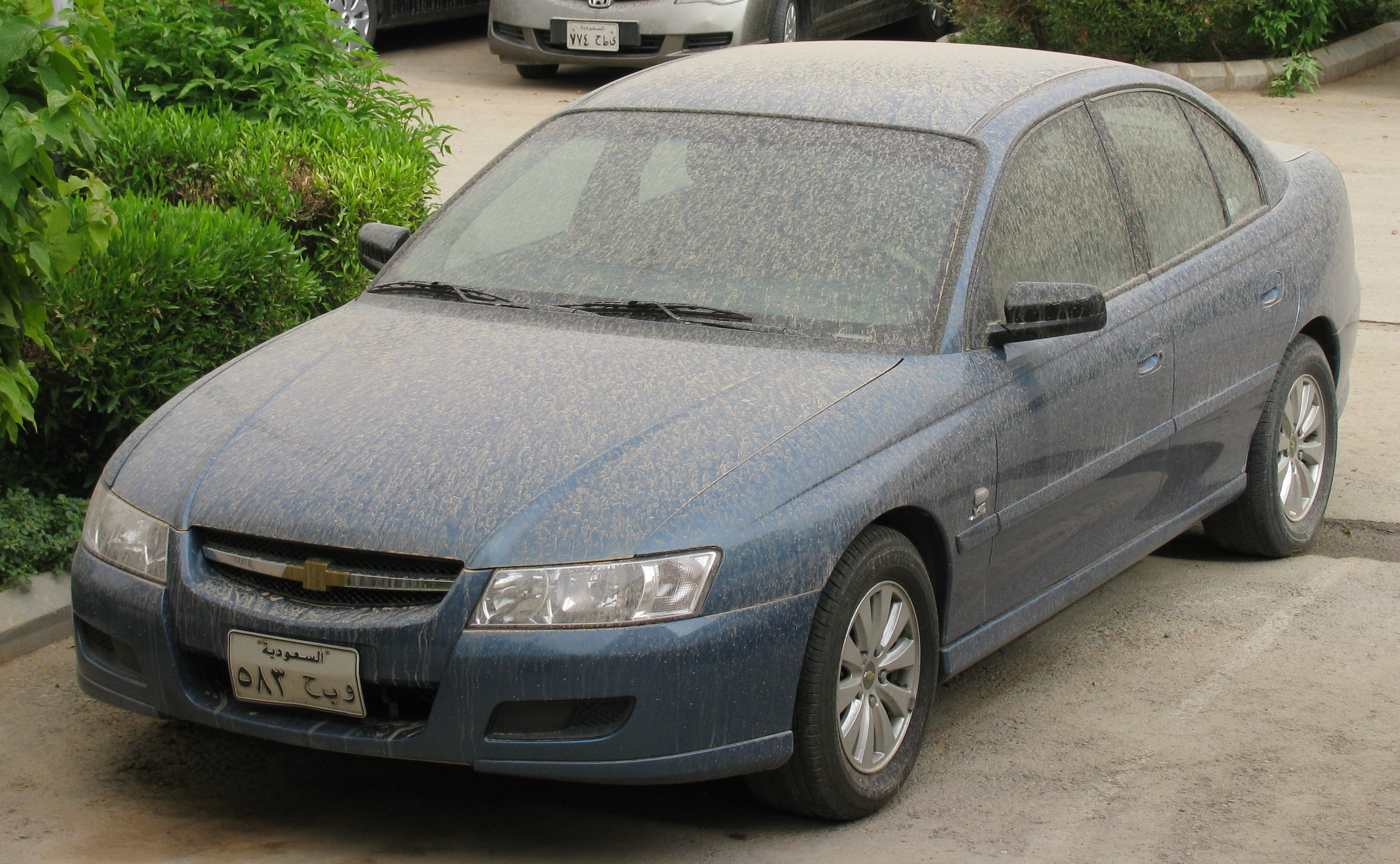
Chevrolet Lumina (VZ)

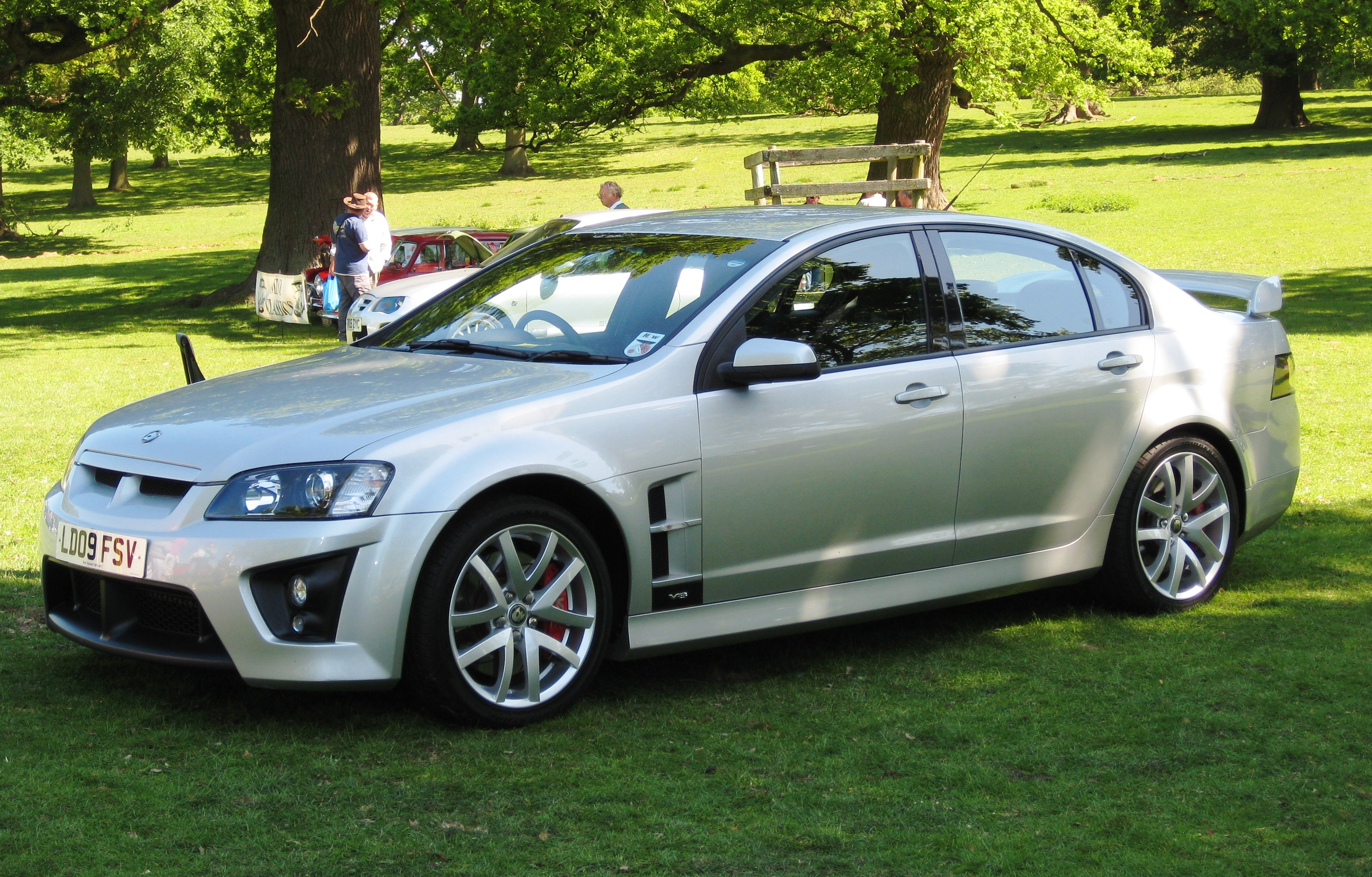
Vauxhall VXR8 (VE)

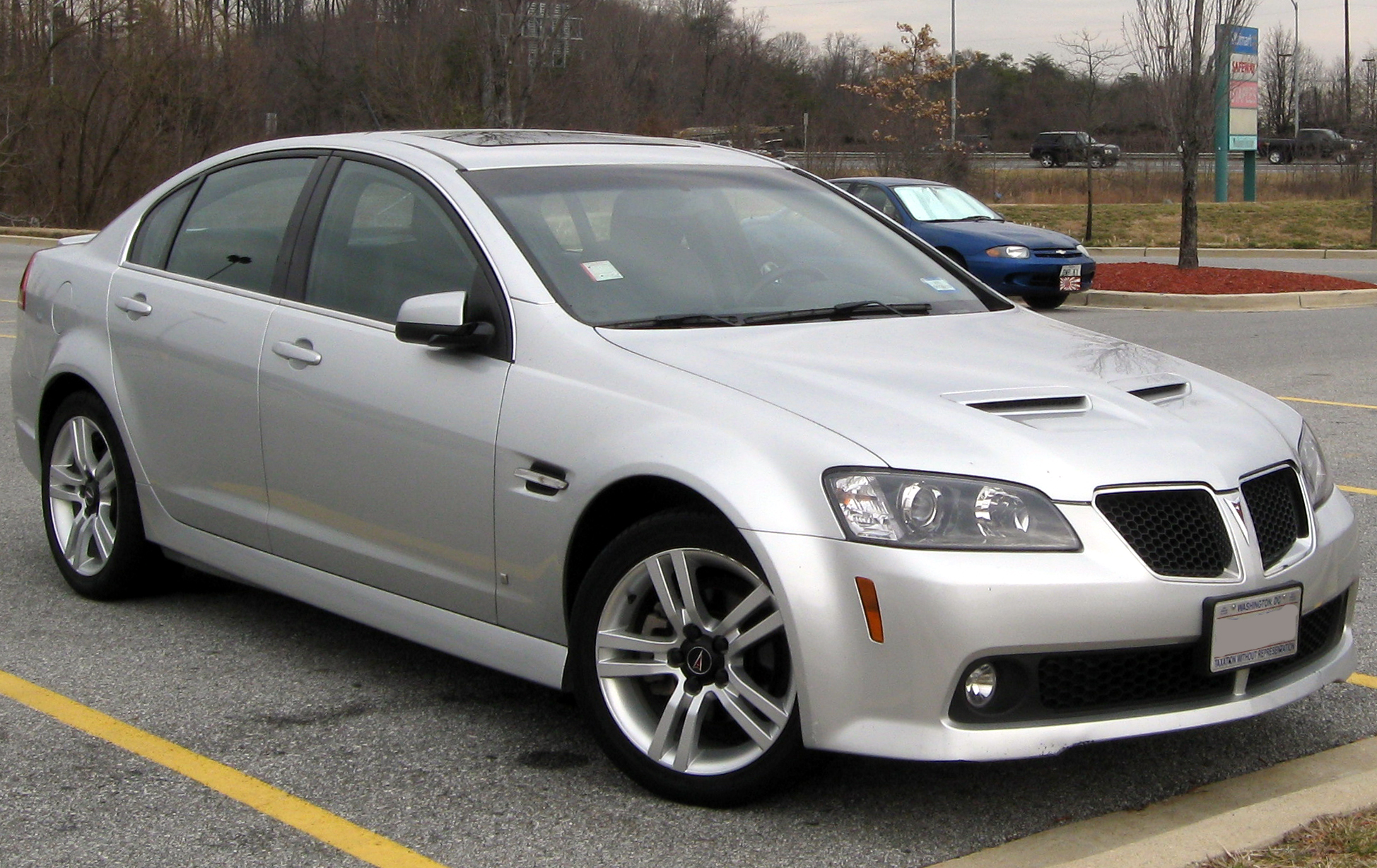
Pontiac G8 (VE)

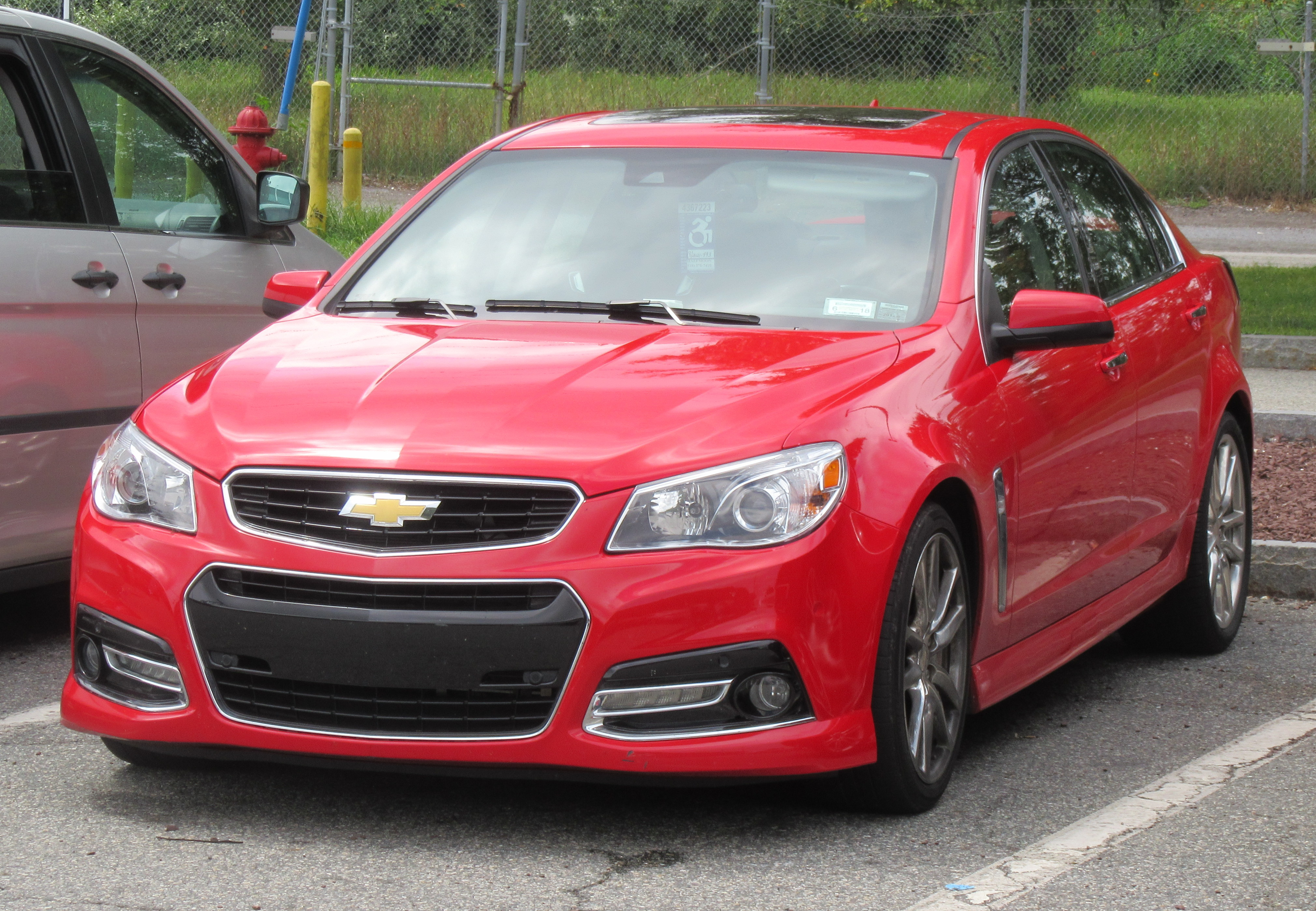
Chevrolet SS (VF)

=== Toyota Lexcen ===
The Toyota Lexcen is a full-size sedan rebadge of the Holden Commodore marketed under Toyota from August 1989 to August 1997.

In 1987, Holden and Toyota founded the joint venture United Australian Automobile Industries (UAAI), with Holden rebadging the Toyota Corolla and Camry as the Holden Nova and Apollo respectively. With Toyota rebadging the Holden Commodore, the name coming from Ben Lexcen. It was sold across the Commodore's VN, VP, VR, VS generations.

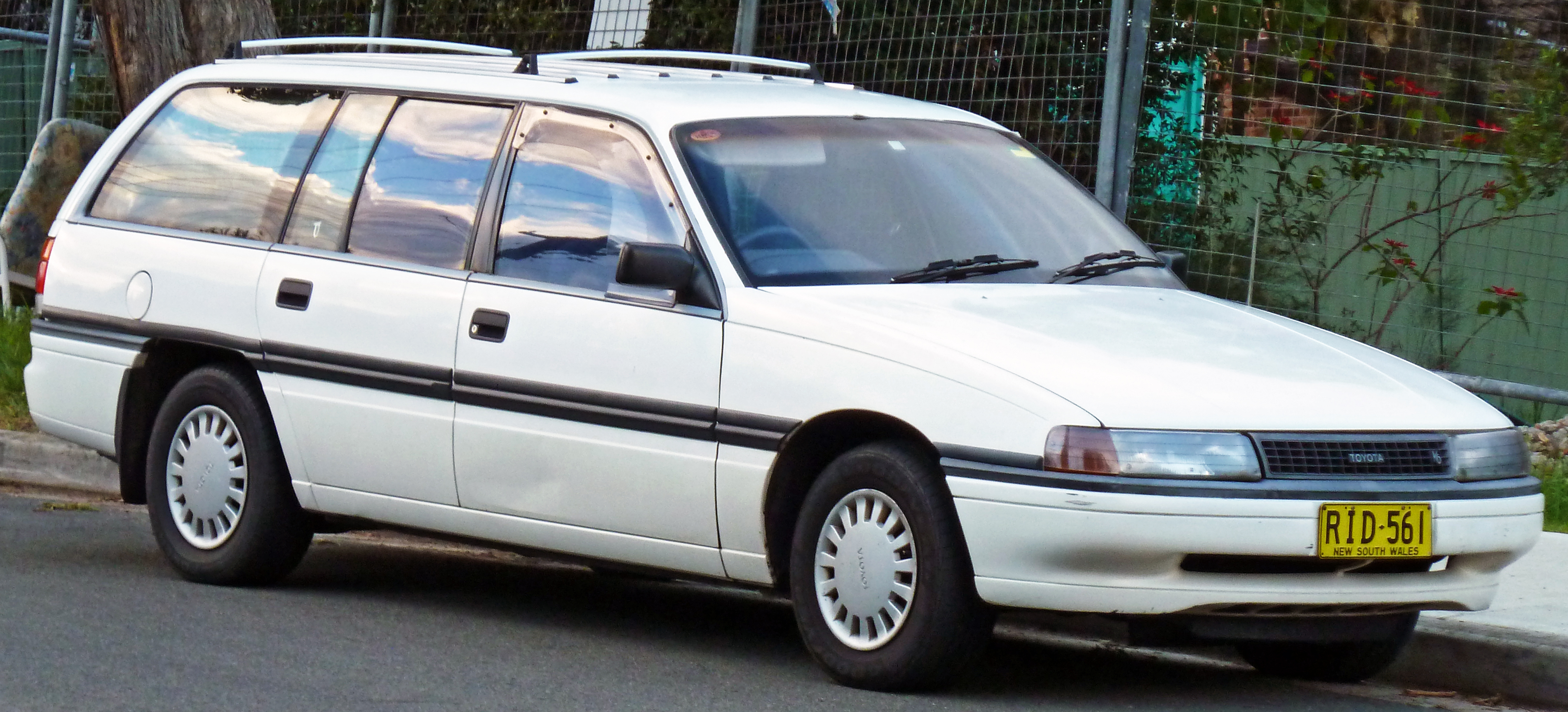
1989–1991 Toyota Lexcen (T1), based on the Holden Commodore (VN).

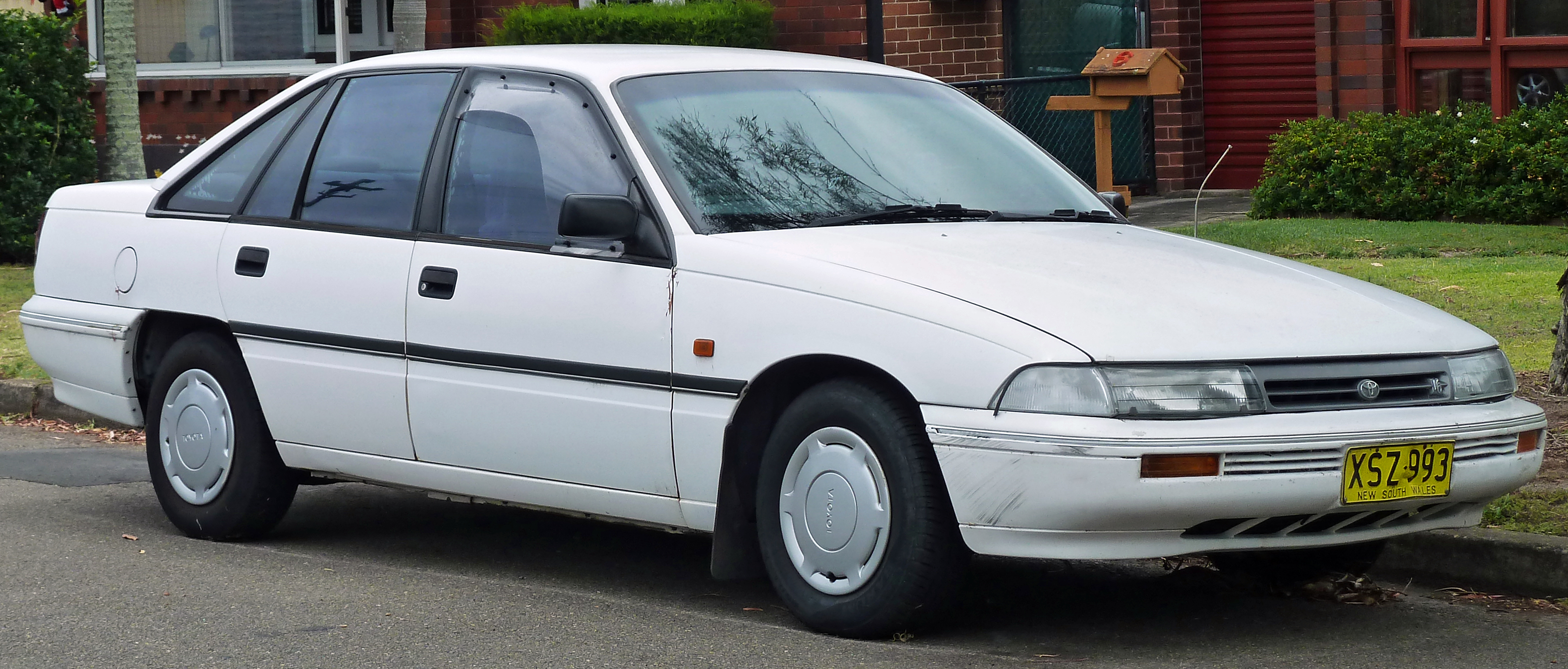
1991–1993 Toyota Lexcen (T2), based on the Holden Commodore (VP).

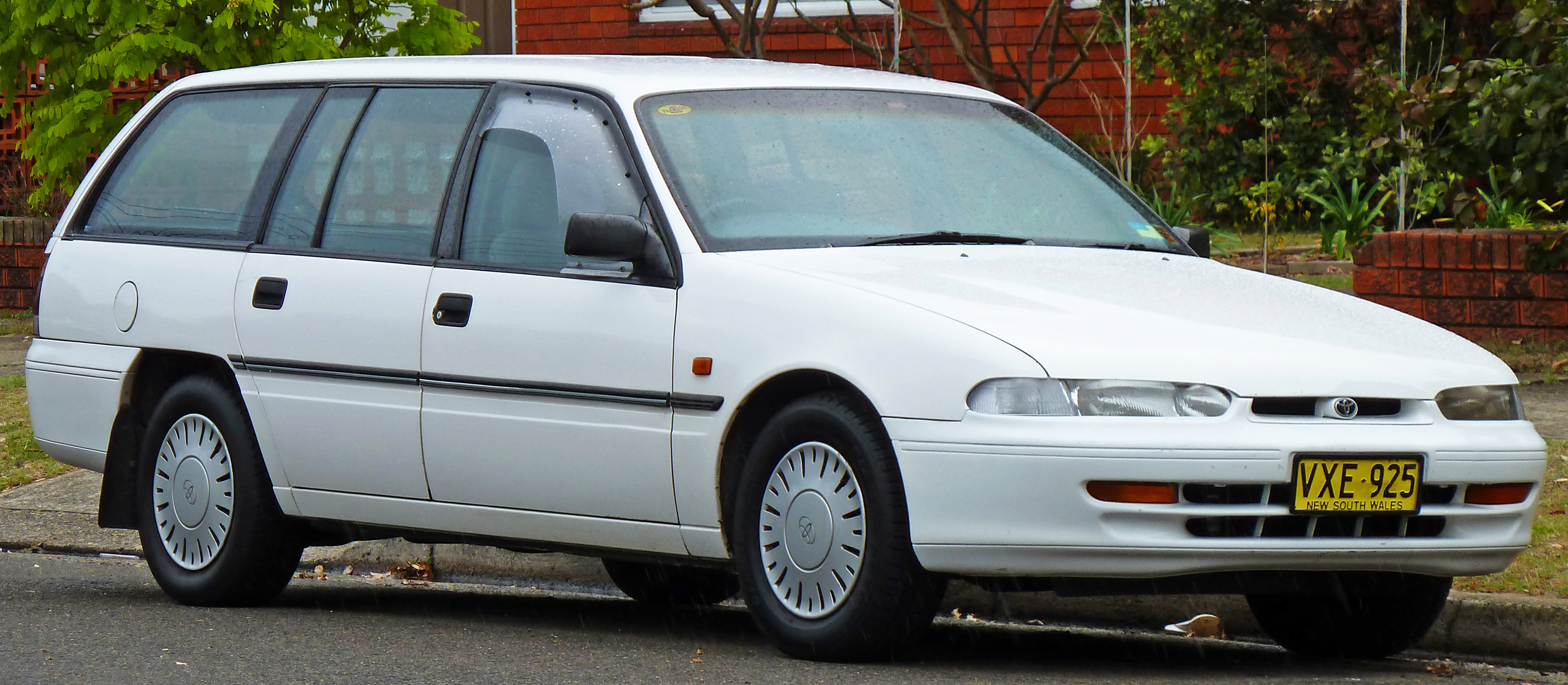
1993–1995 Toyota Lexcen (T3), based on the Holden Commodore (VR).

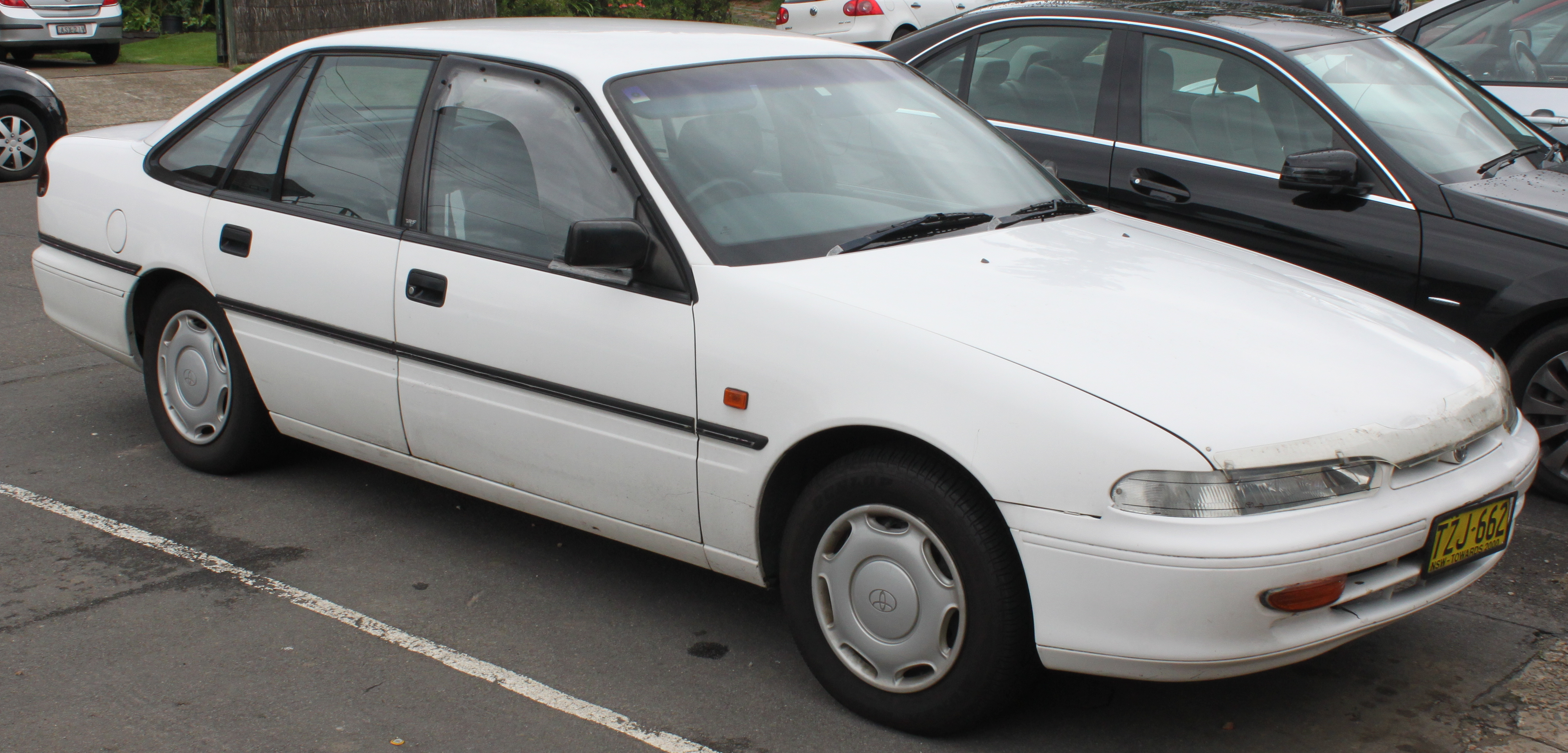
1995–1996 Toyota Lexcen (T4), based on the Holden Commodore (VS).

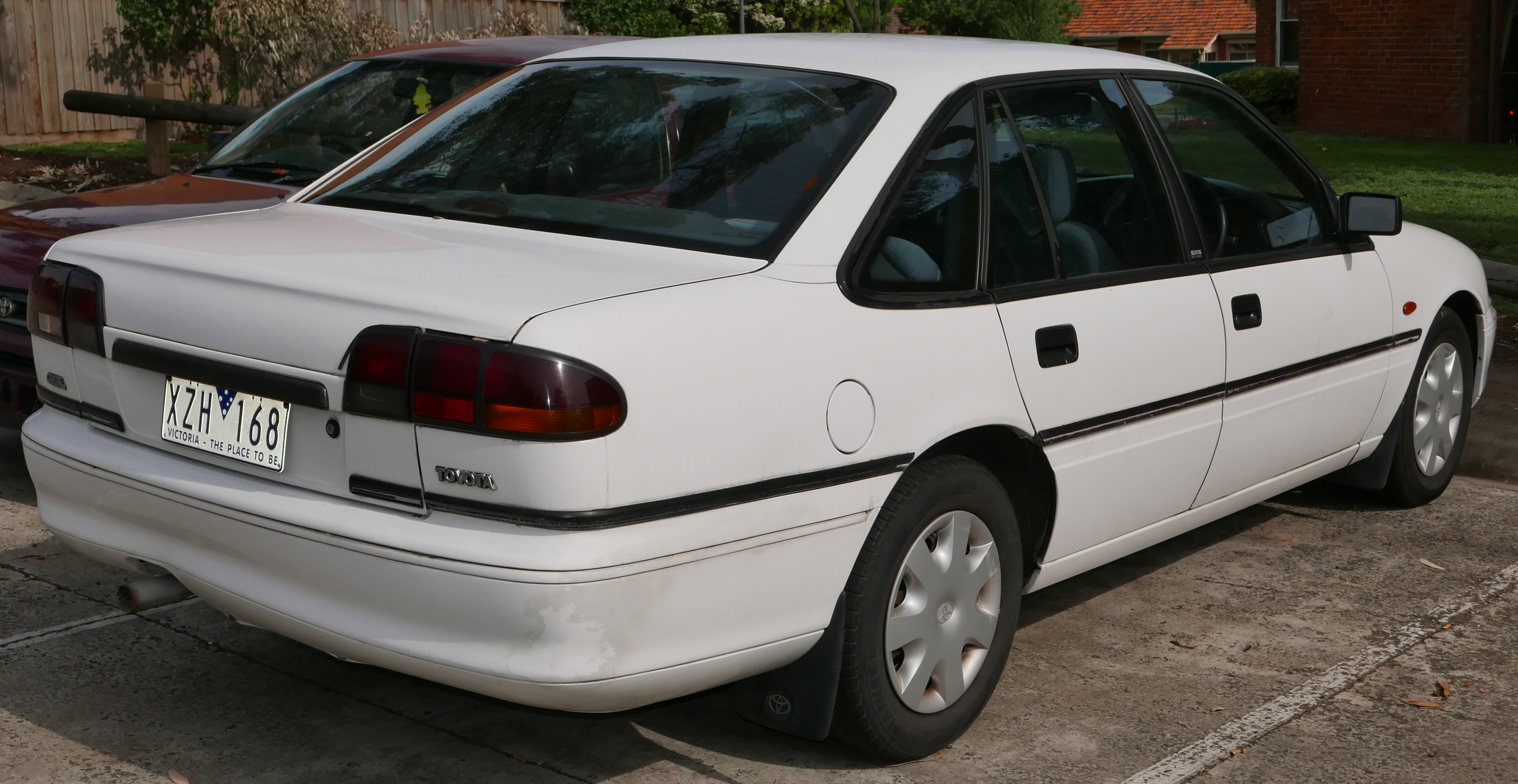
1996–1997 Toyota Lexcen (T5) based on the Holden Commodore (VS II).

== Australian production ==
Australian production of the first Commodore launched in 1978 was initially spread between Holden's Pagewood (New South Wales) and Dandenong (Victoria) plants. In August 1978, Holden announced a $6.7 million program to enable assembly of the Commodore range at the Elizabeth (South Australia) plant, which resulted in the closure of the Pagewood plant a year later. The Australian production of the Commodore was consolidated at Elizabeth in 1988, coinciding with the launch of the then new VN Commodore.

The Commodore and its derivatives have been the basis of modified variants by companies separate to Holden. Officially, Holden's performance partner is HSV, although other prominent high performance brands include HDT Special Vehicles, Corsa Specialized Vehicles (CSV) and Walkinshaw Performance (WP), since the first, third and fourth generation Commodore, respectively.

In December 2013, Holden announced that it would cease production of the Commodore in Australia in 2017. This was followed, in December 2015, by "Project Erich" involving Belgian entrepreneur Guido Dumarey. His plans involve buying the Holden production facilities, with a view to continue producing in Australia a rebadged range of RWD and AWD premium vehicles based on the GM Zeta platform, for local and export sales. Dumarey's company, Punch Powerglide, already supplies automatic transmissions for Holden's V6-powered models made in Australia. The last Commodore - the last Holden vehicle to be manufactured in Australia - rolled off the line at the Elizabeth plant on 20 October 2017.

== Sales ==
View source data.	Holden Commodore (sedan and wagon) Ford Falcon (sedan and wagon) Toyota Camry/ Avalon/Aurion (V6) Other Total large car segment

Holden Commodore sales in Australia
1980s	1980	1981	1982	1983	1984	1985	1986	1987	1988	1989
1980s			78,429	35,355		62,436				
1990s	1990	1991	1992	1993	1994	1995	1996	1997	1998	1999
1990s		50,820	57,641	62,663	75,330	80,452	83,001	76,849	94,642	85,648
2000s	2000	2001	2002	2003	2004	2005	2006	2007	2008	2009
2000s	83,610	85,422	88,478	86,553	79,170	66,794	56,531	57,307	51,093	44,387
2010s	2010	2011	2012	2013	2014	2015	2016	2017	2018	2019
2010s	45,956	40,617	30,532	27,766	30,203	27,770	25,860	23,676	9,040	5,915

Holden Adventra sales in Australia
2004	2005	2006	2007	2008	2009
2,500	3,153	2,543	655	2	1
