= 2005 Holden Performance Driving Centre V8 Supercar Series =

Motor racing competition

The 2005 Holden Performance Driving Centre V8 Supercar Series was an Australian touring car series held for V8 Supercars. It was the sixth series held for second tier V8 Supercars competitors. The season began on 18 March 2005 at Wakefield Park and finished on 27 November at Phillip Island Grand Prix Circuit. The season consisted of seven rounds held across four different states. The series was expanded for 2005, incorporating the previously stand-alone support race at Bathurst 1000 into a series round and adding a finale on the support program of the Bigpond Grand Finale.

Dean Canto, driving for Dick Johnson Racing's two car team, dominated the expanded series, winning ten races, and five of the seven rounds, which made Canto the first multiple winner of the series and directly led to a full-time return to V8 Supercar Championship Series with Garry Rogers Motorsport. Series runner up Paul Cruickshank Racing driver Warren Luff failed to score a win, staying in touch with Canto through consistency. Adam Macrow was the other multiple race-winner, taking victory four times, but some unlucky results saw him finish fourth in the points race behind Gary MacDonald. Shane Beikoff, Lee Holdsworth and Dale Brede took the remaining wins with Race 2 at Bathurst declared a no result after a multi-car collision blocked the track after just six laps.

== Teams and drivers ==
The following teams and drivers competed in the series.

| Team | Car | No. | Driver | Rounds |
|---|---|---|---|---|
| Brad Jones Racing | Ford AU Falcon | 19 | (Australia) Dale Brede | 2, 5 |
| Dick Johnson Racing | Ford AU Falcon | 19 | (Australia) Will Davison | 4 |
| Dick Johnson Racing | Ford BA Falcon | 71 | (Australia) Dean Canto | All |
| Dick Johnson Racing | Ford BA Falcon | 81 | (Australia) Grant Denyer | All |
| Howard Racing | Ford BA Falcon | 19 | (Australia) Stephen Voight | 6 |
| Howard Racing | Ford BA Falcon | 27 | (Australia) Adam Macrow | All |
| Howard Racing | Ford BA Falcon | 37 | (Australia) Mark Howard | All |
| Matthew White Racing | Ford AU Falcon | 28 | (Australia) Dean Wanless | All |
| Britek Motorsport | Ford BA Falcon | 26 | (Australia) José Fernández | All |
| A.N.T. Racing | Ford BA Falcon | 30 | (Australia) Tony Evangelou | 2–7 |
| Steven Ellery Racing | Ford BA Falcon | 31 | (New Zealand) Mark Porter | All |
| Steven Ellery Racing | Ford AU Falcon; Ford BA Falcon | 41 | (Australia) Gary MacDonald | All |
| McGill Motorsport | Holden VX Commodore | 32 | (Australia) Aaron McGill | All |
| Gravity Motorsport | Holden VX Commodore | 40 | (Australia) Mark Papendall | 1–5 |
| Jay Motorsport | Holden VY Commodore | 42 | (Australia) Jay Verdnik | All |
| John Henderson | Ford AU Falcon | 56 | (Australia) John Henderson | 1–4, 6–7 |
| JPS Automotive | Holden VX Commodore | 57 | (Australia) Dean Savage | 2–7 |
| Paul Cruickshank Racing | Ford BA Falcon | 60 | (Australia) Warren Luff | All |
| Paul Cruickshank Racing | Ford AU Falcon | 65 | (Australia) Phillip Scifleet | All |
| Scott Loadsman Racing | Holden VX Commodore | 62 | (Australia) Scott Loadsman | All |
| Rod Lynch Racing | Ford AU Falcon | 66 | (Australia) Adam Wallis | 1, 5–6 |
| Shane Beikoff Racing | Ford AU Falcon | 68 | (Australia) Shane Beikoff | 1–3, 6–7 |
| Shane Beikoff Racing | Ford AU Falcon | 68 | (Australia) Jonathan Beikoff | 4 |
| CarTrek Racing | Holden VX Commodore | 69 | (Australia) Robert Jones | 3–7 |
| Robert Smith Racing | Holden VY Commodore | 72 | (Australia) Lee Holdsworth | 3–7 |
| Peters Motorsport | Ford AU Falcon | 80 | (Australia) Barry Tanton | 2–4, 7 |
| Peters Motorsport | Ford AU Falcon | 91 | (Australia) Gary Deane | All |
| Greg Smith Racing | Ford AU Falcon | 86 | (Australia) Greg Smith | All |
| Sydney Star Racing | Holden VX Commodore; Ford AU Falcon | 98 | (Australia) Grant Elliott | All |
| Tony D'Alberto Racing | Holden VY Commodore | 99 | (Australia) Tony D'Alberto | All |

== Race calendar ==
| Round | Date | Circuit | Location | Winning driver | Car |
|---|---|---|---|---|---|
| 1 | 17–19 March | (South Australia) Adelaide Street Circuit | Adelaide, South Australia | (Australia) Dean Canto | Ford BA Falcon |
| 2 | 14–15 May | (New South Wales) Wakefield Park | Goulburn, New South Wales | (Australia) Adam Macrow | Ford BA Falcon |
| 3 | 9–10 July | (New South Wales) Eastern Creek Raceway | Sydney, New South Wales | (Australia) Dean Canto | Ford BA Falcon |
| 4 | 23–24 July | Queensland Raceway | Ipswich, Queensland | (Australia) Dean Canto | Ford BA Falcon |
| 5 | 20–21 August | (South Australia) Mallala Motor Sport Park | Mallala, South Australia | (Australia) Dean Canto | Ford BA Falcon |
| 6 | 6–8 October | (New South Wales) Mount Panorama Circuit | Bathurst, New South Wales | (Australia) Dean Canto | Ford BA Falcon |
| 7 | 26–27 November | (Victoria (state)) Phillip Island Grand Prix Circuit | Phillip Island, Victoria | (Australia) Adam Macrow | Ford BA Falcon |

== Points system ==
The series comprised seven rounds across four different states. Rounds 2, 3, 4 and 5 each consisted of three races. The second race of each weekend saw the finishing order of Race 1 reversed to form the grid, a 'reverse grid' race. Rounds 1, 6 and 7 each consisted of two races. Points were offered down to 32nd position in each race but at no point during the season did more than 24 cars finish a race.

| Position | 1st | 2nd | 3rd | 4th | 5th | 6th | 7th | 8th | 9th | 10th | 11th | 12th | 13th | 14th | 15th | 16th | 17th | 18th | 19th | 20th | 21st | 22nd | 23rd | 24th |
|---|---|---|---|---|---|---|---|---|---|---|---|---|---|---|---|---|---|---|---|---|---|---|---|---|
| Rounds 1, 6 & 7 points | 96 | 93 | 90 | 87 | 84 | 81 | 78 | 75 | 72 | 69 | 66 | 63 | 60 | 57 | 54 | 51 | 48 | 45 | 42 | 39 | 36 | 33 | 30 | 27 |
| Rounds 2, 3, 4 & 5 points | 64 | 62 | 60 | 58 | 56 | 54 | 52 | 50 | 48 | 46 | 44 | 42 | 40 | 38 | 36 | 34 | 32 | 30 | 28 | 26 | 24 | 22 | 20 | 18 |

== Series standings ==
| Pos. | Driver | No. | Car | ADE (South Australia) | | WAK (New South Wales) | | | EAS (New South Wales) | | | QLD (Queensland) | | | MAL (South Australia) | | | BAT (New South Wales) | | PHI (Victoria (state)) | | Points |
|---|---|---|---|---|---|---|---|---|---|---|---|---|---|---|---|---|---|---|---|---|---|---|
| 1 | (Australia) Dean Canto | 71 | Ford BA Falcon | 1 | 1 | 1 | DNS | DNS | 1 | 3 | 1 | 1 | 5 | 1 | 1 | 3 | 1 | 1 | C | 2 | 2 | 1098 |
| 2 | (Australia) Warren Luff | 60 | Ford BA Falcon | 9 | 9 | 2 | 8 | 2 | 3 | 2 | 2 | 3 | 2 | 3 | 3 | Ret | 6 | 2 | C | 4 | 3 | 1068 |
| 3 | (Australia) Gary MacDonald | 41 | Ford AU Falcon; Ford BA Falcon | 5 | 5 | 4 | 10 | 5 | 9 | 8 | 10 | 8 | 7 | 9 | 15 | 2 | 3 | 5 | C | 6 | 7 | 1023 |
| 4 | (Australia) Adam Macrow | 27 | Ford BA Falcon | 2 | 2 | 5 | 6 | 1 | 2 | 7 | 7 | 5 | 1 | 4 | 21 | Ret | DNS | 4 | C | 1 | 1 | 1007 |
| 5 | (Australia) Tony D'Alberto | 99 | Holden VY Commodore | 3 | 3 | 3 | 19 | 7 | 4 | 5 | 3 | 6 | 9 | 14 | 10 | Ret | 7 | 3 | C | 3 | 4 | 999 |
| 6 | (Australia) Phillip Scifleet | 65 | Ford AU Falcon | 4 | 4 | 7 | 12 | 6 | 5 | 6 | 5 | 9 | 16 | 6 | 6 | 4 | 8 | 11 | C | Ret | 9 | 924 |
| 7 | (Australia) José Fernández | 26 | Ford BA Falcon | Ret | 7 | 10 | 16 | 8 | 6 | Ret | 9 | 11 | 8 | 8 | 4 | 6 | 9 | 10 | C | 8 | 6 | 839 |
| 8 | (Australia) Aaron McGill | 32 | Holden VX Commodore | 11 | 10 | 17 | 2 | 12 | 12 | 15 | 13 | 20 | 11 | 18 | 16 | 13 | 14 | 18 | C | 15 | 13 | 758 |
| 9 | (New Zealand) Mark Porter | 31 | Ford BA Falcon | 7 | Ret | 6 | 9 | 4 | 8 | 4 | 8 | 7 | 6 | 13 | 2 | Ret | 4 | 6 | C | Ret | DNS | 743 |
| 10 | (Australia) Grant Denyer | 81 | Ford BA Falcon | DNS | DNS | 12 | 11 | 10 | 7 | 11 | 6 | 10 | 10 | 7 | 7 | 5 | 5 | 7 | C | Ret | 10 | 737 |
| 11 | (Australia) Grant Elliott | 98 | Holden VX Commodore; Ford AU Falcon | 6 | Ret | 11 | 14 | 9 | 11 | 10 | 12 | DNS | DNS | DNS | 8 | 9 | 12 | 9 | C | 16 | 17 | 654 |
| 12 | (Australia) Tony Evangelou | 30 | Ford BA Falcon | | | 13 | 7 | 13 | 10 | 9 | 20 | 13 | Ret | DNS | 9 | 10 | 10 | 22 | C | 7 | 8 | 618 |
| 13 | (Australia) Lee Holdsworth | 72 | Holden VY Commodore | | | | | | 24 | 1 | 4 | 4 | 4 | 5 | Ret | 7 | Ret | 8 | C | 5 | 5 | 607 |
| 14 | (Australia) Mark Howard | 37 | Ford BA Falcon | 8 | 8 | 15 | 13 | 11 | 14 | 16 | 14 | 14 | 14 | 20 | 12 | Ret | DNS | Ret | C | Ret | 12 | 587 |
| 15 | (Australia) Gary Deane | 91 | Ford AU Falcon | 12 | Ret | Ret | 15 | 16 | 19 | 18 | 18 | 15 | 15 | 12 | 17 | 12 | 17 | 16 | C | Ret | 16 | 543 |
| 16 | (Australia) Dean Wanless | 28 | Ford AU Falcon | Ret | 11 | 14 | 3 | 15 | 13 | 12 | 23 | Ret | DNS | DNS | 14 | 17 | 18 | Ret | C | 10 | 11 | 537 |
| 17 | (Australia) Greg Smith | 86 | Ford AU Falcon | 17 | 14 | 21 | 18 | 17 | 20 | Ret | 21 | 17 | Ret | 17 | 22 | 16 | Ret | 20 | C | 12 | 18 | 508 |
| 18 | (Australia) Shane Beikoff | 68 | Ford AU Falcon | 13 | 12 | 20 | 1 | Ret | 17 | 17 | 17 | | | | | | | 17 | C | 11 | 14 | 480 |
| 19 | (Australia) Scott Loadsman | 62 | Holden VX Commodore | 16 | 15 | 19 | DNS | 14 | Ret | 14 | 19 | 16 | 19 | 16 | 19 | 14 | 15 | 19 | C | Ret | DNS | 477 |
| 20 | (Australia) Jay Verdnik | 42 | Holden VX Commodore | Ret | Ret | 9 | DNS | DNS | 15 | Ret | 11 | 12 | 18 | 10 | 13 | 8 | Ret | 13 | C | 9 | Ret | 468 |
| 21 | (Australia) Mark Papendall | 40 | Holden VX Commodore; Ford AU Falcon | 14 | 13 | 18 | 17 | 20 | 16 | 19 | 15 | Ret | 17 | DNS | 18 | 15 | 16 | | | | | 435 |
| 22 | (Australia) Robert Jones | 69 | Holden VX Commodore | | | | | | 18 | Ret | Ret | 21 | 13 | 11 | 11 | 11 | 13 | 12 | C | Ret | 15 | 383 |
| 23 | (Australia) Adam Wallis | 66 | Ford AU Falcon | 10 | 6 | | | | | | | | | | 5 | 18 | 11 | 15 | C | | | 334 |
| 24 | (Australia) Dale Brede | 19 | Ford AU Falcon | | | 8 | 4 | 3 | | | | | | | 23 | 1 | 2 | | | | | 314 |
| 25 | (Australia) Dean Savage | 57 | Holden VX Commodore | | | 23 | 21 | 19 | 21 | Ret | 22 | 19 | Ret | Ret | 20 | Ret | DNS | 21 | C | 13 | 19 | 310 |
| 26 | (Australia) John Henderson | 56 | Ford AU Falcon | 15 | Ret | 16 | 5 | Ret | 23 | 13 | 16 | Ret | DNS | DNS | | | | 21 | C | 13 | 19 | 238 |
| 27 | (Australia) Barry Tanton | 80 | Ford AU Falcon | | | 22 | 20 | 18 | 22 | 20 | Ret | Ret | DNS | 19 | | | | | | 14 | Ret | 211 |
| 28 | (Australia) Will Davison | 19 | Ford AU Falcon | | | | | | | | | 2 | 3 | 2 | | | | | | | | 184 |
| 29 | (Australia) Jonathan Beikoff | 68 | Ford AU Falcon | | | | | | | | | 18 | 12 | 15 | | | | | | | | 108 |
| 30 | (Australia) Stephen Voight | 19 | Ford BA Falcon | | | | | | | | | | | | | | | 14 | C | | | 57 |
| Pos. | Driver | No. | Car | ADE (South Australia) | | WAK (New South Wales) | | | EAS (New South Wales) | | | QLD (Queensland) | | | MAL (South Australia) | | | BAT (New South Wales) | | PHI (Victoria (state)) | | Points |

| Colour | Result |
|---|---|
| Gold | Winner |
| Silver | Second place |
| Bronze | Third place |
| Green | Points classification |
| Blue | Non-points classification |
| Blue | Non-classified finish (NC) |
| Purple | Retired, not classified (Ret) |
| Red | Did not qualify (DNQ) |
| Red | Did not pre-qualify (DNPQ) |
| Black | Disqualified (DSQ) |
| White | Did not start (DNS) |
| White | Withdrew (WD) |
| White | Race cancelled (C) |
| Blank | Did not practice (DNP) |
| Blank | Did not arrive (DNA) |
| Blank | Excluded (EX) |

Note: Due to time constraints, Race 2 at the Bathurst round was abandoned and no points were awarded.

== See also ==
- 2005 V8 Supercar season
