= 2005 V8 Supercar season =

Seasons
- ← 2004 2006 →

The 2005 V8 Supercar season was the 46th year of touring car racing in Australia since the first runnings of the Australian Touring Car Championship and the fore-runner of the present day Bathurst 1000, the Armstrong 500.

There were 21 touring car race meetings held during 2005; a thirteen-round series for V8 Supercars, the 2005 V8 Supercar Championship Series (VCS), two of them endurance races; a seven-round second tier V8 Supercar series 2005 Holden Performance Driving Centre V8 Supercar Series (HVS) and V8 Supercar support programme event at the 2005 Australian Grand Prix.

== Results and standings ==
=== Race calendar ===
The 2005 Australian touring car season consisted of 21 events.

Date	Series	Circuit	City / state	Winner	Team	Car	Report
4–6 Mar	QANTAS V8 Supercars GP 100	Albert Park Circuit	Melbourne, Victoria	Mark Skaife	Holden Racing Team	Holden VZ Commodore	report
17–20 Mar	HVS Round 1	Adelaide Street Circuit	Adelaide, South Australia	Dean Canto	Dick Johnson Racing	Ford BA Falcon	
17–20 Mar	Clipsal 500 VCS Round 1	Adelaide Street Circuit	Adelaide, South Australia	Marcos Ambrose	Stone Brothers Racing	Ford BA Falcon	
15–17 April	PlaceMakers V8 International VCS Round 2	Pukekohe Park Raceway	Pukekohe, New Zealand	Greg Murphy	Paul Weel Racing	Holden VZ Commodore	
6–8 May	VB 400 VCS Round 3	Wanneroo Raceway	Perth, Western Australia	Steven Richards	Castrol Perkins Racing	Holden VY Commodore	
15 May	HVS Round 2	Wakefield Park	Goulburn, New South Wales	Adam Macrow	Howard Racing	Ford BA Falcon	
27–29 May	VCS Round 4	Eastern Creek Raceway	Sydney, New South Wales	Craig Lowndes	Triple Eight Race Engineering	Ford BA Falcon	
10–12 Jun	V8 Supercars China Round VCS Round 5	Shanghai International Circuit	Shanghai, China	Todd Kelly	Holden Racing Team	Holden VZ Commodore	
1–3 Jul	Skycity Triple Crown VCS Round 6	Hidden Valley Raceway	Darwin, Northern Territory	Todd Kelly	Holden Racing Team	Holden VZ Commodore	
10 Jul	HVS Round 3	Eastern Creek Raceway	Sydney, New South Wales	Dean Canto	Dick Johnson Racing	Ford BA Falcon	
22–24 Jul	HVS Round 4	Queensland Raceway	Ipswich, Queensland	Dean Canto	Dick Johnson Racing	Ford BA Falcon	
22–24 Jul	VCS Round 7	Queensland Raceway	Ipswich, Queensland	Craig Lowndes	Triple Eight Race Engineering	Ford BA Falcon	
14–15 Aug	VCS Round 8	Oran Park Raceway	Sydney, New South Wales	Russell Ingall	Stone Brothers Racing	Ford BA Falcon	
21 Aug	HVS Round 5	Mallala Motor Sport Park	Mallala, South Australia	Dean Canto	Dick Johnson Racing	Ford BA Falcon	
9–11 Sep	Betta Electrical 500 VCS Round 9	Sandown Raceway	Melbourne, Victoria	Craig Lowndes; Yvan Muller	Triple Eight Race Engineering	Ford BA Falcon	report
6–9 Oct	HVS Round 6	Mount Panorama Circuit	Bathurst, New South Wales	Dean Canto	Dick Johnson Racing	Ford BA Falcon	
6–9 Oct	Supercheap Auto 1000 VCS Round 10	Mount Panorama Circuit	Bathurst, New South Wales	Mark Skaife; Todd Kelly	Holden Racing Team	Holden VZ Commodore	report
20–23 Oct	Gillette V8 Supercar Challenge VCS Round 11	Surfers Paradise Street Circuit	Surfers Paradise, Queensland	Craig Lowndes	Triple Eight Race Engineering	Ford BA Falcon	
12–13 Nov	Ferodo Triple Challenge VCS Round 12	Symmons Plains Raceway	Launceston, Tasmania	Garth Tander	HSV Dealer Team	Holden VZ Commodore	
25–27 Nov	HVS Round 7	Phillip Island Grand Prix Circuit	Phillip Island, Victoria	Adam Macrow	Howard Racing	Ford BA Falcon	
25–27 Nov	BigPond Grand Finale VCS Round 13	Phillip Island Grand Prix Circuit	Phillip Island, Victoria	Marcos Ambrose	Stone Brothers Racing	Ford BA Falcon	

=== QANTAS V8 Supercars GP 100 ===
This meeting was a support event of the 2005 Australian Grand Prix.

Driver	No.	Team	Car	Race 1	GP 100	Race 3	Points
(Australia) Mark Skaife	2	Holden Racing Team	Holden VZ Commodore	3	3	1	184
(Australia) Marcos Ambrose	4	Stone Brothers Racing	Ford BA Falcon	2	4	2	182
(Australia) Russell Ingall	9	Stone Brothers Racing	Ford BA Falcon	4	5	3	174
(Australia) John Bowe	12	Brad Jones Racing	Ford BA Falcon	11	1	5	164
(Australia) Jamie Whincup	23	Tasman Motorsport	Holden VZ Commodore	14	8	7	140
(Australia) Jason Bright	6	Ford Performance Racing	Ford BA Falcon	5	7	18	138
(Australia) Brad Jones	21	Brad Jones Racing	Ford BA Falcon	24	2	6	134
(Australia) Cameron McConville	33	Garry Rogers Motorsport	Holden VZ Commodore	6	20	13	120
(New Zealand) Jason Richards	3	Tasman Motorsport	Holden VZ Commodore	17	13	10	118
(New Zealand) Steven Richards	11	Castrol Perkins Racing	Holden VY Commodore	8	22	11	116
(Australia) Craig Lowndes	888	Triple Eight Race Engineering	Ford BA Falcon	DNF	6	4	112
(Australia) Mark Winterbottom	20	Larkham Motor Sport	Ford BA Falcon	20	14	9	112
(Australia) Jason Bargwanna	10	Larkham Motor Sport	Ford BA Falcon	27	12	8	104
(Australia) Glenn Seton	18	Dick Johnson Racing	Ford BA Falcon	16	21	12	100
(Australia) Steve Ellery	88	Triple Eight Race Engineering	Ford BA Falcon	15	9	DNF	84
(Australia) Will Davison	44	Team Dynamik	Holden VZ Commodore	13	11	DNF	84
(Australia) Steven Johnson	17	Dick Johnson Racing	Ford BA Falcon	10	15	DNF	82
(Australia) Greg Ritter	5	Ford Performance Racing	Ford BA Falcon	9	17	DNF	80
(Australia) Matthew White	25	Britek Motorsport	Ford BA Falcon	25	19	15	80
(New Zealand) Paul Radisich	021	Team Kiwi Racing	Holden VZ Commodore	7	23	DNF	72
(Australia) Garth Tander	16	HSV Dealer Team	Holden VZ Commodore	DNF	18	13	68
(Australia) Todd Kelly	22	Holden Racing Team	Holden VZ Commodore	1	DNF	DNS	64
(Australia) Alex Davison	7	Castrol Perkins Racing	Holden VY Commodore	21	DNF	16	58
(Australia) Andrew Jones	34	Garry Rogers Motorsport	Holden VZ Commodore	23	DNF	17	52
(Australia) Rick Kelly	15	HSV Dealer Team	Holden VZ Commodore	DNF	10	DNF	46
(Australia) Paul Morris	29	Paul Morris Motorsport	Holden VZ Commodore	26	DNF	19	42
(Australia) Tony Longhurst	45	Team Dynamik	Holden VZ Commodore	29	16	DNF	42
(Australia) Paul Weel	50	Paul Weel Racing	Holden VZ Commodore	12	DNF	DNS	42
(New Zealand) Greg Murphy	51	Paul Weel Racing	Holden VZ Commodore	28	DNF	20	36
(Australia) Anthony Tratt	75	Paul Little Racing	Holden VY Commodore	18	DNF	DNS	30
(New Zealand) Craig Baird	8	WPS Racing	Ford BA Falcon	19	DNF	DNS	28
(Australia) David Besnard	48	WPS Racing	Ford BA Falcon	22	DNF	DNS	22
