= 2005 Betta Electrical 500 =

2005 Supercar Championship event

(Victoria (state)) 2005 Betta Electrical 500
Event Information
- Round 9 of 13 in the 2005 V8 Supercar Championship Series
- Date: 9–11 September 2005
- Location: Melbourne, Victoria
- Venue: Sandown International Raceway
- Weather: Fine

Results
Race 1
Distance	161 laps	500 km
Pole position	Garth Tander; HSV Dealer Team	1:10.8917
Winner	Craig Lowndes; Yvan Muller; Triple Eight Race Engineering	3:30:51.8944
Round Results
First	Craig Lowndes Yvan Muller; Triple Eight Race Engineering	192 pts
Second	Mark Skaife Todd Kelly; Holden Racing Team	188 pts
Third	Jason Richards Jamie Whincup; Tasman Motorsport	184 pts

The 2005 Betta Electrical 500 was the ninth round of the 2005 V8 Supercar Championship Series. It was held on the weekend of the 9 to 11 September at Sandown Raceway in Victoria.

It was the 38th "Sandown 500" endurance race.

== Top ten shootout ==
Pos	No	Team	Driver	Car	Time
Pole	16	HSV Dealer Team	(Australia) Garth Tander	Holden VZ Commodore	1:10.8917
2	888	Team Betta Electrical	(Australia) Craig Lowndes	Ford BA Falcon	1:11.0773
3	51	Paul Weel Racing	(New Zealand) Greg Murphy	Holden VZ Commodore	1:11.2219
4	9	Stone Brothers Racing	(Australia) Russell Ingall	Ford BA Falcon	1:11.2478
5	1	Stone Brothers Racing	(Australia) Marcos Ambrose	Ford BA Falcon	1:11.2640
6	2	Holden Racing Team	(Australia) Mark Skaife	Holden VZ Commodore	1:11.4069
7	88	Team Betta Electrical	(Australia) Steven Ellery	Ford BA Falcon	1:11.5192
8	24	Castrol Perkins Racing	(New Zealand) Steven Richards	Holden VZ Commodore	1:11.5264
9	6	Ford Performance Racing	(Australia) Jason Bright	Ford BA Falcon	1:11.8541
10	17	Dick Johnson Racing	(Australia) Steven Johnson	Ford BA Falcon	1:12.0887

== Race results ==
Pos	No	Drivers	Team	Car	Laps	Time/Gap	Grid	Points
1	888	(Australia) Craig Lowndes (France) Yvan Muller	Triple Eight Race Engineering	Ford Falcon BA	161	3:30:51.8944	2	192
2	2	(Australia) Mark Skaife (Australia) Todd Kelly	Holden Racing Team	Holden Commodore VZ	161	+35.6172	6	188
3	3	(New Zealand) Jason Richards (Australia) Jamie Whincup	Tasman Motorsport	Holden Commodore VZ	161	+50.8887	13	184
4	16	(Australia) Garth Tander (Australia) Rick Kelly	HSV Dealer Team	Holden Commodore VZ	161	+56.2408	1	180
5	88	(Australia) Steven Ellery (Australia) Adam Macrow	Triple Eight Race Engineering	Ford Falcon BA	161	+1:01.4905	7	176
6	6	(Australia) Jason Bright (Australia) David Brabham	Ford Performance Racing	Ford Falcon BA	160	+1 lap	9	172
7	9	(Australia) Russell Ingall (Australia) Luke Youlden	Stone Brothers Racing	Ford Falcon BA	160	+1 lap	4	168
8	67	(Australia) Paul Morris (New Zealand) Paul Radisich	Paul Morris Motorsport; Team Kiwi Racing	Holden Commodore VZ	160	+1 lap	19	164
9	21	(Australia) John Bowe (Australia) Brad Jones	Brad Jones Racing	Ford Falcon BA	160	+1 lap	12	160
10	34	(Australia) Cameron McConville (Australia) Andrew Jones	Garry Rogers Motorsport	Holden Commodore VZ	160	+1 lap	11	156
11	22	(New Zealand) Jim Richards (Australia) James Courtney	Holden Racing Team	Holden Commodore VZ	159	+2 laps	18	152
12	18	(Australia) Glenn Seton (Australia) Dean Canto	Dick Johnson Racing	Ford Falcon BA	159	+2 laps	17	148
13	24	(New Zealand) Steven Richards (Australia) Paul Dumbrell	Perkins Engineering	Holden Commodore VY	159	+2 laps	8	144
14	1	(Australia) Marcos Ambrose (Australia) Warren Luff	Stone Brothers Racing	Ford Falcon BA	159	+2 laps	5	140
15	5	(Australia) Greg Ritter (Australia) Cameron McLean	Ford Performance Racing	Ford Falcon BA	159	+2 laps	15	136
16	20	(Australia) Jason Bargwanna (Australia) Mark Winterbottom	Larkham Motorsport	Ford Falcon BA	158	+3 laps	14	132
17	7	(Australia) Alex Davison (Denmark) Allan Simonsen	Perkins Engineering	Holden Commodore VY	158	+3 laps	31	128
18	17	(Australia) Steven Johnson (Australia) Will Davison	Dick Johnson Racing	Ford Falcon BA	158	+3 laps	10	124
19	48	(New Zealand) Craig Baird (Australia) David Besnard	WPS Racing	Ford Falcon BA	158	+3 laps	23	120
20	33	(Australia) Phillip Scifleet (Australia) Lee Holdsworth	Garry Rogers Motorsport	Holden Commodore VZ	157	+4 laps	27	116
21	12	(United Kingdom) John Cleland (Australia) Dale Brede	Brad Jones Racing	Ford Falcon BA	157	+4 laps	20	112
22	8	(Australia) Marcus Marshall (Canada) Alex Tagliani	WPS Racing	Ford Falcon BA	157	+4 laps	25	108
23	25	(Australia) Steve Owen (Australia) Matthew White	Britek Motorsport	Ford Falcon BA	156	+5 laps	22	104
24	52	(Australia) José Fernández (Australia) Damien White	Britek Motorsport	Ford Falcon BA	153	+8 laps	34	100
25	75	(Australia) Anthony Tratt (Australia) Tony Evangelou	Paul Little Racing	Holden Commodore VY	153	+8 laps	29	96
26	11	(Australia) Matthew Coleman (Australia) Christian D'Agostin	Perkins Engineering	Holden Commodore VY	152	+9 laps	32	92
DNF	23	(New Zealand) Fabian Coulthard (Australia) Tony D'Alberto	Tasman Motorsport	Holden Commodore VZ	156	Crash	26	
DNF	51	(New Zealand) Greg Murphy (Australia) Paul Weel	Paul Weel Racing	Holden Commodore VZ	140	Engine	3	
DNF	10	(Switzerland) Alain Menu (New Zealand) Matt Halliday	Larkham Motorsport	Ford Falcon BA	116		24	
DNF	15	(Australia) Tim Leahey (Australia) Mark Noske	HSV Dealer Team	Holden Commodore VZ	113	Clutch	28	
DNF	50	(Australia) Owen Kelly (Australia) Nathan Pretty	Paul Weel Racing	Holden Commodore VZ	86	Driveline	21	
DNF	021	(New Zealand) John Faulkner (Australia) Alan Gurr	Team Kiwi Racing; Paul Morris Motorsport	Holden Commodore VZ	55	Engine	30	
DNF	45	(New Zealand) Mark Porter (New Zealand) Kayne Scott	Team Dynamik	Holden Commodore VZ	41	Engine	33	
DNS	44	(New Zealand) Simon Wills (Brazil) Max Wilson	Team Dynamik	Holden Commodore VZ		Crash in warm-up	16	

== Statistics ==
- Provisional pole position - #1 Marcos Ambrose - 1:10.6715
- Pole Position - #16 Garth Tander - 1:10.8917
- Fastest Lap - #888 Craig Lowndes - 1:11.7940
- Average Speed - 142 km/h
