= Grand Finale (V8 Supercars) =

(New South Wales) Grand Finale
- Race Information
Venue	Oran Park Raceway
Number of times held	8
First held	2001
Last held	2008
- Race Format
- Race 1
Laps	46
Distance	120 km
- Race 2
Laps	46
Distance	120 km
- Race 3
Laps	46
Distance	120 km
- Last Event (2008)
- Overall Winner
(Australia) Garth Tander	Holden Racing Team
- Race Winners
(Australia) Jamie Whincup	Triple Eight Race Engineering
(Australia) Garth Tander	Holden Racing Team
(Australia) Rick Kelly	HSV Dealer Team

The Grand Finale, also known as the V8 Ultimate and as The Main Event, was the auto race held as the final round of the V8 Supercar Championship Series from 2001 to 2008. In those years, it was held at Sandown Raceway, Eastern Creek Raceway, the Phillip Island Grand Prix Circuit and Oran Park Raceway.

== Format ==
The Grand Finale was staged over a weekend in either November or December each year. Free practice took place on Friday; qualifying sessions and the first of three races took place on Saturday; and the final two races took place on Sunday. The driver accumulating the most points over the weekend's races was deemed the winner of the event.

== History ==
=== Sandown ===
In 1999 and 2000, the Bathurst 1000 took place as the final round of the championship. Following Bathurst's move back to early October in 2001, and the decision to extend the championship calendar beyond the endurance events and into December, the final round of the season moved to Sandown Raceway. For the first time, the final round was given a designated name, and became known as the "V8 Ultimate". The inaugural 2001 event saw Todd Kelly score his first championship round win. In 2002, Marcos Ambrose gave the Ford AU Falcon a round win in the last event of its largely unsuccessful era. It was what would become the first of four consecutive round wins in the Grand Finale for Ambrose. In both 2001 and 2002, Mark Skaife had already secured the championship title before the final round of the series, and as such the V8 Ultimate was a dead rubber on each occasion. In 2003, the Sandown 500 was reinstated on the calendar as Sandown's round of the championship, and the final round moved to Eastern Creek in Sydney.

=== Eastern Creek ===
In the 2003 season, the final round was called "The Main Event". It was held at Eastern Creek Raceway and was won by Marcos Ambrose, who secured his first championship win in the process. The 2003 event is perhaps best remembered for an incident between Russell Ingall and Mark Skaife, which has since been dubbed the "race rage" incident or the "shriek at the creek". Ingall and Skaife made contact exiting Turn 9 which resulted in Skaife being spun into the wall. Having parked his damaged car on the other side of the track, Skaife remained next to his car, waiting for Ingall to return on the following lap. Skaife walked towards the edge of the circuit, shaking his fist at Ingall, and Ingall responded by swerving towards Skaife. Ingall was disqualified from the event and both drivers were fined. For 2004, the "Grand Finale" title was used for the first time, and Ambrose won the event for the third time in succession, again securing the championship on the same weekend. In both years, Eastern Creek also hosted a sprint round as well as the finale.

=== Phillip Island ===
The event moved to Phillip Island for 2005 and Ambrose again won the event, though Craig Lowndes won the first of the three races on this occasion. Ingall secured his first championship win at the event, having finished runner-up in the championship four times previously. In 2006, Rick Kelly led the championship by a small points margin over Lowndes. Following the first two races, in which Lowndes complained of being unfairly held up by Kelly's teammates, Kelly and Lowndes were tied on points. A controversial incident in the third race saw Kelly make contact with the back of Lowndes, sending Lowndes and Kelly's brother Todd into a spin. Lowndes was stranded in the middle of the track and was hit by Will Davison, sustaining steering damage which caused him to finish in thirty-first place. Despite receiving a drive-through penalty for his role in the incident and finishing eighteenth and a protest from Lowndes' team, Kelly was crowned champion.

The event decided the championship again in 2007, with Garth Tander and Jamie Whincup battling for the title. Tander won the event, winning two races, and secured the championship by two points over Whincup.

=== Oran Park ===
Oran Park Raceway hosted the event in 2008, having previously hosted the final round of the Australian Touring Car Championship in 1971–72, 1980 and from 1985 to 1998. Having been on the calendar each year since 1971, it was the circuit's final championship event before it was demolished for a housing redevelopment. Garth Tander again won the event but it was Whincup who sealed the championship, over Mark Winterbottom. Rick Kelly won the final race of the weekend for HSV Dealer Team, in what was also the final race for the successful team before they were disbanded. The event was Skaife's last as a full-time driver after having raced in the championship since 1987.

== Demise ==
The 2009 championship saw the Grand Finale replaced by the Sydney 500, held at the newly built Homebush Street Circuit around Sydney Olympic Park. This event itself was replaced by the Newcastle 500 for 2017.

== Winners ==
Year	Event title	Driver	Team	Car	Circuit
2001	Australian V8 Ultimate	(Australia) Todd Kelly	Kmart Racing Team	Holden VX Commodore	Sandown Raceway
2002	Betta Electrical V8 Ultimate	(Australia) Marcos Ambrose	Stone Brothers Racing	Ford AU Falcon	Sandown Raceway
2003	The Main Event presented by VIP Petfoods	(Australia) Marcos Ambrose	Stone Brothers Racing	Ford BA Falcon	Eastern Creek Raceway
2004	BigPond Grand Finale	(Australia) Marcos Ambrose	Stone Brothers Racing	Ford BA Falcon	Eastern Creek Raceway
2005	BigPond Grand Finale	(Australia) Marcos Ambrose	Stone Brothers Racing	Ford BA Falcon	Phillip Island Grand Prix Circuit
2006	Caterpillar Grand Finale	(Australia) Todd Kelly	Holden Racing Team	Holden VZ Commodore	Phillip Island Grand Prix Circuit
2007	Dunlop Grand Finale	(Australia) Garth Tander	HSV Dealer Team	Holden VE Commodore	Phillip Island Grand Prix Circuit
2008	NRMA Motoring and Services Grand Finale	(Australia) Garth Tander	Holden Racing Team	Holden VE Commodore	Oran Park Raceway

== Multiple winners ==
=== By driver ===
Wins	Driver	Years
4	(Australia) Marcos Ambrose	2002, 2003, 2004, 2005
2	(Australia) Todd Kelly	2001, 2006
2	(Australia) Garth Tander	2007, 2008

=== By team ===
Wins	Team
4	Stone Brothers Racing
2	HSV Dealer Team^{1}
2	Holden Racing Team

=== By manufacturer ===
Wins	Manufacturer
4	Ford
4	Holden

Notes

- ^1 – The HSV Dealer Team was known as Kmart Racing Team from 2001 to 2004, hence their statistics are combined.

== Event sponsors ==
- 2002: Betta Electrical
- 2003: VIP Petfoods
- 2004–05: BigPond
- 2006: Caterpillar
- 2007: Dunlop
- 2008: NRMA Motoring and Services

== See also ==
- List of Australian Touring Car Championship races
