= Ford Falcon (BA) =

Australian full-size car

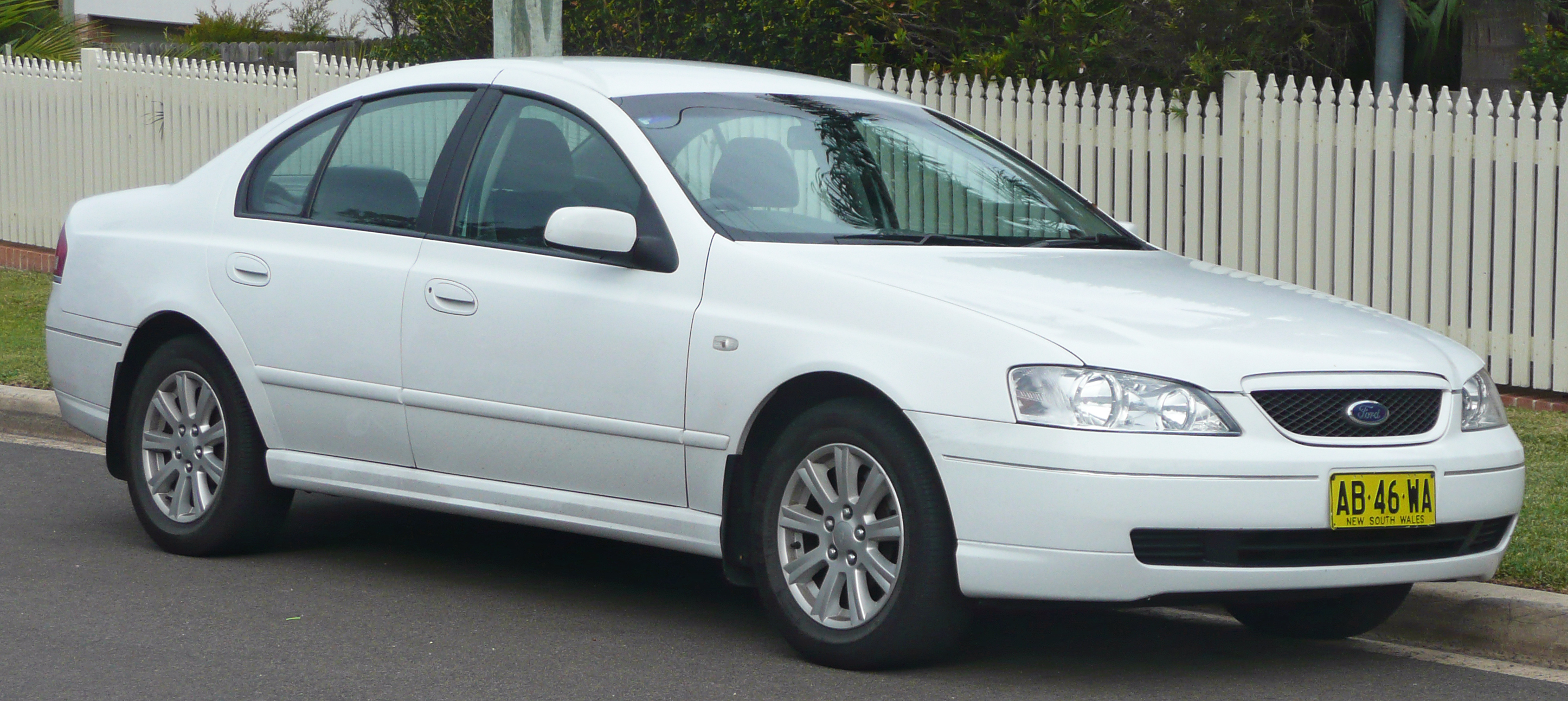
- Ford Falcon (BA II) Futura sedan

Overview
- Manufacturer: Ford Australia
- Production: September 2002 – October 2005
- Assembly: Australia: Melbourne, Victoria (Broadmeadows)
- Designer: Graham Wadsworth

Body and chassis
- Class: Full-size car
- Body style: 2-door cab chassis 2-door coupe utility 4-door sedan 5-door station wagon
- Layout: Front engine, rear-wheel drive layout
- Platform: Ford EA169
- Related: Ford Fairlane; Ford Fairmont; Ford Territory

Powertrain
- Engine: 4.0 L Barra 182 I6 (petrol); 4.0 L Barra 240T I6 T (petrol); 4.0 L Barra E-Gas I6 (LPG); 5.4 L Barra 220 V8 (petrol); 5.4 L Boss 260 V8 (petrol)
- Transmission: 4-speed BTR automatic 5-speed BW/Tremec T-5 manual 6-speed BW/Tremec T-56 manual

Dimensions
- Wheelbase: 2,829–2,921 mm (111.4–115.0 in)
- Length: 4,916–5,053 mm (193.5–198.9 in)
- Width: 1,864 mm (73.4 in)
- Height: 1,444 mm (56.9 in)
- Kerb weight: 1,620–1,740 kg (3,570–3,840 lb)

Chronology
- Predecessor: Ford Falcon (AU)
- Successor: Ford Falcon (BF)

The Ford Falcon (BA) is a full-sized car produced from 2002 to 2005 by Ford Australia. It was the second, and significantly re-engineered iteration of the sixth generation of the Falcon, and also included a luxury variant, the Fairmont. It formed the basis for the Ford Territory—a crossover SUV, which debuted in 2004.

To address the relatively poor reception of the preceding AU series, the BA series was heavily updated for launch in September 2002—the same time as its biggest rival, the Holden Commodore (VY). It featured a substantially revised and more conservative exterior styling, with every panel new except for the carry-over door skins. Interiors, too, were substantially revised, while mechanically, a new independent rear suspension setup was fitted to all sedan derivatives and the engine and transmissions received extensive upgrades. In October 2004, Ford introduced a Mark II update, bringing subtle styling and mechanical changes, and in October 2005, replaced the BA with the BF.

In the final months of 2002, the BA model received the influential Wheels Car of the Year award, breaking a 36-year drought. The BA also won four consecutive Australia's Best Cars awards, spanning three years. The model's market share briefly topped that of its chief competitor, the Holden Commodore on two occasions, but have failed to match those of the record-breaking EL Falcon.

== Development and design ==
The BA model represented a A$500 million investment, and 24,000 hours of engine and durability testing. Germany's Nürburgring test track was used for some suspension testing. The anti-lock brakes and electronic stability control were calibrated in Sweden, as well as Australia.

=== Exterior design ===
Exterior styling was led by design director Scott Strong, then chief designer for Ford Australia. After Strong departed from operations at Ford in 2001, Simon Butterworth took over this role. Ford Australia's intention was to create a European influence for the vehicle, whereby most aspects of the AU's "New Edge" design would be revised. The result was a significant update of the existing AU body shell, rather than a completely new design. The BA model introduced an integrated aerial in the car's rear window, instead of the conventional retractable antenna. The aerial placement improved the vehicle's aerodynamics and ended the breakage issues that had plagued the retractable type found on previous models. Interference from the engine did not affect the radio reception.

=== Interior design ===
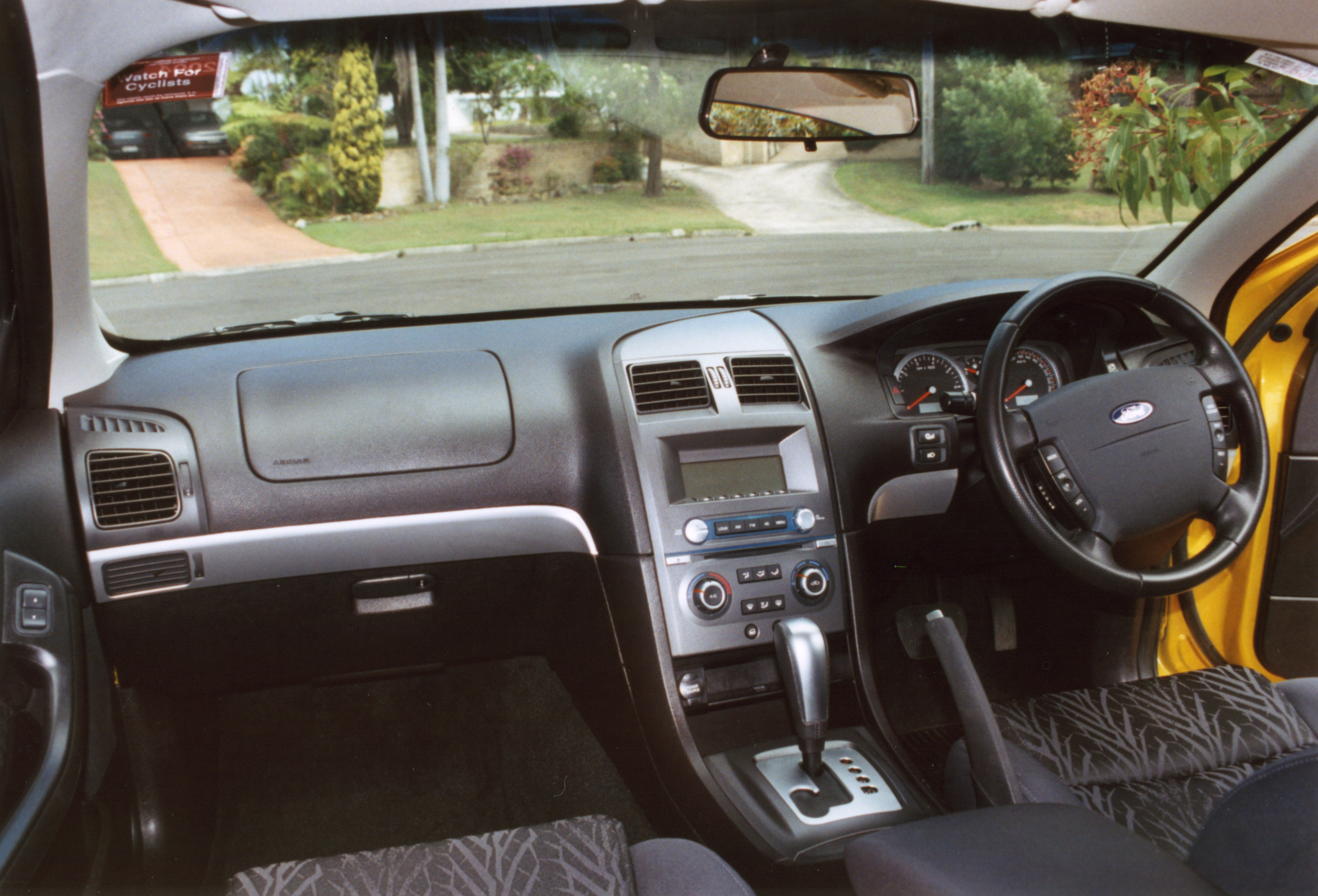
Interior

From the inside, the "New Edge" interior of the AU was discarded in favour of a contemporary style, based upon European designs. Marcus Hotblack, the director of interior design, focused on improving user friendliness. The resulting design was an ergonomically-correct interior command centre, highlighted by the satin-finish centre console. The theme was further extended by the audio and cruise control switches' location on the steering wheel.

A prominent feature of the new command centre was a large liquid crystal display which displayed information regarding the air conditioning unit and sound system. Buyers could opt for a premium sound package, standard on the Fairmont Ghia, which included a full-colour screen. Ventilation outlets were larger than those of previous models, resulting in a cabin that could be more effectively and efficiently heated or cooled. Another change was the headlamp switch, which was now located on the end of the turn signal stalk for easier reach.

Interior colour schemes varied from model to model, but shared a common design approach. The entry-level XT featured a black plastic panel for the upper half of the dashboard, with either a black, charcoal, or beige panel for the lower half. Not all variants offered the distinctive colour palette; the sports variants could not be optioned with the two-tone interior.

== Powertrain ==
Powerplants consisted of both straight sixes and V8s, with the entry-level Barra 182 six-cylinder being a significant improvement over the AU Falcon's six. The base model engine contained substantial mechanical changes such as dual infinitely variable cam timing for a gain of 25 kW (34 hp) of power for a total of 182 kW (244 hp). The Barra 182 can also take advantage of higher octane fuels, where a small increase of torque can be achieved. The 156 kW (209 hp) LPG-only Barra E-Gas engine was offered as an option on lower specification models.

A turbocharged variant of the Barra engine was introduced in a new XR6 Turbo model and produced 240 kW (320 hp) of power. A 5.4-litre V8 replaced the Windsor engine of the AU. The new V8 was a modified version of Ford's Modular V8, available in two variants: the Barra 220 generating 220 kW (300 hp) and a 260 kW (350 hp) Boss 260.

Two transmissions were available for the BA—a four-speed automatic and a five-speed manual, both floor-mounted. The automatic unit featured Sequential Sports Shift, a first for the Falcon nameplate in Australia. Utility body styles were also available with an optional column-mounted automatic shifter (without Sequential Sports Shift) in lieu of the floor-mounted system also offered. The new Control-Blade independent rear suspension (IRS) fitted to all sedans—first used in development of the Ford Focus and the Jaguar X-Type— was superior to the optional double wishbone IRS suspension used on AU sedans, and was cheaper. However, it was heavier than the previous live rear axle used for base models, and the change contributed to the base model XT sedan's 130-kilogram (287 lb) weight increase from the previous model. The wagons and utilities retained the leaf spring live axle rear suspension of the AU wagon and utility; consequently, they did not gain as much weight as the sedan.

The BA Falcon was also smoother on the road, with increased towing capabilities from previous models. Fuel consumption in the Barra 182 was measured at 12.5 L/100 km (18.8 mpg_{‑US}) for city driving and 8.2 L/100 km (29 mpg_{‑US}) for highway driving. These numbers were government figures, measured indoors using a dynamometer. Real-world testing has shown that an extra 12% is actually consumed.

Powertrains
Engine	Power	Torque	Transmission	
Engine	Power	Torque	Manual	Automatic
4.0 L Barra 182 I6 (petrol)	182 kW (244 hp)	380 N⋅m (280 lb⋅ft)	5-speed BorgWarner/Tremec T5 manual	4-speed BTR M93LE automatic
4.0 L Barra E-Gas I6 (LPG)	156 kW (209 hp)	372 N⋅m (274 lb⋅ft)	5-speed BorgWarner/Tremec T5 manual	4-speed BTR M93LE automatic
4.0 L Barra 240T I6 Turbo (petrol)	240 kW (320 hp)	450 N⋅m (330 lb⋅ft)	5-speed BorgWarner/Tremec T5Z manual	4-speed BTR M95LE automatic
5.4 L Barra 220 V8 (petrol)	220 kW (300 hp)	470 N⋅m (350 lb⋅ft)	5-speed Tremec TR-3650 manual (BA); 6-speed Borg-Warner T-56 manual (BA II)	4-speed BTR M97LE automatic
5.4 L Boss 260 V8 (petrol)	260 kW (350 hp)	500 N⋅m (370 lb⋅ft)	5-speed Tremec TR-3650 manual (BA); 6-speed Borg-Warner T-56 manual (BA II)	4-speed BTR M97LE automatic

== Safety ==
Passenger safety was a key design aspect for the Ford engineers. Anti-lock brakes were standard on all models; electronic brakeforce distribution was also standard on most variants. The addition of traction control for higher trim levels helped to prevent loss of traction. On top of this, dual front airbags were a standard fitment across the range; side-impact airbags were equipped on higher luxury levels such as the Fairmont. In a crash safety assessment conducted by ANCAP, the BA model scored 27.27 out of a possible 37 points, giving a rating of four out of five stars.

ANCAP test results* Ford Falcon XT sedan (2002)
Test	Score
Overall	4 /5 stars
Frontal offset	11.82/16
Side impact	14.45/16
Pole	Not Assessed
Seat belt reminders	1/3
Whiplash protection	Not Assessed
Pedestrian protection	Poor
Electronic stability control	Not Assessed

ANCAP test results* Ford Falcon Ute variants with driver airbag (2004)
Test	Score
Overall	4 /5 stars
Frontal offset	10.56/16
Side impact	14.36/16
Pole	Not Assessed
Seat belt reminders	1/3
Whiplash protection	Not Assessed
Pedestrian protection	Poor
Electronic stability control	Not Assessed

== Model range ==
=== Falcon XT ===
Marketed largely towards the fleet industry, the entry-level Falcon XT sold in the most numbers. Featuring the base Barra 182 six-cylinder engine, air conditioning, front power windows, and five-speed manual transmission, with the choice of a four-speed automatic, the XT was sold in sedan and station wagon body types. The Barra 220 V8 engine was available as an option. Judges of the Australia's Best Cars awards crowned the XT Best Family Car in 2002, and again in 2004, with the Futura receiving the award in 2003.

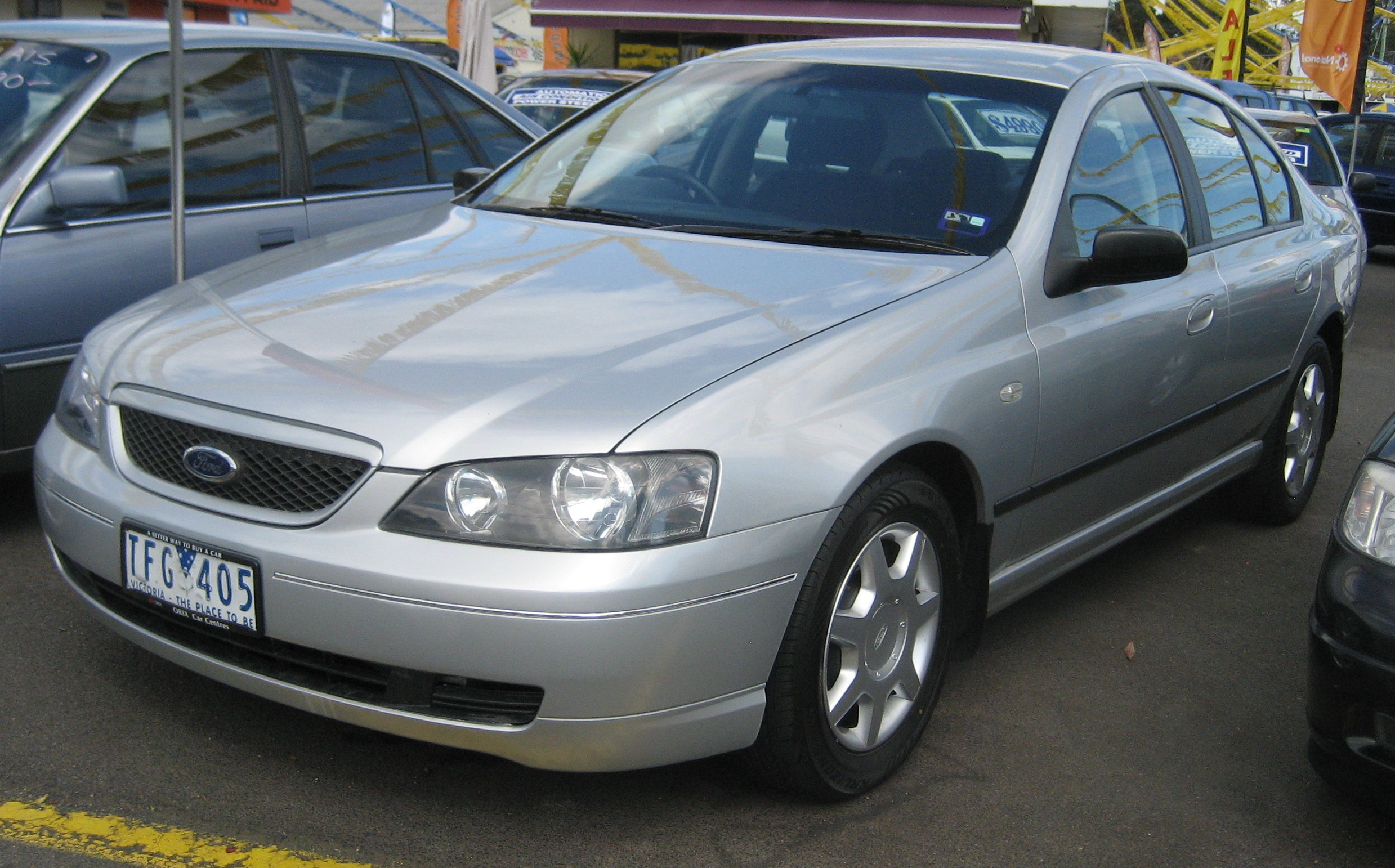
BA Falcon XT sedan

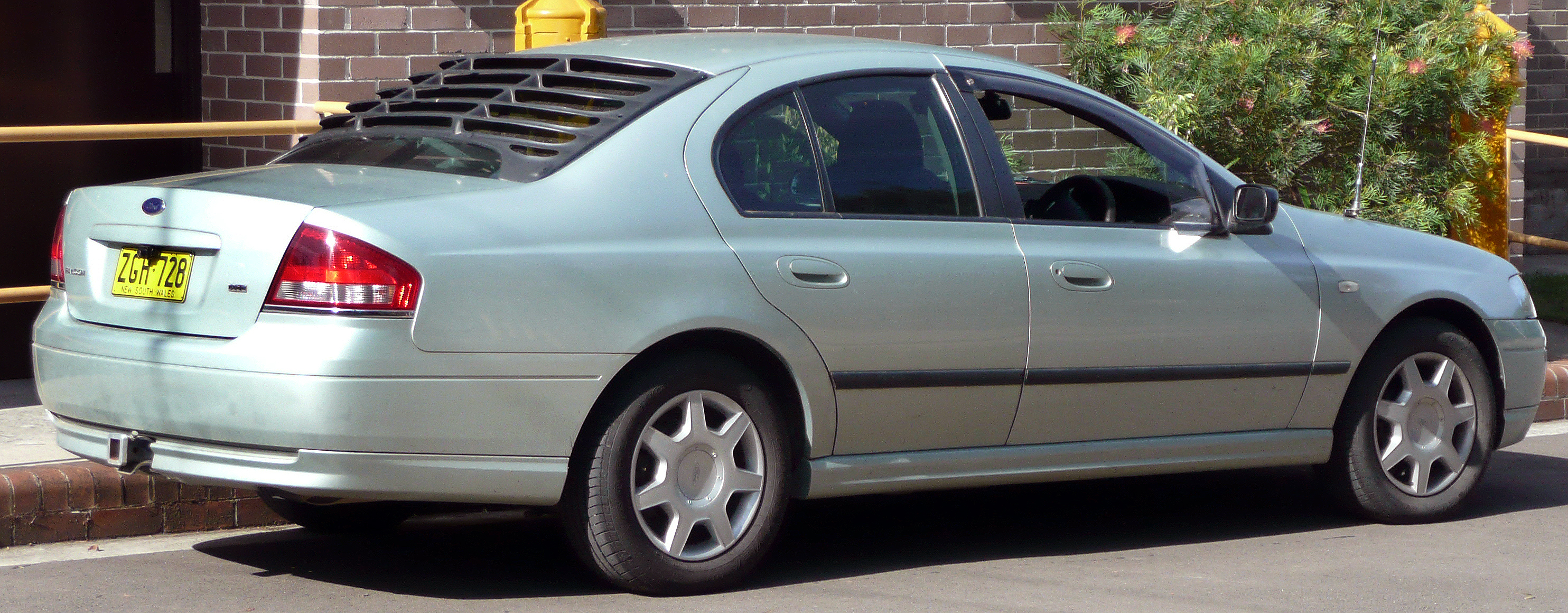
BA Falcon XT sedan

=== Futura ===
The semi-luxury Futura variant was heavily based on the XT, and marketed towards families. Futura models gained cruise control, 16-inch alloy wheels, rear power windows and full body-coloured side-view mirrors and side-protection moldings. But, side-impact airbags and power adjustable pedals were only available as options. Sedan and wagon models were available.

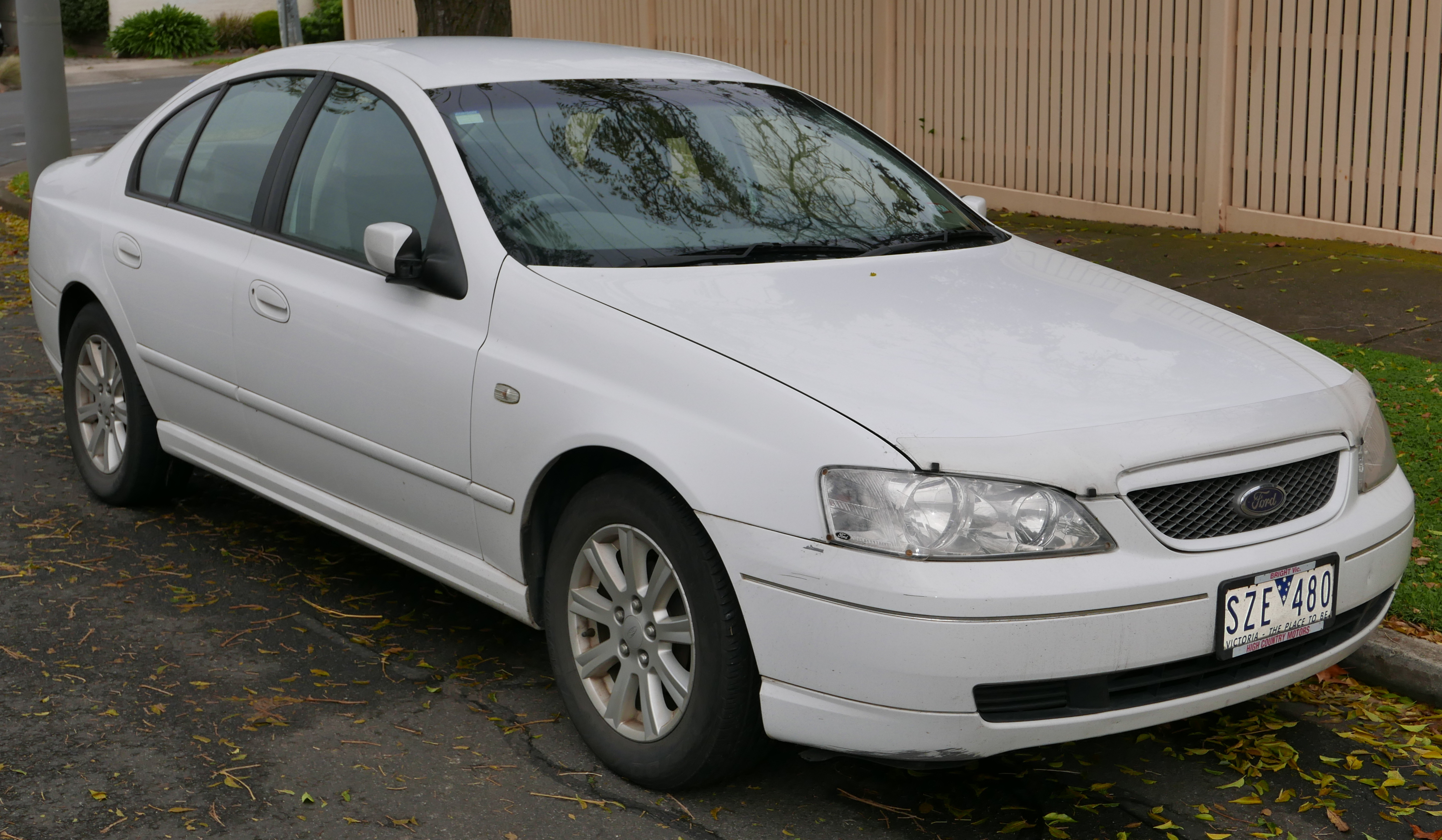
BA Falcon Futura sedan

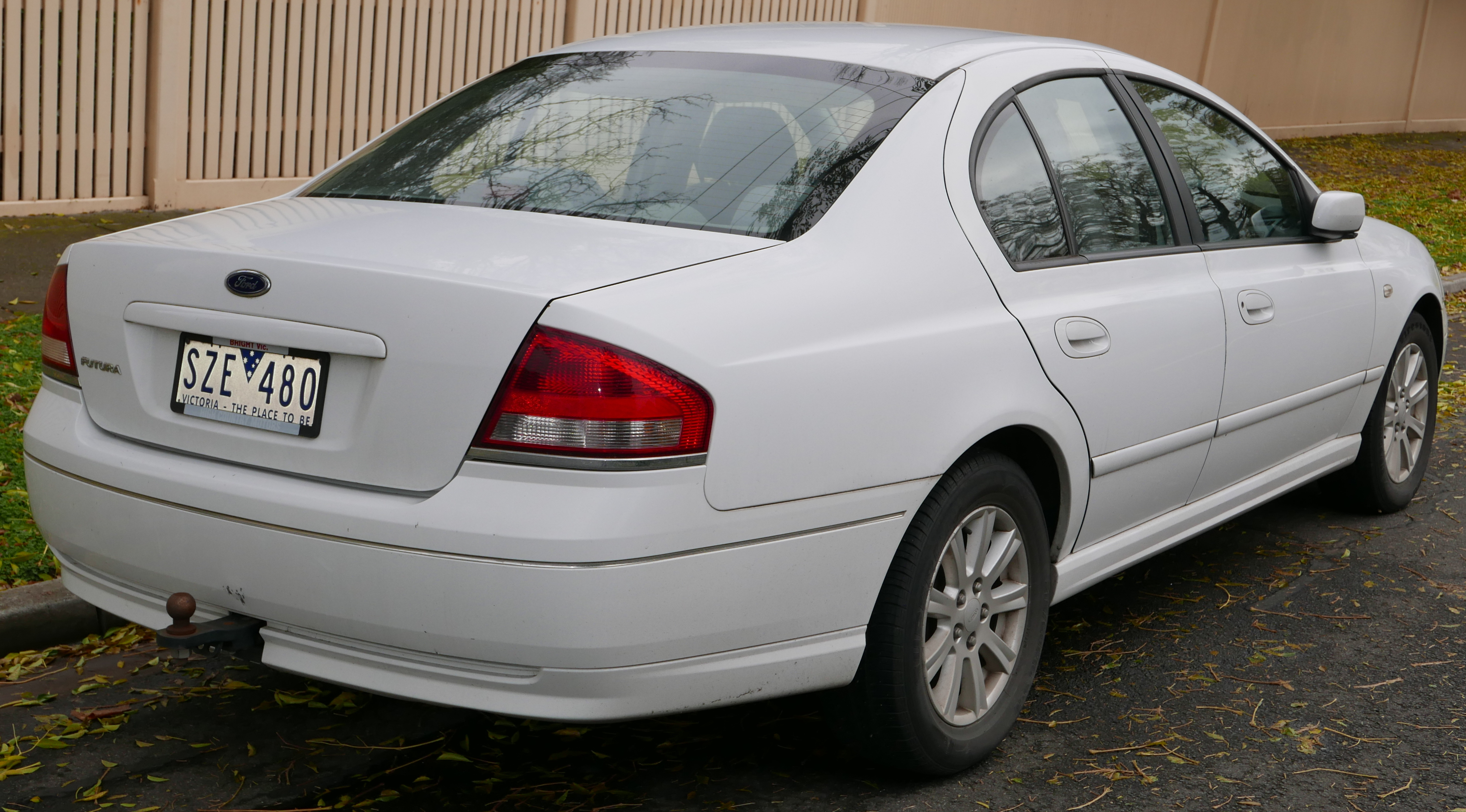
BA Falcon Futura sedan

=== Falcon XR6 ===
Building on the features of the XT, Ford Australia at one point considered not releasing the sports-oriented Falcon XR6 because of the new XR6 Turbo model. However, Ford overturned this decision before production. A specifically designed body kit distinguished the XR6 from other variants, except for the XR6 Turbo and XR8 which shared the sports bodywork. The naturally aspirated engine was identical to the engine used on the XT and Futura, and the five-speed manual transmission came as standard.

The newly introduced Falcon XR6 Turbo (XR6T) received critical acclaim at launch, and the Australia's Best Car's judges even awarded it the Best Sports car under $57,000 in 2002. At heart visually identical to the XR6, the turbocharged derivative gained extra features, with the additional turbocharger boosting the car's total power output to 240 kW (320 hp). The turbocharger is a Garrett GT35/40 unit.

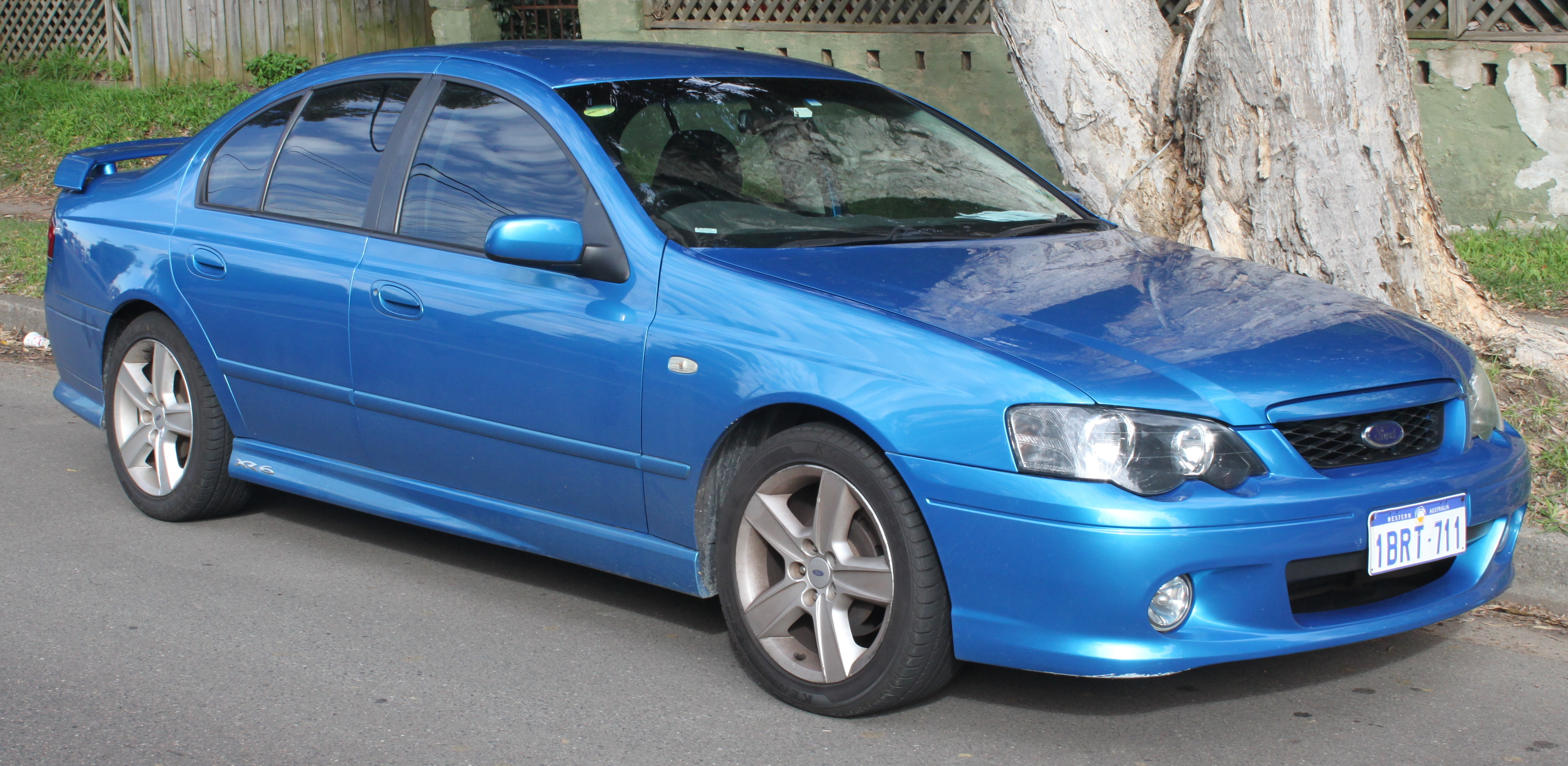
BA Falcon XR6 sedan

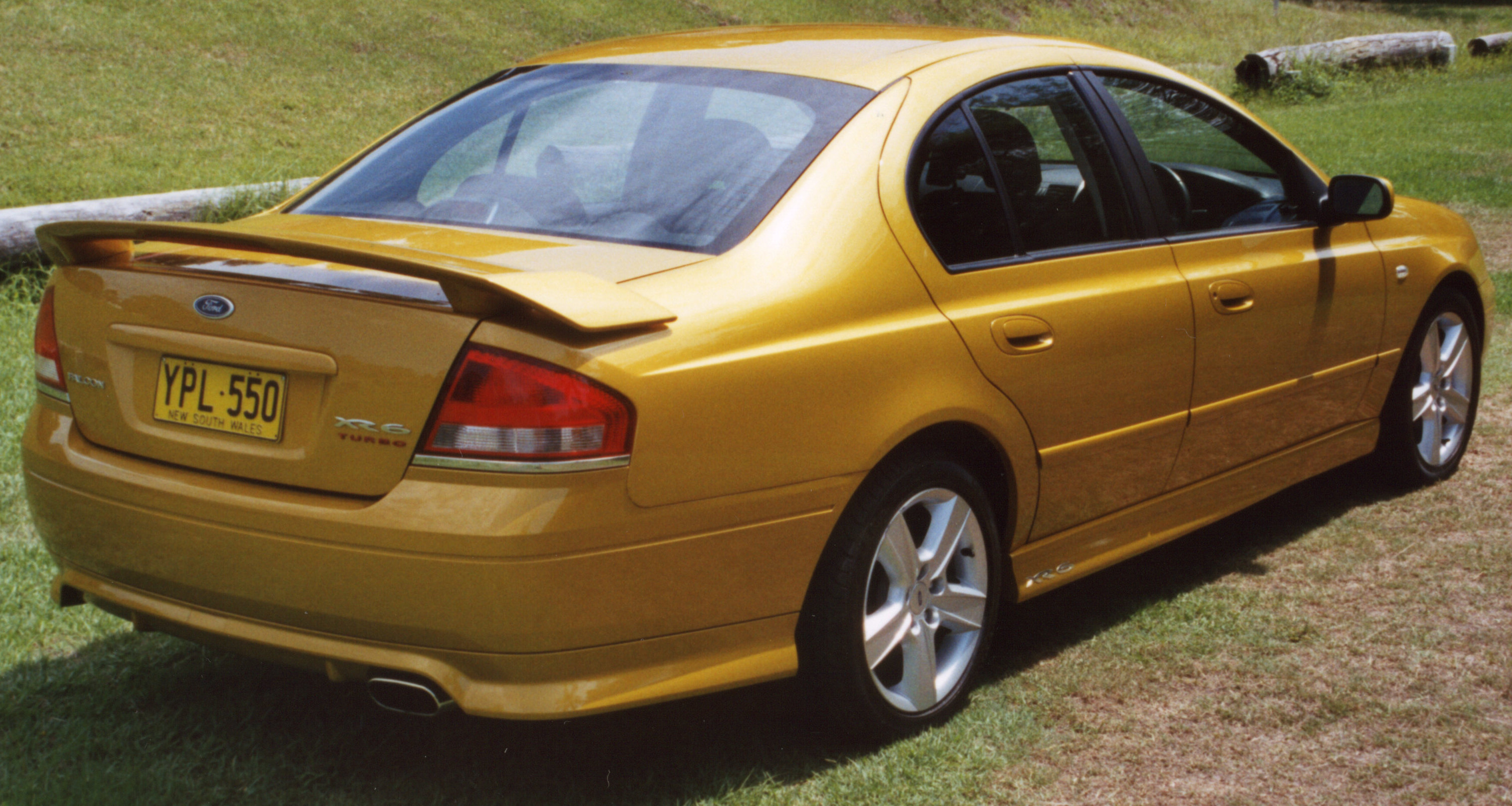
BA Falcon XR6 Turbo sedan

=== Falcon XR8 ===
Being the flagship sports variant, the XR8 credited specially tuned sports suspension, seating trim displaying the "XR" insignia, 17-inch wheels and the new 5.4-litre Boss 260 engine, outputting 30 percent more power than the previous model.

=== Fairmont ===
The Fairmont model opened up the luxury sector for the BA range. Externally, the Fairmont could be distinguished from the other BA models with its 16-inch alloy wheels and grey mesh grille with chrome surround. Some of the standard features included traction control and dual-zone climate control air conditioning, an analogue clock on the top centre console stack, wood grain highlights, and velour upholstery. Automatic headlights, which turn off or on depending on surrounding environmental conditions, were now standard on the Fairmont model. In addition to this, the Fairmont also received illuminated footwells. The basic mechanical setup carried over from the XT, although buyers could opt for the Barra 220 V8 engine.

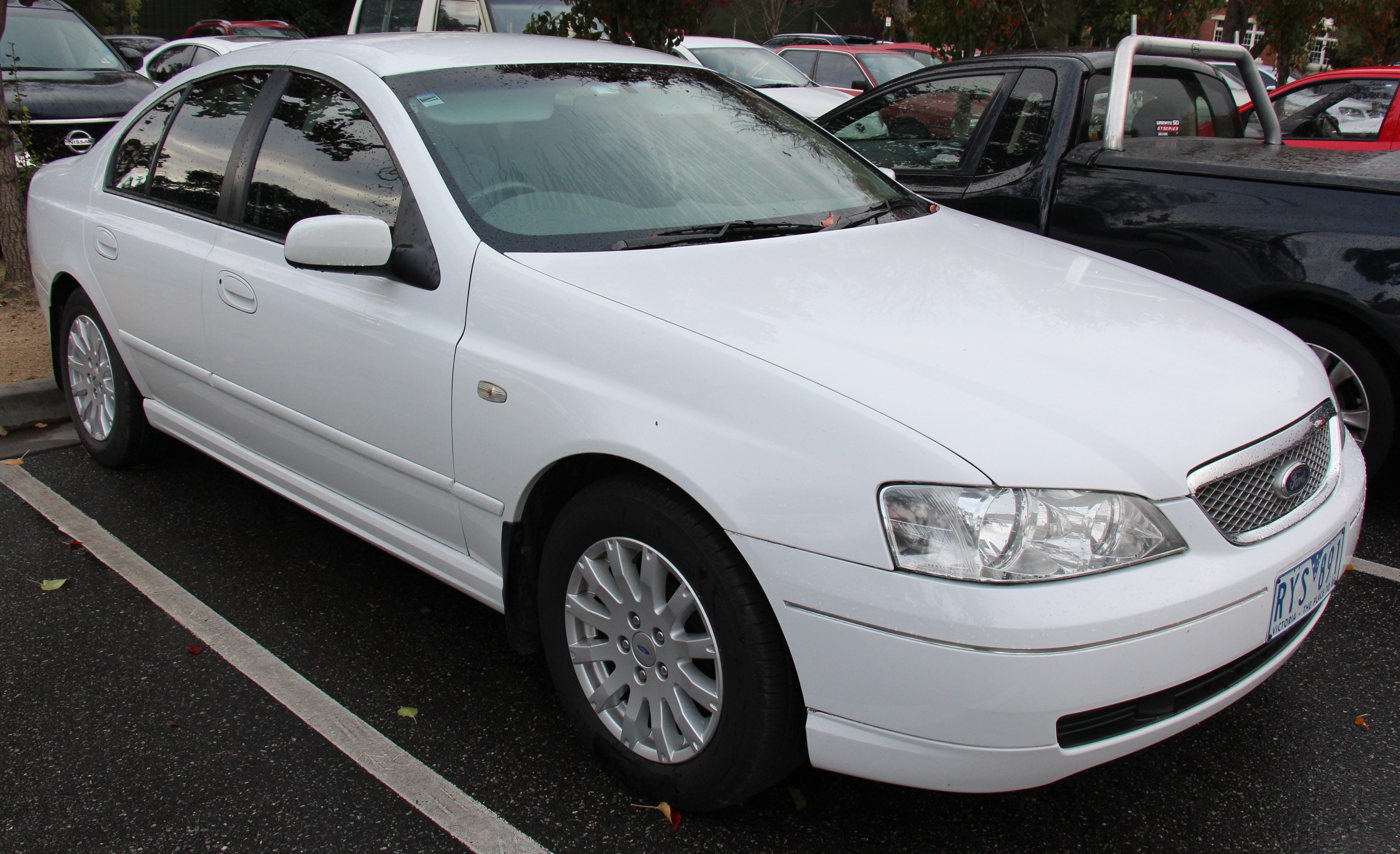
BA Fairmont sedan

=== Fairmont Ghia ===
By far the most expensive variant in the BA range, the Fairmont Ghia featured leather upholstery, wood grain highlights, full power options and a unique suspension assembly. The premium sound system, which incorporated a full-colour LCD screen, was standard, and the centre console stack was characterised by an analogue clock. Reverse parking sensors were available for the first time in the BA, standard on the Ghia. The sensors feature an automatic turn-off function for use when towing a boat or trailer for example.

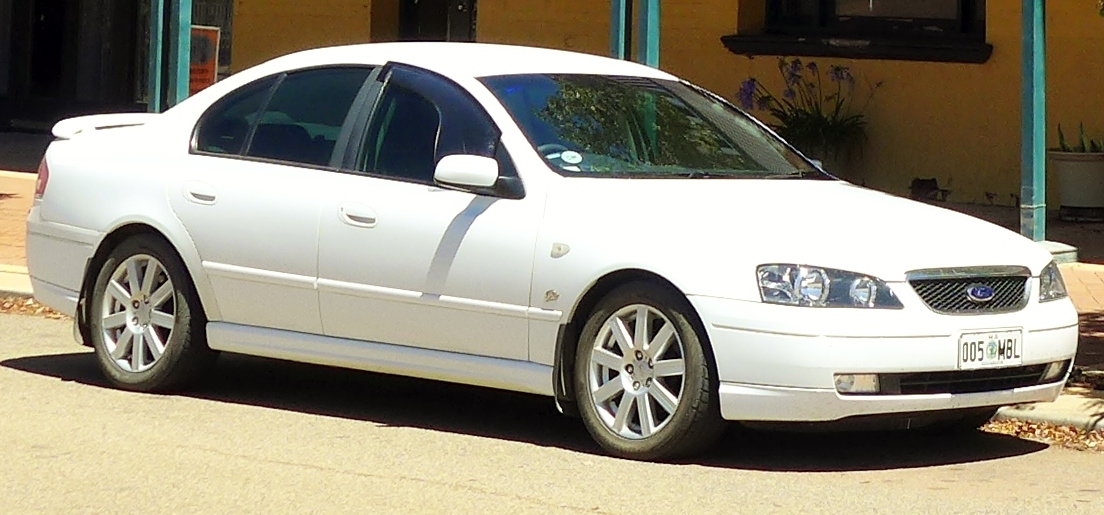
BA Fairmont Ghia sedan

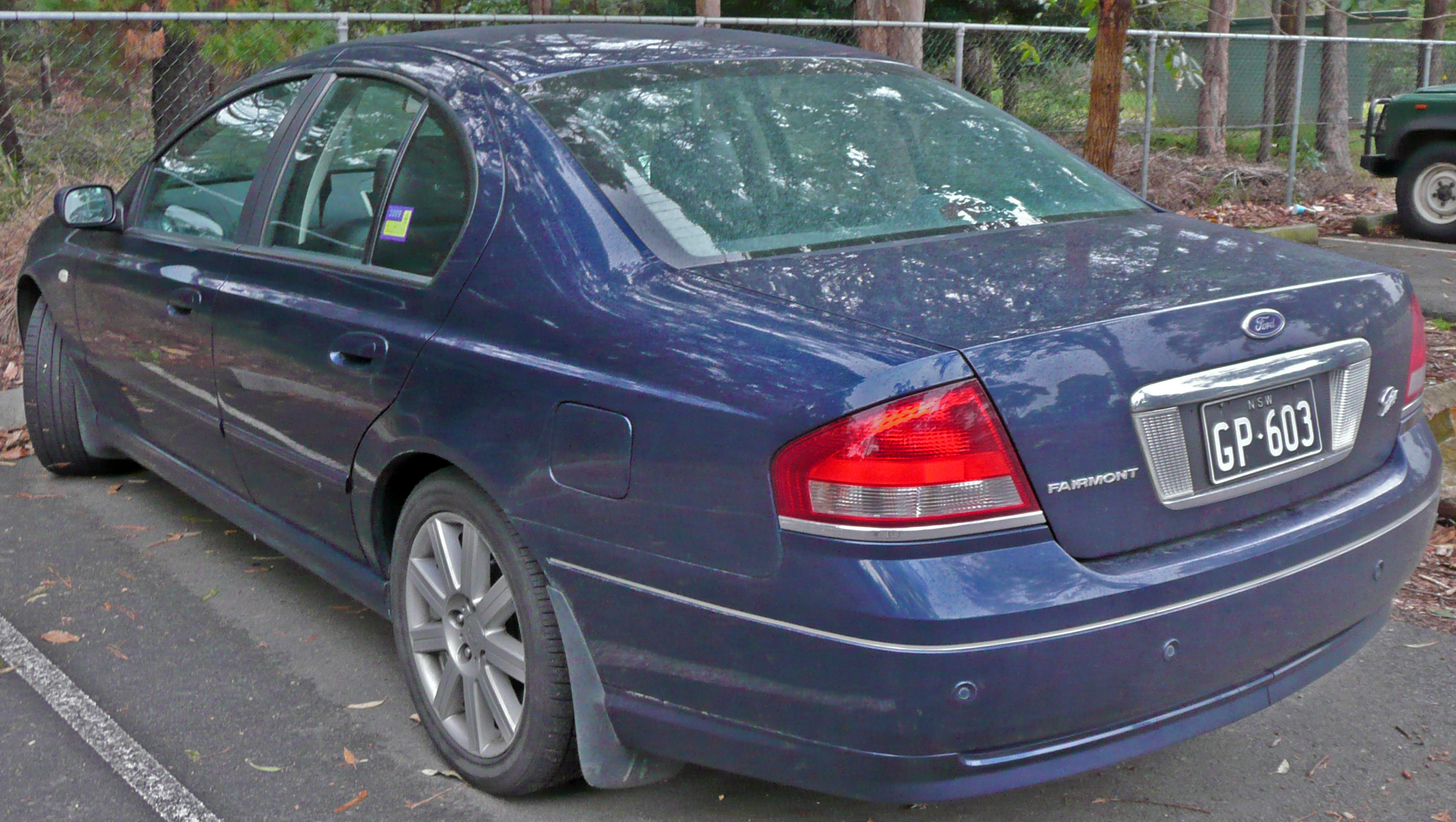
BA Fairmont Ghia sedan

=== Falcon Ute ===
The BA series Falcon utility was introduced in October 2002 in six model guises.

- XL Cab Chassis
- XL Wellbody
- XLS Cab Chassis
- XLS Wellbody
- XR6 Wellbody
- XR6 Turbo

These were later joined by two additional models:

- XR8: reintroduced to the range early in 2003 (last seen in the previous AU III series).
- RTV: was released in September 2003. The name "RTV" stood for "Rugged Terrain Vehicle" and featured an increased ride height, additional underbody protection, a lockable rear differential, a unique grille, flared guards and 16-inch alloy wheels. Originally dubbed "Hi-Ride" prior to release, in early 2003 Ford Australia held a competition to find a name for this variant, with "RTV" announced as the winning entrant in July.
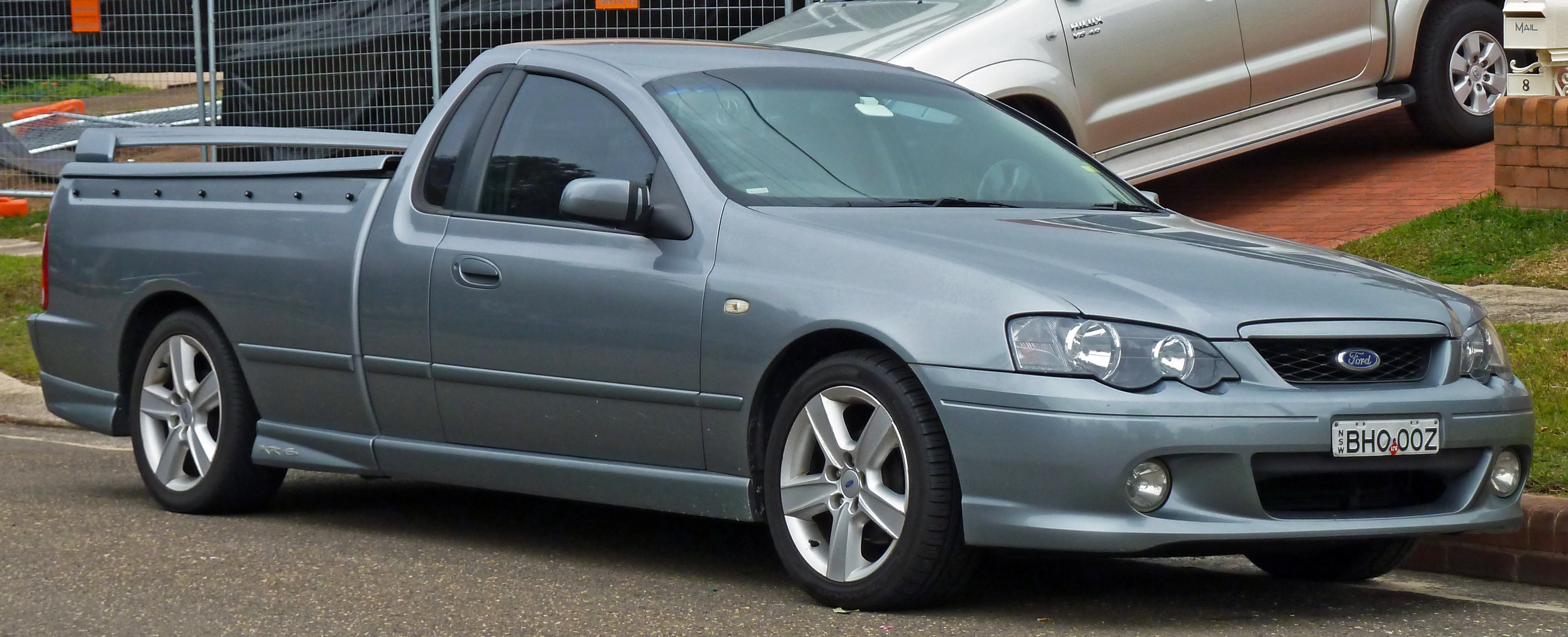
BA Falcon XR6 utility

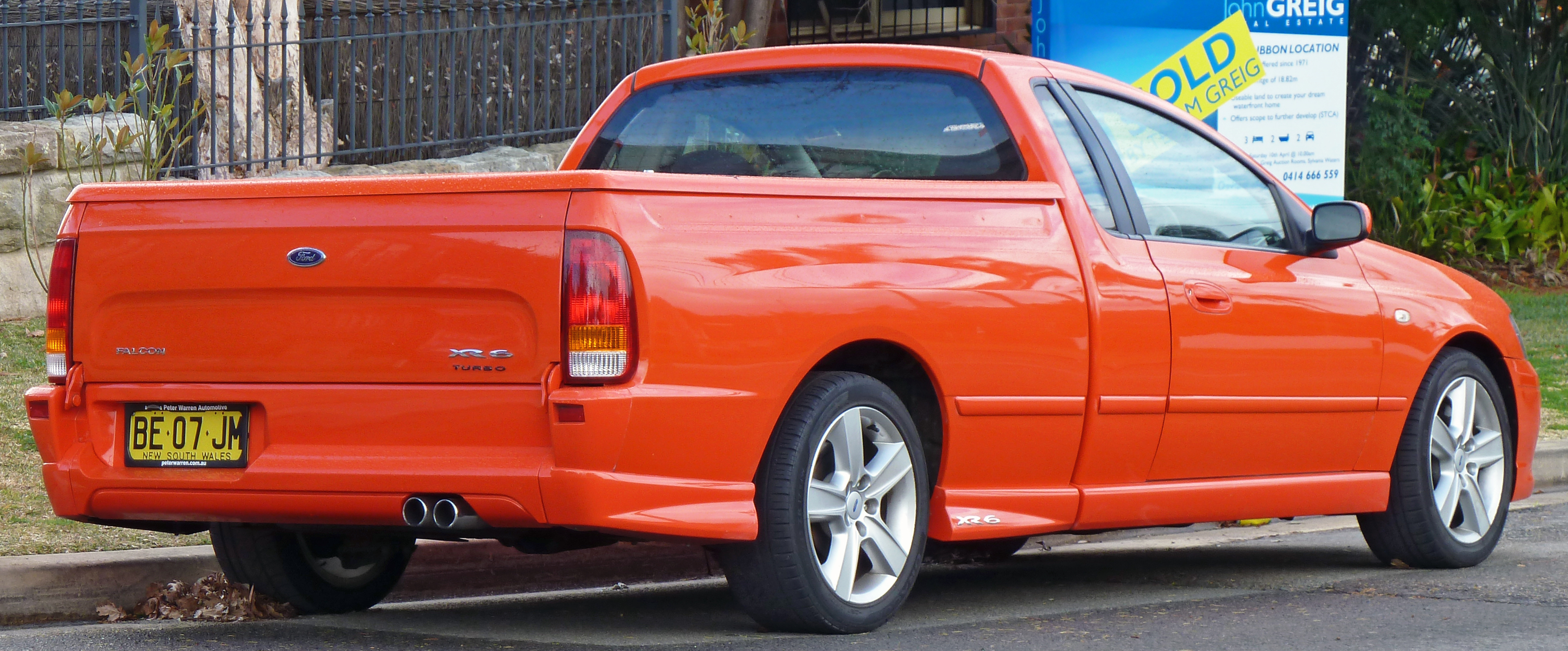
BA Falcon XR6 Turbo utility

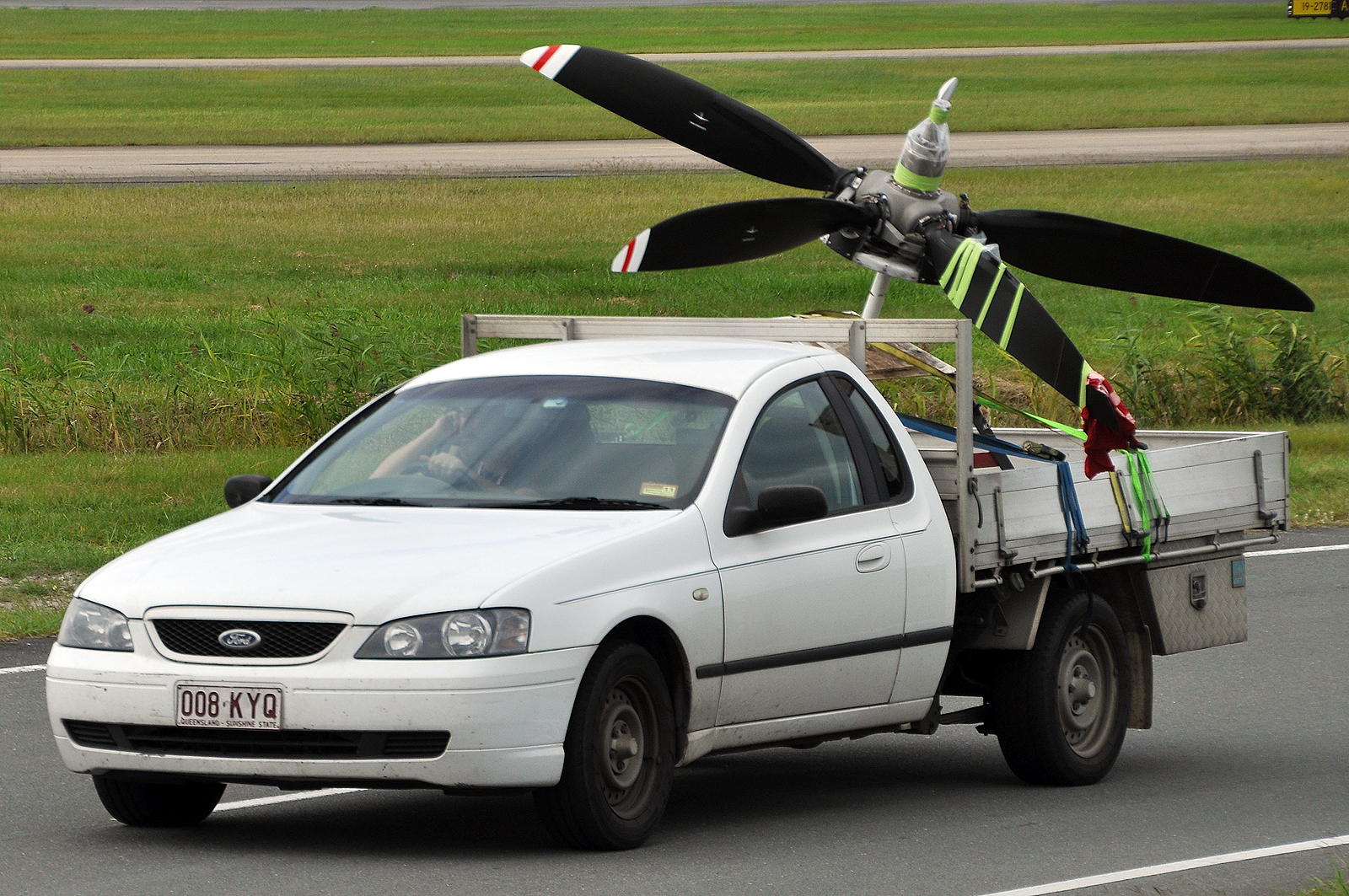
BA Falcon XLS cab chassis

== Model changes ==
=== Mk II ===
Ford released the Mk II (BA II) Falcon in October 2004 to maintain sales interest until the 2005 introduction of the BF update. Modifications included some cosmetic changes and a new six-speed Tremec T56 manual transmission replacing the five-speed on XR6 Turbo and XR8 models.

The Mk II XT included the following changes over the Mk I: MKII badge, wider spokes on the hubcaps, auto headlights, cruise control standard, and a different cup holder.

The Futura model gained power adjustable pedals, and side airbags, with a DVD entertainment system being offered on upmarket trim levels. The XR8 sedan variant also received the premium audio system.

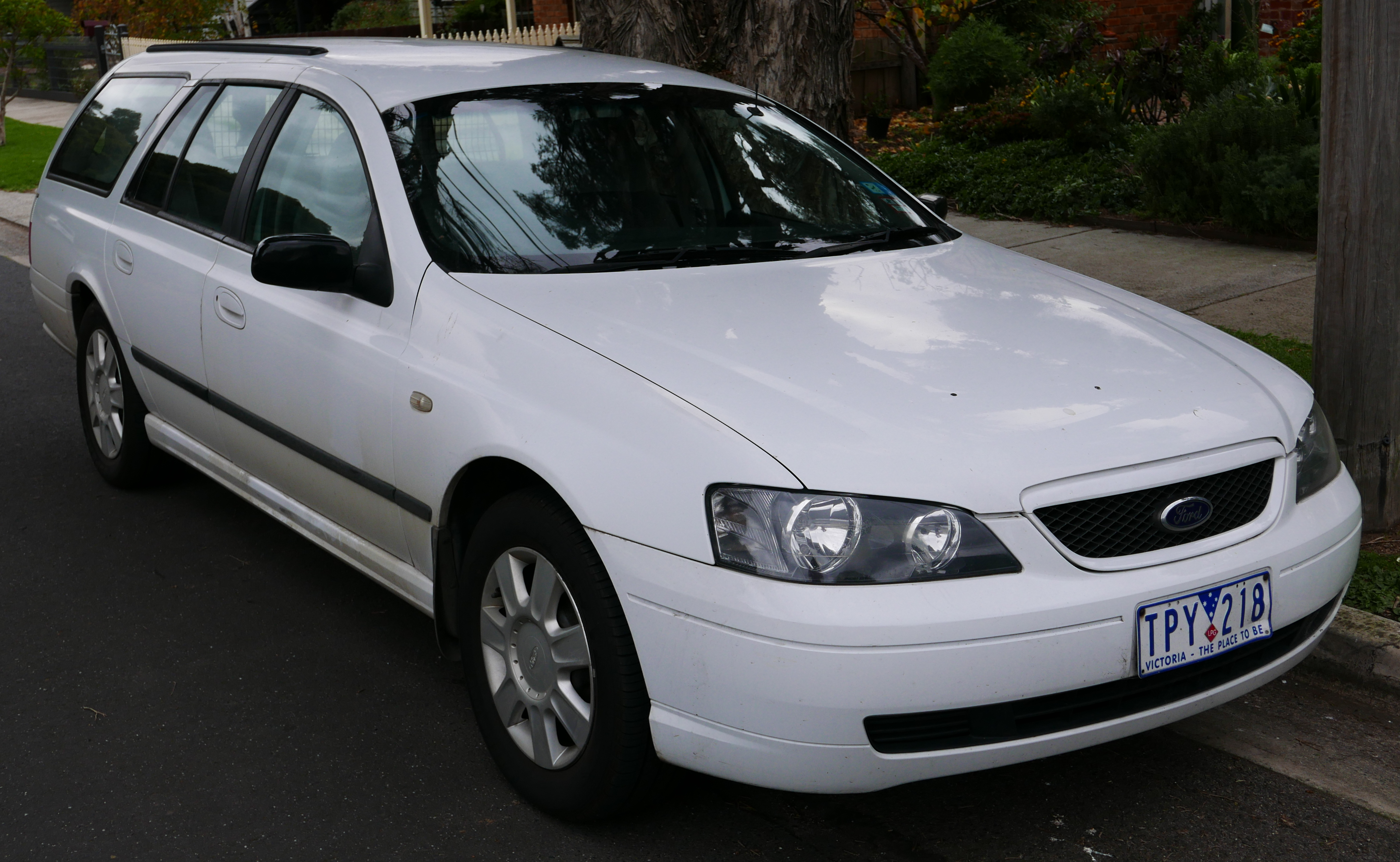
BA II XT station wagon

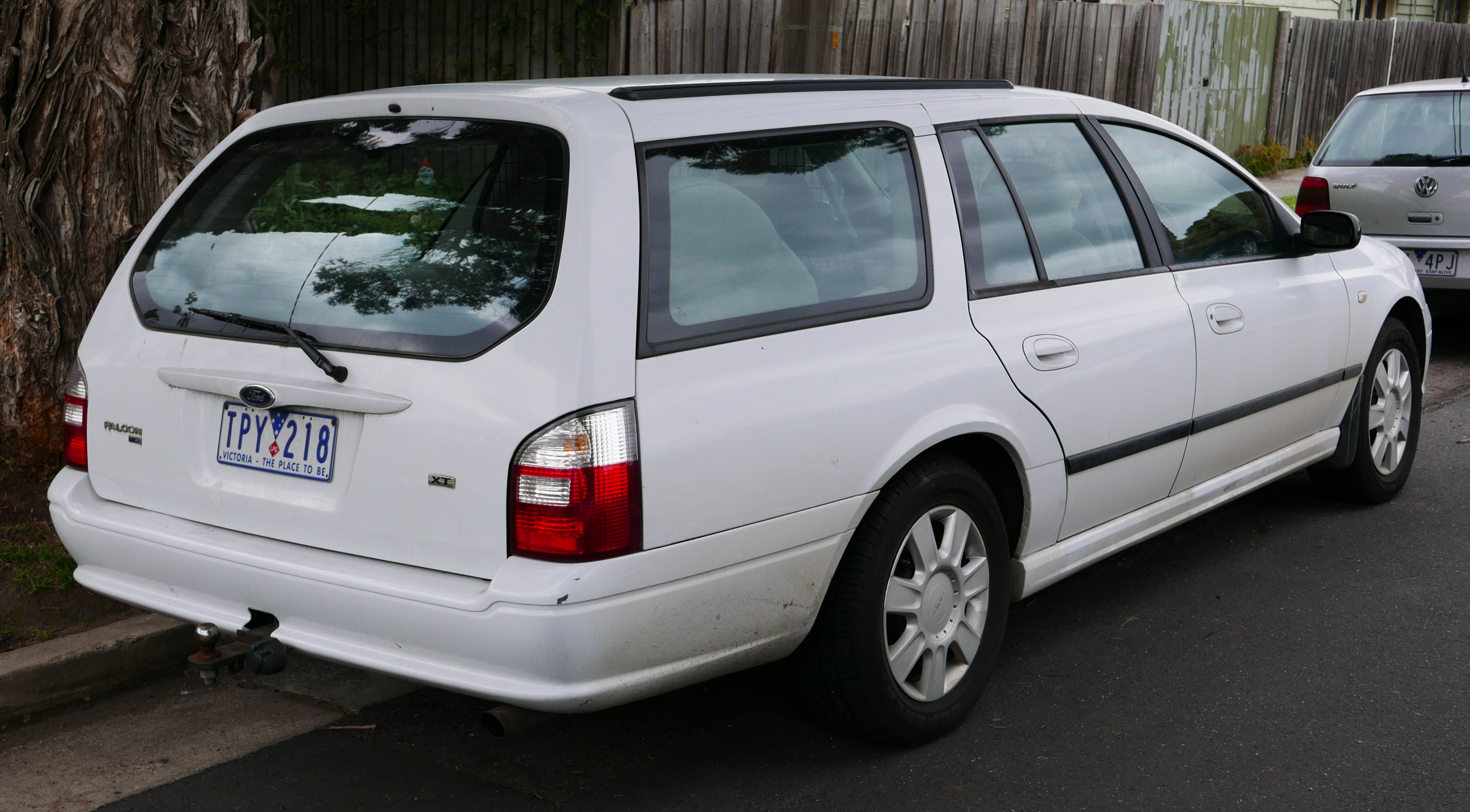
BA II XT station wagon

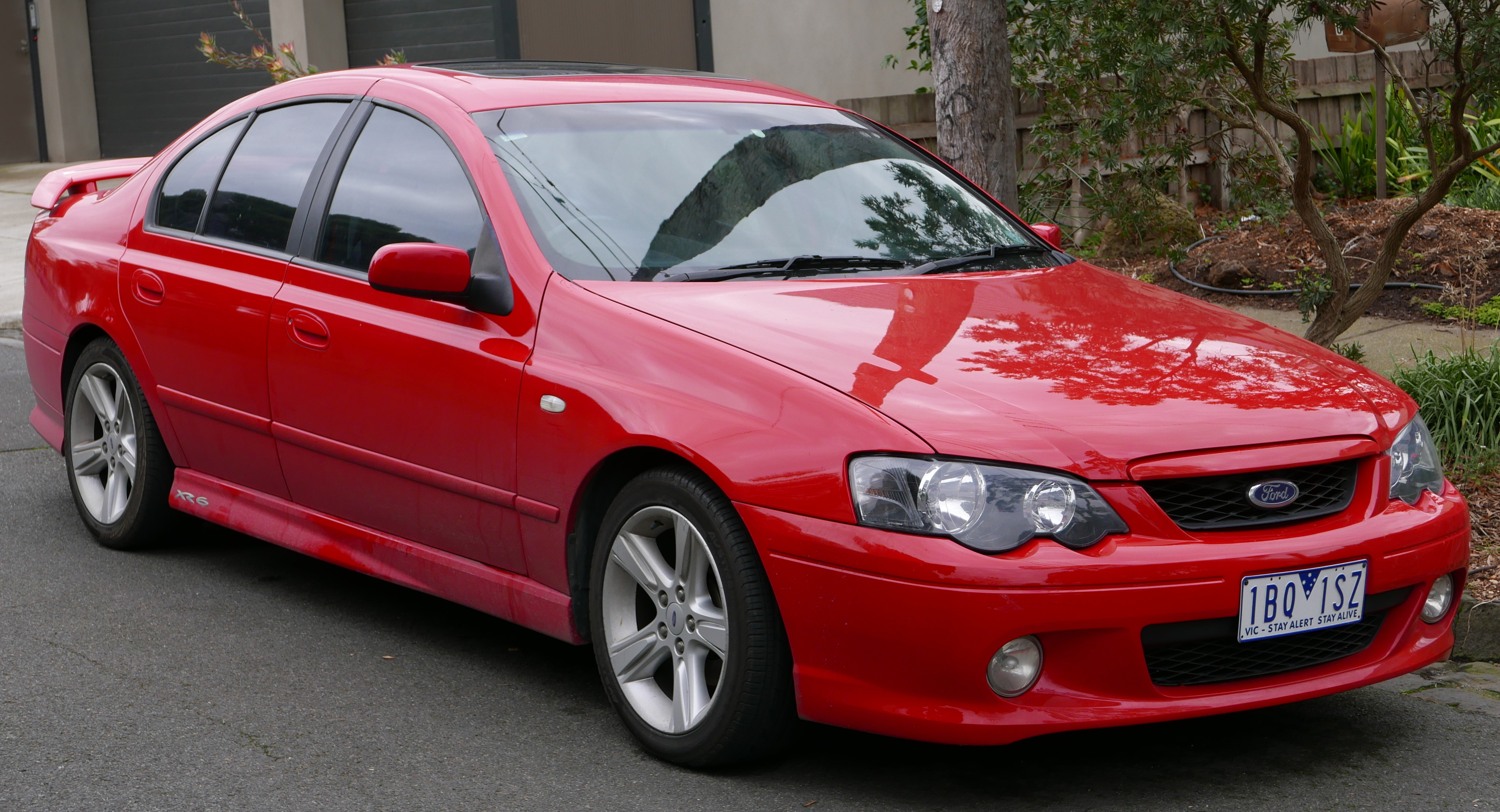
BA II Falcon XR6 sedan

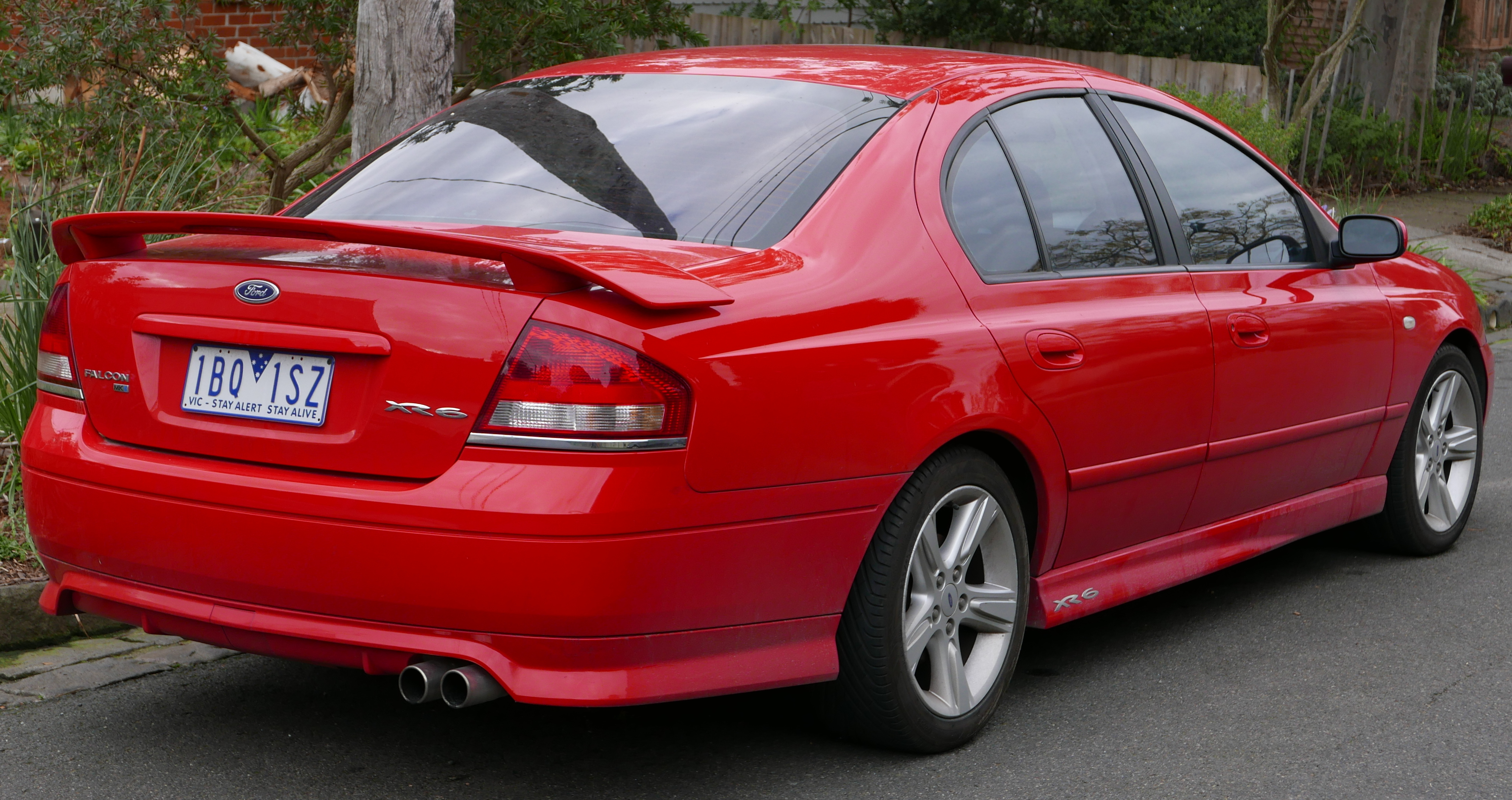
BA II Falcon XR6 sedan

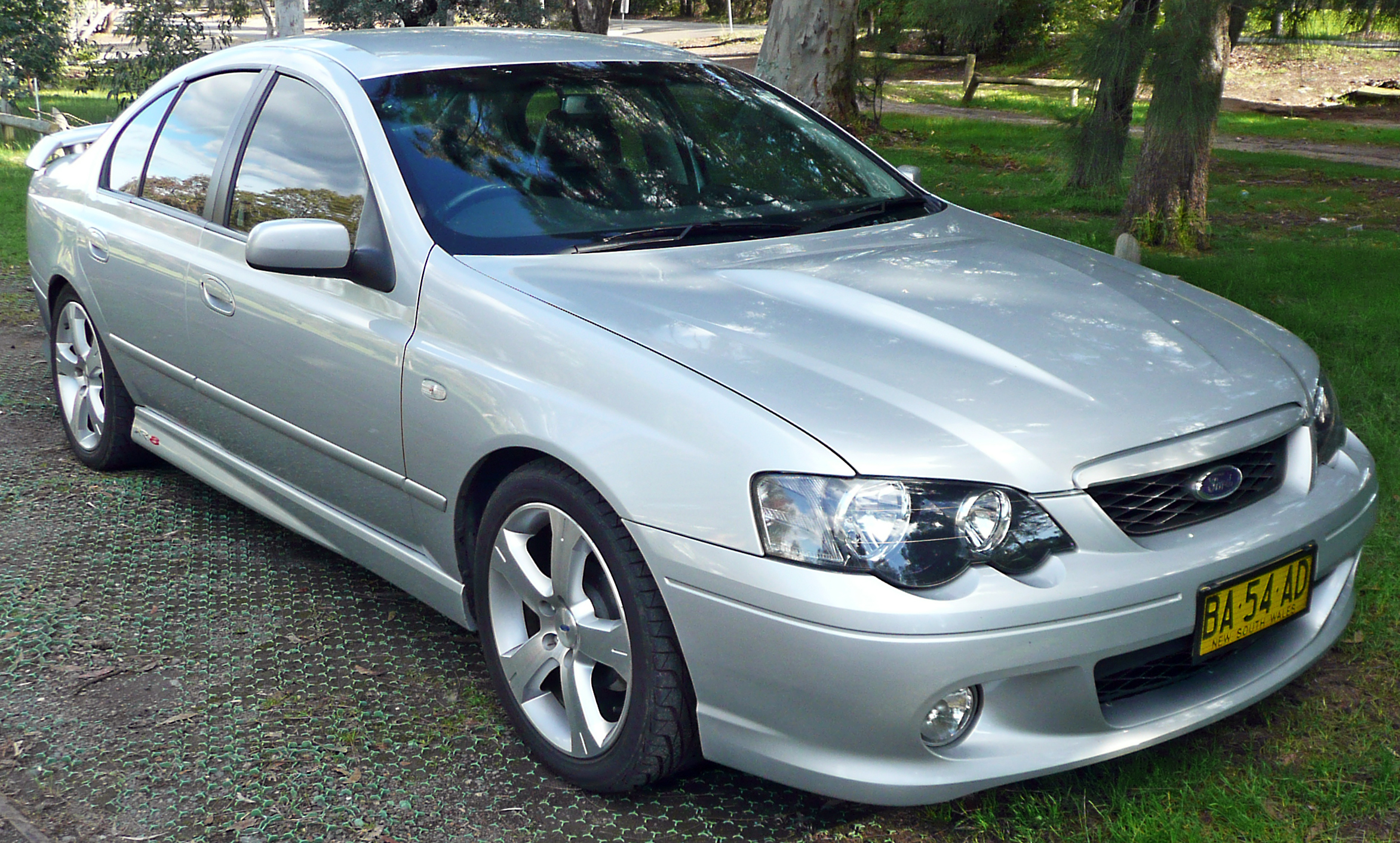
BA II Falcon XR8 sedan

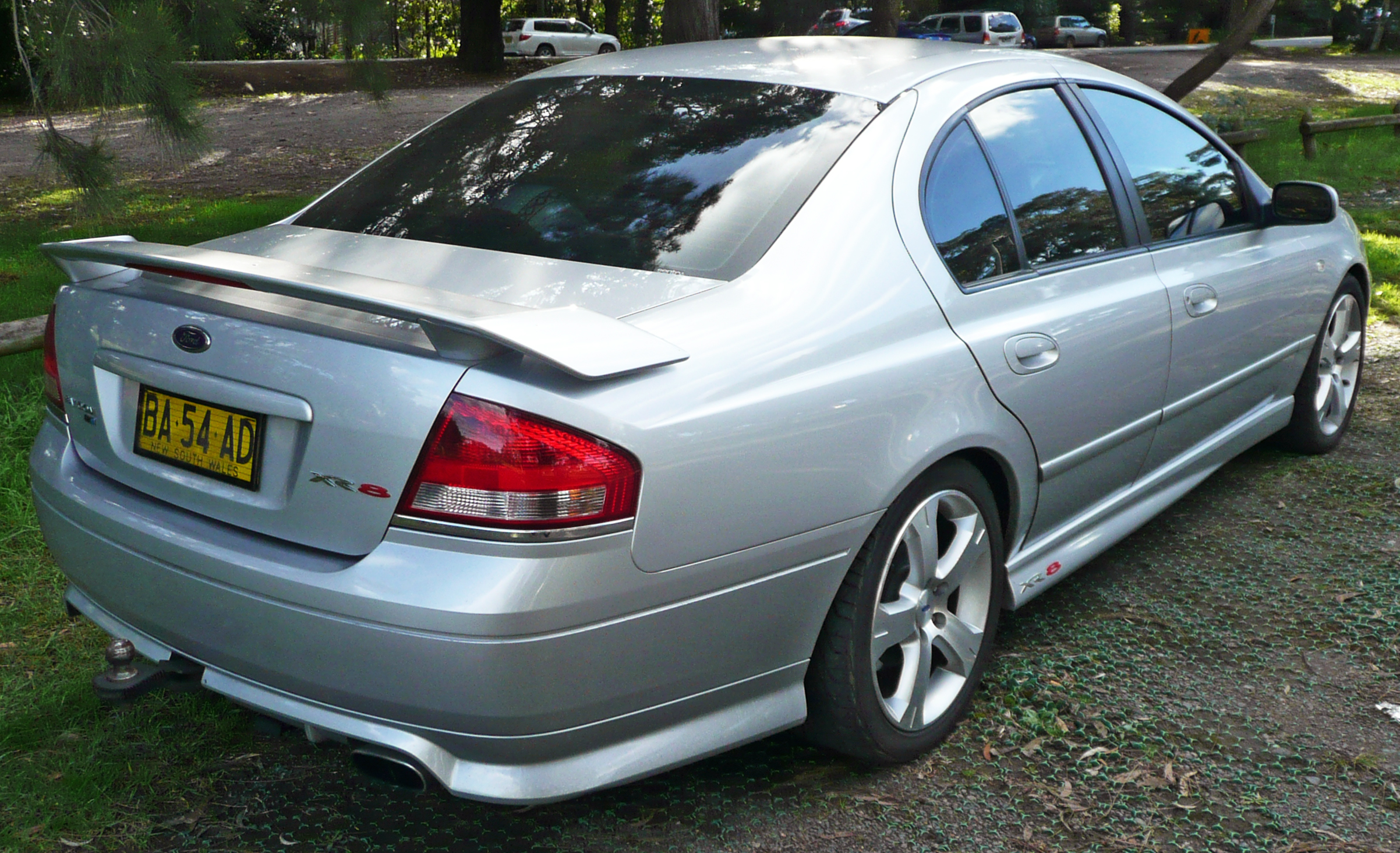
BA II Falcon XR8 sedan

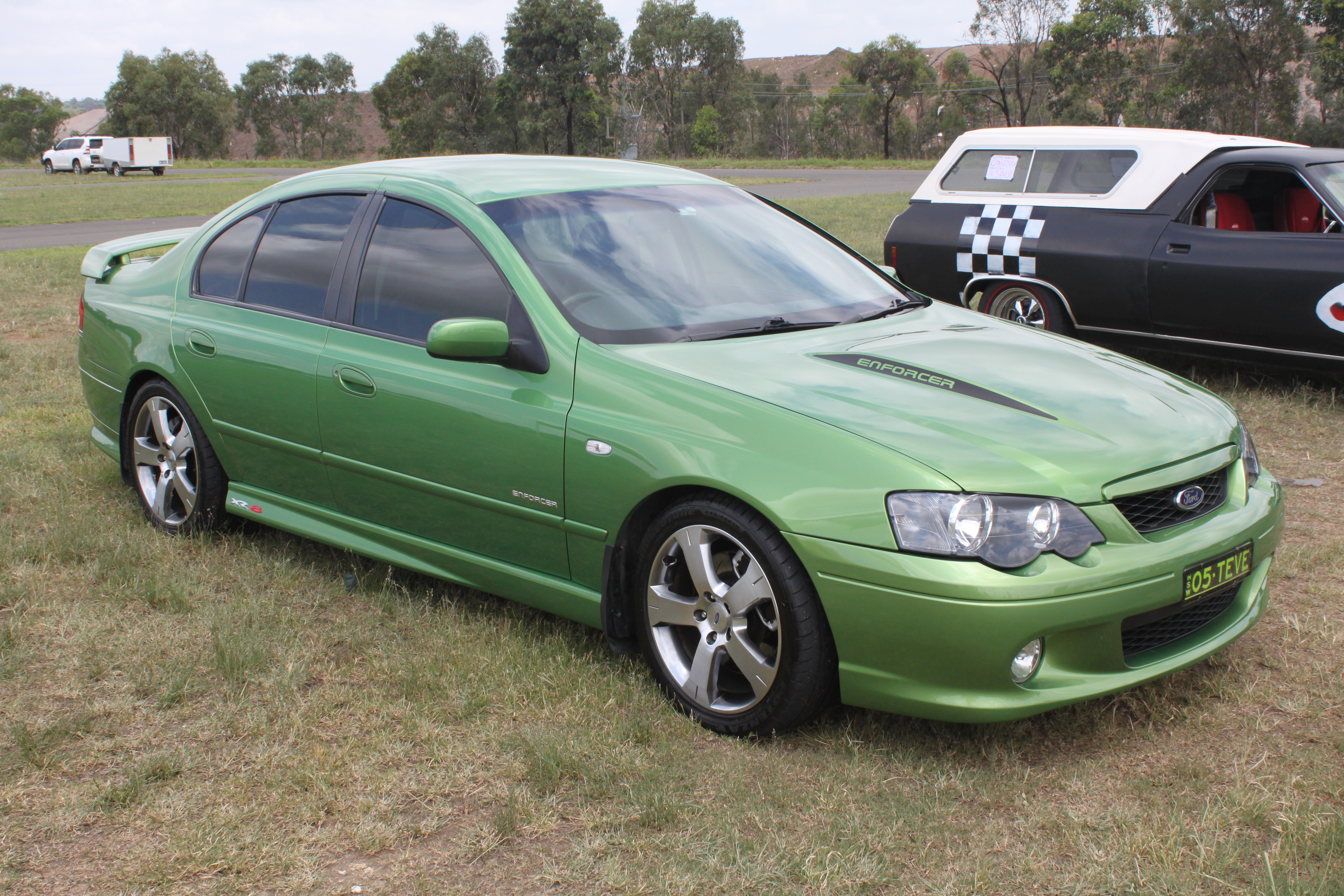
BA II Falcon XR8 Enforcer sedan

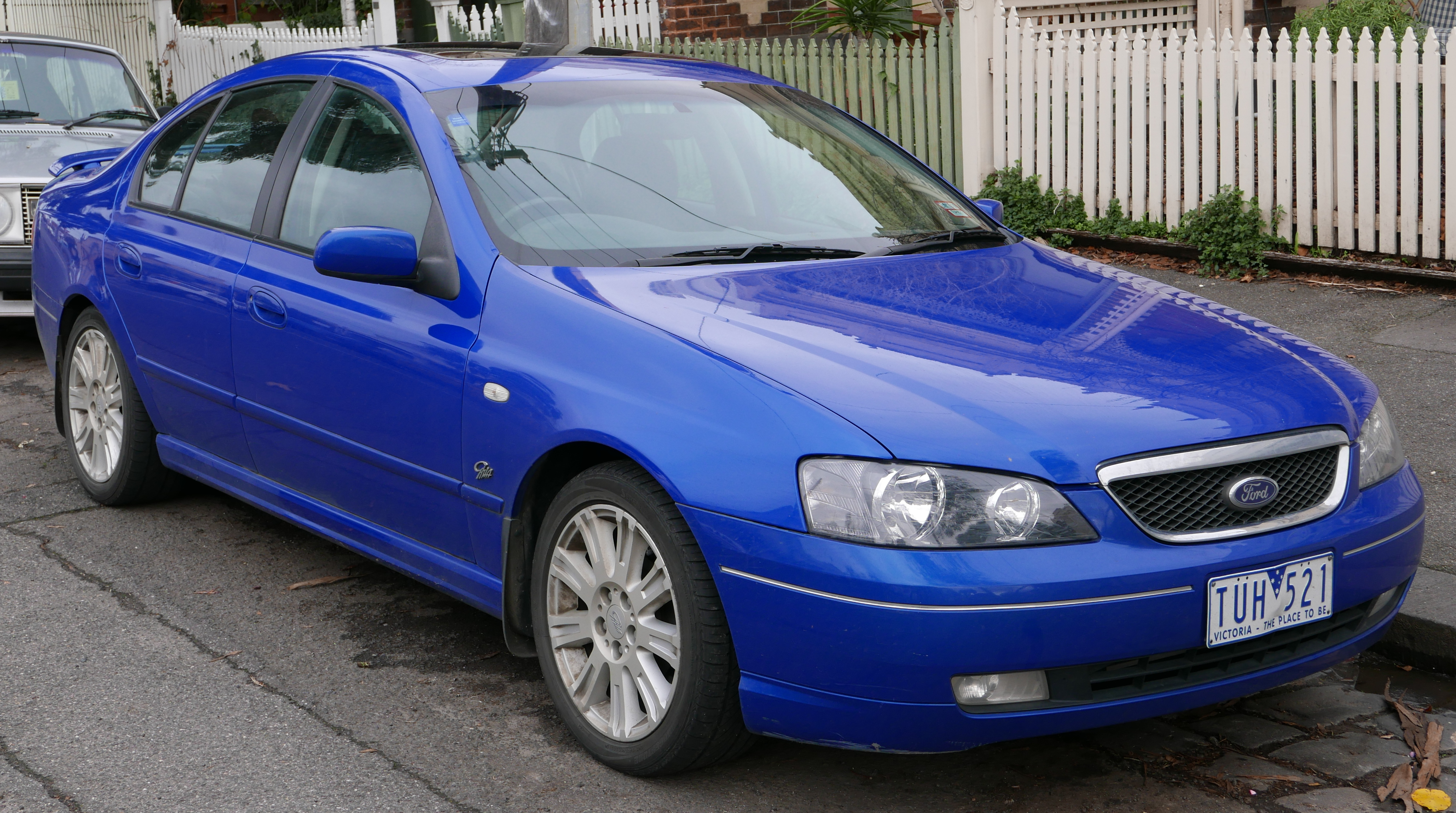
BA II Fairmont Ghia sedan

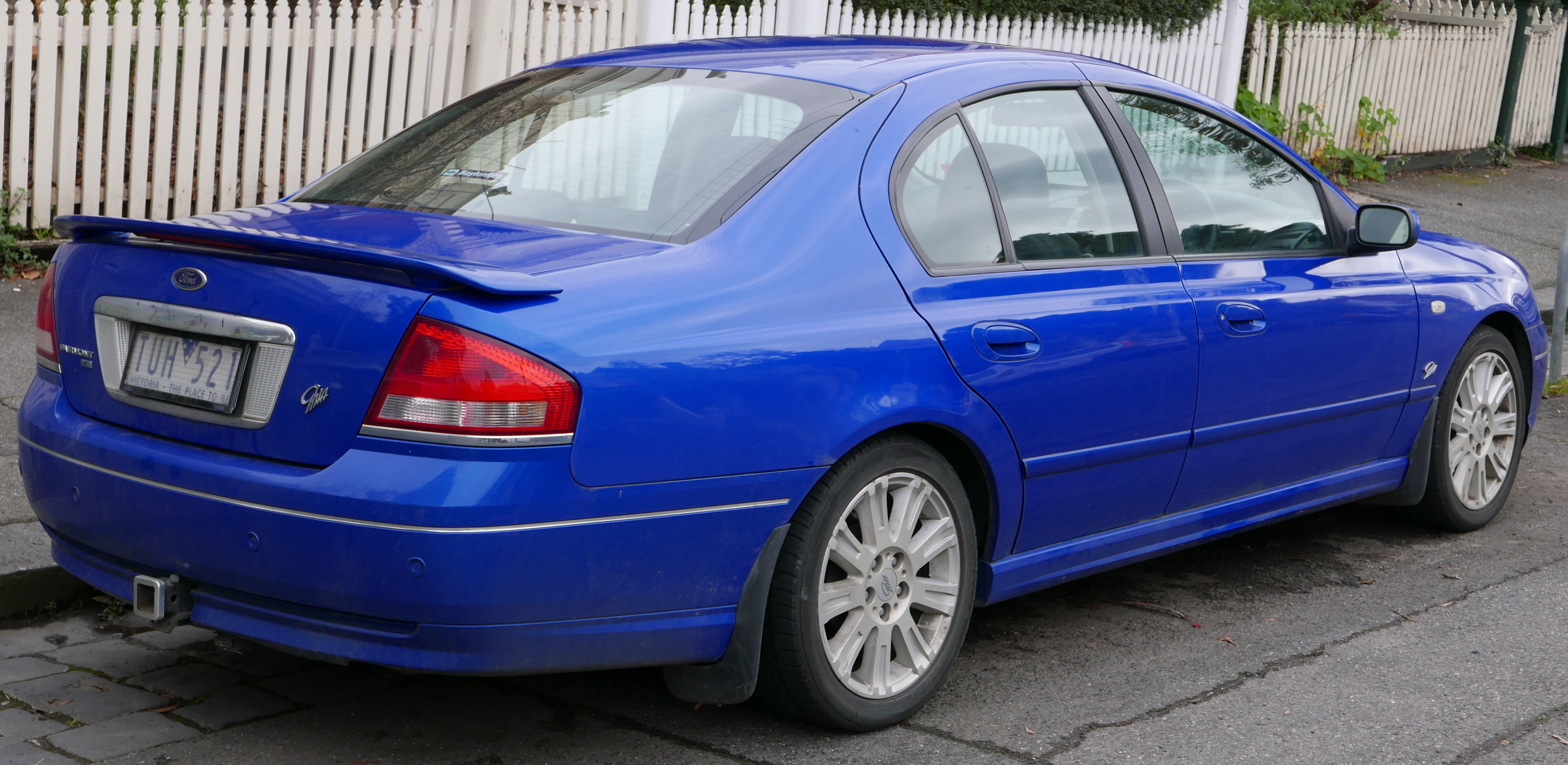
BA II Fairmont Ghia sedan

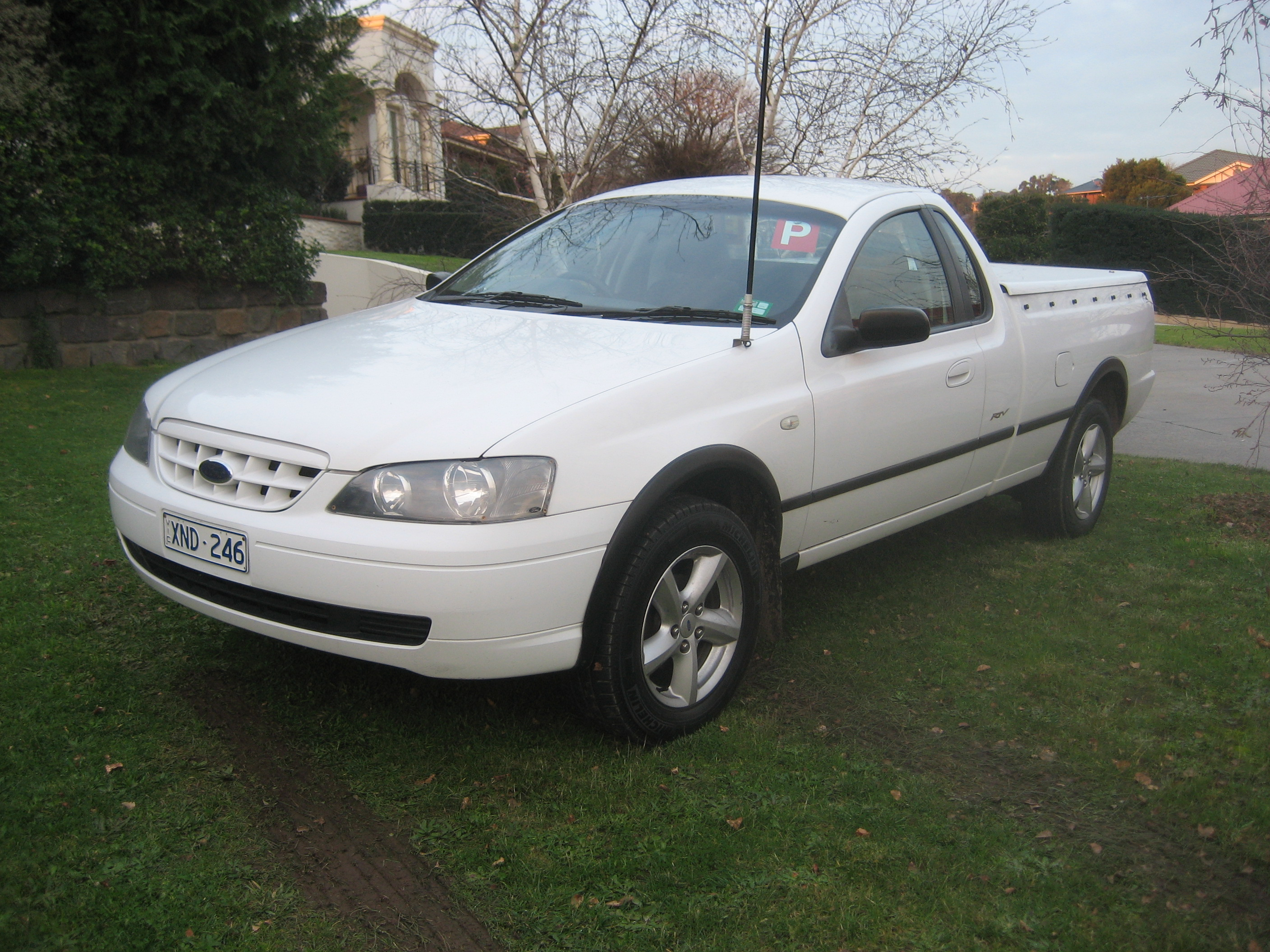
BA II Falcon RTV utility

== FPV range ==
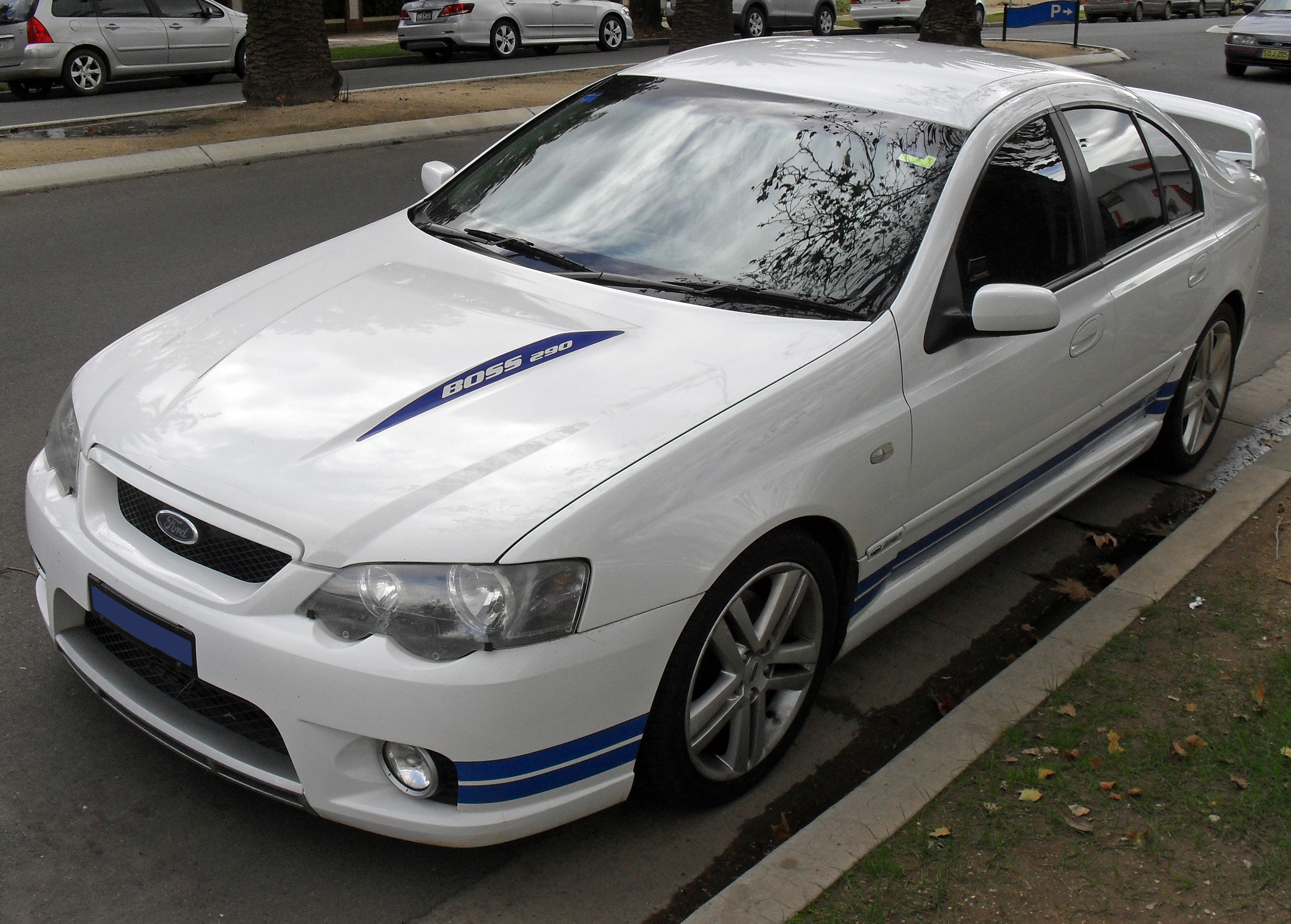
FPV BA GT Boss 290

Ford Australia's performance vehicle partner Ford Performance Vehicles produced a range of models based on the Falcon BA and marketed under the FPV name. The 2003 BA range included the GT, GT-P, and the Pursuit. The GT was the entry-level vehicle that started with a suggested retail price of A$59,810. The GT-P was the upmarket version of the GT, with a price tag of A$69,850. The Pursuit was a ute (utility) version of the GT, featuring the same seats, basic dash/interior package and wheels. FPV specific body-kits were applied to all cars, using the lights from the XR-range. The kit had a strong resemblance to the BA Falcon V8 Supercar, highlighting the connection to FPR.

All three were powered by the Boss 290, producing 290 kW (390 hp), it was a unique version of Ford's 5.4-litre Modular V8, with DOHC 4-valve cylinder heads from the 2000 Cobra R.

=== Mk II ===
The GT, GT-P and Pursuit received a new stripe package with bonnet decals, a six-speed Tremec T56 manual and the GT-P received 19-inch five-spoke alloy wheels. FPV also released the Super Pursuit, which was a Pursuit ute with GT-P extras.

New six cylinder sedan and utility models were added to the range, the F6 Typhoon and F6 Tornado, respectively. The F6 was visually separated from the GT range with the use of a different pattern in the front bumper grille mesh, and a smaller boot spoiler on the Typhoon. They were powered by FPV's Barra 270T engine, producing 270 kW (360 hp).

== Ford Falcon BA in V8 Supercars ==
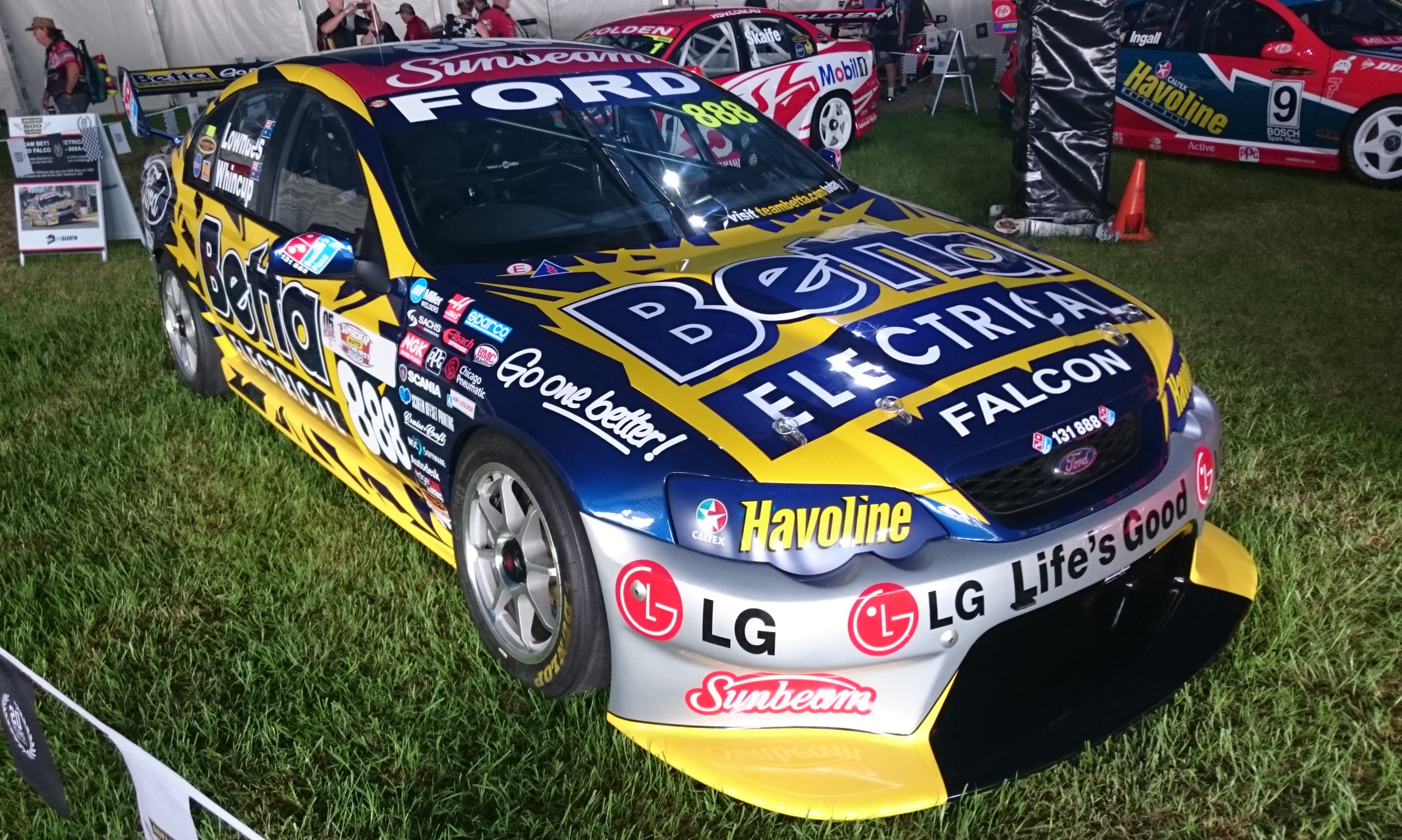
Craig Lowndes and Jamie Whincup won the 2006 Supercheap Auto Bathurst 1000 driving this Ford Falcon BA for Triple Eight Race Engineering. The image was taken in 2018.

The Falcon BA was raced in the Australian V8 Supercar category from 2003. Marcos Ambrose won the V8 Supercar Championship Series in 2003 and 2004 driving a BA. Craig Lowndes and Jamie Whincup won the 2006 Supercheap Auto Bathurst 1000 driving a Falcon BA.

== Enforcer and Devil R ==
After winning the V8 Supercar Championship Series in 2004 with racing drivers Marcos Ambrose and Russell Ingall Ford Australia released two limited run Ford Falcon BA XR8 dealer run-out vehicles denoted 'Enforcer', (only available in Envy Green) and 'Devil R' (named after Ambrose's nickname "The Devil Racer" (in reference to the Tasmanian Devil from his home state)) available in Shock-Wave blue only. These warmed-over XR8 base vehicles came with the same Boss 260 5.4-litre V8 engine as the base XR8 producing the same 260 kW (350 hp) output as the base XR8. Ford Australia has stated only 125 (56 manual 69 auto) of each model were produced. Both vehicle types were not sold with an individual build number as per the FPV range. These vehicles were equipped with a signed owners manual with Russell Ingall's signature, for the 'Enforcer'model or Marcos Ambrose's signature, for the 'Devil R' model, as well as respective signed engine bay plate. Both vehicles received 18" shadow chrome alloy wheels, carpets with the appropriate 'Enforcer' or 'Devil R' embroidery, leather seats with the model logo embroidery, Momo steering wheel, 'premium' brake package (non Brembo), either the 'Enforcer' or 'Devil R' badging to the exterior and the appropriate model name applied to the XR8 bonnet bulge side decals. These vehicles were priced below the FPV GT and GT-P hero cars in the non-FPV range, intended to be up-spec packaged versions of the base XR8 vehicles where Ford Australia intended to run out the remainder of optional-extras equipment during the last of the BA Mk II vehicles prior to the incoming redesigned BF model.

== Issues and criticism ==
Critics in the media noted some build quality faults in the BA Falcon, such as inconsistent gaps between trim sections and joints, although other commentators praised the interior design and craftsmanship. In the used car market, non-FPV BA Falcons tend to suffer from poor depreciation rates, due to influxes of ex-fleet models entering the second-hand market and because of the cost of fuel.
