= Holden SSX =

Concept car developed by Holden

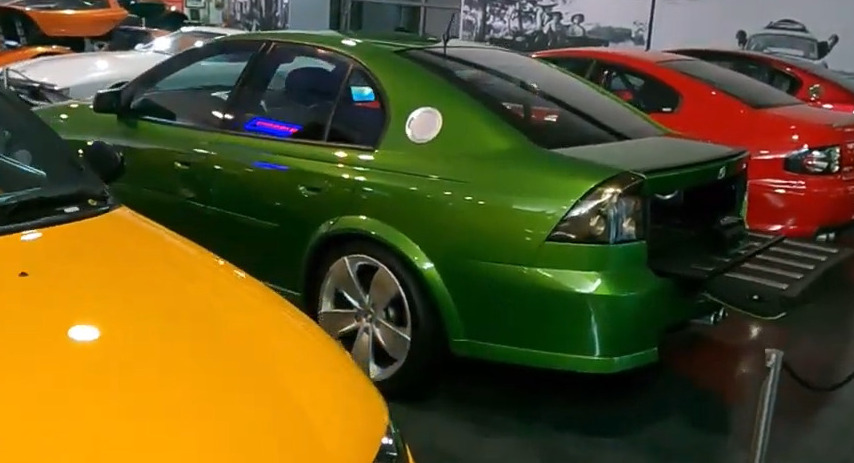

Overview
- Manufacturer: Holden (General Motors)
- Production: 2002
- Designer: Max Wolff

Body and chassis
- Class: Concept car
- Layout: Front engine, four-wheel drive
- Related: Holden Commodore (VY)

Powertrain
- Engine: Generation III, 'LS1' 5.7L V8

The Holden SSX is a concept sports–hatchback prototype car based on the Holden VY Commodore, with a V8 engine. The car features a "Kryptonite" green metallic paint job, with a black and silver interior, the rear is totally redesigned and features a new bumper and blackened taillights. The SSX concept formed part of the Holden display at the Sydney International Motor Show from October 18 to October 27, 2002. It currently resides at Australia's National Motor Museum in Birdwood, SA.

== Engine ==
The SSX is powered by a Generation III/Holden 5.7 L V8 engine generating 225 kW (302 hp) through all four wheels. This is done though Holden's "crossXtrac" all-wheel drive system, also featured on the Holden Crewman ute, Adventra wagon, HSV Avalanche and HSV Coupé 4.

== See also ==
- Rover SD1
- Holden Torana
