= Holden Commodore (VY) =

Australian full-size car

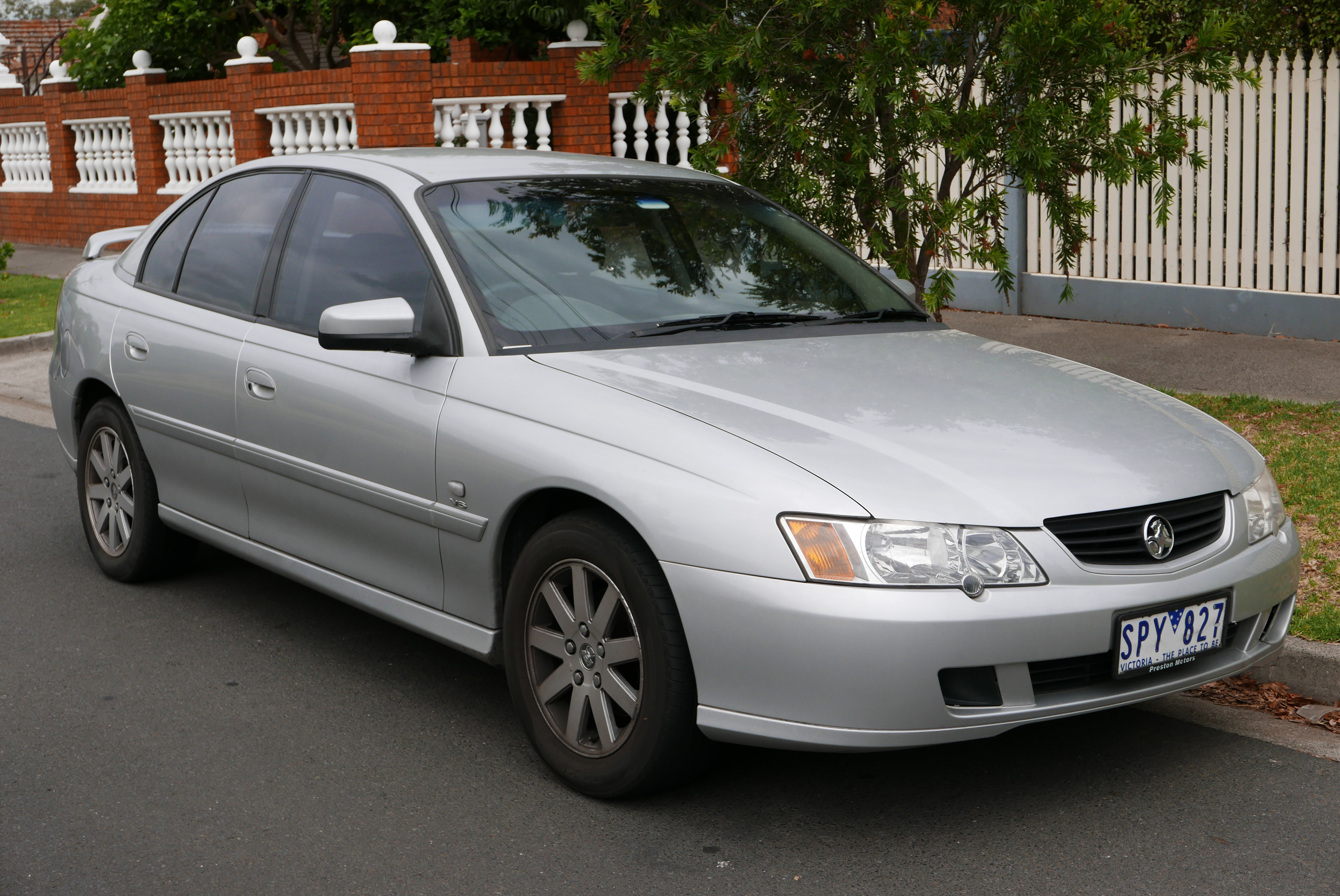
- 2003 Holden Commodore (VY II) 25th Anniversary sedan

Overview
- Manufacturer: Holden (General Motors)
- Also called: Holden Berlina; Holden Calais; Holden Ute; Chevrolet Lumina; Chevrolet Omega
- Production: September 2002 – August 2004
- Assembly: Australia: Adelaide, South Australia (Elizabeth)
- Designer: Mike Simcoe

Body and chassis
- Class: Full-size
- Body style: 4-door sedan 5-door station wagon 4-door utility 2 door coupé utility
- Layout: FR layout
- Platform: GM V platform
- Related: Opel Omega B Holden Adventra (VY II); Holden Crewman (VY); Holden One Tonner (VY); Holden Monaro (V2 II and III); Holden Statesman/Caprice (WK); HSV Y Series; Holden SSX

Powertrain
- Engine: V6: 3.8 L 152 kW (204 hp): ECOTEC; 3.8 L 171 kW: (229 hp) Supercharged ECOTEC; V8: 5.7 L 225 kW (302 hp): Gen III LS1; 5.7 L 235 kW (315 hp): Gen III LS1; 5.7 L 245 kW (329 hp): Gen III LS1
- Transmission: 5-speed Getrag 260 manual 6-speed manual TREMEC T56; 4-speed automatic GM 4L60-E

Dimensions
- Wheelbase: 2,788 mm (109.8 in) (sedan); 2,938 mm (115.7 in) (wagon, utility)
- Length: 4,891–5,046 mm (192.6–198.7 in)
- Width: 1,842–1,847 mm (72.5–72.7 in)
- Height: 1,450–1,545 mm (57.1–60.8 in)
- Kerb weight: 1,522–1,590 kg (3,355–3,505 lb)

Chronology
- Predecessor: Holden Commodore (VX)
- Successor: Holden Commodore (VZ)

The Holden Commodore (VY) is a full-size car that was produced by Holden from 2002 to 2004. It was the third iteration of the third generation of the Commodore. Its range included the luxury variants, Holden Berlina (VY) and Holden Calais (VY); commercial versions were called the Holden One Tonner (VY), Holden Ute (VY), and Holden Crewman (VY). In 2003, the range also saw the introduction of the first Commodore-based all-wheel drive variants, including the Holden Adventra (VY) wagon.

== Overview ==
Released in September 2002 and produced until August 2004 (with a Series II released in August 2003), the VY series was the first major design departure (both inside and out) of the third generation Commodore range released in August 1997. It launched at the same time as the Ford BA Falcon.

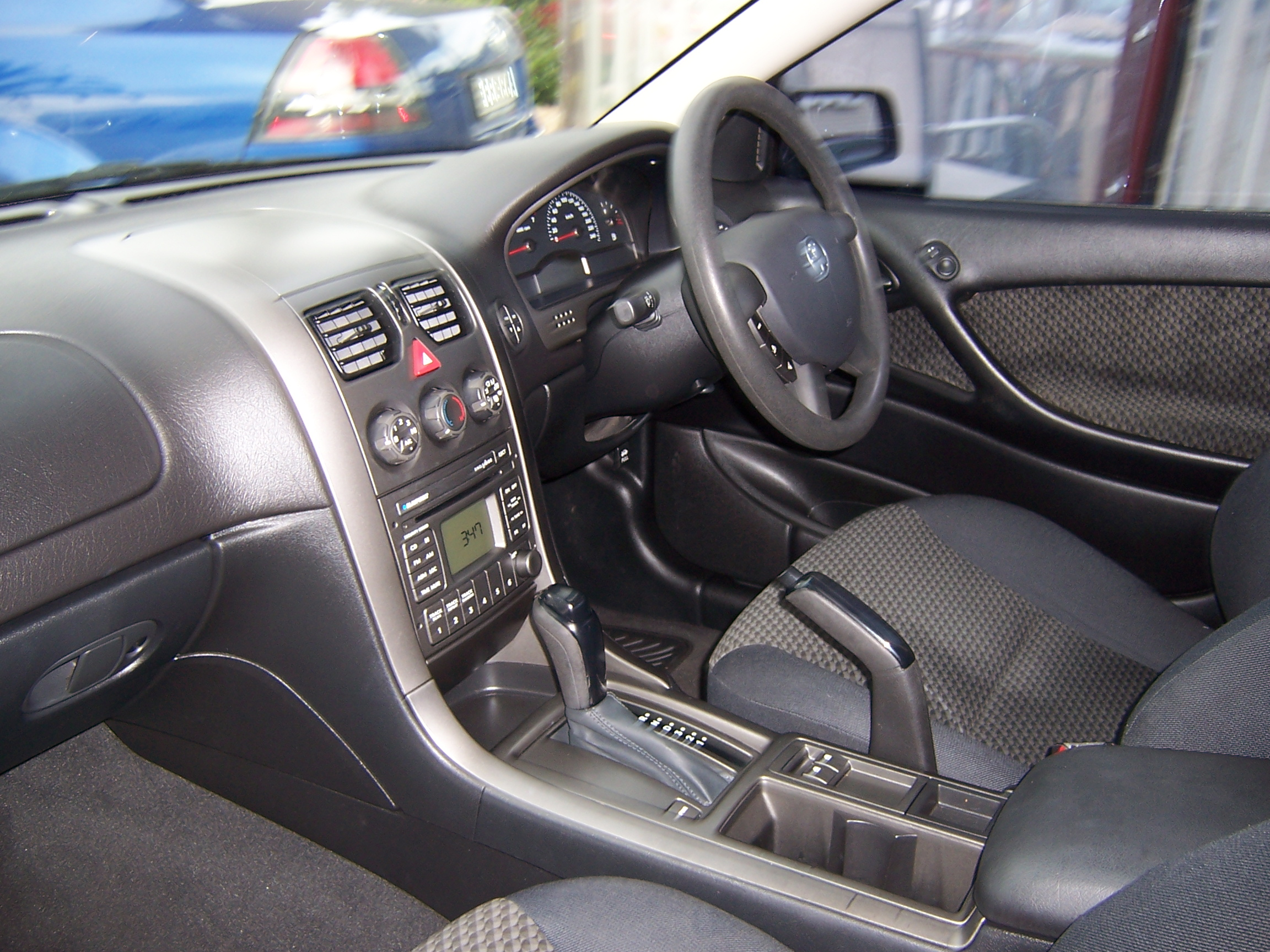
Interior

The range included the following models:

- Commodore Executive
- Commodore Acclaim
- Commodore SV8
- Commodore SS
- Commodore S
- Berlina
- Calais

These models were all offered as sedans, and wagons only with the Executive, Acclaim and Berlina. Unusually, the VY also introduced a limited edition SS wagon featuring the same 235 kW (315 hp) V8 (upgraded to 245 kW or 329 hp for Series II), body kit and sports suspension as the SS sedan. However, it was equipped with 17-inch alloy wheels as opposed to the 18-inch wheels on the sedan.

The VY was the last Commodore to use the 3.8-litre Ecotec V6 engines originally introduced in the VN Commodore, 16 years prior.

Following General Motors and Subaru tie-up in 1999, Holden considered giving the VY Ute for Subaru to sell, in exchange of the Forester SUV being sold in Holden dealerships with Holden badges, as the brand lacked an SUV offering. Subaru considered naming the rebadged Ute the Subaru Brumby. According to former Subaru Australia managing director Nick Senior, the plan was called off due to objection from Subaru Australia.

== Development ==
=== Design ===
The front and rear of the body had minor restyling, with a new front grille, headlights and taillights. The interior has been significantly upgraded. Interior upgrade includes a new instrument panel, centre console and steering wheel and new design transmission lever and handbrake. There is also a new mobile phone power outlet under the centre console. The new instrument cluster features a large multi-function digital display (single or triple window, depending on model), which displays information such as radio station display, PRND321 gear selected indicator, trip computer with stopwatch function, service reminders and a help facility.

Standard features (on some models) now include "twilight sentinel" - automatic headlamp control, programmable headlamps off time delay, high feature Blaupunkt audio systems, road-speed sensitive intermittent wipers and passenger airbags.

The VY Series II update added cruise control, front power windows variable front seat lumbar support, and revised interior trims. A 245 kW (329 hp) V8 was introduced to sports variants and a sportier repositioning of the Calais model. This repositioning included a subtle body kit, the option of a 235 kW V8 in place of the previous 225 kW (302 hp) and a firmer suspension tune (known as FE 1.5) that was not as stiff as the FE2 suspension on sports variants.

=== Powertrains ===
| Engine displacement; configuration | Engine | Power | Torque | Transmission | Fuel type | Fuel consumption (sedan) |
|---|---|---|---|---|---|---|
| 3.8 L (3791 cc); V6 | ECOTEC (L36) | 152 kW (204 hp) | 305 N⋅m (225 lb⋅ft) | 5-speed Getrag 260 (M35) manual | Petrol | 11.0 L/100 km (21.4 mpg_{‑US}) |
| 3.8 L (3791 cc); V6 | ECOTEC (L36) | 152 kW (204 hp) | 305 N⋅m (225 lb⋅ft) | 4-speed GM 4L60-E (M30) automatic | Petrol | 12.0 L/100 km (19.6 mpg_{‑US}) |
| 3.8 L (3791 cc); V6 | Supercharged ECOTEC (L67) | 171 kW (229 hp) | 375 N⋅m (277 lb⋅ft) | 4-speed GM 4L60-E (M30) automatic | PULP | 13.5 L/100 km (17.4 mpg_{‑US}) |
| 5.7 L (5665 cc); V8 | Generation III Alloy (LS1) | 225 kW (302 hp) | 460 N⋅m (339 lb⋅ft) | 6-speed Tremec T-56 manual | Petrol | 13.0 L/100 km (18.1 mpg_{‑US}) |
| 5.7 L (5665 cc); V8 | Generation III Alloy (LS1) | 225 kW (302 hp) | 460 N⋅m (339 lb⋅ft) | 4-speed GM 4L60-E automatic | Petrol | 13.5 L/100 km (17.4 mpg_{‑US}) |
| 5.7 L (5665 cc); V8 | Generation III Alloy (LS1) | 235 kW (315 hp) | 465 N⋅m (343 lb⋅ft) | 6-speed Tremec T-56 manual | Petrol | 13.0 L/100 km (18.1 mpg_{‑US}) |
| 5.7 L (5665 cc); V8 | Generation III Alloy (LS1) | 235 kW (315 hp) | 465 N⋅m (343 lb⋅ft) | 4-speed GM 4L60-E automatic | Petrol | 13.5 L/100 km (17.4 mpg_{‑US}) |
| 5.7 L (5667 cc); V8 | Generation III Alloy (LS1) | 245 kW (329 hp) | 465 N⋅m (343 lb⋅ft) | 6-speed Tremec T-56 manual | Petrol | 13.0 L/100 km (18.1 mpg_{‑US}) |
| 5.7 L (5667 cc); V8 | Generation III Alloy (LS1) | 245 kW (329 hp) | 465 N⋅m (343 lb⋅ft) | 4-speed GM 4L60-E automatic | Petrol | 13.5 L/100 km (17.4 mpg_{‑US}) |

== Models ==
=== Commodore Executive ===
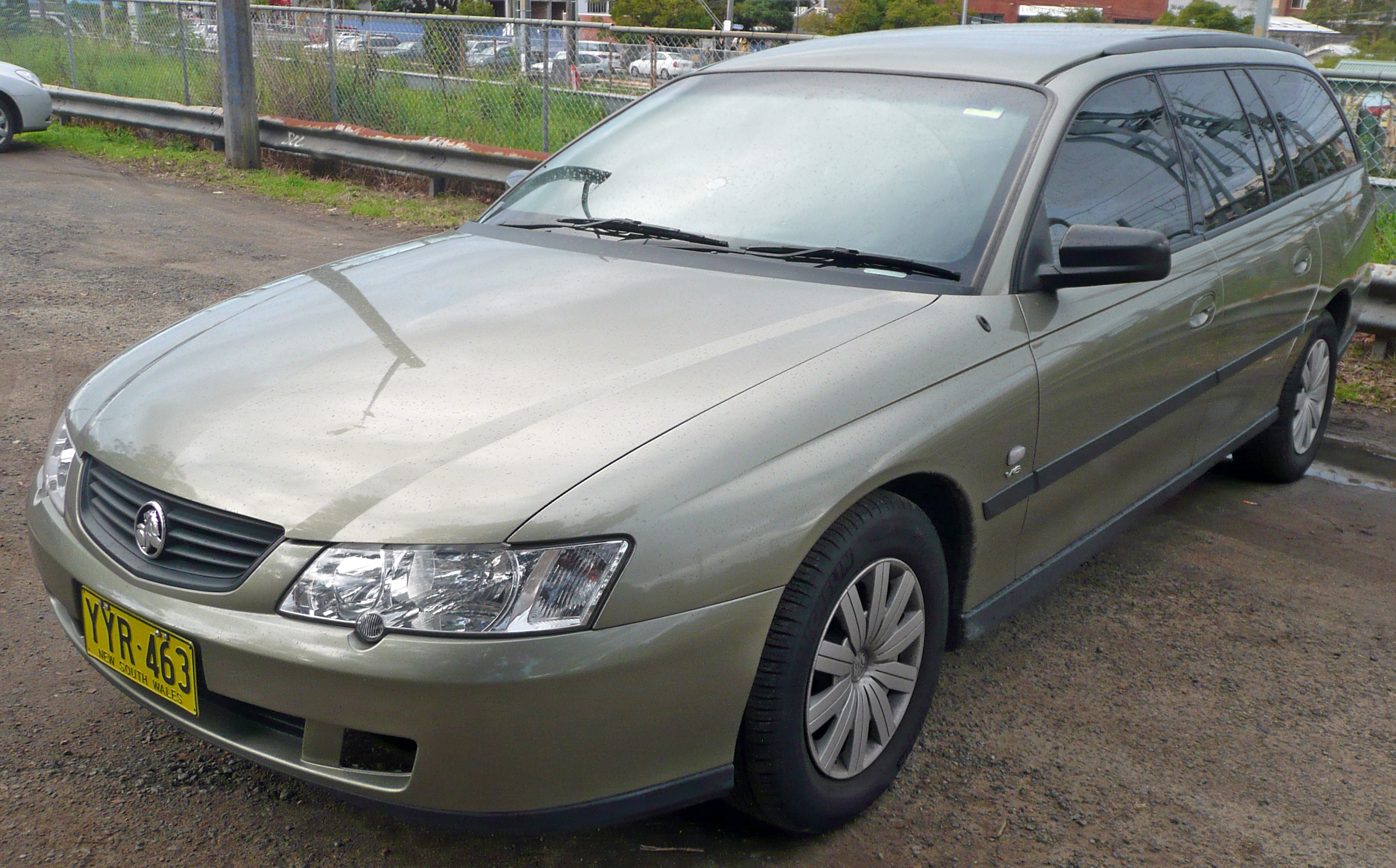
Holden Commodore (VY) Executive station wagon

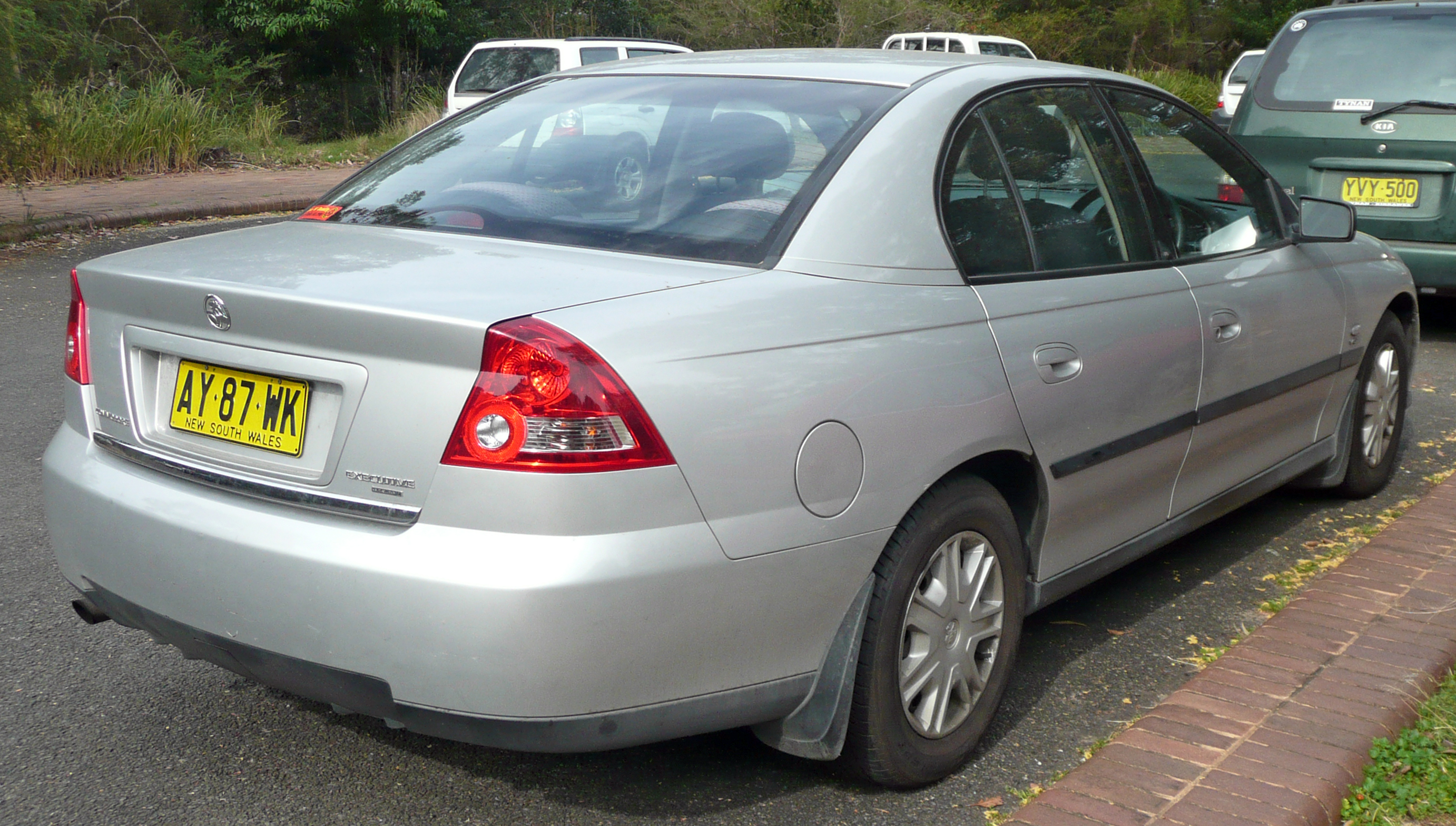
Holden Commodore (VY II) Executive sedan

The Executive is the baseline model of the VY Commodore range.

The Executive features included:

- 3.8 L 152 kW (204 hp) ECOTEC V6
- 5-speed manual transmission (option of 4-speed automatic transmission)
- Anti-lock braking system (ABS)
- Brake assist (BA)
- CD player
- Driver's and passenger's airbags
- Independent rear suspension (IRS)
- Power antenna
- Security system
- Trip computer
- 15-inch steel wheels
- Cruise control
- Air conditioning

=== Commodore Acclaim ===
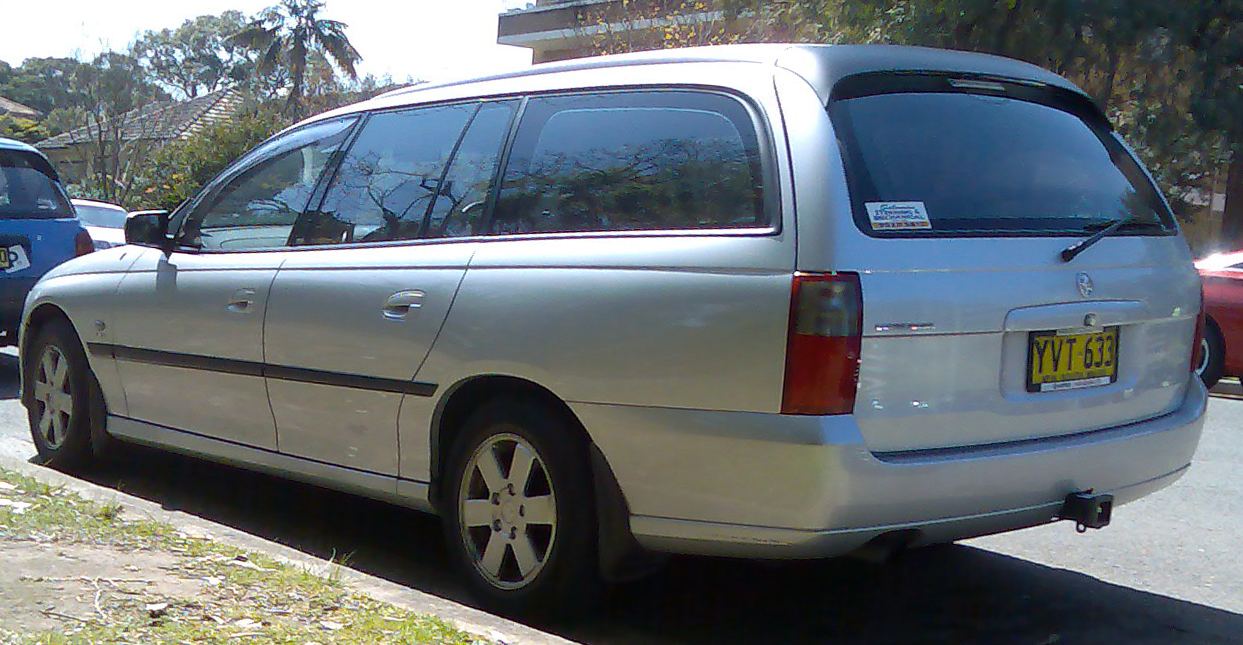
Holden Commodore (VY) Acclaim wagon

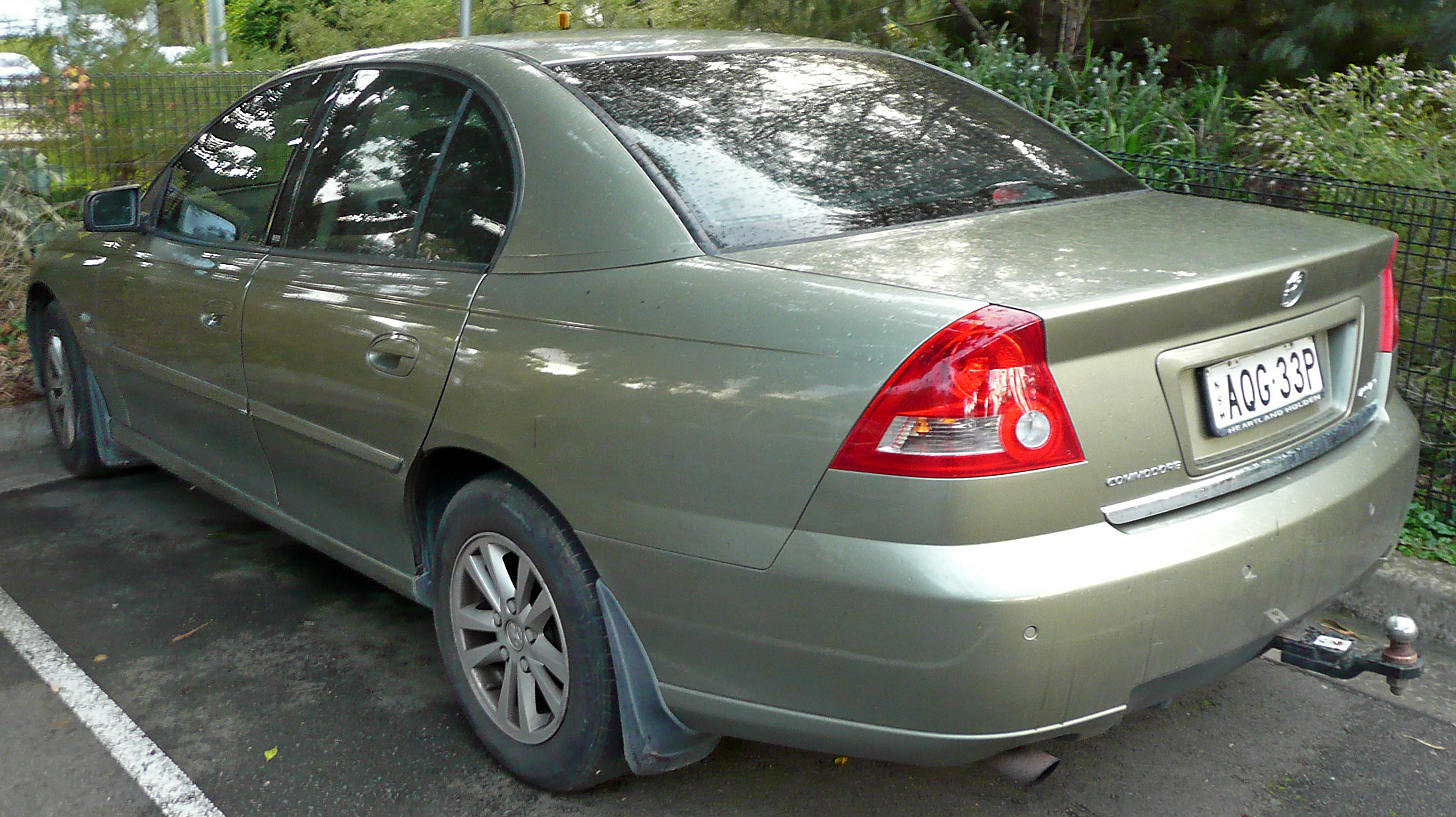
Holden Commodore (VY II) Acclaim sedan

The Acclaim is one model up from the base model of the VY Commodore range.

The Acclaim features included:

- 3.8 L 152 kW (204 hp) ECOTEC V6
- 4-speed automatic transmission
- Air conditioning
- Anti-lock braking system (ABS)
- Brake assist (BA)
- CD player
- Cruise control
- Driver's and passenger's airbags
- Front and rear power windows
- Independent rear suspension (IRS)
- Power antenna
- Security system
- Side impact airbags (SIAB)
- Traction control system (TCS)
- Trip computer
- 15-inch alloy wheels

=== Commodore S ===
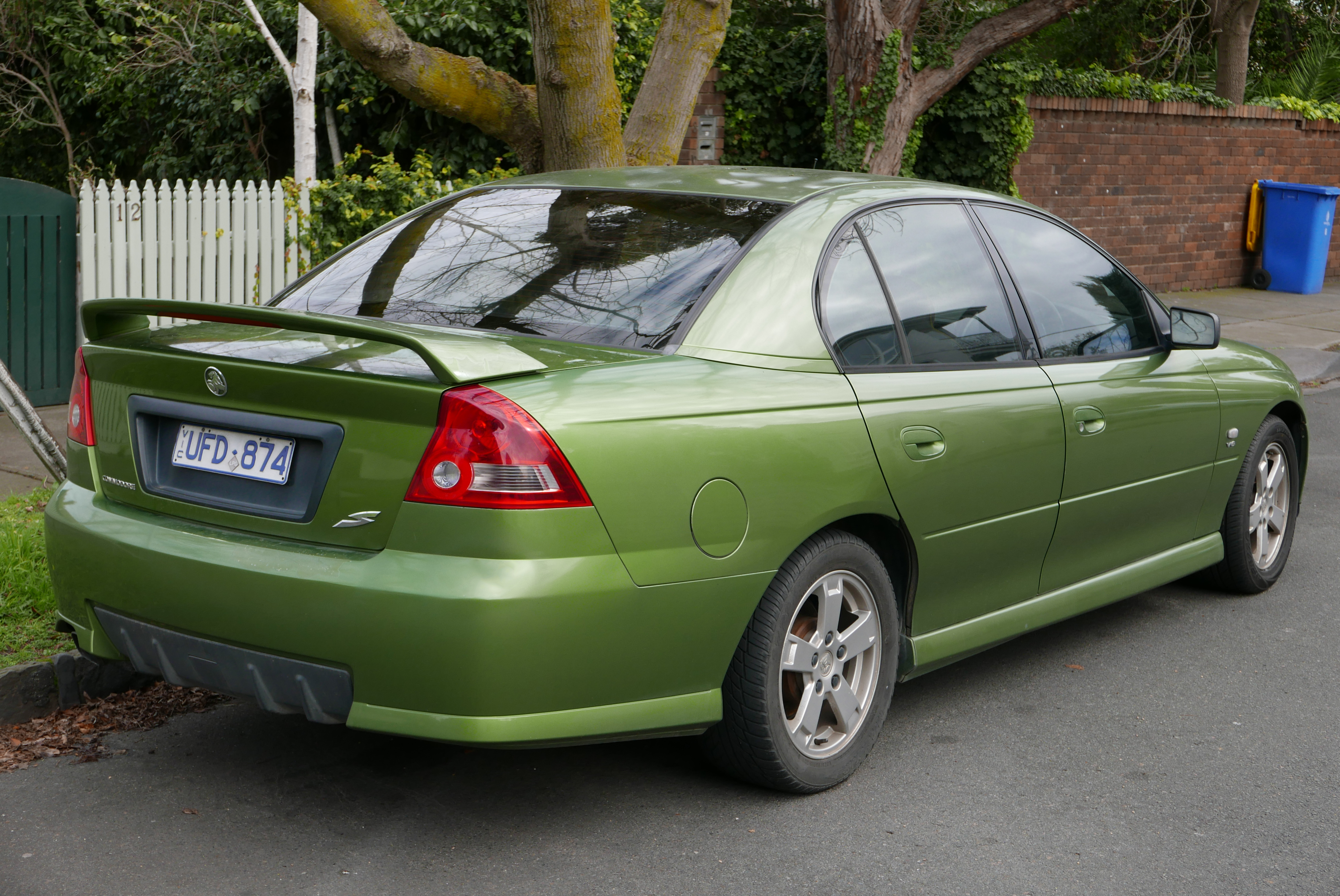
Holden Commodore (VY) S sedan

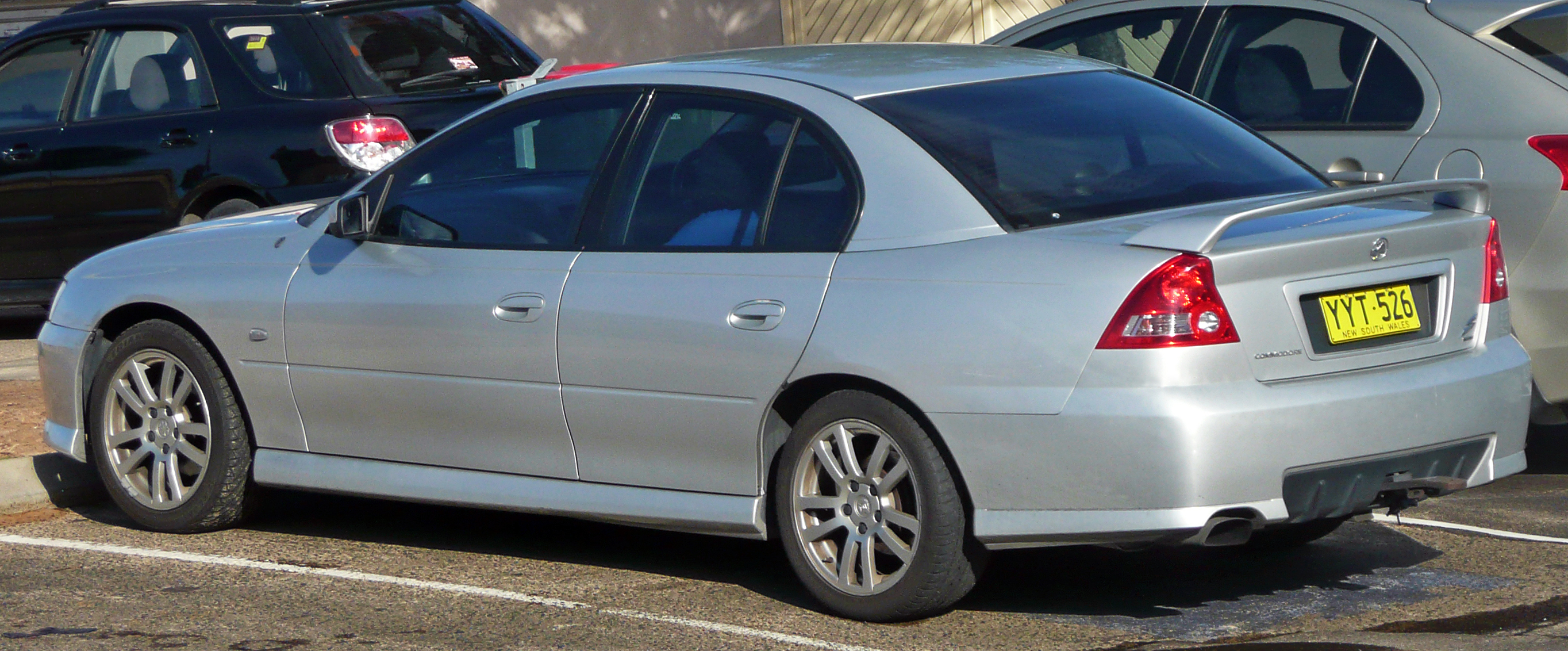
Holden Commodore (VY II) S sedan

The S is the cheapest sports variant.

The S features included:

- 3.8 L 152 kW (204 hp) ECOTEC V6 (option of 171 kW (229 hp) Supercharged V6)
- 5-speed manual transmission (option of 4-speed automatic transmission)
- Air conditioning
- Anti-lock braking system (ABS)
- Brake assist (BA)
- CD player
- Cruise control
- Driver's and passenger's airbags
- FE2 sports suspension
- Front and rear power windows
- Independent rear suspension (IRS)
- Power antenna
- Security system
- Traction control system (TCS)
- Trip computer
- 16-inch alloy wheels (17-inch alloy wheels on the Series II)

=== Commodore SV8 ===
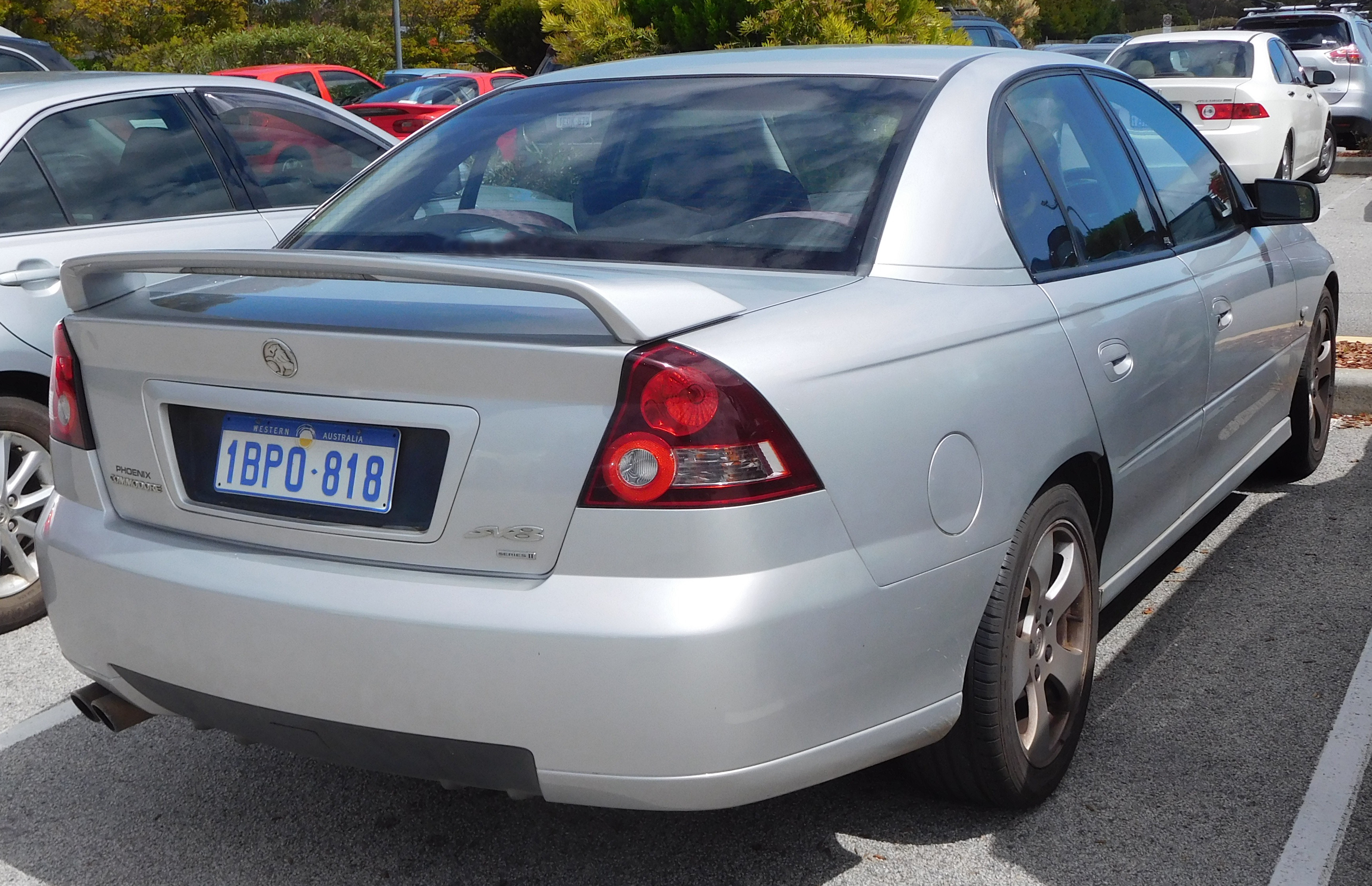
Holden Commodore (VY II) SV8 sedan

The VY Commodore was the first to not offer a V8 option on the Executive model. Buyers now had to choose the new SV8 as the cheapest V8 variant. The SV8 was essentially an Executive with a V8 engine, rear spoiler and unique 17 inch alloy wheels. The SV8 features included:

- 5.7 L 235 kW (315 hp) V8 (245 kW (329 hp) High Output V8 in Series II)
- 6-speed manual transmission (option of 4-speed automatic transmission)
- Air conditioning
- Anti-lock braking system (ABS)
- Brake assist (BA)
- CD player
- Driver's and passenger's airbags
- FE2 sports suspension
- Limited slip differential (LSD)
- Independent rear suspension (IRS)
- Power antenna
- Security system
- Traction control system (TCS)
- Trip computer
- 17-inch alloy wheels

=== Commodore SS ===
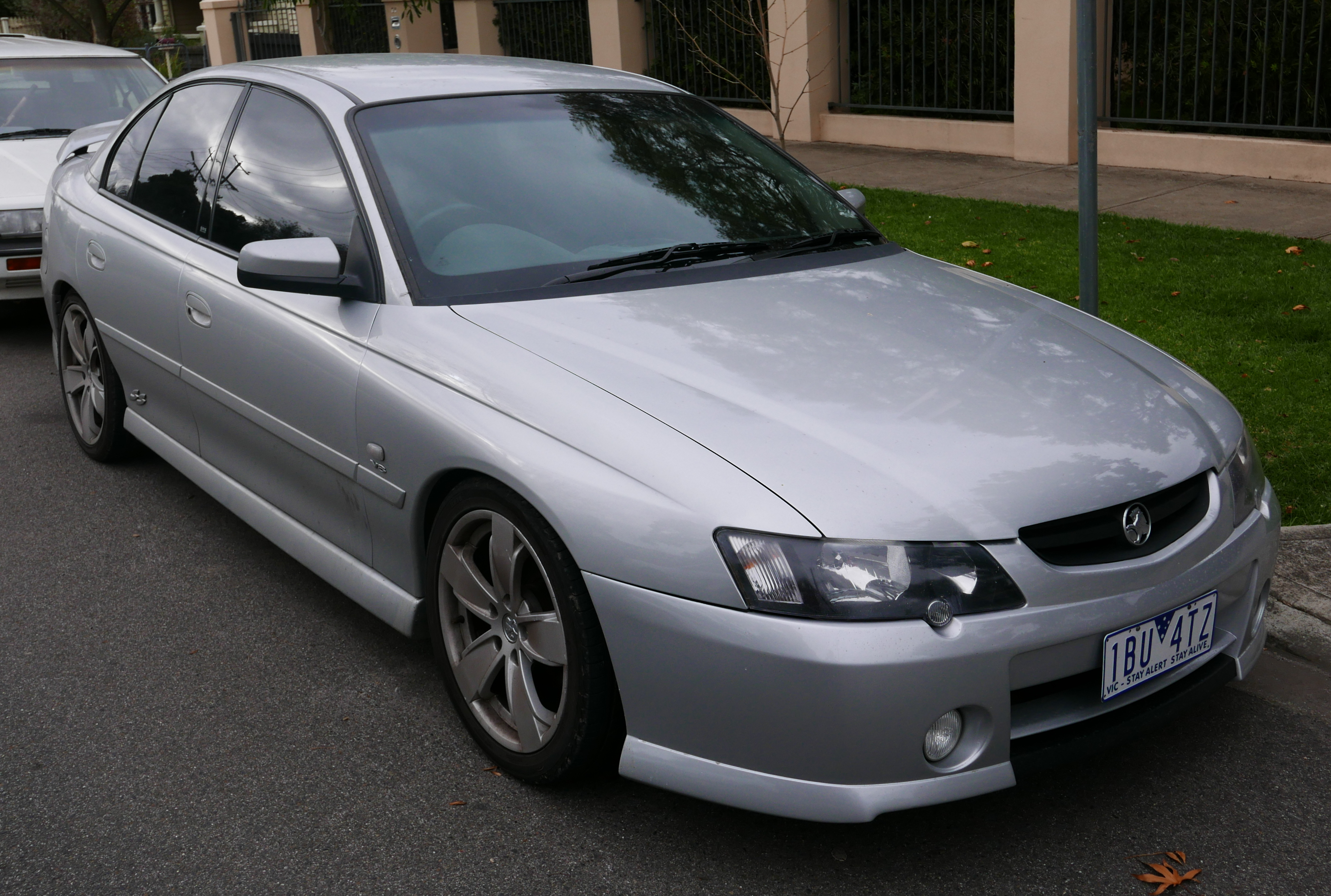
Holden Commodore (VY) SS sedan

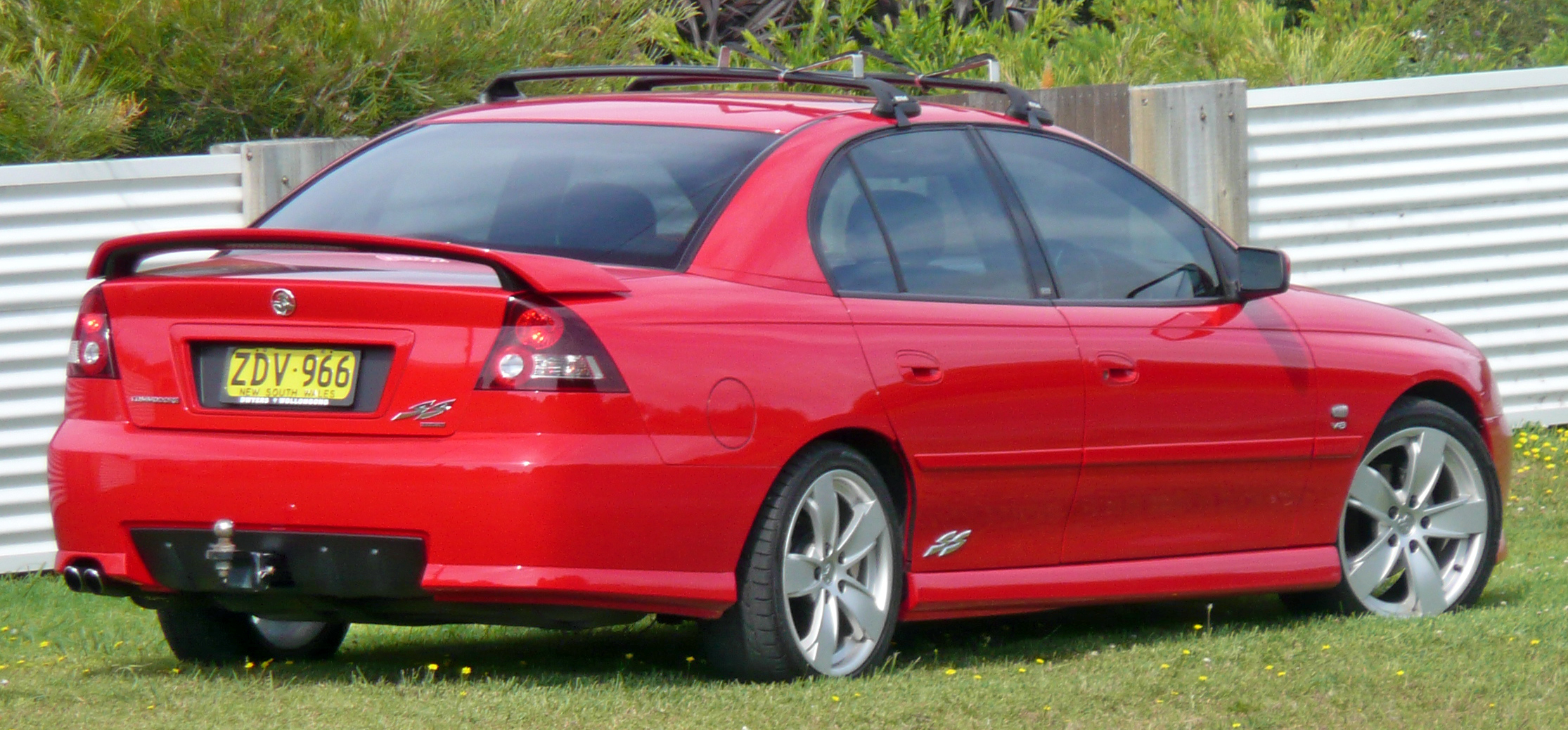
Holden Commodore (VY II) SS sedan

The SS was the flagship sports model of the VY range.

The SS features included:

- 5.7 L 235 kW (315 hp) V8 (245 kW (329 hp) High Output V8 in Series II)
- 6-speed manual transmission (option of 4-speed automatic transmission)
- Single in-dash CD player (option of 6 disc in-dash cd player)
- Air conditioning
- Anti-lock braking system (ABS)
- Brake assist (BA)
- Cruise control
- Driver's and passenger's airbags
- FE2 sports suspension
- Front and rear power windows
- Independent rear suspension (IRS)
- Limited slip differential (LSD)
- Power antenna
- Security system
- Side impact airbags (SIAB)
- Traction control system (TCS)
- Trip computer
- 18-inch alloy wheels

=== Berlina ===
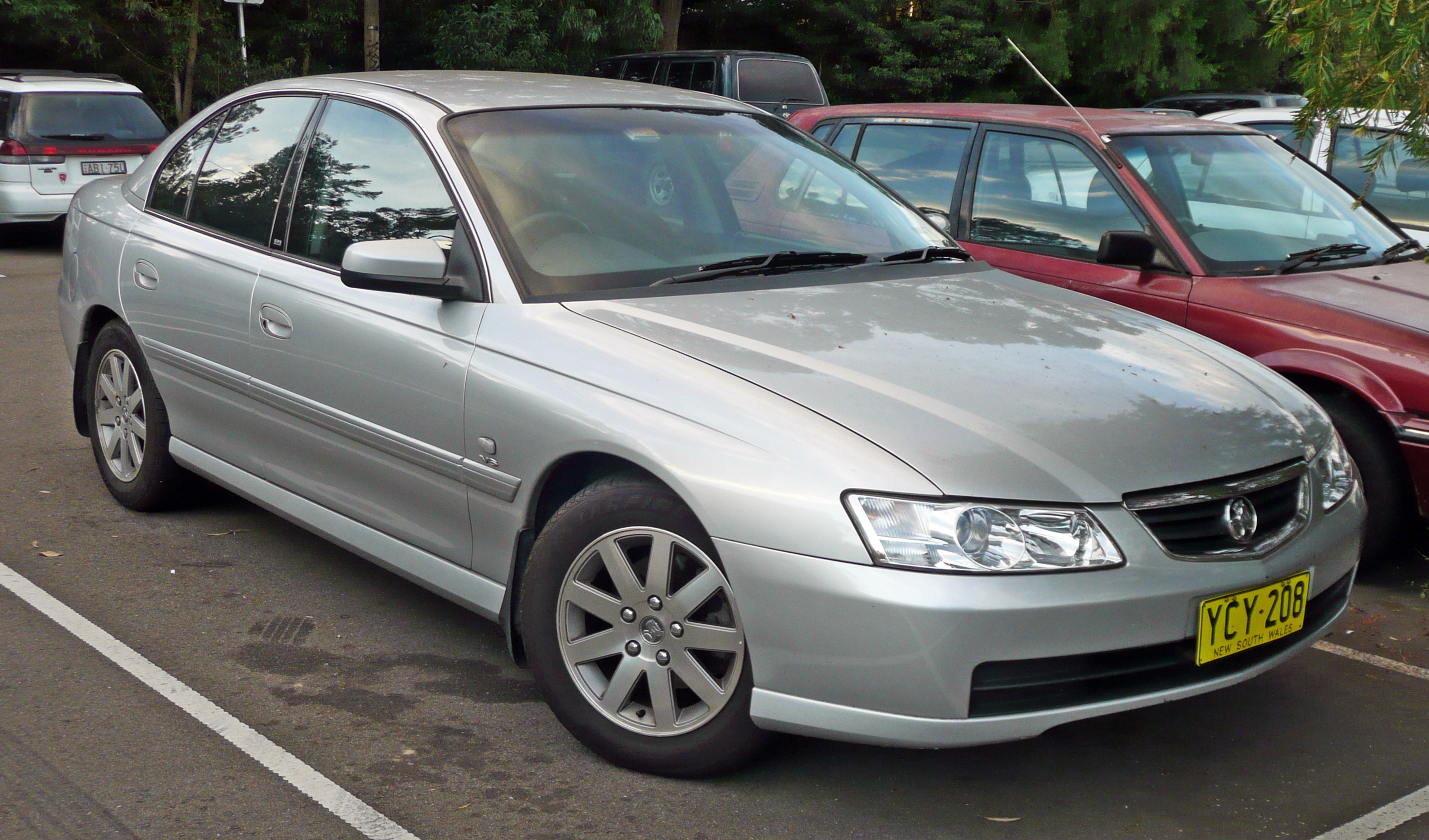
Holden Berlina (VY) sedan

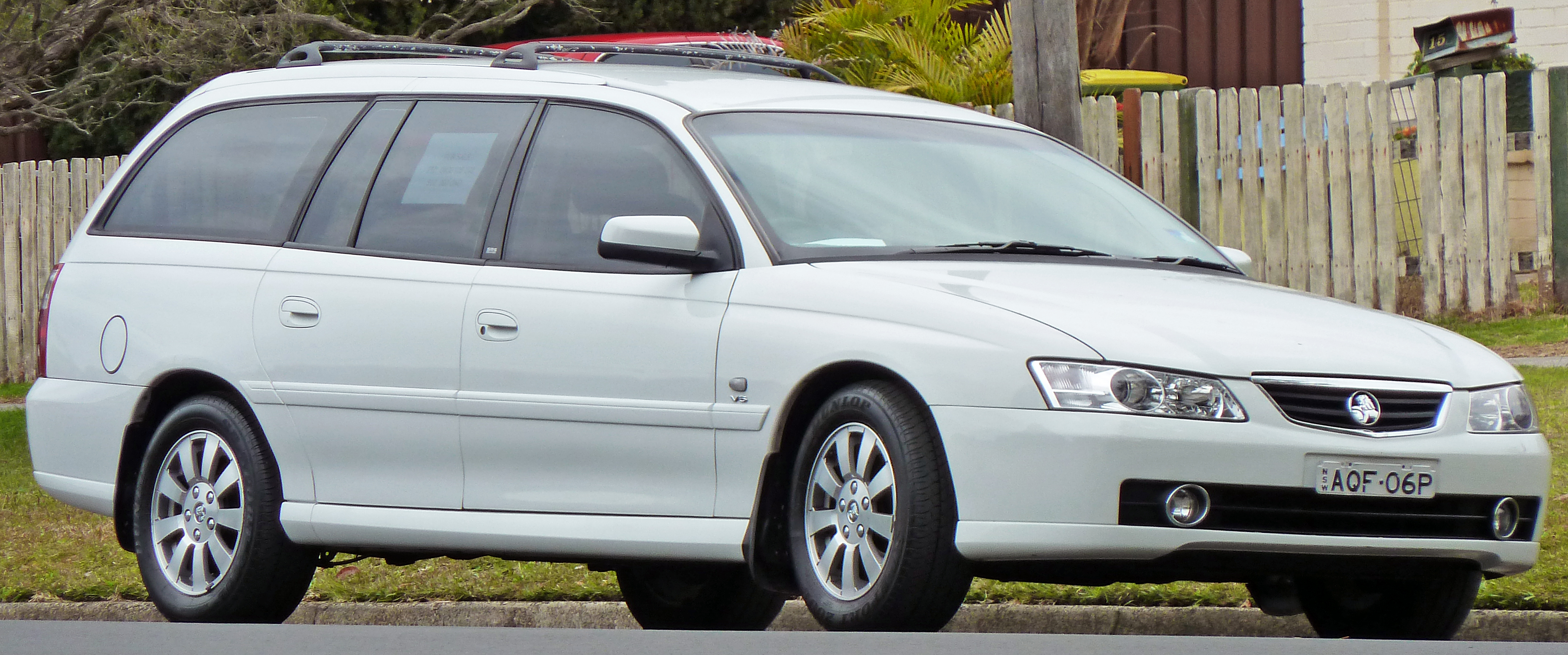
Holden Berlina (VY II) wagon

The Berlina is the semi-luxury version of the VY range; it sits above the Acclaim and below the Calais.

The Berlina features included:

- 3.8 L 152 kW (204 hp) ECOTEC V6 (option of 225 kW (302 hp) LS1 V8)
- 4-speed automatic transmission
- 6-disc in-dash CD player
- Anti-lock braking system (ABS)
- Brake assist (BA)
- Climate control air conditioning
- Cruise control
- Driver's and passenger's airbags
- Front and rear power windows
- Independent rear suspension (IRS)
- Power antenna
- Security system
- Side impact airbags (SIAB)
- Traction control system (TCS)
- Trip computer
- 16-inch alloy wheels

=== Berlina International ===
A limited run of 325 VY series 1 wagons (all in the colour Turbine Grey) was released in 2002. These were a level above the Berlina with some Calais options which include the following:

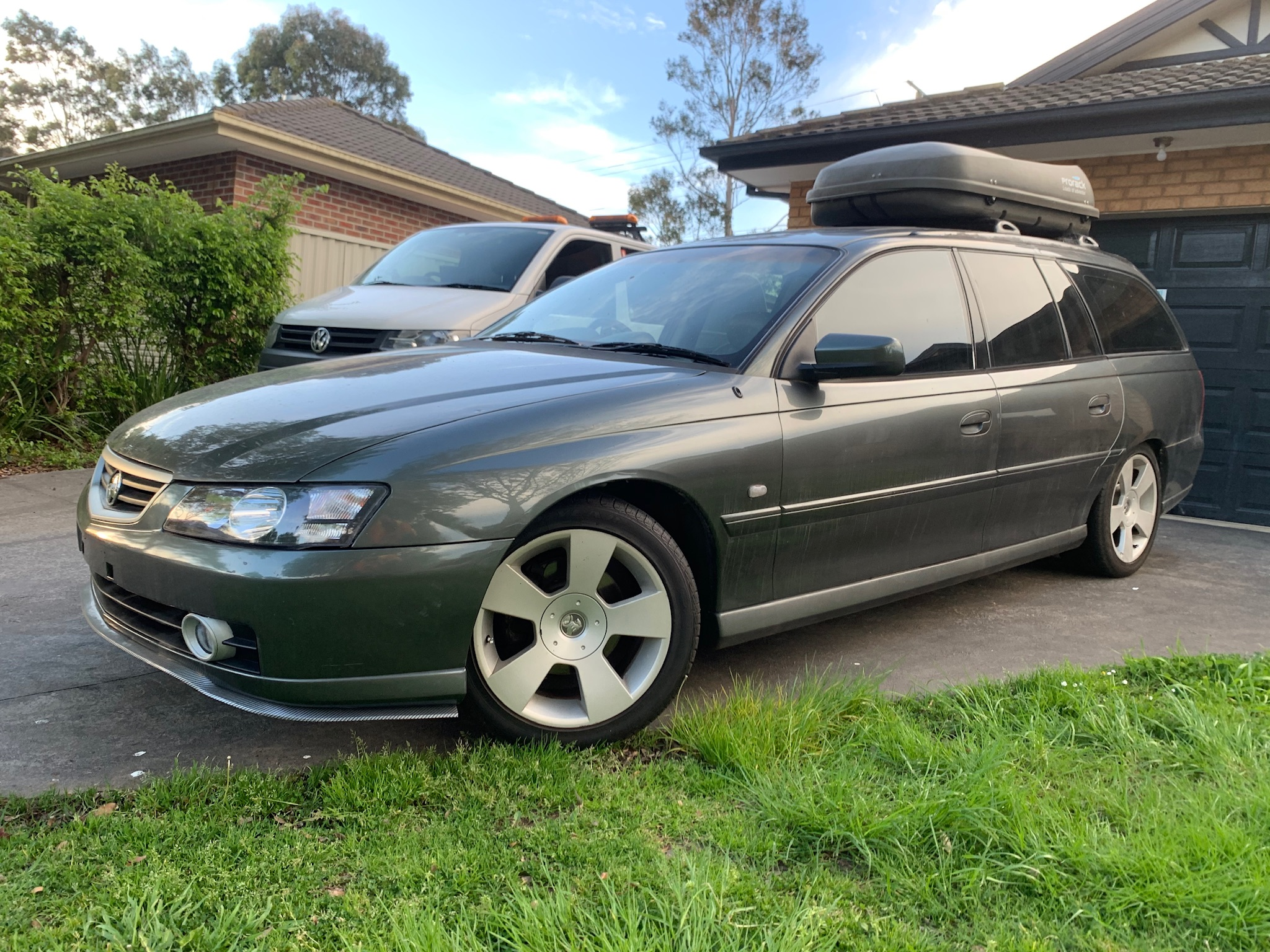

- Calais headlights
- Unique satin grey badging
- Dual-zone climate control
- 8-way electric front seats without memory function
- Pistachio Green leather seats with Racquet cloth inserts
- 4 custom floor mats
- 6-spoke alloy wheels from the WH Statesman

=== Calais ===
Colour range (expands)
Heron White (white)
Quicksilver (silver)
Turbine (gunmetal grey with green highlights)
Martini (gold with olive highlights)
Syracuse (metallic beige – Series II)
Phantom Black (black with silver highlights)
Redhot (red)
Shanghai (light burgundy)
Berry (dark burgundy)
Hothouse (lime green – Series I)
Laurel (dark green with gold highlights – Series I)
Cove (dark green with blue highlights – Series II)
Barbados (light blue with turquoise highlights – Series II)
Delft (medium blue – Series I)
Vespers (dark royal blue)
Cosmo (dark purple – Series II)

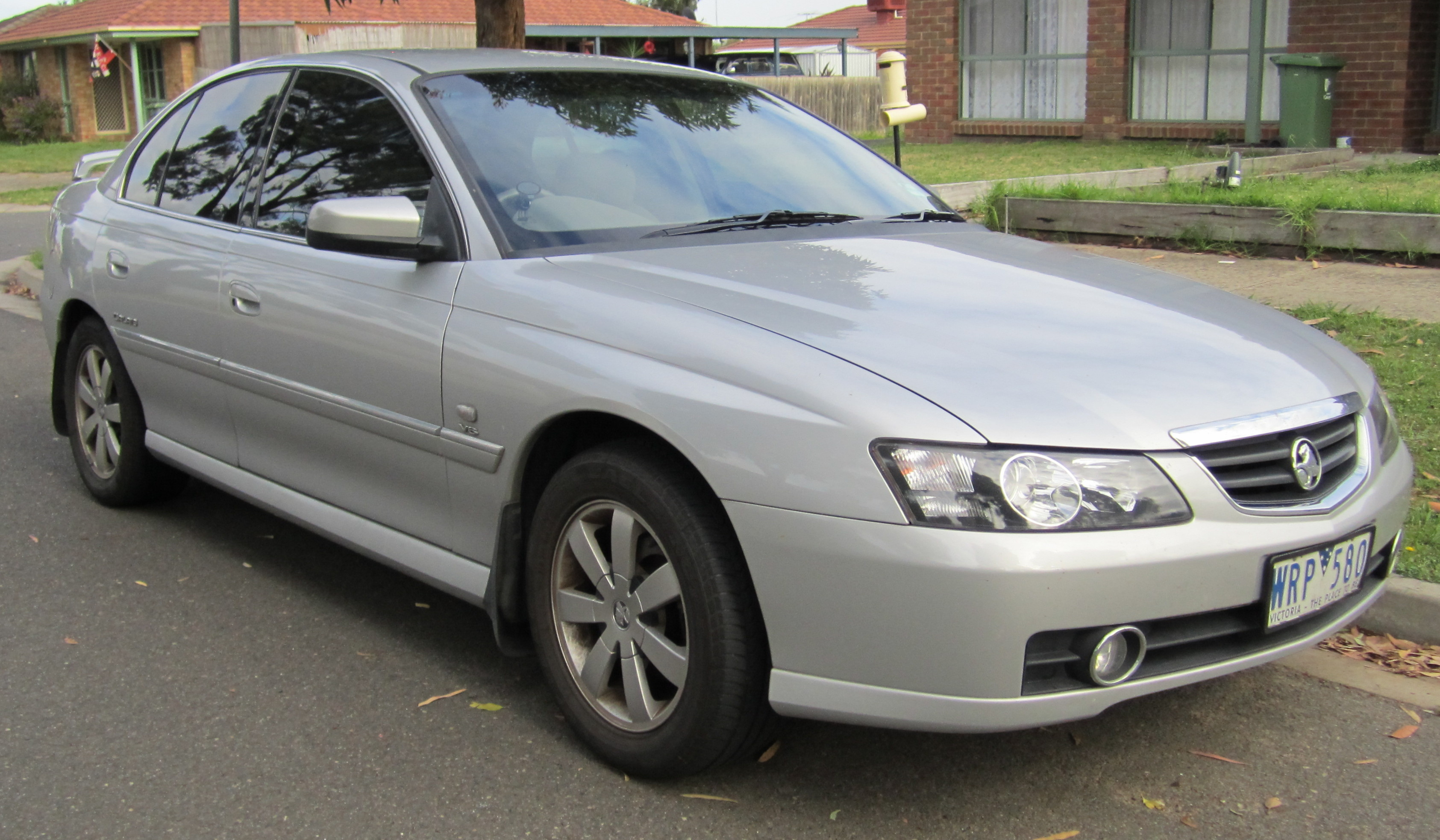
Holden Calais (VY) sedan

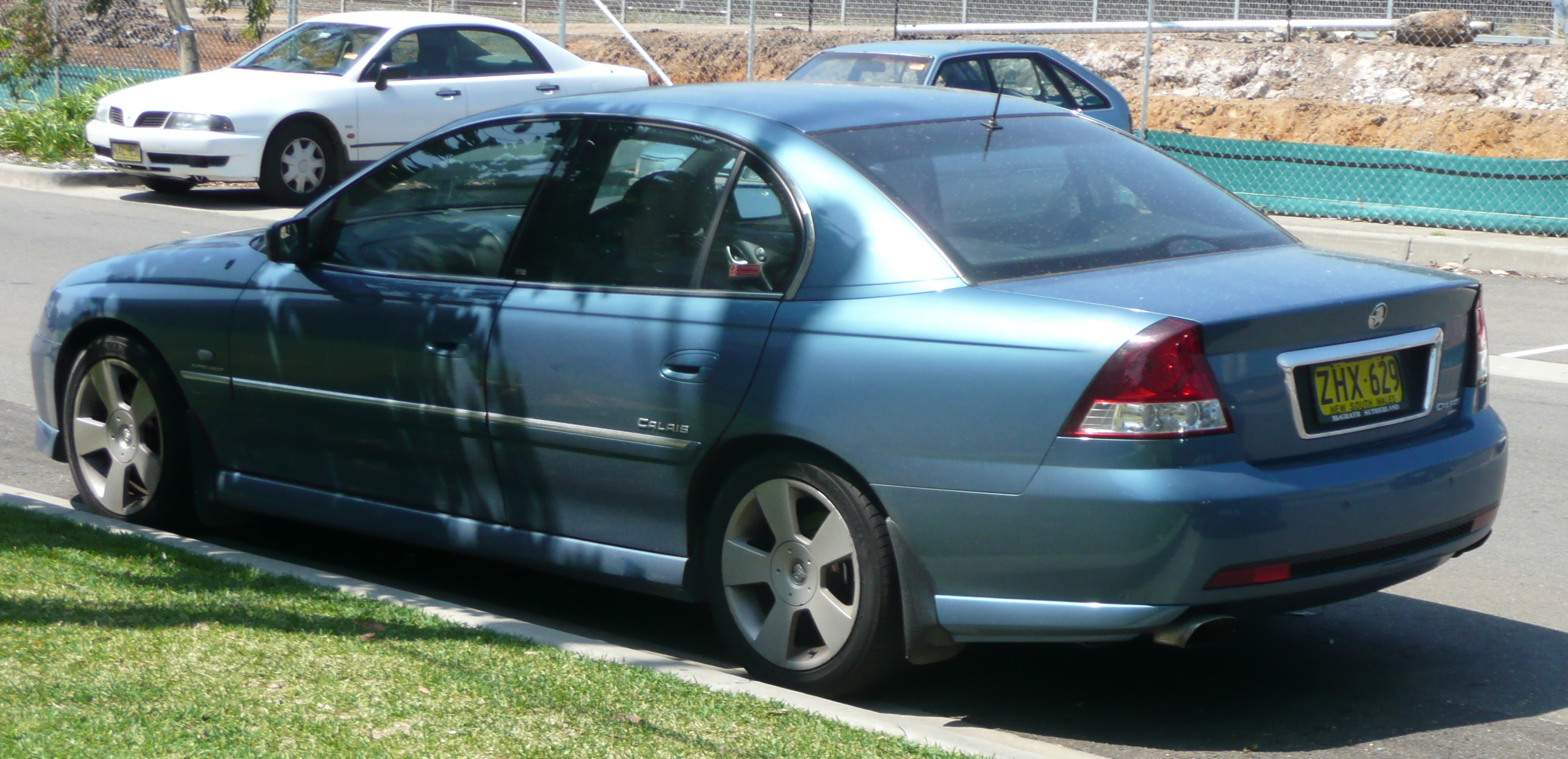
Holden Calais (VY II) sedan

The Calais is the top-of-the-line luxury model in the VY range; it sits above the Berlina and combines luxury with performance.

The Calais features included:

- 3.8 L 171 kW (229 hp) Supercharged ECOTEC V6 (option of 152 kW (204 hp) ECOTEC V6 or 225 kW LS1 V8 (302 hp) then 235 kW (315 hp) LS1 V8 in Series II)
- 4-speed automatic transmission
- 6-disc in-dash CD player
- Bose speakers
- Anti-lock braking system (ABS)
- Brake Assist (BA)
- Climate control air conditioning
- Cruise control
- Driver's and passenger's airbags
- Front and rear power windows
- Independent rear suspension (IRS)
- Luggage net
- Power antenna
- Rear park assist
- Security system
- Side-impact airbags (SIAB)
- Traction control system (TCS)
- Trip computer
- 16-inch alloy wheels [Series 1]
- 17-inch alloy wheels [Series 2]

=== Adventra ===
The Holden Adventra is Holden's first all-wheel drive variant built on the wagon platform. It was produced between October 2003 and February 2005 also acting as the basis of commercial derivates in the form of the Crewman Cross 8 and Holden Special Vehicles sports variants. The Adventra is based on the VY II Commodore station wagon but features an all-wheel drive configuration as opposed to a rear-wheel drive running gear. Available in two equipment levels—CX8 and LX8—with a standardised driveline consisting of a single powertrain combination. That being, a 5.7-litre Generation III V8 engine rated at 235 kilowatts (315 hp) and a four-speed automatic transmission.

Over the standard Commodore wagon, the Adventra adds a 60/40 split rear seat and additional gauges above the central ventilation outlets. Black plastic accents on the front and rear bumpers along with the wheel guards visually distinguished the Adventra from the Commodore.

Extra-cost options available included third-row seating, cargo hold down nets, and an off-road recovery kit.

Holden replaced the VY II with the VZ Adventra in 2004. An interim VZ Adventra appeared in August 2004 at the time of the release of the VZ Commodore range, but this was in essence the familiar VY body with VZ engine, running gear, ECU and a VZ compliance plate. A true VZ series facelift was introduced in February 2005 and with it, the introduction of a V6 engine as the principal power unit.

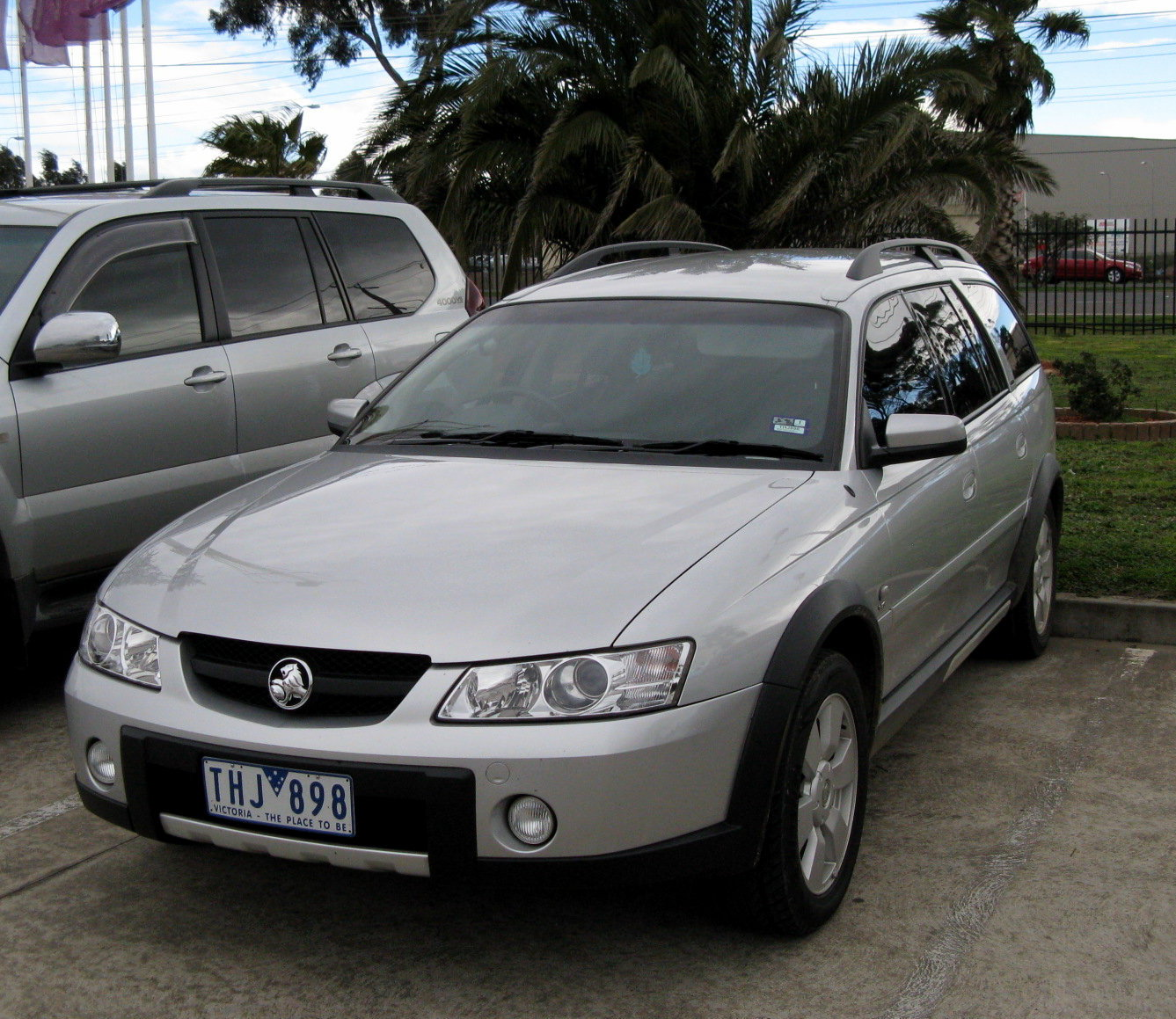
VY II Adventra CX8

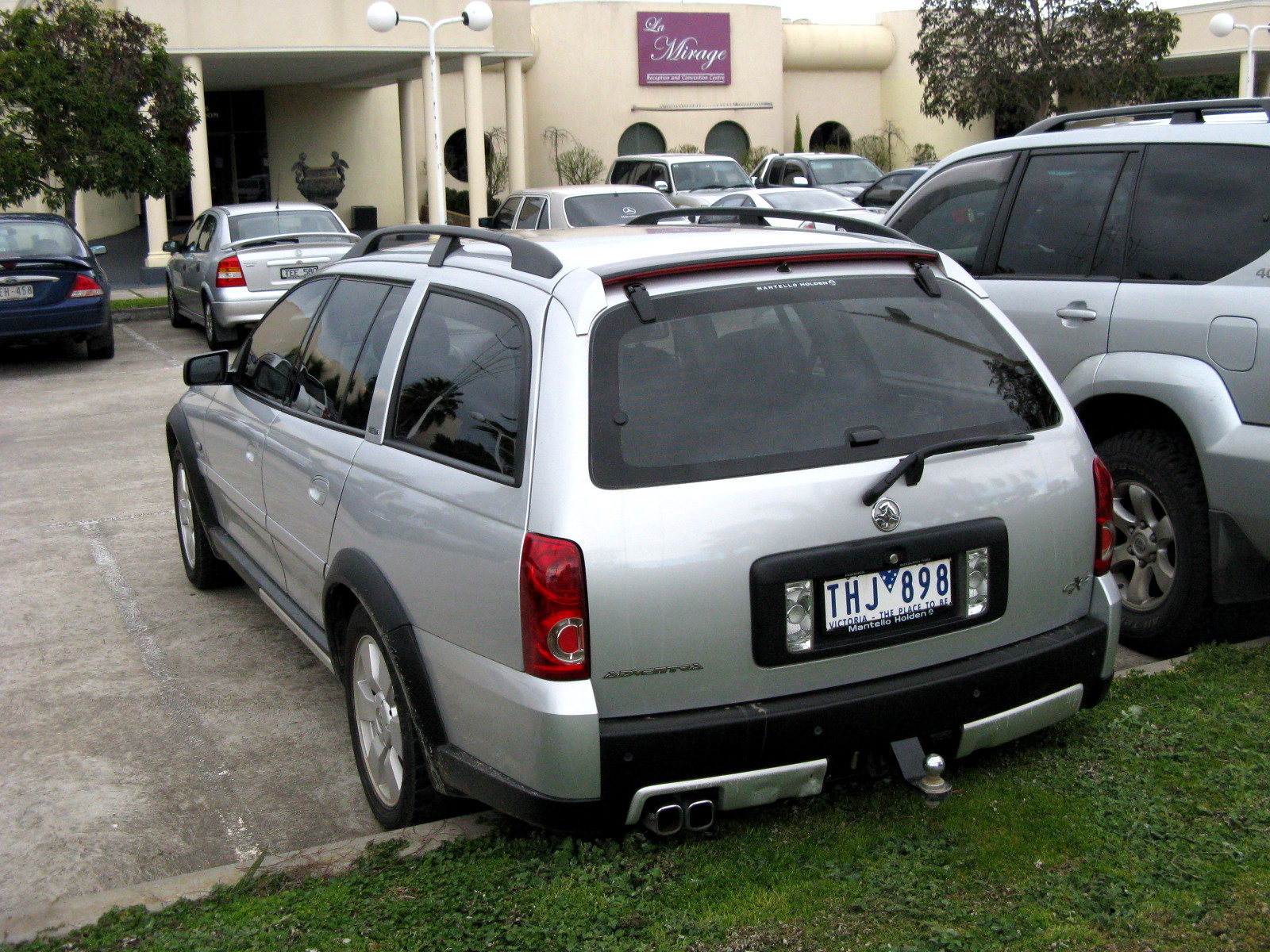
VY II Adventra CX8

== Commercial range ==
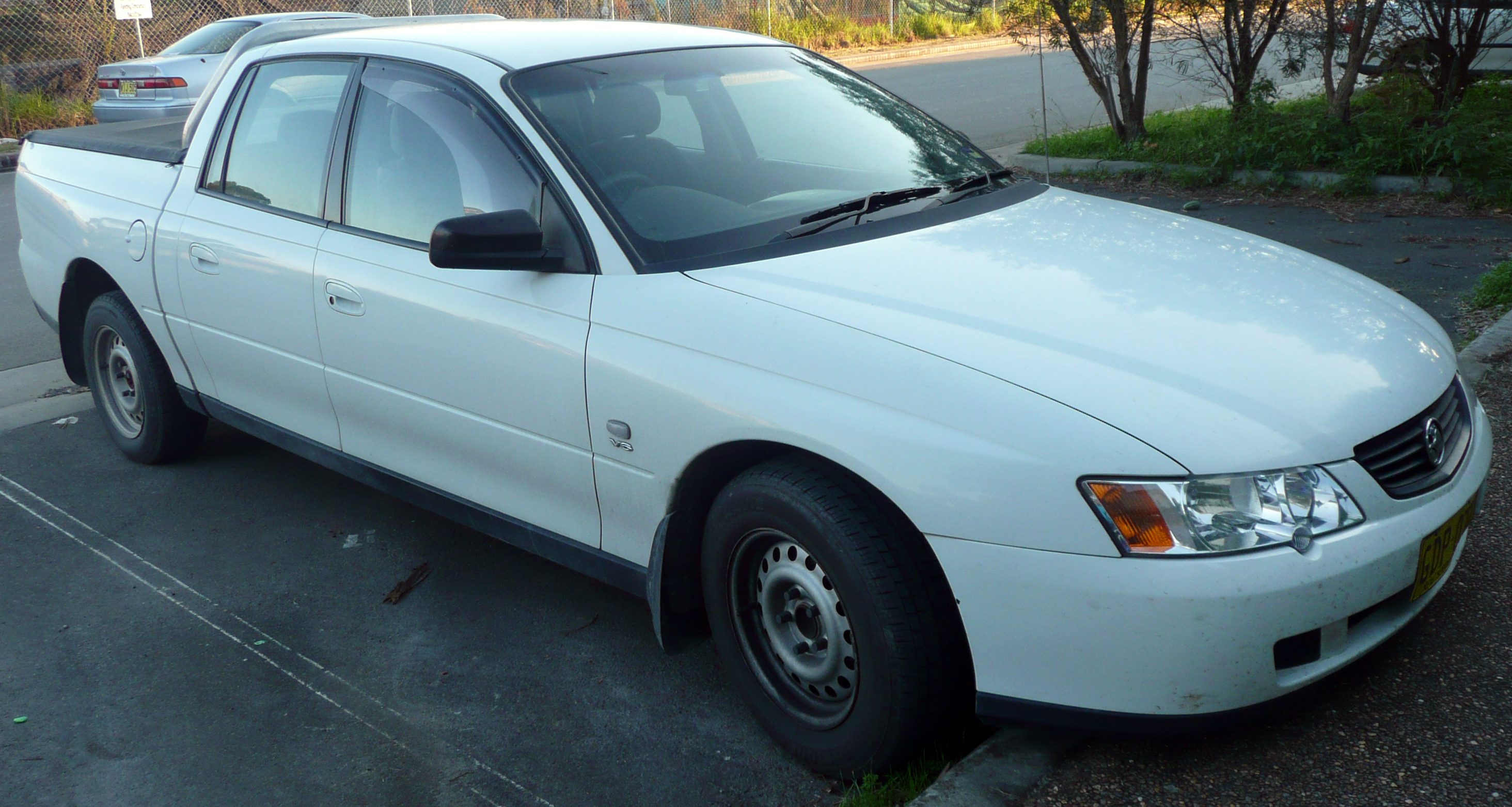
Holden Crewman (VY II)

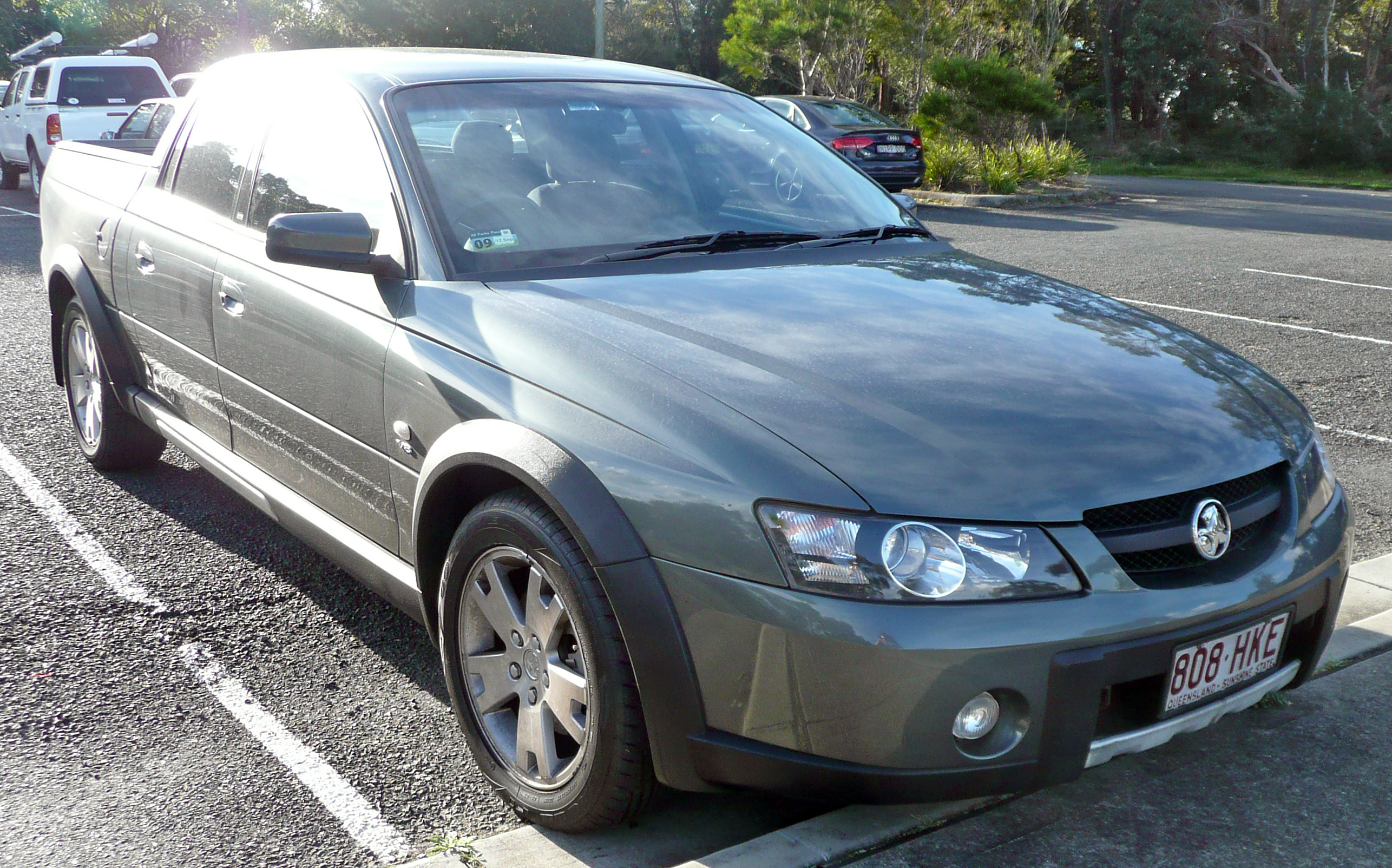
Holden Crewman (VY II) Cross 8

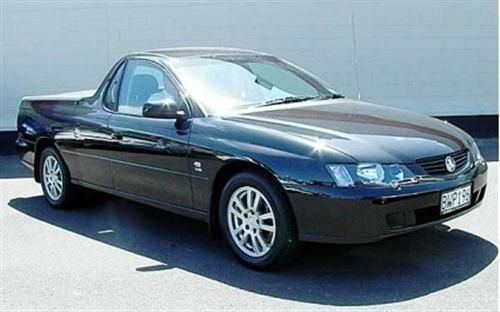
Holden Ute (VY II) S

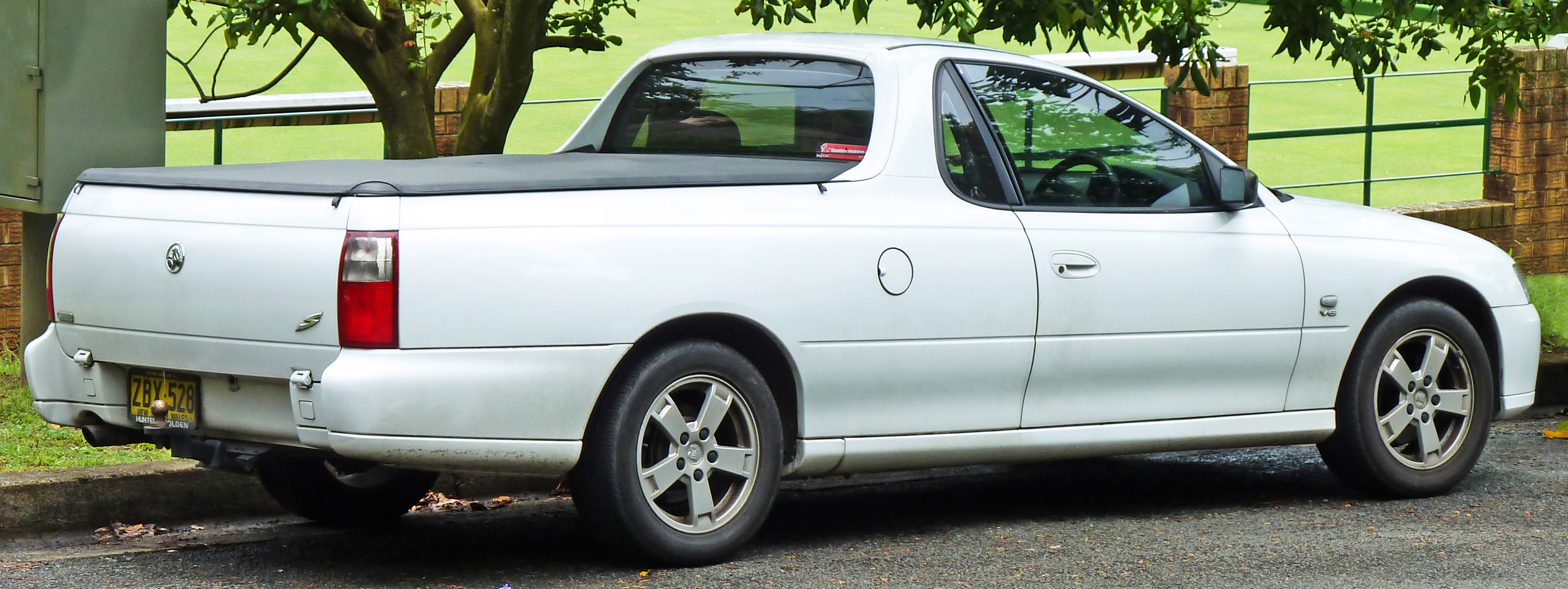
Holden Ute (VY) S

The VU Ute range was facelifted in September 2002 to create the VY-based Ute range. These commercial vehicles received the same upgrades as the sedan/wagon range, which involved a new, sharper-designed nose, and restyled interior. The same three specification models were carried over for the VY and picked up the same upgraded equipment lists as the VY sedans. The VY ute models were not badged as "Commodores".

The VY range marked major change for Holden's Ute range, with the 2003 addition of two new models: the return of the One Tonner cab-chassis utility after an 18-year hiatus; and the introduction of Holden's first-ever 4-door utility, arriving in the form of the Crewman. The Crewman brought a longer wheelbase – 3,206 mm (126.2 in) compared to the 2,939 mm (115.7 in) of the Ute; and a shorter tray – 1,463 mm (57.6 in) compared to the 2,193 mm (86.3 in) of the Ute In December 2003, Holden released an all-wheel drive variant of the Crewman known as the Crewman Cross 8. Powered by a 225 kW (302 hp) V8 engine, the Cross 8 featured a modified appearance, more suited to an off-road vehicle.

Both the Crewman and One Tonner models added instant sales to the Holden range, sparking rapid expansion of the Holden Ute range, its first major growth spurt since its 1990 reintroduction. Once again the same three specifications were carried over for the VY, with the Ute range available in base Ute, S & SS forms. The same did not apply for the One-Tonner cab-chassis range though – it was available in just two model forms, base and S.

- Base: Based on Commodore Executive specification. Available with 3.8-litre 152 kW (204 hp) Ecotec V6
- S : Based on Commodore S specification. Available with 3.8-litre 152 kW (204 hp) Ecotec V6 – 4sp auto, 5sp manual
- SS: Based on Commodore SS specification. 5.7-litre 235 kW (315 hp) Generation 3 V8 – 6sp manual or 4sp auto

Crewman models were on the other hand available with the same three specifications as the Ute range and were launched conjointly with the rest of Holden's VY Series 2 range, the major update this time being the addition of 10 kW (13 hp) to the Gen.3 V8. By December 2003, the Crewman range had expanded to include Holden's very first AWD utility in the form of the Crewman Cross 8. The Cross 8 received bolstered wheelarches, raised ride height as well as additional equipment, with the sole drivetrain being the recently upgraded Gen.3 V8 connected to a 4-speed automatic. V6-powered versions of the One Tonner & Crewman were only available with automatic transmission. The VY's were superseded by the arrival of the VZ range in August 2004.

== Safety ==
ANCAP test results Holden Commodore (2002)
| Test | Score |
|---|---|
| Overall | 4 /5 stars |
| Frontal offset | 12.79/16 |
| Side impact | 12.96/16 |
| Pole | Not Assessed |
| Seat belt reminders | 1/3 |
| Whiplash protection | Not Assessed |
| Pedestrian protection | Poor |
| Electronic stability control | Not Assessed |

== HSV range (Y Series) ==
The enhanced performance VY range sold by Holden Special Vehicles (HSV) is marketed as the Y Series and it comprised the variants listed below, alphabetically. For the first time, HSV stopped adopting the same series code as the mainstream donor cars in order to further differentiate its products.

=== Avalanche ===
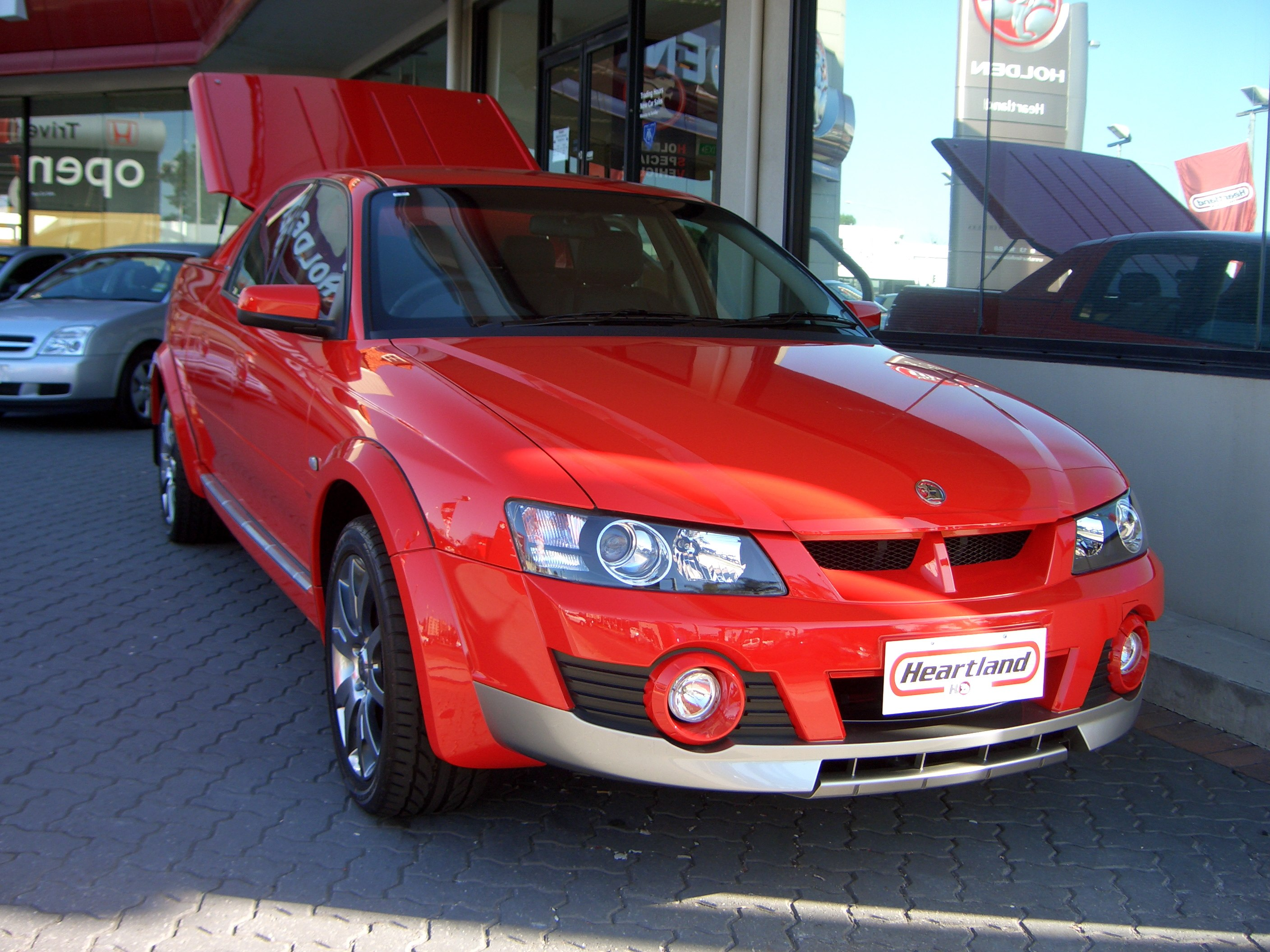

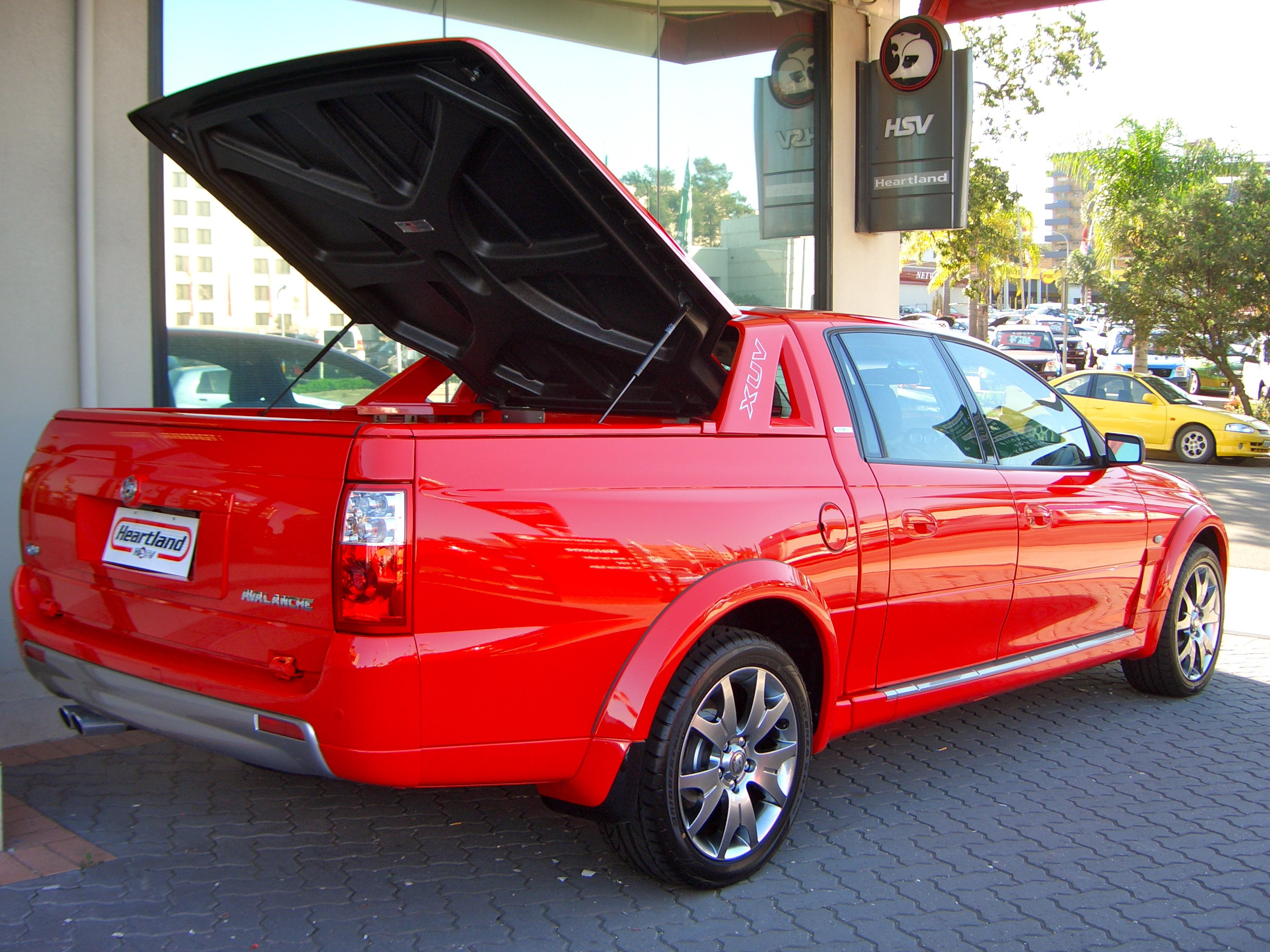
Avalanche XUV utility

The HSV Avalanche is an all-wheel drive crossover SUV that was manufactured by Holden Special Vehicles (HSV) between 2003 and 2005. Based on the Holden Adventra LX8 crossover wagon, the Avalanche range also incorporated a dual-cab utility model known as the HSV Avalanche XUV. The XUV derived from the Holden Crewman Cross8.

Both HSV vehicles were built in two series, the 2004 VY Series II (the wagon was actually available as of October/November 2003) and an updated version of the VY Series II, which included some of the upgrades found in the newer VZ Series HSV models. These later models are quite rare, with a building life of nine months from April 2005 to December 2005.

As with the related Holden VY all-wheel drive vehicles, the HSV "Y Series" AWD vehicles as built from September 2004 to March 2005 confusingly have "Z Series" compliance and Vehicle Identification Numbers; this correlates to the building of new specification Holden VZ and Z Series HSV non-AWD cars during this period.

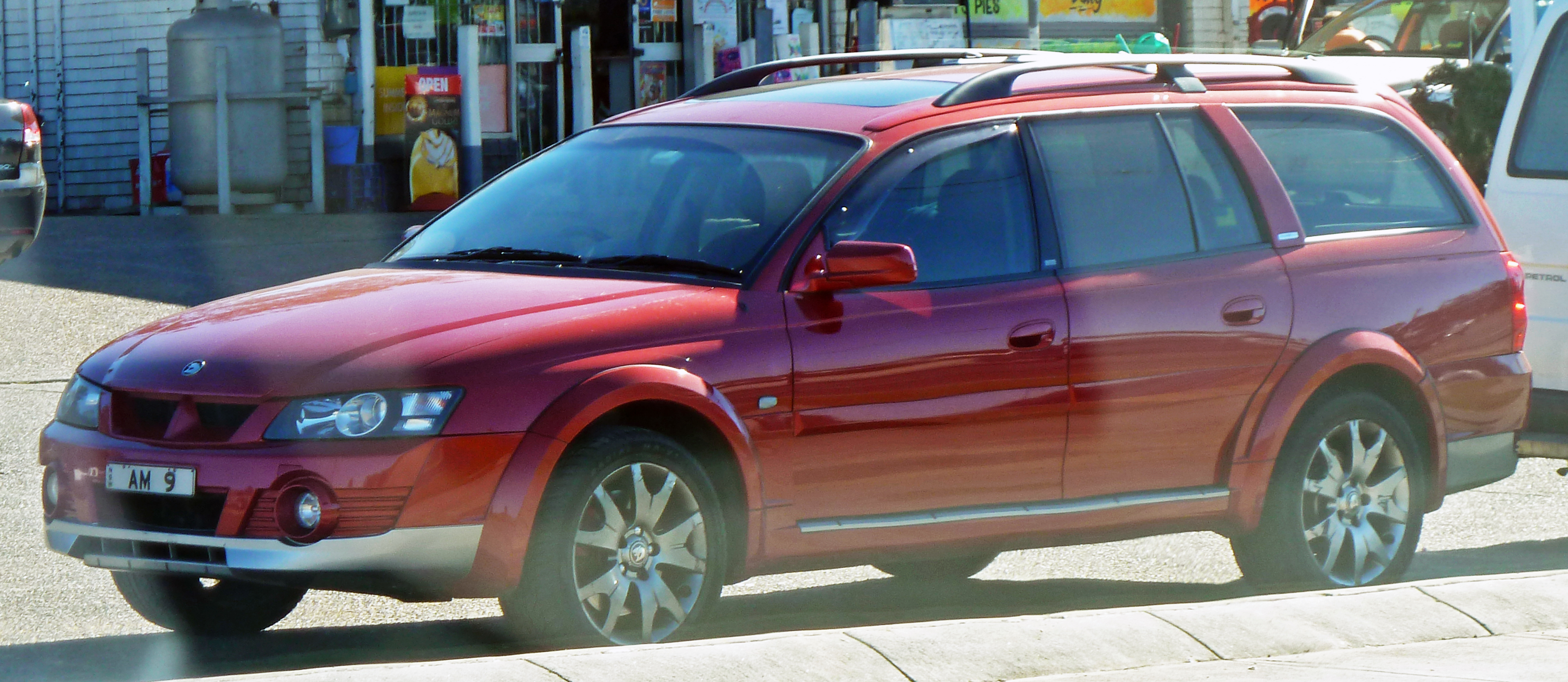
2003-2005 HSV Avalanche (Y Series II) wagon

The updated Avalanches with some of the VZ Series upgrades can be externally visually differentiated from the VY Series versions by their re-profiled front bumper unit that looks less aggressive and which features a more integrated appearance to the auxiliary driving lights.

The Avalanche vehicles were fitted exclusively with the 5.7-litre LS1 V8 engine rated at 270 kilowatts (360 hp) of power and 475 newton-metres (350 lb⋅ft) of torque, mated to a four-speed 4L65-E automatic gearbox. Permanent all-wheel drive was calibrated to deliver 62 percent of the power to the rear wheels, thereby maintaining a rear-wheel drive feel to the handling of these vehicles.

Along with Holden's V8 Commodore-based AWD vehicles, the HSV Avalanche series was discontinued in late 2005 due to phasing out of the 5.7-litre LS1 engines because of the Euro III emissions regulations.

=== Clubsport ===
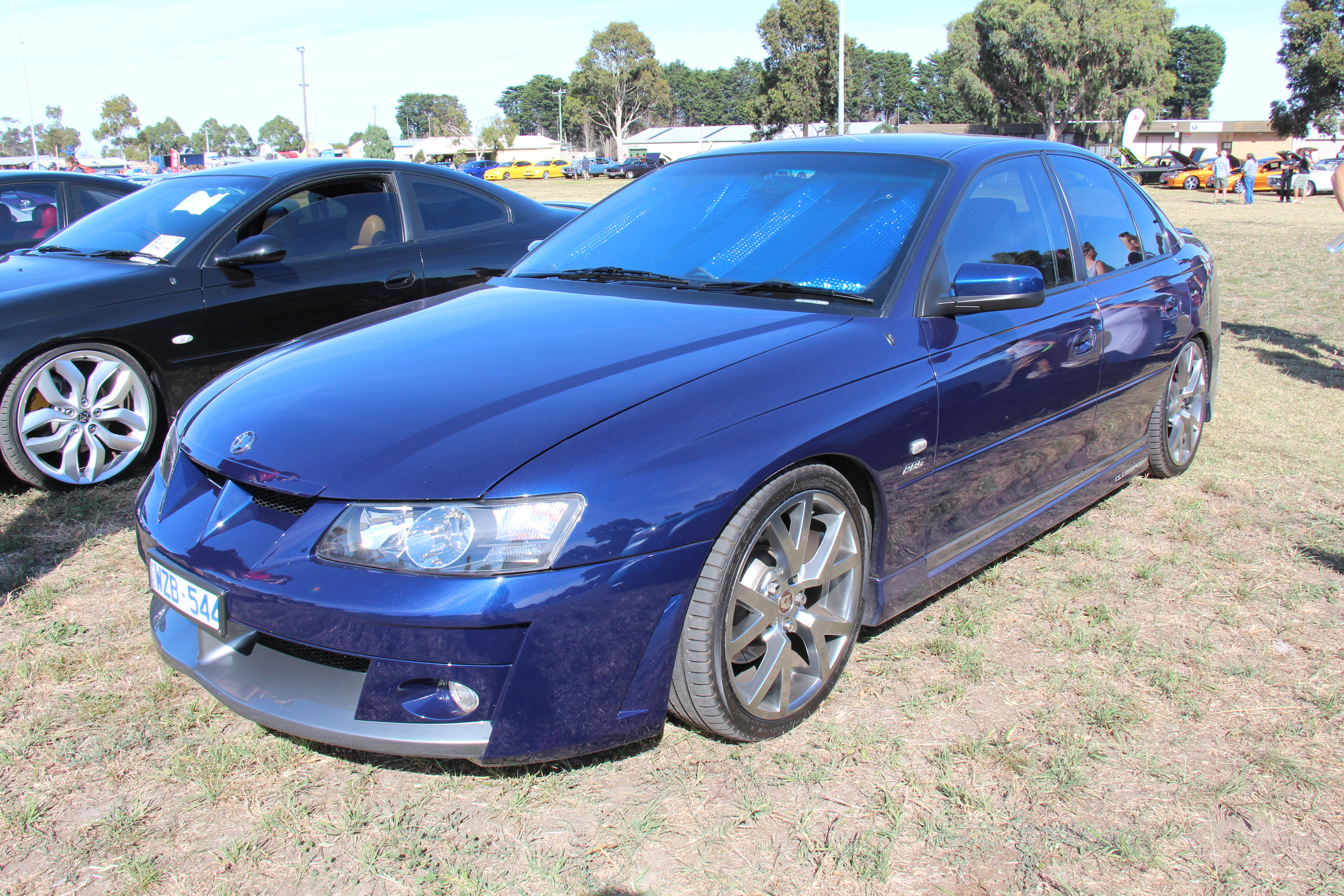
HSV Clubsport

VY Clubsport was based on the VY Holden Commodore frame. The V8 5.7litre GEN3 Chevrolet engine was revised to produce 260KW this model was available in 4 Speed auto or 6 Speed Manual.

=== GTS ===
VY GTS was a special order only vehicle with very limited build numbers, making it one of the most sought HSV's of the future. Only 100 of these cars were produced

=== Maloo ===
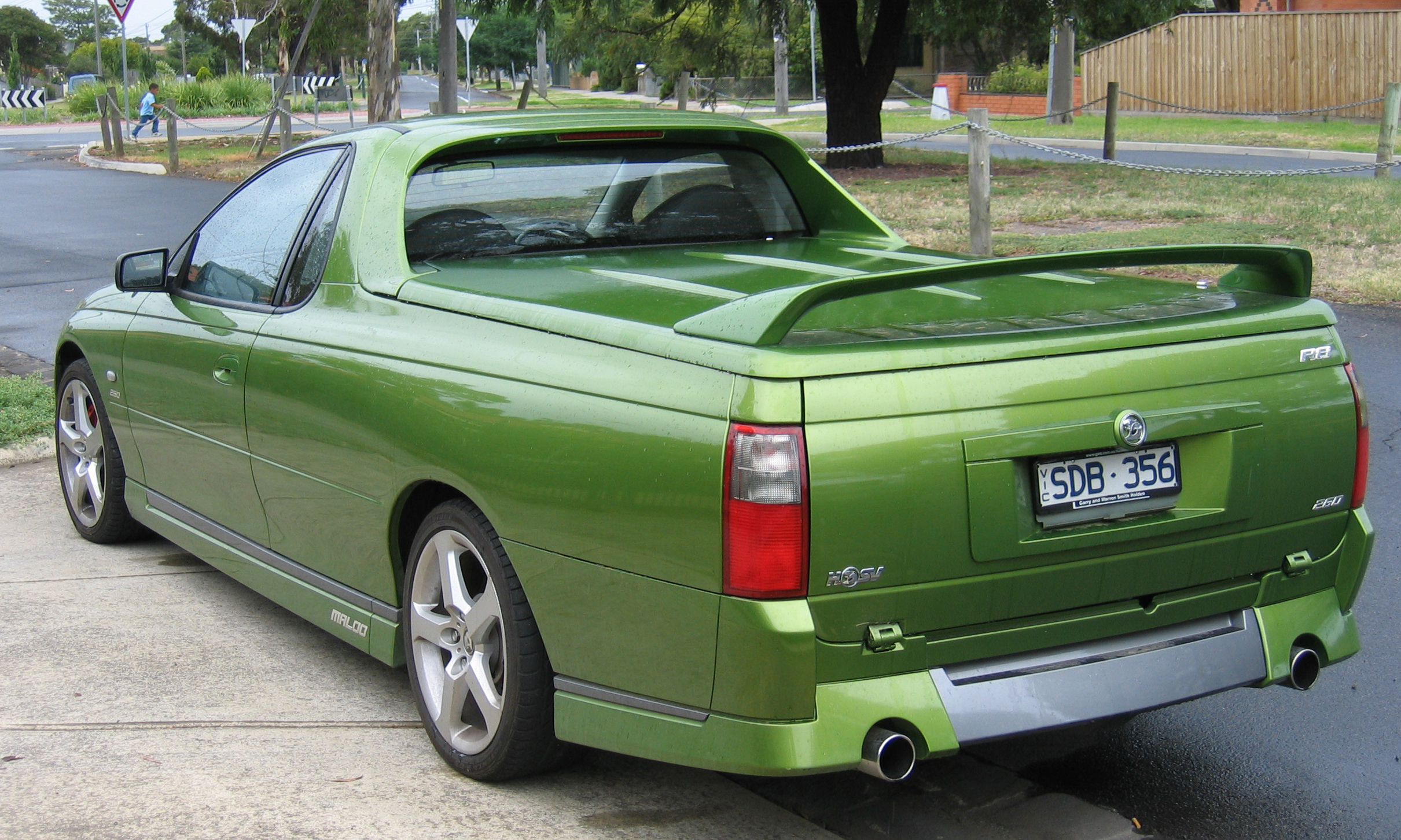
HSV Maloo R8 Utility

HSV's facelifted Y Series (as opposed to VY series in Holden terminology) was released in October 2002. The original Y Series Maloo utility retained the 5.7-litre LS1 engine from the VU, but power was increased to 260 kW (349 hp). Enhancements such as Climate Control air conditioning and the 'Performance' Brake System were made standard equipment on Maloo, with the 'Premium' Brake system now standard equipment on Maloo R8. New paint colours included Hothouse Green and Turbine Grey. 167 standard Maloo versions and 132 R8 models were produced in the first VY Series.

Y Series 2 was released in October 2003 in concert with HSV's Coupe Series 3 range, with the LS1 5.7-litre V8's engine power now increased to 285 kW (382 hp). New paint colours for the Maloo range were Syracuse (gold) and HSV Ultra Violet. 312 standard Maloo versions and 361 R8 models were produced in the VY Series 2.

=== Senator Signature ===
Following a slight change to the HSV series naming method, the Y Series Senators, based on the VY Commodore debuted in 2003. The Y-series naming method caused confusion with most people still calling it the VY. Featuring even more angular and aggressive styling, the Y series offered both an entry-level grand tourer Senator and high luxury Senator Signature models. Both came standard with a revised Luxury suspension tune, rear parking sensors and 260 kW (349 hp) LS1 engine. In addition to the features found on the Senator, the Senator Signature came with larger 19 in (482.6 mm) alloy wheels (the Senator came equipped with 18 in (457.2 mm) wheels), different seats and larger front brakes. The VY Series II update upgraded power to 285 kW (382 hp).

Some of the features that were introduced on the Y-series Senator include oil and battery gauges on the centre stack, shale leather trim interior trim as well as white backing for the instruments. A leather steering wheel was added to improve grip and feel when turning and more memory options for the front electric seats to cater to different users. HSV redesigned the front seats because of complaints from the customers they were too uncomfortable.

Standard features include a CD stacker, power mirrors and windows, cruise control, climate control, engine immobilizer and remote central locking. A rear DVD player and headphones were added. Front and side airbags were standard across the whole range. Two extra safety features were added: an electric tyre pressure monitoring system and High-Intensity Discharge (HID) driving lights. Once again the fully independent multi-link rear suspension is standard on the Senator. GPS or Satellite navigation and the sunroof are not standard with this model but are available at extra cost.

The engine is a 5.7-litre LS1 V8 pushing out 260 kW (349 hp) at 5600 rpm and 475 N⋅m (350 lb⋅ft) of torque. New badging featured on the Senator read "260" reflecting the increased power output. The brake and some of the engine cooling vents located on the front bumper are slightly hidden to keep its luxury well present while viewing the vehicle. Mesh cloth is located at the front air dams. Some of the side skirts front and rear air dams and the lower parts of the exterior mirrors are coloured in a satin finish grey. The rest is finished in the body colour. The famous "Senator" nameplates are featured on the side skirts, rear and at the bottom of the rear doors.

Some of the interior changes include alloy pedals, new colours, a re-designed four-spoke steering wheel with remote audio controls, white finish instrument dials and minor gauges now in their own dedicated binnacle in the centre of the dash. The multi-function read-out has been re-programmed to show the HSV logo and the vehicle build number and identification during start-up. Automatic climate control and a Blaupunkt 6-disc CD stacker are standard and 8 speakers. Carbon fibre trim is found throughout the cabin as well as light shale leather trim.

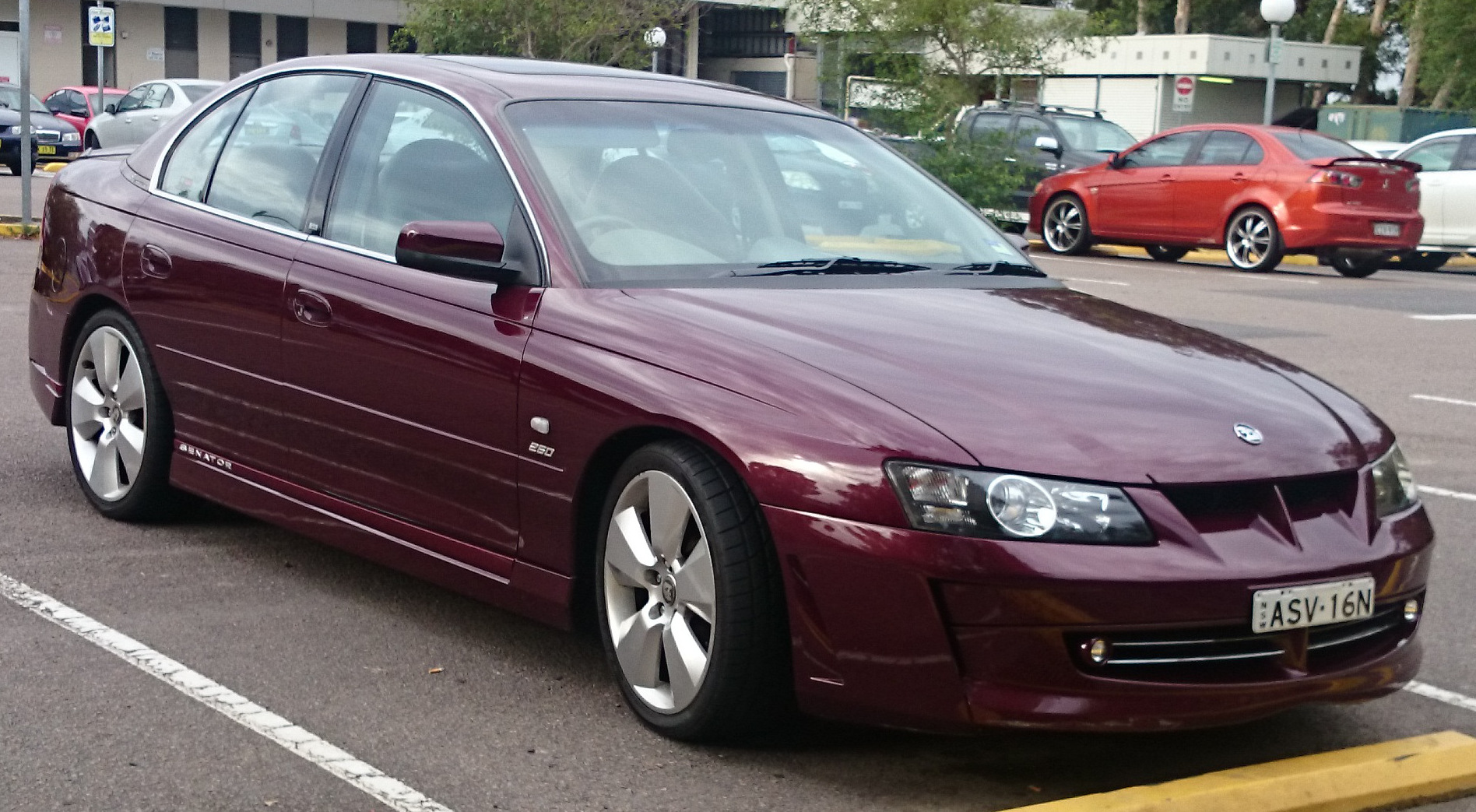
Holden VY HSV Senator

== Motorsport ==
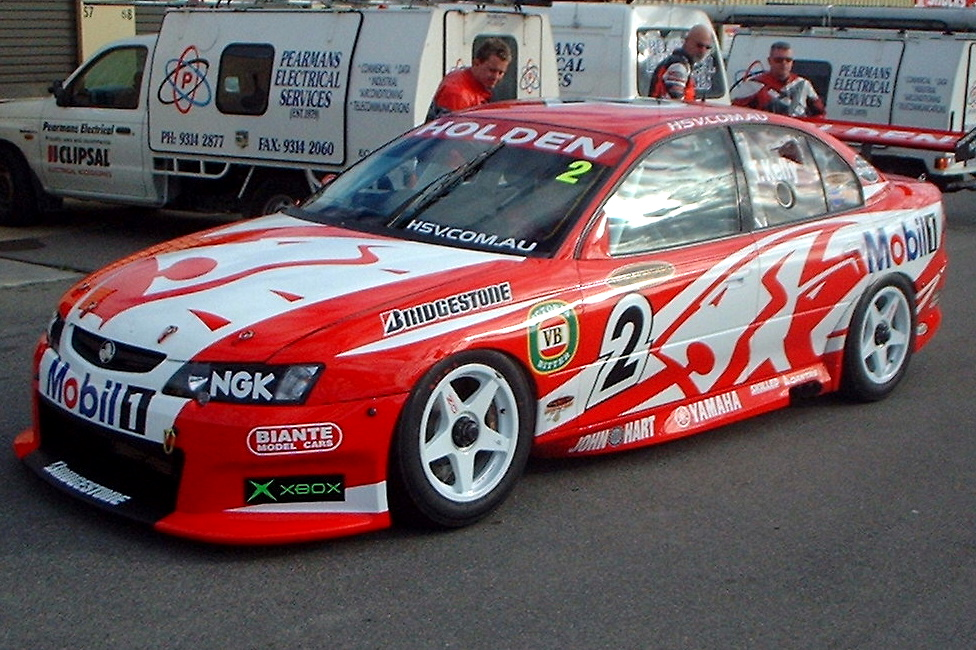
Holden Commodore VY V8 Supercar

The VY Commodore was used in the Supercars Championship between 2003-2005

== Exports ==
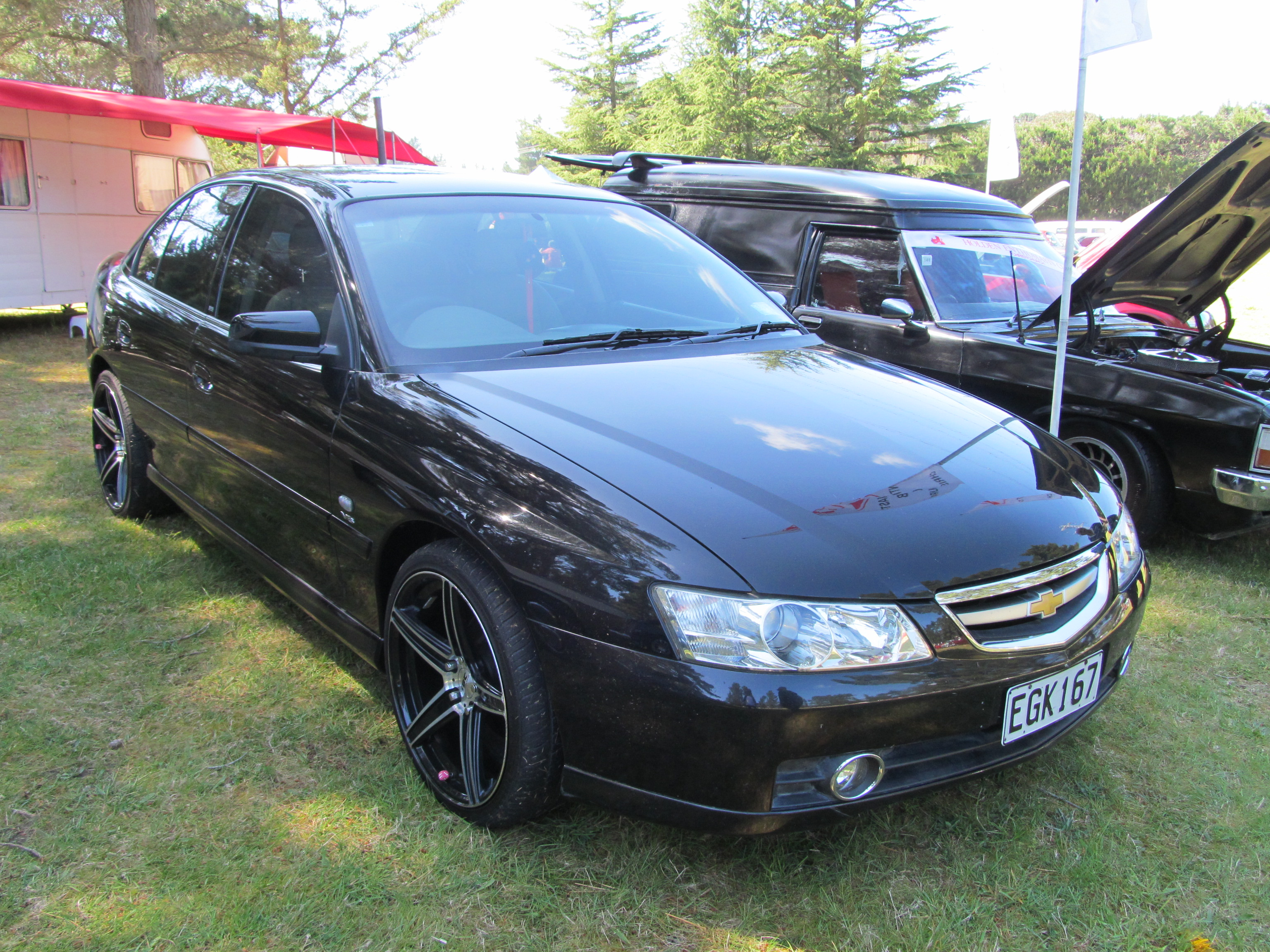
RHD Holden Commodore with Chevrolet badges (with non-standard wheels)

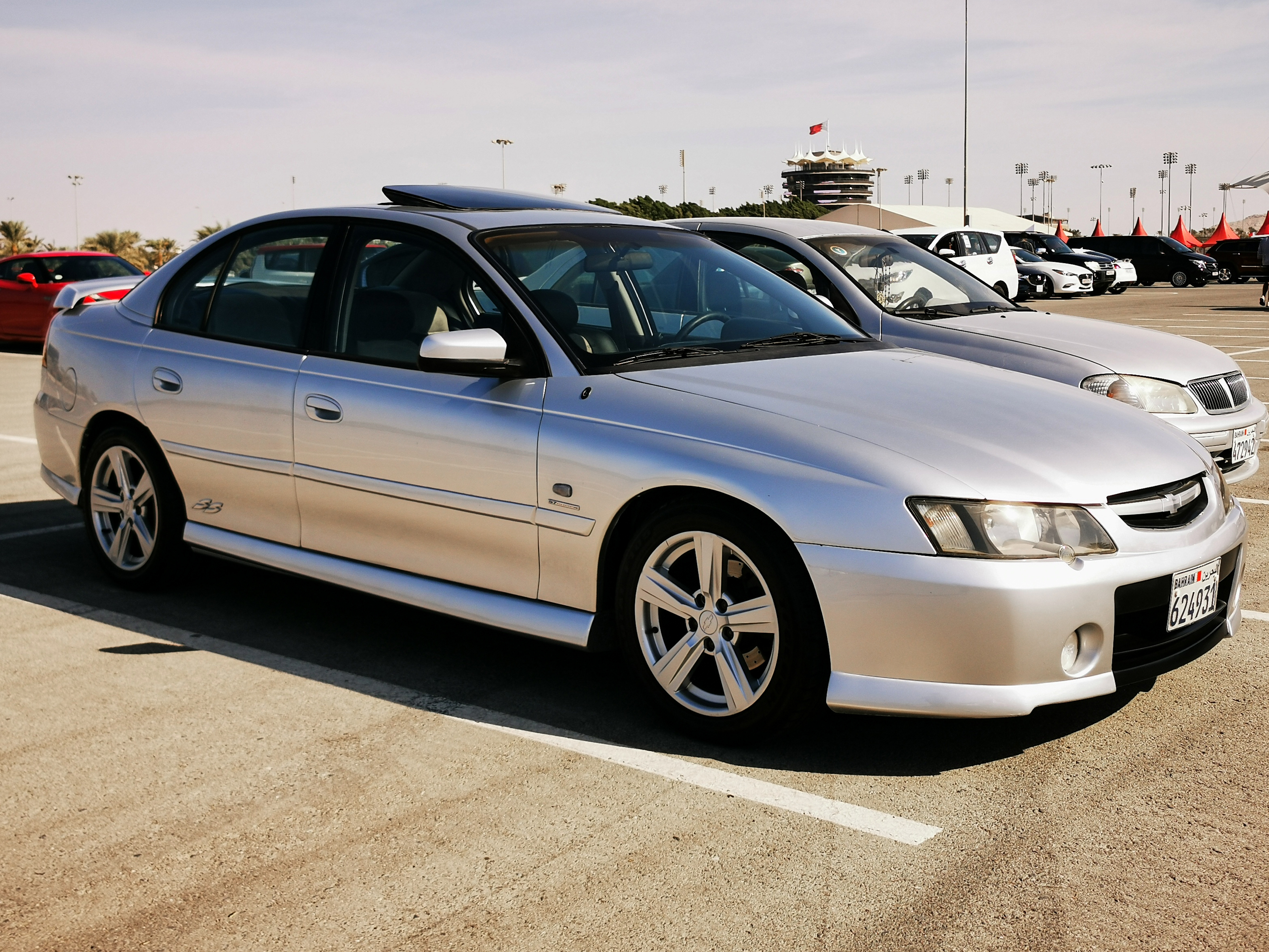
Chevrolet Lumina SS (Bahrain)

Exports of the VY were made to the Middle East as the Chevrolet Lumina from 2002 as per the previous VX series. Trim levels were the Lumina LS sedan and wagon (based on Commodore Executive), Lumina S (Commodore S), Lumina LTZ (Berlina), and Lumina SS (Commodore SS).

General Motors do Brasil imported the VY as the Chevrolet Omega from 2003 to replace the VX-based Omega. This update was announced 28 April 2003. The Brazilian model sold as a single-specification CD model, based on the Holden Calais. VY Omega sales ended in 2005 when replaced by the VZ-based model, as announced on 9 March 2005.

In September 2003, Chevrolet Lumina exports started in Malaysia in LTZ trim (based on the Holden Berlina), followed by Thailand in October with LTZ (Berlina) and S trims. Singapore was added as an export market by 2004 with the Lumina LTZ. Exports to Singapore ended during 2004; Malaysia and Thailand sales continued in VZ form from 2004.
