= 2012 Hamilton 400 =

2012 V8 Supercar championship race

(New Zealand) 2012 ITM Hamilton 400
Event Information
- Round 3 of 15 in the 2012 International V8 Supercars Championship
- Date: 20–22 April 2012
- Location: Hamilton, New Zealand
- Venue: Hamilton Street Circuit
- Weather: Fine

Results
Race 1
Distance	59 laps	200 km
Pole position	Garth Tander; Holden Racing Team	1:22:3968
Winner	Will Davison; Ford Performance Racing	1:28:43:7686
Race 2
Distance	59 laps	200 km
Pole position	Will Davison; Ford Performance Racing	1:21:9712
Winner	Mark Winterbottom; Ford Performance Racing	1:26:13:9903

The 2012 Hamilton 400 (known for naming rights reasons as the 2012 ITM Hamilton 400) was the third round of the 2012 International V8 Supercars Championship. It was the fifth and final V8 Supercar event to be held on the Hamilton Street Circuit and was held on the weekend of 20 to 22 April in Hamilton, New Zealand.

The event was dominated by the Ford Performance Racing team with Will Davison winning the Saturday race and Mark Winterbottom winning the Sunday race. Davison was the best performed driver over the whole weekend.

== Background ==
=== Support categories ===
Category	Races	Round winner
New Zealand V8s	3	(Australia) Jason Bargwanna (Ford Falcon (BF))
NZ V8 Ute Racing Series	3	(New Zealand) Andrew Waite (Ford Falcon (BF) Ute)
GT1 Sports Sedans	3	(New Zealand) Cameron Jones (Mazda RX666)
Muscle Touring Cars	3	(New Zealand) Dave O'Leary (Holden Torana)

== Race report ==
=== Race 5 ===
==== Qualifying ====
Pos.	No.	Name	Team	Vehicle	Time
1	6	(Australia) Will Davison	Ford Performance Racing	Ford Falcon (FG)	1:21.8149
2	888	(Australia) Craig Lowndes	Triple Eight Race Engineering	Holden Commodore (VE)	1:21.8439
3	2	(Australia) Garth Tander	Holden Racing Team	Holden Commodore (VE)	1:21.9151
4	5	(Australia) Mark Winterbottom	Ford Performance Racing	Ford Falcon (FG)	1:22.0255
5	1	(Australia) Jamie Whincup	Triple Eight Race Engineering	Holden Commodore (VE)	1:22.1327
6	55	(Australia) David Reynolds	Rod Nash Racing	Ford Falcon (FG)	1:22.1446
7	9	(New Zealand) Shane van Gisbergen	Stone Brothers Racing	Ford Falcon (FG)	1:22.1813
8	17	(Australia) Steven Johnson	Dick Johnson Racing	Ford Falcon (FG)	1:22.2711
9	18	(Australia) James Moffat	Dick Johnson Racing	Ford Falcon (FG)	1:22.3333
10	49	(Australia) Steve Owen	Paul Morris Motorsport	Ford Falcon (FG)	1:22.3658
11	4	(Australia) Lee Holdsworth	Stone Brothers Racing	Ford Falcon (FG)	1:22.3812
12	3	(Australia) Tony D'Alberto	Tony D'Alberto Racing	Ford Falcon (FG)	1:22.4124
13	19	(Australia) Jonathon Webb	Tekno Autosports	Holden Commodore (VE)	1:22.4323
14	15	(Australia) Rick Kelly	Kelly Racing	Holden Commodore (VE)	1:22.5330
15	14	(New Zealand) Fabian Coulthard	Brad Jones Racing	Holden Commodore (VE)	1:22.6396
16	66	(Australia) Russell Ingall	Walkinshaw Racing	Holden Commodore (VE)	1:22.6574
17	22	(Australia) James Courtney	Holden Racing Team	Holden Commodore (VE)	1:22.8369
18	34	(Australia) Michael Caruso	Garry Rogers Motorsport	Holden Commodore (VE)	1:22.8786
19	51	(New Zealand) Greg Murphy	Kelly Racing	Holden Commodore (VE)	1:22.9056
20	47	(Australia) Tim Slade	James Rosenberg Racing	Ford Falcon (FG)	1:22.9210
21	7	(Australia) Todd Kelly	Kelly Racing	Holden Commodore (VE)	1:22.9507
22	91	(Australia) Michael Patrizi	Tekno Autosports	Holden Commodore (VE)	1:23.0538
23	33	(France) Alexandre Prémat	Garry Rogers Motorsport	Holden Commodore (VE)	1:23.0662
24	12	(Australia) Dean Fiore	Triple F Racing	Ford Falcon (FG)	1:23.1030
25	11	(Australia) Karl Reindler	Kelly Racing	Holden Commodore (VE)	1:23.2122
26	30	(Australia) Taz Douglas	Lucas Dumbrell Motorsport	Holden Commodore (VE)	1:23.2146
27	8	(Australia) Jason Bright	Brad Jones Racing	Holden Commodore (VE)	1:23.2378
28	21	(Australia) David Wall	Britek Motorsport	Holden Commodore (VE)	1:23.9033

==== Race ====
Pos.	No.	Name	Team	Vehicle	Laps	Time/Retired	Grid
1	6	(Australia) Will Davison	Ford Performance Racing	Ford Falcon (FG)	59	1:28:43.7686	1
2	1	(Australia) Jamie Whincup	Triple Eight Race Engineering	Holden Commodore (VE)	59	+ 2.528	3
3	2	(Australia) Garth Tander	Holden Racing Team	Holden Commodore (VE)	59	+ 4.518	7
4	888	(Australia) Craig Lowndes	Triple Eight Race Engineering	Holden Commodore (VE)	59	+ 4.826	4
5	15	(Australia) Rick Kelly	Kelly Racing	Holden Commodore (VE)	59	+ 21.294	12
6	49	(Australia) Steve Owen	Paul Morris Motorsport	Holden Commodore (VE)	59	+ 23.580	11
7	22	(Australia) James Courtney	Holden Racing Team	Holden Commodore (VE)	59	+ 25.186	17
8	34	(Australia) Michael Caruso	Garry Rogers Motorsport	Holden Commodore (VE)	59	+ 25.457	19
9	14	(New Zealand) Fabian Coulthard	Brad Jones Racing	Holden Commodore (VE)	59	+ 25.822	8
10	66	(Australia) Russell Ingall	Walkinshaw Racing	Holden Commodore (VE)	59	+ 26.067	21
11	17	(Australia) Steven Johnson	Dick Johnson Racing	Ford Falcon (FG)	59	+ 26.894	13
12	8	(Australia) Jason Bright	Brad Jones Racing	Holden Commodore (VE)	59	+ 30.299	23
13	4	(Australia) Lee Holdsworth	Stone Brothers Racing	Ford Falcon (FG)	59	+ 32.074	10
14	7	(Australia) Todd Kelly	Kelly Racing	Holden Commodore (VE)	59	+ 32.301	15
15	47	(Australia) Tim Slade	James Rosenberg Racing	Ford Falcon (FG)	59	+ 32.584	18
16	12	(Australia) Dean Fiore	Triple F Racing	Ford Falcon (FG)	59	+ 36.998	22
17	91	(Australia) Michael Patrizi	Tekno Autosports	Holden Commodore (VE)	59	+ 39.289	20
18	3	(Australia) Tony D'Alberto	Tony D'Alberto Racing	Ford Falcon (FG)	59	+ 52.114	6
19	19	(Australia) Jonathon Webb	Tekno Autosports	Holden Commodore (VE)	59	+ 59.625	16
20	30	(Australia) Taz Douglas	Lucas Dumbrell Motorsport	Holden Commodore (VE)	59	+ 1:03.772	25
21	21	(Australia) David Wall	Britek Motorsport	Holden Commodore (VE)	58	+ 1 lap	27
22	9	(New Zealand) Shane van Gisbergen	Stone Brothers Racing	Ford Falcon (FG)	58	+ 1 lap	14
23	5	(Australia) Mark Winterbottom	Ford Performance Racing	Ford Falcon (FG)	57	+ 2 laps	2
Ret	55	(Australia) David Reynolds	Rod Nash Racing	Ford Falcon (FG)	52	Retired	5
Ret	11	(Australia) Karl Reindler	Kelly Racing	Holden Commodore (VE)	39	Retired	26
Ret	33	(France) Alexandre Prémat	Garry Rogers Motorsport	Holden Commodore (VE)	36	Retired	28
Ret	51	(New Zealand) Greg Murphy	Kelly Racing	Holden Commodore (VE)	29	Retired	24
Ret	18	(Australia) James Moffat	Dick Johnson Racing	Ford Falcon (FG)	17	Retired	9
Fastest lap: Garth Tander (Holden Racing Team) - 1:22.9366 on lap 46

=== Race 6 ===
==== Qualifying ====
Pos.	No.	Name	Team	Vehicle	Time
1	6	(Australia) Will Davison	Ford Performance Racing	Ford Falcon (FG)	1:21.9712
2	5	(Australia) Mark Winterbottom	Ford Performance Racing	Ford Falcon (FG)	1:21.9858
3	1	(Australia) Jamie Whincup	Triple Eight Race Engineering	Holden Commodore (VE)	1:21.9914
4	888	(Australia) Craig Lowndes	Triple Eight Race Engineering	Holden Commodore (VE)	1:22.1295
5	55	(Australia) David Reynolds	Rod Nash Racing	Ford Falcon (FG)	1:22.1684
6	3	(Australia) Tony D'Alberto	Tony D'Alberto Racing	Ford Falcon (FG)	1:22.2423
7	2	(Australia) Garth Tander	Holden Racing Team	Holden Commodore (VE)	1:22.3789
8	14	(New Zealand) Fabian Coulthard	Brad Jones Racing	Holden Commodore (VE)	1:22.4135
9	18	(Australia) James Moffat	Dick Johnson Racing	Ford Falcon (FG)	1:22.4538
10	4	(Australia) Lee Holdsworth	Stone Brothers Racing	Ford Falcon (FG)	1:22.4970
11	49	(Australia) Steve Owen	Paul Morris Motorsport	Ford Falcon (FG)	1:22.5042
12	15	(Australia) Rick Kelly	Kelly Racing	Holden Commodore (VE)	1:22.5156
13	17	(Australia) Steven Johnson	Dick Johnson Racing	Ford Falcon (FG)	1:22.5367
14	9	(New Zealand) Shane van Gisbergen	Stone Brothers Racing	Ford Falcon (FG)	1:22.5528
15	7	(Australia) Todd Kelly	Kelly Racing	Holden Commodore (VE)	1:22.6571
16	19	(Australia) Jonathon Webb	Tekno Autosports	Holden Commodore (VE)	1:22.6739
17	22	(Australia) James Courtney	Holden Racing Team	Holden Commodore (VE)	1:22.6950
18	47	(Australia) Tim Slade	James Rosenberg Racing	Ford Falcon (FG)	1:22.7021
19	34	(Australia) Michael Caruso	Garry Rogers Motorsport	Holden Commodore (VE)	1:22.9390
20	91	(Australia) Michael Patrizi	Tekno Autosports	Holden Commodore (VE)	1:22.9901
21	66	(Australia) Russell Ingall	Walkinshaw Racing	Holden Commodore (VE)	1:23.0240
22	12	(Australia) Dean Fiore	Triple F Racing	Ford Falcon (FG)	1:23.1494
23	8	(Australia) Jason Bright	Brad Jones Racing	Holden Commodore (VE)	1:23.1999
24	51	(New Zealand) Greg Murphy	Kelly Racing	Holden Commodore (VE)	1:23.2946
25	30	(Australia) Taz Douglas	Lucas Dumbrell Motorsport	Holden Commodore (VE)	1:23.3398
26	11	(Australia) Karl Reindler	Kelly Racing	Holden Commodore (VE)	1:23.4898
27	21	(Australia) David Wall	Britek Motorsport	Holden Commodore (VE)	1:23.7206
28	33	(France) Alexandre Prémat	Garry Rogers Motorsport	Holden Commodore (VE)	1:23.7991

==== Race ====
Pos.	No.	Name	Team	Vehicle	Laps	Time/Retired	Grid
1	5	(Australia) Mark Winterbottom	Ford Performance Racing	Ford Falcon (FG)	59	01:26:13.9903	2
2	1	(Australia) Jamie Whincup	Triple Eight Race Engineering	Holden Commodore (VE)	59	+ 0.725	3
3	6	(Australia) Will Davison	Ford Performance Racing	Ford Falcon (FG)	59	+ 13.952	1
4	888	(Australia) Craig Lowndes	Triple Eight Race Engineering	Holden Commodore (VE)	59	+ 23.258	4
5	14	(New Zealand) Fabian Coulthard	Brad Jones Racing	Holden Commodore (VE)	59	+ 24.353	8
6	4	(Australia) Lee Holdsworth	Stone Brothers Racing	Ford Falcon (FG)	59	+ 26.994	10
7	55	(Australia) David Reynolds	Rod Nash Racing	Ford Falcon (FG)	59	+ 37.430	5
8	3	(Australia) Tony D'Alberto	Tony D'Alberto Racing	Ford Falcon (FG)	59	+ 42.151	6
9	7	(Australia) Todd Kelly	Kelly Racing	Holden Commodore (VE)	59	+ 46.111	15
10	9	(New Zealand) Shane van Gisbergen	Stone Brothers Racing	Ford Falcon (FG)	59	+ 50.725	14
11	47	(Australia) Tim Slade	James Rosenberg Racing	Ford Falcon (FG)	59	+ 51.632	18
12	15	(Australia) Rick Kelly	Kelly Racing	Holden Commodore (VE)	59	+ 53.334	12
13	19	(Australia) Jonathon Webb	Tekno Autosports	Holden Commodore (VE)	59	+ 53.427	16
14	66	(Australia) Russell Ingall	Walkinshaw Racing	Holden Commodore (VE)	59	+ 59.114	21
15	17	(Australia) Steven Johnson	Dick Johnson Racing	Ford Falcon (FG)	59	+ 59.372	13
16	12	(Australia) Dean Fiore	Triple F Racing	Ford Falcon (FG)	59	+ 59.527	22
17	51	(New Zealand) Greg Murphy	Kelly Racing	Holden Commodore (VE)	59	+ 59.699	24
18	18	(Australia) James Moffat	Dick Johnson Racing	Ford Falcon (FG)	59	+ 1:11.162	9
19	30	(Australia) Taz Douglas	Lucas Dumbrell Motorsport	Holden Commodore (VE)	59	+ 1:16.585	25
20	11	(Australia) Karl Reindler	Kelly Racing	Holden Commodore (VE)	59	+ 1:20.757	26
21	8	(Australia) Jason Bright	Brad Jones Racing	Holden Commodore (VE)	59	+ 1:27.209	23
22	22	(Australia) James Courtney	Holden Racing Team	Holden Commodore (VE)	59	+ 1:32.833	17
23	21	(Australia) David Wall	Britek Motorsport	Holden Commodore (VE)	58	+ 1 lap	27
24	33	(France) Alexandre Prémat	Garry Rogers Motorsport	Holden Commodore (VE)	58	+ 1 lap	28
25	34	(Australia) Michael Caruso	Garry Rogers Motorsport	Holden Commodore (VE)	51	+ 8 laps	19
26	2	(Australia) Garth Tander	Holden Racing Team	Holden Commodore (VE)	47	+ 12 laps	7
Ret	91	(Australia) Michael Patrizi	Tekno Autosports	Holden Commodore (VE)	48	Retired	20
Ret	49	(Australia) Steve Owen	Paul Morris Motorsport	Holden Commodore (VE)	13	Retired	11
Fastest lap: Mark Winterbottom (Ford Performance Racing) - 1:22.8736 on lap 11

== Standings ==
- After 6 of 30 races.

Pos	No	Name	Team	Points
1	6	(Australia) Will Davison	Ford Performance Racing	846
2	1	(Australia) Jamie Whincup	Triple Eight Race Engineering	825
3	5	(Australia) Mark Winterbottom	Ford Performance Racing	657
4	888	(Australia) Craig Lowndes	Triple Eight Race Engineering	557
5	4	(Australia) Lee Holdsworth	Stone Brothers Racing	555
