= 2009 V8 Supercar Challenge =

2009 Supercar Championship event

Coordinates: 27°59′23″S 153°25′40″E

(Queensland) 2009 V8 Supercar Challenge
Event Information
- Round 11 of 14 in the 2009 V8 Supercar Championship Series
- Date: 22–25 October 2009
- Location: Surfers Paradise, Queensland
- Venue: Surfers Paradise Street Circuit
- Weather: Fine

Results
Race 1
Distance	34 laps	150 km
Pole position	Mark Winterbottom; Ford Performance Racing	1:50.9325
Winner	Mark Winterbottom; Ford Performance Racing	1:16:43.8908
Race 2
Distance	34 laps	150 km
Pole position	Mark Winterbottom; Ford Performance Racing	
Winner	Garth Tander; Holden Racing Team	1:04:08.7239
Race 3
Distance	34 laps	150 km
Pole position	Jason Bargwanna; Tasman Motorsport	1:49.9887
Winner	Craig Lowndes; Triple Eight Race Engineering	1:13:55.2217
Race 4
Distance	34 laps	150 km
Pole position	Craig Lowndes; Triple Eight Race Engineering	
Winner	Mark Winterbottom; Ford Performance Racing	1:16:02.2312

The 2009 V8 Supercar Challenge (known for naming rights reasons as the 2009 Gold Coast Nikon SuperGP) was the eleventh round of the 2009 V8 Supercar Championship Series. It was the eighth V8 Supercar championship event to be held on the Surfers Paradise Street Circuit and was held on the weekend of 22 to 25 October in Surfers Paradise, Queensland.

Amid the debacle of A1 Grand Prix's collapse, the V8 Supercar series expanded its involvement in the event. Originally scheduled for two 44-lap races, the weekend would see four 34-lap features. Mark Winterbottom claimed pole position for the first race, winning leg one of the first event, but would be usurped later that day when Garth Tander took victory for leg two.

Qualifying for Sunday's event provided a shock result when Jason Bargwanna claimed his first pole position since Calder Park in 1999. Ultimately, the Tasman Motorsport driver was unable to sustain the pass of the front-running teams and Craig Lowndes took the spoils for leg one of the race. Winterbottom fought back in race two to take a gutsy win.

== Background ==
The event was held on the weekend of 22 to 25 October 2009. It was the eighth V8 Supercar event to be held on the Surfers Paradise Street Circuit.

The V8 Supercar Challenge consists of the 19th and 20th races of the season. After the collapse of A1 Grand Prix's involvement in the Nikon SuperGP, V8 Supercar expanded its involvement in the event. The original program planned for a 44 lap, 200 kilometres (120 mi) race to be held on each of Saturday (Race 19) and Sunday (Race 20). The expanded program saw those two races split into a total of four 34 lap, 150 kilometres (93 mi) races, consisting of Races 19a, 19b, 20a and 20b in the 2009 V8 Supercar series. Winner of Race 19 will be decided via points accumulation between races 19a and 19b, with Race 20 calculated in identical manner. Grid positions for Races 19a and 20a to be decided by separate qualifying sessions, with 19b and 20b to be decided by finishing order of the preceding races.

This format changed for the Gold Coast 600 which became a two-driver endurance with two 300 km races one on saturday and one on sunday starting in 2010.

=== Entry list ===
There were 29 drivers entered into this event. 18 drivers would compete in a VE Holden Commodore while ten drivers would utilise the FG Ford Falcon and one, Michael Patrizi of Paul Cruickshank Racing, would remain with the BF Ford Falcon.

=== Support categories ===
Category	Races	Round winner
Australian Formula Ford Championship	3	(Australia) Ashley Walsh (Spectrum 011d)
Australian Mini Challenge	3	(Australia) Paul Stokell (MINI Cooper S JCWR56)
Aussie Racing Cars	4	(Australia) Kyle Clews (Holden Commodore (VY))

== Race report ==
=== Race 19 ===
Races 19a and 19b were held on Saturday October 24.

=== Race 20 ===
Races 20a and 20b were held on Sunday October 25.

==== Race 20a ====
Fabian Coulthard and Cameron McConville wrecked against the wall before the first corner. Coulthard's car was heavily damaged and would take no further part in the weekend. Steven Richards spun Greg Murphy around further back. Richards was subsequently issued a black flag for a driving infringement. Up front Lowndes out-launched the front row pair of Jason Bargwanna and Rick Kelly to jump into the race lead before the Safety car appeared to clean up the mess left by the opening lap.

Rick Kelly caught and passed Bargwanna at the restart. Bargwanna quickly lost further positions as the car misfired on seven cylinder. A quick pitstop to fix a plug lead got Bargwanna back up to pace, but well back in the pack, a cruel result after his first pole position in ten years. Will Davison dropped to the tail of the field with damage to the front right corner of the car after clipping a dislodged tyre bundle at one of the many chicanes. The car pitted and the HRT crew began to replace the damaged right side steering arm.

Michael Patrizi stopped at the top of the course, safety car sent out to control the field once more. The Safety car was sent out the lap after pitstops began, vaulting the few cars who pitted early to the top of track position. At the subsequent restart Shane van Gisbergen overtook Jamie Whincup prior to passing the start/finish line, incurring an instruction from race control to let Whincup past again. Whincup had slowed approaching to line as he prevented himself from overtaking a pitbound Will Davison.

Lowndes settled into a lead over Rick Kelly, although Kelly was later given a black flag as his Commodore was venting fuel from the back of the car. Kelly eventually pitted on lap 20. The following lap Michael Caruso had a major engine failure, dumping fluid over Seek Turn Three. Lee Holdsworth and Greg Murphy spun at the Beach Esses on lap 27.

Lowndes raced on to take a two-second lead over Winterbottom, Garth Tander, Russell Ingall and the Dick Johnson Racing pair of James Courtney leading Steven Johnson. The sting was the second to last lap retirement of Jamie Whincup, bouncing off the walls exiting Falken Tyres Turn at the top of the circuit.

== Race results ==
=== Race 19 ===
==== Qualifying ====
Pos	No	Name	Car	Team	Qual 1	Qual 2
1	5	(Australia) Mark Winterbottom	Ford Performance Racing	Ford Falcon (FG)		1:49.2866
2	2	(Australia) Garth Tander	Holden Racing Team	Holden Commodore (VE)		1:49.7201
3	1	(Australia) Jamie Whincup	Triple Eight Race Engineering	Ford Falcon (FG)		1:49.4796
4	25	(Australia) Jason Bright	Britek Motorsport	Ford Falcon (FG)		1:49.7725
5	22	(Australia) Will Davison	Holden Racing Team	Holden Commodore (VE)		1:49.7273
6	10	(Australia) Paul Dumbrell	Walkinshaw Racing	Holden Commodore (VE)		1:49.7663
7	888	(Australia) Craig Lowndes	Triple Eight Race Engineering	Ford Falcon (FG)		1:49.8324
8	6	(New Zealand) Steven Richards	Ford Performance Racing	Ford Falcon (FG)		1:49.7716
9	18	(Australia) James Courtney	Dick Johnson Racing	Ford Falcon (FG)		1:49.6538
10	39	(Australia) Russell Ingall	Paul Morris Motorsport	Holden Commodore (VE)		1:49.6480
11	33	(Australia) Lee Holdsworth	Garry Rogers Motorsport	Holden Commodore (VE)		1:49.9769
12	51	(New Zealand) Greg Murphy	Tasman Motorsport	Holden Commodore (VE)		1:50.0343
13	8	(New Zealand) Jason Richards	Brad Jones Racing	Holden Commodore (VE)		1:50.1165
14	7	(Australia) Todd Kelly	Kelly Racing	Holden Commodore (VE)		1:50.1569
15	3	(Australia) Jason Bargwanna	Tasman Motorsport	Holden Commodore (VE)		1:50.3311
16	15	(Australia) Rick Kelly	Kelly Racing	Holden Commodore (VE)		1:50.3497
17	111	(New Zealand) Fabian Coulthard	Paul Cruickshank Racing	Ford Falcon (FG)		1:50.3770
18	9	(New Zealand) Shane van Gisbergen	Stone Brothers Racing	Ford Falcon (FG)		1:50.4474
19	17	(Australia) Steven Johnson	Dick Johnson Racing	Ford Falcon (FG)		1:50.4558
20	24	(Australia) David Reynolds	Walkinshaw Racing	Holden Commodore (VE)		1:50.7162
21	14	(Australia) Cameron McConville	Brad Jones Racing	Holden Commodore (VE)	1:50.7488	—N/a
22	11	(Australia) Jack Perkins	Kelly Racing	Holden Commodore (VE)	1:50.7819	—N/a
23	55	(Australia) Tony D'Alberto	Tony D'Alberto Racing	Holden Commodore (VE)	1:50.8088	—N/a
24	4	(Australia) Alex Davison	Stone Brothers Racing	Ford Falcon (FG)	1:50.8323	—N/a
25	34	(Australia) Michael Caruso	Garry Rogers Motorsport	Holden Commodore (VE)	1:51.1242	—N/a
26	67	(Australia) Tim Slade	Paul Morris Motorsport	Holden Commodore (VE)	1:51.2451	—N/a
27	333	(Australia) Michael Patrizi	Paul Cruickshank Racing	Ford Falcon (BF)	1:51.2679	—N/a
28	12	(Australia) Dean Fiore	Triple F Racing	Holden Commodore (VE)	1:51.7650	—N/a
29	16	(Australia) Mark McNally	Kelly Racing	Holden Commodore (VE)	1:53.2264	—N/a

==== Top ten shootout ====
Pos	No	Name	Car	Team	Time
1	5	(Australia) Mark Winterbottom	Ford Performance Racing	Ford Falcon (FG)	1:50.9325
2	2	(Australia) Garth Tander	Holden Racing Team	Holden Commodore (VE)	1:51.2265
3	1	(Australia) Jamie Whincup	Triple Eight Race Engineering	Ford Falcon (FG)	1:51.4058
4	25	(Australia) Jason Bright	Britek Motorsport	Ford Falcon (FG)	1:51.5550
5	22	(Australia) Will Davison	Holden Racing Team	Holden Commodore (VE)	1:51.6711
6	10	(Australia) Paul Dumbrell	Walkinshaw Racing	Holden Commodore (VE)	1:51.7666
7	888	(Australia) Craig Lowndes	Triple Eight Race Engineering	Ford Falcon (FG)	1:51.8405
8	6	(New Zealand) Steven Richards	Ford Performance Racing	Ford Falcon (FG)	1:52.6938
9	18	(Australia) James Courtney	Dick Johnson Racing	Ford Falcon (FG)	4:17.6760
10	39	(Australia) Russell Ingall	Paul Morris Motorsport	Holden Commodore (VE)	no time

==== Leg 1 ====
Pos	No	Name	Team	Vehicle	Laps	Time/retired	Grid	Points
1	5	(Australia) Mark Winterbottom	Ford Performance Racing	Ford Falcon (FG)	34	01:16:43.8908	1	75
2	2	(Australia) Garth Tander	Holden Racing Team	Holden Commodore (VE)	34	+1.3s	2	69
3	22	(Australia) Will Davison	Holden Racing Team	Holden Commodore (VE)	34	+2.4s	5	65
4	888	(Australia) Craig Lowndes	Triple Eight Race Engineering	Ford Falcon (FG)	34	+3.1s	7	60
5	9	(New Zealand) Shane van Gisbergen	Stone Brothers Racing	Ford Falcon (FG)	34	+4.4s	18	56
6	51	(New Zealand) Greg Murphy	Tasman Motorsport	Holden Commodore (VE)	34	+5.3s	12	51
7	6	(New Zealand) Steven Richards	Ford Performance Racing	Ford Falcon (FG)	34	+6.1s	8	48
8	10	(Australia) Paul Dumbrell	Walkinshaw Racing	Holden Commodore (VE)	34	+7.9s	6	45
9	39	(Australia) Russell Ingall	Paul Morris Motorsport	Holden Commodore (VE)	34	+8.1s	10	42
10	17	(Australia) Steven Johnson	Dick Johnson Racing	Ford Falcon (FG)	34	+8.6s	19	39
11	3	(Australia) Jason Bargwanna	Tasman Motorsport	Holden Commodore (VE)	34	+9.4s	15	36
12	15	(Australia) Rick Kelly	Kelly Racing	Holden Commodore (VE)	34	+9.8s	16	35
13	1	(Australia) Jamie Whincup	Triple Eight Race Engineering	Ford Falcon (FG)	34	+11.4s	3	33
14	11	(Australia) Jack Perkins	Kelly Racing	Holden Commodore (VE)	34	+11.6s	22	32
15	24	(Australia) David Reynolds	Walkinshaw Racing	Holden Commodore (VE)	34	+13.1s	20	30
16	4	(Australia) Alex Davison	Stone Brothers Racing	Ford Falcon (FG)	34	+13.6s	24	29
17	67	(Australia) Tim Slade	Paul Morris Motorsport	Holden Commodore (VE)	34	+14.3s	26	27
18	14	(Australia) Cameron McConville	Brad Jones Racing	Holden Commodore (VE)	34	+14.8s	21	26
19	7	(Australia) Todd Kelly	Kelly Racing	Holden Commodore (VE)	34	+15.0s	14	24
20	55	(Australia) Tony D'Alberto	Rod Nash Racing	Holden Commodore (VE)	34	+15.6s	23	23
21	16	(Australia) Mark McNally	Kelly Racing	Holden Commodore (VE)	34	+22.7s	29	21
22	333	(Australia) Michael Patrizi	Paul Cruickshank Racing	Ford Falcon (BF)	32	+ 2 laps	27	20
Ret	18	(Australia) James Courtney	Dick Johnson Racing	Ford Falcon (FG)	31	Accident	9	
Ret	33	(Australia) Lee Holdsworth	Garry Rogers Motorsport	Holden Commodore (VE)	27	Accident	11	
Ret	34	(Australia) Michael Caruso	Garry Rogers Motorsport	Holden Commodore (VE)	27	Accident	25	
Ret	111	(New Zealand) Fabian Coulthard	Paul Cruickshank Racing	Ford Falcon (FG)	14	Retired	17	
Ret	12	(Australia) Dean Fiore	Triple F Racing	Holden Commodore (VE)	13	Accident	28	
Ret	25	(Australia) Jason Bright	Britek Motorsport	Ford Falcon (FG)	5	Retired	4	
Ret	8	(New Zealand) Jason Richards	Brad Jones Racing	Holden Commodore (VE)	0	Accident	13	
Fastest Lap: Mark Winterbottom (Ford Performance Racing) - 1:51.3251 on lap 10

==== Leg 2 ====
Pos	No	Name	Team	Vehicle	Laps	Time/Retired	Grid	Points
1	2	(Australia) Garth Tander	Holden Racing Team	Holden Commodore (VE)	34	1:04:08.7239	2	75
2	5	(Australia) Mark Winterbottom	Ford Performance Racing	Ford Falcon (FG)	34	+2.3s	1	69
3	22	(Australia) Will Davison	Holden Racing Team	Holden Commodore (VE)	34	+3.2s	3	65
4	888	(Australia) Craig Lowndes	Triple Eight Race Engineering	Ford Falcon (FG)	34	+3.5s	4	60
5	51	(New Zealand) Greg Murphy	Tasman Motorsport	Holden Commodore (VE)	34	+10.9s	6	56
6	6	(New Zealand) Steven Richards	Ford Performance Racing	Ford Falcon (FG)	34	+11.4s	7	51
7	9	(New Zealand) Shane van Gisbergen	Stone Brothers Racing	Ford Falcon (FG)	34	+13.6s	5	48
8	1	(Australia) Jamie Whincup	Triple Eight Race Engineering	Ford Falcon (FG)	34	+15.5s	13	45
9	15	(Australia) Rick Kelly	Kelly Racing	Holden Commodore (VE)	34	+16.2s	12	42
10	3	(Australia) Jason Bargwanna	Tasman Motorsport	Holden Commodore (VE)	34	+31.0s	11	39
11	17	(Australia) Steven Johnson	Dick Johnson Racing	Ford Falcon (FG)	34	+31.3s	10	36
12	34	(Australia) Michael Caruso	Garry Rogers Motorsport	Holden Commodore (VE)	27	+31.7s	25	35
13	111	(New Zealand) Fabian Coulthard	Paul Cruickshank Racing	Ford Falcon (FG)	14	+36.2s	26	33
14	33	(Australia) Lee Holdsworth	Garry Rogers Motorsport	Holden Commodore (VE)	27	+44.4s	24	32
15	11	(Australia) Jack Perkins	Kelly Racing	Holden Commodore (VE)	34	+46.1s	14	30
16	18	(Australia) James Courtney	Dick Johnson Racing	Ford Falcon (FG)	31	+49.6s	23	29
17	4	(Australia) Alex Davison	Stone Brothers Racing	Ford Falcon (FG)	34	+52.8s	16	27
18	24	(Australia) David Reynolds	Walkinshaw Racing	Holden Commodore (VE)	34	+53.2s	15	26
19	14	(Australia) Cameron McConville	Brad Jones Racing	Holden Commodore (VE)	34	+53.6s	18	24
20	25	(Australia) Jason Bright	Britek Motorsport	Ford Falcon (FG)	34	+54.7s	28	23
21	67	(Australia) Tim Slade	Paul Morris Motorsport	Holden Commodore (VE)	34	+56.5s	17	21
22	10	(Australia) Paul Dumbrell	Walkinshaw Racing	Holden Commodore (VE)	34	+56.9s	8	20
23	7	(Australia) Todd Kelly	Kelly Racing	Holden Commodore (VE)	34	+63.4s	19	18
24	8	(New Zealand) Jason Richards	Brad Jones Racing	Holden Commodore (VE)	34	+76.2s	29	17
25	55	(Australia) Tony D'Alberto	Rod Nash Racing	Holden Commodore (VE)	34	+97.2s	20	15
26	333	(Australia) Michael Patrizi	Paul Cruickshank Racing	Ford Falcon (BF)	33	+ 1 lap	22	14
27	16	(Australia) Mark McNally	Kelly Racing	Holden Commodore (VE)	33	+ 1 lap	21	12
28	12	(Australia) Dean Fiore	Triple F Racing	Holden Commodore (VE)	32	+ 2 laps	27	11
Ret	39	(Australia) Russell Ingall	Paul Morris Motorsport	Holden Commodore (VE)	11	Retired	9	
Fastest Lap: Jamie Whincup (Triple Eight Race Engineering - 1:50.7233 on lap 13

=== Race 20 ===
==== Qualifying ====
Pos	No	Name	Team	Vehicle	Time
1	3	(Australia) Jason Bargwanna	Tasman Motorsport	Holden Commodore (VE)	1:49.9887
2	888	(Australia) Craig Lowndes	Triple Eight Race Engineering	Ford Falcon (FG)	1:50.0496
3	15	(Australia) Rick Kelly	Kelly Racing	Holden Commodore (VE)	1:50.0895
4	1	(Australia) Jamie Whincup	Triple Eight Race Engineering	Ford Falcon (FG)	1:50.0989
5	22	(Australia) Will Davison	Holden Racing Team	Holden Commodore (VE)	1:50.1172
6	5	(Australia) Mark Winterbottom	Ford Performance Racing	Ford Falcon (FG)	1:50.1410
7	39	(Australia) Russell Ingall	Paul Morris Motorsport	Holden Commodore (VE)	1:50.2410
8	9	(New Zealand) Shane van Gisbergen	Stone Brothers Racing	Ford Falcon (FG)	1:50.3107
9	34	(Australia) Michael Caruso	Garry Rogers Motorsport	Holden Commodore (VE)	1:50.3158
10	51	(New Zealand) Greg Murphy	Tasman Motorsport	Holden Commodore (VE)	1:50.3244
11	10	(Australia) Paul Dumbrell	Walkinshaw Racing	Holden Commodore (VE)	1:50.3664
12	2	(Australia) Garth Tander	Holden Racing Team	Holden Commodore (VE)	1:50.3902
13	18	(Australia) James Courtney	Dick Johnson Racing	Ford Falcon (FG)	1:50.4927
14	6	(New Zealand) Steven Richards	Ford Performance Racing	Ford Falcon (FG)	1:50.6491
15	14	(Australia) Cameron McConville	Brad Jones Racing	Holden Commodore (VE)	1:50.6617
16	24	(Australia) David Reynolds	Walkinshaw Racing	Holden Commodore (VE)	1:50.7091
17	111	(New Zealand) Fabian Coulthard	Paul Cruickshank Racing	Ford Falcon (FG)	1:50.7187
18	33	(Australia) Lee Holdsworth	Garry Rogers Motorsport	Holden Commodore (VE)	1:50.7619
19	17	(Australia) Steven Johnson	Dick Johnson Racing	Ford Falcon (FG)	1:50.7777
20	25	(Australia) Jason Bright	Britek Motorsport	Ford Falcon (FG)	1:50.8041
21	55	(Australia) Tony D'Alberto	Tony D'Alberto Racing	Holden Commodore (VE)	1:50.8562
22	67	(Australia) Tim Slade	Paul Morris Motorsport	Holden Commodore (VE)	1:51.0198
23	8	(New Zealand) Jason Richards	Brad Jones Racing	Holden Commodore (VE)	1:51.0580
24	11	(Australia) Jack Perkins	Kelly Racing	Holden Commodore (VE)	1:51.0955
25	4	(Australia) Alex Davison	Stone Brothers Racing	Ford Falcon (FG)	1:51.3047
26	333	(Australia) Michael Patrizi	Paul Cruickshank Racing	Ford Falcon (BF)	1:51.3635
27	12	(Australia) Dean Fiore	Triple F Racing	Holden Commodore (VE)	1:51.9868
28	7	(Australia) Todd Kelly	Kelly Racing	Holden Commodore (VE)	1:52.1953
29	16	(Australia) Mark McNally	Kelly Racing	Holden Commodore (VE)	1:53.5599

==== Leg 1 ====
Pos	No	Name	Team	Vehicle	Laps	Time/Retired	Grid	Points
1	888	(Australia) Craig Lowndes	Triple Eight Race Engineering	Ford Falcon (FG)	34	1:13:55.2217	2	75
2	5	(Australia) Mark Winterbottom	Ford Performance Racing	Ford Falcon (FG)	34	+2.2s	6	69
3	2	(Australia) Garth Tander	Holden Racing Team	Holden Commodore (VE)	34	+3.6s	12	65
4	39	(Australia) Russell Ingall	Paul Morris Motorsport	Holden Commodore (VE)	34	+6.2s	7	60
5	18	(Australia) James Courtney	Dick Johnson Racing	Ford Falcon (FG)	34	+11.4s	13	56
6	17	(Australia) Steven Johnson	Dick Johnson Racing	Ford Falcon (FG)	34	+15.8s	19	51
7	24	(Australia) David Reynolds	Walkinshaw Racing	Holden Commodore (VE)	34	+17.7s	16	48
8	25	(Australia) Jason Bright	Britek Motorsport	Ford Falcon (FG)	34	+20.9s	20	45
9	3	(Australia) Jason Bargwanna	Tasman Motorsport	Holden Commodore (VE)	34	+24.4s	1	42
10	8	(New Zealand) Jason Richards	Brad Jones Racing	Holden Commodore (VE)	34	+25.3s	23	39
11	10	(Australia) Paul Dumbrell	Walkinshaw Racing	Holden Commodore (VE)	34	+26.1s	8	36
12	6	(New Zealand) Steven Richards	Ford Performance Racing	Ford Falcon (FG)	34	+26.5s	14	35
13	55	(Australia) Tony D'Alberto	Tony D'Alberto Racing	Holden Commodore (VE)	34	+27.0s	21	33
14	51	(New Zealand) Greg Murphy	Tasman Motorsport	Holden Commodore (VE)	34	+27.5s	10	32
15	12	(Australia) Dean Fiore	Triple F Racing	Holden Commodore (VE)	34	+35.5s	27	30
16	4	(Australia) Alex Davison	Stone Brothers Racing	Ford Falcon (FG)	34	+35.9s	25	29
17	67	(Australia) Tim Slade	Paul Morris Motorsport	Holden Commodore (VE)	34	+40.7s	22	27
18	7	(Australia) Todd Kelly	Kelly Racing	Holden Commodore (VE)	34	+41.1s	28	26
19	9	(New Zealand) Shane van Gisbergen	Stone Brothers Racing	Ford Falcon (FG)	33	+ 1 lap	8	24
20	15	(Australia) Rick Kelly	Kelly Racing	Holden Commodore (VE)	33	+ 1 lap	3	23
21	22	(Australia) Will Davison	Holden Racing Team	Holden Commodore (VE)	31	+ 3 laps	5	21
22	33	(Australia) Lee Holdsworth	Garry Rogers Motorsport	Holden Commodore (VE)	29	+ 5 laps	18	20
Ret	1	(Australia) Jamie Whincup	Triple Eight Race Engineering	Ford Falcon (FG)	32	Accident	4	
Ret	34	(Australia) Michael Caruso	Garry Rogers Motorsport	Holden Commodore (VE)	19	Accident	9	
Ret	16	(Australia) Mark McNally	Kelly Racing	Holden Commodore (VE)	13	Accident	29	
Ret	333	(Australia) Michael Patrizi	Paul Cruickshank Racing	Ford Falcon (BF)	8	Accident	26	
Ret	11	(Australia) Jack Perkins	Kelly Racing	Holden Commodore (VE)	8	Accident	24	
Ret	14	(Australia) Cameron McConville	Brad Jones Racing	Holden Commodore (VE)	0	Accident	15	
Ret	111	(New Zealand) Fabian Coulthard	Paul Cruickshank Racing	Ford Falcon (FG)	0	Retired	17	
Fastest Lap

==== Leg 2 ====
Pos	No	Name	Team	Vehicle	Laps	Time/Retired	Grid	Points
1	5	(Australia) Mark Winterbottom	Ford Performance Racing	Ford Falcon (FG)	34	01:16:02.2312	2	75
2	2	(Australia) Garth Tander	Holden Racing Team	Holden Commodore (VE)	34	+2.6s	3	69
3	18	(Australia) James Courtney	Dick Johnson Racing	Ford Falcon (FG)	34	+5.9s	5	65
4	25	(Australia) Jason Bright	Britek Motorsport	Ford Falcon (FG)	34	+9.6s	8	60
5	17	(Australia) Steven Johnson	Dick Johnson Racing	Ford Falcon (FG)	34	+9.8s	6	56
6	1	(Australia) Jamie Whincup	Triple Eight Race Engineering	Ford Falcon (FG)	34	+10.2s	23	51
7	51	(New Zealand) Greg Murphy	Tasman Motorsport	Holden Commodore (VE)	34	+11.3s	14	48
8	8	(New Zealand) Jason Richards	Brad Jones Racing	Holden Commodore (VE)	34	+12.6s	10	45
9	15	(Australia) Rick Kelly	Kelly Racing	Holden Commodore (VE)	34	+12.9s	20	42
10	22	(Australia) Will Davison	Holden Racing Team	Holden Commodore (VE)	34	+14.1s	21	39
11	9	(New Zealand) Shane van Gisbergen	Stone Brothers Racing	Ford Falcon (FG)	34	+15.4s	19	36
12	33	(Australia) Lee Holdsworth	Garry Rogers Motorsport	Holden Commodore (VE)	34	+15.8s	22	35
13	888	(Australia) Craig Lowndes	Triple Eight Race Engineering	Ford Falcon (FG)	34	+22.6s	1	33
14	34	(Australia) Michael Caruso	Garry Rogers Motorsport	Holden Commodore (VE)	34	+25.4s	24	32
15	7	(Australia) Todd Kelly	Kelly Racing	Holden Commodore (VE)	34	+26.4s	18	30
16	55	(Australia) Tony D'Alberto	Tony D'Alberto Racing	Holden Commodore (VE)	34	+28.7s	13	29
17	4	(Australia) Alex Davison	Stone Brothers Racing	Ford Falcon (FG)	34	+31.0s	16	27
18	11	(Australia) Jack Perkins	Kelly Racing	Holden Commodore (VE)	34	+31.3s	27	26
19	12	(Australia) Dean Fiore	Triple F Racing	Holden Commodore (VE)	34	+39.9s	15	24
20	10	(Australia) Paul Dumbrell	Walkinshaw Racing	Holden Commodore (VE)	34	+40.1s	11	23
21	67	(Australia) Tim Slade	Paul Morris Motorsport	Holden Commodore (VE)	34	+41.2s	17	21
22	16	(Australia) Mark McNally	Kelly Racing	Holden Commodore (VE)	34	+59.5s	25	20
Ret	3	(Australia) Jason Bargwanna	Tasman Motorsport	Holden Commodore (VE)	16	Accident	9	
Ret	6	(New Zealand) Steven Richards	Ford Performance Racing	Ford Falcon (FG)	16	Accident	12	
Ret	24	(Australia) David Reynolds	Walkinshaw Racing	Holden Commodore (VE)	13	Accident	7	
Ret	39	(Australia) Russell Ingall	Paul Morris Motorsport	Holden Commodore (VE)	7	Accident	4	
Ret	333	(Australia) Michael Patrizi	Paul Cruickshank Racing	Ford Falcon (BF)	0	Retired	26	
DNS	14	(Australia) Cameron McConville	Brad Jones Racing	Holden Commodore (VE)		Did not start		
DNS	111	(New Zealand) Fabian Coulthard	Paul Cruickshank Racing	Ford Falcon (FG)		Did not start		
Fastest Lap

== Standings ==
- After Race 20 of 26

Pos	No	Name	Team	Points
1	1	Jamie Whincup	Triple Eight Race Engineering	2604
2	22	Will Davison	Holden Racing Team	2572
3	2	Garth Tander	Holden Racing Team	2315
4	888	Craig Lowndes	Triple Eight Race Engineering	2174
5	5	Mark Winterbottom	Ford Performance Racing	1862
