= 2011 Hamilton 400 =

Motor race

(New Zealand) 2011 ITM Hamilton 400
Event Information
- Round 3 of 14 in the 2011 International V8 Supercars Championship
- Date: 15–17 April 2011
- Location: Hamilton, New Zealand
- Venue: Hamilton Street Circuit
- Weather: Rain, fine during second race

Results
Race 1
Distance	59 laps	200 km
Pole position	Jamie Whincup; Triple Eight Race Engineering	1:34.5918
Winner	Rick Kelly; Kelly Racing	1:38:27.0660
Race 2
Distance	59 laps	200 km
Pole position	Rick Kelly; Kelly Racing	1:27.2478
Winner	Shane van Gisbergen; Stone Brothers Racing	1:34:19.8748

The 2011 Hamilton 400 (known for naming rights reasons as the 2011 ITM Hamilton 400) was the third round of the 2011 International V8 Supercars Championship. It was the fourth V8 Supercar event to be held on the Hamilton Street Circuit and was held on the weekend of 15 to 17 April in Hamilton, New Zealand.

== Background ==
=== Support categories ===
Category	Races	Round winner
New Zealand V8s	3	(New Zealand) John McIntyre (Ford Falcon (BF))
NZ V8 Ute Racing Series	3	(New Zealand) Chris Pither (Ford Falcon (BF) Ute)
GT1 NZ	3	(New Zealand) Dwayne Carter (Ford Falcon (BA))
Muscle Touring Cars	3	(New Zealand) Logan Childs (Mitsubishi Lancer Evolution)

== Race report ==
The event hosted races 5 and 6 of the 2011 season. 2006 V8 Supercar champion Rick Kelly won the Saturday race from third on the grid in a mixture of wet and dry weather conditions. Paul Dumbrell did not participate in the race after a heavy crash at turn 3 in qualifying. Polesitter Jamie Whincup was caught out by the damp conditions, hitting the wall while exiting the pits and damaging the steering on his car. There were many incidents in the pit lane with cars failing to stop on the slippery concrete surface, running into pit crews and cameramen. Whincup's teammate Craig Lowndes finished second while Todd Kelly made it a double podium for Kelly Racing.

The Kelly brothers maintained their form through to Sunday's race, with Rick taking pole and Todd starting next to him on the front row after a rain affected qualifying session which saw only one flying lap for most of the drivers. Shane van Gisbergen won the first race of his career, holding off Lee Holdsworth in the closing stages of the race. Garth Tander finished on the podium after starting the race in 19th. Steve Owen recovered from a disastrous weekend in Adelaide by finishing in the top five. Whincup had another disappointing race and left the weekend with his championship lead almost halved, 81 points ahead of Rick Kelly.

== Results ==
Results as follows:

=== Qualifying Race 5 ===
Pos	No	Name	Team	Vehicle	Qualifying	Shootout
1	88	(Australia) Jamie Whincup	Triple Eight Race Engineering	Holden Commodore (VE)	1:36.5077	1:34.5918
2	17	(Australia) Steven Johnson	Dick Johnson Racing	Ford Falcon (FG)	1:35.8538	1:34.7234
3	15	(Australia) Rick Kelly	Kelly Racing	Holden Commodore (VE)	1:35.9807	1:35.1252
4	9	(New Zealand) Shane van Gisbergen	Stone Brothers Racing	Ford Falcon (FG)	1:36.0896	1:35.2582
5	888	(Australia) Craig Lowndes	Triple Eight Race Engineering	Holden Commodore (VE)	1:36.3580	1:35.5132
6	2	(Australia) Garth Tander	Holden Racing Team	Holden Commodore (VE)	1:36.9763	1:35.8709
7	16	(Australia) David Reynolds	Kelly Racing	Holden Commodore (VE)	1:36.7770	1:36.6778
8	11	(New Zealand) Greg Murphy	Kelly Racing	Holden Commodore (VE)	1:36.8028	1:38.3523
9	3	(Australia) Tony D'Alberto	Tony D'Alberto Racing	Ford Falcon (FG)	1:36.8435	1:43.7645
10	12	(Australia) Dean Fiore	Triple F Racing	Ford Falcon (FG)	1:36.8624	no time
11	5	(Australia) Mark Winterbottom	Ford Performance Racing	Ford Falcon (FG)	1:37.0891	
12	18	(Australia) James Moffat	Dick Johnson Racing	Ford Falcon (FG)	1:37.1194	
13	6	(Australia) Will Davison	Ford Performance Racing	Ford Falcon (FG)	1:37.2843	
14	19	(Australia) Jonathon Webb	Tekno Autosports	Ford Falcon (FG)	1:37.4044	
15	61	(New Zealand) Fabian Coulthard	Walkinshaw Racing	Holden Commodore (VE)	1:37.6021	
16	39	(Australia) Russell Ingall	Paul Morris Motorsport	Holden Commodore (VE)	1:37.7559	
17	30	(Australia) Warren Luff	Lucas Dumbrell Motorsport	Holden Commodore (VE)	1:37.7904	
18	55	(Australia) Paul Dumbrell	Rod Nash Racing	Ford Falcon (FG)	1:37.8300	
19	7	(Australia) Todd Kelly	Kelly Racing	Holden Commodore (VE)	1:37.8479	
20	8	(Australia) Jason Bright	Brad Jones Racing	Holden Commodore (VE)	1:38.1719	
21	49	(Australia) Steve Owen	Paul Morris Motorsport	Holden Commodore (VE)	1:38.2784	
22	1	(Australia) James Courtney	Holden Racing Team	Holden Commodore (VE)	1:38.9804	
23	21	(Australia) Karl Reindler	Britek Motorsport	Holden Commodore (VE)	1:39.0865	
24	34	(Australia) Michael Caruso	Garry Rogers Motorsport	Holden Commodore (VE)	1:39.3077	
25	14	(Australia) Jason Bargwanna	Brad Jones Racing	Holden Commodore (VE)	1:39.6767	
26	47	(Australia) Tim Slade	James Rosenberg Racing	Ford Falcon (FG)	1:40.1066	
27	33	(Australia) Lee Holdsworth	Garry Rogers Motorsport	Holden Commodore (VE)	1:40.2031	
28	4	(Australia) Alex Davison	Stone Brothers Racing	Ford Falcon (FG)	1:42.9963	

=== Race 5 ===
Pos	No	Name	Team	Vehicle	Laps	Time/Retired	Grid	Points
1	15	(Australia) Rick Kelly	Kelly Racing	Holden Commodore (VE)	59	1:38:27.0660	3	150
2	888	(Australia) Craig Lowndes	Triple Eight Race Engineering	Holden Commodore (VE)	59	+ 1.313	5	138
3	7	(Australia) Todd Kelly	Kelly Racing	Holden Commodore (VE)	59	+ 7.925	19	129
4	5	(Australia) Mark Winterbottom	Ford Performance Racing	Ford Falcon (FG)	59	+ 8.472	11	120
5	17	(Australia) Steven Johnson	Dick Johnson Racing	Ford Falcon (FG)	59	+ 15.438	2	111
6	6	(Australia) Will Davison	Ford Performance Racing	Ford Falcon (FG)	59	+ 17.229	13	102
7	61	(New Zealand) Fabian Coulthard	Walkinshaw Racing	Holden Commodore (VE)	59	+ 18.458	15	96
8	11	(New Zealand) Greg Murphy	Kelly Racing	Holden Commodore (VE)	59	+ 19.200	8	90
9	18	(Australia) James Moffat	Dick Johnson Racing	Ford Falcon (FG)	59	+ 20.937	12	84
10	4	(Australia) Alex Davison	Stone Brothers Racing	Ford Falcon (FG)	59	+ 23.568	28	78
11	1	(Australia) James Courtney	Holden Racing Team	Holden Commodore (VE)	59	+ 24.011	22	72
12	3	(Australia) Tony D'Alberto	Tony D'Alberto Racing	Ford Falcon (FG)	59	+ 32.037	9	69
13	14	(Australia) Jason Bargwanna	Brad Jones Racing	Holden Commodore (VE)	59	+ 1:26.477	25	66
14	39	(Australia) Russell Ingall	Paul Morris Motorsport	Holden Commodore (VE)	58	+ 1 lap	16	63
15	34	(Australia) Michael Caruso	Garry Rogers Motorsport	Holden Commodore (VE)	58	+ 1 lap	24	60
16	9	(New Zealand) Shane van Gisbergen	Stone Brothers Racing	Ford Falcon (FG)	58	+ 1 lap	4	57
17	21	(Australia) Karl Reindler	Britek Motorsport	Holden Commodore (VE)	58	+ 1 lap	23	54
18	2	(Australia) Garth Tander	Holden Racing Team	Holden Commodore (VE)	58	+ 1 lap	6	51
19	8	(Australia) Jason Bright	Brad Jones Racing	Holden Commodore (VE)	58	+ 1 lap	20	48
20	49	(Australia) Steve Owen	Paul Morris Motorsport	Holden Commodore (VE)	58	+ 1 lap	21	45
21	12	(Australia) Dean Fiore	Triple F Racing	Ford Falcon (FG)	57	+ 2 laps	10	42
22	33	(Australia) Lee Holdsworth	Garry Rogers Motorsport	Holden Commodore (VE)	57	+ 2 laps	27	39
23	88	(Australia) Jamie Whincup	Triple Eight Race Engineering	Holden Commodore (VE)	56	+ 3 laps	1	36
24	16	(Australia) David Reynolds	Kelly Racing	Holden Commodore (VE)	52	+ 7 laps	7	33
Ret	47	(Australia) Tim Slade	James Rosenberg Racing	Ford Falcon (FG)	26	Retired	26	
Ret	19	(Australia) Jonathon Webb	Tekno Autosports	Ford Falcon (FG)	22	Retired	14	
Ret	30	(Australia) Warren Luff	Lucas Dumbrell Motorsport	Holden Commodore (VE)	14	Retired	17	
DNS	55	(Australia) Paul Dumbrell	Rod Nash Racing	Ford Falcon (FG)		Did not start		
Fastest Lap: Michael Caruso (Garry Rogers Motorsport) - 1:23.8002 on lap 10

=== Qualifying Race 6 ===
Pos	No	Name	Team	Vehicle	Time
1	15	(Australia) Rick Kelly	Kelly Racing	Holden Commodore (VE)	1:27.2478
2	7	(Australia) Todd Kelly	Kelly Racing	Holden Commodore (VE)	1:28.0046
3	49	(Australia) Steve Owen	Paul Morris Motorsport	Holden Commodore (VE)	1:28.0916
4	9	(New Zealand) Shane van Gisbergen	Stone Brothers Racing	Ford Falcon (FG)	1:28.4715
5	11	(New Zealand) Greg Murphy	Kelly Racing	Holden Commodore (VE)	1:28.5455
6	33	(Australia) Lee Holdsworth	Garry Rogers Motorsport	Holden Commodore (VE)	1:28.8222
7	4	(Australia) Alex Davison	Stone Brothers Racing	Ford Falcon (FG)	1:28.9578
8	888	(Australia) Craig Lowndes	Triple Eight Race Engineering	Holden Commodore (VE)	1:29.0245
9	88	(Australia) Jamie Whincup	Triple Eight Race Engineering	Holden Commodore (VE)	1:29.0687
10	6	(Australia) Will Davison	Ford Performance Racing	Ford Falcon (FG)	1:29.0743
11	55	(Australia) Paul Dumbrell	Rod Nash Racing	Ford Falcon (FG)	1:29.1136
12	3	(Australia) Tony D'Alberto	Tony D'Alberto Racing	Ford Falcon (FG)	1:29.1907
13	1	(Australia) James Courtney	Holden Racing Team	Holden Commodore (VE)	1:29.3608
14	17	(Australia) Steven Johnson	Dick Johnson Racing	Ford Falcon (FG)	1:29.5871
15	47	(Australia) Tim Slade	James Rosenberg Racing	Ford Falcon (FG)	1:29.6404
16	34	(Australia) Michael Caruso	Garry Rogers Motorsport	Holden Commodore (VE)	1:30.0683
17	39	(Australia) Russell Ingall	Paul Morris Motorsport	Holden Commodore (VE)	1:30.3558
18	12	(Australia) Dean Fiore	Triple F Racing	Ford Falcon (FG)	1:30.7846
19	2	(Australia) Garth Tander	Holden Racing Team	Holden Commodore (VE)	1:30.9415
20	14	(Australia) Jason Bargwanna	Brad Jones Racing	Holden Commodore (VE)	1:31.2452
21	5	(Australia) Mark Winterbottom	Ford Performance Racing	Ford Falcon (FG)	1:31.3223
22	30	(Australia) Warren Luff	Lucas Dumbrell Motorsport	Holden Commodore (VE)	1:31.7511
23	21	(Australia) Karl Reindler	Britek Motorsport	Holden Commodore (VE)	1:31.9130
24	8	(Australia) Jason Bright	Brad Jones Racing	Holden Commodore (VE)	1:32.1825
25	61	(New Zealand) Fabian Coulthard	Walkinshaw Racing	Holden Commodore (VE)	1:32.2492
26	16	(Australia) David Reynolds	Kelly Racing	Holden Commodore (VE)	1:33.7265
27	19	(Australia) Jonathon Webb	Tekno Autosports	Ford Falcon (FG)	1:34.1673
28	18	(Australia) James Moffat	Dick Johnson Racing	Ford Falcon (FG)	1:34.4939

=== Race 6 ===
Pos	No	Name	Team	Vehicle	Laps	Time/Retired	Grid	Points
1	9	(New Zealand) Shane van Gisbergen	Stone Brothers Racing	Ford Falcon (FG)	59	1:34:19.8748	4	150
2	33	(Australia) Lee Holdsworth	Garry Rogers Motorsport	Holden Commodore (VE)	59	+ 0.783	6	138
3	2	(Australia) Garth Tander	Holden Racing Team	Holden Commodore (VE)	59	+ 6.212	19	129
4	6	(Australia) Will Davison	Ford Performance Racing	Ford Falcon (FG)	59	+ 8.379	10	120
5	49	(Australia) Steve Owen	Paul Morris Motorsport	Holden Commodore (VE)	59	+ 12.527	3	111
6	15	(Australia) Rick Kelly	Kelly Racing	Holden Commodore (VE)	59	+ 15.286	1	102
7	4	(Australia) Alex Davison	Stone Brothers Racing	Ford Falcon (FG)	59	+ 15.407	7	96
8	39	(Australia) Russell Ingall	Paul Morris Motorsport	Holden Commodore (VE)	59	+ 15.990	17	90
9	17	(Australia) Steven Johnson	Dick Johnson Racing	Ford Falcon (FG)	59	+ 16.743	14	84
10	888	(Australia) Craig Lowndes	Triple Eight Race Engineering	Holden Commodore (VE)	59	+ 18.627	8	78
11	8	(Australia) Jason Bright	Brad Jones Racing	Holden Commodore (VE)	59	+ 20.053	24	72
12	19	(Australia) Jonathon Webb	Tekno Autosports	Ford Falcon (FG)	59	+ 20.984	27	69
13	21	(Australia) Karl Reindler	Britek Motorsport	Holden Commodore (VE)	59	+ 23.720	23	66
14	12	(Australia) Dean Fiore	Triple F Racing	Ford Falcon (FG)	59	+ 24.077	18	63
15	7	(Australia) Todd Kelly	Kelly Racing	Holden Commodore (VE)	59	+ 28.048	2	60
16	30	(Australia) Warren Luff	Lucas Dumbrell Motorsport	Holden Commodore (VE)	59	+ 33.976	22	57
17	18	(Australia) James Moffat	Dick Johnson Racing	Ford Falcon (FG)	59	+ 1:00.963	28	54
18	88	(Australia) Jamie Whincup	Triple Eight Race Engineering	Holden Commodore (VE)	57	+ 2 laps	9	51
19	55	(Australia) Paul Dumbrell	Rod Nash Racing	Ford Falcon (FG)	56	+ 3 laps	11	48
20	16	(Australia) David Reynolds	Kelly Racing	Holden Commodore (VE)	48	+ 11 laps	26	45
Ret	47	(Australia) Tim Slade	James Rosenberg Racing	Ford Falcon (FG)	55	Retired	15	
Ret	61	(New Zealand) Fabian Coulthard	Walkinshaw Racing	Holden Commodore (VE)	55	Retired	25	
Ret	3	(Australia) Tony D'Alberto	Tony D'Alberto Racing	Ford Falcon (FG)	46	Retired	12	
Ret	34	(Australia) Michael Caruso	Garry Rogers Motorsport	Holden Commodore (VE)	43	Retired	16	
Ret	14	(Australia) Jason Bargwanna	Brad Jones Racing	Holden Commodore (VE)	20	Retired	20	
Ret	5	(Australia) Mark Winterbottom	Ford Performance Racing	Ford Falcon (FG)	19	Retired	21	
Ret	11	(New Zealand) Greg Murphy	Kelly Racing	Holden Commodore (VE)	9	Retired	5	
Ret	1	(Australia) James Courtney	Holden Racing Team	Holden Commodore (VE)	3	Retired	13	
Fastest Lap: Jamie Whincup (Triple Eight Race Engineering) - 1:22.8973 on lap 39

== Standings ==
- After 6 of 28 races.

Pos	No	Name	Team	Points
1	88	(Australia) Jamie Whincup	Triple Eight Race Engineering	654
2	15	(Australia) Rick Kelly	Kelly Racing	573
3	888	(Australia) Craig Lowndes	Triple Eight Race Engineering	552
4	2	(Australia) Garth Tander	Holden Racing Team	543
5	5	(Australia) Mark Winterbottom	Ford Performance Racing	543
