= Tony D'Alberto =

Australian racing driver

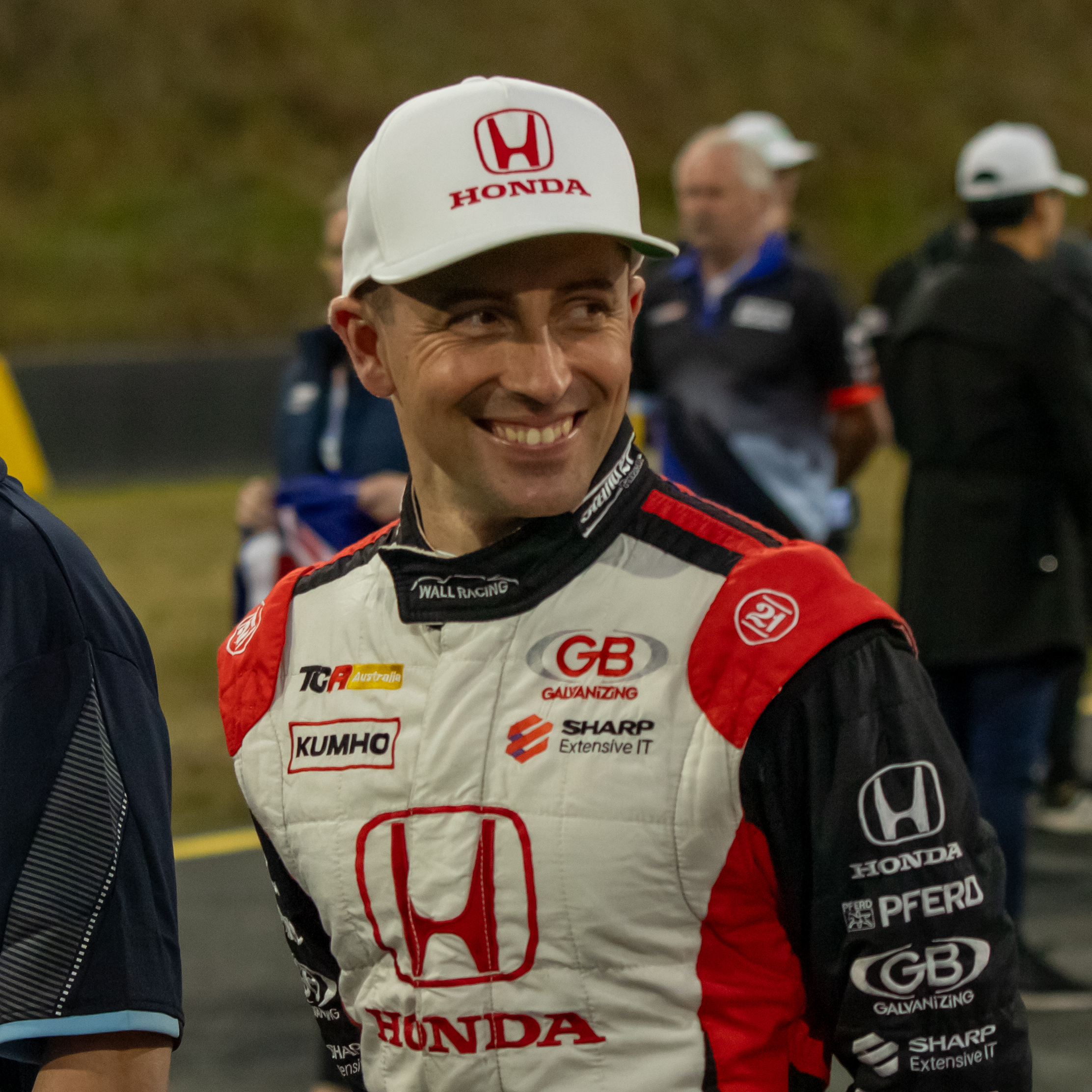
- D'Alberto in 2023
- Nationality: Australian
- Born: Antonio Alvano D'Alberto; 9 December 1985 (age 40) Melbourne, Victoria, Australia
- Categorisation: FIA Silver

Supercars Championship career
- Current team: Dick Johnson Racing (Endurance race co-driver)
- Championships: 0
- Races: 200
- Wins: 0
- Podiums: 3
- Pole positions: 0
- 2013 position: 16th (1526 pts)

Antonio Alvano "Tony" D'Alberto (born 9 December 1985) is an Australian professional racing driver. He currently drives the No.38 Ford Mustang GT for Dick Johnson Racing as a co-driver in the Supercars Championship.

== Racing career ==
=== Formula Ford ===
D'Alberto began his career in the early 2000s running a Formula Ford in his home state of Victoria, making a brief appearance in the 2002 Australian Formula Ford Championship.

=== V8 Supercar Development Series ===
2003 saw D'Alberto venture into V8Supercars for the first time, stepping into a John Faulkner Racing Commodore at the third round of the second tier Konica V8 Supercar Series held at Eastern Creek Raceway. In just his sixth race, he had climbed into the top ten at Phillip Island and finished his first partial season with a fifth place overall at the series final at Mallala Motor Sport Park.

Joining the Independent Racing Cars team for 2004 D'Alberto evolved into a regular top-ten runner, but podiums eluded him as he raced to eighth place in the championship. That first podium came, though, on the biggest stage at the non-championship round held as a support race for the 2004 Bathurst 1000, driving a Ford Falcon for the first and thus far only time he gave his temporary Howard Racing team a third-place finish.

Tony D'Alberto Racing was formed around the developing racer and a serious attempt for the champion was run for the first time in the 2005 season and he claimed third places at the Adelaide Street Circuit, Eastern Creek and Bathurst rounds of the championship on his way to fifth place. His form, however, did translate to his first invite to race in the main series endurance races and he stepped into the second Tasman Motorsport Commodore but did not finish either enduro.

2006 was frustrating for D'Alberto as the team expanded to a second car for Mark McNally but slid backwards and apart from again starring at the Bathurst round, heading for the familiar third place, was absent from the Fujitsu Series podiums, although the enduros this year saw him join the championship winning team HSV Dealer Team although a confused driver swapping situation with Holden Racing Team saw D'Alberto deposited into the combined squads fourth car and results were not strong.

==== Series champion ====
2007 would see a season long battle between a revitalised Tony D'Alberto Racing team and the big new team in the Fujitsu series, the Jim Morton run Ford team, Ford Rising Stars Racing and its lead driver Michael Caruso. Second at the Adelaide Clipsal 500 round lead to his first race win at Wakefield Park Raceway in the third race of the weekend, which also gave him his first round win, and the points lead as Caruso faltered. Consistent seconds and a third at Winton gave D'Alberto another round win, but Queensland Raceway was a miss-step and Caruso gained ground. Owen Kelly took over the Oran Park Raceway round as D'Alberto slid to sixth for the round but it was worse for Caruso. Bathurst, too, was a mixed result, but Caruso gained ground as Luke Youlden took the win. At the Phillip Island finale Caruso reigned supreme but a late race collision with Dale Wood saw D'Alberto limp to the line for the first race in ninth place. A repaired Commodore raced home to fifth position, more than enough to secure the crown despite Caruso's race win.

In the 2007 enduro season might have looked modest as D'Alberto joined the smallest team in the series, the Independent Race Cars run Rod Nash Racing Commodore driven by Steve Owen. Eleventh place had been a good result at the 2007 Sandown 500 but the team starred at Bathurst. Despite the team's relative lack of resources, they were involved in the fight at the fringe of the lead pack in the desperate, rain-affected final stage of the race and Owen brought the car home in a superb sixth position.

=== Supercars Championship ===
Tony D'Alberto Racing ran under the Rod Nash Racing franchise for the team's first assault on the V8 Supercar Championship Series in 2008, fulfilling the team's long held ambitions. While a long running court case over past ownership of the No. 55 franchise threw some doubt over the team's entry in that series, it was able to compete in all events in the 2008 championship.

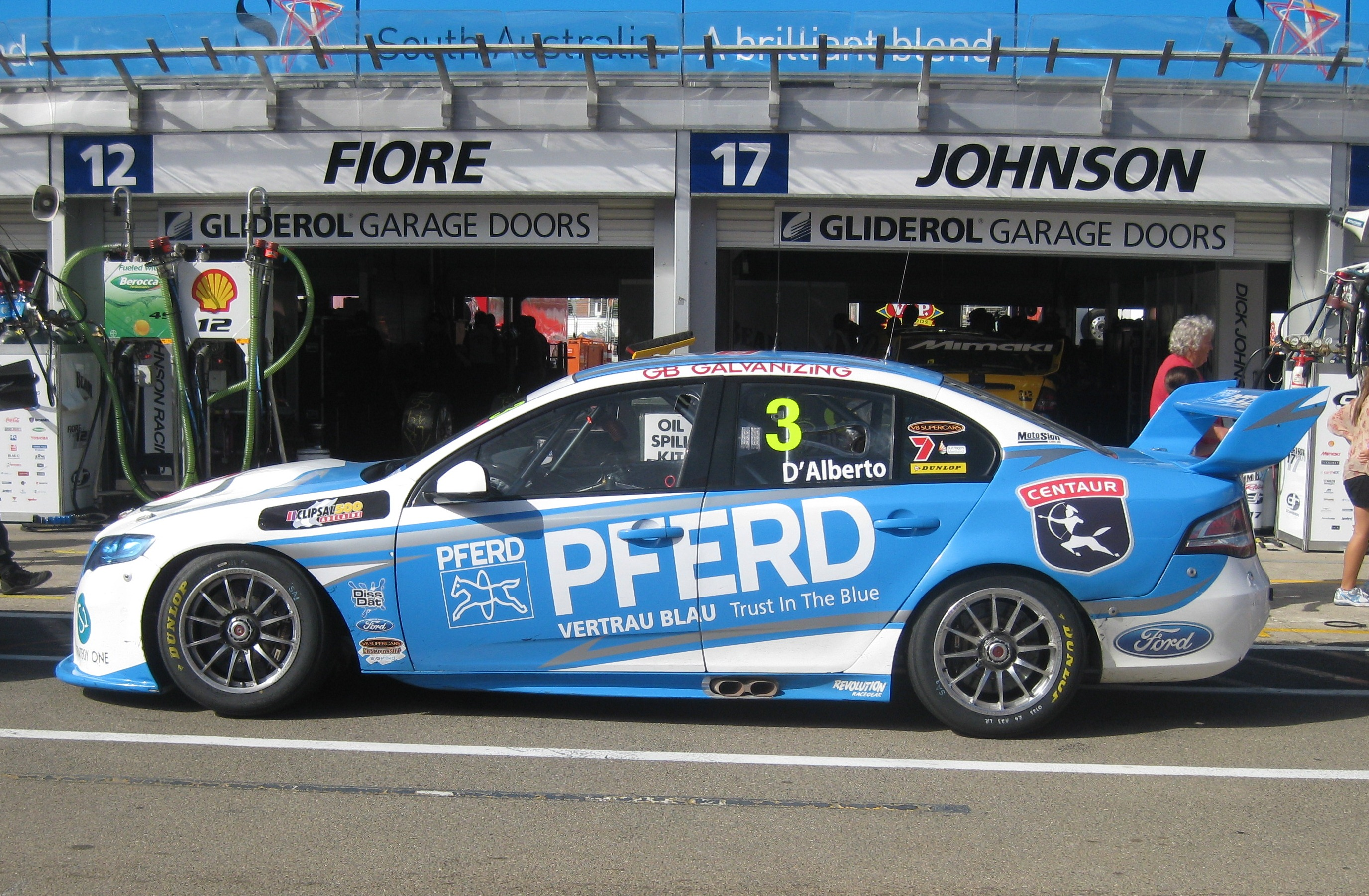
D'Alberto's Ford FG Falcon at the 2012 Clipsal 500 Adelaide

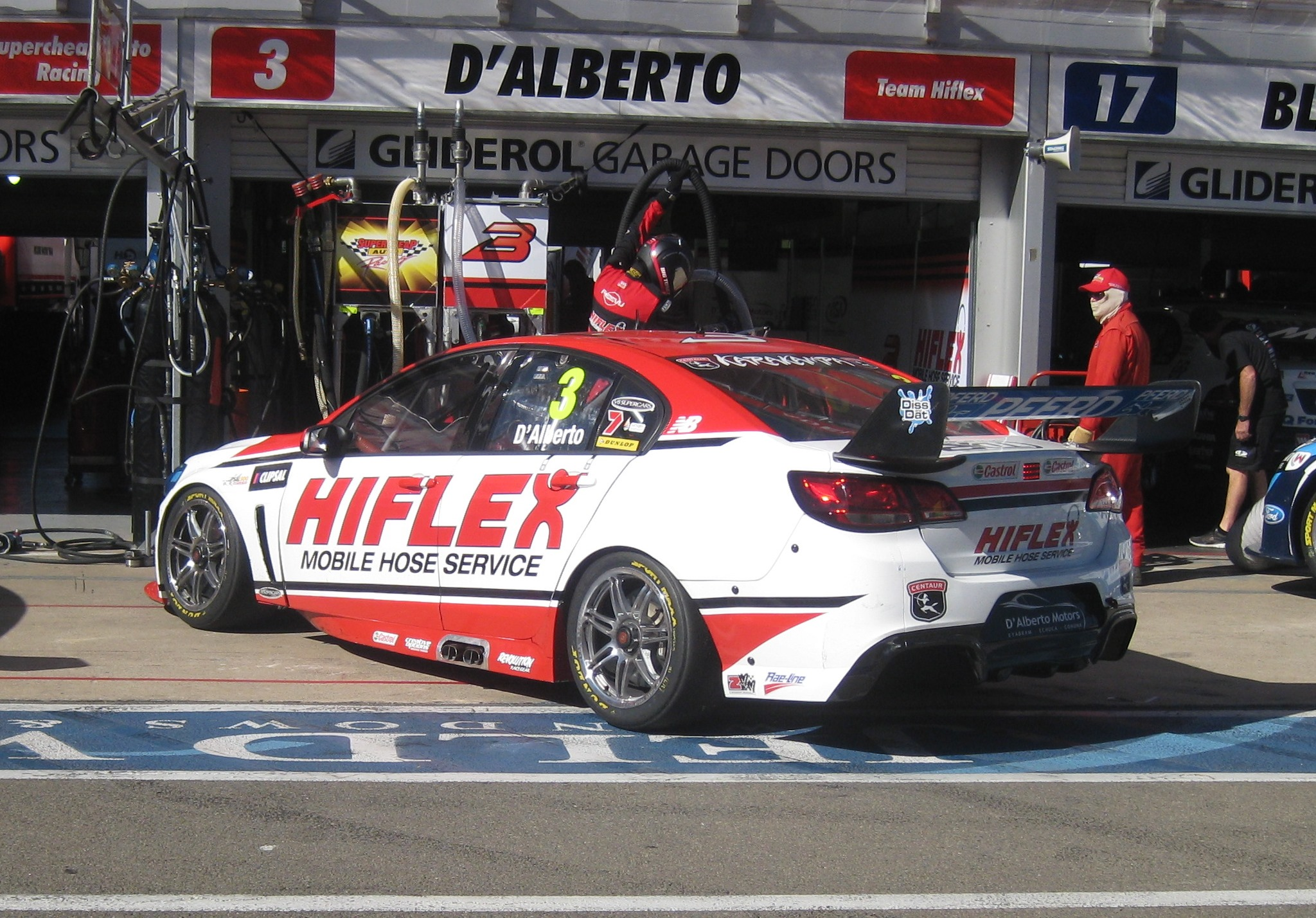
D'Alberto's Holden VF Commodore at the 2013 Clipsal 500 Adelaide

In 2013, under the new Car of the Future rules, D'Alberto drove the Walkinshaw Racing-backed No. 3 VF Commodore under the standalone team of Tony D'Alberto Racing. Although his success was limited, with his best race results being a fourth at Winton, and a fourth at Surfers Paradise (with co-driver Jonny Reid), D'Alberto finished the Championship season in 16th place, his best result yet.

In 2014, due to insufficient sponsorship and funding, Tony D'Alberto Racing sold their car and equipment to Walkinshaw Racing, leaving D'Alberto without a full-time drive. D'Alberto would drive with Walkinshaw Racing's Tim Slade, as co-driver of the No. 47 VF Commodore in the enduro races in 2014.

In 2016, D'Alberto would join Scott Pye in No. 17 as co-driver at DJR Penske FG X Falcon for the enduro series (Sandown, Bathurst and Gold Coast) of the V8 Supercar Championship.

== Racing record ==
=== Karting career summary ===
| Season | Series | Position |
|---|---|---|
| 1997 | J.C. Maddox Karting Trophy | **1st** |

=== Racing career summary ===
| Season | Series | Position | Car | Team |
|---|---|---|---|---|
| 2002 | Victorian Formula Ford Championship | **3rd** | Mygale SJ00 | Tony D'Alberto Racing |
| 2002 | Australian Formula Ford Championship | 22nd | Mygale SJ00 | Tony D'Alberto Racing |
| 2003 | Konica V8 Supercar Series | 21st | Holden VX Commodore | Holden Young Lions |
| 2003 | Victorian Formula Ford Championship | 21st | Mygale SJ00 | Tony D'Alberto Racing |
| 2004 | Konica Minolta V8 Supercar Series | 8th | Holden VX Commodore | Independent Racing Cars Australia |
| 2005 | HPDC V8Supercar Championship Series | 5th | Holden VY Commodore | Tony D'Alberto Racing |
| 2006 | Fujitsu V8 Supercar Series | 6th | Holden VZ Commodore | Tony D'Alberto Racing |
| 2006 | V8 Supercar Championship Series | 53rd | Holden VZ Commodore | HSV Dealer Team |
| 2007 | Fujitsu V8 Supercar Series | **1st** | Holden VZ Commodore | Tony D'Alberto Racing |
| 2007 | V8 Supercar Championship Series | 28th | Holden VZ Commodore | Rod Nash Racing |
| 2008 | V8 Supercar Championship Series | 25th | Holden VE Commodore | Tony D'Alberto Racing |
| 2009 | V8 Supercar Championship Series | 24th | Holden VE Commodore | Tony D'Alberto Racing |
| 2010 | V8 Supercar Championship Series | 20th | Holden VE Commodore | Tony D'Alberto Racing |
| 2011 | International V8 Supercars Championship | 26th | Holden VE Commodore; Ford FG Falcon | Tony D'Alberto Racing |
| 2012 | V8SuperTourer Championship | 22nd | Holden VE Commodore | AV8 Motorsport |
| 2012 | International V8 Supercars Championship | 23rd | Ford FG Falcon | Tony D'Alberto Racing |
| 2013 | V8SuperTourer Championship | 36th | Ford FG Falcon | Cunningham Racing |
| 2013 | International V8 Supercars Championship | 16th | Holden VF Commodore | Tony D'Alberto Racing |
| 2014 | Australian GT Championship | 6th | Ferrari 458 Italia | DeFelice Homes & IL Bello Rosso |
| 2014 | International V8 Supercars Championship | 39th | Holden VF Commodore | Walkinshaw Racing |
| 2015 | Australian GT Championship | 7th | Ferrari 458 Italia | Maranello Motorsport |
| 2015 | International V8 Supercars Championship | 36th | Holden VF Commodore | Walkinshaw Racing |
| 2016 | Australian Endurance Championship | 13th | Ferrari 458 Italia; Audi R8 LMS | Maranello Motorsport |
| 2016 | International V8 Supercars Championship | 36th | Ford FG X Falcon | DJR Team Penske |
| 2017 | Virgin Australia Supercars Championship | 27th | Ford FG X Falcon | DJR Team Penske |
| 2018 | Virgin Australia Supercars Championship | 36th | Ford FG X Falcon | DJR Team Penske |
| 2019 | Virgin Australia Supercars Championship | 35th | Ford Mustang GT | DJR Team Penske |
| 2019 | TCR Australia Touring Car Series | **2nd** | Honda Civic Type R TCR (FK8) | Wall Racing |
| 2020 | Virgin Australia Supercars Championship | 29th | Ford Mustang GT | DJR Team Penske |
| 2021 | TCR Australia Touring Car Series | 14th | Honda Civic Type R TCR (FK8) | Wall Racing |
| 2022 | TCR Australia Touring Car Series | **1st** | Honda Civic Type R TCR (FK8) | Wall Racing |
| 2022 | Repco Supercars Championship | 35th | Ford Mustang GT | Dick Johnson Racing |
| 2023 | TCR Australia Touring Car Series | **2nd** | Honda Civic Type R TCR (FL5) | Wall Racing |
| 2023 | TCR World Tour | 12th | Honda Civic Type R TCR (FL5) | Wall Racing |
| 2023 | Repco Supercars Championship | 28th | Ford Mustang GT | Dick Johnson Racing |
| 2024 | TCR Australia Touring Car Series | 9th | Honda Civic Type R TCR (FL5) | Wall Racing |
| 2024 | Repco Supercars Championship | 33rd | Ford Mustang GT | Dick Johnson Racing |
| 2025 | GT World Challenge Australia Pro-Am | 12th* | Lamborghini Huracan GT3 Evo 2 | Wall Racing |

=== Complete Bathurst 1000 results ===
| Year | Team | Car | Co-driver | Position | Laps |
|---|---|---|---|---|---|
| 2005 | Tasman Motorsport | Holden Commodore VZ | (New Zealand) Fabian Coulthard | DNF | 108 |
| 2006 | HSV Dealer Team | Holden Commodore VZ | (Australia) Anthony Tratt | DNF | 93 |
| 2007 | Rod Nash Racing | Holden Commodore VZ | (Australia) Steve Owen | 6th | 161 |
| 2008 | Rod Nash Racing | Holden Commodore VE | (Australia) Jason Bargwanna | DNF | 159 |
| 2009 | Rod Nash Racing | Holden Commodore VE | (Australia) Andrew Thompson | 10th | 161 |
| 2010 | Tony D'Alberto Racing | Holden Commodore VE | (Australia) Shane Price | DNF | 38 |
| 2011 | Tony D'Alberto Racing | Ford Falcon FG | (Australia) Dale Wood | 9th | 161 |
| 2012 | Tony D'Alberto Racing | Ford Falcon FG | (Australia) Dale Wood | DNF | 122 |
| 2013 | Tony D'Alberto Racing | Holden Commodore VF | (New Zealand) Jonny Reid | 24th | 149 |
| 2014 | Walkinshaw Racing | Holden Commodore VF | (Australia) Tim Slade | DNF | 102 |
| 2015 | Walkinshaw Racing | Holden Commodore VF | (Australia) Tim Slade | 14th | 161 |
| 2016 | DJR Team Penske | Ford Falcon FG X | (Australia) Scott Pye | 5th | 161 |
| 2017 | DJR Team Penske | Ford Falcon FG X | (New Zealand) Fabian Coulthard | **3rd** | 161 |
| 2018 | DJR Team Penske | Ford Falcon FG X | (New Zealand) Fabian Coulthard | 9th | 161 |
| 2019 | DJR Team Penske | Ford Mustang Mk.6 | (New Zealand) Fabian Coulthard | 21st | 161 |
| 2020 | DJR Team Penske | Ford Mustang Mk.6 | (New Zealand) Fabian Coulthard | 4th | 161 |
| 2021 | Dick Johnson Racing | Ford Mustang Mk.6 | (Australia) Anton de Pasquale | DNF | 139 |
| 2022 | Dick Johnson Racing | Ford Mustang Mk.6 | (Australia) Anton de Pasquale | 7th | 161 |
| 2023 | Dick Johnson Racing | Ford Mustang S650 | (Australia) Anton de Pasquale | **3rd** | 161 |
| 2024 | Dick Johnson Racing | Ford Mustang S650 | (Australia) Anton de Pasquale | 7th | 161 |
| 2025 | Dick Johnson Racing | Ford Mustang S650 | (Australia) Will Davison | DNF | 53 |
| 2026 | Dick Johnson Racing | Ford Mustang S650 | (Australia) Rylan Gray | | |

=== Super2 Series results ===
(Races in bold indicate pole position) (Races in italics indicate fastest lap)

Super2 Series results
| Year | Team | No. | Car | 1 | 2 | 3 | 4 | 5 | 6 | 7 | 8 | 9 | 10 | 11 | 12 | 13 | 14 | 15 | 16 | 17 | 18 | Position | Points |
|---|---|---|---|---|---|---|---|---|---|---|---|---|---|---|---|---|---|---|---|---|---|---|---|
| 2003 | Holden Young Lions | 96 | Holden VX Commodore | WAK; R1 | WAK; R2 | WAK; R3 | ADE; R4 | EAS; R5; Ret | EAS; R6; 14 | EAS; R7; 15 | PHI; R8; 10 | PHI; R9; 21 | PHI; R10; 8 | WIN; R11; Ret | WIN; R12; DNS | WIN; R13; DNS | MAL; R14; 14 | MAL; R15; 5 | MAL; R16; 8 | | | 21st | 338 |
| 2004 | Independent Race Cars Australia | 64 | Holden VX Commodore | WAK; R1; 9 | WAK; R2; 9 | WAK; R3; 8 | ADE; R4; Ret | ADE; R5; 13 | WIN; R6; 27 | WIN; R7; Ret | WIN; R8; 9 | EAS; R9; 8 | EAS; R10; 6 | EAS; R11; 6 | QLD; R12; 10 | QLD; R13; 5 | QLD; R14; 8 | MAL; R15; 12 | MAL; R16; 10 | MAL; R17; 8 | | 8th | 714 |
| 2005 | Tony D'Alberto Racing | 99 | Holden VY Commodore | ADE; R1; 3 | ADE; R2; 3 | WAK; R3; 3 | WAK; R4; 19 | WAK; R5; 7 | EAS; R6; 4 | EAS; R7; 5 | EAS; R8; 3 | QLD; R9; 6 | QLD; R10; 9 | QLD; R11; 14 | MAL; R12; 10 | MAL; R13; Ret | MAL; R14; 7 | BAT; R15; 3 | BAT; R16; C | PHI; R17; 3 | PHI; R18; 4 | 5th | 999 |
| 2006 | Tony D'Alberto Racing | 99 | Holden VZ Commodore | ADE; R1; 5 | ADE; R2; 25 | WAK; R3; 33 | WAK; R4; 29 | WAK; R5; 9 | QLD; R6; 13 | QLD; R7; 5 | QLD; R8; 8 | ORA; R9; 4 | ORA; R10; 12 | ORA; R11; 33 | MAL; R12; 7 | MAL; R13; 17 | MAL; R14; 22 | BAT; R15; 2 | BAT; R16; 5 | PHI; R17; 3 | PHI; R18; 5 | 6th | 1443 |
| 2007 | Tony D'Alberto Racing | 99 | Holden VZ Commodore | ADE; R1; 2 | ADE; R2; 2 | **WAK**; **R3**; 2 | WAK; R4; 2 | **WAK**; **R5**; 1 | WIN; R6; 2 | WIN; R7; 3 | WIN; R8; 2 | QLD; R9; 3 | QLD; R10; 5 | QLD; R11; 3 | ORA; R12; 1 | **ORA**; **R13**; DSQ | ORA; R14; DSQ | **BAT**; **R15**; Ret | BAT; R16; 6 | PHI; R17; 9 | PHI; R18; 5 | 1st | 303 |

=== Supercars Championship results ===
(Races in bold indicate pole position) (Races in italics indicate fastest lap)

Supercars results
| Year | Team | No. | Car | 1 | 2 | 3 | 4 | 5 | 6 | 7 | 8 | 9 | 10 | 11 | 12 | 13 | 14 | 15 | 16 | 17 | 18 | 19 | 20 | 21 | 22 | 23 | 24 | 25 | 26 | 27 | 28 | 29 | 30 | 31 | 32 | 33 | 34 | 35 | 36 | 37 | 38 | 39 | Position | Points |
|---|---|---|---|---|---|---|---|---|---|---|---|---|---|---|---|---|---|---|---|---|---|---|---|---|---|---|---|---|---|---|---|---|---|---|---|---|---|---|---|---|---|---|---|---|
| 2006 | HSV Dealer Team | 16 | Holden VZ Commodore | ADE; R1 | ADE; R2 | PUK; R3 | PUK; R4 | PUK; R5 | BAR; R6 | BAR; R7 | BAR; R8 | WIN; R9 | WIN; R10 | WIN; R11 | HDV; R12 | HDV; R13 | HDV; R14 | QLD; R15 | QLD; R16 | QLD; R17 | ORA; R18 | ORA; R19 | ORA; R20 | SAN; R21; 16 | BAT; R22; Ret | SUR; R23 | SUR; R24 | SUR; R25 | SYM; R26 | SYM; R27 | SYM; R28 | BHR; R29 | BHR; R30 | BHR; R31 | PHI; R32 | PHI; R33 | PHI; R34 | | | | | | 53rd | 170 |
| 2007 | Rod Nash Racing | 55 | Holden VZ Commodore | ADE; R1 | ADE; R2 | BAR; R3 | BAR; R4 | BAR; R5 | PUK; R6 | PUK; R7 | PUK; R8 | WIN; R9 | WIN; R10 | WIN; R11 | EAS; R12 | EAS; R13 | EAS; R14 | HDV; R15 | HDV; R16 | HDV; R17 | QLD; R18 | QLD; R19 | QLD; R20 | ORA; R21 | ORA; R22 | ORA; R23 | SAN; R24; 11 | BAT; R25; 6 | SUR; R26 | SUR; R27 | SUR; R28 | BHR; R29 | BHR; R30 | BHR; R31 | SYM; R32 | SYM; R33 | SYM; R34 | PHI; R35 | PHI; R36 | PHI; R37 | | | 28th | 54 |
| 2008 | Rod Nash Racing | 55 | Holden VE Commodore | ADE; R1; 17 | ADE; R2; Ret | EAS; R3; 23 | EAS; R4; 20 | EAS; R5; Ret | HAM; R6; 13 | HAM; R7; 10 | HAM; R8; Ret | BAR; R9; 21 | BAR; R10; 23 | BAR; R11; 20 | SAN; R12; 25 | SAN; R13; 25 | SAN; R14; 25 | HDV; R15; 19 | HDV; R16; 14 | HDV; R17; 23 | QLD; R18; 20 | QLD; R19; 22 | QLD; R20; 26 | WIN; R21; 24 | WIN; R22; 16 | WIN; R23; 14 | PHI; Q 27 | PHI; R24; Ret | BAT; R25; Ret | SUR; R26; Ret | SUR; R27; 24 | SUR; R28; 18 | BHR; R29; 17 | BHR; R30; 24 | BHR; R31; 19 | SYM; R32; 24 | SYM; R33; Ret | SYM; R34; 19 | ORA; R35; Ret | ORA; R36; Ret | ORA; R37; 19 | | 25th | 890 |
| 2009 | Rod Nash Racing | 55 | Holden VE Commodore | ADE; R1; Ret | ADE; R2; 23 | HAM; R3; 20 | HAM; R4; 21 | WIN; R5; 11 | WIN; R6; 14 | SYM; R7; 25 | SYM; R8; 19 | HDV; R9; 26 | HDV; R10; Ret | TOW; R11; Ret | TOW; R12; 17 | SAN; R13; DNS | SAN; R14; 7 | QLD; R15; 16 | QLD; R16; Ret | PHI; Q 26 | PHI; R17; 15 | BAT; R18; 10 | SUR; R19; 20 | SUR; R20; 25 | SUR; R21; 13 | SUR; R22; 16 | PHI; R23; 19 | PHI; R24; 17 | BAR; R25; 22 | BAR; R26; 23 | SYD; R27; 11 | SYD; R28; Ret | | | | | | | | | | | 24th | 1196 |
| 2010 | Tony D'Alberto Racing | 3 | Holden VE Commodore | YMC; R1; 18 | YMC; R2; 19 | BHR; R3; 23 | BHR; R4; 19 | ADE; R5; 14 | ADE; R6; 7 | HAM; R7; 12 | HAM; R8; Ret | QLD; R9; 11 | QLD; R10; 10 | WIN; R11; 9 | WIN; R12; 9 | HDV; R13; 13 | HDV; R14; 17 | TOW; R15; Ret | TOW; R16; Ret | PHI; QR; 8 | PHI; R17; 15 | BAT; R18; Ret | SUR; R19; Ret | SUR; R20; 17 | SYM; R21; 21 | SYM; R22; 24 | SAN; R23; 25 | SAN; R24; 14 | SYD; R25; 13 | SYD; R26; 11 | | | | | | | | | | | | | 20th | 1325 |
| 2011 | Tony D'Alberto Racing | 3 | Ford FG Falcon | YMC; R1; 18 | YMC; R2; Ret | ADE; R3; 17 | ADE; R4; 20 | HAM; R5; 12 | HAM; R6; Ret | BAR; R7; 25 | BAR; R8; 23 | BAR; R9; 20 | WIN; R10; 26 | WIN; R11; 21 | HID; R12; 6 | HID; R13; 17 | TOW; R14; 18 | TOW; R15; 25 | QLD; R16; 25 | QLD; R17; 17 | QLD; R18; 20 | PHI; R19; PO | BAT; R20; 9 | SUR; R21; Ret | SUR; R22; 19 | SYM; R23; 15 | SYM; R24; 16 | SAN; R25; Ret | SAN; R26; 18 | SYD; R27; Ret | SYD; R28; Ret | | | | | | | | | | | | 26th | 1045 |
| 2012 | Tony D'Alberto Racing | 3 | Ford FG Falcon | ADE; R1; 21 | ADE; R2; 12 | SYM; R3; 26 | SYM; R4; 15 | HAM; R5; 18 | HAM; R6; 8 | BAR; R7; 20 | BAR; R8; 15 | BAR; R9; Ret | PHI; R10; 13 | PHI; R11; Ret | HID; R12; 15 | HID; R13; 21 | TOW; R14; 18 | TOW; R15; 14 | QLD; R16; 25 | QLD; R17; 13 | SMP; R18; 11 | SMP; R19; 20 | SAN; QR; 14 | SAN; R20; 23 | BAT; R21; Ret | SUR; R22; Ret | SUR; R23; DNS | YMC; R24; 14 | YMC; R25; 19 | YMC; R26; 17 | WIN; R27; 10 | WIN; R28; 23 | SYD; R29; 11 | SYD; R30; Ret | | | | | | | | | 23rd | 1176 |
| 2013 | Tony D'Alberto Racing | 3 | Holden VF Commodore | ADE; R1; 12 | ADE; R2; 8 | SYM; R3; 12 | SYM; R4; 13 | SYM; R5; 25 | PUK; R6; 16 | PUK; R7; 20 | PUK; R8; Ret | PUK; R9; 17 | BAR; R10; 17 | BAR; R11; 24 | BAR; R12; 18 | COA; R13; 18 | COA; R14; 25 | COA; R15; 25 | COA; R16; 21 | HID; R17; 9 | HID; R18; 18 | HID; R19; 14 | TOW; R20; 25 | TOW; R21; 6 | QLD; R22; 21 | QLD; R23; 18 | QLD; R24; 13 | WIN; R25; 11 | WIN; R26; 4 | WIN; R27; 21 | SAN; QR; 17 | SAN; R28; 23 | BAT; R29; 24 | SUR; R30; 4 | SUR; R31; 21 | PHI; R32; 12 | PHI; R33; Ret | PHI; R34; Ret | SYD; R35; 6 | SYD; R36; 14 | | | 16th | 1526 |
| 2014 | Walkinshaw Racing | 47 | Holden VF Commodore | ADE; R1 | ADE; R2 | ADE; R3 | SYM; R4 | SYM; R5 | SYM; R6 | WIN; R7 | WIN; R8 | WIN; R9 | PUK; R10 | PUK; R11 | PUK; R12 | PUK; R13 | BAR; R14; PO | BAR; R15; PO | BAR; R16; PO | HID; R17 | HID; R18 | HID; R19 | TOW; R20; PO | TOW; R21; PO | TOW; R22; PO | QLD; R23 | QLD; R24 | QLD; R25 | SMP; R26 | SMP; R27 | SMP; R28 | SAN; QR; 7 | SAN; R29; 12 | BAT; R30; Ret | SUR; R31; 3 | SUR; R32; 4 | PHI; R33 | PHI; R34 | PHI; R35 | SYD; R36 | SYD; R37 | SYD; R38 | 39th | 387 |
| 2015 | Walkinshaw Racing | 47 | Holden VF Commodore | ADE; R1 | ADE; R2 | ADE; R3 | SYM; R4 | SYM; R5 | SYM; R6 | BAR; R7; PO | BAR; R8; PO | BAR; R9; PO | WIN; R10 | WIN; R11 | WIN; R12 | HID; R13 | HID; R14 | HID; R15 | TOW; R16 | TOW; R17 | QLD; R18; PO | QLD; R19; PO | QLD; R20; PO | SMP; R21 | SMP; R22 | SMP; R23 | SAN; QR; 7 | SAN; R24; 6 | BAT; R25; 14 | SUR; R26; 14 | SUR; R27; 12 | PUK; R28 | PUK; R29 | PUK; R30 | PHI; R31 | PHI; R32 | PHI; R33 | SYD; R34 | SYD; R35 | SYD; R36 | | | 36th | 462 |
| 2016 | Dick Johnson Racing | 17 | Ford FG X Falcon | ADE; R1 | ADE; R2 | ADE; R3 | SYM; R4 | SYM; R5 | PHI; R6 | PHI; R7 | BAR; R8 | BAR; R9 | WIN; R10; PO | WIN; R11; PO | HID; R12 | HID; R13 | TOW; R14 | TOW; R15 | QLD; R16; PO | QLD; R17; PO | SMP; R18 | SMP; R19 | SAN; QR; 19 | SAN; R20; 15 | BAT; R21; 5 | SUR; R22; 18 | SUR; R23; 23 | PUK; R24 | PUK; R25 | PUK; R26 | PUK; R27 | SYD; R28 | SYD; R29 | | | | | | | | | | 39th | 429 |
| 2017 | Dick Johnson Racing | 12 | Ford FG X Falcon | ADE; R1 | ADE; R2 | SYM; R3 | SYM; R4 | PHI; R5 | PHI; R6 | BAR; R7 | BAR; R8 | WIN; R9; PO | WIN; R10; PO | HID; R11 | HID; R12 | TOW; R13 | TOW; R14 | QLD; R15; PO | QLD; R16; PO | SMP; R17 | SMP; R18 | SAN; R19; 5 | BAT; R20; 3 | SUR; R21; 19 | SUR; R22; 9 | PUK; R23 | PUK; R24 | NEW; R25 | NEW; R26 | | | | | | | | | | | | | | 27th | 612 |
| 2018 | Dick Johnson Racing | 12 | Ford FG X Falcon | ADE; R1 | ADE; R2 | MEL; R3 | MEL; R4 | MEL; R5 | MEL; R6 | SYM; R7 | SYM; R8 | PHI; R9 | PHI; R10 | BAR; R11 | BAR; R12 | WIN; R13 | WIN; R14 | HID; R15 | HID; R16 | TOW; R17 | TOW; R18 | QLD; R19; PO | QLD; R20; PO | SMP; R21 | BEN; R22 | BEN; R23 | SAN; R24; 7 | BAT; R25; 9 | SUR; R26; 11 | SUR; R27; C | PUK; R28 | PUK; R29 | NEW; R30 | NEW; R31 | | | | | | | | | 36th | 432 |
| 2019 | Dick Johnson Racing | 12 | Ford Mustang S550 | ADE; R1 | ADE; R2 | MEL; R3 | MEL; R4 | MEL; R5 | MEL; R6 | SYM; R7 | SYM; R8 | PHI; R9 | PHI; R10 | BAR; R11 | BAR; R12 | WIN; R13 | WIN; R14 | HID; R15 | HID; R16 | TOW; R17 | TOW; R18 | QLD; R19 | QLD; R20 | BEN; R21 | BEN; R22 | PUK; R23 | PUK; R24 | BAT; R25; 21 | SUR; R26; 9 | SUR; R27; 11 | SAN; QR; 13 | SAN; R28; 4 | NEW; R29 | NEW; R30 | | | | | | | | | 35th | 462 |
| 2020 | Dick Johnson Racing | 12 | Ford Mustang S550 | ADE; R1 | ADE; R2 | MEL; R3 | MEL; R4 | MEL; R5 | MEL; R6 | SMP1; R7 | SMP1; R8 | SMP1; R9 | SMP2; R10 | SMP2; R11 | SMP2; R12 | HID1; R13 | HID1; R14 | HID1; R15 | HID2; R16 | HID2; R17 | HID2; R18 | TOW1; R19 | TOW1; R20 | TOW1; R21 | TOW2; R22 | TOW2; R23 | TOW2; R24 | BEN1; R25 | BEN1; R26 | BEN1; R27 | BEN2; R28 | BEN2; R29 | BEN2; R30 | BAT; R31; 4 | | | | | | | | | 29th | 240 |
| 2021 | Dick Johnson Racing | 11 | Ford Mustang S550 | BAT1; R1 | BAT1; R2 | SAN; R3 | SAN; R4 | SAN; R5 | SYM; R6 | SYM; R7 | SYM; R8 | BEN; R9 | BEN; R10 | BEN; R11 | HID; R12 | HID; R13 | HID; R14 | TOW1; R15 | TOW1; R16 | TOW2; R17 | TOW2; R18 | TOW2; R19 | SMP1; R20 | SMP1; R21 | SMP1; R22 | SMP2; R23 | SMP2; R24 | SMP2; R25 | SMP3; R26 | SMP3; R27 | SMP3; R28 | SMP4; R29; PO | SMP4; R30; PO | BAT2; R31; Ret | | | | | | | | | NC | 0 |
| 2022 | Dick Johnson Racing | 11 | Ford Mustang S550 | SMP; R1 | SMP; R2 | SYM; R3 | SYM; R4 | SYM; R5 | MEL; R6 | MEL; R7 | MEL; R8 | MEL; R9 | BAR; R10 | BAR; R11 | BAR; R12 | WIN; R13 | WIN; R14 | WIN; R15 | HID; R16 | HID; R17 | HID; R18 | TOW; R19 | TOW; R20 | BEN; R21 | BEN; R22 | BEN; R23 | SAN; R24; PO | SAN; R25; PO | SAN; R26; PO | PUK; R27 | PUK; R28 | PUK; R29 | BAT; R30; 7 | SUR; R31 | SUR; R32 | NEW; R33 | NEW; R34 | | | | | | 35th | 192 |
| 2023 | Dick Johnson Racing | 11 | Ford Mustang S650 | NEW; R1 | NEW; R2 | MEL; R3 | MEL; R4 | MEL; R5 | MEL; R6 | BAR; R7 | BAR; R8 | BAR; R9 | SYM; R10 | SYM; R11 | SYM; R12 | HID; R13 | HID; R14 | HID; R15 | TOW; R16 | TOW; R17 | SMP; R18 | SMP; R19 | BEN; R20 | BEN; R21 | BEN; R22 | SAN; R23; 8 | BAT; R24; 3 | SUR; R25 | SUR; R26 | ADE; R27 | ADE; R28 | | | | | | | | | | | | 28th | 438 |
| 2024 | Dick Johnson Racing | 11 | Ford Mustang S650 | BAT1; R1 | BAT1; R2 | MEL; R3 | MEL; R4 | MEL; R5 | MEL; R6 | TAU; R7 | TAU; R8 | BAR; R9 | BAR; R10 | HID; R11 | HID; R12 | TOW; R13 | TOW; R14 | SMP; R15 | SMP; R16 | BEN; R17 | BEN; R18 | SAN; R19; 14 | BAT; R20; 7 | SUR; R21 | SUR; R22 | ADE; R23 | ADE; R24 | | | | | | | | | | | | | | | | 33rd | 318 |
| 2025 | Dick Johnson Racing | 17 | Ford Mustang S650 | SYD; R1 | SYD; R2 | SYD; R3 | MEL; R4 | MEL; R5 | MEL; R6 | MEL; R7 | TAU; R8 | TAU; R9 | TAU; R10 | SYM; R11 | SYM; R12 | SYM; R13 | BAR; R14 | BAR; R15 | BAR; R16 | HID; R17 | HID; R18 | HID; R19 | TOW; R20 | TOW; R21 | TOW; R22 | QLD; R23 | QLD; R24 | QLD; R25 | BEN; R26; 21 | BAT; R27; Ret | SUR; R28 | SUR; R29 | SAN; R30 | SAN; R31 | ADE; R32 | ADE; R33 | ADE; R34 | | | | | | 48th* | 57* |
| 2026 | Dick Johnson Racing | 17 | Ford Mustang S650 | SMP; R1 | SMP; R2 | SMP; R3 | MEL; R4 | MEL; R5 | MEL; R6 | MEL; R7 | TAU; R8 | TAU; R9 | TAU; R10 | CHR; R11 | CHR; R12 | CHR; R13 | SYM; R14 | SYM; R15 | SYM; R16 | BAR; R17 | BAR; R18 | BAR; R19 | HID; R20 | HID; R21 | HID; R22 | TOW; R23 | TOW; R24 | TOW; R25 | QLD; R26 | QLD; R27 | QLD; R28 | BEN; R29 | BAT; R30 | SUR; R31 | SUR; R32 | SAN; R33 | SAN; R34 | ADE; R35 | ADE; R36 | ADE; R37 | | | | |

=== TCR Australia results ===
TCR Australia results
| Year | Team | Car | 1 | 2 | 3 | 4 | 5 | 6 | 7 | 8 | 9 | 10 | 11 | 12 | 13 | 14 | 15 | 16 | 17 | 18 | 19 | 20 | 21 | Position | Points |
|---|---|---|---|---|---|---|---|---|---|---|---|---|---|---|---|---|---|---|---|---|---|---|---|---|---|
| 2019 | Wall Racing | Honda Civic Type R TCR (FK8) | **SMP**; **R1**; **2** | SMP; R2; 3 | SMP; R3; 6 | PHI; R4; 4 | PHI; R5; 15 | PHI; R6; 15 | BEN; R7; 13 | BEN; R8; 9 | BEN; R9; 7 | QLD; R10; 4 | QLD; R11; 4 | QLD; R12; 3 | WIN; R13; 6 | WIN; R14; 7 | WIN; R15; 5 | SAN; R16; 15 | SAN; R17; 4 | SAN; R18; 3 | BEN; R19; 3 | BEN; R20; 5 | BEN; R21; 5 | 2nd | 567 |
| 2021 | Wall Racing | Honda Civic Type R TCR (FK8) | SYM; R1; 5 | SYM; R2; 9 | SYM; R3; 12 | PHI; R4; 5 | PHI; R5; 4 | PHI; R6; 2 | BAT; R7; 10 | BAT; R8; Ret | BAT; R9; 21 | SMP; R10; 4 | SMP; R11; 10 | SMP; R12; 9 | BAT; R13 | BAT; R14 | BAT; R15 | | | | | | | 14th | 290 |
| 2022 | Wall Racing | Honda Civic Type R TCR (FK8) | SYM; R1; 8 | SYM; R2; 3 | SYM; R3; 2 | PHI; R4; 7 | PHI; R5; 3 | PHI; R6; 5 | BAT; R7; 7 | BAT; R8; 6 | BAT; R9; 8 | SMP; R10; 8 | SMP; R11; 4 | SMP; R12; 14 | **QLD**; **R13**; **1** | QLD; R14; 5 | **QLD**; **R15**; **1** | SAN; R16; 4 | SAN; R17; 4 | SAN; R18; 5 | BAT; R19; 12 | BAT; R20; C | BAT; R21; 11 | 1st | 658 |
| 2023 | Wall Racing | Honda Civic Type R TCR (FK8) Honda Civic Type R TCR (FL5) | SYM; R1; 2 | SYM; R2; 7 | SYM; R3; 2 | PHI; R4; Ret | PHI; R5; 13 | PHI; R6; 11 | WIN; R7; 6 | WIN; R8; 6 | WIN; R9; 6 | QLD; R13; 2 | QLD; R14; 7 | QLD; R15; 10 | SAN; R16; 1 | SAN; R17; 9 | SAN; R18; 3 | SMP; R19; 15 | SMP; R20; 12 | SMP; R21; 10 | **BAT**; **R22**; **3** | BAT; R23; 8 | BAT; R24; 4 | 2nd | 759 |
| 2024 | Wall Racing | Honda Civic Type R TCR (FL5) | SAN; R1; 3 | SAN; R2; 7 | SAN; R3; 6 | **SYM**; **R4**; **1** | SYM; R5; 4 | SYM; R6; WD | **PHI**; **R7**; **14** | PHI; R8; 8 | PHI; R9; 4 | **BND**; **R10**; **2** | BND; R11; 13 | BND; R12; 6 | QLD; R13; 1 | QLD; R14; 4 | QLD; R15; 1 | SMP; R16; 5 | SMP; R17; Ret | SMP; R18; DNS | BAT; R19 | BAT; R20 | BAT; R21 | 8th | 490 |

Sporting positions
| Preceded by Adam Macrow | Winner of the Fujitsu V8 Supercars Series; 2007 | Succeeded by Steve Owen |
| Preceded by Chaz Mostert | Winner of the TCR Australia Touring Car Series; 2022 | Succeeded by Josh Buchan |
