= 2009 L&H 500 =

2009 Supercar Championship event

(Victoria (state)) 2009 L&H 500
Event Information
- Round 9 of 14 in the 2009 V8 Supercar Championship Series
- Date: 11–13 September 2009
- Location: Phillip Island, Victoria
- Venue: Phillip Island Grand Prix Circuit
- Weather: Fine

Results
Race 1
Distance	113 laps	500 km
Pole position	Mark Winterbottom; Steven Richards; Ford Performance Racing	determined by heats
Winner	Garth Tander; Will Davison; Holden Racing Team	3:09:47.8436

The 2009 Phillip Island 500 (known for naming rights reasons as the 2009 L&H 500) was the ninth round of the 2009 V8 Supercar Championship Series. It was the ninth ATCC/V8 Supercar event to be held at the Phillip Island Grand Prix Circuit in an endurance format, the first endurance event of the season, and was held on the weekend of 11 to 13 September in Phillip Island, Victoria.

The grid order for the race was determined by two heats where each driver partook in one race each, with the aggregate positioning would determine their place on the grid. The Ford Performance Racing duo of Mark Winterbottom and Steven Richards would start from pole for the event, in no small part thanks to Winterbottom's win in the second heat. The Triple Eight Race Engineering entrant of Jamie Whincup and Craig Lowndes were the hot favourites for the event and backed this up by setting the pace throughout the race, leading right up until the last lap. However, a delaminating tyre for Lowndes with a lap to go allowed Garth Tander to close in rapidly and scythed past with half a lap remaining to take victory for both he and co-driver Will Davison.

== Background ==
Unique to this event, two preliminary 14 lap Qualifying Races were held on Saturday with the two drivers of each car starting one race each. A single pitstop by each car in either race was mandated with the combined results of the two races determining the grid for the main 500 kilometre race. The three races all carried championship points and together constituted "Race 17" of the championship. However the finishing positions at the end of the 500 km race were deemed to be the finishing positions of the "2009 L&H 500" regardless of the total points scored by drivers over the three individual races.

For the first time since 2004, teams from outside of the V8 Supercar Championship Series were invited to compete in a championship race. Consequently, three single-car teams from the 2009 Fujitsu V8 Supercar Series contested the L&H500, bringing the total entry up to 32 cars.

== Qualifying ==
Qualifying was held on Saturday 12 September 2009. Driver A Qualifying was interrupted by a red flag after Greg Ritter spun his Garry Rogers Motorsport Commodore in a sensitive position at turn 3 in the middle of the session which upset session plans for many teams. Paul Dumbrell set a time early in the session before the red which ended up standing for the session, taking pole position in his first drive for the Holden Racing Team. Todd Kelly worked down to his time, just one hundredth of a second behind Dumbrell. Will Davison and Steven Johnson also set their best laps early in the session to fill the second row of the grid. Warren Luff ably backed up teammate Johnson to be the fastest of the non-full-time V8 Supercar drivers in fifth position alongside the Ford of Steven Richards. David Reynolds was seventh fastest, a career best, ahead of Craig Lowndes with Dean Canto and Cameron McConville completing the tenth fastest drivers. Of the remaining positions the full-time drivers were generally faster. The best of the three wild card entries was Brad Lowe in 27th while at the tail Andrew Fisher was eighth tenths slower than Leanne Tander. Dean Fiore was excluded from qualifying and started the Driver A race from pit lane.

Mark Winterbottom recorded the fastest lap of either session to take Driver B pole position ahead of Fabian Coulthard and Rick Kelly, both of whom were faster than Dumbrell's Driver A pole position. James Courtney, Jason Richards, Jason Bright, Jamie Whincup, Garth Tander, Alex Davison and Jonathon Webb completed the top ten. Webb, matching his co-driver Luff to be the fastest part-time V8 racer. Andrew Thompson was impressive in eleventh. Damian Assaillit was the fastest wildcard driver in 25th, just behind triple touring car world champion Andy Priaulx. The other triple world champ, Superbike's Troy Bayliss was last, the slowest driver of the day and a full second slower than Tony Ricciardello who was 31st in the Driver B session.

== Driver A Race ==
Poor start by both Dick Johnson Racing Falcons, but particularly Steven Johnson made a mess of the start. Todd Kelly took the early lead from Paul Dumbrell and Will Davison. Craig Lowndes forced past Steven Richards into fourth position with David Reynolds and Dean Canto in close company. Dumbrell lost two spots in the next few laps as Lowndes charged through the field.

Karl Reindler was spun by Paul Morris on the opening lap while Brad Lowe pitted with a steering problem. Jason Richards, Steven Johnson and Michael Patrizi pitted early in the race getting the compulsory stop for either race out of the way. For Johnson after dropping 20 positions at the start, he had nothing to lose by pitting.

Kelly and Lowndes raced clear of the field to take the top two positions. Davison was third ahead of Shane van Gisbergen who climbed through the field from outside the top ten to finish fourth. Russell Ingall climbed into fifth while Dumbrell faded to sixth. Reynolds was seventh ahead of Canto, Steve Owen and Dane Allan Simonsen.

Steven Richards and Cameron McConville were the best finishing drivers who made pitstops, finishing 15th and 16th. Johnson recovered to 19th. Lowe finished four laps down, but did finish with all cars making the finish. Morris was subsequently disqualified for his contact with Reindler.

== Driver B Race ==
The first race was held on Saturday 12 September 2009. Jason Richards stalled on the grid, but got going again, Warren Luff was also slow away. Mark Winterbottom led Fabian Coulthard, Rick Kelly, Garth Tander, James Courtney, Jason Bright and Jamie Whincup.

Tony Ricciardello speared off and beached his Commodore at the final turn of the opening lap and Nathan Pretty pitted with damage and retired without completing a lap. A safety car was called to retrieve Ricciardello. Greg Murphy spun at the restart at Siberia after contact with Jason Bargwanna. Tander and Alex Davison were the first to stop. The Stone Brothers Racing team serviced their car faster, but not by enough, and the pair made contact in pitlane.

A broken ballast bracket on Rick Kelly's car broke loose, dragging underneath the car. A black flag was prepared for Kelly and he pitted immediately for repairs.

Winterbottom dominated the race, and combined with Steven Richards result from the Driver A race secured pole position for the 500 kilometre race on Sunday. Fabian Coulthard's second position was a career best with Jason Bright finishing third. James Courtney was fourth ahead of David Besnard (best part-time racer), Jason Bargwanna, Andrew Thompson, John McIntyre, Jonathon Webb with Jason Richards completing the top ten race positions. Jamie Whincup was the best of the pitstop drivers in 19th position, a result good enough the secure the other front row starting position.

== 500km Race ==
The 500 km race was held on Sunday 13 September 2009. Dean Fiore broke an alternator, depriving Troy Bayliss of his first V8 Supercar race start. Whincup won the start with Will Davison forcing past Steven Richards into second position. Alex Davison and Coulthard followed. Youlden was slowing early with bodywork rubbing a tyre after contact in the left rear corner. Coulthard had a mechanical failure in the engine bay causing a fire under the bonnet. Several cars following slid off track from spilt oil. Lap 11 contact between Karl Reindler and Dale Wood made contact and spin off track at turn 1.

Steven Richards started losing race positions dropping back to fifth as David Besnard charged through the field in the Garry Rogers Motorsport Commodore, climb to fourth behind the Davison brothers. Greg Murphy pitted early, putting Mark Skaife back into racing in second last position. Alex Davison had a wheel failure due to a loose nut on the front right wheel which has cut the wheel in half causing him to spear off at Lukey Heights whilst defending third from Besnard.

Coming down the front straight Steve Owen and Cameron McConville made contact, breaking the steering on McConville's car who then speared straight off the track at turn 1 at high speed and eventually crossed the track again between turns two and three, almost hitting Besnard. Immediately afterwards on camera McConville blamed Owen for blocking several times on the straight.

Under the ensuing safety car approximately 20 cars pitted. After the restart Lowndes and Tander having taken over their cars charged into the race lead, quickly cutting through the slower cars that had worked through to the front of the safety car queue. Further back as the field sorted itself out Lee Holdsworth left the track at turn two after contact with Allan Simonsen. Simonsen received a drive-through penalty.

On lap 32 Holdsworth with damaged to the front left corner speared off at turn one after contact on the front straight with Brad Jones. Holdsworth pulled the car up short of crossing the track again and the car limped back to the pits. Jones suffered a puncture in the right rear.

Whincup now led from Will Davison, Johnson and Rick Kelly. Lap 48 saw a power steering failure in Jason Bargwanna's Commodore. Lap 52 saw Johnson pit from third and change to Courtney. A lap later Whincup and Will Davison pitted from first and second with Lowndes rejoining ahead of Tander. Tander immediately closed the gap. Bright became the third car to have a big lose at turn one, this one from brake failure. The front right tyre then punctured.

On lap 66 Todd Kelly slowed dramatically. Brad Jones finally retired. As the race approached lap 80 Lowndes had built a small gap over Tander with Winterbottom climbing into the podium positions as Courtney lost ground. Tander pitted on lap 82. Lowndes on lap 83, rejoining still ahead of Tander. Winterbottom pitted on lap 84 from the inherited lead. Courtney pitted on lap 85 again from the lead, handing the lead to Todd Kelly. Lap 88 saw Craig Lowndes leave the circuit at turn 2, causing him to lose the lead to Tander. Ten laps later Lowndes took the lead back on the run towards turn three after the pair had a small moment at turn two.

Lowndes found front right tyre was delaminating with three laps to go. Gradually the car slowed and Tander was able to pounce halfway around the final lap to take the win. Lowndes hung on for second position ahead of Mark Winterbottom and James Courtney. The Kelly brothers finished in fifth position ahead of the best of the part-time combinations, Warren Luff and Jonathon Webb. Russell Ingall and Tim Slade, Craig Baird and Paul Dumbrell, Dean Canto and Luke Youlden and Alex Davison and Shane van Gisbergen completed the top ten race finishers.

== Results ==
=== Driver A Qualifying ===
Pos	No	Name	Team	Vehicle	Time
1	22	(Australia) Paul Dumbrell	Holden Racing Team	Holden Commodore (VE)	1:33.3204
2	7	(Australia) Todd Kelly	Kelly Racing	Holden Commodore (VE)	1:33.3314
3	2	(Australia) Will Davison	Holden Racing Team	Holden Commodore (VE)	1:33.4363
4	17	(Australia) Steven Johnson	Dick Johnson Racing	Ford Falcon (FG)	1:33.5187
5	18	(Australia) Warren Luff	Dick Johnson Racing	Ford Falcon (FG)	1:33.5769
6	6	(New Zealand) Steven Richards	Ford Performance Racing	Ford Falcon (FG)	1:33.7058
7	24	(Australia) David Reynolds	Walkinshaw Racing	Holden Commodore (VE)	1:33.7286
8	888	(Australia) Craig Lowndes	Triple Eight Race Engineering	Ford Falcon (FG)	1:33.7353
9	5	(Australia) Dean Canto	Ford Performance Racing	Ford Falcon (FG)	1:33.7670
10	8	(Australia) Cameron McConville	Brad Jones Racing	Holden Commodore (VE)	1:33.8144
11	10	(Australia) Steve Owen	Walkinshaw Racing	Holden Commodore (VE)	1:33.8206
12	9	(New Zealand) Shane van Gisbergen	Stone Brothers Racing	Ford Falcon (FG)	1:33.8242
13	33	(Australia) Lee Holdsworth	Garry Rogers Motorsport	Holden Commodore (VE)	1:33.8565
14	51	(Australia) Mark Skaife	Tasman Motorsport	Holden Commodore (VE)	1:33.8650
15	34	(Australia) Greg Ritter	Garry Rogers Motorsport	Holden Commodore (VE)	1:33.9030
16	39	(Australia) Russell Ingall	Paul Morris Motorsport	Holden Commodore (VE)	1:33.9917
17	88	(Denmark) Allan Simonsen	Triple Eight Race Engineering	Ford Falcon (FG)	1:34.1150
18	111	(Australia) Michael Patrizi	Paul Cruickshank Racing	Ford Falcon (FG)	1:34.1603
19	67	(Australia) Paul Morris	Paul Morris Motorsport	Holden Commodore (VE)	1:34.3819
20	25	(Australia) Karl Reindler	Britek Motorsport	Ford Falcon (FG)	1:34.3862
21	4	(New Zealand) Daniel Gaunt	Stone Brothers Racing	Ford Falcon (FG)	1:34.5090
22	15	(United Kingdom) Ben Collins	Kelly Racing	Holden Commodore (VE)	1:34.5186
23	11	(Australia) Dale Wood	Kelly Racing	Holden Commodore (VE)	1:34.5919
24	55	(Australia) Tony D'Alberto	Tony D'Alberto Racing	Holden Commodore (VE)	1:34.6106
25	14	(Australia) Andrew Jones	Brad Jones Racing	Holden Commodore (VE)	1:34.7007
26	3	(Australia) Mark Noske	Tasman Motorsport	Holden Commodore (VE)	1:34.7842
27	21	(Australia) Brad Lowe	MW Motorsport	Ford Falcon (BF)	1:35.0007
28	16	(Australia) Mark McNally	Kelly Racing	Holden Commodore (VE)	1:35.0687
29	23	(Australia) Sam Walter	Greg Murphy Racing	Holden Commodore (VE)	1:35.1675
30	333	(Australia) Leanne Tander	Paul Cruickshank Racing	Ford Falcon (BF)	1:35.3223
31	13	(Australia) Andrew Fisher	Sieders Racing Team	Ford Falcon (BF)	1:36.1104
DSQ	12	(Australia) Dean Fiore	Triple F Racing	Holden Commodore (VE)	excluded

=== Driver B Qualifying ===
Pos	No	Name	Team	Vehicle	Time
1	6	(Australia) Mark Winterbottom	Ford Performance Racing	Ford Falcon (FG)	1:33.1970
2	111	(New Zealand) Fabian Coulthard	Paul Cruickshank Racing	Ford Falcon (FG)	1:33.2237
3	7	(Australia) Rick Kelly	Kelly Racing	Holden Commodore (VE)	1:33.2625
4	17	(Australia) James Courtney	Dick Johnson Racing	Ford Falcon (FG)	1:33.3305
5	8	(New Zealand) Jason Richards	Brad Jones Racing	Holden Commodore (VE)	1:33.3969
6	25	(Australia) Jason Bright	Britek Motorsport	Ford Falcon (FG)	1:33.4010
7	888	(Australia) Jamie Whincup	Triple Eight Race Engineering	Ford Falcon (FG)	1:33.4777
8	2	(Australia) Garth Tander	Holden Racing Team	Holden Commodore (VE)	1:33.5145
9	9	(Australia) Alex Davison	Stone Brothers Racing	Ford Falcon (FG)	1:33.6643
10	18	(Australia) Jonathon Webb	Dick Johnson Racing	Ford Falcon (FG)	1:33.7825
11	55	(Australia) Andrew Thompson	Tony D'Alberto Racing	Holden Commodore (VE)	1:34.0372
12	34	(Australia) David Besnard	Garry Rogers Motorsport	Holden Commodore (VE)	1:34.0381
13	10	(Australia) Shane Price	Walkinshaw Racing	Holden Commodore (VE)	1:34.0838
14	39	(Australia) Tim Slade	Paul Morris Motorsport	Holden Commodore (VE)	1:34.1086
15	51	(New Zealand) Greg Murphy	Tasman Motorsport	Holden Commodore (VE)	1:34.1528
16	4	(New Zealand) John McIntyre	Stone Brothers Racing	Ford Falcon (FG)	1:34.2102
17	33	(Australia) Michael Caruso	Garry Rogers Motorsport	Holden Commodore (VE)	1:34.2228
18	3	(Australia) Jason Bargwanna	Tasman Motorsport	Holden Commodore (VE)	1:34.2643
19	22	(New Zealand) Craig Baird	Holden Racing Team	Holden Commodore (VE)	1:34.3303
20	5	(Australia) Luke Youlden	Ford Performance Racing	Ford Falcon (FG)	1:34.4054
21	88	(United Kingdom) James Thompson	Triple Eight Race Engineering	Ford Falcon (FG)	1:34.5294
22	11	(Australia) Jack Perkins	Kelly Racing	Holden Commodore (VE)	1:34.5566
23	67	(Australia) Owen Kelly	Paul Morris Motorsport	Holden Commodore (VE)	1:34.5844
24	24	(United Kingdom) Andy Priaulx	Walkinshaw Racing	Holden Commodore (VE)	1:34.8720
25	21	(Australia) Damian Assaillit	MW Motorsport	Ford Falcon (BF)	1:35.0740
26	23	(Australia) Taz Douglas	Greg Murphy Racing	Holden Commodore (VE)	1:35.1390
27	14	(Australia) Brad Jones	Brad Jones Racing	Holden Commodore (VE)	1:35.1396
28	13	(Australia) David Sieders	Sieders Racing Team	Ford Falcon (BF)	1:35.1931
29	333	(Australia) David Wall	Paul Cruickshank Racing	Ford Falcon (BF)	1:35.3223
30	15	(Australia) Nathan Pretty	Kelly Racing	Holden Commodore (VE)	1:35.5797
31	16	(Australia) Tony Ricciardello	Kelly Racing	Holden Commodore (VE)	1:35.6164
32	12	(Australia) Troy Bayliss	Triple F Racing	Holden Commodore (VE)	1:36.6139

=== Driver A Race ===
Pos	No	Driver	Team	Vehicle	Laps	Time/Retired	Grid
1	7	(Australia) Todd Kelly	Kelly Racing	Holden Commodore (VE)	14	22:29.2630	2
2	888	(Australia) Craig Lowndes	Triple Eight Race Engineering	Ford Falcon (FG)	14	+ 0.413	8
3	2	(Australia) Will Davison	Holden Racing Team	Holden Commodore (VE)	14	+ 6.435	3
4	9	(New Zealand) Shane van Gisbergen	Stone Brothers Racing	Ford Falcon (FG)	14	+ 9.338	12
5	39	(Australia) Russell Ingall	Paul Morris Motorsport	Holden Commodore (VE)	14	+ 12.847	16
6	22	(Australia) Paul Dumbrell	Holden Racing Team	Holden Commodore (VE)	14	+ 13.006	1
7	24	(Australia) David Reynolds	Walkinshaw Racing	Holden Commodore (VE)	14	+ 13.572	7
8	5	(Australia) Dean Canto	Ford Performance Racing	Ford Falcon (FG)	14	+ 19.134	9
9	10	(Australia) Steve Owen	Walkinshaw Racing	Holden Commodore (VE)	14	+ 20.683	11
10	88	(Denmark) Allan Simonsen	Triple Eight Race Engineering	Ford Falcon (FG)	14	+ 21.023	17
11	14	(Australia) Andrew Jones	Brad Jones Racing	Holden Commodore (VE)	14	+ 33.724	25
12	16	(Australia) Mark McNally	Kelly Racing	Holden Commodore (VE)	14	+ 37.617	28
13	15	(United Kingdom) Ben Collins	Kelly Racing	Holden Commodore (VE)	14	+ 40.062	22
14	12	(Australia) Dean Fiore	Triple F Racing	Holden Commodore (VE)	14	+ 41.183	32
15	6	(New Zealand) Steven Richards	Ford Performance Racing	Ford Falcon (FG)	14	+ 51.903	6
16	8	(Australia) Cameron McConville	Brad Jones Racing	Holden Commodore (VE)	14	+ 1:00.643	10
17	17	(Australia) Warren Luff	Dick Johnson Racing	Ford Falcon (FG)	14	+ 1:03.439	5
18	33	(Australia) Lee Holdsworth	Garry Rogers Motorsport	Holden Commodore (VE)	14	+ 1:07.471	13
19	17	(Australia) Steven Johnson	Dick Johnson Racing	Ford Falcon (FG)	14	+ 1:08.870	4
20	4	(New Zealand) Daniel Gaunt	Stone Brothers Racing	Ford Falcon (FG)	14	+ 1:11.025	21
21	51	(Australia) Mark Skaife	Tasman Motorsport	Holden Commodore (VE)	14	+ 1:14.396	14
22	34	(Australia) Greg Ritter	Garry Rogers Motorsport	Holden Commodore (VE)	14	+ 1:20.485	15
23	11	(Australia) Dale Wood	Kelly Racing	Holden Commodore (VE)	14	+ 1:21.328	23
24	111	(Australia) Michael Patrizi	Paul Cruickshank Racing	Ford Falcon (FG)	14	+ 1:21.752	18
25	3	(Australia) Mark Noske	Tasman Motorsport	Holden Commodore (VE)	14	+ 1:24.818	26
26	55	(Australia) Tony D'Alberto	Tony D'Alberto Racing	Holden Commodore (VE)	14	+ 1:25.085	24
27	333	(Australia) Leanne Tander	Paul Cruickshank Racing	Ford Falcon (BF)	14	+ 1:35.493	30
28	23	(Australia) Sam Walter	Greg Murphy Racing	Holden Commodore (VE)	13	+ 1 lap	29
29	13	(Australia) Andrew Fisher	Sieders Racing Team	Ford Falcon (BF)	13	+ 1 lap	31
30	25	(Australia) Karl Reindler	Britek Motorsport	Ford Falcon (FG)	13	+ 1 lap	20
31	21	(Australia) Brad Lowe	MW Motorsport	Ford Falcon (BF)	11	+ 3 laps	27
DSQ	67	(Australia) Paul Morris	Paul Morris Motorsport	Holden Commodore (VE)	14	Disqualified	19
Fastest Lap: Craig Lowndes (Triple Eight Race Engineering) - 1:34.8390 on lap 3

=== Driver B Race ===
Pos	No	Driver	Team	Vehicle	Laps	Time/Retired	Grid
1	6	(Australia) Mark Winterbottom	Ford Performance Racing	Ford Falcon (FG)	14	23:56.1139	1
2	111	(New Zealand) Fabian Coulthard	Paul Cruickshank Racing	Ford Falcon (FG)	14	+ 1.565	2
3	25	(Australia) Jason Bright	Britek Motorsport	Ford Falcon (FG)	14	+ 1.989	6
4	17	(Australia) James Courtney	Dick Johnson Racing	Ford Falcon (FG)	14	+ 6.304	4
5	34	(Australia) David Besnard	Garry Rogers Motorsport	Holden Commodore (VE)	14	+ 9.501	12
6	3	(Australia) Jason Bargwanna	Tasman Motorsport	Holden Commodore (VE)	14	+ 12.811	18
7	55	(Australia) Andrew Thompson	Tony D'Alberto Racing	Holden Commodore (VE)	14	+ 13.502	11
8	4	(New Zealand) John McIntyre	Stone Brothers Racing	Ford Falcon (FG)	14	+ 15.107	16
9	18	(Australia) Jonathon Webb	Dick Johnson Racing	Ford Falcon (FG)	14	+ 17.059	10
10	8	(New Zealand) Jason Richards	Brad Jones Racing	Holden Commodore (VE)	14	+ 17.498	5
11	33	(Australia) Michael Caruso	Garry Rogers Motorsport	Holden Commodore (VE)	14	+ 20.502	17
12	11	(Australia) Jack Perkins	Kelly Racing	Holden Commodore (VE)	14	+ 23.169	22
13	51	(New Zealand) Greg Murphy	Tasman Motorsport	Holden Commodore (VE)	14	+ 29.632	15
14	21	(Australia) Damian Assaillit	MW Motorsport	Ford Falcon (BF)	14	+ 35.383	25
15	13	(Australia) David Sieders	Sieders Racing Team	Ford Falcon (BF)	14	+ 40.182	28
16	23	(Australia) Taz Douglas	Greg Murphy Racing	Holden Commodore (VE)	14	+ 45.225	26
17	333	(Australia) David Wall	Paul Cruickshank Racing	Ford Falcon (BF)	14	+ 46.040	29
18	888	(Australia) Jamie Whincup	Triple Eight Race Engineering	Ford Falcon (FG)	14	+ 48.198	7
19	2	(Australia) Garth Tander	Holden Racing Team	Holden Commodore (VE)	14	+ 48.663	8
20	9	(Australia) Alex Davison	Stone Brothers Racing	Ford Falcon (FG)	14	+ 51.586	9
21	67	(Australia) Owen Kelly	Paul Morris Motorsport	Holden Commodore (VE)	14	+ 1:03.161	23
22	10	(Australia) Shane Price	Walkinshaw Racing	Holden Commodore (VE)	14	+ 1:06.133	13
23	39	(Australia) Tim Slade	Paul Morris Motorsport	Holden Commodore (VE)	14	+ 1:06.712	14
24	22	(New Zealand) Craig Baird	Holden Racing Team	Holden Commodore (VE)	14	+ 1:10.355	19
25	5	(Australia) Luke Youlden	Ford Performance Racing	Ford Falcon (FG)	14	+ 1:13.035	20
26	88	(United Kingdom) James Thompson	Triple Eight Race Engineering	Ford Falcon (FG)	14	+ 1:18.696	21
27	14	(Australia) Brad Jones	Brad Jones Racing	Holden Commodore (VE)	14	+ 1:23.219	27
28	24	(United Kingdom) Andy Priaulx	Walkinshaw Racing	Holden Commodore (VE)	14	+ 1:23.757	24
29	12	(Australia) Troy Bayliss	Triple F Racing	Holden Commodore (VE)	13	+ 1 lap	32
30	7	(Australia) Rick Kelly	Kelly Racing	Holden Commodore (VE)	11	+ 3 laps	3
Ret	15	(Australia) Nathan Pretty	Kelly Racing	Holden Commodore (VE)	0	Retired	30
Ret	16	(Australia) Tony Ricciardello	Kelly Racing	Holden Commodore (VE)	0	Retired	31
Fastest Lap: Mark Winterbottom (Ford Performance Racing) - 1:34.3803 on lap 4

=== Race ===
Pos	No	Driver	Team	Vehicle	Laps	Time/Retired	Grid
1	2	(Australia) Will Davison (Australia) Garth Tander	Holden Racing Team	Holden Commodore (VE)	113	03:09:47.8436	3
2	888	(Australia) Craig Lowndes (Australia) Jamie Whincup	Triple Eight Race Engineering	Ford Falcon (FG)	113	+ 2.673	2
3	6	(New Zealand) Steven Richards (Australia) Mark Winterbottom	Ford Performance Racing	Ford Falcon (FG)	113	+ 10.339	1
4	17	(Australia) James Courtney (Australia) Steven Johnson	Dick Johnson Racing	Ford Falcon (FG)	113	+ 13.343	5
5	7	(Australia) Rick Kelly (Australia) Todd Kelly	Kelly Racing	Holden Commodore (VE)	113	+ 52.010	7
6	18	(Australia) Warren Luff (Australia) Jonathon Webb	Dick Johnson Racing	Ford Falcon (FG)	113	+ 59.884	11
7	39	(Australia) Russell Ingall (Australia) Tim Slade	Paul Morris Motorsport	Holden Commodore (VE)	113	+ 1:08.513	9
8	22	(New Zealand) Craig Baird (Australia) Paul Dumbrell	Holden Racing Team	Holden Commodore (VE)	113	+ 1:11.389	14
9	5	(Australia) Dean Canto (Australia) Luke Youlden	Ford Performance Racing	Ford Falcon (FG)	113	+ 1:14.905	19
10	9	(Australia) Alex Davison (New Zealand) Shane van Gisbergen	Stone Brothers Racing	Ford Falcon (FG)	113	+ 1:17.258	6
11	51	(New Zealand) Greg Murphy (Australia) Mark Skaife	Tasman Motorsport	Holden Commodore (VE)	113	+ 1:17.985	21
12	10	(Australia) Steve Owen (Australia) Shane Price	Walkinshaw Racing	Holden Commodore (VE)	112	+ 1 lap	18
13	34	(Australia) David Besnard (Australia) Greg Ritter	Garry Rogers Motorsport	Holden Commodore (VE)	112	+ 1 lap	8
14	11	(Australia) Jack Perkins (Australia) Dale Wood	Kelly Racing	Holden Commodore (VE)	112	+ 1 lap	22
15	55	(Australia) Tony D'Alberto (Australia) Andrew Thompson	Tony D'Alberto Racing	Holden Commodore (VE)	112	+ 1 lap	16
16	24	(United Kingdom) Andy Priaulx (Australia) David Reynolds	Walkinshaw Racing	Holden Commodore (VE)	112	+ 1 lap	20
17	4	(New Zealand) Daniel Gaunt (New Zealand) John McIntyre	Stone Brothers Racing	Ford Falcon (FG)	112	+ 1 lap	12
18	15	(United Kingdom) Ben Collins (Australia) Nathan Pretty	Kelly Racing	Holden Commodore (VE)	111	+ 2 laps	30
19	333	(Australia) Leanne Tander (Australia) David Wall	Paul Cruickshank Racing	Ford Falcon (BF)	111	+ 2 laps	28
20	13	(Australia) Andrew Fisher (Australia) David Sieders	Sieders Racing Team	Ford Falcon (BF)	111	+ 2 laps	26
21	88	(Denmark) Allan Simonsen (United Kingdom) James Thompson	Triple Eight Race Engineering	Ford Falcon (FG)	111	+ 2 laps	23
22	16	(Australia) Mark McNally (Australia) Tony Ricciardello	Kelly Racing	Holden Commodore (VE)	101	+ 12 laps	29
23	21	(Australia) Damian Assaillit (Australia) Brad Lowe	MW Motorsport	Ford Falcon (BF)	93	+ 20 laps	31
24	23	(Australia) Taz Douglas (Australia) Sam Walter	Greg Murphy Racing	Holden Commodore (VE)	92	+ 21 laps	27
Ret	25	(Australia) Jason Bright (Australia) Karl Reindler	Britek Motorsport	Ford Falcon (FG)	92	Retired	10
Ret	14	(Australia) Andrew Jones (Australia) Brad Jones	Brad Jones Racing	Holden Commodore (VE)	80	Retired	24
Ret	67	(Australia) Owen Kelly (Australia) Paul Morris	Paul Morris Motorsport	Holden Commodore (VE)	62	Exhaust	32
Ret	3	(Australia) Jason Bargwanna (Australia) Mark Noske	Tasman Motorsport	Holden Commodore (VE)	46	Engine	15
Ret	33	(Australia) Michael Caruso (Australia) Lee Holdsworth	Garry Rogers Motorsport	Holden Commodore (VE)	31	Suspension	17
Ret	8	(Australia) Cameron McConville (New Zealand) Jason Richards	Brad Jones Racing	Holden Commodore (VE)	20	Collision damage	13
Ret	111	(New Zealand) Fabian Coulthard (Australia) Michael Patrizi	Paul Cruickshank Racing	Ford Falcon (FG)	4	Engine	4
DNS	12	(Australia) Troy Bayliss (Australia) Dean Fiore	Triple F Racing	Holden Commodore (VE)		Did not start	
Fastest Lap: Jamie Whincup (Triple Eight Race Engineering) - 1:34.8224 on lap 2
