= Tony D'Alberto Racing =

TDR
- Team Principal: Al D'Alberto
- Debut: 2008
- Final Season: 2013
- Round wins: 0
- Pole positions: 0
- 2013 position: 14th (1,541 points)

Tony D'Alberto Racing, was a motor racing team which competed in the V8 Supercars Championship, an Australian based motor racing series. The team, which was owned by the D'Alberto family, operated a single entry for Tony D'Alberto while on occasion fielding a second car in the second tier Dunlop V8 Supercar Series.

== Racing history ==
=== Early days ===
Formed originally as a Formula Ford racing team running a two-year-old Mygale chassis in 2002, the team sat dormant as D'Alberto moved into the Fujitsu V8 Supercar Series racing for other teams, including Independent Racing Cars Australia. In 2005 D'Alberto restarted his own team and made steady progress through the Fujitsu Series ranks before winning the series in 2007.

=== V8 Supercars ===
During the 2007 endurance racing season, D'Alberto co-drove with his old team Independent Racing Cars Australia, who were now operating the Rod Nash Racing V8 Supercar Racing Entitlement Contract. For 2008 Nash switched his franchise over to the D'Alberto team allowing TDR to race in the V8 Supercar Championship Series for the first time. The team, like all single car teams, has struggled to make progress, and has not matched performances to that of IRCA when they operated the Nash owned franchise.

2009 saw Andrew Thompson join D'Alberto for the endurance event races. Tony finished 26th in qualifying race A at the 2009 L&H 500 and Thompson finished 7th in race B and together a commendable 15th in the feature race. At the 2009 Bathurst 1000 the pair finished 10th in the 1000 km race. TDR and Nash went separate ways for 2010 when TDR brought a franchise to run in the series themselves.

The team ran under the banner of Centaur Racing in 2010 and acquired the services of Shane Price for the endurance races at Phillip Island and Bathurst, while Portuguese World Touring Car Championship driver Tiago Monteiro was signed to compete alongside D'Alberto in the Gold Coast 600 at Surfers Paradise.

In 2011, the team received sponsorship from Wilson Security and would compete under the banner of Wilson Security Racing, and following the season opening round at Abu Dhabi, D'Alberto switched to a Ford FG Falcon built by Ford Performance Racing. D'Alberto's former Walkinshaw built VE Commodore was campaigned as the team's Development Series entry driven by David Wall. Dale Wood joined the team for the endurance events at Phillip Island and Bathurst. Italian formula one driver Vitantonio Liuzzi joined the team for the Gold Coast 600.

For 2012, Wilson Security left the team, being replaced by Hiflex Mobile Hose Service. Dale Wood remained with the team for the endurance events at Sandown and Bathurst. Vitantonio Liuzzi returned for the Gold Coast 600.

The team moved back to Holden for 2013, with technical assistance from Walkinshaw Racing. Hiflex remained with the team for 2013 but the team folded at the end of the 2013 season. Its equipment was sold to Walkinshaw Racing, including the #3 Holden Commodore. After unsuccessfully trying to form an alliance with Tekno Autosports, the Racing Entitlement Contract was returned to V8Supercars.

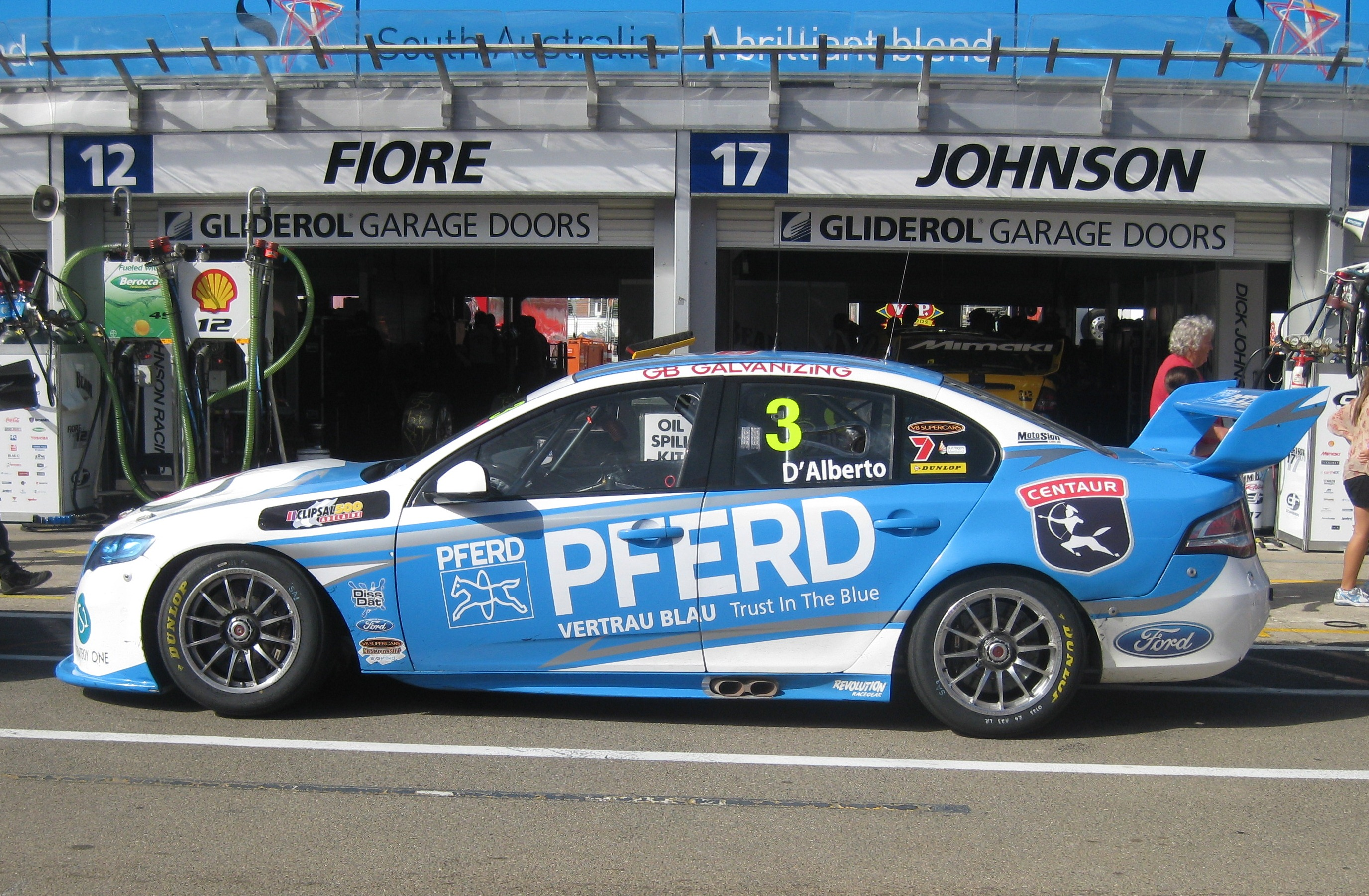
The Ford FG Falcon of Tony D'Alberto Racing at the 2012 Clipsal 500 Adelaide

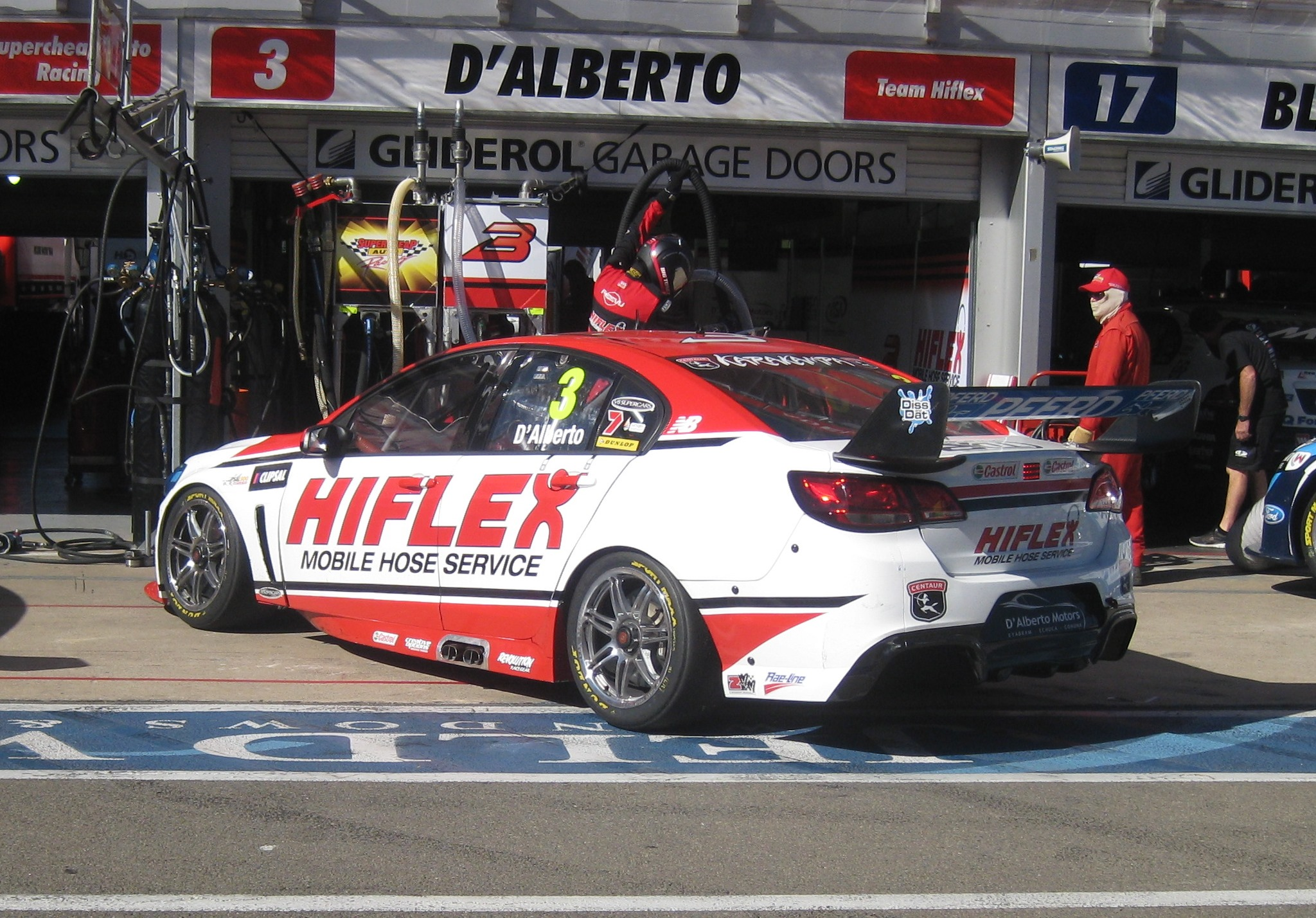
The Holden VF Commodore of Tony D'Alberto Racing at the 2013 Clipsal 500 Adelaide

=== Complete Bathurst 1000 results ===
Year	No.	Car	Drivers	Position	Laps
2010	3	Holden Commodore VE	(Australia) Tony D'Alberto (Australia) Shane Price	DNF	38
2011	3	Ford Falcon FG	(Australia) Tony D'Alberto (Australia) Dale Wood	9th	161
2012	3	Ford Falcon FG	(Australia) Tony D'Alberto (Australia) Dale Wood	DNF	122
2013	3	Holden Commodore VF	(Australia) Tony D'Alberto (New Zealand) Jonny Reid	24th	149

== Drivers ==
=== Supercars Championship Drivers ===
Part Time Drivers are listed in Italics

- (Australia) Tony D'Alberto (2008-2013)
- (Australia) Jason Bargwanna (2008)
- (Australia) Andrew Thompson (2009)
- (Australia) Shane Price (2010)
- (Portugal) Tiago Monteiro (2010)
- (Australia) Taz Douglas (2011)
- (Australia) Dale Wood (2011-2012)
- (Italy) Vitantonio Liuzzi (2011-2012)
- (New Zealand) Jonny Reid (2013)

=== Super2 Drivers ===
Part Time Drivers are listed in Italics

- (Australia) Tony D'Alberto (2005-2007)
- (Australia) Mark McNally (2006-2007)
- (Australia) David Reynolds (2008)
- (Australia) David Wall (2011)
- (Australia) Dale Wood (2011)
- (Australia) Nick McBride (2013)
