= Owen Kelly =

Australian racing driver

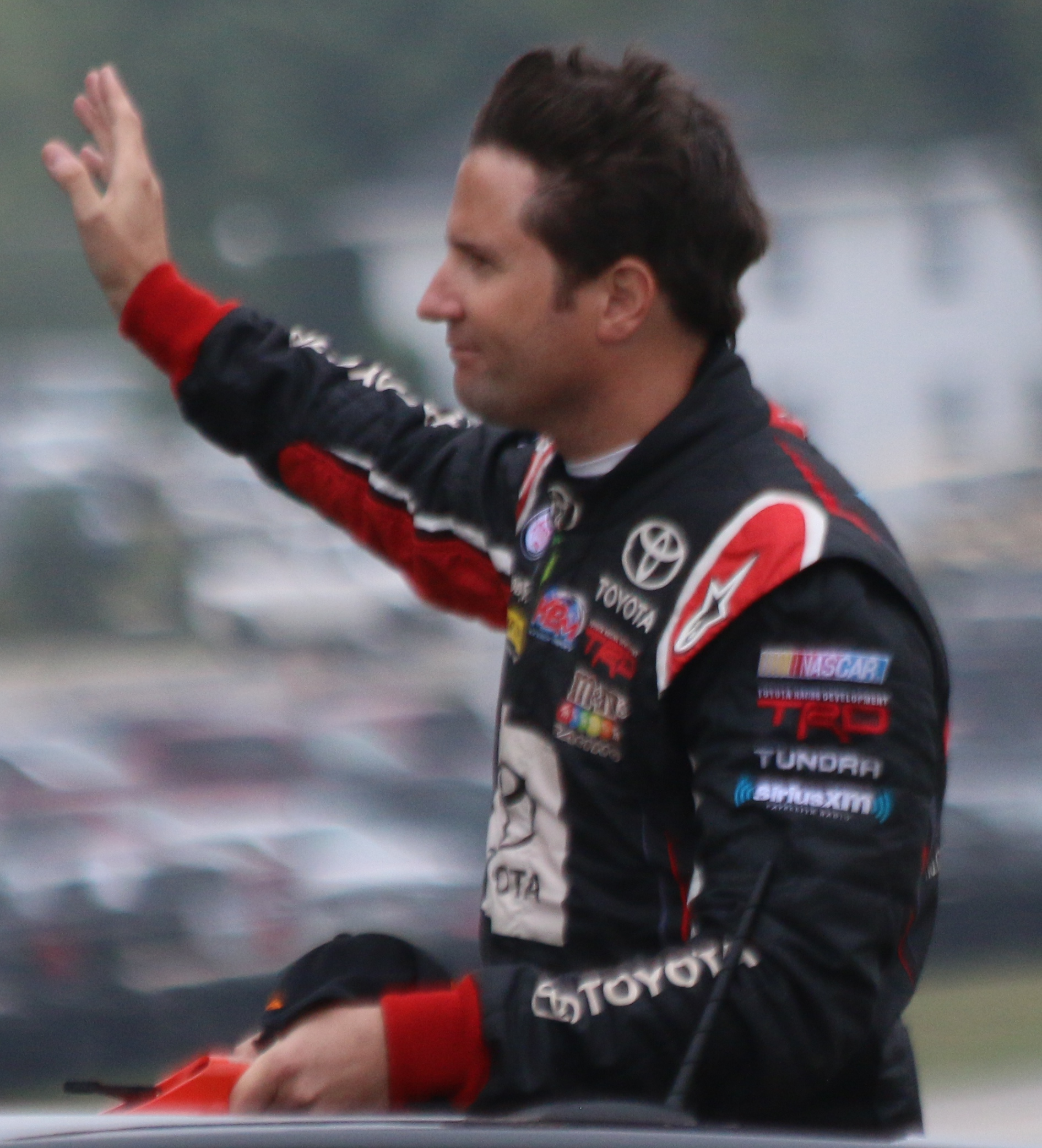
- Kelly at Road America in 2016
- Born: Owen John Kelly; 12 March 1977 (age 49); Devonport, Tasmania, Australia

NASCAR Cup Series career
- 1 race run over 1 year
- 2013 position: 63rd
- Best finish: 63rd (2013)
- First race: 2013 Cheez-It 355 at The Glen (Watkins Glen)
Wins	Top tens	Poles
0	0	0

NASCAR O'Reilly Auto Parts Series career
- 5 races run over 3 years
- Car no., team: No. 18 (Joe Gibbs Racing)
- 2016 position: 48th
- Best finish: 48th (2016)
- First race: 2010 Bucyrus 200 (Road America)
- Last race: 2016 Road America 180 (Road America)
Wins	Top tens	Poles
0	2	0

Previous series
- 1998–2000 2000–01 2001–04, 2007 2001–11 2008–09 2009: Australian Formula Ford Ch. Australian Super Touring; Development V8 Supercar; V8 Supercar; UARA Stars Late Models; Rolex Sports Car Series
- Statistics up to date as of 27 August 2016.

Owen John Kelly (born 12 March 1977) is an Australian professional racing driver. Son of Chas Kelly, he has competed over the course of his career in V8 Supercars and NASCAR among other series.

== Racing career ==
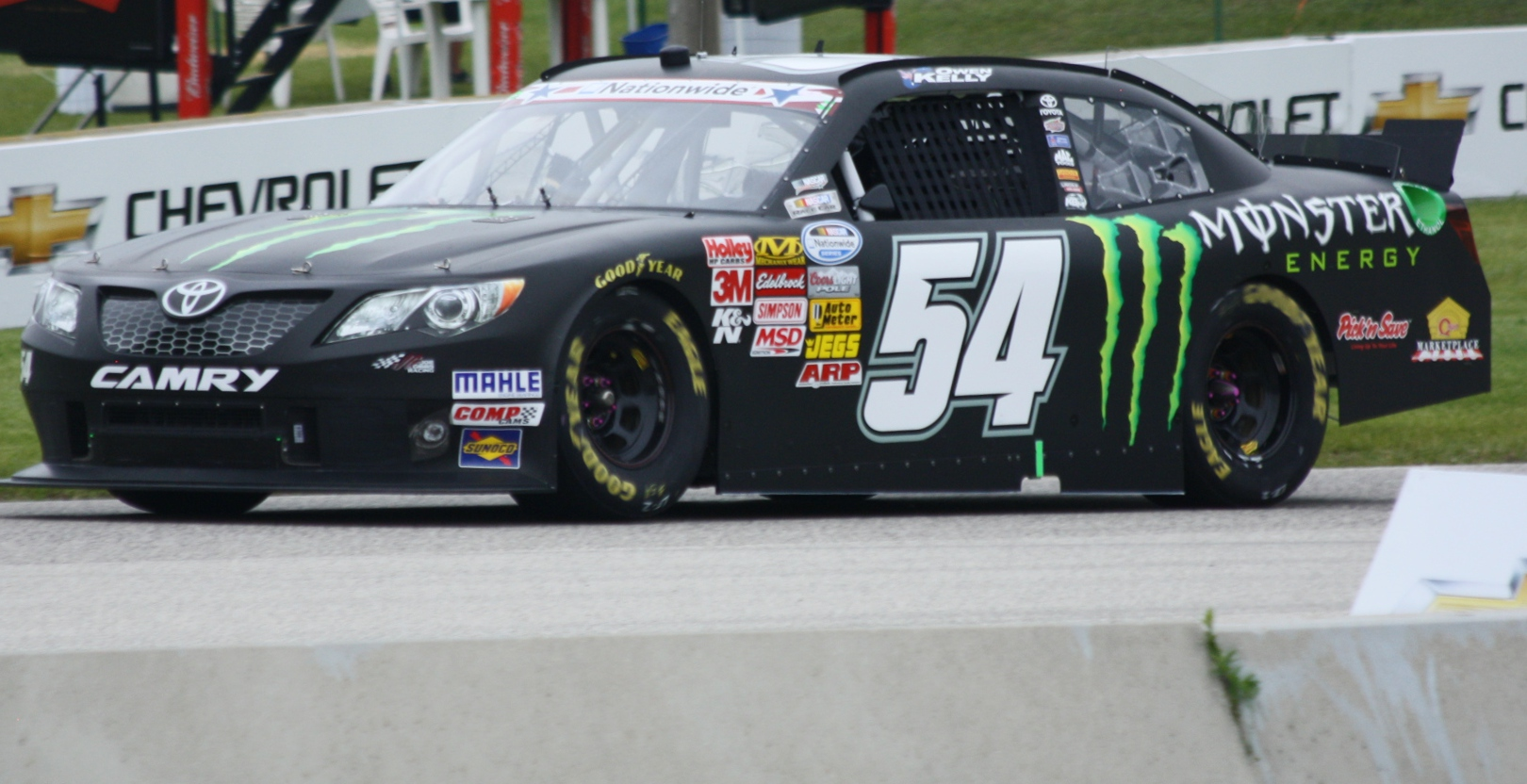
2013 NASCAR Nationwide car at Road America

Kelly started his circuit racing career in Formula Ford for three seasons, progressing to V8 Supercars in 2000. From there he has raced in Super Touring, V8 Supercars and NASCAR Late models. Late in the 2007 V8 Supercar season, he was picked up as a full-time driver for Paul Morris Motorsport, replacing Fabian Coulthard.

In 2008, Kelly raced an asphalt late model for Dale Earnhardt Jr. at Motor Mile Speedway in Radford, VA. He wanted to pursue a career in NASCAR and hoped to move up the ladder to get the necessary experience (Kelly started at the weekly track championship level). In June 2010, Kelly made his NASCAR debut in the Nationwide Series, driving for Baker Curb Racing at the Road America road course. He started ninth and finished fifth. K1 Speed sponsored the car. For 2011, Kelly made no official start in the series but relief drove for Marcos Ambrose at Montreal who was in Michigan for the Sprint Cup Series race. He practiced and qualified the car while Kelly turned the wheel to Ambrose for the race. It turned up that Ambrose actually won the race in that car. In 2012, he practiced and qualified a car again, this time for Kyle Busch who ran his first race at Montreal since 2009. Busch finished tenth in the race after starting from the back of the field due to the driver change. It ended up that Kelly did not end up making any other attempts in 2012 and Ambrose did not run the Montreal race that year.

After a strong performance for Kyle Busch Motorsports at Road America in the Nationwide Series in 2013, it was announced that Kelly would make his debut in the NASCAR Sprint Cup Series, driving the No. 51 for Phoenix Racing, at Watkins Glen International in August of that year. Kelly finished 24th.

Kelly is of no relation to Todd or Rick Kelly, the latter he co-drove with at the 2010 and 2011 Bathurst 1000s.

== Motorsports career results ==
Season	Series	Position	Car	Team
1998	Australian Formula Ford Championship	14th	Spectrum 06b – Ford	SH Racing
1999	Australian Formula Ford Championship	10th	Spectrum 07 – Ford	Owen Kelly
2000	Australian Formula Ford Championship	8th	Spectrum 07 – Ford	Owen Kelly
2000/2001	Australian Super Touring Championship	7th	BMW 320i	Nemo Racing
2001	Konica V8 Supercar Series	4th	Holden Commodore (VS)	John Faulkner Racing
2001	Shell Championship Series	39th	Holden Commodore (VT)	Romano Racing
2003	Konica V8 Supercar Series	7th	Holden Commodore (VT)	Robert Smith Racing
2003	V8 Supercar Championship Series	40th	Ford Falcon (BA)	Ford Performance Racing
2004	Konica Minolta V8 Supercar Series	5th	Ford Falcon (AU)	Dick Johnson Racing
2004	V8 Supercar Championship Series	44th	Ford Falcon (BA)	WPS Racing; Dick Johnson Racing
2005	V8 Supercar Championship Series	37th	Holden Commodore (VZ)	Paul Weel Racing; Autobarn Racing
2006	V8 Supercar Championship Series	50th	Holden Commodore (VZ)	Tasman Motorsport
2007	V8 Supercar Championship Series	24th	Ford Falcon (BF); Holden Commodore (VZ)	Ford Performance Racing; Team Sirromet Wines
2007	Fujitsu V8 Supercar Series	23rd	Ford Falcon (BA)	Kitome Racing
2008	UARA Stars	35th	?	?
2009	V8 Supercar Championship Series	56th	Holden Commodore (VE)	Paul Morris Motorsport
2009	UARA Stars	11th	?	?
2009	Motor Mile Speedway Late Models	52nd	?	?
2009	Rolex Sports Car Series	148th	Blackforest Motorsports	Ford Mustang Cobra GT
2010	Fujitsu V8 Supercar Series	32nd	Holden Commodore (VE)	Kelly Racing
2010	V8 Supercar Championship Series	35th	Holden Commodore (VE)	Kelly Racing
2010	NASCAR Nationwide Series	100th	Ford Mustang	Baker Curb Racing
2011	International V8 Supercars Championship	47th	Holden Commodore (VE)	Kelly Racing
2012	V8SuperTourer Championship	16th	Holden Commodore (VE)	M3 Racing
2012	International V8 Supercars Championship	47th	Holden Commodore (VE)	Kelly Racing
2013	NASCAR Sprint Cup Series	63rd	Chevrolet SS	Phoenix Racing
2013	NASCAR Nationwide Series	43rd	Toyota Camry	Joe Gibbs Racing
2016	NASCAR Xfinity Series	48th	Toyota Camry	Joe Gibbs Racing

=== V8 Supercar results ===
V8 Supercars results
Year	Team	Car	1	2	3	4	5	6	7	8	9	10	11	12	13	14	15	16	17	18	19	20	21	22	23	24	25	26	27	28	29	30	Final pos	Points
2000	Paul Morris Motorsport	Holden Commodore (VS)	PHI	PTH	ADL	ECK	HDV	CAN	QLD	WIN	OPK	CDR	QLD	SAN	BAT; Ret																		NC	0
2001	Romano Racing	Holden Commodore (VT)	PHI	ADL	ECK	HDV	CAN	PTH	CDR	OPK	QLD; 9	WIN	BAT; 13	PUK	SAN																		39th	432
2002	Glenn Seton Racing	Ford Falcon (AU)	ADL	PHI	ECK	HDV	CAN	PTH	ORP	WIN	QLD; Ret	BAT; DNS	SUR	PUK	SAN																		NC	0
2003	Ford Performance Racing	Ford Falcon (BA)	ADL	PHI	ECK	WIN	PTH	HDV	QLD	ORP	SAN; 8	BAT; Ret	SUR	PUK	ECK																		40th	164
2004	Dick Johnson Racing	Ford Falcon (BA)	ADL	ECK	PUK	HDV	PTH	QLD	WIN	OPK	SAN; Ret	BAT; 17	SUR																				44th	214
2004	WPS Racing	Ford Falcon (BA)												SYM; 21	ECK; 33																		44th	214
2005	Paul Weel Racing	Holden Commodore (VZ)	ADL	PUK	PTH	ECK	CHI	HDV	QLD	OPK	SAN; Ret	BAT; 6	SUR																				37th	220
2005	Perkins Engineering	Holden Commodore (VZ)												SYM; 31	PHI; 33																		37th	220
2006	Tasman Motorsport	Holden Commodore (VZ)	ADL	PUK	BRG	WIN	HDV	QLR	ORP	SAN; Ret	BAT; 15	SUR	SYM	BAH	PHI																		50th	180
2007	Ford Performance Racing	Ford Falcon (BF)	ADL	PER	PUK	WIN	ECK	HDV	QLD	OPK	SAN; 3	BAT; 13																					24th	63
2007	Paul Morris Motorsport	Holden Commodore (VZ)											SUR; 28	BAH; 22	SYM; 27	PHI; 24																	24th	63
2009	Paul Morris Motorsport	Holden Commodore (VE)	ADE; R1	ADE; R2	HAM; R3	HAM; R4	WIN; R5	WIN; R6	SYM; R7	SYM; R8	HDV; R9	HDV; R10	TOW; R11	TOW; R12	SAN; R13	SAN; R14	QLD; R15	QLD; R16	PHI; Q 23	PHI; R17; Ret	BAT; R18; 15	SUR; R19	SUR; R20	PHI; R21	PHI; R22	PTH; R23	PTH; R22	SYD; R23	SYD; R24				55th	134
2010	Kelly Racing	Holden Commodore (VE)	YMC; R1	YMC; R2	BHR; R3	BHR; R4	ADE; R5	ADE; R6	HAM; R7	HAM; R8	QLD; R9; PO	QLD; R10; PO	WIN; R11; PO	WIN; R12; PO	HDV; R13	HDV; R14	TOW; R15	TOW; R16	PHI; Q 23	PHI; R17; 4	BAT; R18; 16	SUR; R19; 14	SUR; R20; 6	SYM; R21	SYM; R22	SAN; R23	SAN; R24	SYD; R25	SYD; R26				35th	501
2011	Kelly Racing	Holden Commodore (VE)	YMC; R1	YMC; R2	ADE; R3	ADE; R4	HAM; R5	HAM; R6	PER; R7	PER; R8	PER; R9	WIN; R10; PO	WIN; R11; PO	HDV; R12	HDV; R13	TOW; R14; PO	TOW; R15; PO	QLD; R16; PO	QLD; R17; PO	QLD; R18; PO	PHI; Q 22	PHI; R19; 8	BAT; R20; 22	SUR; R21	SUR; R22	SYM; R23	SYM; R24	SAN; R25	SAN; R26	SYD; R27	SYD; R28		47th	220
2012	Kelly Racing	Holden Commodore (VE)	ADE; R1	ADE; R2	SYM; R3	SYM; R4	HAM; R5	HAM; R6	PER; R7	PER; R8	PER; R9	PHI; R10; PO	PHI; R11; PO	HDV; R12	HDV; R13	TOW; R14; PO	TOW; R15; PO	QLD; R16; PO	QLD; R17; PO	SMP; R18	SMP; R19	SAN; Q 21	SAN; R20; 27	BAT; R21; 13	SUR; R22	SUR; R23	YMC; R24	YMC; R25	WIN; R26	WIN; R27	SYD; R28	SYD; R29	47th	187

=== Complete Rolex Sports Car Series results ===
(key) (Races in bold indicate pole position, Results are overall/class)

Rolex Sports Car Series results
Year	Team	Make	Engine	Class	1	2	3	4	5	6	7	8	9	10	11	12	13	14	15	Rank	Points
2009	Blackforest Motorsports	Mustang Cobra GT	Ford	GT	DAY; 29	VIR	NJ	LAG	WAT	MOH	DAY2	BAR	WAT2	CGV	MIL	HOM				148th	2
2011	Marsh Racing	Corvette	Chevrolet	GT	DAY	HOM	BAR	VIR	LRP	LAG	WAT1	MOH	DAY2	NJ	WAT2	**CGV**; **14**	MIL			95th	17

=== NASCAR ===
(key) (Bold – Pole position awarded by qualifying time. Italics – Pole position earned by points standings or practice time. * – Most laps led.)

==== Sprint Cup Series ====
NASCAR Sprint Cup Series results
Year	Team	No.	Make	1	2	3	4	5	6	7	8	9	10	11	12	13	14	15	16	17	18	19	20	21	22	23	24	25	26	27	28	29	30	31	32	33	34	35	36	NSCC	Pts	Ref
2013	Phoenix Racing	51	Chevy	DAY	PHO	LVS	BRI	CAL	MAR	TEX	KAN	RCH	TAL	DAR	CLT	DOV	POC	MCH	SON	KEN	DAY	NHA	IND	POC	GLN; 24	MCH	BRI	ATL	RCH	CHI	NHA	DOV	KAN	CLT	TAL	MAR	TEX	PHO	HOM	63rd	0^{1}	

==== Xfinity Series ====
NASCAR Xfinity Series results
Year	Team	No.	Make	1	2	3	4	5	6	7	8	9	10	11	12	13	14	15	16	17	18	19	20	21	22	23	24	25	26	27	28	29	30	31	32	33	34	35	NXSC	Pts	Ref
2010	Baker Curb Racing	27	Ford	DAY	CAL	LVS	BRI	NSH	PHO	TEX	TAL	RCH	DAR	DOV	CLT	NSH	KEN	ROA; 5	NHA	DAY	CHI	GTY	IRP	IOW	GLN	MCH	BRI	CGV	ATL	RCH	DOV	KAN	CAL	CLT	GTY	TEX	PHO	HOM	100th	155	
2011	Richard Petty Motorsports	9	Ford	DAY	PHO	LVS	BRI	CAL	TEX	TAL	NSH	RCH	DAR	DOV	IOW	CLT	CHI	MCH	ROA	DAY	KEN	NHA	NSH	IRP	IOW	GLN	CGV; QL^{†}	BRI	ATL	RCH	CHI	DOV	KAN	CLT	TEX	PHO	HOM		NA	-	
2012	Kyle Busch Motorsports	54	Toyota	DAY	PHO	LVS	BRI	CAL	TEX	RCH	TAL	DAR	IOW	CLT	DOV	MCH	ROA	KEN	DAY	NHA	CHI	IND	IOW	GLN	CGV; QL^{‡}	BRI	ATL	RCH	CHI	KEN	DOV	CLT	KAN	TEX	PHO	HOM			NA	-	
2013	Joe Gibbs Racing	54	Toyota	DAY	PHO	LVS	BRI	CAL	TEX	RCH	TAL	DAR	CLT	DOV	IOW	MCH	ROA; 4	KEN	DAY	NHA	CHI	IND	IOW	GLN	MOH; 23	BRI	ATL	RCH	CHI	KEN	DOV	KAN	CLT	TEX	PHO	HOM			53rd	62	
2016	Joe Gibbs Racing	18	Toyota	DAY	ATL	LVS	PHO	CAL	TEX	BRI	RCH	TAL	DOV	CLT	POC	MCH	IOW	DAY	KEN	NHA	IND	IOW	GLN	MOH; 16	BRI	ROA; 17	DAR	RCH	CHI	KEN	DOV	CLT	KAN	TEX	PHO	HOM			48th	50	
^{†} - Qualified for Marcos Ambrose · ^{‡} - Qualified for Kyle Busch.

^{*} Season still in progress
^{1} Ineligible for series points

=== Complete Bathurst 1000 results ===
Year	Car#	Team	Car	Co-driver	Position	Laps
2000	67	Paul Morris Motorsport	Holden Commodore (VS)	(Australia) Aaron McGill	DNF	2
2001	24	Romano Racing	Holden Commodore (VX)	(Australia) Paul Romano	13th	159
2002	5	Glenn Seton Racing	Ford Falcon (AU)	(Australia) Glenn Seton (Australia) David Besnard	DNF‡	102
2003	19	Ford Performance Racing	Ford Falcon (BA)	(Australia) David Besnard	DNF	115
2004	18	Dick Johnson Racing	Ford Falcon (BA)	(Australia) David Brabham	17th	157
2005	50	Paul Weel Racing	Holden Commodore (VZ)	(Australia) Nathan Pretty	6th	161
2006	23	Tasman Motorsport	Holden Commodore (VZ)	(Australia) Mark Noske	15th	159
2007	5	Ford Performance Racing	Ford Falcon (BF)	(New Zealand) Matt Halliday	13th	161
2009	39	Paul Morris Motorsport	Holden Commodore (VE)	(Australia) Russell Ingall	15th	160
2010	15	Kelly Racing	Holden Commodore (VE)	(Australia) Rick Kelly	16th	161
2011	15	Kelly Racing	Holden Commodore (VE)	(Australia) Rick Kelly	22nd	159
2012	51	Kelly Racing	Holden Commodore (VE)	(New Zealand) Greg Murphy	13th	161

* Events highlighted in green denote designated co-driver role

‡Kelly practiced but did not start due to illness.
