= 2011 Adelaide 500 =

2011 Adelaide V8 supercar race

(South Australia) 2011 Adelaide 500
Event Information
- Round 2 of 14 in the 2011 International V8 Supercars Championship
- Date: 17–20 March 2011
- Location: Adelaide, South Australia
- Venue: Adelaide Street Circuit
- Weather: Fine, rain at beginning of second race

Results
Race 1
| Distance | 76 laps | 245 km |
| Pole position | Garth Tander; Holden Racing Team | 1:22.3830 |
| Winner | Garth Tander; Holden Racing Team | 2:07:57.1302 |
Race 2
| Distance | 77 laps | 248 km |
| Pole position | Will Davison; Ford Performance Racing | 1:21.2978 |
| Winner | Jamie Whincup; Triple Eight Race Engineering | 2:08:50.3685 |

The 2011 Adelaide 500, known for naming rights reasons as the 2011 Clipsal 500, was a motor race for the Australian sedan-based V8 Supercars. It was the second event of the 2011 International V8 Supercars Championship. It was held on the weekend of 17–20 March at the Adelaide Street Circuit, in Adelaide, South Australia. It was the thirteenth running of the Adelaide 500.

The event hosted races 3 and 4 of the 2011 season. The Saturday race was won from pole by 2010 Clipsal 500 winner, Garth Tander of the Holden Racing Team. The race was shortened by two laps after extended safety car periods for crashes involving Steve Owen, James Moffat and Russell Ingall. Owen crashed heavily into the infamous turn 8 wall on lap 45. Championship leader Jamie Whincup came home in second, with his Triple Eight Race Engineering teammate Craig Lowndes taking the last podium position.

Will Davison took his first pole position for Ford Performance Racing on Sunday. Steve Owen would not take part in the race due to the amount of damage sustained by his car in his Saturday crash. The race start was wet, with Whincup sliding backwards from second to fourth while Davison led Lee Holdsworth and Mark Winterbottom into turn 1. The first 20 laps involved much passing among the top eight cars. The track had dried out to a stage where slick tyres looked like a better option than wet tyres. The leaders began to pit around lap 25, just as the rain began to come down heavily. Holdsworth took on slick tyres in his pit stop and subsequently crashed into the turn 8 wall. Whincup went on to win the race from Rick Kelly and Winterbottom, extending his lead in the championship to 144 points.

== Results ==
Results as follows:

=== Qualifying Race 3 ===
Qualifying timesheet:

| Pos | No | Name | Car | Team | Time |
|---|---|---|---|---|---|
| 1 | 55 | Paul Dumbrell | Ford FG Falcon | Rod Nash Racing | 1:21.6035 |
| 2 | 88 | Jamie Whincup | Holden VE Commodore | Triple Eight Race Engineering | 1:21.6856 |
| 3 | 33 | Lee Holdsworth | Holden VE Commodore | Garry Rogers Motorsport | 1:21.7701 |
| 4 | 2 | Garth Tander | Holden VE Commodore | Holden Racing Team | 1:21.7799 |
| 5 | 5 | Mark Winterbottom | Ford FG Falcon | Ford Performance Racing | 1:21.8533 |
| 6 | 1 | James Courtney | Holden VE Commodore | Holden Racing Team | 1:21.8581 |
| 7 | 9 | Shane van Gisbergen | Ford FG Falcon | Stone Brothers Racing | 1:21.9163 |
| 8 | 15 | Rick Kelly | Holden VE Commodore | Kelly Racing | 1:21.9640 |
| 9 | 6 | Will Davison | Ford FG Falcon | Ford Performance Racing | 1:21.9666 |
| 10 | 8 | Jason Bright | Holden VE Commodore | Brad Jones Racing | 1:21.9756 |
| 11 | 888 | Craig Lowndes | Holden VE Commodore | Triple Eight Race Engineering | 1:22.0518 |
| 12 | 17 | Steven Johnson | Ford FG Falcon | Dick Johnson Racing | 1:22.0586 |
| 13 | 49 | Steve Owen | Holden VE Commodore | Paul Morris Motorsport | 1:22.0686 |
| 14 | 19 | Jonathon Webb | Ford FG Falcon | Tekno Autosports | 1:22.0797 |
| 15 | 47 | Tim Slade | Ford FG Falcon | James Rosenberg Racing | 1:22.1080 |
| 16 | 7 | Todd Kelly | Holden VE Commodore | Kelly Racing | 1:22.1757 |
| 17 | 14 | Jason Bargwanna | Holden VE Commodore | Brad Jones Racing | 1:22.1803 |
| 18 | 34 | Michael Caruso | Holden VE Commodore | Garry Rogers Motorsport | 1:22.2488 |
| 19 | 3 | Tony D'Alberto | Ford FG Falcon | Tony D'Alberto Racing | 1:22.3035 |
| 20 | 61 | Fabian Coulthard | Holden VE Commodore | Walkinshaw Racing | 1:22.3075 |
| 21 | 16 | David Reynolds | Holden VE Commodore | Kelly Racing | 1:22.3169 |
| 22 | 39 | Russell Ingall | Holden VE Commodore | Paul Morris Motorsport | 1:22.3896 |
| 23 | 4 | Alex Davison | Ford FG Falcon | Stone Brothers Racing | 1:22.3928 |
| 24 | 11 | Greg Murphy | Holden VE Commodore | Kelly Racing | 1:22.4038 |
| 25 | 18 | James Moffat | Ford FG Falcon | Dick Johnson Racing | 1:22.4125 |
| 26 | 30 | Warren Luff | Holden Commodore VE | Lucas Dumbrell Motorsport | 1:22.7384 |
| 27 | 12 | Dean Fiore | Ford FG Falcon | Triple F Racing | 1:22.7758 |
| 28 | 21 | Karl Reindler | Holden VE Commodore | Britek Motorsport | 1:23.0861 |

=== Top Ten Shootout ===
Shootout timesheet:

| Pos | No | Name | Car | Team | Time |
|---|---|---|---|---|---|
| Pole | 2 | Garth Tander | Holden VE Commodore | Holden Racing Team | 1:22.3830 |
| 2 | 88 | Jamie Whincup | Holden VE Commodore | Triple Eight Race Engineering | 1:22.6217 |
| 3 | 33 | Lee Holdsworth | Holden VE Commodore | Garry Rogers Motorsport | 1:22.6771 |
| 4 | 15 | Rick Kelly | Holden VE Commodore | Kelly Racing | 1:22.7405 |
| 5 | 5 | Mark Winterbottom | Ford FG Falcon | Ford Performance Racing | 1:22.7629 |
| 6 | 9 | Shane van Gisbergen | Ford FG Falcon | Stone Brothers Racing | 1:22.8866 |
| 7 | 6 | Will Davison | Ford FG Falcon | Ford Performance Racing | 1:23.0273 |
| 8 | 1 | James Courtney | Holden VE Commodore | Holden Racing Team | 1:23.3045 |
| 9 | 8 | Jason Bright | Holden VE Commodore | Brad Jones Racing | 1:23.4200 |
| 10 | 55 | Paul Dumbrell | Ford FG Falcon | Rod Nash Racing | 1:31.9403 |

=== Race 3 ===
Race timesheets:

| Pos | No | Name | Team | Laps | Time/retired | Grid | Points |
|---|---|---|---|---|---|---|---|
| 1 | 2 | Garth Tander | Holden Racing Team | 76 | 02:07:57.1302 | 1 | 150 |
| 2 | 88 | Jamie Whincup | Triple Eight Race Engineering | 76 | +0.5420 | 2 | 138 |
| 3 | 888 | Craig Lowndes | Triple Eight Race Engineering | 76 | +2.4714 | 11 | 129 |
| 4 | 8 | Jason Bright | Brad Jones Racing | 76 | +3.3237 | 9 | 120 |
| 5 | 61 | Fabian Coulthard | Walkinshaw Racing | 76 | +4.8142 | 20 | 111 |
| 6 | 5 | Mark Winterbottom | Ford Performance Racing | 76 | +5.1233 | 5 | 102 |
| 7 | 7 | Todd Kelly | Kelly Racing | 76 | +5.7659 | 16 | 96 |
| 8 | 47 | Tim Slade | James Rosenberg Racing | 76 | +7.0203 | 15 | 90 |
| 9 | 6 | Will Davison | Ford Performance Racing | 76 | +7.4927 | 7 | 84 |
| 10 | 14 | Jason Bargwanna | Brad Jones Racing | 76 | +8.8062 | 17 | 78 |
| 11 | 17 | Steven Johnson | Dick Johnson Racing | 76 | +9.0442 | 12 | 72 |
| 12 | 15 | Rick Kelly | Kelly Racing | 76 | +9.6261 | 4 | 69 |
| 13 | 9 | Shane van Gisbergen | Stone Brothers Racing | 76 | +9.8966 | 6 | 66 |
| 14 | 19 | Jonathon Webb | Tekno Autosports | 76 | +10.2409 | 14 | 63 |
| 15 | 12 | Dean Fiore | Triple F Racing | 76 | +11.7690 | 27 | 60 |
| 16 | 34 | Michael Caruso | Garry Rogers Motorsport | 76 | +12.1319 | 18 | 57 |
| 17 | 3 | Tony D'Alberto | Tony D'Alberto Racing | 76 | +13.8351 | 19 | 54 |
| 18 | 11 | Greg Murphy | Kelly Racing | 76 | +14.1996 | 24 | 51 |
| 19 | 21 | Karl Reindler | Britek Motorsport | 76 | +14.7265 | 28 | 48 |
| 20 | 33 | Lee Holdsworth | Garry Rogers Motorsport | 76 | +15.6680 | 3 | 45 |
| 21 | 30 | Warren Luff | Lucas Dumbrell Motorsport | 75 | +1 lap | 26 | 42 |
| 22 | 16 | David Reynolds | Kelly Racing | 74 | +2 laps | 21 | 39 |
| 23 | 4 | Alex Davison | Stone Brothers Racing | 71 | +5 laps | 23 | 36 |
| 24 | 1 | James Courtney | Holden Racing Team | 66 | +10 laps | 8 | 33 |
| 25 | 55 | Paul Dumbrell | Rod Nash Racing | 63 | +13 laps | 10 | 30 |
| Ret | 39 | Russell Ingall | Paul Morris Motorsport | 68 | Accident | 22 | |
| Ret | 18 | James Moffat | Dick Johnson Racing | 58 | Accident | 25 | |
| Ret | 49 | Steve Owen | Paul Morris Motorsport | 44 | Accident | 13 | |

=== Qualifying Race 4 ===
Qualifying timesheet:

| Pos | No | Name | Car | Team | Time |
|---|---|---|---|---|---|
| Pole | 6 | Will Davison | Ford FG Falcon | Ford Performance Racing | 1:21.2978 |
| 2 | 88 | Jamie Whincup | Holden VE Commodore | Triple Eight Race Engineering | 1:21.4781 |
| 3 | 5 | Mark Winterbottom | Ford FG Falcon | Ford Performance Racing | 1:21.4925 |
| 4 | 33 | Lee Holdsworth | Holden VE Commodore | Garry Rogers Motorsport | 1:21.5204 |
| 5 | 1 | James Courtney | Holden VE Commodore | Holden Racing Team | 1:21.5726 |
| 6 | 55 | Paul Dumbrell | Ford FG Falcon | Rod Nash Racing | 1:21.6336 |
| 7 | 19 | Jonathon Webb | Ford FG Falcon | Tekno Autosports | 1:21.7794 |
| 8 | 15 | Rick Kelly | Holden VE Commodore | Kelly Racing | 1:21.7974 |
| 9 | 888 | Craig Lowndes | Holden VE Commodore | Triple Eight Race Engineering | 1:21.8000 |
| 10 | 16 | David Reynolds | Holden VE Commodore | Kelly Racing | 1:21.8799 |
| 11 | 8 | Jason Bright | Holden VE Commodore | Brad Jones Racing | 1:21.8923 |
| 12 | 11 | Greg Murphy | Holden VE Commodore | Kelly Racing | 1:21.9298 |
| 13 | 2 | Garth Tander | Holden VE Commodore | Holden Racing Team | 1:22.0102 |
| 14 | 39 | Russell Ingall | Holden VE Commodore | Paul Morris Motorsport | 1:22.0263 |
| 15 | 17 | Steven Johnson | Ford FG Falcon | Dick Johnson Racing | 1:22.1100 |
| 16 | 14 | Jason Bargwanna | Holden VE Commodore | Brad Jones Racing | 1:22.1215 |
| 17 | 3 | Tony D'Alberto | Ford FG Falcon | Tony D'Alberto Racing | 1:22.1447 |
| 18 | 47 | Tim Slade | Ford FG Falcon | James Rosenberg Racing | 1:22.2139 |
| 19 | 7 | Todd Kelly | Holden VE Commodore | Kelly Racing | 1:22.2775 |
| 20 | 4 | Alex Davison | Ford FG Falcon | Stone Brothers Racing | 1:22.2895 |
| 21 | 61 | Fabian Coulthard | Holden VE Commodore | Walkinshaw Racing | 1:22.2943 |
| 22 | 34 | Michael Caruso | Holden VE Commodore | Garry Rogers Motorsport | 1:22.3458 |
| 23 | 9 | Shane van Gisbergen | Ford FG Falcon | Stone Brothers Racing | 1:22.3850 |
| 24 | 18 | James Moffat | Ford FG Falcon | Dick Johnson Racing | 1:22.5221 |
| 25 | 21 | Karl Reindler | Holden VE Commodore | Britek Motorsport | 1:22.5641 |
| 26 | 12 | Dean Fiore | Ford FG Falcon | Triple F Racing | 1:22.8203 |
| 27 | 30 | Warren Luff | Holden VE Commodore | Lucas Dumbrell Motorsport | 1:23.0714 |

=== Race 4 ===
Race timesheets:

| Pos | No | Name | Team | Laps | Time/retired | Grid | Points |
|---|---|---|---|---|---|---|---|
| 1 | 88 | Jamie Whincup | Triple Eight Race Engineering | 77 | 02:08:50.3685 | 2 | 150 |
| 2 | 15 | Rick Kelly | Kelly Racing | 77 | +1.3206 | 8 | 138 |
| 3 | 5 | Mark Winterbottom | Ford Performance Racing | 77 | +2.1239 | 3 | 129 |
| 4 | 1 | James Courtney | Holden Racing Team | 77 | +6.0891 | 5 | 120 |
| 5 | 2 | Garth Tander | Holden Racing Team | 77 | +8.2857 | 13 | 111 |
| 6 | 55 | Paul Dumbrell | Rod Nash Racing | 77 | +9.1218 | 6 | 102 |
| 7 | 6 | Will Davison | Ford Performance Racing | 77 | +9.8217 | 1 | 96 |
| 8 | 17 | Steven Johnson | Dick Johnson Racing | 77 | +13.1748 | 15 | 90 |
| 9 | 61 | Fabian Coulthard | Walkinshaw Racing | 77 | +15.1788 | 21 | 84 |
| 10 | 4 | Alex Davison | Stone Brothers Racing | 77 | +16.5996 | 20 | 78 |
| 11 | 19 | Jonathon Webb | Tekno Autosports | 77 | +19.6104 | 7 | 72 |
| 12 | 888 | Craig Lowndes | Triple Eight Race Engineering | 77 | +28.1154 | 9 | 69 |
| 13 | 47 | Tim Slade | James Rosenberg Racing | 77 | +30.3988 | 18 | 66 |
| 14 | 16 | David Reynolds | Kelly Racing | 77 | +32.3736 | 10 | 63 |
| 15 | 12 | Dean Fiore | Triple F Racing | 77 | +36.6389 | 26 | 60 |
| 16 | 39 | Russell Ingall | Paul Morris Motorsport | 77 | +48.5751 | 14 | 57 |
| 17 | 21 | Karl Reindler | Britek Motorsport | 77 | +51.8557 | 25 | 54 |
| 18 | 9 | Shane van Gisbergen | Stone Brothers Racing | 77 | +1:06.7521 | 23 | 51 |
| 19 | 11 | Greg Murphy | Kelly Racing | 77 | +1:11.8649 | 12 | 48 |
| 20 | 3 | Tony D'Alberto | Tony D'Alberto Racing | 76 | +1 lap | 17 | 45 |
| 21 | 34 | Michael Caruso | Garry Rogers Motorsport | 76 | +1 lap | 22 | 42 |
| 22 | 18 | James Moffat | Dick Johnson Racing | 63 | +14 laps | 24 | 39 |
| 23 | 8 | Jason Bright | Brad Jones Racing | 59 | +18 laps | 11 | 36 |
| Ret | 30 | Warren Luff | Lucas Dumbrell Motorsport | 47 | Accident | 27 | |
| Ret | 7 | Todd Kelly | Kelly Racing | 33 | Retired | 19 | |
| Ret | 33 | Lee Holdsworth | Garry Rogers Motorsport | 27 | Accident | 4 | |
| Ret | 14 | Jason Bargwanna | Brad Jones Racing | 1 | Collision | 16 | |

== Standings ==
- After 4 of 28 races.

| Pos | No | Name | Team | Points |
|---|---|---|---|---|
| 1 | 88 | Jamie Whincup | Triple Eight Race Engineering | 567 |
| 2 | 5 | Mark Winterbottom | Ford Performance Racing | 423 |
| 3 | 2 | Garth Tander | Holden Racing Team | 363 |
| 4 | 4 | Alex Davison | Stone Brothers Racing | 348 |
| 5 | 61 | Fabian Coulthard | Walkinshaw Racing | 345 |
