= Dean Fiore =

Australian professional racing driver

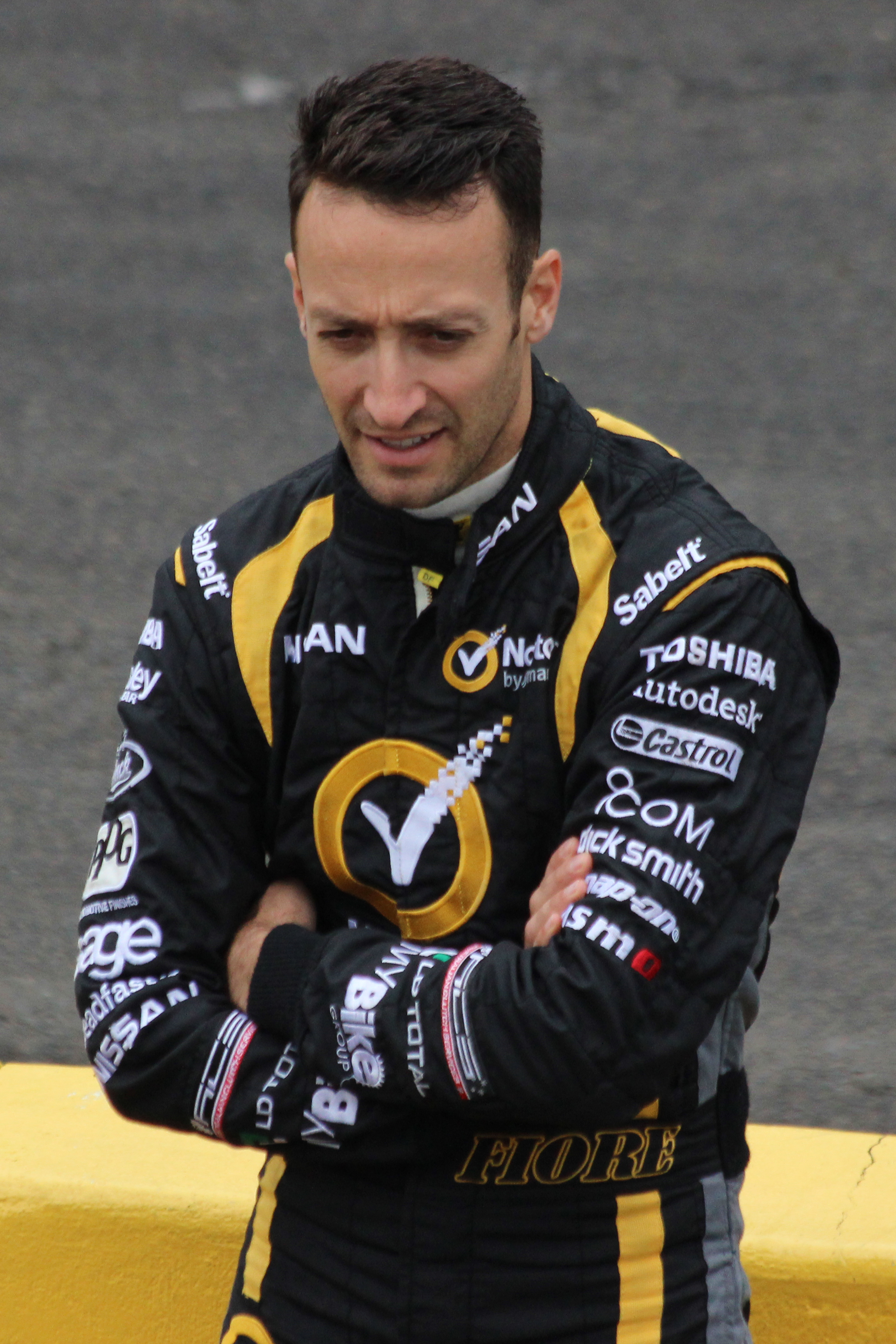
- Fiore in 2015
- Nationality: Australian
- Born: 1 December 1983 (age 42) Kalgoorlie, Western Australia
- Categorisation: FIA Silver (until 2017, 2026–); FIA Gold (2018–2025)

Supercars Championship career
- Current team: Brad Jones Racing (Endurance race co-driver)
- Championships: 0
- Races: 172
- Wins: 0
- Podiums: 1
- Pole positions: 0
- 2012 position: 19th (1395 pts)

Dean Fiore (born 1 December 1983) is an Australian professional racing driver. Fiore competed in the 2024 Bathurst 1000 for Brad Jones Racing as a co-driver alongside Jaxon Evans in the No. 12 Chevrolet Camaro.

== Racing career ==
Fiore is one of three racing brothers, along with Todd and Paul. One of a line of West Australian drivers brought up in the relatively isolated world of his home state Formula Ford series, he won the championship in 2002 and 2003. He progressed into the Australian Formula Ford Championship in 2004 and stayed there for two seasons, initially with Western Australian-based outfit Fastlane Racing. Following this, he joined and raced with Sonic Motor Racing Services where he finished top five in the points both times but did not make the top three.

Transitioning into the Australian Carrera Cup Championship along with his Sonic team, Fiore made steady progress, becoming a top-five driver in his second season before becoming series runner-up in the 2008 Australian Carrera Cup Championship.

Fiore was speculated as a potential driver who could bring sponsorship towards a beleaguered Team Kiwi Racing in V8 Supercar, and he became the first Australian to be signed as a regular driver for the pro-New Zealand racing team. However, just three events into the season, Team Kiwi Racing collapsed as a V8 Supercar operation, and Triple F Racing was formed to keep Fiore in the car for the remainder of the season.

For the 2012 season, Fiore's team linked with Dick Johnson Racing. Fiore had his best year in V8 Supercar, including outperforming DJR teammates James Moffat and Steve Owen.

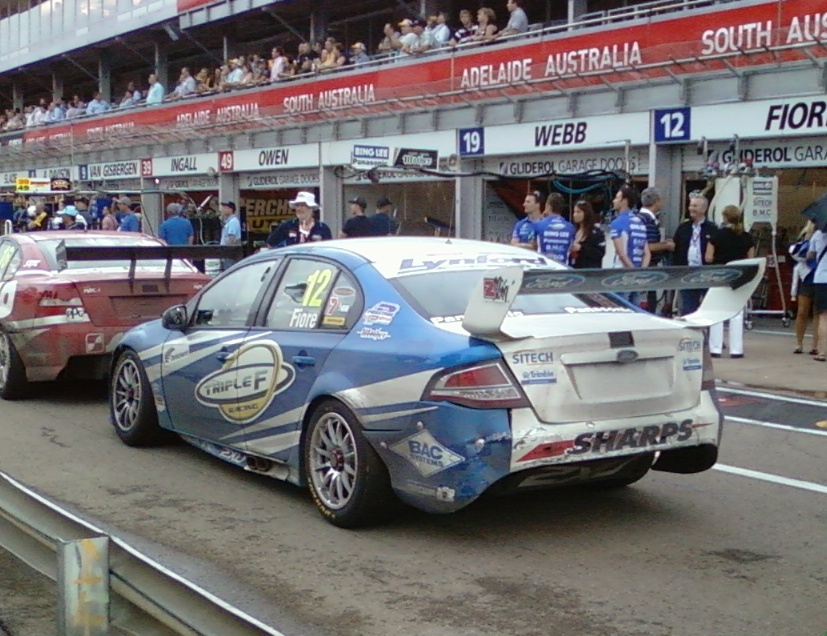
The Triple F Racing entered Ford Falcon (FG) of Dean Fiore at the 2011 Clipsal 500 Adelaide

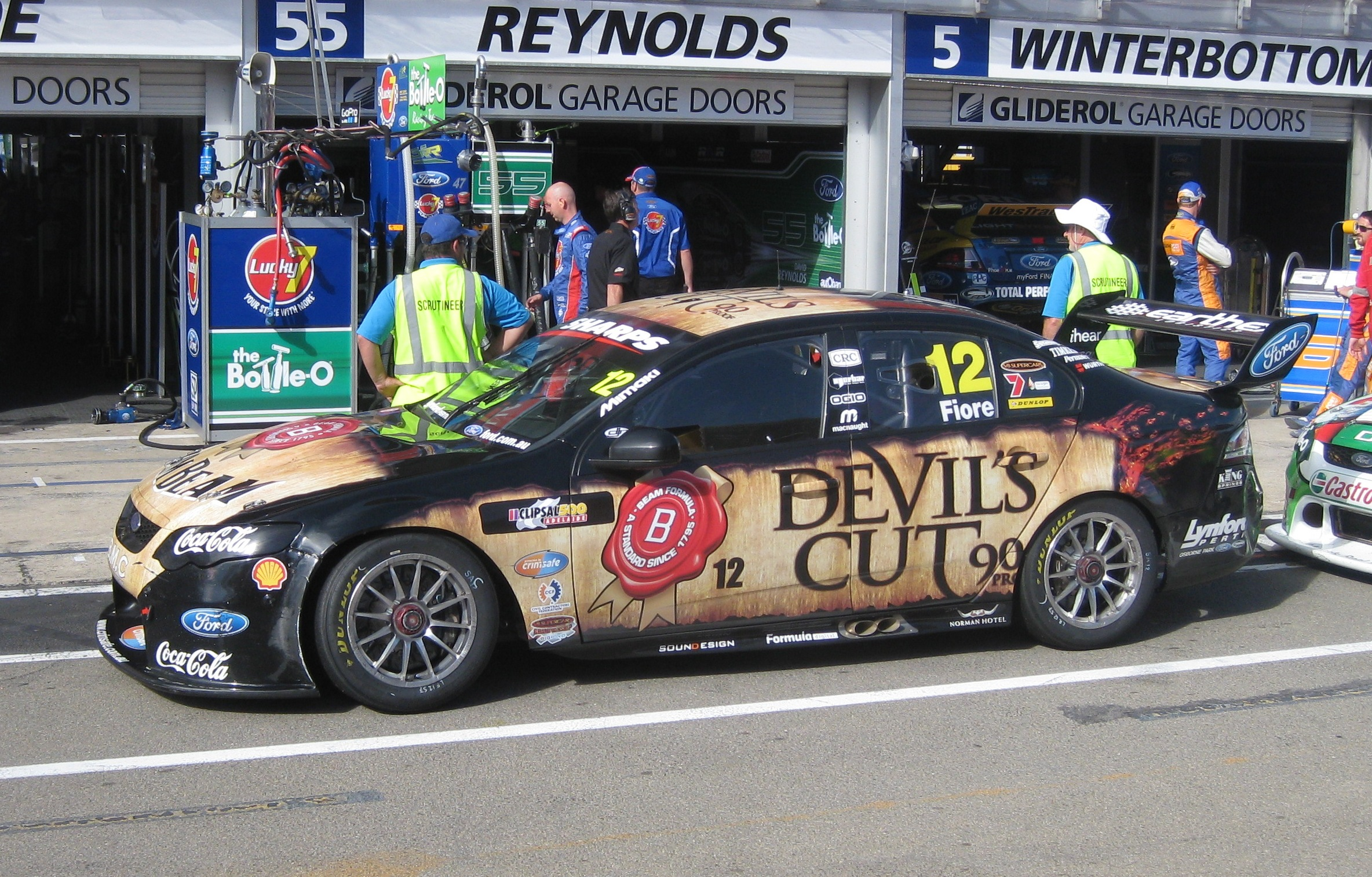
The Dick Johnson Racing entered Ford Falcon (FG) of Dean Fiore at the 2012 Clipsal 500 Adelaide

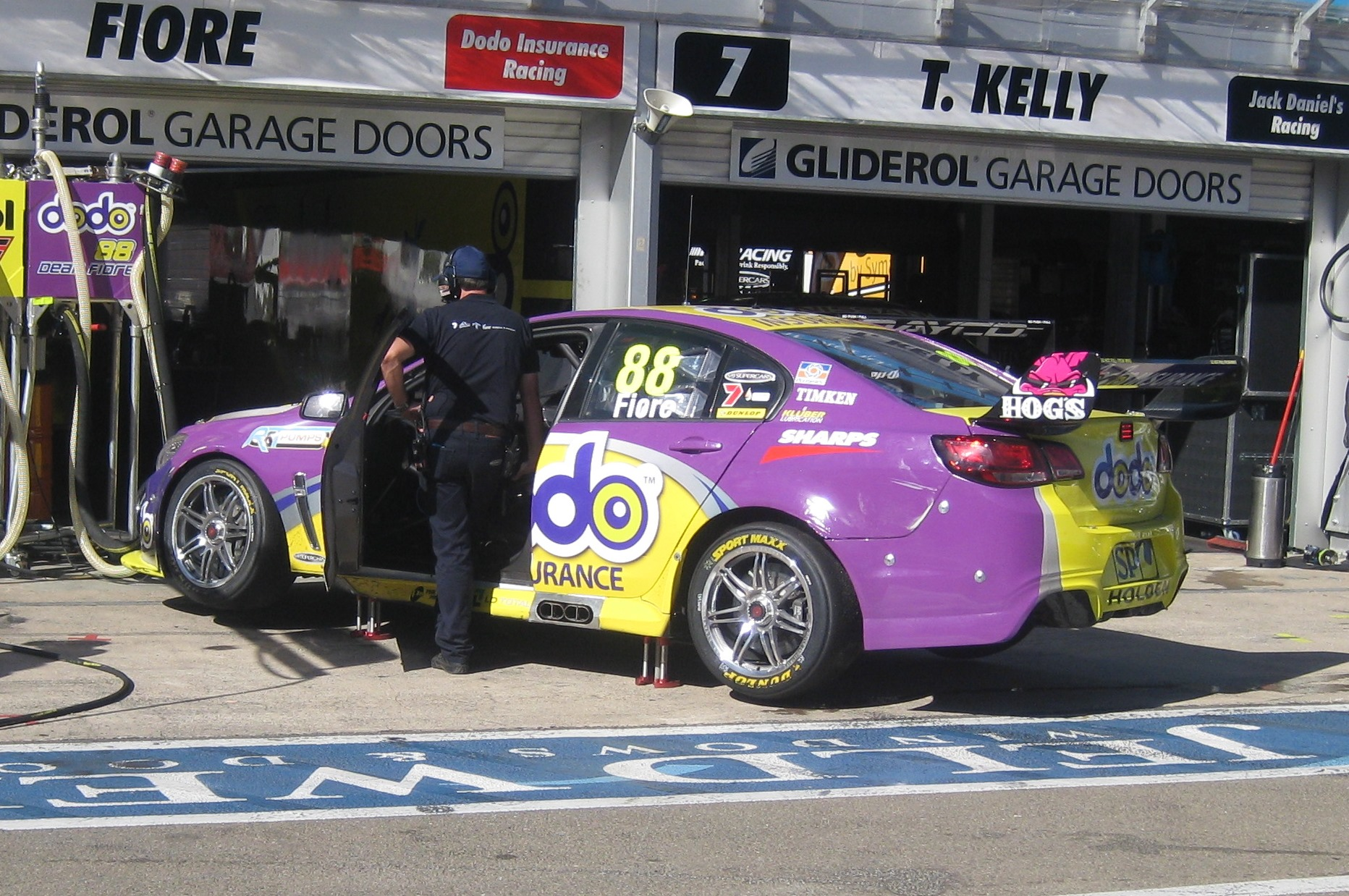
The Holden Commodore (VF) of Dean Fiore at the 2013 Clipsal 500 Adelaide

== Career results ==
Season	Series	Position	Car	Team
2002	Western Australian Formula Ford Championship	1st	Stealth Van Diemen RF94	Fastlane Racing
2003	Australian Formula Ford Championship	13th	Stealth Van Diemen RF94	Fastlane Racing
2003	Western Australian Formula Ford Championship	1st	Stealth Van Diemen RF94	Fastlane Racing
2004	Australian Formula Ford Championship	5th	Van Diemen RF04	Fastlane Racing
2004	Queensland Formula Ford Championship	7th	Van Diemen RF04	Fastlane Racing
2005	Australian Formula Ford Championship	4th	Van Diemen RF04	Sonic Motor Racing Services
2006	Carrera Cup Australia	8th	Porsche 997 GT3 Cup	Sonic Motor Racing Services
2007	Carrera Cup Australia	5th	Porsche 997 GT3 Cup	Sonic Motor Racing Services
2008	Carrera Cup Australia	2nd	Porsche 997 GT3 Cup	Sonic Motor Racing Services
2009	V8 Supercar Championship Series	28th	Holden Commodore (VE)	Triple F Racing; Team Kiwi Racing
2010	V8 Supercar Championship Series	25th	Ford Falcon (FG)	Triple F Racing
2011	International V8 Supercars Championship	27th	Ford Falcon (FG)	Triple F Racing
2012	International V8 Supercars Championship	19th	Ford Falcon (FG)	Triple F Racing
2013	International V8 Supercars Championship	24th	Holden Commodore (VF)	Lucas Dumbrell Motorsport
2014	International V8 Supercars Championship	34th	Nissan L33 Altima	Nissan Motorsport
2014	Dunlop V8 Supercar Series	21st	Ford Falcon (FG)	MW Motorsport
2015	International V8 Supercars Championship	42nd	Nissan L33 Altima	Nissan Motorsport
2016	Porsche Carrera Cup Australia	8th	Porsche 911 GT3	Porsche Centre Melbourne
2016	Supercars Dunlop Series	30th	Ford Falcon (FG)	Image Racing
2016	International V8 Supercars Championship	37th	Nissan L33 Altima	Nissan Motorsport
2017	Virgin Australia Supercars Championship	37th	Nissan L33 Altima	Nissan Motorsport
2018	Dunlop Super2 Series	7th	Nissan L33 Altima	MW Motorsport
2018	Virgin Australia Supercars Championship	52nd	Nissan L33 Altima	Nissan Motorsport
2019	Dunlop Super2 Series	19th	Holden Commodore (VF)	Eggleston Motorsport
2019	Virgin Australia Supercars Championship	46th	Nissan L33 Altima	Kelly Racing

=== Super2 Series results ===
Supercars results
Year	Team	Car	1	2	3	4	5	6	7	8	9	10	11	12	13	14	15	16	Position	Points
2014	MW Motorsport	Ford FG Falcon	ADE; R1	ADE; R2	WIN; R3	WIN; R4	BAR; R5; 3	BAR; R6; 3	TOW; R7; 6	TOW; R8; 6	QLD; R9	QLD; R10	BAT; R11	SYD; R12	SYD; R13				21st	462
2016	Image Racing	Ford FG Falcon	ADE; R1	ADE; R2	PHI; R3; 14	PHI; R4; 11	PHI; R5; 25	BAR; R6	BAR; R7	BAR; R8	TOW; R9	TOW; R10	SAN; R11	SAN; R12	SAN; R13	BAT; R14	SYD; R15	SYD; R16	30th	110
2018	MW Motorsport	Nissan Altima L33	ADE; R1; 13	ADE; R2; 9	ADE; R3; 12	SYM; R4; 15	SYM; R5; 10	SYM; R6; Ret	BAR; R7; 2	BAR; R8; 12	BAR; R9; 1	TOW; R10; 8	TOW; R11; 12	SAN; R12; 19	SAN; R13; 18	BAT; R14; 1	NEW; R15; Ret	NEW; R16; C	7th	1034
2019	Eggleston Motorsport	Holden VF Commodore	ADE; R1; Ret	ADE; R2; 15	ADE; R3; 8	BAR; R4; 8	BAR; R5; 4	TOW; R6	TOW; R7	QLD; R8	QLD; R9	BAT; R10	SAN; R11	SAN; R12	NEW; R13	NEW; R14			19th	310
2022	MW Motorsport	Nissan Altima L33	SMP; R1	SMP; R2	BAR; R3	BAR; R4	TOW; R5	TOW; R6	SAN; R7; 3	SAN; R8; 5	BAT; R9	BAT; R10	ADE; R11	ADE; R12					18th	240
2024	AIM Motorsport Australia	Ford Mustang S550	BAT1; R1	BAT1; R2	BAR; R3	BAR; R4	TOW; R5; Ret	TOW; R6; DNS	SAN; R7	SAN; R8	BAT2; R9	BAT2; R10	ADE; R11	ADE; R12					30th	0

=== Supercars Championship results ===
Supercars results
Year	Team	No.	Car	1	2	3	4	5	6	7	8	9	10	11	12	13	14	15	16	17	18	19	20	21	22	23	24	25	26	27	28	29	30	31	32	33	34	35	36	37	38	39	Position	Points
2009	Team Kiwi Racing	021	Holden VE Commodore	ADE; R1; 16	ADE; R2; 18	HAM; R3; Ret	HAM; R4; 20																																				28th	668
2009	Triple F Racing	12	Holden VE Commodore					WIN; R5; Ret	WIN; R6; 25	SYM; R7; 29	SYM; R8; 25	HDV; R9; 29	HDV; R10; 26	TOW; R11; 17	TOW; R12; 16	SAN; R13; 25	SAN; R14; Ret	QLD; R15; 24	QLD; R16; 21	PHI; QR; 14	PHI; R17; DNS	BAT; R18; Ret	SUR; R19; Ret	SUR; R20; 28	SUR; R21; 15	SUR; R22; 19	PHI; R23; 22	PHI; R24; Ret	BAR; R25; Ret	BAR; R26; 20	SYD; R27; Ret	SYD; R28; Ret											28th	668
2010	Triple F Racing	12	Ford FG Falcon	YMC; R1; 20	YMC; R2; 22	BHR; R3; Ret	BHR; R4; 20	ADE; R5; 16	ADE; R6; 22	HAM; R7; Ret	HAM; R8; 14	QLD; R9; 18	QLD; R10; 15	WIN; R11; 24	WIN; R12; Ret	HDV; R13; 20	HDV; R14; 22	TOW; R15; 20	TOW; R16; 21	PHI; QR; 11	PHI; R17; 14	BAT; R18; Ret	SUR; R19; Ret	SUR; R20; 14	SYM; R21; 23	SYM; R22; 23	SAN; R23; 19	SAN; R24; 18	SYD; R25; 14	SYD; R26; 16													25th	1070
2011	Triple F Racing	12	Ford FG Falcon	YMC; R1; 22	YMC; R2; 20	ADE; R3; 15	ADE; R4; 15	HAM; R5; 21	HAM; R6; 14	BAR; R7; 24	BAR; R8; 21	BAR; R9; 22	WIN; R10; 25	WIN; R11; Ret	HID; R12; 17	HID; R13; 19	TOW; R14; 20	TOW; R15; Ret	QLD; R16; 23	QLD; R17; 21	QLD; R18; 25	PHI; QR; 15	PHI; R19; 19	BAT; R20; 20	SUR; R21; 20	SUR; R22; Ret	SYM; R23; 19	SYM; R24; 24	SAN; R25; Ret	SAN; R26; 19	SYD; R27; Ret	SYD; R28; Ret											27th	992
2012	Triple F Racing	12	Ford FG Falcon	ADE; R1; 16	ADE; R2; 19	SYM; R3; 22	SYM; R4; 18	HAM; R5; 16	HAM; R6; 16	BAR; R7; 18	BAR; R8; 15	BAR; R9; 17	PHI; R10; 17	PHI; R11; 19	HID; R12; 19	HID; R13; 17	TOW; R14; 24	TOW; R15; 18	QLD; R16; 11	QLD; R17; 20	SMP; R18; 25	SMP; R19; 18	SAN; QR; 21	SAN; R20; 16	BAT; R21; 22	SUR; R22; 17	SUR; R23; 19	YMC; R24; 17	YMC; R25; 23	YMC; R26; Ret	WIN; R27; 19	WIN; R28; 14	SYD; R29; 15	SYD; R30; 21									19th	1395
2013	Lucas Dumbrell Motorsport	88	Holden VF Commodore	ADE; R1; 21	ADE; R2; 12	SYM; R3; 25	SYM; R4; 9	SYM; R5; 21	PUK; R6; 20	PUK; R7; 19	PUK; R8; 12	PUK; R9; Ret	BAR; R10; 17	BAR; R11; 13	BAR; R12; 15	COA; R13; 21	COA; R14; 23	COA; R15; 22	COA; R16; 18	HID; R17; 24	HID; R18; 19	HID; R19; Ret	TOW; R20; 20	TOW; R21; 24	QLD; R22; 17	QLD; R23; 26	QLD; R24; 15	WIN; QR; 25	WIN; R26; 16	WIN; R27; 16	SAN; R28; Ret	SAN; R28; 18	BAT; R29; Ret	SUR; R30; 16	SUR; R31; 19	PHI; R32; 23	PHI; R33; 20	PHI; R34; 18	SYD; R35; 17	SYD; R36; 21			24th	1211
2014	Nissan Motorsport	36	Nissan L33 Altima	ADE; R1	ADE; R2	ADE; R3	SYM; R4	SYM; R5	SYM; R6	WIN; R7	WIN; R8	WIN; R9	PUK; R10	PUK; R11	PUK; R12	PUK; R13	BAR; R14; PO	BAR; R15; PO	BAR; R16; PO	HID; R17	HID; R18	HID; R19	TOW; R20; PO	TOW; R21; PO	TOW; R22; PO	QLD; R23	QLD; R24	QLD; R25	SMP; R26	SMP; R27	SMP; R28	SAN; QR; 12	SAN; R29; 18	BAT; R30; 15	SUR; R31; 5	SUR; R32; 3	PHI; R33	PHI; R34	PHI; R35	SYD; R36	SYD; R37	SYD; R38	34th	462
2015	Nissan Motorsport	23	Nissan L33 Altima	ADE; R1	ADE; R2	ADE; R3	SYM; R4	SYM; R5	SYM; R6	BAR; R7; PO	BAR; R8; PO	BAR; R9; PO	WIN; R10	WIN; R11	WIN; R12	HID; R13	HID; R14	HID; R15	TOW; R16	TOW; R17	QLD; R18; PO	QLD; R19; PO	QLD; R20; PO	SMP; R21	SMP; R22	SMP; R23	SAN; QR; 17	SAN; R24; 11	BAT; R25; 13	SUR; R26; 20	SUR; R27; 10	PUK; R28	PUK; R29	PUK; R30	PHI; R31	PHI; R32	PHI; R33	SYD; R34	SYD; R35	SYD; R36			42nd	399
2016	Nissan Motorsport	23	Nissan L33 Altima	ADE; R1	ADE; R2	ADE; R3	SYM; R4	SYM; R5	PHI; R6	PHI; R7	BAR; R8; PO	BAR; R9; PO	WIN; R10; PO	WIN; R11; PO	HID; R12	HID; R13	TOW; R14	TOW; R15	QLD; R16; PO	QLD; R17; PO	SMP; R18; PO	SMP; R19; PO	SAN; QR; 11	SAN; R20; 14	BAT; R21; 8	SUR; R22; 17	SUR; R23; 9	PUK; R24	PUK; R25	PUK; R26	PUK; R27	SYD; R28	SYD; R29										37th	444
2017	Nissan Motorsport	23	Nissan L33 Altima	ADE; R1	ADE; R2	SYM; R3	SYM; R4	PHI; R5	PHI; R6	BAR; R7; PO	BAR; R8; PO	WIN; R9; PO	WIN; R10; PO	HID; R11	HID; R12	TOW; R13	TOW; R14	QLD; R15; PO	QLD; R16; PO	SMP; R17	SMP; R18	SAN; QR; 10	SAN; R19; 20	BAT; R20; 6	SUR; R21; 5	SUR; R22; 15	PUK; R23	PUK; R24	NEW; R25	NEW; R26													37th	465
2018	Nissan Motorsport	23	Nissan L33 Altima	ADE; R1	ADE; R2	MEL; R3	MEL; R4	MEL; R5	MEL; R6	SYM; R7	SYM; R8	PHI; R9	PHI; R10	BAR; R11	BAR; R12	WIN; R13	WIN; R14	HID; R15	HID; R16	TOW; R17	TOW; R18	QLD; R19	QLD; R20	SMP; R21	BEN; R22	BEN; R23	SAN; QR; 17	SAN; R24; 25	BAT; R25; Ret	SUR; R26; 23	SUR; R27; C	PUK; R28	PUK; R29	NEW; R30	NEW; R31								52nd	96
2019	Kelly Racing	3	Nissan L33 Altima	ADE; R1	ADE; R2	MEL; R3	MEL; R4	MEL; R5	MEL; R6	SYM; R7	SYM; R8	PHI; R9	PHI; R10	BAR; R11	BAR; R12	WIN; R13	WIN; R14	HID; R15	HID; R16	TOW; R17	TOW; R18	QLD; R19	QLD; R20	BEN; R21	BEN; R22	PUK; R23	PUK; R24	BAT; R25; 19	SUR; R26; 15	SUR; R27; 12	SAN; QR; 15	SAN; R28; Ret	NEW; R29	NEW; R30									46th	245
2020	Team 18	20	Holden ZB Commodore	ADE; R1	ADE; R2	MEL; R3	MEL; R4	MEL; R5	MEL; R6	SMP1; R7	SMP1; R8	SMP1; R9	SMP2; R10	SMP2; R11	SMP2; R12	HID1; R13	HID1; R14	HID1; R15	HID2; R16	HID2; R17	HID2; R18	TOW1; R19	TOW1; R20	TOW1; R21	TOW2; R22	TOW2; R23	TOW2; R24	BEN1; R25	BEN1; R26	BEN1; R27	BEN2; R28	BEN2; R29	BEN2; R30	BAT; R31; 6									31st	204
2021	Brad Jones Racing	14	Holden Commodore ZB	BAT1; R1	BAT1; R2	SAN; R3	SAN; R4	SAN; R5	SYM; R6	SYM; R7	SYM; R8	BEN; R9	BEN; R10	BEN; R11	HID; R12	HID; R13	HID; R14	TOW1; R15	TOW1; R16	TOW2; R17	TOW2; R18	TOW2; R19	SMP1; R20	SMP1; R21	SMP1; R22	SMP2; R23	SMP2; R24	SMP2; R25	SMP3; R26	SMP3; R27	SMP3; R28	SMP4; R29	SMP4; R30	BAT2; R31; 8									34th	180
2022	Brad Jones Racing	14	Holden Commodore ZB	SMP; R1	SMP; R2	SYM; R3	SYM; R4	SYM; R5	MEL; R6	MEL; R7	MEL; R8	MEL; R9	BAR; R10	BAR; R11	BAR; R12	WIN; R13	WIN; R14	WIN; R15	HID; R16	HID; R17	HID; R18	TOW; R19	TOW; R20	BEN; R21	BEN; R22	BEN; R23	SAN; R24	SAN; R25	SAN; R26	PUK; R27	PUK; R28	PUK; R29	BAT; R30; 9	SUR; R31	SUR; R32	NEW; R33	NEW; R34						38th	168
2023	Brad Jones Racing	14	Chevrolet Camaro ZL1	NEW; R1	NEW; R2	MEL; R3	MEL; R4	MEL; R5	MEL; R6	BAR; R7	BAR; R8	BAR; R9	SYM; R10	SYM; R11	SYM; R12	HID; R13	HID; R14	HID; R15	TOW; R16	TOW; R17	SMP; R18	SMP; R19	BEN; R20	BEN; R21	BEN; R22	SAN; R23; 14	BAT; R24; 7	SUR; R25	SUR; R26	ADE; R27	ADE; R28												34th	318
2024	Brad Jones Racing	12	Chevrolet Camaro ZL1	BAT1; R1	BAT1; R2	MEL; R3	MEL; R4	MEL; R5	MEL; R6	TAU; R7	TAU; R8	BAR; R9	BAR; R10	HID; R11	HID; R12	TOW; R13	TOW; R14	SMP; R15	SMP; R16	BEN; R17	BEN; R18	SAN; R19; 22	BAT; R20; 20	SUR; R21	SUR; R22	ADE; R23	ADE; R24																50th	168

=== Complete Bathurst 1000 results ===
Year	Team	Car	Co-driver	Position	Laps
2009	Triple F Racing	Holden Commodore VE	(Australia) Troy Bayliss	DNF	59
2010	Triple F Racing	Ford Falcon FG	(Australia) Michael Patrizi	DNF	56
2011	Triple F Racing	Ford Falcon FG	(Australia) Michael Patrizi	20th	160
2012	Triple F Racing	Ford Falcon FG	(New Zealand) Matthew Halliday	22nd	147
2013	Lucas Dumbrell Motorsport	Holden Commodore VF	(New Zealand) Matthew Halliday	DNF	145
2014	Nissan Motorsport	Nissan Altima L33	(Australia) Michael Caruso	15th	158
2015	Nissan Motorsport	Nissan Altima L33	(Australia) Michael Caruso	13th	161
2016	Nissan Motorsport	Nissan Altima L33	(Australia) Michael Caruso	8th	161
2017	Nissan Motorsport	Nissan Altima L33	(Australia) Michael Caruso	6th	161
2018	Nissan Motorsport	Nissan Altima L33	(Australia) Michael Caruso	DNF	69
2019	Kelly Racing	Nissan Altima L33	(Australia) Garry Jacobson	19th	159
2020	Charlie Schwerkolt Racing	Holden Commodore ZB	(Australia) Scott Pye	6th	161
2021	Brad Jones Racing	Holden Commodore ZB	(Australia) Todd Hazelwood	8th	161
2022	Brad Jones Racing	Holden Commodore ZB	(Australia) Bryce Fullwood	9th	161
2023	Brad Jones Racing	Chevrolet Camaro Mk.6	(Australia) Bryce Fullwood	7th	161
2024	Brad Jones Racing	Chevrolet Camaro Mk.6	(New Zealand) Jaxon Evans	20th	161
