= 2009 Sandown Challenge =

2009 Supercar Championship event

(Victoria (state)) 2009 Sandown Challenge
Event Information
- Round 7 of 14 in the 2009 V8 Supercar Championship Series
- Date: 31 July–2 August 2009
- Location: Melbourne, Victoria
- Venue: Sandown International Raceway
- Weather: Fine

Results
Race 1
Distance	33 laps	100 km
Pole position	Will Davison; Holden Racing Team	1:09.7185
Winner	Will Davison; Holden Racing Team	39:34.9720
Race 2
Distance	65 laps	200 km
Pole position	Will Davison; Holden Racing Team	1:09.7472
Winner	Garth Tander; Holden Racing Team	1:27:49.5475

The 2009 Sandown Challenge (known for naming rights reasons as the 2009 Norton 360 Sandown Challenge) was the seventh round of the 2009 V8 Supercar Championship Series. It was the 33rd ATCC/V8 Supercar event to be held at Sandown Raceway in the sprint format and was held on the weekend of 31 July to 2 August in Melbourne, Victoria.

The weekend was dominated by the Holden Racing Team outfit with Will Davison claiming pole position for the first race and leading a lights-to-flag victory for the team. Davison would also claim pole position for the second race, but it would be teammate Garth Tander who would take victory that day with Davison close behind.

== Background ==
The event was held on the weekend of 31 July to 2 August 2009. It was the 33rd ATCC/V8 Supercar event to be held at Sandown Raceway, and consisted of one 100 kilometre race held as Race 13 on Saturday, with a 200 kilometre race held on Sunday as Race 14.

=== Entry list ===
There were 29 drivers entered into this event. 18 drivers would compete in a VE Holden Commodore while ten drivers would utilise the FG Ford Falcon and one, Michael Patrizi of Paul Cruickshank Racing, would remain with the BF Ford Falcon.

=== Support categories ===
Category	Races	Round winner
Fujitsu V8 Supercar Series	3	(Australia) David Russell (Ford Falcon (BA))
Australian V8 Ute Racing Series	3	(Australia) Kim Jane (Holden Commodore VE Ute)
Australian Formula Ford Championship	3	(Australia) Scott Pye (Spectrum 011d)
Australian Mini Challenge	3	(Australia) Nathan Caratti (MINI Cooper S JCWR56)

== Race report ==
=== Race 13 ===
==== Qualifying ====
Pos	No	Name	Team	Vehicle	Qual 1	Qual 2
1	1	(Australia) Jamie Whincup	Triple Eight Race Engineering	Ford Falcon (FG)		1:09.6670
2	17	(Australia) Steven Johnson	Dick Johnson Racing	Ford Falcon (FG)		1:09.7273
3	7	(Australia) Todd Kelly	Kelly Racing	Holden Commodore (VE)		1:09.7552
4	18	(Australia) James Courtney	Dick Johnson Racing	Ford Falcon (FG)		1:09.7749
5	22	(Australia) Will Davison	Holden Racing Team	Holden Commodore (VE)		1:09.8422
6	888	(Australia) Craig Lowndes	Triple Eight Race Engineering	Ford Falcon (FG)		1:09.8673
7	111	(New Zealand) Fabian Coulthard	Paul Cruickshank Racing	Ford Falcon (FG)		1:09.8991
8	39	(Australia) Russell Ingall	Paul Morris Motorsport	Holden Commodore (VE)		1:09.9908
9	9	(New Zealand) Shane van Gisbergen	Stone Brothers Racing	Ford Falcon (FG)		1:10.0029
10	34	(Australia) Michael Caruso	Garry Rogers Motorsport	Holden Commodore (VE)		1:10.0059
11	5	(Australia) Mark Winterbottom	Ford Performance Racing	Ford Falcon (FG)		1:10.0382
12	15	(Australia) Rick Kelly	Kelly Racing	Holden Commodore (VE)		1:10.0448
13	6	(New Zealand) Steven Richards	Ford Performance Racing	Ford Falcon (FG)		1:10.0499
14	4	(Australia) Alex Davison	Stone Brothers Racing	Ford Falcon (FG)		1:10.1485
15	25	(Australia) Jason Bright	Britek Motorsport	Ford Falcon (FG)		1:10.1519
16	11	(Australia) Jack Perkins	Kelly Racing	Holden Commodore (VE)		1:10.1745
17	24	(Australia) David Reynolds	Walkinshaw Racing	Holden Commodore (VE)		1:10.2239
18	3	(Australia) Jason Bargwanna	Tasman Motorsport	Holden Commodore (VE)		1:10.3011
19	8	(New Zealand) Jason Richards	Brad Jones Racing	Holden Commodore (VE)		1:10.3061
20	51	(New Zealand) Greg Murphy	Tasman Motorsport	Holden Commodore (VE)		1:10.4295
21	33	(Australia) Lee Holdsworth	Garry Rogers Motorsport	Holden Commodore (VE)	1:10.5633	—N/a
22	67	(Australia) Tim Slade	Paul Morris Motorsport	Holden Commodore (VE)	1:10.6105	—N/a
23	10	(Australia) Paul Dumbrell	Walkinshaw Racing	Holden Commodore (VE)	1:10.6444	—N/a
24	333	(Australia) Michael Patrizi	Paul Cruickshank Racing	Ford Falcon (BF)	1:10.7662	—N/a
25	14	(Australia) Cameron McConville	Brad Jones Racing	Holden Commodore (VE)	1:10.7835	—N/a
26	55	(Australia) Tony D'Alberto	Rod Nash Racing	Holden Commodore (VE)	1:10.8458	—N/a
27	2	(Australia) Garth Tander	Holden Racing Team	Holden Commodore (VE)	1:11.0816	—N/a
28	12	(Australia) Dean Fiore	Triple F Racing	Holden Commodore (VE)	1:11.1542	—N/a
29	16	(Australia) Mark McNally	Kelly Racing	Holden Commodore (VE)	1:11.5872	—N/a

==== Top ten shootout ====
Pos	No	Name	Team	Vehicle	Time
1	22	(Australia) Will Davison	Holden Racing Team	Holden Commodore (VE)	1:09.7185
2	1	(Australia) Jamie Whincup	Triple Eight Race Engineering	Ford Falcon (FG)	1:10.1085
3	17	(Australia) Steven Johnson	Dick Johnson Racing	Ford Falcon (FG)	1:10.2992
4	18	(Australia) James Courtney	Dick Johnson Racing	Ford Falcon (FG)	1:10.3040
5	111	(New Zealand) Fabian Coulthard	Paul Cruickshank Racing	Ford Falcon (FG)	1:10.3138
6	888	(Australia) Craig Lowndes	Triple Eight Race Engineering	Ford Falcon (FG)	1:10.3181
7	9	(New Zealand) Shane van Gisbergen	Stone Brothers Racing	Ford Falcon (FG)	1:10.3325
8	34	(Australia) Michael Caruso	Garry Rogers Motorsport	Holden Commodore (VE)	1:10.4352
9	39	(Australia) Russell Ingall	Paul Morris Motorsport	Holden Commodore (VE)	1:10.7648
10	7	(Australia) Todd Kelly	Kelly Racing	Holden Commodore (VE)	1:10.7682

==== Race ====
Pos	No	Name	Team	Vehicle	Laps	Time/Retired	Grid
1	22	(Australia) Will Davison	Holden Racing Team	Holden Commodore (VE)	33	39:34.9720	1
2	18	(Australia) James Courtney	Dick Johnson Racing	Ford Falcon (FG)	33	+ 6.420	4
3	888	(Australia) Craig Lowndes	Triple Eight Race Engineering	Ford Falcon (FG)	33	+ 7.480	6
4	7	(Australia) Todd Kelly	Kelly Racing	Holden Commodore (VE)	33	+ 18.362	10
5	34	(Australia) Michael Caruso	Garry Rogers Motorsport	Holden Commodore (VE)	33	+ 18.777	8
6	1	(Australia) Jamie Whincup	Triple Eight Race Engineering	Ford Falcon (FG)	33	+ 19.104	2
7	39	(Australia) Russell Ingall	Paul Morris Motorsport	Holden Commodore (VE)	33	+ 19.454	9
8	17	(Australia) Steven Johnson	Dick Johnson Racing	Ford Falcon (FG)	33	+ 24.920	3
9	24	(Australia) David Reynolds	Walkinshaw Racing	Holden Commodore (VE)	33	+ 25.536	17
10	111	(New Zealand) Fabian Coulthard	Paul Cruickshank Racing	Ford Falcon (FG)	33	+ 27.624	5
11	51	(New Zealand) Greg Murphy	Tasman Motorsport	Holden Commodore (VE)	33	+ 30.991	20
12	5	(Australia) Mark Winterbottom	Ford Performance Racing	Ford Falcon (FG)	33	+ 32.625	11
13	11	(Australia) Jack Perkins	Kelly Racing	Holden Commodore (VE)	33	+ 40.085	16
14	6	(New Zealand) Steven Richards	Ford Performance Racing	Ford Falcon (FG)	33	+ 46.963	13
15	9	(New Zealand) Shane van Gisbergen	Stone Brothers Racing	Ford Falcon (FG)	33	+ 47.833	7
16	4	(Australia) Alex Davison	Stone Brothers Racing	Ford Falcon (FG)	33	+ 48.360	14
17	2	(Australia) Garth Tander	Holden Racing Team	Holden Commodore (VE)	33	+ 51.023	27
18	33	(Australia) Lee Holdsworth	Garry Rogers Motorsport	Holden Commodore (VE)	33	+ 51.096	21
19	8	(New Zealand) Jason Richards	Brad Jones Racing	Holden Commodore (VE)	33	+ 51.234	19
20	3	(Australia) Jason Bargwanna	Tasman Motorsport	Holden Commodore (VE)	33	+ 53.743	18
21	67	(Australia) Tim Slade	Paul Morris Motorsport	Holden Commodore (VE)	33	+ 59.280	22
22	14	(Australia) Cameron McConville	Brad Jones Racing	Holden Commodore (VE)	33	+ 1:03.571	25
23	10	(Australia) Paul Dumbrell	Walkinshaw Racing	Holden Commodore (VE)	32	+ 1 lap	23
24	15	(Australia) Rick Kelly	Kelly Racing	Holden Commodore (VE)	32	+ 1 lap	12
25	12	(Australia) Dean Fiore	Triple F Racing	Holden Commodore (VE)	32	+ 1 lap	28
26	16	(Australia) Mark McNally	Kelly Racing	Holden Commodore (VE)	32	+ 1 lap	29
Ret	25	(Australia) Jason Bright	Britek Motorsport	Ford Falcon (FG)	28	Retired	15
Ret	333	(Australia) Michael Patrizi	Paul Cruickshank Racing	Ford Falcon (BF)	27	Retired	24
DNS	55	(Australia) Tony D'Alberto	Rod Nash Racing	Holden Commodore (VE)		Did not start	
Fastest Lap: Will Davison (Holden Racing Team) - 1:10.0743 on lap 4

=== Race 14 ===
==== Qualifying ====
Pos	No	Name	Team	Vehicle	Time
1	22	(Australia) Will Davison	Holden Racing Team	Holden Commodore (VE)	1:09.7472
2	18	(Australia) James Courtney	Dick Johnson Racing	Ford Falcon (FG)	1:09.8677
3	17	(Australia) Steven Johnson	Dick Johnson Racing	Ford Falcon (FG)	1:09.9279
4	15	(Australia) Rick Kelly	Kelly Racing	Holden Commodore (VE)	1:09.9397
5	111	(New Zealand) Fabian Coulthard	Paul Cruickshank Racing	Ford Falcon (FG)	1:09.9407
6	2	(Australia) Garth Tander	Holden Racing Team	Holden Commodore (VE)	1:09.9818
7	33	(Australia) Lee Holdsworth	Garry Rogers Motorsport	Holden Commodore (VE)	1:09.9876
8	34	(Australia) Michael Caruso	Garry Rogers Motorsport	Holden Commodore (VE)	1:09.9967
9	1	(Australia) Jamie Whincup	Triple Eight Race Engineering	Ford Falcon (FG)	1:09.9972
10	51	(New Zealand) Greg Murphy	Tasman Motorsport	Holden Commodore (VE)	1:10.0508
11	7	(Australia) Todd Kelly	Kelly Racing	Holden Commodore (VE)	1:10.0884
12	888	(Australia) Craig Lowndes	Triple Eight Race Engineering	Ford Falcon (FG)	1:10.0930
13	3	(Australia) Jason Bargwanna	Tasman Motorsport	Holden Commodore (VE)	1:10.1278
14	11	(Australia) Jack Perkins	Kelly Racing	Holden Commodore (VE)	1:10.1517
15	5	(Australia) Mark Winterbottom	Ford Performance Racing	Ford Falcon (FG)	1:10.1698
16	6	(New Zealand) Steven Richards	Ford Performance Racing	Ford Falcon (FG)	1:10.1921
17	67	(Australia) Tim Slade	Paul Morris Motorsport	Holden Commodore (VE)	1:10.2136
18	4	(Australia) Alex Davison	Stone Brothers Racing	Ford Falcon (FG)	1:10.2277
19	55	(Australia) Tony D'Alberto	Rod Nash Racing	Holden Commodore (VE)	1:10.2581
20	10	(Australia) Paul Dumbrell	Walkinshaw Racing	Holden Commodore (VE)	1:10.2635
21	8	(New Zealand) Jason Richards	Brad Jones Racing	Holden Commodore (VE)	1:10.2814
22	24	(Australia) David Reynolds	Walkinshaw Racing	Holden Commodore (VE)	1:10.3594
23	39	(Australia) Russell Ingall	Paul Morris Motorsport	Holden Commodore (VE)	1:10.4048
24	9	(New Zealand) Shane van Gisbergen	Stone Brothers Racing	Ford Falcon (FG)	1:10.4112
25	25	(Australia) Jason Bright	Britek Motorsport	Ford Falcon (FG)	1:10.4188
26	14	(Australia) Cameron McConville	Brad Jones Racing	Holden Commodore (VE)	1:10.8126
27	333	(Australia) Michael Patrizi	Paul Cruickshank Racing	Ford Falcon (BF)	1:10.8526
28	12	(Australia) Dean Fiore	Triple F Racing	Holden Commodore (VE)	1:11.0936
29	16	(Australia) Mark McNally	Kelly Racing	Holden Commodore (VE)	1:11.5833

==== Race ====
Pos	No	Name	Team	Vehicle	Laps	Time/Retired	Grid
1	2	(Australia) Garth Tander	Holden Racing Team	Holden Commodore (VE)	65	01:27:49.5475	6
2	22	(Australia) Will Davison	Holden Racing Team	Holden Commodore (VE)	65	+ 0.350	1
3	1	(Australia) Jamie Whincup	Triple Eight Race Engineering	Ford Falcon (FG)	65	+ 7.050	9
4	14	(Australia) Cameron McConville	Brad Jones Racing	Holden Commodore (VE)	65	+ 10.072	26
5	888	(Australia) Craig Lowndes	Triple Eight Race Engineering	Ford Falcon (FG)	65	+ 11.788	12
6	8	(New Zealand) Jason Richards	Brad Jones Racing	Holden Commodore (VE)	65	+ 12.880	21
7	55	(Australia) Tony D'Alberto	Rod Nash Racing	Holden Commodore (VE)	65	+ 13.966	19
8	18	(Australia) James Courtney	Dick Johnson Racing	Ford Falcon (FG)	65	+ 16.600	2
9	3	(Australia) Jason Bargwanna	Tasman Motorsport	Holden Commodore (VE)	65	+ 19.941	13
10	10	(Australia) Paul Dumbrell	Walkinshaw Racing	Holden Commodore (VE)	65	+ 20.587	20
11	33	(Australia) Lee Holdsworth	Garry Rogers Motorsport	Holden Commodore (VE)	65	+ 23.532	7
12	6	(New Zealand) Steven Richards	Ford Performance Racing	Ford Falcon (FG)	65	+ 26.485	16
13	15	(Australia) Rick Kelly	Kelly Racing	Holden Commodore (VE)	65	+ 26.653	4
14	39	(Australia) Russell Ingall	Paul Morris Motorsport	Holden Commodore (VE)	65	+ 28.491	23
15	111	(New Zealand) Fabian Coulthard	Paul Cruickshank Racing	Ford Falcon (FG)	65	+ 29.073	5
16	5	(Australia) Mark Winterbottom	Ford Performance Racing	Ford Falcon (FG)	65	+ 29.076	15
17	17	(Australia) Steven Johnson	Dick Johnson Racing	Ford Falcon (FG)	65	+ 35.568	3
18	7	(Australia) Todd Kelly	Kelly Racing	Holden Commodore (VE)	65	+ 35.936	11
19	25	(Australia) Jason Bright	Britek Motorsport	Ford Falcon (FG)	65	+ 36.871	25
20	34	(Australia) Michael Caruso	Garry Rogers Motorsport	Holden Commodore (VE)	65	+ 37.258	8
21	4	(Australia) Alex Davison	Stone Brothers Racing	Ford Falcon (FG)	65	+ 39.754	18
22	333	(Australia) Michael Patrizi	Paul Cruickshank Racing	Ford Falcon (BF)	65	+ 50.945	27
23	51	(New Zealand) Greg Murphy	Tasman Motorsport	Holden Commodore (VE)	62	+ 3 laps	10
24	67	(Australia) Tim Slade	Paul Morris Motorsport	Holden Commodore (VE)	60	+ 5 laps	17
Ret	11	(Australia) Jack Perkins	Kelly Racing	Holden Commodore (VE)	41	Retired	14
Ret	12	(Australia) Dean Fiore	Triple F Racing	Holden Commodore (VE)	34	Retired	28
Ret	16	(Australia) Mark McNally	Kelly Racing	Holden Commodore (VE)	7	Retired	29
Ret	24	(Australia) David Reynolds	Walkinshaw Racing	Holden Commodore (VE)	2	Retired	22
Ret	9	(New Zealand) Shane van Gisbergen	Stone Brothers Racing	Ford Falcon (FG)	1	Retired	24
Fastest Lap: Garth Tander (Holden Racing Team) - 1:09.8573 on lap 4
