= 2009 Townsville 400 =

Automotive race

(Queensland) 2009 Dunlop Townsville 400
Event Information
- Round 6 of 14 in the 2009 V8 Supercar Championship Series
- Date: 10–12 July 2009
- Location: Townsville, Queensland
- Venue: Reid Park Street Circuit
- Weather: Fine

Results
Race 1
Distance	71 laps	202 km
Pole position	Lee Holdsworth; Garry Rogers Motorsport	1:12.7327
Winner	Jamie Whincup; Triple Eight Race Engineering	1:35:37.4475
Race 2
Distance	72 laps	205 km
Pole position	Garth Tander; Holden Racing Team	1:12.4700
Winner	James Courtney; Dick Johnson Racing	1:35:03.3900

The 2009 Townsville 400 (known for naming rights reasons as the 2009 Dunlop Townsville 400) was the sixth round of the 2009 V8 Supercar Championship Series. It was the inaugural V8 Supercar event to be held on the Reid Park Street Circuit and was held on the weekend of 10 to 12 July in Townsville, Queensland.

Lee Holdsworth of Garry Rogers Motorsport secured an emphatic pole position for the first race. However, he would be unable to prevent Jamie Whincup from claiming his eighth win of the season ahead of the Holden Racing Team contingent of Will Davison and Garth Tander despite a discrepancy over the final lap due to time-certainty ruling. Tander would claim pole position for the Sunday race but would ultimately have to settle for third place as James Courtney secured his first victory for Dick Johnson Racing.

== New event ==
The 2009 Townsville 400 is the inaugural running of this race. The first time a major motorsport has been held in North Queensland, the race has been assembled around a specially created street circuit, as no permanent racing facilities exist in north Queensland, apart from clay surface speedway circuits. Apart from Speedway racing, the largest event previously held in this part of Australia have been rounds of the Queensland Rally Championship.

The race will follow V8 Supercar's most familiar street circuit format with two races evenly split over the Saturday and Sunday of the event. Similar to the Hamilton 400 event the races will be 200 kilometres in length, rather than those of the Adelaide 500 which are 250 kilometres long.

The 2.85 kilometre Townsville Street Circuit becomes the sixth race track in Queensland to host a round of the Australian Touring Car Championship (of which the V8 Supercars form a part of its history), following Lowood circuit, Lakeside Raceway, Surfers Paradise Raceway, Queensland Raceway and most recently the Surfers Paradise Street Circuit.

The race also represents an important litmus test for V8 Supercar, as this is the second time they have attempted to grow a street race event in a region where motor racing had not previously had a following, after the failure of the Canberra 400.

== Changes ==
Mark McNally makes his V8 Supercar series debut, replacing Dale Wood in the #16 Kelly Racing Holden Commodore. Wood remains with the team, although it has not yet been confirmed that Wood will form part of the team's endurance racing squad.

Jason Bright debuts his new race car, the first built by his new team. Stone Brothers Racing. The Ford FG Falcon replaces the Ford BF Falcon that Bright brought to the team from his former team, Britek Motorsport. The only drivers left in the series still running the older BF Falcons now are PCR's Michael Patrizi and the car of Marcus Marshall whose proposed sale of the team to Grant Sherrin of Sherrin Motorsport fell through since the previous round of the series at Hidden Valley Raceway.

== Results ==
=== Race 11 ===
==== Qualifying ====
Pos	No	Name	Team	Vehicle	Qual 1	Qual 2
1	18	(Australia) James Courtney	Dick Johnson Racing	Ford Falcon (FG)		1:12.4747
2	1	(Australia) Jamie Whincup	Triple Eight Race Engineering	Ford Falcon (FG)		1:12.6426
3	111	(New Zealand) Fabian Coulthard	Paul Cruickshank Racing	Ford Falcon (FG)		1:12.8161
4	2	(Australia) Garth Tander	Holden Racing Team	Holden Commodore (VE)		1:12.8248
5	9	(New Zealand) Shane van Gisbergen	Stone Brothers Racing	Ford Falcon (FG)		1:12.8251
6	34	(Australia) Michael Caruso	Garry Rogers Motorsport	Holden Commodore (VE)		1:12.8374
7	17	(Australia) Steven Johnson	Dick Johnson Racing	Ford Falcon (FG)		1:12.8520
8	33	(Australia) Lee Holdsworth	Garry Rogers Motorsport	Holden Commodore (VE)		1:12.8635
9	22	(Australia) Will Davison	Holden Racing Team	Holden Commodore (VE)		1:12.9526
10	8	(New Zealand) Jason Richards	Brad Jones Racing	Holden Commodore (VE)		1:12.9893
11	24	(Australia) David Reynolds	Walkinshaw Racing	Holden Commodore (VE)		1:13.0255
12	10	(Australia) Paul Dumbrell	Walkinshaw Racing	Holden Commodore (VE)		1:13.0260
13	14	(Australia) Cameron McConville	Brad Jones Racing	Holden Commodore (VE)		1:13.0533
14	39	(Australia) Russell Ingall	Paul Morris Motorsport	Holden Commodore (VE)		1:13.0584
15	888	(Australia) Craig Lowndes	Triple Eight Race Engineering	Ford Falcon (FG)		1:13.1465
16	5	(Australia) Mark Winterbottom	Ford Performance Racing	Ford Falcon (FG)		1:13.2002
17	7	(Australia) Todd Kelly	Kelly Racing	Holden Commodore (VE)		1:13.4012
18	333	(Australia) Michael Patrizi	Paul Cruickshank Racing	Ford Falcon (BF)		1:13.4232
19	15	(Australia) Rick Kelly	Kelly Racing	Holden Commodore (VE)		1:13.5178
20	3	(Australia) Jason Bargwanna	Tasman Motorsport	Holden Commodore (VE)		1:13.5230
21	6	(New Zealand) Steven Richards	Ford Performance Racing	Ford Falcon (FG)	1:13.5088	—N/a
22	55	(Australia) Tony D'Alberto	Rod Nash Racing	Holden Commodore (VE)	1:13.5341	—N/a
23	67	(Australia) Tim Slade	Paul Morris Motorsport	Holden Commodore (VE)	1:13.5438	—N/a
24	4	(Australia) Alex Davison	Stone Brothers Racing	Ford Falcon (FG)	1:13.7166	—N/a
25	11	(Australia) Jack Perkins	Kelly Racing	Holden Commodore (VE)	1:13.7420	—N/a
26	51	(New Zealand) Greg Murphy	Tasman Motorsport	Holden Commodore (VE)	1:13.7738	—N/a
27	25	(Australia) Jason Bright	Britek Motorsport	Ford Falcon (FG)	1:13.7867	—N/a
28	12	(Australia) Dean Fiore	Triple F Racing	Holden Commodore (VE)	1:13.8292	—N/a
29	16	(Australia) Mark McNally	Kelly Racing	Holden Commodore (VE)	1:14.9106	—N/a

==== Top ten shootout ====
Pos	No	Name	Team	Car	Time
1	33	(Australia) Lee Holdsworth	Garry Rogers Motorsport	Holden Commodore (VE)	1:12.7327
2	18	(Australia) James Courtney	Dick Johnson Racing	Ford Falcon (FG)	1:12.8082
3	2	(Australia) Garth Tander	Holden Racing Team	Holden Commodore (VE)	1:12.8263
4	34	(Australia) Michael Caruso	Garry Rogers Motorsport	Holden Commodore (VE)	1:12.8977
5	22	(Australia) Will Davison	Holden Racing Team	Holden Commodore (VE)	1:12.9407
6	8	(New Zealand) Jason Richards	Brad Jones Racing	Holden Commodore (VE)	1:13.0736
7	9	(New Zealand) Shane van Gisbergen	Stone Brothers Racing	Ford Falcon (FG)	1:13.0858
8	17	(Australia) Steven Johnson	Dick Johnson Racing	Ford Falcon (FG)	1:13.2687
9	1	(Australia) Jamie Whincup	Triple Eight Race Engineering	Ford Falcon (FG)	1:13.3629
10	111	(New Zealand) Fabian Coulthard	Paul Cruickshank Racing	Ford Falcon (BF)	1:13.6079

==== Race ====
Pos	No	Name	Team	Vehicle	Laps	Time/Retired	Grid	Points
1	1	(Australia) Jamie Whincup	Triple Eight Race Engineering	Ford Falcon (FG)	71	01:35:37.4475	9	150
2	22	(Australia) Will Davison	Holden Racing Team	Holden Commodore (VE)	71	+ 1.449	5	138
3	2	(Australia) Garth Tander	Holden Racing Team	Holden Commodore (VE)	71	+ 1.746	3	129
4	888	(Australia) Craig Lowndes	Triple Eight Race Engineering	Ford Falcon (FG)	71	+ 3.043	15	120
5	34	(Australia) Michael Caruso	Garry Rogers Motorsport	Holden Commodore (VE)	71	+ 4.422	5	111
6	39	(Australia) Russell Ingall	Paul Morris Motorsport	Holden Commodore (VE)	71	+ 4.831	4	102
7	15	(Australia) Rick Kelly	Kelly Racing	Holden Commodore (VE)	71	+ 9.537	19	96
8	5	(Australia) Mark Winterbottom	Ford Performance Racing	Ford Falcon (FG)	71	+ 9.785	16	90
9	14	(Australia) Cameron McConville	Brad Jones Racing	Holden Commodore (VE)	71	+ 10.048	13	84
10	7	(Australia) Todd Kelly	Kelly Racing	Holden Commodore (VE)	71	+ 10.237	17	78
11	10	(Australia) Paul Dumbrell	Walkinshaw Racing	Holden Commodore (VE)	71	+ 10.729	12	72
12	9	(New Zealand) Shane van Gisbergen	Stone Brothers Racing	Ford Falcon (FG)	71	+ 11.023	7	69
13	17	(Australia) Steven Johnson	Dick Johnson Racing	Ford Falcon (FG)	71	+ 11.312	8	66
14	3	(Australia) Jason Bargwanna	Tasman Motorsport	Holden Commodore (VE)	71	+ 12.904	20	63
15	111	(New Zealand) Fabian Coulthard	Paul Cruickshank Racing	Ford Falcon (FG)	70	+ 1 lap	10	60
16	25	(Australia) Jason Bright	Britek Motorsport	Ford Falcon (FG)	70	+ 1 lap	27	57
17	12	(Australia) Dean Fiore	Triple F Racing	Holden Commodore (VE)	70	+ 1 lap	15	54
18	11	(Australia) Jack Perkins	Kelly Racing	Holden Commodore (VE)	70	+ 1 lap	25	51
19	51	(New Zealand) Greg Murphy	Tasman Motorsport	Holden Commodore (VE)	69	+ 2 laps	26	48
20	333	(Australia) Michael Patrizi	Paul Cruickshank Racing	Ford Falcon (BF)	69	+ 2 laps	18	45
21	6	(New Zealand) Steven Richards	Ford Performance Racing	Ford Falcon (FG)	68	+ 3 laps	21	42
22	24	(Australia) David Reynolds	Walkinshaw Racing	Holden Commodore (VE)	66	+ 5 laps	11	39
23	8	(New Zealand) Jason Richards	Brad Jones Racing	Holden Commodore (VE)	60	+ 11 laps	6	36
24	16	(Australia) Mark McNally	Kelly Racing	Holden Commodore (VE)	60	+ 11 laps	29	33
Ret	55	(Australia) Tony D'Alberto	Rod Nash Racing	Holden Commodore (VE)	67	Retired	22	
Ret	4	(Australia) Alex Davison	Stone Brothers Racing	Ford Falcon (FG)	60	Retired	24	
Ret	67	(Australia) Tim Slade	Paul Morris Motorsport	Holden Commodore (VE)	42	Retired	3	
Ret	33	(Australia) Lee Holdsworth	Garry Rogers Motorsport	Holden Commodore (VE)	28	Retired	1	
Ret	18	(Australia) James Courtney	Dick Johnson Racing	Ford Falcon (FG)	5	Engine	2	
Fastest Lap: Lee Holdsworth (Garry Rogers Motorsport) - 1:13.4727 on lap 24

=== Race 12 ===
==== Qualifying ====
Pos	No	Name	Team	Vehicle	Time
1	2	(Australia) Garth Tander	Holden Racing Team	Holden Commodore (VE)	1:12.4700
2	22	(Australia) Will Davison	Holden Racing Team	Holden Commodore (VE)	1:12.6938
3	1	(Australia) Jamie Whincup	Triple Eight Race Engineering	Ford Falcon (FG)	1:12.7246
4	18	(Australia) James Courtney	Dick Johnson Racing	Ford Falcon (FG)	1:12.7420
5	5	(Australia) Mark Winterbottom	Ford Performance Racing	Ford Falcon (FG)	1:12.8184
6	34	(Australia) Michael Caruso	Garry Rogers Motorsport	Holden Commodore (VE)	1:12.8431
7	9	(New Zealand) Shane van Gisbergen	Stone Brothers Racing	Ford Falcon (FG)	1:12.8586
8	25	(Australia) Jason Bright	Britek Motorsport	Ford Falcon (BF)	1:12.9594
9	888	(Australia) Craig Lowndes	Triple Eight Race Engineering	Ford Falcon (FG)	1:13.0282
10	111	(New Zealand) Fabian Coulthard	Paul Cruickshank Racing	Ford Falcon (FG)	1:13.0920
11	24	(Australia) David Reynolds	Walkinshaw Racing	Holden Commodore (VE)	1:13.1034
12	15	(Australia) Rick Kelly	Kelly Racing	Holden Commodore (VE)	1:13.1178
13	33	(Australia) Lee Holdsworth	Garry Rogers Motorsport	Holden Commodore (VE)	1:13.1198
14	14	(Australia) Cameron McConville	Brad Jones Racing	Holden Commodore (VE)	1:13.1680
15	3	(Australia) Jason Bargwanna	Tasman Motorsport	Holden Commodore (VE)	1:13.2148
16	55	(Australia) Tony D'Alberto	Rod Nash Racing	Holden Commodore (VE)	1:13.2262
17	39	(Australia) Russell Ingall	Paul Morris Motorsport	Holden Commodore (VE)	1:13.2324
18	4	(Australia) Alex Davison	Stone Brothers Racing	Ford Falcon (FG)	1:13.3043
19	10	(Australia) Paul Dumbrell	Walkinshaw Racing	Holden Commodore (VE)	1:13.3267
20	7	(Australia) Todd Kelly	Kelly Racing	Holden Commodore (VE)	1:13.3337
21	8	(New Zealand) Jason Richards	Brad Jones Racing	Holden Commodore (VE)	1:13.3731
22	17	(Australia) Steven Johnson	Dick Johnson Racing	Ford Falcon (FG)	1:13.3776
23	51	(New Zealand) Greg Murphy	Tasman Motorsport	Holden Commodore (VE)	1:13.3961
24	6	(New Zealand) Steven Richards	Ford Performance Racing	Ford Falcon (FG)	1:13.4248
25	67	(Australia) Tim Slade	Paul Morris Motorsport	Holden Commodore (VE)	1:13.5697
26	11	(Australia) Jack Perkins	Kelly Racing	Holden Commodore (VE)	1:13.8180
27	333	(Australia) Michael Patrizi	Paul Cruickshank Racing	Ford Falcon (BF)	1:13.8628
28	12	(Australia) Dean Fiore	Triple F Racing	Holden Commodore (VE)	1:14.1499
29	16	(Australia) Mark McNally	Kelly Racing	Holden Commodore (VE)	1:15.1524

==== Race ====
Pos	No.	Name	Team	Vehicle	Laps	Time/Retired	Grid
1	18	(Australia) James Courtney	Dick Johnson Racing	Ford Falcon (FG)	72	01:35:03.3900	4
2	1	(Australia) Jamie Whincup	Triple Eight Race Engineering	Ford Falcon (FG)	72	+ 0.907	3
3	2	(Australia) Garth Tander	Holden Racing Team	Holden Commodore (VE)	72	+ 2.195	1
4	22	(Australia) Will Davison	Holden Racing Team	Holden Commodore (VE)	72	+ 6.212	2
5	17	(Australia) Steven Johnson	Dick Johnson Racing	Ford Falcon (FG)	72	+ 9.054	22
6	5	(Australia) Mark Winterbottom	Ford Performance Racing	Ford Falcon (FG)	72	+ 10.410	5
7	33	(Australia) Lee Holdsworth	Garry Rogers Motorsport	Holden Commodore (VE)	72	+ 10.912	13
8	10	(Australia) Paul Dumbrell	Walkinshaw Racing	Holden Commodore (VE)	72	+ 11.659	19
9	888	(Australia) Craig Lowndes	Triple Eight Race Engineering	Ford Falcon (FG)	72	+ 18.325	9
10	34	(Australia) Michael Caruso	Garry Rogers Motorsport	Holden Commodore (VE)	72	+ 19.206	6
11	14	(Australia) Cameron McConville	Brad Jones Racing	Holden Commodore (VE)	72	+ 20.414	14
12	8	(New Zealand) Jason Richards	Brad Jones Racing	Holden Commodore (VE)	72	+ 23.404	21
13	67	(Australia) Tim Slade	Paul Morris Motorsport	Holden Commodore (VE)	72	+ 27.281	25
14	24	(Australia) David Reynolds	Walkinshaw Racing	Holden Commodore (VE)	72	+ 29.471	11
15	333	(Australia) Michael Patrizi	Paul Cruickshank Racing	Ford Falcon (BF)	72	+ 34.135	27
16	12	(Australia) Dean Fiore	Triple F Racing	Holden Commodore (VE)	72	+ 45.318	28
17	55	(Australia) Tony D'Alberto	Rod Nash Racing	Holden Commodore (VE)	72	+ 1:23.264	16
18	25	(Australia) Jason Bright	Britek Motorsport	Ford Falcon (BF)	71	+ 1 lap	8
19	111	(New Zealand) Fabian Coulthard	Paul Cruickshank Racing	Ford Falcon (FG)	71	+ 1 lap	10
20	6	(New Zealand) Steven Richards	Ford Performance Racing	Ford Falcon (FG)	71	+ 1 lap	24
21	16	(Australia) Mark McNally	Kelly Racing	Holden Commodore (VE)	70	+ 2 laps	29
22	11	(Australia) Jack Perkins	Kelly Racing	Holden Commodore (VE)	66	+ 6 laps	26
Ret	51	(New Zealand) Greg Murphy	Tasman Motorsport	Holden Commodore (VE)	71	Retired	23
Ret	39	(Australia) Russell Ingall	Paul Morris Motorsport	Holden Commodore (VE)	70	Retired	17
Ret	15	(Australia) Rick Kelly	Kelly Racing	Holden Commodore (VE)	66	Retired	12
Ret	7	(Australia) Todd Kelly	Kelly Racing	Holden Commodore (VE)	40	Retired	20
Ret	3	(Australia) Jason Bargwanna	Tasman Motorsport	Holden Commodore (VE)	43	Retired	15
Ret	9	(New Zealand) Shane van Gisbergen	Stone Brothers Racing	Ford Falcon (FG)	13	Retired	7
Ret	4	(Australia) Alex Davison	Stone Brothers Racing	Ford Falcon (FG)	12	Retired	18
Fastest Lap: Fabian Coulthard (Paul Cruickshank Racing) - 1:13.4470 on lap 33

== Standings ==
- After round 6 of 14

Pos	No.	Name	Team	Points
1	1	(Australia) Jamie Whincup	Triple Eight Race Engineering	1560
2	22	(Australia) Will Davison	Holden Racing Team	1386
3	2	(Australia) Garth Tander	Holden Racing Team	1212
4	888	(Australia) Craig Lowndes	Triple Eight Race Engineering	1110
5	17	(Australia) Steven Johnson	Dick Johnson Racing	1050
