= 2009 Ipswich 300 =

Eighth race meeting of the 2009 Australian V8 Supercar Championship Series

2009 Queensland House and Land.com 300
Event Information
- Round 8 of 14 in the 2009 V8 Supercar Championship Series
- Date: 21–23 August 2009
- Location: Ipswich, Queensland
- Venue: Queensland Raceway
- Weather: Fine

Results
Race 1
Distance	33 laps	100 km
Pole position	Jamie Whincup; Triple Eight Race Engineering	1:10.8529
Winner	Jamie Whincup; Triple Eight Race Engineering	40:43.7708
Race 2
Distance	65 laps	200 km
Pole position	Mark Winterbottom; Ford Performance Racing	1:10.5290
Winner	Will Davison; Holden Racing Team	1:20:30.0744

The 2009 Ipswich 300 (known for naming rights reasons as the 2009 Queensland House and Land.com 300) was the eighth round of the 2009 V8 Supercar Championship Series. It was the ninth V8 Supercar event to be held at Queensland Raceway and was held on the weekend of 21 to 23 August in Ipswich, Queensland.

Jamie Whincup took his eighth win of the season after leading a lights-to-flag victory in the first race of the weekend. Mark Winterbottom claimed pole position for Sunday's race, but would be trumped to the finish by Will Davison of the Holden Racing Team.

== Background ==
The event was held on the weekend of 21 to 23 August 2009. It was the ninth V8 Supercar event to be held at Queensland Raceway in the sprint format, and consisted of one 100 kilometre race held as Race 15 on Saturday, with a 200 kilometre race held on Sunday as Race 16.

=== Entry list ===
There were 29 drivers entered into this event. 18 drivers would compete in a VE Holden Commodore while ten drivers would utilise the FG Ford Falcon and one, Michael Patrizi of Paul Cruickshank Racing, would remain with the BF Ford Falcon.

=== Support categories ===
Category	Races	Round winner
Fujitsu V8 Supercar Series	3	(Australia) Jonathon Webb (Ford Falcon (BF))
Australian Drivers' Championship	2	(Australia) Tim Macrow (Dallara F307)
Australian Formula Ford Championship	3	(New Zealand) Mitch Evans (Mygale SJ07A)
Touring Car Masters	3	(New Zealand) Jim Richards (Ford Falcon Sprint)
Production Sports Cars	4	(Australia) Roger Lago (Porsche 997 GT3 Cup)

== Race results ==
=== Race 15 ===
==== Qualifying ====
Pos	No	Name	Car	Team	Qual 1	Qual 2
1	25	(Australia) Jason Bright	Britek Motorsport	Ford Falcon (FG)		1:10.7753
2	18	(Australia) James Courtney	Dick Johnson Racing	Ford Falcon (FG)		1:10.8912
3	5	(Australia) Mark Winterbottom	Ford Performance Racing	Ford Falcon (FG)		1:10.9075
4	888	(Australia) Craig Lowndes	Triple Eight Race Engineering	Ford Falcon (FG)		1:10.9631
5	1	(Australia) Jamie Whincup	Triple Eight Race Engineering	Ford Falcon (FG)		1:10.9804
6	111	(New Zealand) Fabian Coulthard	Paul Cruickshank Racing	Ford Falcon (FG)		1:11.0057
7	2	(Australia) Garth Tander	Holden Racing Team	Holden Commodore (VE)		1:11.0162
8	17	(Australia) Steven Johnson	Dick Johnson Racing	Ford Falcon (FG)		1:11.0384
9	9	(New Zealand) Shane van Gisbergen	Stone Brothers Racing	Ford Falcon (FG)		1:11.1231
10	7	(Australia) Todd Kelly	Kelly Racing	Holden Commodore (VE)		1:11.1323
11	33	(Australia) Lee Holdsworth	Garry Rogers Motorsport	Holden Commodore (VE)		1:11.1594
12	4	(Australia) Alex Davison	Stone Brothers Racing	Ford Falcon (FG)		1:11.1628
13	22	(Australia) Will Davison	Holden Racing Team	Holden Commodore (VE)		1:11.1797
14	39	(Australia) Russell Ingall	Paul Morris Motorsport	Holden Commodore (VE)		1:11.2269
15	34	(Australia) Michael Caruso	Garry Rogers Motorsport	Holden Commodore (VE)		1:11.2708
16	6	(New Zealand) Steven Richards	Ford Performance Racing	Ford Falcon (FG)		1:11.2987
17	67	(Australia) Tim Slade	Paul Morris Motorsport	Holden Commodore (VE)		1:11.3086
18	51	(New Zealand) Greg Murphy	Tasman Motorsport	Holden Commodore (VE)		1:11.4373
19	333	(Australia) Michael Patrizi	Paul Cruickshank Racing	Ford Falcon (BF)		1:11.6478
20	3	(Australia) Jason Bargwanna	Tasman Motorsport	Holden Commodore (VE)		1:11.8072
21	5	(Australia) Tony D'Alberto	Rod Nash Racing	Holden Commodore (VE)	1:11.7114	—N/a
22	14	(Australia) Cameron McConville	Brad Jones Racing	Holden Commodore (VE)	1:11.7394	—N/a
23	8	(New Zealand) Jason Richards	Brad Jones Racing	Holden Commodore (VE)	1:11.8350	—N/a
24	11	(Australia) Jack Perkins	Kelly Racing	Holden Commodore (VE)	1:11.8846	—N/a
25	10	(Australia) Paul Dumbrell	Walkinshaw Racing	Holden Commodore (VE)	1:11.8909	—N/a
26	24	(Australia) David Reynolds	Walkinshaw Racing	Holden Commodore (VE)	1:11.9033	—N/a
27	12	(Australia) Dean Fiore	Triple F Racing	Holden Commodore (VE)	1:12.3120	—N/a
28	15	(Australia) Rick Kelly	Kelly Racing	Holden Commodore (VE)	1:12.5234	—N/a
29	16	(Australia) Mark McNally	Kelly Racing	Holden Commodore (VE)	1:12.6775	—N/a

==== Top ten shootout ====
Pos	No	Name	Car	Team	Time
1	1	(Australia) Jamie Whincup	Triple Eight Race Engineering	Ford Falcon (FG)	1:10.8529
2	5	(Australia) Mark Winterbottom	Ford Performance Racing	Ford Falcon (FG)	1:10.8590
3	18	(Australia) James Courtney	Dick Johnson Racing	Ford Falcon (FG)	1:10.9178
4	2	(Australia) Garth Tander	Holden Racing Team	Holden Commodore (VE)	1:10.9715
5	888	(Australia) Craig Lowndes	Triple Eight Race Engineering	Ford Falcon (FG)	1:10.9888
6	17	(Australia) Steven Johnson	Dick Johnson Racing	Ford Falcon (FG)	1:11.0443
7	9	(New Zealand) Shane van Gisbergen	Stone Brothers Racing	Ford Falcon (FG)	1:11.1024
8	111	(New Zealand) Fabian Coulthard	Paul Cruickshank Racing	Ford Falcon (FG)	1:11.2470
9	25	(Australia) Jason Bright	Britek Motorsport	Ford Falcon (FG)	1:11.3434
10	7	(Australia) Todd Kelly	Kelly Racing	Holden Commodore (VE)	1:11.7262

==== Race ====
Pos	No	Name	Team	Vehicle	Laps	Time/Retired	Grid	Points
1	1	(Australia) Jamie Whincup	Triple Eight Race Engineering	Ford Falcon (FG)	33	40:43.7708	1	150
2	18	(Australia) James Courtney	Dick Johnson Racing	Ford Falcon (FG)	33	+ 0.586	3	138
3	5	(Australia) Mark Winterbottom	Ford Performance Racing	Ford Falcon (FG)	33	+ 14.526	2	129
4	17	(Australia) Steven Johnson	Dick Johnson Racing	Ford Falcon (FG)	33	+ 17.245	6	120
5	111	(New Zealand) Fabian Coulthard	Paul Cruickshank Racing	Ford Falcon (FG)	33	+ 18.186	8	111
6	7	(Australia) Todd Kelly	Kelly Racing	Holden Commodore (VE)	33	+ 18.635	10	102
7	33	(Australia) Lee Holdsworth	Garry Rogers Motorsport	Holden Commodore (VE)	33	+ 19.450	11	96
8	25	(Australia) Jason Bright	Britek Motorsport	Ford Falcon (FG)	33	+ 20.601	9	90
9	9	(New Zealand) Shane van Gisbergen	Stone Brothers Racing	Ford Falcon (FG)	33	+ 21.278	7	84
10	67	(Australia) Tim Slade	Paul Morris Motorsport	Holden Commodore (VE)	33	+ 41.974	17	78
11	6	(New Zealand) Steven Richards	Ford Performance Racing	Ford Falcon (FG)	33	+ 43.041	16	72
12	39	(Australia) Russell Ingall	Paul Morris Motorsport	Holden Commodore (VE)	33	+ 45.979	14	69
13	4	(Australia) Alex Davison	Stone Brothers Racing	Ford Falcon (FG)	33	+ 47.114	12	66
14	15	(Australia) Rick Kelly	Kelly Racing	Holden Commodore (VE)	33	+ 47.874	28	63
15	333	(Australia) Michael Patrizi	Paul Cruickshank Racing	Ford Falcon (BF)	33	+ 52.382	19	60
16	55	(Australia) Tony D'Alberto	Rod Nash Racing	Holden Commodore (VE)	33	+ 55.538	21	57
17	51	(New Zealand) Greg Murphy	Tasman Motorsport	Holden Commodore (VE)	33	+ 57.110	18	54
18	3	(Australia) Jason Bargwanna	Tasman Motorsport	Holden Commodore (VE)	33	+ 59.811	20	51
19	34	(Australia) Michael Caruso	Garry Rogers Motorsport	Holden Commodore (VE)	33	+ 1:04.071	15	48
20	24	(Australia) David Reynolds	Walkinshaw Racing	Holden Commodore (VE)	33	+ 1:06.559	26	45
21	8	(New Zealand) Jason Richards	Brad Jones Racing	Holden Commodore (VE)	33	+ 1:06.996	23	42
22	10	(Australia) Paul Dumbrell	Walkinshaw Racing	Holden Commodore (VE)	33	+ 1:07.886	25	39
23	11	(Australia) Jack Perkins	Kelly Racing	Holden Commodore (VE)	33	+ 1:11.318	24	36
24	12	(Australia) Dean Fiore	Triple F Racing	Holden Commodore (VE)	32	+ 1 lap	27	33
25	16	(Australia) Mark McNally	Kelly Racing	Holden Commodore (VE)	32	+ 1 lap	29	30
Ret	2	(Australia) Garth Tander	Holden Racing Team	Holden Commodore (VE)	27	Engine	4	
Ret	14	(Australia) Cameron McConville	Brad Jones Racing	Holden Commodore (VE)	18	Retired	22	
Ret	22	(Australia) Will Davison	Holden Racing Team	Holden Commodore (VE)	14	Engine	13	
Ret	888	(Australia) Craig Lowndes	Triple Eight Race Engineering	Ford Falcon (FG)	1	Engine	5	
Fastest Lap: Tim Slade (Paul Morris Motorsport) - 1:10.8948 on lap 23

=== Race 16 ===
==== Qualifying ====
Pos	No	Name	Team	Vehicle	Time
1	5	(Australia) Mark Winterbottom	Ford Performance Racing	Ford Falcon (FG)	1:10.5290
2	25	(Australia) Jason Bright	Britek Motorsport	Ford Falcon (FG)	1:10.5443
3	1	(Australia) Jamie Whincup	Triple Eight Race Engineering	Ford Falcon (FG)	1:10.6263
4	18	(Australia) James Courtney	Dick Johnson Racing	Ford Falcon (FG)	1:10.6583
5	22	(Australia) Will Davison	Holden Racing Team	Holden Commodore (VE)	1:10.6746
6	888	(Australia) Craig Lowndes	Triple Eight Race Engineering	Ford Falcon (FG)	1:10.7040
7	111	(New Zealand) Fabian Coulthard	Paul Cruickshank Racing	Ford Falcon (FG)	1:10.7131
8	39	(Australia) Russell Ingall	Paul Morris Motorsport	Holden Commodore (VE)	1:10.7201
9	2	(Australia) Garth Tander	Holden Racing Team	Holden Commodore (VE)	1:10.7442
10	6	(New Zealand) Steven Richards	Ford Performance Racing	Ford Falcon (FG)	1:10.7902
11	51	(New Zealand) Greg Murphy	Tasman Motorsport	Holden Commodore (VE)	1:10.8886
12	17	(Australia) Steven Johnson	Dick Johnson Racing	Ford Falcon (FG)	1:10.9036
13	9	(New Zealand) Shane van Gisbergen	Stone Brothers Racing	Ford Falcon (FG)	1:10.9168
14	67	(Australia) Tim Slade	Paul Morris Motorsport	Holden Commodore (VE)	1:10.9336
15	34	(Australia) Michael Caruso	Garry Rogers Motorsport	Holden Commodore (VE)	1:10.9902
16	8	(New Zealand) Jason Richards	Brad Jones Racing	Holden Commodore (VE)	1:10.9914
17	33	(Australia) Lee Holdsworth	Garry Rogers Motorsport	Holden Commodore (VE)	1:11.0155
18	15	(Australia) Rick Kelly	Kelly Racing	Holden Commodore (VE)	1:11.0368
19	4	(Australia) Alex Davison	Stone Brothers Racing	Ford Falcon (FG)	1:11.0516
20	10	(Australia) Paul Dumbrell	Walkinshaw Racing	Holden Commodore (VE)	1:11.0697
21	7	(Australia) Todd Kelly	Kelly Racing	Holden Commodore (VE)	1:11.1382
22	55	(Australia) Tony D'Alberto	Rod Nash Racing	Holden Commodore (VE)	1:11.1618
23	3	(Australia) Jason Bargwanna	Tasman Motorsport	Holden Commodore (VE)	1:11.3698
24	14	(Australia) Cameron McConville	Brad Jones Racing	Holden Commodore (VE)	1:11.4389
25	24	(Australia) David Reynolds	Walkinshaw Racing	Holden Commodore (VE)	1:11.4585
26	333	(Australia) Michael Patrizi	Paul Cruickshank Racing	Ford Falcon (BF)	1:11.5516
27	11	(Australia) Jack Perkins	Kelly Racing	Holden Commodore (VE)	1:11.6149
28	12	(Australia) Dean Fiore	Triple F Racing	Holden Commodore (VE)	1:11.6684
29	16	(Australia) Mark McNally	Kelly Racing	Holden Commodore (VE)	1:12.0206

==== Race ====
Pos	No	Name	Team	Vehicle	Laps	Time/Retired	Grid	Points
1	22	(Australia) Will Davison	Holden Racing Team	Holden Commodore (VE)	65	1:20:30.0744	5	150
2	888	(Australia) Craig Lowndes	Triple Eight Race Engineering	Ford Falcon (FG)	65	+ 14.072	6	138
3	39	(Australia) Russell Ingall	Paul Morris Motorsport	Holden Commodore (VE)	65	+ 16.789	8	129
4	5	(Australia) Mark Winterbottom	Ford Performance Racing	Ford Falcon (FG)	65	+ 25.790	1	120
5	10	(Australia) Paul Dumbrell	Walkinshaw Racing	Holden Commodore (VE)	65	+ 28.364	20	111
6	34	(Australia) Michael Caruso	Garry Rogers Motorsport	Holden Commodore (VE)	65	+ 31.318	15	102
7	6	(New Zealand) Steven Richards	Ford Performance Racing	Ford Falcon (FG)	65	+ 35.661	10	96
8	18	(Australia) James Courtney	Dick Johnson Racing	Ford Falcon (FG)	65	+ 36.444	4	90
9	25	(Australia) Jason Bright	Britek Motorsport	Ford Falcon (FG)	65	+ 38.829	2	84
10	15	(Australia) Rick Kelly	Kelly Racing	Holden Commodore (VE)	65	+ 39.061	18	78
11	14	(Australia) Cameron McConville	Brad Jones Racing	Holden Commodore (VE)	65	+ 48.782	24	72
12	9	(New Zealand) Shane van Gisbergen	Stone Brothers Racing	Ford Falcon (FG)	65	+ 51.725	13	69
13	1	(Australia) Jamie Whincup	Triple Eight Race Engineering	Ford Falcon (FG)	65	+ 53.217	3	66
14	2	(Australia) Garth Tander	Holden Racing Team	Holden Commodore (VE)	65	+ 54.781	9	63
15	17	(Australia) Steven Johnson	Dick Johnson Racing	Ford Falcon (FG)	65	+ 56.249	12	60
16	33	(Australia) Lee Holdsworth	Garry Rogers Motorsport	Holden Commodore (VE)	65	+ 57.141	17	57
17	8	(New Zealand) Jason Richards	Brad Jones Racing	Holden Commodore (VE)	65	+ 57.373	16	54
18	7	(Australia) Todd Kelly	Kelly Racing	Holden Commodore (VE)	65	+ 1:02.775	21	51
19	4	(Australia) Alex Davison	Stone Brothers Racing	Ford Falcon (FG)	65	+ 1:07.072	19	48
20	24	(Australia) David Reynolds	Walkinshaw Racing	Holden Commodore (VE)	65	+ 1:07.345	25	45
21	12	(Australia) Dean Fiore	Triple F Racing	Holden Commodore (VE)	64	+ 1 lap	27	42
22	67	(Australia) Tim Slade	Paul Morris Motorsport	Holden Commodore (VE)	64	+ 1 lap	14	39
23	111	(New Zealand) Fabian Coulthard	Paul Cruickshank Racing	Ford Falcon (FG)	64	+ 1 lap	7	36
24	333	(Australia) Michael Patrizi	Paul Cruickshank Racing	Ford Falcon (BF)	64	+ 1 lap	26	33
25	3	(Australia) Jason Bargwanna	Tasman Motorsport	Holden Commodore (VE)	64	+ 1 lap	23	30
26	11	(Australia) Jack Perkins	Kelly Racing	Holden Commodore (VE)	64	+ 1 lap	27	27
27	16	(Australia) Mark McNally	Kelly Racing	Holden Commodore (VE)	63	+ 2 laps	29	24
Ret	55	(Australia) Tony D'Alberto	Rod Nash Racing	Holden Commodore (VE)	63	Retired	22	
Ret	51	(New Zealand) Greg Murphy	Tasman Motorsport	Holden Commodore (VE)	58	Retired	11	
Fastest Lap: Russell Ingall (Paul Morris Motorsport) - 1:10.7640 on lap 46

== Standings ==
After race 16 of 26.

Pos	No	Name	Team	Points
1	1	Jamie Whincup	Triple Eight Race Engineering	2007
2	22	Will Davison	Holden Racing Team	1824
3	2	Garth Tander	Holden Racing Team	1479
4	888	Craig Lowndes	Triple Eight Race Engineering	1478
5	17	Steven Johnson	Ford Performance Racing	1374

== Support categories ==
The 2009 Queensland House and Land.com 300 had four support categories.

Category	Round winner
Fujitsu V8 Supercar Series	Jonathon Webb (Ford BF Falcon)
Formula Ford	Mitch Evans (Mygale SJ07A Ford)
Touring Car Masters	Jim Richards (Ford Falcon Sprint)
Production Sports Cars	Roger Lago (Porsche 997 GT3 Carrera Cup)
