= 2010 Adelaide 500 =

2010 V8 supercar race

(South Australia) 2010 Adelaide 500
Event Information
- Round 3 of 14 in the 2010 V8 Supercar Championship Series
- Date: 11–14 March 2010
- Location: Adelaide, South Australia
- Venue: Adelaide Street Circuit
- Weather: Fine

Results
Race 1
| Distance | 78 laps | 250 km |
| Pole position | Jamie Whincup; Triple Eight Race Engineering | 1:21.5887 |
| Winner | Garth Tander; Holden Racing Team | 1:59:06.5574 |
Race 2
| Distance | 78 laps | 250 km |
| Pole position | Garth Tander; Holden Racing Team | 1:20.9560 |
| Winner | Garth Tander; Holden Racing Team | 1:58:01.9244 |

The 2010 Adelaide 500, known for naming rights reasons as the 2010 Clipsal 500, was the third event of the 2010 V8 Supercar Championship Series and the twelfth running of the Adelaide 500. It was held on the weekend of 11–14 March on the Adelaide Street Circuit, in South Australia.

Holden Racing Team driver Garth Tander won his second Adelaide 500, winning both races, salvaging his season after a poor start in the Middle-Eastern leg of the championship. Second in both races was leading Ford competitor, Dick Johnson Racing's James Courtney. The remaining podium positions were shared by Lee Holdsworth for Garry Rogers Motorsport on Saturday and Ford Performance Racing lead driver Mark Winterbottom on Sunday.

== Race results ==
=== Qualifying Race 5 ===
Qualifying timesheets:

| Pos | No | Name | Car | Team | Shootout | Qualifying |
|---|---|---|---|---|---|---|
| Pole | 1 | Jamie Whincup | Holden VE Commodore | Team Vodafone | 1:21.5587 | 1:21.6141 |
| 2 | 2 | Garth Tander | Holden VE Commodore | Holden Racing Team | 1:21.7839 | 1:21.3155 |
| 3 | 5 | Mark Winterbottom | Ford FG Falcon | Ford Performance Racing | 1:21.8360 | 1:21.7426 |
| 4 | 55 | Paul Dumbrell | Ford FG Falcon | Rod Nash Racing | 1:22.1511 | 1:21.5772 |
| 5 | 8 | Jason Richards | Holden VE Commodore | Brad Jones Racing | 1:22.1685 | 1:21.6925 |
| 6 | 24 | Fabian Coulthard | Holden VE Commodore | Walkinshaw Racing | 1:22.1874 | 1:21.8328 |
| 7 | 888 | Craig Lowndes | Holden VE Commodore | Team Vodafone | 1:22.2350 | 1:21.8232 |
| 8 | 33 | Lee Holdsworth | Holden VE Commodore | Garry Rogers Motorsport | 1:22.3484 | 1:21.8226 |
| 9 | 18 | Shane van Gisbergen | Ford FG Falcon | Stone Brothers Racing | 1:22.3925 | 1:21.6590 |
| 10 | 3 | Tony D'Alberto | Holden VE Commodore | Tony D'Alberto Racing | 1:22.6322 | 1:21.8359 |
| 11 | 7 | Todd Kelly | Holden VE Commodore | Kelly Racing | | 1:21.9089 |
| 12 | 51 | Greg Murphy | Holden VE Commodore | Paul Morris Motorsport | | 1:21.9708 |
| 13 | 17 | Steven Johnson | Ford FG Falcon | Dick Johnson Racing | | 1:22.0539 |
| 14 | 14 | Jason Bright | Holden VE Commodore | Brad Jones Racing | | 1:22.0572 |
| 15 | 15 | Rick Kelly | Holden VE Commodore | Kelly Racing | | 1:22.0968 |
| 16 | 18 | James Courtney | Ford FG Falcon | Dick Johnson Racing | | 1:22.1912 |
| 17 | 34 | Michael Caruso | Holden VE Commodore | Garry Rogers Motorsport | | 1:22.1924 |
| 18 | 6 | Steven Richards | Ford FG Falcon | Ford Performance Racing | | 1:22:2065 |
| 19 | 22 | Will Davison | Holden VE Commodore | Holden Racing Team | | 1:22.3856 |
| 20 | 39 | Russell Ingall | Holden VE Commodore | Paul Morris Motorsport | | 1:22.3905 |
| 21 | 47 | Tim Slade | Ford FG Falcon | James Rosenberg Racing | | 1:22.4129 |
| 22 | 11 | Jason Bargwanna | Holden VE Commodore | Kelly Racing | | 1:22.7128 |
| 23 | 4 | Alex Davison | Ford FG Falcon | Stone Brothers Racing | | 1:22.7238 |
| 24 | 12 | Dean Fiore | Ford FG Falcon | Triple F Racing | | 1:22.7405 |
| 25 | 19 | Jonathon Webb | Ford FG Falcon | Dick Johnson Racing | | 1:22.7853 |
| 26 | 21 | Karl Reindler | Holden VE Commodore | Britek Motorsport | | 1:22.8215 |
| 27 | 16 | Tony Ricciardello | Holden VE Commodore | Kelly Racing | | 1:23.2665 |
| 28 | 30 | Daniel Gaunt | Holden VE Commodore | Lucas Dumbrell Motorsport | | 1:23.3113 |
| 29 | 10 | Andrew Thompson | Holden VE Commodore | Walkinshaw Racing | | 1:27.5395 |

=== Race 5 ===
Race timesheets:

| Pos | No | Name | Team | Laps | Time/retired | Grid | Points |
|---|---|---|---|---|---|---|---|
| 1 | 2 | Garth Tander | Holden Racing Team | 78 | 1:59:06.5574 | 2 | 150 |
| 2 | 18 | James Courtney | Dick Johnson Racing | 78 | +4.0s | 16 | 138 |
| 3 | 33 | Lee Holdsworth | Garry Rogers Motorsport | 78 | +6.4s | 8 | 129 |
| 4 | 1 | Jamie Whincup | Triple Eight Race Engineering | 78 | +8.9s | 1 | 120 |
| 5 | 55 | Paul Dumbrell | Rod Nash Racing | 78 | +9.2s | 4 | 111 |
| 6 | 14 | Jason Bright | Brad Jones Racing | 78 | +14.8s | 14 | 102 |
| 7 | 24 | Fabian Coulthard | Walkinshaw Racing | 78 | +15.5s | 6 | 96 |
| 8 | 34 | Michael Caruso | Garry Rogers Motorsport | 78 | +16.0s | 17 | 90 |
| 9 | 22 | Will Davison | Holden Racing Team | 78 | +16.6s | 19 | 84 |
| 10 | 39 | Russell Ingall | Paul Morris Motorsport | 78 | +23.9s | 20 | 78 |
| 11 | 4 | Alex Davison | Stone Brothers Racing | 78 | +25.8s | 23 | 72 |
| 12 | 17 | Steven Johnson | Dick Johnson Racing | 78 | +29.9s | 13 | 69 |
| 13 | 7 | Todd Kelly | Kelly Racing | 78 | +31.6s | 11 | 66 |
| 14 | 3 | Tony D'Alberto | Tony D'Alberto Racing | 78 | +32.1s | 10 | 63 |
| 15 | 19 | Jonathon Webb | Tekno Autosports | 78 | +32.5s | 25 | 60 |
| 16 | 12 | Dean Fiore | Triple F Racing | 78 | +39.7s | 24 | 57 |
| 17 | 6 | Steven Richards | Ford Performance Racing | 78 | +46.8s | 18 | 54 |
| 18 | 30 | Daniel Gaunt | Lucas Dumbrell Motorsport | 78 | +1:04.3s | 28 | 51 |
| 19 | 888 | Craig Lowndes | Triple Eight Race Engineering | 78 | +1:15.5s | 7 | 48 |
| 20 | 16 | Tony Ricciardello | Kelly Racing | 78 | +1:16.1s | 27 | 45 |
| 21 | 5 | Mark Winterbottom | Ford Performance Racing | 75 | + 3 laps | 3 | 42 |
| 22 | 9 | Shane van Gisbergen | Stone Brothers Racing | 74 | + 4 laps | 9 | 39 |
| 23 | 15 | Rick Kelly | Kelly Racing | 66 | + 12 laps | 15 | 36 |
| Ret | 8 | Jason Richards | Brad Jones Racing | 39 | | 5 | |
| Ret | 51 | Greg Murphy | Paul Morris Motorsport | 38 | | 12 | |
| Ret | 21 | Karl Reindler | Britek Motorsport | 31 | | 26 | |
| Ret | 47 | Tim Slade | James Rosenberg Racing | 12 | | 21 | |
| Ret | 11 | Jason Bargwanna | Kelly Racing | 2 | | 22 | |
| DNS | 10 | Andrew Thompson | Walkinshaw Racing | | | | |

=== Qualifying Race 6 ===
Qualifying timesheets:

| Pos | No | Name | Car | Team | Qualifying |
|---|---|---|---|---|---|
| Pole | 2 | Garth Tander | Holden VE Commodore | Holden Racing Team | 1:20.9560 |
| 2 | 1 | Jamie Whincup | Holden VE Commodore | Team Vodafone | 1:21.0513 |
| 3 | 5 | Mark Winterbottom | Ford FG Falcon | Ford Performance Racing | 1:21.1788 |
| 4 | 17 | Steven Johnson | Ford FG Falcon | Dick Johnson Racing | 1:21.2616 |
| 5 | 34 | Michael Caruso | Holden VE Commodore | Garry Rogers Motorsport | 1:21.4465 |
| 6 | 15 | Rick Kelly | Holden VE Commodore | Kelly Racing | 1:21.4698 |
| 7 | 22 | Will Davison | Holden VE Commodore | Holden Racing Team | 1:21.4946 |
| 8 | 18 | Shane van Gisbergen | Ford FG Falcon | Stone Brothers Racing | 1:21.5496 |
| 9 | 18 | James Courtney | Ford FG Falcon | Dick Johnson Racing | 1:21.5701 |
| 10 | 3 | Tony D'Alberto | Holden VE Commodore | Tony D'Alberto Racing | 1:21.5992 |
| 11 | 8 | Jason Richards | Holden VE Commodore | Brad Jones Racing | 1:21.6145 |
| 12 | 51 | Greg Murphy | Holden VE Commodore | Paul Morris Motorsport | 1:21.7072 |
| 13 | 6 | Steven Richards | Ford FG Falcon | Ford Performance Racing | 1:21.7172 |
| 14 | 888 | Craig Lowndes | Holden VE Commodore | Team Vodafone | 1:21.7422 |
| 15 | 33 | Lee Holdsworth | Holden VE Commodore | Garry Rogers Motorsport | 1:21.7579 |
| 16 | 14 | Jason Bright | Holden VE Commodore | Brad Jones Racing | 1:21.8514 |
| 17 | 24 | Fabian Coulthard | Holden VE Commodore | Walkinshaw Racing | 1:21.9002 |
| 18 | 55 | Paul Dumbrell | Ford FG Falcon | Rod Nash Racing | 1:21.9301 |
| 19 | 39 | Russell Ingall | Holden VE Commodore | Paul Morris Motorsport | 1:21.9745 |
| 20 | 4 | Alex Davison | Ford FG Falcon | Stone Brothers Racing | 1:22.0832 |
| 21 | 19 | Jonathon Webb | Ford FG Falcon | Dick Johnson Racing | 1:22.1623 |
| 22 | 7 | Todd Kelly | Holden VE Commodore | Kelly Racing | 1:22.2307 |
| 23 | 47 | Tim Slade | Ford FG Falcon | James Rosenberg Racing | 1:22.3026 |
| 24 | 21 | Karl Reindler | Holden VE Commodore | Britek Motorsport | 1:22.4228 |
| 25 | 11 | Jason Bargwanna | Holden VE Commodore | Kelly Racing | 1:22.6178 |
| 26 | 12 | Dean Fiore | Ford FG Falcon | Triple F Racing | 1:22.6279 |
| 27 | 30 | Daniel Gaunt | Holden VE Commodore | Lucas Dumbrell Motorsport | 1:22.8259 |
| 28 | 16 | Tony Ricciardello | Holden VE Commodore | Kelly Racing | 1:23.3578 |

=== Race 6 ===
Race timesheets:

| Pos | No | Name | Team | Laps | Time/retired | Grid | Points |
|---|---|---|---|---|---|---|---|
| 1 | 2 | Garth Tander | Holden Racing Team | 78 | 1:58:01.9244 | 1 | 150 |
| 2 | 18 | James Courtney | Dick Johnson Racing | 78 | +1.0s | 9 | 138 |
| 3 | 5 | Mark Winterbottom | Ford Performance Racing | 78 | +2.1s | 3 | 129 |
| 4 | 9 | Shane van Gisbergen | Stone Brothers Racing | 78 | +3.4s | 8 | 120 |
| 5 | 55 | Paul Dumbrell | Rod Nash Racing | 78 | +3.8s | 18 | 111 |
| 6 | 15 | Rick Kelly | Kelly Racing | 78 | +6.1s | 6 | 102 |
| 7 | 3 | Tony D'Alberto | Tony D'Alberto Racing | 78 | +7.0s | 10 | 96 |
| 8 | 17 | Steven Johnson | Dick Johnson Racing | 78 | +7.7s | 4 | 78 |
| 9 | 8 | Jason Richards | Brad Jones Racing | 78 | +8.2s | 11 | 72 |
| 10 | 34 | Michael Caruso | Garry Rogers Motorsport | 78 | +10.1s | 5 | 69 |
| 11 | 33 | Lee Holdsworth | Garry Rogers Motorsport | 78 | +10.8s | 15 | 66 |
| 12 | 7 | Todd Kelly | Kelly Racing | 78 | +11.6s | 22 | 63 |
| 13 | 6 | Steven Richards | Ford Performance Racing | 78 | +14.0s | 13 | 60 |
| 14 | 22 | Will Davison | Holden Racing Team | 78 | +16.4s | 7 | 63 |
| 15 | 19 | Jonathon Webb | Tekno Autosports | 78 | +19.2s | 21 | 60 |
| 16 | 888 | Craig Lowndes | Triple Eight Race Engineering | 78 | +21.6s | 14 | 57 |
| 17 | 47 | Tim Slade | James Rosenberg Racing | 78 | +23.8s | 23 | 54 |
| 18 | 1 | Jamie Whincup | Triple Eight Race Engineering | 78 | +35.5s | 2 | 51 |
| 19 | 39 | Russell Ingall | Paul Morris Motorsport | 78 | +1:13.1s | 19 | 48 |
| 20 | 21 | Karl Reindler | Britek Motorsport | 77 | + 1 lap | 24 | 45 |
| 21 | 16 | Tony Ricciardello | Kelly Racing | 77 | + 1 lap | 28 | 42 |
| 22 | 12 | Dean Fiore | Triple F Racing | 77 | + 1 lap | 26 | 39 |
| 23 | 4 | Alex Davison | Stone Brothers Racing | 77 | + 1 lap | 20 | 36 |
| 24 | 11 | Jason Bargwanna | Kelly Racing | 77 | + 1 lap | 25 | 33 |
| 25 | 30 | Daniel Gaunt | Lucas Dumbrell Motorsport | 77 | + 1 lap | 27 | 30 |
| 26 | 14 | Jason Bright | Brad Jones Racing | 77 | + 1 lap | 16 | 27 |
| 27 | 24 | Fabian Coulthard | Walkinshaw Racing | 62 | + 16 laps | 17 | 24 |
| Ret | 51 | Greg Murphy | Paul Morris Motorsport | 2 | | 12 | |
| DNS | 10 | Andrew Thompson | Walkinshaw Racing | | | | |

== Standings ==
- After Race 6 of 26

| Pos | No | Name | Team | Points |
|---|---|---|---|---|
| 1 | 1 | Jamie Whincup | Triple Eight Race Engineering | 771 |
| 2 | 5 | Mark Winterbottom | Ford Performance Racing | 714 |
| 3 | 18 | James Courtney | Dick Johnson Racing | 696 |
| 4 | 9 | Shane van Gisbergen | Stone Brothers Racing | 630 |
| 5 | 33 | Lee Holdsworth | Garry Rogers Motorsport | 573 |
