= Marcus Marshall (disambiguation) =

Marcus Marshall is a racing driver.

Marcus Marshall may also refer to:

- Marcus Marshall (footballer) (born 1989), English footballer
- Marcus Marshall Motorsport

== See also ==
- Mark Marshall
