= 2009 Tasmania Challenge =

2009 Supercar Championship event

2009 Falken Tasmania Challenge
Event Information
- Round 4 of 14 in the 2009 V8 Supercar Championship Series
- Date: 29–31 May 2009
- Location: Launceston, Tasmania
- Venue: Symmons Plains Raceway
- Weather: Fine

Results
Race 1
Distance	42 laps	100 km
Pole position	Garth Tander; Holden Racing Team	51.7043
Winner	Garth Tander; Holden Racing Team	37:13.9662
Race 2
Distance	84 laps	200 km
Pole position	Jamie Whincup; Triple Eight Race Engineering	51.4898
Winner	Jamie Whincup; Triple Eight Race Engineering	1:22:07.8219

The 2009 Tasmania Challenge (known for naming rights reasons as the 2009 Falken Tasmania Challenge) was the fourth round of the 2009 V8 Supercar Championship Series. It was the 37th ATCC/V8 Supercar event to be held at Symmons Plains Raceway and was held on the weekend of 29 to 31 May in Launceston, Tasmania.

Garth Tander broke the Triple Eight Race Engineering stranglehold to take his first victory of the year in race one from pole position, and marked the first win of the year for the Holden brand. Championship leader Jamie Whincup would strike back the following day to take pole position and won the second race narrowly over Will Davison of the Holden Racing Team.

== Background ==
The event was held on the weekend of 29 to 31 May 2009. It was the 37th ATCC/V8 Supercar event to be held at Symmons Plains Raceway, and consisted of one 100 kilometre race held as Race 7 on Saturday, with a 200 kilometre race held on Sunday as Race 8.

=== Entry list ===
There were 30 drivers entered into this event. 18 drivers would compete in a VE Holden Commodore while nine drivers would utilise the FG Ford Falcon and three would remain with the BF Ford Falcon.

The Triple F Racing entrant of Dean Fiore changed from the number 021 used during Team Kiwi Racing's tenure to the number 12 from this round onwards.

=== Support categories ===
Category	Races	Round winner
Australian V8 Ute Racing Series	3	(Australia) Layton Crambrook (Ford Falcon BF Ute)
Australian Formula Ford Championship	3	(Australia) Nick Percat (Mygale SJ07A)
Australian Mini Challenge	3	(Australia) Grant Denyer (Mini F56)
Targa Invitational Series	3	(Australia) Jason White (Lamborghini Gallardo)

== Race report ==
=== Race 7 ===
The first race was held on Saturday May 30. Garth Tander was able to break the year long stranglehold Team Vodafone has held on the 2009 series, taking a narrow victory over Russell Ingall after an innovative use of tyre tactics saw Ingall get much better tyre life out of his set of soft, sprint, tyres. Instead of changing tyres at his pitstop to a set of the harder, slow tyres, Ingall rotated his tyres, swapping the tyres diagonally front/rear and left/right, giving him the best grip of any of the front runners in the races late stages and it was only Tander's ability to put lapped traffic between himself and Ingall that gave the Holden Racing Team driver the race victory.

Steven Johnson continued his best ever V8 Supercar season with a third place, and best of the Ford drivers. It was Johnson's second podium result of the year after claiming third at Race 4 at the Hamilton 400. Will Davison backed up Tander's win in fourth place, making it the best day of the season for HRT ahead of Todd Kelly, his best result of the year to date, and Stone Brothers race Shane van Gisbergen. Team mates Craig Lowndes and Jamie Whincup followed with a much improved Greg Murphy ninth and a disappointing Lee Holdsworth scraping into the top ten.

James Courtney was involved in several on track skirmishes, including receiving a puncture and pitting on the very lap that his team mate Steven Johnson was already in the pits having his scheduled pitstop, forcing Courtney to lose time waiting for his team to service Johnson's #17 Ford. He finished last on a day when all 30 cars finished the race.

=== Race 8 ===
Race 8 was held on Sunday May 31.

== Race results ==
=== Race 7 ===
==== Qualifying ====
Pos	No	Name	Team	Vehicle	Qual 1	Qual 2
1	1	(Australia) Jamie Whincup	Triple Eight Race Engineering	Ford Falcon (FG)		51.4661
2	17	(Australia) Steven Johnson	Dick Johnson Racing	Ford Falcon (FG)		51.5289
3	6	(New Zealand) Steven Richards	Ford Performance Racing	Ford Falcon (FG)		51.5381
4	9	(New Zealand) Shane van Gisbergen	Stone Brothers Racing	Ford Falcon (FG)		51.5525
5	51	(New Zealand) Greg Murphy	Tasman Motorsport	Holden Commodore (VE)		51.5554
6	18	(Australia) James Courtney	Dick Johnson Racing	Ford Falcon (FG)		51.5702
7	888	(Australia) Craig Lowndes	Triple Eight Race Engineering	Ford Falcon (FG)		51.5795
8	39	(Australia) Russell Ingall	Paul Morris Motorsport	Holden Commodore (VE)		51.6319
9	15	(Australia) Rick Kelly	Kelly Racing	Holden Commodore (VE)		51.6595
10	2	(Australia) Garth Tander	Holden Racing Team	Holden Commodore (VE)		51.6615
11	7	(Australia) Todd Kelly	Kelly Racing	Holden Commodore (VE)		51.6648
12	5	(Australia) Mark Winterbottom	Ford Performance Racing	Ford Falcon (FG)		51.6909
13	33	(Australia) Lee Holdsworth	Garry Rogers Motorsport	Holden Commodore (VE)		51.6992
14	22	(Australia) Will Davison	Holden Racing Team	Holden Commodore (VE)		51.7076
15	111	(New Zealand) Fabian Coulthard	Paul Cruickshank Racing	Ford Falcon (FG)		51.7363
16	34	(Australia) Michael Caruso	Garry Rogers Motorsport	Holden Commodore (VE)		51.7609
17	4	(Australia) Alex Davison	Stone Brothers Racing	Ford Falcon (FG)		51.8326
18	25	(Australia) Jason Bright	Britek Motorsport	Ford Falcon (BF)		51.8722
19	77	(Australia) Marcus Marshall	Marcus Marshall Motorsport	Ford Falcon (BF)		51.9777
20	11	(Australia) Jack Perkins	Kelly Racing	Holden Commodore (VE)		51.9952
21	67	(Australia) Tim Slade	Paul Morris Motorsport	Holden Commodore (VE)	52.1462	—N/a
22	8	(New Zealand) Jason Richards	Brad Jones Racing	Holden Commodore (VE)	52.1608	—N/a
23	3	(Australia) Jason Bargwanna	Tasman Motorsport	Holden Commodore (VE)	52.1620	—N/a
24	10	(Australia) Paul Dumbrell	Walkinshaw Racing	Holden Commodore (VE)	52.2415	—N/a
25	16	(Australia) Dale Wood	Kelly Racing	Holden Commodore (VE)	52.2837	—N/a
26	24	(Australia) David Reynolds	Walkinshaw Racing	Holden Commodore (VE)	52.3269	—N/a
27	55	(Australia) Tony D'Alberto	Rod Nash Racing	Holden Commodore (VE)	52.3567	—N/a
28	333	(Australia) Michael Patrizi	Paul Cruickshank Racing	Ford Falcon (BF)	52.4432	—N/a
29	12	(Australia) Dean Fiore	Triple F Racing	Holden Commodore (VE)	52.4716	—N/a
30	14	(Australia) Cameron McConville	Brad Jones Racing	Holden Commodore (VE)	52.5021	—N/a

==== Top ten shootout ====
Pos	No	Name	Team	Vehicle	Time
1	2	(Australia) Garth Tander	Holden Racing Team	Holden Commodore (VE)	51.7043
2	51	(New Zealand) Greg Murphy	Tasman Motorsport	Holden Commodore (VE)	51.7574
3	17	(Australia) Steven Johnson	Dick Johnson Racing	Ford Falcon (FG)	51.8509
4	39	(Australia) Russell Ingall	Paul Morris Motorsport	Holden Commodore (VE)	51.8956
5	18	(Australia) James Courtney	Dick Johnson Racing	Ford Falcon (FG)	51.9352
6	15	(Australia) Rick Kelly	Kelly Racing	Holden Commodore (VE)	52.0238
7	9	(New Zealand) Shane van Gisbergen	Stone Brothers Racing	Ford Falcon (FG)	52.0414
8	1	(Australia) Jamie Whincup	Triple Eight Race Engineering	Ford Falcon (FG)	52.0890
9	6	(New Zealand) Steven Richards	Ford Performance Racing	Ford Falcon (FG)	52.2080
EXC	888	(Australia) Craig Lowndes	Triple Eight Race Engineering	Ford Falcon (FG)	excluded

==== Race ====
Pos	No	Name	Team	Vehicle	Laps	Time/Retired	Grid	Points
1	2	(Australia) Garth Tander	Holden Racing Team	Holden Commodore (VE)	42	37:13.9662	1	150
2	39	(Australia) Russell Ingall	Paul Morris Motorsport	Holden Commodore (VE)	42	+ 0.129	4	138
3	17	(Australia) Steven Johnson	Dick Johnson Racing	Ford Falcon (FG)	42	+ 8.733	3	129
4	22	(Australia) Will Davison	Holden Racing Team	Holden Commodore (VE)	42	+ 10.603	14	120
5	7	(Australia) Todd Kelly	Kelly Racing	Holden Commodore (VE)	42	+ 11.180	11	111
6	9	(New Zealand) Shane van Gisbergen	Stone Brothers Racing	Ford Falcon (FG)	42	+ 14.869	7	102
7	888	(Australia) Craig Lowndes	Triple Eight Race Engineering	Ford Falcon (FG)	42	+ 16.398	10	96
8	1	(Australia) Jamie Whincup	Triple Eight Race Engineering	Ford Falcon (FG)	42	+ 21.409	8	90
9	51	(New Zealand) Greg Murphy	Tasman Motorsport	Holden Commodore (VE)	42	+ 22.178	2	84
10	33	(Australia) Lee Holdsworth	Garry Rogers Motorsport	Holden Commodore (VE)	42	+ 22.535	13	78
11	15	(Australia) Rick Kelly	Kelly Racing	Holden Commodore (VE)	42	+ 22.910	5	72
12	34	(Australia) Michael Caruso	Garry Rogers Motorsport	Holden Commodore (VE)	42	+ 33.633	16	69
13	14	(Australia) Cameron McConville	Brad Jones Racing	Holden Commodore (VE)	42	+ 34.353	30	66
14	111	(New Zealand) Fabian Coulthard	Paul Cruickshank Racing	Ford Falcon (FG)	42	+ 41.182	15	63
15	6	(New Zealand) Steven Richards	Ford Performance Racing	Ford Falcon (FG)	42	+ 41.436	9	60
16	5	(Australia) Mark Winterbottom	Ford Performance Racing	Ford Falcon (FG)	42	+ 41.988	12	57
17	4	(Australia) Alex Davison	Stone Brothers Racing	Ford Falcon (FG)	42	+ 43.889	17	54
18	8	(New Zealand) Jason Richards	Brad Jones Racing	Holden Commodore (VE)	41	+ 1 lap	22	51
19	3	(Australia) Jason Bargwanna	Tasman Motorsport	Holden Commodore (VE)	41	+ 1 lap	23	48
20	24	(Australia) David Reynolds	Walkinshaw Racing	Holden Commodore (VE)	41	+ 1 lap	26	45
21	11	(Australia) Jack Perkins	Kelly Racing	Holden Commodore (VE)	41	+ 1 lap	20	42
22	77	(Australia) Marcus Marshall	Marcus Marshall Motorsport	Ford Falcon (BF)	41	+ 1 lap	19	39
23	10	(Australia) Paul Dumbrell	Walkinshaw Racing	Holden Commodore (VE)	41	+ 1 lap	24	36
24	67	(Australia) Tim Slade	Paul Morris Motorsport	Holden Commodore (VE)	41	+ 1 lap	21	33
25	55	(Australia) Tony D'Alberto	Rod Nash Racing	Holden Commodore (VE)	41	+ 1 lap	27	30
26	25	(Australia) Jason Bright	Britek Motorsport	Ford Falcon (BF)	41	+ 1 lap	18	27
27	333	(Australia) Michael Patrizi	Paul Cruickshank Racing	Ford Falcon (BF)	40	+ 2 laps	28	24
28	16	(Australia) Dale Wood	Kelly Racing	Holden Commodore (VE)	40	+ 2 laps	25	21
29	12	(Australia) Dean Fiore	Triple F Racing	Holden Commodore (VE)	40	+ 2 laps	29	18
30	18	(Australia) James Courtney	Dick Johnson Racing	Ford Falcon (FG)	40	+ 2 laps	4	15
Fastest Lap: Rick Kelly (Kelly Racing) - 51.4713 on lap 6

=== Race 8 ===
==== Qualifying ====
Pos	No	Name	Team	Vehicle	Time
1	1	(Australia) Jamie Whincup	Triple Eight Race Engineering	Ford Falcon (FG)	51.4898
2	7	(Australia) Todd Kelly	Kelly Racing	Holden Commodore (VE)	51.5662
3	51	(New Zealand) Greg Murphy	Tasman Motorsport	Holden Commodore (VE)	51.5862
4	22	(Australia) Will Davison	Holden Racing Team	Holden Commodore (VE)	51.5895
5	5	(Australia) Mark Winterbottom	Ford Performance Racing	Ford Falcon (FG)	51.6190
6	6	(New Zealand) Steven Richards	Ford Performance Racing	Ford Falcon (FG)	51.6388
7	111	(New Zealand) Fabian Coulthard	Paul Cruickshank Racing	Ford Falcon (FG)	51.6515
8	18	(Australia) James Courtney	Dick Johnson Racing	Ford Falcon (FG)	51.6597
9	17	(Australia) Steven Johnson	Dick Johnson Racing	Ford Falcon (FG)	51.6625
10	2	(Australia) Garth Tander	Holden Racing Team	Holden Commodore (VE)	51.7207
11	9	(New Zealand) Shane van Gisbergen	Stone Brothers Racing	Ford Falcon (FG)	51.7229
12	39	(Australia) Russell Ingall	Paul Morris Motorsport	Holden Commodore (VE)	51.7271
13	33	(Australia) Lee Holdsworth	Garry Rogers Motorsport	Holden Commodore (VE)	51.7409
14	15	(Australia) Rick Kelly	Kelly Racing	Holden Commodore (VE)	51.7573
15	3	(Australia) Jason Bargwanna	Tasman Motorsport	Holden Commodore (VE)	51.8179
16	888	(Australia) Craig Lowndes	Triple Eight Race Engineering	Ford Falcon (FG)	51.8907
17	16	(Australia) Dale Wood	Kelly Racing	Holden Commodore (VE)	51.9163
18	25	(Australia) Jason Bright	Britek Motorsport	Ford Falcon (BF)	51.9731
19	4	(Australia) Alex Davison	Stone Brothers Racing	Ford Falcon (FG)	51.9978
20	8	(New Zealand) Jason Richards	Brad Jones Racing	Holden Commodore (VE)	52.0411
21	34	(Australia) Michael Caruso	Garry Rogers Motorsport	Holden Commodore (VE)	52.0981
22	11	(Australia) Jack Perkins	Kelly Racing	Holden Commodore (VE)	52.1052
23	333	(Australia) Michael Patrizi	Paul Cruickshank Racing	Ford Falcon (BF)	52.1309
24	24	(Australia) David Reynolds	Walkinshaw Racing	Holden Commodore (VE)	52.1570
25	10	(Australia) Paul Dumbrell	Walkinshaw Racing	Holden Commodore (VE)	52.1759
26	14	(Australia) Cameron McConville	Brad Jones Racing	Holden Commodore (VE)	52.2187
27	55	(Australia) Tony D'Alberto	Rod Nash Racing	Holden Commodore (VE)	52.2422
28	67	(Australia) Tim Slade	Paul Morris Motorsport	Holden Commodore (VE)	52.2766
29	77	(Australia) Marcus Marshall	Marcus Marshall Motorsport	Ford Falcon (BF)	52.2767
30	12	(Australia) Dean Fiore	Triple F Racing	Holden Commodore (VE)	52.6140

==== Race ====
Pos	No	Name	Team	Vehicle	Laps	Time/Retired	Grid	Points
1	1	(Australia) Jamie Whincup	Triple Eight Race Engineering	Ford Falcon (FG)	84	1:22:07.8219	1	150
2	22	(Australia) Will Davison	Holden Racing Team	Holden Commodore (VE)	84	+ 0.439	4	138
3	111	(New Zealand) Fabian Coulthard	Paul Cruickshank Racing	Ford Falcon (FG)	84	+ 0.616	7	129
4	5	(Australia) Mark Winterbottom	Ford Performance Racing	Ford Falcon (FG)	84	+ 3.602	5	120
5	33	(Australia) Lee Holdsworth	Garry Rogers Motorsport	Holden Commodore (VE)	84	+ 4.444	13	111
6	39	(Australia) Russell Ingall	Paul Morris Motorsport	Holden Commodore (VE)	84	+ 7.813	12	102
7	25	(Australia) Jason Bright	Britek Motorsport	Ford Falcon (BF)	84	+ 8.883	18	96
8	3	(Australia) Jason Bargwanna	Tasman Motorsport	Holden Commodore (VE)	84	+ 9.504	15	90
9	333	(Australia) Michael Patrizi	Paul Cruickshank Racing	Ford Falcon (BF)	84	+ 10.033	23	84
10	888	(Australia) Craig Lowndes	Triple Eight Race Engineering	Ford Falcon (FG)	84	+ 11.631	16	78
11	4	(Australia) Alex Davison	Stone Brothers Racing	Ford Falcon (FG)	84	+ 11.972	19	72
12	2	(Australia) Garth Tander	Holden Racing Team	Holden Commodore (VE)	84	+ 12.179	10	69
13	14	(Australia) Cameron McConville	Brad Jones Racing	Holden Commodore (VE)	84	+ 13.124	26	66
14	67	(Australia) Tim Slade	Paul Morris Motorsport	Holden Commodore (VE)	84	+ 9.716*	28	63
15	6	(New Zealand) Steven Richards	Ford Performance Racing	Ford Falcon (FG)	84	+ 13.407	6	60
16	34	(Australia) Michael Caruso	Garry Rogers Motorsport	Holden Commodore (VE)	84	+ 50.973	21	57
17	10	(Australia) Paul Dumbrell	Walkinshaw Racing	Holden Commodore (VE)	84	+ 1 lap	25	54
18	17	(Australia) Steven Johnson	Dick Johnson Racing	Ford Falcon (FG)	83	+ 1 lap	9	51
19	55	(Australia) Tony D'Alberto	Rod Nash Racing	Holden Commodore (VE)	83	+ 1 lap	27	48
20	9	(New Zealand) Shane van Gisbergen	Stone Brothers Racing	Ford Falcon (FG)	83	+ 1 lap	11	45
21	11	(Australia) Jack Perkins	Kelly Racing	Holden Commodore (VE)	83	+ 1 lap	22	42
22	51	(New Zealand) Greg Murphy	Tasman Motorsport	Holden Commodore (VE)	82	+ 2 laps	3	39
23	8	(New Zealand) Jason Richards	Brad Jones Racing	Holden Commodore (VE)	82	+ 2 laps	20	36
24	77	(Australia) Marcus Marshall	Marcus Marshall Motorsport	Ford Falcon (BF)	83	+ 1 lap*	29	33
25	12	(Australia) Dean Fiore	Triple F Racing	Holden Commodore (VE)	81	+ 3 laps	30	30
26	24	(Australia) David Reynolds	Walkinshaw Racing	Holden Commodore (VE)	81	+ 3 laps	24	27
27	15	(Australia) Rick Kelly	Kelly Racing	Holden Commodore (VE)	79	+ 5 laps	14	24
Ret	18	(Australia) James Courtney	Dick Johnson Racing	Ford Falcon (FG)	59	Retired	8	
Ret	16	(Australia) Dale Wood	Kelly Racing	Holden Commodore (VE)	58	Retired	17	
Ret	7	(Australia) Todd Kelly	Kelly Racing	Holden Commodore (VE)	43	Retired	2	
Fastest Lap: Mark Winterbottom (Ford Performance Racing) - 51.8066 on lap 16

* Penalties were applied to Tim Slade and Marcus Marshall. Slade was relegated from ninth to 14th. Marshall was relegated from 22nd to 24th.

== Championship standings ==
- After Round 4 of 14

Pos	No.	Name	Team	Points
1	1	(Australia) Jamie Whincup	Triple Eight Race Engineering	1044
2	22	(Australia) Will Davison	Holden Racing Team	948
3	17	(Australia) Steven Johnson	Dick Johnson Racing	753
4	2	(Australia) Garth Tander	Holden Racing Team	723
5	33	(Australia) Lee Holdsworth	Garry Rogers Motorsport	723
