= 2009 Adelaide 500 =

2009 Supercar Championship event

(South Australia) 2009 Adelaide 500
Event Information
- Round 1 of 14 in the 2009 V8 Supercar Championship Series
- Date: 20–22 March 2009
- Location: Adelaide, South Australia
- Venue: Adelaide Street Circuit
- Weather: Fine

Results
Race 1
Distance	78 laps	250 km
Pole position	Jamie Whincup; Triple Eight Race Engineering	1:21.8123
Winner	Jamie Whincup; Triple Eight Race Engineering	1:59:06.5279
Race 2
Distance	78 laps	250 km
Winner	Jamie Whincup; Triple Eight Race Engineering	2:00:39.5887

The 2009 Adelaide 500 (known for naming rights reasons as the 2009 Clipsal 500 Adelaide) was the first round of the 2009 V8 Supercar Championship Series. It was the eleventh V8 Supercar event to be held on the Adelaide Street Circuit and was held on the weekend of 20 to 22 March in Adelaide, South Australia.

Defending champion Jamie Whincup dominated the weekend by claiming pole position and winning both races to boot.

== Background ==
The event was held on the weekend of 20 to 22 March 2009. It was the eleventh V8 Supercar event to be held on the Adelaide Street Circuit, and consisted of two 250 km races with compulsory pitstops in both instances.

=== Entry list ===
There were 30 drivers entered into this event. 18 drivers would compete in a VE Holden Commodore while nine drivers would utilise the FG Ford Falcon and three would remain with the BF Ford Falcon.

Kelly Racing would make their series debut after taking over the competition licences from Perkins Engineering at the end of 2008.

Tim Slade of Paul Morris Motorsport made his main game V8 Supercar debut at this round. At the newly-formed Kelly Racing, Dale Wood would make his solo debut in the series.

Marcus Marshall would debut a privateer outfit which would make its first appearance in the series at this round.

=== Support categories ===
Category	Races	Round winner
Fujitsu V8 Supercar Series	2	(Australia) David Russell (Ford Falcon (BA))
Australian V8 Ute Racing Series	3	(Australia) Gary Baxter (Holden VE Ute)
Australian GT Championship	3	(New Zealand) Craig Baird (Mosler MT900 GT3)
Australian Formula 3 Championship	2	(United Kingdom) Joey Foster (Dallara F307)
Aussie Racing Cars	4	(Australia) Kyle Clews (Ford Falcon (AU))
Touring Car Masters	4	(Australia) Gavin Bullas (1969 Ford Boss Mustang)

== Race report ==
=== Qualifying ===
Qualifying was held on Friday, 20 March, and was split into two sessions. Session one lasted for 34 minutes and 15 seconds and saw the top ten drivers qualifying for the Top Ten Shootout, with positions 11–30 being set by times in the session. In this first session, reigning series champion Jamie Whincup set the pace, setting a new qualifying lap record of 1:21.2773. Although he was some half a second slower in the Shootout, Whincup was still quick enough to lead a Triple Eight Race Engineering 1–2 with Craig Lowndes 0.2545 seconds behind. Mark Winterbottom and Lee Holdsworth had both gone faster than Lowndes, but both drivers lost their respective times due to excessive kerbing use during their hot laps. Garth Tander was top Holden in third, with James Courtney qualifying fourth, in his first session as a Dick Johnson Racing driver.

=== Race 1 ===
Race 1 was held on Saturday, 21 March.

=== Race 2 ===
Race 2 was held on Sunday, 22 March.

== Race results ==
=== Qualifying ===
Pos	No	Name	Team	Vehicle	Part 1	Part 2
1	1	(Australia) Jamie Whincup	Triple Eight Race Engineering	Ford Falcon (FG)		1:21.2773
2	5	(Australia) Mark Winterbottom	Ford Performance Racing	Ford Falcon (FG)		1:21.4407
3	22	(Australia) Will Davison	Holden Racing Team	Holden Commodore (VE)		1:21.5008
4	8	(New Zealand) Jason Richards	Brad Jones Racing	Holden Commodore (VE)		1:21.5227
5	2	(Australia) Garth Tander	Holden Racing Team	Holden Commodore (VE)		1:21.5662
6	10	(Australia) Paul Dumbrell	Walkinshaw Racing	Holden Commodore (VE)		1:21.5844
7	888	(Australia) Craig Lowndes	Triple Eight Race Engineering	Ford Falcon (FG)		1:21.6343
8	18	(Australia) James Courtney	Dick Johnson Racing	Ford Falcon (FG)		1:21.6809
9	33	(Australia) Lee Holdsworth	Garry Rogers Motorsport	Holden Commodore (VE)		1:21.8147
10	111	(New Zealand) Fabian Coulthard	Paul Cruickshank Racing	Ford Falcon (FG)		1:21.9039
11	6	(New Zealand) Steven Richards	Ford Performance Racing	Ford Falcon (FG)		1:21.9388
12	9	(New Zealand) Shane van Gisbergen	Stone Brothers Racing	Ford Falcon (FG)		1:21.9976
13	25	(Australia) Jason Bright	Britek Motorsport	Ford Falcon (BF)		1:22.0567
14	17	(Australia) Steven Johnson	Dick Johnson Racing	Ford Falcon (FG)		1:22.0619
15	34	(Australia) Michael Caruso	Garry Rogers Motorsport	Holden Commodore (VE)		1:22.0877
16	39	(Australia) Russell Ingall	Paul Morris Motorsport	Holden Commodore (VE)		1:22.1041
17	15	(Australia) Rick Kelly	Kelly Racing	Holden Commodore (VE)		1:22.1090
18	51	(New Zealand) Greg Murphy	Tasman Motorsport	Holden Commodore (VE)		1:22.2240
19	67	(Australia) Tim Slade	Paul Morris Motorsport	Holden Commodore (VE)		1:22.3902
20	55	(Australia) Tony D'Alberto	Rod Nash Racing	Holden Commodore (VE)		1:22.4528
21	77	(Australia) Marcus Marshall	Marcus Marshall Motorsport	Ford Falcon (BF)	1:22.7828	—N/a
22	24	(Australia) David Reynolds	Walkinshaw Racing	Holden Commodore (VE)	1:22.7843	—N/a
23	3	(Australia) Jason Bargwanna	Tasman Motorsport	Holden Commodore (VE)	1:22.8073	—N/a
24	7	(Australia) Todd Kelly	Kelly Racing	Holden Commodore (VE)	1:22.8853	—N/a
25	11	(Australia) Jack Perkins	Kelly Racing	Holden Commodore (VE)	1:23.0927	—N/a
26	4	(Australia) Alex Davison	Stone Brothers Racing	Ford Falcon (FG)	1:23.3827	—N/a
27	333	(Australia) Michael Patrizi	Paul Cruickshank Racing	Ford Falcon (BF)	1:23.8807	—N/a
28	021	(Australia) Dean Fiore	Team Kiwi Racing	Holden Commodore (VE)	1:24.8808	—N/a
29	14	(Australia) Cameron McConville	Brad Jones Racing	Holden Commodore (VE)	no time	—N/a

=== Top ten shootout ===
Pos	No	Name	Team	Vehicle	Time
1	1	(Australia) Jamie Whincup	Triple Eight Race Engineering	Ford Falcon (FG)	1:21.8123
2	888	(Australia) Craig Lowndes	Triple Eight Race Engineering	Ford Falcon (FG)	1:22.0668
3	2	(Australia) Garth Tander	Holden Racing Team	Holden Commodore (VE)	1:22.1887
4	18	(Australia) James Courtney	Dick Johnson Racing	Ford Falcon (FG)	1:22.3369
5	111	(New Zealand) Fabian Coulthard	Paul Cruickshank Racing	Ford Falcon (FG)	1:22.3919
6	10	(Australia) Paul Dumbrell	Walkinshaw Racing	Holden Commodore (VE)	1:22.5136
7	22	(Australia) Will Davison	Holden Racing Team	Holden Commodore (VE)	1:22.7285
8	8	(New Zealand) Jason Richards	Brad Jones Racing	Holden Commodore (VE)	1:25.4188
	5	(Australia) Mark Winterbottom	Ford Performance Racing	Ford Falcon (FG)	no time
	33	(Australia) Lee Holdsworth	Garry Rogers Motorsport	Holden Commodore (VE)	no time

=== Race 1 ===
Pos	No	Name	Team	Vehicle	Laps	Time/Retired	Grid	Points
1	1	(Australia) Jamie Whincup	Triple Eight Race Engineering	Ford Falcon (FG)	78	1:59:06.5279	1	150
2	33	(Australia) Lee Holdsworth	Garry Rogers Motorsport	Holden Commodore (VE)	78	+ 14.027	10	138
3	22	(Australia) Will Davison	Holden Racing Team	Holden Commodore (VE)	78	+ 26.076	7	129
4	17	(Australia) Steven Johnson	Dick Johnson Racing	Ford Falcon (FG)	78	+ 28.928	14	120
5	8	(New Zealand) Jason Richards	Brad Jones Racing	Holden Commodore (VE)	78	+ 30.516	8	111
6	9	(New Zealand) Shane van Gisbergen	Stone Brothers Racing	Ford Falcon (FG)	78	+ 35.910	12	102
7	7	(Australia) Todd Kelly	Kelly Racing	Holden Commodore (VE)	78	+ 36.301	24	96
8	39	(Australia) Russell Ingall	Paul Morris Motorsport	Holden Commodore (VE)	78	+ 41.498	16	90
9	14	(Australia) Cameron McConville	Brad Jones Racing	Holden Commodore (VE)	78	+ 43.158	29	84
10	15	(Australia) Rick Kelly	Kelly Racing	Holden Commodore (VE)	78	+ 47.562	17	78
11	111	(New Zealand) Fabian Coulthard	Paul Cruickshank Racing	Ford Falcon (FG)	78	+ 48.674	5	72
12	25	(Australia) Jason Bright	Stone Brothers Racing	Ford Falcon (BF)	78	+ 52.992	13	69
13	24	(Australia) David Reynolds	Walkinshaw Racing	Holden Commodore (VE)	78	+ 1:07.570	22	66
14	16	(Australia) Dale Wood	Kelly Racing	Holden Commodore (VE)	78	+ 1:14.666	30	63
15	4	(Australia) Alex Davison	Stone Brothers Racing	Ford Falcon (FG)	77	+ 1 lap	26	60
16	021	(Australia) Dean Fiore	Team Kiwi Racing	Holden Commodore (VE)	76	+ 2 laps	28	57
17	10	(Australia) Paul Dumbrell	Walkinshaw Racing	Holden Commodore (VE)	76	+ 2 laps	6	54
18	5	(Australia) Mark Winterbottom	Ford Performance Racing	Ford Falcon (FG)	76	+ 2 laps	9	51
19	888	(Australia) Craig Lowndes	Triple Eight Race Engineering	Ford Falcon (FG)	75	+ 3 laps	2	48
20	18	(Australia) James Courtney	Dick Johnson Racing	Ford Falcon (FG)	70	+ 8 laps	4	45
Ret	2	(Australia) Garth Tander	Holden Racing Team	Holden Commodore (VE)	67	Power steering	3	
Ret	6	(New Zealand) Steven Richards	Ford Performance Racing	Ford Falcon (FG)	65	Retired	11	
Ret	3	(Australia) Jason Bargwanna	Tasman Motorsport	Holden Commodore (VE)	65	Retired	23	
Ret	77	(Australia) Marcus Marshall	Marcus Marshall Motorsport	Ford Falcon (BF)	54	Retired	21	
Ret	67	(Australia) Tim Slade	Paul Morris Motorsport	Holden Commodore (VE)	48	Retired	19	
Ret	51	(New Zealand) Greg Murphy	Tasman Motorsport	Holden Commodore (VE)	34	Retired	18	
Ret	11	(Australia) Jack Perkins	Kelly Racing	Holden Commodore (VE)	27	Retired	25	
Ret	333	(Australia) Michael Patrizi	Paul Cruickshank Racing	Ford Falcon (BF)	12	Retired	27	
Ret	34	(Australia) Michael Caruso	Garry Rogers Motorsport	Holden Commodore (VE)	7	Accident	15	
Ret	55	(Australia) Tony D'Alberto	Rod Nash Racing	Holden Commodore (VE)	0	Retired	20	
Fastest Lap: Jamie Whincup (Triple Eight Race Engineering) - 1:23.0017 on lap 25

=== Race 2 ===
Pos	No	Name	Team	Vehicle	Laps	Time/retired	Grid	Points
1	1	(Australia) Jamie Whincup	Triple Eight Race Engineering	Ford Falcon (FG)	78	2:00:39.5887	1	150
2	22	(Australia) Will Davison	Holden Racing Team	Holden Commodore (VE)	78	+ 0.748	7	138
3	2	(Australia) Garth Tander	Holden Racing Team	Holden Commodore (VE)	78	+ 4.396	3	129
4	888	(Australia) Craig Lowndes	Triple Eight Race Engineering	Ford Falcon (FG)	78	+ 4.856	2	120
5	33	(Australia) Lee Holdsworth	Garry Rogers Motorsport	Holden Commodore (VE)	78	+ 6.876	10	111
6	17	(Australia) Steven Johnson	Dick Johnson Racing	Ford Falcon (FG)	78	+ 8.661	14	102
7	8	(New Zealand) Jason Richards	Brad Jones Racing	Holden Commodore (VE)	78	+ 14.784	8	96
8	51	(New Zealand) Greg Murphy	Tasman Motorsport	Holden Commodore (VE)	78	+ 15.610	29	90
9	6	(New Zealand) Steven Richards	Ford Performance Racing	Ford Falcon (FG)	78	+ 16.164	12	84
10	15	(Australia) Rick Kelly	Kelly Racing	Holden Commodore (VE)	78	+ 21.215	17	78
11	25	(Australia) Jason Bright	Britek Motorsport	Ford Falcon (BF)	78	+ 21.834	13	72
12	111	(Australia) Fabian Coulthard	Paul Cruickshank Racing	Ford Falcon (FG)	78	+ 22.313	5	69
13	9	(New Zealand) Shane van Gisbergen	Stone Brothers Racing	Ford Falcon (FG)	78	+ 24.348	12	66
14	77	(Australia) Marcus Marshall	Marcus Marshall Motorsport	Ford Falcon (BF)	78	+ 24.940	20	63
15	39	(Australia) Russell Ingall	Paul Morris Motorsport	Holden Commodore (VE)	78	+ 26.535	16	60
16	34	(Australia) Michael Caruso	Garry Rogers Motorsport	Holden Commodore (VE)	78	+ 27.964	15	57
17	10	(Australia) Paul Dumbrell	Walkinshaw Racing	Holden Commodore (VE)	78	+ 43.888	6	54
18	021	(Australia) Dean Fiore	Team Kiwi Racing	Holden Commodore (VE)	78	+ 53.467	27	51
19	333	(Australia) Michael Patrizi	Paul Cruickshank Racing	Ford Falcon (BF)	78	+ 1:05.950	26	48
20	3	(Australia) Jason Bargwanna	Tasman Motorsport	Holden Commodore (VE)	76	+ 2 laps	22	45
21	14	(Australia) Cameron McConville	Brad Jones Racing	Holden Commodore (VE)	76	+ 2 laps	28	42
22	5	(Australia) Mark Winterbottom	Ford Performance Racing	Ford Falcon (FG)	68	+ 10 laps	9	39
23	55	(Australia) Tony D'Alberto	Rod Nash Racing	Holden Commodore (VE)	67	+ 11 laps	19	36
24	18	(Australia) James Courtney	Dick Johnson Racing	Ford Falcon (FG)	63	+ 15 laps	4	33
25	4	(Australia) Alex Davison	Stone Brothers Racing	Ford Falcon (FG)	62	+ 16 laps	25	30
Ret	7	(Australia) Todd Kelly	Kelly Racing	Holden Commodore (VE)	69	Retired	23	
Ret	24	(Australia) David Reynolds	Walkinshaw Racing	Holden Commodore (VE)	68	Retired	21	
Ret	16	(Australia) Dale Wood	Kelly Racing	Holden Commodore (VE)	57	Retired	30	
Ret	67	(Australia) Tim Slade	Paul Morris Motorsport	Holden Commodore (VE)	22	Retired	18	
Ret	11	(Australia) Jack Perkins	Kelly Racing	Holden Commodore (VE)	0	Retired	24	
Fastest Lap: Craig Lowndes (Triple Eight Race Engineering) - 1:22.3221 on lap 48

== Post-race ==
Russell Ingall and James Courtney were given ten-point deductions after the weekend for careless driving.

== Standings ==
- After Round 1 of 14

Pos	No	Name	Team	Points
1	1	(Australia) Jamie Whincup	Triple Eight Race Engineering	300
2	22	(Australia) Will Davison	Holden Racing Team	267
3	33	(Australia) Lee Holdsworth	Garry Rogers Motorsport	249
4	17	(Australia) Steven Johnson	Dick Johnson Racing	222
5	8	(New Zealand) Jason Richards	Brad Jones Racing	207
