= 2009 Darwin Triple Crown =

2009 Supercar Championship event

(Northern Territory) 2009 Skycity Triple Crown
Event Information
- Round 5 of 14 in the 2009 V8 Supercar Championship Series
- Date: 19–21 June 2009
- Location: Darwin, Northern Territory
- Venue: Hidden Valley Raceway
- Weather: Fine

Results
Race 1
Distance	34 laps	100 km
Pole position	Jason Richards; Brad Jones Racing	1:09.4908
Winner	Jamie Whincup; Triple Eight Race Engineering	41:09.7792
Race 2
Distance	69 laps	200 km
Pole position	Garth Tander; Holden Racing Team	1:09.7929
Winner	Michael Caruso; Garry Rogers Motorsport	1:25:24.6054

The 2009 Darwin Triple Crown (known for naming rights reasons as the 2009 SkyCity Triple Crown) was the fifth round of the 2009 V8 Supercar Championship Series. It was the 12th V8 Supercar event to be held at Hidden Valley Raceway and was held on the weekend of 19 to 21 June in Darwin, Northern Territory.

Jamie Whincup continued to assert his stranglehold over the championship by winning the first race of the weekend in dominant fashion over Mark Winterbottom. The Sunday race delivered an unexpected result with Michael Caruso of Garry Rogers Motorsport claiming his sole V8 Supercar race victory, closely followed to the line by Alex Davison. Additionally, Jason Richards would claim his only V8 Supercar pole position ahead of the weekends first race.

== Background ==
The event was held on the weekend of 19 to 21 June 2009. It was the 12th ATCC/V8 Supercar event to be held at Hidden Valley Raceway, and consisted of one 100 kilometre race held as Race 9 on Saturday, with a 200 kilometre race held on Sunday as Race 10.

=== Entry list ===
There were 30 drivers entered into this event. 18 drivers would compete in a VE Holden Commodore while nine drivers would utilise the FG Ford Falcon and three would remain with the BF Ford Falcon.

=== Support categories ===
Category	Races	Round winner
Australian V8 Ute Racing Series	3	(Australia) Grant Johnson (Holden Commodore VE Ute)
Australian Formula Ford Championship	3	(Australia) Nick Percat (Mygale SJ07A)
Touring Car Masters	3	(Australia) Gavin Bullas (1969 Ford Boss Mustang)
Improved Production/Commmodore Cup/HQ Holden	4	(Australia) Adam Uebergang (Mazda 3)

== Race report ==
=== Race 9 ===
The first race was held on Saturday 20 June. Tander started well from third grid position to move past polesitter Jason Richards and settled to chase leader Whincup. Jack Perkins was an early retirement with bent steering. Lowndes was the first of the front running cars to pit on lap 7. Tander lost ground during the pitstops, falling behind teammate Davison, and when Jason Richards vaulted past after his later stop.

With the stops completed, Whincup held a clear lead over a tight group of Jason Richards, Mark Winterbottom, Will Davison and Garth Tander. Late in the race with car condition falling away Jason Richards speared off the track at the end of the front straight, dropping behind the HRT pair then lost position to Todd Kelly and Craig Lowndes and kept James Courtney out of seventh position by just a single hundredth of a second.

=== Race 10 ===
Race 2 was held on Sunday 21 June.

== Race results ==
=== Race 9 ===
==== Qualifying ====
Pos	No	Name	Team	Vehicle	Qual 1	Qual 2
1	8	(New Zealand) Jason Richards	Brad Jones Racing	Holden Commodore (VE)		1:09.3342
2	7	(Australia) Todd Kelly	Kelly Racing	Holden Commodore (VE)		1:09.3957
3	888	(Australia) Craig Lowndes	Triple Eight Race Engineering	Ford Falcon (FG)		1:09.4886
4	33	(Australia) Lee Holdsworth	Garry Rogers Motorsport	Holden Commodore (VE)		1:09.5438
5	5	(Australia) Mark Winterbottom	Ford Performance Racing	Ford Falcon (FG)		1:09.6319
6	2	(Australia) Garth Tander	Holden Racing Team	Holden Commodore (VE)		1:09.6419
7	10	(Australia) Paul Dumbrell	Walkinshaw Racing	Holden Commodore (VE)		1:09.6568
8	22	(Australia) Will Davison	Holden Racing Team	Holden Commodore (VE)		1:09.6937
9	1	(Australia) Jamie Whincup	Triple Eight Race Engineering	Ford Falcon (FG)		1:09.7060
10	14	(Australia) Cameron McConville	Brad Jones Racing	Holden Commodore (VE)		1:09.7876
11	25	(Australia) Jason Bright	Britek Motorsport	Ford Falcon (BF)		1:09.7938
12	39	(Australia) Russell Ingall	Paul Morris Motorsport	Holden Commodore (VE)		1:09.8067
13	18	(Australia) James Courtney	Dick Johnson Racing	Ford Falcon (FG)		1:09.8214
14	111	(New Zealand) Fabian Coulthard	Paul Cruickshank Racing	Ford Falcon (FG)		1:09.8623
15	17	(Australia) Steven Johnson	Dick Johnson Racing	Ford Falcon (FG)		1:09.8656
16	24	(Australia) David Reynolds	Walkinshaw Racing	Holden Commodore (VE)		1:09.8787
17	34	(Australia) Michael Caruso	Garry Rogers Motorsport	Holden Commodore (VE)		1:09.8802
18	15	(Australia) Rick Kelly	Kelly Racing	Holden Commodore (VE)		1:09.9567
19	51	(New Zealand) Greg Murphy	Tasman Motorsport	Holden Commodore (VE)		1:10.0214
20	3	(Australia) Jason Bargwanna	Tasman Motorsport	Holden Commodore (VE)		excluded
21	11	(Australia) Jack Perkins	Kelly Racing	Holden Commodore (VE)	1:10.2578	—N/a
22	6	(New Zealand) Steven Richards	Ford Performance Racing	Ford Falcon (FG)	1:10.2648	—N/a
23	9	(New Zealand) Shane van Gisbergen	Stone Brothers Racing	Ford Falcon (FG)	1:10.2691	—N/a
24	67	(Australia) Tim Slade	Paul Morris Motorsport	Holden Commodore (VE)	1:10.2906	—N/a
25	55	(Australia) Tony D'Alberto	Rod Nash Racing	Holden Commodore (VE)	1:10.3115	—N/a
26	77	(Australia) Marcus Marshall	Marcus Marshall Motorsport	Ford Falcon (BF)	1:10.3972	—N/a
27	333	(Australia) Michael Patrizi	Paul Cruickshank Racing	Ford Falcon (BF)	1:10.4910	—N/a
28	16	(Australia) Dale Wood	Kelly Racing	Holden Commodore (VE)	1:10.7397	—N/a
29	12	(Australia) Dean Fiore	Triple F Racing	Holden Commodore (VE)	1:10.9267	—N/a
30	4	(Australia) Alex Davison	Stone Brothers Racing	Ford Falcon (FG)	1:11.3752	—N/a

==== Top ten shootout ====
Pos	No	Name	Team	Vehicle	Time
1	8	(New Zealand) Jason Richards	Brad Jones Racing	Holden Commodore (VE)	1:09.4908
2	1	(Australia) Jamie Whincup	Triple Eight Race Engineering	Ford Falcon (FG)	1:09.5423
3	2	(Australia) Garth Tander	Holden Racing Team	Holden Commodore (VE)	1:09.5595
4	888	(Australia) Craig Lowndes	Triple Eight Race Engineering	Ford Falcon (FG)	1:09.6173
5	7	(Australia) Todd Kelly	Kelly Racing	Holden Commodore (VE)	1:09.7586
6	5	(Australia) Mark Winterbottom	Ford Performance Racing	Ford Falcon (FG)	1:09.7629
7	33	(Australia) Lee Holdsworth	Garry Rogers Motorsport	Holden Commodore (VE)	1:09.9014
8	10	(Australia) Paul Dumbrell	Walkinshaw Racing	Holden Commodore (VE)	1:10.0040
9	22	(Australia) Will Davison	Holden Racing Team	Holden Commodore (VE)	1:10.0608
10	14	(Australia) Cameron McConville	Brad Jones Racing	Holden Commodore (VE)	1:10.3382

==== Race ====
Pos	No	Name	Team	Vehicle	Laps	Time/Retired	Grid	Points
1	1	(Australia) Jamie Whincup	Triple Eight Race Engineering	Ford Falcon (FG)	34	41:09.7792	2	150
2	5	(Australia) Mark Winterbottom	Ford Performance Racing	Ford Falcon (FG)	34	+ 14.199	6	138
3	22	(Australia) Will Davison	Holden Racing Team	Holden Commodore (VE)	34	+ 15.494	9	129
4	2	(Australia) Garth Tander	Holden Racing Team	Holden Commodore (VE)	34	+ 15.959	3	120
5	7	(Australia) Todd Kelly	Kelly Racing	Holden Commodore (VE)	34	+ 19.627	5	111
6	888	(Australia) Craig Lowndes	Triple Eight Race Engineering	Ford Falcon (FG)	34	+ 22.248	4	102
7	8	(New Zealand) Jason Richards	Brad Jones Racing	Holden Commodore (VE)	34	+ 22.963	1	96
8	18	(Australia) James Courtney	Dick Johnson Racing	Ford Falcon (FG)	34	+ 22.973	13	90
9	14	(Australia) Cameron McConville	Brad Jones Racing	Holden Commodore (VE)	34	+ 23.081	10	84
10	33	(Australia) Lee Holdsworth	Garry Rogers Motorsport	Holden Commodore (VE)	34	+ 23.849	7	78
11	34	(Australia) Michael Caruso	Garry Rogers Motorsport	Holden Commodore (VE)	34	+ 32.650	17	72
12	111	(New Zealand) Fabian Coulthard	Paul Cruickshank Racing	Ford Falcon (FG)	34	+ 33.299	14	69
13	39	(Australia) Russell Ingall	Paul Morris Motorsport	Holden Commodore (VE)	34	+ 36.820	12	66
14	10	(Australia) Paul Dumbrell	Walkinshaw Racing	Holden Commodore (VE)	34	+ 45.048	8	63
15	15	(Australia) Rick Kelly	Kelly Racing	Holden Commodore (VE)	34	+ 48.975	18	60
16	25	(Australia) Jason Bright	Britek Motorsport	Ford Falcon (BF)	34	+ 49.920	11	57
17	17	(Australia) Steven Johnson	Dick Johnson Racing	Ford Falcon (FG)	34	+ 56.684	15	54
18	24	(Australia) David Reynolds	Walkinshaw Racing	Holden Commodore (VE)	34	+ 1:00.149	16	51
19	4	(Australia) Alex Davison	Stone Brothers Racing	Ford Falcon (FG)	34	+ 1:00.663	30	48
20	9	(New Zealand) Shane van Gisbergen	Stone Brothers Racing	Ford Falcon (FG)	34	+ 1:01.102	23	45
21	6	(New Zealand) Steven Richards	Ford Performance Racing	Ford Falcon (FG)	34	+ 1:01.617	22	42
22	3	(Australia) Jason Bargwanna	Tasman Motorsport	Holden Commodore (VE)	34	+ 1:03.524	20	39
23	51	(New Zealand) Greg Murphy	Tasman Motorsport	Holden Commodore (VE)	34	+ 1:06.903	19	36
24	333	(Australia) Michael Patrizi	Paul Cruickshank Racing	Ford Falcon (BF)	33	+ 1 lap	27	33
25	16	(Australia) Dale Wood	Kelly Racing	Holden Commodore (VE)	33	+ 1 lap	28	30
26	55	(Australia) Tony D'Alberto	Rod Nash Racing	Holden Commodore (VE)	33	+ 1 lap	25	27
27	67	(Australia) Tim Slade	Paul Morris Motorsport	Holden Commodore (VE)	33	+ 1 lap	24	24
28	77	(Australia) Marcus Marshall	Marcus Marshall Motorsport	Ford Falcon (BF)	33	+ 1 lap	26	21
29	12	(Australia) Dean Fiore	Triple F Racing	Holden Commodore (VE)	33	+ 1 lap	29	18
Ret	11	(Australia) Jack Perkins	Kelly Racing	Holden Commodore (VE)	1	Steering	21	
Fastest Lap: Garth Tander (Holden Racing Team) - 1:09.6076 on lap 2

=== Race 10 ===
==== Qualifying ====
Pos	No	Name	Team	Vehicle	Time
1	2	(Australia) Garth Tander	Holden Racing Team	Holden Commodore (VE)	1:09.7929
2	888	(Australia) Craig Lowndes	Triple Eight Race Engineering	Holden Commodore (VE)	1:09.9048
3	5	(Australia) Mark Winterbottom	Ford Performance Racing	Ford Falcon (FG)	1:09.9654
4	7	(Australia) Todd Kelly	Kelly Racing	Holden Commodore (VE)	1:10.0482
5	33	(Australia) Lee Holdsworth	Garry Rogers Motorsport	Holden Commodore (VE)	1:10.1000
6	34	(Australia) Michael Caruso	Garry Rogers Motorsport	Holden Commodore (VE)	1:10.1132
7	22	(Australia) Will Davison	Holden Racing Team	Holden Commodore (VE)	1:10.1132
8	18	(Australia) James Courtney	Dick Johnson Racing	Ford Falcon (FG)	1:10.1368
9	15	(Australia) Rick Kelly	Kelly Racing	Holden Commodore (VE)	1:10.1558
10	4	(Australia) Alex Davison	Stone Brothers Racing	Ford Falcon (FG)	1:10.1975
11	14	(Australia) Cameron McConville	Brad Jones Racing	Holden Commodore (VE)	1:10.2399
12	10	(Australia) Paul Dumbrell	Walkinshaw Racing	Holden Commodore (VE)	1:10.2527
13	1	(Australia) Jamie Whincup	Triple Eight Race Engineering	Ford Falcon (FG)	1:10.2892
14	8	(New Zealand) Jason Richards	Brad Jones Racing	Holden Commodore (VE)	1:10.3096
15	3	(Australia) Jason Bargwanna	Tasman Motorsport	Holden Commodore (VE)	1:10.3348
16	25	(Australia) Jason Bright	Britek Motorsport	Ford Falcon (BF)	1:10.3392
17	39	(Australia) Russell Ingall	Paul Morris Motorsport	Holden Commodore (VE)	1:10.3745
18	24	(Australia) David Reynolds	Walkinshaw Racing	Holden Commodore (VE)	1:10.3958
19	77	(Australia) Marcus Marshall	Marcus Marshall Motorsport	Ford Falcon (BF)	1:10.4221
20	111	(New Zealand) Fabian Coulthard	Paul Cruickshank Racing	Ford Falcon (FG)	1:10.5102
21	9	(New Zealand) Shane van Gisbergen	Stone Brothers Racing	Ford Falcon (FG)	1:10.5646
22	17	(Australia) Steven Johnson	Dick Johnson Racing	Ford Falcon (FG)	1:10.5876
23	6	(New Zealand) Steven Richards	Ford Performance Racing	Ford Falcon (FG)	1:10.6432
24	55	(Australia) Tony D'Alberto	Rod Nash Racing	Holden Commodore (VE)	1:10.7197
25	51	(New Zealand) Greg Murphy	Tasman Motorsport	Holden Commodore (VE)	1:10.7351
26	333	(Australia) Michael Patrizi	Paul Cruickshank Racing	Ford Falcon (BF)	1:10.8559
27	16	(Australia) Dale Wood	Kelly Racing	Holden Commodore (VE)	1:10.8730
28	11	(Australia) Jack Perkins	Kelly Racing	Holden Commodore (VE)	1:11.0371
29	67	(Australia) Tim Slade	Paul Morris Motorsport	Holden Commodore (VE)	1:11.1272
30	12	(Australia) Dean Fiore	Triple F Racing	Holden Commodore (VE)	1:11.2888

==== Race ====
Pos	No.	Name	Team	Vehicle	Laps	Time/Retired	Grid
1	34	(Australia) Michael Caruso	Garry Rogers Motorsport	Holden Commodore (VE)	69	01:25:24.6054	6
2	4	(Australia) Alex Davison	Stone Brothers Racing	Ford Falcon (FG)	69	+ 0.608	10
3	888	(Australia) Craig Lowndes	Triple Eight Race Engineering	Ford Falcon (FG)	69	+ 3.196	2
4	15	(Australia) Rick Kelly	Kelly Racing	Holden Commodore (VE)	69	+ 8.774	9
5	2	(Australia) Garth Tander	Holden Racing Team	Holden Commodore (VE)	69	+ 9.328	1
6	10	(Australia) Paul Dumbrell	Walkinshaw Racing	Holden Commodore (VE)	69	+ 10.002	12
7	33	(Australia) Lee Holdsworth	Garry Rogers Motorsport	Holden Commodore (VE)	69	+ 11.910	5
8	39	(Australia) Russell Ingall	Paul Morris Motorsport	Holden Commodore (VE)	69	+ 12.923	17
9	9	(New Zealand) Shane van Gisbergen	Stone Brothers Racing	Ford Falcon (FG)	69	+ 15.209	21
10	1	(Australia) Jamie Whincup	Triple Eight Race Engineering	Ford Falcon (FG)	69	+ 15.716	13
11	8	(New Zealand) Jason Richards	Brad Jones Racing	Holden Commodore (VE)	69	+ 16.166	14
12	18	(Australia) James Courtney	Dick Johnson Racing	Ford Falcon (FG)	69	+ 18.120	8
13	17	(Australia) Steven Johnson	Dick Johnson Racing	Ford Falcon (FG)	69	+ 19.947	22
14	6	(New Zealand) Steven Richards	Ford Performance Racing	Ford Falcon (FG)	69	+ 24.253	23
15	333	(Australia) Michael Patrizi	Paul Cruickshank Racing	Ford Falcon (BF)	69	+ 24.670	26
16	77	(Australia) Marcus Marshall	Marcus Marshall Motorsport	Ford Falcon (BF)	69	+ 25.184	19
17	5	(Australia) Mark Winterbottom	Ford Performance Racing	Ford Falcon (FG)	69	+ 26.105	3
18	22	(Australia) Will Davison	Holden Racing Team	Holden Commodore (VE)	69	+ 34.474	7
19	25	(Australia) Jason Bright	Britek Motorsport	Ford Falcon (BF)	69	+ 34.513	16
20	111	(New Zealand) Fabian Coulthard	Paul Cruickshank Racing	Ford Falcon (FG)	68	+ 1 lap	20
21	51	(New Zealand) Greg Murphy	Tasman Motorsport	Holden Commodore (VE)	68	+ 1 lap	25
22	16	(Australia) Dale Wood	Kelly Racing	Holden Commodore (VE)	68	+ 1 lap	27
23	14	(Australia) Cameron McConville	Brad Jones Racing	Holden Commodore (VE)	68	+ 1 lap	11
24	11	(Australia) Jack Perkins	Kelly Racing	Holden Commodore (VE)	68	+ 1 lap	28
25	67	(Australia) Tim Slade	Paul Morris Motorsport	Holden Commodore (VE)	67	+ 2 laps	29
26	12	(Australia) Dean Fiore	Triple F Racing	Holden Commodore (VE)	66	+ 3 laps	30
27	24	(Australia) David Reynolds	Walkinshaw Racing	Holden Commodore (VE)	59	+ 10 laps	18
28	7	(Australia) Todd Kelly	Kelly Racing	Holden Commodore (VE)	54	+ 15 laps	4
Ret	55	(Australia) Tony D'Alberto	Rod Nash Racing	Holden Commodore (VE)	35	Retired	24
Ret	3	(Australia) Jason Bargwanna	Tasman Motorsport	Holden Commodore (VE)	34	Retired	15
Fastest Lap: Alex Davison (Stone Brothers Racing) - 1:09.5276 on lap 56

== Championship standings ==
- After round 5 of 14

Pos	No.	Name	Team	Points
1	1	(Australia) Jamie Whincup	Triple Eight Race Engineering	1272
2	22	(Australia) Will Davison	Holden Racing Team	1128
3	2	(Australia) Garth Tander	Holden Racing Team	954
4	888	(Australia) Craig Lowndes	Triple Eight Race Engineering	906
5	33	(Australia) Lee Holdsworth	Garry Rogers Motorsport	897
