= 2009 V8 Supercars Winton round =

2009 Supercar Championship event

(Victoria (state)) 2009 Winton V8 Supercar round
Event Information
- Round 3 of 14 in the 2009 V8 Supercar Championship Series
- Date: 1–3 May 2009
- Location: Benalla, Victoria
- Venue: Winton Motor Raceway
- Weather: Fine

Results
Race 1
Distance	33 laps	100 km
Pole position	Mark Winterbottom; Ford Performance Racing	1:23.0906
Winner	Craig Lowndes; Triple Eight Race Engineering	49:26.6167
Race 2
Distance	66 laps	200 km
Pole position	Jamie Whincup; Triple Eight Race Engineering	1:23.1687
Winner	Craig Lowndes; Triple Eight Race Engineering	1:37:06.3464

The 2009 V8 Supercars Winton round was the third round of the 2009 V8 Supercar Championship Series. It was the 22nd ATCC/V8 Supercar event to be held at Winton Motor Raceway and was held on the weekend of 1 to 3 May in Benalla, Victoria.

An decisive strategic call by Triple Eight Race Engineering helped Craig Lowndes secure his first victory of 2009 in race one. Lowndes would once again use tyres to his advantage to take victory in the second race on Sunday. Teammate and championship leader Jamie Whincup finished second in race one and claimed pole position for the second race. However, an issue in pitlane ultimately curtailed his campaign.

== Background ==
The event was held on the weekend of 17 to 19 April 2009. It was the 22nd ATCC/V8 Supercar event to be held at Winton Motor Raceway, and consisted of one 100 kilometre race held as Race 5 on Saturday, with a 200 kilometre race held on Sunday as Race 6.

=== Entry list ===
There were 30 drivers entered into this event. 18 drivers would compete in a VE Holden Commodore while nine drivers would utilise the FG Ford Falcon and three would remain with the BF Ford Falcon.

Team Kiwi Racing folded after the previous round in Hamilton and the licences were purchased by the Fiore family who founded Triple F Racing which would compete for the rest of the season.

=== Support categories ===
Category	Races	Round winner
Fujitsu V8 Supercar Series	3	(Australia) Jonathon Webb (Ford Falcon (BF))
Australian V8 Ute Racing Series	3	(Australia) Jack Elsegood (Ford Falcon BF Ute)
Australian Formula Ford Championship	3	(Australia) Nick Percat (Mygale SJ07A)
Touring Car Masters	3	(Australia) Gavin Bullas (1969 Ford Boss Mustang)

== Race results ==
=== Race 5 ===
==== Qualifying ====
Pos	No	Name	Team	Vehicle	Qual 1	Qual 2
1	888	(Australia) Craig Lowndes	Triple Eight Race Engineering	Ford Falcon (FG)		1:23.3646
2	6	(New Zealand) Steven Richards	Ford Performance Racing	Ford Falcon (FG)		1:23.4261
3	1	(Australia) Jamie Whincup	Triple Eight Race Engineering	Ford Falcon (FG)		1:23.4457
4	33	(Australia) Lee Holdsworth	Garry Rogers Motorsport	Holden Commodore (VE)		1:23.4474
5	18	(Australia) James Courtney	Dick Johnson Racing	Ford Falcon (FG)		1:23.4825
6	5	(Australia) Mark Winterbottom	Ford Performance Racing	Ford Falcon (FG)		1:23.5171
7	111	(New Zealand) Fabian Coulthard	Paul Cruickshank Racing	Ford Falcon (FG)		1:23.5494
8	34	(Australia) Michael Caruso	Garry Rogers Motorsport	Holden Commodore (VE)		1:23.6167
9	2	(Australia) Garth Tander	Holden Racing Team	Holden Commodore (VE)		1:23.7006
10	7	(Australia) Todd Kelly	Kelly Racing	Holden Commodore (VE)		1:23.7100
11	15	(Australia) Rick Kelly	Kelly Racing	Holden Commodore (VE)		1:23.7797
12	14	(Australia) Cameron McConville	Brad Jones Racing	Holden Commodore (VE)		1:23.8041
13	17	(Australia) Steven Johnson	Dick Johnson Racing	Ford Falcon (FG)		1:23.8116
14	39	(Australia) Russell Ingall	Paul Morris Motorsport	Holden Commodore (VE)		1:23.8357
15	8	(New Zealand) Jason Richards	Brad Jones Racing	Holden Commodore (VE)		1:23.8737
16	10	(Australia) Paul Dumbrell	Walkinshaw Racing	Holden Commodore (VE)		1:23.9062
17	25	(Australia) Jason Bright	Britek Motorsport	Ford Falcon (BF)		1:23.9167
18	11	(Australia) Jack Perkins	Kelly Racing	Holden Commodore (VE)		1:24.0492
19	24	(Australia) David Reynolds	Walkinshaw Racing	Holden Commodore (VE)		1:24.0550
20	77	(Australia) Marcus Marshall	Marcus Marshall Motorsport	Ford Falcon (BF)		1:24.1010
21	55	(Australia) Tony D'Alberto	Rod Nash Racing	Holden Commodore (VE)	1:24.4634	—N/a
22	22	(Australia) Will Davison	Holden Racing Team	Holden Commodore (VE)	1:24.4739	—N/a
23	4	(Australia) Alex Davison	Stone Brothers Racing	Ford Falcon (FG)	1:24.5071	—N/a
24	51	(New Zealand) Greg Murphy	Tasman Motorsport	Holden Commodore (VE)	1:24.5288	—N/a
25	333	(Australia) Michael Patrizi	Paul Cruickshank Racing	Ford Falcon (BF)	1:24.5779	—N/a
26	67	(Australia) Tim Slade	Paul Morris Motorsport	Holden Commodore (VE)	1:24.8011	—N/a
27	9	(New Zealand) Shane van Gisbergen	Stone Brothers Racing	Ford Falcon (FG)	1:24.8545	—N/a
28	16	(Australia) Dale Wood	Kelly Racing	Holden Commodore (VE)	1:25.0177	—N/a
29	3	(Australia) Jason Bargwanna	Tasman Motorsport	Holden Commodore (VE)	1:25.5126	—N/a
30	021	(Australia) Dean Fiore	Triple F Racing	Holden Commodore (VE)	1:25.7421	—N/a

==== Top ten shootout ====
Pos	No	Name	Team	Vehicle	Time
1	5	(Australia) Mark Winterbottom	Ford Performance Racing	Ford Falcon (FG)	1:23.0906
2	2	(Australia) Garth Tander	Holden Racing Team	Holden Commodore (VE)	1:23.1564
3	888	(Australia) Craig Lowndes	Triple Eight Race Engineering	Ford Falcon (FG)	1:23.1677
4	1	(Australia) Jamie Whincup	Triple Eight Race Engineering	Ford Falcon (FG)	1:23.4585
5	111	(New Zealand) Fabian Coulthard	Paul Cruickshank Racing	Ford Falcon (FG)	1:23.4591
6	34	(Australia) Michael Caruso	Garry Rogers Motorsport	Holden Commodore (VE)	1:23.5985
7	18	(Australia) James Courtney	Dick Johnson Racing	Ford Falcon (FG)	1:23.6198
8	33	(Australia) Lee Holdsworth	Garry Rogers Motorsport	Holden Commodore (VE)	1:23.6836
9	7	(Australia) Todd Kelly	Kelly Racing	Holden Commodore (VE)	1:23.7534
10	6	(New Zealand) Steven Richards	Ford Performance Racing	Ford Falcon (FG)	1:23.8460

==== Race ====
Pos	No.	Name	Team	Vehicle	Laps	Time/Retired	Grid
1	888	(Australia) Craig Lowndes	Triple Eight Race Engineering	Ford Falcon (FG)	33	49:26.6167	3
2	1	(Australia) Jamie Whincup	Triple Eight Race Engineering	Ford Falcon (FG)	33	+ 4.167	4
3	6	(New Zealand) Steven Richards	Ford Performance Racing	Ford Falcon (FG)	33	+ 4.387	10
4	15	(Australia) Rick Kelly	Kelly Racing	Holden Commodore (VE)	33	+ 10.083	11
5	14	(Australia) Cameron McConville	Brad Jones Racing	Holden Commodore (VE)	33	+ 10.671	12
6	9	(New Zealand) Shane van Gisbergen	Stone Brothers Racing	Ford Falcon (FG)	33	+ 14.318	27
7	22	(Australia) Will Davison	Holden Racing Team	Holden Commodore (VE)	33	+ 16.891	22
8	2	(Australia) Garth Tander	Holden Racing Team	Holden Commodore (VE)	33	+ 16.933	2
9	39	(Australia) Russell Ingall	Paul Morris Motorsport	Holden Commodore (VE)	33	+ 16.942	14
10	34	(Australia) Michael Caruso	Garry Rogers Motorsport	Holden Commodore (VE)	33	+ 18.199	6
11	55	(Australia) Tony D'Alberto	Rod Nash Racing	Holden Commodore (VE)	33	+ 20.587	21
12	17	(Australia) Steven Johnson	Dick Johnson Racing	Ford Falcon (FG)	33	+ 21.242	13
13	8	(New Zealand) Jason Richards	Brad Jones Racing	Holden Commodore (VE)	33	+ 24.077	15
14	25	(Australia) Jason Bright	Britek Motorsport	Ford Falcon (BF)	33	+ 26.177	17
15	111	(New Zealand) Fabian Coulthard	Paul Cruickshank Racing	Ford Falcon (FG)	33	+ 27.463	5
16	10	(Australia) Paul Dumbrell	Walkinshaw Racing	Holden Commodore (VE)	33	+ 27.696	16
17	77	(Australia) Marcus Marshall	Marcus Marshall Motorsport	Ford Falcon (BF)	33	+ 28.138	20
18	67	(Australia) Tim Slade	Paul Morris Motorsport	Holden Commodore (VE)	33	+ 29.112	26
19	11	(Australia) Jack Perkins	Kelly Racing	Holden Commodore (VE)	33	+ 35.517	18
20	24	(Australia) David Reynolds	Walkinshaw Racing	Holden Commodore (VE)	33	+ 40.330	19
21	4	(Australia) Alex Davison	Stone Brothers Racing	Ford Falcon (FG)	32	+ 1 lap	23
22	51	(New Zealand) Greg Murphy	Tasman Motorsport	Holden Commodore (VE)	32	+ 1 lap	24
23	33	(Australia) Lee Holdsworth	Garry Rogers Motorsport	Holden Commodore (VE)	32	+ 1 lap	8
24	16	(Australia) Dale Wood	Kelly Racing	Holden Commodore (VE)	32	+ 1 lap	28
25	5	(Australia) Mark Winterbottom	Ford Performance Racing	Ford Falcon (FG)	32	+ 1 lap	1
26	3	(Australia) Jason Bargwanna	Tasman Motorsport	Holden Commodore (VE)	30	+ 3 laps	29
Ret	021	(Australia) Dean Fiore	Triple F Racing	Holden Commodore (VE)	19	Retired	30
Ret	18	(Australia) James Courtney	Dick Johnson Racing	Ford Falcon (FG)	17	Retired	7
Ret	333	(Australia) Michael Patrizi	Paul Cruickshank Racing	Ford Falcon (BF)	6	Retired	25
Ret	7	(Australia) Todd Kelly	Kelly Racing	Holden Commodore (VE)	0	Retired	9
Fastest Lap: Garth Tander (Holden Racing Team) - 1:23.2003 on lap 13

=== Race 6 ===
==== Qualifying ====
Pos	No.	Name	Team	Vehicle	Time
1	1	(Australia) Jamie Whincup	Triple Eight Race Engineering	Ford Falcon (FG)	1:23.1687
2	5	(Australia) Mark Winterbottom	Ford Performance Racing	Ford Falcon (FG)	1:23.4086
3	888	(Australia) Craig Lowndes	Triple Eight Race Engineering	Ford Falcon (FG)	1:23.4127
4	2	(Australia) Garth Tander	Holden Racing Team	Holden Commodore (VE)	1:23.4277
5	10	(Australia) Paul Dumbrell	Walkinshaw Racing	Holden Commodore (VE)	1:23.7023
6	111	(New Zealand) Fabian Coulthard	Paul Cruickshank Racing	Ford Falcon (FG)	1:23.7118
7	33	(Australia) Lee Holdsworth	Garry Rogers Motorsport	Holden Commodore (VE)	1:23.8328
8	15	(Australia) Rick Kelly	Kelly Racing	Holden Commodore (VE)	1:23.8455
9	22	(Australia) Will Davison	Holden Racing Team	Holden Commodore (VE)	1:23.8694
10	18	(Australia) James Courtney	Dick Johnson Racing	Ford Falcon (FG)	1:23.9809
11	9	(New Zealand) Shane van Gisbergen	Stone Brothers Racing	Ford Falcon (FG)	1:23.9873
12	3	(Australia) Jason Bargwanna	Tasman Motorsport	Holden Commodore (VE)	1:23.9916
13	34	(Australia) Michael Caruso	Garry Rogers Motorsport	Holden Commodore (VE)	1:24.0331
14	6	(New Zealand) Steven Richards	Ford Performance Racing	Ford Falcon (FG)	1:24.0730
15	24	(Australia) David Reynolds	Walkinshaw Racing	Holden Commodore (VE)	1:24.0970
16	8	(New Zealand) Jason Richards	Brad Jones Racing	Holden Commodore (VE)	1:24.1145
17	7	(Australia) Todd Kelly	Kelly Racing	Holden Commodore (VE)	1:24.1479
18	17	(Australia) Steven Johnson	Dick Johnson Racing	Ford Falcon (FG)	1:24.1565
19	14	(Australia) Cameron McConville	Brad Jones Racing	Holden Commodore (VE)	1:24.1752
20	51	(New Zealand) Greg Murphy	Tasman Motorsport	Holden Commodore (VE)	1:24.2131
21	39	(Australia) Russell Ingall	Paul Morris Motorsport	Holden Commodore (VE)	1:24.2708
22	25	(Australia) Jason Bright	Britek Motorsport	Ford Falcon (BF)	1:24.2764
23	77	(Australia) Marcus Marshall	Marcus Marshall Motorsport	Ford Falcon (BF)	1:24.3286
24	4	(Australia) Alex Davison	Stone Brothers Racing	Ford Falcon (FG)	1:24.4635
25	11	(Australia) Jack Perkins	Kelly Racing	Holden Commodore (VE)	1:24.5052
26	55	(Australia) Tony D'Alberto	Rod Nash Racing	Holden Commodore (VE)	1:24.5448
27	67	(Australia) Tim Slade	Paul Morris Motorsport	Holden Commodore (VE)	1:24.5607
28	333	(Australia) Michael Patrizi	Paul Cruickshank Racing	Ford Falcon (BF)	1:24.6516
29	16	(Australia) Dale Wood	Kelly Racing	Holden Commodore (VE)	1:24.8786
30	021	(Australia) Dean Fiore	Triple F Racing	Holden Commodore (VE)	1:25.1948

==== Race ====
Pos	No.	Name	Team	Vehicle	Laps	Time/Retired	Grid
1	888	(Australia) Craig Lowndes	Triple Eight Race Engineering	Ford Falcon (FG)	66	01:37:06.3464	3
2	5	(Australia) Mark Winterbottom	Ford Performance Racing	Ford Falcon (FG)	66	+ 2.512	2
3	2	(Australia) Garth Tander	Holden Racing Team	Holden Commodore (VE)	66	+ 19.071	4
4	10	(Australia) Paul Dumbrell	Walkinshaw Racing	Holden Commodore (VE)	66	+ 20.757	5
5	22	(Australia) Will Davison	Holden Racing Team	Holden Commodore (VE)	66	+ 21.112	9
6	18	(Australia) James Courtney	Dick Johnson Racing	Ford Falcon (FG)	66	+ 24.152	10
7	15	(Australia) Rick Kelly	Kelly Racing	Holden Commodore (VE)	66	+ 44.868	8
8	24	(Australia) David Reynolds	Walkinshaw Racing	Holden Commodore (VE)	66	+ 45.115	15
9	77	(Australia) Marcus Marshall	Marcus Marshall Motorsport	Ford Falcon (BF)	66	+ 45.604	23
10	3	(Australia) Jason Bargwanna	Tasman Motorsport	Holden Commodore (VE)	66	+ 45.655	12
11	39	(Australia) Russell Ingall	Paul Morris Motorsport	Holden Commodore (VE)	66	+ 47.332	21
12	9	(New Zealand) Shane van Gisbergen	Stone Brothers Racing	Ford Falcon (FG)	66	+ 48.228	11
13	1	(Australia) Jamie Whincup	Triple Eight Race Engineering	Ford Falcon (FG)	66	+ 48.716	1
14	55	(Australia) Tony D'Alberto	Rod Nash Racing	Holden Commodore (VE)	66	+ 58.043	26
15	4	(Australia) Alex Davison	Stone Brothers Racing	Ford Falcon (FG)	66	+ 1:02.835	24
16	6	(New Zealand) Steven Richards	Ford Performance Racing	Ford Falcon (FG)	66	+ 1:04.968	14
17	67	(Australia) Tim Slade	Paul Morris Motorsport	Holden Commodore (VE)	66	+ 1:06.829	27
18	16	(Australia) Dale Wood	Kelly Racing	Holden Commodore (VE)	66	+ 1:07.019	29
19	11	(Australia) Jack Perkins	Kelly Racing	Holden Commodore (VE)	66	+ 1:11.653	25
20	51	(New Zealand) Greg Murphy	Tasman Motorsport	Holden Commodore (VE)	66	+ 1:13.625	20
21	17	(Australia) Steven Johnson	Dick Johnson Racing	Ford Falcon (FG)	66	+ 1:17.576	18
22	333	(Australia) Michael Patrizi	Paul Cruickshank Racing	Ford Falcon (BF)	66	+ 1:19.036	28
23	14	(Australia) Cameron McConville	Brad Jones Racing	Holden Commodore (VE)	66	+ 1:37.231	19
24	7	(Australia) Todd Kelly	Kelly Racing	Holden Commodore (VE)	65	+ 1 lap	17
25	021	(Australia) Dean Fiore	Triple F Racing	Holden Commodore (VE)	65	+ 1 lap	30
26	8	(New Zealand) Jason Richards	Brad Jones Racing	Holden Commodore (VE)	65	+ 1 lap	16
27	34	(Australia) Michael Caruso	Garry Rogers Motorsport	Holden Commodore (VE)	60	+ 6 laps	13
Ret	111	(New Zealand) Fabian Coulthard	Paul Cruickshank Racing	Ford Falcon (FG)	46	Retired	6
Ret	33	(Australia) Lee Holdsworth	Garry Rogers Motorsport	Holden Commodore (VE)	18	Retired	7
Ret	25	(Australia) Jason Bright	Britek Motorsport	Ford Falcon (BF)	11	Retired	22
Fastest Lap: Marcus Marshall (Marcus Marshall Motorsport) - 1:22.9813 on lap 46

== Standings ==
- After Round 3 of 14

Pos	No	Name	Team	Points
1	1	(Australia) Jamie Whincup	Triple Eight Race Engineering	804
2	22	(Australia) Will Davison	Holden Racing Team	690
3	17	(Australia) Steven Johnson	Dick Johnson Racing	573
4	33	(Australia) Lee Holdsworth	Garry Rogers Motorsport	534
5	15	(Australia) Rick Kelly	Kelly Racing	531
