= Irwin Racing =

Irwin Racing has been the sponsored identity of a number of Australian Supercars Championship teams.

Year	Team	Car	Driver
2008	Britek Motorsport	Ford Falcon BF	Marcus Marshall
2009	Stone Brothers Racing	Ford Falcon FG	Alex Davison
2010	Stone Brothers Racing	Ford Falcon FG	Alex Davison
2011	Stone Brothers Racing	Ford Falcon FG	Alex Davison
2012	Stone Brothers Racing	Ford Falcon FG	Lee Holdsworth
2013	Erebus Motorsport	Mercedes-Benz E-Class (W212)	Lee Holdsworth
2019	Team 18	Holden Commodore ZB	Mark Winterbottom
2020	Team 18	Holden Commodore ZB	Mark Winterbottom
