= 2009 V8 Supercar Championship Series =

Motor racing competition

The 2009 V8 Supercar Championship Series was the eleventh V8 Supercar Championship Series and the thirteenth series in which V8 Supercars have contested the premier Australian touring car title. It began on 19 March at the Clipsal 500 on the streets of Adelaide and ended on 6 December at the Homebush Street Circuit and consisted of 26 races over 14 events which were held in all states and the Northern Territory of Australia as well as New Zealand. The 50th Australian Touring Car Championship title was awarded to the winner of the series by the Confederation of Australian Motor Sport.

Triple Eight Race Engineering Ford driver Jamie Whincup won the Championship from Holden drivers Will Davison and Garth Tander. Championship races were also won by Craig Lowndes, Michael Caruso, James Courtney and Mark Winterbottom. The two-driver endurance races, held at the Phillip Island Grand Prix Circuit and at the Mount Panorama Circuit, Bathurst, were both won by Tander and Davison.

== Teams and drivers ==
The following teams and drivers competed in the 2009 championship.

Manufacturer	Model	Team	No.	Driver name	Rounds	Co-driver name	Rounds
Ford	Falcon BF	Britek Motorsport (SBR)	25	(Australia) Jason Bright	1–5	—N/a	
Ford	Falcon BF	Marcus Marshall Motorsport	77	(Australia) Marcus Marshall	1–6	—N/a	
Ford	Falcon BF	Paul Cruickshank Racing	333	(Australia) Michael Patrizi	1–8, 11–14	—N/a	
Ford	Falcon BF	Paul Cruickshank Racing	333	(Australia) David Wall	9–10	(Australia) Leanne Tander	9–10
Ford	Falcon FG	Triple Eight Race Engineering	1	(Australia) Jamie Whincup	1–8, 11–14	—N/a	
Ford	Falcon FG	Triple Eight Race Engineering	88	(United Kingdom) James Thompson	9–10	(Denmark) Allan Simonsen	9–10
Ford	Falcon FG	Triple Eight Race Engineering	888	(Australia) Craig Lowndes	All	(Australia) Jamie Whincup	9–10
Ford	Falcon FG	Stone Brothers Racing	4	(Australia) Alex Davison	1–8, 11–14	—N/a	
Ford	Falcon FG	Stone Brothers Racing	4	(New Zealand) John McIntyre	9–10	(New Zealand) Daniel Gaunt	9–10
Ford	Falcon FG	Stone Brothers Racing	9	(New Zealand) Shane van Gisbergen	All	(Australia) Alex Davison	9–10
Ford	Falcon FG	Ford Performance Racing	5	(Australia) Mark Winterbottom	1–8, 11–14	—N/a	
Ford	Falcon FG	Ford Performance Racing	5	(Australia) Dean Canto	9–10	(Australia) Luke Youlden	9–10
Ford	Falcon FG	Ford Performance Racing	6	(New Zealand) Steven Richards	All	(Australia) Mark Winterbottom	9–10
Ford	Falcon FG	Dick Johnson Racing	17	(Australia) Steven Johnson	All	(Australia) James Courtney	9–10
Ford	Falcon FG	Dick Johnson Racing	18	(Australia) James Courtney	1–8, 11–14	—N/a	
Ford	Falcon FG	Dick Johnson Racing	18	(Australia) Jonathon Webb	9–10	(Australia) Warren Luff	9–10
Ford	Falcon FG	Britek Motorsport (SBR)	25	(Australia) Jason Bright	6–14	(Australia) Karl Reindler	9–10
Ford	Falcon FG	Paul Cruickshank Racing	111	(New Zealand) Fabian Coulthard	All	(Australia) Michael Patrizi	9–10
Holden	Commodore VE	Holden Racing Team	2	(Australia) Garth Tander	All	(Australia) Will Davison	9–10
Holden	Commodore VE	Holden Racing Team	22	(Australia) Will Davison	1–8, 11–14	—N/a	
Holden	Commodore VE	Holden Racing Team	22	(Australia) Paul Dumbrell	9–10	(New Zealand) Craig Baird	9–10
Holden	Commodore VE	Tasman Motorsport	3	(Australia) Jason Bargwanna	All	(Australia) Mark Noske	9–10
Holden	Commodore VE	Tasman Motorsport	51	(New Zealand) Greg Murphy	All	(Australia) Mark Skaife	9–10
Holden	Commodore VE	Kelly Racing	7	(Australia) Todd Kelly	All	(Australia) Rick Kelly	9–10
Holden	Commodore VE	Kelly Racing	11	(Australia) Jack Perkins	All	(Australia) Dale Wood	9–10
Holden	Commodore VE	Kelly Racing	15	(Australia) Rick Kelly	1–8, 11–14	—N/a	
Holden	Commodore VE	Kelly Racing	15	(Australia) Nathan Pretty	9–10	(United Kingdom) Ben Collins	9–10
Holden	Commodore VE	Kelly Racing	16	(Australia) Dale Wood	1–5	—N/a	
Holden	Commodore VE	Kelly Racing	16	(Australia) Mark McNally	6–14	(Australia) Tony Ricciardello	9–10
Holden	Commodore VE	Brad Jones Racing	8	(New Zealand) Jason Richards	All	(Australia) Cameron McConville	9–10
Holden	Commodore VE	Brad Jones Racing	14	(Australia) Cameron McConville	1–8, 11–14	—N/a	
Holden	Commodore VE	Brad Jones Racing	14	(Australia) Andrew Jones	9–10	(Australia) Brad Jones	9–10
Holden	Commodore VE	Walkinshaw Racing (HRT)	10	(Australia) Paul Dumbrell	1–8, 11–14	—N/a	
Holden	Commodore VE	Walkinshaw Racing (HRT)	10	(Australia) Shane Price	9–10	(Australia) Steve Owen	9–10
Holden	Commodore VE	Walkinshaw Racing (HRT)	24	(Australia) David Reynolds	All	(United Kingdom) Andy Priaulx	9–10
Holden	Commodore VE	Team Kiwi Racing	021	(Australia) Dean Fiore	1–2	—N/a	
Holden	Commodore VE	Triple F Racing	021	(Australia) Dean Fiore	3	—N/a	
Holden	Commodore VE	Triple F Racing	12	(Australia) Dean Fiore	4–14	(Australia) Troy Bayliss	9–10
Holden	Commodore VE	Garry Rogers Motorsport	33	(Australia) Lee Holdsworth	1–8, 11–14	—N/a	
Holden	Commodore VE	Garry Rogers Motorsport	33	(Australia) Greg Ritter	9–10	(Australia) David Besnard	9–10
Holden	Commodore VE	Garry Rogers Motorsport	34	(Australia) Michael Caruso	All	(Australia) Lee Holdsworth	9–10
Holden	Commodore VE	Paul Morris Motorsport	39	(Australia) Russell Ingall	All	(Australia) Tim Slade	9
Holden	Commodore VE	Paul Morris Motorsport	39	(Australia) Russell Ingall	All	(Australia) Owen Kelly	10
Holden	Commodore VE	Paul Morris Motorsport	67	(Australia) Tim Slade	1–8, 10–14	(Australia) Paul Morris	9–10
Holden	Commodore VE	Paul Morris Motorsport	67	(Australia) Owen Kelly	9	(Australia) Paul Morris	9–10
Holden	Commodore VE	Tony D'Alberto Racing; Rod Nash Racing	55	(Australia) Tony D'Alberto	All	(Australia) Andrew Thompson	9–10
Wildcard entries
Ford	Falcon BF	Sieders Racing Team	13	—N/a	9–10	(Australia) David Sieders (Australia) Andrew Fisher	9–10
Ford	Falcon BF	MW Motorsport	21	—N/a	9–10	(Australia) Brad Lowe (Australia) Damian Assaillit	9–10
Holden	Commodore VE	Greg Murphy Racing	23	—N/a	9–10	(Australia) Sam Walter (Australia) Taz Douglas	9–10

=== Team changes ===
Ford Australia announced that from 2009, it would only offer financial support for Ford Performance Racing and Stone Brothers Racing, having previously provided funding for Triple Eight Race Engineering, Dick Johnson Racing, Britek Motorsport, Paul Cruickshank Racing and Ford Rising Stars Racing. The remaining Ford backed teams retained levels of parts and in-kind support.

Holden also announced that several teams' financial support would be cut, with Garry Rogers Motorsport, Perkins Engineering, Tasman Motorsport and Rod Nash Racing losing direct funding, although they still received technical and parts assistance. The new Kelly Racing team received the funding previously given to the HSV Dealer Team.

Paul Weel Racing shut down at the end of 2008 after failing to strike a deal to sell the team. Their remaining Racing Entitlement Contract (REC) was sold to Walkinshaw Racing

Walkinshaw Racing was set up as a satellite team of the Holden Racing Team, utilising one REC purchased from Paul Weel Racing and the dormant Romano Racing license. This was effectively Walkinshaw Performance's replacement of the HSV Dealer Team, which shut down as the Kelly family took their two RECs to set up Kelly Racing.

The second Paul Weel Racing REC, that had been leased to Ford Rising Stars Racing in 2007, was used to start a new team, Marcus Marshall Motorsport. It utilised a Triple Eight-sourced BF Falcon and equipment and was centered around former Britek Motorsport driver Marcus Marshall.

Kelly Racing was set up utilising the franchises from the defunct HSV Dealer Team and two RECs from Perkins Engineering. Todd and Rick Kelly along with Jack Perkins were also absorbed into the new team as a result.

Britek Motorsport shut down as an independent team at the end of 2007 due to the loss of Ford factory funding. Bright moved one of his RECs to Stone Brothers Racing to run as a customer car. He started the season in a BF Falcon, before switching mid-season to a new FG Falcon. The second REC was leased to Paul Cruickshank Racing as they expanded to two cars.

=== Driver changes ===
Will Davison replaced the retiring Mark Skaife at the Holden Racing Team.

James Courtney joined Steven Johnson at Dick Johnson Racing, replacing Will Davison. Will's brother Alex then replaced Courtney at Stone Brothers Racing.

Paul Dumbrell moved from the defunct HSV Dealer Team to Walkinshaw Racing. David Reynolds also made his full-time series debut as the team's second driver.

Dale Wood effectively replaced Dumbrell at Kelly Racing, as it had taken over the HSV Dealer Team.

Jason Bargwanna returned to a full-time drive, replacing Jason Richards at Tasman Motorsport. Bargwanna had spent a year on the sidelines after WPS Racing folded prior to the 2008 season. Richards was later confirmed as Andrew Jones' replacement at Brad Jones Racing as Jones stepped away from full-time driving.

Michael Patrizi joined an expanded Paul Cruickshank Racing as their second driver.

Tim Slade graduated from the Fujitsu Series to replace the retiring Paul Morris at Paul Morris Motorsport.

With the closure of Paul Weel Racing, Andrew Thompson was left without a full-time drive, and later partnered Tony D'Alberto for the endurance races.

After running a number of drivers in 2008, Team Kiwi Racing elected to run Dean Fiore.

=== Mid-season changes ===
Team Kiwi Racing finalised a deal for the 2009 season to run a Paul Morris Motorsport-built Holden Commodore. The franchise was run as a satellite entry of Paul Morris Motorsport for the first two events of the year. Due to bankruptcy proceedings against team owner David John, the team's license was revoked by the governing body V8 Supercars Australia after the Hamilton 400 and onsold to their driver Dean Fiore, who completed the season under the Triple F Racing banner. The car number was changed for Triple F's second outing from #021 to #12.

Dale Wood was replaced at Kelly Racing after the Darwin Triple Crown round by Mark McNally.

Marcus Marshall Motorsport collapsed at the Townsville round due to lack of funding and the REC was absorbed by V8 Supercars Australia. The team's equipment was sold to Triple F Racing.

For the endurance events, as both the Holden Racing Team and Walkinshaw Racing were run by Walkinshaw Performance, Paul Dumbrell joined HRT in the second car partnering Craig Baird, while Shane Price was drafted in to replace Dumbrell.

=== Wildcard entries ===
V8 Supercars Australia announced four wildcards entries into the two endurance race events (the Phillip Island 500 and Bathurst 1000). The four teams selected from those who made submissions were all competitors in the second-tier Fujitsu V8 Supercar Series, namely: Greg Murphy Racing, MW Motorsport, Sieders Racing Team and Sonic Motor Racing Services.

Greg Murphy Racing ran a VE Commodore built by their sister-team Tasman Motorsport with Fujitsu series regular Sam Walter named as one of the drivers. Taz Douglas was later named as the second driver.

The family-run Sieders Racing Team announced that they would use the 2006 Bathurst 1000-winning Triple Eight BF Falcon for brothers Colin and David Sieders. Colin later withdrew citing imminent surgery and was replaced with V8 Ute Series racer Andrew Fisher.

MW Motorsport were represented by their young up-and-coming drivers Damien Assaillit and Brad Lowe, to give them experience ahead of a possible promotion to a main game full-time or co-driver role in 2010.

Sonic Motor Racing Services ultimately withdrew their entry and V8 Supercars Australia decided not to allow them to be replaced with another team.

== Race calendar ==
The following events made up the 2009 series.

The Desert 400 originally scheduled to take place on 5–7 November was moved into the 2010 season. A replacement event, The Island 300, was announced in late September at Phillip Island. The Nikon SuperGP altered its format at late notice after the cancellation of the A1 Grand Prix event which was due to be held at the same event. The two by 200 kilometre races were altered to two races each split into two 150 kilometre legs. Race winners were declared on the basis of accumulated points over the two legs held each day.

Round	Event	Circuit/Location	Date	Race winning driver	Racing winning team	Report
1	(South Australia) Clipsal 500	Adelaide Street Circuit, Adelaide	19–22 March	Jamie Whincup	Triple Eight Race Engineering	report
1	(South Australia) Clipsal 500	Adelaide Street Circuit, Adelaide	19–22 March	Jamie Whincup	Triple Eight Race Engineering	report
2	(New Zealand) Hamilton 400	Hamilton Street Circuit, Hamilton	17–19 April	Jamie Whincup	Triple Eight Race Engineering	report
2	(New Zealand) Hamilton 400	Hamilton Street Circuit, Hamilton	17–19 April	Jamie Whincup	Triple Eight Race Engineering	report
3	(Victoria (state)) Winton Motor Raceway	Winton Motor Raceway, Benalla	1–3 May	Craig Lowndes	Triple Eight Race Engineering	report
3	(Victoria (state)) Winton Motor Raceway	Winton Motor Raceway, Benalla	1–3 May	Craig Lowndes	Triple Eight Race Engineering	report
4	Falken Tasmania Challenge	Symmons Plains Raceway, Launceston	29–31 May	Garth Tander	Holden Racing Team	report
4	Falken Tasmania Challenge	Symmons Plains Raceway, Launceston	29–31 May	Jamie Whincup	Triple Eight Race Engineering	report
5	(Northern Territory) Skycity Triple Crown	Hidden Valley Raceway, Darwin	19–21 June	Jamie Whincup	Triple Eight Race Engineering	report
5	(Northern Territory) Skycity Triple Crown	Hidden Valley Raceway, Darwin	19–21 June	Michael Caruso	Garry Rogers Motorsport	report
6	(Queensland) Dunlop Townsville 400	Reid Park Street Circuit, Townsville	10–12 July	Jamie Whincup	Triple Eight Race Engineering	report
6	(Queensland) Dunlop Townsville 400	Reid Park Street Circuit, Townsville	10–12 July	James Courtney	Dick Johnson Racing	report
7	(Victoria (state)) Norton 360 Sandown Challenge	Sandown Raceway, Springvale	31 July – 2 August	Will Davison	Holden Racing Team	report
7	(Victoria (state)) Norton 360 Sandown Challenge	Sandown Raceway, Springvale	31 July – 2 August	Garth Tander	Holden Racing Team	report
8	Queensland House and Land.com 300	Queensland Raceway, Willowbank	21–23 August	Jamie Whincup	Triple Eight Race Engineering	report
8	Queensland House and Land.com 300	Queensland Raceway, Willowbank	21–23 August	Will Davison	Holden Racing Team	report
9	(Victoria (state)) L&H 500	Phillip Island Grand Prix Circuit, Phillip Island	11–13 September	Will Davison; Garth Tander	Holden Racing Team	report
10	(New South Wales) Supercheap Auto Bathurst 1000	Mount Panorama Circuit, Bathurst	8–11 October	Will Davison; Garth Tander	Holden Racing Team	report
11	(Queensland) Gold Coast Nikon SuperGP	Surfers Paradise Street Circuit, Surfers Paradise	22–25 October	L1: Mark Winterbottom; L2: Garth Tander	L1: Ford Performance Racing; L2: Holden Racing Team	report
11	(Queensland) Gold Coast Nikon SuperGP	Surfers Paradise Street Circuit, Surfers Paradise	22–25 October	L1: Craig Lowndes; L2: Mark Winterbottom	L1: Triple Eight Race Engineering; L2: Ford Performance Racing	report
12	(Victoria (state)) The Island 300	Phillip Island Grand Prix Circuit, Phillip Island	7–8 November	Jamie Whincup	Triple Eight Race Engineering	report
12	(Victoria (state)) The Island 300	Phillip Island Grand Prix Circuit, Phillip Island	7–8 November	Jamie Whincup	Triple Eight Race Engineering	report
13	(Western Australia) BigPond 300	Barbagallo Raceway, Perth	20–22 November	Jamie Whincup	Triple Eight Race Engineering	report
13	(Western Australia) BigPond 300	Barbagallo Raceway, Perth	20–22 November	Craig Lowndes	Triple Eight Race Engineering	report
14	(New South Wales) Sydney Telstra 500	Homebush Street Circuit, Sydney Olympic Park	4–6 December	Garth Tander	Holden Racing Team	report
14	(New South Wales) Sydney Telstra 500	Homebush Street Circuit, Sydney Olympic Park	4–6 December	James Courtney	Dick Johnson Racing	report
Maps of circuit locations
2009 V8 Supercar Championship Series is located in Australia 2009 V8 Supercar Championship Series is located in New Zealand

== Points system ==
Points are awarded to any driver that completes 75% of race distance and is running on the completion of the final lap.

Pos	1st	2nd	3rd	4th	5th	6th	7th	8th	9th	10th	11th	12th	13th	14th	15th	16th	17th	18th	19th	20th	21st	22nd	23rd	24th	25th	26th	27th	28th	29th	30th
Std	150	138	129	120	111	102	96	90	84	78	72	69	66	63	60	57	54	51	48	45	42	39	36	33	30	27	24	21	18	15
L&H 500 Qual	50	46	43	40	37	34	32	30	28	26	24	23	22	21	20	19	18	17	16	15	14	13	12	11	10	9	8	7	6	5
L&H 500 Feature	200	184	172	160	148	136	128	120	112	104	96	92	88	84	80	76	72	68	64	60	56	52	48	44	40	36	32	28	24	20
Bathurst	300	276	258	240	222	204	192	180	168	156	144	138	132	126	120	114	108	102	96	90	84	78	72	66	60	54	48	42	36	30
SP 4 races	75	69	65	60	56	51	48	45	42	39	36	35	33	32	30	29	27	26	24	23	21	20	18	17	15	14	12	11	9	

NOTES:

Std denotes all races except the L&H 500, Bathurst 1000, and Surfers Paradise. These three races have unique rules.

L&H 500: Phillip Island races are split into qualifying races and 500 km feature race. The two drivers per team will be grouped into separate qualifying races that will count towards drivers' individual point totals and towards the starting grid for the feature race. The two drivers will then race one car for the 500 km endurance race.

Bathurst: Both drivers will share one car for entire race.

Surfers Paradise: Four races.

== Championship standings ==
=== Drivers Championship ===
Pos.	Driver	No.	ADE (South Australia)		HAM (New Zealand)		WIN (Victoria (state))		SYM (Tasmania)		HID (Northern Territory)		TOW (Queensland)		SAN (Victoria (state))		QLD (Queensland)		PHI1 (Victoria (state))	BAT (New South Wales)	SUR (Queensland)				PHI2 (Victoria (state))		BAR (Western Australia)		SYD (New South Wales)		Pen.	Pts.
1	(Australia) Jamie Whincup	1	**1**	**1**	1	1	2	**13**	8	**1**	1	10	1	2	6	3	**1**	13	2	5	13	8	Ret	6	1	**1**	1	**4**	5	14	0	3349
2	(Australia) Will Davison	22	3	2	4	7	7	5	4	2	3	18	2	4	**1**	**2**	Ret	1	1	1	3	3	21	10	2	11	5	Ret	15	8	0	3044
3	(Australia) Garth Tander	2	Ret	3	11	9	8	3	**1**	12	4	**5**	3	**3**	17	1	Ret	14	1	**1**	2	1	3	2	4	3	11	3	**1**	Ret	0	2916
4	(Australia) Craig Lowndes	888	19	4	24	Ret	1	1	7	10	6	3	4	9	3	5	Ret	2	2	5	4	4	1	**13**	28	7	**6**	1	19	Ret	10	2592
5	(Australia) Mark Winterbottom	5	18	22	**2**	Ret	**25**	2	16	4	2	17	8	6	12	16	3	**4**	**3**	Ret	**1**	**2**	2	1	6	Ret	3	17	2	3	0	2414
6	(Australia) Steven Johnson	17	4	6	5	**3**	12	21	3	18	17	13	13	5	8	17	4	15	4	24	10	11	6	5	8	24	10	2	Ret	10	0	2255
7	(Australia) James Courtney	18	20	24	13	2	Ret	6	30	Ret	8	12	Ret	1	2	8	2	8	4	24	Ret	16	5	3	9	4	4	10	17	1	10	2192
8	(Australia) Rick Kelly	15	10	10	7	14	4	7	11	27	15	4	7	Ret	24	13	14	10	5	8	12	9	20	9	3	2	7	16	9	Ret	10	2162
9	(Australia) Russell Ingall	39	8	15	23	Ret	9	11	2	6	13	8	6	Ret	7	14	12	3	7	15	9	Ret	4	Ret	13	27	9	5	16	4	10	2048
10	(Australia) Lee Holdsworth	33	2	5	3	4	23	Ret	10	5	10	7	**Ret**	7	18	11	7	16	Ret	3	Ret	14	22	12	7	13	12	Ret	4	**Ret**	0	2006
11	(Australia) Michael Caruso	34	Ret	16	25	6	10	27	12	16	11	1	5	10	5	20	19	6	Ret	3	Ret	12	Ret	14	20	10	14	18	6	2	0	1977
12	(New Zealand) Shane van Gisbergen	9	6	13	17	15	6	12	6	20	20	9	12	Ret	15	Ret	9	12	10	13	5	7	19	11	5	6	15	13	10	6	15	1970
13	(New Zealand) Steven Richards	6	Ret	9	15	12	3	16	15	15	21	14	21	20	14	12	11	7	**3**	Ret	7	6	12	Ret	17	14	23	8	8	15	0	1780
14	(New Zealand) Jason Richards	8	5	7	10	22	13	26	18	23	**7**	11	23	12	19	6	21	17	Ret	2	Ret	24	10	8	10	15	20	14	12	Ret	4	1756
15	(New Zealand) Fabian Coulthard	111	11	12	6	5	15	Ret	14	3	12	20	15	19	10	15	5	23	Ret	Ret	Ret	13	Ret	DNS	14	9	13	11	13	5	0	1665
16	(Australia) Alex Davison	4	15	25	9	10	21	15	17	11	19	2	Ret	Ret	16	21	13	19	10	13	16	17	16	17	11	12	17	21	20	9	0	1648
17	(Australia) Paul Dumbrell	10/22	17	17	18	23	16	4	23	17	14	6	11	8	23	10	22	5	8	21	8	22	11	20	12	8	16	12	Ret	13	150	1627
18	(Australia) Todd Kelly	7	7	Ret	8	24	Ret	24	5	Ret	5	28	10	Ret	4	18	6	18	5	8	19	23	18	15	29	21	2	Ret	14	Ret	15	1624
19	(Australia) Jason Bright	25	12	11	21	18	14	Ret	26	7	16	19	16	18	Ret	19	8	9	25	11	Ret	20	8	4	**16**	5	24	6	3	Ret	0	1607
20	(Australia) Cameron McConville	14	9	21	16	19	5	23	13	13	9	23	9	11	22	4	Ret	11	Ret	2	18	19	Ret	DNS	24	25	25	9	Ret	Ret	0	1565
21	(New Zealand) Greg Murphy	51	Ret	8	Ret	8	22	20	9	22	23	21	19	Ret	11	23	17	Ret	11	4	6	5	14	7	15	26	8	19	Ret	7	0	1555
22	(Australia) David Reynolds	24	13	Ret	12	11	20	8	20	26	18	27	22	14	9	Ret	20	20	16	12	15	18	7	Ret	18	18	28	15	18	11	0	1428
23	(Australia) Tim Slade	67	Ret	Ret	Ret	DNS	18	17	24	14	27	25	Ret	13	21	24	10	22	7	7	17	21	17	21	21	16	19	22	Ret	16	0	1221
24	(Australia) Tony D'Alberto	55	Ret	23	20	21	11	14	25	19	26	Ret	Ret	17	DNS	7	16	Ret	15	10	20	25	13	16	19	17	22	23	11	Ret	0	1196
25	(Australia) Jason Bargwanna	3	Ret	20	Ret	Ret	26	10	19	8	22	Ret	14	Ret	20	9	18	25	Ret	6	11	10	**9**	Ret	23	19	18	7	7	Ret	100	1192
26	(Australia) Jack Perkins	11	Ret	Ret	19	17	19	19	21	21	Ret	24	18	22	13	Ret	23	26	14	14	14	15	Ret	18	25	23	26	24	Ret	Ret	0	993
27	(Australia) Michael Patrizi	333	Ret	19	14	13	Ret	22	27	9	24	15	20	15	Ret	22	15	24	Ret	Ret	22	26	Ret	DNS	27	20	21	Ret	Ret	12	5	920
28	(Australia) Dean Fiore	021/12	16	18	Ret	20	Ret	25	29	25	29	26	17	16	25	Ret	24	21	DNS	Ret	Ret	28	15	19	22	Ret	Ret	20	Ret	Ret	0	668
29	(Australia) Dale Wood	16/11	14	Ret	22	16	24	18	28	Ret	25	22							19	14											0	578
30	(Australia) Mark McNally	16											24	21	26	Ret	25	27	22	17	21	27	Ret	22	26	22	27	25	Ret	Ret	0	512
31	(Australia) Mark Skaife	51																	11	4											0	372
32	(Australia) Marcus Marshall	77	Ret	14	Ret	Ret	17	9	22	24	28	16	WD	WD																	0	351
33	(Australia) David Besnard	34																	13	9											0	306
33	(Australia) Greg Ritter	34																	13	9											0	306
35	(Australia) Andrew Thompson	55																	15	10											0	277
36	(United Kingdom) Andy Priaulx	24																	16	12											0	253
37	(New Zealand) Craig Baird	22																	8	21											0	249
38	(Australia) Mark Noske	3																	Ret	6											0	248
39	(Australia) Steve Owen	10																	12	16											0	247
39	(Australia) Shane Price	10																	12	16											0	247
41	(New Zealand) Daniel Gaunt	4																	17	19											0	213
41	(New Zealand) John McIntyre	4																	17	19											0	213
43	(Australia) Paul Morris	67																	Ret	7											0	206
44	(Australia) Karl Reindler	25																	25	11											0	192
44	(Australia) Leanne Tander	333																	19	18											0	192
44	(Australia) David Wall	333																	19	18											0	192
47	(Australia) Tony Ricciardello	16																	22	17											0	183
48	(Australia) Warren Luff	18																	6	Ret											0	182
48	(Australia) Jonathon Webb	18																	6	Ret											0	182
50	(United Kingdom) Ben Collins	15																	18	20											0	180
50	(Australia) Nathan Pretty	15																	18	20											0	180
52	(Australia) Dean Canto	5																	9	Ret											0	152
52	(Australia) Luke Youlden	5																	9	Ret											0	152
54	(Australia) Damian Assaillit	21																	23	22											0	147
54	(Australia) Brad Lowe	21																	23	22											0	147
56	(Australia) Owen Kelly	67																	Ret	15											0	134
57	(Australia) Andrew Jones	14																	Ret	23											0	104
57	(Australia) Brad Jones	14																	Ret	23											0	104
59	(Denmark) Allan Simonsen	88																	21	Ret											0	91
59	(United Kingdom) James Thompson	88																	21	Ret											0	91
61	(Australia) Andrew Fisher	13																	20	Ret											0	86
61	(Australia) David Sieders	13																	20	Ret											0	86
63	(Australia) Taz Douglas	23																	24	Ret											0	70
63	(Australia) Sam Walter	23																	24	Ret											0	70
65	(Australia) Troy Bayliss	12																	DNS	Ret											0	27
Pos.	Driver	No.	ADE (South Australia)		HAM (New Zealand)		WIN (Victoria (state))		SYM (Tasmania)		HID (Northern Territory)		TOW (Queensland)		SAN (Victoria (state))		QLD (Queensland)		PHI1 (Victoria (state))	BAT (New South Wales)	SUR (Queensland)				PHI2 (Victoria (state))		BAR (Western Australia)		SYD (New South Wales)		Pen.	Pts.

=== Teams Championship ===
Pos.	Team	No.	ADE (South Australia)		HAM (New Zealand)		WIN (Victoria (state))		SYM (Tasmania)		HID (Northern Territory)		TOW (Queensland)		SAN (Victoria (state))		QLD (Queensland)		PHI1 (Victoria (state))	BAT (New South Wales)	SUR (Queensland)				PHI2 (Victoria (state))		BAR (Western Australia)		SYD (New South Wales)		Pen.	Pts.
1	Holden Racing Team	2	Ret	3	11	9	8	3	**1**	12	4	**5**	3	**3**	17	1	Ret	14	1	**1**	2	1	3	2	4	3	11	3	**1**	Ret	0	5650
1	Holden Racing Team	22	3	2	4	7	7	5	4	2	3	18	2	4	**1**	**2**	Ret	1	8	21	3	3	21	10	2	11	5	Ret	15	8	0	5650
2	Triple Eight Race Engineering	1	**1**	**1**	1	1	2	**13**	8	**1**	1	10	1	2	6	3	**1**	13			13	8	Ret	6	1	**1**	1	**4**	5	14	0	5573
2	Triple Eight Race Engineering	88																	21	Ret											0	5573
2	Triple Eight Race Engineering	888	19	4	24	Ret	1	1	7	10	6	3	4	9	3	5	Ret	2	2	5	4	4	1	**13**	28	7	**6**	1	19	Ret	0	5573
3	Dick Johnson Racing	17	4	6	5	**3**	12	21	3	18	17	13	13	5	8	17	4	15	4	24	10	11	6	5	8	24	10	2	Ret	10	0	4357
3	Dick Johnson Racing	18	20	24	13	2	Ret	6	30	Ret	8	12	Ret	1	2	8	2	8	6	Ret	Ret	16	5	3	9	4	4	10	17	1	0	4357
4	Ford Performance Racing	5	18	22	**2**	Ret	**25**	2	16	4	2	17	8	6	12	16	3	**4**	9	Ret	**1**	**2**	2	1	6	Ret	3	17	2	3	0	4104
4	Ford Performance Racing	6	Ret	9	15	12	3	16	15	15	21	14	21	20	14	12	11	7	**3**	Ret	7	6	12	Ret	17	14	23	8	8	15	0	4104
5	Garry Rogers Motorsport	33	2	5	3	4	23	Ret	10	5	10	7	**Ret**	7	18	11	7	16	Ret	9	Ret	14	22	12	7	13	12	Ret	4	**Ret**	0	3990
5	Garry Rogers Motorsport	34	Ret	16	25	6	10	27	12	16	11	1	5	10	5	20	19	6	13	3	Ret	12	Ret	14	20	10	14	18	6	2	0	3990
6	Jack Daniels Racing	7	7	Ret	8	24	Ret	24	5	Ret	5	28	10	Ret	4	18	6	18	5	8	19	23	18	15	29	21	2	Ret	14	Ret	0	3608
6	Jack Daniels Racing	15	10	10	7	14	4	7	11	27	15	4	7	Ret	24	13	14	10	18	20	12	9	20	9	3	2	7	16	9	Ret	0	3608
7	Stone Brothers Racing	4	15	25	9	10	21	15	17	11	19	2	Ret	Ret	16	21	13	19	17	19	16	17	16	17	11	12	17	21	20	9	0	3555
7	Stone Brothers Racing	9	6	13	17	15	6	12	6	20	20	9	12	Ret	15	Ret	9	12	10	13	5	7	19	11	5	6	15	13	10	6	0	3555
8	Paul Morris Motorsport	39	8	15	23	Ret	9	11	2	6	13	8	6	Ret	7	14	12	3	7	15	9	Ret	4	Ret	13	27	9	5	16	4	0	3116
8	Paul Morris Motorsport	67	Ret	Ret	Ret	DNS	18	17	24	14	27	25	Ret	13	21	24	10	22	Ret	7	17	21	17	21	21	16	19	22	Ret	16	0	3116
9	Brad Jones Racing	8	5	7	10	22	13	26	18	23	**7**	11	23	12	19	6	21	17	Ret	2	Ret	24	10	8	10	15	20	14	12	Ret	0	3108
9	Brad Jones Racing	14	9	21	16	19	5	23	13	13	9	23	9	11	22	4	Ret	11	Ret	23	18	19	Ret	DNS	24	25	25	9	Ret	Ret	0	3108
10	Walkinshaw Racing	10	17	17	18	23	16	4	23	17	14	6	11	8	23	10	22	5	12	16	8	22	11	20	12	8	16	12	Ret	13	0	2986
10	Walkinshaw Racing	24	13	Ret	12	11	20	8	20	26	18	27	22	14	9	Ret	20	20	16	12	15	18	7	Ret	18	18	28	15	18	11	0	2986
11	Tasman Motorsport	3	Ret	20	Ret	Ret	26	10	19	8	22	Ret	14	Ret	20	9	18	25	Ret	6	11	10	**9**	Ret	23	19	18	7	7	Ret	0	2847
11	Tasman Motorsport	51	Ret	8	Ret	8	22	20	9	22	23	21	19	Ret	11	23	17	Ret	11	4	6	5	14	7	15	26	8	19	Ret	7	0	2847
12	Paul Cruickshank Racing	111	11	12	6	5	15	Ret	14	3	12	20	15	19	10	15	5	23	Ret	Ret	Ret	13	Ret	DNS	14	9	13	11	13	5	0	2725
12	Paul Cruickshank Racing	333	Ret	19	14	13	Ret	22	27	9	24	15	20	15	Ret	22	15	24	19	18	22	26	Ret	DNS	27	20	21	Ret	Ret	12	0	2725
13	Kelly Racing	11	Ret	Ret	19	17	19	19	21	21	Ret	24	18	22	13	Ret	23	26	14	14	14	15	Ret	18	25	23	26	24	Ret	Ret	0	1838
13	Kelly Racing	16	14	Ret	22	16	24	18	28	Ret	25	22	24	21	26	Ret	25	27	22	17	21	27	Ret	22	26	22	27	25	Ret	Ret	0	1838
14	Britek Motorsport (s)	25	12	11	21	18	14	Ret	26	7	16	19	16	18	Ret	19	8	9	Ret	11	Ret	20	8	4	**16**	5	24	6	3	Ret	0	1607
15	Tony D'Alberto Racing (s)	55	Ret	23	20	21	11	14	25	19	26	Ret	Ret	17	DNS	7	16	Ret	15	10	20	25	13	16	19	17	22	23	11	Ret	0	1196
16	Triple F Racing (s); Team Kiwi Racing (s)	021/12					Ret	25	29	25	29	26	17	16	25	Ret	24	21	DNS	Ret	Ret	28	15	19	22	Ret	Ret	20	Ret	Ret	0	668
16	Triple F Racing (s); Team Kiwi Racing (s)	021	16	18	Ret	20																									0	668
17	Marcus Marshall Motorsport (s)	77	Ret	14	Ret	Ret	17	9	22	24	28	16	WD	WD																	0	351
18	MW Motorsport (w)	21																	23	22											0	150
19	Sieders Racing Team (w)	13																	20	Ret											0	85
20	Greg Murphy Racing (w)	23																	24	Ret											0	69
Pos.	Team	No.	ADE (South Australia)		HAM (New Zealand)		WIN (Victoria (state))		SYM (Tasmania)		HID (Northern Territory)		TOW (Queensland)		SAN (Victoria (state))		QLD (Queensland)		PHI1 (Victoria (state))	BAT (New South Wales)	SUR (Queensland)				PHI2 (Victoria (state))		BAR (Western Australia)		SYD (New South Wales)		Pen.	Pts.

Colour	Result
Gold	Winner
Silver	Second place
Bronze	Third place
Green	Points classification
Blue	Non-points classification
Blue	Non-classified finish (NC)
Purple	Retired, not classified (Ret)
Red	Did not qualify (DNQ)
Red	Did not pre-qualify (DNPQ)
Black	Disqualified (DSQ)
White	Did not start (DNS)
White	Withdrew (WD)
White	Race cancelled (C)
Blank	Did not practice (DNP)
Blank	Did not arrive (DNA)
Blank	Excluded (EX)

Bold - Pole position
Italics - Fastest lap

- (s) denotes a single-car team.
- (w) denotes an endurance race wildcard team.

=== Manufacturers Championship ===
Ford was awarded the Manufacturers Championship for 2009.

== See also ==
- 2009 V8 Supercar season
