= Marcus Marshall Motorsport =

Australian motor racing team

- Team Principal: Daniel Tzvetkoff; Salvatore Sciacca
- Debut: 2009
- Final Season: 2009
- Round wins: 0
- Pole positions: 0
- 2009 position: 17th (351 pts)

Marcus Marshall Motorsport (commercially titled Team IntaRacing) was a motor racing team that had competed in the Australian V8 Supercars Championship.

== History ==
An experienced campaigner in international motorsport as well as in domestic V8 Supercar racing, Marcus Marshall established his own race team for the 2009 season. He placed IntaBill owners Daniel Tzvetkoff and Salvatore Sciacca in operational positions, and the team acquired a Ford Falcon BF from Triple Eight Race Engineering. Marshall failed to finish the first race of the season in Adelaide.

After the non-championship round at the Australian Grand Prix, the team lost their title sponsor IntaBill due to the 2008 financial crisis. Whitegoods company Fisher and Paykel took title sponsorship for the series' annual New Zealand round where Marshall had a spectacular crash with a tyre bundle in a chicane, before appearing sponsorless at Winton – and the Tasmanian claimed the track lap record in the second race.

The team appeared at the Symmons Plains round with sponsorship from Sherrin Rentals, and confirmed their sponsored driver from the Fujitsu V8 Supercar Series – David Russell – as the team's endurance race co-driver. Marshall finished a lap down in both races. The team remained in Sherrin colours at the Skycity Triple Crown, however a potential sale of the team to the company failed and the team looked in financial trouble as Tzvetkoff was charged with money laundering in the United States.

The team arrived in Townsville but did not take to the track as the team could not find sufficient funding for engines, which had been paid for by Sherrin. Marshall received an AU$150,000 fine for failing to turn a lap at the event and he formally split with Tzvetkoff and Sciacca afterwards, selling the teams' Racing Entitlements Contract back to V8 Supercars Australia.
