= Paul Cruickshank Racing =

Australian motor racing team

PCR
- Team Principal: Paul Cruickshank
- Debut: 2006
- Final Season: 2009
- Round wins: 0
- Pole positions: 0
- 2009 position: 12th (2725 pts)

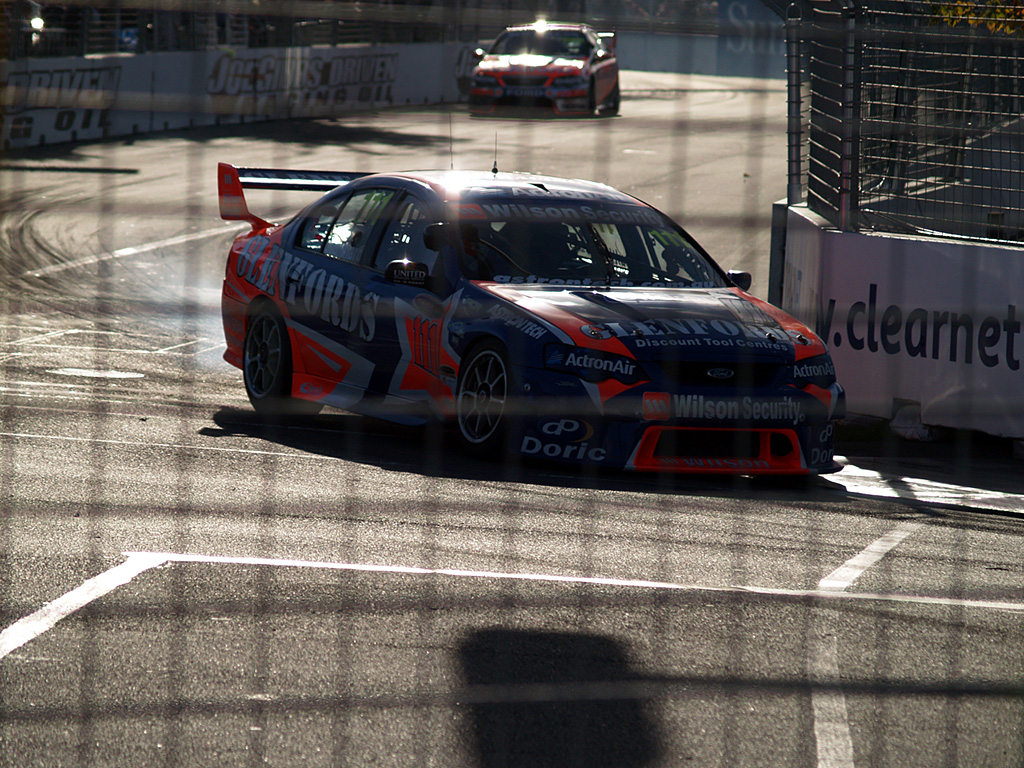
Fabian Coulthard at the 2008 Hamilton 400.

Paul Cruickshank Racing was an Australian motor racing team that competed in several Sports Car and Touring Car categories.

== History ==
While new to the championship in 2006, Cruickshank has run several cars in the Development V8 Supercar series and the Australian Carrera Cup Championship since starting his own team in the early part of the decade. Previously Cruickshank had been involved with teams in the Australian Nations Cup Championship before starting his own team in 2003. Former Champcar racer Marcus Marshall joined the team after being sacked from Walker Racing in late 2005.

In 2006 PCR was a new V8 Supercar team, it ran the #20 Glenfords Tools BA Falcon. At the Indy 300 the team changed it number to #111 for the round in memory of Mark Porter, at this round it was the team's best result.

1995 Australian Touring Car Champion, John Bowe joined the team for the 2007 season while sponsor Glenfords Tool Centers took title sponsorship for a second year. Cruickshank switched the team's racing number to #111 in memory of Cruickshank's friend, Mark Porter. The teams BA Falcon was updated to BF Specification for 2007.

Bowe retired from full-time racing after the 2007 season. For 2008, PCR retained Fabian Coulthard and acquired a new Ford BF Falcon from Triple 8 Race Engineering. Aaron Caratti drives the "Parklands on Bertram" Carrera cup car.

2-time New Zealand V8 Touring Car Champ John McIntyre paired with Fabian Coulthard in the Phillip Island 500 where he showed great pace but was not required for the Bathurst 1000. That seat was taken by Alex Davison whose performance at the mountain earned him a spot in the 2009 championship in the #4 Stone Brothers Racing Falcon.

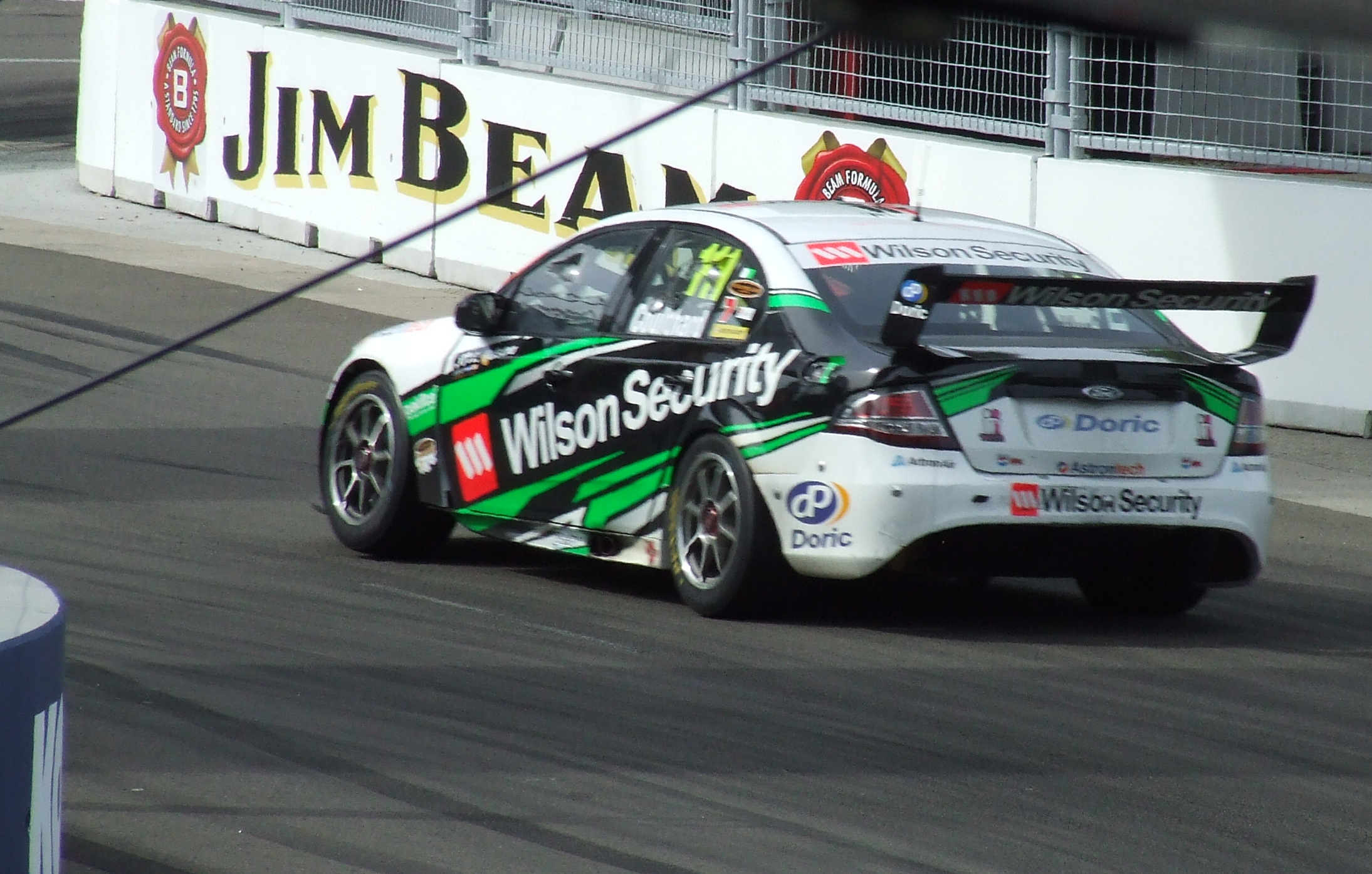
The Ford FG Falcon driven by Fabian Coulthard for Paul Cruickshank Racing at the 2009 Sydney Telstra 500

For 2009, the team expanded to two cars in the main V8 Supercars series, continuing with Fabian Coulthard in car #111, a brand-new Triple Eight Race Engineering FG Falcon, sponsored by Wilson Security, and adding Michael Patrizi in Coulthard's 2008 BF chassis racing under # 333, sponsored by Supply Direct. The licence for the second car was purchased from Jason Bright. PCR made no plans to compete in the Australian Carrera Cup series in 2009, which would later go on hiatus.

Leanne Tander joined the team for the L&H Phillip Island 500 and the Bathurst 1000 alongside David Wall who raced for Paul Cruikshank in the Carrera Cup Series in 2006 and 2007. At the end of the 2009 season Fabian Coulthard was released from his contract to join Walkinshaw Racing, the leased racing entitlement contract used to run Patrizi's car was returned to Britek Motorsport and the #111 REC was sold. Cruickshank wound up the team and took a management position within Stone Brothers Racing.

Paul currently runs Paul Cruikshank Automotive Centre in Moorabbin, Victoria.

=== Complete Bathurst 1000 results ===
Year	No.	Car	Drivers	Position	Laps
2006	20	Ford Falcon BA	(Australia) Marcus Marshall (Australia) Jonathon Webb	DNF	90
2007	111	Ford Falcon BF	(Australia) John Bowe (Australia) Jonathon Webb	14th	160
2008	111	Ford Falcon BF	(New Zealand) Fabian Coulthard (Australia) Alex Davison	10th	161
2009	111	Ford Falcon FG	(New Zealand) Fabian Coulthard (Australia) Michael Patrizi	DNF	120
2009	333	Ford Falcon BF	(Australia) David Wall (Australia) Leanne Tander	18th	160
