= Marcus Marshall =

Australian racing driver

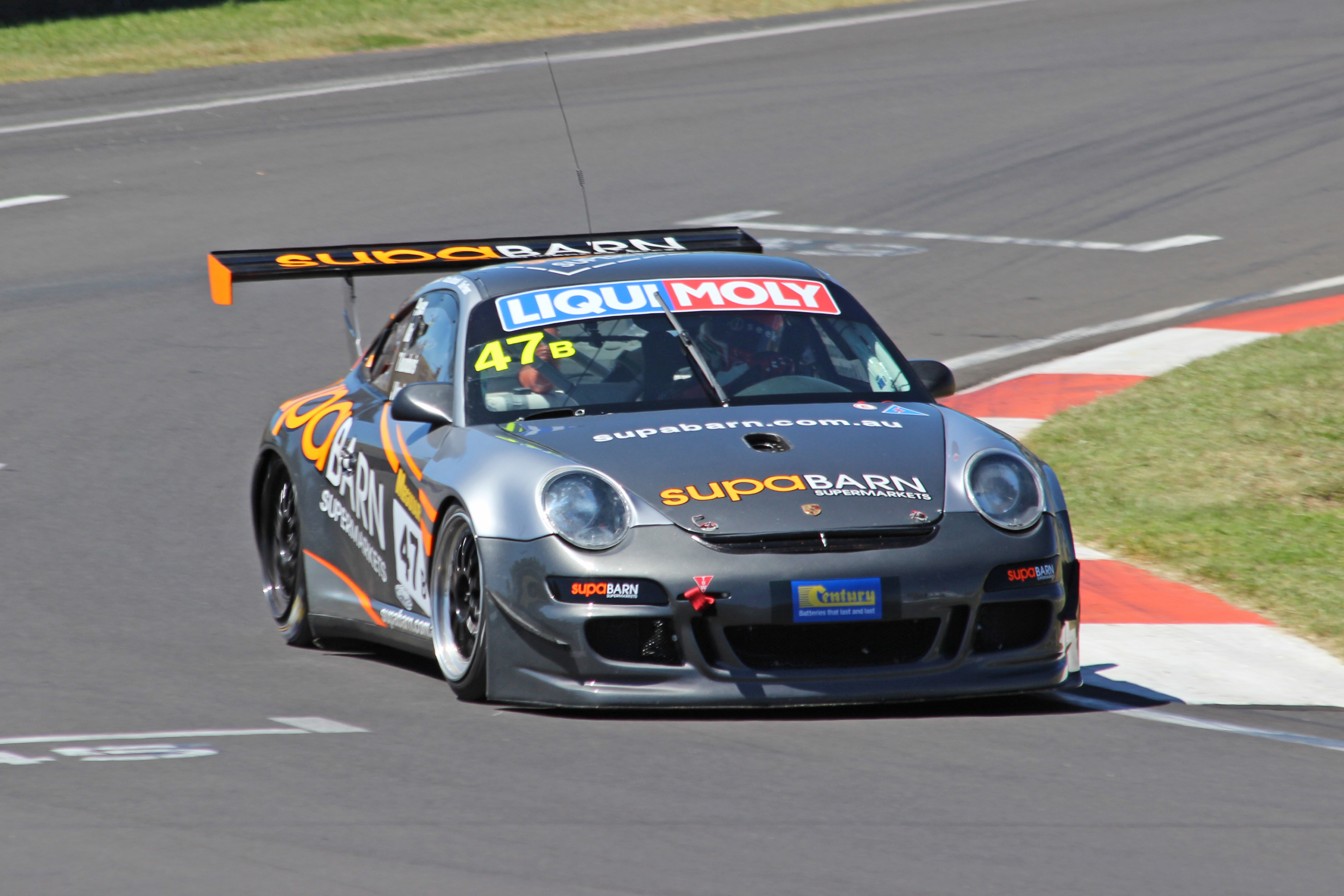
- Nationality: (Australia) Australian
- Born: Marcus John Marshall; 25 November 1978 (age 47) Burnie, Tasmania

V8 Supercar
- Years active: 2003–2011
- Teams: Paul Weel Racing; WPS Racing; Paul Cruickshank Racing; Perkins Engineering; Britek Motorsport; Team IntaRacing; Dick Johnson Racing; Garry Rogers Motorsport
- Starts: 45
- Best finish: 23rd in 2008 V8 Supercar Championship Series

Previous series
- 1997–98 1998 1999–2000 2000–02 2003, 2007 2003 2003,07,09,10 2004 2004 2005 2005/06: Queensland Club Cars; Australian GT Production; Formula Ford Queensland; Formula Ford Australia; Carrera Cup Australia; Porsche Supercup; Development V8 Supercar; Formula 3 Australia; Formula 3 Britain; Champ Car; A1 Grand Prix

Championship titles
- 1998 1999: Queensland Club Cars; Formula Ford Queensland

Marcus John Marshall (born 25 November 1978) is a former Champ Car driver from Australia.

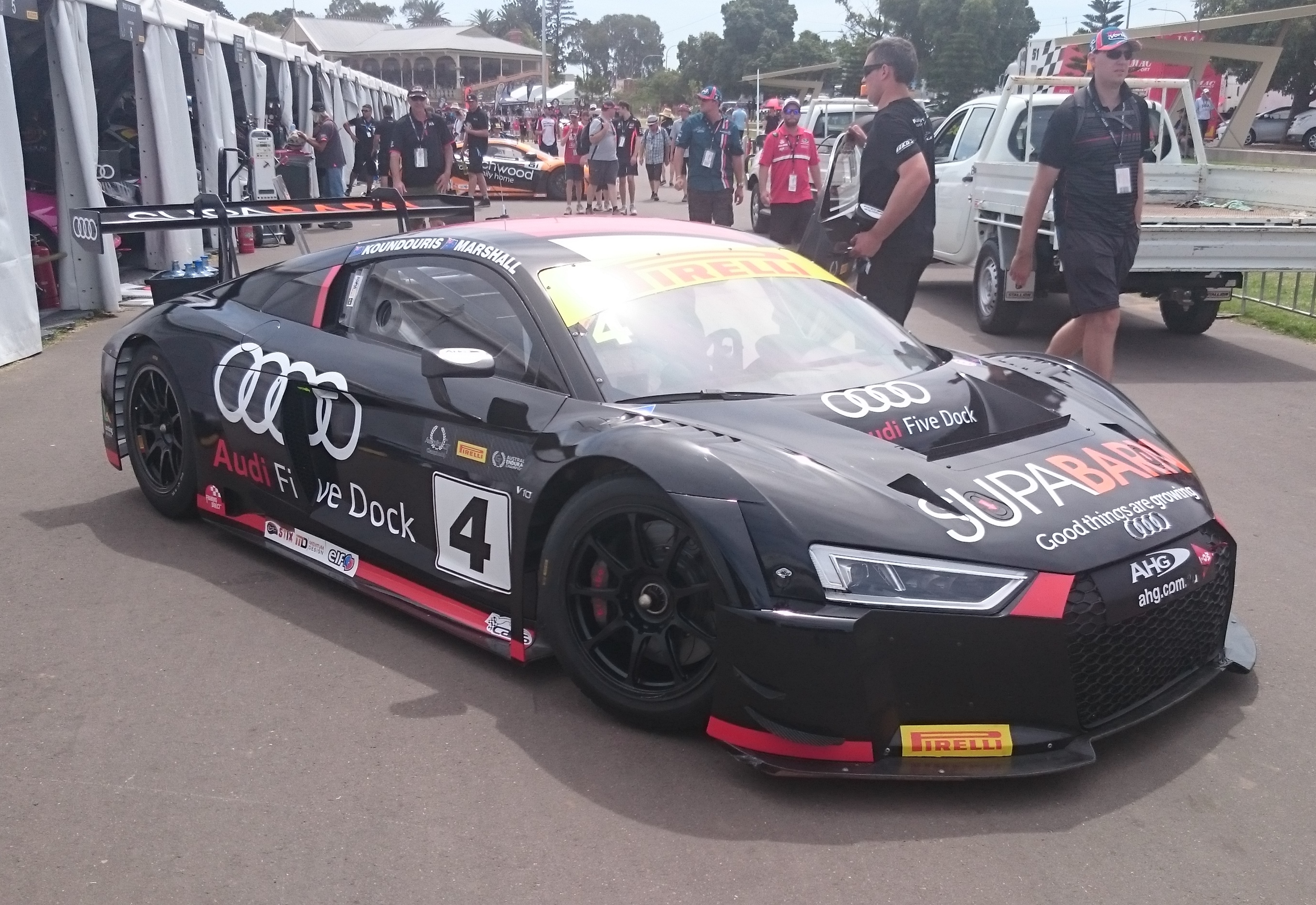
Marshall is contesting the 2016 Australian GT Championship with James Koundouris in an Audi R8 LMS

== Biography ==
Marshall began racing in British Formula Three, where he was generally a running outside the top ten, but took a hard-fought win in a wet race. He contested 12 races in 2005 for Derrick Walker's renamed Team Australia Racing. A lack of experience blighted his year and he scored only two top-ten finishes, the best of which was eighth in Edmonton. He was fired and replaced by Will Power prior to the season finale in Mexico City after what was described as a "serious breach of contract".

On 12 February 2006, Marshall raced for A1 Team Australia in round 8 of the A1 Grand Prix series at the Sentul International Circuit in Indonesia and finished third in the feature race, behind Canadian Sean McIntosh and Malaysian Alex Yoong. He practiced in Mexico, but did not race. During 2006, Marshall is racing full-time in the touring car V8 Supercar series for Paul Cruickshank Racing but lost his drive for 2007. He returned to Carrera Cup, taking over Peter Fitzgerald's car in the series after Fitzgerald retired at the end of the 2006 season. Marshall has also returned to V8Supercar, taking occasional drives with Matthew White Racing in the second tier series, before taking over Jack Perkins Commodore in the Perkins Engineering team after Perkins was forced to step aside with a medical condition. 2008 saw a move back to Ford and Britek Motorsport.

In the 2009 season, Marshall had a new team established around him, Marcus Marshall Motorsport (known by its sponsored identity, IntaRacing). After six races, financial issues forced the team to cease operations.

== Racing record ==
=== Career results ===
Season	Series	Position	Car	Team
1997	Australian Club Car Nationals	**3rd**	Mazda RX-4	Rotary Beat
1998	Queensland Club Car Championship	**1st**	Mazda RX-4	Rotary Beat
1999	Queensland Formula Ford Championship	**1st**	Spectrum 06b – Ford	Marcus Marshall
2000	Queensland Formula Ford Championship	6th	Spectrum 06b – Ford	Marcus Marshall
2000	Australian Formula Ford Championship	17th	Spectrum 07 – Ford	Borland Racing Developments
2000	Victorian Formula Ford Championship	16th	Spectrum 07 – Ford	Borland Racing Developments
2001	Australian Formula Ford Championship	7th	Van Diemen RF01 – Ford	No Limit Property Developments
2002	Australian Formula Ford Championship	**3rd**	Van Diemen RF01 – Ford	Garry Rogers Motorsport
2002	British Formula Renault Winter Series	10th	Tatuus - Renault 2.0	Marcus Marshall
2003	Australian Carrera Cup Championship	**2nd**	Porsche 996 GT3 Cup	V.I.P. Petfoods Racing
2003	Konica V8 Supercar Series	30th	Ford AU Falcon	Howard Racing
2003	V8 Supercar Championship Series	62nd	Holden VX Commodore	Paul Weel Racing
2004	Australian Formula Three	6th	Dallara F301 – Spiess Opel	Bronte Rundle Motorsport
2004	British Formula Three Championship	17th	Dallara F304 – Spiess Opel	Fortec Motorsport
2004	V8 Supercar Championship Series	55th	Holden VY Commodore	Paul Weel Racing
2005	Champ Car World Series	16th	Lola B02/00 Cosworth	Team Australia
2005/6	A1 Grand Prix	13th †	Lola A1GP Zytek	A1 Team Australia
2006	V8 Supercar Championship Series	29th	Ford BA Falcon	Paul Cruickshank Racing
2007	Australian Carrera Cup Championship	4th	Porsche 997 GT3 Cup	Fitzgerald Racing
2007	V8 Supercar Development Series	15th	Ford BA Falcon	Matthew White Motorsport
2007	V8 Supercar Championship Series	52nd	Holden VE Commodore	Perkins Engineering
2008	V8 Supercar Championship Series	23rd	Ford BF Falcon	Britek Motorsport
2009	Fujitsu V8 Supercar Series	22nd	Ford BF Falcon	Race Image Motorsport
2009	V8 Supercar Championship Series	32nd	Ford BF Falcon	Marcus Marshall Motorsport
2010	V8 Supercar Championship Series	44th	Ford FG Falcon	Dick Johnson Racing
2011	International V8 Supercars Championship	45th	Holden VE Commodore	Garry Rogers Motorsport
2015	Australian GT Championship	24th	Porsche 911 GT3-R; Porsche 911 GT3 Cup-S	Supabarn Supermarkets
2016	Australian GT Championship	5th	Audi R8 LMS	Supabarn Supermarkets

† Team result

=== Complete British Formula Three results ===
(key)

Year	Entrant	Chassis	Engine	1	2	3	4	5	6	7	8	9	10	11	12	13	14	15	16	17	18	19	20	21	22	23	24	25	DC	Points
2004	Fortec Motorsport	Dallara F304	Opel	DON; 1	DON; 2	SIL; 1	SIL; 2	CRO; 1; 16	CRO; 2; 13	KNO; 1; 13	KNO; 2 DNS	SNE; 1 DNS	SNE; 2; 11	SNE; 3; 12	CAS; 1; 11	CAS; 2; 14	DON; 1; 13	DON; 2; 11	OUL; 1; 9	OUL; 2; 12	SIL; 3 Ret	SIL; 4; 1	THR; 1 Ret	THR; 2; 14	SPA; 1	SPA; 2	BRH; 1	BRH; 2	17th	24

=== Complete Champ Car results ===
(key)

Yr	Team	No.	1	2	3	4	5	6	7	8	9	10	11	12	13	Rank	Points	Ref
2005	Team Australia	5	LBH; 14	MTY; 16	MIL; 13	POR; 14	CLE; 12	TOR; 14	EDM; 8	SJO; 12	DEN; 12	MTL; 16	LVG; 9	SRF; 11	MXC	**16th**	**104**	

=== Complete A1 Grand Prix results ===
(key) (Races in bold indicate pole position) (Races in italics indicate fastest lap)

Year	Entrant	1	2	3	4	5	6	7	8	9	10	11	12	13	14	15	16	17	18	19	20	21	22	DC	Points
2005–06	Australia	GBR; SPR	GBR; FEA	GER; SPR	GER; FEA	POR; SPR	POR; FEA	AUS; SPR	AUS; FEA	MYS; SPR	MYS; FEA	UAE; SPR	UAE; FEA	RSA; SPR	RSA; FEA	IDN; SPR; 16	IDN; FEA; 3	MEX; SPR; PO	MEX; FEA; PO	USA; SPR	USA; FEA	CHN; SPR	CHN; FEA	13th	51

=== Porsche Supercup results ===
(key) (Races in bold indicate pole position) (Races in italics indicate fastest lap)

Year	Team	1	2	3	4	5	6	7	8	9	10	11	12	DC	Points
2003	Infineon Team Farnbacher PZM	ITA1	ESP	AUT	MON	GER1	GBR	GER2	HUN	BEL	ITA2	USA1; 5	USA2; 6	NC	0

=== Complete Bathurst 1000 results ===
Year	Car#	Team	Car	Co-driver	Position	Laps
2003	16	Paul Weel Racing	Holden Commodore VX	(Australia) Greg Ritter	DNF	159
2004	16	Paul Weel Racing	Holden Commodore VY	(Australia) Matthew White	DNS	0
2005	8	WPS Racing	Ford Falcon BA	(Canada) Alex Tagliani	13th	155
2006	20	Paul Cruickshank Racing	Ford Falcon BA	(Australia) Jonathon Webb	DNF	90
2007	11	Perkins Engineering	Holden Commodore VE	(New Zealand) Kayne Scott	DNF	91
2008	26	Britek Motorsport	Ford Falcon BF	(New Zealand) Matthew Halliday	14th	160
2010	17	Dick Johnson Racing	Ford Falcon FG	(Australia) Steven Johnson	12th	161
2011	34	Garry Rogers Motorsport	Holden Commodore VE	(Australia) Michael Caruso	10th	161

=== Complete Bathurst 24 Hour results ===
Year	Team	Co-drivers	Car	Class	Laps	Overall position	Class position
2003	(Australia) VIP Petfoods Racing	(United Kingdom) Tony Quinn (Australia) Klark Quinn (Australia) Grant Denyer	Porsche 996 GT3 Cup	B	495	6th	**2nd**

=== Complete Bathurst 12 Hour results ===
Year	Team	Co-drivers	Car	Class	Laps	Overall position	Class position
2015	(Australia) Supabarn Supermarkets Racing	(Australia) James Koundouris (Australia) Theo Koundouris (Australia) Sam Power	Porsche 997 GT3 Cup S	B	261	16th	**1st**
2016	(Australia) Supabarn Supermarkets Racing	(Australia) James Koundouris (Australia) Theo Koundouris (Australia) Shae Davies	Audi R8 LMS	AA	251	DNF	DNF
2017	(Australia) Supabarn Supermarkets Racing	(Australia) James Koundouris (Australia) Theo Koundouris (Australia) Simon Evans	Audi R8 LMS	AAM	251	11th	4th
