= Dick Johnson Racing =

Australian motor racing team

- Manufacturer: Ford
- Owner: Ralph family Ryan Story; Dick Johnson
- Team Principal: Mark Fenning
- Team Manager: Tom Moore
- Race Drivers: 17. Brodie Kostecki; 38. Rylan Gray
- Race Engineers: 17. George Commins; 38. Ed Williams
- Chassis: Mustang GT
- Debut: 1980 CRC 300 (first race); 1981 (ATCC)
- Drivers' Championships: 10 (1981, 1982, 1984, 1988, 1989, 1995, 2010, 2018, 2019, 2020)
- Teams' Championships: 3 (2017, 2019, 2020)
- Round wins: 46
- Race wins: 148
- 2025 position: 140
- 6th (3160 pts)

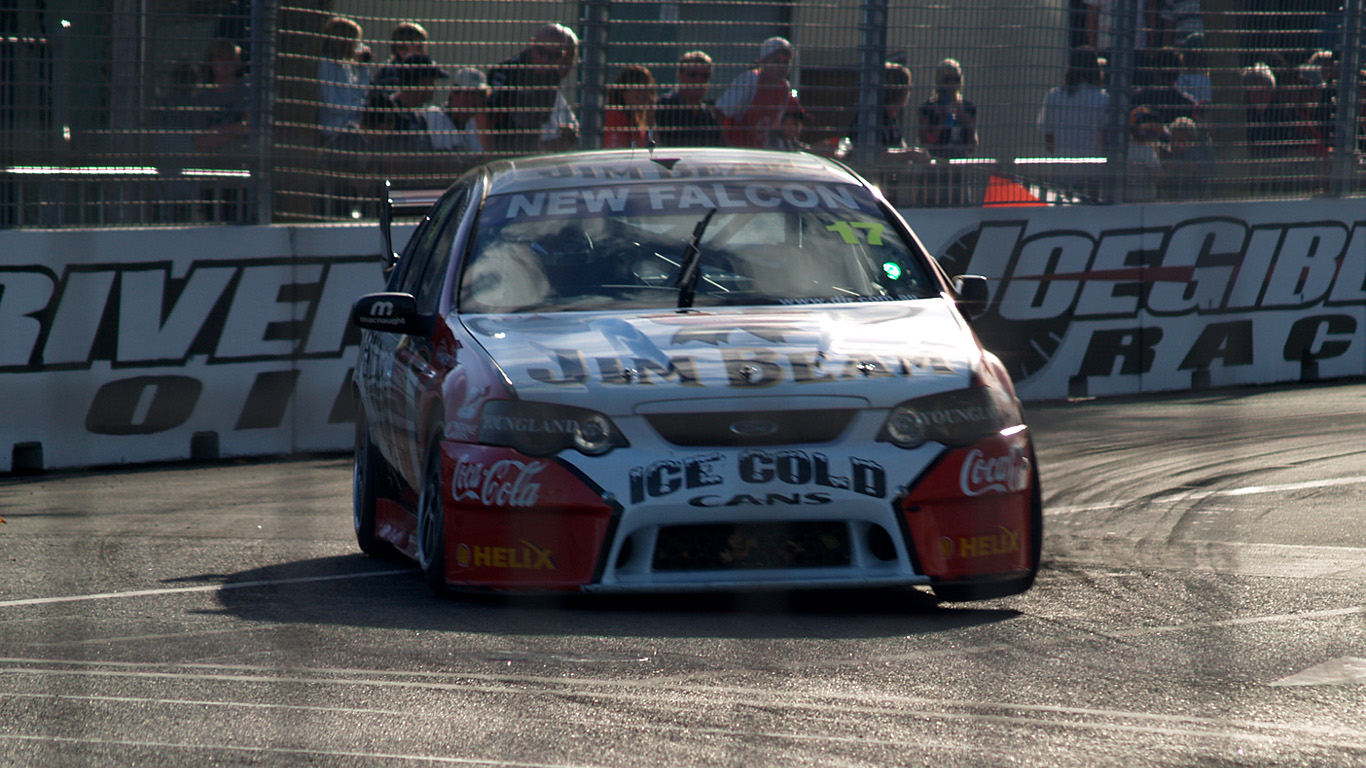
Steven Johnson at the 2008 Hamilton 400.

The team is currently branded as Shell V-Power Racing

Dick Johnson Racing (from 2015 - 2020 known as DJR Team Penske) is Australia's oldest motor racing team competing in the Supercars Championship. Founded by Dick Johnson, the team's drivers have won ten Australian Touring Car Championship titles (five of them by Johnson himself) and the team has taken five victories in Australia's premier race, the Bathurst 1000.

The team has raced as the Shell V-Power Racing Team since 2017, when Viva Energy Australia — the exclusive licensee for the supply of Shell fuels in Australia — became the team's Naming Rights Partner.

Located in Stapylton on the Gold Coast, the team currently runs two Ford Mustang GTs for Brodie Kostecki in the No. 17 car and Rylan Gray in the No. 38 car.

== History ==
After being only a sporadic entrant during the early 1970s, Johnson first reached prominence after his crash caused by a rock on track at Bathurst in 1980. Over $70,000 was donated by the public and Ford Australia to return him for the following season.

=== Early years and Group C ===
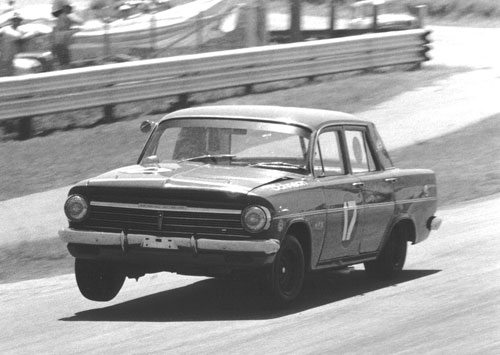
Dick Johnson driving a Holden EH at Lakeside in November 1969

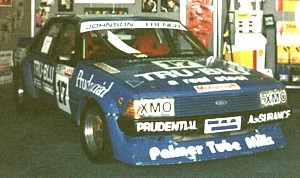
1981 Tru-Blu sponsored Ford XD Falcon

The longest-established motor racing team in Australia, Dick Johnson Racing was founded in 1980. The team was originally based out of Johnson's home in Daisy Hill in Brisbane's southern suburbs, before moving to facilities within sponsor Palmer Tube Mills' factory.

During the 1970s, Johnson was only a sporadic competitor in the Australian Touring Car Championship (ATCC), but a regular competitor, and victor in the Queensland Touring Car Championship driving a Holden LJ Torana GTR XU-1 backed by petroleum giant Shell, and later by prominent Brisbane Holden dealership, Zupps. Johnson's national profile increased with the formation of Bryan Byrt Racing with Johnson as lead driver late in 1976, giving Johnson his first drives in a Ford XB Falcon GT Hardtop. The team folded at the end of the 1979 season, but Johnson was able to use some of its resources to establish his own team for the following season with financial hold from Johnson's long time friend Ross Palmer and his Brisbane-based business Palmer Tube Mills.

After briefly investigating running a Mazda RX-7, Johnson came to the fore when a change in regulations introduced the Ford XD Falcon to the series. Johnson debuted his new Falcon at a non-championship meeting at Lakeside in June, and then finished second in the car in the 1980 CRC 300 at Amaroo Park in August. Johnson served notice of his and the XD's arrival to a delighted Peter Brock when he led the Holden Dealer Team VB Commodore early in the race and it was only tyre troubles that dropped him to second behind the Commodore. Brock was delighted as other than Kevin Bartlett's 5.7L Chevrolet Camaro Z28 (which had proved its speed, but its drum rear brakes were not up to the job), his HDT Commodore had proven near unbeatable in 1980 and Johnson and the new model Ford Falcon provided a welcome new challenger.

The largely unheralded Johnson then surprised everyone when he qualified on the front row for the 1980 Hardie-Ferodo 1000 alongside Bartlett's Camaro and in front of Brock (who had qualified on pole for all 12 races touring car races he had entered to that point of the year). Bartlett had been the fastest in official qualifying, but Dick matched his time by the 1/100 of a second. When the flag dropped to start the race, the Camaro bogged down and Johnson took off, quickly building a large lead over the first sixteen laps of the race, including putting a lap on four time and reigning Bathurst champion Brock after the Dealer Team Commodore had to pit for minor repairs. On the seventeenth lap after just having lapped Brock, Johnson collided with the wall coming out of The Cutting after running over a large rock in the road. Coming out of The Cutting (in the days before the use of the Safety car), Johnson found a tilt-tray tow truck that was retrieving a mechanically failed car from the circuit on one side of the road and a basketball sized rock sitting right on the only path past the truck. The Falcon ran over the rock with its left wheels and caused Johnson to impact the wall which was enough to all but destroy the car. In the aftermath of the crash, as Johnson was standing beside the car as it lay across the track (partially blocking it and leaving only one line through), he was almost cleaned up by the 3rd placed Falcon of Bob Morris who was forced to lock his brakes in a successful bid to avoid hitting Johnson after apparently not paying attention to the yellow flags.

The tale of Johnson's battle with the rock at Bathurst in 1980 is still remembered, and some AU$72,000 was donated by the Australian public who pledged money through the race broadcasters, the Seven Network after watching the crash and a subsequent TV interview with Johnson conducted by visiting American commentator Chris Economaki (with a visibly moved Johnson thanking both Seven and the Australian public). The amount pledged by Channel 7 viewers was matched by dollar for dollar by then Ford Australia boss Edsel Ford II who recognised the significance of Johnson's performance at Bathurst in keeping Ford at the sharp end of touring car racing. The overall donation of $144,000 plus the sale of the crashed Falcon to fellow Queenslander John Donnelly who repaired and returned it to racing, was enough to get Johnson back on track with a new XD Falcon for 1981.

Inspired by the support and feeling a great sense of debt to the Australian public, Johnson went on to win the 1981 Australian Touring Car Championship in a thrilling duel with Peter Brock which went down to the last race of the series at his home track of Lakeside in Brisbane. There Johnson led from the front and just managed to win by a second from Brock in what many believe to be one of the best touring car races seen in Australia with both drivers praising each other (and winning universal praise) for a clean race in which Brock had many chances to actually punt the Tru-Blu Falcon off the road but resisted the temptation to do so. After leading early in the Hang Ten 400 at Sandown Raceway in Melbourne, a couple of spins thanks to a new suspension set up that was not working handed Brock his seventh Sandown endurance race win in a row. The suspension problems were fixed by the time the team got to Bathurst for the James Hardie 1000 and Johnson again put the Falcon on the front row alongside Bartlett's Camaro. There, alongside veteran co-driver John French they becoming the first Queenslander's to win the event. With Allan Moffat becoming a factory Mazda driver, Johnson became Ford's lead driver and 'folk hero'. The 1981 race is remembered not only as DJR's first win at The Mountain, but also because the race was red flagged on lap 121 of 163 because of a crash at McPhillamy Park on lap 122 which blocked the track. As the Johnson/French car was leading at the end of lap 121 and the race had travelled more than two-thirds distance, the race was declared with Johnson and French the winners. It was the first time in the races history that the race had been declared short of the required distance.

Johnson won the touring car championship again in 1982 in the Tru Blu XD Falcon, though he had actually finished second in points behind Peter Brock. However, Brock was disqualified for the use of yet to be homologated engine parts and the subsequent loss of points gave Johnson his second ATCC championship win. At Bathurst, DJR had the new model Ford XE Falcon, but they had been overtaken in speed by the lighter Holden Commodore SS'. Despite running strong all day and having no major troubles other than a broken front sway bar late in the race which slowed the car by approximately one second per lap, the No. 17 Falcon finished in 4th place on the road (although three laps down on race winners Peter Brock and Larry Perkins in their Holden Dealer Team Commodore), but was disqualified after post race scrutineering for illegal engine modifications. In his biography, Johnson maintains that they were legal, over the counter Ford parts but that the team did not have the money to fight the ruling. The 1982 race was the first time that Johnson's car carried Channel 7's Racecam unit which brought television viewers footage from inside the car. It was the start of Johnson's long run with Racecam and made him more popular with the Australian public, even with Holden fans, thanks to his quick wit and seemingly endless number of one-liners while driving in races.

The 1983 Australian Touring Car Championship was a disappointment as the heavy, approximately 1,400 kg (3,100 lb), XE Falcon was not competitive against the around 200 kg (440 lb) lighter Commodores, the Nissan Bluebird Turbo, or Allan Moffat's Mazda RX-7 which won the title. To help fix the problems with the Falcon, Johnson enlisted the services of former Williams Formula One mechanic Wayne Eckersley, who was now based in Brisbane. Eckersley's work with the cars suspension, plus new parts (including 19-inch [480 mm] rear wheels, up from the previous 10-inch [250 mm]) in the August homologation saw the Falcon back as a competitive car, as displayed by Johnson when he easily led the Valvoline 250 at Sydney's Oran Park Raceway before a slow pit stop dropped his car, now painted Green to promote major sponsor Palmer Tube Mills' latest product "Greens-Tuf", back to second behind the Bluebird of George Fury. The Falcon was also on the pace at the 1983 Castrol 400 at Sandown where the long front and back straights suited the over 450 bhp (336 kW; 456 PS) of the 351 V8 engine. Dick qualified the car in 2nd place behind Brock's HDT Commodore (also benefiting from the August homologation) and won the jump at the start. However, his charge would only last only a few hundred metres and before the first turn the Falcon's clutch shredded itself, ending his race. Johnson attributed the failure to the condition of the pit paddock which had been turned to mud following a couple of days of heavy rain, with Dick claiming it was mud in the clutch that had caused the problem.

Then came the 1983 James Hardie 1000 where Johnson's Falcon was one of the favourites to claim pole position. Johnson also had a new co-driver in 1983 with 1974 race winner Kevin Bartlett replacing John French who was driving for the factory backed Nissan team. During qualifying it was again the Commodore of Peter Brock which had set the pace, with Johnson a close second and predicting that the Falcon could go even faster. During the Hardies Heroes Top 10 runoff on the Saturday morning, Johnson had his second major accident at Bathurst. On his lap for pole, Johnson ran slightly wide at Forrest's Elbow, with the rear of the Falcon clipping the wall on the exit of the corner. The car then hit tyres which were protruding from the edge of the wall which tore the right front wheel to the right and broke the cars steering. The Greens-Tuf Falcon was destroyed as it ran through a grove of trees. While the car was a write-off, Johnson thankfully emerged from the wreck with little more than a headache and a small cut over his left eye, though he has no memory of the crash, or the lift back to the pits with Peter Brock who was on his warm up lap for his second run.

In a very generous move, fellow Falcon runner and reporter for The Mike Walsh Show, Andrew Harris, approached Johnson's wife Jill in the pits shortly after the crash and offered his car to the Johnson team if a replacement car could not be found for him (Harris reasoned that the fans on the hill would have wanted to see the popular Johnson racing more than they would himself). Johnson's sponsor and friend Ross Palmer leased the Harris Falcon, while also buying the Barry Lawrence / Geoff Russell Holden Commodore for Harris to drive (Palmer would sell the car back to Barry Lawrence after the race).

The Harris Falcon, which was actually the then Alan Jones owned, Bob Morris XE Falcon that had crashed in practice at Bathurst in 1982 and could not be repaired in time to take the start, was converted by Dick's and the TAFE smash repair team overnight in a marathon rebuild which included help from other leading teams (including the HDT's sign writer), while the Commodore was re-painted in the colours of Harris' sponsors which also included a Bendigo Ford dealer. Unfortunately for Johnson and new co-driver Bartlett, the hastily rebuilt car (which was allowed to start tenth and was only completed moments before the start) was to only last 61 laps before being withdrawn with terminal electrical trouble (not before Johnson went on television and said that the car was "such a dog we should have tied it to the fence"). Better luck fell on Harris and co-driver Gary Cooke, who would finish tenth outright in the car dubbed as a "Falcodore" by its new team (although the car ran a 5.0L V8, the team cheekily placed the Falcon's 5.8L badge on the car), with Harris winning the "Wynns Rookie of the Year" award. Despite their troubles, the Johnson Falcon was the fastest recorded car on Conrod Straight during the race, hitting a reported 263 km/h (163 mph).

The troubles for DJR didn't finish at Bathurst though. On their way back to Brisbane after the race, the car towing the trailer with the crashed Falcon actually crashed and inflicted even further damage to the wrecked race car. The Falcon, dubbed "Greens Stuffed", was later broken up and used as paperweights.

Dick Johnson Racing then built a new XE Falcon to run in the 1984 Australian Touring Car Championship. Johnson's consistent run saw him finish no lower than third at each round while winning in the wet at Surfers Paradise. This saw Dick Johnson win his third ATCC and the final ATCC to be run under the locally developed Group C rules. During the ABC's coverage of the final round at the Adelaide International Raceway where Johnson finished a close third behind race winner Allan Grice (Commodore) and Peter Brock, commentator Will Hagon noted that following the championship trail in 1984 had seen the Johnson team cover more than 20,000 km. Although Johnson won the championship, and pointed to the cars reliability, he did acknowledge that other top contenders not running the full series (Allan Grice didn't have enough money, Peter Brock missed rounds while racing at Le Mans, Nissan missed rounds chasing development, and defending champion Allan Moffat suffered a bad crash at Surfers in which he was injured and missed the remainder of the series) did help his championship cause.

=== Group A ===
==== Mustangs ====
With no local Ford product suitable following a change to international Group A touring car regulations at the end of 1984, and as Ford Australia were not interested in homologating a mooted turbocharged XF Falcon sedan for Group A racing, Johnson ventured to Germany and purchased a pair of Zakspeed constructed Ford Mustangs for the 1985 and 1986 seasons. While the Mustang years brought limited success, reliability and good-handling in the underpowered cars enabled Johnson to claim runner-up in the 1985 Australian Touring Car Championship, while his one and only victory aboard the Mustang was in the Group A support race at the 1985 Australian Grand Prix in Adelaide. The Mustang, like almost all other cars in the ATCC, was outclassed by the JPS Team BMW 635 CSi of Jim Richards who won seven of the championships ten races. The team had actually entered and qualified one of the Mustangs at Bathurst in 1984 (painted white with #71) in the new Group A category, but it was only there for a shakedown run and insurance should there a repeat of 1983 and was withdrawn after Johnson had put the XE Falcon onto fourth on the grid.

When the team purchased the Mustangs from Zakspeed, the engine power was quoted as 310 bhp (231 kW; 314 PS). However, the car the team took to Bathurst in 1984 was described as 'sluggish' by both Dick Johnson and his co-driver John French with Johnson's best time being 5 seconds slower than the class leading V8 Rover Vitesse and some 14 seconds slower than his Group C Falcon. In the weeks following the race the team put the 5.0L Ford V8 engines on the dyno and found them to be only producing approximately 260 bhp (194 kW; 264 PS). Extensive rebuild and development of the engines at Johnson's Brisbane Engine Centre before the start of the 1985 ATCC saw power figures back to what was originally quoted.

While the Mustang struggled to match the pace of the Richards BMW in the ATCC, the August homologation (which also increased power to around 340 bhp (254 kW; 345 PS) brought the car back into winning contention. Dick dominated the Valvoline 250 at Oran Park and was heading for an easy win until an axle broke causing a wheel to fall off the car, ironically handing the win to Richards. The Mustang had received larger axles as part of the homologation package and the team had the new parts available, but had simply run out of time to fit them before the Oran Park race.

In mid-1985, Johnson signed triple and defending Bathurst 1000 winner Larry Perkins to be his co-driver for the Castrol 500 at Sandown and the James Hardie 1000 at Bathurst. Johnson led early at Sandown until a broken axle saw the team lose many laps in the pits repairing the car. At Bathurst, the team entered both Mustangs but only Johnson and Perkins as drivers. After the 1983 Hardies Heroes crash, the second No. 18 car (Johnson's ATCC car) was entered as an insurance policy in case something happened to the No. 17 Mustang. Ironically Johnson and Perkins qualified both cars for Hardies Heroes, though the No. 18 car was withdrawn before the race started. Against the might of Tom Walkinshaw Racing's three V12 Jaguar XJS', Johnson qualified fourth and ran strongly until the cars oil cooler broke a weld and had to be bypassed on lap 16, losing the team three laps. Johnson was unhappy as the oil cooler had actually split the day before when the car was going over the speed humps in the pit lane. Before he left the circuit that night he left instructions for his crew to replace the cooler, but returned on race morning to find it had only been repaired and not replaced (ironically the split occurred not at the repaired weld, but on the opposite side of the cooler). With no time left to change it the car was forced to start with the repaired cooler which subsequently failed. From then Johnson and Perkins drove as hard as they could with the engine temperature "off the clock" and were rewarded with a seventh-place finish, though Perkins' first lap of the race was a slow one as the left front wheel had not been secured properly with the wheel nut spinning off in the braking area at the top of Mountain Straight. Perkins then managed to get the car back to the pits without the wheel falling off the car.

Rumours had floated around the Bathurst pits that DJR had toyed with the idea of actually running both Mustangs in the race with the second car to be driven by Belgian jeweller Michel Delcourt and none other than former Ford hero Allan Moffat who was without a drive for the year thanks to Mazda pulling out and was actually commentating on the race for Channel 7. Moffat indeed drove the Mustang during practice, but this had only been part of his duties as an expert commentator to evaluate the leading (Australian) contenders. Delcourt was entered in the race in Graham Moore's Mitsubishi Starion Turbo, but the car was withdrawn following practice. Larry Perkins reportedly stopped DJR from fully entering the second car, rightfully (according to Johnson) reasoning that the team was not set up to race both cars.

With the arrival of the first truly competitive Group A Holden Commodore, the new VK SS Group A, and the new turbocharged Nissan Skyline DR30 RS, plus the continued development of the Volvo 240T, the Mustang quickly fell behind its rivals in 1986 and Johnson could only finish sixth in the ATCC with a best finish of 4th in the opening round at Amaroo Park. For Sandown and Bathurst the team signed former Grand Prix motorcycle star and Moffat team driver Gregg Hansford to be Johnson's co-driver. After failing to finish at Sandown, extra development work saw the Mustang competitive at Bathurst where Johnson qualified the car in sixth place, though the car was still out paced by the Nissans and Commodores. Before Hardies Heroes Johnson actually tripped while exiting the traditional breakfast and broke a bone in his foot, though he still drove in the runoff. Johnson and Hansford drove a steady race to finish in fourth place outright despite the 302 cui Ford V8 engine running low oil pressure throughout thanks to a crack in the engine block that was only discovered when the team stripped down the car and engine after Dick had raced it in the Group A support race at the 1986 Australian Grand Prix meeting in Adelaide. The Mustang also had a cracked windscreen from which had been there since before Hardies Heroes, and like 1985 before he left the circuit for the night Johnson instructed the team to change the windscreen. Upon returning to the circuit on race morning an angry Johnson found the cracked windscreen still on the car with no time to change it before the race, though thankfully the crack did not spread during the race.

Johnson's last drive in the Mustang came in the Group A support race for the 1986 Australian Grand Prix in Adelaide. After qualifying 8th, he failed to finish the 32 lap race.

==== Sierras ====
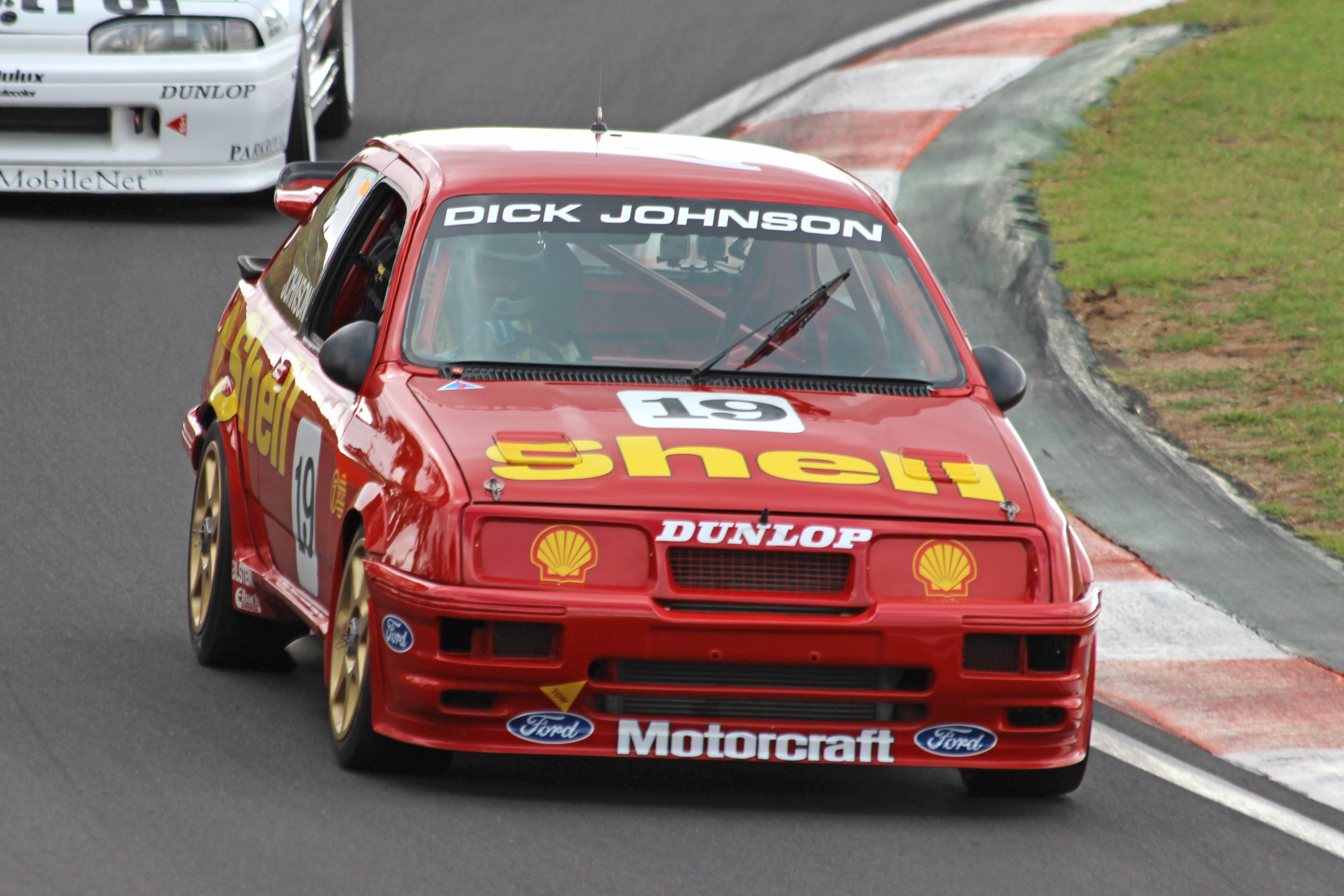
A Ford Sierra RS500 Cosworth that was campaigned by DJR throughout 1990, 1991 and 1992, pictured in 2015.

In 1987 the team switched to the Ford Sierra RS Cosworth and began a 17-year run of naming rights sponsorship with petrochemical company Shell. It expanded to a two-car effort for the first time with Gregg Hansford becoming Johnson's first full-time teammate. The new 340 bhp (254 kW; 345 PS), turbocharged Sierra's were plagued with reliability problems, usually blown turbos (according to Johnson in a 2015 interview with Australian Muscle Car magazine, DJR went through some 37 turbochargers in testing and race meetings in 1987), and this let the team down considerably, with only one win recorded in the 1987 Australian Touring Car Championship at the Adelaide International Raceway (Dick's first ATCC win since 1984), though significantly this was the first Group A win anywhere in the world for the RS Cosworth. Following the ATCC, the Ford Sierra RS500 was homologated which addressed most of the car's shortcomings. The RS500 was more powerful (470 bhp (350 kW; 477 PS) in 1987) with larger turbos and was also more reliable.

The team's poor run continued at the Sandown 500, where Johnson easily qualified his new Sierra RS500 on pole but the car blew its engine in the race morning warm up and was withdrawn, and Bathurst 1000 where both team cars were out of the 161 lap race before the end of lap 4 (Neville Crichton crashed the No. 18 Sierra he was to share with Charlie O'Brien on the 3rd lap with the Commodore of Larry Perkins which the Johnson / Hansford car suffered differential failure a lap later). Qualifying at Bathurst also proved controversial for the team with the two Sierra's excluded from the results of Hardies Heroes when they failed a post runoff fuel check. While the fuel was found to be a lower grade and actually produced less power, the rules had been broken. But the year ended well, with Johnson again winning the Group A support race in Adelaide at the Australian Grand Prix in November. Johnson, who was suffering fuel feed problems late in the race, just held on for his first win in the RS500 from the fast closing Nissan Skyline of George Fury.

In 1988 John Bowe replaced Hansford in the team and began an eleven-year stint as the driver of DJR's second car. With the team having overcome the reliability problems of the previous year and team manager Neal Lowe having come to grips with the engine management system earlier than his Australian counterparts (to the point where Lowe and the team were the first in Australia with the expertise to burn EPROM chips for the Sierra's), Johnson and Bowe finished an easy first and second in the 1988 and 1989 championships. Dick Johnson would later claim that he and his team were on a mission in 1988 after having been embarrassed at 1987 World Touring Car Championship round at Bathurst by the Ford Europe backed Eggenberger Motorsport Sierra's which not only proved faster but far more reliable (the Eggenberger cars would finish 1–2 on the road at Bathurst but would later be disqualified for technical infringements). He would also claim in the interview with Australian Muscle Car magazine in 2015 that another part of his motivation was that he had originally tried to buy an EPROM chip burning machine from British Sierra expert Andy Rouse in late 1987, but Rouse (protecting his own business interests) had refused to sell one, leaving Johnson feeling angry. It was then while in London that a chance meeting with one of the engineers involved with the Ford RS200 rally car project led to the purchase of the machine as well as Lowe travelling to the United States to learn how to use it.

After the differential failure which had put the No. 17 Johnson car out of the 1987 Bathurst 1000 on just lap 4, Johnson took it upon himself to solve the problem of the Sierra's weak drive train. In April 1988 after working with Melbourne-based Harrop Engineering (run by former racer / engineer Ron Harrop), DJR successfully homologated a modified version of the Ford 9-inch (230 mm) differential for the RS500 Sierra which also included upsized axles. Although the Sierra was a European car, the near bullet proof differential was seen as vital to Sierra runners in Australia due to the standing starts used in Australian racing rather than the rolling starts used overseas. Shortly after, Ford Europe also released their own official, lighter version of the 9-inch (230 mm) diff, but the DJR unit would prove to be popular due to its lower cost and ready made availability due to the sheer number of 9-inch (230 mm) diffs located in Australia. During 1988 Johnson also managed to homologate the Australian designed and built Holinger 6-speed gearbox for the Sierra which proved more reliable than the German built Getrag gearboxes that were common in most Group A cars at the time. And like the diff's, the Australian built Holinger would prove to be the gearbox of choice for Australian race teams.

In August 1988 the team air-freighted Johnson's ATCC winning car to England to compete in the RAC Tourist Trophy at Silverstone which was a round of the European Touring Car Championship. Johnson easily qualified on pole, almost half a second ahead clear of the leading Eggenberger Motorsport and Andy Rouse Sierras, and went on to an early race lead. The car was eventually slowed by a lengthy stop to replace a failed water pump and would ultimately finish the race in 21st place, but they had proven that the DJR Sierras were now the fastest in the world after also claiming the touring car lap record with the fastest lap of the race. The speed of the DJR Sierra created interest and at the end of 1988 Robb Gravett of British team Trakstar purchased two DJR Sierras to supply his team with his Sierra RS500s, winning four races to finish the 1989 season 2nd in class and 4th overall (Gravett, thanks to his Shell sponsorship in the British Touring Car Championship through its Gemini Oils brand, had driven for DJR at Bathurst in 1988 and 1989). In 1990, Robb Gravett won the championship with nine race wins.

After the two lead cars suffered mechanical troubles, Johnson and Bowe commandeered the John Smith / Alfredo Costanzo car (the oldest and slowest of the three entered being Johnson's 1987 Bathurst and Bowe's 1988 ATCC car) to finish second in the 1988 Bathurst 1000 behind the Sierra of fellow Queenslander Tony Longhurst and his co-driver Tomas Mezera, before winning in 1989 after leading every lap despite a late race loss of turbo power. Johnson claimed his first pole position at Bathurst in 1988, and again sat on the front row in 1989 alongside Peter Brock, who was now Sierra mounted. Brock won the start of the 1989 race, but in a show of power, Johnson blasted past the No. 05 Mobil 1 Racing Sierra on Conrod Straight into a lead that he and Bowe would not lose.

In 1990 Johnson narrowly lost the ATCC to the Gibson Motorsport Nissan Skyline R32 GT-R of Jim Richards (who also drove the previous model Skyline HR31 GTS-R until the car dubbed "Godzilla" arrived late in the series). The team's second car with Englishman Jeff Allam and Kiwi Paul Radisich finished second at the 1990 Bathurst 1000. Dick Johnson recorded two wins during the series in round 2 at Symmons Plains and again in round 3 at Phillip Island. The win at the Island (another 1–2 with Bowe finishing 2nd) would prove to be Dick Johnson's 30th and last ATCC race win.

The team also competed in the NASCAR Winston Cup Series in 1989 and 1990 with Johnson being an owner driver and up and coming driver Jay Sauter crew chiefed by future Championship winning crew chief with Jeff Gordon, Ray Evernham.

In the 1991 ATCC, the DJR team were outpaced by the Nissans of Richards and Mark Skaife with Bowe finishing sixth and Johnson ninth, with the Tooheys 1000 at Bathurst proving no different. 1991 had also seen a degree of unreliability creep into the Shell Sierra's not seen before, generally attributed to chasing more power in pursuit of the Nissan GT-R. In 1992, a team restructure saw Ross Stone appointed team manager with Lowe concentrating on building the first 1993-spec Ford EB Falcon V8. Bowe finished fourth and Johnson eighth in the ATCC. The Shell Sierras showed more speed in 1992 which both Johnson and Bowe attributed to the CAMS imposed 7,500 rev limit on the Sierra's (this was also applied to the V8 Holden Commodore's). The new rev limit forced Ross Stone to chase more torque rather than horsepower and this actually improved both the speed and reliability of the 4 cylinder Ford engine, and against the GT-Rs which had turbo and weight restrictions placed on them by CAMS, Bowe won the round at Sandown, before Johnson claimed pole at Bathurst with the fastest ever time recorded by a Sierra on The Mountain of 2:12.898, undercutting the previous Sierra best time set in 1990 by German driver Klaus Niedzwiedz by over a second. In the wet, crash shortened race, Johnson and Bowe finished second behind the GT-R of Richards and Skaife despite the Nissan crashing before the red flag was shown.

The final races for the DJR Shell Sierras came in the Group A support races for the 1992 Australian Grand Prix in Adelaide in November where John Bowe finished both races in second place behind Jim Richards. Johnson debuted the team's new EB FalconV8, the first Falcon built by the team since 1984. Despite trouble over the interpretation of the new 5.0L V8 rules which saw Johnson start from the rear of the grid, he finished the first race in a strong eleventh place before improving to ninth in the second.

=== Ford Falcon and V8 Supercars ===
==== 1990s ====
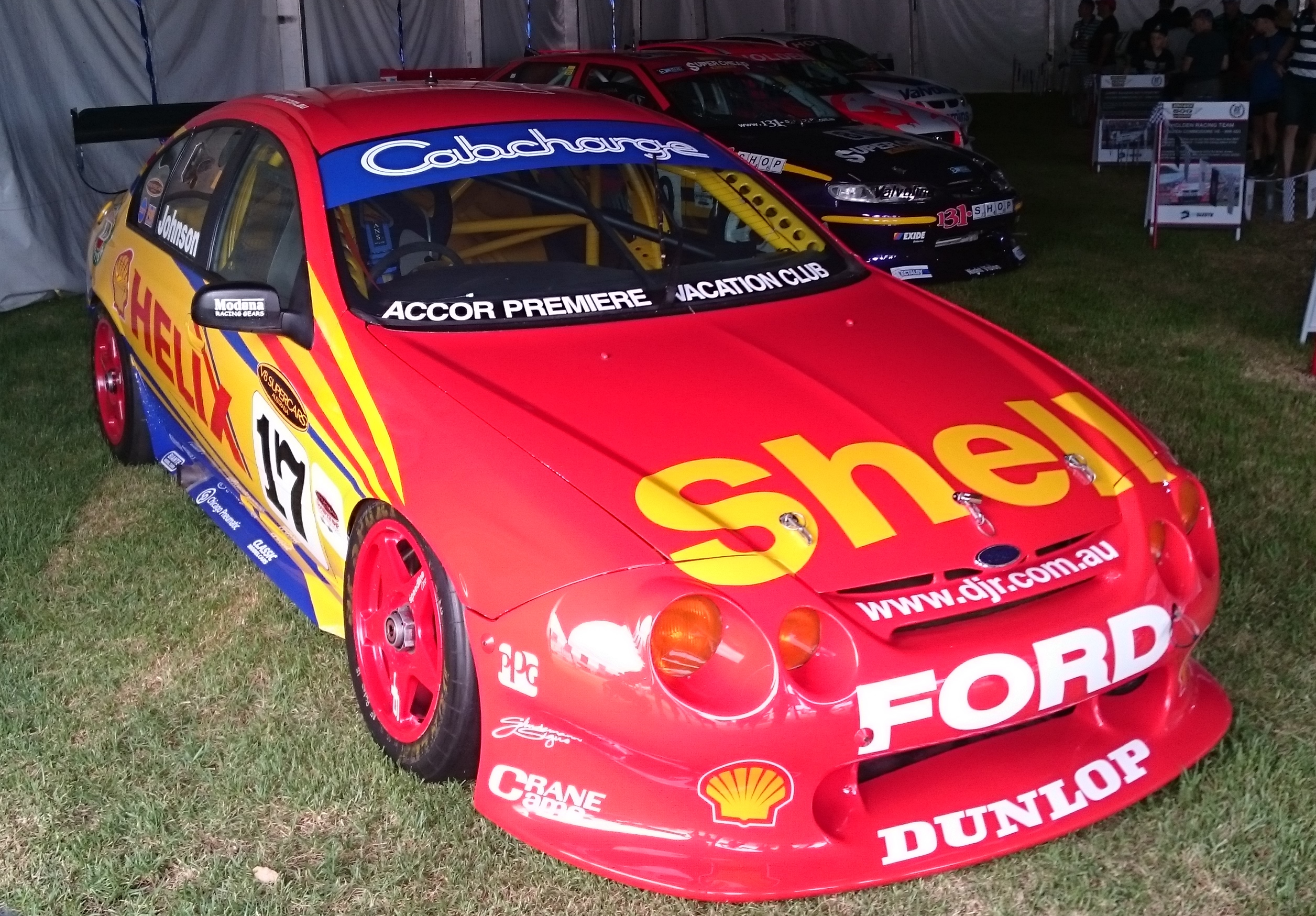
The Dick Johnson Racing Ford Falcon AU with which Steven Johnson and Paul Radisich won the 2001 Queensland 500. The car is pictured in 2018

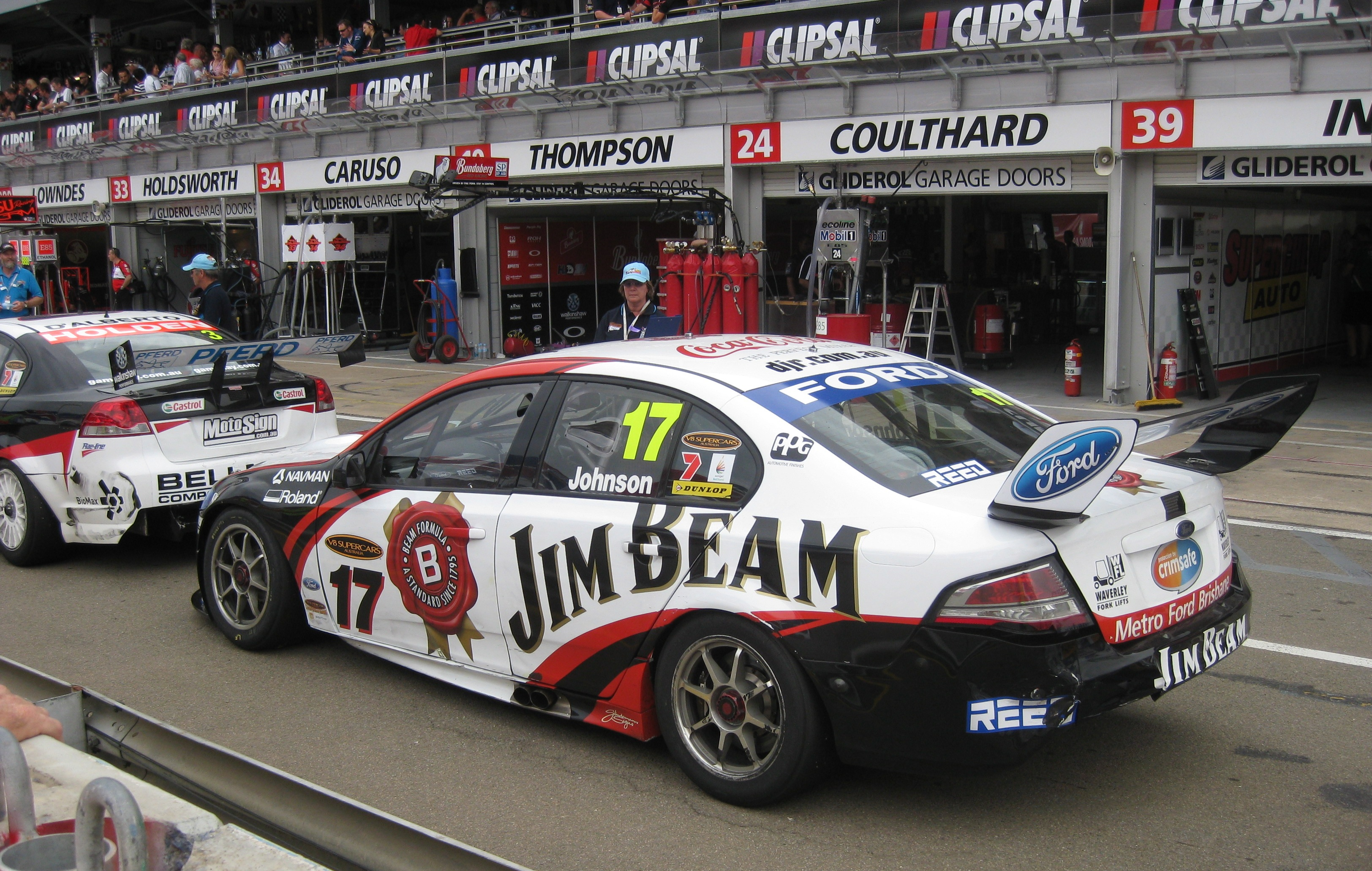
The Ford FG Falcon of Steven Johnson at the 2010 Clipsal 500

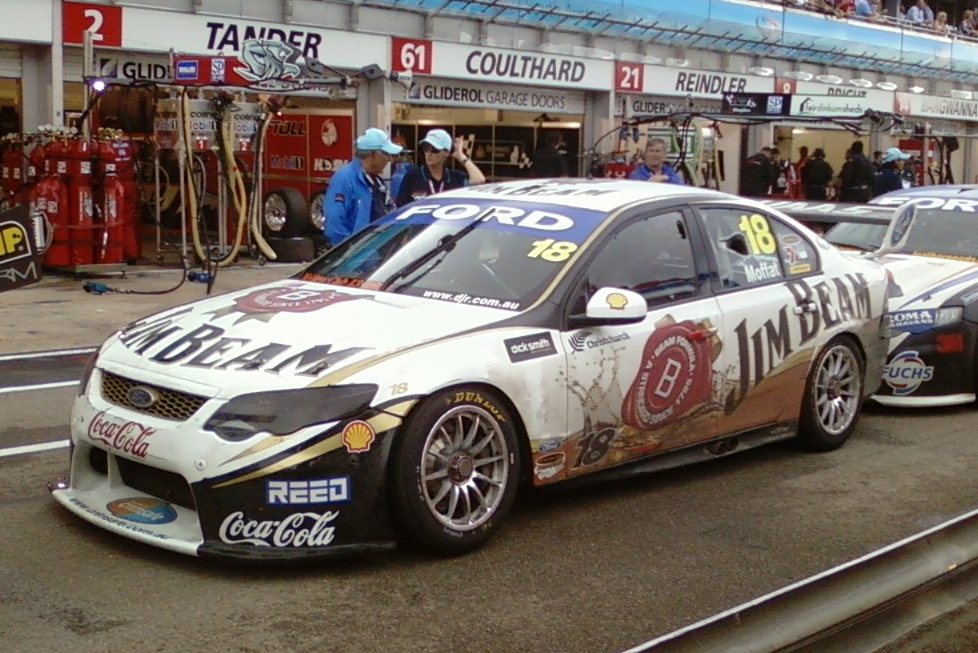
The Ford FG Falcon of James Moffat at the 2011 Clipsal 500

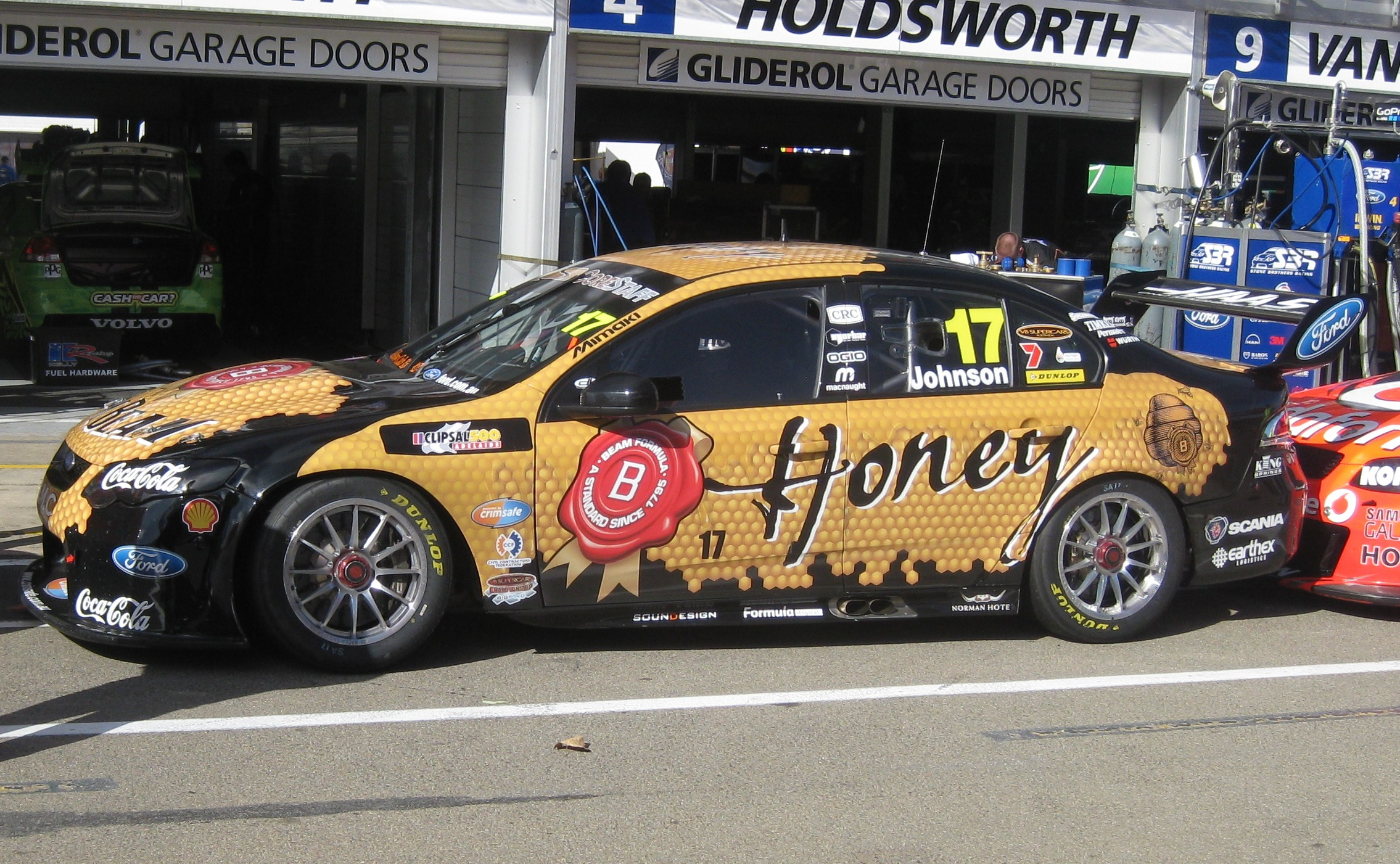
The Ford FG Falcon of Steven Johnson at the 2012 Clipsal 500

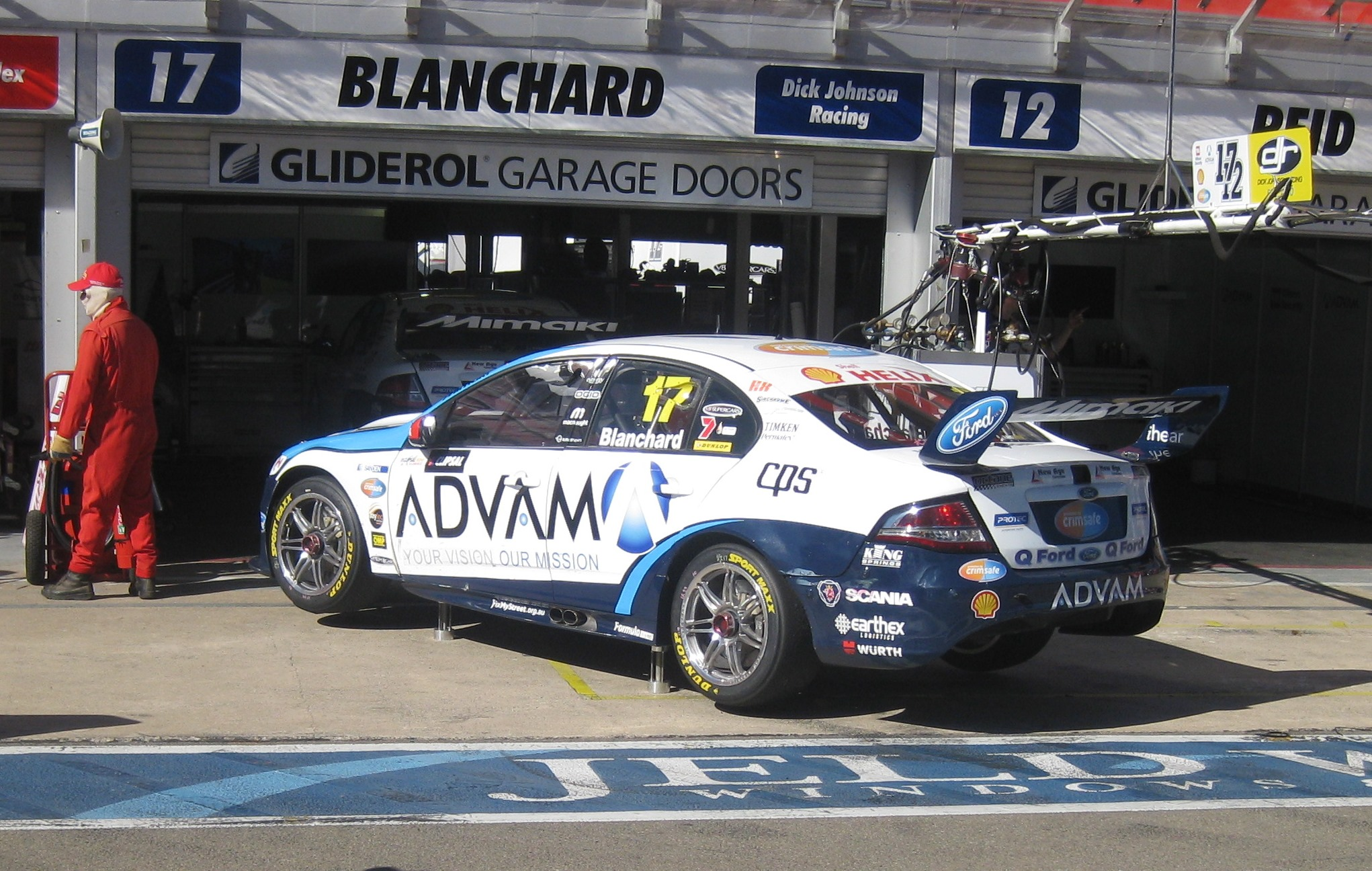
The Ford FG Falcon of Tim Blanchard at the 2013 Clipsal 500

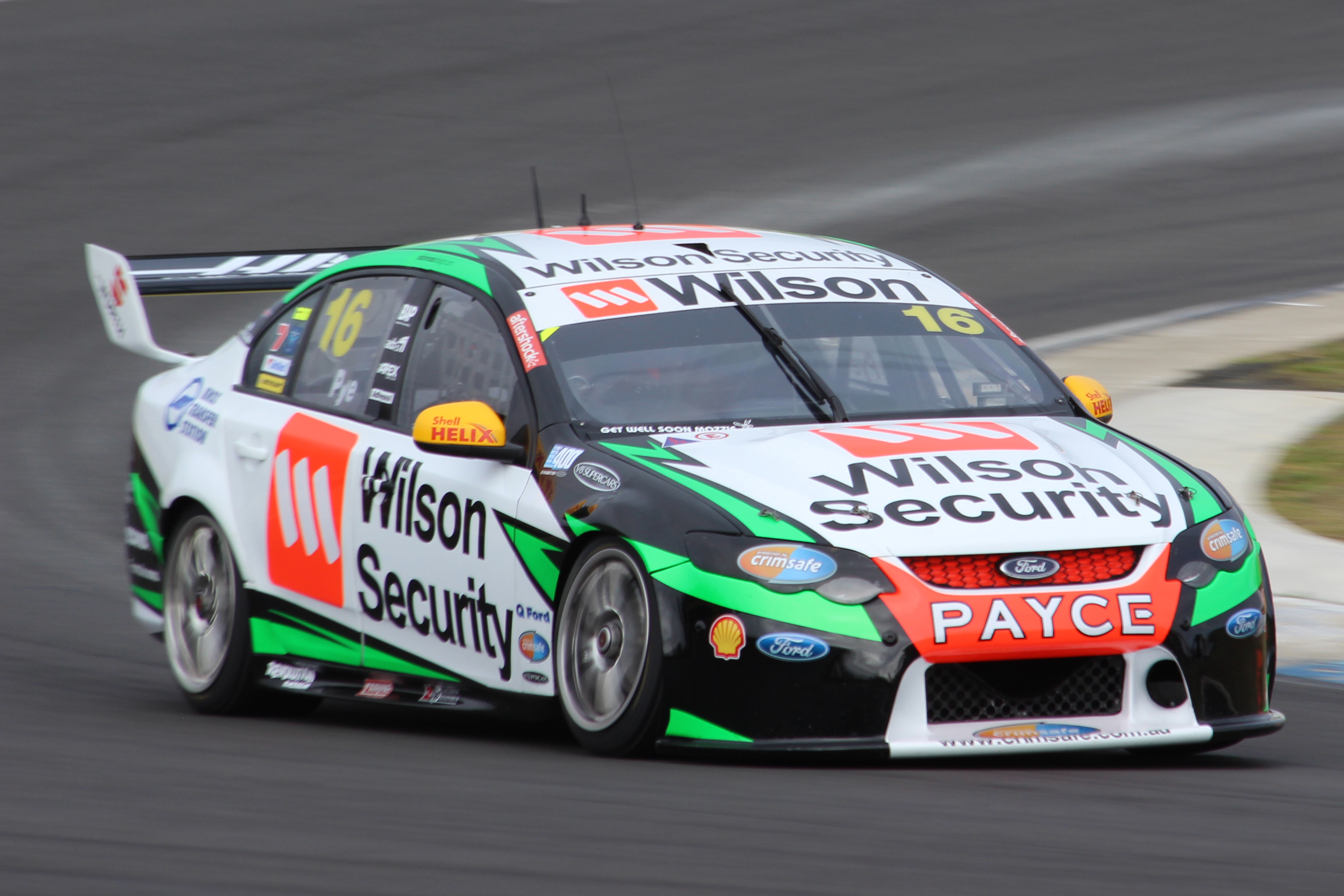
The Ford FG Falcon of Scott Pye at the 2014 Sydney Motorsport Park 400

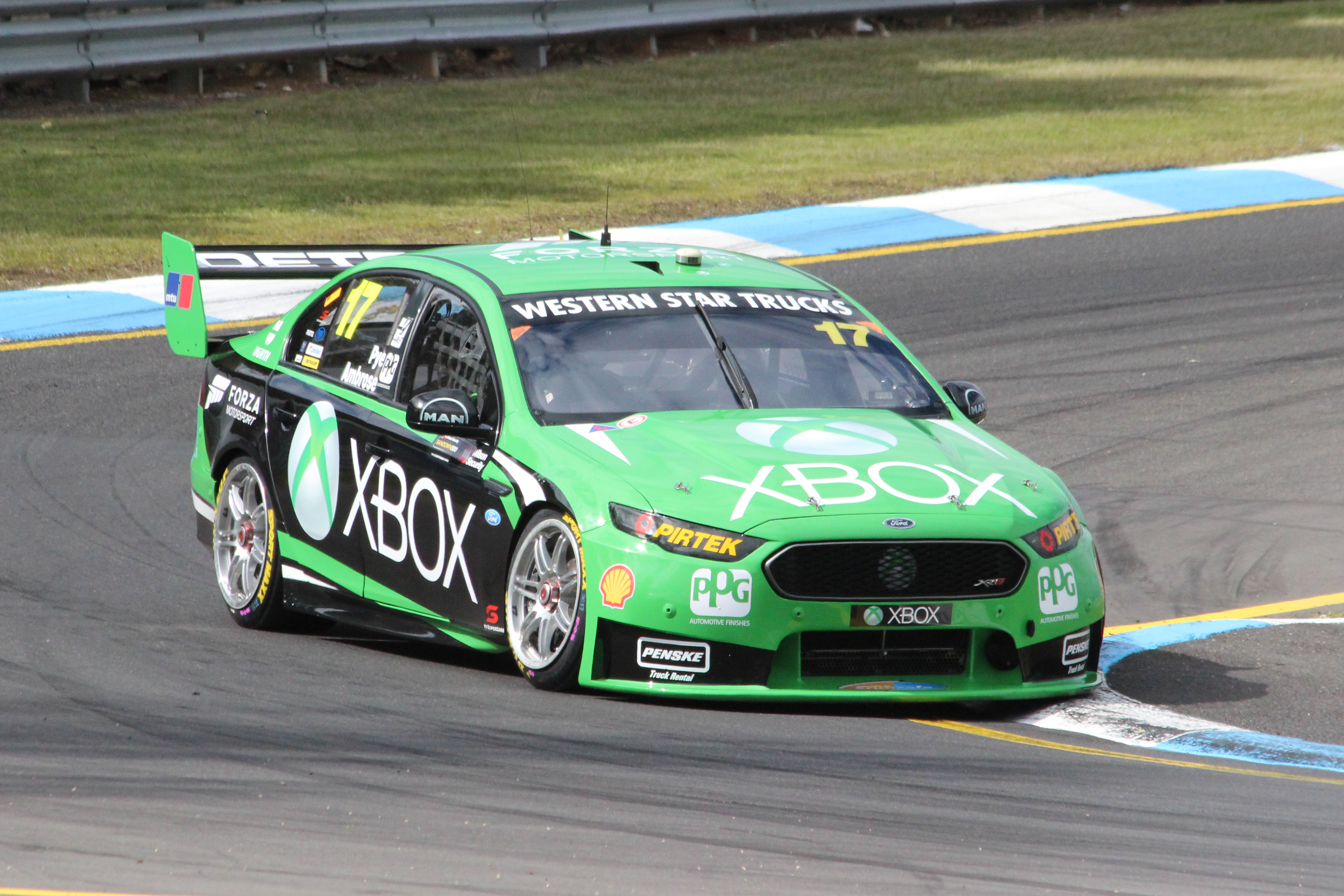
The Ford FG X Falcon of Scott Pye and Marcos Ambrose at the 2015 Wilson Security Sandown 500

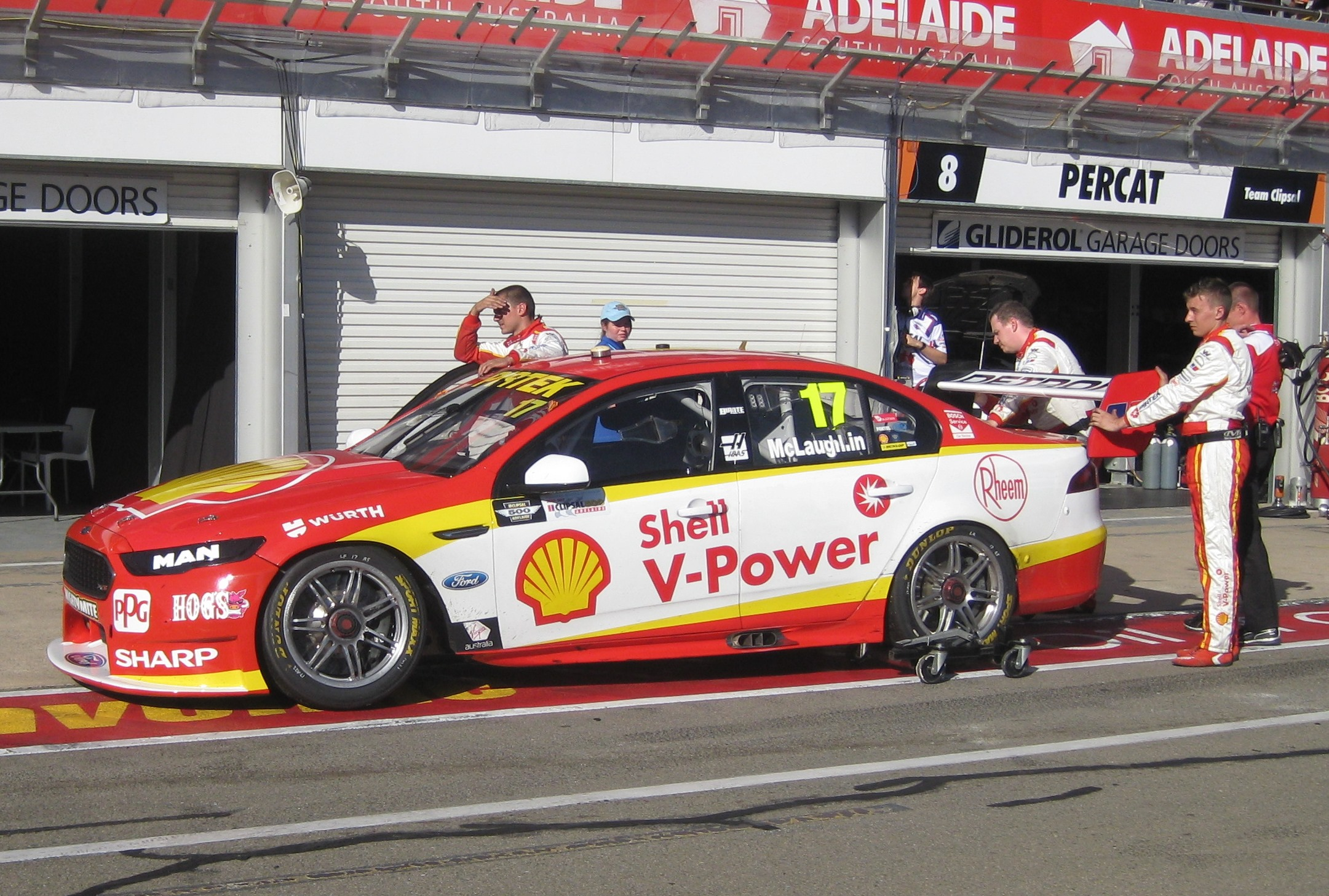
The Ford FG X Falcon of Scott McLaughlin at the 2017 Clipsal 500 Adelaide

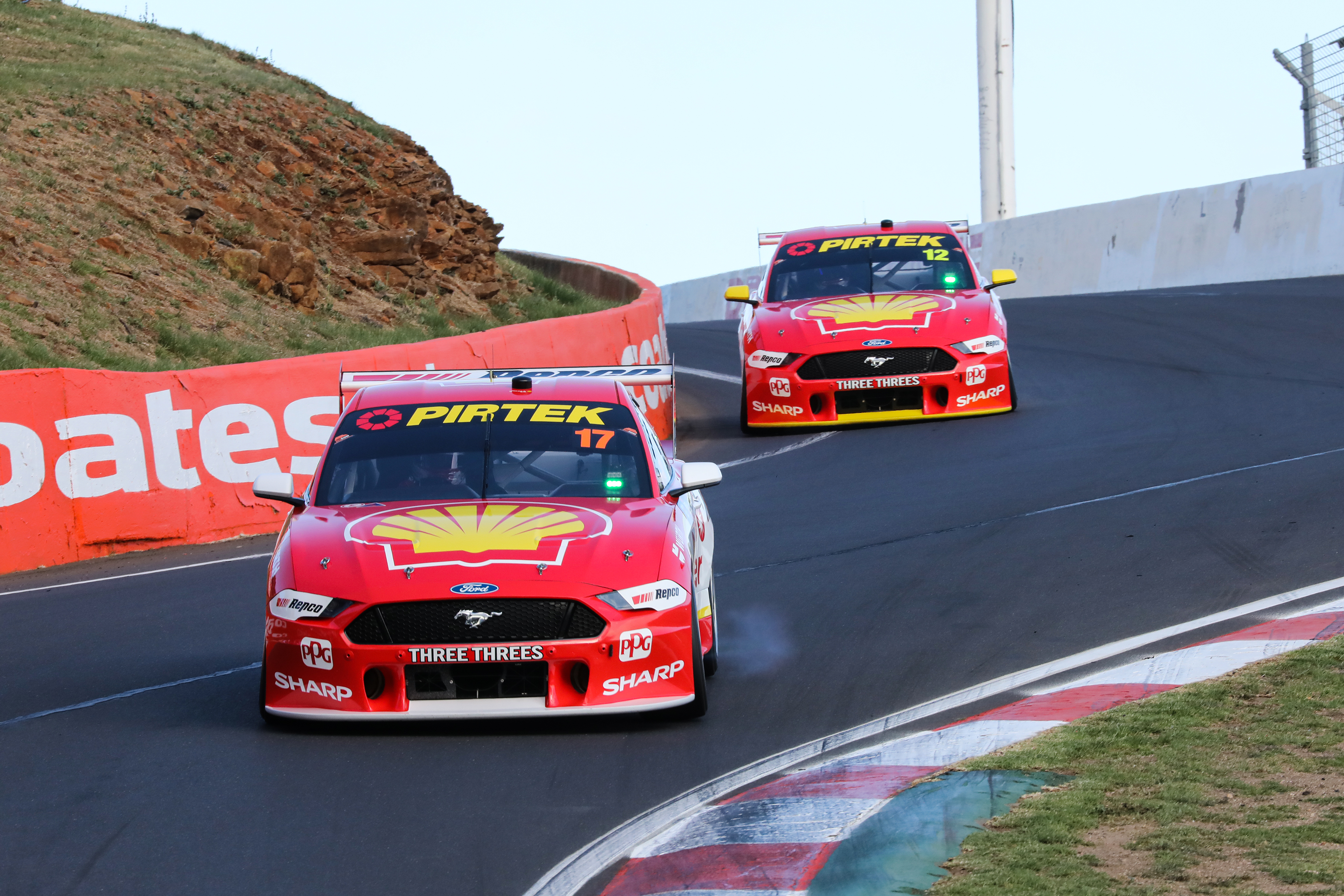
The Ford Mustang GT of Scott McLaughlin and Fabian Coulthard at the 2019 Bathurst 1000

For the new all V8 era, DJR switched to Ford EB Falcons. Aside from John Bowe winning the opening 1993 round at Amaroo Park the team remained winless until it won both the Sandown and Bathurst endurance races in 1994, as well as the season ending Australian Grand Prix support races. In 1995 Bowe won the championship. A repeat victory at Sandown that year augured well for another Bathurst win until an incident with Glenn Seton forced the number 17 Falcon from the track while leading.

At the end of 1995 team manager Ross Stone and chief engineer Jim Stone left to form Alan Jones Racing. While the Holden Racing Team dominated the 1996 season, Bowe finished the championship in second and combined with Johnson to finish second at Bathurst. Consistency in the 1997 championship enabled Bowe to again claim the runner-up position in the championship. DJR's only win in 1998 was by Bowe at Winton. For the endurance races Johnson and Bowe drove separate cars for the first time since 1988 with Steven Johnson joining his father.

At the end of 1998, Bowe left DJR after eleven years to join PAE Motorsport. Paul Radisich was hired as his replacement. While the team struggled in the 1999 Australian Touring Car Championship developing new Falcon AUs, the team was competitive at the Bathurst 1000 with Radisich and Steven Ellery leading most of the race until making contact late in the race with a slower car. In his final race, Dick Johnson finished fourth with son Steven.

==== 2000s ====
In 2000 Steven Johnson took over the number 17 Falcon from his retiring father. Radisich teamed with Jason Bright to finish second at the Bathurst 1000. In 2001, Johnson won the Canberra 400 and teamed with Radisich to win the 2001 Queensland 500. This would be the team's last win for seven years.

In 2002 a third car was entered at selected events for Greg Ritter. At the end of 2002 Paul Radisich left the team. Max Wilson, Warren Luff and Glenn Seton would each complete one year stints as the driver of the second car between 2003 and 2005. At the end of 2004, Shell brought their 17-year naming rights sponsorship of the team to an end.

For 2005 sponsorship from Westpoint Corporation was secured. However, by the beginning of 2006 Westpoint was in receivership. Sponsorship for the 2006 season came from two of Dick Johnson's own business ventures, FirstRock Mortgage Centre and V8 Telecom with Will Davison driving the second car. The ventures were not successful and by the end of the year, the team's long term viability was in doubt. As a result, businessman and sponsor Charlie Schwerkolt bought a 50% shareholding in the team.

For 2007 sponsorship from Jim Beam was secured with the year highlighted by a third place at Bathurst. At the Bahrain round, Johnson finished third and Davison fourth. In 2008, Davison won the Eastern Creek round, the team's first win since the 2001 Queensland 500.

In 2009, James Courtney replaced Davison. Two Triple Eight built Falcon FGs were purchased with Courtney winning at the Townsville 400 and Sydney 500.

==== 2010s ====
In 2010, James Courtney won the series. A third customer entry was prepared for Tekno Autosports, driven by Jonathon Webb. By mid-season owners Dick Johnson and Charlie Schwerkolt were reported to no longer be on speaking terms, and the team became fractured. Team manager Adrian Burgess announced he would join Triple Eight in 2011, and as a result of a clause in his contract giving him an 'out' if Burgess left, Courtney also left at the end of 2010 after winning the series.

At the end of 2010, Johnson and Schwerkolt dissolved their partnership. Scherkolt retained ownership of one Racing Entitlement Contract (REC) which was leased back to DJR for 2011 and 2012.

For 2011, James Moffat was signed to replace Courtney.

For 2012, the team expanded to a four car team, preparing customer cars for Triple F Racing with Dean Fiore driving and Paul Morris Motorsport with Steve Owen. At the end of the year, Jim Beam elected not to renew it sponsorship, the REC leased from Team 18 was returned, while the Paul Morris Motorsport REC was sold to Lucas Dumbrell Motorsport.

A sponsor was lined up for 2013, but it was conditional on V8 Supercars confirming its television arrangements by the end of 2012. As this did not happen, the deal lapsed and again DJR's future appeared in jeopardy. A last minute sponsorship with Wilson Security was secured and the team appeared with two entries for Tim Blanchard and Jonny Reid, with Steven Johnson moving into position of General Manager. Wilson Security remained with the team as title sponsor for the remainder of 2013. Reid was replaced by Chaz Mostert before the Wanneroo Raceway round of the championship. Mostert won a race at the Queensland Raceway round.

For 2014, Scott Pye and David Wall were recruited to drive. The REC leased from Triple F Racing was returned and another purchased from Paul Morris Motorsport.

=== DJR Team Penske ===
In September 2014, it was announced a 51% stake in the team had been sold to United States businessman and racer Roger Penske, who is the Australian distributor for MAN Truck & Bus, Western Star Trucks, MTU Friedrichshafen, and Detroit Diesel. The remaining 49% was retained by Johnson, Steve Brabeck and Ryan Story. The team was renamed DJR Team Penske. Joining the team at the final event of the 2014 season ahead of a full 2015 program was former V8 Supercar champion and NASCAR regular Marcos Ambrose. It was the first time that Team Penske expanded its involvement to a non-US based championship since their days in Formula 1.

In 2015, the team scaled back to one Ford Falcon FG X with Marcos Ambrose to drive. Prior to Round 2 Ambrose stepped aside from full-time driving, handing the duties of Car No. 17 to Scott Pye. Ambrose returned as the team's co driver for the Pirtek Enduro Cup. The team scored one race podium in 2015, for Pye at the 2015 ITM 500 Auckland, and finished 12th in the Teams' Championship.

In 2016, the team expanded to two cars, with Pye returning and Fabian Coulthard joining the team. They scored two podiums each, with Coulthard finishing 12th in the Drivers' Championship and Pye finishing 15th. DJR Team Penske ranked fifth in the Teams' Championship.

In 2017, Scott McLaughlin replaced Pye, joined by new engineer Ludo Lacroix. Having operated a rotating sponsorship model for the previous two seasons largely with Penske Corporation subsidiaries, in 2017 Shell returned as the team's full-time title sponsor. After losing the Drivers Championship title to Jamie Whincup in the last race of the 2017 season after he was given a penalty for colliding with Craig Lowndes (Whincup's teammate at Holden team Triple Eight), Scott McLaughlin won the Drivers Championship in 2018 in Car No. 17 after a closely contested season-long battle with Shane van Gisbergen. In 2019, the team along with Tickford Racing homologated the Ford Mustang GT, replacing the retiring Falcon.

In October 2020, it was announced that Penske was divesting from the team, selling its stake in the team to Ryan Story with it to be return to being named Dick Johnson Racing. Later, with its sale to Story, the team restored its original name.

Brett and Shaun Ralph — their interest held through the Melbourne Aces Baseball Club — have been majority shareholders since January 2023. Dick Johnson and Executive Chairman Dr Ryan Story retained significant shareholdings, and maintain their day-to-day positions overseeing operations of the Shell V-Power Racing Team.

== DJR performance cars ==
DJR had various attempts at building road cars, with the XE Grand Prix and BA DJR 320 being the most successful models. Johnson planned on building a XF Falcon, but like the XE before it, Ford showed no interest in it, meaning that only one prototype XF was built. Johnson tried again with a model built upon the EA in an attempt to draw attention from Ford, who were looking for a performance partnership in 1990. Tickford won out the contract, and again, only one EA DJR was completed.

=== XE Grand Prix ===
In 1982, Johnson partnered up Turbocharging expert David Inall, to produce a turbocharged performance version of the 4.1 litre six. The idea was to create a performance arm for Ford Australia in the style of Holden Dealer Team, in the wake of Ford's waning interest in performance cars and the discontinuation of the V8. Ford, unwilling to warrant the modifications however, declined to invest in the product.

The result was the Grand Prix Falcon that came with 190 kW, and was capable of mid 14-second 1/4-mile times. All came in distinctive "Tru Blue" paintwork, and a styling kit consisting of fender flares and Front and Rear spoilers. The interior and drive train featured parts from the European Sports Pack options that were available for the Falcon at the time.

=== DJR320 ===
In 2003, DJR joined with Herrod Motorsport to build the DJR 320, a performance car based on the BA XR8 falcon. A body styling kit was added to the existing XR parts, consisting of new side skirts, and front and rear spoiler lips. Herrod retuned the ECU, installed DJR camshafts, high-flow dual exhaust system with twin tailpipes and a cold-air intake; this increased the engine output from 260 kW to 320 kW. Suspension was improved by the use of adjustable dampers, and larger brakes rounded off the package. Only 14 were built.

== Other interests ==
The Dick Johnson Group also ran financial, real estate, and telecommunications services, which have since been sold.

DJR is based in Stayplton on the Gold Coast. The factory also housed a museum of the team's history. In 2006 Johnson sold his museum racing vehicles to car collector David Bowden. By arrangement with Bowden, a selection of Bowden's significant racing cars will rotate through the museum in DJR's workshop.

== Australian Touring Car and Supercars drivers ==
The following is a list of drivers who have driven for the team in the Australian Touring Car Championship and Supercars Championship, in order of their first appearance. It also includes drivers who drove for the team in the Bathurst 1000 before it became a championship event. Drivers who only drove for the team on a part-time basis are listed in italics.

- (Australia) Dick Johnson (1980–2000)
- (Australia) John French (1980–82, 1984)
- (Australia) Kevin Bartlett (1983)
- (Australia) Larry Perkins (1985)
- (Australia) Gregg Hansford (1986–87)
- (New Zealand) Neville Crichton (1987–88)
- (New Zealand) Neal Lowe (1987)
- (Australia) Charlie O'Brien (1987, 1995–96)
- (Australia) John Bowe (1988–98)
- (Australia) Alfredo Costanzo (1988)
- (Australia) John Smith (1988)
- (United Kingdom) Robb Gravett (1988–89)
- (United Kingdom) Jeff Allam (1989–90)
- (Australia) Tony Noske (1989)
- (New Zealand) Paul Radisich (1990–91, 1993, 1999–2002)
- (Australia) Terry Shiel (1990–91)
- (New Zealand) Kayne Scott (1991)
- (New Zealand) Gregg Taylor (1991)
- (Australia) Greg Crick (1992)
- (Australia) Cameron McConville (1993, 1998)
- (Australia) Allan Grice (1994)
- (Australia) Steven Johnson (1994–2012, 2014)
- (United States) Tommy Kendall (1996)
- (New Zealand) Craig Baird (1997)
- (Australia) Steven Ellery (1999)
- (Australia) Cameron McLean (2000–01)
- (Australia) Jason Bright (2000)
- (Australia) Paul Stokell (2001)
- (Australia) Greg Ritter (2001–02)
- (Australia) Alan Jones (2002)
- (Brazil) Max Wilson (2003)
- (Australia) Warren Luff (2003–04, 2008–10)
- (Australia) Owen Kelly (2004)
- (Australia) David Brabham (2004)
- (Australia) Glenn Seton (2005)
- (Australia) Dean Canto (2005–06)
- (Australia) Will Davison (2006–08, 2021–2025)
- (Australia) Alex Davison (2006–07, 2021–2023)
- (Australia) Grant Denyer (2006)
- (Australia) Andrew Thompson (2007)
- (Australia) Steve Owen (2008)
- (Australia) James Courtney (2009–10)
- (Australia) Jonathon Webb (2009)
- (Australia) Marcus Marshall (2011)
- (United Kingdom) Dario Franchitti (2010)
- (Australia) David Besnard (2011)
- (New Zealand) Matt Halliday (2011–12)
- (Australia) James Moffat (2011–12)
- (United States) Joey Hand (2011)
- (Denmark) Allan Simonsen (2012)
- (Germany) Dirk Müller (2012)
- (Australia) Tim Blanchard (2013)
- (New Zealand) Jonny Reid (2013)
- (Australia) Chaz Mostert (2013)
- (Australia) Dale Wood (2013)
- (Australia) Ashley Walsh (2013–14)
- (Australia) Scott Pye (2014–16)
- (Australia) David Wall (2014)
- (Australia) Marcos Ambrose (2014–15)
- (New Zealand) Fabian Coulthard (2016–20)
- (Australia) Tony D'Alberto (2016–present)
- (Australia) Luke Youlden (2016)
- (New Zealand) Scott McLaughlin (2017–20)
- (France) Alexandre Prémat (2017–19)
- (Australia) Tim Slade (2020)
- (Australia) Anton de Pasquale (2021–2024)
- (Switzerland) Simona de Silvestro (2023)
- (Australia) Kai Allen (2023–2024)
- (Australia) Brodie Kostecki (2025–present)
- (Australia) Todd Hazelwood (2025–present)
- (Australia) Rylan Gray (2026–present)

== Results ==
=== Car No. 18 results ===
Year	Driver	No.	Make	1	2	3	4	5	6	7	8	9	10	11	12	13	14	15	16	17	18	19	20	21	22	23	24	25	26	27	28	29	30	31	32	33	34	35	36	37	38	39	40	Position	Pts
1987	Gregg Hansford	18	Ford	CAL; R1; Ret	SYM; R2; 6	LAK; R3; DSQ	BAR; R4; 5	ADE; R5; Ret	SUR; R6; Ret	CAL; R7; Ret	AMA; R8; 8	ORA; R9; Ret																																10th	25
1988	John Bowe	18	Ford	CAL; R1; Ret	SYM; R2; 2	WIN; R3; 1	BAR; R4; 3	ADE; R5; 2	SUR; R6; Ret	CAL; R7; 2	AMA; R8; 1	ORA; R9; 2																																2nd	112
1989	John Bowe	18	Ford	AMA; R1; 1	SYM; R2; 3	LAK; R3; 3	BAR; R4; 1	MAL; R5; 3	SAN; R6; 3	WIN; R7; 8	ORA; R8; 3																																	2nd	94
1990	John Bowe	18	Ford	AMA; R1; 2	SYM; R2; 3	PHI; R3; 2	WIN; R4; 6	LAK; R5; 4	MAL; R6; 14	BAR; R7; 6	ORA; R8; 5																																	5th	72
1991	John Bowe	18	Ford	SAN; R1; 3	SYM; R2; 11	BAR; R3; 8	LAK; R4; 10	WIN; R5; 7	AMA; R6; 4	MAL; R7; 7	LAK; R8; Ret	ORA; R9; Ret																																7th	34
1992	John Bowe	18	Ford	AMA; R1; 6	AMA; R2; 10	SAN; R3; 1	SAN; R4; 1	SYM; R5; Ret	SYM; R6; DNS	WIN; R7; 13	WIN; R8; 5	LAK; R9; 9	LAK; R10; 3	EAS; R11; 1	EAS; R12; 1	MAL; R13; 5	MAL; R14; 5	BAR; R15; 1	BAR; R16; 1	ORA; R17; 15	ORA; R18; 5																							4th	175
1993	John Bowe	18	Ford	AMA; R1; 4	AMA; R2; 1	SYM; R3; 7	SYM; R4; 3	PHI; R5; 2	PHI; R6; 3	LAK; R7; 4	LAK; R8; 3	WIN; R9; DSQ	WIN; R10; 7	EAS; R11; 2	EAS; R12; 3	MAL; R13; 5	MAL; R14; 3	BAR; R15; 4	BAR; R16; Ret	ORA; R17; 2	ORA; R18; 8																							3rd	140
1994	John Bowe	18	Ford	AMA; R1	AMA; R2	SAN; R3	SAN; R4	SYM; R5	SYM; R6	PHI; R7	PHI; R8	LAK; R9	LAK; R10	WIN; R11	WIN; R12	EAS; R13	EAS; R14	MAL; R15	MAL; R16	BAR; R17	BAR; R18	ORA; R19	ORA; R20																					7th	156
1995	John Bowe	18	Ford	SAN; R1	SAN; R2	SYM; R3	SYM; R4	BAT; R5	BAT; R6	PHI; R7	PHI; R8	LAK; R9	LAK; R10	WIN; R11	WIN; R12	EAS; R13	EAS; R14	MAL; R15	MAL; R16	BAR; R17	BAR; R18	ORA; R19	ORA; R20																					1st	314
1996	John Bowe	18	Ford	EAS; R1	EAS; R2	EAS; R3	SAN; R4	SAN; R5	SAN; R6	BAT; R7	BAT; R8	BAT; R9	SYM; R10	SYM; R11	SYM; R12	PHI; R13	PHI; R14	PHI; R15	CAL; R16	CAL; R17	CAL; R18	LAK; R19	LAK; R20	LAK; R21	BAR; R22	BAR; R23	BAR; R24	MAL; R25	MAL; R26	MAL; R27	ORA; R28	ORA; R29	ORA; R30											2nd	344
1997	John Bowe	18	Ford	CAL; R1	CAL; R2	CAL; R3	PHI; R4	PHI; R5	PHI; R6	SAN; R7	SAN; R8	SAN; R9	SYM; R10	SYM; R11	SYM; R12	WIN; R13	WIN; R14	WIN; R15	EAS; R16	EAS; R17	EAS; R18	LAK; R19	LAK; R20	LAK; R21	BAR; R22	BAR; R23	BAR; R24	MAL; R25	MAL; R26	MAL; R27	ORA; R28	ORA; R29	ORA; R30											2nd	608
1998	John Bowe	18	Ford	SAN; R1	SAN; R2	SAN; R3	SYM; R4	SYM; R5	SYM; R6	LAK; R7	LAK; R8	LAK; R9	PHI; R10	PHI; R11	PHI; R12	WIN; R13	WIN; R14	WIN; R15	MAL; R16	MAL; R17	MAL; R18	BAR; R19	BAR; R20	BAR; R21	CAL; R22	CAL; R23	CAL; R24	HDV; R25	HDV; R26	HDV; R27	ORA; R28	ORA; R29	ORA; R30											5th	684
1999	Paul Radisich	18	Ford	EAS; R1	EAS; R2	EAS; R3	ADE; R4	BAR; R5	BAR; R6	BAR; R7	PHI; R8	PHI; R9	PHI; R10	HDV; R11	HDV; R12	HDV; R13	SAN; R14	SAN; R15	SAN; R16	QLD; R17	QLD; R18	QLD; R19	CAL; R20	CAL; R21	CAL; R22	SYM; R23	SYM; R24	SYM; R25	WIN; R26	WIN; R27	WIN; R28	ORA; R29	ORA; R30	ORA; R31	QLD; R32	BAT; R33								16th	812
2000	Paul Radisich	18	Ford	PHI; R1	PHI; R2	BAR; R3	BAR; R4	BAR; R5	ADE; R6	ADE; R7	EAS; R8	EAS; R9	EAS; R10	HDV; R11	HDV; R12	HDV; R13	CAN; R14	CAN; R15	CAN; R16	QLD; R17	QLD; R18	QLD; R19	WIN; R20	WIN; R21	WIN; R22	ORA; R23	ORA; R24	ORA; R25	CAL; R26	CAL; R27	CAL; R28	QLD; R29	SAN; R30	SAN; R31	SAN; R32	BAT; R33								4th	1260
2001	Paul Radisich	18	Ford	PHI; R1	PHI; R2	ADE; R3	ADE; R4	EAS; R5	EAS; R6	HDV; R7	HDV; R8	HDV; R9	CAN; R10	CAN; R11	CAN; R12	BAR; R13	BAR; R14	BAR; R15	CAL; R16	CAL; R17	CAL; R18	ORA; R19	ORA; R20	QLD; R21	WIN; R22	WIN; R23	BAT; R24	PUK; R25	PUK; R26	PUK; R27	SAN; R28	SAN; R29	SAN; R30											7th	2109
2002	Paul Radisich	18	Ford	ADE; R1	ADE; R2	PHI; R3	PHI; R4	EAS; R5	EAS; R6	EAS; R7	HDV; R8	HDV; R9	HDV; R10	CAN; R11	CAN; R12	CAN; R13	BAR; R14	BAR; R15	BAR; R16	ORA; R17	ORA; R18	WIN; R19	WIN; R20	QLD; R21	BAT; R22	SUR; R23	SUR; R24	PUK; R25	PUK; R26	PUK; R27	SAN; R28	SAN; R29												26th	398
2003	Max Wilson	18	Ford	ADE; R1; 26	ADE; R1; Ret	PHI; R3; 16	EAS; R4; 16	WIN; R5; 9	BAR; R6; 24	BAR; R7; 17	BAR; R8; 13	HDV; R9; Ret	HDV; R10; 20	HDV; R11; 16	QLD; R12; 24	ORA; R13; Ret	SAN; R14; 19	BAT; R15; 12	SUR; R16; 9	SUR; R17; 23	PUK; R18; 18	PUK; R19; 24	PUK; R20; 19	EAS; R21; 5	EAS; R22; 3																			17th	1214
2004	Warren Luff	18	Ford	ADE; R1; 11	ADE; R2; Ret	EAS; R3; 21	PUK; R4; 24	PUK; R5; 27	PUK; R6; 23	HDV; R7; 22	HDV; R8; 22	HDV; R9; 24	BAR; R10; 15	BAR; R11; Ret	BAR; R12; 23	QLD; R13; 16	WIN; R14; 20	ORA; R15; 24	ORA; R16; 20	SAN; R17; 3	BAT; R18; 7	SUR; R19; Ret	SUR; R20; 26	SYM; R21; 16	SYM; R22; 12	SYM; R23; 9	EAS; R24; 15	EAS; R25; 14	EAS; R26; 20															21st	1149
2005	Glenn Seton	18	Ford	ADE; R1; 9	ADE; R2; 25	PUK; R3; 26	PUK; R4; 13	PUK; R5; 12	BAR; R6; 12	BAR; R7; 15	BAR; R8; 9	EAS; R9; 20	EAS; R10; 27	SHA; R11; 14	SHA; R12; 7	SHA; R13; 24	HDV; R14; 8	HDV; R15; 7	HDV; R16; 5	QLD; R17; 11	ORA; R18; 18	ORA; R19; 13	SAN; R20; 12	BAT; R21; 9	SUR; R22; 23	SUR; R23; 23	SUR; R24; 20	SYM; R25; 22	SYM; R26; 19	SYM; R27; 20	PHI; R28; 29	PHI; R29; 24	PHI; R30; 11											15th	1353
2006	Will Davison	18	Ford	ADE; R1; 14	ADE; R2; 13	PUK; R3; 18	PUK; R4; 8	PUK; R5; 28	BAR; R6; 16	BAR; R7; 22	BAR; R8; 16	WIN; R9; 14	WIN; R10; DSQ	WIN; R11; 23	HDV; R12; 13	HDV; R13; Ret	HDV; R14; 14	QLD; R15; 19	QLD; R16; 19	QLD; R17; 12	ORA; R18; 26	ORA; R19; 22	ORA; R20; 8	SAN; R21; 4	BAT; R22; Ret	SUR; R23; 14	SUR; R24; 19	SUR; R25; 17	SYM; R26; 9	SYM; R27; 6	SYM; R28; 12	BHR; R29; Ret	BHR; R30; Ret	BHR; R31; Ret	PHI; R32; 6	PHI; R33; 7	PHI; R34; Ret							19th	1943
2007	Will Davison	18	Ford	ADE; R1; Ret	ADE; R2; 9	BAR; R3; 6	BAR; R4; 5	BAR; R5; 6	PUK; R6; 11	PUK; R7; 8	PUK; R8; 6	WIN; R9; Ret	WIN; R10; 14	WIN; R11; 9	EAS; R12; 14	EAS; R13; 9	EAS; R14; 10	HDV; R15; EX	HDV; R16; 7	HDV; R17; 7	QLD; R18; 6	QLD; R19; 5	QLD; R20; 4	ORA; R21; 6	ORA; R22; 8	ORA; R23; 16	SAN; R24; Ret	BAT; R25; 3	SUR; R26; 11	SUR; R27; 18	SUR; R28; 11	BHR; R29; 8	BHR; R30; 3	BHR; R31; 5	SYM; R32; 9	SYM; R33; 11	SYM; R34; 14	PHI; R35; 9	PHI; R36; 9	PHI; R37; 8				11th	343
2008	Will Davison	18	Ford	ADE; R1; 7	ADE; R2; Ret	EAS; R3; 2	EAS; R4; 1	EAS; R5; 6	HAM; R6; 9	HAM; R7; 22	HAM; R8; Ret	BAR; R9; 8	BAR; R10; 5	BAR; R11; 6	SAN; R12; Ret	SAN; R13; 11	SAN; R14; 7	HDV; R15; 8	HDV; R16; 10	HDV; R17; 5	QLD; R18; 6	QLD; R19; 5	QLD; R20; 5	WIN; R21; 2	WIN; R22; 1	WIN; R23; 4	PHI; Q 2	PHI; R24; 3	BAT; R25; 6	SUR; R26; 7	SUR; R27; Ret	SUR; R28; R10	BHR; R29; Ret	BHR; R30; 10	BHR; R31; 6	SYM; R32; 4	SYM; R33; 5	SYM; R34; 6	ORA; R35; 10	ORA; R36; 15	ORA; R37; 21			5th	2495
2009	James Courtney	18	Ford	ADE; R1; 20	ADE; R2; 24	HAM; R3; 13	HAM; R4; 2	WIN; R5; Ret	WIN; R6; 6	SYM; R7; 30	SYM; R8; Ret	HDV; R9; 8	HDV; R10; 12	TOW; R11; Ret	TOW; R12; 1	SAN; R13; 2	SAN; R14; 8	QLD; R15; 2	QLD; R16; 8	PHI; Q 4	PHI; R17; 4	BAT; R18; 24	SUR; R19; Ret	SUR; R20; 16	SUR; R21; 5	SUR; R22; 3	PHI; R23; 9	PHI; R24; 4	BAR; R25; 4	BAR; R26; 10	SYD; R27; 17	SYD; R28; 1												7th	2192
2010	James Courtney	18	Ford	YMC; R1; 4	YMC; R2; 6	BHR; R3; 6	BHR; R4; 7	ADE; R5; 2	ADE; R6; 2	HAM; R7; 3	HAM; R8; 21	QLD; R9; 1	QLD; R10; 1	WIN; R11; 1	WIN; R12; 1	HDV; R13; 5	HDV; R14; 4	TOW; R15; 5	TOW; R16; 2	PHI; Q 3	PHI; R17; 12	BAT; R18; 5	SUR; R19; 10	SUR; R20; 4	SYM; R21; 11	SYM; R22; 12	SAN; R23; 4	SAN; R24; 1	SYD; R25; 15	SYD; R26; 14														1st	3055
2011	James Moffat	18	Ford	YMC; R1; 16	YMC; R2; Ret	ADE; R3; Ret	ADE; R4; 22	HAM; R5; 9	HAM; R6; 17	BAR; R7; 18	BAR; R8; 17	BAR; R9; 21	WIN; R10; 19	WIN; R11; 9	HID; R12; 14	HID; R13; 13	TOW; R14; 17	TOW; R15; 15	QLD; R16; 10	QLD; R17; 9	QLD; R18; 4	PHI; QR; 24	PHI; R19; 25	BAT; R20; 25	SUR; R21; 4	SUR; R22; Ret	SYM; R23; 20	SYM; R24; 18	SAN; R25; Ret	SAN; R26; 25	SYD; R27; 8	SYD; R28; Ret												23rd	1306
2012	James Moffat	18	Ford	ADE; R1; 15	ADE; R2; Ret	SYM; R3; 14	SYM; R4; 19	HAM; R5; Ret	HAM; R6; 18	BAR; R7; Ret	BAR; R8; 24	BAR; R9; 22	PHI; R10; Ret	PHI; R11; 16	HID; R12; 21	HID; R13; Ret	TOW; R14; 13	TOW; R15; 23	QLD; R16; 18	QLD; R17; 19	SMP; R18; 19	SMP; R19; 16	SAN; QR; 11	SAN; R20; 26	BAT; R21; 10	SUR; R22; Ret	SUR; R23; Ret	YMC; R24; 9	YMC; R25; 13	YMC; R26; 6	WIN; R27; 5	WIN; R28; 17	SYD; R29; 8	SYD; R30; 22										21st	1354
2013	Jonny Reid	12	Ford	ADE; R1; Ret	ADE; R2; Ret	SYM; R3; 24	SYM; R4; 25	SYM; R5; 20	PUK; R6; 23	PUK; R7; 22	PUK; R8; 18	PUK; R9; 25																																37th	449
2013	Chaz Mostert	12	Ford	ADE; R1	ADE; R2	SYM; R3	SYM; R4	SYM; R5	PUK; R6	PUK; R7	PUK; R8	PUK; R9	BAR; R10; 15	BAR; R11; 15	BAR; R12; 10	COA; R13; 13	COA; R14; 19	COA; R15; 13	COA; R16; 15	HID; R17; 7	HID; R18; 17	HID; R19; 17	TOW; R20; 10	TOW; R21; 13	QLD; R22; 23	QLD; R23; 6	QLD; R24; 1	WIN; R25; 16	WIN; R26; 13	WIN; R27; 3	SAN; QR; 5	SAN; R28; 14	BAT; R29; 21	SUR; R30; 9	SUR; R31; 11	PHI; R32; 9	PHI; R33; 4	PHI; R34; Ret	SYD; R35; 21	SYD; R36; 9				17th	1520
2014	Scott Pye	16	Ford	ADE; R1; 10	ADE; R2; 20	ADE; R3; Ret	SYM; R4; 10	SYM; R5; 7	SYM; R6; 16	WIN; R7; 14	WIN; R8; 12	WIN; R9; 19	PUK; R10; 18	PUK; R11; 11	PUK; R12; 9	PUK; R13; 13	BAR; R14; 18	BAR; R15; 7	BAR; R16; 12	HID; R17; 15	HID; R18; 15	HID; R19; 14	TOW; R20; 12	TOW; R21; 12	TOW; R22; 8	QLD; R23; 16	QLD; R24; 12	QLD; R25; 4	SMP; R26; 20	SMP; R27; 21	SMP; R28; Ret	SAN; QR; 19	SAN; R29; 5	BAT; R30; Ret	SUR; R31; DSQ	SUR; R32; DSQ	PHI; R33; DSQ	PHI; R34; DSQ	PHI; R35; DSQ	SYD; R36; Ret	SYD; R37; 9	SYD; R38; 21		19th	1407
2016	Fabian Coulthard	12	Ford	ADE; R1; 10	ADE; R2; 14	ADE; R3; 16	SYM; R4; 18	SYM; R5; 8	PHI; R6; 3	PHI; R7; Ret	BAR; R8; 17	BAR; R9; 15	WIN; R10; 17	WIN; R11; 3	HID; R12; 6	HID; R13; Ret	TOW; R14; 8	TOW; R15; 15	QLD; R16; 10	QLD; R17; 10	SMP; R18; 10	SMP; R19; 4	SAN; QR; 11	SAN; R20; 6	BAT; R21; 6	SUR; R22; Ret	SUR; R23; 15	PUK; R24; 11	PUK; R25; 4	PUK; R26; 5	PUK; R27; 8	SYD; R28; 11	SYD; R29; 21											12th	2078
2017	Fabian Coulthard	12	Ford	ADE; R1; 2	ADE; R2; 5	SYM; R3; 11	SYM; R4; 1	PHI; R5; 1	PHI; R6; 17	BAR; R7; 2	BAR; R8; 7	WIN; R9; 3	WIN; R10; 3	HID; R11; 1	HID; R12; 4	TOW; R13; 10	TOW; R14; 21	QLD; R15; 6	QLD; R16; 5	SMP; R17; 1	SMP; R18; 2	SAN; QR; 6	SAN; R19; 5	BAT; R20; 3	SUR; R21; 19	SUR; R22; 9	PUK; R23; Ret	PUK; R24; 5	NEW; R25; 2	NEW; R26; Ret														3rd	2812
2018	Fabian Coulthard	12	Ford	ADE; R1; 21	ADE; R2; 16	MEL; R3; 3	MEL; R4; 3	MEL; R5; 12	MEL; R6; 6	SYM; R7; 5	SYM; R8; 17	PHI; R9; 12	PHI; R10; 4	BAR; R11; 8	BAR; R12; 16	WIN; R13; 4	WIN; R14; 1	HID; R15; 15	HID; R16; 8	TOW; R17; 5	TOW; R18; 8	QLD; R19; 5	QLD; R20; 5	SMP; R21; 11	BEN; R22; 14	BEN; R23; 14	SAN; QR; 4	SAN; R24; 7	BAT; R25; 9	SUR; R26; 11	SUR; R27; C	PUK; R28; Ret	PUK; R29; 7	NEW; R30; Ret	NEW; R31; 26									9th	2477
2019	Fabian Coulthard	12	Ford	ADE; R1; 6	ADE; R2; 20	MEL; R3; 2	MEL; R4; 5	MEL; R5; 5	MEL; R6; 15	SYM; R7; 2	SYM; R8; 2	PHI; R9; 2	PHI; R10; 1	BAR; R11; 1	BAR; R12; 4	WIN; R13; 15	WIN; R14; 2	HID; R15; 7	HID; R16; 3	TOW; R17; 5	TOW; R18; 2	QLD; R19; 10	QLD; R20; 18	BEN; R21; 12	BEN; R22; 10	PUK; R23; 7	PUK; R24; 12	BAT; R25; 21	SUR; R26; 9	SUR; R27; 11	SAN; QR; 6	SAN; R28; 4	NEW; R29; 3	NEW; R30; 2										4th	3058
2020	Fabian Coulthard	12	Ford	ADE; R1; 10	ADE; R2; 9	MEL; R3; C	MEL; R4; C	MEL; R5; C	MEL; R6; C	SMP1; R7; 10	SMP1; R8; 15	SMP1; R9; Ret	SMP2; R10; 7	SMP2; R11; 2	SMP2; R12; 13	HID1; R13; 6	HID1; R14; 3	HID1; R15; 5	HID2; R16; 10	HID2; R17; 4	HID2; R18; 11	TOW1; R19; 4	TOW1; R20; 15	TOW1; R21; 17	TOW2; R22; 7	TOW2; R23; 20	TOW2; R24; 8	BEN1; R25; 1	BEN1; R26; 4	BEN1; R27; 2	BEN2; R28; 9	BEN2; R29; Ret	BEN2; R30; 8	BAT; R31; 4										6th	1800
2021	Anton De Pasquale	11	Ford	BAT; R1; Ret	BAT; R2; 4	SAN; R3; 5	SAN; R4; Ret	SAN; R5; 12	SYM; R6; 3	SYM; R7; 13	SYM; R8; 2	BEN; R9; 3	BEN; R10; 1	BEN; R11; Ret	HID; R12; Ret	HID; R13; 6	HID; R14; 12	TOW; R15; 3	TOW; R16; 3	TOW; R17; 8	TOW; R18; 5	TOW2; R19; 2	SYD1; R20; 1	SYD1; R21; DSQ	SYD1; R22; 1	SYD2; R23; 12	SYD2; R24; 1	SYD2; R25; 2	SYD3; R26; 1	SYD3; R27; 1	SYD3; R28; 9	SYD4; R29; 4	SYD4; R30; C	BAT; R31; Ret										6th	2075
2022	Anton De Pasquale	11	Ford	SMP; R1; 2	SMP; R2; 3	SYM; R3; 6	SYM; R4; 5	SYM; R5; 3	MEL; R6; 23	MEL; R7; 20	MEL; R8; 4	MEL; R9; 3	BAR; R10; 2	BAR; R11; 2	BAR; R12; 4	WIN; R13; 8	WIN; R14; 10	WIN; R15; 8	HID; R16; 1	HID; R17; 4	HID; R18; 2	TOW; R19; 6	TOW; R20; 2	BEN; R21; 9	BEN; R22; 5	BEN; R23; 7	SAN; R24; 3	SAN; R25; 8	SAN; R26; 24	PUK; R27; 6	PUK; R28; Ret	PUK; R29; 5	BAT; R30; 7	SUR; R31; 6	SUR; R32; DSQ	ADE; R33; 14	ADE; R34; 3							4th	2599

=== Car No. 17 results ===
Year	Driver	No.	Make	1	2	3	4	5	6	7	8	9	10	11	12	13	14	15	16	17	18	19	20	21	22	23	24	25	26	27	28	29	30	31	32	33	34	35	36	37	38	39	40	Position	Pts
1990	Dick Johnson	17	Ford	AMA; R1; 3	SYM; R2; 1	PHI; R3; 1	WIN; R4; 5	LAK; R5; 7	MAL; R6; 2	BAR; R7; Ret	ORA; R8; 7																																	3rd	83
1991	Dick Johnson	17	Ford	SAN; R1; 4	SYM; R2; 5	BAR; R3; Ret	LAK; R4; 9	WIN; R5; 11	AMA; R6; 7	MAL; R7; 8	LAK; R8; Ret	ORA; R9; 11																																9th	27
1992	Dick Johnson	17	Ford	AMA; R1; 5	AMA; R2; 12	SAN; R3; 2	SAN; R4; 15	SYM; R5; 2	SYM; R6; 10	WIN; R7; 8	WIN; R8; 13	LAK; R9; Ret	LAK; R10; 6	EAS; R11; 11	EAS; R12; 15	MAL; R13; 8	MAL; R14; 9	BAR; R15; 2	BAR; R16; 10	ORA; R17; 9	ORA; R18; 10																							8th	134
1993	Dick Johnson	17	Ford	AMA; R1; 1	AMA; R2; Ret	SYM; R3; 4	SYM; R4; 4	PHI; R5; 3	PHI; R6; 4	LAK; R7; 1	LAK; R8; 2	WIN; R9; 7	WIN; R10; 6	EAS; R11; DNS	EAS; R12; 12	MAL; R13; 4	MAL; R14; 14	BAR; R15; 10	BAR; R16; 8	ORA; R17; 12	ORA; R18; 9																							5th	93
1994	Dick Johnson	17	Ford	AMA; R1; 4	AMA; R2; 8	SAN; R3; 19	SAN; R4; 10	SYM; R5; 9	SYM; R6; 10	PHI; R7; 6	PHI; R8; 6	LAK; R9; 1	LAK; R10; Ret	WIN; R11; 12	WIN; R12; 13	EAS; R13; 6	EAS; R14; 7	MAL; R15; Ret	MAL; R16; 5	BAR; R17; 4	BAR; R18; Ret	ORA; R19; 3	ORA; R20; 5																					8th	117
1995	Dick Johnson	17	Ford	SAN; R1; 7	SAN; R2; 4	SYM; R3; Ret	SYM; R4; 14	BAT; R5; 1	BAT; R6; 9	PHI; R7; 13	PHI; R8; 5	LAK; R9; 4	LAK; R10; 12	WIN; R11; 6	WIN; R12; 11	EAS; R13; 11	EAS; R14; 9	MAL; R15; 4	MAL; R16; 4	BAR; R17; 6	BAR; R18; 9	ORA; R19; 3	ORA; R20; Ret																					7th	136
1996	Dick Johnson	17	Ford	EAS; R1; Ret	EAS; R2; 5	EAS; R3; 4	SAN; R4; 8	SAN; R5; 7	SAN; R6; Ret	BAT; R7; 6	BAT; R8; 2	BAT; R9; 2	SYM; R10; Ret	SYM; R11; 10	SYM; R12; 7	PHI; R13; Ret	PHI; R14; 3	PHI; R15; 3	CAL; R16; 4	CAL; R17; 12	CAL; R18; 10	LAK; R19; 3	LAK; R20; 9	LAK; R21; 4	BAR; R22; Ret	BAR; R23; 12	BAR; R24; Ret	MAL; R25; 8	MAL; R26; 9	MAL; R27; 4	ORA; R28; 10	ORA; R29; 14	ORA; R30; 7											10th	173
1997	Dick Johnson	17	Ford	CAL; R1; 13	CAL; R2; 14	CAL; R3; 11	PHI; R4; 7	PHI; R5; 7	PHI; R6; 6	SAN; R7; 9	SAN; R8; 5	SAN; R9; 9	SYM; R10; Ret	SYM; R11; 10	SYM; R12; 9	WIN; R13; 11	WIN; R14; 7	WIN; R15; 7	EAS; R16; 2	EAS; R17; 4	EAS; R18; 3	LAK; R19; 3	LAK; R20; 2	LAK; R21; 6	BAR; R22; 16	BAR; R23; DNS	BAR; R24; 16	MAL; R25; 6	MAL; R26; 7	MAL; R27; 7	ORA; R28; 10	ORA; R29; Ret	ORA; R30; 7											7th	384
1998	Dick Johnson	17	Ford	SAN; R1; 15	SAN; R2; 9	SAN; R3; 6	SYM; R4; 6	SYM; R5; 10	SYM; R6; 9	LAK; R7; 2	LAK; R8; 2	LAK; R9; 2	PHI; R10; Ret	PHI; R11; 14	PHI; R12; 13	WIN; R13; 10	WIN; R14; 7	WIN; R15; 5	MAL; R16; 5	MAL; R17; 2	MAL; R18; Ret	BAR; R19; 4	BAR; R20; 5	BAR; R21; 13	CAL; R22; 17	CAL; R23; Ret	CAL; R24; C	HDV; R25; 15	HDV; R26; 7	HDV; R27; 12	ORA; R28; 24	ORA; R29; 18	ORA; R30; 17											10th	550
1999	Dick Johnson	17	Ford	EAS; R1; 16	EAS; R2; 24	EAS; R3; 14	ADE; R4; 10	BAR; R5; 14	BAR; R6; 9	BAR; R7; 29	PHI; R8; 11	PHI; R9; 11	PHI; R10; 10	HDV; R11; 9	HDV; R12; 13	HDV; R13; 13	SAN; R14; 12	SAN; R15; 9	SAN; R16; 8	QLD; R17; Ret	QLD; R18; 14	QLD; R19; Ret	CAL; R20	CAL; R21	CAL; R22	SYM; R23; Ret	SYM; R24; 16	SYM; R25; 9	WIN; R26; 11	WIN; R27; 10	WIN; R28; 10	ORA; R29; 12	ORA; R30; 12	ORA; R31; Ret	QLD; R32; 7	BAT; R33; 4								10th	1160
1999	Steven Johnson	17	Ford	EAS; R1	EAS; R2	EAS; R3	ADE; R4	BAR; R5	BAR; R6	BAR; R7	PHI; R8	PHI; R9	PHI; R10	HDV; R11	HDV; R12	HDV; R13	SAN; R14	SAN; R15	SAN; R16	QLD; R17	QLD; R18	QLD; R19	CAL; R20; 10	CAL; R21; 6	CAL; R22; 5	SYM; R23	SYM; R24	SYM; R25	WIN; R26	WIN; R27	WIN; R28	ORA; R29	ORA; R30	ORA; R31	QLD; R32	BAT; R33								23rd	576
2000	Steven Johnson	17	Ford	PHI; R1; 16	PHI; R2; 12	BAR; R3; 9	BAR; R4; 8	BAR; R5; 9	ADE; R6; 6	ADE; R7; 8	EAS; R8; 19	EAS; R9; 16	EAS; R10; 28	HDV; R11; 13	HDV; R12; 13	HDV; R13; 11	CAN; R14; 21	CAN; R15; 3	CAN; R16; 12	QLD; R17; 10	QLD; R18; 12	QLD; R19; 8	WIN; R20; 14	WIN; R21; 12	WIN; R22; 6	ORA; R23; Ret	ORA; R24; 14	ORA; R25; 11	CAL; R26; 15	CAL; R27; 14	CAL; R28; Ret	QLD; R29; Ret	SAN; R30; 11	SAN; R31; 24	SAN; R32; 13	BAT; R33; 4								11th	831
2001	Steven Johnson	17	Ford	PHI; R1; 7	PHI; R2; 9	ADE; R3; 2	ADE; R4; 3	EAS; R5; 15	EAS; R6; 15	HDV; R7; 21	HDV; R8; 26	HDV; R9; 16	CAN; R10; 1	CAN; R11; 12	CAN; R12; 3	BAR; R13; 9	BAR; R14; 5	BAR; R15; 4	CAL; R16; 1	CAL; R17; 6	CAL; R18; 4	ORA; R19; 5	ORA; R20; 4	QLD; R21; 1	WIN; R22; 8	WIN; R23; 9	BAT; R24; Ret	PUK; R25; 9	PUK; R26; 6	PUK; R27; 6	SAN; R28; 12	SAN; R29; Ret	SAN; R30; 13											5th	2532
2002	Steven Johnson	17	Ford	ADE; R1; 8	ADE; R2; 10	PHI; R3; 8	PHI; R4; 10	EAS; R5; 15	EAS; R6; 8	EAS; R7; 24	HDV; R8; 14	HDV; R9; Ret	HDV; R10; 12	CAN; R11; 10	CAN; R12; 14	CAN; R13; 6	BAR; R14 ?	BAR; R15; 23	BAR; R16 ?	ORA; R17 ?	ORA; R18 ?	WIN; R19 ?	WIN; R20 ?	QLD; R21; 13	BAT; R22; Ret	SUR; R23 ?	SUR; R24 ?	PUK; R25 ?	PUK; R26 ?	PUK; R27 ?	SAN; R28 ?	SAN; R29 ?												14th	626
2013	Tim Blanchard	17	Ford	ADE; R1; 18	ADE; R2; 15	SYM; R3; 17	SYM; R4; 26	SYM; R5; 22	PUK; R6; 15	PUK; R7; 23	PUK; R8; Ret	PUK; R9; 20	BAR; R10; 21	BAR; R11; 20	BAR; R12; 23	COA; R13; 19	COA; R14; 24	COA; R15; 26	COA; R16; 23	HID; R17; Ret	HID; R18; 24	HID; R19; 15	TOW; R20; 23	TOW; R21; 23	QLD; R22; 16	QLD; R23; 19	QLD; R24; Ret	WIN; R25; 27	WIN; R26; 21	WIN; R27; 9	SAN; Q 22	SAN; R28; Ret	BAT; R29; 15	SUR; R30; 19	SUR; R31; 16	PHI; R32; 6	PHI; R33; 12	PHI; R34; 16	SYD; R35; Ret	SYD; R36; Ret				26th	1080
2014	David Wall	17	Ford	ADE; R1; 14	ADE; R2; Ret	ADE; R3; 8	SYM; R4; 12	SYM; R5; 20	SYM; R6; 13	WIN; R7; 13	WIN; R8; 5	WIN; R9; 22	PUK; R10; Ret	PUK; R11; DNS	PUK; R12; DNS	PUK; R13; DNS	BAR; R14; 14	BAR; R15; 13	BAR; R16; 7	HID; R17; 18	HID; R18; 16	HID; R19; 18	TOW; R20; 16	TOW; R21; 13	TOW; R22; 20	QLD; R23; 19	QLD; R24; 20	QLD; R25; 12	SMP; R26; 18	SMP; R27; 14	SMP; R28; 12	SAN; QR; 23	SAN; R29; 16	BAT; R30; Ret	SUR; R31; 16	SUR; R32; 15	PHI; R33; 17	PHI; R34; 19	PHI; R35; Ret	SYD; R36; 7	SYD; R37; Ret	SYD; R38; 22		21st	1349
2015	Marcos Ambrose	17	Ford	ADE; R1; 16	ADE; R2; 16	ADE; R3; 12	SYM; R4	SYM; R5	SYM; R6	BAR; R7	BAR; R8	BAR; R9	WIN; R10	WIN; R11	WIN; R12	HID; R13	HID; R14	HID; R15	TOW; R16	TOW; R17	QLD; R18	QLD; R19	QLD; R20	SMP; R21	SMP; R22	SMP; R23	SAN; R24	BAT; R25	SUR; R26	SUR; R27	PUK; R28	PUK; R29	PUK; R30	PHI; R31	PHI; R32	PHI; R33	SYD; R34	SYD; R35	SYD; R36					43rd	395
2015	Scott Pye	17	Ford	ADE; R1	ADE; R2	ADE; R3	SYM; R4; 18	SYM; R5; 17	SYM; R6; 18	BAR; R7; 22	BAR; R8; 21	BAR; R9; Ret	WIN; R10; 15	WIN; R11; 18	WIN; R12; 8	HID; R13; 6	HID; R14; 4	HID; R15; 16	TOW; R16; 5	TOW; R17; 19	QLD; R18; Ret	QLD; R19; 10	QLD; R20; 15	SMP; R21; 9	SMP; R22; 22	SMP; R23; 17	SAN; QR; 11	SAN; R24; 12	BAT; R25; Ret	SUR; R26; 8	SUR; R27; 21	PUK; R28; 5	PUK; R29; 8	PUK; R30; 3	PHI; R31; 13	PHI; R32; 6	PHI; R33; 14	SYD; R34; 16	SYD; R35; 9	SYD; R36; 9				19th	1589
2016	Scott Pye	17	Ford	ADE; R1; 12	ADE; R2; 7	ADE; R3; 17	SYM; R4; 14	SYM; R5; 14	PHI; R6; 26	PHI; R7; 3	BAR; R8; 24	BAR; R9; 19	WIN; R10; 12	WIN; R11; 7	HID; R12; 5	HID; R13; Ret	TOW; R14; 18	TOW; R15; 7	QLD; R16; 20	QLD; R17; 24	SMP; R18; Ret	SMP; R19; 15	SAN; QR; 21	SAN; R20; 15	BAT; R21; 5	SUR; R22; 18	SUR; R23; 23	PUK; R24; 9	PUK; R25; 11	PUK; R26; 2	PUK; R27; 9	SYD; R28; 14	SYD; R29; 13											15th	1807
2017	Scott McLaughlin	17	Ford	ADE; R1; 17	ADE; R2; 2	SYM; R3; 14	SYM; R4; 2	PHI; R5; 10	PHI; R6; 14	BAR; R7; 1	BAR; R8; 1	WIN; R9; 1	WIN; R10; 5	HID; R11; 2	HID; R12; 1	TOW; R13; 1	TOW; R14; 2	QLD; R15; 1	QLD; R16; 2	SMP; R17; 21	SMP; R18; 4	SAN; Q 2	SAN; R19; 2	BAT; R20; Ret	SUR; R21; 12	SUR; R22; 1	PUK; R23; 3	PUK; R24; 2	NEW; R25; 1	NEW; R26; 18														2nd	3021
2018	Scott McLaughlin	17	Ford	ADE; R1; 3	ADE; R2; 10	MEL; R3; 1	MEL; R4; 2	MEL; R5; 15	MEL; R6; 7	SYM; R7; 9	SYM; R8; 2	PHI; R9; 1	PHI; R10; 1	BAR; R11; 1	BAR; R12; 1	WIN; R13; 5	WIN; R14; 3	HID; R15; 1	HID; R16; 2	TOW; R17; 3	TOW; R18; 3	QLD; R19; 1	QLD; R20; 2	SMP; R21; 3	BEN; R22; 6	BEN; R23; 10	SAN; QR; 3	SAN; R24; 4	BAT; R25; 3	SUR; R26; 5	SUR; R27; C	PUK; R28; 2	PUK; R29; 1	NEW; R30; 1	NEW; R31; 2									1st	3944
2019	Scott McLaughlin	17	Ford	ADE; R1; 1	ADE; R2; 1	MEL; R3; 1	MEL; R4; 1	MEL; R5; DNS	MEL; R6; 1	SYM; R7; 1	SYM; R8; 4	PHI; R9; 1	PHI; R10; 2	BAR; R11; 2	BAR; R12; 1	WIN; R13; 1	WIN; R14; 1	HID; R15; 1	HID; R16; 1	TOW; R17; 1	TOW; R18; 11	QLD; R19; 4	QLD; R20; 1	BEN; R21; 1	BEN; R22; 1	PUK; R23; 4	PUK; R24; 1	BAT; R25; 1	SUR; R26; 3	SUR; R27; DNS	SAN; QR; 5	SAN; R28; 9	NEW; R29; 2	NEW; R30; 4										1st	3872
2020	Scott McLaughlin	17	Ford	ADE; R1; 2	ADE; R2; 1	MEL; R3; C	MEL; R4; C	MEL; R5; C	MEL; R6; C	SMP1; R7; 1	SMP1; R8; 3	SMP1; R9; 1	SMP2; R10; 1	SMP2; R11; 3	SMP2; R12; 14	HID1; R13; 20	HID1; R14; 1	HID1; R15; 2	HID2; R16; 1	HID2; R17; 1	HID2; R18; 1	TOW1; R19; 7	TOW1; R20; 6	TOW1; R21; 1	TOW2; R22; 1	TOW2; R23; 2	TOW2; R24; 3	BEN1; R25; 14	BEN1; R26; 3	BEN1; R27; 1	BEN2; R28; 1	BEN2; R29; 1	BEN2; R30; 2	BAT; R31; 5										1st	2576
2021	Will Davison	17	Ford	BAT; R1; 3	BAT; R2; 7	SAN; R3; 22	SAN; R4; 10	SAN; R5; 5	SYM; R6; 5	SYM; R7; 3	SYM; R8; 3	BEN; R9; 8	BEN; R10; 2	BEN; R11; 3	HID; R12; 14	HID; R13; 2	HID; R14; 2	TOW1; R15; 9	TOW1; R16; 4	TOW2; R17; 11	TOW2; R18; 4	TOW2; R19; 3	SYD1; R20; 7	SYD1; R21; 2	SYD1; R22; 5	SYD2; R23; 3	SYD2; R24; 4	SYD2; R25; 7	SYD3; R26; 7	SYD3; R27; 5	SYD3; R28; 12	SYD4; R29; 5	SYD4; R30; C	BAT; R31; 10										4th	2389
2022	Will Davison	17	Ford	SMP; R1; 4	SMP; R2; 7	SYM; R3; 2	SYM; R4; 16	SYM; R5; 2	MEL; R6; 16	MEL; R7; 24	MEL; R8; 2	MEL; R9; 2	BAR; R10; 6	BAR; R11; 1	BAR; R12; 3	WIN; R13; 11	WIN; R14; 14	WIN; R15; 10	HID; R16; 2	HID; R17; 2	HID; R18; 4	TOW; R19; 2	TOW; R20; 7	BEN; R21; 2	BEN; R22; 13	BEN; R23; 4	SAN; R24; 1	SAN; R25; 15	SAN; R26; 2	PUK; R27; 1	PUK; R28; 4	PUK; R29; 22	BAT; R30; Ret	SUR; R31; 4	SUR; R32; 3	ADE; R33; 7	ADE; R34; 19							5th	2573

== Super2 drivers ==
The following is a list of drivers who have driven for the team in the Super2, in order of their first appearance. Drivers who drove for the team on a part-time basis are listed in italics

- (Australia) Tony Ricciardello (2003)
- (Australia) Warren Luff (2003)
- (Australia) Owen Kelly (2004)
- (Australia) Jose Fernandez (2004)
- (Australia) Dean Canto (2005)
- (Australia) Grant Denyer (2005–2006, 2009)
- (Australia) Will Davison (2005)
- (Australia) Marcus La Delle (2006)
- (Australia) Andrew Thompson (2006)
- (Australia) Luke Youlden (2006)
