= 2002 V8 Supercars Eastern Creek round =

Motor race

(New South Wales) 2002 Eastern Creek V8 Supercar round
Event Information
- Round 3 of 13 in the 2002 V8 Supercar Championship Series
- Date: 26-28 April 2002
- Location: Eastern Creek, New South Wales
- Venue: Eastern Creek Raceway
- Weather: Fine

Results
Race 1
Distance	13 laps	52 km
Pole position	Mark Skaife; Holden Racing Team	1:31.3824
Winner	Mark Skaife; Holden Racing Team	20:12.5059
Race 2
Distance	39 laps	156 km
Winner	Mark Skaife; Holden Racing Team	01:01:53.0093
Race 3
Distance	39 laps	156 km
Winner	Mark Skaife; Holden Racing Team	01:01:55.1475
Round Results
First	Mark Skaife; Holden Racing Team	240 pts
Second	Marcos Ambrose; Stone Brothers Racing	170 pts
Third	Craig Lowndes; 00 Motorsport	139 pts

The 2002 Eastern Creek V8 Supercar round was the third round of the 2002 V8 Supercar Championship Series. It was held on the weekend of 26 to 28 April at the Eastern Creek Raceway, New South Wales Australia.

The round was dominated by Mark Skaife, who took pole position and won every race of the weekend. These results helped further cement his lead in the championship. Marcos Ambrose was second for the round whilst the podium was rounded out by Craig Lowndes.

== Race results ==
=== Pre-qualifying ===
In a tense pre-qualifying session, several key drivers failed to qualify for the event. Paul Morris and Steve Owen collided, resulting in a puncture for the former toward the end of the session. He was unable to improve on his time and thus became one of the casualties. It was also said to be the first time Wayne Gardner failed to qualify for a motor race. Despite rule changes introduced the round prior in an attempt to aid those who had to undertake pre-qualifying, the system was still universally unpopular with the teams and drivers.

Pos	No	Name	Team	Vehicle	Time
1	21	(Australia) Brad Jones	Brad Jones Racing	Ford Falcon (AU)	1:33.0200
2	5	(Australia) Glenn Seton	Glenn Seton Racing	Ford Falcon (AU)	1:33.2849
3	27	(Australia) Neil Crompton	00 Motorsport	Ford Falcon (AU)	1:33.4170
4	71	(Australia) Greg Ritter	Dick Johnson Racing	Ford Falcon (AU)	1:33.5169
5	3	(Australia) Cameron McConville	Lansvale Racing Team	Holden Commodore (VX)	1:33.5503
6	10	(Australia) Mark Larkham	Larkham Motor Sport	Ford Falcon (AU)	1:33.5718
7	40	(Australia) Cameron McLean	Paragon Motorsport	Ford Falcon (AU)	1:33.5740
Did not qualify
8	24	(Australia) Paul Romano	Romano Racing	Holden Commodore (VX)	1:33.6100
9	36	(Australia) Wayne Gardner	Stone Brothers Racing	Ford Falcon (AU)	1:33.7429
10	29	(Australia) Paul Morris	Paul Morris Motorsport	Holden Commodore (VX)	1:33.8544
11	75	(Australia) Anthony Tratt	Paul Little Racing	Ford Falcon (AU)	1:34.1156
12	22	(Australia) Dugal McDougall	McDougall Motorsport	Holden Commodore (VX)	1:35.0030
13	14	(Australia) Steve Owen	Imrie Motor Sport	Holden Commodore (VX)	1:35.1333

=== Qualifying ===
Friday afternoon's qualifying session provided a few surprises. Brazilian Max Wilson clocked the second-fastest time in just his third weekend in the category. Series veteran John Faulkner stunned the paddock by qualifying in fourth place after years of struggling with budget and equipment. Lowndes qualified outside the top 10 whilst the Dick Johnson Racing Falcon's struggled, with their inexplicable lack of pace leaving them in the mid-pack as they attempted to find a solution. Skaife meanwhile set the benchmark, with a time nearly half a second faster than the rest of the pack, to take provisional pole position.

Pos	No	Name	Team	Vehicle	Time
1	1	(Australia) Mark Skaife	Holden Racing Team	Holden Commodore (VX)	1:31.8873
2	65	(Brazil) Max Wilson	Briggs Motor Sport	Ford Falcon (AU)	1:32.3208
3	34	(Australia) Garth Tander	Garry Rogers Motorsport	Holden Commodore (VX)	1:32.3955
4	46	(New Zealand) John Faulkner	John Faulkner Racing	Holden Commodore (VT)	1:32.4509
5	31	(Australia) Steven Ellery	Steven Ellery Racing	Ford Falcon (AU)	1:32.4681
6	51	(New Zealand) Greg Murphy	Kmart Racing Team	Holden Commodore (VX)	1:32.4739
7	4	(Australia) Marcos Ambrose	Stone Brothers Racing	Ford Falcon (AU)	1:32.4802
8	8	(Australia) Russell Ingall	Perkins Engineering	Holden Commodore (VX)	1:32.4995
9	16	(New Zealand) Steven Richards	Perkins Engineering	Holden Commodore (VX)	1:32.6782
10	9	(Australia) David Besnard	Stone Brothers Racing	Ford Falcon (AU)	1:32.7186
11	2	(Australia) Jason Bright	Holden Racing Team	Holden Commodore (VX)	1:32.7706
12	15	(Australia) Todd Kelly	Kmart Racing Team	Holden Commodore (VX)	1:32.8048
13	00	(Australia) Craig Lowndes	00 Motorsport	Ford Falcon (AU)	1:32.8511
14	888	(Australia) John Bowe	Brad Jones Racing	Ford Falcon (AU)	1:32.8647
15	02	(Australia) Rick Kelly	Holden Racing Team	Holden Commodore (VX)	1:32.8716
16	18	(New Zealand) Paul Radisich	Dick Johnson Racing	Ford Falcon (AU)	1:32.9025
17	17	(Australia) Steven Johnson	Dick Johnson Racing	Ford Falcon (AU)	1:32.9815
18	5	(Australia) Glenn Seton	Glenn Seton Racing	Ford Falcon (AU)	1:33.0320
19	71	(Australia) Greg Ritter	Dick Johnson Racing	Ford Falcon (AU)	1:33.0703
20	27	(Australia) Neil Crompton	00 Motorsport	Ford Falcon (AU)	1:33.1175
21	40	(Australia) Cameron McLean	Paragon Motorsport	Ford Falcon (AU)	1:33.1346
22	021	(New Zealand) Jason Richards	Team Kiwi Racing	Holden Commodore (VT)	1:33.1425
23	66	(Australia) Tony Longhurst	Briggs Motor Sport	Ford Falcon (AU)	1:33.1488
24	11	(Australia) Larry Perkins	Perkins Engineering	Holden Commodore (VX)	1:33.1661
25	3	(Australia) Cameron McConville	Lansvale Racing Team	Holden Commodore (VX)	1:33.2054
26	21	(Australia) Brad Jones	Brad Jones Racing	Ford Falcon (AU)	1:33.2267
27	43	(Australia) Paul Weel	Paul Weel Racing	Ford Falcon (AU)	1:33.2354
28	35	(Australia) Jason Bargwanna	Garry Rogers Motorsport	Holden Commodore (VX)	1:33.2659
29	600	(New Zealand) Simon Wills	Briggs Motor Sport	Ford Falcon (AU)	1:33.3197
30	54	(New Zealand) Craig Baird	Rod Nash Racing	Holden Commodore (VX)	1:33.2054
31	10	(Australia) Mark Larkham	Larkham Motor Sport	Ford Falcon (AU)	1:33.9715
32	7	(Australia) Rodney Forbes	00 Motorsport	Ford Falcon (AU)	1:34.3204

=== Top Ten Shootout ===
Pos	No	Name	Team	Vehicle	Time
1	1	(Australia) Mark Skaife	Holden Racing Team	Holden Commodore (VX)	1:31.3824
2	4	(Australia) Marcos Ambrose	Stone Brothers Racing	Ford Falcon (AU)	1:32.0264
3	46	(New Zealand) John Faulkner	John Faulkner Racing	Holden Commodore (VT)	1:32.3034
4	31	(Australia) Steven Ellery	Steven Ellery Racing	Ford Falcon (AU)	1:32.3773
5	51	(New Zealand) Greg Murphy	Kmart Racing Team	Holden Commodore (VX)	1:32.5073
6	34	(Australia) Garth Tander	Garry Rogers Motorsport	Holden Commodore (VX)	1:32.5614
7	8	(Australia) Russell Ingall	Perkins Engineering	Holden Commodore (VX)	1:32.6291
8	65	(Brazil) Max Wilson	Briggs Motor Sport	Ford Falcon (AU)	1:32.7077
9	9	(Australia) David Besnard	Stone Brothers Racing	Ford Falcon (AU)	1:32.7970
10	16	(New Zealand) Steven Richards	Perkins Engineering	Holden Commodore (VX)	1:32.8942

=== Race 1 ===
Pos	No	Name	Team	Vehicle	Laps	Time / Retired	Grid
1	1	(Australia) Mark Skaife	Holden Racing Team	Holden Commodore (VX)	13	20min 12.5059sec	1
2	4	(Australia) Marcos Ambrose	Stone Brothers Racing	Ford Falcon (AU)	13	+ 2.820 s	2
3	46	(New Zealand) John Faulkner	John Faulkner Racing	Holden Commodore (VT)	13	+ 11.393 s	3
4	51	(New Zealand) Greg Murphy	Kmart Racing Team	Holden Commodore (VX)	13	+ 13.565 s	5
5	8	(Australia) Russell Ingall	Perkins Engineering	Holden Commodore (VX)	13	+ 15.528 s	7
6	31	(Australia) Steven Ellery	Steven Ellery Racing	Ford Falcon (AU)	13	+ 20.147 s	4
7	9	(Australia) David Besnard	Stone Brothers Racing	Ford Falcon (AU)	13	+ 22.668 s	9
8	34	(Australia) Garth Tander	Garry Rogers Motorsport	Holden Commodore (VX)	13	+ 22.898 s	6
9	00	(Australia) Craig Lowndes	00 Motorsport	Ford Falcon (AU)	13	+ 23.314 s	13
10	16	(New Zealand) Steven Richards	Perkins Engineering	Holden Commodore (VX)	13	+ 24.168 s	10
11	15	(Australia) Todd Kelly	Kmart Racing Team	Holden Commodore (VX)	13	+ 24.664 s	12
12	888	(Australia) John Bowe	Brad Jones Racing	Ford Falcon (AU)	13	+ 25.322 s	14
13	02	(Australia) Rick Kelly	Holden Racing Team	Holden Commodore (VX)	13	+ 26.194 s	15
14	18	(Australia) Paul Radisich	Dick Johnson Racing	Ford Falcon (AU)	13	+ 26.949 s	16
15	17	(Australia) Steven Johnson	Dick Johnson Racing	Ford Falcon (AU)	13	+ 31.418 s	17
16	5	(Australia) Glenn Seton	Glenn Seton Racing	Ford Falcon (AU)	13	+ 32.198 s	18
17	021	(New Zealand) Jason Richards	Team Kiwi Racing	Holden Commodore (VT)	13	+ 32.739 s	22
18	27	(Australia) Neil Crompton	00 Motorsport	Ford Falcon (AU)	13	+ 33.623 s	20
19	71	(Australia) Greg Ritter	Dick Johnson Racing	Ford Falcon (AU)	13	+ 35.635 s	19
20	21	(Australia) Brad Jones	Brad Jones Racing	Ford Falcon (AU)	13	+ 36.320 s	26
21	65	(Brazil) Max Wilson	Briggs Motor Sport	Ford Falcon (AU)	13	+ 37.997 s	8
22	66	(Australia) Tony Longhurst	Briggs Motor Sport	Ford Falcon (AU)	13	+ 38.633 s	23
23	11	(Australia) Larry Perkins	Perkins Engineering	Holden Commodore (VX)	13	+ 38.930 s	24
24	35	(Australia) Jason Bargwanna	Garry Rogers Motorsport	Holden Commodore (VX)	13	+ 39.197 s	28
25	43	(Australia) Paul Weel	Paul Weel Racing	Ford Falcon (AU)	13	+ 39.613 s	27
26	54	(New Zealand) Craig Baird	Rod Nash Racing	Holden Commodore (VX)	13	+ 41.036 s	30
27	40	(Australia) Cameron McLean	Paragon Motorsport	Ford Falcon (AU)	13	+ 42.390 s	21
28	10	(Australia) Mark Larkham	Larkham Motor Sport	Ford Falcon (AU)	13	+ 42.868 s	31
29	7	(Australia) Rodney Forbes	00 Motorsport	Ford Falcon (AU)	13	+ 43.650 s	32
Ret	2	(Australia) Jason Bright	Holden Racing Team	Holden Commodore (VX)	8	Engine	11
Ret	600	(New Zealand) Simon Wills	Briggs Motor Sport	Ford Falcon (AU)	8	Retired	29
Ret	3	(Australia) Cameron McConville	Lansvale Racing Team	Holden Commodore (VX)	4	Retired	25

=== Race 2 ===
Pos	No	Name	Team	Vehicle	Laps	Time / Retired	Grid
1	1	(Australia) Mark Skaife	Holden Racing Team	Holden Commodore (VX)	39	1hr 1min 53.0093sec	1
2	4	(Australia) Marcos Ambrose	Stone Brothers Racing	Ford Falcon (AU)	39	+ 2.144 s	2
3	00	(Australia) Craig Lowndes	00 Motorsport	Ford Falcon (AU)	39	+ 27.157s	9
4	34	(Australia) Garth Tander	Garry Rogers Motorsport	Holden Commodore (VX)	39	+ 31.984 s	8
5	15	(Australia) Todd Kelly	Kmart Racing Team	Holden Commodore (VX)	39	+ 49.156 s	11
6	46	(New Zealand) John Faulkner	John Faulkner Racing	Holden Commodore (VX)	39	+ 51.706 s	3
7	51	(New Zealand) Greg Murphy	Kmart Racing Team	Holden Commodore (VX)	39	+ 57.211 s	4
8	17	(Australia) Steven Johnson	Dick Johnson Racing	Ford Falcon (AU)	39	+ 1:08.673 s	15
9	18	(New Zealand) Paul Radisich	Dick Johnson Racing	Ford Falcon (AU)	39	+ 1:09.122 s	14
10	888	(Australia) John Bowe	Brad Jones Racing	Ford Falcon (AU)	39	+ 1:09.467 s	12
11	16	(New Zealand) Steven Richards	Perkins Engineering	Holden Commodore (VX)	39	+ 1:10.317 s	10
12	27	(Australia) Neil Crompton	00 Motorsport	Ford Falcon (AU)	39	+ 1:12.583 s	18
13	2	(Australia) Jason Bright	Holden Racing Team	Holden Commodore (VX)	39	+ 1:12.732 s	30
14	3	(Australia) Cameron McConville	Lansvale Racing Team	Holden Commodore (VX)	39	+ 1:13.589 s	32
15	5	(Australia) Glenn Seton	Glenn Seton Racing	Ford Falcon (AU)	39	+ 1:14.493 s	16
16	10	(Australia) Mark Larkham	Larkham Motor Sport	Ford Falcon (AU)	39	+ 1:19.112 s	28
17	66	(Australia) Tony Longhurst	Briggs Motor Sport	Ford Falcon (AU)	39	+ 1:20.994 s	22
18	9	(Australia) David Besnard	Stone Brothers Racing	Ford Falcon (AU)	39	+ 1:22.099 s	7
19	600	(New Zealand) Simon Wills	Briggs Motor Sport	Ford Falcon (AU)	39	+ 1:24.775 s	31
20	54	(New Zealand) Craig Baird	Rod Nash Racing	Holden Commodore (VX)	39	+ 1:27.556 s	26
21	31	(Australia) Steven Ellery	Steven Ellery Racing	Ford Falcon (AU)	39	+ 1:28.857 s	6
22	02	(Australia) Rick Kelly	Holden Racing Team	Holden Commodore (VX)	39	+ 1:29.119 s	13
23	11	(Australia) Larry Perkins	Perkins Engineering	Holden Commodore (VX)	39	+ 1:32.342 s	23
24	21	(Australia) Brad Jones	Brad Jones Racing	Ford Falcon (AU)	39	+ 1:32.589 s	20
25	021	(New Zealand) Jason Richards	Team Kiwi Racing	Holden Commodore (VX)	39	+ 1:52.595 s	17
26	35	(Australia) Jason Bargwanna	Garry Rogers Motorsport	Holden Commodore (VX)	38	+ 1 lap	24
27	65	(Brazil) Max Wilson	Briggs Motor Sport	Ford Falcon (AU)	38	+ 1 lap	21
28	7	(Australia) Rodney Forbes	00 Motorsport	Ford Falcon (AU)	38	+ 1 lap	29
29	8	(Australia) Russell Ingall	Perkins Engineering	Holden Commodore (VX)	38	+ 1 lap	5
30	43	(Australia) Paul Weel	Paul Weel Racing	Ford Falcon (AU)	35	+ 4 laps	25
Ret	40	(Australia) Cameron McLean	Paragon Motorsport	Ford Falcon (AU)	29	Retired	27
Ret	71	(Australia) Greg Ritter	Dick Johnson Racing	Ford Falcon (AU)	21	Retired	19

=== Race 3 ===
Pos	No	Name	Team	Vehicle	Laps	Time / Retired	Grid
1	1	(Australia) Mark Skaife	Holden Racing Team	Holden Commodore (VX)	39	1hr 1min 55.1475sec	1
2	00	(Australia) Craig Lowndes	00 Motorsport	Ford Falcon (AU)	39	+ 4.280 s	3
2	34	(Australia) Garth Tander	Garry Rogers Motorsport	Holden Commodore (VX)	39	+ 8.771 s	4
4	4	(Australia) Marcos Ambrose	Stone Brothers Racing	Ford Falcon (AU)	39	+ 9.916 s	2
5	51	(New Zealand) Greg Murphy	Kmart Racing Team	Holden Commodore (VX)	39	+ 12.455 s	7
6	15	(Australia) Todd Kelly	Kmart Racing Team	Holden Commodore (VX)	39	+ 12.652 s	5
7	2	(Australia) Jason Bright	Holden Racing Team	Holden Commodore (VX)	39	+ 14.340 s	13
8	888	(Australia) John Bowe	Brad Jones Racing	Ford Falcon (AU)	39	+ 50.713 s	10
9	18	(New Zealand) Paul Radisich	Dick Johnson Racing	Ford Falcon (AU)	39	+ 54.055 s	9
10	3	(Australia) Cameron McConville	Lansvale Racing Team	Holden Commodore (VX)	39	+ 1:06.005 s	14
11	71	(Australia) Greg Ritter	Dick Johnson Racing	Ford Falcon (AU)	39	+ 1:08.704 s	32
12	16	(New Zealand) Steven Richards	Perkins Engineering	Holden Commodore (VX)	39	+ 1:09.062 s	11
13	35	(Australia) Jason Bargwanna	Garry Rogers Motorsport	Holden Commodore (VX)	39	+ 1:09.327 s	26
14	27	(Australia) Neil Crompton	00 Motorsport	Ford Falcon (AU)	39	+ 1:10.149 s	12
15	9	(Australia) David Besnard	Stone Brothers Racing	Ford Falcon (AU)	39	+ 1:11.469 s	18
16	66	(Australia) Tony Longhurst	Briggs Motor Sport	Ford Falcon (AU)	39	+ 1:11.947 s	17
17	21	(Australia) Brad Jones	Brad Jones Racing	Ford Falcon (AU)	39	+ 1:12.209 s	24
18	021	(New Zealand) Jason Richards	Team Kiwi Racing	Holden Commodore (VX)	39	+ 1:13.341 s	25
19	65	(Brazil) Max Wilson	Briggs Motor Sport	Ford Falcon (AU)	39	+ 1:13.670 s	27
20	11	(Australia) Larry Perkins	Perkins Engineering	Holden Commodore (VX)	39	+ 1:14.472 s	23
21	600	(New Zealand) Simon Wills	Briggs Motor Sport	Ford Falcon (AU)	39	+ 1:21.053 s	19
22	40	(Australia) Cameron McLean	Paragon Motorsport	Ford Falcon (AU)	39	+ 1:40.677 s	31
23	10	(Australia) Mark Larkham	Larkham Motor Sport	Ford Falcon (AU)	39	+ 1:41.187 s	16
24	17	(Australia) Steven Johnson	Dick Johnson Racing	Ford Falcon (AU)	39	+ 1:46.379 s	8
25	02	(Australia) Rick Kelly	Holden Racing Team	Holden Commodore (VX)	39	+ 1:55.280 s	22
26	43	(Australia) Paul Weel	Paul Weel Racing	Ford Falcon (AU)	38	+ 1 lap	30
27	8	(Australia) Russell Ingall	Perkins Engineering	Holden Commodore (VX)	31	+ 8 laps	29
28	7	(Australia) Rodney Forbes	00 Motorsport	Ford Falcon (AU)	30	+ 9 laps	28
Ret	46	(New Zealand) John Faulkner	John Faulkner Racing	Holden Commodore (VX)	36	Retired	6
Ret	31	(Australia) Steven Ellery	Steven Ellery Racing	Ford Falcon (AU)	29	Retired	21
Ret	5	(Australia) Glenn Seton	Glenn Seton Racing	Ford Falcon (AU)	5	Retired	15
Ret	54	(New Zealand) Craig Baird	Rod Nash Racing	Holden Commodore (VX)	4	Retired	20
