= List of Bathurst 24 Hour vehicles =

The following is a list of all the cars that have raced in the two Bathurst 24 Hour motor race in 2002 and 2003. This is a list of cars as they were sold and marketed to the general public, not the homologation racing editions.

== Alfa Romeo ==
Alfa Romeo 156 - 2003

== BMW ==
BMW 318i - 2002
BMW 320i - 2002, 2003
BMW 323i - 2002
BMW M Coupe - 2002, 2003
BMW M3 - 2002, 2003

== Ferrari ==
Ferrari 360 - 2002, 2003

== Ford ==
Ford Falcon - 2002, 2003

== Holden ==
Holden Commodore - 2002, 2003
Holden Monaro - 2002, 2003

== Honda ==
Honda Integra - 2003
Honda S2000 - 2002, 2003

== Lamborghini ==
Lamborghini Diablo - 2003

== Mazda ==
Mazda RX-7 - 2002

== Mitsubishi ==
Mitsubishi Lancer Evolution - 2002, 2003
Mitsubishi Magna - 2002
Mitsubishi Mirage - 2002, 2003

== Morgan ==
Morgan Aero 8 - 2003

== Mosler ==
Mosler MT900 - 2002, 2003

== Nissan ==
Nissan 200SX - 2002, 2003
Nissan 350Z - 2002, 2003

== Porsche ==
Porsche 996 - 2002, 2003

== Subaru ==
Subaru Impreza WRX - 2002, 2003

== Toyota ==
Toyota Altezza - 2003
Toyota Celica - 2003
Toyota MR2 - 2002
