= Bathurst 24 Hour =

- Venue: Mount Panorama Circuit
- First race: 2002
- Last race: 2003
- Duration: 24 hours
- Most wins (driver): Jason Bright (1); Peter Brock (1); Todd Kelly (1); Cameron McConville (1); Greg Murphy (1); Nathan Pretty (1); Steven Richards (1); Garth Tander (1)
- Most wins (team): Garry Rogers Motorsport (2)
- Most wins (manufacturer): Holden (2)

The Bathurst 24 Hour was an endurance race for GT and production cars held at the Mount Panorama Circuit in Bathurst, New South Wales in 2002 and 2003. Only two races were held before the collapse of the management organisation PROCAR. Both races were won by V8 Supercar team Garry Rogers Motorsport with Holden Monaros.

== Classes and entrants ==
The Bathurst 24 Hour featured various classes. The entrants were mainly drivers from local racing competitions including the Nations Cup, Super Touring and Carrera Cup competitions. Both races also saw international teams enter cars.

=== 2002 ===
Group 1

Group 1 was for cars complying with FIA N-GT, Nations Cup Group 1 and British GT GTO regulations, with engine capacity over 3.5 litres. Models represented were the Ferrari 360 N-GT, Holden Monaro 427C, Mosler MT900R, Porsche 996 GT3-RS, Porsche 996 GT3-R and the Porsche 996 GT3 Cup.

Group 3

Group 3 was for cars complying with FIA Group N and Nations Cup Group 2 regulations, with engine capacity between 2.0 and 3.2 litres. Models represented were the BMW 318i, BMW 320i and the BMW M Coupe.

Group 5

Group 5 was for GT Performance road cars under $150,000. Models represented were the BMW M3, Ford Tickford TE50, HSV GTS, Mazda RX-7, Mitsubishi Lancer Evolution, Nissan 200SX, Nissan 350Z and the Subaru Impreza WRX STi.

Group 9

Group 9 was for GT Performance road cars under $80,000. Models represented were the BMW 323i, Holden Commodore, Honda S2000 and the Toyota MR2.

Group 10

Group 10 was an invitational class for Future Touring, Mitsubishi Mirage Cup and Super Production cars. Models represented were the BMW M3, Holden Commodore, Mitsubishi Magna and the Mitsubishi Mirage.

=== 2003 ===
Class A

Class A was for cars complying with FIA N-GT, Nations Cup Group 1 and British GT GTO regulations. Models represented were the BMW M3 GTR, Ferrari 360 N-GT, Holden Monaro 427C, Lamborghini Diablo GTR, Mosler MT900R, Porsche 996 GT3-RS and the Porsche 996 GT3-RC.

Class B

Class B was for cars complying with Nations Cup Group 2, Carrera Cup and British GT GT Cup regulations. Models represented were the BMW M Coupe, Ferrari 360 Modena, Morgan Aero 8 and the Porsche 996 GT3 Cup.

Class D

Class D was for GT Performance road cars under $160,000. Models represented were the BMW M3, BMW M Coupe, FPV GT, HSV GTS, Mitsubishi Lancer Evolution, Nissan 200SX, Nissan 350Z and the Subaru Impreza WRX STi.

Class E

Class E was for GT Performance road cars under $90,000. Models represented were the Alfa Romeo 156, Ford Falcon, Holden Commodore, Honda Integra, Honda S2000 and the Toyota Celica.

Class F

Class F was an invitational class for FIA Group N, Future Touring, Mitsubishi Mirage Cup and Super Production cars. Models represented were the BMW 320i, BMW M3, BMW M3-R, Ford Falcon, Holden Commodore, Mitsubishi Mirage and the Toyota Altezza.

== Race winners ==
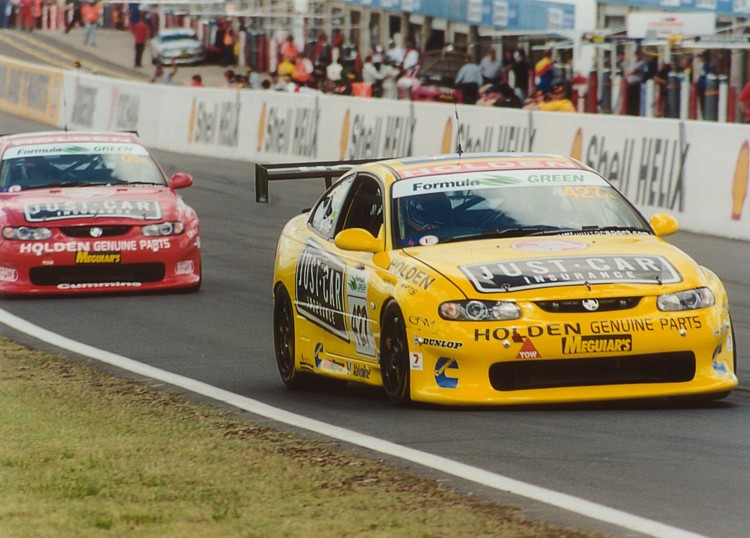
The two Holden Monaro 427Cs competing in the 2003 race. Car 427 (yellow) won in 2002, while car 05 (red) won in 2003.

Year	Drivers	Vehicle	Entrant	Laps	Distance
2002	(Australia) Cameron McConville (Australia) Nathan Pretty (New Zealand) Steven Richards (Australia) Garth Tander	Holden Monaro 427C	Garry Rogers Motorsport	532	3305.32 km
2003	(Australia) Jason Bright (Australia) Peter Brock (Australia) Todd Kelly (New Zealand) Greg Murphy	Holden Monaro 427C	Garry Rogers Motorsport	527	3274.25 km

== See also ==
- List of Bathurst 24 Hour vehicles
