= Holden Monaro 427C =

Australian GT race car

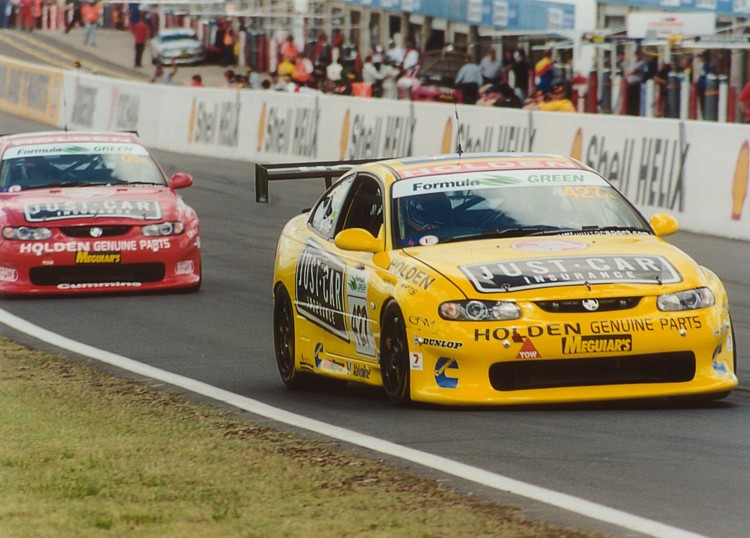
- Category: Australian Nations Cup Championship
- Constructor: (Australia) Garry Rogers Motorsport

Technical specifications
- Suspension (front): MacPherson struts, coil springs, anti-roll bar
- Suspension (rear): Semi trailing arms, coil springs, anti-roll bar
- Length: 4,789 mm (189 in)
- Width: 1,841 mm (72 in)
- Height: 1,397 mm (55 in)
- Axle track: 1,559 mm (61 in) (F); 1,577 mm (62 in) (R)
- Wheelbase: 2,788 mm (110 in)
- Engine: GRM designed Chevrolet LS6 7.0 L (7,000 cc; 427 cu in) 90° V8 naturally aspirated, front engine, longitudinally mounted
- Transmission: Holinger 6-speed Sequential shift plus reverse gear
- Power: 2002: 700 hp (522 kW) @ 6700 RPM, 780 ft⋅lbf (1,060 N⋅m) @ 4800 RPM torque 2003-04: 600 hp (447 kW) @ 5700 RPM, 780 ft⋅lbf (1,060 N⋅m) @ 4800 RPM torque with 30mm FIA air restrictors
- Weight: 1,400 kg (3,086 lb)
- Lubricants: Valvoline
- Tyres: Dunlop; OZ Wheels; Front: 18 x 11 inches Rear: 18 x 13 inches

Competition history
- Notable entrants: (Australia) Garry Rogers Motorsport (Australia) Team Brock
- Notable drivers: (Australia) Garth Tander (Australia) Nathan Pretty (New Zealand) Steven Richards (Australia) Cameron McConville (Australia) Peter Brock (New Zealand) Greg Murphy (Australia) Jason Bright (Australia) Todd Kelly (Australia) James Brock
- Debut: 2002 Bathurst 24 Hour
Races	Wins
50	18

The Holden Monaro 427C was an Australian built and designed GT style race car based on the Holden Monaro CV8 road car. The car ran in the Procar Australia-run Australian Nations Cup Championship and at the short-lived Bathurst 24 Hour race at the famous Mount Panorama Circuit in Bathurst.

== Concept ==
In 2002 Holden Motorsport was looking at running a Holden Monaro in the first ever Bathurst 24 Hour endurance race against the likes of the Lamborghini Diablo GTR, Ferrari 360 N-GT, Chrysler Viper ACR and Porsche 911 GT3 that were regulars in the Nations Cup Championship. After the Holden Racing Team reportedly turned down the job of building the Monaro, Garry Rogers Motorsport accepted the task of building the car as well as running it. The Monaro was originally intended to be debuted in 2003, but after the go ahead had been given for the Bathurst 24 Hour to be run in November 2002, the car's build and development time shortened to just 9 months.

The Monaros ran a GRM developed version of the Chevrolet Corvette C5-R's 7.0 litre (427 cui) motor which had taken numerous class wins in the 24 Hours of Le Mans and the American Le Mans Series as well as outlasting the Prototypes to take overall victory in the 2001 24 Hours of Daytona. However, while the racing Corvette's used a purpose-built racing version of the LS1 V8 engine (dubbed the LS1.R), the GRM 427 cui engines were instead based on the road-going Chevrolet Corvette Z06's upgraded (but still 5.7L) LS6 engine block (the internals of the Monaro engines did include a number of the C5-R's "off the shelf" GM racing parts in order to bring them up to the full 7.0L size and internally GRM still refer to them as their C5-R engines). GRM's engines were built by the team's engine builders Mike Excel, who also designed a special inlet manifold for the engine, and Jeff Maxwell.

The aero kit (front and rear wings) on the Monaro was based on the similar aero package used on the Holden VX Commodore that ran in V8 Supercars (the Monaro road car was a 2-door coupé version of the VX Commodore), though the rear wing was larger than a V8 Supercar's and to conform to GT regulations had to be lower in height than the cars roof line. GRM and Holden Motorsport also used a lot of their V8 Supercar components on the Monaro to make it a stronger race car. The car ran on 18 x 11 inch wheels at the front and 18 x 13 inch wheels at the rear while the wheels were supplied by OZ Wheels. The cars were also fitted with a 6-speed sequential gearbox made by Melbourne-based racing gearbox supplier Peter Holinger.

The Nations Cup Monaro was controversial thanks to its 7.0 litre V8 as the road going Monaro was only equipped with the smaller, 5.7 litre Gen III (LS1) V8. Many of the categories fans and a number of the other competitors felt that the car should have been using the 5.7L engine, as all other cars in the GT based Nations Cup Championship were required to use production based engines of the same capacity as their road going versions. However, Procar (founded and funded by long time Dick Johnson Racing's multi-millionaire sponsor Ross Palmer of Palmer Tube Mills fame) wanted a local manufacturer competing for wins in the championship's top category and gave Holden special permission to use the 7.0 litre engine in the Monaro in order to better compete with higher powered 6.0 litre, V12 Lamborghini and the 8.0 litre, V10 Viper. Having the 7 litre engines without there also being a road car equivalent saw a misconception almost from the cars beginning that the Monaros were actually running the full Le Mans C5-R race engines which were claimed to give them an unfair advantage. Unfortunately, a large part of the fans' confusion was because Nations Cup and Bathurst 24 Hour TV broadcaster Channel 7 promoted the Monaros as having a "Corvette based engine", but it was never explained by either Channel 7 or Holden that the engines were actually upgraded versions from the Z06 road car and not the same 7 litre motors used in the Corvette race cars.

Holden did later announce the HRT 427 road car which was unveiled at the 2002 Sydney Motor Show and it was widely believed that this would be the road going version of the 427C race car. The HRT 427 (HRT for the Holden Racing Team, although technically they had little or nothing to do with the project other than the use of the name) was based on a modified Holden Monaro bodyshell and, among other things, it featured a 580 hp (433 kW) 7.0-Litre V8 engine developed by long time Sprintcar and NASCAR Stock Car engine builder John Sidney of John Sidney Racing (JSR) in Melbourne. However, due to the high cost specifications, the business case for full production failed since Holden could not built the 427 in such limited quantities for the original asking price of A$215,000. In all, only two road and four racing versions were ever built.

The first car was built in mid-2002 and was given a shakedown run by GRM's V8 Supercars lead driver Garth Tander at the Calder Park Raceway in Melbourne before it made its first public appearance when Holden Motorsport bought track time at the 2002 Bob Jane T-Marts 1000 V8 Supercar race at Bathurst in order to promote the Bathurst 24 Hour to be run later in the year (much to the chagrin of V8 Supercars management who didn't know until moments before the Monaro hit the track that the time would be used to promote a "rival Bathurst race"). On track at Bathurst the yellow Monaro (nicknamed the "Nuclear banana") wore Tander's usual #34 rather than the #427 which it would wear until the end of 2004. Prior to the 24 Hour race, GRM also completed limited testing with its three of its four nominated drivers at the tight Winton Motor Raceway in rural Victoria (Cameron McConville wasn't brought into the team until about a week before the race and his first drives of the car were actually in qualifying for the 2002 Bathurst 24 Hour).

== 2002 ==
=== Bathurst 24 Hour ===
In its race debut at the 2002 Bathurst 24 Hour, the #427 Monaro was driven by Tander and fellow V8 Supercar drivers Steven Richards, Nathan Pretty and Cameron McConville. McConville's first drive of the car was actually during qualifying where he qualified the car in second place on the grid. As expected, GRM's regular driver Garth Tander started the race and using the power of the 7.0 litre engine was able to take the lead almost from the start. Although Holden cars had a strong reputation at Bathurst and the similar engined Corvette C5-R's had scored numerous class wins in GT endurance racing, the Monaro was seen as too new pre-race and wasn't really considered a chance of winning or even finishing its debut race despite the relatively low quality of the field with only 3 or 4 of the 36 entrants considered a true chance for outright honours. While the 7.0 L engine with its off the shelf GM racing parts was mostly a known quantity, many felt that the Monaro's other racing components would have suspect reliability. Although as veteran driver, twice Bathurst 1000 winner and winner of the inaugural Bathurst 12 Hour Allan Grice pointed out, the Monaro shared a lot of parts with V8 Supercars which had over 10 years of proven Bathurst race history, while fellow (7 time) Bathurst 1000 winner Jim Richards, who is also the father of Monaro driver Steven Richards, labelled the Monaro "A better V8 Supercar".

Holden had expected that the Monaro would be given a rev limit of 6,700 by Procar as that was generally what the Le Mans Corvette's used. However, when GRM got to Bathurst they were informed that the Monaros had to be set for 5,700 rpm, a full 1,000 below expected. As driver Nathan Pretty would later point out, the 7.0L V8s had shown in testing that they didn't make their true power until well after 6,000 rpm so in racing the drivers never got to exploit the real power of the engines, though the torque levels of the engines did often compensate for that loss of power, especially at Bathurst. It was the lower rpm limit that saw a drop-off in power, and a higher overall weight, which was put down as the reason the Monaros didn't match the V8 Supercar times on Mount Panorama.

After Tander used the torque of the 7.0 litre V8 to take the lead from the John Bowe driven Ferrari 360 at the start, the car suffered an early flat tyre which dropped it to second behind the Cirtek Motorsport Porsche 996 GT3 RS of David Brabham, while the high revving, 3.6 litre V8 Ferrari had already suffered the first of two engine failures early on and was out of contention. Then, just a few hours into the race after re-taking the lead from the Porsche, the entire fuel cell of the Monaro needed to be replaced, dropping the car 13 laps behind. The team overcame the fuel cell problem as well as the car becoming jammed between gears just before sunrise after Nathan Pretty was hit by the BMW 318i of Debbie Chapman in The Chase, which also caused damage to the driver's side door. The Monaro spun and stalled, jamming the gearbox, forcing Pretty to get out and rock the car back and forth to clear the problem, a task made difficult by the Monaro's Sequential transmission and its 1,400 kg (3,086 lb) weight. By the 18-hour mark (10 AM Sunday morning), the Monaro had clawed its way back to second place, only three laps behind the leading Porsche. Then after a trouble free run, the Porsche broke a half-shaft with Brabham at the wheel, causing the car to pit for four laps. Sensationally, the Monaro pitted at the same time as the Porsche to replace rear suspension bolts that had broken away from the chassis. The GRM crew won the pit race and the Monaro was able to return to the track and re-take the lead for good with just over 4 hours remaining. When the Porsche returned to the track, Allan Grice, told to drive as fast as possible, hit the wall on the top of the mountain while attempting to lap the Mosler MT900R driven by Mark Pashley which broke the Porsche's rear suspension and took it out of contention. Upon its return to the track Darren Palmer put the car into the wall at Griffin's Bend with no steering, a legacy of the Grice crash.

The Monaro ran in the lead for the last four hours to win the race by 24 laps from the British entered Mosler MT900R of Martin Short. In the race, Tander's fastest race lap of 2:14.3267 was actually quicker than Brad Jones' pole time of 2:15.0742 and quicker than McConville's qualifying time of 2:16.8792 (in the warm up session prior to the race, Tander had actually recorded a 2:13.6871 which was the fastest time of the session by some 6.3313 seconds). With the demise of the Bathurst 24 Hour and Nations Cup after 2003 and 2004 respectively, Tander's 2002 fastest race lap time stands as the Nations Cup class record lap for Mount Panorama.

== 2003 ==
=== Nations Cup ===
It was then widely expected that regular GRM V8 Supercar driver Tander would drive the car in the 2003 Australian Nations Cup Championship, and Tander himself stated that he would like to race the car. However, with input from Holden Motorsport it was former AUSCAR and part-time V8 Supercar driver Nathan Pretty who was given the drive instead. Pretty went on to score numerous race wins in the series, including round wins at Symmons Plains and Winton, but would finish third in the eight round championship behind the Lamborghini of Paul Stokell and John Bowe in a Ferrari.

Following the Monaro's dominant Bathurst 24 Hour win, Procar enforced the use of air restrictors on Monaros (as they did other competitors in the name of parity) which they would use for the rest of their racing life. The FIA approved 30mm air restrictors brought power back down from an alleged 700 hp (522 kW) to around 600 hp (447 kW), though torque would remain the same at around 780 N⋅m (580 lb⋅ft).

In 2003 GRM built a second car for the legendary touring car driver Peter Brock which would make its on track debut in Round 2 of the championship at Symmons Plains in Tasmania. Brock had driven the Bathurst winning Monaro at the Nations Cup support races at the 2003 Australian Grand Prix in Melbourne before the start of the championship a few weeks later in Adelaide. In Melbourne the car ran with Brock's famous #05 rather than its usual #427, winning all four races after battling with the Lamborghini Diablo of Paul Stokell, though Brock admitted that he would not have won any of those races had Stokell not struck trouble in each race. He then drove the new car, painted red and, until late in the series, without the Monaro teams sponsorship of Just Car Insurance (GRM's usual major sponsor in V8 Supercars was Valvoline), in the Nations Cup Championship alongside Pretty, though he did not win a Nations cup round or race until the opening race of the final round at Surfers Paradise. Pretty and Brock finished third and fourth respectively in the 2003 championship.

=== Bathurst 24 Hour ===
Against a much better quality field than in 2002, including the Stokell Lamborghini, a new 5.0 L BMW M3 GTR V8 for John Bowe, the Ferrari 360 N-GT with David Brabham leading the driving, the Martin Short Mosler MT900R that had finished second the previous year and had since won the 2003 British GT Championship and the GTO class at the 2003 1000 km of Spa (finishing 6th outright), as well as numerous international and Australian Porsche 911's of various specifications, it was the Brock Monaro which won the 2003 Bathurst 24 Hour with V8 Supercar drivers Jason Bright, Todd Kelly and Greg Murphy sharing the driving. The winning car from 2002, driven by the same four drivers as the previous year, finished second, only 0.3505 seconds behind after 527 laps (5 less than in 2002) and 24 hours of racing.

After easily qualifying 1-2 with Tander claiming pole with a time of 2:13.2856 (the fastest ever Monaro and Nations Cup time around The Mountain), 2.7 seconds faster than Murphy in 05 and some 4.4 seconds faster than John Bowe in 3rd, the Monaros controlled the race which was run in wet and dry conditions with the rain at one point (after just a couple of hours) coming down hard enough to have the entire field of 46 cars stopped on the pit straight for almost 10 minutes for safety reasons (also due to the lightning, race broadcaster Channel 7's camera operators around the circuit were forced to stand down from their metal tube scaffolds). The main opposition was expected to come from the Nations Cup winning V12 Lamborghini Diablo of Paul Stokell which also included talented young Danish driver Allan Simonsen in the driver lineup. However, despite Stokell having the speed to match the Monaros in the early laps, its challenge was thwarted by numerous punctures and they would eventually finish 40 laps down in 8th place. With seven minutes to go in the race, and with the two Monaros of Murphy and Tander running nose to tail, team boss Garry Rogers gave his drivers permission to race each other to the finish, with orders to respect the work put into the event by the team and not to take each other out. Tander was all over Murphy in the final four laps of the race and set the race's fastest lap of 2:14.489 with just three laps to go (Murphy's corresponding lap time was a 2:14.499, which was his car's fastest lap of the entire weekend). However, Tander's last chance at snatching victory from Murphy with a last lap lunge into Murray's Corner was thwarted due to yellow flags on the last lap thanks to a BMW parked just before the start/finish line forcing him to stay behind and finish second.

== 2004 ==
=== Nations Cup ===
One more Monaro was built in late 2003, with Peter Brock and his son James to run as Team Brock in the 2004 Australian Nations Cup Championship. Although the championship had lost the talents of John Bowe who was concentrating on V8 Supercars, it did get some new contenders. Mark Coffey Racing, who had co-run the Lamborghini in the Bathurst 24 Hour with Team Lamborghini, had purchased an ex-ALMS Ferrari 550 Millenio from Team Rafanelli. The Ferrari 550 (the same model that had won the GTS Class in the 2003 24 Hours of Le Mans, defeating the Corvette C5-R's that used the same size 7.0 L V8s as the Monaros), was powered by a 5.5 litre V12 engine and produced approximately 600 bhp (447 kW; 608 PS). It was driven in Nations Cup by the talented and popular Danish driver Allan Simonsen (who due to the budget needed to run the V12 Ferrari, also drove a Ferrari 360 Challenge in the Trophy Class at events where the 550 wasn't entered). Also driving was privateer David Stevens in a turbocharged Porsche 911 GT2. Peter Brock drove his Bathurst winning car alongside James in the new car, with GRM continuing to run the original car for Nathan Pretty. Of the three, Pretty had the best championship run, finishing second overall behind the Lamborghini of Paul Stokell. James Brock finished the series in fourth place while Peter Brock finished the championship in sixth place despite not contesting all rounds.

== Demise ==
The GRM built Monaros have the distinction of winning both the first and last races they competed in. After the debut victory in the 2002 Bathurst 24 Hour race, James Brock drove his Monaro to victory in the last race of the 2004 Nations Cup Championship at the Mallala Motor Sport Park in South Australia. It would prove to be not only the Monaro 427C's last win, but the last ever race of the Nations Cup Championship as Ross Palmer could no longer afford to fund the series and PROCAR was disbanded after failing to find a major sponsor.

The series was replaced in 2005 by the return of the Australian GT Championship where the Monaros, with their 7.0 litre engines, were ruled ineligible due to the lack of a road-going 7.0 litre Monaro.

After their 2002 Bathurst 24 Hour win, it was expected that the Monaros, with their all-powerful (and some thought unfair) 7.0L V8s, would come to dominate Nations Cup racing. However, while the Monaros were definitely suited to the Mount Panorama Circuit with its long hill climb, long straights and fast, flowing corners, Australia's shorter, tighter racing circuits didn't suit the Holdens, which were mostly bigger, heavier and with less aero and braking ability than their opponents. While the Monaros did get some race and round wins in Nations Cup, including surprisingly twice for Nathan Pretty in 2003 and 2004 at the tight and twisty Winton Motor Raceway, it was the more track-focused Italian sports cars such as the Lamborghini Dialbo GTR and Ferrari 360 N-GT which would largely dominate the race wins over the two seasons the Monaros ran in the series.

The 2002 Bathurst 24 Hour race-winning Monaro currently resides at the National Motor Racing Museum, located outside of Murray's Corner at Mount Panorama in Bathurst. The 2003 Bathurst 24 Hour winner is currently owned by a historic car racing enthusiast, the third Monaro driven by James Brock was placed under auction on 20 February 2020.

Greg Murphy drove the 2003 Bathurst 24 Hour winning No.05 Monaro at the 2025 Goodwood Festival of Speed.

== Race Wins ==
- Bathurst 24 Hour – 2002, 2003
- Australian Grand Prix Support Race – 2003 (x4)
- Australian Nations Cup Championship – 2003 (x5), 2004 (x7)
