= 2002 Bathurst 24 Hour =

Endurance motor race in Australia

Seasons
- ← none 2003 →

Layout of the Mount Panorama Circuit

The 2002 Bathurst 24 Hour was an endurance motor race staged at the Mount Panorama Circuit just outside Bathurst in New South Wales, Australia. The race, which was the first 24-hour event to be held at Mount Panorama, started at 4:00pm on 16 November and finished at 4:00pm on 17 November. It was the first 24 Hour race to be held in Australia since the 1954 Mount Druitt 24 Hours Road Race.

The race was open to several classes of GT and other production based cars and was intended as a showcase for the racing categories promoted by PROCAR, which included Nations Cup, GT Performance and GT Production. While there was much speculation about the highly popular V8 Brute Utes class also being eligible there was resistance to the idea and they ran short sprint races as a support category. Ten classes were announced, but only five classes attracted entries.

The race was won by Garth Tander, Steven Richards, Nathan Pretty and Cameron McConville driving a Holden Monaro. The Holden quartet completed 532 laps of the 6.213 km (3.861 mi) long public road circuit for a total distance of 3,305.316 km (2,053.828 mi).

== Group structure ==
The race was open to entries in ten Groups.

=== Group 1 ===
For FIA N-GT, British GTO, All Japan GT and Nations Cup (Group 1) cars. It featured the Ferrari 360 N-GT, Mosler MT900R, Porsche 996 GT3-RS, Porsche 996 GT3 Cup and the controversial Holden Monaro 427C which did not have a production counterpart.

=== Group 2 ===
For Porsche Supercup cars. No entries were received.

=== Group 3 ===
For Nations Cup (Group 2) cars and Super Touring Cars. Only three BMWs entered, Super Touring versions of the 318i and 320i and a modified Z3 M Coupe.

=== Group 4 ===
For FIA Super 2000 cars. No entries were received.

=== Group 5 ===
For Australian GT Performance Cars. The entry consisted of BMW ME Coupe, Ford Tickford T3 TE50, HSV Y Series GTS, Mazda RX-7 Series 8, Mitsubishi Lancer Evolution, Nissan 200SX, Nissan 350Z and Subaru Impreza WRX STi.

=== Group 6 ===
For FIA Group N cars (3001cc and over). No entries were received.

=== Group 7 ===
For FIA Group N cars (2500cc-3000cc). No entries were received.

=== Group 8 ===
For FIA Super Production cars and New Zealand Schedule S cars. No entries were received.

=== Group 9 ===
For Australian GT Production Cars. The entry consisted of BMW 323i, Holden VX Commodore, Honda S2000 and Toyota MR2 Bathurst.

=== Group 10 ===
For Invited cars including Future Tourers and Mirage series cars. Entries included Future Tourer Holden Commodores and a Holden V8 engined Mitsubishi Magna, a pair of Nürburgring VLN series BMW M3s and Mitsubishi Mirages.

== Top 10 Qualifiers ==
The top 10 qualifiers for the 2002 Bathurst 24 Hour were as follows:

Pos	No	Team	Driver	Car	Qual
Pole	888	(Australia) Prancing Horse Racing Scuderia	(Australia) Brad Jones	Ferrari 360 N-GT	2:15.0742
2	427	(Australia) Garry Rogers Motorsport	(Australia) Cameron McConville	Holden Monaro 427C	2:17.7269
3	24	(United Kingdom) Cirtek Motorsport	(Australia) David Brabham	Porsche 996 GT3-RS	2:19.5861
4	11	(United Kingdom) Rollcentre Racing	(United Kingdom) Martin Short	Mosler MT900R	2:21.4492
5	52	(Germany) Seikel Motorsport	(Canada) Tony Burgess	Porsche 996 GT3-RS	2:22.7314
6	6	(United Kingdom) AD Holdings	(Australia) Peter Floyd	Porsche 996 GT3-RS	2:23.8472
7	33	(Australia) Pro-Duct Motorsport	(Australia) Bob Pearson	Mazda RX-7 Twin Turbo	2:28.4775
8	19	(New Zealand) Bruce Miles	(New Zealand) Bruce Miles	BMW 320i	2:28.7187
9	40	(Australia) Compuware	(Australia) Terry Bosnjak	Mitsubishi Magna	2:28.8974
10	15	(Germany) Duller Motorsport	(United Kingdom) Ian Donaldson	BMW M3	2:29.0311

* During the first qualifying session, the #999 PHR Scuderia Porsche 996 GT3-RS driven by Jim Richards set a time of 2:20.4364 which would have placed the car 4th on the grid. However, later during that same qualifying session, Peter Fitzgerald crashed on the top of the mountain which damaged the car beyond immediate repair. PHR were then forced to substitute team owner Maher Algadrie's Porsche 996 GT3 Cup car in the race. Due to having to substitute cars, the original lap time did not count and the GT3 Cup car eventually qualified in 14th place.
* According to Monaro driver Cameron McConville, as he was such a late addition to the driving line up only a week prior to the race when it was decided that 4 drivers would be better than 3, his first drive of the car actually came in the qualifying session where he managed to set the car's fastest qualifying time, good enough for 2nd on the grid.
* At the recent Sandown 500, the Ferrari 360 N-GT's were severely restricted on top speed by Procar's FIA approved air restrictors. With these allowed to be removed for Bathurst, Brad Jones found enough speed in the 3.6L V8 Ferrari to put it on pole position.

== Official results ==
Results as follows

Pos	Group	No	Team	Drivers	Chassis	Laps	Qual Pos
Pos	Group	No	Team	Drivers	Engine	Laps	Qual Pos
1	1	427	(Australia) Garry Rogers Motorsport	(Australia) Garth Tander (New Zealand) Steven Richards (Australia) Nathan Pretty (Australia) Cameron McConville	Holden Monaro 427C	532	2
1	1	427	(Australia) Garry Rogers Motorsport	(Australia) Garth Tander (New Zealand) Steven Richards (Australia) Nathan Pretty (Australia) Cameron McConville	Chevrolet LS6 7.0L V8	532	2
2	1	11	(United Kingdom) Rollcentre Racing	(United Kingdom) Martin Short (United Kingdom) Mark Pashley (United Kingdom) Charles Lamb (Sri Lanka) Dilantha Malagamuwa	Mosler MT900R	509	4
2	1	11	(United Kingdom) Rollcentre Racing	(United Kingdom) Martin Short (United Kingdom) Mark Pashley (United Kingdom) Charles Lamb (Sri Lanka) Dilantha Malagamuwa	Chevrolet LS1 5.7L V8	509	4
3	10	16	(Germany) Duller Motorsport	(United Kingdom) Howard Redhouse (United Kingdom) Peter Hannen (Australia) Domenic Beninca	BMW M3	505	12
3	10	16	(Germany) Duller Motorsport	(United Kingdom) Howard Redhouse (United Kingdom) Peter Hannen (Australia) Domenic Beninca	BMW M52 3.2L I6	505	12
4	10	15	(Germany) Duller Motorsport	(United Kingdom) Ian Donaldson (United Kingdom) Robert Brooks (New Zealand) Rob Wilson (United Kingdom) Andrew Donaldson	BMW M3	497	10
4	10	15	(Germany) Duller Motorsport	(United Kingdom) Ian Donaldson (United Kingdom) Robert Brooks (New Zealand) Rob Wilson (United Kingdom) Andrew Donaldson	BMW M52 3.2L I6	497	10
5	3	35	(United Kingdom) Sterling Motorsport	(Australia) VJ Angelo (Australia) Ric Shaw (United Kingdom) Mathew Marsh (Australia) Ross Buckingham	BMW M Coupe	496	16
5	3	35	(United Kingdom) Sterling Motorsport	(Australia) VJ Angelo (Australia) Ric Shaw (United Kingdom) Mathew Marsh (Australia) Ross Buckingham	BMW M54 3.2L I6	496	16
6	5	71	(Australia) Peter Boylan	(Australia) Peter Boylan (Australia) Damien White (Australia) Peter McKay	BMW M3	491	15
6	5	71	(Australia) Peter Boylan	(Australia) Peter Boylan (Australia) Damien White (Australia) Peter McKay	BMW M54 3.2L I6	491	15
7	5	23	(Australia) Peters Racing	(Australia) Brett Peters (Australia) Gary Deane (Australia) Robert Rubis (Australia) John Falk	Subaru Impreza WRX STi	482	17
7	5	23	(Australia) Peters Racing	(Australia) Brett Peters (Australia) Gary Deane (Australia) Robert Rubis (Australia) John Falk	Subaru EJ 2.0L Turbo Flat-4	482	17
8	5	60	(Australia) Protecnica Racing	(Australia) Scott Anderson (Australia) Wayne Boatwright (Australia) Ross Almond (Australia) Ross Halliday	Subaru Impreza WRX STi	475	20
8	5	60	(Australia) Protecnica Racing	(Australia) Scott Anderson (Australia) Wayne Boatwright (Australia) Ross Almond (Australia) Ross Halliday	Subaru EJ 2.0L Turbo Flat-4	475	20
9	5	17	(Australia) Trevor Haines	(Australia) Trevor Haines (Australia) Mark King (Australia) Trevor Sheumack (Australia) James Phillip	Ford Tickford T3 TE50	474	22
9	5	17	(Australia) Trevor Haines	(Australia) Trevor Haines (Australia) Mark King (Australia) Trevor Sheumack (Australia) James Phillip	Ford Windsor 5.6L V8	474	22
10	9	62	(Australia) Scott Loadsman	(Australia) Scott Loadsman (Australia) Ian Luff (Australia) Ray Lintott (Australia) David Russell	Holden Commodore VX SS	463	33
10	9	62	(Australia) Scott Loadsman	(Australia) Scott Loadsman (Australia) Ian Luff (Australia) Ray Lintott (Australia) David Russell	Chevrolet LS1 5.7L V8	463	33
11	10	44	(Australia) Mal Rose	(Australia) Gary Young (Australia) Gary Quartly (Australia) Anthony Robson	Mitsubishi Mirage	459	29
11	10	44	(Australia) Mal Rose	(Australia) Gary Young (Australia) Gary Quartly (Australia) Anthony Robson	Mitsubishi 1.5L I4	459	29
12	10	14	(Australia) David Borg	(Australia) David Borg (Australia) Allan Shepherd (Australia) Jack Elsegood	Mitsubishi Mirage	457	30
12	10	14	(Australia) David Borg	(Australia) David Borg (Australia) Allan Shepherd (Australia) Jack Elsegood	Mitsubishi 1.5L I4	457	30
13	9	26	(Australia) Novocastrian Motorsport	(Australia) Wayne Moore (Australia) Roger Townshend (Australia) Klark Quinn (Australia) Tony Blanche	BMW 323i	455	34
13	9	26	(Australia) Novocastrian Motorsport	(Australia) Wayne Moore (Australia) Roger Townshend (Australia) Klark Quinn (Australia) Tony Blanche	BMW M52 2.5L I4	455	34
14	9	29	(Australia) Ross Palmer Motorsport	(Australia) Peter Hansen (Germany) Hermann Tilke (Australia) Melinda Price	Honda S2000	451	31
14	9	29	(Australia) Ross Palmer Motorsport	(Australia) Peter Hansen (Germany) Hermann Tilke (Australia) Melinda Price	Honda F20C 2.0L I4	451	31
15	1	99	(Australia) Prancing Horse Racing Scuderia	(New Zealand) Jim Richards (Australia) Matt Weiland (Indonesia) Maher Algadrie (Australia) Peter Fitzgerald	Porsche 996 GT3 R	451	14
15	1	99	(Australia) Prancing Horse Racing Scuderia	(New Zealand) Jim Richards (Australia) Matt Weiland (Indonesia) Maher Algadrie (Australia) Peter Fitzgerald	Porsche 3.6L Flat-6	451	14
16	5	200	(Australia) Haysom Motorsport	(Australia) Greg Haysom (Australia) Craig Dean (Australia) Paul Stubber (Australia) Chris Smith	Nissan 200SX Spec-R	448	32
16	5	200	(Australia) Haysom Motorsport	(Australia) Greg Haysom (Australia) Craig Dean (Australia) Paul Stubber (Australia) Chris Smith	Nissan SR20DET 2.0L Turbo I4	448	32
17	10	32	(Australia) Steve Williams	(Australia) Steve Williams (Australia) Graham Moore (Australia) Mike Kilpatrick	Holden Commodore VX	438	13
17	10	32	(Australia) Steve Williams	(Australia) Steve Williams (Australia) Graham Moore (Australia) Mike Kilpatrick	Holden 5.0L V8	438	13
18	5	220	(Australia) Haysom Motorsport	(United Kingdom) Tony Quinn (Australia) Tony Alford (Australia) John Grounds (Australia) Grant Denyer	Nissan 200SX Spec-R	426	25
18	5	220	(Australia) Haysom Motorsport	(United Kingdom) Tony Quinn (Australia) Tony Alford (Australia) John Grounds (Australia) Grant Denyer	Nissan SR engine 2.0L Turbo I4	426	25
19	10	28	(Australia) Mal Rose	(Australia) Mal Rose (Australia) Peter Leemhuis (Australia) Shane Brangwin	Mitsubishi Mirage	425	28
19	10	28	(Australia) Mal Rose	(Australia) Mal Rose (Australia) Peter Leemhuis (Australia) Shane Brangwin	Mitsubishi 1.5L I4	425	28
20	5	45	(Australia) Allan Walls	(Australia) Allan Walls (Australia) Dennis Cribbin (Australia) Roland Hill	HSV GTS 300kW	424	26
20	5	45	(Australia) Allan Walls	(Australia) Allan Walls (Australia) Dennis Cribbin (Australia) Roland Hill	Chevrolet LS1 5.7L V8	424	26
21	5	222	(Australia) Haysom Motorsport	(Australia) Ray Ayton (Australia) Rodney Woods (Australia) Hugh Harrison (Australia) Michael Robinson	Nissan 200SX Spec-R	424	27
21	5	222	(Australia) Haysom Motorsport	(Australia) Ray Ayton (Australia) Rodney Woods (Australia) Hugh Harrison (Australia) Michael Robinson	Nissan SR engine 2.0L Turbo I4	424	27
22	10	40	(Australia) Palmer Promotions	(Australia) Terry Bosnjak (Australia) Warren Luff (Australia) Ian Palmer (Australia) Ray Sidebottom	Mitsubishi Magna	420	9
22	10	40	(Australia) Palmer Promotions	(Australia) Terry Bosnjak (Australia) Warren Luff (Australia) Ian Palmer (Australia) Ray Sidebottom	Holden 5.0L V8	420	9
23	5	33	(Australia) Pro-Duct Motorsport	(Australia) Bob Pearson (Australia) Mark Brame (Australia) Bruce Stewart (Australia) Peter Roma	Mazda RX-7 Twin Turbo	364	7
23	5	33	(Australia) Pro-Duct Motorsport	(Australia) Bob Pearson (Australia) Mark Brame (Australia) Bruce Stewart (Australia) Peter Roma	Mazda 13B-REW 1.3L Rotary	364	7
24	9	13	(Australia) Osborne Motorsport	(Australia) Colin Osborne (Australia) John Roecken (Australia) Ron Masing	Toyota MR2 Bathurst	324	35
24	9	13	(Australia) Osborne Motorsport	(Australia) Colin Osborne (Australia) John Roecken (Australia) Ron Masing	Toyota 3S-GE 2.0L I4	324	35
25	9	31	(Australia) Osborne Motorsport	(Australia) Trevor Keene (Australia) Scott Fleming (Australia) Andrew Leithhead	Toyota MR2 Bathurst	196	36
25	9	31	(Australia) Osborne Motorsport	(Australia) Trevor Keene (Australia) Scott Fleming (Australia) Andrew Leithhead	Toyota S engine 2.0L I4	196	36
DNF	1	24	(United Kingdom) Cirtek Motorsport	(Australia) David Brabham (Austria) Manfred Jurasz (Australia) Allan Grice (Australia) Darren Palmer	Porsche 996 GT3-RS	488	3
DNF	1	24	(United Kingdom) Cirtek Motorsport	(Australia) David Brabham (Austria) Manfred Jurasz (Australia) Allan Grice (Australia) Darren Palmer	Porsche 3.6L Flat-6	488	3
DNF	5	77	(Australia) Nathan Pilkington	(Australia) Nathan Pilkington (Australia) Ian Mitchell (Australia) Mark Williamson (Australia) Elton Goonan	Nissan 350Z	436	21
DNF	5	77	(Australia) Nathan Pilkington	(Australia) Nathan Pilkington (Australia) Ian Mitchell (Australia) Mark Williamson (Australia) Elton Goonan	Nissan VQ35DE 3.5L V6	436	21
DNF	5	9	(Australia) Anton Mechtler	(Australia) Anton Mechtler (Australia) Wayne Park (New Zealand) Kevin Bell (Australia) Bob Hughes	Mitsubishi Lancer RS-E Evo VII	387	23
DNF	5	9	(Australia) Anton Mechtler	(Australia) Anton Mechtler (Australia) Wayne Park (New Zealand) Kevin Bell (Australia) Bob Hughes	Mitsubishi 4G63 2.0L Turbo I4	387	23
DNF	5	27	(Australia) Novocastrian Motorsport	(Australia) Wayne Russell (Australia) Steve Cramp (Australia) Garry Holt (Australia) Darren Edwards	BMW M Coupe	384	19
DNF	5	27	(Australia) Novocastrian Motorsport	(Australia) Wayne Russell (Australia) Steve Cramp (Australia) Garry Holt (Australia) Darren Edwards	BMW M54 3.2L I6	384	19
DNF	10	41	(Australia) Geoffrey Parker	(Australia) Geoff Parker (Australia) Jeff Watters (Australia) David Sala (Australia) Peter Gazzard	Holden Commodore VY	348	11
DNF	10	41	(Australia) Geoffrey Parker	(Australia) Geoff Parker (Australia) Jeff Watters (Australia) David Sala (Australia) Peter Gazzard	Holden 5.0L V8	348	11
DNF	3	19	(New Zealand) Bruce Miles	(New Zealand) Bruce Miles (New Zealand) Murray Cleland (New Zealand) Gary Geeves	BMW 320i	263	8
DNF	3	19	(New Zealand) Bruce Miles	(New Zealand) Bruce Miles (New Zealand) Murray Cleland (New Zealand) Gary Geeves	BMW S14 2.0L I4	263	8
DNF	5	5	(Australia) Graham Alexander	(Australia) Graham Alexander (Australia) John Woodberry (Australia) Barry Morcom	Mitsubishi Lancer RS-E Evo VII	230	18
DNF	5	5	(Australia) Graham Alexander	(Australia) Graham Alexander (Australia) John Woodberry (Australia) Barry Morcom	Mitsubishi Sirius engine 2.0L Turbo I4	230	18
DNF	1	6	(United Kingdom) AD Holdings	(Australia) Peter Floyd (United Kingdom) Chris Maries (Australia) Rod Wilson (Australia) Gary MacDonald	Porsche 996 GT3-RS	195	6
DNF	1	6	(United Kingdom) AD Holdings	(Australia) Peter Floyd (United Kingdom) Chris Maries (Australia) Rod Wilson (Australia) Gary MacDonald	Porsche 3.6L Flat-6	195	6
DNF	3	22	(New Zealand) DCH Motorsport	(New Zealand) Dennis Chapman (New Zealand) Debbie Chapman (New Zealand) Lindsay O'Donnell (New Zealand) Scott O'Donnell	BMW 318i	126	24
DNF	3	22	(New Zealand) DCH Motorsport	(New Zealand) Dennis Chapman (New Zealand) Debbie Chapman (New Zealand) Lindsay O'Donnell (New Zealand) Scott O'Donnell	BMW S14 2.0L I4	126	24
DNF	1	888	(Australia) Prancing Horse Racing Scuderia	(Australia) John Bowe (Australia) Brad Jones (Australia) Paul Morris (Australia) John Teulan	Ferrari 360 N-GT	96	1
DNF	1	888	(Australia) Prancing Horse Racing Scuderia	(Australia) John Bowe (Australia) Brad Jones (Australia) Paul Morris (Australia) John Teulan	Ferrari 3.6L V8	96	1
DNF	1	52	(Germany) Seikel Motorsport	(Canada) Tony Burgess (New Zealand) Andrew Bagnall (United States) John Lloyd (Germany) Jürgen Alzen	Porsche 996 GT3-RS	58	5
DNF	1	52	(Germany) Seikel Motorsport	(Canada) Tony Burgess (New Zealand) Andrew Bagnall (United States) John Lloyd (Germany) Jürgen Alzen	Porsche 3.6L Flat-6	58	5
DNS	1	999	(Australia) Prancing Horse Racing Scuderia	(New Zealand) Jim Richards (Australia) Matt Weiland (Indonesia) Maher Algadrie (Australia) Peter Fitzgerald	Porsche 996 GT3-RS		4*
DNS	1	999	(Australia) Prancing Horse Racing Scuderia	(New Zealand) Jim Richards (Australia) Matt Weiland (Indonesia) Maher Algadrie (Australia) Peter Fitzgerald	Porsche 3.6L Flat-6		4*

* #999 PHR Scuderia Porsche 996 GT3-RS had set 4th fastest qualifying time. However, due to a practice crash the car was withdrawn and replaced by the teams 996 GT3 Cup car. As the RS was withdrawn the original time was not counted for grid position.

== Statistics ==
- Pole Position - #888 Brad Jones - 2:15.0742
- Fastest Lap - #427 Garth Tander - 2:14.3267 (lap 359)
- Average Speed - 138 km/h
