= 2003 Bathurst 24 Hour =

Seasons
- ← 2002 none →

Layout of the Mount Panorama Circuit

The 2003 Bathurst 24 Hour was a motor race staged at the Mount Panorama Circuit just outside Bathurst in New South Wales, Australia. The race started at 2:00pm on 22 November 2003 and finished at 2:00pm on 23 November. It was the second Bathurst 24 Hour.

The race featured five car classes and was intended as a showcase for the racing categories promoted by Procar Australia, namely Nations Cup cars, GT Performance Cars and Production Cars. It was also open to various other categories which included FIA Group N-GT and Grand-Am GT.

The race was won by Peter Brock, Greg Murphy, Jason Bright and Todd Kelly driving a Holden Monaro 427C. They finished the 24 Hour race only 0.3505 seconds ahead of their team mates Nathan Pretty, Steven Richards, Garth Tander and Cameron McConville in the 2002 race winning Monaro. The Monaros covered 527 laps (5 less than 2002) of the 6.213 km (3.861 mi) long public road circuit for a total distance of 3,274.251 km (2,034.525 mi).

== Class structure ==
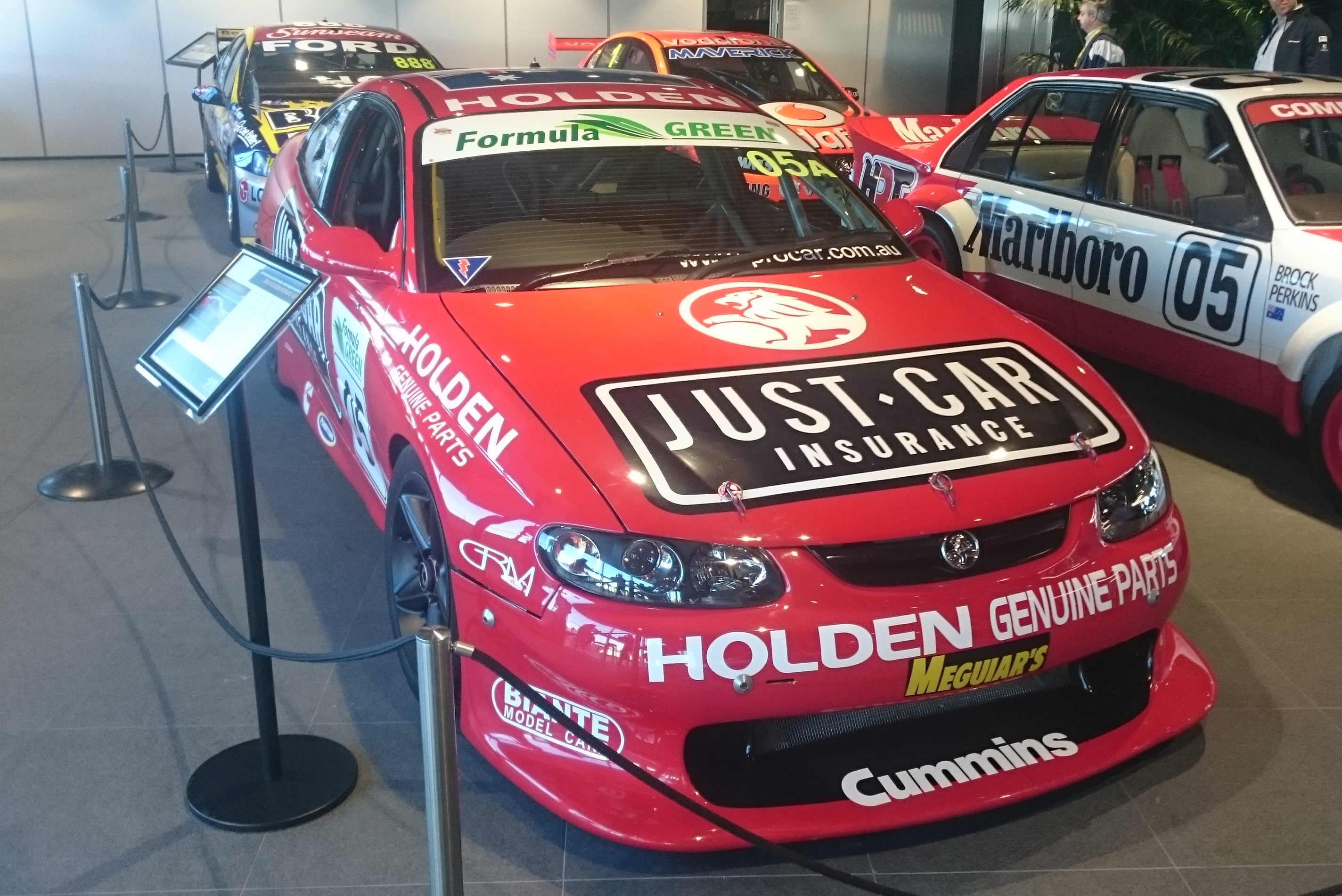
The winning car, pictured in 2018 in its 2003 Bathurst 24 Hour colours.

=== Class A ===
The leading class contained vehicles eligible for international FIA N-GT, American Grand-Am GT and the Australian Nations Cup Group 1 category. It featured BMW M3 GTR, Ferrari 360 N-GT, Mosler MT900R, Porsche 996 GT3-RS, Porsche 996 GT3-RC, Lamborghini Diablo GTR, and the "Nations Cup" version of the Holden Monaro, the 427C

=== Class B ===
Consisted of Nations Cup Group 2 cars: Ferrari 360 Modena, Porsche 996 GT3 Cup and international GTs of varying kinds, Morgan Aero 8, Porsche 996 GT3 S and a modified BMW M Coupe.

=== Class D ===
A production based class featuring cars from the Australian GT Performance Car Championship. The entry consisted of BMW M Coupe, BMW M3, FPV GT, HSV X Series GTS, Mitsubishi Lancer Evolution VII, Nissan 200SX, Nissan 350Z and Subaru Impreza WRX.

=== Class E ===
A production based class featuring cars from the Australian Production Car Championship. The entry consisted of Alfa Romeo 156 GTA, Ford Falcon XR6T, Holden Commodore VY, Honda Integra, Honda S2000 and Toyota Celica SX.

=== Class F ===
The class catered for a variety of vehicles which included Future Touring Ford Falcon, Holden VX Commodore & Holden VY Commodore, a Nürburgring VLN series BMW M3, a Supertouring BMW 320i, an old GT-Production BMW M3-R, New Zealand Schedule S touring car Toyota Altezza and Mitsubishi Mirage Cup one-make series cars.

== Top 10 Qualifiers ==
The top 10 qualifiers for the 2003 Bathurst 24 Hour were as follows:

| Pos | No | Team | Driver | Car | Qual |
|---|---|---|---|---|---|
| Pole | 427 | (Australia) Garry Rogers Motorsport | (Australia) Garth Tander | Holden Monaro 427C | 2:13.2856 |
| 2 | 05 | (Australia) Garry Rogers Motorsport | (New Zealand) Greg Murphy | Holden Monaro 427C | 2:15.9739 |
| 3 | 420 | (Australia) Prancing Horse Racing Scuderia | (Australia) John Bowe | BMW M3 GTR | 2:17.6832 |
| 4 | 900 | (United Kingdom) Rollcentre Racing | (United Kingdom) Martin Short | Mosler MT900R | 2:18.1074 |
| 5 | 54 | (Australia) John Teulan | (Australia) Paul Morris | Porsche 996 GT3 RC | 2:19.3319 |
| 6 | 20 | (Australia) Mark Coffey Racing | (Australia) Paul Stokell | Lamborghini Diablo GTR | 2:19.5626 |
| 7 | 48 | (Austria) BE Racing | (Australia) David Brabham | Ferrari 360 N-GT | 2:21.1258 |
| 8 | 6 | (Germany) Jürgen Alzen Motorsport | (Germany) Jürgen Alzen | Porsche 996 GT3 S Cup | 2:21.7062 |
| 9 | 7 | (Australia) VIP Petfoods Racing | (Australia) Marcus Marshall | Porsche 996 GT3 Cup | 2:22.8980 |
| 10 | 8 | (United Kingdom) Cirtek Motorsport | (Australia) Peter Floyd | Porsche 996 GT3-RS | 2:23.2392 |

== Official results ==
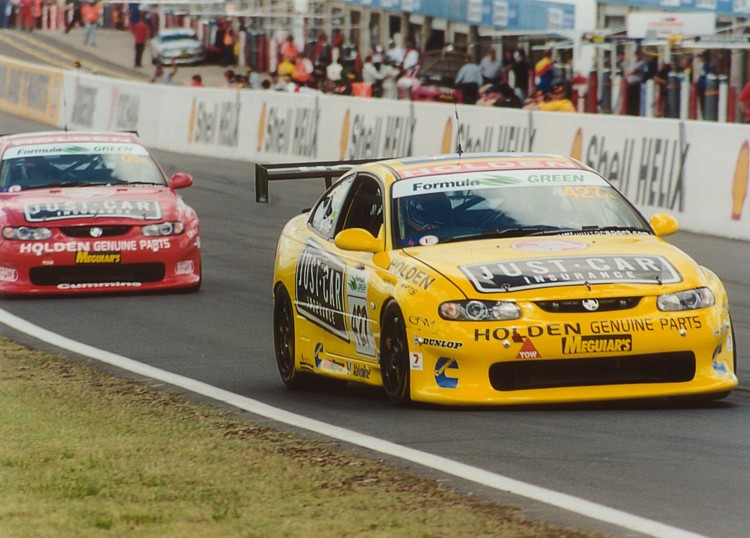
The two Garry Rogers Motorsport Holden Monaros at the 2003 Bathurst 24 Hour motor race

Results as follows:

| Pos | Class | No | Team | Drivers | Chassis | Laps | Qual Pos |
| Pos | Class | No | Team | Drivers | Engine | Laps | Qual Pos |
|---|---|---|---|---|---|---|---|
| 1 | A | 05 | (Australia) Garry Rogers Motorsport | (Australia) Peter Brock (New Zealand) Greg Murphy (Australia) Jason Bright (Australia) Todd Kelly | Holden Monaro 427C | 527 | 2 |
| 1 | A | 05 | (Australia) Garry Rogers Motorsport | (Australia) Peter Brock (New Zealand) Greg Murphy (Australia) Jason Bright (Australia) Todd Kelly | Chevrolet LS6 7.0L V8 | 527 | 2 |
| 2 | A | 427 | (Australia) Garry Rogers Motorsport | (Australia) Nathan Pretty (Australia) Garth Tander (New Zealand) Steven Richards (Australia) Cameron McConville | Holden Monaro 427C | 527 | 1 |
| 2 | A | 427 | (Australia) Garry Rogers Motorsport | (Australia) Nathan Pretty (Australia) Garth Tander (New Zealand) Steven Richards (Australia) Cameron McConville | Chevrolet LS6 7.0L V8 | 527 | 1 |
| 3 | A | 54 | (Australia) John Teulan | (Australia) Peter Fitzgerald (Australia) Paul Morris (Australia) John Teulan (Australia) Scott Shearman | Porsche 996 GT3 RC | 515 | 5 |
| 3 | A | 54 | (Australia) John Teulan | (Australia) Peter Fitzgerald (Australia) Paul Morris (Australia) John Teulan (Australia) Scott Shearman | Porsche 3.6L Flat-6 | 515 | 5 |
| 4 | B | 6 | (Germany) Jürgen Alzen Motorsport | (Germany) Jürgen Alzen (Germany) Uwe Alzen (Germany) Michael Bartels (Germany) Arno Klasen | Porsche 996 GT3 S Cup | 514 | 8 |
| 4 | B | 6 | (Germany) Jürgen Alzen Motorsport | (Germany) Jürgen Alzen (Germany) Uwe Alzen (Germany) Michael Bartels (Germany) Arno Klasen | Porsche 3.6L Flat-6 | 514 | 8 |
| 5 | A | 900 | (United Kingdom) Rollcentre Racing | (United Kingdom) Martin Short (United Kingdom) Patrick Pearce (United Kingdom) Charles Lamb (New Zealand) Heather Spurle | Mosler MT900R | 507 | 4 |
| 5 | A | 900 | (United Kingdom) Rollcentre Racing | (United Kingdom) Martin Short (United Kingdom) Patrick Pearce (United Kingdom) Charles Lamb (New Zealand) Heather Spurle | Chevrolet LS1 5.7L V8 | 507 | 4 |
| 6 | B | 7 | (Australia) VIP Petfoods Racing | (United Kingdom) Tony Quinn (Australia) Marcus Marshall (Australia) Klark Quinn (Australia) Grant Denyer | Porsche 996 GT3 Cup | 495 | 9 |
| 6 | B | 7 | (Australia) VIP Petfoods Racing | (United Kingdom) Tony Quinn (Australia) Marcus Marshall (Australia) Klark Quinn (Australia) Grant Denyer | Porsche 3.6L Flat-6 | 495 | 9 |
| 7 | A | 8 | (United Kingdom) Cirtek Motorsport | (Australia) Peter Floyd (United Kingdom) Ian Donaldson (United Kingdom) Andrew Donaldson (United States) Liz Halliday | Porsche 996 GT3-RS | 491 | 10 |
| 7 | A | 8 | (United Kingdom) Cirtek Motorsport | (Australia) Peter Floyd (United Kingdom) Ian Donaldson (United Kingdom) Andrew Donaldson (United States) Liz Halliday | Porsche 3.6L Flat-6 | 491 | 10 |
| 8 | A | 20 | (Australia) Mark Coffey Racing | (Australia) Paul Stokell (Denmark) Allan Simonsen (Australia) Luke Youlden (Australia) Peter Hackett | Lamborghini Diablo GTR | 487 | 6 |
| 8 | A | 20 | (Australia) Mark Coffey Racing | (Australia) Paul Stokell (Denmark) Allan Simonsen (Australia) Luke Youlden (Australia) Peter Hackett | Lamborghini 6.0L V12 | 487 | 6 |
| 9 | D | 71 | (Australia) Peter Boylan | (Australia) Peter Boylan (Australia) Geoff Morgan (Australia) Rick Bates (Australia) Peter Hansen | BMW M3 | 469 | 19 |
| 9 | D | 71 | (Australia) Peter Boylan | (Australia) Peter Boylan (Australia) Geoff Morgan (Australia) Rick Bates (Australia) Peter Hansen | BMW M54 3.2L I6 | 469 | 19 |
| 10 | F | 59 | (Australia) Steve Williams | (Australia) Steve Williams (Australia) Graham Moore (Australia) Terry Bosnjak | Holden VX Commodore | 460 | 18 |
| 10 | F | 59 | (Australia) Steve Williams | (Australia) Steve Williams (Australia) Graham Moore (Australia) Terry Bosnjak | Holden 5.0L V8 | 460 | 18 |
| 11 | D | 27 | (Australia) Novacastrian Motorsport | (Australia) Wayne Russell (Australia) Steve Cramp (Australia) Mark King (Australia) Paul Stubber | BMW M Coupe | 459 | 28 |
| 11 | D | 27 | (Australia) Novacastrian Motorsport | (Australia) Wayne Russell (Australia) Steve Cramp (Australia) Mark King (Australia) Paul Stubber | BMW M54 3.2L I6 | 459 | 28 |
| 12 | F | 41 | (Australia) Geoffrey Parker | (Australia) Geoff Parker (Australia) Jeff Watters (Australia) David Sala (Australia) Peter Gazzard | Holden VY Commodore | 451 | 16 |
| 12 | F | 41 | (Australia) Geoffrey Parker | (Australia) Geoff Parker (Australia) Jeff Watters (Australia) David Sala (Australia) Peter Gazzard | Holden 5.0L V8 | 451 | 16 |
| 13 | D | 60 | (Australia) Protecnica Racing | (Australia) Wayne Boatwright (Australia) Rod Salmon (Australia) Glen Hastings (Australia) Neil Caswell | Subaru Impreza WRX STI | 449 | 32 |
| 13 | D | 60 | (Australia) Protecnica Racing | (Australia) Wayne Boatwright (Australia) Rod Salmon (Australia) Glen Hastings (Australia) Neil Caswell | Subaru EJ 2.0L Turbo Flat-4 | 449 | 32 |
| 14 | D | 2 | (Australia) Garry Holt | (Australia) Garry Holt (Australia) Gary Young (Australia) Michael Brock (Australia) Kevin Mundy | Mitsubishi Lancer RS-E Evo VII | 445 | 22 |
| 14 | D | 2 | (Australia) Garry Holt | (Australia) Garry Holt (Australia) Gary Young (Australia) Michael Brock (Australia) Kevin Mundy | Mitsubishi 4G63 2.0L Turbo I4 | 445 | 22 |
| 15 | D | 91 | (Australia) Peters Motorsport | (Australia) Gary Deane (Australia) Robert Rubis (Australia) Dean Wanless | Subaru Impreza WRX STI | 439 | 26 |
| 15 | D | 91 | (Australia) Peters Motorsport | (Australia) Gary Deane (Australia) Robert Rubis (Australia) Dean Wanless | Subaru EJ 2.0L Turbo Flat-4 | 439 | 26 |
| 16 | E | 13 | (Australia) Osborne Motorsport | (Australia) Colin Osborne (Australia) John Roecken (Australia) Trevor Keene (Australia) Steve Grocl | Toyota Celica SX | 436 | 43 |
| 16 | E | 13 | (Australia) Osborne Motorsport | (Australia) Colin Osborne (Australia) John Roecken (Australia) Trevor Keene (Australia) Steve Grocl | Toyota 2ZZ-GE 1.8L I4 | 436 | 43 |
| 17 | D | 3 | (Australia) Bendigo Motorsports | (Australia) Craig Dean (Australia) Chris Smith (Australia) Bill Pye | FPV BA GT | 434 | 36 |
| 17 | D | 3 | (Australia) Bendigo Motorsports | (Australia) Craig Dean (Australia) Chris Smith (Australia) Bill Pye | Ford Modular 5.4L V8 | 434 | 36 |
| 18 | F | 23 | (Australia) Bruce Lynton | (Australia) Bruce Lynton (Australia) Beric Lynton (Australia) Jamie Cartwright (Australia) Matthew Jackson | BMW M3-R | 431 | 23 |
| 18 | F | 23 | (Australia) Bruce Lynton | (Australia) Bruce Lynton (Australia) Beric Lynton (Australia) Jamie Cartwright (Australia) Matthew Jackson | BMW M50 3.0L I6 | 431 | 23 |
| 19 | F | 18 | (Australia) Amin Chahda | (Australia) Amin Chahda (Australia) Andrew Gillespie (Australia) Brett McFarland | Ford Falcon EL XR8 | 427 | 33 |
| 19 | F | 18 | (Australia) Amin Chahda | (Australia) Amin Chahda (Australia) Andrew Gillespie (Australia) Brett McFarland | Ford Windsor 5.0L V8 | 427 | 33 |
| 20 | E | 95 | (Australia) John McIlroy | (Australia) John McIlroy (Australia) Ken Douglas (Australia) Chris Stillwell (Australia) Phil Kirkham | Ford Falcon BA XR6T | 427 | 39 |
| 20 | E | 95 | (Australia) John McIlroy | (Australia) John McIlroy (Australia) Ken Douglas (Australia) Chris Stillwell (Australia) Phil Kirkham | Ford Barra 4.0L Turbo I6 | 427 | 39 |
| 21 | E | 31 | (Australia) Osborne Motorsport | (Australia) Stephen Borness (Australia) Ash Samadi (Australia) David Ratcliff (Australia) Andrew Bretherton | Toyota Celica SX | 424 | 45 |
| 21 | E | 31 | (Australia) Osborne Motorsport | (Australia) Stephen Borness (Australia) Ash Samadi (Australia) David Ratcliff (Australia) Andrew Bretherton | Toyota 2ZZ-GE 1.8L I4 | 424 | 45 |
| 22 | F | 37 | (Australia) Donut King Racing | (Australia) Peter Leemhuis (Australia) Shane Brangwin (Australia) Tony Alford (Australia) John Grounds | Mitsubishi Mirage | 421 | 38 |
| 22 | F | 37 | (Australia) Donut King Racing | (Australia) Peter Leemhuis (Australia) Shane Brangwin (Australia) Tony Alford (Australia) John Grounds | Mitsubishi 1.5L I4 | 421 | 38 |
| 23 | B | 4 | (United Kingdom) Sterling Motorsport | (United Kingdom) VJ Angelo (Australia) Ric Shaw (Australia) Mark Williamson (New Zealand) Scott O'Donnell | BMW M Coupe | 419 | 17 |
| 23 | B | 4 | (United Kingdom) Sterling Motorsport | (United Kingdom) VJ Angelo (Australia) Ric Shaw (Australia) Mark Williamson (New Zealand) Scott O'Donnell | BMW M54 3.2L I6 | 419 | 17 |
| 24 | F | 42 | (New Zealand) Barrie Thomlinson Motorsport | (New Zealand) Barrie Thomlinson (New Zealand) Barrie Thomlinson Jr. (New Zealand) Andrew Neale (New Zealand) Mike Eady | Toyota Altezza | 411 | 30 |
| 24 | F | 42 | (New Zealand) Barrie Thomlinson Motorsport | (New Zealand) Barrie Thomlinson (New Zealand) Barrie Thomlinson Jr. (New Zealand) Andrew Neale (New Zealand) Mike Eady | Toyota 3S-GE 2.0L I4 | 411 | 30 |
| 25 | B | 11 | (Australia) Motorsport Innovations | (Australia) Richard Wilson (Australia) Theo Koundouris (United States) Paul Jenkins (Australia) Ian Palmer | Ferrari 360 Modena | 392 | 25 |
| 25 | B | 11 | (Australia) Motorsport Innovations | (Australia) Richard Wilson (Australia) Theo Koundouris (United States) Paul Jenkins (Australia) Ian Palmer | Ferrari 3.6L V8 | 392 | 25 |
| 26 | E | 62 | (Australia) Scott Loadsman | (Australia) Scott Loadsman (Australia) David Russell (Australia) Ian Luff (Australia) Warren Luff | Holden Commodore VY SS | 382 | 35 |
| 26 | E | 62 | (Australia) Scott Loadsman | (Australia) Scott Loadsman (Australia) David Russell (Australia) Ian Luff (Australia) Warren Luff | Chevrolet LS1 5.7L V8 | 382 | 35 |
| 27 | E | 45 | (Australia) Allan Shephard | (Australia) Allan Shephard (Australia) Martin Bailey (Australia) Greg Doyle | Honda Integra Type-R | 380 | 44 |
| 27 | E | 45 | (Australia) Allan Shephard | (Australia) Allan Shephard (Australia) Martin Bailey (Australia) Greg Doyle | Honda B18C 1.8L I4 | 380 | 44 |
| 28 | D | 44 | (Australia) MGC Racing | (Australia) Mark Cohen (New Zealand) Fabian Coulthard (Australia) Geoff Emery (Australia) Tony Blanche | HSV VX GTS 300 | 336 | 31 |
| 28 | D | 44 | (Australia) MGC Racing | (Australia) Mark Cohen (New Zealand) Fabian Coulthard (Australia) Geoff Emery (Australia) Tony Blanche | Chevrolet LS1 5.7L V8 | 336 | 31 |
| 29 | D | 200 | (Australia) Haysom Motorsport | (Australia) Greg Haysom (Australia) Rodney Woods (Australia) Michael Robinson (Australia) Graham Hunt | Nissan 200SX Spec-R | 290 | 40 |
| 29 | D | 200 | (Australia) Haysom Motorsport | (Australia) Greg Haysom (Australia) Rodney Woods (Australia) Michael Robinson (Australia) Graham Hunt | Nissan SR20DET 2.0L Turbo I4 | 290 | 40 |
| 30 | A | 70 | (United Kingdom) Graham Nash Motorsport | (United Kingdom) Mike Newton (Brazil) Thomas Erdos (Austria) Manfred Jurasz (Australia) Rod Wilson | Porsche 996 GT3-RS | 280 | 11 |
| 30 | A | 70 | (United Kingdom) Graham Nash Motorsport | (United Kingdom) Mike Newton (Brazil) Thomas Erdos (Austria) Manfred Jurasz (Australia) Rod Wilson | Porsche 3.6L Flat-6 | 280 | 11 |
| 31 | D | 17 | (Australia) Team GT | (Australia) Trevor Haines (Australia) John Falk (Australia) James Phillip (Australia) Trevor Sheumack | FPV BA GT | 232 | 29 |
| 31 | D | 17 | (Australia) Team GT | (Australia) Trevor Haines (Australia) John Falk (Australia) James Phillip (Australia) Trevor Sheumack | Ford Modular 5.4L V8 | 232 | 29 |
| 32 | D | 222 | (Australia) Haysom Motorsport | (Australia) Hugh Harrison (Australia) Richard Catchlove (Australia) Mike Kirkpatrick (Australia) Damian Johnson | Nissan 200SX Spec-R | 125 | 34 |
| 32 | D | 222 | (Australia) Haysom Motorsport | (Australia) Hugh Harrison (Australia) Richard Catchlove (Australia) Mike Kirkpatrick (Australia) Damian Johnson | Nissan SR20DET 2.0L Turbo I4 | 125 | 34 |
| 33 | F | 301 | (Australia) SAE Racing | (Australia) Alan Gurr (Australia) Luke Searle (Malaysia) Alex Yoong (Australia) Geoff Full | BMW 320i | 50 | 14 |
| 33 | F | 301 | (Australia) SAE Racing | (Australia) Alan Gurr (Australia) Luke Searle (Malaysia) Alex Yoong (Australia) Geoff Full | BMW S14 2.0L I4 | 50 | 14 |
| DNF | A | 888 | (Australia) Prancing Horse Racing Scuderia | (Australia) Des Wall (Australia) Will Power (Australia) Paul Freestone (Australia) James Koundouris | Porsche 996 GT3-RS | 474 | 13 |
| DNF | A | 888 | (Australia) Prancing Horse Racing Scuderia | (Australia) Des Wall (Australia) Will Power (Australia) Paul Freestone (Australia) James Koundouris | Porsche 3.6L Flat-6 | 474 | 13 |
| DNF | E | 28 | (Australia) Ross Palmer Motorsport | (Australia) Anton Mechtler (Australia) Charlie Kovacs (Australia) James Brock (Australia) Mark Brame | Honda S2000 | 411 | 37 |
| DNF | E | 28 | (Australia) Ross Palmer Motorsport | (Australia) Anton Mechtler (Australia) Charlie Kovacs (Australia) James Brock (Australia) Mark Brame | Honda F20C 2.0L I4 | 411 | 37 |
| DNF | E | 156 | (Australia) GTA Motorsport | (Australia) Andrew Leithhead (Australia) Peter Doulman (Australia) Keith Downie (Australia) Keen Booker | Alfa Romeo 156 GTA | 353 | 42 |
| DNF | E | 156 | (Australia) GTA Motorsport | (Australia) Andrew Leithhead (Australia) Peter Doulman (Australia) Keith Downie (Australia) Keen Booker | Alfa Romeo 3.2L V6 | 353 | 42 |
| DNF | A | 24 | (United Kingdom) Cirtek Motorsport | (United Kingdom) Tim Harvey (United Kingdom) Jonathan Rowland (Germany) Hermann Tilke (Australia) Melinda Price | Porsche 996 GT3-RS | 325 | 12 |
| DNF | A | 24 | (United Kingdom) Cirtek Motorsport | (United Kingdom) Tim Harvey (United Kingdom) Jonathan Rowland (Germany) Hermann Tilke (Australia) Melinda Price | Porsche 3.6L Flat-6 | 325 | 12 |
| DNF | A | 48 | (Austria) BE Racing | (Australia) David Brabham (Austria) Klaus Engelhorn (Italy) Andrea Montermini (Austria) Philipp Peter | Ferrari 360 N-GT | 287 | 7 |
| DNF | A | 48 | (Austria) BE Racing | (Australia) David Brabham (Austria) Klaus Engelhorn (Italy) Andrea Montermini (Austria) Philipp Peter | Ferrari 3.6L V8 | 287 | 7 |
| DNF | D | 57 | (Australia) Graham Alexander | (Australia) Graham Alexander (Australia) John Woodberry (Australia) Brett Youlden (Australia) Bob Hughes | Mitsubishi Lancer RS-E Evo VII | 186 | 20 |
| DNF | D | 57 | (Australia) Graham Alexander | (Australia) Graham Alexander (Australia) John Woodberry (Australia) Brett Youlden (Australia) Bob Hughes | Mitsubishi 4G63 2.0L Turbo I4 | 186 | 20 |
| DNF | A | 420 | (Australia) Prancing Horse Racing Scuderia | (Australia) John Bowe (Australia) Neil Crompton (Australia) Greg Crick (Indonesia) Maher Algadrie | BMW M3 GTR | 131 | 3 |
| DNF | A | 420 | (Australia) Prancing Horse Racing Scuderia | (Australia) John Bowe (Australia) Neil Crompton (Australia) Greg Crick (Indonesia) Maher Algadrie | BMW N62 5.0L V8 | 131 | 3 |
| DNF | B | 66 | (United Kingdom) Adam Sharpe Motorsport | (New Zealand) Neil Cunningham (United Kingdom) Adam Sharpe (United Kingdom) Keith Ahlers (United Kingdom) Tom Shrimpton | Morgan Aero 8 | 97 | 15 |
| DNF | B | 66 | (United Kingdom) Adam Sharpe Motorsport | (New Zealand) Neil Cunningham (United Kingdom) Adam Sharpe (United Kingdom) Keith Ahlers (United Kingdom) Tom Shrimpton | BMW M62 4.6L V8 | 97 | 15 |
| DNF | D | 77 | (Australia) Nathan Pilkington | (Australia) Nathan Pilkington (Australia) Dennis Cribbin (Australia) Roland Hill (Australia) Ryan Hooker | Nissan 350Z | 65 | 27 |
| DNF | D | 77 | (Australia) Nathan Pilkington | (Australia) Nathan Pilkington (Australia) Dennis Cribbin (Australia) Roland Hill (Australia) Ryan Hooker | Nissan VQ35DE 3.5L V6 | 65 | 27 |
| DNF | D | 26 | (Australia) Novacastrian Motorsport | (Australia) Mark Westbrook (Australia) Wayne Moore (Australia) Ian Mitchell (Australia) Clayton Pyne | BMW M Coupe | 62 | 21 |
| DNF | D | 26 | (Australia) Novacastrian Motorsport | (Australia) Mark Westbrook (Australia) Wayne Moore (Australia) Ian Mitchell (Australia) Clayton Pyne | BMW M54 3.2L I6 | 62 | 21 |
| DNF | D | 75 | (Australia) Aaron McGill | (Australia) Aaron McGill (Australia) David Auger (Australia) Ross Halliday (Australia) Martin Miller | Nissan 200SX Spec-R | 42 | 41 |
| DNF | D | 75 | (Australia) Aaron McGill | (Australia) Aaron McGill (Australia) David Auger (Australia) Ross Halliday (Australia) Martin Miller | Nissan SR20DET 2.0L Turbo I4 | 42 | 41 |
| DNF | F | 40 | (Germany) Duller Motorsport | (United Kingdom) Frank Mountain (United Kingdom) Robert Brooks (New Zealand) Rob Wilson (United Kingdom) Daniel Gooding | BMW M3 | 25 | 24 |
| DNF | F | 40 | (Germany) Duller Motorsport | (United Kingdom) Frank Mountain (United Kingdom) Robert Brooks (New Zealand) Rob Wilson (United Kingdom) Daniel Gooding | BMW M52 3.2L I6 | 25 | 24 |

== Statistics ==
- Pole Position - #427 Garth Tander - 2:13.2856
- Fastest Lap - #427 Garth Tander - 2:14.4894 (lap 524)
- Average Speed - 136 km/h
