= Mosler MT900 =

American sports car

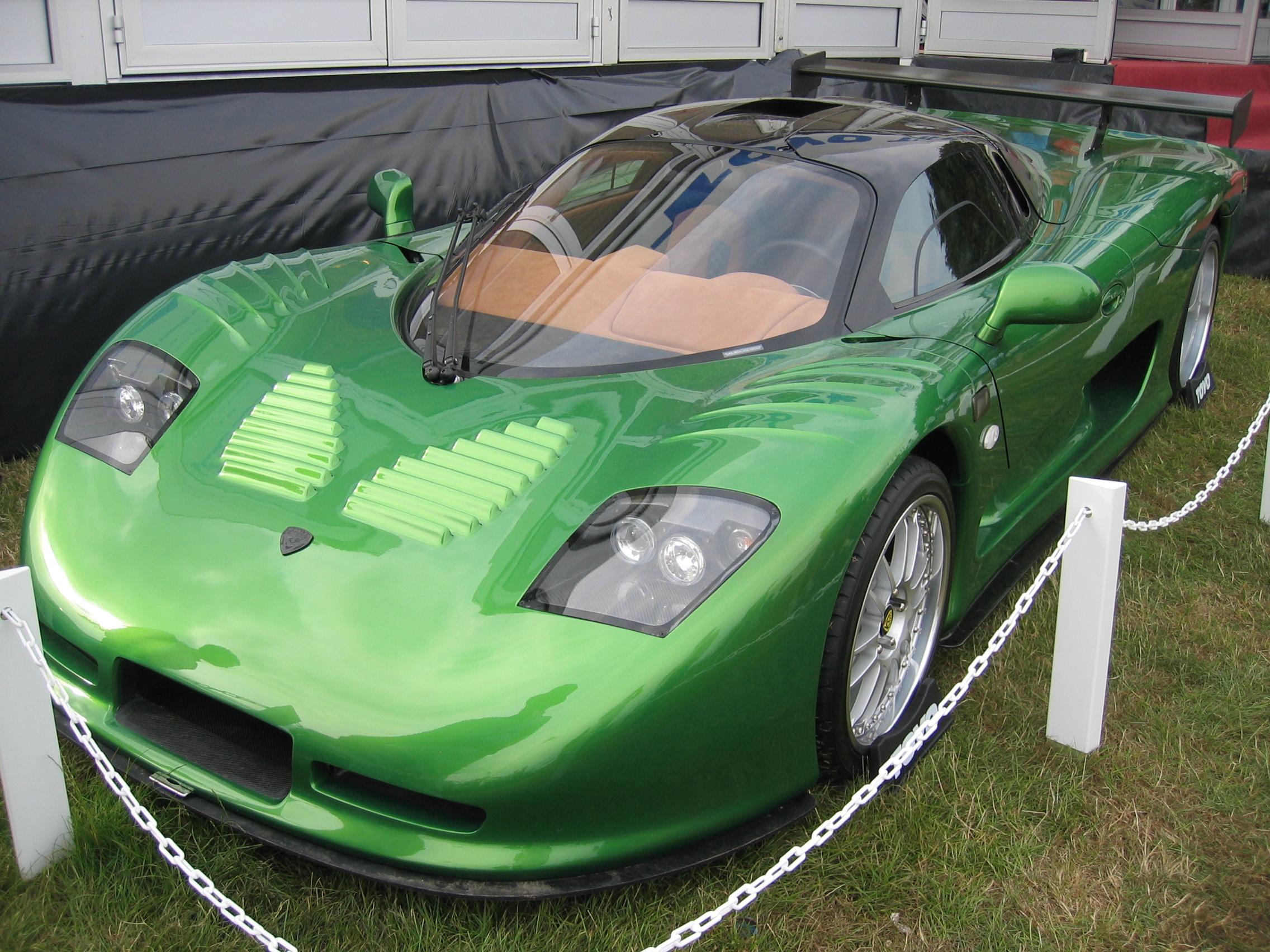

Overview
- Manufacturer: Mosler Automotive
- Production: 2001–2011
- Assembly: Florida, East Dereham (final assembly)
- Designer: Rod Trenne

Body and chassis
- Class: Sports car (S)
- Body style: 2-door coupé
- Layout: Rear mid-engine, rear-wheel-drive
- Doors: Butterfly

Powertrain
- Engine: 5.7 L LS1 V8; 7.0 L LS7 V8
- Transmission: ZF Friedrichshafen 6-speed manual transmission

Dimensions
- Wheelbase: 109 in (2,769 mm)
- Length: 189 in (4,801 mm)
- Width: 79 in (2,007 mm)
- Height: 44.5 in (1,130 mm)
- Curb weight: 1,488 lb (675 kg)

Chronology
- Predecessor: Mosler Raptor

The Mosler MT900 is a sports car built by American automotive manufacturer Mosler Automotive from 2001 to 2011.

Three submodels were produced. The MT900R was a racing version of the MT900. The basic car was updated as the MT900S for 2005, with the MT900S Photon being an optional performance package. The original MT900 was introduced in 2001 and the MT900S finished production in May 2011. Components for 25 MTs were produced as of January 2005, though only about 35 road cars and 50 racing versions have officially been completed (c.20 of which are MT900S). The MT900 was the replacement for the Mosler Raptor.

== MT900 ==
Mosler MT900
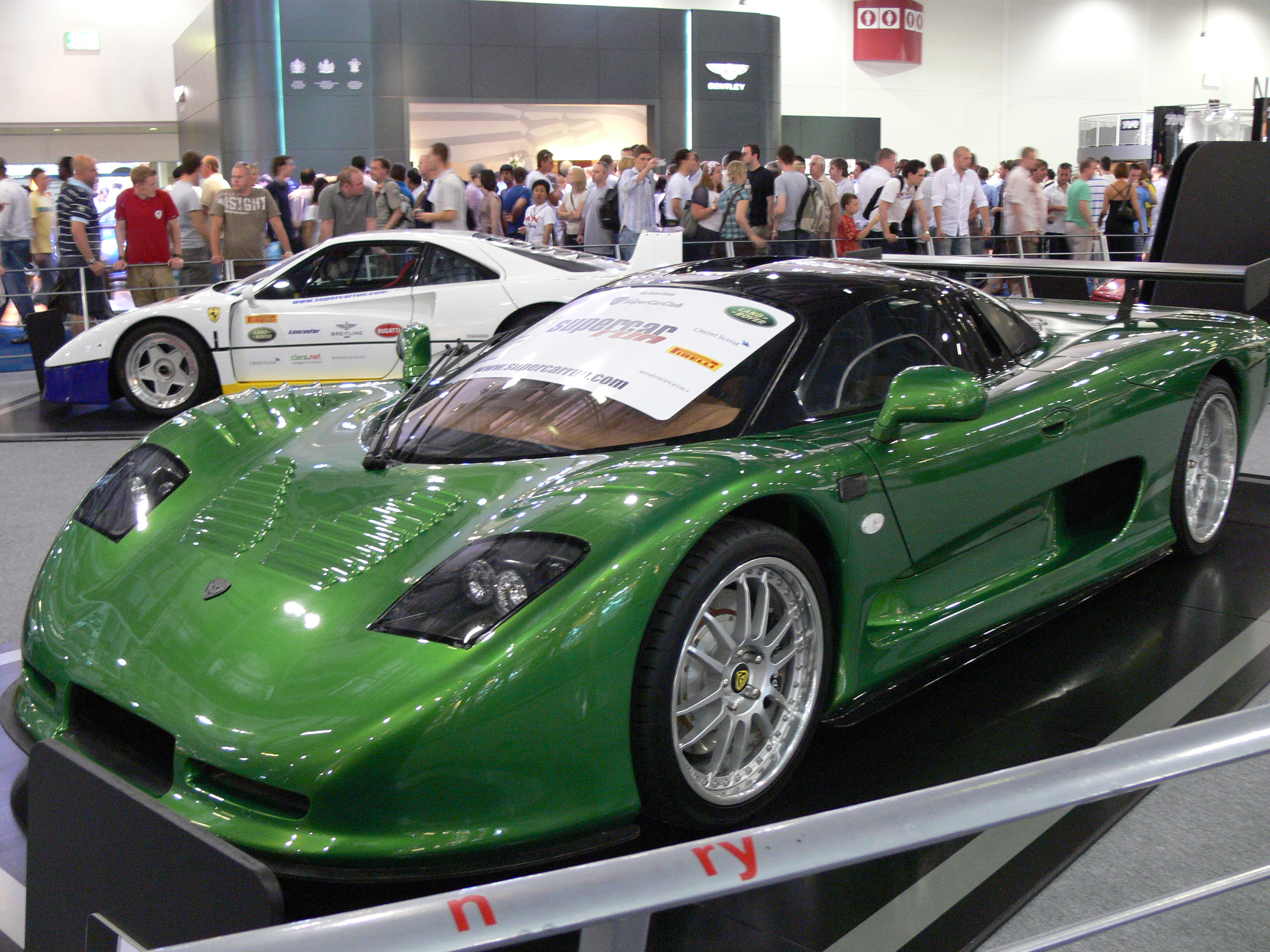

Overview
- Production: 2001; 1 produced

Powertrain
- Engine: 5.7 L LS6 V8

Dimensions
- Curb weight: 1,175 kg (2,590 lb)

The MT900 was designed by Rod Trenne, who previously worked on the Corvette C5. The initials were for Mosler, Trenne, and the car's 900 kg (1,984 lb) target weight.

The MT900 used a carbon-fiber chassis with a LS6 V8 engine mounted amidships, powering the rear wheels. Power output is 350 hp (261 kW), with 350 lb⋅ft (475 N⋅m) torque. A ZF transaxle, designed for Porsche, was mounted upside down to allow the engine to sit in front of the rear axle.

The original MT900 weighed 1,175 kg (2,590 lb), much more than the target weight, but could still accelerate to 60 mph (97 km/h) in 3.5 seconds according to Car and Driver. The MT900 they tested could also do a 12.0 second quarter mile at 118 mph (190 km/h), and they recorded a top speed of 150 mph (241 km/h), limited by the redline. The MT900 pulled 1.02 g on the skidpad. The U.S. Environmental Protection Agency (EPA) estimated 19 mpg_{‑US} (12 L/100 km; 23 mpg_{‑imp}) and 28 mpg_{‑US} (8.4 L/100 km; 34 mpg_{‑imp}) in city and highway driving, respectively.

The exterior was designed for aerodynamics, with a 0.25 coefficient of drag. List price was US$164,000. Only a single prototype was produced.

== MT900R ==
Mosler MT900R
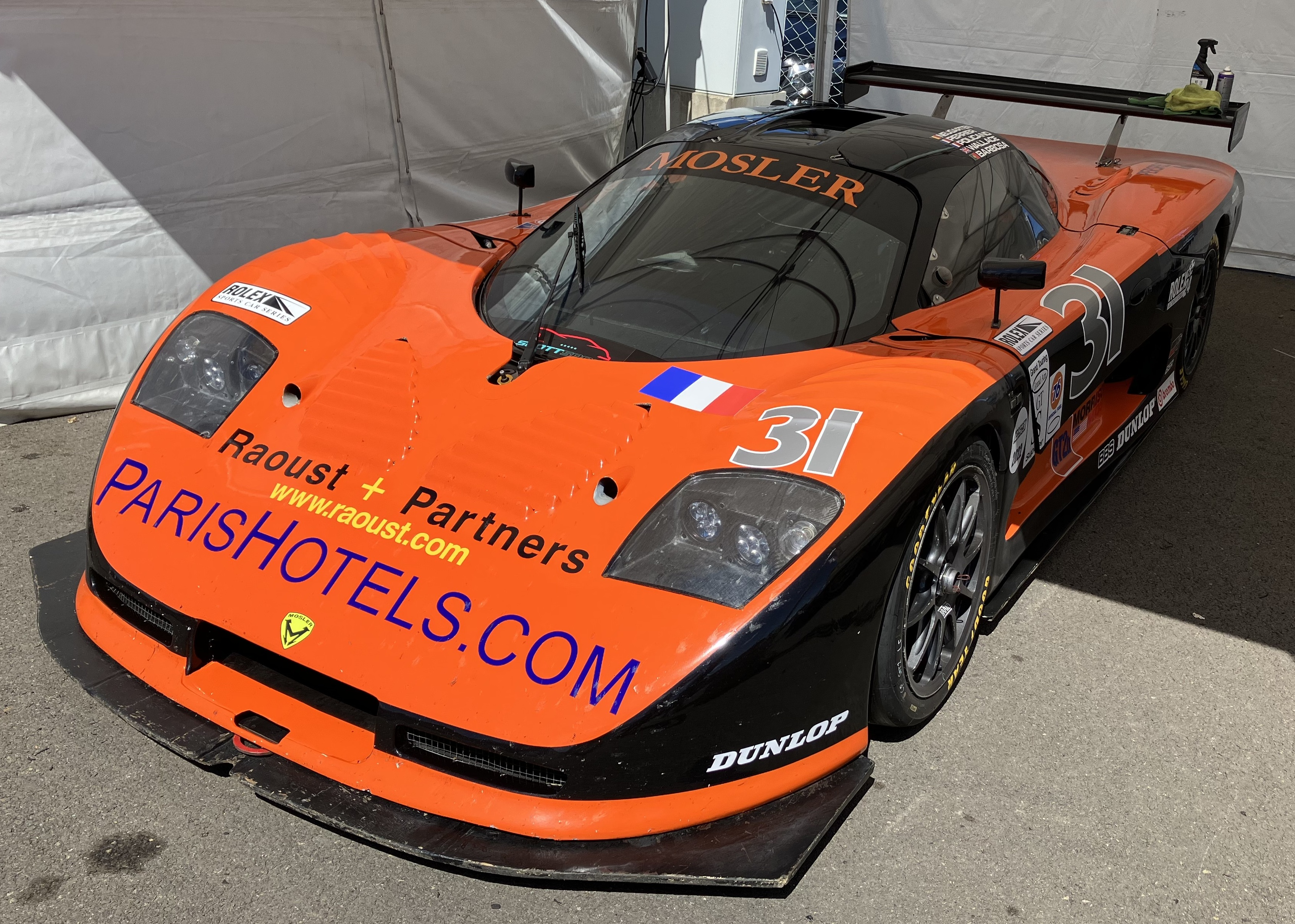
- MT900 R at the 2022 Le Mans Classic

Overview
- Production: 2001–2011; Approx. 30 produced

Powertrain
- Engine: 5.7 L LS1 V8

Dimensions
- Curb weight: 1,020 kg (2,250 lb)

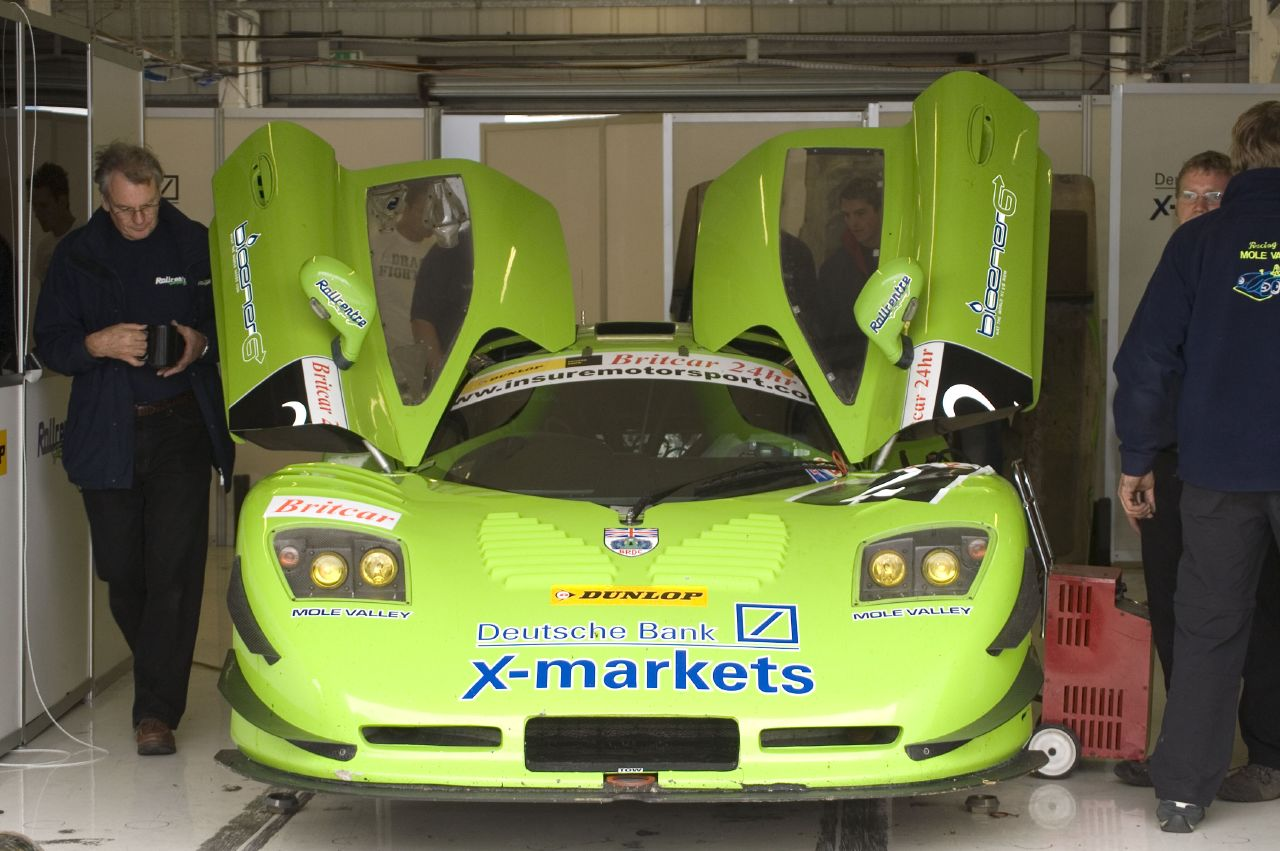
Mosler MT900R at the 2007 Britcar 24 Hours

Introduced at the same time as the basic MT900 was the race-ready MT900R. It was designed for use in various international motorsports series for an estimated price of $119,000. The MT900R made its competition debut at the 2001 24 Hours of Daytona, and would be campaigned by a factory Mosler team for the full season of the Grand American Road Racing Championship. The entry finished the year ninth in their class championship.

For 2002, the French Perspective Racing team would become the full-season entry in Grand American and saw an improvement in performance. At Daytona the MT900R finished 13th overall and fifth in their class before winning at the next round at Homestead-Miami Speedway, helping the team to third in the championship. Rollcentre Racing and Balfe Motorsport (with aid from Rollcentre) would bring the Moslers to Europe in 2003, starting the British GT Championship year strong with three straight one-two finishes, before finishing the year with four more victories. The Rollcentre squad edged out Balfe for the championship that year. In Grand American, the Moslers were moved to the faster GTS class, but Perspective Racing improved on the previous year's Daytona effort with a ninth-place finish and the class victory. Mosler Automotive would take one more victory that season.

Martin Short's Rollcentre Racing team also took their MT900R to a second-place finish in the inaugural Bathurst 24 Hour in 2002 at the famous Mount Panorama Circuit in Bathurst, Australia. Rollcentre backed this up in the 2003 race with a fifth-place finish. The MT900R proved very quick on the circuit's Mountain and Conrod Straight's (both over 1 km in length), with Short finding he was able to match the speed of the Holden Monaro 427C's which used an Australian developed version of the larger 7.0L (427cui) V8 engine used in the Chevrolet Corvette C5-R's at Le Mans, as well as the 6.0L V12 powered Lamborghini Diablo GTR.

Rollcentre and Balfe would continue in the British GT Championship in 2004, although Balfe would also enter the Spanish GT Championship. The Moslers would struggle in British GT and score no wins, but Balfe was able to earn two victories in Spanish GT, winning the drivers' championship by a mere point. 2005 would see Balfe entering the FIA GT Championship, although the car was not homologated and could not fight for points. Rollcentre would go on to win the Britcar 24 hours at Silverstone. Escuderia Bengala and Escuderia Motor Terrasa would compete in Spanish GT, while Eclipse Motorsport and Cadena GTC took over British GT competition.

=== MT900 GT3 ===
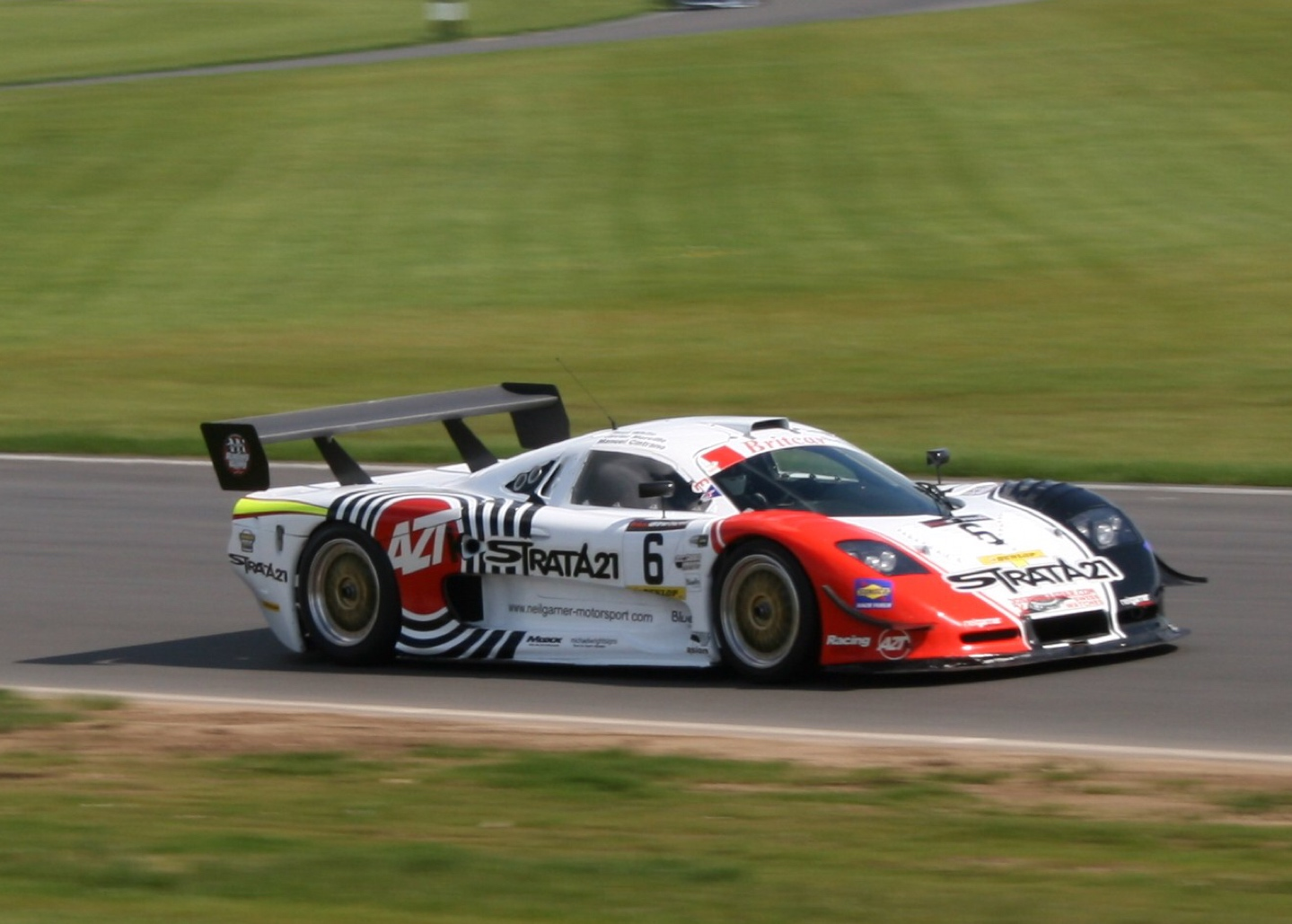
Mosler MT900R GT3

Launched in late 2006, the Mosler MT900 GT3 was an attempt by Rollcentre Racing to adapt the MT900R for compliance to the new FIA GT3 category used in various championships. However, the lack of production Moslers led to the FIA rejecting the homologation and forcing Rollcentre to turn elsewhere. The car was allowed into the International GT Open, Australian GT Championship and Belcar series along with the British GT championship which runs to GT3 rules, but has not been approved for other series which use the GT3 category.

MT900R GT3's use the 7.0L (427cui) LS7 V8 engine rather than the 5.7L (350cui) LS1 version from the original MT900R.

== MT900S ==
Mosler MT900S
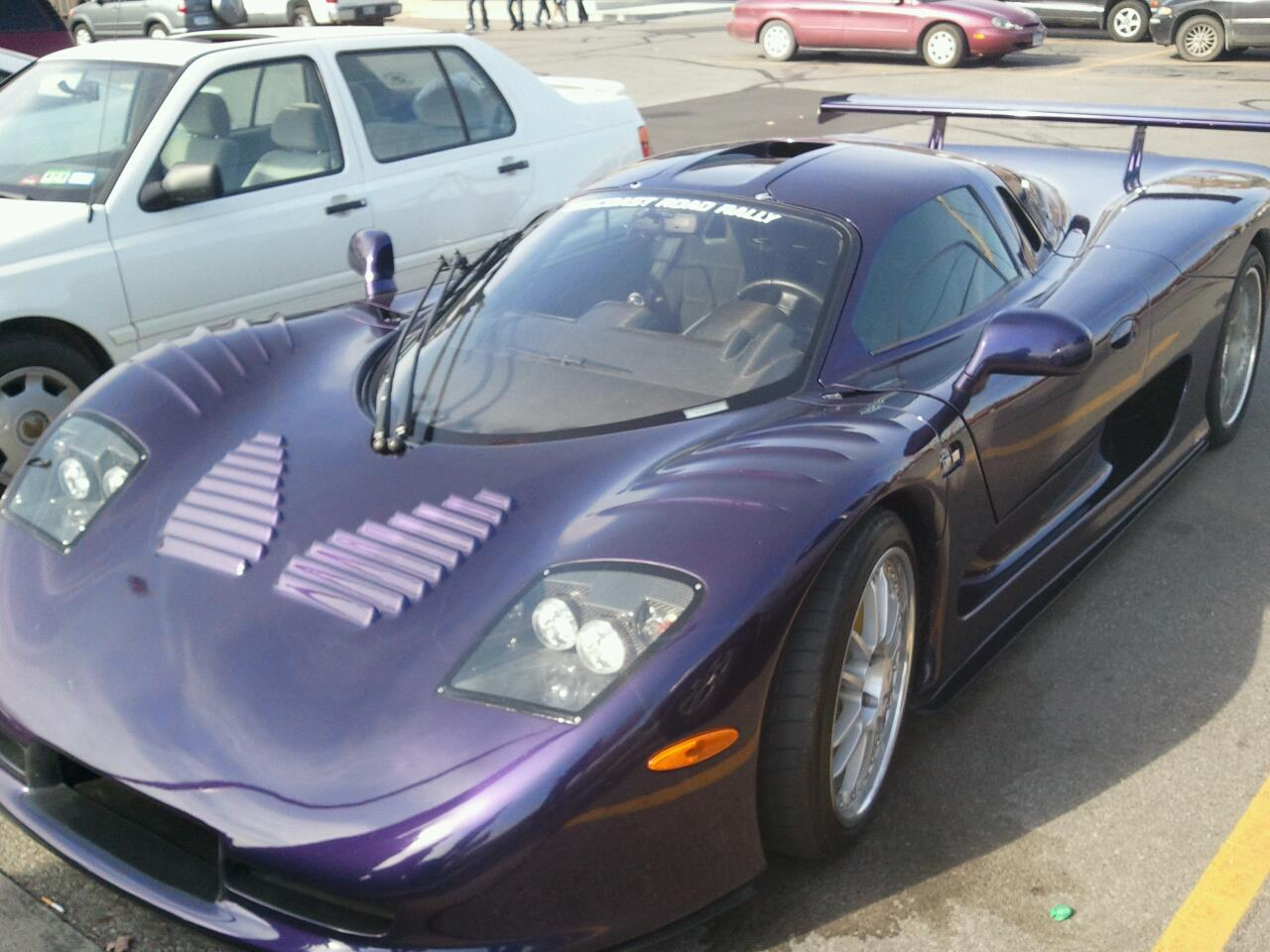

Overview
- Production: 2003–2010; 20 produced

Powertrain
- Engine: 2001–2006 5.7 L LS1 V8; 2007–2010 7.0 L LS7 V8

Dimensions
- Curb weight: 998 kg (2,200 lb)

The MT900 underwent several changes to become the MT900S, with 435 hp (324 kW) from its Corvette Z06-derived LS6 V8. The car weighs 998 kg (2,200 lb) without fuel.

An early prototype MT900S, despite being up 177 kg (390 lb) and down 65 hp (48 kW) from the production version, posted a 0-60 mph time of 3.5 seconds and a quarter-mile time of 12 seconds flat.

A newer edition with 600 bhp (447 kW) accelerated from 0 to 60 mph (0 to 97 km/h) in 3.1 seconds in a Car and Driver test in early 2006.

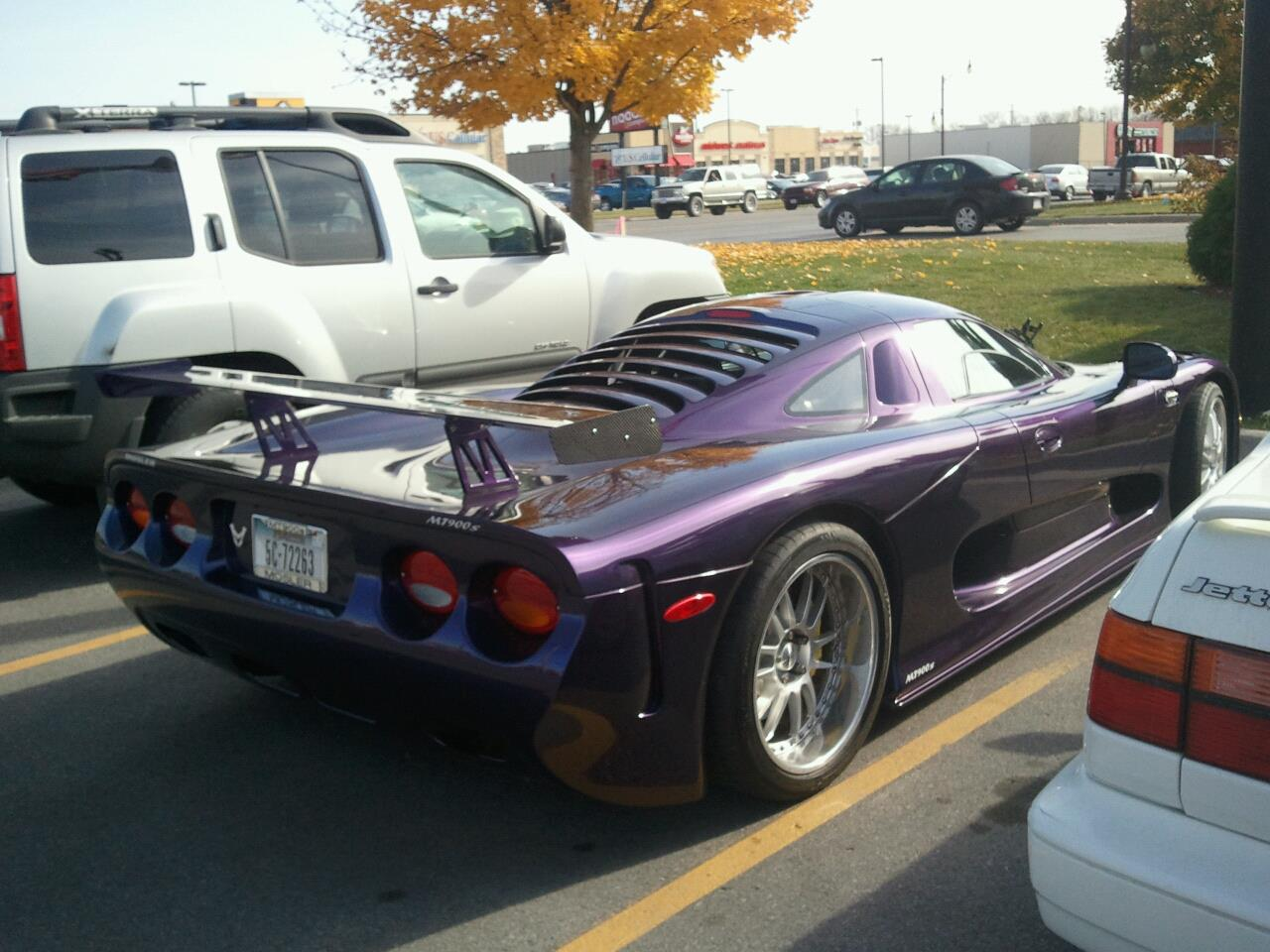
Mosler MT900S rear view

In June 2005, Mosler announced that they had reached EPA and California Air Resources Board (CARB) certification on the MT900S, allowing road car sales to begin in the United States. The price was set at $189,000 with two examples having been built as of January 2005. American filmmaker George Lucas took delivery of the first street-legal MT900S in December 2006.

== Photon ==
Mosler MT900S Photon

Overview
- Manufacturer: Mosler Automotive
- Production: 2003–2010; 2 produced (1 2003 and 1 2010)

Body and chassis
- Layout: Mid-engine Rear Drive

Powertrain
- Engine: 5.7 L LS6 V8 2003; 7.0 L LS7 V8 2010
- Transmission: Hewland 6-speed

Dimensions
- Curb weight: 898 kg (1,980 lb)

A MT900S Photon variant is available which adds a Hewland transmission, thinwall subframes, Dymag carbon fiber magnesium wheels, titanium springs, and carbon fiber seats and bodywork, reducing the car's weight to just under its initial target at 898 kg (1,980 lb). As of January, 2011, a second Photon had been built and was sold for use in the United Kingdom.

== MT900SGT ==
Mosler MT900SGT

Overview
- Production: none built

Powertrain
- Engine: 7.0 L LS7 V8

Dimensions
- Curb weight: 1,080 kg (2,381 lb)

In 2010, Mosler announced that they would release a facelifted version of MT900, based on the MT900M which participated in 2010 Super GT season. A 3D rendering of the facelifted MT900 was released, but that was as far as the redesign progressed. In May 2011 production was stopped and the factory closed down.

== MT900M ==
Mosler MT900M
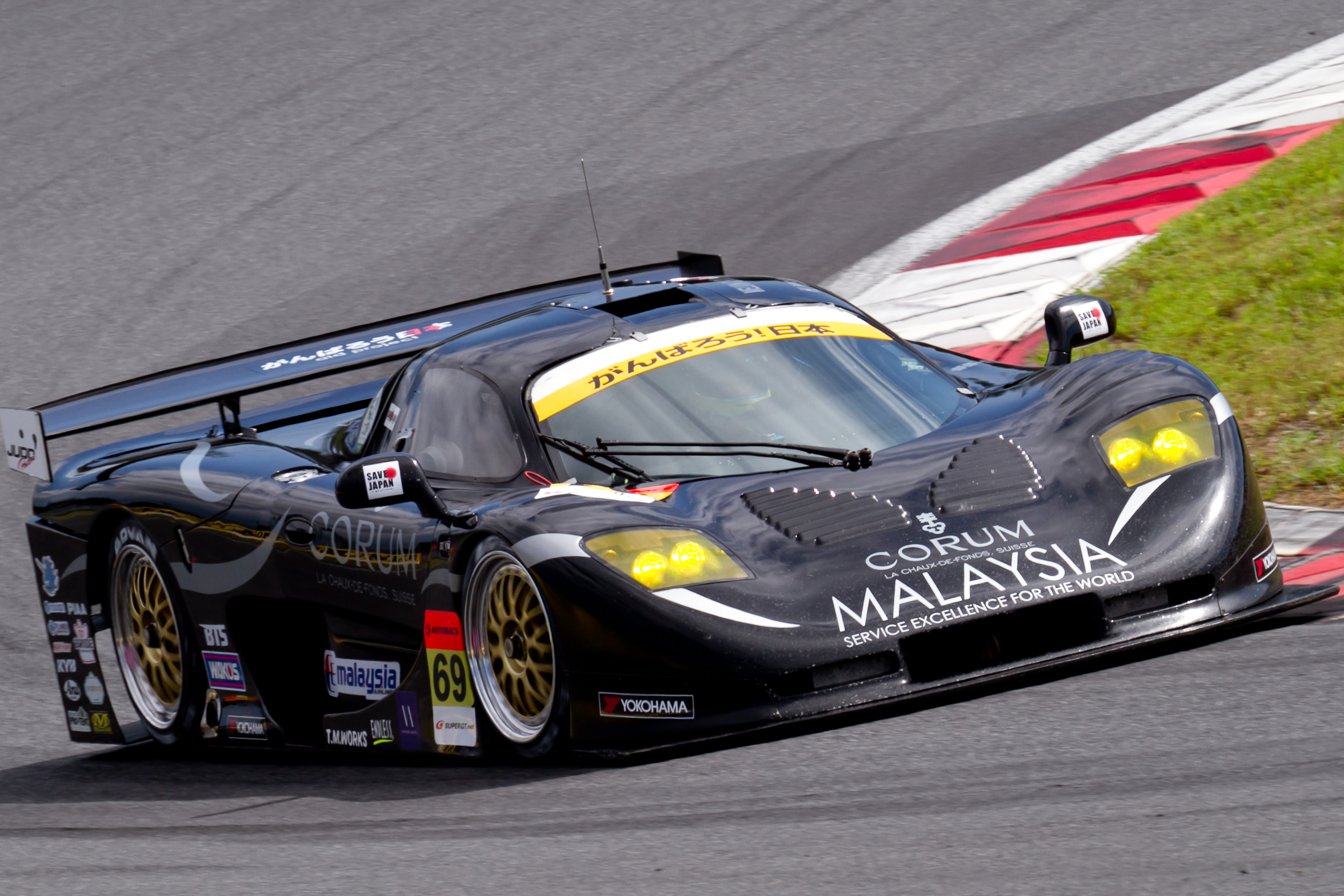

Overview
- Production: 2010–2011

Powertrain
- Engine: 3.4 L Judd XV V8

Dimensions
- Curb weight: 1,080 kg (2,381 lb)

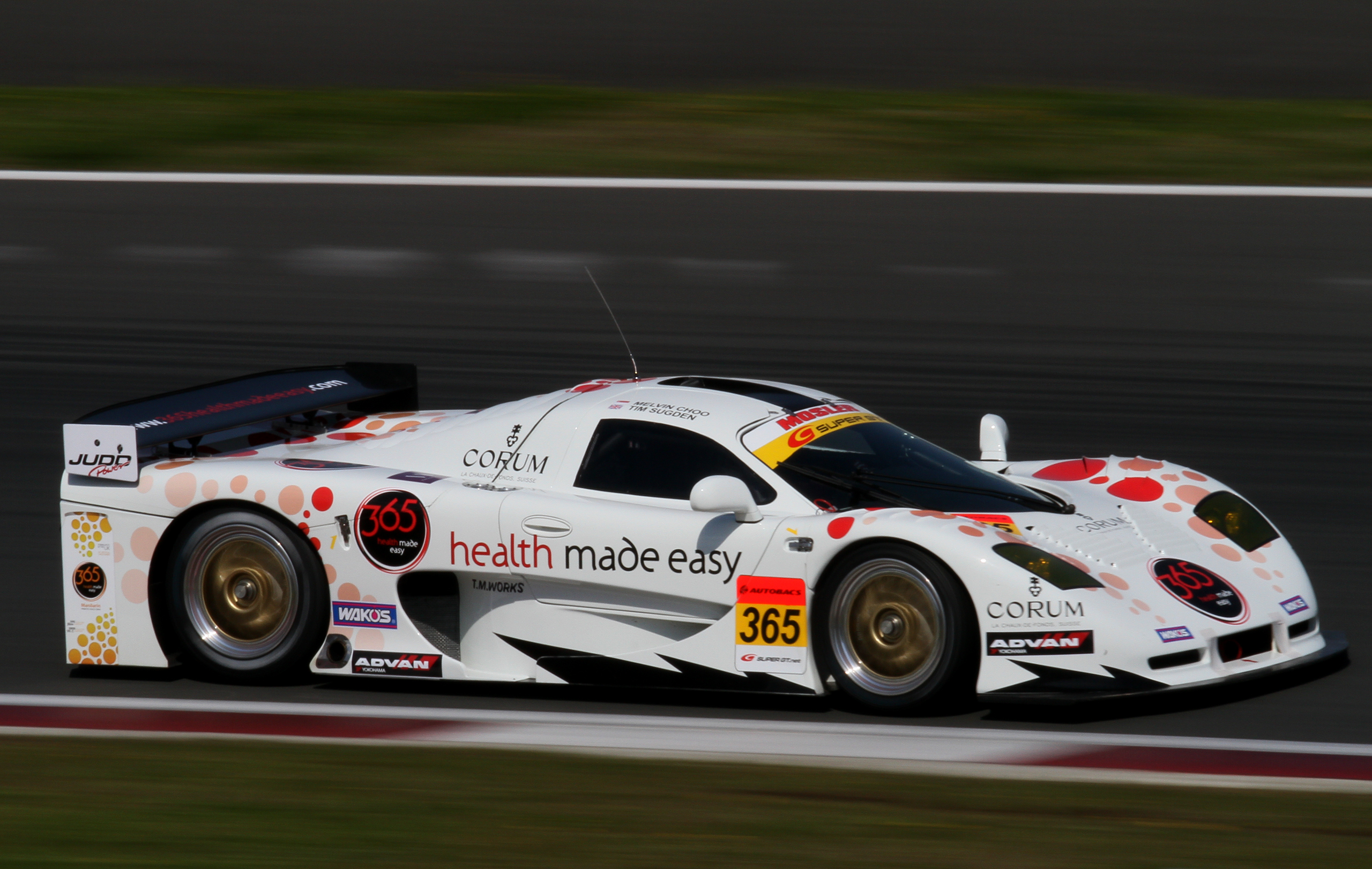
Mosler MT900M GT300 car at the 2010 Fuji GT 400km

In 2010 Super GT season, the MT900M made its debut at the second round of the season in Okayama by Thunder Asia Racing, a GT300 team based in Singapore. Unlike the other MT900 entered in previous Super GT seasons, it uses a 3.4-liter V8 Judd engine and an aero kit specified for the GT300 class regulations. Some iterations used a 3.5-litre version of the Judd XV675 V8.

== General and cited references ==
- Neil, Dan (March 2001). "Mosler MT900 Preview". Car and Driver. 46 (9): 34–40.
- Thursby, Ray (March 2003). "No Quarter". Sports Car International (155): 40–44.
- "Mosler MT 900 Supercar Comes To America". Motor Trend. June 17, 2005.
