= BMW M Coupé and Roadster =

High performance variants of the BMW Z3 and Z4 coupé and roadster

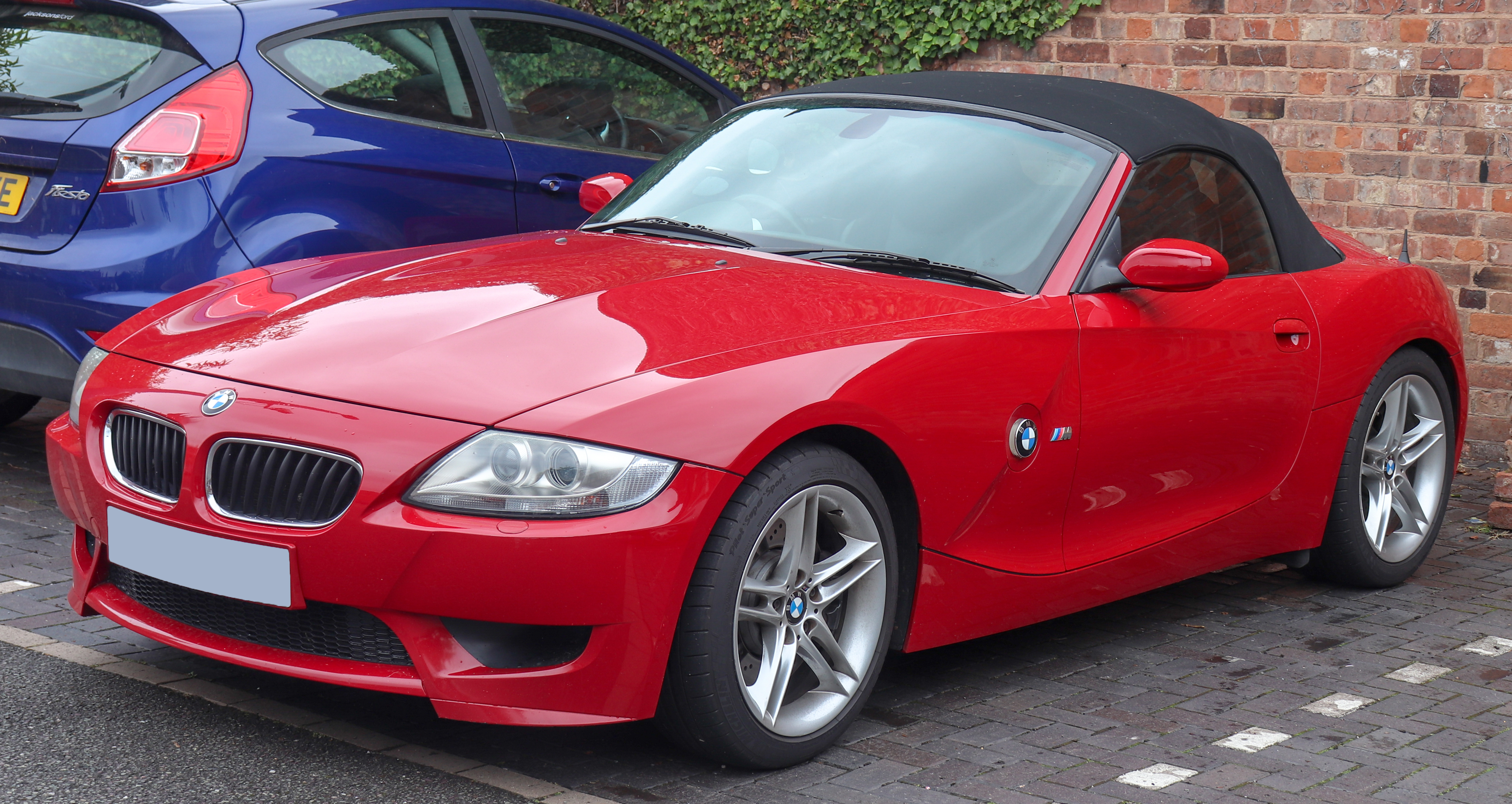
2006–2008 Z4 M Roadster

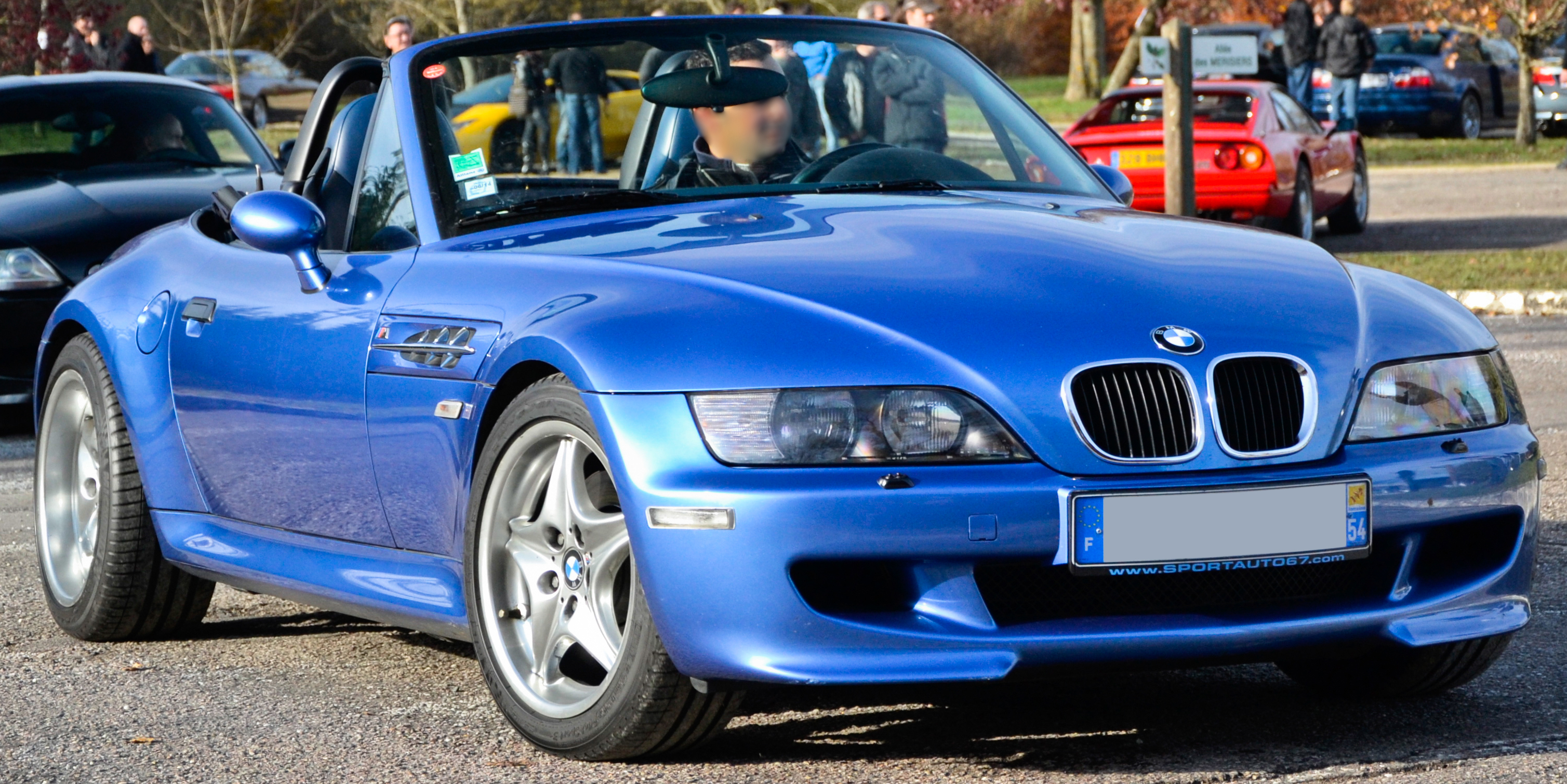
1998–2002 Z3 M Roadster

The BMW M Coupé and BMW M Roadster are high performance models of the BMW Z3 and Z4 coupés/roadsters produced by BMW M. The first generation was based on the Z3 and was produced between 1998 and 2002. The second generation was based on the Z4 and was produced between 2006 and 2008.

All models were produced in the BMW Spartanburg plant in the United States. Some major components— such as the engine and transmission— were imported from Germany.

== First generation (1997–2002) ==
BMW Z3 M Coupé (E36/8) BMW Z3 M Roadster (E36/7)
- M Coupé

Overview
- Production: 1997–2002
- Designer: Marcus Syring

Body and chassis
- Class: Sports car (S)
- Body style: 2-door coupé (E36/8); 2-door roadster (E36/7)
- Layout: FR layout
- Related: BMW Z3

Powertrain
- Engine: 3.2 L S50/S52/S54 I6
- Transmission: 5-speed manual

Dimensions
- Wheelbase: 2,459 mm (96.8 in)
- Length: 4,025 mm (158.5 in)
- Width: 1,740 mm (68.5 in)
- Height: 1,306 mm (51.4 in)
- Curb weight: 1,420 kg (3,131 lb)

=== Z3 M Roadster ===
Z3 M Roadster

The M-Roadster E36/7 was introduced in 1997 as the high performance version of the BMW Z3. The most significant cosmetic difference between the M-Roadster, including the M-Coupe, is the substantially flared rear quarter-panels ("fender flares") and the correspondingly offset rear wheels. Additional external differences compared to the standard Z3 models included front and rear bumpers, gills, quad exhaust, trunk, and mirrors.

The standard Z3 models received a facelift in 1999. The appearance of the M was not changed

In the 6 years from 1997 to 2002, 15,322 M Roadsters were produced.

The M Roadster is electronically limited to a top speed of 250 km/h (155 mph). The curb weight is 1,420 kg (3,130.6 lb).

=== M Coupé ===
M Coupé

The M Coupé E36/8, manufactured from 1998 until 2002, was developed under the leadership of engineer Burkhard Göschel with the intention of adding increased torsional and structural rigidity to the Z3 roadster's chassis. The development team had a hard time convincing the board of directors to approve the model for production, but it was eventually given the green light as long as it remained cost-effective to produce. To achieve this goal, majority of the body panels had to be shared with the M roadster, thus the doors and everything from the A-pillar forward are interchangeable between the coupé and roadster, as are most interior parts. The Z3 Coupé, which combines the M Coupé's body with the standard Z3 drivetrain, chassis, and cosmetics, was approved for production at the same time.

The small development cost allocated to the Z3M dictated a small marketing budget, and using the cheaper five speed ZF gearbox, not the more expensive Getrag S6S-420G 6 speed. The five speed gearbox dictated longer differential ratios to ensure lower rpm cruising, and the later S54 engined cars were detuned to ensure performance parity with the heavier E46 M3. As a result of their relative rarity the M Coupés have become investable (especially S54 engined models). The M Coupé powered by the S54 engine is one of the lowest production BMWs with only 1,112 built in total for all markets. The Z3 Coupé was given the nickname "clown shoe" because of its distinctive styling.

=== Engines ===
The M Coupe and M Roadster were initially powered by the engines from the E36 M3. This means that most countries initially used the 3.2 L version of the BMW S50 engine, while North American models initially used the less powerful BMW S52 engine. The S50 is rated at 236 kW (316 hp) at 7,400 rpm and 350 N⋅m (258 lb⋅ft) at 3,250 rpm, while the S52 engine is rated at 179 kW (240 hp) at 6,000 rpm and 320 N⋅m (236 lb⋅ft) at 3,800 rpm. A total of 2,999 cars were built with the S50 engine and 2,180 cars were built with the S52 engine.

Starting in February 2001, the engines were upgraded to the BMW S54 engine from the E46 M3. In most countries, it is rated at 239 kW (321 hp) at 7,400 rpm and 354 N⋅m (261 lb⋅ft) at 4,900 rpm, while North American models have 235 kW (315 bhp) at 7,400 rpm and 341 N⋅m (252 lb⋅ft) at 4,900 rpm. The difference in peak power and torque is due to the catalytic converters being located closer to the engine on the North American spec cars, which allows the catalysts to heat up faster and reduce cold start emissions. 678 M Coupes were made for the American market, with a total of 1,112 M Coupes built with the S54 engine worldwide.

=== Color options ===
The M Coupé had the following OEM color options: Alpine White III, Imola Red II, Dakar Yellow II, Evergreen, Laguna Seca Blue, Cosmos Black, Black Sapphire Metallic, Arctic Silver Metallic, Titanium Silver Metallic, Estoril Blue Metallic, Boston Green Metallic, Oxford Green II Metallic, Steel Grey Metallic, Phoenix Yellow Metallic.

=== Transmission ===
The gearbox is a ZF Type C 5-speed manual. The final drive is either 3.23:1 (S52) or 3.15:1 (S50 and S54). A limited slip differential with a maximum locking of 25 percent is standard.

=== Chassis ===
Like all Z3 models, the M Coupe and M Roadster's suspension is made up of MacPherson struts in the front and semi-trailing arms in the rear. Compared to the six-cylinder Z3 roadster, however, the M roadster included modifications such as wider front and rear tracks (by 0.4 in (10.2 mm)), reduced ride height (by 1.1 in (27.9 mm)), modified front suspension geometry, firmer springs and shocks, thicker anti-roll bars, stronger semi-trailing arms and a reinforced subframe.

When the M roadster switched to the S54 engine (2/01 production), the chassis was upgraded to the stiffer springs and shocks developed for the M Coupé.

=== Brakes ===
The brakes from the E36 M3 were used: four-wheel vented discs measuring 12.4 in (315.0 mm) on the front and 12.3 in (312.4 mm) on the rear. In most countries, the front discs were a two-piece "floating rotor" design.

Unlike the US market where the two-piece floating rotor brakes were not available, the Canadian market cars were equipped with the floating discs.

=== Wheels and tyres ===
Front tyres were 225/45ZR17 and rear tyres were 245/40ZR17. The wheel sizes were 7.5x17-inch at the front and 9x17-inch at the rear. Early M coupes (S50 and S52 engines) had a silverly chromeline finish, whereas the later models (S54 engine) had a darker two stage Chrome Shadow finish also used on the E46 M3.

== Second generation (2006–2008) ==
BMW Z4 M Coupé (E86) BMW Z4 M Roadster (E85)
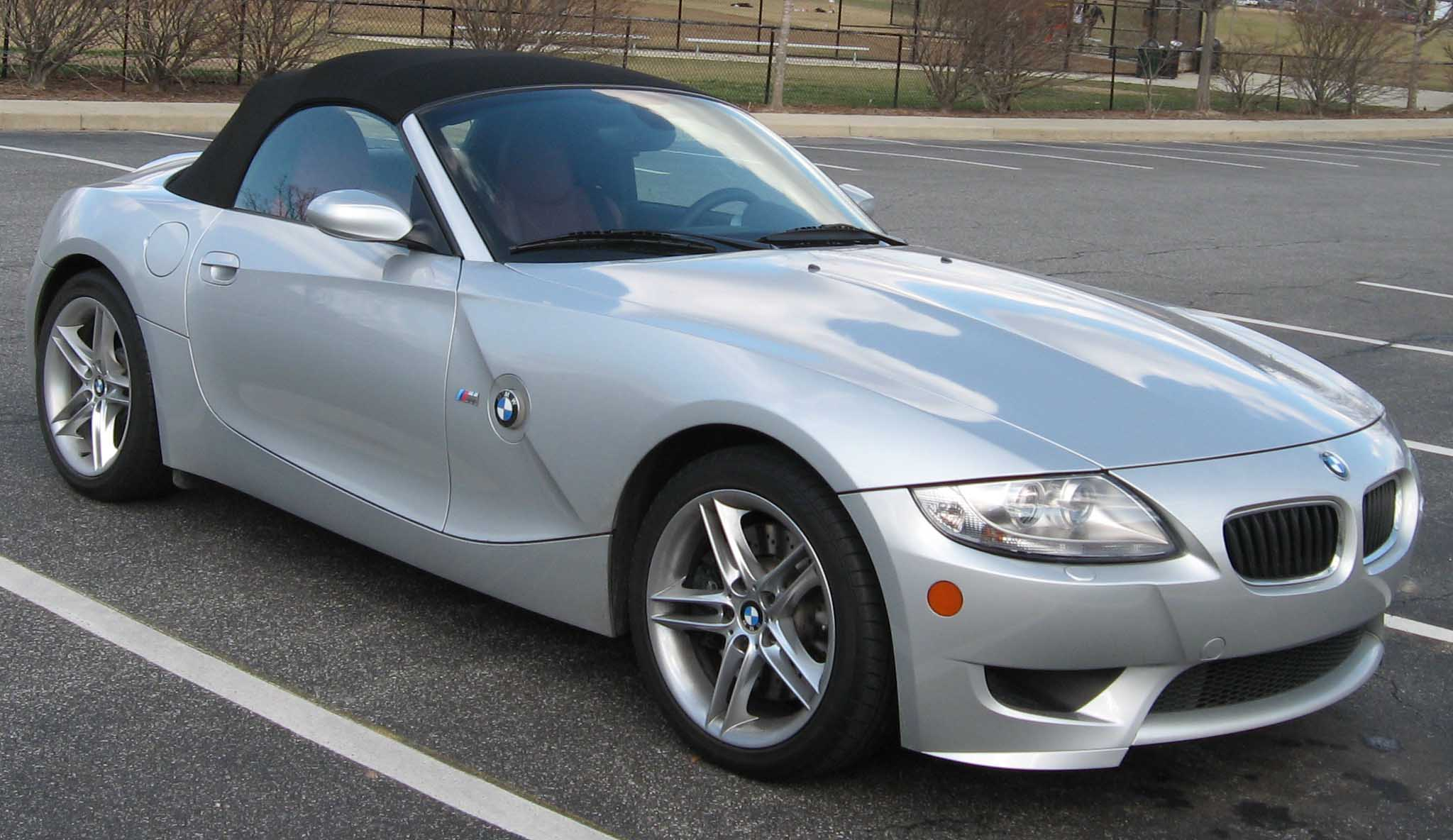
- Z4 M Roadster

Overview
- Production: 2006–2008
- Designer: Jan Hettler

Body and chassis
- Class: Sports car (S)
- Body style: 2-door coupé (E86); 2-door roadster (E85)
- Layout: Rear-wheel drive
- Related: BMW Z4 (E85)

Powertrain
- Engine: 3.2 L S54 I6
- Transmission: 6-speed manual

Dimensions
- Wheelbase: 2,495 mm (98.2 in)
- Length: 4,090 mm (161.0 in)
- Width: 1,780 mm (70.1 in)
- Height: 1,285 mm (50.6 in)
- Curb weight: 1,450–1,455 kg (3,197–3,208 lb)

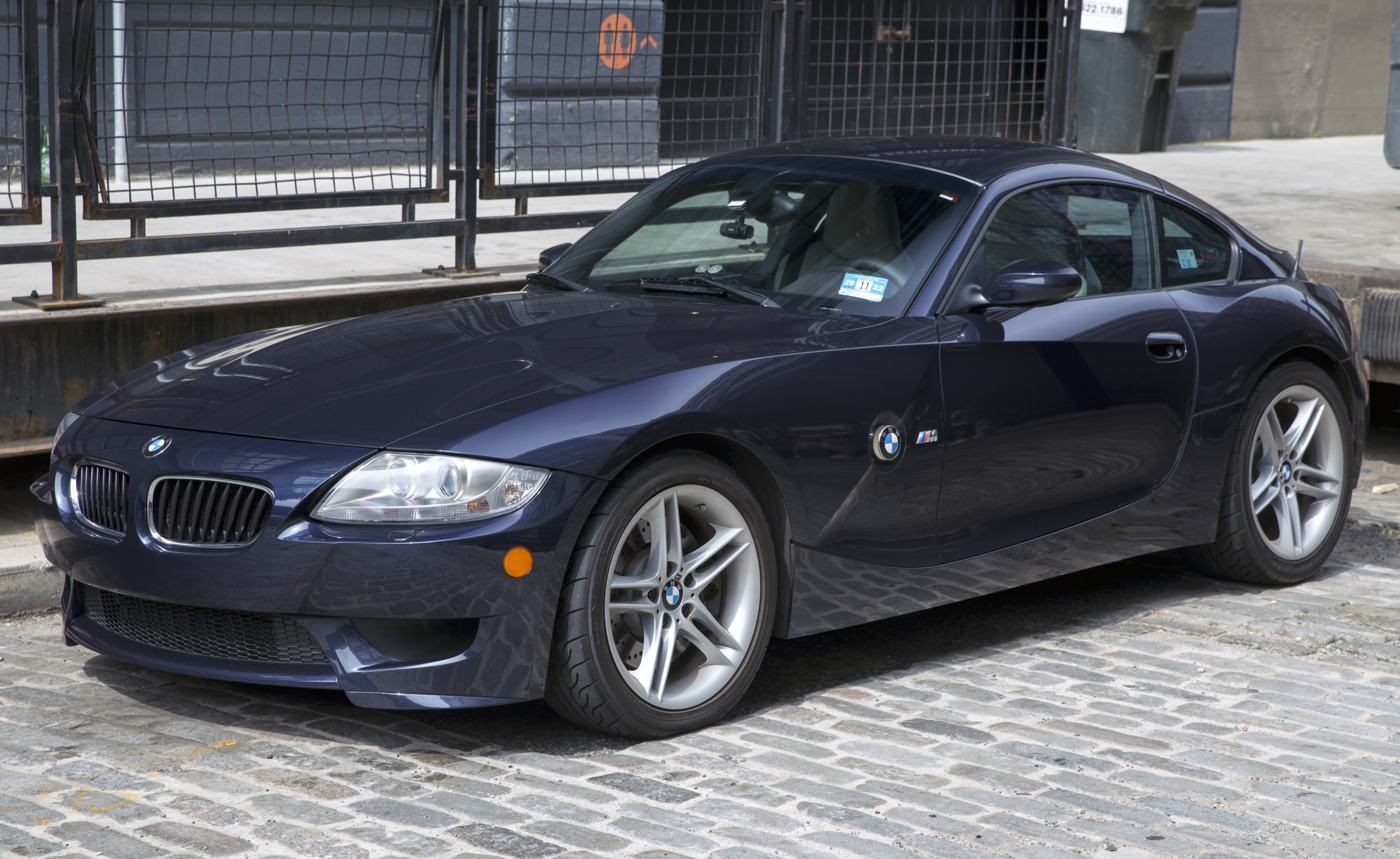
Z4 M Coupé

Z4 M Coupé

=== Z4 M Coupé ===
The coupé model was introduced to the public first in concept form at the 2005 Frankfurt Motor Show and then in production form at the 2006 Geneva International Motor Show with production starting shortly after.

The Z4 M Coupé has a fastback hatch design, resulting in a different body shape to its Z3 M Coupé predecessor. The roof and windows add an additional weight of 10–15 kg as compared to the roadster. BMW North America press kits report the Coupé's weight as 1,465 kg (3,230 lb) while other official BMW materials show a weight of 1,495 kg (3,296 lb).

The official 0–97 km/h (60 mph) acceleration time is 5 seconds and the top speed is electronically limited to 250 km/h (155.5 mph). The Z4 M Coupé set a lap time at the Nürburgring Nordschleife of 8 minutes and 15 seconds.

=== Z4 M Roadster ===
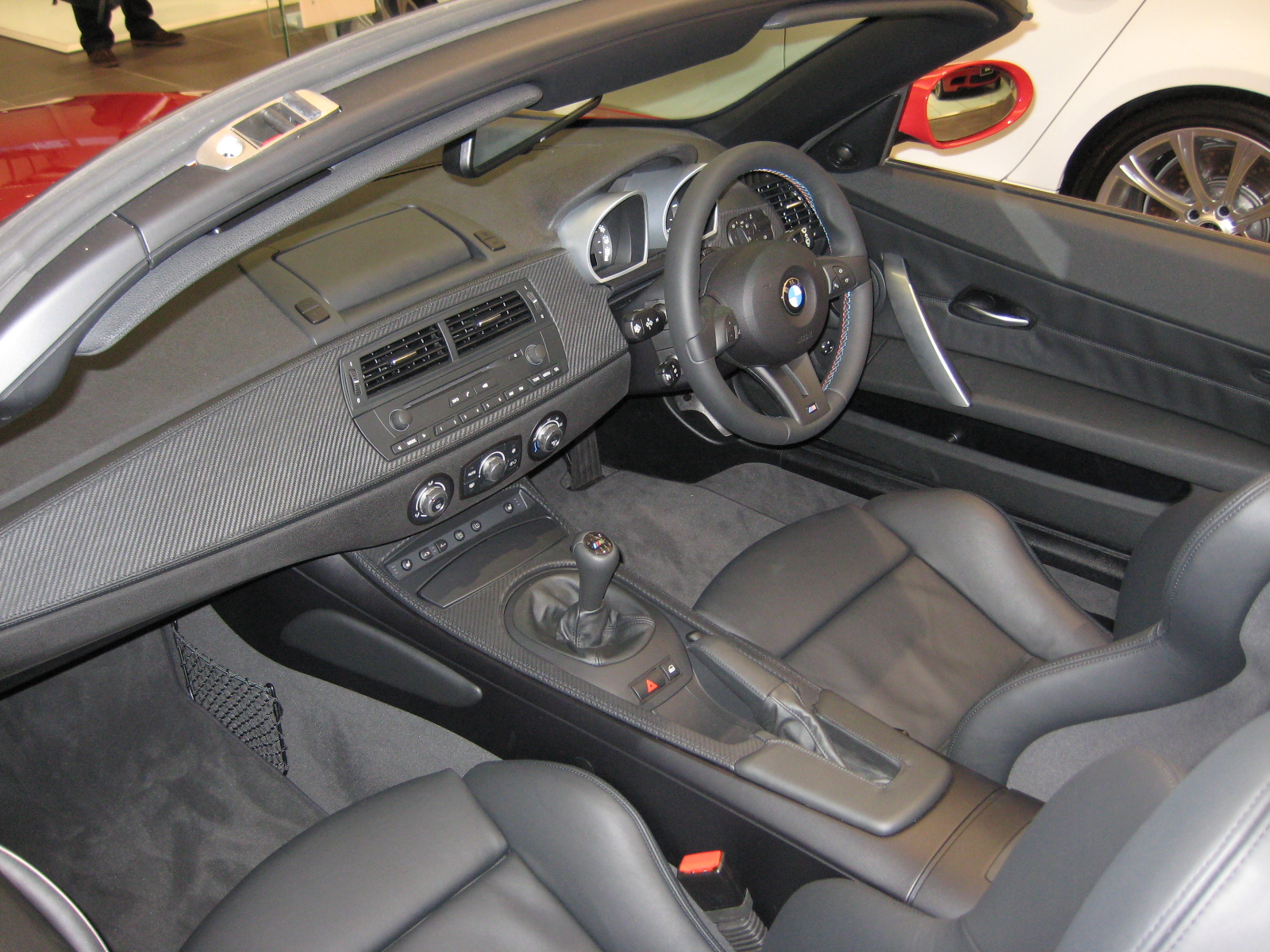
Z4 M Roadster interior

The roadster model was launched in late 2006.

Weighing 1,450 kg (3,197 lb), the M Roadster has a 0-97 km/h (60 mph) time of 4.7 seconds and a top speed electronically limited to 250 km/h (155 mph). Unlike the Z3 M Roadster, the external dimensions of the Z4 M Roadster are the same as the standard Z4.

=== Engine ===
The M Coupe and M Roadster are powered by the BMW S54 straight-six engine from the E46 M3. The engine has fly-by-wire throttle and double VANOS (variable valve timing). In most countries, the engine is rated at 252 kW (338 hp) at 7,900 rpm and 365 N⋅m (269 lb⋅ft) at 4,900 rpm- the same outputs as in the M3. The engine has a redline of 8,000 rpm. Cars sold in North America produce 250 kW (330 bhp) at 7,900 rpm and 355 N⋅m (262 lb⋅ft) of torque at 4,900 rpm. Unlike the S54 engine from the E46 M3 and Z3 M Roadster and Coupes, where BMW used the same MSS54 DME, the Z4 M Coupe and Roadster engine is controlled by the MSS70 DME which makes popular ECU tuning options for S54 engines on the E46 M3 and Z3 M models obsolete on the Z4 M.

=== Drivetrain ===
The engine was exclusively mated to a 6-speed "Type H" ZF manual transmission since the M3's Getrag 420G 6-speed transmission did not fit the Z4's chassis. This version of the ZF S6-37 transmission is designated ZF GS6-37BZ-TJEE and is similar to the one found in the 3.0i and 3.0si.

The Z4 uses the same limited-slip differential as the E46 M3. This clutch-type, torque-sensing LSD features the Variable M Differential Lock, codeveloped with specialists at GKN Viscodrive GmbH.

=== Chassis ===
The suspension system consisted of a strut design at the front and a multi-link design at the rear. The M Coupé's springs have higher rates and the dampers are more aggressive compared to the Z4 M roadster. The car achieved a lateral acceleration of 0.89g on the skid pad.

The Z4 M uses hydraulic power steering, unlike the electric power steering used by the rest of the Z4 range, and has thick rimmed steering wheel. Other changes include a wider front track, revised front suspension and steering geometry. All Z4M models feature a quicker steering ratio than the E46 M3 or E46 M3 CSL, with the M Coupé having an even quicker rack than the M Roadster.

Many components were shared with the E46 M3 including the rear subframe, rear anti-roll-bar mounting points, wheel bearings, and original equipment Continental ContiSport Contact tires. Front lower control arms are shared with the E46 Performance Package (ZHP) with unique offset bushings for the Z4M.

=== Brakes ===
The braking system shares many parts in common with the E46 M3. The brake calipers are from the M3 Competition model and the brake discs (consisting of aluminum hubs, stainless steel pins, cross drilled iron floating rotors) are from the E46 M3 CSL. Despite increases in rotor size, brake pads are the same part number for all E36 M3, E46 M3, and M Roadster/Coupé models.

=== Production ===
Production began on 4 April 2006 and ended in 2008 when the E85/E86 Z4 was replaced by the E89 Z4. A total of 4,275 M Coupes were produced, and 5,070 M Roadsters. This included 1,815 M Coupes for North America and 3,042 M Roadsters for North America.

== Awards ==
- Automobile Magazine "Design of the Year" 1999.
- The M Coupe/M Roadster made Car and Driver magazine's "Ten Best" list for 1999.
- European Car Magazine Grand Prix winner in 1999.
- The Top Gear (TV Show) "Best Driver's Car of the Year" 2000.
- The BMW M Coupe was chosen as one of "Hammond's Icons" by Top Gear in 2011.
- Jalopnik's included the M Coupe in their "Best 10 Cars of the Decade" feature.
- Top Gear (Magazine) featured the M Coupe as one of "the 149 Coolest Cars Ever" in a supplement included with the October 2015 issue (#274).
- Autoblog included the M Coupe in their "Greatest BMWs of the last 100 years" feature.
- The New York Daily News featured the M Coupe in their "Best Bimmers: our 10 favorite BMW models of the last 100 years" article.
- Top Gear (Website) included the BMW M Coupe in their "Some of the Greatest BMWs ever built" article, showcasing 25 cars, in celebration of BMW's centenary.
- The M Coupé appeared on the list of Autoevolution's "Ten of the Most Outstanding BMW M Cars of All Time".
- Mike Spinelli, founder of Jalopnik and host of AFTER/DRIVE, selected the BMW M Coupé on /Drive's "What's The Best BMW Of All Time?" feature.
- Road & Track included the M Coupé as 1 of just 13 BMWs in their "Best BMWs in History" feature for the company's 100 year anniversary.
- Maxim ranked the M Coupé in their feature of the "10 Most Killer Rides of the '90s".
- Donut Media featured the M Coupé as #11 in their "14 Best Cars BMW Ever Made" video.
- CarWOW's "Top 10 best BMW M cars. EVER!" placed the M Coupé at #6 on their list.
