= 2010 Australian GT Championship =

Seasons
- ← 2009 2011 →

The 2010 Australian GT Championship was a CAMS sanctioned Australian motor racing championship open to closed production based sports cars which were either approved by the FIA for GT3 competition or approved by CAMS as Australian GTs. The championship, which was the 14th Australian GT Championship, incorporated drivers titles in three divisions, GT Championship, GT Challenge and GT Production. The Australian GT Sportscar Group Pty Ltd was appointed as the Category Manager by CAMS for the championship, which was promoted as the "Vodka O Australian GT Championship".

Defending champion David Wall became the first multiple championship winner in the history of the title with a 30-point victory over fellow Porsche driver, James Koundouris. Wall, driving the family team's Porsche 911 GT3 Cup S, won five races and claimed round wins at Adelaide and Eastern Creek. Third places at Albert Park and at Bathurst were enough to hold off Phillip Island round winner Koundouris, even after being excluded from the first race at Sandown. Dean Grant (Lamborghini Gallardo and Mosler MT900) was third in the championship. Other round winners were Porsche driver Max Twigg, at Albert Park, and Tony Quinn. Quinn drove an Aston Martin DBRS9 and a Mosler MT900, winning the Bathurst round in the former and the Sandown round in the latter, allowing him to climb into fourth in the championship.

In the GT Challenge division, Shane Smollen took a 120-point win over fellow Porsche 911 GT3 drivers, Michael Loccisano and Ray Angus.

Chevrolet Corvette driver Paul Freestone came from behind at the final round of the series to defeat Tony Alford (Nissan GT-R) and take victory in the GT Production division. Mark O'Connor (Lotus Exige) was third.

Controversy erupted after two major accidents at the second round of the series, which supported the 2010 Australian Grand Prix. A multi-car accident caused heavy damage to several vehicles at the start of one race and resulted in changes to regulations for rolling restarts, which have had consequences beyond GT racing. Additionally a multi-car accident that occurred under yellow flag conditions saw penalties levied against Porsche drivers Ray Angus and Andrew Taplin after they tangled with a slow moving damaged car and the parked Ascari KZ1-R of John Bowe.

== Teams and drivers ==
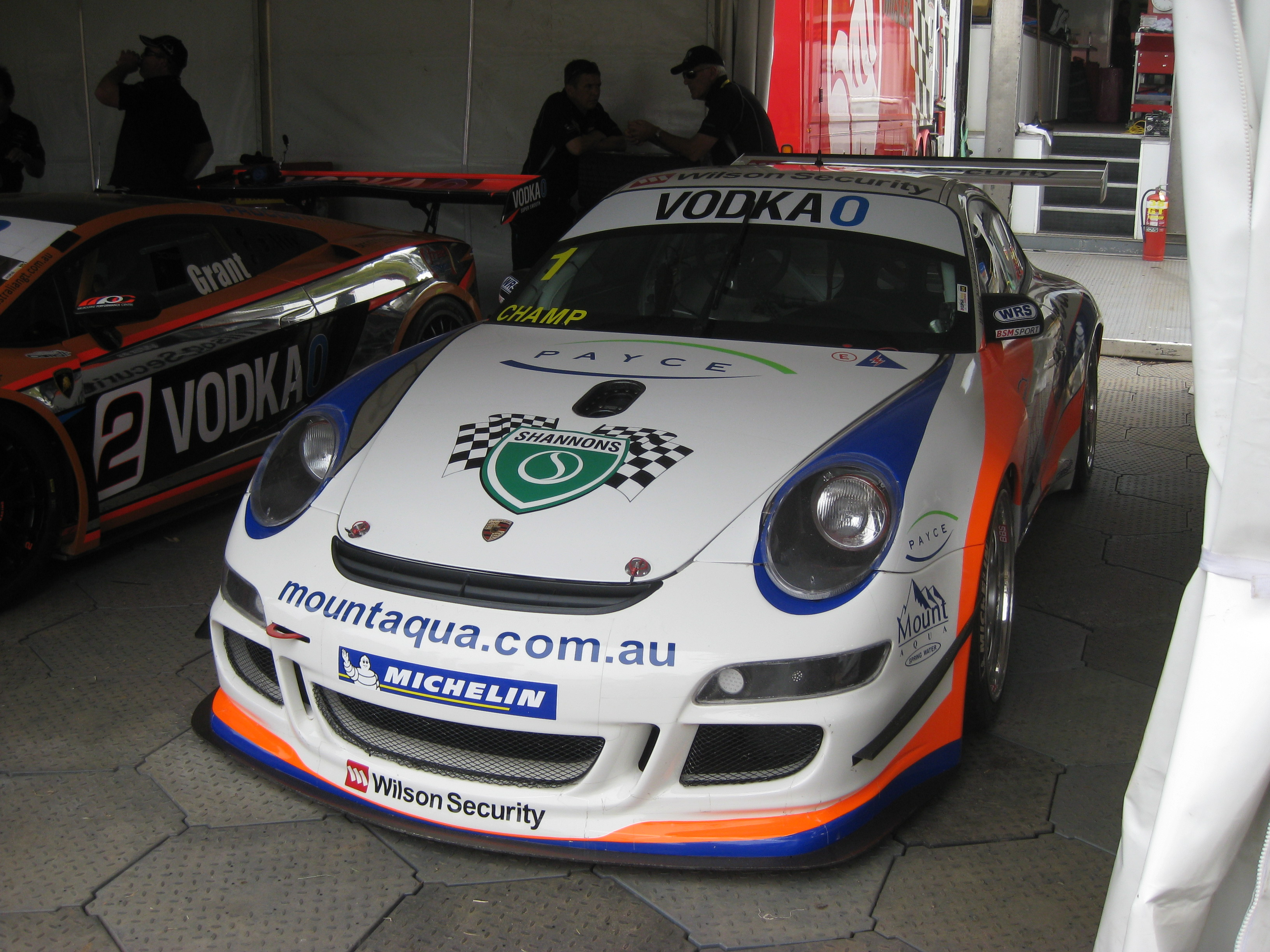
David Wall won the championship driving a Porsche 911 GT3 Cup S Type 997

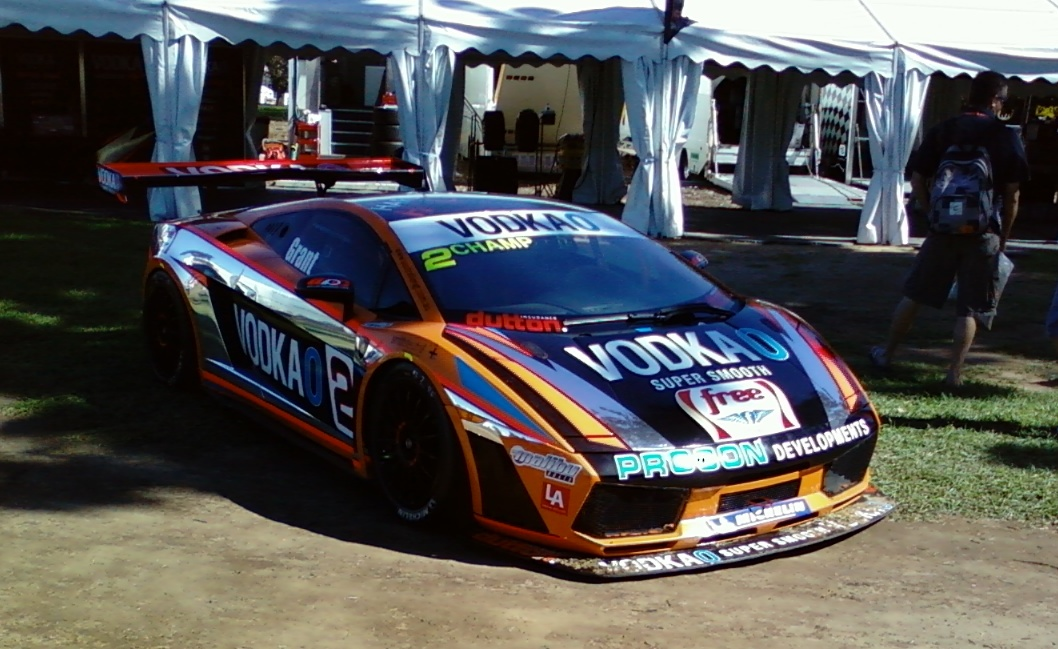
Dean Grant placed third driving a Lamborghini Gallardo (pictured) and a Mosler MT900R

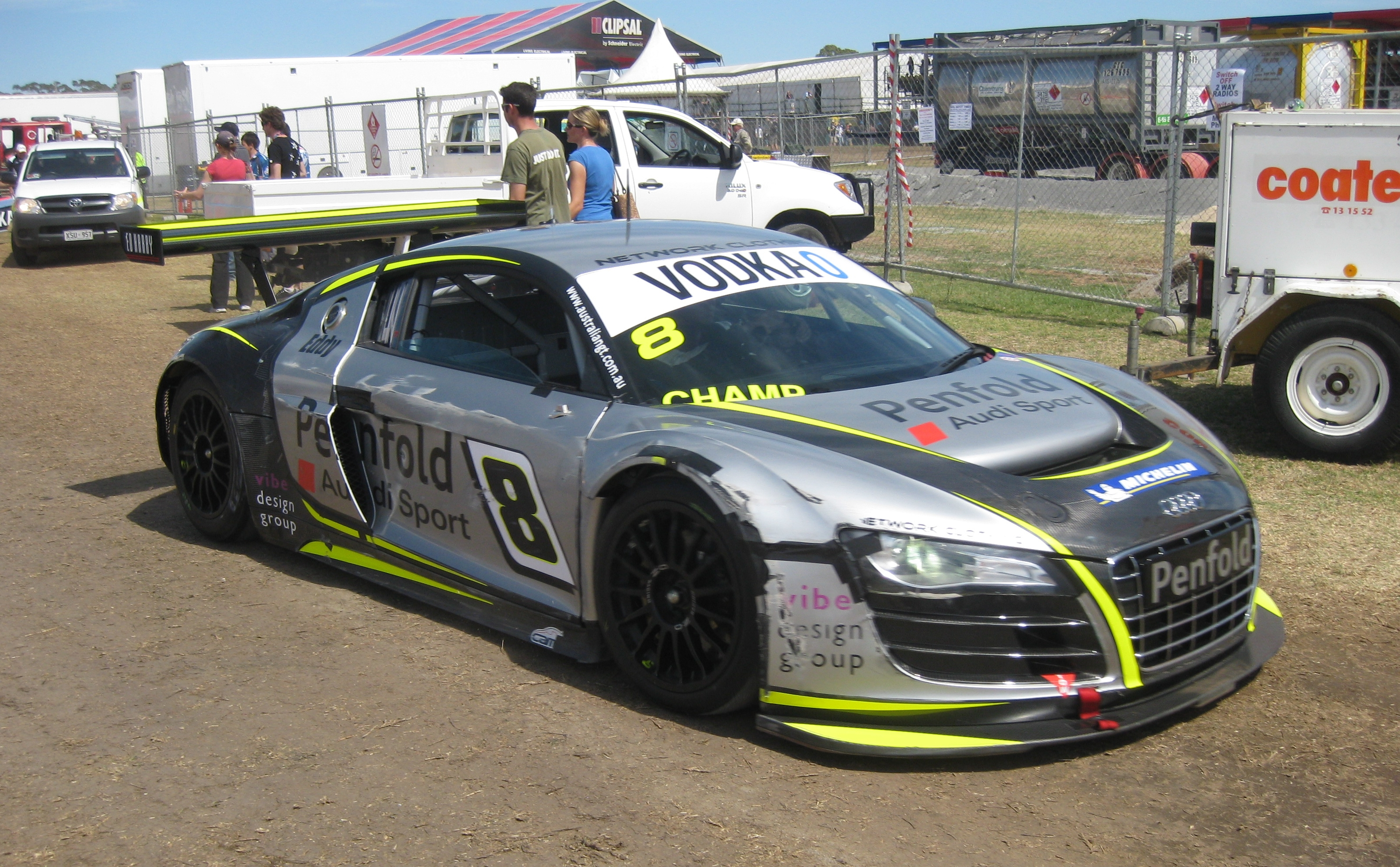
Mark Eddy placed sixth driving an Audi R8 LMS

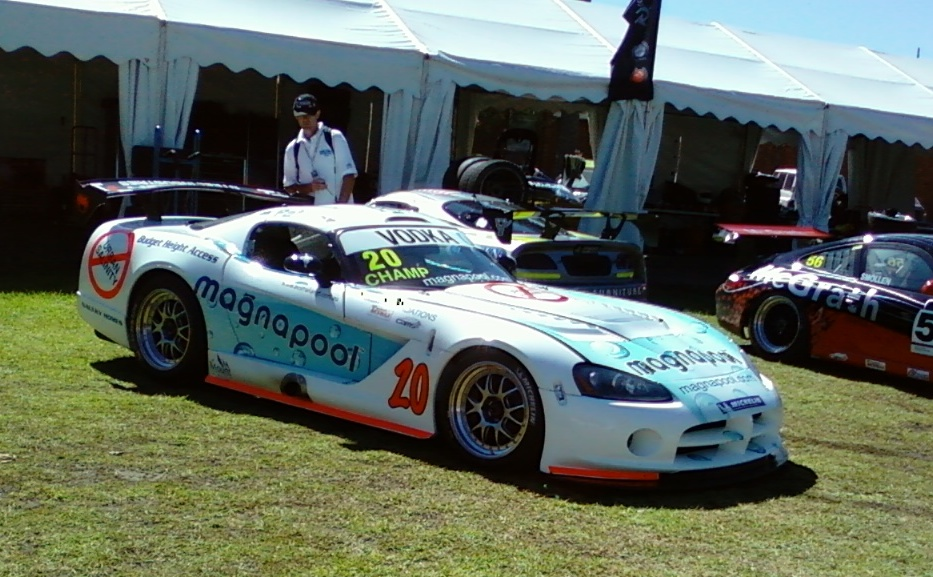
Ian Palmer placed 13th driving a Dodge Viper GT3

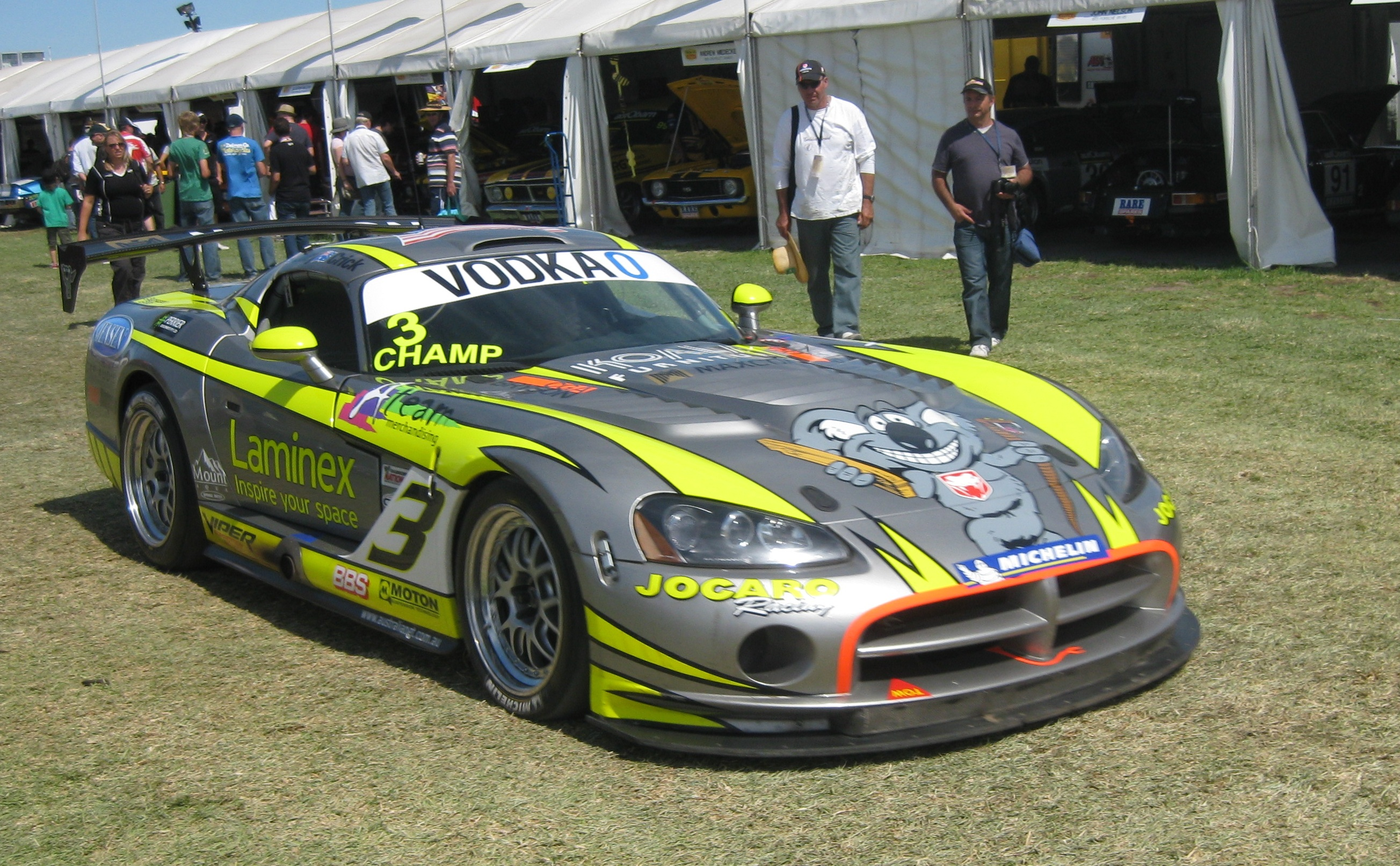
Ross Lilley placed 14th driving a Dodge Viper GT3

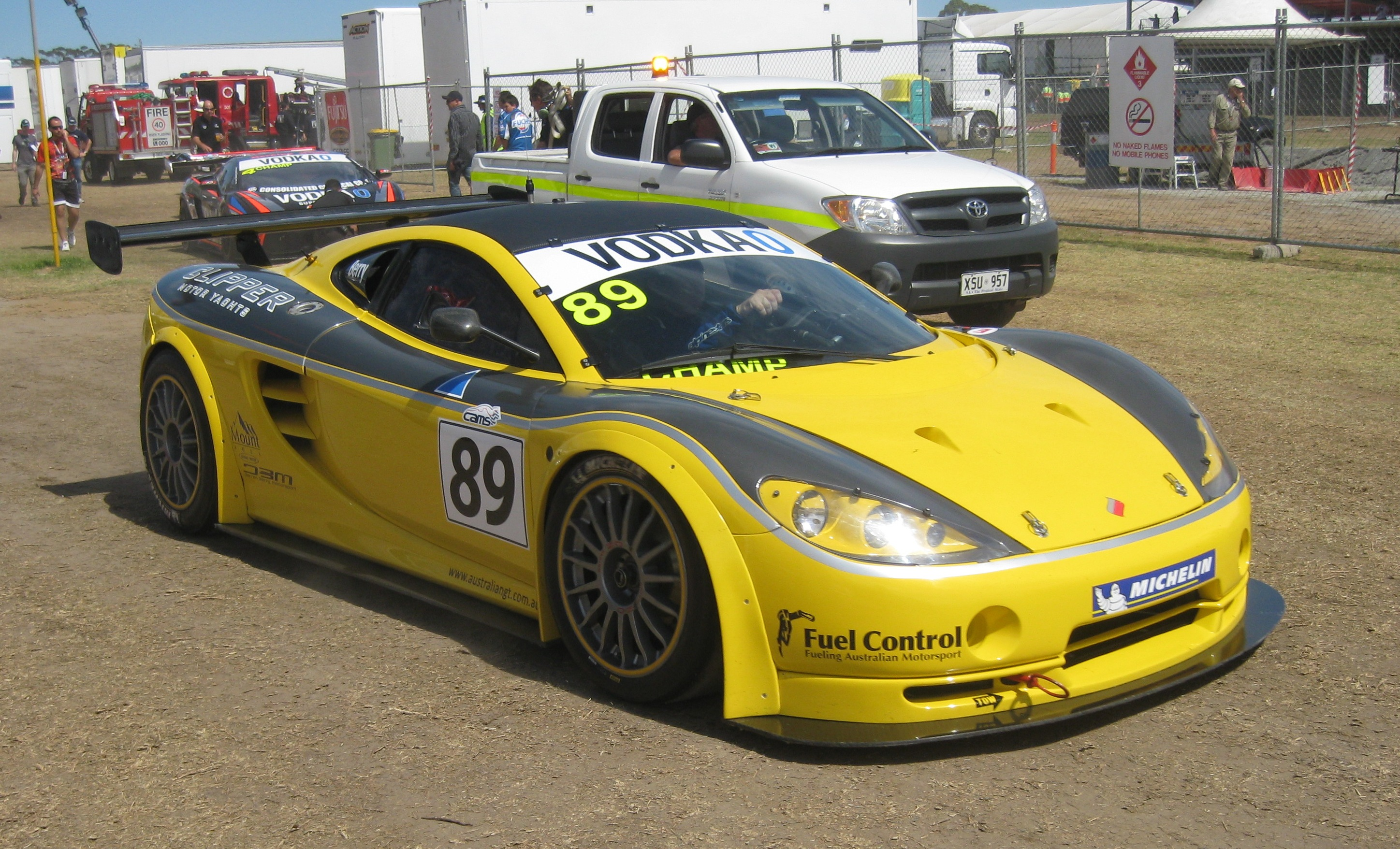
Darren Berry placed 23rd driving an Ascari KZ1-R

The following teams and drivers contested the 2010 Australian GT Championship.

Team	Car	Division	No	Driver
Wall Racing	Porsche 911 GT3 Cup S Type 997	Championship	1	(Australia) David Wall
Jocaro Motorsport	Lamborghini Gallardo; Mosler MT900R	Championship	2	(Australia) Dean Grant
Jocaro Motorsport	Dodge Viper GT3	Championship	3	(Australia) Ross Lilley
Jocaro Motorsport	Audi R8 GT3	Championship	8	(Australia) Mark Eddy
Consolidated Chemical	Lamborghini Gallardo	Championship	4	(Australia) Peter Hackett
Taplin Real Estate	Lamborghini Gallardo	Championship	5	(Australia) Andrew Taplin (Australia) Kevin Weeks
Golf Car Solutions	Porsche 911 GT3 RS Type 996	Challenge	6	(Australia) Jordan Ormsby
VIP Petfoods Racing	Mosler MT900; Aston Martin DBRS9	Championship	7	(United Kingdom) Tony Quinn
VIP Petfoods Racing	Mosler MT900	Championship	12	(Australia) Klark Quinn
Hallmarc Developments	Porsche 911 GT3 Cup S Type 997	Championship	9	(Australia) Marc Cini
Hallmarc Developments	Porsche 911 GT3 Cup Type 997	Challenge	19	(Australia) Michael Loccisano (Australia) Marc Cini
Dutton Insurance	Lotus Exige S	Production	10	(Australia) Mark O'Connor
MJR Airconditioning	Lamborghini Gallardo	Championship	11	(Australia) Mark Seamons
Jim Richards Racing	Porsche 911 GT3 Cup Type 997	Championship	15	(New Zealand) Jim Richards
Weeks Building Group	Porsche 911 GT3 Cup Type 997	Challenge	16	(Australia) Gary Dann
Inca Motorsports	Porsche 911 GT3 Cup Type 997	Challenge	17	(Australia) Ray Angus
Twigg Motorsport	Porsche 911 GT3 Cup S Type 997	Championship	18	(Australia) Max Twigg
Magnapool	Dodge Viper GT3	Championship	20	(Australia) Ian Palmer (Australia) Greg Crick
Interauto Motorsport	Lamborghini Gallardo	Championship	21	(Australia) Ross Zampatti
Beta Tools	Mosler MT900R	Championship	22	(Australia) Ash Samadi
Freestones Transport	Chevrolet Corvette Z06	Production	25	(Australia) Paul Freestone
Excen Corporate Centre	Chevrolet Corvette Z06	Production	26	(Australia) Barrie Nesbitt
Maranello Motorsport	Ferrari F430 GT3	Championship	27	(Australia) Nick O'Halloran
Trofeo Motorsport	Maserati Trofeo GT3	Challenge	29	(Australia) Jim Manolios
Trofeo Motorsport	Maserati GranTurismo GT3	Championship	29	(Australia) Jim Manolios
Kirrapak Sheetmetal	Lotus Elise HPE	Challenge	31	(Australia) Tim Mackie
Kirrapak Sheetmetal	Lotus Elise HPE	Challenge	32	(Australia) David Mackie
Bayside Church	Ferrari F430 GT3	Championship	37	(United Kingdom) Hector Lester
Pelorus Property Group	Porsche 911 GT3 Cup Type 997	Challenge	39	(Australia) Paul Tresidder
Supabarn Supermarkets	Porsche 911 GT3 Cup S Type 997	Championship	47	(Australia) Theo Koundouris
Supabarn Supermarkets	Porsche 911 GT3 Cup S Type 997	Championship	69	(Australia) James Koundouris
DFO	Porsche 911 GT3 Cup Type 996	Challenge	50	(Australia) Calvin Pusterla
AMAC Motorsport	Mosler MT900R	Championship	51	(Australia) Andrew MacPherson
Donut King Racing	Nissan GT-R	Production	54	(Australia) Tony Alford
Castrol	Dodge Viper GTS ACR	Championship	55	(Australia) Greg Crick
McGrath Estate Agents	Porsche 911 GT3 Cup Type 997	Challenge	56	(Australia) Shane Smollen
Adrenalin.com.au	Dodge Viper GTS ACR	Championship	58	(Australia) Richard Kimber
Adrenalin.com.au	Porsche 911 GT3 Cup Type 996	Challenge	58	(Australia) Richard Kimber
Austral Racing	Porsche 911 GT3 Cup Type 996	Challenge	63	(Australia) Richard Green
Globe	Lamborghini Gallardo	Championship	66	(Australia) Peter Hill
Pick Up Truck Pictures	Porsche 911 GT3 Cup Type 996	Challenge	67	(Australia) Eric Bana
ULX 110 Proven Custom Blend Oil	Porsche 911 GT3 RSR Type 996	Challenge	74	(Australia) Keith Wong (Australia) Graeme Cook; Kiang Kuan Wong
	Dodge Viper GT3	Championship	75	(United Kingdom) Rob Sherrard
One of a Kind	Lotus Exige S	Challenge	77	(Australia) Timothy Poulton
Maranello Motorsport	Ferrari 360 Challenge	Challenge	77	(Australia) Peter Edwards
Vic Air Supplies	Porsche 911 GT3 RSR Type 996	Challenge	88	(Australia) Simon Middleton
Vic Air Supplies	Lamborghini Gallardo	Championship	88	(Australia) Simon Middleton
Clipper Motoryachts	Ascari KZ1-R	Championship	89	(Australia) Darren Berry (Australia) John Bowe
World Link International	Porsche 911 GT3 Cup Type 997	Challenge	89	(Australia) Ivan Klasen
Pariah Motorsport	Lotus Exige GT3	Championship	98	(Australia) Angelo Lazaris
Livi Bathroom Tissue	Porsche 911 GT3 Cup Type 997	Challenge	99	(Australia) Damien Flack (Australia) Adrian Flack

== Race calendar ==
The championship was contested over a six-round series.

Rd.	Circuit	Location / state	Date	Winner		
Rd.	Circuit	Location / state	Date	Championship	Challenge	Production
Rd 1	Adelaide Street Circuit	Adelaide, South Australia	11–14 March	David Wall	Jordan Ormsby	Mark O'Connor
Rd 2	Albert Park Grand Prix Circuit	Melbourne, Victoria	25–28 March	Max Twigg	Damien Flack	Mark O'Connor
Rd 3	Eastern Creek Raceway	Sydney, New South Wales	20–30 May	David Wall	Damien Flack; Adrian Flack	Paul Freestone
Rd 4	Phillip Island Grand Prix Circuit	Phillip Island, Victoria	10–11 July	James Koundouris	Shane Smollen	Tony Alford
Rd 5	Mount Panorama Circuit	Bathurst, New South Wales	7–10 October	Tony Quinn	Shane Smollen	Paul Freestone
Rd 6	Sandown Raceway	Melbourne, Victoria	19–21 November	Tony Quinn	Shane Smollen	Paul Freestone

== Points system ==
Points were awarded in each division at each race according to the following table.

Position	1st	2nd	3rd	4th	5th	6th	7th	8th	9th	10th	11th	12th	13th	14th	15th	16th	17th	18th	19th	20th	21st	22nd	23rd	24th	25th	26th	27th	28th	29th	30th	31st	32nd	33rd	34th	35th
Two race format	57	52.5	49.5	48	46.5	45	43.5	42	40.5	39	37.5	36	34.5	33	31.5	30	28.5	27	25.5	24	22.5	21	19.5	18	16.5	15	13.5	12	10.5	9	7.5	6	4.5	3	1.5
Three race format	38	35	33	32	31	30	29	28	27	26	25	24	23	22	21	20	19	18	17	16	15	14	13	12	11	10	9	8	7	6	5	4	3	2	1

Within each division, each driver could count only his/her best five round results.

== Championship standings ==
Pos	Driver	Car	Round 1 – Ade			Round 2 – Alb			Round 3 – Eas		Round 4 – Phi		Round 5 – Bat		Round 6 – San		Pen.	Pts
Pos	Driver	Car	Race 1	Race 2	Race 3	Race 1	Race 2	Race 3	Race 1	Race 2	Race 1	Race 2	Race 1	Race 2	Race 1	Race 2	Pen.	Pts
GT Championship
1	David Wall	Porsche 911 GT3 Cup S Type 997	1st	1st	1st	6th		3rd	1st	1st	16th	5th	3rd	3rd	DSQ	5th		475.5
2	James Koundouris	Porsche 911 GT3 Cup S Type 997	Ret	7th	4th	2nd		2nd	Ret	5th	1st	1st	5th	4th	2nd	2nd		445.5
3	Dean Grant	Lamborghini Gallardo; Mosler MT900R	11th	6th	9th	5th		5th	7th	4th	2nd	3rd	8th	7th	19th	8th		440.5
4	Tony Quinn	Mosler MT900; Aston Martin DBRS9	9th	Ret	Ret	4th		17th	5th	3rd			1st	1st	1st	1st		406
5	Peter Hackett	Lamborghini Gallardo	4th	3rd	3rd	3rd		4th	2nd	6th	3rd	4th	Ret	10th	Ret	DNS		397
6	Mark Eddy	Audi R8 GT3	DNS	16th	12th	8th		7th	3rd	2nd	9th	8th			3rd	3rd		386.5
7	Greg Crick	Dodge Viper GT3	3rd	2nd	2nd	11th		6th	15th	Ret	5th	6th	4th	Ret	Ret	10th		338
8	Max Twigg	Porsche 911 GT3 Cup S Type 997	2nd	Ret	5th	1st		1st	Ret	Ret	4th	2nd	6th	5th	Ret	DNS		334
9	Simon Middleton	Lamborghini Gallardo				19th		11th	9th	9th	Ret	8th	12th	14th	9th	7th		327
10	Marc Cini	Porsche 911 GT3 Cup S Type 997	7th	5th	6th	12th		DNS			8th	Ret	11th	11th	5th	6th		322.5
11	Ash Samadi	Mosler MT900R	8th	12th	13th	18th		DNS	8th	7th	Ret	DNS	16th	Ret	4th	4th		316
12	Peter Hill	Lamborghini Gallardo	25th	14th	15th	10th		DNS	6th	8th	6th	Ret			6th	15th		307.5
13	Ian Palmer	Dodge Viper GT3	Ret	15th	17th	15th		13th	15th	Ret	15th	7th					10	203
14	Ross Lilley	Dodge Viper GT3	5th	4th	7th	14th		9th			7th	DNS	DNS	DNS			10	174.5
15	Theo Koundouris	Porsche 911 GT3 Cup S Type 997	12th	9th	10th	Ret		Ret	DNS	DNS			7th	6th				165.5
16	Andrew Macpherson	Mosler MT900R	22nd	20th	Ret	DNS		DNS					23rd	Ret	11th	11th		154
17	Richard Kimber	Dodge Viper GTS ACR	16th	25th	DNS								18th	17th	14th	Ret		151
18	Jim Richards	Porsche 911 GT3 Cup Type 997	10th	8th	11th	9th		8th										134
19	Kevin Weeks	Lamborghini Gallardo							4th	Ret	Ret	DNS	10th	9th				127.5
20	Klark Quinn	Mosler MT900	DNS	DNS	DNS								2nd	2nd				105
21	Andrew Taplin	Lamborghini Gallardo	6th	10th	8th	13th		14th									30	101
22	Mark Seamons	Lamborghini Gallardo									Ret	DNS			15th	17th		75
23	Darren Berry	Ascari KZ1-R	Ret	Ret	24th										Ret	21st		54.5
24	Ross Zampatti	Lamborghini Gallardo				28th		24th										38
24	Nick O'Halloran	Ferrari F430 GT3				23rd		29th										38
24	Rob Sherrard	Dodge Viper GT3				27th		25th	Ret	DNS								38
27	Jim Manolios	Maserati GranTurismo GT3				31st		30th										34
28	Angelo Lazaris	Lotus Exige GT3												15th				31.5
29	John Bowe	Ascari KZ1-R				7th		Ret										29
NC	Hector Lester	Ferrari F430 GT3				22nd		10th										
GT Challenge
1	Shane Smollen	Porsche 911 GT3 Cup Type 997	18th	13th	16th	Ret		23rd	12th	10th	12th	9th	14th	15th	12th	9th	20	516
2	Michael Loccisano	Porsche 911 GT3 Cup Type 997	14th	22nd	20th	Ret		20th	19th	14th	11th	10th	19th	Ret	10th	Ret		396
3	Ray Angus	Porsche 911 GT3 Cup Type 997	20th	17th	19th	20th		15th	14th	Ret			20th	16th	20th	20th	30	377.5
4	Paul Tresidder	Porsche 911 GT3 Cup Type 997				Ret		21st	11th	12th			17th	Ret	13th	13th		286.5
5	Damien Flack	Porsche 911 GT3 Cup Type 997				17th		12th	10th	11th	10th	13th						283
6	Adrian Flack	Porsche 911 GT3 Cup Type 997							10th	11th	10th	13th						210
7	Keith Wong	Porsche 911 GT3 RSR Type 996	Ret	DNS	DNS	21st		16th	20th	13th	14th	Ret	Ret	DNS			10	191.5
8	Jordan Ormsby	Porsche 911 GT3 RSR Type 996	15th	11th	14th	16th		Ret										147
9	Gary Dann	Porsche 911 GT3 Cup Type 997	13th	18th	18th													103
10	Eric Bana	Porsche 911 GT3 Cup Type 996									13th	11th						96
11	Peter Edwards	Ferrari 360 Challenge													20th	19th		94.5
12	Simon Middleton	Porsche 911 GT3 RSR Type 996	17th	19th	21st													93
13	Marc Cini	Porsche 911 GT3 Cup Type 997							19th	14th								91.5
14	Jim Manolios	Maserati Trofeo GT3	24th	26th	25th													87
15	Richard Green	Porsche 911 GT3 Cup Type 996				29th		27th										58
16	Ivan Klasen	Porsche 911 GT3 Cup Type 997									9th	Ret						96
17	Graeme Cook	Porsche 911 GT3 RSR Type 996							20th	13th								48
18	Richard Kimber	Dodge Viper GTS ACR							13th	Ret								48
19	Kiang Kuan Wong	Porsche 911 GT3 RSR Type 996									14th	Ret						45
20	Tim Mackie	Lotus Elise HPE				Ret		19th										31
21	David Mackie	Lotus Elise HPE				25th		Ret										31
NC	Calvin Pusterla	Porsche 911 GT3 Cup Type 996				DNS		DNS										0
GT Production
1	Paul Freestone	Chevrolet Corvette Z06	23rd	23rd	23rd	24th		28th	16th	15th			13th	13th	7th	12th		510.5
2	Tony Alford	Nissan GT-R	21st	24th	DNS	30th		26th	17th	16th	17th	12th	21st	Ret	17th	18th		452
3	Mark O'Connor	Lotus Exige S	19th	21st	22nd	26th		18th	21st	Ret	Ret	DNS	15th	12th	8th	14th		449.5
4	Barrie Nesbitt	Chevrolet Corvette Z06							18th	17th			24th	18th	18th	20th		292.5
5	Timothy Poulton	Lotus Exige S				32nd		22nd										67

Colour	Result
Gold	Winner
Silver	Second place
Bronze	Third place
Green	Points classification
Blue	Non-points classification
Blue	Non-classified finish (NC)
Purple	Retired, not classified (Ret)
Red	Did not qualify (DNQ)
Red	Did not pre-qualify (DNPQ)
Black	Disqualified (DSQ)
White	Did not start (DNS)
White	Withdrew (WD)
White	Race cancelled (C)
Blank	Did not practice (DNP)
Blank	Did not arrive (DNA)
Blank	Excluded (EX)

- Note: Within each division, each driver could count only his/her best five round results.
- Note: No points were awarded for Race 2 at the Albert Park round due to the race being declared with under 50% of the scheduled distance completed.
- Note: Hector Lester competed on an International licence and was not eligible for championship points.

== Australian Tourist Trophy ==
The 2010 Australian Tourist Trophy was awarded by the Confederation of Australian Motor Sport to the driver accumulating the highest aggregate points total from the Eastern Creek and Phillip island "endurance" rounds of the championship. The title, which was the 21st Australian Tourist Trophy, was won by David Wall, driving a Porsche 911 GT3 Cup S Type 997.
