= 2009 Australian GT Championship =

Motor racing competition

Seasons
- ← 2008 2010 →

The 2009 Australian GT Championship was an Australian national motor racing title sanctioned by the Confederation of Australian Motor Sport for drivers of closed production based sports cars which were either approved by the FIA for GT3 competition or approved by CAMS as Australian GTs. It was the thirteenth Australian GT Championship.

The GT Championship division for FIA GT3 specification vehicles was won by former Carrera Cup racer David Wall driving a Porsche 997 GT3 Cup S for the family owned Wall Racing team, which included race victories at Albert Park, Phillip Island, Eastern Creek and Mount Panorama for a comfortable victory margin of almost 90 points over another former Carrera Cup racer James Koundouris. Veteran Jim Richards, driving Wall's 2008 Carrera Cup car, finished third in the championship. Neither Koundouris or Richards took race wins in the series. The other race winners were Craig Baird, whose Mosler dominated the opening round at Adelaide but the team was sold mid-season leaving Baird without a drive, Dean Grant, whose Lamborghini gained a win at Eastern Creek, and Max Twigg, who debuted a 997 GT3 Cup S similar to Wall's at the final round at Sydney Olympic Park to dominate the event.

The GT Challenge division for older cars, (mostly Porsche 996 Carrera Cup cars and one-make specification Ferraris and Maseratis), was won by Jordan Ormsby whose Porsche GT3-RS dominated the series after Klark Quinn was moved from the Challenge division to the Championship division. Quinn won the first five races for the season prior to that. Michael Loccisano was second driving a 996 Carrera Cup with Keith Wong third driving a Ferrari 360.

The GT Production division for production based sportscars Paul Freestone driving a Chevrolet Corvette Z06 and a HSV Coupé GTS. Lotus Exige drivers Mark O'Connor and Tim Poulton completed the top three.

== Teams and drivers ==
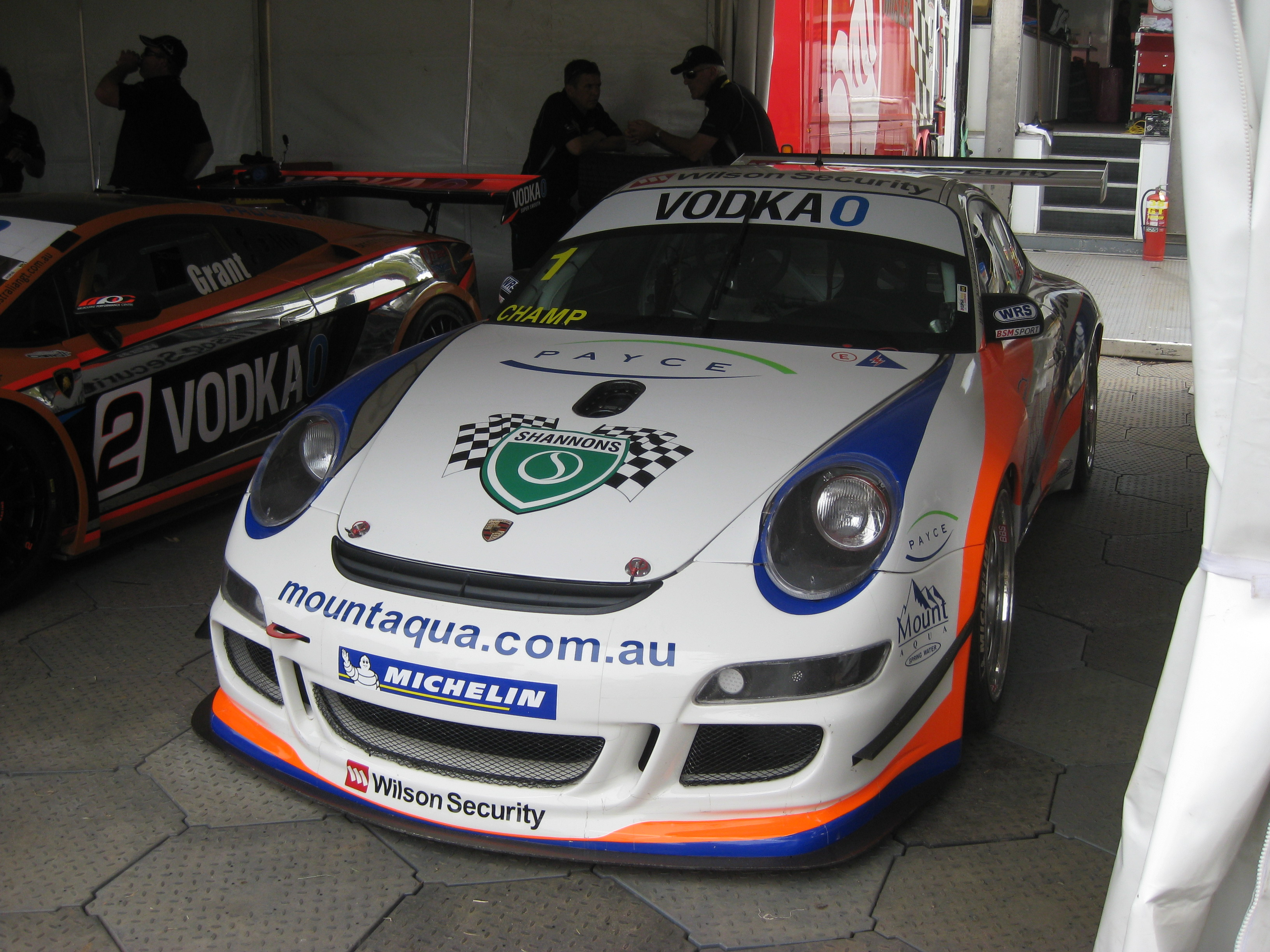
David Wall won the championship driving a Porsche 911 GT3 Cup S Type 997. (2010 image).

The following teams and drivers competed in the 2009 Australian GT Championship.

| Team | Car | Division | No | Driver |
|---|---|---|---|---|
| Jocaro Motorsport | Lamborghini Gallardo | Championship | 1 | (Australia) Mark Eddy |
| Jocaro Motorsport | Lamborghini Gallardo | Championship | 2 | (Australia) Dean Grant |
| Jocaro Motorsport | Dodge Viper GTS ACR | Championship | 3 | (Australia) Ross Lilley |
| Jocaro Motorsport | Porsche 911 GT3 Cup Type 996 | Challenge | 50 | (Australia) Calvin Pusterla |
| Consolidated Chemical Company | Lamborghini Gallardo | Championship | 4 | (Australia) Ted Huglin (Australia) John Bowe |
| Taplin Real Estate | Lamborghini Gallardo | Championship | 5 | (Australia) Andrew Taplin |
| Golf Car Solutions | Porsche 996 GT3 RS | Challenge | 6 | (Australia) Jordan Ormsby |
| VIP Petfoods Racing | Aston Martin DBRS9 | Championship | 7 | (United Kingdom) Tony Quinn |
| VIP Petfoods Racing | Porsche 996 GT3 Cup; Porsche 997 GT3 Cup | Challenge; Championship | 12 | (Australia) Klark Quinn |
| Greg Murphy Racing | Porsche 911 GT3 RSR Type 996 | Championship | 8 | (Australia) Simon Middleton |
| Creative Colour | Porsche 911 GT3 Cup Type 996 | Challenge | 8 | (Australia) Jeff Bobik |
| Hallmarc Developments | Porsche 911 GT3 Cup Type 997 | Championship | 9 | (Australia) Marc Cini |
| Hallmarc Developments | Porsche 911 GT3 Cup Type 996 | Challenge | 19 | (Australia) Michael Loccisano |
| SMS Commander | Lotus Exige S | Production | 10 | (Australia) Mark O'Connor |
| Briggs Motor Sport | Dodge Viper GTS ACR | Championship | 11 | (Australia) John Briggs |
| Jim Richards Racing | Porsche 911 GT3 Cup Type 997 | Championship | 15 | (New Zealand) Jim Richards |
| Twigg Motorsport | Porsche 911 GT3 Cup Type 997; Porsche 911 GT3 Cup S Type 997 | Championship | 18 | (Australia) Max Twigg |
| Team Palmer | Dodge Viper GTS ACR | Championship | 20 | (Australia) Ian Palmer |
| Bayside Church | Ferrari F430 GT3 | Championship | 21 | (United Kingdom) Hector Lester |
| Bruce Lynton BMW | BMW M3 | Production | 23 | (Australia) Beric Lynton |
| Freestone's Racing | Chevrolet Corvette Z06 | Production | 25 | (Australia) Paul Freestone |
| Freestone Transport | HSV Coupé GTS | Production | 26 | (Australia) Paul Freestone |
| Maranello Motorsport | Ferrari F430 GT3 | Championship | 27 | (Australia) Nick O'Halloran (Denmark) Allan Simonsen |
| Maranello Motorsport | Ferrari 360 Challenge | Challenge | 37 | (Australia) Andrew Barlow |
| Maranello Motorsport | Ferrari 430 Challenge | Challenge | 99 | (Indonesia) Maher Algadrie |
| Trofeo Motorsport | Maserati Trofeo Light | Challenge | 29 | (Australia) Jim Manolios (Australia) Rod Wilson |
| Warrin Mining | Porsche 911 GT3 Cup Type 996 | Challenge | 30 | (Australia) Adam Wallis |
| Kirchner Constructions | Porsche 911 GT3 Cup Type 996 | Challenge | 33 | (Australia) Fraser Kirchner |
| PR Racing Technology; Wall Racing | Porsche 911 GT3 Cup S Type 997 | Championship | 38 | (Australia) David Wall |
| PR Racing Technology; Wall Racing | Porsche 911 GT3 RSR Type 996 | Championship | 39 | (Australia) Des Wall |
| PR Racing Technology; Wall Racing | Porsche 911 GT3 RSR Type 996 | Championship; Challenge | 39 | (Australia) Paul Tresidder |
| PR Racing Technology; Wall Racing | Porsche 911 GT3 Cup Type 996 | Challenge | 58 | (Australia) Richard Kimber |
| Italia Motori | Maserati Trofeo | Production | 42 | (Australia) Kai Mysliwiecz |
| Brennan Voice Data & IT | Ferrari F430 GT3 | Championship | 43 | (Australia) David Stevens |
| Supabarn Supermarkets | Porsche 911 GT3 Cup Type 997 | Championship | 47 | (Australia) Theo Koundouris |
| Supabarn Supermarkets | Porsche 911 GT3 Cup Type 997; Porsche 911 GT3 Cup S Type 997 | Championship | 69 | (Australia) James Koundouris |
| AMAC Motorsport | Lotus Exige S | Production | 51 | (Australia) Andrew MacPherson (Australia) Mike Reedy |
| AMAC Motorsport | Mosler MT900R | Championship | 51 | (Australia) Andrew MacPherson |
| Donut King Racing | HSV Coupé GTS; Nissan GT-R | Production | 54 | (Australia) Tony Alford |
| Donut King Racing | HSV Coupe GTS | Production | 56 | (Australia) Barrie Nesbitt |
| John Teulan Racing | Mosler MT900R | Championship | 55 | (New Zealand) Craig Baird |
| John Teulan Racing | Mosler MT900R | Championship | 88 | (Australia) John Teulan |
| McGrath Estate Agents | Porsche 911 GT3 Cup Type 997 | Championship | 56 | (Australia) Shane Smollen |
| Austral Racing | Porsche 911 GT3 Cup Type 996 | Challenge | 63 | (Australia) Richard Green |
| Racing Incident | Porsche 911 GT3 Cup Type 997 | Championship | 66 | (Australia) Peter Hill |
| Eric Bana Racing | Porsche 911 GT3 Cup Type 996 | Challenge | 67 | (Australia) Eric Bana |
| Juniper Racing | Porsche 911 GT3 Cup Type 997 | Championship | 71 | (Australia) Shaun Juniper |
| Bicycle Express Motorsport | Ferrari 360 Challenge | Challenge | 74 | (Australia) Keith Wong |
| OOAK Racing | Lotus Exige S | Production | 77 | (Australia) Timothy Poulton |
| Cue | Lotus Elise HDPE | Championship | 78 | (Australia) Justin Levis |
| Pariah Motorsport | Lotus Exige GT3 | Championship | 98 | (Australia) Angelo Lazaris |

== Race calendar ==
The championship was contested over a six-round series. Within each division, each driver could count only his/her best five round results.

| Rd. | Event | Circuit | Location / state | Date | Format | Winner | | |
| Rd. | Event | Circuit | Location / state | Date | Format | Championship | Challenge | Production |
|---|---|---|---|---|---|---|---|---|
| Rd 1 | Clipsal 500 | Adelaide Street Circuit | Adelaide, South Australia | 19–22 March | Three races | Craig Baird | Klark Quinn | Mark O'Connor |
| Rd 2 | Australian Grand Prix | Albert Park Grand Prix Circuit | Melbourne, Victoria | 26–29 March | Three races | David Wall | Klark Quinn | Paul Freestone |
| Rd 3 | Australian GT Classic | Phillip Island Grand Prix Circuit | Phillip Island, Victoria | 16–17 May | Two races | David Wall | Jordan Ormsby | Paul Freestone |
| Rd 4 | Shannons Nationals Motor Racing Championships | Eastern Creek Raceway | Sydney, New South Wales | 18–19 July | Three races | David Wall | Jordan Ormsby | Paul Freestone |
| Rd 5 | Bathurst 1000 | Mount Panorama Circuit | Bathurst, New South Wales | 8–11 October | Two races | David Wall | Paul Tresidder | Paul Freestone |
| Rd 6 | Sydney 500 | Homebush Street Circuit | Sydney, New South Wales | 4–6 December | Two races | Max Twigg | Michael Loccisano | Tony Alford |

== Championship standings ==
Points score sourced from:

| Pos | Driver | Car | Round 1 Ade. | | | Round 2 Alb. | | | Round 3 Phi. | | Round 4 Eas. | | | Round 5 Bat. | | Round 6 Syd. | | Pts |
| Pos | Driver | Car | Race 1 | Race 2 | Race 3 | Race 1 | Race 2 | Race 3 | Race 1 | Race 2 | Race 1 | Race 2 | Race 3 | Race 1 | Race 2 | Race 1 | Race 2 | Pts |
GT Championship
| 1 | David Wall | Porsche 911 GT3 Cup S Type 997 | 2nd | 2nd | 2nd | 1st | 1st | | 1st | 1st | 1st | 2nd | 1st | 1st | 1st | 2nd | 4th | 544 |
| 2 | James Koundouris | Porsche 911 GT3 Cup Type 997; Porsche 911 GT3 Cup S Type 997 | 4th | 3rd | 3rd | 6th | 6th | | 10th | 8th | 5th | 4th | 5th | 4th | 5th | 6th | 9th | 455.5 |
| 3 | Jim Richards | Porsche 911 GT3 Cup Type 997 | Ret | 13th | 8th | 3rd | 3rd | | 2nd | 3rd | 4th | 3rd | 4th | 3rd | 4th | 7th | 6th | 451 |
| 4 | Ross Lilley | Dodge Viper GTS ACR | 15th | 18th | 12th | 14th | 11th | | 3rd | 4th | 6th | 5th | 6th | 7th | 8th | 8th | 7th | 431.5 |
| 5 | Dean Grant | Lamborghini Gallardo | 9th | 8th | 6th | 8th | Ret | | 11th | 2nd | 2nd | 1st | 3rd | Ret | 13th | 10th | 8th | 404 |
| 6 | Marc Cini | Porsche 911 GT3 Cup Type 997 | 10th | 9th | 7th | 11th | 12th | | 9th | Ret | 7th | 10th | 9th | 9th | 9th | 9th | 5th | 389 |
| 7 | Theo Koundouris | Porsche 911 GT3 Cup Type 997 | Ret | 11th | Ret | 10th | 8th | | Ret | 10th | 8th | 8th | 7th | 6th | 7th | 3rd | 2nd | 371.5 |
| 8 | Tony Quinn | Aston Martin DBRS9 | Ret | Ret | DNS | 2nd | 2nd | | 14th | 16th | Ret | 9th | Ret | 11th | 2nd | 4th | 3rd | 355 |
| 9 | Max Twigg | Porsche 911 GT3 Cup Type 997; Porsche 911 GT3 Cup S Type 997 | 6th | 4th | 4th | 5th | 5th | | Ret | 11th | Ret | 6th | Ret | | | 1st | 1st | 340.5 |
| 10 | Mark Eddy | Lamborghini Gallardo | 8th | 7th | 11th | 7th | 7th | | 11th | 2nd | 3rd | 7th | 2nd | DNS | DNS | | | 334.5 |
| 11 | Peter Hill | Porsche 911 GT3 Cup Type 997 | 5th | 6th | 10th | 18th | 13th | | 12th | 6th | | | | | | 11th | 10th | 297 |
| 12 | Ted Huglin | Lamborghini Gallardo | 20th | 21st | 18th | 21st | 19th | | 5th | 9th | | | | 17th | 18th | 24th | Ret | 294 |
| 13 | Simon Middleton | Porsche 911 GT3 RSR Type 996 | | | | | | | 8th | 12th | | | | 15th | 19th | 17th | 24th | 216 |
| 14 | Andrew Macpherson | Mosler MT900R | | | | | | | | | 15th | 14th | 11th | 12th | 16th | 25th | 21st | 213 |
| 15 | Nick O'Halloran | Ferrari F430 GT3 | 12th | 10th | 14th | 15th | 31st | | 4th | 7th | | | | | | | | 212.5 |
| 16 | Ian Palmer | Dodge Viper GTS ACR | 17th | 15th | Ret | Ret | 23rd | | DNS | 13th | 19th | Ret | DNS | 8th | 10th | Ret | DNS | 210.5 |
| 17 | Andrew Taplin | Lamborghini Gallardo | 7th | Ret | 19th | 12th | 9th | | 6th | 5th | | | | | | | | 197.5 |
| 18 | Klark Quinn | Porsche 911 GT3 Cup Type 997 | | | | | | | | | | | | 2nd | 3rd | 5th | Ret | 148.5 |
| 19 | Craig Baird | Mosler MT900R | 1st | 1st | 1st | Ret | Ret | | | | | | | | | | | 114 |
| 20 | Allan Simonsen | Ferrari F430 GT3 | | | | | | | 4th | 7th | | | | | | | | 91.5 |
| 20 | Shaun Juniper | Porsche 911 GT3 Cup Type 997 | | | | | | | | | | | | 5th | 6th | | | 91.5 |
| 22 | John Bowe | Lamborghini Gallardo | | | | | | | 5th | 9th | | | | | | | | 87 |
| 23 | Angelo Lazaris | Lotus Exige GT3 | | | | Ret | Ret | | | | 10th | 11th | 10th | Ret | Ret | Ret | Ret | 78 |
| 24 | Des Wall | Porsche 911 GT3 RSR Type 996 | 14th | 16th | 13th | | | | | | | | | | | | | 73 |
| 25 | Shane Smollen | Porsche 911 GT3 Cup Type 997 | | | | | | | | | | | | | | 13th | 11th | 72 |
| 25 | David Stevens | Ferrari F430 GT3 | | | | | | | | | | | | | | 12th | 16th | 72 |
| 27 | Justin Levis | Lotus Elise HDPE | | | | 17th | 15th | | | | | | | | | | | 47 |
| 28 | Paul Tresidder | Porsche 911 GT3 RSR Type 996 | | | | 20th | 18th | | | | | | | | | | | 44 |
| | Hector Lester | Ferrari F430 GT3 | | | | 4th | 4th | | | | | | | | | | | |
| | John Teulan | Mosler MT900R | Ret | DNS | DNS | Ret | Ret | | | | DNS | DNS | DNS | | | | | |
| | John Briggs | Dodge Viper GTS ACR | Ret | Ret | DNS | | | | | | | | | | | | | |
GT Challenge
| 1 | Jordan Ormsby | Porsche 996 GT3 RS | 11th | 12th | 9th | 13th | 14th | | 17th | 14th | 11th | 13th | 9th | 21st | 15th | 14th | 15th | 531(601) |
| 2 | Michael Loccisano | Porsche 911 GT3 Cup Type 996 | 18th | 19th | 15th | Ret | 20th | | 7th | Ret | | | | 19th | Ret | 15th | 12th | 345 |
| 3 | Keith Wong | Ferrari 360 Challenge | 19th | 23rd | 17th | 22nd | 21st | | | | | | | | | 21st | 20th | 238 |
| 4 | Andrew Barlow | Ferrari 360 Challenge | 16th | 17th | 16th | 19th | 17th | | | | 12th | 12th | DNS | | | | | 233 |
| 5 | Paul Tresidder | Porsche 911 GT3 RSR Type 996 | | | | | | | | | | | | 13th | 11th | 16th | 13th | 216 |
| 6 | Richard Kimber | Porsche 911 GT3 Cup Type 996 | 21st | 20th | Ret | Ret | DNS | | | | | | | 20th | Ret | 20th | 19th | 198.5 |
| 7 | Klark Quinn | Porsche 996 GT3 Cup | 3rd | 5th | 5th | 9th | 10th | | | | | | | | | | | 190 |
| 8 | Eric Bana | Porsche 911 GT3 Cup Type 996 | | | | 23rd | 22nd | | | | | | | | | 18th | 14th | 156.5 |
| 9 | Jim Manolios | Maserati Trofeo Light | | | | | | | 18th | 15th | | | | | | | | 102 |
| 9 | Rod Wilson | Maserati Trofeo Light | | | | | | | 18th | 15th | | | | | | | | 102 |
| 11 | Calvin Pusterla | Porsche 911 GT3 Cup Type 996 | | | | | | | | | | | | | | 19th | 17th | 93 |
| 12 | Adam Wallis | Porsche 911 GT3 Cup Type 996 | 13th | 14th | Ret | | | | | | | | | | | | | 66 |
| 12 | Jeff Bobik | Porsche 911 GT3 Cup Type 996 | | | | 16th | 16th | | | | | | | | | | | 66 |
| 14 | Fraser Kirchner | Porsche 911 GT3 Cup Type 996 | | | | 24th | 24th | | | | | | | | | | | 57 |
| 15 | Richard Green | Porsche 911 GT3 Cup Type 996 | | | | 27th | 26th | | | | | | | | | | | 55 |
| | Maher Algadrie | Ferrari 430 Challenge | | | | | | | DNS | DNS | | | | | | | | |
GT Production
| 1 | Paul Freestone | Chevrolet Corvette Z06; HSV Coupé GTS | | | | 26th | 25th | | 16th | 17th | 13th | 15th | 14th | 10th | 12th | 23rd | 23rd | 504.5 |
| 2 | Mark O'Connor | Lotus Exige S | 22nd | 24th | 20th | 32nd | 28th | | 15th | 18th | Ret | DNS | DNS | 14th | 14th | Ret | 18th | 440 |
| 3 | Tim Poulton | Lotus Exige S | Ret | 22nd | 21st | 28th | 29th | | 13th | Ret | 16th | 18th | 12th | 16th | Ret | Ret | Ret | 347.5 |
| 4 | Tony Alford | HSV Coupé GTS; Nissan GT-R | | | | 29th | 33rd | | | | Ret | 16th | 13th | 18th | 17th | 22nd | 22nd | 338 |
| 5 | Beric Lynton | BMW M3 | 24th | Ret | 22nd | 25th | 27th | | | | | | | | | | | 139 |
| 6 | Kai Mysliwiecz | Maserati Trofeo | | | | | | | | | 14th | 17th | 15th | | | | | 100 |
| 7 | Andrew Macpherson | Lotus Exige S | 23rd | Ret | DNS | 30th | 30th | | DNS | DNS | | | | | | | | 97 |
| 8 | Barrie Nesbitt | HSV Coupé GTS | | | | 31st | 32nd | | | | | | | | | | | 60 |
| | Mike Reedy | Lotus Exige S | | | | | | | DNS | DNS | | | | | | | | |

| Colour | Result |
|---|---|
| Gold | Winner |
| Silver | Second place |
| Bronze | Third place |
| Green | Points classification |
| Blue | Non-points classification |
| Blue | Non-classified finish (NC) |
| Purple | Retired, not classified (Ret) |
| Red | Did not qualify (DNQ) |
| Red | Did not pre-qualify (DNPQ) |
| Black | Disqualified (DSQ) |
| White | Did not start (DNS) |
| White | Withdrew (WD) |
| White | Race cancelled (C) |
| Blank | Did not practice (DNP) |
| Blank | Did not arrive (DNA) |
| Blank | Excluded (EX) |

Note: No points were awarded for the third race at Albert Park as the race was stopped due to incidents on the first lap.

== Australian Tourist Trophy ==
The 2009 Australian Tourist Trophy was awarded by the Confederation of Australian Motor Sport to the driver gaining the highest aggregate points total in the Eastern Creek and Phillip Island rounds of the 2009 Australian GT Championship. The title, which was the twentieth Australian Tourist Trophy, was won by David Wall driving a Porsche 911 GT3 Cup S Type 997.
