= 2011 Australian GT Championship =

Motor racing competition

Seasons
- ← 2010 2012 →

The 2011 Australian GT Championship was an Australian motor racing competition open to closed, production based sports cars which are either approved by the FIA for GT3 competition or approved by the Confederation of Australian Motor Sport (CAMS) for Australian GT. It was sanctioned by CAMS as a National Championship with the Australian GT Sportscar Group Pty Ltd appointed by CAMS as the Category Manager. The championship, which was the 15th Australian GT Championship, incorporated drivers titles in two divisions, GT Championship and GT Challenge. The former GT Production division was merged into the GT Challenge division for 2011.

Mark Eddy won his second GT Championship. Driving his Melbourne Performance Centre prepared Audi R8 LMS the 2008 champion finished 36 points ahead of Klark Quinn (Mosler MT900 GT3 and Aston Martin DBRS9) and 99 points ahead of 2006 champion Greg Crick (Chrysler Viper GT3). Eddy only won one round, but it was the bonus point Phillip Island event at Round 5. Eddy also won races at Winton and Bathurst. Quinn won two races at the street circuits of Adelaide and Townsville, but fell behind Eddy after failing to finish in the second race at Phillip Island. Crick fell behind Eddy after failing to score any points at Bathurst. Peter Hackett, Dean Grant and Kevin Weeks all claimed race wins during the course of the season.

The GT Challenge division was won by Porsche driver Peter Boylan, defeating Lotus driver Tim Poulton by 63 points. They were the only two GT Challenge drivers to complete more than half of the season.

== Drivers ==
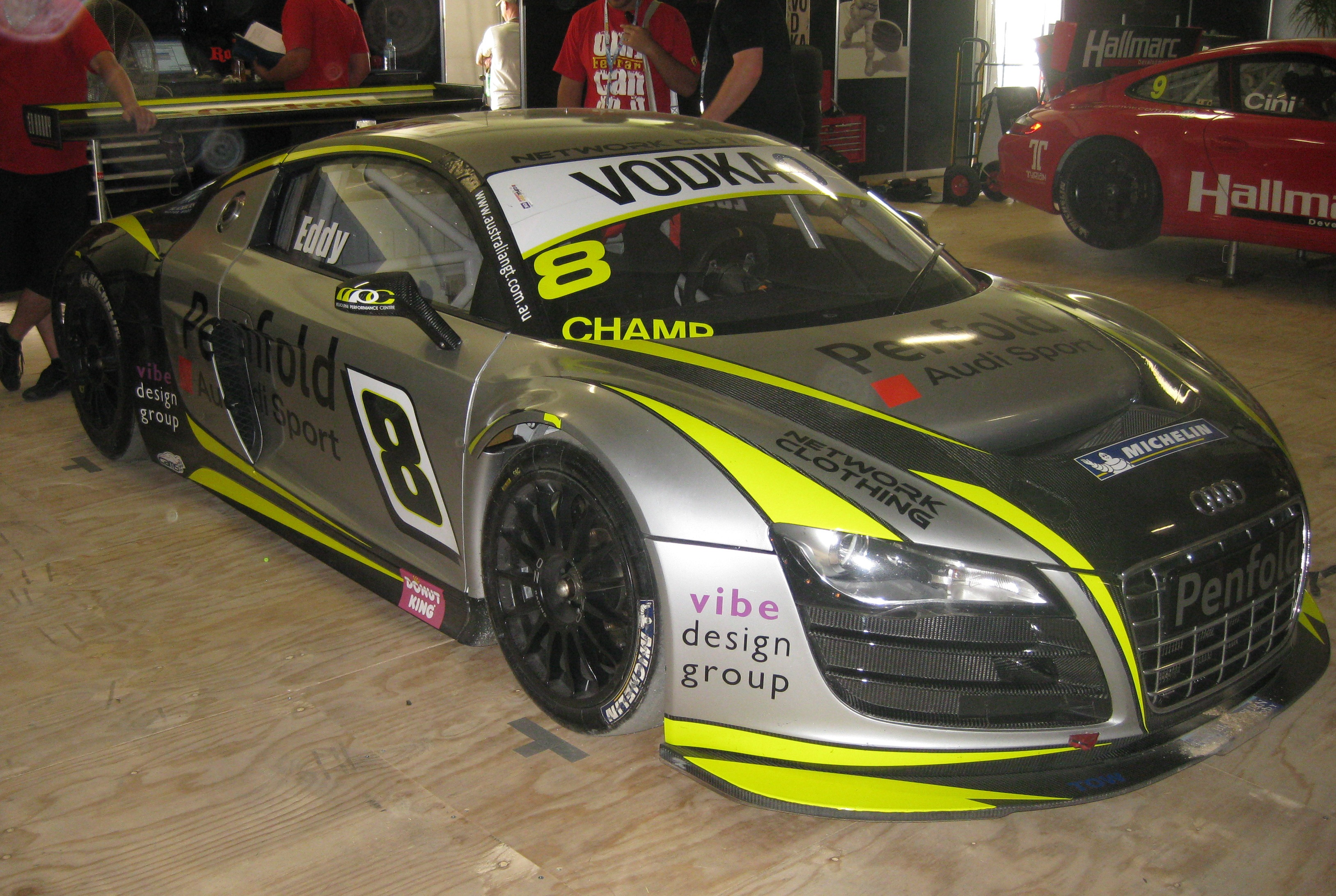
Marc Eddy won the championship driving an Audi R8 LMS

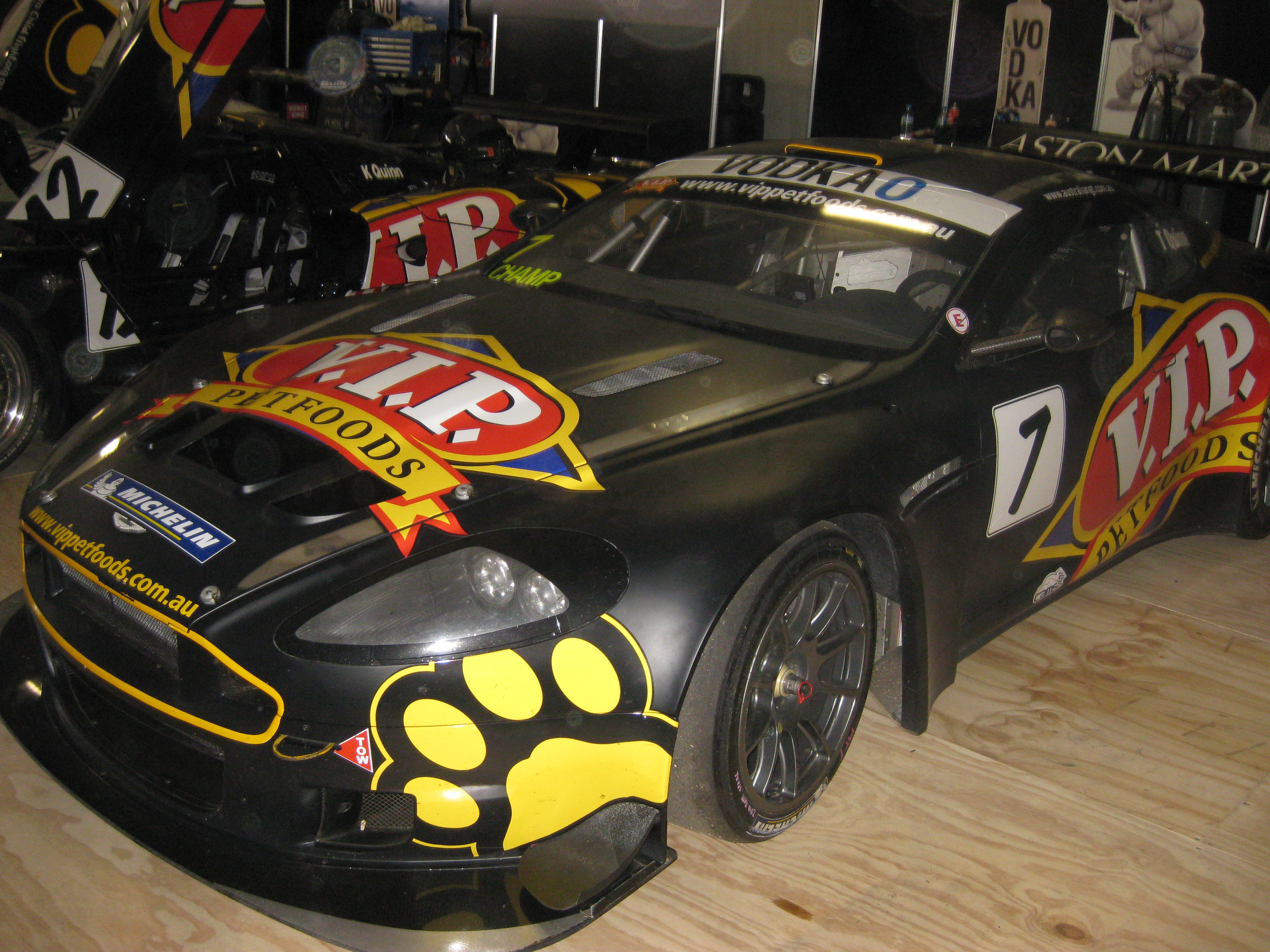
Tony Quinn placed eighth driving an Aston Martin DBRS9

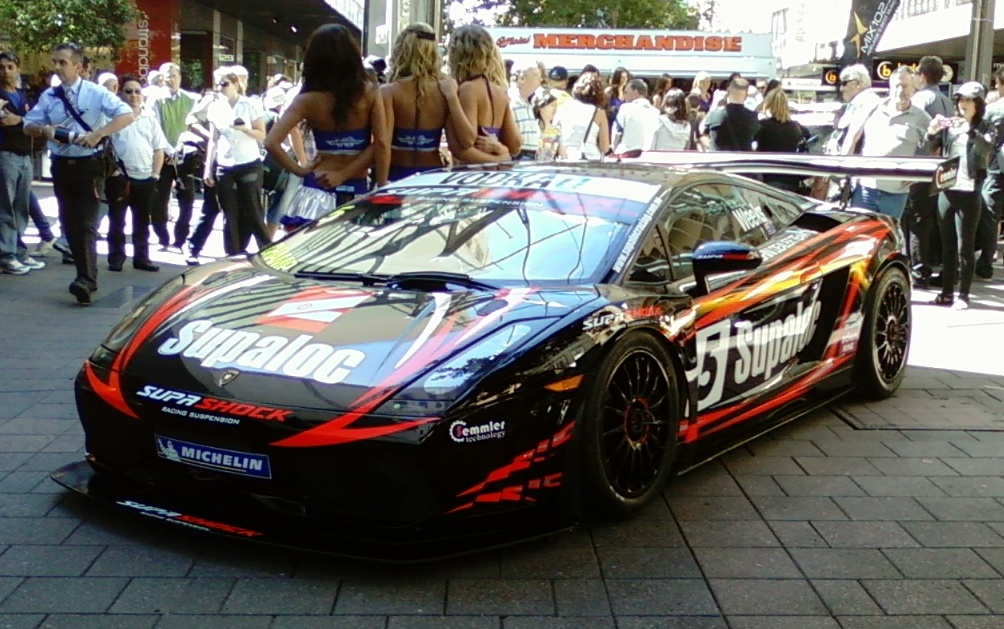
Kevin Weeks placed tenth driving a Lamborghini Gallardo

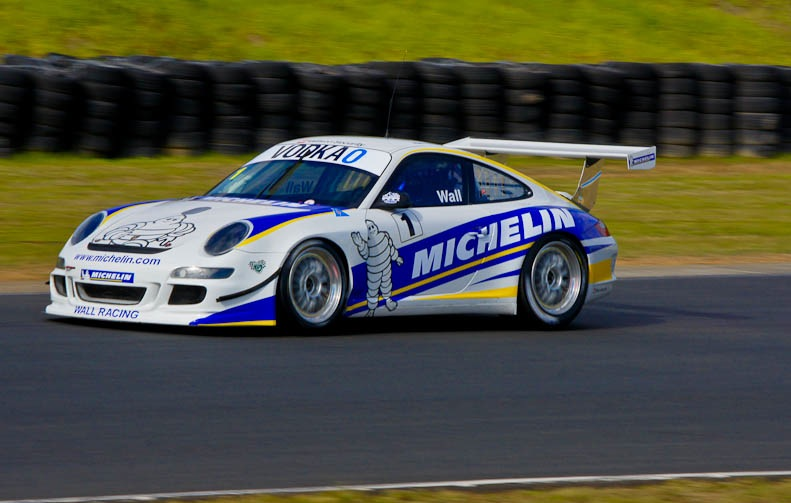
David Wall placed 17th driving a Porsche 911 GT3 Cup S Type 997

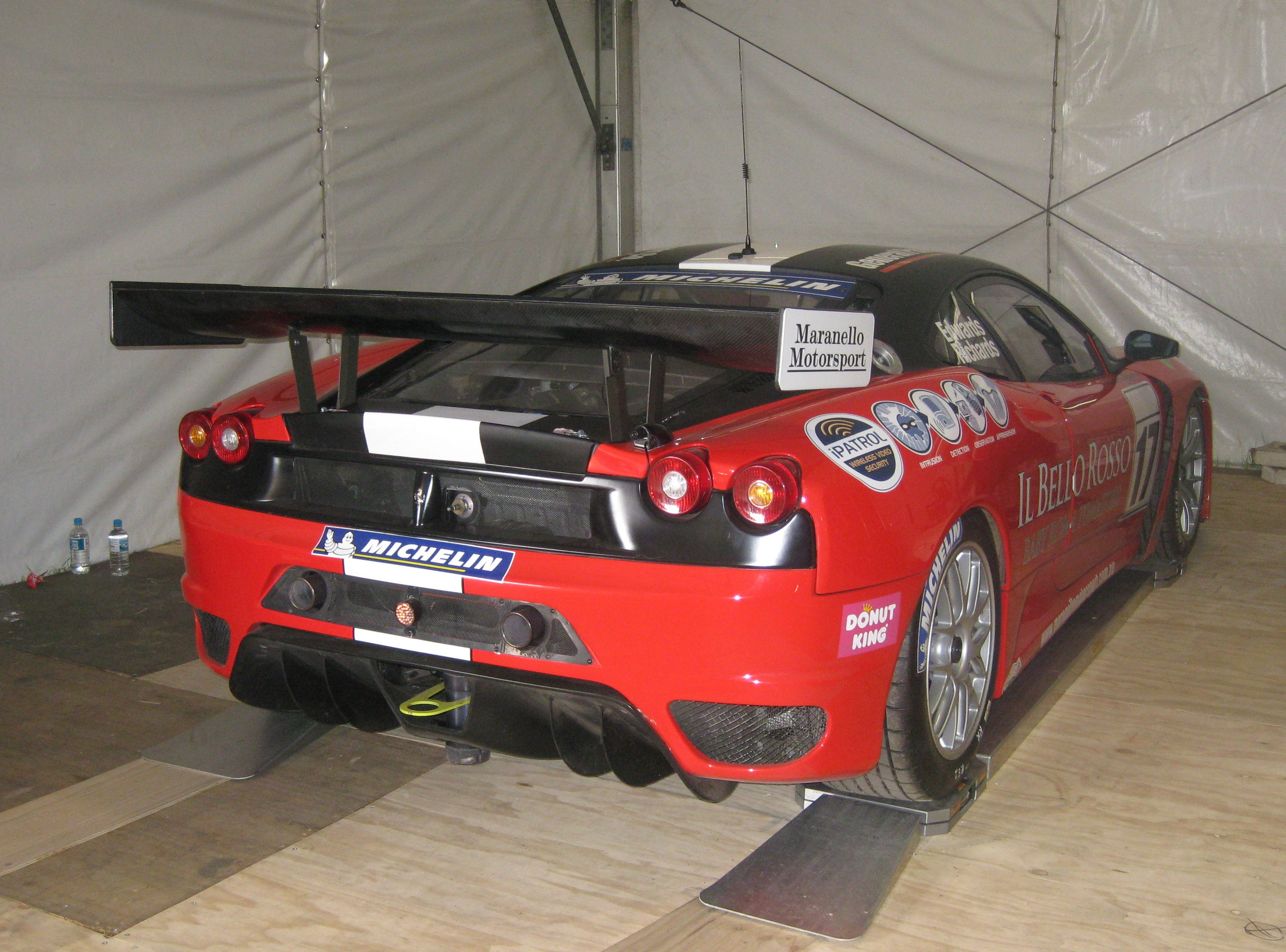
Peter Edwards placed 18th driving a Ferrari 430

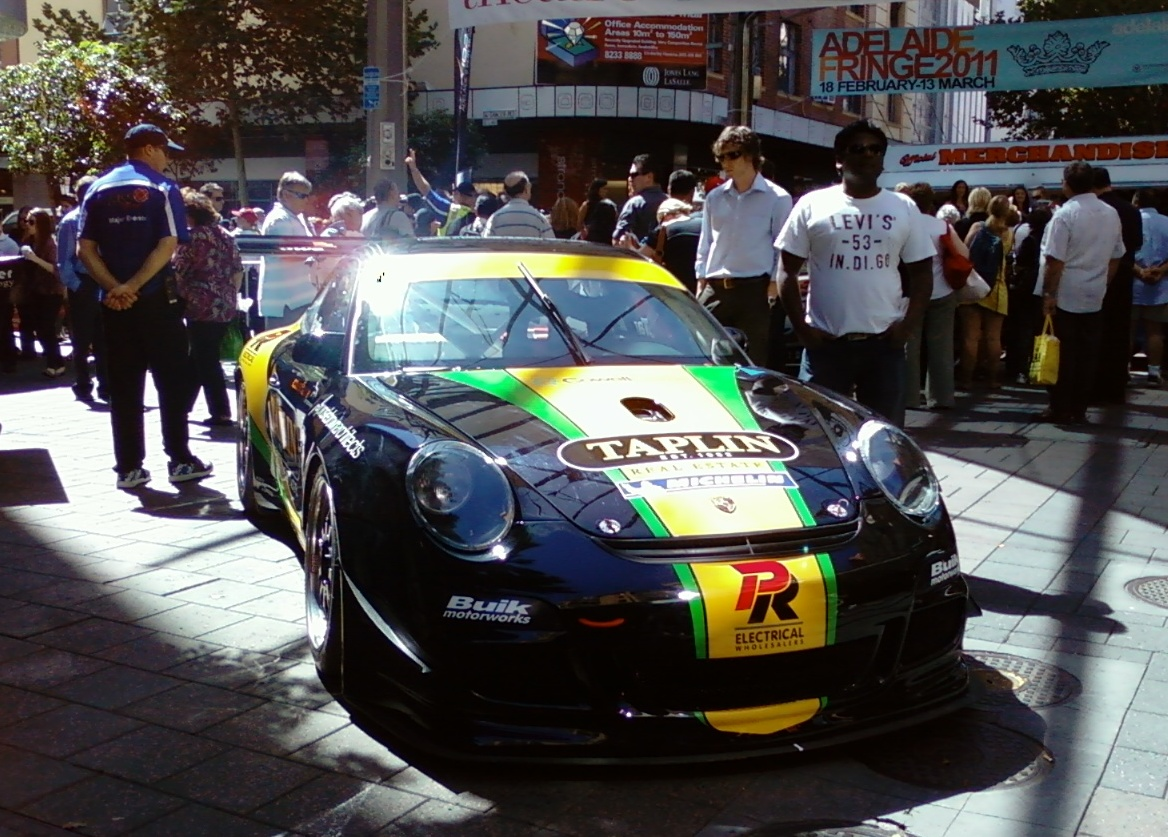
Andrew Taplin placed 21st driving a Porsche 911 GT3 Cup Type 997

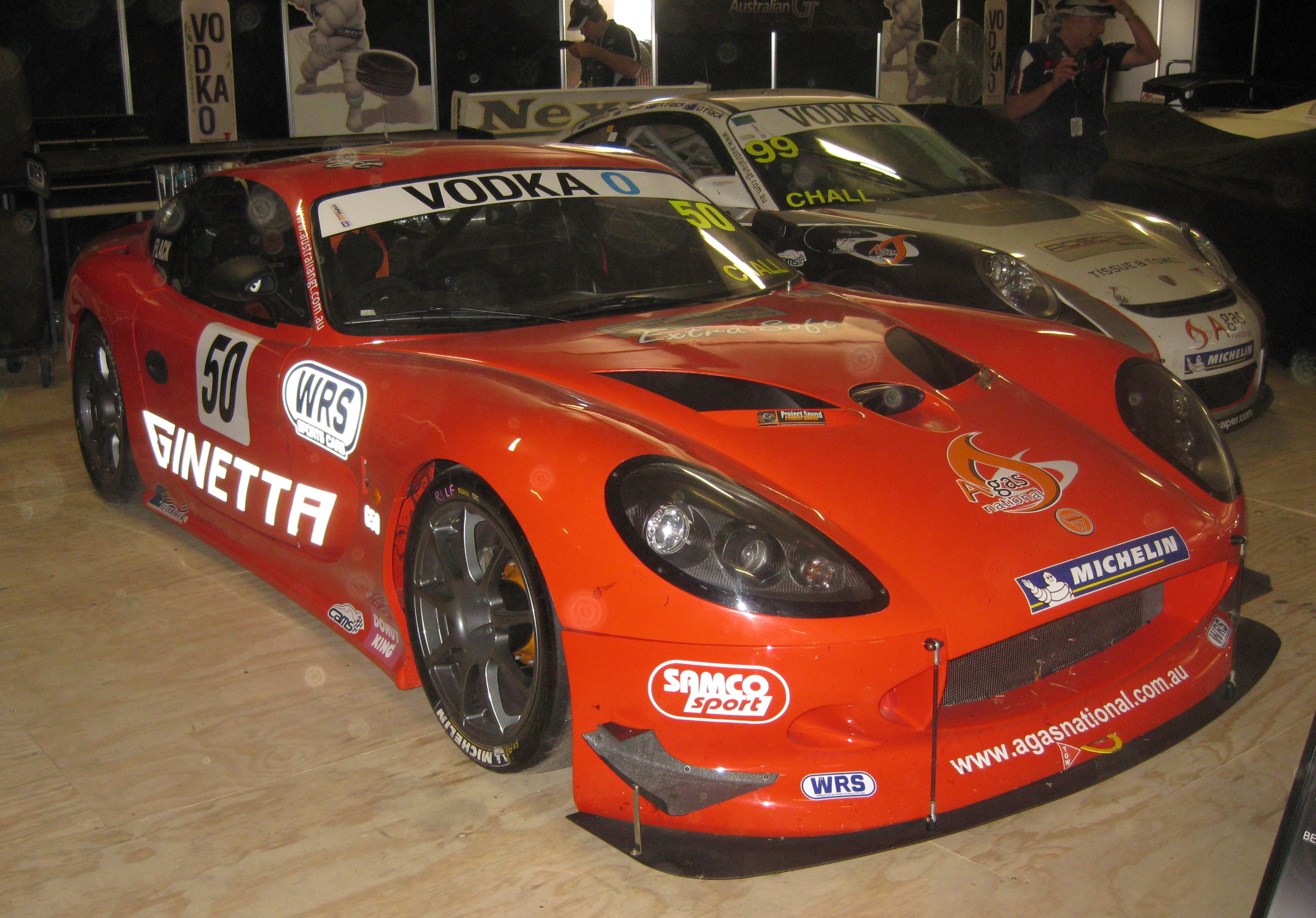
Adrian Flack placed fifth in the GT Challenge division driving a Ginetta G50 HC (pictured) and a Porsche 911 GT3 Cup Type 997

The following drivers contested the 2011 Australian GT Championship.

Driver	No	Car	Division
(Australia) David Wall	1	Porsche 911 GT3 Cup S Type 997	Championship
(Australia) Dean Grant (New Zealand) Daniel Gaunt	2	Porsche 911 GT3 Cup S Type 997; Mosler MT900 GT3	Championship
(Australia) Andrew Taplin	3	Porsche 911 GT3 Cup S Type 997	Championship
(Australia) Nathan Tinkler	3	Porsche 911 GT3 Cup Type 997	Challenge
(Australia) Peter Hackett	4; 63	Lamborghini Gallardo GT3; Mercedes-Benz SLS AMG GT3	Championship
(Australia) Stephen Grove	4	Porsche 911 GT3 Cup Type 997	Challenge
(Australia) Kevin Weeks (Australia) Josh Hunt	5	Lamborghini Gallardo GT3	Championship
(Australia) Jordan Ormsby	6	Porsche 911 GT3-RS Type 996	Challenge
(United Kingdom) Tony Quinn	7	Aston Martin DBRS9	Championship
(Australia) Mark Eddy	8	Audi R8 LMS	Championship
(Australia) Marc Cini (New Zealand) Craig Baird	9	Porsche 911 GT3 Cup S Type 997	Championship
(Australia) Mark O'Connor	10	Lotus Exige S	Challenge
(Australia) Mark Seamons	11	Lamborghini Gallardo GT3	Championship
(Australia) Klark Quinn	12; 7	Mosler MT900 GT3; Aston Martin DBRS9	Championship
(Tonga) Jon Tupou	14	Porsche 911 GT3 Cup Type 997	Challenge
(Australia) Peter Edwards (New Zealand) Jason Richards	17	Ferrari F430 GT3	Championship
(Australia) Ian Palmer	20	Dodge Viper GT3	Championship
(Australia) Peter Boylan	21	Porsche 911 GT3 Cup Type 997	Challenge
(Australia) Ash Samadi	22	Mosler MT900 GT3	Championship
(Australia) Rob Knight (Australia) Marcus Marshall	25	Porsche 911 GT3 Cup Type 997	Challenge
(Australia) John Modystach (New Zealand) Jonny Reid	26	Porsche 911 GT3 Cup Type 997	Challenge
(Australia) Nick O'Halloran (Denmark) Allan Simonsen (New Zealand) Jason Richards	27; 88	Ferrari F430 GT3; Lamborghini Gallardo GT3	Championship
(Australia) Indiran Padayachee	35	Porsche 911 GT3 Cup Type 997	Challenge
(Australia) Ben Eggleston	38	Aston Martin DBRS9	Championship
(Australia) Richard Bennett	39	Porsche 911 GT3 Cup Type 997	Challenge
(Australia) Paul Tresidder	39	Porsche 911 GT3 Cup Type 997	Challenge
(Australia) Mike Reedy	46	Lotus Exige S	Challenge
(Australia) Adrian Flack (Australia) Lindsay Yelland	50	Ginetta G50 HC	Challenge
(Australia) Andrew MacPherson (Australia) Mike Reedy	51	Mosler MT900 GT3; Lotus Exige S	Championship; Challenge
(Australia) Greg Crick	55	Dodge Viper GT3	Championship
(Australia) Richard Kimber (Australia) Des Wall	58	Dodge Viper GT3	Championship
(Australia) Timothy Poulton (Australia) Stig Richards	61	Lotus Exige S	Challenge
(Australia) Dean Koutsoumidis	71	Porsche 911 GT3 Cup Type 997	Challenge
(United Kingdom) Rob Sherrard	75	Dodge Viper GT3	Championship
(Australia) Victor Zagame	88	Porsche 911 GT3 Cup Type 997	Challenge
(Australia) Angelo Lazaris (Australia) Barton Mawer	98	Lotus Exige GT3	Championship
(Australia) Damien Flack (Australia) Adrian Flack	99	Porsche 911 GT3 Cup Type 997	Challenge

== Race calendar ==
The championship was contested over a seven-round series.

Rd.	Circuit	City / state	Date	Winner	
Rd.	Circuit	City / state	Date	Championship	Challenge
1	Adelaide Street Circuit	Adelaide, South Australia	17–20 March	Klark Quinn	Damien Flack
2	Winton Motor Raceway	Benalla, Victoria	20–22 May	Dean Grant	Lindsay Yelland
3	Eastern Creek Raceway	Sydney, New South Wales	28–30 May	David Wall	Peter Boylan
4	Townsville Street Circuit	Townsville, Queensland	8–10 July	Klark Quinn	Peter Boylan
5	Phillip Island Grand Prix Circuit	Phillip Island, Victoria	2–4 September	Mark Eddy	John Modystach; Jonny Reid
6	Mount Panorama Circuit	Bathurst, New South Wales	6–9 October	Klark Quinn	Mark O'Connor
7	Sandown Raceway	Melbourne, Victoria	18–20 November	Greg Crick	Dean Koutsoumidis

== Points system ==
Points were awarded in each division at each race according to the following table.

Position	1st	2nd	3rd	4th	5th	6th	7th	8th	9th	10th	11th	12th	13th	14th	15th	16th	17th	18th	19th	20th	21st	22nd	23rd	24th	25th	26th	27th	28th	29th	30th	31st	32nd	33rd	34th	35th
Points	57	53	50	48	47	46	45	44	43	42	41	40	39	38	37	36	35	34	33	32	31	30	29	28	27	26	25	24	23	22	21	20	19	18	17

For Round 5 of the championship only, points were also awarded to each driver based on their fastest lap time achieved in qualifying relative to the other drivers within their division of the championship, in accordance with the above table.

The results for each round of the championship were determined by the number of points scored by each driver within their division at that round.

The driver gaining the highest points total over all rounds of the Championship within their division was declared the winner of that division.

== Championship results ==
Pos	Driver	Car	Round 1 – ADE		Round 2 – WIN		Round 3 – EAS		Round 4 – TOW		Round 5 – PHI			Round 6 – BAT		Round 7 – SAN		Pen.	Pts
Pos	Driver	Car	60 min race	30 min race	30 min race	60 min race	60 min race	60 min race	30 min race	30 min race	Qualifying	60 min race	60 min race	30 min race	30 min race	30 min race	30 min race	Pen.	Pts
GT Championship
1	Mark Eddy	Audi R8 LMS	2nd	3rd	1st	4th	3rd	6th	4th	6th	1st	1st	2nd	4th	1st	8th	6th		761
2	Klark Quinn	Mosler MT900 GT3; Aston Martin DBRS9	1st	1st	2nd	2nd	6th	5th	1st	3rd	7th	2nd	Ret	2nd	2nd	3rd	3rd		725
3	Greg Crick	Dodge Viper GT3	3rd	2nd	6th	5th	1st	7th	3rd	4th	2nd	4th	3rd	Ret	DNS	1st	1st		662
4	Peter Hackett	Lamborghini Gallardo GT3; Mercedes-Benz SLS AMG GT3	Ret	6th			DSQ	2nd	2nd	2nd	3rd	3rd	1st	1st	9th	2nd	2nd		570
5	Ash Samadi	Mosler MT900 GT3	5th	5th	5th	7th	Ret	9th	5th	5th	6th	Ret	4th	DNS	5th	6th	Ret		511
6	Ian Palmer	Dodge Viper GT3					7th	8th	10th	9th	10th	5th	5th	6th	7th	11th	8th		489
7	Dean Grant	Porsche 911 GT3 Cup S Type 997; Mosler MT900 GT3	4th	12th	3rd	1st	5th	4th	9th	7th	DNS	DNS	DNS			4th	Ret		430
8	Tony Quinn	Aston Martin DBRS9	Ret	4th	7th	DNS	Ret	DNS	7th	Ret	13th	2nd	Ret	3rd	4th	7th	4th		421
9	Marc Cini	Porsche 911 GT3 Cup S Type 997	9th	8th	Ret	3rd			8th	8th						9th	7th		315
10	Kevin Weeks	Lamborghini Gallardo	Ret	DNS			4th	DNS	6th	1st	5th	Ret	DSQ	Ret	3rd				248
11	Nick O'Halloran	Ferrari F430 GT3; Lamborghini Gallardo GT3	Ret	10th	9th	8th										5th	5th		224
12	Angelo Lazaris	Lotus Exige GT3	6th	Ret	12th	9th			Ret	Ret	9th	7th	DNS						220
13	Daniel Gaunt	Porsche 911 GT3 Cup S Type 997; Mosler MT900 GT3	4th	DNS	DNS	1st	5th	4th			DNS	DNS	DNS						202
14	Mark Seamons	Lamborghini Gallardo GT3			14th	Ret					11th	10th	6th						172
15	Barton Mawer	Lotus Exige GT3			DNS	9th					4th	7th	DNS						132
16	Rob Sherrard	Dodge Viper GT3									12th	9th	9th						130
17	David Wall	Porsche 911 GT3 Cup S Type 997					2nd	1st											110
18	Peter Edwards	Ferrari F430 GT3	Ret	Ret	8th	6th													90
19	Craig Baird	Porsche 911 GT3 Cup S Type 997			DNS	3rd													50
20	Ben Eggleston	Aston Martin DBRS9			4th	Ret													48
21	Andrew Taplin	Porsche 911 GT3 Cup S Type 997	DSQ	7th															45
22	Jason Richards	Ferrari F430 GT3	Ret	DNS	DNS	8th													44
22	Andrew Macpherson	Mosler MT900 GT3	Ret	DNS			8th	DNS								10th	11th		44
22	Mike Reedy	Mosler MT900 GT3					8th	DNS											44
22	Josh Hunt	Lamborghini Gallardo GT3									8th	Ret	DSQ						44
26	Richard Kimber	Dodge Viper GT3					11th	DNS											43
26	Des Wall	Dodge Viper GT3					11th	DNS											43
	Allan Simonsen	Ferrari F430 GT3	Ret	DNS															0
GT Challenge
1	Peter Boylan	Porsche 911 GT3 Cup Type 997	10th	14th			9th	11th	11th	10th	5th	11th	8th	Ret	DNS	14th	10th		571
2	Tim Poulton	Lotus Exige S	11th	13th	11th	11th	10th	10th	Ret	DNS	6th	Ret	Ret	8th	10th	13th	Ret		510
3	Damien Flack	Porsche 911 GT3 Cup Type 997	6th	9th			Ret	3rd			2nd	8th	Ret						281
4	Stig Richards	Lotus Exige S	11th	DNS	DNS	11th	10th	10th			8th	Ret	Ret						252
5	Adrian Flack	Ginetta G50 HC; Porsche 911 GT3 Cup Type 997	7th	11th							3rd	8th	Ret						212
6	John Modystach	Porsche 911 GT3 Cup Type 997									4th	6th	7th						164
7	Lindsay Yelland	Ginetta G50 HC			10th	10th													114
7	Dean Koutsoumidis	Porsche 911 GT3 Cup Type 997														12th	9th		114
9	Mark O'Connor	Lotus Exige S	DNS	Ret	Ret	DNS								5th	8th	Ret	DNS		110
10	Andrew Macpherson	Lotus Exige S												11th	6th				104
11	Nathan Tinkler	Porsche 911 GT3 Cup Type 997												7th	12th				100
12	Stephen Grove	Porsche 911 GT3 Cup Type 997														15th	12th		98
13	Paul Tresidder	Porsche 911 GT3 Cup Type 997												9th	11th				96
14	Richard Bennett	Porsche 911 GT3 Cup Type 997	12th	15th															94
15	Indiran Padayachee	Porsche 911 GT3 Cup Type 997												DSQ	13th				46
15	Jon Tupou	Porsche 911 GT3 Cup Type 997									7th	DNS	DNS						46
	Victor Zagame	Porsche 911 GT3 Cup Type 997			13th	Ret													0
	Jordan Ormsby	Porsche 911 GT3-RS Type 996	Ret	DNS															0
	Mike Reedy	Lotus Exige S	Ret	DNS															0
	Rob Knight	Porsche 911 GT3 Cup Type 997									DNS	DNS	DNS						0
	Marcus Marshall	Porsche 911 GT3 Cup Type 997									DNS	DNS	DNS						0
	Jonny Reid	Porsche 911 GT3 Cup Type 997									1st	6th	7th						0

Colour	Result
Gold	Winner
Silver	Second place
Bronze	Third place
Green	Points classification
Blue	Non-points classification
Blue	Non-classified finish (NC)
Purple	Retired, not classified (Ret)
Red	Did not qualify (DNQ)
Red	Did not pre-qualify (DNPQ)
Black	Disqualified (DSQ)
White	Did not start (DNS)
White	Withdrew (WD)
White	Race cancelled (C)
Blank	Did not practice (DNP)
Blank	Did not arrive (DNA)
Blank	Excluded (EX)

== 2011 Australian Tourist Trophy ==
The 2011 Australian Tourist Trophy was awarded by the Confederation of Australian Motor Sport to the driver accumulating the highest aggregate points total from the Eastern Creek and Phillip Island "endurance" rounds of the championship. The title, which was the 22nd Australian Tourist Trophy, was won by Mark Eddy driving an Audi R8 LMS.
