= 2016 Hampton Downs 101 =

Seasons
- ← none 2017 →

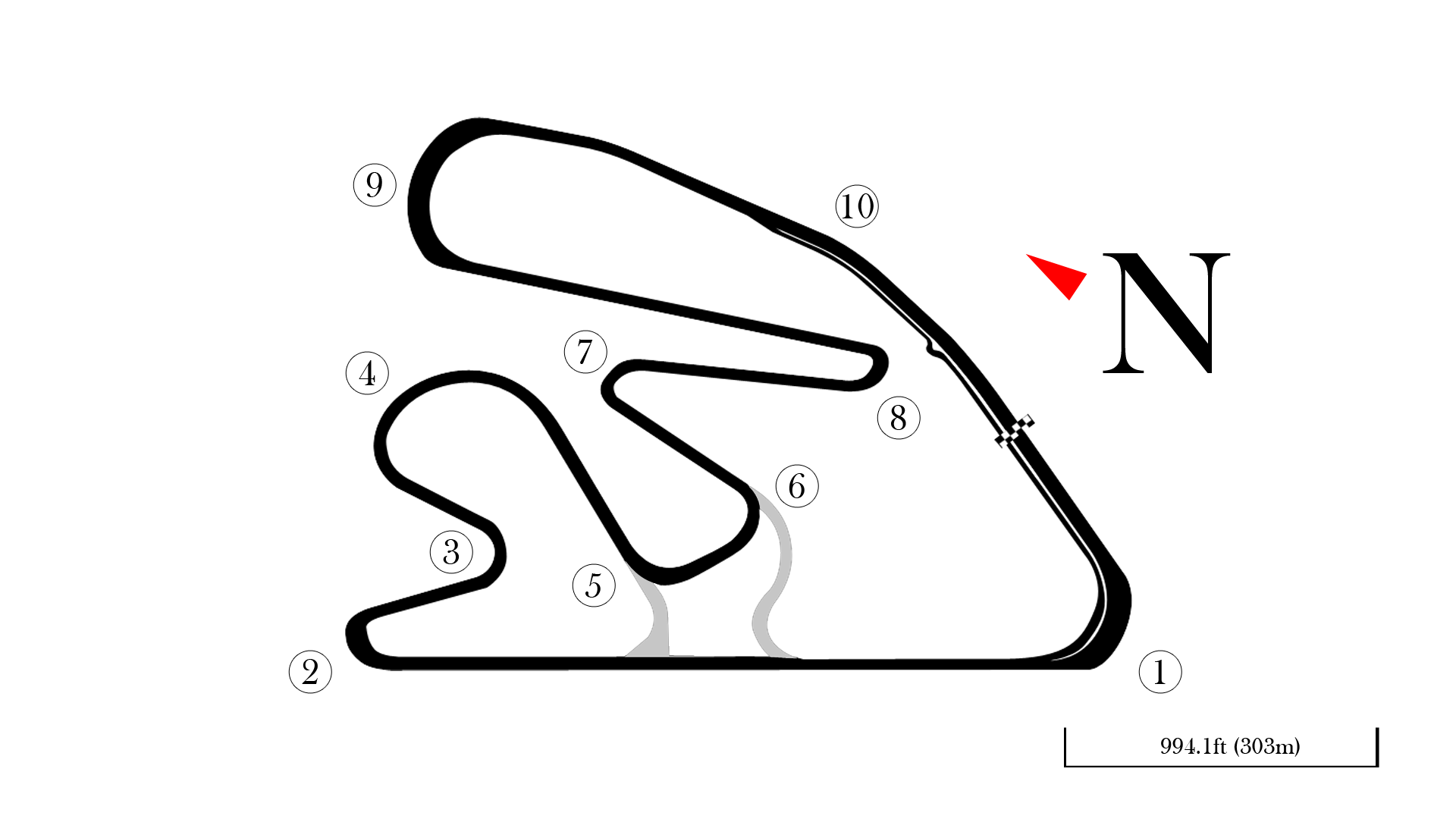

The 2016 Hampton Downs 101 was an endurance race staged at the Hampton Downs Motorsport Park, in North Waikato, New Zealand on 27 October. It was the first running of the Hampton Downs 101 and served as the penultimate round of the 2016 Australian GT Championship.

The race was won by Roger Lago and David Russell, driving the JBS Australia Lamborghini Gallardo R-EX.

== Official results ==
Pos.	No.	Team / Entrant	Drivers	Car	Laps
1	23	JBS Australia	(Australia) Roger Lago (Australia) David Russell	Lamborghini Gallardo R-EX	101
2	911	Walkinshaw Racing	(Australia) John Martin (Australia) Duvashen Padayachee	Porsche 991 GT3-R	101
3	2	JAMEC PEM Racing	(Australia) Daniel Bilski (Australia) Garth Tander	Audi R8 LMS Ultra	101
4	6	Skwirk Online Education	(Australia) Liam Talbot (Australia) Jake Fouracre	Audi R8 LMS Ultra	101
5	59	Tekno Autosports	(Australia) Grant Denyer (Australia) Nathan Morcom	McLaren 650S GT3	101
6	1	JAMEC PEM Racing	(Australia) Tony Bates (Germany) Christopher Mies	Audi R8 LMS	101
7	63	Eggleston Motorsport	(Australia) Peter Hackett (New Zealand) Dominic Storey	Mercedes-AMG GT3	100
8	37	Darrell Lea	(Australia) Klark Quinn (New Zealand) "Mad" Mike Whiddett	McLaren 650S GT3	100
9	3	Bondi Wholefoods	(Australia) Ash Samadi (Australia) Tony D'Alberto	Audi R8 LMS	99
10	7	Darrell Lea	(United Kingdom) Tony Quinn (New Zealand) Greg Murphy	McLaren 650S GT3	99
11	30	Clark Proctor Racing	(New Zealand) Clark Proctor (New Zealand) Andrew Porter	Nissan GT-R Nismo GT3	99
12	8	Maranello Motorsport	(Australia) Aaron Deitz (Australia) Cameron McConville	Ferrari 458 GT3	98
13	4	Supabarn Supermarkets	(Australia) Theo Koundouris (Australia) Marcus Marshall	Audi R8 LMS	98
14	33	HBS Motorsports	(New Zealand) Simon Ellingham (New Zealand) Tim Miles	Audi R8 LMS Ultra	98
15	100	BMW Team SRM	(New Zealand) Steven Richards (Australia) Max Twigg	BMW M6 GT3	97
16	123	Nick Chester Racing	(New Zealand) Nick Chester (New Zealand) John De Veth	Chevrolet Camaro GT3	92
17	5	Adina Apartment Hotels	(Australia) Greg Taylor (Australia) Nathan Antunes	Audi R8 LMS	88
Ret	88	Maranello Motorsport	(Australia) Peter Edwards (New Zealand) Graham Smythe	Ferrari 488 GT3	100
Ret	19	Griffith Corporation	(Australia) Mark Griffith (Australia) Jack Perkins	Mercedes-AMG GT3	98
Ret	96	Miedecke Motor Group	(New Zealand) Richard Moore (Australia) Tony Longhurst	Aston Martin Vantage GT3	89
Ret	51	AMAC Motorsport	(Australia) Andrew Macpherson (Australia) Brad Shiels	Porsche 997 GT3-R	69
Ret	95	Miedecke Motor Group	(Australia) George Miedecke (Australia) Andrew Miedecke	Aston Martin Vantage GT3	66
Ret	35	Nissan Motorsport	(Australia) Matthew Simmons (Australia) Michael Caruso	Nissan GT-R Nismo GT3	44
WD	222	Scotty Taylor Motorsports	(Australia) Scott Taylor (New Zealand) Craig Baird	Mercedes-AMG GT3	-
WD	27	Trass Family Motorsport	(New Zealand) Danny Stutterd (New Zealand) Sam Fillmore	Ferrari 458 Italia	-
