= Klark Quinn =

Australian racing driver (born 1982)

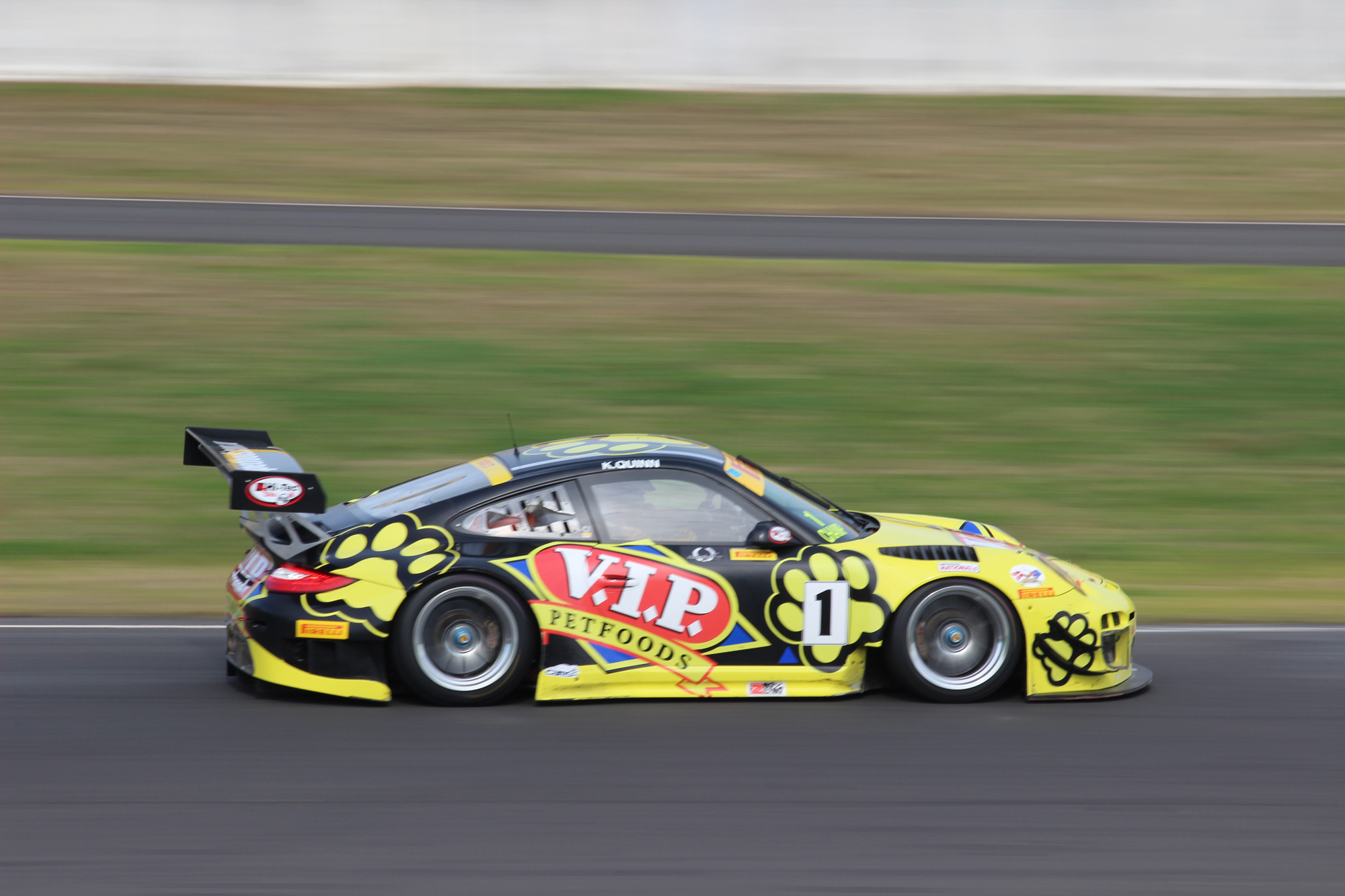
- Quinn in 2013
- Nationality: (Australia) Australian
- Born: 12 May 1982 (age 44) Gold Coast, Queensland, Australia
- Relatives: Ryder Quinn (son)
- Categorisation: FIA Silver (until 2017); FIA Gold (2018–)

Championship titles
- 2012-2013, 2016: Australian GT Championship

Klark Quinn (born 12 May 1982) is an Australian businessman and racing driver who last competed in the Bathurst 12 Hour for Quinn Racing Team MPC.

== Personal life ==
Quinn is the son of Tony Quinn, a British-born businessman and racing driver, founder of the Tony Quinn Foundation and the Quinn Group, who also owned the Australian GT Championship from mid-2011 to mid-2018. His brother Kent and son Ryder, with whom he raced at the 2026 Bathurst 12 Hour along with Tony, are also racing drivers.

== Business ventures ==
In September of 2012, Quinn acquired Darrell Lea, nearly two months after it went into voluntary administration, and ran it until 2018 when Quadrant Private Equity took over the company. Six years later, Quinn purchased Sara Lee Australia in February of 2024, four months after the company went into voluntary administration.

== Career ==
Quinn began his racing career in 2001, by racing in Formula Ford Queensland and finishing third in points, as well as select appearances in the Australian Formula Ford Championship and the Class B of the Australian GT Production Car Championship. Another season in Formula Ford Queensland then followed, in which he finished third in points for the second year in a row, as well as racing part-time in Australian Formula Ford, and finishing second in the Bathurst 24 Hour in Class 9 for Novocastrian Motorsport.

In 2003, Quinn joined RT Motorsport to race in the second half of the Australian Carrera Cup Championship, taking a best result of third in race three at Surfers Paradise to end the year 13th in points. Towards the end of the year, Quinn returned to the Bathurst 24 Hour, finishing second in the B class for VIP Petfoods Racing. Remaining with the latter team for his sophomore season in the Australian Carrera Cup Championship, Quinn took a lone podium in race three at Bathurst, which helped him end the year fifth in the overall standings. Continuing in the series for 2005, Quinn took a best result of second four times, including in all three races at Surfers Paradise en route to seventh in points. During 2005, Quinn also finished second in the Gemini One Hour Race.

Two seasons in Australian Carrera Cup then ensued, in which Quinn finished 13th and 12th in points, as he took a best result of sixth in race two at Albert Park in 2006. During both years, Quinn also raced at the 24 Hours of Nürburgring, finishing sixth in the SP7 class in 2006, and seventh in class the following year. In 2008, Quinn began the year by winning the Dubai 24 Hour overall, before finishing second in the Bathurst 12 Hour overall and later racing in the 24 Hours of Nürburgring in the SP7 class. The following year, Quinn mainly raced in the Australian GT Championship, winning all five of his starts in the Challenge class, and later scoring two overall podiums in the final five races after being moved to the Championship class. During 2009, Quinn also raced in the 24 Hours of Nürburgring, finishing third in the SP7 class and ninth overall.

After finishing sixth in the 2010 Malaysia Merdeka Endurance Race, Quinn returned to the Australian GT Championship the following year, winning both races at Adelaide and race one at Townsville to secure runner-up honors in the overall standings. Returning for the 2012 season with a Porsche 911, Quinn won both races in Adelaide and Surfers Paradise and five other podiums to secure his maiden Australian GT title. Continuing in the series for 2013, Quinn won twice at Queensland and finished on the podium in the other nine races to seal his second consecutive Australian GT title by 104 points over his father Tony. During 2013, Quinn also returned to the Bathurst 12 Hour, finishing third overall alongside Matt Kingsley and Shane van Gisbergen, also for his father's VIP Petfoods Racing outfit.

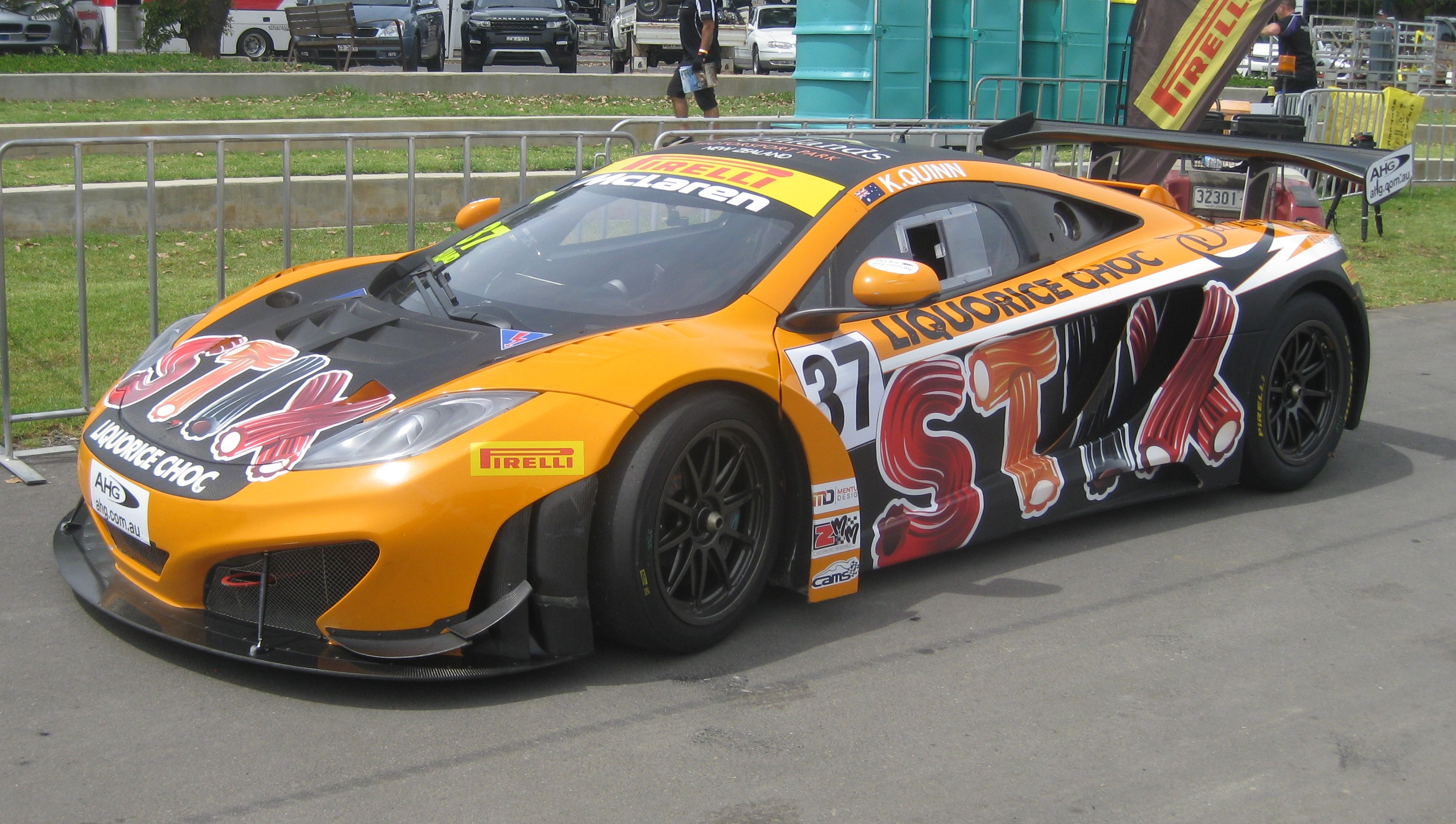
McLaren MP4-12C of Quinn at the opening round of AGTC at Adelaide in 2015.

Remaining with the family-owned team as they switched to McLaren machinery for 2014, Quinn finished fourth in the Bathurst 12 Hour, before returning to Australian GT for the rest of the year, taking a lone win at Townsville and four other podiums to end the year fourth in points. Returning for the 2015 season, Quinn scored a lone win at Adelaide with the MP4-12C, before switching to the 650S for the final four rounds, in which he won race one at Highlands to finish third in points. The day after the Australian GT season finale at the same venue, Quinn won the non-championship Highlands 101 alongside Van Gisbergen.

Continuing with the now-named Keltic Racing for the 2016 season, Quinn took a lone win at Townsville and four other podiums en route to his third Australian GT title, shortly before announcing his step back from full-time racing to focus on his family. Following that, Quinn raced in the Bathurst 12 Hour the following year alongside Tony Quinn, Grant Denyer and Andrew Waite. Nine years later, Quinn made a brief return to racing, competing in the Bathurst 12 Hour with his father Tony, his brother Kent and his son Ryder, as they finished eighth in class driving an Audi R8 LMS Evo II.

== Racing record ==
=== Racing career summary ===
Season	Series	Team	Races	Wins	Poles	F/Laps	Podiums	Points	Position
2001	Formula Ford Queensland							186	3rd
2001	Australian Formula Ford Championship	Tony Quinn	2	0	0	0	0	0	NC
2001	Australian GT Production Car Championship – Class B							5	18th
2002	Formula Ford Queensland							188	3rd
2002	Australian Formula Ford Championship	VIP Petfoods	1	0	0	0	0	0	NC
2002	Sandown 500 – B	Nilsson Motor Sport	1	0	0	0	0	—N/a	DNF
2002	Bathurst 24 Hour – 9	Novocastrian Motorsport	1	0	0	0	1	—N/a	2nd
2003	Australian Carrera Cup Championship	RT Motorsport	12	0	0	0	1	318	13th
2003	Aussie Racing Cars Super Series	VIP Petfoods Racing	20	1	0	4	8		
2003	Bathurst 24 Hour – B	VIP Petfoods Racing	1	0	0	0	1	—N/a	2nd
2003	Queensland Sports Car Championship		1	1	1	1	1	12	8th
2003–04	Porsche GT3 Cup Trans-Tasman		2	0	0	0	0	60	14th
2004	Australian Carrera Cup Championship	VIP Petfoods	25	0	0	0	1	564	5th
2004	Queensland Sports Car Championship		2	2	1	2	2	23	6th
2004–05	Battery Town Porsche GT3 Cup		3	0	0	0	0	148	19th
2005	Australian Carrera Cup Championship	VIP Petfoods	27	0	0	0	4	594	7th
2005	Gemini One Hour Race	Ashley Jarvis	1	0	0	0	1	—N/a	2nd
2006	Australian Carrera Cup Championship	VIP Petfoods	24	0	0	0	0	267	13th
2006	24 Hours of Nürburgring – SP7	VIP Petfoods	1	0	0	0	0	—N/a	6th
2006–07	Battery Town Porsche GT3 Cup Challenge		3	0	0	0	2	155	21st
2007	Dubai 24 Hour – A6	VIP Petfoods	1	0	0	0	0	—N/a	8th
2007	Australian Carrera Cup Championship	VIP Petfoods	24	0	0	0	0	291	12th
2007	24 Hours of Nürburgring – SP7	Juniper Racing	1	0	0	0	0	—N/a	7th
2008	Dubai 24 Hour – A6	VIP Petfoods 1	1	0	0	0	1	—N/a	1st
2008	Bathurst 12 Hour – A	VIP Petfoods (Aust) PL	1	0	0	0	1	—N/a	2nd
2008	24 Hours of Nürburgring – SP7		1	0	0	0	0	—N/a	DNF
2009	Australian GT Championship – GT Challenge	VIP Petfoods Australia	5	5	0	0	5	190	7th
2009	Australian GT Championship – GT Championship	VIP Petfoods Australia	4	0	0	0	2	148.5	18th
2009	24 Hours of Nürburgring – SP7	VIP Petfoods Australia	1	0	0	0	1	—N/a	3rd
2010	Malaysia Merdeka Endurance Race	VIP Petfoods Racing	1	0	0	0	0	—N/a	6th
2010	Bathurst 12 Hour – A	VIP Petfoods Racing	1	0	0	0	0	—N/a	DNF
2010	Australian GT Championship – GT Championship	VIP Petfoods Racing	2	0	0	0	2	105	20th
2011	Bathurst 12 Hour – A	VIP Holdings (Aust) Pty Ltd	1	0	0	0	1	—N/a	3rd
2011	Australian GT Championship – GT Championship	VIP Petfoods Racing	14	3	2	3	11	725	2nd
2011	Australian Manufacturers' Championship	VIP Petfoods Racing	2	0	0	0	2	162	9th
2012	Australian GT Championship – GT Championship	VIP Petfoods Racing	14	4	1	0	9	186	1st
2012	Australian Manufacturers' Championship	VIP Petfoods Racing	1	0	1	0	0	2	53rd
2013	Bathurst 12 Hour – A	VIP Petfoods Racing	1	0	0	0	1	—N/a	3rd
2013	Australian GT Championship – GT Championship	VIP Petfoods Racing	11	2	0	0	11	627	1st
2013	Aussie Racing Cars Super Series	VIP Petfoods Racing	3	0	0	0	0	28	60th
2014	Bathurst 12 Hour – A	VIP Petfoods Racing	1	0	0	0	0	—N/a	4th
2014	Australian GT Championship – GT Championship	VIP Petfoods Racing	10	1	0	0	5	352	4th
2014	Phillip Island 101	VIP Petfoods Racing	1	0	0	0	0	—N/a	5th
2014	Aussie Racing Cars Super Series		3	0	0	0	0	44	42nd
2015	Bathurst 12 Hour – AA	Keltic Racing	1	0	0	0	0	—N/a	DNF
2015	Australian GT Championship – GT Championship	VIP Holdings	11	2	0	0	4	531	3rd
2015	Highlands 101 – Sports Car	VIP Holdings	1	1	0	0	1	—N/a	1st
2016	Bathurst 12 Hour – AA	Keltic Racing	1	0	0	0	0	—N/a	DNF
2016	Intercontinental GT Challenge	Keltic Racing	1	0	0	0	0	0	NC
2016	Australian GT Championship	Keltic Racing	15	1	0	0	6	627	1st
2016	Australian Endurance Championship	Keltic Racing	4	0	1	0	1	332	7th
2016	Hampton Downs 101	Keltic Racing	1	0	0	0	0	—N/a	8th
2016	Highlands 101	Keltic Racing	1	0	0	0	0	—N/a	DNF
2017	Bathurst 12 Hour – AAM	Keltic Racing	1	0	0	0	0	—N/a	DNF
2017	Intercontinental GT Challenge	Keltic Racing	1	0	0	0	0	0	NC
2026	Bathurst 12 Hour – Bronze	Quinn Racing Team MPC	1	0	0	0	0	—N/a	8th

=== Complete 24 Hours of Nürburgring results ===
Year	Team	Co-Drivers	Car	Class	Laps	Pos.	Class Pos.
2006	(Australia) VIP Petfoods	(United Kingdom) Tony Quinn (New Zealand) Craig Baird (New Zealand) Kevin Bell	Porsche 911 GT3 RSR	SP7	137	9th	6th
2007	(Australia) Juniper Racing	(United Kingdom) Tony Quinn (New Zealand) Craig Baird (New Zealand) Kevin Bell	Porsche 911 GT3 RSR	SP7	100	12th	7th
2008		(United Kingdom) Tony Quinn (New Zealand) Craig Baird (Australia) Jonathon Webb	Porsche 911 GT3 RS	SP7	46	DNF	DNF
2009	VIP Petfoods Australia	(United Kingdom) Tony Quinn (New Zealand) Craig Baird (Australia) Grant Denyer	Porsche 997 RSR	SP7	146	9th	3rd

=== Complete Bathurst 12 Hours results ===
Year	Team	Co-Drivers	Car	Class	Laps	Pos.	Class Pos.
2008	(Australia) VIP Petfoods (Aust) PL	(United Kingdom) Tony Quinn (Australia) Grant Denyer	Mitsubishi Lancer Evo IX	A	253	2nd	2nd
2010	(Australia) VIP Petfoods	(United Kingdom) Tony Quinn (Australia) Max Twigg	Mitsubishi Lancer RS Evo IX	A	15	DNF	DNF
2011	(Australia) VIP Holdings (Aust) Pty Ltd	(United Kingdom) Tony Quinn (New Zealand) Craig Baird	Porsche 997 GT3 Cup R	A	291	3rd	3rd
2013	(Australia) VIP Holdings (Aust) Pty Ltd	(United Kingdom) Tony Quinn (New Zealand) Shane van Gisbergen (Australia) Matt Kingsley	Porsche 997 GT3 Cup R	A	267	3rd	3rd
2014	(Australia) VIP Holdings (Aust) Pty Ltd	(United Kingdom) Tony Quinn (New Zealand) Shane van Gisbergen (United Kingdom) Andrew Kirkaldy	McLaren MP4-12C GT3	A	296	4th	4th
2015	(Australia) Keltic Racing	(United Kingdom) Tony Quinn (France) Kévin Estre	McLaren MP4-12C GT3	AA	80	DNF	DNF
2016	(Australia) Keltic Racing	(United Kingdom) Tony Quinn (New Zealand) Craig Baird	McLaren 650S GT3	AA	171	DNF	DNF
2017	(Australia) Keltic Racing	(United Kingdom) Tony Quinn (Australia) Grant Denyer (New Zealand) Andrew Waite	McLaren 650S GT3	AAM	95	DNF	DNF
2026	(Australia) Quinn Racing Team MPC	(Australia) Tony Quinn (Australia) Kent Quinn (Australia) Ryder Quinn	Audi R8 LMS Evo II	GT3 Bronze	254	18th	8th
