= 2001 Australian GT Production Car Championship =

The 2001 Australian GT Production Car Championship was a CAMS sanctioned motor racing title open to production cars. It was the sixth Australian GT Production Car Championship to be awarded.

The Australian championship was won by Queensland driver Brett Peters, driving a Subaru Impreza WRX ran by the Rod Dawson led Peters Motorsport team. Peters took a 28.5 championship victory over fellow Subaru driver Wayne Boatwright with HSV driver Phillip Polities a further 21.5 points back in third.

The series ran on an eleven-round calendar but not all of the five classes raced at every meeting, with each class racing eight of the eleven rounds. The separated calendar was the beginning of the separation of competitors into what would become completely separate championships in 2003 as the Australian Performance Car Championship and Australian Production Car Championship. The separation additionally meant that drivers on the second group of classes were no longer eligible for the Australian Championship.

== Classes ==
Cars competed in five classes:

- Class A: High Performance Cars
- Class B: Sports Touring Cars
- Class C: V8 Touring Cars
- Class D: 6 Cylinder Touring Cars
- Class E: 4 Cylinder Touring Cars

== Calendar ==
The Outright, Class A & Class B titles were contested over an eight-round "GT Performance" series.

Round	Circuit	State	Date
1	Adelaide Parklands Circuit	SA	7–8 April
2	Wakefield Park	NSW	6 May
3	Canberra Street Circuit	ACT	9–10 June
4	Queensland Raceway	Qld	22 July
5	Eastern Creek International Raceway	NSW	19 August
6	Sandown International Motor Raceway	Vic	16 September
7	Gold Coast	Qld	26–28 October
8	Oran Park	NSW	25 November

The Class C, Class D & Class E titles were contested over an eight-round "GT Production" series.

Round	Circuit	State	Date
1	Wakefield Park	NSW	6 May
2	Phillip Island Grand Prix Circuit	Vic	27 May
3	Lakeside International Raceway	Qld	8 July
4	Queensland Raceway	Qld	22 July
5	Eastern Creek International Raceway	NSW	19 August
6	Winton Motor Raceway	Vic	9 September
7	Sandown International Motor Raceway	Vic	16 September
8	Oran Park	NSW	25 November

== Results ==
=== Outright Drivers Championship ===
Position	Driver	No.	Car	Entrant	R1	R2	R3	R4	R5	R6	R7	R8	Total
1	Brett Peters	26	Subaru Impreza WRX STi	Brett Peters	13	27	30	17	25	-	7	24	143
2	Wayne Boatwright	60	Subaru Impreza WRX STi	Wayne Boatwright	-	-	24	15.5	16	12	18	30	115.5
3	Phillip Polities	47	HSV VX GTS	Crystal IT / Diamond Age Int.	24	14	-	-	2	24	27	3	94
4	Graham Alexander	57	Mitsubishi Lancer Evo V	Graham Alexander	6	4	18	3.5	14	20	5	18	88.5
5	John Bowe	9	Ford Mustang Cobra RA	Budweiser	-	16	-	22	30	-	16	-	84
6	Mark King	1	Mitsubishi Lancer Evo V	Mark King	25	3	1	10	-	-	16	14	69
7	Ed Aitken	8	HSV VX GTS	Ed Aitken	9	6	6	10	3	30	-	-	64
8	Garry Deane	91	Subaru Impreza WRX STi	Jim McKnoulty	7	20	11	-	-	16	-	2	56
9	Peter Floyd	300	HSV VX GTS	Floyd Motorsport	1	8	18	-	5	-	20	2	54
10	Bob Hughes	15	Mitsubishi Lancer Evo V, Mitsubishi Lancer Evo VI	Bob Hughes	24	1	2	6	-	-	-	-	33
11	Phil Kirkham	71	Mazda RX-7	Maz Motor Wreckers	10	8	-	8	-	-	-	-	26
11	Bob Pearson	39	Mazda RX-7	Pro-Duct Motorsport Pty Ltd	1	8	-	1	10	-	-	6	26
13	Michael Brock	88	Mitsubishi Lancer Evo V	Brock Partners Real Estate	2	12	-	3	2	6	-	-	25
14	Steve Knight	23	Mitsubishi Lancer Evo VI	Steve Knight Racing	5	5	6	-	1	-	-	-	17
15	Peter Roma	30	Mazda RX-7	Peter Roma Motorsport	-	-	-	-	13	-	3	-	16
16	Barry Morcom	11	HSV VX GTS	Barry Morcom	-	-	9	0.5	-	-	4	-	13.5
17	David Wood	16	Honda S2000	Robert Lane / Kleenduct	-	1	-	-	-	2	9	-	12
18	Scott Anderson	59	Subaru Impreza WRX STi	Altiris Software	-	-	-	-	-	-	-	10	10
19	Shane Jenner	31	Nissan 200SX Spec R	Komatsu Racing	-	-	-	-	8	-	-	-	8
19	Dennis Gilbert	38	Mitsubishi Lancer Evo V	Gilbert Racing	-	-	-	-	3	4	-	1	8
19	Anton Mechtler	90	Mitsubishi Lancer Evo V	Mek-Tek Motorsports	-	-	-	-	1	-	2	5	8
22	Scott Jacob	50 & 51	Subaru Impreza WRX STi	Falken Tyres	-	-	-	3.5	-	-	4	-	7.5
23	Craig Dontas	85	HSV VTII GTS	Craig Dontas	6	-	1	-	-	-	-	-	7
23	Brian Carr	888	Ford Mustang Cobra RA	Budweiser	-	-	-	-	-	-	-	7	7
25	Craig Baird	9	Ford Mustang Cobra RA	Budweiser	-	-	5	-	-	-	-	-	5
25	Don Pulver	96	Nissan 200SX Spec R	Advanced Power	-	-	-	-	-	-	-	5	5
27	Trevor Sheumack	43	Subaru Impreza WRX STi	Where Is Navigation	-	-	2	-	-	-	-	-	2
27	Grant Kenny	50	Subaru Impreza WRX STi	Falken Tyres	-	-	-	-	-	-	2	-	2

Note: Only half points were awarded for Race 2 of Round 4 at Queensland Raceway as the race was red flagged.

=== Drivers Class Championships ===
Position	Driver	No.	Car	Entrant	Total
	Class A : High Performance Cars				
1	Brett Peters	26	Subaru Impreza WRX STi	Brett Peters	143
2	Wayne Boatwright	60	Subaru Impreza WRX STi	Wayne Boatwright	115.5
3	Phillip Polities	47	HSV VX GTS	Crystal IT / Diamond Age Int.	94
4	Graham Alexander	57	Mitsubishi Lancer Evo V	Graham Alexander	88.5
5	John Bowe	9	Ford Mustang Cobra RA	Budweiser	84
6	Mark King	1	Mitsubishi Lancer Evo V	Mark King	77
7	Ed Aitken	8	HSV VX GTS	Ed Aitken	64
8	Garry Deane	91	Subaru Impreza WRX STi	Jim McKnoulty	56
9	Peter Floyd	300	HSV VX GTS	Floyd Motorsport	54
10	Bob Hughes	15	Mitsubishi Lancer Evo V, Mitsubishi Lancer Evo VI	Bob Hughes	43
11	Phil Kirkham	71	Mazda RX-7	Maz Motor Wreckers	26
	Bob Pearson	39	Mazda RX-7	Pro-Duct Motorsport Pty Ltd	25
13	Michael Brock	88	Mitsubishi Lancer Evo V	Brock Partners Real Estate	25
14	Steve Knight	23	Mitsubishi Lancer Evo VI	Steve Knight Racing	17
15	Peter Roma	30	Mazda RX-7	Peter Roma Motorsport	16
16	Barry Morcom	11	HSV VX GTS	Barry Morcom	10
17	David Wood	16	Honda S2000	Robert Lane / Kleenduct	13.5
18	Scott Anderson	59	Subaru Impreza WRX STi	Altiris Software	12
19	Shane Jenner	31	Nissan 200SX Spec R	Komatsu Racing	8
	Dennis Gilbert	38	Mitsubishi Lancer Evo V	Gilbert Racing	8
	Anton Mechtler	90	Mitsubishi Lancer Evo V	Mek-Tek Motorsports	8
22	Scott Jacob	50 & 51	Subaru Impreza WRX STi	Falken Tyres	7.5
23	Craig Dontas	85	HSV VTII GTS	Craig Dontas	7
	Brian Carr	888	Ford Mustang Cobra RA	Budweiser	7
25	Craig Baird	9	Ford Mustang Cobra RA	Budweiser	5
	Don Pulver	96	Nissan 200SX Spec R	Advanced Power	5
27	Trevor Sheumack	43	Subaru Impreza WRX STi	Where Is Navigation	2
	Grant Kenny	50	Subaru Impreza WRX STi	Falken Tyres	2
	Class B : Sports Touring Cars				
1	Nathan Pilkington	77	Mitsubishi FTO	Nathan Pilkington	172
2	Nathan Thomas	37	Honda Integra Type-R	Nathan Thomas	131
3	Tim Leahey	35	Volkswagen Beetle RSi	Volkswagen	118.5
4	Anthony Robson	49	Toyota MR2, Toyota Celica	Osborne Motorsport	117
5	David Ratcliff	6	Toyota Celica	Nepean EFI	102
6	Colin Osborne	13	Toyota Celica	Osborne Motorsport	59
7	Wayne Russell	27	BMW 323i	Wayne Russell	47
8	Allan Shephard	44	Honda Integra Type-R	Tyrepoint	43
9	Sue Hughes	32	BMW 323i	Sue Hughes	37.5
10	Peter Boylan	7	BMW 325i	Peter Boylan	32
11	Matt Coleman	53	Volkswagen Beetle RSi	Volkswagen	31
12	Stuart McColl	53	Volkswagen Beetle RSi	Volkswagen	25
13	Len Cave	27; 66	BMW 323i Honda Integra Type-R	Wayne Russell; Just Cuts	24
14	Marcus La Delle	44	Honda Integra Type-R	Thrifty Car Rentals	16
15	Peter McKay	55	Volkswagen Beetle RSi	Volkswagen	10
16	John Cowley	2	Honda Integra Type-R	John Cowley	8
17	Paul Gover	55	Volkswagen Beetle RSi	Volkswagen	6
18	Klark Quinn	27	BMW 323i	Go Karts Go Australia	5
19	Greg McPherson	40	Honda Integra Type-R	Coads Pty Ltd	1
	Class C : V8 Touring Cars				
1	Scott Loadsman	62	Holden VT Commodore SS; Holden VX Commodore SS	Scott Loadsman	186
2	John McIlroy	95	Ford AUII Falcon XR8	Southern Rural Ford Dealer	171
3	Brian Carr	64	Ford AUII Falcon XR8	Brian Carr	170
4	Richard Winston	24	Holden VT Commodore SS	Richard Winston	106
5	Kent Youlden	69	Ford AUII Falcon XR8	Coffey Ford	31
6	James Phillip	69	Ford AUII Falcon XR8	James Phillip	20
	Class D : 6 Cylinder Touring Cars				
1	Daryl Coon	70	Ford AU Falcon XR6	Peter Warren Ford	197
2	Alan Holgersson	79	Toyota Camry CSi	Bill Buckle Toyota	190
3	Robert Chadwick	20	Mitsubishi TJ Magna Sports	Mitsubishi Electric	183
	Class E : 4 Cylinder Touring Cars				
1	Luke Youlden	76	Holden Astra SRi	Luke Youlden	151
2	David Russell	68	Proton Satria GTi	Proton / Mycar	147
3	Martin Doxey	17	Holden Vectra GL	Bilstein Shock Absorbers	127
4	Ben Driscoll	97	Holden Vectra GL	Bendix Mintex	125
5	Rick Bates	22	Daihatsu Sirion GTVi	Rick Bates	90
6	Megan Kirkham	54	Mazda MX-5	Phil Kirkham	61
7	Nigel Williams	67	Proton Satria GTi	Proton / Mycar	60
8	Carol Jackson	10	Honda Civic VTi-R	Carol Jackson	34
9	Kosi Kalaitzidis	21	Proton Satria GTi	Kosi Kalaitzidis	30
10	Jim McKinnon	75	Holden Astra SRi		22
11	Rod Wilson	21	Proton Satria GTi	Kosi Kalaitzidis	20
12	Kimon Papagoarge	21	Proton Satria GTi	Kosi Kalaitzidis	14

=== Manufacturers Award ===
Position	Manufacturer	Points
1	Holden	950.5
2	Ford	685.0
3	Mitsubishi	621.5
4	Toyota	468.0
5	Subaru	342.0
6	Proton	271.0
7	Honda	261.0
8	Volkswagen	189.5
9	BMW	129.5
10	Mazda	129.0
11	Daihatsu	90.0
12	Nissan	13.0

Note: Points awarded to Holden included points scored by HSV vehicles.
