= BibleProject =

Nonprofit making free educational content about the Bible

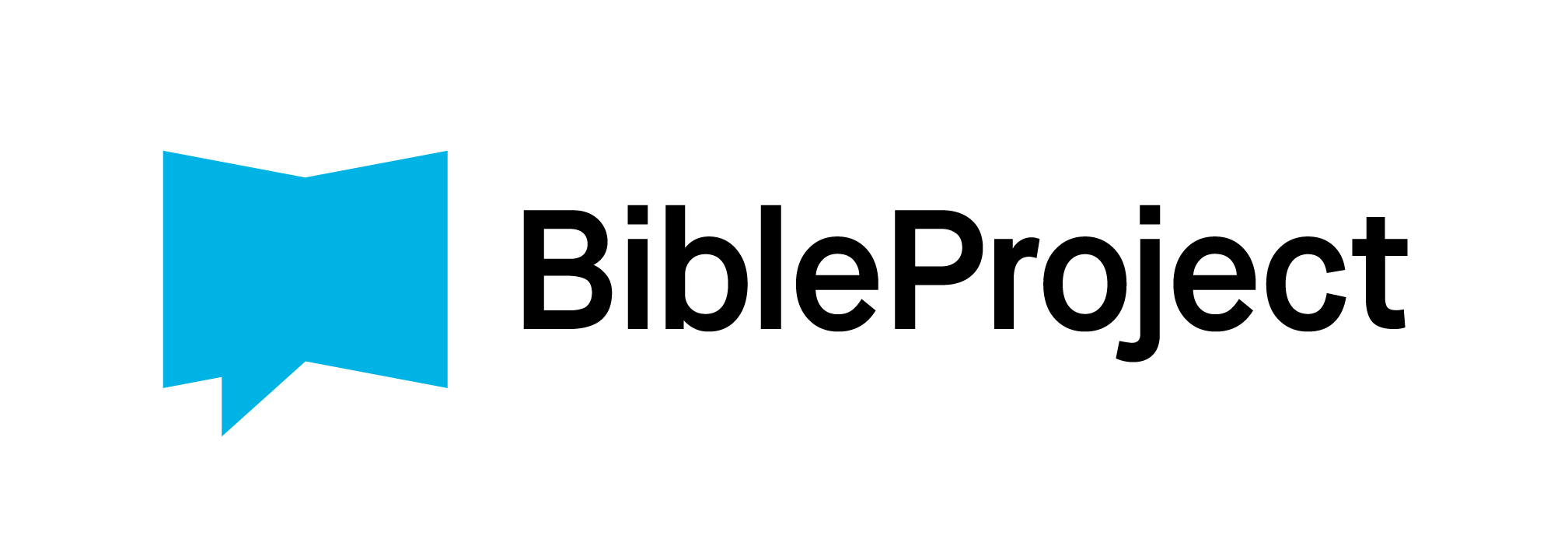
- Website type: 501(c)(3) / NTEE
- Available in: Multiple languages
- Website: bibleproject.com
- Launched: 2014; 12 years ago

BibleProject (previously known as The Bible Project) is a non-profit, crowdfunded organization based in Portland, Oregon, focused on creating free educational resources to help people understand the Bible. The organization was founded in 2014 by Dr. Tim Mackie and Jon Collins.

BibleProject produces animated videos that explore the literary structure, themes, and history of individual books of the Bible, as well as videos that explore key biblical concepts and themes. These videos are available on their website, YouTube, and various social media platforms. The organization also produces podcasts, study guides, online classes, a mobile app, and other resources. Resources are available for free to users of the website and application.

== History ==
BibleProject was started by friends Timothy Mackie and Jonathan Collins in 2014. They wanted to create free online teaching videos combining Mackie's academic background with Collins' professional experience writing explainer videos for technology companies. The organization's model is to be crowdfunded.

By 2019, BibleProject had created over 180 videos and 200 podcast episodes. Revenue increased from less than US$900,000 in 2015 to over US$9 million in 2019.

As of 2022, BibleProject videos have been viewed across various social media platforms over 100 million times. That year, the organization launched a mobile app.

By the start of 2026, BibleProject had created over 250 videos and 550 podcasts, gathering over 620 million views from across 200 countries. Revenue reached US$23 million in 2023.
