= Aston Martin DBRS9 =

British racing car

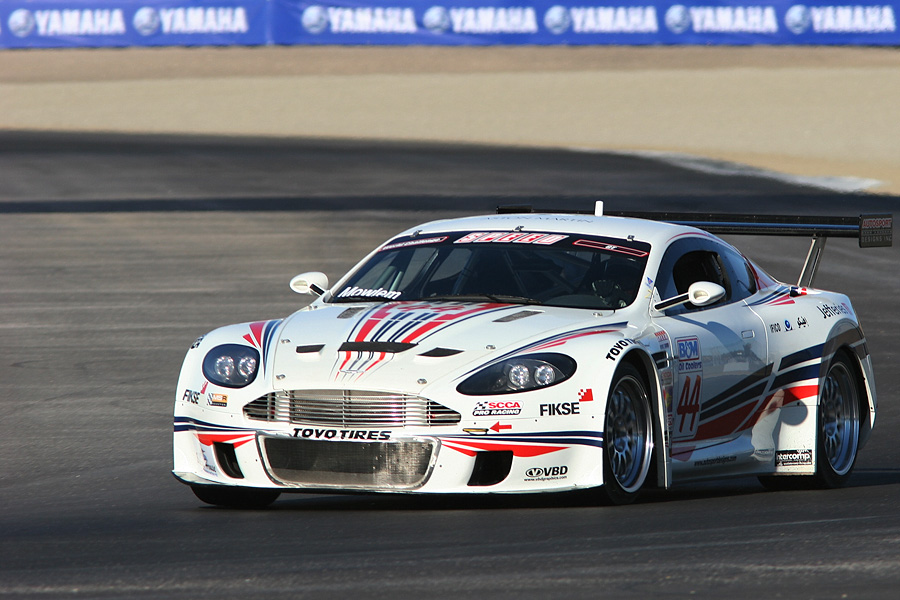
- An Aston Martin DBRS9 at the 2006 Speed World Challenge GT series
- Category: FIA GT3
- Constructor: Aston Martin (Prodrive)
- Designers: George Howard-Chappell (Technical Director, Aston Martin Racing); Graham Humphrys (Chief Engineer for Motorsport, Aston Martin)

Technical specifications
- Chassis: Bonded aluminium chassis, with Carbon fibre panels
- Suspension (front): Double wishbone with adjustable Koni dampers
- Suspension (rear): Double wishbone with adjustable Koni dampers
- Length: 4,687 mm (184.5 in)
- Width: 1,979 mm (77.9 in)
- Height: 1,195 mm (47.0 in)
- Axle track: 1,635 mm (64.4 in)
- Wheelbase: 2,741 mm (107.9 in)
- Engine: Aston Martin 5,935 cc (5.9 L; 362.2 cu in), all aluminium, DOHC, 48 valve, 89 x 79.5 mm (bore x stroke), V12, naturally aspirated, 550 bhp (410 kW; 558 PS), 620 N⋅m (457 lb⋅ft), FMR
- Transmission: Xtrac 6-speed sequential manual/manual
- Weight: 1,230 kg (2,712 lb)

Competition history

The Aston Martin DBRS9 was a racing car built by Aston Martin Racing to be a cheaper alternative to the Aston Martin DBR9, both of which are based on the Aston Martin DB9. The DBRS9 was introduced in 2005 and has since been replaced with the Aston Martin V12 Vantage GT3.

== Development ==
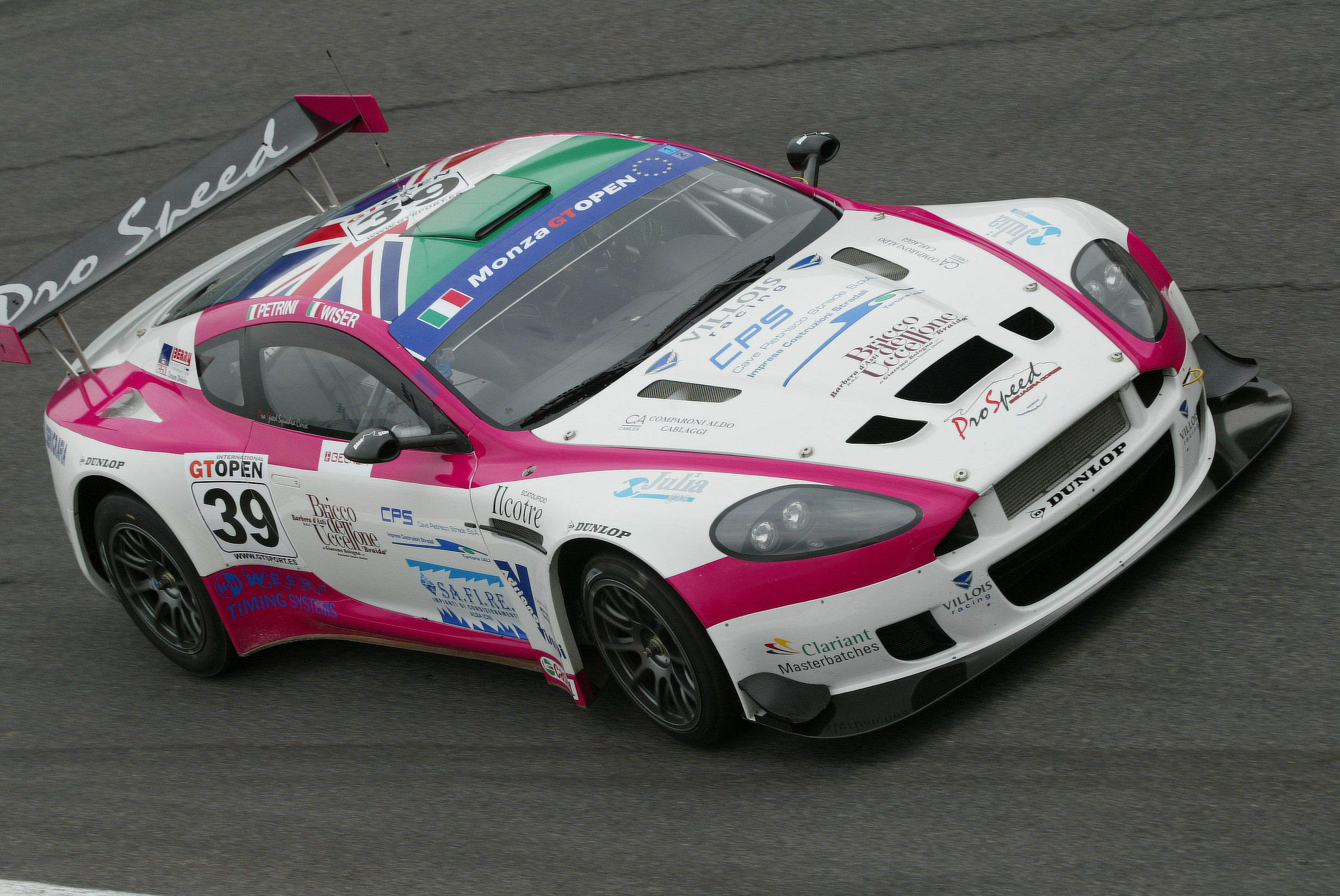
An Aston Martin DBRS9

The DBRS9 features several modifications to the standard DB9. With developments including a full race specification roll-cage and a tuned version of the 5.9-litre V12 engine to bring output up to 550 bhp (410 kW; 558 PS) and 620 N⋅m (457 lb⋅ft). Other modifications include carbon fiber body panels (excluding roof), polycarbonate side and rear windows and a stripped out interior in order to drop weight by 480 kg (1,060 lb). These enhancements bring the DBRS9's power output up to 430 bhp/tonne. The DBRS9 has a 0 to 60 mph (97 km/h) time of 3.4 seconds and a top speed of 314 km/h (195 mph).

The car also features uprated suspension with a lowered ride height and stiffened racing springs. The DBRS9 has also been fitted with a close-ratio racing gearbox in either 6-speed fully manual or an upgraded sequential manual form.

The DBRS9 is open to customers through Aston Martin Racing and Prodrive at a price of approximately £175,000 without optional extras and taxes. The car is a bridge between the highly expensive, fully race specification GT1 Aston Martin DBR9 and the standard DB9 road car.
