= 2012 Supercheap Auto Bathurst 1000 =

Motor race in Australia

Seasons
- ← 2011 2013 →

(New South Wales) 2012 Supercheap Auto Bathurst 1000
Event Information
- Round 11 of 15 in the 2012 International V8 Supercars Championship
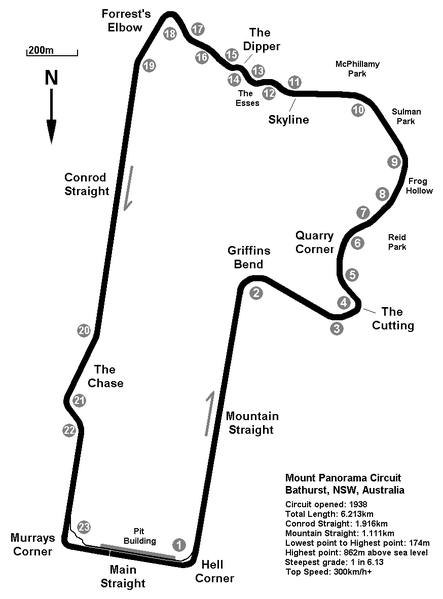
- Date: 4–7 October 2012
- Location: Bathurst, New South Wales
- Venue: Mount Panorama Circuit
- Weather: Fine

Results
Race 1
Distance	161 laps	1000 km
Pole position	Will Davison; Ford Performance Racing	2:08.0693
Winner	Jamie Whincup; Paul Dumbrell; Triple Eight Race Engineering	6:16:01.3304

The 2012 Supercheap Auto Bathurst 1000 was an Australian touring car motor race for V8 Supercars, the twenty-first race of the 2012 International V8 Supercars Championship. It was held on Sunday, 7 October 2012 at the Mount Panorama Circuit on the outskirts of Bathurst, New South Wales, in Australia.

The Ford Performance Racing duo of Will Davison and John McIntyre started the race from pole position. Jamie Whincup and Paul Dumbrell won the race, ahead of David Reynolds and Dean Canto in second place, and Craig Lowndes and Warren Luff completing the podium. Whincup and Dumbrell's race time of six hours, sixteen minutes and one-point-three seconds was the second-fastest race time in the history of the event.

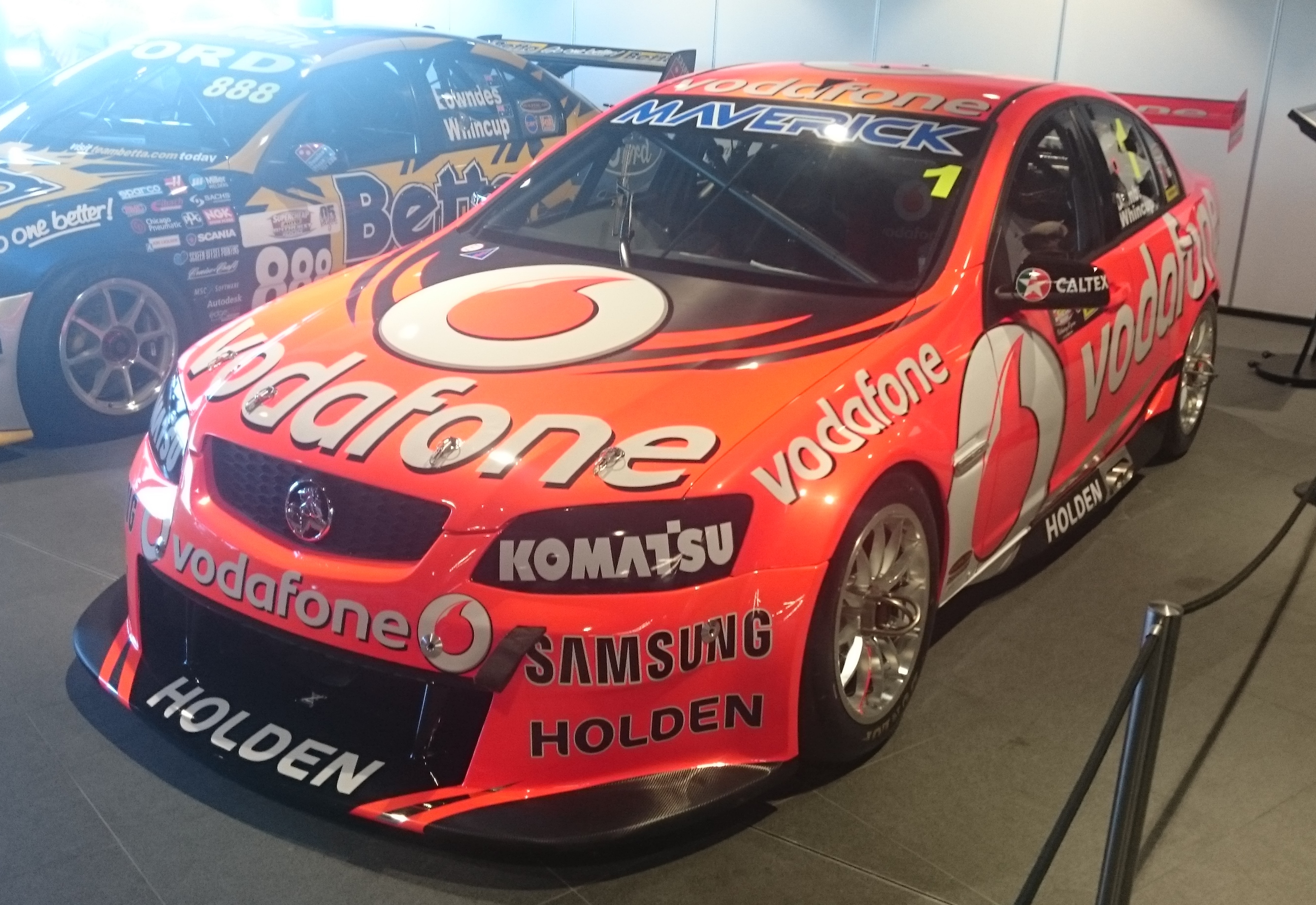
Jamie Whincup and Paul Dumbrell won the race driving a Holden Commodore VE. The car is pictured in 2018.

== Background ==
The 2012 race was the sixteenth running of the Australian 1000 race, which was first held after the organisational split between the Australian Racing Drivers Club and V8 Supercars Australia that saw the Bathurst race run twice in 1997 and 1998, with one race open to V8 Supercar entries, and the other open to Super Touring cars. The schism was repaired in time for the 1999 race, with the race being open exclusively to V8 Supercars.

The 2012 race was also the 55th race for which the lineage can be traced back to the 1960 Armstrong 500 – held at Phillip Island – and the 52nd to be held at Mount Panorama; the two separate races of 1997 and 1998 are recognised as four individual runnings of the event. Race organisers planned to use this race to celebrate the 50th year since the race first moved from Phillip Island to Mount Panorama in 1963, though it was not until 1973 that the race was run over 1,000 kilometres (620 mi); from 1963 to 1972, the race was run over 500 miles (800 km).

The Holden Racing Team drivers Garth Tander and Nick Percat were the defending race winners.

== Entries ==
All twenty-eight cars which contest the regular V8 Supercar season took part in the race, plus one "wildcard" entry—a car that is only entered in the endurance races—prepared by Minda Motorsport and operated by Kelly Racing. Each car was driven by its regular driver, who contests the full International V8 Supercar Championship, and a guest driver, who only took part in the Bathurst race and its prologue, the Sandown 500. These guest drivers were recruited from a variety of racing categories, including the Dunlop Development Series (such as Nick Percat, partnering Garth Tander), the V8 Ute Racing Series (such as Chris Pither, partnering David Wall), and the New Zealand-based V8 SuperTourer Series (such as John McIntyre, partnering Will Davison), among others. Each driver was required to complete at least 54 laps of the race, with the teams given the freedom to allocate those laps as they see fit.

The only exception to this applied specifically to the Kelly Racing—Minda Motorsport "wildcard" entry. This car was driven by Cam Waters and Jesse Dixon, both of whom won the opportunity to drive as part of the Shannons Supercar Showdown, a reality television programme created by Kelly Racing. Waters, who won the 2011 competition, was a late entry to the grid; the car was originally scheduled to be driven by Dixon, the 2012 winner, and Australian television personality Grant Denyer. However, Denyer was forced to withdraw two weeks before the race due to injury, and Waters was drafted in to replace him. Together, Waters (18) and Dixon (19) formed the youngest driver line-up to enter the race in its fifty-year history.

=== Entry list ===
No.	Drivers	Team (Sponsor)	Car	No.	Drivers	Team (Sponsor)	Car
1	(Australia) Jamie Whincup (Australia) Paul Dumbrell	Triple Eight Race Engineering (Vodafone)	Holden Commodore VE	19	(Australia) Jonathon Webb (New Zealand) Scott McLaughlin	Tekno Autosports (Sargent Security)	Holden Commodore VE
2	(Australia) Garth Tander (Australia) Nick Percat	Holden Racing Team (Holden, Toll)	Holden Commodore VE	21	(Australia) David Wall (New Zealand) Chris Pither	Britek Motorsport (Wilson Security, McGrath Foundation)	Holden Commodore VE
3	(Australia) Tony D'Alberto (Australia) Dale Wood	Tony D'Alberto Racing (Hiflex Hydraulic Hoses)	Ford Falcon FG	22	(Australia) James Courtney (Australia) Cameron McConville	Holden Racing Team (Holden, Toll)	Holden Commodore VE
4	(Australia) Lee Holdsworth (Australia) Craig Baird	Stone Brothers Racing (Irwin Tools)	Ford Falcon FG	23	(Australia) Cam Waters (Australia) Jesse Dixon	Kelly Racing / Minda Motorsport (Shannons, carsales.com)	Holden Commodore VE
5	(Australia) Mark Winterbottom (New Zealand) Steven Richards	Ford Performance Racing (Orrcon Steel)	Ford Falcon FG	30	(Australia) Taz Douglas (Australia) Scott Pye	Lucas Dumbrell Motorsport (iSelect)	Holden Commodore VE
6	(Australia) Will Davison (New Zealand) John McIntyre	Ford Performance Racing (Trading Post)	Ford Falcon FG	33	(France) Alexandre Prémat (Australia) Jack Perkins	Garry Rogers Motorsport (Fujitsu)	Holden Commodore VE
7	(Australia) Todd Kelly (Australia) Tim Blanchard	Kelly Racing (Jack Daniel's)	Holden Commodore VE	34	(Australia) Michael Caruso (Australia) Greg Ritter	Garry Rogers Motorsport (Fujitsu)	Holden Commodore VE
8	(Australia) Jason Bright (Australia) Andrew Jones	Brad Jones Racing (BOC Gas and Gear)	Holden Commodore VE	47	(Australia) Tim Slade (Australia) Andrew Thompson	James Rosenberg Racing (Lucky 7 Convenience Stores)	Ford Falcon FG
9	(New Zealand) Shane van Gisbergen (Australia) Luke Youlden	Stone Brothers Racing (SP Tools)	Ford Falcon FG	49	(Australia) Steve Owen (Australia) Paul Morris	Paul Morris Motorsport (VIP Petfoods)	Ford Falcon FG
11	(Australia) Karl Reindler (New Zealand) Daniel Gaunt	Kelly Racing (Fair Dinkum Sheds)	Holden Commodore VE	51	(New Zealand) Greg Murphy (Australia) Owen Kelly	Kelly Racing (Pepsi Max Kick)	Holden Commodore VE
12	(Australia) Dean Fiore (New Zealand) Matt Halliday	Triple F Racing (Jim Beam)	Ford Falcon FG	52	(Australia) David Reynolds (Australia) Dean Canto	Rod Nash Racing (The Bottle-O)	Ford Falcon FG
14	(New Zealand) Fabian Coulthard (Australia) David Besnard	Brad Jones Racing (Lockwood)	Holden Commodore VE	66	(Australia) Russell Ingall (Austria) Christian Klien	Walkinshaw Racing (Supercheap Auto Club Plus)	Holden Commodore VE
15	(Australia) Rick Kelly (Australia) David Russell	Kelly Racing (Jack Daniel's)	Holden Commodore VE	91	(Australia) Michael Patrizi (New Zealand) Jonny Reid	Tekno Autosports (Hawkins Transport)	Holden Commodore VE
17	(Australia) James Moffat (Australia) Alex Davison	Dick Johnson Racing (Norton AntiVirus)	Ford Falcon FG	888	(Australia) Craig Lowndes (Australia) Warren Luff	Triple Eight Race Engineering (Vodafone)	Holden Commodore VE
18	(Australia) Steven Johnson (Denmark) Allan Simonsen	Dick Johnson Racing (Jim Beam)	Ford Falcon FG				

- Entries with a grey background were Wildcard Entries which do not compete in the full championship season.

== Report ==
=== Free practice ===
The first free practice session took place on the Thursday morning before the race, taking the form of a fifty-minute timed session open to all drivers, though most teams elected to run only their primary drivers. The session passed without incident, and Michael Caruso – driving for Garry Rogers Motorsport – finished the session fastest, one-tenth of a second ahead of championship leader Jamie Whincup and the Ford Falcon of Shane van Gisbergen. Cam Waters, driving the Kelly Racing / Minda Motorsport wildcard entry, finished in twenty-ninth and last place, five and a half seconds behind Caruso, and two and a half seconds behind the sister Kelly Racing car of Karl Reindler and Daniel Gaunt in twenty-eighth place.

The second forty-five-minute free practice session early on Thursday afternoon was limited to co-drivers. Britek Motorsport's Chris Pither became the first driver to crash when he locked up one of his front wheels at the end of Mountain Straight, understeering into the tyre wall on the outside of Griffins' Bend. Although the damage was minor, the session was suspended for thirteen minutes to allow the circuit to be cleared, and the car was retired to the garage for the remainder of the session. Warren Luff – partner to Craig Lowndes in the #888 Triple Eight Race Engineering Commodore – finished fastest, ahead of Andrew Jones and Steven Richards. In his first appearance in a V8 Supercar, Jesse Dixon finished twenty-ninth, the Kelly Racing / Minda Motorsport setting a fastest lap that was five seconds slower than Luff's time. Stone Brothers Racing driver Lee Holdsworth also took part in the session, despite being a primary driver rather than a co-driver, testing Ford's "Car of the Future" prototype to gather data on tyre performance for tyre supplier Dunlop. Holdsworth also drove the car in two of the Dunlop V8 Supercar Series support race practice sessions.

The first day of running ended with a fifty-minute session late on Thursday afternoon. Like the first session, it ran without incident, though drivers were cautioned when kangaroos were spotted on Conrod Straight. Jamie Whincup ended the session on top, half a second faster than Will Davison. Whincup's final flying lap was nearly a second faster than Davison, who subsequently narrowed the margin with his own final lap. After Pither's accident sidelined the Britek Motorsports car for most of the second session, the car was repaired and its regular driver, David Wall was able to complete the session, finishing twenty-third overall.

Practice resumed on Friday morning, with a second session open only to co-drivers. The session was incident-free, and at the end of fifty minutes, Scott McLaughlin – partnering Tekno Autosports' Jonathon Webb – was fastest, a tenth of a second quicker than Jamie Whincup's partner, Paul Dumbrell. Once again, Jesse Dixon finished the session last in the Kelly Racing / Minda Motorsport wildcard entry, but improved his best time from the second practice session by two seconds, but was shown the bad sportsmanship flag for abusing the limits of the circuit while going through The Esses.

The Triple Eight Race Engineering pair of Jamie Whincup and Craig Lowndes topped the final free practice session before qualifying, with Whincup half a second faster than his teammate. The session was suspended twice due to incidents; the first came when Tony D'Alberto made contact with the wall at McPhillamy Park, damaging his front tyre and elected to stop on the circuit rather than risk further damage to the car ahead of qualifying. The second interruption came shortly after D'Alberto's car was cleared from the circuit when Tim Slade got caught in the gravel trap on the outside of Murray's Corner.

Mark Winterbottom set the fastest time in the final practice session, held on Saturday morning. Garth Tander was second-fastest, three tenths of a second behind Winterbottom, while Winterbottom's teammate, Will Davison was third-fastest. Dick Johnson Racing's James Moffat finished the session in twenty-ninth, some thirty-six seconds off Winterbottom's time after his car broke a tailshaft that ripped an oil line free from underneath the car, causing enough damage to sideline the #17 entry for the remainder of the session.

Summary

Session	Time	No.	Driver	Team	Car	Fastest lap	Weather
Thursday
Practice 1	10:40	34	(Australia) Michael Caruso	Garry Rogers Motorsport	Holden VE Commodore	2:08.4081	Dry, sunny
Practice 2	12:25	888	(Australia) Warren Luff	Triple Eight Race Engineering	Holden VE Commodore	2:09.1794	Dry, sunny
Practice 3	15:05	1	(Australia) Jamie Whincup	Triple Eight Race Engineering	Holden VE Commodore	2:07.3565	Dry, sunny
Friday
Practice 4	09:25	19	(New Zealand) Scott McLaughlin	Tekno Autosports	Holden VE Commodore	2:08.9697	Dry, sunny
Practice 5	11:00	1	(Australia) Jamie Whincup	Triple Eight Race Engineering	Holden VE Commodore	2:07.5000	Dry, sunny
Saturday
Practice 6	10:25	5	(Australia) Mark Winterbottom	Ford Performance Racing	Ford FG Falcon	2:07.7370	Dry, overcast

=== Qualifying ===
The forty-minute qualifying session was held on Friday afternoon. It decided positions eleven through to twenty-nine on the grid, with the top ten drivers advancing to the Top 10 Shootout, to be held on the Saturday afternoon. During the Friday session, drivers were free to complete as much running as necessary to set a competitive lap time, but with the knowledge that their tyre allocation for the weekend was limited and that they would have to qualify on tyres that they would later use the race, the drivers had to balance their desire to set a fast time against the need to preserve as many tyres as possible for Sunday's race.

The session was red-flagged and suspended almost as soon as the circuit was open, when Holden Racing Team driver Garth Tander locked one of his tyres up at the end of Mountain Straight and understeered into the barrier on the outside of Griffins' Bend, in an incident similar to the one Chris Pither experienced in free practice. Tander was able to extricate himself from wall with largely cosmetic damage, and he limped back around the circuit to the pits while safety crews cleared away the fluids spilled by his Commodore in the accident. Tander's team were able to patch up the damage with sheets of tape, and while he was later heard on the radio complaining of his inability to stop the car and seen spinning at Hell Corner, he would ultimately set a lap time that would prove fast enough for a place in the Top 10 Shootout.

Michael Caruso set the early pace in the session, but he was unable to maintain it for long and was soon supplanted by the Ford Performance Racing cars driven by Mark Winterbottom and Will Davison. The lead would change several times throughout the session, but it was not until Jamie Whincup set his first competitive lap time that the leader board began to stabilise, and from that point on, it became a fight between Whincup and the Fords that Craig Lowndes briefly entered into, but soon turned his attention to securing a place in the Top 10 Shootout.

Elsewhere, several other drivers encountered troubles; James Moffat very nearly spun coming out of the Skyline, and was forced to apply opposite lock to his steering wheel to avoid the walls. He was later seen spearing off the road at the Chase, having misjudged his braking point and running through the grass on the outside of the left-hander. Jason Bright had a similar off-track excursion, but like Moffat, he was able to avoid the walls.

As the session began to wind down to a close, drivers started producing lap times that were increasingly competitive. Jonathon Webb, Bright, Rick Kelly and James Courtney had all looked to secure places in the Top 10 Shootout, but were all pushed out in the dying minutes. After forty minutes, Whincup had set the fastest time, ahead of Fabian Coulthard, who had produced a late flying lap to secure second. Mark Winterbottom edged out teammate Davison for third place, ahead of Craig Lowndes, Shane van Gisbergen, and Tim Slade. Despite his early accident, Tander recovered to eighth, having run as high as third before the final push for lap times. Steve Owen and David Reynolds both qualified in the top ten, though Reynolds was forced to wait anxiously as several other drivers – including Lee Holdsworth and Webb – still had enough time to record one final flying lap, though neither were able to surpass his time.

Webb ultimately missed the cut-off by seven hundredths of a second, leaving him eleventh alongside Bright, with Kelly and Courtney filling out the seventh row of the grid behind them. Holdsworth's final lap left him fifteenth, alongside early pace-setter Caruso. Teammates Moffat and Steven Johnson took sixteenth and seventeenth, alongside Todd Kelly in the second Jack Daniels' Racing car, in what would be his final appearance in a Holden, having injured his shoulder in a training accident that would force him to miss the final four races of the 2012 season, while his team would switch to fielding Nissan Altimas in 2013.

Michael Patrizi qualified twentieth alongside Kelly, while Dean Fiore and David Wall out-qualified 2011 pole-sitter Greg Murphy in his second race back from a recurring back injury. Tony D'Alberto qualified twenty-fourth in the slowest of the Ford Falcons, ahead of Russell Ingall in twenty-fifth and Jack Perkins in twenty-sixth, Perkins having qualified the Garry Rogers-prepared Fujitsu Commodore in the place of regular driver Alexandre Prémat. Taz Douglas and Karl Reindler completed the last full row of the grid, leaving Cam Waters and Jesse Dixon in twenty-ninth and last place, two-point-seven seconds adrift of Whincup's time.

=== Top 10 Shootout ===
The Top 10 Shootout took place at 16:30 local time on Saturday afternoon. Each of the ten fastest drivers in Friday qualifying were given one lap to set record a final qualifying time running in reverse order – so that the tenth-placed driver from Friday would go first, followed by the ninth-placed driver, all the way down to the fastest driver on Friday, who would be the last driver out – which would then decide the starting order to the top ten places on the grid.

David Reynolds was the first driver to take to the circuit. Conditions were considerably cooler and visibility lower than during the previous day's qualifying session, and Reynolds' lap time was half a second slower than his previous qualifying time. Steve Owen was the next driver out, setting a time that was over a second slower than Reynolds' and confirming that the conditions meant that lap times during the Shootout would not be as fast as the previous day's qualifying times had suggested. Several mistakes around the lap, particularly coming out of the Cutting, would also cost Owen dearly, and he would finish tenth overall.

Garth Tander was the first driver to better Reynolds' time, improving upon his time by four-tenths of a second. He was followed by Tim Slade, making his first appearance in the Bathurst Shootout. Slade, too, was fastest than Reynolds, but was unable to surpass Tander's time. Tander's place on provisional pole did not last long, as Shane van Gisbergen took to the circuit fifth and established a new benchmark of 2:08.1791, which would prove difficult to beat. A poor first sector from Craig Lowndes left the three-time Bathurst winner struggling to record a competitive time, and with Van Gisbergen having been the fastest through the final sector, Lowndes ultimately had to settle for ninth.

Will Davison was the next to record a lap time, and while he had the advantage over Van Gisbergen in the first sector, he lost time in the second across the top of the mountain. Davison made a mistake whilst exiting the Chase, but held on by a tenth of a second to take provisional pole away from Van Gisbergen. By his own admission, small errors throughout the lap meant that Davison's hold on provisional pole was tenuous with three more drivers to come. His teammate, Mark Winterbottom was next, and while they were evenly-matched through the first sector, Winterbottom lost time whilst traversing The Esses and was slower than Van Gisbergen.

Reports of rain on the initial climb up the mountain began to come in as Fabian Coulthard took to the circuit, and in-car shots clearly showed drizzle as he climbed Mountain Straight. Coulthard's lap was cautious, and while there was not enough water on the circuit to greatly affect his time, he would finish even further adrift of Davison in fifth place. The rain continued as the final runner, Jamie Whincup, started his flying lap, and the reigning champion was unfazed by the worsening weather as he passed through the first sector nine hundredths of a second faster than Will Davison. The second sector split, coming out of Forrest's Elbow, was even closer with Whincup in front by just two ten-thousandths of a second. But despite Davison's messy exit coming out of the Chase, Whincup lost time in the final sector, missing out on pole position by half a second. Thus, Davison claimed his first pole position at the Mount Panorama Circuit, with Whincup second. Van Gisbergen and Winterbottom filled out the second row of the grid, ahead of Coulthard and Tander, Slade and Reynolds, and the struggling Lowndes in ninth place alongside Owen.

=== Post-qualifying ===
Race stewards handed Tekno Autosports' Michael Patrizi and Jonny Reid a five-place grid penalty for blocking Jason Bright during the Friday qualifying session, which Bright claimed prevented him from securing a place in the Top 10 Shootout. Patrizi, who had qualified in twentieth place on merit, would start the race from twenty-fifth place instead.

==== Final starting grid ====
The following table represents the final starting grid for the race on Sunday:

Inside row			Outside row		
1	(Australia) Will Davison (New Zealand) John McIntyre	6	1	(Australia) Jamie Whincup (Australia) Paul Dumbrell	2
1	Ford Performance Racing (Ford Falcon FG)		Triple Eight Race Engineering (Holden Commodore VE)		2
3	(New Zealand) Shane van Gisbergen (Australia) Luke Youlden	9	5	(Australia) Mark Winterbottom (New Zealand) Steven Richards	4
3	Stone Brothers Racing (Ford Falcon FG)		Ford Performance Racing (Ford Falcon FG)		4
5	(New Zealand) Fabian Coulthard (Australia) David Besnard	14	2	(Australia) Garth Tander (Australia) Nick Percat	6
5	Brad Jones Racing (Holden Commodore VE)		Holden Racing Team (Holden Commodore VE)		6
7	(Australia) Tim Slade (Australia) Andrew Thompson	47	52	(Australia) David Reynolds (Australia) Dean Canto	8
7	James Rosenberg Racing (Ford Falcon FG)		Rod Nash Racing (Ford Falcon FG)		8
9	(Australia) Craig Lowndes (Australia) Warren Luff	888	49	(Australia) Steve Owen (Australia) Paul Morris	10
9	Triple Eight Race Engineering (Holden Commodore VE)		Paul Morris Motorsport (Ford Falcon FG)		10
11	(Australia) Jonathon Webb (New Zealand) Scott McLaughlin	19	8	(Australia) Jason Bright (Australia) Andrew Jones	12
11	Tekno Autosports (Holden Commodore VE)		Brad Jones Racing (Holden Commodore VE)		12
13	(Australia) Rick Kelly (Australia) David Russell	15	22	(Australia) James Courtney (Australia) Cameron McConville	14
13	Kelly Racing (Holden Commodore VE)		Holden Racing Team (Holden Commodore VE)		14
15	(Australia) Lee Holdsworth (New Zealand) Craig Baird	4	34	(Australia) Michael Caruso (Australia) Greg Ritter	16
15	Stone Brothers Racing (Ford Falcon FG)		Garry Rogers Motorsport (Holden Commodore VE)		16
17	(Australia) James Moffat (Australia) Alex Davison	17	18	(Australia) Steven Johnson (Denmark) Allan Simonsen	18
17	Dick Johnson Racing (Ford Falcon FG)		Dick Johnson Racing (Ford Falcon FG)		18
19	(Australia) Todd Kelly (Australia) Tim Blanchard	7	12	(Australia) Dean Fiore (New Zealand) Matthew Halliday	20
19	Kelly Racing (Holden Commodore VE)		Triple F Racing (Ford Falcon FG)		20
21	(Australia) David Wall (New Zealand) Chris Pither	21	51	(New Zealand) Greg Murphy (Australia) Owen Kelly	22
21	Britek Motorsport (Holden Commodore VE)		Kelly Racing (Holden Commodore VE)		22
23	(Australia) Tony D'Alberto (Australia) Dale Wood	3	66	(Australia) Russell Ingall (Austria) Christian Klien	24
23	Tony D'Alberto Racing (Ford Falcon FG)		Walkinshaw Racing (Holden Commodore VE)		24
25	(Australia) Michael Patrizi (New Zealand) Jonny Reid	91	33	(France) Alexandre Prémat (Australia) Jack Perkins	26
25	Tekno Autosports (Holden Commodore VE)		Garry Rogers Motorsport (Holden Commodore VE)		26
27	(Australia) Taz Douglas (Australia) Scott Pye	30	11	(Australia) Karl Reindler (New Zealand) Daniel Gaunt	28
27	Lucas Dumbrell Motorsport (Holden Commodore VE)		Kelly Racing (Holden Commodore VE)		28
29	(Australia) Cam Waters (Australia) Jesse Dixon	23			
29	Kelly Racing / Minda Motorsport (Holden Commodore VE)				

=== Race ===
Paul Dumbrell, starting from second on the grid, made the best start, but pole-sitter Will Davison was able to stay with him through Hell Corner and up Mountain Straight, seizing the lead by driving around the outside of Dumbrell through Griffins' Bend. Dumbrell was soon passed by Shane van Gisbergen, who immediately started applying pressure to Davison. Meanwhile, Mark Winterbottom made a poor start and slipped down the order, fighting with Tim Slade and David Reynolds over seventh place. Steve Owen also went backwards at the start, having overshot his grid position when the grid was formed, and being overwhelmed by the fast-starting cars around him as the field headed up Mountain Straight.

Tyre management quickly became a big issue, when Craig Lowndes was forced to pit after just eleven laps with a tyre failure. Winterbottom was also forced to make an early stop with a similar problem, and both plummeted back down the order. The effect was somewhat negated by the first safety car intervention when Jonny Reid, driving the #91 Tekno Autosports entry, ground to a halt on the narrow climb out of the Cutting. Davison, Dumbrell and Garth Tander all elected to pit immediately, while Van Gisbergen stayed out on the circuit to take the lead of the race. Davison changed places with co-driver John McIntyre and quickly rejoined, but Dumbrell's stop was compromised when his team was forced to change the driver's-side window, and by the time Jamie Whincup pulled out of the pits, he had lost a place to Nick Percat, the Holden Racing Team having capitalised on the slow stop to get the Tander—Percat Commodore out ahead of Whincup. Most of the field would pit under the safety car, and once racing resumed, McIntyre led from Lowndes and Luke Youlden and Dean Canto in Van Gisbergen's and Reynolds' cars respectively; Canto quickly reeled Youlden in and passed him as they emerged from Forrest's Elbow and the circuit opened up onto Conrod Srraight.

Whincup's lead did not last long, as he returned to the pits with a delaminated tyre and fell to twenty-first; McIntyre reported a similar problem and pitted, but the Ford Performance Racing pit crew could find nothing wrong with the tyre and he rejoined in twenty-second as Lowndes inherited the lead. Percat triggered a second safety car when he crashed coming down through The Esses on the approach to Forrest's Elbow, and although he was able to return to the pits under his own power, he had left a trail of debris on the racing line, necessitating the safety car. His Holden Racing Team crew would ultimately be able to repair the car and send it back out, but twenty laps off the lead. Meanwhile, the field pitted again, but Whincup and McIntyre remained out and resumed the race in first and second. By this point, only Whincup, Lowndes and Lucas Dumbrell Motorsport driver Taz Douglas were the only regular drivers out on the circuit, and Whincup took full advantage of a field of co-drivers to build up a thirteen-second lead.

Whincup's strategy began to work against him when the race saw the third safety car in the space of fifty laps. Having just stopped for a brake pad change, Steve Owen found himself at the end of Mountain Straight with no brake pressure and spun at speed into the barriers on the outside of Griffins' Bend. Owen was uninjured, but the car was critically damaged, and would not return to the race. The field bunched up again, and Whincup handed control of his car back to Dumbrell as the rest of the field swapped for their regular drivers. Craig Lowndes was held up in the pit lane waiting for Whincup to complete his stop and fell from fourth to twelfth as a result, while John McIntyre spun at Hell Corner and was forced to perform a three-point turn to escape the run-off, dropping from second to twentieth. More problems ensued when he made his scheduled stop and left the car in gear once it was raised onto its jacks; as the spinning wheels were dangerous for the pit crew, the team was handed a penalty by race stewards. Back on the circuit, Dumbrell took advantage of the slower, non-pitting cars of Craig Baird – driving for Lee Holdsworth – and Andrew Thompson, sharing with Slade, to hold off Reynolds, Jason Bright, Michael Caruso, James Courtney and Van Gisbergen.

The race began to settle down, with drivers aiming for targeted lap times and attempting to avoid kerbs as much as possible to preserve the life of their tyres; the kerb on the outside of Griffins' Bend and on the inside of the left-hander at the Chase were earmarked as the ones to avoid where and when possible. Dumbrell maintained a steady lead over Reynolds, while Caruso, Courtney and Mark Winterbottom rounded up and passed Bright. Greg Murphy and Tony D'Alberto had also fought their way up into the top ten, having started twentieth and twenty-third respectively, while Van Gisbergen was shuffled back down the order when one of his tyres failed after just eight laps.

A further safety car was needed on lap 91, when David Besnard spun the #14 Brad Jones Racing Commodore at Skyline. He narrowly avoided hitting the wall, but beached himself in the gravel trap and needed assistance to be extracted, triggering the safety car. This brought about another wave of pit stops, and with it, the first major strategy deviations. Triple Eight had been running their cars in twenty-three lap windows, the maximum they felt was viable on the tyres; by comparison, Rod Nash Racing was running longer stints, so that when the race resumed, Whincup and Dumbrell only had enough fuel to reach lap 108, whereas Reynolds and Canto could make it to lap 119 before needing another stop. The advantage of this came into effect with the fifth deployment of the safety car when Andrew Jones burst a tyre on the second Brad Jones Racing Commodore and went off at Murray's Corner. Needing less fuel than those around him, Reynolds was able to make a shorter stop and leapfrog from sixth to second place. Lowndes, on the other hand, suffered when he tried to perform the same feat, as he was once again forced to wait for his team to finish servicing Whincup before he could make his stop. Upon exiting his pit bay, Lowndes nearly made contact with David Wall and Alexandre Prémat, though he escaped without penalty for an unsafe release.

Brad Jones Racing's difficult day continued after the restart. Besnard had returned the #14 car to the pit, where the team changed the steering rack and manage to get the car back out onto the circuit, but Besnard went off again several laps later at the same place as where Jones had spun, calling for the sixth safety car of the race. When racing resumed, the order settled down into a rhythm once more, with Whincup leading Reynolds, Courtney, Caruso and Winterbottom. Davison, in the second factory-supported Ford, was constantly in trouble, pitting with tyres problems one lap and then being forced to make an unscheduled stop on the next. Van Gisbergen also found more trouble when Stone Brothers Racing miscalculated his teammate's lap count by one lap, leaving them with no option but to bring Van Gisbergen in and put Luke Youlden back in the car so that Youlden could complete the minimum fifty-four laps. D'Alberto's charge through the field from twenty-third ended abruptly when he encountered mechanical trouble and was recalled to the pits where he spent a lap sitting in his pit bay while the team tried to diagnose his problem; he was later retired.

Davison's day went from bad to worse; contact with teammate Youlden in the middle of the race had damaged his car, and the watts' linkage finally gave way forty laps later. Davison reported a roll bar snapping at the top of Conrod Straight, severing a brake line so that he found he had no brakes as he entered the Chase. He spun across the infield of the circuit, narrowly missing Fabian Coulthard – the #14 Commodore having been removed from the gravel trap again – and hitting the wall on the outside of the Chase. Davison was able to limp back to the pits and have the damage repaired, but he was taken completely out of contention by the incident. At the front of the pack, Whincup, Reynolds and Caruso pitted on lap 134, while Courtney tried to undercut them by pitting on lap 135, but lost third place to Caruso. Lowndes also pitting on lap 135 so as to avoid being double-stacked in the pit bay again. This marked the final pit stop of the race, thus allowing the front runners to make it to the finish without stopping again, but several pit crews warned their drivers that they would need to conserve fuel. Courtney, however, had an extra lap worth of fuel on-board compared to the other three drivers, which meant he had no such need to economise and took full advantage of it, passing Reynolds with twenty laps to go. Courtney's resurgence was short-lived; no sooner had he passed Reynolds than he was reporting problems with his tyres, and while he defended as best he could, Reynolds took the position back and set his sights on Whincup. Courtney was also rounded up by Michael Caruso and Lowndes, who had followed the same strategy as Courtney, but had managed his tyres properly. Lowndes was also able to pass Caruso for third, but Whincup and Reynolds were too far ahead for him to catch them, and Lowndes had to settle for third.

Meanwhile, Reynolds and Whincup were matching each other blow-for-blow. Where Whincup was becoming increasingly lean on fuel, Reynolds had the luxury of running his Falcon on the highest fuel setting, forcing Whincup to drive defensively. It soon became obvious that Reynolds was strongest down Conrod Straight, but was lacking traction at Hell Corner and The Dipper, and Whincup drove accordingly; aggressively through The Dipper to build up a lead down Conrod Straight, and then as defensively as he could through Murray's Corner and Hell Corner to build up a lead onto Mountain Straight. With each passing lap, Whincup was instructed by his pit wall to be increasingly conservative, while Reynolds was encouraged by his engineers to attack at every opportunity. In the end, Whincup picked his battles through The Dipper and Hell Corner to hold on for victory by just three tenths of a second, with Reynolds second and Lowndes third. James Courtney recovered late in the race to catch Caruso again, while Jonathon Webb and Scott McLaughlin were sixth ahead of Slade, Holdsworth, Russell Ingall and James Moffat completing the top ten. After struggling with tyre problems throughout the race, Mark Winterbottom was eleventh, while Will Davison's race ended in disaster, finishing twenty-fourth, eighteen laps down. The lone wildcard entry driven by Cam Waters and Jesse Dixon was classified twentieth of twenty-five finishers, three laps behind the leaders.

== Classification ==
=== Qualifying ===
Position	No.	Drivers	Entry	Car	Lap time	Difference	Grid
1	1	(Australia) Jamie Whincup (Australia) Paul Dumbrell	Triple Eight Race Engineering	Holden VE Commodore	2:07.7145		Top; 10
2	14	(New Zealand) Fabian Coulthard (Australia) David Besnard	Brad Jones Racing	Holden VE Commodore	2:07.7931	+0.0786	Top; 10
3	5	(Australia) Mark Winterbottom (New Zealand) Steven Richards	Ford Performance Racing	Ford FG Falcon	2:07.9231	+0.2086	Top; 10
4	6	(Australia) Will Davison (New Zealand) John McIntyre	Ford Performance Racing	Ford FG Falcon	2:07.9296	+0.2151	Top; 10
5	888	(Australia) Craig Lowndes (Australia) Warren Luff	Triple Eight Race Engineering	Holden VE Commodore	2:07.9663	+0.2518	Top; 10
6	9	(New Zealand) Shane van Gisbergen (Australia) Luke Youlden	Stone Brothers Racing	Ford FG Falcon	2:08.0799	+0.3654	Top; 10
7	47	(Australia) Tim Slade (Australia) Andrew Thompson	James Rosenberg Racing	Ford FG Falcon	2:08.0912	+0.3767	Top; 10
8	2	(Australia) Garth Tander (Australia) Nick Percat	Holden Racing Team	Holden VE Commodore	2:08.1045	+0.3900	Top; 10
9	49	(Australia) Steve Owen (Australia) Paul Morris	Paul Morris Motorsport	Ford FG Falcon	2:08.1386	+0.4241	Top; 10
10	52	(Australia) David Reynolds (Australia) Dean Canto	Rod Nash Racing	Ford FG Falcon	2:08.2312	+0.5167	Top; 10
11	19	(Australia) Jonathon Webb (New Zealand) Scott McLaughlin	Tekno Autosports	Holden VE Commodore	2:08.3040	+0.5895	11
12	8	(Australia) Jason Bright (Australia) Andrew Jones	Brad Jones Racing	Holden VE Commodore	2:08.3571	+0.6426	12
13	15	(Australia) Rick Kelly (Australia) David Russell	Kelly Racing	Holden VE Commodore	2:08.3925	+0.6780	13
14	22	(Australia) James Courtney (Australia) Cameron McConville	Holden Racing Team	Holden VE Commodore	2:08.4692	+0.7547	14
15	4	(Australia) Lee Holdsworth (New Zealand) Craig Baird	Stone Brothers Racing	Ford FG Falcon	2:08.5379	+0.8234	15
16	34	(Australia) Michael Caruso (Australia) Greg Ritter	Garry Rogers Motorsport	Holden VE Commodore	2:08.5409	+0.8264	16
17	17	(Australia) James Moffat (Australia) Alex Davison	Dick Johnson Racing	Ford FG Falcon	2:08.5849	+0.8704	17
18	18	(Australia) Steven Johnson (Denmark) Allan Simonsen	Dick Johnson Racing	Ford FG Falcon	2:08.6011	+0.8866	18
19	7	(Australia) Todd Kelly (Australia) Tim Blanchard	Kelly Racing	Holden VE Commodore	2:08.8235	+1.1090	19
20	91	(Australia) Michael Patrizi (New Zealand) Jonny Reid	Tekno Autosports	Holden VE Commodore	2:08.8240	+1.1095	25^{1}
21	12	(Australia) Dean Fiore (New Zealand) Matt Halliday	Triple F Racing	Ford FG Falcon	2:08.8253	+1.1108	20
22	21	(Australia) David Wall (New Zealand) Chris Pither	Britek Motorsport	Holden VE Commodore	2:08.9091	+1.1946	21
23	51	(New Zealand) Greg Murphy (Australia) Owen Kelly	Kelly Racing	Holden VE Commodore	2:08.9327	+1.2182	22
24	3	(Australia) Tony D'Alberto (Australia) Dale Wood	Tony D'Alberto Racing	Ford FG Falcon	2:08.9341	+1.2196	23
25	66	(Australia) Russell Ingall (Austria) Christian Klien	Walkinshaw Racing	Holden VE Commodore	2:08.9822	+1.2677	24
26	33	(Australia) Jack Perkins (France) Alexandre Prémat	Garry Rogers Motorsport	Holden VE Commodore	2:09.1725	+1.4580	26
27	30	(Australia) Taz Douglas (Australia) Scott Pye	Lucas Dumbrell Motorsport	Holden VE Commodore	2:09.2376	+1.5231	27
28	11	(Australia) Karl Reindler (New Zealand) Daniel Gaunt	Kelly Racing	Holden VE Commodore	2:09.3767	+1.6622	28
29	23	(Australia) Cam Waters (Australia) Jesse Dixon	Kelly Racing / Minda Motorsport	Holden VE Commodore	2:10.4865	+2.7720	29

Notes:

- ^1 – Michael Patrizi was handed a five-place grid penalty for blocking Jason Bright during Friday qualifying.

=== Top 10 Shootout ===
Position	No.	Driver	Entry	Running order	Qualifying time	Qualifying position	Shootout time	Final grid position
1	6	(Australia) Will Davison	Ford Performance Racing	7th	2:07.9296	4th	2:08.0693	1st
2	1	(Australia) Jamie Whincup	Triple Eight Race Engineering	10th	2:07.7145	1st	2:08.1008	2nd
3	9	(New Zealand) Shane van Gisbergen	Stone Brothers Racing	5th	2:08.0799	6th	2:08.1791	3rd
4	5	(Australia) Mark Winterbottom	Ford Performance Racing	8th	2:07.9231	3rd	2:08.1963	4th
5	14	(New Zealand) Fabian Coulthard	Brad Jones Racing	9th	2:07.7931	2nd	2:08.3385	5th
6	2	(Australia) Garth Tander	Holden Racing Team	3rd	2:08.1045	8th	2:08.4755	6th
7	47	(Australia) Tim Slade	James Rosenberg Racing	4th	2:08.0912	7th	2:08.5995	7th
8	52	(Australia) David Reynolds	Rod Nash Racing	1st	2:08.2312	10th	2:08.8866	8th
9	888	(Australia) Craig Lowndes	Triple Eight Race Engineering	6th	2:07.9663	5th	2:09.0997	9th
10	49	(Australia) Steve Owen	Paul Morris Motorsport	2nd	2:08.1386	9th	2:10.0723	10th

=== Race ===
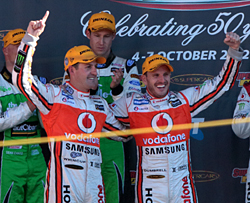
Jamie Whincup and Paul Dumbrell celebrate victory.

Position	No.	Drivers	Entry	Car	Laps	Time/retired	Grid	Points
1	1	(Australia) Jamie Whincup (Australia) Paul Dumbrell	Triple Eight Race Engineering	Holden VE Commodore	161	6:16:01.3304	2	300
2	52	(Australia) David Reynolds (Australia) Dean Canto	Rod Nash Racing	Ford FG Falcon	161	+0.3129	8	276
3	888	(Australia) Craig Lowndes (Australia) Warren Luff	Triple Eight Race Engineering	Holden VE Commodore	161	+8.7885	9	258
4	22	(Australia) James Courtney (Australia) Cameron McConville	Holden Racing Team	Holden VE Commodore	161	+9.5041	14	240
5	34	(Australia) Michael Caruso (Australia) Greg Ritter	Garry Rogers Motorsport	Holden VE Commodore	161	+11.1028	16	222
6	19	(Australia) Jonathon Webb (New Zealand) Scott McLaughlin	Tekno Autosports	Holden VE Commodore	161	+18.1852	11	204
7	47	(Australia) Tim Slade (Australia) Andrew Thompson	James Rosenberg Racing	Ford FG Falcon	161	+21.0434	7	192
8	4	(Australia) Lee Holdsworth (New Zealand) Craig Baird	Stone Brothers Racing	Ford FG Falcon	161	+27.6754	15	180
9	66	(Australia) Russell Ingall (Austria) Christian Klien	Walkinshaw Racing	Holden VE Commodore	161	+42.0565	24	168
10	17	(Australia) James Moffat (Australia) Alex Davison	Dick Johnson Racing	Ford FG Falcon	161	+44.7775	17	156
11	5	(Australia) Mark Winterbottom (New Zealand) Steven Richards	Ford Performance Racing	Ford FG Falcon	161	+54.9502	4	144
12	9	(New Zealand) Shane van Gisbergen (Australia) Luke Youlden	Stone Brothers Racing	Ford FG Falcon	161	+57.2911	3	138
13	51	(New Zealand) Greg Murphy (Australia) Owen Kelly	Kelly Racing	Holden VE Commodore	161	+1:00.2811	22	132
14	21	(Australia) David Wall (New Zealand) Chris Pither	Britek Motorsport	Holden VE Commodore	161	+1:15.7062	21	126
15	15	(Australia) Rick Kelly (Australia) David Russell	Kelly Racing	Holden VE Commodore	161	+1:24.2523	13	120
16	33	(Australia) Jack Perkins (France) Alexandre Prémat	Garry Rogers Motorsport	Holden VE Commodore	161	+1:34.3122	26	114
17	18	(Australia) Steven Johnson (Denmark) Allan Simonsen	Dick Johnson Racing	Ford FG Falcon	161	+1:34.5334	18	108
18	7	(Australia) Todd Kelly (Australia) Tim Blanchard	Kelly Racing	Holden VE Commodore	161	+1:46.2692	19	102
19	11	(Australia) Karl Reindler (New Zealand) Daniel Gaunt	Kelly Racing	Holden VE Commodore	161	+1:46.8905	28	96
20	23	(Australia) Cam Waters (Australia) Jesse Dixon	Kelly Racing / Minda Motorsport	Holden VE Commodore	158	+3 laps	29	90
21	8	(Australia) Jason Bright (Australia) Andrew Jones	Brad Jones Racing	Holden VE Commodore	153	+8 laps	12	84
22	12	(Australia) Dean Fiore (New Zealand) Matt Halliday	Triple F Racing	Ford FG Falcon	147	+14 laps	20	78
23	14	(New Zealand) Fabian Coulthard (Australia) David Besnard	Brad Jones Racing	Holden VE Commodore	147	+14 laps	5	72
24	6	(Australia) Will Davison (Australia) John McIntyre	Ford Performance Racing	Ford FG Falcon	143	+18 laps	1	66
25	2	(Australia) Garth Tander (Australia) Nick Percat	Holden Racing Team	Holden VE Commodore	139	+22 laps	6	60
Ret	3	(Australia) Tony D'Alberto (Australia) Dale Wood	Tony D'Alberto Racing	Ford FG Falcon	122	Brakes	23	
Ret	30	(Australia) Taz Douglas (Australia) Scott Pye	Lucas Dumbrell Motorsport	Holden VE Commodore	97	Engine	27	
Ret	49	(Australia) Steve Owen (Australia) Paul Morris	Paul Morris Motorsport	Ford FG Falcon	53	Crash	10	
Ret	91	(Australia) Michael Patrizi (New Zealand) Jonny Reid	Tekno Autosports	Holden VE Commodore	19	Driveline	25	

== 50th year celebrations ==
Teams competing in the race chose to commemorate the fiftieth year of the event, with several commissioning special liveries inspired by historic race-winning cars:

- The #18 Falcon of James Moffat and Alex Davison was modelled after the "Tru-Blu" Ford XD Falcon driven by team principal Dick Johnson at the 1980 Hardie-Ferodo 1000. The car was also re-numbered to carry the number 17, which was used by Johnson in the 1980 race. The Steven Johnson—Allan Simonsen entry, which usually carried the number 17 during the regular season, was reassigned as #18.
- Ford Performance Racing commissioned liveries for the Falcons of Mark Winterbottom and Steven Richards, and of Will Davison and John McIntyre, based on the liveries used by the Moffat Ford Dealers team when they claimed a one-two finish in 1977.
- The David Reynolds—Dean Canto entry was restyled after the livery used by Harry Firth and Fred Gibson when they won the 1967 race. The car's number was also changed from #55 to #52 to further reflect the 1967 livery.
- Karl Reindler and Daniel Gaunt designed a "new retro" livery for the #11 Holden VE Commodore loosely inspired by cars of the 1960s.
- Craig Lowndes paid tribute to his mentor and nine-time Bathurst winner Peter Brock with a replica of the livery used by Brock when he won the 1982 event. However, the car carried Lowndes' #888 instead of Brock's traditional number, 05, as the number was retired by the Confederation of Australian Motor Sport as a mark of respect upon Brock's death in 2006. The design also carried minor modifications as the original car was sponsored by Marlboro; as tobacco sponsorship of sporting teams and events had been banned in Australia since 1995, the changes were needed to prevent the car violating these laws.

Several other teams also raced with special liveries, but these were not inspired by historic designs. These entries included:

- Kelly Racing's Jack Daniel's entries stripes turned from white to gold to represent the 50th running of the race, whilst the #51 of Murphy/O.Kelly had a revised Pepsi Max Kick livery.
- Stone Brothers Racing #9 entry saw fluorescent orange highlights added to the existing SP Tools livery.
- The #19 and #91 entries from Tekno Autosports received individual changes, with the incorporation of a full livery on the #19 for sponsor Sargent Security and single event sponsorship from Hawkins Transport Queensland for the #91.
- The #21 Britek Motorsport entry saw Wilson Security's annual livery change for Bathurst embracing their partnership with the McGrath Foundation.
- Walkinshaw Racing's #66 entry featured prominent Supercheap Auto "Club Plus" branding to promote the car parts chain's new membership offer.

== Standings ==
- After 21 of 30 races.

Pos	No	Name	Team	Points
1	1	Jamie Whincup	Triple Eight Race Engineering	2772
2	888	Craig Lowndes	Triple Eight Race Engineering	2611
3	5	Mark Winterbottom	Ford Performance Racing	2584
4	6	Will Davison	Ford Performance Racing	2302
5	9	Shane van Gisbergen	Stone Brothers Racing	2020

== Broadcast ==
The race was covered by the Seven Network for the sixth consecutive season. Having commentated on sprint rounds since 2009, Mark Skaife featured in the Bathurst 1000 commentary line-up for the first time. Seven's horse racing commentator Neil Kearney made select appearances as a roving reporter at the top of the mountain during the race.

Seven Network
Booth: Neil Crompton, Mark Skaife, Matthew White
Pit-lane: Mark Beretta, Mark Larkham
Roving: Neil Kearney
