= Jonathon Webb =

Australian racing driver

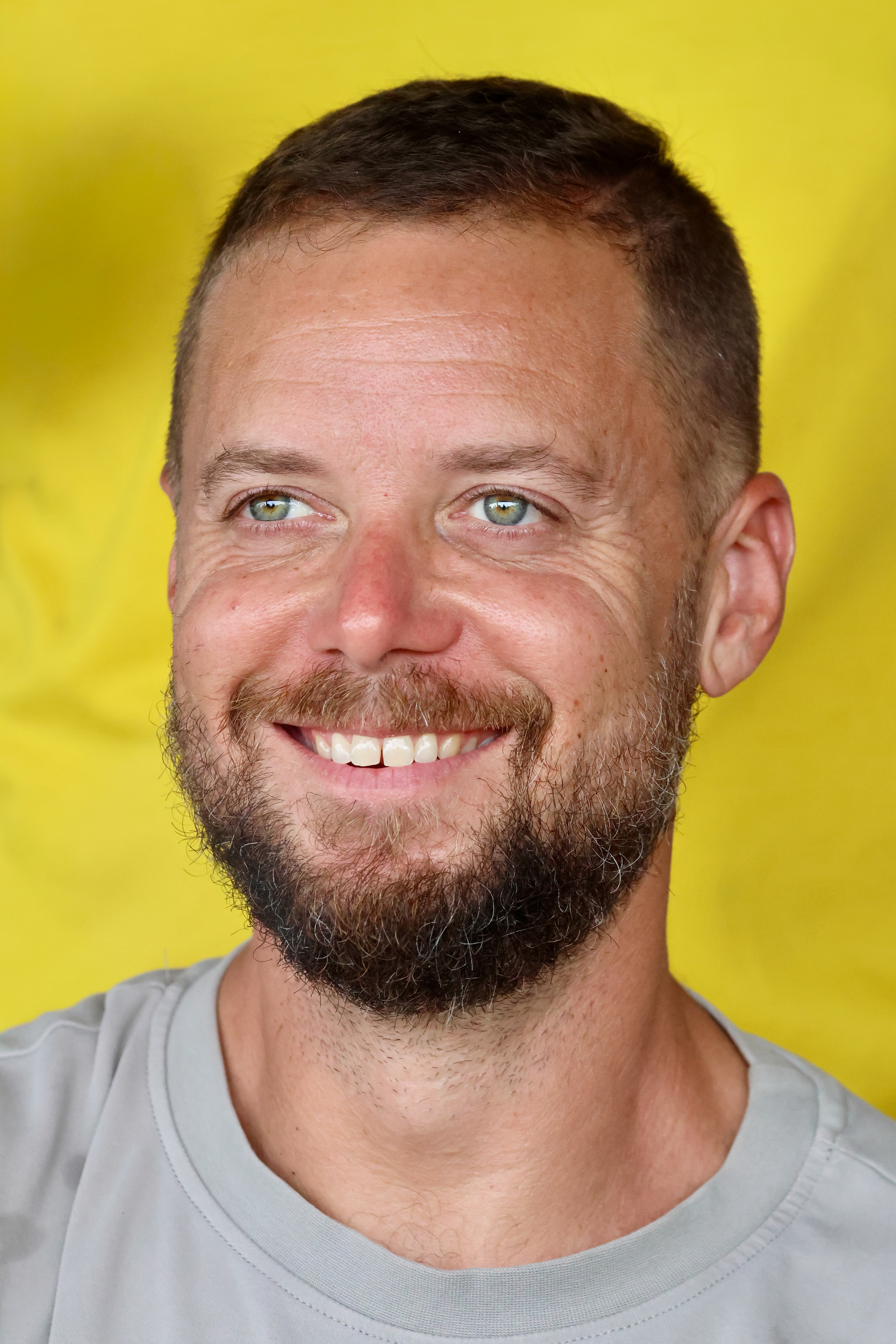
- Webb at the 2026 Adelaide Motorsport Festival
- Nationality: Australian
- Born: Jonathon Stephen Webb; 10 December 1983 (age 42) Castle Hill, New South Wales
- Categorisation: FIA Silver (until 2017, 2023–); FIA Gold (2018–2022)

Supercars Championship career
- Current team: PremiAir Racing (Endurance race co-driver)
- Championships: 0
- Races: 151
- Wins: 4
- Podiums: 8
- Pole positions: 0
- 2020 position: 37th (138 pts)

Jonathon Stephen Webb (born 10 December 1983) is an Australian former professional racing driver and team owner of Tekno Autosports, who often co-drove a Holden Commodore in V8 Supercars' Enduro Cup.

In 2016, Webb won both of Australia's most prestigious motor races, the Bathurst 1000 and the Bathurst 12 Hour.

== Racing history ==
=== Early career ===
Webb, a former BMX bicycle racing champion, first came to national attention racing Porsches out of the family-run Tekno Autosports team which had previously operated racing cars for his father Steve. Webb spent several years racing in the Australian Carrera Cup Championship finishing eighth in the inaugural 2003 series. Webb's best run with Carrera Cup was third place in the 2005 series. The following year, Webb made his debut in V8 Supercar as a co-driver in the endurance races for Marcus Marshall in a Paul Cruickshank Racing-prepared Ford BF Falcon.

In 2007, Webb focused full-time on V8 Supercar racing, taking the family Tekno Autosports team into the second-tier Fujitsu V8 Supercar Series, in a Stone Brothers Racing-prepared Ford Falcon. Webb finished fourth in his first season, improving to third in 2008. In 2009 Webb moved to the MW Motorsport team, a professional Fujitsu Series team for an assault on the championship. In the second half of the series, Webb won six out of the last seven races in the season in an irresistible charge to the championship crown. Webb began his association with Dick Johnson Racing in 2009, taking part in his fourth season as an endurance race co-driver in the V8 Supercar Championship Series.

=== Supercars Championship ===
Webb continued this involvement into 2010, having secured a former Britek Motorsport Racing Entitlement Contract for the Tekno Autosport team. Tekno formed a technical alliance with Dick Johnson Racing, with Webb's car to effectively become the team's third car, with ownership of the franchise remaining with the Webb family. Tekno secured race number 19 from the Sieders Racing Team to use for 2010, to match DJR's existing cars, 17 (Steven Johnson) and 18 (James Courtney). Mother energy drink became the major sponsor of the #19 Ford from the 2010 Sucrogen Townsville 400. Webb won his first V8 Supercar race on the Saturday at the 2010 Sydney Telstra 500 in wet conditions.

For the 2011 season, Tekno Autosports was re-established as an independent racing team and sourced a Holden VE Commodore from Triple Eight Race Engineering. The team gradually moved forward, expanding to a second car in 2012 and matching the results Webb achieved in 2010 in the DJR fold. Despite not winning a race, Webb was the event winner of the Skycity Triple Crown in 2013. Following the 2013 season, the team downgraded to a single car for Shane van Gisbergen, leaving Webb without a full-time drive. He continued to drive for the team for the three endurance races, Sandown, Bathurst and Surfers Paradise, which collectively became known as the Enduro Cup in 2013. Alongside van Gisbergen, Webb won a race at the Gold Coast 600 in both 2014 and 2015.

In 2016, with van Gisbergen having departed the team, Webb paired with Will Davison for the Enduro Cup. Having finished third at the Sandown 500, the pairing capitalised on late drama, including a late-race penalty for Jamie Whincup, to win the Bathurst 1000.

=== GT ===
Webb won the Dubai 24 Hour in 2008, alongside Craig Baird, Klark Quinn and Tony Quinn in a Porsche 997 GT3-RSR. In 2016, he won the Bathurst 12 Hour in a McLaren 650S entered by Tekno Autosports, alongside Van Gisbergen and Álvaro Parente.

== Career results ==
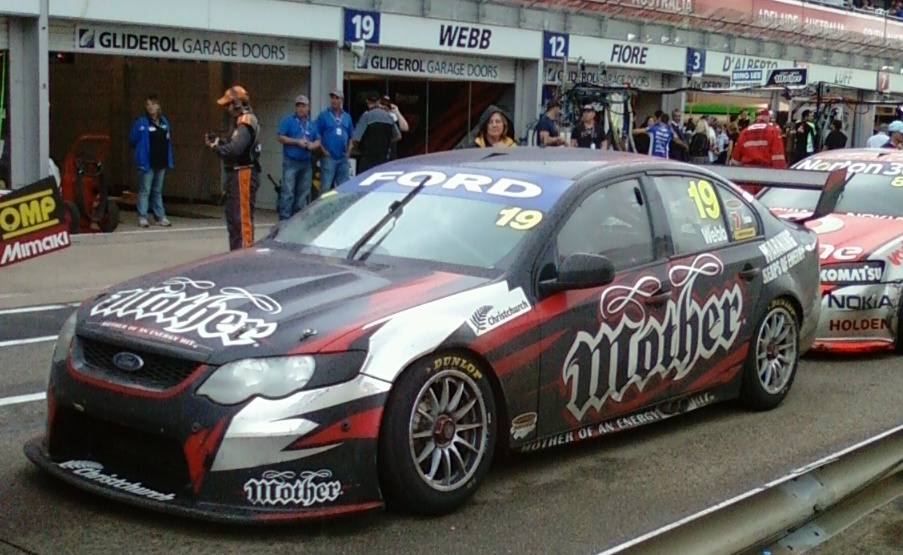
The Ford FG Falcon of Jonathon Webb at the 2011 Clipsal 500 Adelaide

Season	Series	Position	Car	Team
2002	Australian Porsche Cup	**2nd**	Porsche 911 GT3	Tekno Autosports
2003	Australian Carrera Cup Championship	8th	Porsche 996 GT3 Cup	Tekno Autosports
2003	Australian Nations Cup Championship	25th	Porsche 911 GT3 Carrera	Tekno Autosports
2004	Australian Carrera Cup Championship	6th	Porsche 996 GT3 Cup	Tekno Autosports
2004/05	Carrera Cup New Zealand	**3rd**	Porsche 996 GT3 Cup	
2005	Australian Carrera Cup Championship	**3rd**	Porsche 996 GT3 Cup	Tekno Autosports
2006	Australian Carrera Cup Championship	5th	Porsche 997 GT3 Cup	Paul Cruickshank Racing
2006	V8 Supercar Championship Series	61st	Ford BA Falcon	Paul Cruickshank Racing
2007	Fujitsu V8 Supercar Series	4th	Ford BA Falcon	Stone Brothers Racing
2007	V8 Supercar Championship Series	42nd	Ford BA Falcon	Paul Cruickshank Racing
2008	Fujitsu V8 Supercar Series	**3rd**	Ford BA Falcon	Stone Brothers Racing
2008	V8 Supercar Championship Series	48th	Ford BA Falcon	Stone Brothers Racing
2009	Fujitsu V8 Supercar Series	**1st**	Ford BF Falcon	MW Motorsport
2009	V8 Supercar Championship Series	47th	Ford FG Falcon	Dick Johnson Racing
2009	Australian Mini Challenge	20th	Mini Cooper S	Motorline Mini Garage
2010	V8 Supercar Championship Series	13th	Ford FG Falcon	Tekno Autosports
2011	International V8 Supercars Championship	21st	Ford FG Falcon	Tekno Autosports
2012	V8SuperTourer Championship	8th	Holden VE Commodore	MPC Motorsport
2012	International V8 Supercars Championship	12th	Holden VE Commodore	Tekno Autosports
2013	V8SuperTourers Championship	28th	Holden VE Commodore	Scott McLaughlin Racing
2013	International V8 Supercars Championship	12th	Holden VF Commodore	Tekno Autosports
2014	International V8 Supercars Championship	28th	Holden VF Commodore	Tekno Autosports
2015	Australian GT Championship	39th	McLaren MP4-12C	Darrell Lea
2015	V8 Supercars Dunlop Series	30th	Ford FG Falcon	Image Racing
2015	International V8 Supercars Championship	30th	Holden VF Commodore	Tekno Autosports
2016	International V8 Supercars Championship	27th	Holden VF Commodore	Tekno Autosports
2016	Australian GT Championship	14th	McLaren 650S GT3	Tekno Autosports
2016	Intercontinental GT Challenge	7th	McLaren 650S GT3	Tekno Autosports
2017	Virgin Australia Supercars Championship	42nd	Holden VF Commodore	Tekno Autosports
2018	Virgin Australia Supercars Championship	44th	Holden ZB Commodore	Tekno Autosports
2019	Virgin Australia Supercars Championship	42nd	Holden ZB Commodore	Tekno Autosports
2020	Virgin Australia Supercars Championship	37th	Holden ZB Commodore	Team Sydney by Tekno

=== Super2 Series results ===
(key) (Races in bold indicate pole position) (Races in italics indicate fastest lap)

Super2 Series results
Year	Team	No.	Car	1	2	3	4	5	6	7	8	9	10	11	12	13	14	15	16	17	18	Position	Points
2007	Stone Brothers Racing	94	Ford BA Falcon	ADE; R1; 3	ADE; R2; 5	WAK; R3; 8	WAK; R4; 1	WAK; R5; 9	WIN; R6; 24	WIN; R7; 12	WIN; R8; Ret	QLD; R9; 13	QLD; R10; 8	QLD; R11; 4	ORA; R12; 4	ORA; R13; 3	ORA; R14; 4	BAT; R15; Ret	BAT; R16; 10	PHI; R17; 3	PHI; R18; Ret	4th	206
2008	Stone Brothers Racing	94	Ford BA Falcon	ADE; R1; 9	ADE; R2; 19	WAK; R3; 3	WAK; R4; 5	WAK; R5; 7	SAN; R6; 6	SAN; R7; 3	SAN; R8; 4	QLD; R9; 3	QLD; R10; 13	QLD; R11; 4	WIN; R12; 6	WIN; R13; 8	WIN; R14; 4	BAT; R15; 1	**BAT**; **R16**; 2	ORA; R17; 3	ORA; R18; 6	3rd	1527
2009	MW Motorsport	26	Ford BF Falcon	ADE; R1; 4	ADE; R2; 2	WIN; R3; 4	WIN; R4; 3	WIN; R5; 3	TOW; R6; 2	TOW; R7; 2	TOW; R8; 4	SAN; R9; 4	SAN; R10; 12	SAN; R11; 3	**QLD**; **R12**; 1	**QLD**; **R13**; 1	**QLD**; **R14**; 1	**BAT**; **R15**; 1	**BAT**; **R16**; 1	SYD; R17; 2	SYD; R18; 1	1st	1874
2015	Image Racing	10	Ford FG Falcon	ADE; R1	ADE; R2	BAR; R3	BAR; R4	BAR; R5	WIN; R6	WIN; R7	WIN; R8	TOW; R9	TOW; R10	QLD; R11	QLD; R12	QLD; R13	BAT; R14	SYD; R15; 12	SYD; R16; 5			30th	180
2024	Eggleston Motorsport	88	Holden ZB Commodore	BAT1; R1	BAT1; R2	BAR; R3	BAR; R4	TOW; R5	TOW; R6	SAN; R7	SAN; R8	BAT2; R9; 10	BAT2; R10; 10	ADE; R11	ADE; R12							24th	156
2025	Masterton Motorsport	19	Ford Mustang S550	SYD; R1	SYD; R2	SYM; R3	SYM; R4	TOW; R5	TOW; R6	QLD; R7	QLD; R8	BAT2; R9; 11	BAT2; R10; 10	ADE; R11	ADE; R12							24th	150

=== Supercars Championship results ===
(key) (Races in bold indicate pole position) (Races in italics indicate fastest lap)

Supercars results
Year	Team	No.	Car	1	2	3	4	5	6	7	8	9	10	11	12	13	14	15	16	17	18	19	20	21	22	23	24	25	26	27	28	29	30	31	32	33	34	35	36	37	38	39	Position	Points
2006	Paul Cruickshank Racing	20	Ford BA Falcon	ADE; R1	ADE; R2	PUK; R3	PUK; R4	PUK; R5	BAR; R6	BAR; R7	BAR; R8	WIN; R9	WIN; R10	WIN; R11	HDV; R12	HDV; R13	HDV; R14	QLD; R15	QLD; R16	QLD; R17	ORA; R18	ORA; R19	ORA; R20	SAN; R21; 25	BAT; R22; Ret	SUR; R23	SUR; R24	SUR; R25	SYM; R26	SYM; R27	SYM; R28	BHR; R29	BHR; R30	BHR; R31	PHI; R32	PHI; R33	PHI; R34						62nd	80
2007	Paul Cruickshank Racing	111	Ford BF Falcon	ADE; R1	ADE; R2	BAR; R3	BAR; R4	BAR; R5	PUK; R6	PUK; R7	PUK; R8	WIN; R9	WIN; R10	WIN; R11	EAS; R12	EAS; R13	EAS; R14	HDV; R15	HDV; R16	HDV; R17	QLD; R18	QLD; R19	QLD; R20	ORA; R21	ORA; R22	ORA; R23	SAN; R24; 12	BAT; R25; 14	SUR; R26	SUR; R27	SUR; R28	BHR; R29	BHR; R30	BHR; R31	SYM; R32	SYM; R33	SYM; R34	PHI; R35	PHI; R36	PHI; R37			42nd	25
2008	Stone Brothers Racing	9	Ford BF Falcon	ADE; R1	ADE; R2	EAS; R3; PO	EAS; R4; PO	EAS; R5; PO	HAM; R6	HAM; R7	HAM; R8	BAR; R9	BAR; R10	BAR; R11	SAN; R12	SAN; R13	SAN; R14	HDV; R15	HDV; R16	HDV; R17	QLD; R18	QLD; R19	QLD; R20	WIN; R21	WIN; R22	WIN; R23	PHI; QR; 16	PHI; R24; 10	BAT; R25; Ret	SUR; R26	SUR; R27	SUR; R28	BHR; R29	BHR; R30	BHR; R31	SYM; R32	SYM; R33	SYM; R34	ORA; R35	ORA; R36	ORA; R37		48th	190
2009	Dick Johnson Racing	18	Ford FG Falcon	ADE; R1	ADE; R2	HAM; R3	HAM; R4	WIN; R5	WIN; R6	SYM; R7	SYM; R8	HDV; R9	HDV; R10	TOW; R11	TOW; R12	SAN; R13	SAN; R14	QLD; R15	QLD; R16	PHI; QR; 9	PHI; R17; 6	BAT; R18; Ret	SUR; R19	SUR; R20	SUR; R21	SUR; R22	PHI; R23	PHI; R24	BAR; R25	BAR; R26	SYD; R27	SYD; R28											48th	182
2010	Tekno Autosports	19	Ford FG Falcon	YMC; R1; 8	YMC; R2; 18	BHR; R3; 14	BHR; R4; 16	ADE; R5; 15	ADE; R6; 15	HAM; R7; 13	HAM; R8; 10	QLD; R9; 10	QLD; R10; 12	WIN; R11; 26	WIN; R12; 11	HDV; R13; 24	HDV; R14; 13	TOW; R15; 16	TOW; R16; 9	PHI; QR; 18	PHI; R17; 6	BAT; R18; 19	SUR; R19; 8	SUR; R20; 16	SYM; R21; 18	SYM; R22; 16	SAN; R23; 20	SAN; R24; 9	SYD; R25; 1	SYD; R26; 10													13th	1852
2011	Tekno Autosports	19	Ford FG Falcon	YMC; R1; 20	YMC; R2; 6	ADE; R3; 14	ADE; R4; 11	HAM; R5; Ret	HAM; R6; 12	BAR; R7; 20	BAR; R8; 15	BAR; R9; 23	WIN; R10; 24	WIN; R11; 12	HID; R12; 22	HID; R13; 16	TOW; R14; 21	TOW; R15; Ret	QLD; R16; 26	QLD; R17; 20	QLD; R18; 22	PHI; QR; 13	PHI; R19; 18	BAT; R20; 13	SUR; R21; 9	SUR; R22; 13	SYM; R23; 21	SYM; R24; 9	SAN; R25; 11	SAN; R26; 16	SYD; R27; Ret	SYD; R28; 4											21st	1493
2012	Tekno Autosports	19	Holden VE Commodore	ADE; R1; 23	ADE; R2; DNS	SYM; R3; Ret	SYM; R4; 9	HAM; R5; 19	HAM; R6; 13	BAR; R7; 14	BAR; R8; 21	BAR; R9; 20	PHI; R10; 7	PHI; R11; 7	HID; R12; 9	HID; R13; 15	TOW; R14; 19	TOW; R15; 8	QLD; R16; Ret	QLD; R17; Ret	SMP; R18; 9	SMP; R19; 17	SAN; QR; 9	SAN; R20; 10	BAT; R21; 6	SUR; R22; 2	SUR; R23; 14	YMC; R24; 10	YMC; R25; 9	YMC; R26; EX	WIN; R27; 7	WIN; R28; 7	SYD; R29; 4	SYD; R30; 6									12th	1987
2013	Tekno Autosports	19	Holden VF Commodore	ADE; R1; 8	ADE; R2; 10	SYM; R3; 10	SYM; R4; 11	SYM; R5; 7	PUK; R6; 10	PUK; R7; 11	PUK; R8; 8	PUK; R9; 18	BAR; R10; 16	BAR; R11; 22	BAR; R12; 19	COA; R13; 7	COA; R14; 4	COA; R15; 4	COA; R16; 9	HID; R17; 4	HID; R18; 6	HID; R19; 4	TOW; R20; 22	TOW; R21; 12	QLD; R22; 26	QLD; R23; 15	QLD; R24; 14	WIN; R25; 20	WIN; R26; 24	WIN; R27; 22	SAN; QR; 23	SAN; R28; 13	BAT; R29; 12	SUR; R30; 10	SUR; R31; 17	PHI; R32; 18	PHI; R33; 18	PHI; R34; Ret	SYD; R35; 2	SYD; R36; 23			12th	1901
2014	Tekno Autosports	97	Holden VF Commodore	ADE; R1	ADE; R2	ADE; R3	SYM; R4	SYM; R5	SYM; R6	WIN; R7	WIN; R8	WIN; R9	PUK; R10	PUK; R11	PUK; R12	PUK; R13	BAR; R14; PO	BAR; R15; PO	BAR; R16; PO	HID; R17	HID; R18	HID; R19	TOW; R20; PO	TOW; R21; PO	TOW; R22; PO	QLD; R23	QLD; R24	QLD; R25	SMP; R26	SMP; R27	SMP; R28	SAN; QR; 2	SAN; R29; 6	BAT; R30; 16	SUR; R31; 1	SUR; R32; 5	PHI; R33	PHI; R34	PHI; R35	SYD; R36	SYD; R37	SYD; R38	28th	579
2015	Tekno Autosports	97	Holden VF Commodore	ADE; R1	ADE; R2	ADE; R3	SYM; R4	SYM; R5	SYM; R6	BAR; R7; PO	BAR; R8; PO	BAR; R9; PO	WIN; R10	WIN; R11	WIN; R12	HID; R13	HID; R14	HID; R15	TOW; R16	TOW; R17	QLD; R18; PO	QLD; R19; PO	QLD; R20; PO	SMP; R21	SMP; R22	SMP; R23	SAN; QR; 5	SAN; R24; 3	BAT; R25; 8	SUR; R26; 1	SUR; R27; 5	PUK; R28	PUK; R29	PUK; R30	PHI; R31	PHI; R32	PHI; R33	SYD; R34	SYD; R35	SYD; R36			30th	699
2016	Tekno Autosports	19	Holden VF Commodore	ADE; R1	ADE; R2	ADE; R3	SYM; R4	SYM; R5	PHI; R6	PHI; R7	BAR; R8	BAR; R9	WIN; R10; PO	WIN; R11; PO	HID; R12	HID; R13	TOW; R14	TOW; R15	QLD; R16; PO	QLD; R17; PO	SMP; R18	SMP; R19	SAN; QR; 4	SAN; R20; 3	BAT; R21; 1	SUR; R22; 16	SUR; R23; 13	PUK; R24	PUK; R25	PUK; R26	PUK; R27	SYD; R28	SYD; R29										27th	681
2017	Tekno Autosports	19	Holden VF Commodore	ADE; R1	ADE; R2	SYM; R3	SYM; R4	PHI; R5	PHI; R6	BAR; R7	BAR; R8	WIN; R9; PO	WIN; R10; PO	HID; R11	HID; R12	TOW; R13	TOW; R14	QLD; R15; PO	QLD; R16; PO	SMP; R17	SMP; R18	SAN; QR; 24	SAN; R19; 12	BAT; R20; 14	SUR; R21; 20	SUR; R22; 14	PUK; R23	PUK; R24	NEW; R25	NEW; R26													42nd	372
2018	Tekno Autosports	19	Holden ZB Commodore	ADE; R1	ADE; R2	MEL; R3	MEL; R4	MEL; R5	MEL; R6	SYM; R7	SYM; R8	PHI; R9	PHI; R10	BAR; R11	BAR; R12	WIN; R13	WIN; R14	HID; R15	HID; R16	TOW; R17	TOW; R18	QLD; R19; PO	QLD; R20; PO	SMP; R21	BEN; R22	BEN; R23	SAN; QR; 21	SAN; R24; 22	BAT; R25; 15	SUR; R26; 16	SUR; R27; C	PUK; R28	PUK; R29	NEW; R30	NEW; R31								44th	255
2019	Tekno Autosports	19	Holden ZB Commodore	ADE; R1	ADE; R2	MEL; R3	MEL; R4	MEL; R5	MEL; R6	SYM; R7	SYM; R8	PHI; R9	PHI; R10	BAR; R11	BAR; R12	WIN; R13	WIN; R14	HID; R15	HID; R16	TOW; R17	TOW; R18	QLD; R19	QLD; R20	BEN; R21	BEN; R22	PUK; R23	PUK; R24	BAT; R25; 17	SUR; R26; 13	SUR; R27; 13	SAN; QR; 20	SAN; R28; 19	NEW; R29	NEW; R30									42nd	335
2020	Team Sydney by Tekno	19	Holden ZB Commodore	ADE; R1	ADE; R2	MEL; R3	MEL; R4	MEL; R5	MEL; R6	SMP1; R7	SMP1; R8	SMP1; R9	SMP2; R10	SMP2; R11	SMP2; R12	HID1; R13	HID1; R14	HID1; R15	HID2; R16	HID2; R17	HID2; R18	TOW1; R19	TOW1; R20	TOW1; R21	TOW2; R22	TOW2; R23	TOW2; R24	BEN1; R25	BEN1; R26	BEN1; R27	BEN2; R28	BEN2; R29	BEN2; R30	BAT; R31; 12									37th	138
2023	PremiAir Racing	23	Chevrolet Camaro ZL1	NEW; R1	NEW; R2	MEL; R3	MEL; R4	MEL; R5	MEL; R6	BAR; R7	BAR; R8	BAR; R9	SYM; R10	SYM; R11	SYM; R12	HID; R13	HID; R14	HID; R15	TOW; R16	TOW; R17	SMP; R18	SMP; R19	BEN; R20	BEN; R21	BEN; R22	SAN; R23; 9	BAT; R24; 13	SUR; R25	SUR; R26	ADE; R27	ADE; R28												36th	300

=== Complete Intercontinental GT Challenge Series results ===
(key) (Races in bold indicate pole position) (Races in italics indicate fastest lap)

Year	Entrant	Class	Chassis	1	2	3	Rank	Points
2016	Tekno Autosports	AP	McLaren 650S GT3	**BAT**; 1	SPA	SEP	7th	25

=== Complete Bathurst 1000 results ===
Year	Team	Car	Co-driver	Position	Laps
2006	Paul Cruickshank Racing	Ford Falcon BA	(Australia) Marcus Marshall	DNF	90
2007	Paul Cruickshank Racing	Ford Falcon BF	(Australia) John Bowe	14th	160
2008	Stone Brothers Racing	Ford Falcon BF	(New Zealand) Shane van Gisbergen	DNF	91
2009	Dick Johnson Racing	Ford Falcon FG	(Australia) Warren Luff	DNF	84
2010	Tekno Autosports	Ford Falcon FG	(Australia) David Russell	19th	161
2011	Tekno Autosports	Ford Falcon FG	(United Kingdom) Richard Lyons	13th	161
2012	Tekno Autosports	Holden Commodore VE	(New Zealand) Scott McLaughlin	6th	161
2013	Tekno Autosports	Holden Commodore VF	(Germany) Marc Lieb	12th	161
2014	Tekno Autosports	Holden Commodore VF	(New Zealand) Shane van Gisbergen	16th	158
2015	Tekno Autosports	Holden Commodore VF	(New Zealand) Shane van Gisbergen	8th	161
2016	Tekno Autosports	Holden Commodore VF	(Australia) Will Davison	**1st**	161
2017	Tekno Autosports	Holden Commodore VF	(Australia) Will Davison	14th	159
2018	Tekno Autosports	Holden Commodore ZB	(Australia) Jack Le Brocq	15th	161
2019	Tekno Autosports	Holden Commodore ZB	(Australia) Jack Le Brocq	17th	160
2020	Tekno Autosports	Holden Commodore ZB	(Australia) Alex Davison	12th	161
2021	Tekno Autosports	Holden Commodore ZB	(New Zealand) Fabian Coulthard	19th	156
2023	PremiAir Racing	Chevrolet Camaro Mk.6	(Australia) Tim Slade	13th	161

=== Complete Bathurst 12 Hour results ===
Year	Team	Co-drivers	Car	Class	Laps	Overall position	Class position
2009	(Australia) Rockstar Energy Drink	(Australia) Josh Hunt (Australia) Paul Stokell	Nissan 350Z	B	149	DNF	DNF
2016	(Australia) Tekno Autosports	(Portugal) Álvaro Parente (New Zealand) Shane van Gisbergen	McLaren 650S GT3	AP	297	**1st**	**1st**

Sporting positions
Preceded by Craig Lowndes; Steven Richards	Winner of the Bathurst 1000; 2016 (with Will Davison)	Succeeded by David Reynolds; Luke Youlden
Preceded by Katsumasa Chiyo; Wolfgang Reip; Florian Strauss	Winner of the Bathurst 12 Hour; 2016 (with Álvaro Parente & Shane van Gisbergen)	Succeeded by Craig Lowndes; Toni Vilander; Jamie Whincup
Preceded by Steve Owen	Winner of the Fujitsu V8 Supercars Series; 2009	Succeeded by Steve Owen
