= 2003 Australian Carrera Cup Championship =

Motor racing competition

The 2003 Australian Carrera Cup Championship was a CAMS sanctioned national motor racing championship open to Porsche 911 GT3 Cup Type 996 cars complying with Australian Carrera Cup regulations. The championship, which was administered by CupCar Australia Pty Ltd, was the inaugural Australian Carrera Cup Championship.

== Calendar ==
The championship was contested over a nine-round series with three races per round.

Rnd	Circuit	State	Date
1	(South Australia) Phillip Island Grand Prix Circuit	Phillip Island, Victoria	11–13 April
2	(New South Wales) Eastern Creek International Raceway	Sydney, New South Wales	2–4 May
3	(Victoria (state)) Winton Motor Raceway	Benalla, Victoria	23–25 May
4	(Northern Territory) Hidden Valley Raceway	Darwin, Northern Territory	27–29 June
5	Queensland Raceway, Ipswich	Ipswich, Queensland	18–20 July
6	(Victoria (state)) Sandown Raceway	Melbourne, Victoria	12–14 September
7	(New South Wales) Mount Panorama Circuit, Bathurst	Bathurst, New South Wales	10–12 October
8	(Queensland) Surfers Paradise Street Circuit	Surfers Paradise, Queensland	24–26 October
9	(New South Wales) Eastern Creek International Raceway	Sydney, New South Wales	28–30 November

== Teams and drivers ==
Team	No.	Driver	Rounds
(Australia) Mog Sport	4	(Australia) Geoff Morgan	
(New Zealand) Jim Richards Racing	5	(New Zealand) Jim Richards	
(Australia) Skye Sands Racing	6	(Australia) Rusty French	
(Australia) Rodney Jane Racing	7	(Australia) Rodney Jane	
(Australia) SportsMed SA	8	(Australia) Greg Keene	
(Australia) European Technique	9	(Australia) Dean Cook	
(Australia) European Technique	11	(Australia) Chris Seidler	
(Australia) Team Becks Racing	10	(Australia) Dean Grant	
(Australia) Adamco	12	(Australia) Marc Cini	
(New Zealand) International Motorsport NZ	15	(Australia) Charlie O'Brien	
(New Zealand) International Motorsport NZ	82	(New Zealand) Andrew Bagnall	
(New Zealand) International Motorsport NZ	86	(New Zealand) Kevin Bell	
(New Zealand) International Motorsport NZ	96	(New Zealand) Paul Pedersen	
(New Zealand) International Motorsport NZ	99	(New Zealand) Rick Armstrong	
(Australia) Taplin Real Estate	18	(Australia) Andrew Taplin	
(Australia) Tekno Autosports	22	(Australia) Jonathon Webb	
(Australia) RT Motorsport	23	(Australia) Klark Quinn	
(Australia) RT Motorsport	23	(Australia) Mark Howard	
(Australia) RT Motorsport	23	(Australia) Tim Pritchard	
(Australia) Pro-Floor Motorsport	24	(Australia) Paul Blackie	
(Australia) Brook Motorsport	24	(Australia) Stephen Borness	
(Australia) Dutton Motorsport	26	(Australia) James Dutton	
(Australia) JAM Racing	28	(Australia) David Scaysbrook	
(Australia) VIP Pet Foods Racing	31	(Australia) Marcus Marshall	
(Australia) VIP Pet Foods Racing	32	(United Kingdom) Tony Quinn	
(Australia) Fitzgerald Racing	33	(Australia) Peter Fitzgerald	
(Australia) Miedecke Motorsport	35	(Australia) Andrew Miedecke	
(New Zealand) Greg Murphy Racing	44	(Australia) Roger Oakeshott	
(New Zealand) Greg Murphy Racing	55	(Australia) Tim Leahey	
(New Zealand) Greg Murphy Racing	66	(Australia) Peter Hill	
(New Zealand) Greg Murphy Racing	66	(Australia) Alex Davison	
(Australia) Team Terrier	51	(Australia) Jack Crocker	
(Australia) Team Terrier	52	(Australia) Russell Wright	
(Australia) Matt Coleman Racing	62	(Australia) Matthew Coleman	
(Australia) Natural Blonde Racing	77	(Australia) Scott Shearman	
(Australia) Statewide GT Racing	88	(Australia) John Teulan	

== Results ==
Rd	Race	Circuit	Pole Position	Fastest Lap	Drivers' Winner	Teams' Winner	Round Winner
1	1	(Victoria (state)) Phillip Island	(New Zealand) Jim Richards	(New Zealand) Jim Richards	(New Zealand) Jim Richards	Jim Richards Racing	(New Zealand) Jim Richards
1	2	(Victoria (state)) Phillip Island		(Australia) Marcus Marshall	(New Zealand) Jim Richards	Jim Richards Racing	(New Zealand) Jim Richards
1	3	(Victoria (state)) Phillip Island		(New Zealand) Jim Richards	(New Zealand) Jim Richards	Jim Richards Racing	(New Zealand) Jim Richards
2	1	(New South Wales) Eastern Creek 1	(Australia) Marcus Marshall	(Australia) Marcus Marshall	(New Zealand) Jim Richards	Jim Richards Racing	(New Zealand) Jim Richards
2	2	(New South Wales) Eastern Creek 1		(New Zealand) Jim Richards	(New Zealand) Jim Richards	Jim Richards Racing	(New Zealand) Jim Richards
2	3	(New South Wales) Eastern Creek 1		(Australia) Marcus Marshall	(New Zealand) Jim Richards	Jim Richards Racing	(New Zealand) Jim Richards
3	1	(Victoria (state)) Winton	(New Zealand) Jim Richards	(Australia) Peter Fitzgerald	(New Zealand) Jim Richards	Jim Richards Racing	(Australia) Marcus Marshall
3	2	(Victoria (state)) Winton		(New Zealand) Jim Richards	(Australia) Marcus Marshall	VIP Petfoods Racing	(Australia) Marcus Marshall
3	3	(Victoria (state)) Winton		(Australia) Tim Leahey	(Australia) Marcus Marshall	VIP Petfoods Racing	(Australia) Marcus Marshall
4	1	(Northern Territory) Darwin	(New Zealand) Jim Richards	(New Zealand) Jim Richards	(New Zealand) Jim Richards	Jim Richards Racing	(Australia) Tim Leahey
4	2	(Northern Territory) Darwin		(New Zealand) Jim Richards	(New Zealand) Jim Richards	Jim Richards Racing	(Australia) Tim Leahey
4	3	(Northern Territory) Darwin		(New Zealand) Jim Richards	(New Zealand) Kevin Bell	International Motorsport	(Australia) Tim Leahey
5	1	Queensland	(New Zealand) Jim Richards	(New Zealand) Jim Richards	(New Zealand) Jim Richards	Jim Richards Racing	(New Zealand) Jim Richards
5	2	Queensland		(Australia) Marcus Marshall	(New Zealand) Jim Richards	Jim Richards Racing	(New Zealand) Jim Richards
5	3	Queensland		(New Zealand) Jim Richards	(New Zealand) Jim Richards	Jim Richards Racing	(New Zealand) Jim Richards
6	1	(Victoria (state)) Sandown	(New Zealand) Jim Richards	(New Zealand) Jim Richards	(Australia) Peter Fitzgerald	Fitzgerald Racing	(New Zealand) Jim Richards
6	2	(Victoria (state)) Sandown		(Australia) Tim Leahey	(New Zealand) Jim Richards	Jim Richards Racing	(New Zealand) Jim Richards
6	3	(Victoria (state)) Sandown		(New Zealand) Jim Richards	(New Zealand) Jim Richards	Jim Richards Racing	(New Zealand) Jim Richards
7	1	(New South Wales) Bathurst	(New Zealand) Jim Richards	(Australia) Peter Fitzgerald	(New Zealand) Jim Richards	Jim Richards Racing	(New Zealand) Jim Richards
7	2	(New South Wales) Bathurst		(Australia) Marcus Marshall	(New Zealand) Jim Richards	Jim Richards Racing	(New Zealand) Jim Richards
7	3	(New South Wales) Bathurst		(New Zealand) Jim Richards	(New Zealand) Jim Richards	Jim Richards Racing	(New Zealand) Jim Richards
8	1	(Queensland) Surfers Paradise	(New Zealand) Jim Richards	(Australia) Peter Fitzgerald	(New Zealand) Jim Richards	Jim Richards Racing	(New Zealand) Jim Richards
8	2	(Queensland) Surfers Paradise		(Australia) Peter Fitzgerald	(New Zealand) Jim Richards	Jim Richards Racing	(New Zealand) Jim Richards
8	3	(Queensland) Surfers Paradise		(New Zealand) Jim Richards	(New Zealand) Jim Richards	Jim Richards Racing	(New Zealand) Jim Richards
9	1	(New South Wales) Eastern Creek 2	(Australia) Tim Leahey	(Australia) Alex Davison	(Australia) Alex Davison	Greg Murphy Racing	(Australia) Alex Davison
9	2	(New South Wales) Eastern Creek 2		(Australia) Alex Davison	(Australia) Alex Davison	Greg Murphy Racing	(Australia) Alex Davison
9	3	(New South Wales) Eastern Creek 2		(New Zealand) Jim Richards	(Australia) Alex Davison	Greg Murphy Racing	(Australia) Alex Davison

== Points system ==
Championship points were awarded at each race on the following basis:

Finishing Position	1st	2nd	3rd	4th	5th	6th	7th	8th	9th	10th	11th	12th	13th	14th	15th	16th	17th	18th	19th	20th	21st – last
Points awarded	60	54	48	42	36	30	27	24	21	18	15	12	9	6	6	3	3	3	3	3	1

== Championship results ==
Pos.	Driver	(Victoria (state)) PHI			(New South Wales) EAS1			(Victoria (state)) WIN			(Northern Territory) HID			(Queensland) QUE			(Victoria (state)) SAN			(New South Wales) BAT			(Queensland) SUR			(New South Wales) EAS2			Pts
Pos.	Driver	R1	R2	R3	R1	R2	R3	R1	R2	R3	R1	R2	R3	R1	R2	R3	R1	R2	R3	R1	R2	R3	R1	R2	R3	R1	R2	R3	Pts
1	(New Zealand) Jim Richards	1	1	1	1	1	1																						1475
2	(Australia) Marcus Marshall	3	3	3	2	2	2																						1194
3	(Australia) Peter Fitzgerald	2	2	2	3	5	4																						1050
4	(Australia) Tim Leahey	4	13	Ret	4	3	3																						780
5	(New Zealand) Kevin Bell	5	4	10	6	6	5																						666
6	(Australia) Matthew Coleman	6	15	11	5	4	Ret																						663
7	(New Zealand) Paul Pedersen	8	5	4	9	8	DNS																						534
8	(Australia) Jonathon Webb	10	7	15	8	9	Ret																						489
9	(United Kingdom) Tony Quinn	9	6	9	10	7	Ret																						471
10	(Australia) Dean Cook	15	16	8	12	13	7																						402*
11	(Australia) Rodney Jane	23	18	13	7	Ret	Ret																						350.5
12	(Australia) Dean Grant	11	8	7	18	17	11																						323.5
13	(Australia) Klark Quinn																												318
14	(Australia) Andrew Miedecke	12	9	6	14	10	8																						318
15	(Australia) James Dutton	22	21	18	17	11	6																						276
16	(Australia) Peter Hill	7	22	14	11	Ret	16																						214*
17	(Australia) Charlie O'Brien																												208.5
18	(Australia) Geoff Morgan	20	11	DNS	Ret	16	10																						187.5
19	(Australia) Alex Davison																												180
20	(Australia) Scott Shearman	14	10	5	15	Ret	18																						177
21	(Australia) Jack Crocker	13	Ret	29	22	15	9																						176.5
22	(Australia) Andrew Taplin	18	12	12	Ret	20	14																						133.5*
23	(Australia) Chris Seidler	Ret	WD	WD	21	19	17																						117.5
24	(Australia) Greg Keene	16	Ret	DNS	24	Ret	15																						116*
25	(Australia) Russell Wright																												75*
26	(Australia) John Teulan	17	14	20	20	18	Ret																						62*
27	(Australia) David Scaysbrook																												57
28	(Australia) Roger Oakeshott	21	17	21																									54.5*
29	(New Zealand) Rick Armstrong				13	12	12																						33
30	(Australia) Paul Blackie	DSQ	19	20	19	14	13																						28
31**	(New Zealand) Andrew Bagnall				16	Ret	19																						22
32**	(Australia) Marc Cini																												21.5
33**	(Australia) Stephen Borness																												20.5*
34	(Australia) Mark Howard	24	20	17																									7
35	(Australia) Rusty French	19	Ret	DNS																									3
36	(Australia) Tim Pritchard				23	Ret	DNS																						1
Pos.	Driver	R1	R2	R3	R1	R2	R3	R1	R2	R3	R1	R2	R3	R1	R2	R3	R1	R2	R3	R1	R2	R3	R1	R2	R3	R1	R2	R3	Pts
Pos.	Driver	(Victoria (state)) PHI			(New South Wales) EAS1			(Victoria (state)) WIN			(Northern Territory) HID			(Queensland) QUE			(Victoria (state)) SAN			(New South Wales) BAT			(Queensland) SUR			(New South Wales) EAS2			Pts

- Note: * indicates points total has been amended due to a minor summation error in the referenced official results.
- Note: ** indicates championship position has been adjusted to fit amended points totals.
