= 2012 Adelaide 500 =

2012 V8 Supercar championship race

(South Australia) 2012 Adelaide 500
Event Information
- Round 1 of 15 in the 2012 International V8 Supercars Championship
- Date: 1–4 March 2012
- Location: Adelaide, South Australia
- Venue: Adelaide Street Circuit
- Weather: Fine

Results
Race 1
Distance	78 laps	250 km
Pole position	Craig Lowndes; Triple Eight Race Engineering	1:21.2738
Winner	Jamie Whincup; Triple Eight Race Engineering	1:56:34.2914
Race 2
Distance	78 laps	250 km
Pole position	Jamie Whincup; Triple Eight Race Engineering	1:20.5353
Winner	Will Davison; Ford Performance Racing	1:48:31.4231

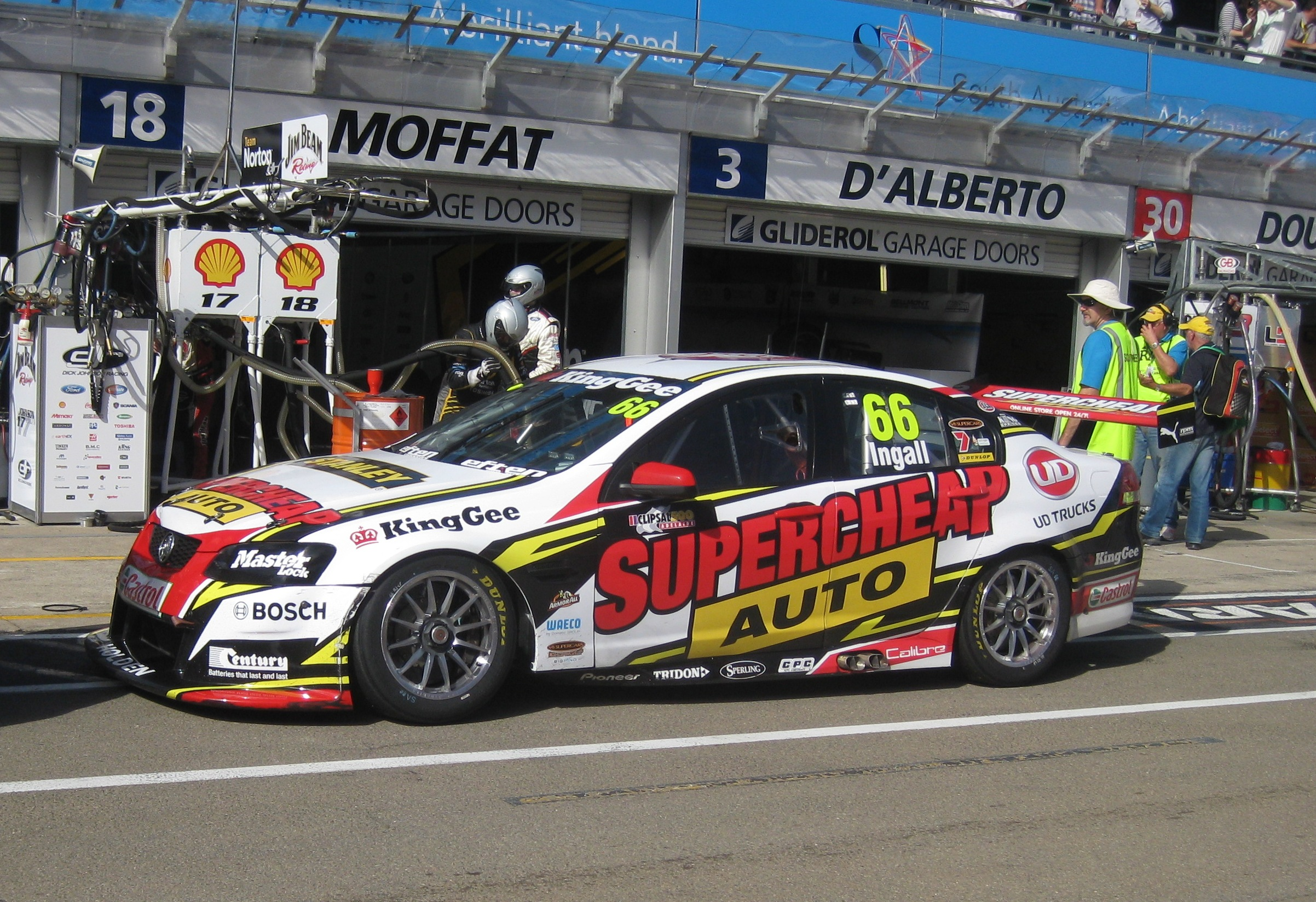
The Holden VE Commodore of Russell Ingall at the 2012 Clipsal 500 Adelaide

The 2012 Adelaide 500, known for naming rights reasons as the 2012 Clipsal 500, was a motor race for the Australian sedan-based V8 Supercars. It was the first event of the 2012 International V8 Supercars Championship, and the fourteenth running of the Clipsal 500. It was held on the weekend of 1–4 March at the Adelaide Street Circuit, in Adelaide, South Australia.

== Report ==
=== Race 1 ===
==== Qualifying ====
Triple Eight Race Engineering driver Craig Lowndes qualified on pole position for the first race — his pole at the Adelaide parklands circuit — ahead of Garth Tander and Will Davison. Lowndes' team-mate and reigning series champion Jamie Whincup qualified fifth, having started on the front row of the grid at every race since 2007.

Pos.	No.	Name	Car	Team	Time
1	888	(Australia) Craig Lowndes	Holden VE Commodore	Triple Eight Race Engineering	1:21.2738
2	2	(Australia) Garth Tander	Holden VE Commodore	Holden Racing Team	1:21.2908
3	6	(Australia) Will Davison	Ford FG Falcon	Ford Performance Racing	1:21.4194
4	19	(Australia) Jonathon Webb	Holden VE Commodore	Tekno Autosports	1:21.5164
5	1	(Australia) Jamie Whincup	Holden VE Commodore	Triple Eight Race Engineering	1:21.5468
6	47	(Australia) Tim Slade	Ford FG Falcon	James Rosenberg Racing	1:21.6288
7	5	(Australia) Mark Winterbottom	Ford FG Falcon	Ford Performance Racing	1:21.7093
8	55	(Australia) David Reynolds	Ford FG Falcon	Rod Nash Racing	1:21.8078
9	14	(New Zealand) Fabian Coulthard	Holden VE Commodore	Brad Jones Racing	1:22.0289
10	9	(New Zealand) Shane van Gisbergen	Ford FG Falcon	Stone Brothers Racing	1:22.3105
11	7	(Australia) Todd Kelly	Holden VE Commodore	Jack Daniel's Racing	1:21.2386
12	3	(Australia) Tony D'Alberto	Ford FG Falcon	Tony D'Alberto Racing	1:21.3746
13	22	(Australia) James Courtney	Holden VE Commodore	Holden Racing Team	1:21.4035
14	15	(Australia) Rick Kelly	Holden VE Commodore	Jack Daniel's Racing	1:21.4148
15	4	(Australia) Lee Holdsworth	Ford FG Falcon	Stone Brothers Racing	1:21.4880
16	34	(Australia) Michael Caruso	Holden VE Commodore	Garry Rogers Motorsport	1:21.4966
17	49	(Australia) Steve Owen	Ford FG Falcon	Paul Morris Motorsport	1:21.5431
18	17	(Australia) Steven Johnson	Ford FG Falcon	Dick Johnson Racing	1:21.5915
19	18	(Australia) James Moffat	Ford FG Falcon	Dick Johnson Racing	1:21.5928
20	66	(Australia) Russell Ingall	Holden VE Commodore	Walkinshaw Racing	1:21.7532
21	51	(New Zealand) Greg Murphy	Holden VE Commodore	Kelly Racing	1:21.7964
22	12	(Australia) Dean Fiore	Ford FG Falcon	Triple F Racing	1:21.9426
23	30	(Australia) Taz Douglas	Holden VE Commodore	Lucas Dumbrell Motorsport	1:22.1907
24	33	(France) Alexandre Prémat	Holden VE Commodore	Garry Rogers Motorsport	1:22.1991
25	21	(Australia) David Wall	Holden VE Commodore	Britek Motorsport	1:22.4358
26	8	(Australia) Jason Bright	Holden VE Commodore	Brad Jones Racing	1:29.3326
—	11	(Australia) Karl Reindler	Holden VE Commodore	Kelly Racing	no time
EX	91	(Australia) Michael Patrizi	Holden VE Commodore	Tekno Autosports	1:21.6802^{1}

Notes
^1 – Michael Patrizi was moved to the back of the grid for ignoring red flags during qualifying.

==== Race ====
Garth Tander took an early lead in the race, but was re-passed by Craig Lowndes after three drivers — James Courtney, Jason Bright and Taz Douglas — crashed heavily at Turn 8. Shortly after the accident Jamie Whincup switched from a two-stop to a three-stop strategy as Will Davison took the lead of the race, leading team-mate Mark Winterbottom. David Reynolds also crashed at Turn 8 just before lap 50, prompting an early round of pit stops and forcing the leaders to enter fuel-saving mode. Whincup used his shorter fuelling window and a brand-new set of tyres to catch the leaders, passing Davison at the hairpin on the final lap when Davison ran out of fuel. Tander finished third after Winterbottom was forced to pit for fuel himself.

Pos.	No.	Name	Car	Team	Laps	Time/retired	Grid
1	1	(Australia) Jamie Whincup	Holden VE Commodore	Triple Eight Race Engineering	78	1:56:34.2914	5
2	6	(Australia) Will Davison	Ford FG Falcon	Ford Performance Racing	78	1:56:39.8163	3
3	2	(Australia) Garth Tander	Holden VE Commodore	Holden Racing Team	78	1:56:55.0784	2
4	888	(Australia) Craig Lowndes	Holden VE Commodore	Triple Eight Race Engineering	78	1:57:13.5690	1
5	4	(Australia) Lee Holdsworth	Ford FG Falcon	Stone Brothers Racing	78	1:57:14.0389	15
6	14	(New Zealand) Fabian Coulthard	Holden VE Commodore	Brad Jones Racing	78	1:57:15.1127	9
7	15	(Australia) Rick Kelly	Holden VE Commodore	Jack Daniel's Racing	78	1:57:16.0684	14
8	7	(Australia) Todd Kelly	Holden VE Commodore	Jack Daniel's Racing	78	1:57:16.8003	11
9	5	(Australia) Mark Winterbottom	Ford FG Falcon	Ford Performance Racing	78	1:57:18.8675	7
10	17	(Australia) Steven Johnson	Ford FG Falcon	Dick Johnson Racing	78	1:57:20.0157	18
11	9	(New Zealand) Shane van Gisbergen	Ford FG Falcon	Stone Brothers Racing	78	1:57:21.3316	10
12	47	(Australia) Tim Slade	Ford FG Falcon	James Rosenberg Racing	78	1:57:22.0020	6
13	66	(Australia) Russell Ingall	Holden VE Commodore	Walkinshaw Racing	78	1:57:26.8003	20
14	91	(Australia) Michael Patrizi	Holden VE Commodore	Tekno Autosports	78	1:57:32.3598	28
15	18	(Australia) James Moffat	Ford FG Falcon	Dick Johnson Racing	78	1:57:34.0494	19
16	12	(Australia) Dean Fiore	Ford FG Falcon	Triple F Racing	78	1:57:38.0943	22
17	33	(France) Alexandre Prémat	Holden VE Commodore	Garry Rogers Motorsport	78	1:57:50.6825	PL^{2}
18	21	(Australia) David Wall	Holden VE Commodore	Britek Motorsport	77	+ 1 Lap	25
19	49	(Australia) Steve Owen	Ford FG Falcon	Paul Morris Motorsport	77	+ 1 Lap	17
20	11	(Australia) Karl Reindler	Holden VE Commodore	Kelly Racing	77	+ 1 Lap	27
21	3	(Australia) Tony D'Alberto	Ford FG Falcon	Tony D'Alberto Racing	77	+ 1 Lap	12
22	34	(Australia) Michael Caruso	Holden VE Commodore	Garry Rogers Motorsport	77	+ 1 Lap	16
23	19	(Australia) Jonathon Webb	Holden VE Commodore	Tekno Autosports	76	+ 2 Laps	4
24	51	(New Zealand) Greg Murphy	Holden VE Commodore	Kelly Racing	67	+ 11 Laps	21
Ret	55	(Australia) David Reynolds	Ford FG Falcon	Rod Nash Racing	44	Accident	8
Ret	22	(Australia) James Courtney	Holden VE Commodore	Holden Racing Team	4	Accident	13
Ret	30	(Australia) Taz Douglas	Holden VE Commodore	Lucas Dumbrell Motorsport	4	Accident	23
Ret	8	(Australia) Jason Bright	Holden VE Commodore	Brad Jones Racing	4	Accident	PL^{2}

Notes

- ^2 — Alexandre Prémat and Jason Bright started the race from pit lane.

=== Race 2 ===
==== Qualifying ====
After missing pole position for Race 1, Jamie Whincup claimed his first pole of the season, beating Garth Tander by one-tenth of a second. The twenty-minute qualifying session saw a heavy collision between Greg Murphy and Jonathon Webb when Webb slowed on the approach to the final corner, attempting to create a window of clean air for a flying lap. Murphy, already on a flying lap himself, came around the penultimate corner at speed and was unable to move aside in time, rear-ending Webb's car. The accident was heavy enough to remove both cars out of the race.

Pos.	No.	Name	Car	Team	Time
1	1	(Australia) Jamie Whincup	Holden VE Commodore	Triple Eight Race Engineering	1:20.5353
2	2	(Australia) Garth Tander	Holden VE Commodore	Holden Racing Team	1:20.6395
3	5	(Australia) Mark Winterbottom	Ford FG Falcon	Ford Performance Racing	1:20.6436
4	888	(Australia) Craig Lowndes	Holden VE Commodore	Triple Eight Race Engineering	1:20.8034
5	15	(Australia) Rick Kelly	Holden VE Commodore	Jack Daniel's Racing	1:20.8160
6	6	(Australia) Will Davison	Ford FG Falcon	Ford Performance Racing	1:20.9112
7	4	(Australia) Lee Holdsworth	Ford FG Falcon	Stone Brothers Racing	1:20.9115
8	47	(Australia) Tim Slade	Ford FG Falcon	James Rosenberg Racing	1:20.9172
9	9	(New Zealand) Shane van Gisbergen	Ford FG Falcon	Stone Brothers Racing	1:20.9816
10	34	(Australia) Michael Caruso	Holden VE Commodore	Garry Rogers Motorsport	1:20.9816
11	55	(Australia) David Reynolds	Ford FG Falcon	Rod Nash Racing	1:21.1962
12	15	(Australia) Todd Kelly	Holden VE Commodore	Jack Daniel's Racing	1:21.3300
13	3	(Australia) Tony D'Alberto	Ford FG Falcon	Tony D'Alberto Racing	1:21.3329
14	14	(New Zealand) Fabian Coulthard	Holden VE Commodore	Brad Jones Racing	1:21.4095
15	8	(Australia) Jason Bright	Holden VE Commodore	Brad Jones Racing	1:21.4880
16	17	(Australia) Steven Johnson	Ford FG Falcon	Dick Johnson Racing	1:21.4408
17	91	(Australia) Michael Patrizi	Holden VE Commodore	Tekno Autosports	1:21.5278
18	49	(Australia) Steve Owen	Ford FG Falcon	Paul Morris Motorsport	1:21.5429
19	12	(Australia) Dean Fiore	Ford FG Falcon	Triple F Racing	1:21.6351
20	18	(Australia) James Moffat	Ford FG Falcon	Dick Johnson Racing	1:21.6741
21	66	(Australia) Russell Ingall	Holden VE Commodore	Walkinshaw Racing	1:21.7964
22	33	(France) Alexandre Prémat	Holden VE Commodore	Garry Rogers Motorsport	1:21.8156
23	19	(Australia) Jonathon Webb	Holden VE Commodore	Tekno Autosports	1:22.0638
24	30	(Australia) Taz Douglas	Holden VE Commodore	Lucas Dumbrell Motorsport	1:22.0928
25	11	(Australia) Karl Reindler	Holden VE Commodore	Kelly Racing	1:22.3120
26	21	(Australia) David Wall	Holden VE Commodore	Britek Motorsport	1:22.4150
27	51	(New Zealand) Greg Murphy	Holden VE Commodore	Kelly Racing	6:38.1826
—	22	(Australia) James Courtney	Holden VE Commodore	Holden Racing Team	no time^{3}

Notes
^3 – James Courtney failed to set a lap time after damaging his gearbox.

==== Race ====
Garth Tander lead the race away once again, but was caught and passed by Jamie Whincup before the first round of stops, and then the Fords of Will Davison and Mark Winterbottom after the stops. Whincup's car was reported to develop a misfire and was soon caught by Davison and Winterbottom, who also went on to pass Tander. The race was uninterrupted by safety cars, and Davison and Winterbottom went on to claim a one-two finish for Ford Performance Racing.

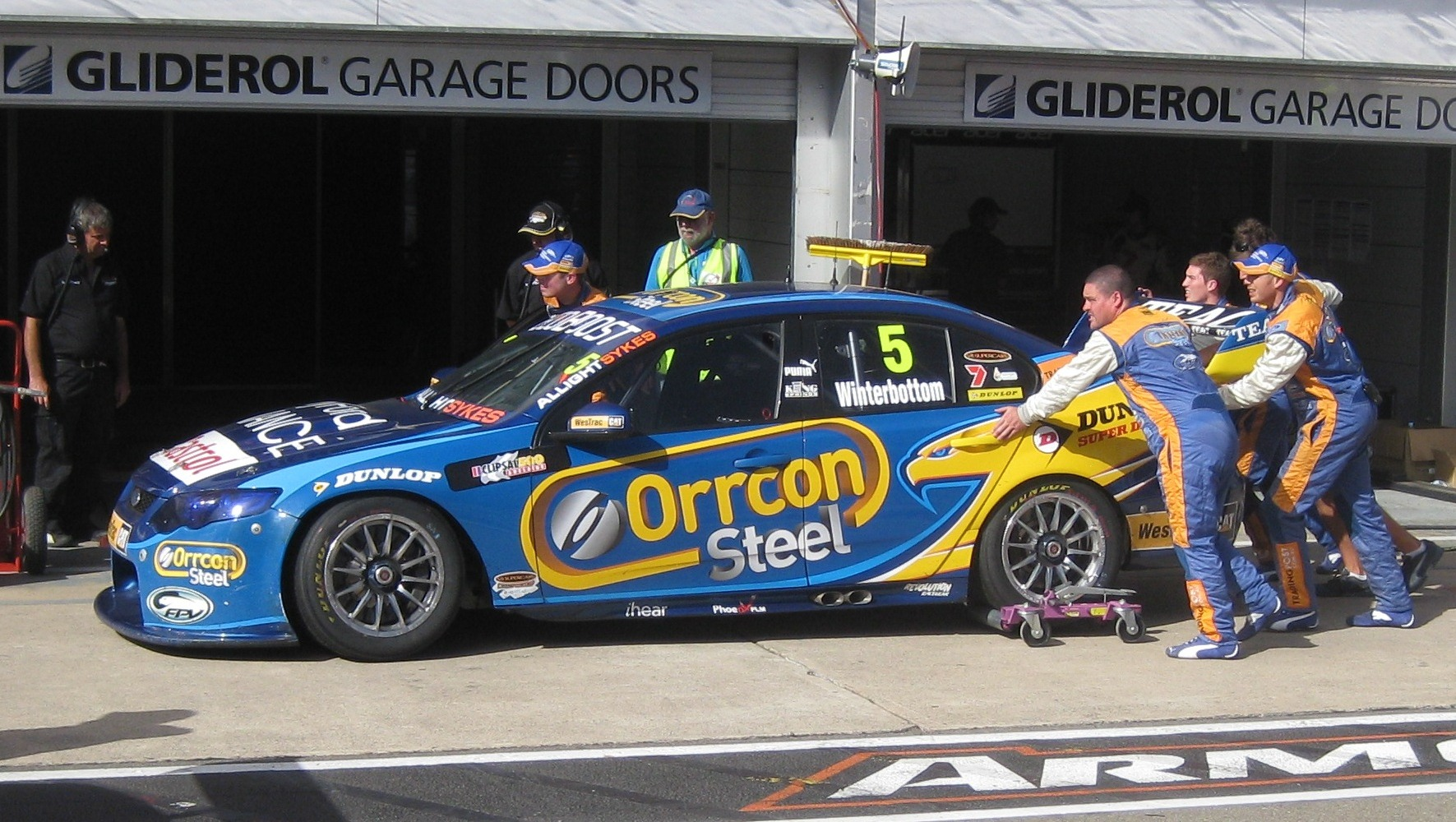
Mark Winterbottom placed 2nd in the 2012 Clipsal 500 Adelaide

Pos.	No.	Name	Car	Team	Laps	Time/retired	Grid
1	6	(Australia) Will Davison	Ford FG Falcon	Ford Performance Racing	78	1:48:31.4231	6
2	5	(Australia) Mark Winterbottom	Ford FG Falcon	Ford Performance Racing	78	1:48:36.2684	3
3	2	(Australia) Garth Tander	Holden VE Commodore	Holden Racing Team	78	1:48:40.5133	2
4	1	(Australia) Jamie Whincup	Holden VE Commodore	Triple Eight Race Engineering	78	1:48:52.5977	1
5	888	(Australia) Craig Lowndes	Holden VE Commodore	Triple Eight Race Engineering	78	1:48:57.7579	4
6	9	(New Zealand) Shane van Gisbergen	Ford FG Falcon	Stone Brothers Racing	78	1:48:58.9003	9
7	55	(Australia) David Reynolds	Ford FG Falcon	Rod Nash Racing	78	1:49:11.2822	11
8	4	(Australia) Lee Holdsworth	Ford FG Falcon	Stone Brothers Racing	78	1:49:15.7393	7
9	14	(New Zealand) Fabian Coulthard	Holden VE Commodore	Brad Jones Racing	78	1:57:16.8003	11
10	47	(Australia) Tim Slade	Ford FG Falcon	Stone Brothers Racing	78	1:49:25.8270	8
11	15	(Australia) Rick Kelly	Holden VE Commodore	Jack Daniel's Racing	78	1:49:26.2042	5
12	3	(Australia) Tony D'Alberto	Ford FG Falcon	Tony D'Alberto Racing	78	1:49:36.7330	13
13	66	(Australia) Russell Ingall	Holden VE Commodore	Walkinshaw Racing	78	1:49:51.2999	21
14	49	(Australia) Steve Owen	Ford FG Falcon	Paul Morris Motorsport	77	+1 Lap	18
15	91	(Australia) Michael Patrizi	Holden VE Commodore	Tekno Autosports	77	+1 Lap	17
16	8	(Australia) Jason Bright	Holden VE Commodore	Brad Jones Racing	77	+1 Lap	15
17	17	(Australia) Steven Johnson	Ford FG Falcon	Dick Johnson Racing	77	+1 Lap	16
18	33	(France) Alexandre Prémat	Holden VE Commodore	Garry Rogers Motorsport	77	+1 Lap	22
19	12	(Australia) Dean Fiore	Ford FG Falcon	Triple F Racing	77	+1 Lap	19
20	11	(Australia) Karl Reindler	Holden VE Commodore	Kelly Racing	77	+1 Lap	24
21	21	(Australia) David Wall	Holden VE Commodore	Britek Motorsport	77	+1 Lap	25
22	34	(Australia) Michael Caruso	Holden VE Commodore	Garry Rogers Motorsport	77	+1 Lap	10
23	7	(Australia) Todd Kelly	Holden VE Commodore	Jack Daniel's Racing	77	+1 Lap	12
24	30	(Australia) Taz Douglas	Holden VE Commodore	Lucas Dumbrell Motorsport	76	+2 Laps	4
25	22	(Australia) James Courtney	Holden VE Commodore	Holden Racing Team	65	+13 Laps	PL^{5}
Ret	18	(Australia) James Moffat	Ford FG Falcon	Dick Johnson Racing	16	Power steering	20
DNS	19	(Australia) Jonathon Webb	Holden VE Commodore	Tekno Autosports	0	Collision	-
DNS	51	(New Zealand) Greg Murphy	Holden VE Commodore	Kelly Racing	0	Collision	-

Notes

- ^5 — James Courtney started the race from pit lane.

== Standings ==
- After 2 of 30 races.

Pos	No	Name	Team	Points
1	6	Will Davison	Ford Performance Racing	288
2	1	Jamie Whincup	Triple Eight Race Engineering	270
3	2	Garth Tander	Holden Racing Team	258
4	5	Mark Winterbottom	Ford Performance Racing	222
5	888	Craig Lowndes	Triple Eight Race Engineering	206
