= David Wall (racing driver) =

Australian racing driver

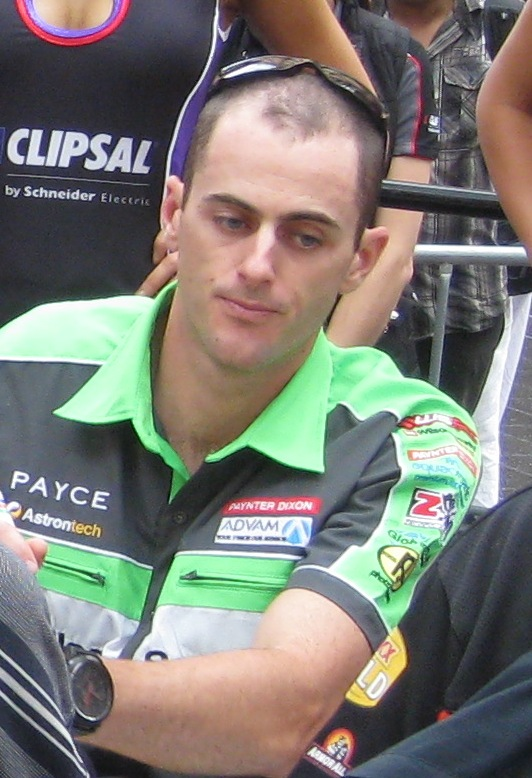
- Wall in 2013
- Nationality: Australian
- Born: 19 January 1983 (age 43) Sydney, New South Wales

Supercars Championship career
- Current team: Brad Jones Racing (Endurance race co-driver)
- Championships: 0
- Races: 151
- Wins: 0
- Podiums: 2
- Pole positions: 0

David Wall (born 19 January 1983) is an Australian racing driver competing in the Porsche Carrera Cup Australia Championship. He currently drives the No. 38 Porsche 911 GT3 Cup for Wall Racing.

== Biography ==
As the son of long-time Sports Sedan racer and 2009 Kerrick Sports Sedan Series winner Des Wall, he started in sedan cars rather the conventional formula cars.

Wall's mainstay has been sports car racing, particularly Porsches. He has won the Australian GT Championship twice in 2009 and 2010 driving a Porsche 911 GT3 Cup S Type 997 as well as competed in the Australian Carrera Cup Championship. He has also won the Australian Tourist Trophy in 2009 and 2010.

Wall has also competed in Production Cars finishing third in Class A of the Bathurst 12 Hour race in 2008.

In 2009, Wall followed his father into V8 Supercars competing in the long-distance races and in 2011 doing a full season in the Fujitsu V8 Supercar Series. His first preference was to join the series full-time in 2012 and this was accommodated by Brad Jones Racing by signing Wall for the full 2012 season with backing from Wilson Security.

Wall contested the 2014 V8 Supercars Championship in a Dick Johnson Racing entered Ford Falcon (FG). In 2015 Wall joined Garry Rogers Motorsport, replacing Robert Dahlgren. It marked Wall's third team in four seasons of V8 Supercars racing.

In 2016, Wall drove for GRM as a co-driver alongside Scott McLaughlin in the Pirtek Enduro Cup, before moving to Nissan Motorsport to co-drive with Rick Kelly in the No. 15 Nissan Altima.

== Career results ==
Season	Series	Position	Car	Team
2005	Tranzam Sports Sedan Series	10th	Toyota Supra - Chevrolet	Wall Racing
2006	Australian GT Championship	6th	Porsche 911 GT3 RSR Type 996	Wall Racing
2006	Australian Carrera Cup Championship	7th	Porsche 911 GT3 Cup Type 997	Paul Cruickshank Racing
2007	Australian GT Championship	3rd	Porsche 911 GT3 RSR Type 996	Wall Racing
2007	Australian Carrera Cup Championship	7th	Porsche 911 GT3 Cup Type 997	Wall Racing
2008	Australian Carrera Cup Championship	7th	Porsche 911 GT3 Cup Type 997	Jim Richards Racing
2009	Australian GT Championship	1st	Porsche 911 GT3 Cup S Type 997	Wall Racing
2009	Australian Tourist Trophy	1st	Porsche 911 GT3 Cup S Type 997	Wall Racing
2009	V8 Supercar Championship Series	45th	Ford Falcon (BF)	Paul Cruickshank Racing
2010	Australian GT Championship	1st	Porsche 911 GT3 Cup S Type 997	Wall Racing
2010	Australian Tourist Trophy	1st	Porsche 911 GT3 Cup S Type 997	Wall Racing
2010	V8 Supercar Championship Series	48th	Holden Commodore (VE)	Brad Jones Racing
2010	Australian Production Car Championship	55th	Mitsubishi Lancer Evo IX	Easts Holiday Parks
2011	Australian GT Championship	18th	Porsche 911 GT3 Cup S Type 997	Wall Racing
2011	Fujitsu V8 Supercar Series	11th	Holden Commodore (VE)	Tony D'Alberto Racing
2011	International V8 Supercars Championship	57th	Holden Commodore (VE)	Brad Jones Racing
2011	Australian Production Car Championship	50th	Mitsubishi Lancer Evo IX	Easts Holiday Parks
2012	International V8 Supercars Championship	25th	Holden Commodore (VE)	Britek Motorsport
2013	International V8 Supercars Championship	21st	Holden Commodore (VF)	Britek Motorsport
2014	International V8 Supercars Championship	21st	Ford Falcon (FG)	Dick Johnson Racing
2015	International V8 Supercars Championship	23rd	Volvo S60	Garry Rogers Motorsport
2016	Porsche Carrera Cup Australia Championship	4th	Porsche 911 GT3 Cup	Wall Racing
2016	International V8 Supercars Championship	29th	Volvo S60	Garry Rogers Motorsport
2017	Porsche Carrera Cup Australia Championship	1st	Porsche 911 GT3 Cup	Wall Racing
2017	Virgin Australia Supercars Championship	41st	Nissan Altima L33	Nissan Motorsport

=== Super2 Series results ===
Super2 Series results
Year	Team	No.	Car	1	2	3	4	5	6	7	8	9	10	11	12	13	14	15	16	17	Position	Points
2011	Tony D'Alberto Racing	83	Holden VE Commodore	ADE; R1; 13	ADE; R2; 7	BAR; R3; 15	BAR; R4; 11	TOW; R5	TOW; R6	TOW; R7	QLD; R8; 8	QLD; R9; 8	QLD; R10; 9	BAT; R11; 8	BAT; R12; Ret	SAN; R13; 8	SAN; R14; Ret	SAN; R15; DNS	SYD; R16; 11	SYD; R17; 18	11th	754

=== Supercars Championship results ===
Supercars results
Year	Team	No.	Car	1	2	3	4	5	6	7	8	9	10	11	12	13	14	15	16	17	18	19	20	21	22	23	24	25	26	27	28	29	30	31	32	33	34	35	36	37	38	39	Position	Points
2009	Paul Cruickshank Racing	333	Ford BF Falcon	ADE; R1	ADE; R2	HAM; R3	HAM; R4	WIN; R5	WIN; R6	SYM; R7	SYM; R8	HDV; R9	HDV; R10	TOW; R11	TOW; R12	SAN; R13	SAN; R14	QLD; R15	QLD; R16	PHI; Q 17	PHI; R17; 19	BAT; R18; 18	SUR; R19	SUR; R20	SUR; R21	SUR; R22	PHI; R23	PHI; R24	BAR; R25	BAR; R26	SYD; R27	SYD; R28											45th	192
2010	Britek Motorsport	21	Holden VE Commodore	YMC; R1	YMC; R2	BHR; R3	BHR; R4	ADE; R5	ADE; R6	HAM; R7	HAM; R8	QLD; R9	QLD; R10	WIN; R11	WIN; R12	HDV; R13	HDV; R14	TOW; R15	TOW; R16	PHI; Q 17	PHI; R17; 17	BAT; R18; 15	SUR; R19	SUR; R20	SYM; R21	SYM; R22	SAN; R23	SAN; R24	SYD; R25	SYD; R26													48th	217
2011	Britek Motorsport	21	Holden VE Commodore	YMC; R1	YMC; R2	ADE; R3	ADE; R4	HAM; R5	HAM; R6	BAR; R7	BAR; R8	BAR; R9	WIN; R10	WIN; R11	HID; R12	HID; R13	TOW; R14	TOW; R15	QLD; R16	QLD; R17	QLD; R18	PHI; Q 11	PHI; R19; 28	BAT; R20; 14	SUR; R21	SUR; R22	SYM; R23	SYM; R24	SAN; R25	SAN; R26	SYD; R27	SYD; R28											57th	185
2012	Britek Motorsport	21	Holden VE Commodore	ADE; R1; 18	ADE; R2; 21	SYM; R3; Ret	SYM; R4; 23	HAM; R5; 21	HAM; R6; 23	BAR; R7; 22	BAR; R8; 25	BAR; R9; Ret	PHI; R10; 14	PHI; R11; Ret	HID; R12; 20	HID; R13; Ret	TOW; R14; 20	TOW; R15; 19	QLD; R16; 21	QLD; R17; 18	SMP; R18; 18	SMP; R19; 28	SAN; Q 20	SAN; R20; 22	BAT; R21; 14	SUR; R22; 15	SUR; R23; 15	YMC; R24; 22	YMC; R25; 28	YMC; R26; 23	WIN; R27; 17	WIN; R28; 25	SYD; R29; 20	SYD; R30; Ret									25th	1142
2013	Britek Motorsport	21	Holden VF Commodore	ADE; R1; 16	ADE; R2; 16	SYM; R3; 11	SYM; R4; Ret	SYM; R5; 19	PUK; R6; 21	PUK; R7; 17	PUK; R8; 19	PUK; R9; 19	BAR; R10; 22	BAR; R11; 24	BAR; R12; Ret	COA; R13; 10	COA; R14; Ret	COA; R15; 19	COA; R16; 12	HID; R17; 19	HID; R18; 14	HID; R19; Ret	TOW; R20; 21	TOW; R21; 25	QLD; R22; 18	QLD; R23; 16	QLD; R24; 24	WIN; R25; 23	WIN; R26; 10	WIN; R27; 18	SAN; QR; 18	SAN; R28; 19	BAT; R29; 22	SUR; R30; 7	SUR; R31; 12	PHI; R32; 11	PHI; R33; 14	PHI; R34; 17	SYD; R35; 16	SYD; R36; 22			21st	1346
2014	Dick Johnson Racing	17	Ford FG Falcon	ADE; R1; 14	ADE; R2; Ret	ADE; R3; 8	SYM; R4; 12	SYM; R5; 20	SYM; R6; 13	WIN; R7; 13	WIN; R8; 5	WIN; R9; 22	PUK; R10; Ret	PUK; R11; DNS	PUK; R12; DNS	PUK; R13; DNS	BAR; R14; 14	BAR; R15; 13	BAR; R16; 7	HID; R17; 18	HID; R18; 16	HID; R19; 18	TOW; R20; 16	TOW; R21; 13	TOW; R22; 20	QLD; R23; 19	QLD; R24; 20	QLD; R25; 12	SMP; R26; 18	SMP; R27; 14	SMP; R28; 12	SAN; QR; 23	SAN; R29; 16	BAT; R30; Ret	SUR; R31; 16	SUR; R32; 15	PHI; R33; 17	PHI; R34; 19	PHI; R35; Ret	SYD; R36; 7	SYD; R37; Ret	SYD; R38; 22	21st	1349
2015	Garry Rogers Motorsport	34	Volvo S60	ADE; R1; 17	ADE; R2; 15	ADE; R3; 16	SYM; R4; 20	SYM; R5; 20	SYM; R6; Ret	BAR; R7; 23	BAR; R8; 22	BAR; R9; 21	WIN; R10; 21	WIN; R11; 19	WIN; R12; 18	HID; R13; 15	HID; R14; 17	HID; R15; 20	TOW; R16; 18	TOW; R17; 22	QLD; R18; 22	QLD; R19; 19	QLD; R20; 20	SMP; R21; 22	SMP; R22; 20	SMP; R23; 23	SAN; QR; 18	SAN; R24; 21	BAT; R25; Ret	SUR; R26; 16	SUR; R27; Ret	PUK; R28; 18	PUK; R29; 22	PUK; R30; 20	PHI; R31; 23	PHI; R32; 23	PHI; R33; 15	SYD; R34; 19	SYD; R35; 19	SYD; R36; 17			23rd	1118
2016	Garry Rogers Motorsport	33	Volvo S60	ADE; R1	ADE; R2	ADE; R3	SYM; R4	SYM; R5	PHI; R6	PHI; R7	BAR; R8	BAR; R9	WIN; R10; PO	WIN; R11; PO	HID; R12	HID; R13	TOW; R14	TOW; R15	QLD; R16; PO	QLD; R17; PO	SMP; R18	SMP; R19	SAN; QR; 6	SAN; R20; 4	BAT; R21; 15	SUR; R22; 2	SUR; R23; 3	PUK; R24	PUK; R25	PUK; R26	PUK; R27	SYD; R28	SYD; R29										29th	602
2017	Nissan Motorsport	15	Nissan Altima L33	ADE; R1	ADE; R2	SYM; R3	SYM; R4	PHI; R5	PHI; R6	BAR; R7	BAR; R8	WIN; R9; PO	WIN; R10; PO	HID; R11	HID; R12	TOW; R13	TOW; R14	QLD; R15; PO	QLD; R16; PO	SMP; R17	SMP; R18	SAN; Q 13	SAN; R19; 14	BAT; R20; 13	SUR; R21; 10	SUR; R22; 11	PUK; R23	PUK; R24	NEW; R25	NEW; R26													41st	479
2021	Brad Jones Racing	4	Holden Commodore ZB	BAT1; R1	BAT1; R2	SAN; R3	SAN; R4	SAN; R5	SYM; R6	SYM; R7	SYM; R8	BEN; R9	BEN; R10	BEN; R11	HID; R12	HID; R13	HID; R14	TOW1; R15	TOW1; R16	TOW2; R17	TOW2; R18	TOW2; R19	SMP1; R20	SMP1; R21	SMP1; R22	SMP2; R23	SMP2; R24	SMP2; R25	SMP3; R26	SMP3; R27	SMP3; R28	SMP4; R29	SMP4; R30	BAT2; R31; 17									41st	108

=== Complete Bathurst 1000 results ===
Year	Team	Car	Co-driver	Position	Laps
2009	Paul Cruickshank Racing	Ford Falcon (FG)	(Australia) Leanne Tander	18th	160
2010	Britek Motorsport	Holden Commodore (VE)	(Australia) Karl Reindler	15th	161
2011	Britek Motorsport	Holden Commodore (VE)	(Australia) Karl Reindler	14th	161
2012	Britek Motorsport	Holden Commodore (VE)	(New Zealand) Chris Pither	14th	161
2013	Britek Motorsport	Holden Commodore (VF)	(New Zealand) Chris Pither	22nd	156
2014	Dick Johnson Racing	Ford Falcon (FG)	(Australia) Steven Johnson	DNF	64
2015	Garry Rogers Motorsport	Volvo S60	(New Zealand) Chris Pither	DNF	15
2016	Garry Rogers Motorsport	Volvo S60	(New Zealand) Scott McLaughlin	15th	159
2017	Nissan Motorsport	Nissan Altima L33	(Australia) Rick Kelly	13th	159
2021	Brad Jones Racing	Holden Commodore ZB	(Australia) Jack Smith	17th	161

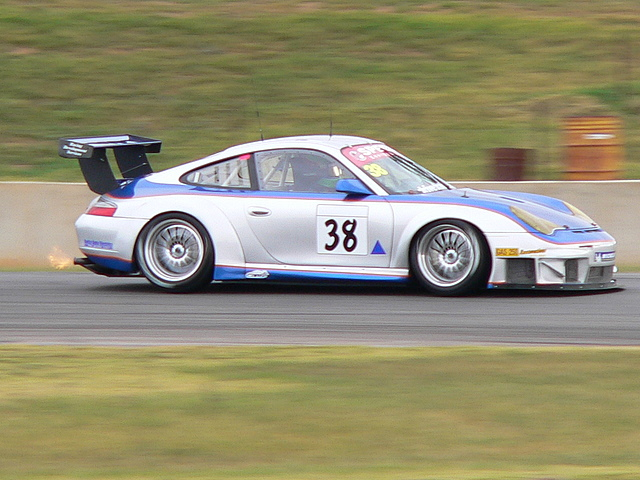
David Wall (Porsche 911 GT3 RSR Type 996) contesting the Mallala round of the 2006 Australian GT Championship

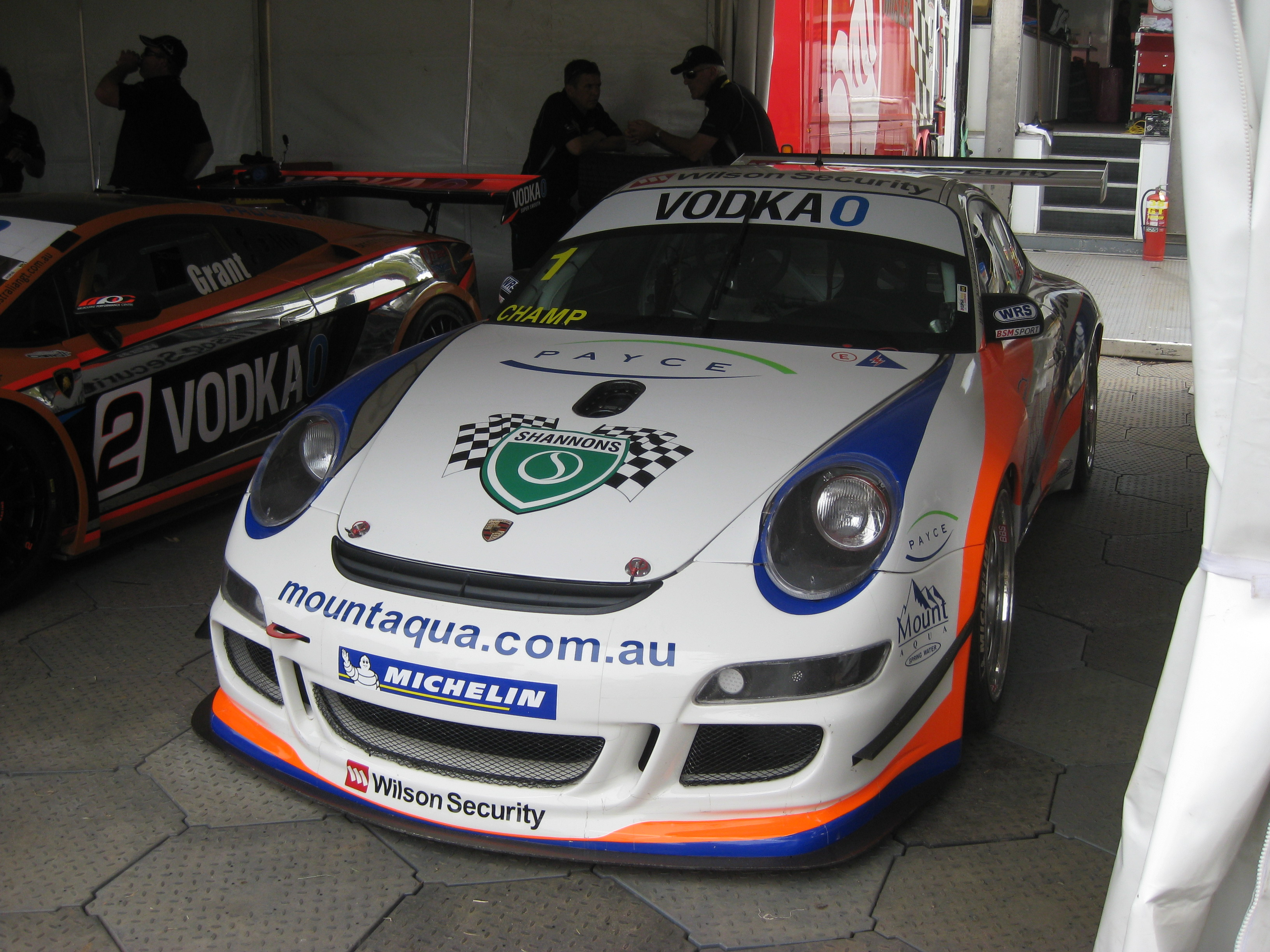
The Porsche 911 GT3 Cup Type 997 of David Wall at the opening round of the 2010 Australian GT Championship

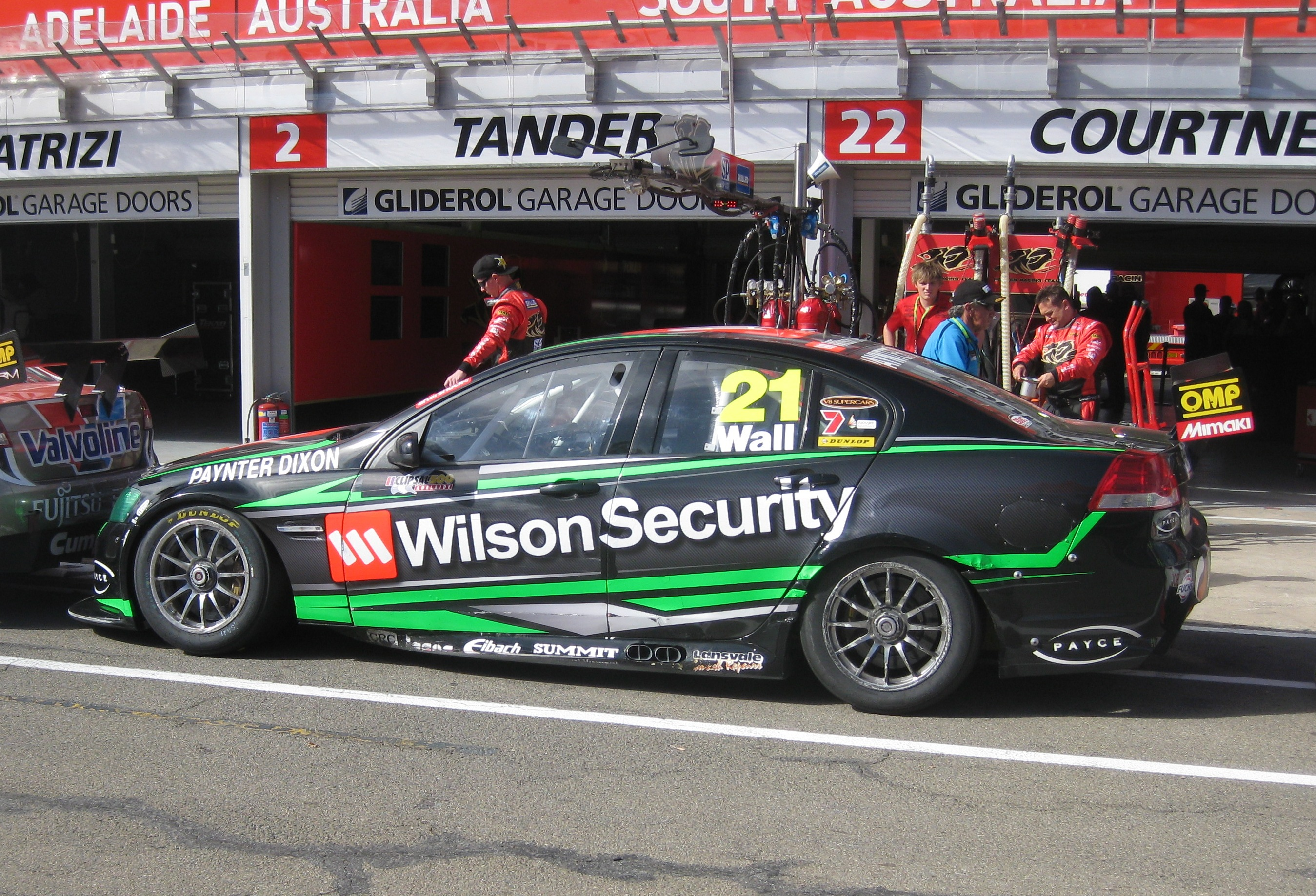
The Holden Commodore (VE) of David Wall at the 2012 Clipsal 500 Adelaide

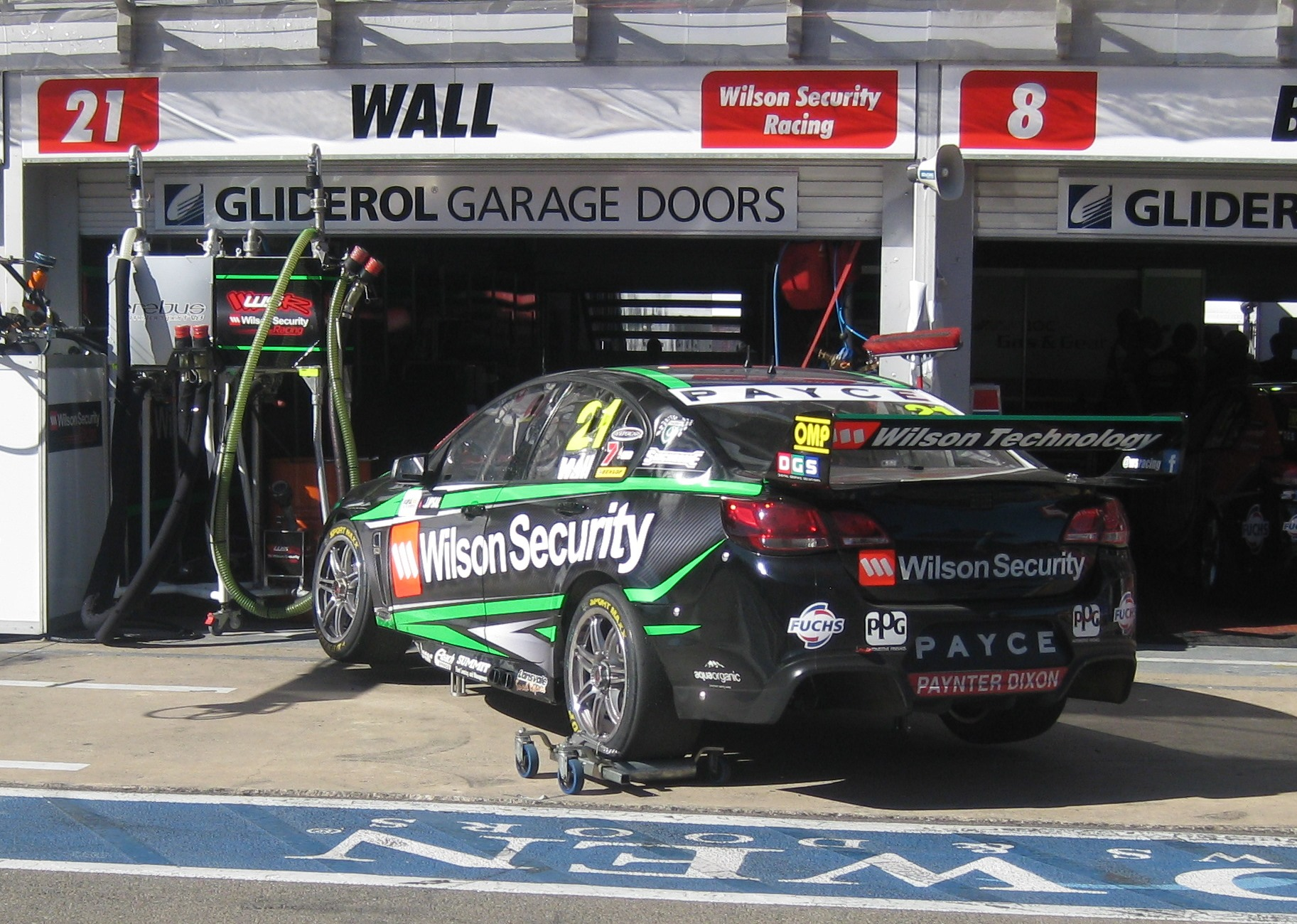
The Holden Commodore (VF) of David Wall at the 2013 Clipsal 500 Adelaide

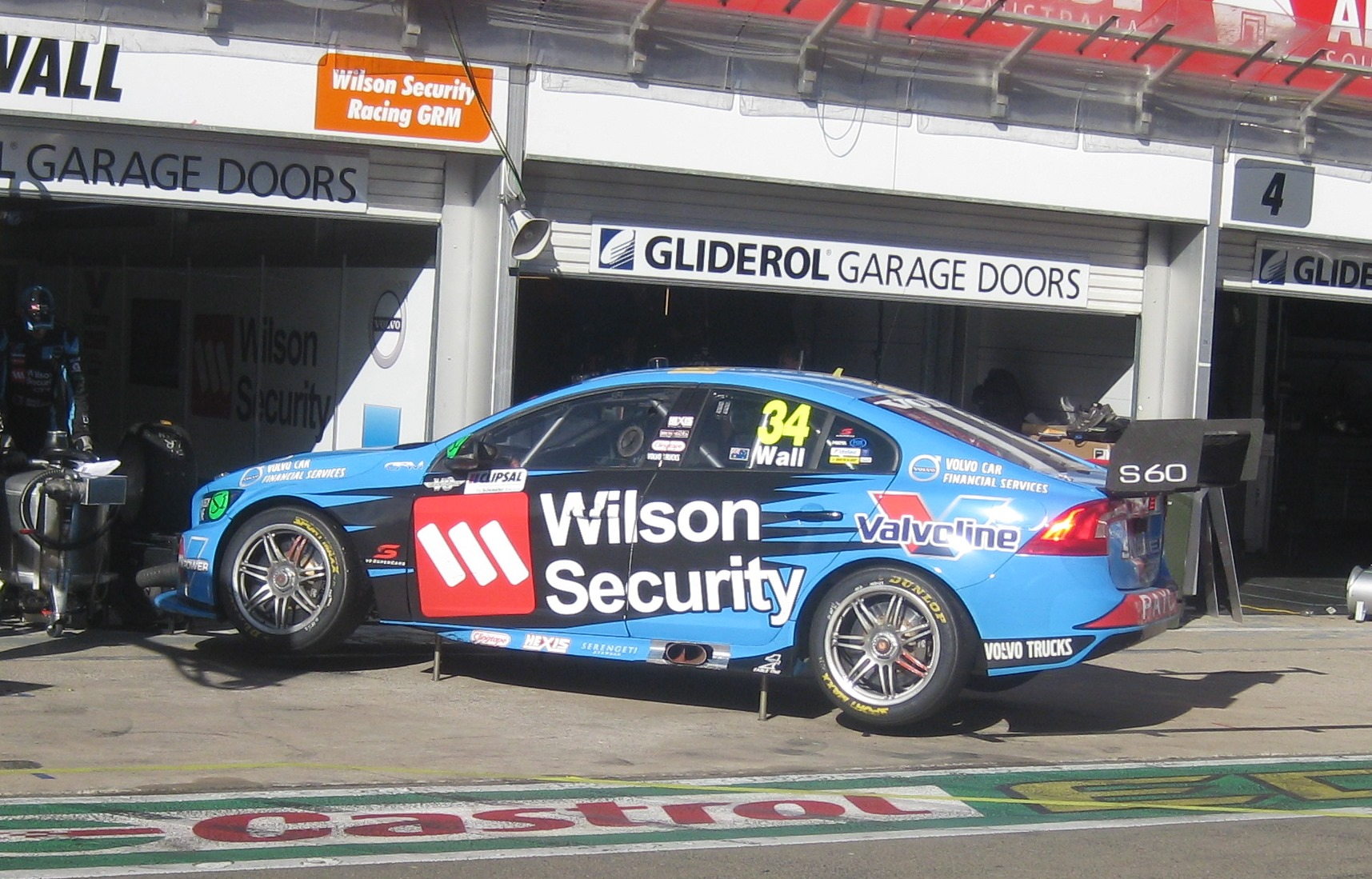
The Volvo S60 of David Wall at the 2015 Clipsal 500 Adelaide

Sporting positions
Preceded by Mark Eddy	Australian GT; Champion; 2009 and 2010	Succeeded by Mark Eddy
Preceded by Matt Campbell	Porsche Carrera Cup Australia; Champion; 2017	Succeeded by Jaxon Evans
