= 2008 Australian GT Championship =

Motor racing competition

Seasons
- ← 2007 2009 →

The 2008 Australian GT Championship was a CAMS sanctioned Australian motor racing competition for closed, production based sports cars which were either approved by the FIA for GT3 competition or approved by CAMS as Australian GT cars. It was the 12th Australian GT Championship to be awarded by CAMS. The Australian GT Sportscar Group Pty Ltd was recognised by CAMS as the Category Manager and Administrator for the 2008 championship.

The championship was won by Mark Eddy driving a Lamborghini Gallardo.

== Teams and drivers ==
The following drivers competed in the 2008 Australian GT Championship.

Team	Manufacturer	Car model	No	Driver
Maranello Motorsport	Ferrari	F430 GT3	1	(Denmark) Allan Simonsen (Australia) John Bowe (Australia) Nick O'Halloran
Maranello Motorsport	Ferrari	F430 GT3	80	(Australia) Nick O'Halloran
Property Solutions Group	Ferrari	F430 Challenge	2	(Australia) Kevin Miller
Taplin Real Estate; ANZ Banking	Lamborghini; Porsche	Gallardo; 996 GT3 Cup	2	(Australia) Dean Grant (Australia) Andrew Taplin
Taplin Real Estate; ANZ Banking	Lamborghini; Porsche	Gallardo; 996 GT3 Cup	11	(Australia) Dean Grant (Australia) Andrew Taplin
Dupont	Dodge	Viper GTS ACR	3	(Australia) D'arcy Russell
Koala Furniture International	Dodge; Lamborghini	Viper GTS ACR; Gallardo	3	(Australia) Ross Lilley (Australia) Greg Crick
Koala Furniture International	Dodge; Lamborghini	Viper GTS ACR; Gallardo	57	(Australia) Ross Lilley (Australia) Greg Crick
Consolidated Chemical Company	Ferrari; Lamborghini	360 GT; Gallardo	4	(New Zealand) Craig Baird (Australia) Ted Hughlin (Australia) John Bowe
Superplus Racing	Porsche	996 GT3 Cup	5	(Australia) Simon Froude
Team Aston Martin; Abcor; Preston General Engineering	Aston Martin	DBRS9	7	(Australia) John Kaias (Australia) Peter Hackett
Team Aston Martin; Abcor; Preston General Engineering	Aston Martin	DBRS9	59	(Australia) John Kaias
VIP Petfoods	Aston Martin	DBRS9	7	(United Kingdom) Tony Quinn
Flash Air; Daikin Air Conditioninh	Porsche	996 GT3 RSR	8	(Australia) Simon Middleton
Hallmarc Developments	Porsche	996 GT3 Cup	9	(Australia) Michael Loccisano (Australia) Marc Cini
Glenelg East Day/Night Pharmacy	Porsche	996 GT3 Cup	10	(Australia) Mark Krashos
SMS Commander	Lotus	Exige S	10	(Australia) Mark O'Connor
allaboutjesus.com	Lamborghini	Gallardo	12	(Australia) Mark Eddy
Echo Ridges Wines	Porsche	996 GT3 Cup	14	(Australia) Greg Ward Jr.
Trueloc	Porsche	996 GT3 Cup	18	(Australia) Max Twigg
Roock	Porsche	996 GT3 Cup	19	(Australia) Ash Samadhi
allaboutjesus.com	Ferrari	F430 GT3	21	(United Kingdom) Hector Lester
Bruce Lynton BMW	BMW	M3	23	(Australia) Beric Lynton
Rod Wilson	Maserati	Trofeo Light	27	(Italy) Ivan Capelli
Rod Wilson	Maserati	Trofeo Light	28	(Australia) Rod Wilson
Rod Wilson	Maserati	Trofeo Light	29	(Australia) Jim Manolios
Warrin Mining	Porsche	996 GT3 Cup	30	(Australia) Adam Wallis
Cooks Construction	Porsche	996 GT3 Cup	31	(Australia) Jon Trende
Kirrapak Sheetmetal	Lotus	Elise Motorsport 200	31	(Australia) Scott Bargwanna (Australia) David Mackie
Kirchner Constructions	Porsche	996 GT3 Cup	33	(Australia) Fraser Kirchner
Ultra Finish; Jaylec	Porsche	996 GT3 Cup	36	(Australia) Peter Fountas (Australia) Ray Angus
RDS Wall Racing; World of Learning	Porsche	996 GT3 RSR	38	(Australia) Des Wall
Brennan Voice Data & IT	Ferrari	F430 Challenge	43	(Australia) David Stevens
Kwikmit; IMAK	Lotus	Exige S	51	(Australia) Andrew MacPherson (Australia) Peter Lucas
Industrie	Ferrari	360 Challenge	53	(Australia) Nick Kelly
Report Factory	Lotus	Exige S	55	(Australia) Garth Walden
Drivebathurst.com	Porsche	996 Clubsport	58	(Australia) Richard Kimber
Jocaro Motors	Porsche	996 GT3 Cup	66	(Australia) Garth Rainsbury
TAG Heuer	Porsche	996 GT3 Cup	67	(Australia) Eric Bana
PR Technology Racing	Porsche	997 Clubsport	68	(Australia) Kim Burke
www.xacarz.com.au	Dodge	Viper GTS ACR	69	(Australia) Scott Lyddiard
Equity-one	Porsche	997 Clubsport	71	(Australia) Dean Koutsoumidis (Australia) Michael Goedheer
Lentini Dental	Porsche	996 GT3 Cup	73	(Australia) Michael Lentini
Bicycle Express	Ferrari	360 Challenge	74	(Australia) Keith Wong
Creative Colour	Porsche	996 GT3 Cup	75	(Australia) Jeff Bobik
The Oxford Tavern Wollongong	Porsche	996 GT3 Cup	77	(Australia) Anthony Kosseris
Urban Arrangements	Lotus	Elise	86	(Australia) Angela Coradine (Australia) Angelo Lazaris
Urban Arrangements	Lotus	Elise Motorsport 200	99	(Australia) Peter Lucas (Australia) Scott Bargwanna
Industry Central; Stahlwille	Ferrari	F430 GT3	88	(Australia) John Teulan
Macpherson & Kelley Lawyers	Porsche	996 GT3	90	(Australia) Sven Burchartz
Haden/Smith Brothers	Porsche	996 GT3 Cup	91	(Australia) Graeme Cook
Simply Sportscars	Lotus	Exige S	97	(Australia) Timothy Poulton
Quintessence Constructions	Lotus	Elise GT3	98	(Australia) Angelo Lazaris

== Race calendar ==
The championship was contested over a six-round series.

Rd.	Name	Circuit	Location / state	Date	Winner	Car
Rd 1		Eastern Creek Raceway	Sydney, New South Wales	1–3 February	Allan Simonsen	Ferrari F430 GT3
Rd 2		Adelaide Street Circuit	Adelaide, South Australia	21–24 February	Allan Simonsen	Ferrari F430 GT3
Rd 3		Albert Park Grand Prix Circuit	Melbourne, Victoria	13–16 March	Mark Eddy	Lamborghini Gallardo
Rd 4		Eastern Creek Raceway	Sydney, New South Wales	12–13 July	John Kaias	Aston Martin DBRS9
Rd 5		Phillip Island Grand Prix Circuit	Phillip Island, Victoria	9–10 August	John Bowe	Lamborghini Gallardo
Rd 6	Sandown GT Classic	Sandown International Raceway	Melbourne, Victoria	28–30 November	Allan Simonsen; Nick O'Halloran	Ferrari F430 GT3

== Points system ==
Championship points were awarded on a 38-32-28-25-23-21-19-18-17-16-15-14-13-12-11-10-9-8-7-6-5-4-3-2-1 to the first 25 finishers in each race. Each driver's worst round point score had to be dropped from his/her overall point score.

Drivers competing with a foreign licence and a Foreign Participation Visa under FIA ISC Regulation 18 Para 5 (e.g. Hector Lester) were not allowed to score championship points.

== Championship results ==
=== GT Championship ===
Pos	Driver	Round 1 - EAS			Round 2 - ADE			Round 3 - ALB				Round 4 - EAS			Round 5 - PHI			Round 6 - SAN		Pts
Pos	Driver	Race 1	Race 2	Race 3	Race 1	Race 2	Race 3	Race 1	Race 2	Race 3	Race 4	Race 1	Race 2	Race 3	Race 1	Race 2	Race 3	Race 1	Race 2	Pts
1	Mark Eddy				4th	4th	3rd	3rd	2nd	1st	2nd	4th	3rd	5th	2nd	2nd	2nd	4th	7th	412
2	Allan Simonsen	1st	1st	1st	1st	1st	1st											1st	1st	351
3	Ross Lilley	6th	4th	4th	5th	5th	4th	20th	Ret	7th	16th	5th	6th	3rd				3rd	2nd	337.75
4	John Kaias	3rd	2nd	3rd	Ret	DNS	DNS	4th	Ret	16th	7th	3rd	1st	1st	3rd	3rd	3rd	DNS	DNS	323.25
5	John Bowe							1st	8th	2nd	1st				1st	1st	1st	7th	4th	290.25
6	Peter Lucas	4th	6th	5th				18th	12th	4th	10th	1st	2nd	2nd						220.5
7	Michael Loccisano							11th	6th	8th	9th				7th	5th	9th	10th	9th	169.25
8	Anthony Kosseris	8th	Ret	6th	15th	12th	9th	9th	11th	10th	Ret	16th	10th	12th						162.5
9	Scott Bargwanna				2nd	2nd	2nd					6th	5th	6th						161
10	John Teulan	5th	Ret	DNS	6th	3rd	12th	Ret	7th	Ret	DNS	7th	7th	8th						158.75
11	Richard Kimber											11th	12th	10th	5th	8th	8th	14th	12th	150
12	Ted Huglin							19th	Ret	Ret	20th	15th	14th	15th	Ret	Ret	7th	7th	4th	144.25
13	David Stevens				9th	8th	5th	6th	3rd	3rd	3rd									143.25
14	Nick O'Halloran											14th	13th	13th	4th	7th	4th	1st	1st	117
15	Mark Krashos				14th	10th	8th	Ret	15th	Ret	15th	13th	11th	11th						110
15	Andrew Taplin				13th	7th	7th											9th	8th	110
17	Dean Grant							10th	10th	9th	8th							9th	8th	106.5
18	D'arcy Russell				3rd	Ret	DNS	5th	4th	6th	5th									102.25
19	Graeme Cook				11th	11th	11th					9th	15th	7th						96
19	Greg Crick																	3rd	2nd	96
21	Craig Baird	2nd	3rd	2nd																92
22	Tony Quinn																	2nd	3rd	84
23	Peter Hackett											2nd	4th	4th						82
24	Nick Kelly	9th	7th	8th				15th	17th	DNS	14th									80.25
25	Angelo Lazaris							DNS	18th	12th	17th	8th	9th	14th				16th	Ret	72.75
26	Tim Poulton											17th	Ret	16th	11th	9th	10th	DNS	Ret	72
27	Keith Wong				10th	9th	10th	Ret	DNS	DNS	DNS				9th	Ret	DNS			70
28	Garth Walden														8th	4th	5th			69
29	Fraser Kirchner							Ret	20th	14th	18th				12th	11th	13th			66
30	Des Wall							7th	9th	5th	6th									63.75
31	Max Twigg																	5th	6th	63
32	Ash Samadi	7th	5th	7th																61
32	Beric Lynton														10th	6th	6th			61
34	Peter Fountas				12th	Ret	13th	17th	21st	17th	19th							13th	Ret	53.75
35	Greg Ward Jr.	DNS	DNS	DNS								10th	8th	9th						51
35	Marc Cini																	10th	9th	51
37	Sven Burchartz							8th	5th	20th	11th									50.25
38	Jim Manolios																	12th	10th	48
39	Eric Bana																	11th	11th	45
40	Garth Rainsbury														13th	10th	14th			44
41	Kevin Miller	Ret	DNS	DNS				12th	16th	11th	13th									41.25
42	Dean Koutsoumidis																	Ret	13th	39
42	Michael Goedheer																	Ret	13th	39
44	Kim Burke											12th	Ret	DNS	6th	Ret	DNS	DNS	DNS	37
45	Simon Middleton				Ret	Ret	Ret	14th	14th	19th	12th									36.75
46	Michael Lentini							13th	13th	13th	Ret									30.75
47	David Mackie														14th	Ret	11th			29
48	Simon Froude							16th	19th	15th	DNS									22.5
49	Adam Wallis				8th	Ret	DNS													19
50	Mark O'Connor														Ret	Ret	12th	Ret	Ret	15
-	Hector Lester				7th	6th	6th	2nd	1st	18th	4th									0
-	Jon Trende							DNS	DNS	DNS	DNS									0
-	Scott Lyddiard							Ret	DNS	DNS	DNS									0
-	Andrew MacPherson														DNS	DNS	DNS	15th	Ret	0
-	Angela Coradine																	15th	DNS	0
-	Rod Wilson																	15th	Ret	0
-	Ray Angus																	13th	Ret	0
-	Jeff Bobik							Ret	DNS	DNS	DNS									0
-	Ivan Capelli																	5th	6th	0

Colour	Result
Gold	Winner
Silver	Second place
Bronze	Third place
Green	Points classification
Blue	Non-points classification
Blue	Non-classified finish (NC)
Purple	Retired, not classified (Ret)
Red	Did not qualify (DNQ)
Red	Did not pre-qualify (DNPQ)
Black	Disqualified (DSQ)
White	Did not start (DNS)
White	Withdrew (WD)
White	Race cancelled (C)
Blank	Did not practice (DNP)
Blank	Did not arrive (DNA)
Blank	Excluded (EX)

=== GT Challenge ===
The GT Challenge class was won by Richard Kimber driving a Porsche 996 GT3 Clubsport.

=== GT Production ===
The GT Production class was won by Tim Poulton driving a Lotus Exige S.

== Australian Tourist Trophy ==
The Confederation of Australian Motorsport awarded the 2008 Australian Tourist Trophy to the winners of the 2008 Sandown GT Classic, which was the sixth and final round of the 2008 Australian GT Championship. The title, which was the nineteenth Australian Tourist Trophy, was won by Allan Simonsen and Nick O'Halloren, driving a Ferrari F430 GT3.
