= Maranello Motorsport =

(Australia) Maranello Motorsport
- Founded: 2000
- Team principal(s): Mark Coffey
- Current series: Australian GT Championship
- Former series: Nations Cup
- Noted drivers: (Australia) John Bowe (Australia) David Brabham (Australia) Paul Stokell (Finland) Mika Salo (Denmark) Allan Simonsen (Finland) Toni Vilander (Australia) Jamie Whincup (Australia) Craig Lowndes
- Teams' Championships: 2004 Bahrain GT Classic; 2007 Australian GT Championship; 2007 Sandown GT Classic; 2008 Sandown GT Classic; 2014 Bathurst 12 Hour; 2017 Bathurst 12 Hour

Maranello Motorsport is an Australian company based in Richmond, Victoria that specialises in Ferrari car sales, sourcing, service and restoration, as well as a sports car racing team. It was formed in the late 1990s by Mark Coffey to enter Australia's then premier sports car racing series, Nations Cup. It currently competes in the Australian GT Championship and Bathurst 12 Hour.

== Racing history ==
=== Australian GT ===
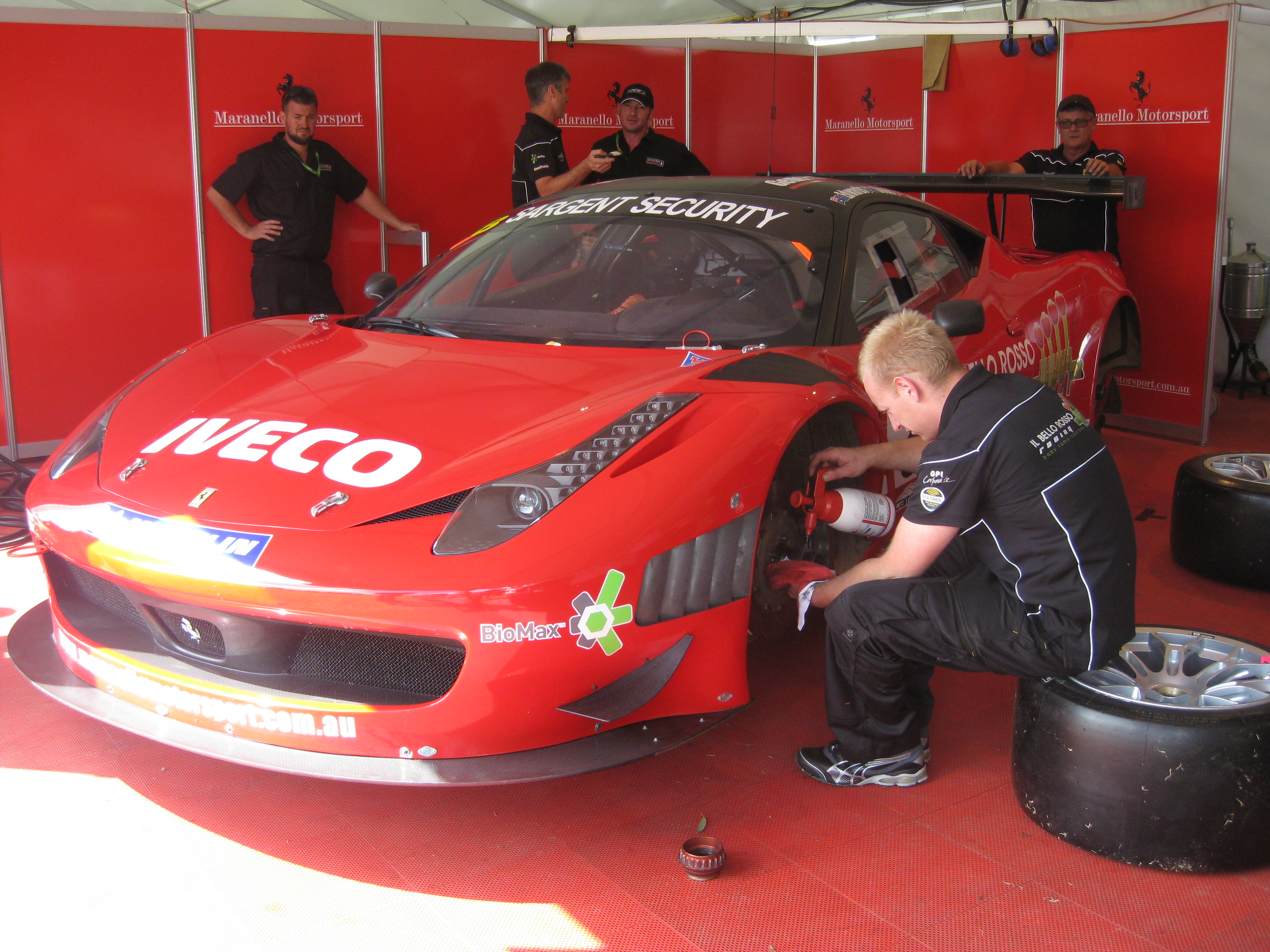
The No.8 Ferrari 458 Italia GT3

Maranello Motorsport has supported various customers in the Australian GT Championship.

In 2007 the team upgraded to the latest F430GT3 and despite it not arriving until mid-season, went on to a string of podium finishes and fastest laps before winning the 2007 Australian GT Championship and the 2007 Sandown GT Classic with Allan Simonsen and Tim Leahey driving. This was repeated in 2008 when Allan Simonsen and Nick O'Halloran won the GT Classic again.

After campaigning a number of 430GT3's through 2009/10, 2011 saw the arrival of the new F458GT3 late in the year but just in time for the 2011 Bathurst Sprint. Its debut at this event sent shock waves through Australian motorsport when a new lap record of 2.04.95 was set by SImonsen early on the last morning of the event. This was nearly two whole seconds faster than Greg Murphy's "Lap of the Gods" from 2006 and sent the timekeepers into such disbelief that they initially deleted the lap, believing it was a timing error. The time was later reinstated after the team's data showed the same time.

One of their long-term drivers, Peter Edwards, went through the Maranello driver training system and started racing a Ferrari 360 Challenge, before graduating to a 430 GT3. Cameron McConville and Nick O’Halloran competed in Maranello’s black Ferrari, supported by Apex Tubulars, while the team’s second red car was driven by two-time Bathurst 1000 winner John Bowe and Edwards in 2012.

=== Bathurst 12 Hour ===
Maranello Motorsport won the 2014 Liqui Moly Bathurst 12 Hour at the Mount Panorama Circuit on 9 February. Bowe and Edwards were joined in the team's winning Ferrari 458 GT3 by V8 Supercars driver Craig Lowndes and former Formula One driver Mika Salo.

In a Ferrari 488 GT3, the team repeated their triumph in 2017, with Lowndes being joined by Toni Vilander and Jamie Whincup.
