= Allan Simonsen (racing driver) =

Danish racing driver (1978–2013)

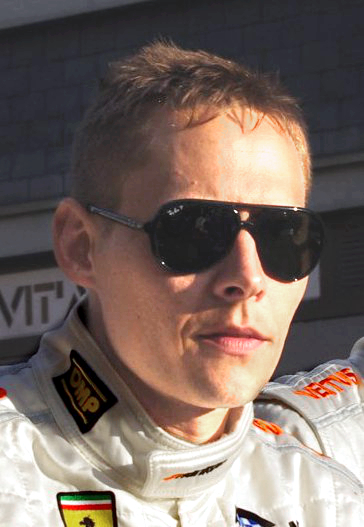
- Simonsen in 2011
- Nationality: (Denmark) Danish
- Born: Allan Weel Simonsen; 5 July 1978 Odense, Denmark
- Died: 22 June 2013 (aged 34) Le Mans, France

Previous series
- 1999 1999 2000 2001 2001 2002 2003–2004 2003–2007 2005 2005–2012 2006 2006, 2008 2006–2009 2007–2013 2008 2009 2009, 2012 2009–2012 2010, 2012 2010, 2012 2010–2012 2011–2013 2012–2013 2013: Formula Ford 1800 Netherlands; Danish Formula Ford Championship; Formula Palmer Audi; German Formula Three Championship; British Formula Renault Championship; British GT Championship; Australian Nations Cup Championship; V8 Supercars; V8 Ute Racing Series; European Le Mans Series; FIA GT3 European Championship; FIA GT Championship; Australian GT Championship; British GT Championship; American Le Mans Series; Aussie Racing Cars; Rolex Sports Car Series; V8 Supercars; VLN; Porsche Carrera Cup Asia; PSCRAA Enduro Championship; Australian GT Championship; FIA World Endurance Championship; ADAC GT Masters

Championship titles
- 1999 2007: Danish Formula Ford Championship; Australian GT Championship

24 Hours of Le Mans career
- Years: 2007–2013
- Teams: Autorlando Sport; KSM; Hankook Team Farnbacher; Aston Martin Racing
- Best finish: 12th (2010)
- Class wins: 0

Allan Weel Simonsen (5 July 1978 – 22 June 2013) was a Danish racing driver, born in Odense. He died after a crash during the third lap of the 2013 24 Hours of Le Mans.

== Career ==
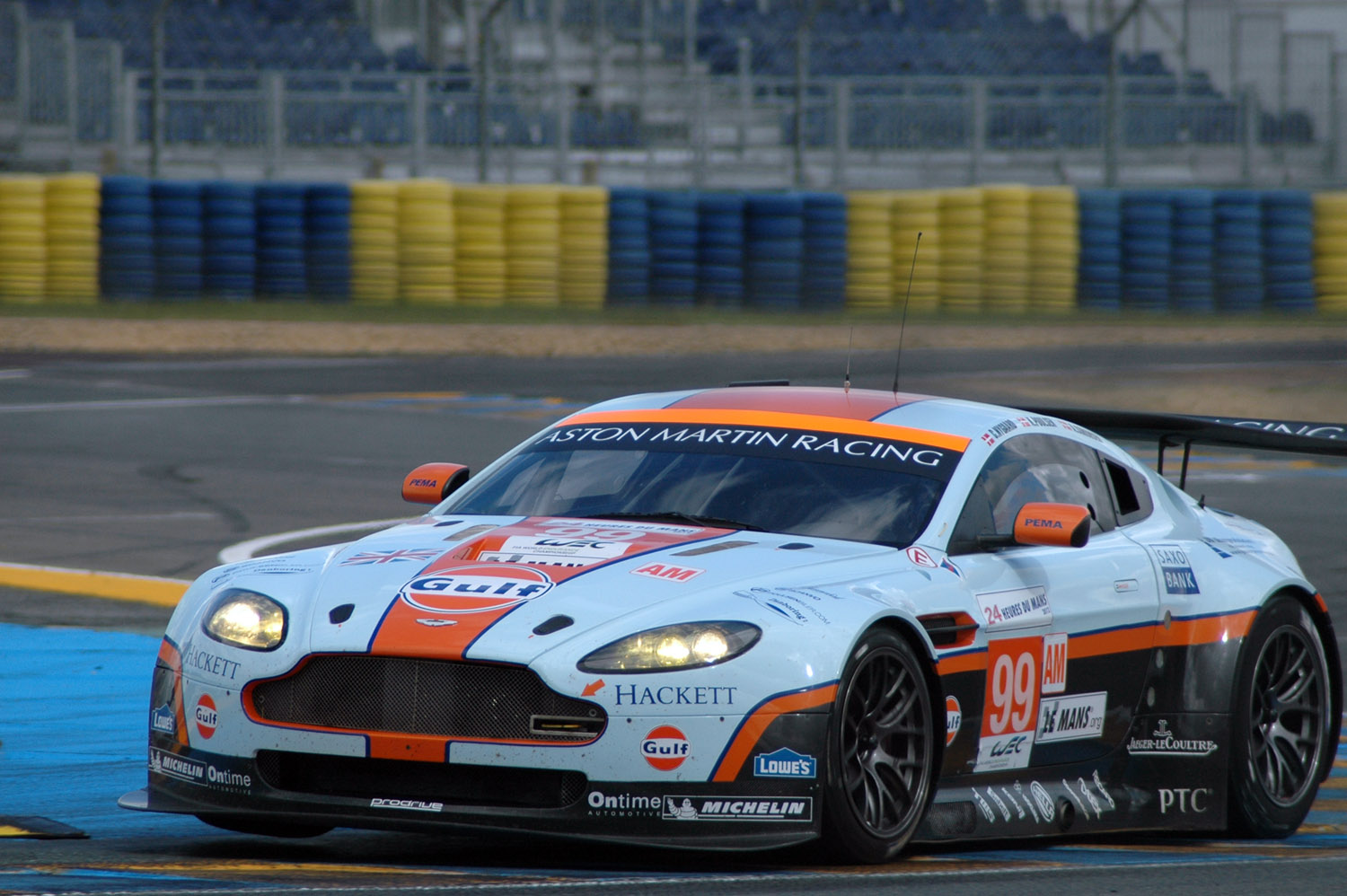
Simonsen driving an Aston Martin Vantage GTE at the test session prior to the 2012 24 Hours of Le Mans.

After beginning his career in karting racing against the likes of future Formula One World Champion Kimi Räikkönen, Simonsen moved to cars in 1999, winning the Danish Formula Ford Championship. He raced in Formula Palmer Audi in 2000, before moving to German Formula 3 and Formula Renault 2.0 UK in 2001.

Simonsen moved to sports car racing for 2002, driving a Ferrari 360 for Veloqx Motorsport in the British GT Championship. He began racing in Australia in 2003 for Mark Coffey Racing, driving a Ferrari 360 Challenge to eighth place in the 2003 Australian Nations Cup Championship for GT style cars and second place in Group 2. He would then go on to finish in eighth place in the 2003 Bathurst 24 Hour driving a Lamborghini Diablo GTR. In the 2004 Australian Nations Cup Championship, he drove the 360 to third place in the Trophy Class while driving a V12 powered 550 Millennio in a limited campaign to seventh in the outright class.

While in Australia, Simonsen also drove in the Sandown 500 and Bathurst 1000 V8 Supercar events. Simonsen's best Bathurst result came in 2011, when he finished third for Kelly Racing, driving alongside Greg Murphy in a Holden Commodore VE. Simonsen won the Australian GT Championship in 2007 (driving both a Ferrari 360 GT and a Ferrari F430) and finished second in 2008 driving a Ferrari F430 GT.

At the 2011 Sprint Bathurst event, Simonsen set a blistering time of 2:04.95 around the famous Mount Panorama circuit. This was a monumental effort at the time, as it was a full two seconds faster than any V8 Supercar lap time and comparable to the Formula 3 lap record set in the following year. Simonsen's time was so quick that the officials initially removed it from the timing screens, for they believed it to be an error. It wasn't until it was confirmed by the manual time keeper and the team's own data, however, that the time was reinstated.

Simonsen placed fourth in the 2007 Le Mans Series season, in a partial season driving a Porsche 911 GT3 for Virgo Motorsport, which included a GT2 class win in the Nürburgring 1000. He drove Ferraris for Team Farnbacher in both the Le Mans Series as well as various international series from 2008 through 2011. During that time, Simonson won the GT2 class at the 2009 1000 km of Okayama with Dominik Farnbacher and the SP7 class in the 2010 24 Hours Nürburgring with Farnbacher, Leh Keen, and Marco Seefried. He participated in the 24 Hours of Le Mans seven times between 2007 and 2013, finishing on the GT2 class podium twice: third in 2007 and second in 2010.

== Death ==
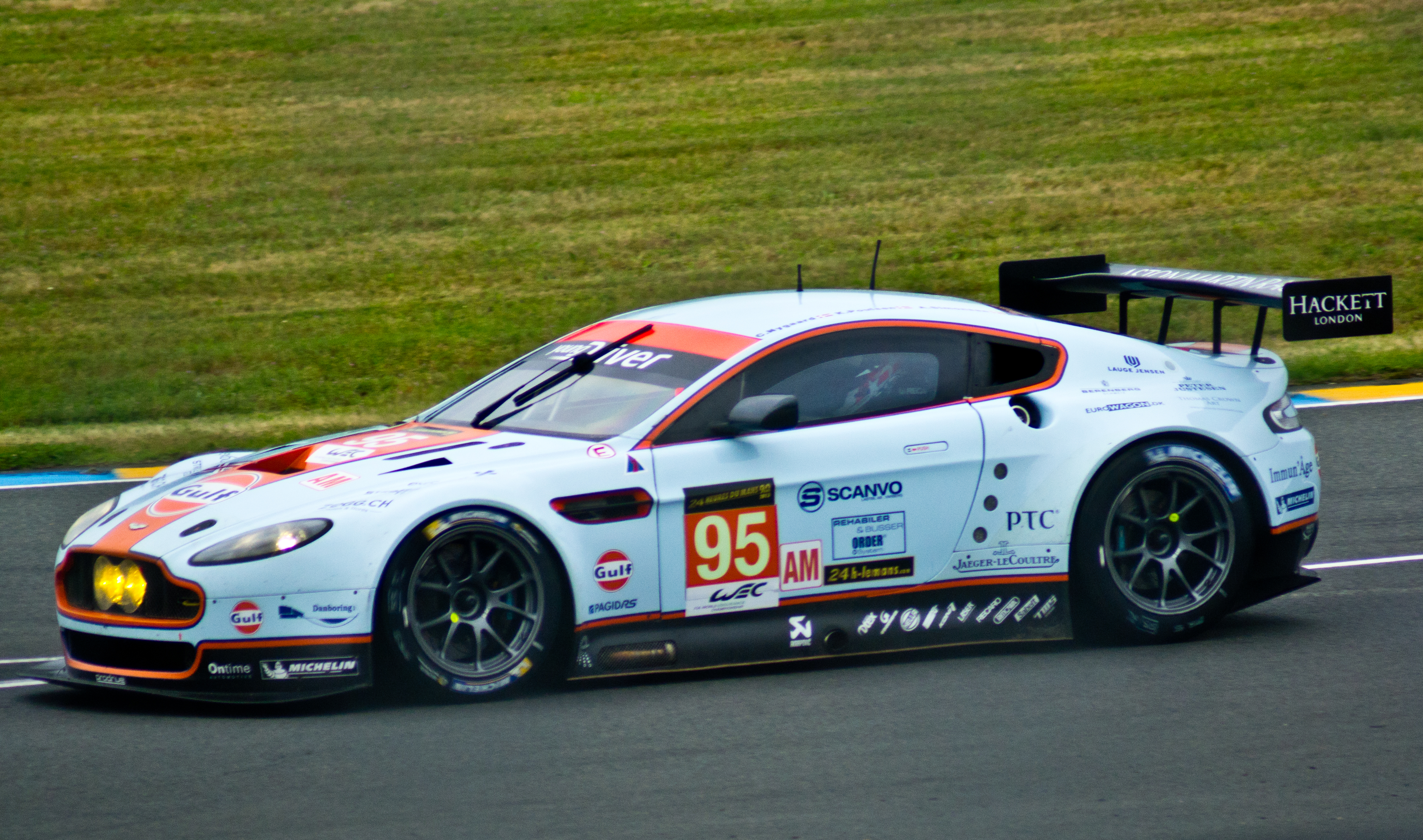
Simonsen in the No. 95 Aston Martin Vantage GTE before crashing

In the ninth minute of the 2013 24 Hours of Le Mans, and on his third lap, Simonsen was leading the LMGTE Am field with his No. 95 Aston Martin Vantage GTE. At the Tertre Rouge corner, Simonsen's car twitched as he accelerated through the right hand turn, and when he attempted to correct, the car veered left before impacting the crash barriers on the outside of the corner. He was extricated from the car, reportedly conscious, before being taken to the on-site medical centre where he succumbed to his injuries. His death was the first in racing conditions during the 24 Hours of Le Mans since Jo Gartner died in a 1986 crash, while French driver Sébastien Enjolras died more recently in a pre-qualifying session accident in 1997.

Race officials raised a Danish flag at half mast over the circuit's podium during the race in honor of Simonsen. Fellow Danish driver Tom Kristensen won the race overall and dedicated his team's victory to the memory of Simonsen.

== Memorials ==
The award for the fastest qualifier at the Bathurst 12 Hour, which Simonsen won in 2013, is named the Allan Simonsen Pole Position Trophy.

Year	Pole winner	Team	Car	Time
2014	(Germany) Maro Engel	Erebus Motorsport	Mercedes-Benz SLS AMG	2m 03.8586 sec
2015	(Belgium) Laurens Vanthoor	Phoenix Racing	Audi R8 LMS Ultra	2m 02.5521 sec
2016	(New Zealand) Shane van Gisbergen	Tekno Autosports	McLaren 650S GT3	2m 01.2860 sec
2017	(Finland) Toni Vilander	Maranello Motorsport	Ferrari 488 GT3	2m 02.8610 sec
2018	(Australia) Chaz Mostert	Schnitzer Motorsport	BMW M6 GT3	2m 01.9340 sec
2019	(Italy) Raffaele Marciello	Mercedes-AMG Team Mann Filter GruppeM Racing	Mercedes-AMG GT3	2m 02.9348 sec
2020	(Australia) Matt Campbell	Absolute Racing	Porsche 911 GT3 R	2m 03.5554 sec
2021	No race due to COVID-19 pandemic			
2022	(Australia) Chaz Mostert	CoinSpot Racing Team	Audi R8 LMS Evo II	2m 02.4930 sec
2023	(Germany) Maro Engel	Mercedes-AMG GruppeM Racing	Mercedes-AMG GT3	2m 00.8819 sec
2024	(South Africa) Sheldon van der Linde	Team WRT	BMW M4 GT3	2m 01.9810 sec
2025	(Austria) Lucas Auer	Mercedes-AMG GruppeM Racing	Mercedes-AMG GT3	2m 01.2760 sec
2026	(Australia) Cam Waters	Scott Taylor Motorsport	Mercedes-AMG GT3	2m 01.0790 sec

== Career results ==
=== Career summary ===
Season	Series	Position	Car	Team
1999	Danish Formula Ford Championship	1st	Van Diemen RF99 Ford	
2000	Formula Palmer Audi	11th	Van Diemen PA Audi	Team Brask
2001	British Formula Renault Championship	26th	Tatuus FR2000 Renault	PBR Racing
2003	Australian Nations Cup Championship	8th	Ferrari 360 Challenge	Mark Coffey Racing
2003	Australian Nations Cup Championship Group 2	2nd	Ferrari 360 Challenge	Mark Coffey Racing
2003	V8 Supercar Championship Series	67th	Holden Commodore VX	Garry Rogers Motorsport
2004	Australian Nations Cup Championship	7th	Ferrari 550 Millenio	Mark Coffey Racing
2004	Australian Nations Cup Championship Trophy Cars	3rd	Ferrari 550 Millenio	Mark Coffey Racing
2004	V8 Supercar Championship Series	52nd	Holden Commodore VY	Garry Rogers Motorsport
2004	British GT Championship GT Cup Class	13th	Ferrari 360 Modena	Lester/Glenvarigill Racing
2005	V8 Utes Series	10th	Ford BA Falcon XR8 Ute	Coopers Pale Ale Racing Team
2005	V8 Supercar Championship Series	57th	Holden Commodore VY	Perkins Engineering
2006	FIA GT3 European Championship	15th	Ferrari F430 GT3	JMB Racing
2006	FIA GT Championship GT2 Class	38th	Ferrari F430 GT3	Scuderia Ecosse
2006	Australian GT Championship	11th	Ferrari 360 GT	Consolidated Chemical Racing Team
2006	V8 Supercar Championship Series	46th	Ford BA Falcon	Triple Eight Race Engineering
2007	Australian GT Championship	1st	Ferrari 360 GT; Ferrari F430 GT3	Consolidated Chemical Racing Team; Mark Coffey Racing
2007	Australian Tourist Trophy	1st	Ferrari F430 GT3	Maranello Motorsport
2007	Le Mans Series LM GT2 Class	4th	Ferrari F430 GT3	Virgo Motorsport
2007	British GT Championship GT3 Class	10th	Ferrari F430 GT3	Christians in Motorsport
2007	V8 Supercar Championship Series	25th	Ford BF Falcon	Triple Eight Race Engineering
2008	FIA GT Championship GT1 Class	11th	Aston Martin DBR9	Gigawave Motorsport
2008	Australian GT Championship	2nd	Ferrari F430 GT3	Maranello Motorsport
2008	Australian Tourist Trophy	1st	Ferrari F430 GT3	Maranello Motorsport
2008	British GT Championship GT3 Class	7th	Ferrari F430 GT3	Christians in Motorsport
2008	American Le Mans Series GT2 Class	23rd	Ferrari F430 GT3	Tafel Racing
2008	Le Mans Series LM GT2 Class	17th	Porsche 997 GT3-RSR	Team Farnbacher
2009	Le Mans Series LM GT2 Class	7th	Ferrari F430 GT3	Team Farnbacher
2009	Asian Le Mans Series LM GT2 Class	1st	Ferrari F430 GT3	Team Farnbacher
2009	British GT Championship GT3 Class	4th	Ferrari F430 GT3	Team Rosso Verde
2009	Australian GT Championship	20th	Ferrari F430 GT3	Maranello Motorsport
2009	V8 Supercar Championship Series	58th	Ford FG Falcon	Triple Eight Race Engineering
2009	Le Mans Series LM GT2 Class	106th	Porsche 997 GT3 Cup	Farnbacher-Loles Racing
2010	British GT Championship GT3 Class	5th	Ferrari 430 Scuderia	Team Rosso Verde
2010	Le Mans Series LM GT2 Class	17th	Ferrari F430 GT3	Team Farnbacher
2010	V8 Supercar Championship Series	49th	Holden Commodore VE	Paul Morris Motorsport
2010	Le Mans Series LM GTE Pro Class	5th	Ferrari 458 GTC	Team Farnbacher
2011	British GT Championship GT3 Class	10th	Ferrari 430 Scuderia; Ferrari 458 GTC	Team Rosso Verde
2011	International V8 Supercars Championship	32nd	Holden Commodore VE	Kelly Racing; Brad Jones Racing
2012	International V8 Supercars Championship	52nd	Ford FG Falcon	Dick Johnson Racing
2012	Australian GT Championship	4th	Ferrari 458 GT	Maranello Motorsport
2012	British GT Championship GT3 Class	12th	Ferrari 458 Italia	Team Rosso Verde
2013	Australian GT Championship	17th	Ferrari 458 GT3	Maranello Motorsport

=== 24 Hours of Le Mans results ===
Year	Team	Co-drivers	Car	Class	Laps	Pos.	Class pos.
2007	(Italy) Autorlando Sport (Germany) Farnbacher Racing	(Germany) Pierre Ehret (Denmark) Lars-Erik Nielsen	Porsche 997 GT3-RSR	GT2	309	21st	3rd
2008	(Germany) Kruse Schiller Motorsport	(France) Jean de Pourtales (Japan) Hideki Noda	Lola B05/40-Mazda	LMP2	147	DNF	DNF
2009	(Germany) Hankook Team Farnbacher	(Germany) Dominik Farnbacher (San Marino) Christian Montanari	Ferrari F430 GT2	GT2	183	DNF	DNF
2010	(Germany) Hankook Team Farnbacher	(Germany) Dominik Farnbacher (United States) Leh Keen	Ferrari F430 GT2	GT2	336	12th	2nd
2011	(Germany) Hankook Team Farnbacher	(Germany) Dominik Farnbacher (United States) Leh Keen	Ferrari 458 Italia GTC	GTE; Pro	137	DNF	DNF
2012	(United Kingdom) Aston Martin Racing	(Denmark) Christoffer Nygaard (Denmark) Kristian Poulsen	Aston Martin Vantage GTE	GTE; Am	31	DNF	DNF
2013	(United Kingdom) Aston Martin Racing	(Denmark) Christoffer Nygaard (Denmark) Kristian Poulsen	Aston Martin Vantage GTE	GTE; Am	2	DNF	DNF

=== Bathurst 24 Hour results ===
Year	Team	Co-drivers	Car	Class	Laps	Pos.	Class pos.
2003	(Australia) Mark Coffey Racing	(Australia) Paul Stokell (Australia) Luke Youlden (Australia) Peter Hackett	Lamborghini Diablo GTR	A	487	8th	6th

=== Bathurst 12 Hour results ===
Year	Team	Co-drivers	Car	Class	Laps	Pos.	Class pos.
2010	(Australia) Action Racing	(Australia) Jason Bright (Australia) Marcus Zukanovic	Ford Mustang Shelby	I	121	26th	1st
2011	(Australia) Red Alert Laser Tag	(United Kingdom) Hector Lester (Australia) Luke Searle	Ferrari 430 GT3	A	276	6th	5th
2012	(Australia) Maranello Motorsport	(Australia) John Bowe (Australia) Peter Edwards (Germany) Dominik Farnbacher	Ferrari 458 GT3	A	114	DNF	DNF
2013	(Australia) Maranello Motorsport	(Australia) John Bowe (Australia) Peter Edwards (Finland) Mika Salo	Ferrari 458 GT3	A	111	DNF	DNF

=== International V8 Supercars Championship ===
V8 Supercar results
Year	Team	Car	1	2	3	4	5	6	7	8	9	10	11	12	13	14	15	16	17	18	19	20	21	22	23	24	25	26	27	28	29	30	31	32	33	34	35	36	37	Pos.	Pts
2003	Garry Rogers Motorsport	Holden Commodore VX	ADE; R1	ADE; R1	PHI; R3	EAS; R4	WIN; R5	BAR; R6	BAR; R7	BAR; R8	HDV; R9	HDV; R10	HDV; R11	QLD; R12	ORA; R13	SAN; R14; 29	BAT; R15; Ret	SUR; R16	SUR; R17	PUK; R18	PUK; R19	PUK; R20	EAS; R21	EAS; R22																69th	80
2004	Garry Rogers Motorsport	Holden Commodore VY	ADE; R1	ADE; R2	EAS; R3	PUK; R4	PUK; R5	PUK; R6	HDV; R7	HDV; R8	HDV; R9	BAR; R10	BAR; R11	BAR; R12	QLD; R13	WIN; R14	ORA; R15	ORA; R16	SAN; R17; Ret	BAT; R18; 10	SUR; R19	SUR; R20	SYM; R21	SYM; R22	SYM; R23	EAS; R24	EAS; R25	EAS; R26												51st	156
2005	Perkins Engineering	Holden Commodore VY	ADE; R1	ADE; R2	PUK; R3	PUK; R4	PUK; R5	BAR; R6	BAR; R7	BAR; R8	EAS; R9	EAS; R10	SHA; R11	SHA; R12	SHA; R13	HDV; R14	HDV; R15	HDV; R16	QLD; R17	ORA; R18	ORA; R19	SAN; R20; 17	BAT; R21; 20	SUR; R22	SUR; R23	SUR; R24	SYM; R25	SYM; R26	SYM; R27	PHI; R28	PHI; R29	PHI; R30								57th	128
2006	Triple Eight Race Engineering	Ford BA Falcon	ADE; R1	ADE; R2	PUK; R3	PUK; R4	PUK; R5	BAR; R6	BAR; R7	BAR; R8	WIN; R9	WIN; R10	WIN; R11	HDV; R12	HDV; R13	HDV; R14	QLD; R15	QLD; R16	QLD; R17	ORA; R18	ORA; R19	ORA; R20	SAN; R21; 17	BAT; R22; 12	SUR; R23	SUR; R24	SUR; R25	SYM; R26	SYM; R27	SYM; R28	BHR; R29	BHR; R30	BHR; R31	PHI; R32	PHI; R33	PHI; R34				46th	210
2007	Triple Eight Race Engineering	Ford BF Falcon	ADE; R1	ADE; R2	BAR; R3	BAR; R4	BAR; R5	PUK; R6	PUK; R7	PUK; R8	WIN; R9	WIN; R10	WIN; R11	EAS; R12	EAS; R13	EAS; R14	HDV; R15	HDV; R16	HDV; R17	QLD; R18	QLD; R19	QLD; R20	ORA; R21	ORA; R22	ORA; R23	SAN; R24; 10	BAT; R25; 5	SUR; R26	SUR; R27	SUR; R28	BHR; R29	BHR; R30	BHR; R31	SYM; R32	SYM; R33	SYM; R34	PHI; R35	PHI; R36	PHI; R37	25th	63
2009	Triple Eight Race Engineering	Ford FG Falcon	ADE; R1	ADE; R2	HAM; R3	HAM; R4	WIN; R5	WIN; R6	SYM; R7	SYM; R8	HDV; R9	HDV; R10	TOW; R11	TOW; R12	SAN; R13	SAN; R14	QLD; R15	QLD; R16	PHI; Q 10	PHI; R17; 21	BAT; R18; Ret	SUR; R19	SUR; R20	SUR; R21	SUR; R22	PHI; R23	PHI; R24	BAR; R25	BAR; R26	SYD; R27	SYD; R28									59th	91
2010	Paul Morris Motorsport	Holden Commodore VE	YMC; R1	YMC; R2	BHR; R3	BHR; R4	ADE; R5	ADE; R6	HAM; R7	HAM; R8	QLD; R9	QLD; R10	WIN; R11	WIN; R12	HDV; R13	HDV; R14	TOW; R15	TOW; R16	PHI; Q	PHI; R17	BAT; R18; 6	SUR; R19	SUR; R20	SYM; R21	SYM; R22	SAN; R23	SAN; R24	SYD; R25	SYD; R26											49th	204
2011	Kelly Racing	Holden Commodore VE	YMC; R1	YMC; R2	ADE; R3	ADE; R4	HAM; R5	HAM; R6	BAR; R7	BAR; R8	BAR; R9	WIN; R10	WIN; R11	HID; R12	HID; R13	TOW; R14	TOW; R15	QLD; R16	QLD; R17	QLD; R18	PHI; Q 23	PHI; R19; 13	BAT; R20; 3																	32nd	509
2011	Brad Jones Racing	Holden Commodore VE																						SUR; R21; 17	SUR; R22; 17	SYM; R23	SYM; R24	SAN; R25	SAN; R26	SYD; R27	SYD; R28									32nd	509
2012	Dick Johnson Racing	Ford FG Falcon	ADE; R1	ADE; R2	SYM; R3	SYM; R4	HAM; R5	HAM; R6	BAR; R7	BAR; R8	BAR; R9	PHI; R10	PHI; R11	HID; R12	HID; R13	TOW; R14	TOW; R15	QLD; R16	QLD; R17	SMP; R18	SMP; R19	SAN; Q 26	SAN; R20; 21	BAT; R21; 17	SUR; R22	SUR; R23	YMC; R24	YMC; R25	YMC; R26	WIN; R27	WIN; R28	SYD; R29	SYD; R30							52nd	108

=== Complete Bathurst 1000 results ===
Year	Team	Car	Co-driver	Position	Laps
2003	Garry Rogers Motorsport	Holden Commodore VX	(Australia) Nathan Pretty	DNF	42
2004	Garry Rogers Motorsport	Holden Commodore VY	(Australia) Nathan Pretty	10th	160
2005	Perkins Engineering	Holden Commodore VZ	(Australia) Alex Davison	20th	129
2006	Triple Eight Race Engineering	Ford Falcon BA	(United Kingdom) Richard Lyons	12th	161
2007	Triple Eight Race Engineering	Ford Falcon BF	(United Kingdom) Richard Lyons	5th	161
2009	Triple Eight Race Engineering	Ford Falcon FG	(United Kingdom) James Thompson	DNF	152
2010	Paul Morris Motorsport	Holden Commodore VE	(New Zealand) Greg Murphy	6th	161
2011	Kelly Racing	Holden Commodore VE	(New Zealand) Greg Murphy	3rd	161
2012	Dick Johnson Racing	Ford Falcon FG	(Australia) Steven Johnson	17th	161

Sporting positions
Preceded by Greg Crick	Australian GT; Champion; 2007	Succeeded by Mark Eddy
