= Australian GT Trophy Series =

The Australian GT Trophy Series is an annual Australian motor racing competition for FIA GT3 cars and similar approved automobiles. It is managed by Trofeo Motorsport Pty Ltd and sanctioned by the Motorsport Australia, formerly known as the Confederation of Australian Motor Sport (CAMS) as an Authorised Series.

== Series winners ==
- 2016 – Rob Smith (Audi R8 LMS)
- 2017 – Steve McLaughlan (Audi R8 LMS Ultra)
- 2018 – Nick Kelly (Audi R8 LMS Ultra)
- 2021 – Brad Schumacher (Audi R8 LMS Ultra)
- 2022 – Michael Kokkinos (Audi R8 LMS Ultra)

== See also ==
- Australian GT Championship
