= 2006 Australian GT Championship =

Motor racing competition

Seasons
- ← 2005 2007 →

The 2006 Australian GT Championship was a CAMS sanctioned national motor racing title for drivers of closed, production based sports cars. It was open to vehicles approved by the FIA for International GT3 competition and to similar models as approved by CAMS. The Australian GT Sportscar Group Pty Ltd was recognised by CAMS as the Category Manager and Administrator for championship.

The title, which was the tenth Australian GT Championship, was won by Greg Crick driving a Dodge Viper GTS ACR.

== Teams and Drivers ==
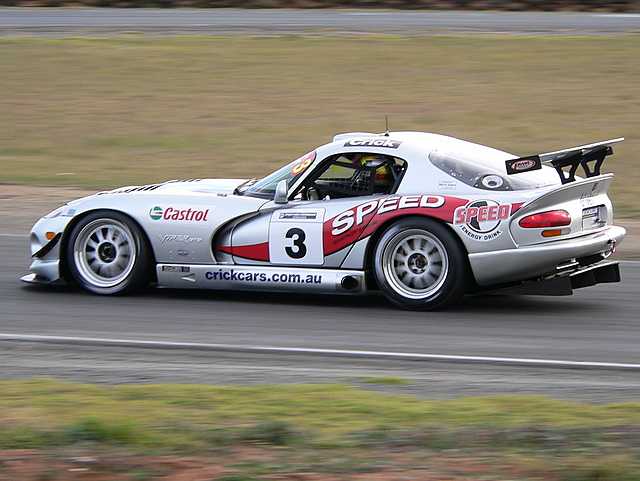
Greg Crick (Dodge Viper GTS ACR) won the championship

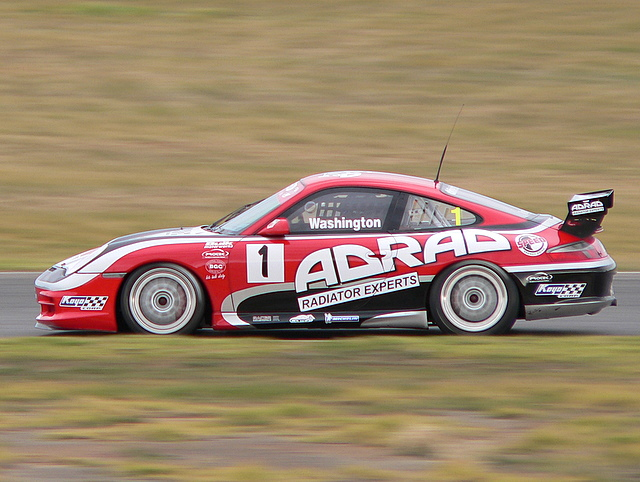
Bryce Washington (Porsche 911 GT3 Cup Car Type 996) placed second

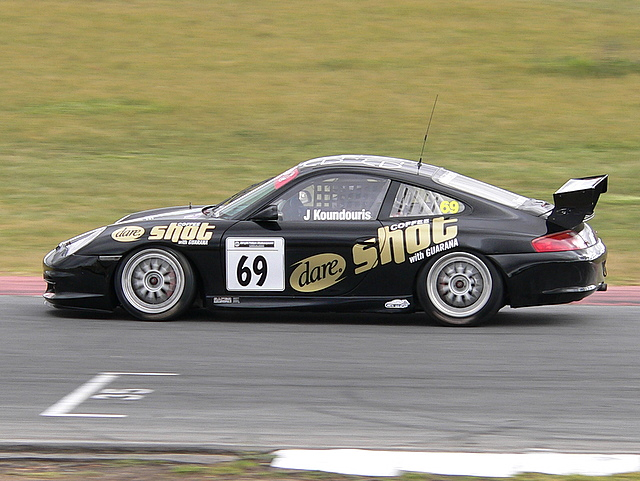
James Koundouris (Porsche 911 GT3 Cup Car Type 996) placed third

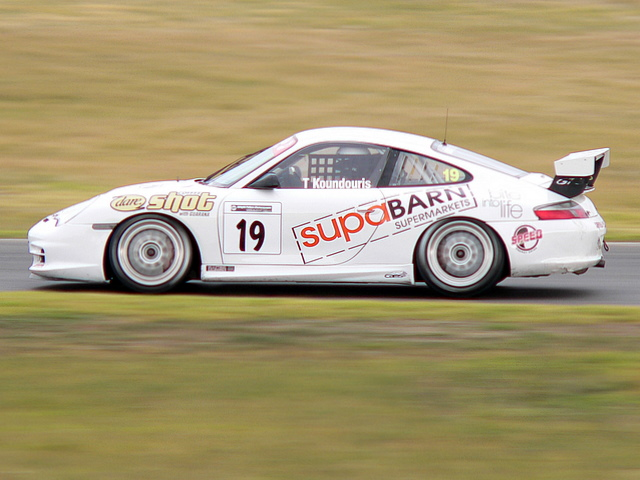
Theo Koundouris (Porsche 911 GT3 Cup Car Type 996) placed fourth

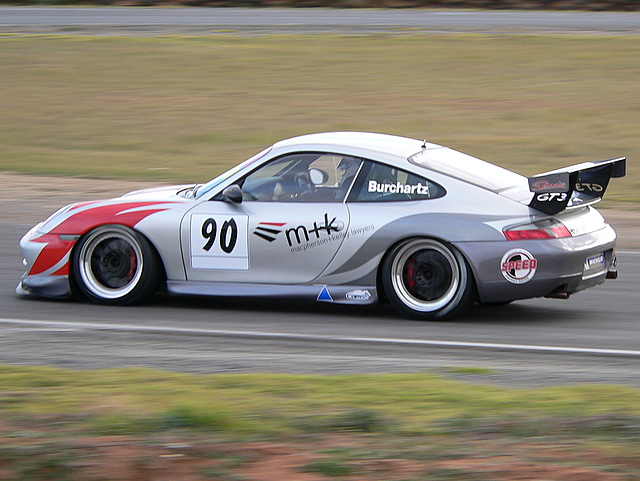
Sven Burchartz (Porsche 911 GT3 Type 996) placed fifth

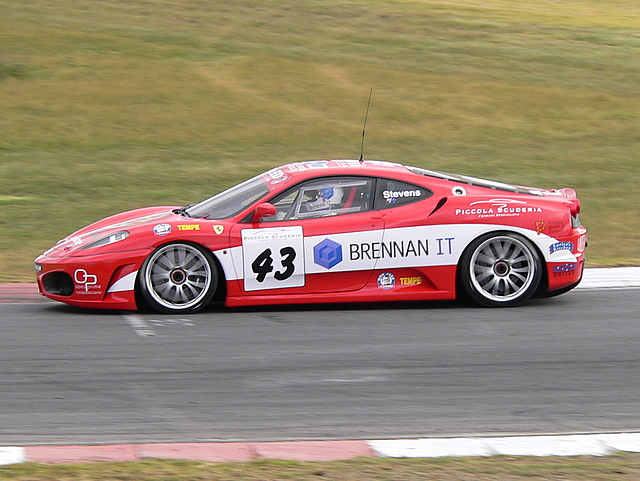
David Stevens placed 13th driving a Porsche 911 GT3 Cup Car Type 996 & a Ferrari 430 Challenge (pictured)

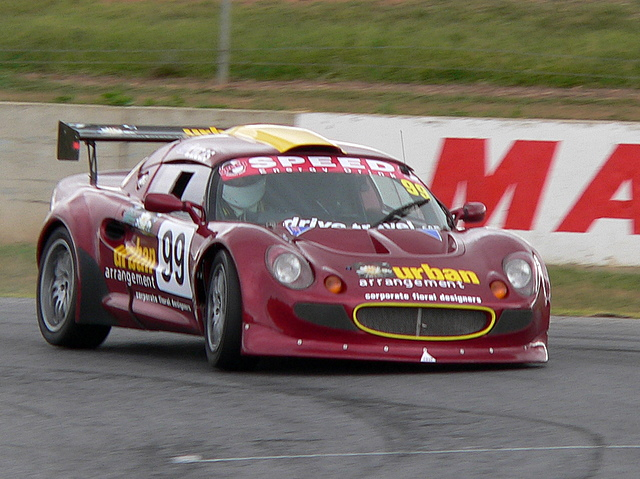
Peter Lucas (Lotus Elise Motorsport 200) placed 31st

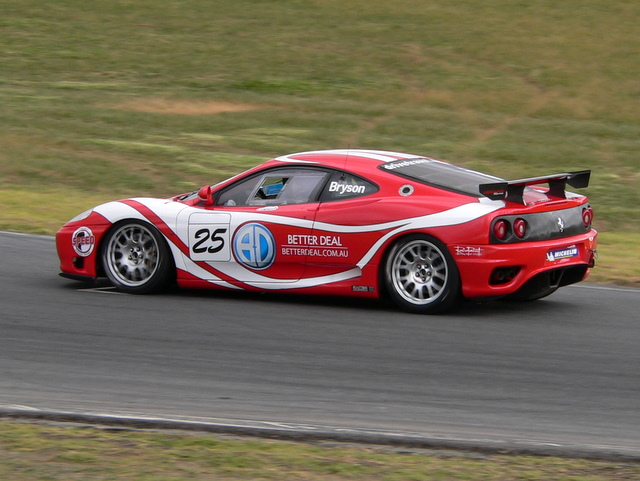
Neil Bryson (Ferrari 360 Challenge) placed 39th

Entrant	Car	No.	Drivers	Rounds	Secondary Driver	Rounds
ADRAD Radiator Experts	Porsche 911 GT3 Cup Car	1	(Australia) Bryce Washington	All		
Property Solutions Group	Ferrari F430	2	(Australia) Kevin Miller	7–8		
Property Solutions Group	Porsche 911 GT3 Cup Car	44	(Australia) Bill Pye	2		
Crickcars.com	Dodge Viper GTS ACR	3	(Australia) Greg Crick	All		
Consolidated Chemical Company	Ferrari 360 GT	4	(Denmark) Allan Simonsen	1, 4		
Dare Shots / Supabarn Supermarkets	Porsche 911 GT3 Cup Car	19	(Australia) Theo Koundouris	1–3, 5–7		
Dare Shots / Supabarn Supermarkets	Porsche 911 GT3 Cup Car	69	(Australia) James Koundouris	All	(Denmark) Allan Simonsen	6
Dare Shots / Supabarn Supermarkets	Porsche 911 GT3 Cup Car	69	(Australia) James Koundouris	All	(Australia) Theo Koundouris	8
Team Lamborghini Australia	Lamborghini Diablo GTR	5	(Australia) Peter Hackett	2		
Bob Jane T-Marts	Porsche 911 GT3 Cup Car	6	(Australia) David Reynolds	2		
Witches Chase Cheese Co.	Lotus Exige	6	(Australia) Andre Morriss	7–8	(Australia) Andrew Fisher	8
Dupont	Dodge Viper GTS ACR	7	(Australia) D'Arcy Russell	1–2, 4, 6, 8	(Australia) Dean Lindstrom	8
Hallmarc	Porsche 911 GT3 Cup Car	9	(Australia) Marc Cini	2, 8	(Australia) Dean Fiore	8
Jim Beam Racing	Ford Mustang	10	(Australia) Geoff Munday	1		
Quarterback Shirts	Porsche 911 GT3 R	12	(Australia) Mark Eddy	1–2, 7		
PROMAT	Porsche 911 GT3 Cup Car	13	(Australia) Matthew Turnbull	1–3, 5		
Greg Ward Racing	Porsche 911 GT3 Cup Car	14	(Australia) Greg Ward	4, 8	(Australia) David Giugni	8
Twigg Waste Management	Porsche 911 GT3 Type 996	17	(Australia) Max Twigg	1–6, 8	(Australia) Andrew Luxton	6, 8
Instant Fountains Paluki Ho	Honda NSX	20	(Australia) Ian Palmer	1, 3–4		
Steel Force	Lotus Exige	22	(Australia) Paul Ryan	7–8	N/A	
Wynn Tresidder Management	Porsche 911 GT3 Cup Car	23	(Australia) Paul Tresidder	1–3, 6, 8	(Australia) Bill Pye	8
Betterdeal.com.au	Ferrari 360 Challenge	25	(Australia) Neil Bryson	4–5		
Buildwise	Porsche 911 GT3 Cup Car	29	(Australia) Claudie Giorgi	5		
Juniper Racing	Porsche 911 GT3 Cup Car	30	(Australia) Shaun Juniper	5–6		
Lynn Building Supplies	Porsche 911 GT3 Cup Car	32	(Australia) Blake Lynn	8	(Australia) Malcolm Lynn	8
RDS	Porsche 911 GT3 RSR	38	(Australia) David Wall	1–3, 5–6, 8		
Bennanit Secure Telecom	Porsche 911 GT3 Cup Car	43	(Australia) David Stevens	2		
Bennanit Secure Telecom	Ferrari F430 Challenge	43	(Australia) David Stevens	4–6		
Bolin Racing	Porsche 911 GT3	45	(Australia) Paul Bolinowsky	1–2, 6–8	(Australia) Christian D'Agostin	6
Bolin Racing	Porsche 911 GT3	45	(Australia) Paul Bolinowsky	1–2, 6–8	(Australia) Paul Pizzati	8
Travelplan Ski Holiday	Porsche 911 GT3	46	(Australia) Anthony Skinner	1–2, 7		
Loloa Furniture International	Porsche 911 GT3 Cup Car	51	(Australia) Ross Lilley	1–2		
Roock	Porsche 911 GT3 Cup Car	55	(Australia) Ash Samandi	1	(Australia) Ash Samandi	8
Roock	Porsche 911 GT3 Cup Car	55	(Australia) Damien Flack	3–4, 6, 8	(Australia) Ash Samandi	8
Urban Arrangement	Lotus Exige	56	(Australia) Tim Poulton	8		
Urban Arrangement	Lotus Elise	86	(Australia) Angela Coradine	8	(Australia) Glen Townsend	8
Speed Energy Drink	Ferrari 360 Challenge	66	(Australia) Garth Rainsbury	1		
PHR Scuderia	Porsche 911 GT3 Cup Car	70	(Monaco) Maher Algadri	3		
PHR Scuderia	Porsche 911 GT3 Cup Car	70	(Australia) Stuart Kostera	4		
ABCOR Preston General Engine	Porsche 911 GT3 Cup Car	77	(Australia) John Kaias	1–2, 4		
AutoHaus Hamilton	Lotus Elise Motorsport 200	78	(Australia) Justin Levis	2		
AutoHaus Hamilton	Porsche 911 GT3 Cup Car	78	(Australia) Justin Levis	6	(Australia) Bill Pye	6
Industry Central Stahlwille	Ferrari 360 Challenge	88	(Australia) John Teulan	1–4, 6–8		
Industry Central Stahlwille	Ferrari F430 Challenge	88	(Australia) John Teulan	1–4, 6–8		
Cargraphic AG	Porsche 911 GT3	90	(Australia) Sven Burchartz	2, 6–8	(Australia) David Reynolds	6, 8
Container Solutions	Porsche 911 GT3 Cup Car	91	(Australia) Graeme Cook	1, 5		
Urban Developments	Lotus Elise Motorsport 200	99	(Australia) Peter Lucas	1, 5, 8	(Australia) Scott Bargwanna	8

== Round schedule ==
The championship was contested over eight rounds.

Round	Circuit	State	Date	Format	Winning driver	Car
1	Wakefield Park Raceway	New South Wales	5 March	Three races	Allan Simonsen	Ferrari F360 GT
2	Mount Panorama Circuit	New South Wales	15 April	Two races	Greg Crick	Dodge Viper GTS ACR
3	Oran Park Raceway	New South Wales	7 May	Three races	Bryce Washington	Porsche 911 GT3 Cup Car Type 996
4	Phillip Island Grand Prix Circuit	Victoria	21 May	Three races	Allan Simonsen	Ferrari F360 GT
5	Mallala Motor Sport Park	South Australia	25 June	Three races	Bryce Washington	Porsche 911 GT3 Cup Car Type 996
6	Phillip Island Grand Prix Circuit	Victoria	20 August	One race	D'Arcy Russell	Dodge Viper GTS ACR
7	Queensland Raceway	Queensland	3 September	One race	Sven Burchartz	Porsche 911 GT3 Type 997
8	Eastern Creek International Raceway	New South Wales	26 November	Two races	David Wall	Porsche 911 GT3 RSR Type 996

== Points system ==
Three championship points were awarded to the fastest qualifier for each round. For rounds composed of three races, points were awarded on a 38-32-28-25-23-21-19-18-17-16-15-14-13-12-11-10-9-8-7-6-5-4-3-2-1 to the first 25 finishers in each race. All other rounds attracted the same total number of points regardless of the number of races.

== Championship results ==
Position	Driver	No.	Car	Entrant	Wak	Mou	Ora	Phi	Mal	Phi	Que	Eas	Total
1	Greg Crick	3	Dodge Viper GTS ACR	Crickcars.com	98	108	91	72	98	96	60	90	713
2	Bryce Washington	1 & 54	Porsche 911 GT3 Cup Car Type 996	ADRAD Radiator Experts	85	79.5	104	42	102	84	75	79.5	651
3	James Koundouris	69	Porsche 911 GT3 Cup Car Type 996	Dare Shots; Supabarn Supermarkets	76	28.5	78	84	69	30	96	63	524.5
4	Theo Koundouris	19	Porsche 911 GT3 Cup Car Type 996	Dare Shots; Supabarn Supermarkets	74	57	55	-	79	75	84	63	487
5	Sven Burchartz	90	Porsche 911 GT3 Type 996	Cargraphic AG	32	18	-	63	57	69	114	85.5	438.5
6	David Wall	38	Porsche 911 GT3 RSR Type 996	RDS	32	37.5	63	-	80	33	-	117	362.5
7	John Teulan	88	Ferrari 360 Challenge; Ferrari F430 Challenge	Industry Central - Stahlwille	47	48	61	77	-	48	48	19.5	348.5
8	Max Twigg	18 & 17	Porsche 911 GT3 Type 996	Twigg Waste Management; Luxton Plan	45	33	51	14	37	57	-	66	303
9	D'Arcy Russell	7	Dodge Viper GTS ACR	Dupont	34	31.5	-	23	-	117	-	60	265.5
10	David Reynolds	6 & 90	Porsche 911 GT3 Cup Car Type 996; Porsche 911 GT3 Type 996	Bob Jane T-marts; Cargraphics	-	90	-	-	-	69	-	85.5	244.5
11	Allan Simonsen	4	Ferrari 360 GT; Porsche 911 GT3 Cup Car Type 996	Consolidated Chemical Company; Dare Shots; Supabarn Supermarkets	104	-	-	102	-	30	-	-	236
12	Paul Bolinowsky	45	Porsche 911 GT3 Type 996	Bolin Racing	24	30	-	-	-	42	54	45	195
13	Dave Stevens	43	Porsche 911 GT3 Cup Car Type 996; Ferrari F430 Challenge	Bennanit; Secure Telecom	-	37.5	-	45	72	36	-	-	190.5
14	Paul Tressider	23	Porsche 911 GT3 Cup Car Type 996	Wynn Tressider Management	29	22.5	49	-	-	45	-	43.5	189
15	Mark Eddy	12	Porsche 911 GT3R Type 996	Quarterback Shirts	41	15	-	-	-	63	-	52.5	171.5
16	Damien Flack	55	Porsche 911 GT3 Cup Car Type 996	Roock	-	-	69	12	-	54	-	25.5	160.5
17	Matthew Turnbull	13	Porsche 911 GT3 Cup Car Type 996	PROMAT	43	49.5	38	-	27	-	-	-	157.5
18	Bill Pye	44	Porsche 911 GT3 Cup Car Type 996	AutoHaus Hamilton; Property Solutions Group	-	58.5	-	-	-	39	-	43.5	141
19	Anthony Skinner	46	Porsche 911 GT3 Type 996	Travelplan Ski Holiday	52	18	-	-	-	-	69	-	139
20	Andrew Luxton	17 & 18	Porsche 911 GT3 Cup Car Type 996	Luxton Plant; Twigg Waste Management	-	-	-	-	-	57	-	66	123
21	John Kaias	77	Porsche 911 GT3 Cup Car Type 996	ABCOR; Preston General Engine	53	25.5	-	42	-	-	-	-	120.5
22	Ian Palmer	20	Honda NSX	Instant Fountains; Paluky Ho	25	-	33	53	-	-	-	-	111
23	Ross Lilley	51	Porsche 911 GT3 Cup Car Type 996	Koala Furniture International	29	36	-	-	46	-	-	-	111
24	Kevin Miller	2	Ferrari F430	Property Solutions Group	-	-	-	-	-	-	63	36	99
25	Shaun Juniper	30	Porsche 911 GT3 Cup Car Type 996	Juniper Racing	-	-	-	-	43	51	-	-	94
26	Peter Hackett	5	Lamborghini Diablo GTR	Team Lamborghini Australia	-	91.5	-	-	-	-	-	-	91.5
27	Marc Cini	9	Porsche 911 GT3 Cup Car Type 996	Hallmarc	-	45	-	-	-	-	-	42	87
28	Graeme Cook	91	Porsche 911 GT3 Cup Car Type 996	Container Solutions	27	-	-	-	58	-	-	-	85
29	Ash Samadi	55	Porsche 911 GT3 Cup Car Type 996	Rook	54	-	-	-	-	-	-	25.5	79.5
30	Greg Ward	14	Porsche 911 GT3 Cup Car Type 996	Greg Ward	-	-	-	48	-	-	-	30	78
31	Peter Lucas	99	Lotus Elise Motorsport 200	Urban Developments	10	-	-	-	42	-	-	24	76
32	Stuart Kostera	70	Porsche 911 GT3 Cup Car Type 996	PHR Scuderia	-	-	-	73	-	-	-	-	73
33	Paul Ryan	22	Lotus Exige	Steel Force; Choice Petroleum	-	-	-	-	-	-	45	27	72
34	Justin Levis	78	Lotus Elise Motorsport 200; Porsche 911 GT3 Cup Car Type 996	CUE; AutoHaus Hamilton	-	24	-	-	-	39	-	-	63
35	Dean Lindstrom	7	Dodge Viper GTS ACR	Dupont	-	-	-	-	-	-	-	60	60
36	Maher Algadri	70	Porsche 911 GT3 Cup Car Type 996	PHR Scuderia	-	-	51	-	-	-	-	-	51
37	Andre Morriss	6	Lotus Exige	Witches Chase Cheese Co	-	-	-	-	-	-	42	9	51
38	Paul Pizzati	45	Porsche 911 GT3 Type 996	Bolin Racing	-	-	-	-	-	-	-	45	45
39	Neil Bryson	25	Ferrari 360 Challenge	Betterdeal.com.au	-	-	-	18	25	-	-	-	43
40	Christian D'Agostin	45	Porsche 911 GT3 Type 996	Bolin Racing	-	-	-	-	-	42	-	-	42
41	Dean Fiore	9	Porsche 911 GT3 Cup Car Type 996	Hallmarc	-	-	-	-	-	-	-	42	42
42	Blake Lynn	32	Porsche 911 GT3 Type 996	Lynn Building Supplies	-	-	-	-	-	-	-	36	36
43	Malcolm Lynn	32	Porsche 911 GT3 Type 996	Lynn Building Supplies	-	-	-	-	-	-	-	36	36
44	Claude Giorgi	29	Porsche 911 GT3 Cup Car Type 996	Buildwise	-	-	-	-	32	-	-	-	32
45	David Giugni	14	Porsche 911 GT3 Cup Car Type 996	Ech Ridge Wines	-	-	-	-	-	-	-	30	30
46	Garth Rainsbury	66	Ferrari 360 Challenge	Speed Energy Drink	24	-	-	-	-	-	-	-	24
47	Scott Bargwanna	99	Lotus Elise Motorsport 200	Urban Developments	-	-	-	-	-	-	-	24	24
48	Tim Poulton	56	Lotus Exige	Urban Arrangement	-	-	-	-	-	-	-	13.5	13.5
49	Angela Coradine	86	Lotus Elise	Urban Arrangement	-	-	-	-	-	-	-	12	12
50	Glenn Townsend	86	Lotus Elise	Urban Arrangement	-	-	-	-	-	-	-	12	12
51	Andrew Fisher	6	Lotus Exige	Witches Chase Cheese Co	-	-	-	-	-	-	-	9	9
52	Geoff Munday	10	Ford Mustang	Jim Beam Racing	8	-	-	-	-	-	-	-	8

Note: Total points scored and championship positions attained have been adjusted to override points summation errors in the published results retrieved from www.gtchampionship.com.au
