= 2007 Australian GT Championship =

Motor racing competition

Seasons
- ← 2006 2008 →

The 2007 Australian GT Championship was a CAMS sanctioned Australian motor racing championship open to closed production based sports cars as approved for FIA GT3 competition and to similar cars as approved by CAMS. The championship began on 3 February 2007 at Eastern Creek Raceway and ended on 9 December at Sandown Raceway after eight rounds held across five states. It was the eleventh Australian GT Championship.

The championship was won by Danish driver Allan Simonsen who drove a Ferrari 360 GT owned by Ted Huglin in the first four rounds and a Ferrari F430, newly imported by Mark Coffey Racing, in the last four rounds.

== Teams and drivers ==
The following drivers competed in the 2007 Australian GT Championship.

Team	Car	No	Driver
Property Solutions Group	Ferrari F430	2	(Australia) Kevin Miller
Consolidated Chemical Company	Ferrari 360 GT	4	(Denmark) Allan Simonsen (New Zealand) Craig Baird (Australia) Ted Huglin (New Zealand) Andy Knight
Lamborghini Australia	Lamborghini Diablo GTR	5	(Australia) Peter Hackett
Lamborghini Australia	Lamborghini Gallardo	5	(Australia) John Bowe
Abcor; Preston General Engineering	Aston Martin DBRS9	7	(Australia) John Kaias (Australia) Will Davison
Abcor; Preston General Engineering	Porsche 911 GT3 Cup Type 997	77	(Australia) John Kaias
Flash Air; Daikin Air Conditioninh	Porsche 911 GT3-RSR Type 996	8	(Australia) Simon Middleton (Australia) Peter Hill
Hallmarc	Porsche 911 GT3 Cup Type 996	9	(Australia) Marc Cini
Supaloc	Porsche 911 GT3 Cup Type 996	10	(Australia) Gary Dann
Taplin Real Estate; ANZ Banking	Porsche 911 GT3 Type 996	11	(Australia) Andrew Taplin (Australia) Dean Evans
Quarterback Shirts	Ferrari 360 Challenge	12	(Australia) Mark Eddy (Australia) Dean Grant
Promat	Porsche 911 GT3 Cup Type 996	13	(Australia) Matthew Turnbull
Echo Ridges Wines	Porsche 911 GT3 Cup Type 996	14	(Australia) Greg Ward Jr.
Twigg Waste Management	Porsche 911 GT3 Cup Type 996	18	(Australia) Max Twigg
Nexus Cleaning; Roock	Porsche 911 GT3 Cup Type 996	19	(Australia) Damien Flack (Australia) Ash Samadhi (Australia) Marc Cini
Palmer Steel Industries	Lamborghini Gallardo	20	(Australia) Ian Palmer (Australia) Paul Stokell
Sherrin Motorsport P/L	Porsche 911 GT3 Cup Type 996	21	(Australia) Iain Sherrin
Sherrin Motorsport P/L	Porsche 911 GT3 Cup Type 996	27	(Australia) Grant Sherrin
Pelorus Property Group	Porsche 911 GT3 Cup Type 996	23	(Australia) Paul Tresidder (Australia) Max Twigg
Audi Centre Melbourne	Ferrari F430	29	(Indonesia) Maher Algadrie
WTF Motorsport	Porsche 911 GT3 Cup Type 996	31	(Australia) Jon Trende
Lynns Building Materials	Porsche 911 GT3 Type 996	32	(Australia) Blake Lynn
Kirchner Constructions	Porsche 911 GT3 Cup Type 996	33	(Australia) Fraser Kirchner
Jaylec; Buzza Auto Electrics	Porsche 911 GT3 Cup Type 996	36	(Australia) Peter Fountas (Australia) Matthew Coleman (Australia) Garth Rainsbury
RDS - Wall Racing Pty Ltd	Porsche 911 GT3-RSR Type 996	38	(Australia) David Wall (Australia) Des Wall
Sedgman Limited	Porsche 911 GT3 Type 996	40	(Australia) Russell Kempnich
Brennan IT; Securetel	Ferrari F430	43	(Australia) David Stevens (Australia) Hector Lester
Autohaus Hamilton	Porsche 911 GT3 Cup Type 996	44	(Australia) Bill Pye
Bolin Racing	Porsche 911 GT3 Type 996	45	(Australia) Paul Bolinowsky
Travelplan	Porsche 911 GT3 Type 996	46	(Australia) Anthony Skinner
Koala Furniture	Porsche 911 GT3 Cup Type 996	51	(Australia) Ross Lilley
Koala Furniture	Ferrari 360 GT	95	(Australia) Ross Lilley
Natrad Radiators & Auto Air	Porsche 911 GT3 Cup Type 996; Lamborghini Gallardo	54	(Australia) Bryce Washington (Australia) Michael Trimble
Data Recovery Systems P/L	Lotus Elise	73	(Australia) Eric Northwood
Bicycle Express	Porsche 911 Type 964	74	(Australia) Keith Wong
The Oxford Tavern Wollongong	Porsche 911 GT3 Cup Type 996	77	(Australia) Anthony Kosseris (Australia) Matt Hunt
Cue	Lotus Elise	78	(Australia) Justin Levis
Sirena Racing	Ferrari F430	80	(Denmark) Allan Simonsen (Australia) Tim Leahey
Urban Arrangements	Lotus Elise	86	(Australia) Scott Bargwanna
Urban Arrangements	Lotus Elise	99	(Australia) Peter Lucas (Australia) Scott Bargwanna
Industry Central; Stahlwille	Ferrari F430	88	(Australia) John Teulan (Australia) Steven Johnson
Sonic Motor Racing; Macpherson & Kelley Lawyers	Porsche 911 GT3 Type 996	90	(Australia) Sven Burchartz (Australia) Jon Trende (Australia) Dean Fiore
Cooks Construction	Porsche 911 GT3 Cup Type 996	91	(Australia) Graeme Cook
Zagame Lotus	Lotus Elise GT3	98	(Australia) Angelo Lazaris
Zagame Lotus	Lotus Exige GT3	98	(Australia) Angelo Lazaris (Australia) Warren Luff

== Calendar ==
Rd.	Race title	Circuit	Location / state	Date	Winning driver(s)	Car	Report
1	(Australia) Eastern Creek	Eastern Creek Raceway	Sydney, New South Wales	2–4 Feb	Allan Simonsen	Ferrari 360 GT	
2	(Australia) Adelaide	Adelaide Street Circuit	Adelaide, South Australia	21–24 Feb	Allan Simonsen	Ferrari 360 GT	
3	(Australia) Bathurst	Mount Panorama Circuit	Bathurst, New South Wales	5–7 Apr	Bryce Washington	Lamborghini Gallardo	
4	(Australia) Queensland Raceway	Queensland Raceway	Ipswich, Queensland	25–27 May	Bryce Washington	Lamborghini Gallardo	
5	(Australia) Phillip Island	Phillip Island Grand Prix Circuit	Phillip Island, Victoria	10–12 Aug	John Bowe	Lamborghini Gallardo	
6	(Australia) Symmons Plains	Symmons Plains Raceway	Launceston, Tasmania	31 Aug – 2 Sep	John Bowe	Lamborghini Gallardo	
7	(Australia) Oran Park	Oran Park Raceway	Sydney, New South Wales	2–4 Nov	Bryce Washington	Lamborghini Gallardo	
8	(Australia) Sandown GT Classic	Sandown Raceway	Melbourne, Victoria	7–9 Dec	Allan Simonsen; Tim Leahey	Ferrari F430	Report

Allan Simonsen and Tim Leahey were awarded the 2007 Australian Tourist Trophy for their victory in the Sandown GT Classic.

== Points system ==
For Rounds 1, 2, 4, 5, 6 and 7, points were awarded on a 38-32-28-25-23-21-19-18-17-16-15-14-13-12-11-10-9-8-7-6-5-4-3-2-1 basis for the top 25 positions in each of the three races.
Round 3 featured only two races and points were allocated on a 57-48-42-37.5-34.5-31.5-28.5-27-25.5-24-22.5-21-19.5-18-16.5-15-13.5-12-10.5-9-7.5-6-4.5-3-1.5 basis.
Round 8 was a 500 kilometre endurance round and points were allocated on a 114-96-84-75-69-63-57-54-51-48-45-42-39-36-33-30-27-24-21-18-15-12-9-6-3 basis.
Three bonus points were allocated for pole position at each of the eight rounds.

The total for each driver was adjusted by deducting the worst round point score of those rounds which were contested. This resulted in drivers scoring zero nett points if they contested only one round.

== Championship results ==
Pos.	Driver	Car	Round 1 - Eas			Round 2 - Ade			Round 3 - Bat		Round 4 - Qld			Round 5 - Phi			Round 6 - Sym			Round 7 - Ora			Round 8 - San	Total Pts	Retained Pts
Pos.	Driver	Car	Race 1	Race 2	Race 3	Race 1	Race 2	Race 3	Race 1	Race 2	Race 1	Race 2	Race 3	Race 1	Race 2	Race 3	Race 1	Race 2	Race 3	Race 1	Race 2	Race 3	Race 1	Total Pts	Retained Pts
1	Allan Simonsen	Ferrari 360 GT; Ferrari F430	1st	1st	1st	2nd	1st	1st	3rd	3rd	2nd	3rd	4th	2nd	3rd	3rd	2nd	2nd	3rd	2nd	3rd	3rd	1st	779	695
2	Bryce Washington	Lamborghini Gallardo	3rd	2nd	3rd	14th	3rd	3rd	1st	1st	1st	1st	1st	4th	4th	9th	3rd	3rd	2nd	1st	1st	1st	Ret	662	662
3	David Wall	Porsche 911 GT3-RSR Type 996	2nd	Ret	2nd	1st	2nd	2nd	2nd	2nd	3rd	2nd	2nd	6th	7th	10th	4th	4th	1st	Ret	2nd	2nd	13th	604	565
4	Damien Flack	Porsche 911 GT3 Cup Type 996	7th	5th	7th	13th	12th	15th	5th	7th	13th	8th	17th	10th	10th	6th	5th	Ret	9th	5th	6th	4th	11th	409	371
5	Sven Burchartz	Porsche 911 GT3 Type 996	17th	Ret	DNS	6th	Ret	Ret	6th	5th	5th	5th	6th	7th	8th	5th	6th	Ret	DNS	6th	9th	7th	4th	379	370
6	Peter Lucas	Lotus Elise	8th	7th	12th	9th	7th	7th	13th	12th	6th	12th	12th	17th	11th	12th	10th	9th	8th	Ret	7th	Ret	12th	345.5	326.5
7	John Teulan	Ferrari F430	5th	4th	Ret	3rd	4th	4th	Ret	DNS	10th	15th	DNS	11th	DNS	DNS				3rd	8th	6th	3rd	319	319
8	Paul Tresidder	Porsche 911 GT3 Cup Type 996	9th	Ret	9th	10th	9th	8th	9th	Ret	11th	Ret	8th	Ret	17th	13th	7th	6th	6th	7th	10th	8th	Ret	279.5	279.5
9	Ian Palmer	Lamborghini Gallardo							4th	4th	DNS	DNS	DNS	Ret	6th	Ret	Ret	DNS	DNS	4th	5th	5th	2nd	263	263
10	Max Twigg	Porsche 911 GT3 Cup Type 996	6th	Ret	6th				8th	6th	7th	6th	5th	8th	9th	11th				Ret	4th	DNS	Ret	238.5	238.5
11	Jon Trende	Porsche 911 GT3 Cup Type 996	14th	12th	11th	11th	18th	Ret			Ret	10th	9th	19th	DNS	DNS	11th	5th	10th				4th	233	226
12	Mark Eddy	Ferrari 360 Challenge				5th	6th	5th	DNS	Ret	8th	7th	10th	9th	Ret	7th							10th	204	204
13	Ross Lilley	Porsche 911 GT3 Cup Type 996	13th	10th	Ret	Ret	11th	12th	11th	9th				Ret	16th	16th	9th	8th	7th	10th	Ret	DNS		196	196
14	Paul Bolinowsky	Porsche 911 GT3 Type 996	12th	11th	10th				12th	10th	Ret	Ret	DNS	12th	12th	14th				8th	11th	9th		180	180
15	Peter Fountas	Porsche 911 GT3 Cup Type 996	16th	14th	14th	18th	15th	17th	17th	15th	15th	17th	14th	15th	15th	17th							9th	206	206
16	Gary Dann	Porsche 911 GT3 Cup Type 996	DNS	DNS	DNS	4th	5th	6th	10th	8th	9th	7th	7th											173	173
17	Angelo Lazaris	Lotus Elise GT3; Lotus Exige GT3									18th	16th	16th	16th	Ret	15th	8th	7th	5th	DNS	DNS	DNS	8th	163	163
18	Blake Lynn	Porsche 911 GT3 Type 996	10th	8th	8th	Ret	Ret	14th	14th	11th	12th	11th	13th											146.5	134.5
19	John Bowe	Lamborghini Gallardo												1st	1st	1st	1st	1st	4th					221	117
20	Will Davison	Aston Martin DBRS9												5th	2nd	2nd							7th	144	87
21	John Kaias	Aston Martin DBRS9	Ret	DNS	DNS	Ret	DNS	DNS			4th	4th	3rd										7th	135	78
22	Craig Baird	Ferrari 360 GT												3rd	5th	4th							Ret	76	76
23	Bill Pye	Porsche 911 GT3 Cup Type 996	4th	6th	5th				7th	DNS														97.5	69
24	Andrew Taplin	Porsche 911 GT3 Type 996				8th	Ret	Ret															6th	81	63
25	Ted Huglin	Ferrari 360 GT																		11th	12th	10th	Ret	45	45
=	Marc Cini	Porsche 911 GT3 Cup Type 996				7th	Ret	Ret															11th	64	45
27	Grant Sherrin	Porsche 911 GT3 Cup Type 996									16th	14th	11th	14th	13th	8th								80	43
28	Graeme Cook	Porsche 911 GT3 Cup Type 996				12th	10th	Ret	16th	13th														64.5	34.5
=	Anthony Skinner	Porsche 911 GT3 Type 996	Ret	9th	Ret				15th	14th														51.5	34.5
30	Simon Middleton	Porsche 911 GT3-RSR Type 996				17th	14th	13th						13th	14th	Ret							DNS	59	34
31	Russell Kempnich	Porsche 911 GT3 Type 996	15th	15th	15th						14th	18th	DNS											53	33
=	Iain Sherrin	Porsche 911 GT3 Cup Type 996									17th	13th	15th	Ret	19th	Ret								40	33
33	Fraser Kirchner	Porsche 911 GT3 Cup Type 996				19th	16th	16th	18th	16th														54	27
34	Eric Northwood	Lotus Elise							19th	17th				18th	18th	18th								48	24
-	Peter Hackett	Lamborghini Diablo GTR	Ret	3rd	4th																			53	0
-	Maher Algadrie	Ferrari F430				16th	8th	10th																44	0
-	Keith Wong	Porsche 911 Type 964				15th	13th	11th																39	0
-	Hector Lester	Ferrari F430				Ret	17th	9th																26	0
-	Justin Levis	Lotus Elise	Ret	13th	13th																			26	0
-	David Stevens	Ferrari F430	11th	DNS	DNS																			15	0
-	Kevin Miller	Ferrari F430									DNS	DNS	DNS											0	0
-	Matt Turnbull	Porsche 911 GT3 Cup				Ret	DNS	DNS	Ret	Ret														0	0
-	Greg Ward Jr.	Porsche 911 GT3 Cup Type 996				DNS	DNS	DNS												9th	Ret	DNS		17	0
-	Scott Bargwanna	Lotus Elise				DNS	DNS	DNS															12th	42	0
-	Tim Leahey	Ferrari F430																					1st	114	0
-	Paul Stokell	Lamborghini Gallardo																					2nd	96	0
-	Steven Johnson	Ferrari F430																					3rd	84	0
-	Dean Fiore	Porsche 911 GT3 Type 996																					4th	75	0
-	Anthony Kosseris	Porsche 911 GT3 Cup Type 996																					5th	69	0
-	Matt Hunt	Porsche 911 GT3 Cup Type 996																					5th	69	0
-	Dean Evans	Porsche 911 GT3 Type 996																					6th	63	0
-	Warren Luff	Lotus Exige GT3																					8th	54	0
-	Garth Rainsbury	Porsche 911 GT3 Cup Type 996																					9th	51	0
-	Matt Coleman	Porsche 911 GT3 Cup Type 996																					9th	51	0
-	Dean Grant	Ferrari 360 Challenge																					10th	48	0
-	Ash Samadi	Porsche 911 GT3 Cup Type 996																					11th	45	0
-	Des Wall	Porsche 911 GT3-RSR Type 996																					13th	39	0
-	(New Zealand) Andy Knight	Ferrari 360 GT																					Ret	0	0
-	Peter Hill	Porsche 911 GT3-RSR Type 996																					DNS	0	0
-	Michael Trimble	Lamborghini Gallardo																					Ret	0	0

Colour	Result
Gold	Winner
Silver	Second place
Bronze	Third place
Green	Points classification
Blue	Non-points classification
Blue	Non-classified finish (NC)
Purple	Retired, not classified (Ret)
Red	Did not qualify (DNQ)
Red	Did not pre-qualify (DNPQ)
Black	Disqualified (DSQ)
White	Did not start (DNS)
White	Withdrew (WD)
White	Race cancelled (C)
Blank	Did not practice (DNP)
Blank	Did not arrive (DNA)
Blank	Excluded (EX)
