= GT World Challenge Australia =

Motorsport national championship

- Category: Sports car racing
- Country: Australia
- Inaugural season: 1960
- Tyre suppliers: Pirelli
- Drivers' champion: (Australia) Broc Feeney (Australia) Brad Schumacher
- Teams' champion: (Australia) Melbourne Performance Center
- Official website: www.gt-world-challenge-australia.com

The GT World Challenge Australia, formerly known as the Australian GT Championship, is a Motorsport Australia-sanctioned national title for drivers of GT cars, held annually from 1960 to 1963, from 1982 to 1985 and from 2005. Each championship up to and including the 1963 title was contested over a single race and those after that year over a series of races. The categories which have contested the championship have not always been well defined and often have become a home for cars orphaned by category collapse or a sudden change in regulation. As of 2026, the series uses the international GT3 rules.

Since 2025, GT World Challenge has been the headline category of a national race series organised by the category promoters, SRO Motorsports Group.

== History ==
Australian GT Championship logo

=== Appendix K ===
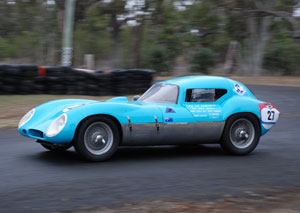
The 1962 Championship winning Centaur Waggott of John French

In the first era the championship races were open to closed roof cars (not necessarily production based) complying with CAMS Appendix K regulations. Appendix K catered for modified production Grand Touring cars (such as Lotus Elite), sports cars (such as Jaguar D-Type) fitted with roofs, specials (such as the Centaur Waggott) and touring cars modified beyond the limits of the then current Appendix J regulations. Numbers dropped rapidly away as the years went on and both the category and the championship were discontinued at the end of 1963.

=== GT and Sports Sedan ===
From 1976 to 1981 the Australian Sports Car Championship had been contested by Group D Production Sports Cars. The re-introduction of Group A Sports Cars in 1982 saw Group D needing a new home. The Australian GT Championship was re-introduced as a home for both Group D and Group B Sports Sedans of the Australian Sports Sedan Championship (ASSC). The category was something of a hybrid with European racing cars, American IMSA racers and wide variety of Australian Sports Sedans competing together. One major difference between the Sports Sedans and GT cars was that the Sports Sedans were restricted to 10" wheels where as the GT cars were allowed up to 18" of rubber. Although many of the top V8 sports sedans had similar power to the GT cars, the difference in rubber on the road saw the GT cars able to get their power to the ground much more efficiently and also go much faster through the turns.

Porsche 935's dominated early with 1980 Formula One World Champion Alan Jones winning the 1982 Championship in an entry backed by former race driver Alan Hamilton's Porsche Cars Australia (Hamilton was Australia's major Porsche distributor at the time). Porsche won again in 1983, this time with Rusty French driving the 1982 title winning car he had acquired from Hamilton, while both the 1984 and 1985 championships were won by Allan Grice and Bryan Thomson respectively, both driving the ex-Bob Jane DeKon Chevrolet Monza with a 6.0 L V8 engine that produced a reported 600 bhp (447 kW; 608 PS), with Thomson also driving his exotic Chevrolet V8 powered twin turbo Mercedes-Benz 450 SLC in the 1985 series. The Thomson Mercedes was alleged to produce over 1,000 bhp (746 kW; 1,014 PS) making it arguably the most powerful race car in Australian motor racing. The downside though was that without a large budget, the Thompson Mercedes suffered numerous reliability problems (usually turbo) and neither Thompson nor his team driver (1985–86) Brad Jones, or indeed John Bowe who had also driven the car in the early 1980s while Thompson was in a short lived retirement, were able to show its true potential.

As time went on the usually slower Sports Sedans started to usurp the category as the more expensive Sports Car refugees dropped in numbers. Sports Sedans also became more effective, especially once local racing car factories and professional racing teams like the Adelaide based Elfin Sports Cars and K&A Engineering, and top level touring car teams such as Alan Browne's Re-Car team and former ASSC Frank Gardner's JPS Team BMW became involved. As with Appendix K of the 1960s, grids were widely varied with turbocharged Porsche 935s, BMW 318is, 5.0 and 6.0 litre V8 powered Chevrolet Monzas, Holden Commodores, Alfa Romeo Alfettas, Thomson's lone Mercedes-Benz 450 SLC, Peter Fitzgerald's non-turbo Porsche Carrera RSR, a couple of V12 Jaguar XJS' and with a variety of sports sedans such as the Holden Monaro and Holden Torana, Ford Falcon and Ford Escort, and various turbocharged Toyotas, Nissans and Mazda RX-7s.

By 1985 the field was mostly Sports Sedans bolstered with recently obsolete (from the end of 1984) Group C Touring Cars and the championship was run concurrently with the Australian Sports Car Championship. Veteran driver Kevin Bartlett introduced a very quick Ground effects De Tomaso Pantera in 1985 which brought some much needed spice to the GT category.

For 1986 Sports Sedans went their own way. Within a couple of years Porsche drivers had their own series with the Porsche Cup.

=== GT3 and GT4 ===
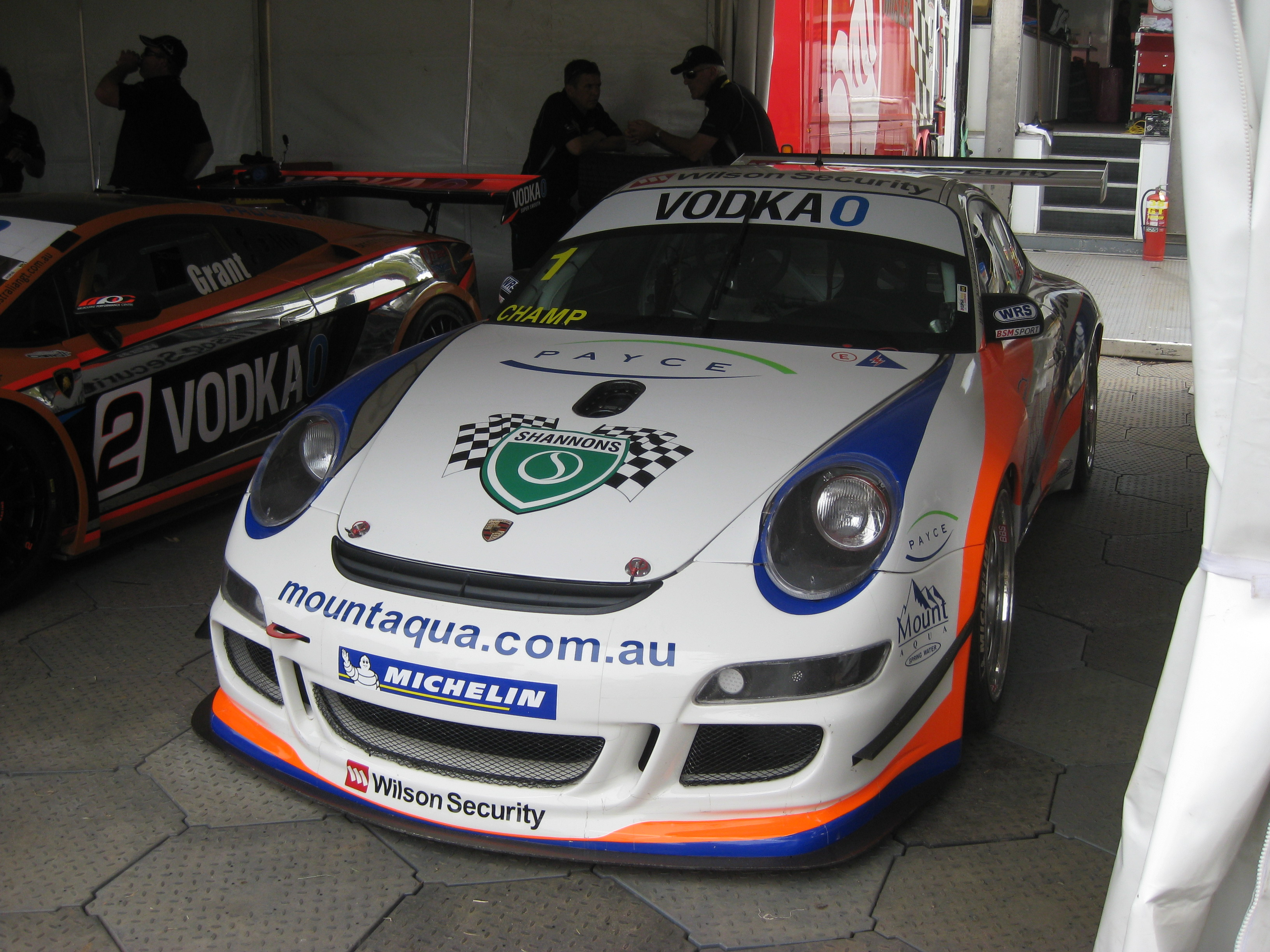
The Porsche 911 GT3 Cup Type 997 of 2009 and 2010 champion David Wall at the opening round of the 2010 Australian GT Championship.

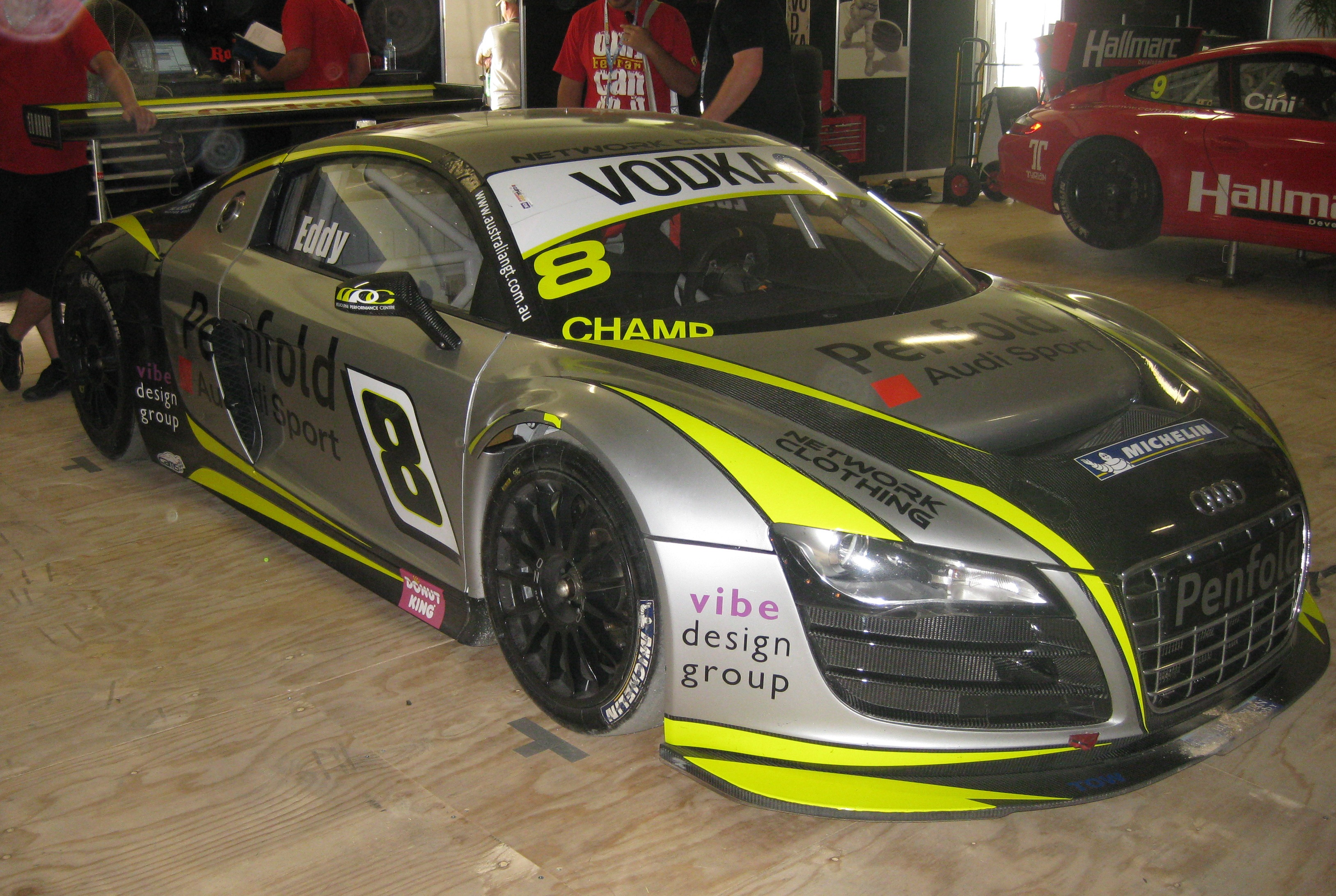
The Audi R8 LMS of 2011 champion Mark Eddy

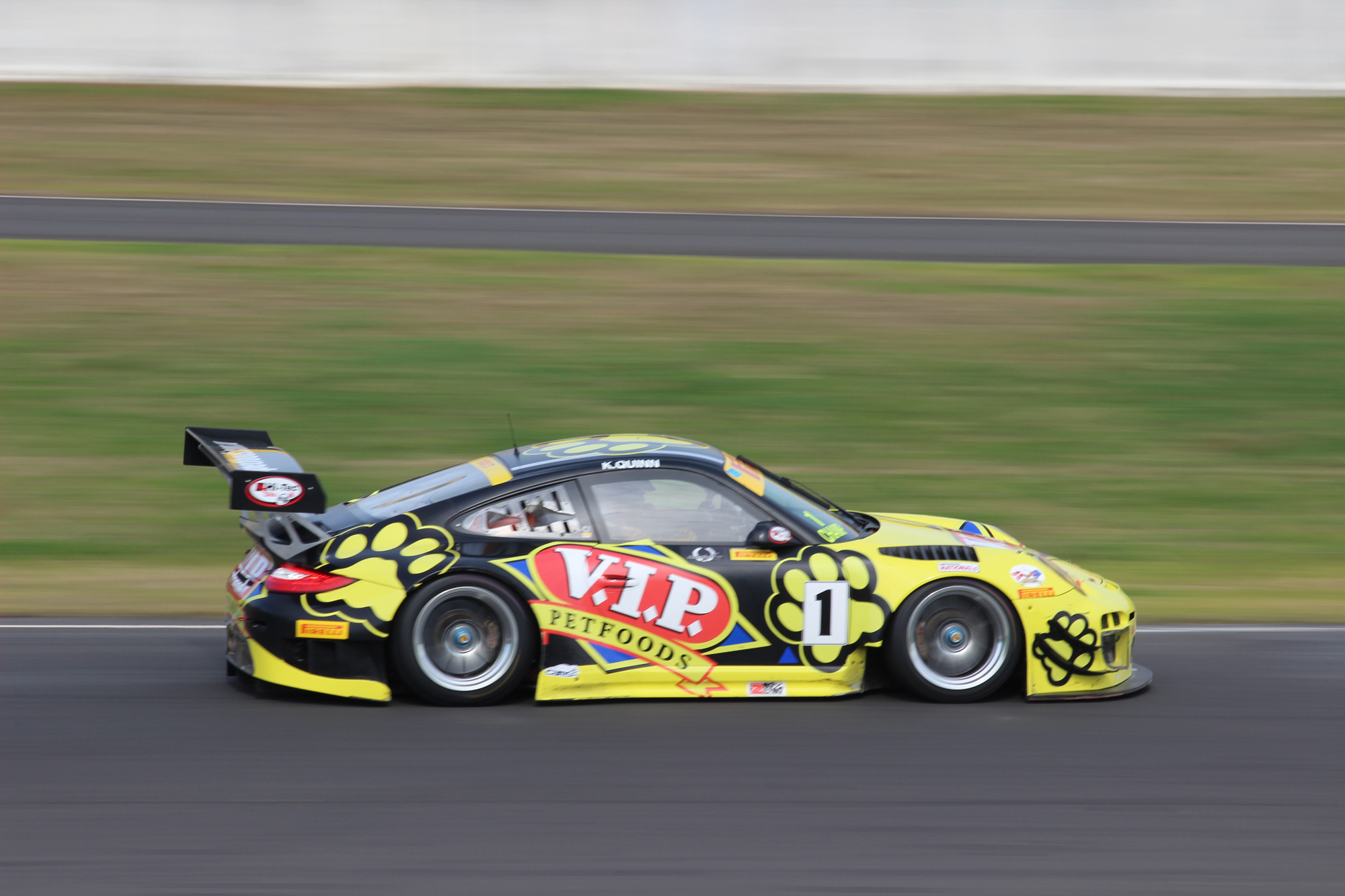
Klark Quinn won the 2013 Australian GT Championship driving a Porsche 911 GT3-R Type 997

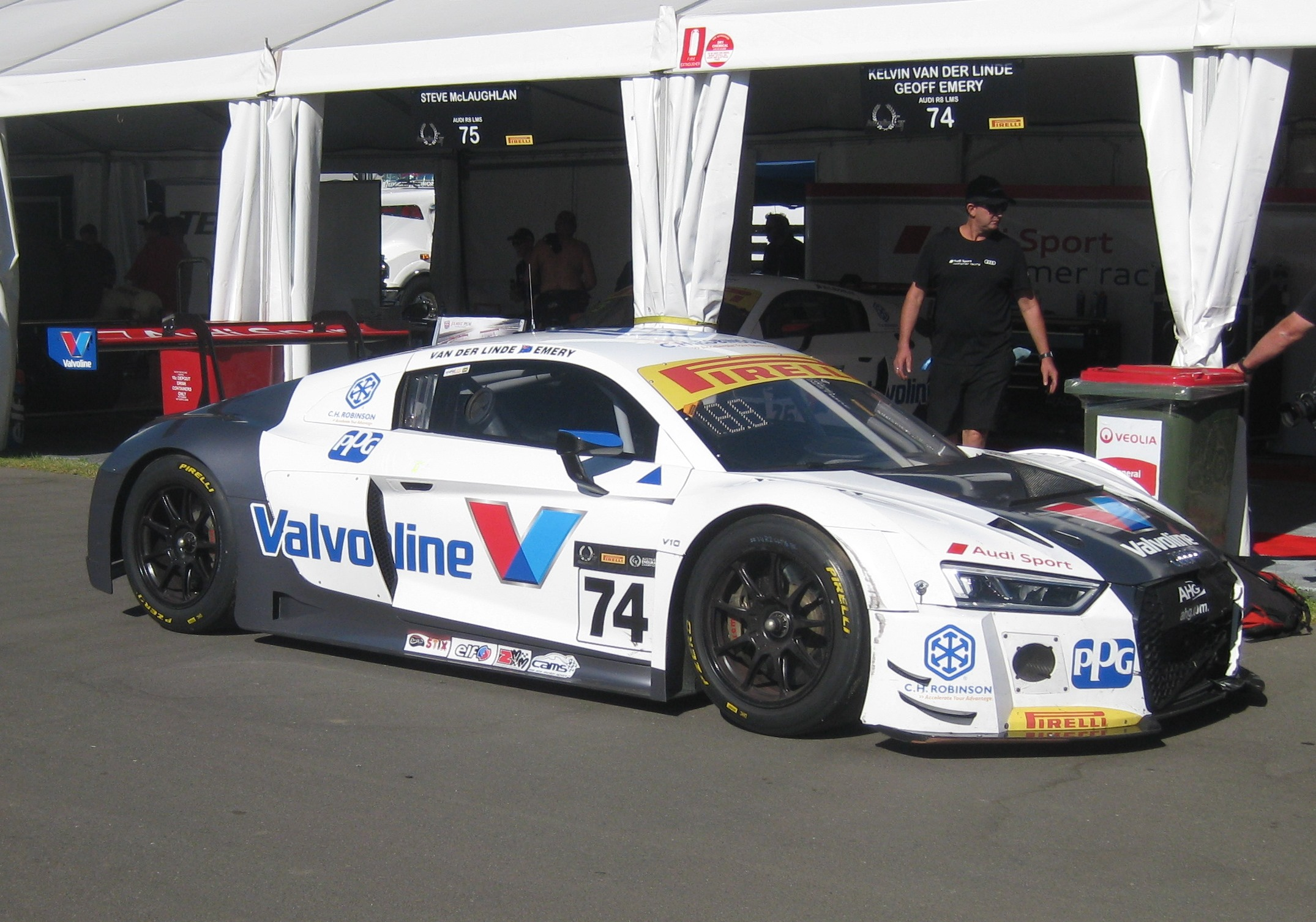
Geoff Emery won the 2017 Australian GT Championship driving an Audi R8 LMS

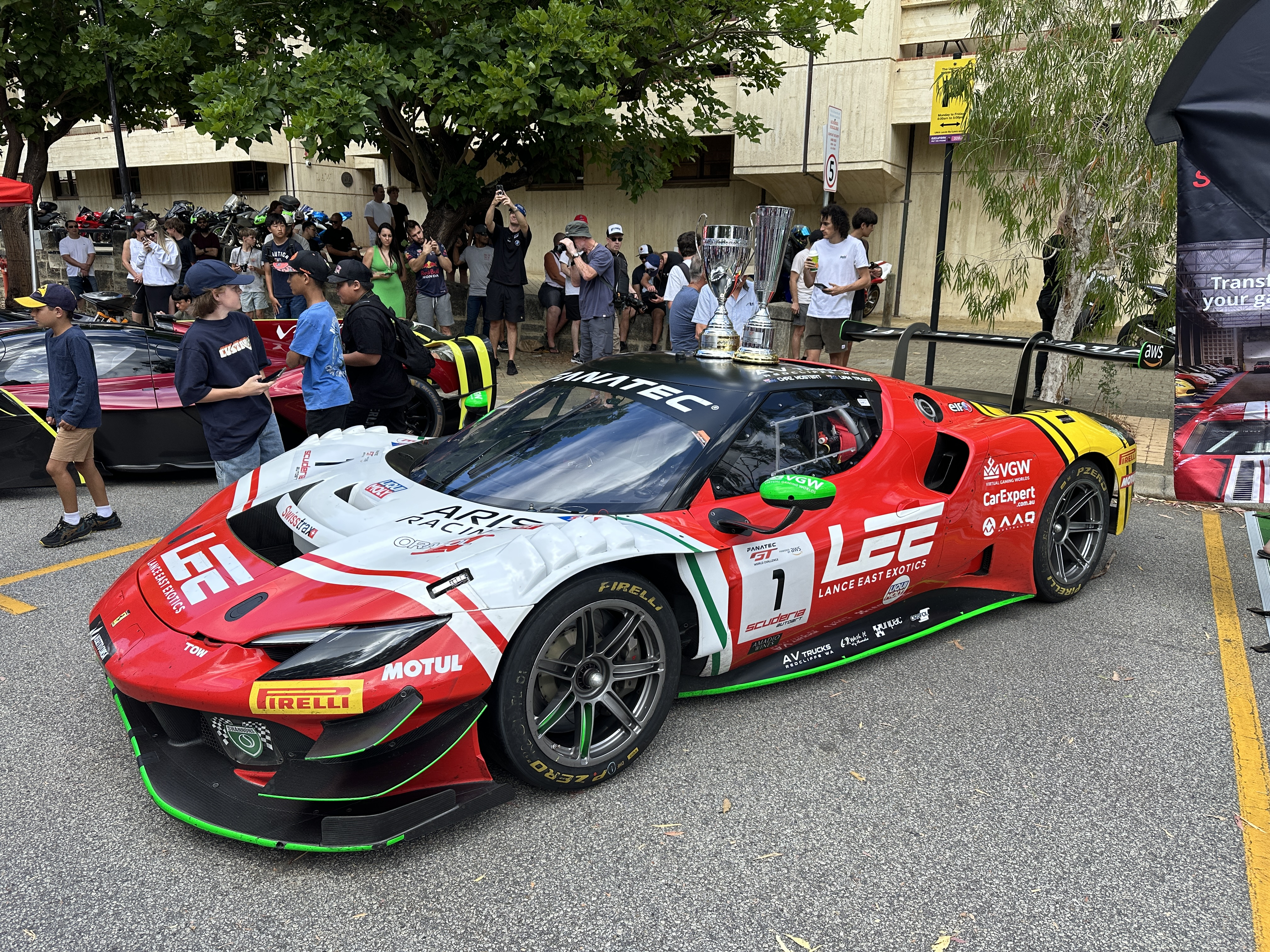
Chaz Mostert and Liam Talbot won the 2024 championship driving this Ferrari 296 GT3

The Australian GT Championship was revived a second time in 2005 after the disbandment of the Australian Nations Cup Championship. Most of the competing 2004 cars remained eligible for 2005, although the controversial Holden Monaro 427C's which had won the two Bathurst 24 Hour races in 2002 and 2003 were a notable exception. This was because the Monaros under Nations Cup rules had been permitted to use the 7.0 litre, 427 cui LS6 Chevrolet V8 engine that had been used successfully in the Chevrolet Corvette C5-R, while the road going CV8 Monaros only came with the 5.7-litre Gen III V8. The Australian Porsche Drivers Challenge (the former Australian Porsche Cup) also was merged into the GT Championship.

The FIA GT3 regulations, like those in use in the FIA GT3 European Championship was the core of the new series. The series vehicles reflected GT3, Porsches, Ferraris, Lamborghinis, the controversial Mosler, although series regulations usually specified cars be two-three years old to cut down on costs. Competing drivers are seeded and penalised so as not to flood the series with professional drivers from other categories and increasing there has been an emphasis on longer races, sometimes allowing for more than one driver per car.

The series has grown steadily, helped by the transition of the Bathurst 12 Hour race from a production car race to a GT race. Manufacturers have diversified widely from its mostly Porsche base and in addition to the 12 Hour has also seen the creation of other long-distance races, the Phillip Island 101 and the Highlands 101 in New Zealand.

The Australian GT Trophy Series was introduced as a support series in 2016, featuring older-specification GT3, GT4, Challenge and MARC cars. GT4 cars will be integrated into the main championship in 2018.

In 2020, Australian Racing Group and SRO Motorsports Group jointly took over management of the category, renamed it "GT World Challenge Australia" in alignment with their other SRO GT3 categories around the world, and ran events as part of the ARG-run SpeedSeries event series. SRO took over as exclusive organiser of the series for 2024 series. In 2024, the main World Challenge category became exclusively for SRO GT3 spec cars, with a separate set of races for GT4 known as GT4 Australia.

Since 2025, with the end of the SpeedSeries, SRO Motorsports Group has run its own event weekends for the GT World Challenge Australia, with support categories including GT4 Australia and Radical Cup Australia.

== Circuits ==
Current

Shown in current (2026) calendar order

- (Victoria (state)) Phillip Island Grand Prix Circuit (2005–2019, 2021–present)
- (South Australia) The Bend Motorsport Park (2018–2019, 2021–2022, 2024–present)
- Queensland Raceway (2005–2007, 2013, 2016–2017, 2022–present)
- (Northern Territory) Hidden Valley Raceway (2026)
- (New South Wales) Sydney Motorsport Park (2005–2015, 2018, 2020, 2023–present)
- (South Australia) Adelaide Street Circuit (2007–2013, 2015–2017, 2022–2023, 2026)

Future

- (New South Wales) Mount Panorama Circuit (1960, 2006–2007, 2009–2011, 2013, 2019–2024, 2027)

Former

In order of appearance

- (New South Wales) Warwick Farm Raceway (1961)
- (Queensland) Lakeside International Raceway (1962, 1982–1985)
- (Victoria (state)) Calder Park Raceway (1963, 1982–1985)
- (Victoria (state)) Winton Motor Raceway (1982–1985, 2011–2012, 2016–2017)
- (New South Wales) Oran Park Raceway (1982, 1985, 2006–2007)
- (South Australia) Adelaide International Raceway (1982–1985)
- (Western Australia) Wanneroo Raceway (1982, 2016–2017, 2019, 2023)
- (Queensland) Surfers Paradise International Raceway (1982–1985)
- (Tasmania) Symmons Plains Raceway (1982, 2007)
- (Tasmania) Baskerville Raceway (1982)
- (Victoria (state)) Sandown Raceway (1983–1984, 2007–2008, 2010–2011, 2014–2020, 2022, 2025)
- (New South Wales) Wakefield Park (2005–2006, 2017)
- (South Australia) Mallala Motor Sport Park (2006)
- (Victoria (state)) Albert Park Circuit (2008–2010, 2016–2019)
- (New South Wales) Homebush Street Circuit (2009, 2012)
- (Queensland) Reid Park Street Circuit (2011, 2014–2017)
- (Queensland) Surfers Paradise Street Circuit (2012, 2019)
- (New Zealand) Highlands Motorsport Park (2013–2016)
- (New Zealand) Hampton Downs Motorsport Park (2016–2018, 2025)

== Champions ==
Australian GT Championship

Season	Champion	Vehicle
1960	(Australia) Leo Geoghegan	Lotus Elite
1961	(Australia) Frank Matich	Jaguar D-Type
1962	(Australia) John French	Centaur Waggott
1963	(Australia) Bob Jane	Jaguar E-Type
1964 – 1981	Not contested	
1982	(Australia) Alan Jones	Porsche 935
1983	(Australia) Rusty French	Porsche 935
1984	(Australia) Allan Grice	Chevrolet Monza
1985	(Australia) Bryan Thomson	Chevrolet Monza; Mercedes-Benz 450 SLC
1986 – 2004	Not contested	
2005	(Australia) Bryce Washington	Porsche 911 GT3 Cup Type 996
2006	(Australia) Greg Crick	Dodge Viper GTS ACR
2007	(Denmark) Allan Simonsen	Ferrari 360 GT; Ferrari 430 GT3
2008	(Australia) Mark Eddy	Lamborghini Gallardo GT3
2009	(Australia) David Wall	Porsche 911 GT3 Cup S Type 997
2010	(Australia) David Wall	Porsche 911 GT3 Cup S Type 997
2011	(Australia) Mark Eddy	Audi R8 LMS
2012	(Australia) Klark Quinn	Porsche 911 GT3-R Type 997
2013	(Australia) Klark Quinn	Porsche 911 GT3-R Type 997
2014	(Australia) Richard Muscat	Mercedes-Benz SLS AMG
2015	(Germany) Christopher Mies	Audi R8 LMS Ultra
2016	(Australia) Klark Quinn	McLaren 650S GT3
2017	(Australia) Geoff Emery	Audi R8 LMS
2018	(Australia) Geoff Emery	Audi R8 LMS
2019	(Australia) Geoff Emery	Audi R8 LMS Evo
2020	Cancelled	

GT World Challenge Australia

Season	GT3 Pro-Am/Outright	GT3 Am	GT Trophy	GT4 Cup	Invitational Cup
2021	(Australia) Yasser Shahin	(Australia) Andrew Macpherson (Australia) William Ben Porter	(Australia) Brad Schumacher	(Australia) Mark Griffith	Not contested
2022	(Australia) Yasser Shahin	(Australia) Gary Higgon (Australia) Paul Stokell	(Australia) Michael Kokkinos	(Australia) Mark Griffith	(Australia) David Crampton (Australia) Trent Harrison
2023	(Australia) Liam Talbot	(Australia) Brad Schumacher	(Australia) Renee Gracie	(Australia) Mark Griffith	(Australia) Geoff Taunton
2024	(Australia) Chaz Mostert (Australia) Liam Talbot	(Australia) Mike Sheargold (Australia) Garth Walden	(Australia) Valentino Astuti	Not contested	
2025	(Australia) Brad Schumacher (Australia) Broc Feeney	(Australia) Renee Gracie	(Australia) Matt Stoupas (Australia) Gary Higgon	Not contested	
2026	TBD	No eligible entrants	TBD	Not contested	

== Multiple time outright winners ==
=== By driver ===
Wins	Driver	Years
3	(Australia) Klark Quinn	2012, 2013, 2016
3	(Australia) Geoff Emery	2017, 2018, 2019
2	(Australia) David Wall	2009, 2010
2	(Australia) Mark Eddy	2008, 2011
2	(Australia) Yasser Shahin	2021, 2022
2	(Australia) Liam Talbot	2023, 2024

=== By manufacturer ===
Wins	Manufacturer	Years
9	(Germany) Audi	2011, 2015, 2017, 2018, 2019, 2021, 2022, 2023, 2025
7	(Germany) Porsche	1982, 1983, 2005, 2009, 2010, 2012, 2013
2	(United Kingdom) Jaguar	1961, 1963
2	(United States) Chevrolet	1984, 1985 (Note: Bryan Thompson won the championship in 1985 driving some rounds in a Chevrolet and other rounds in a Mercedes.)
2	(Germany) Mercedes-Benz	1985, 2014
2	(Italy) Ferrari	2007, 2024

== See also ==
- Australian GT Trophy Series
- Australian Nations Cup Championship
- IMSA SportsCar Championship
- American Le Mans Series
- British GT Championship
