= 2024 24 Hours of Le Mans =

92nd edition of the endurance race

Previous: 2023	Next: 2025
Index: Races | Winners

(France) 2024 24 Hours of Le Mans
Event information
- Round 4 of 8 in the 2024 FIA World Endurance Championship
- Date: 15–16 June 2024
- Location: Le Mans, France
- Venue: Circuit de la Sarthe
- Duration: 24 Hours

Results
- Laps completed: 311
- Distance (km): 4237.542
- Distance (miles): 2633.087
- Hypercar

Pole position
- Time: 3:24.634
- Team: (Germany) Porsche Penske Motorsport
- Drivers: (France) Kévin Estre

Winners
- Team: (Italy) Ferrari AF Corse
- Drivers: (Italy) Antonio Fuoco (Spain) Miguel Molina (Denmark) Nicklas Nielsen
- LMP2

Winners
- Team: (United Kingdom) United Autosports
- Drivers: (United States) Bijoy Garg (United Kingdom) Oliver Jarvis (United States) Nolan Siegel
- LMP2 Pro-Am

Winners
- Team: (Italy) AF Corse
- Drivers: (United Kingdom) Ben Barnicoat (France) François Perrodo (Argentina) Nicolás Varrone
- LMGT3

Winners
- Team: (Germany) Manthey EMA
- Drivers: (Austria) Richard Lietz (Netherlands) Morris Schuring (Australia) Yasser Shahin

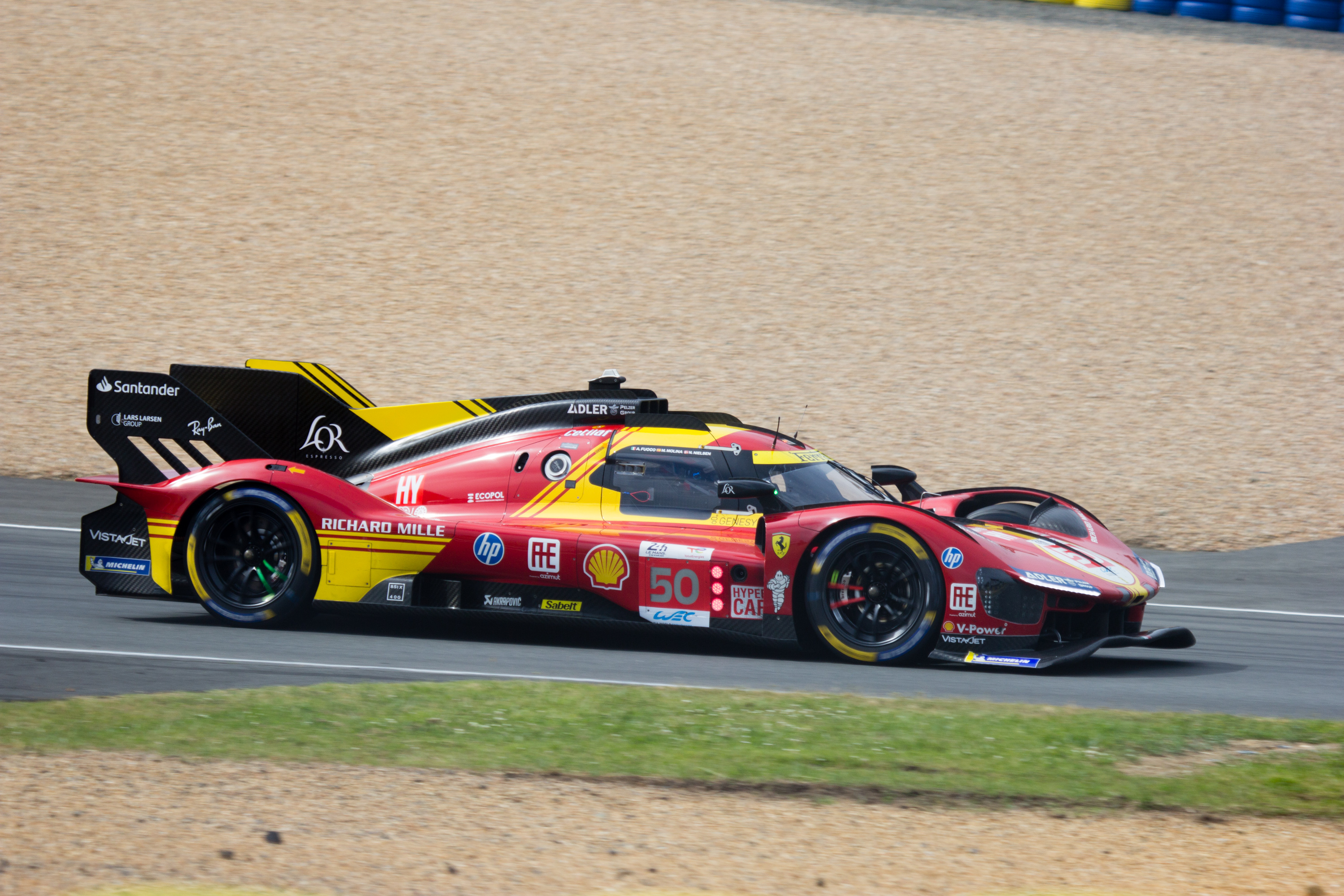
The race-winning No. 50 Ferrari 499P

The 92nd 24 Hours of Le Mans (French: 92^{e} 24 Heures du Mans) was an automobile endurance race for teams of three drivers each racing Le Mans Prototypes (LMP) and Le Mans Grand Touring Car (LMGT3) cars held from 15 to 16 June 2024 at the Circuit de la Sarthe, near Le Mans, France. The Automobile Club de l'Ouest's 92nd 24-hour race drew 329,000 spectators and was the fourth round of the 2024 FIA World Endurance Championship. There was a test day on 9 June, a week before the event.

Kévin Estre, André Lotterer and Laurens Vanthoor's Porsche 963 from Porsche Penske Motorsport started from pole position after Estre achieved the fastest overall lap time in the Le Mans Hypercar category in the Hyperpole session. Antonio Fuoco, Miguel Molina and Nicklas Nielsen's Ferrari 499P of Ferrari AF Corse took the overall victory after 311 laps. It was Fuoco, Molina, and Nielsen's first overall Le Mans victory, Ferrari's second consecutive win, and the Italian marque's 11th. Nyck de Vries, Kamui Kobayashi and José María López finished second in a Toyota GR010 Hybrid, duelling with the race winners in the final two hours. The sister Ferrari AF Corse team of James Calado, Antonio Giovinazzi and Alessandro Pier Guidi were third overall. A record number of cars, nine, finished on the lead lap.

United Autosports's Bijoy Garg, Oliver Jarvis and Nolan Siegel shared an Oreca 07-Gibson car and led the last two hours of the Le Mans Prototype 2 (LMP2) class, giving the team its second category victory after 2020. Inter Europol Competition's trio of Vladislav Lomko, Clément Novalak and Jakub Śmiechowski finished 18.6 seconds behind in second place, with IDEC Sport's Reshad de Gerus, Paul Lafargue and Job van Uitert taking third. In the first LMGT3 race at Le Mans, the Manthey EMA team of Richard Lietz, Morris Schuring and Yasser Shahin in a Porsche 911 GT3 R (992) won the category by one lap ahead over Team WRT's Augusto Farfus, Sean Gelael and Darren Leung, who shared a BMW M4 GT3.

The Porsche Penske trio of Estre, Lotterer and Vanthoor remained atop the Hypercar Drivers' Championship with 99 points; their advantage was cut to nine points by race winners Fuoco, Molina and Nielsen, who moved from fifth to second. Lietz, Shahin, Schuring became the joint leaders of the FIA Endurance Trophy for LMGT3 Drivers with Manthey PureRxcing's Klaus Bachler, Alex Malykhin and Joel Sturm. Porsche, the No. 12 Hertz Team Jota and the No. 91 Manthey EMA teams left Le Mans as the Hypercar World Endurance Championship, World Cup for Hypercar Teams and Endurance Trophy for LMGT3 Teams leaders with four races remaining in the season.

== Background ==
The Automobile Club de l'Ouest (ACO), the promoter of the 24 Hours of Le Mans endurance motor race, announced the 2024 dates in June 2023. The race took place on 15 and 16 June at the 13.626 km (8.467 mi) Circuit de la Sarthe close to the city of Le Mans in the French department of Sarthe. It was the 92nd running of the race since its inception in 1923, and the fourth round of the 2024 FIA World Endurance Championship (WEC).

Before the race, Porsche Penske Motorsport's Kévin Estre, André Lotterer and Laurens Vanthoor led the Hypercar Drivers' Championship with 74 points, 22 more than Team Jota's Callum Ilott and Will Stevens, who were six points ahead of Toyota's Mike Conway, Kamui Kobayashi and Nyck de Vries. In the FIA Endurance Trophy for LMGT3 Drivers, Manthey PureRxcing's Klaus Bachler, Alex Malykhin and Joel Sturm led Team WRT's Augusto Farfus, Sean Gelael and Darren Leung and Heart of Racing Team's Ian James, Daniel Mancinelli and Alex Riberas by 35 points each. Porsche led Toyota by 23 points in the Hypercar World Endurance Championship, Hertz Team Jota led AF Corse by nine points in the World Cup for Hypercar Teams and Manthey PureRxcing led Team WRT and Heart of Racing Team by 35 points in the Endurance Trophy for LMGT3 Teams.

== Regulation and circuit changes ==
A new Le Mans Grand Touring Car (LMGT3) category, with regulations based on the global GT3-specification of cars intended to reduce costs and ensure Le Mans was more affordable for participants, replaced the ageing Le Mans Grand Touring Endurance Am (LMGTE Am) class as the race's production-based car category. Cars were modified to comply with WEC standards, and the class follows pro-am rules, which require teams to sign at least one Bronze-rated driver and one extra Bronze or Silver-rated driver. Although the Le Mans Prototype 2 (LMP2) category was removed from the WEC due to an increase in Le Mans Hypercar (Hypercar) entrants, it was retained for Le Mans, although entries would not earn championship points because they do not compete full-time in the WEC.

Following criticism that race restarts were too protracted following the end of a safety car procedure in 2023, the system was slightly modified to remove the "drop-back" feature that combined all three classes. As a result, at a restart, all classes would be mixed together to try to avoid ending duels and shorten the procedure. To bring the race in line with the rest of the WEC season, the ACO prohibited the heating of tyres through the use of tyre warmers prior to their installation onto a car, after an exception was granted for 2023 as a result of multiple accidents at the 2023 6 Hours of Spa-Francorchamps, where several cars on cold tyres crashed in cool conditions. An exception to the tyre warmer ban was considered but not implemented.

In September 2023, the public organisation Syndicat Mixte des 24 Heures du Mans resurfaced the road between Mulsanne and Arnage corners for the first time since 2005 in order to improve technical compliance for Le Mans sports cars on the circuit.

== Entries ==
The event's registration period was from 7 December 2023 to 13 February 2024. The ACO Selection Committee issued 62 invites, with entries divided between the Hypercar, LMP2, and LMGT3 categories.

=== Automatic entries ===
Teams that won championships in the European Le Mans Series (ELMS), Asian Le Mans Series (ALMS) and GT World Challenge Europe's (GTWCE) combined Endurance and Sprint Bronze Cup championships received automatic invitations. The 2023 ELMS LMP2 championship runner-up also received an automatic invitation. Unlike previous years, Le Mans Cup entrants were not invited, while the 2023–24 ALMS LMP3 champion received a priority invitation to the Road to Le Mans support race. All current WEC full-season entries were automatically invited. The ACO selected three IMSA SportsCar Championship (IMSA) participants as automatic entries, with one invited to the Hypercar category at IMSA's discretion and the other two to the LMP2 and LMGTE classes. The ELMS LMGTE team that earned automatic entry could only enter in LMGT3 while its LMP3 champion had to enter an LMP2 car.

IInvitations were provided if the car was entered in the ALMS, ELMS, or IMSA series for 2024 and only if the entrant competed in all events in their respective championships. No competitor could accrue more than two invitations in each category combined and invitations were not transferable to another entrant. The ACO announced the full list of automatic entries on 12 February 2024. Algarve Pro Racing declined their automatic invitation as winners of the 2023–24 ALMS LMP2 category because they wanted to focus on running two cars at Le Mans and not risk compromising quality with three entries. Pure Rxcing also declined their automatic invitations for winning both the 2023 GTWCE Bronze Cup and the 2023–24 ALMS GT title. As a result, neither the ALMS runners-up in Proton Competition (LMP2) nor Triple Eight JMR (GT) received invitations.

Automatic entries for the 2024 24 Hours of Le Mans
Reason invited	Hypercar	LMP2	LMGT3
1st in the European Le Mans Series (LMP2 and LMGTE)		(Portugal) Algarve Pro Racing	(Germany) Proton Competition
2nd in the European Le Mans Series (LMP2)		(United States) United Autosports	
1st in the European Le Mans Series (LMP2 Pro-Am)		(Italy) AF Corse	
1st in the European Le Mans Series (LMP3)		(Switzerland) Cool Racing	
IMSA SportsCar Championship at-large entries	(United States) Whelen Cadillac Racing	(United States) George Kurtz	(United States) Brendan Iribe
1st in the Asian Le Mans Series (LMP2 and GT)		(Portugal) CrowdStrike Racing by APR	(Lithuania) Pure Rxcing
1st in the GT World Challenge Europe (Bronze Cup)			(Lithuania) Pure Rxcing

=== Entry list and reserves ===
The ACO announced the full 62 car entry list on 19 February 2024. In addition to the 37 guaranteed WEC entries, there were 17 ELMS entries, seven WTSC entries, no ALMS entries, and a single one-off Le Mans entry. There were 39 cars in the two Prototype classes and 23 in the LMGT3 category. There was no successful applications for the Garage 56 concept. In addition to the 62 entries invited, seven (one from Hypercar and three each from LMP2 and LMGT3) were placed on a reserve list to replace withdrawn or declined invites. Reserve entries were ordered, with the first one replacing the first withdrawal from the race, regardless of class. Entries were selected for their sporting quality, technical, fan, media and public interest and commitment, loyalty to other ACO-administered series and entrant's performance.

On May 6, 2024, a revised entry list was published with all driver lineups. The ACO did not promote any reserves for the race, which was reduced from seven to five cars after Formula Racing's Ferrari 296 GT3 and Richard Mille by TDS's Oreca 07-Gibson LMP2 car withdrew. By the start of test day, three reserves remained on the list: a second Proton Competition Porsche 963, and one Oreca LMP2 car each from Inter Europol Competition and Staysail Motorsport.

== Pre-race balance of performance changes ==
The balance of performance was changed to try to ensure parity within all three classes, and the race marked the debut of the WEC's Power Gain system, which adjusts a car's maximum power over two speed thresholds to try to create more parity. The Alpine A424, BMW M Hybrid V8, Isotta Fraschini Tipo 6 LMH-C, Toyota GR010 Hybrid were the four Hypercars with increased powerwhile Ferrari 499P, the Lamborghini SC63, the Peugeot 9X8 had their power reduced. Neither the Cadillac V-Series.R nor the Porsche 963 received any power alternations. All nine LMGT3 cars had ballast added to affect their handling. The Aston Martin Vantage AMR GT3 Evo, the Chevrolet Corvette Z06 GT3.R, the Ferrari 296 GT3, the Ford Mustang GT3, the Lexus RC F GT3 the Lamborghini Huracán GT3 Evo 2 and the Porsche 911 GT3 R (992) all received power increases to improve performance while the BMW M4 GT3 and the McLaren 720S GT3 Evo did not.

== Testing ==
All entrants were required to drive for six hours in two sessions one week before the race, on 9 June. Some teams allowed reserve drivers to test in place of regular drivers who had other obligations. Scott Dixon, Romain Grosjean, Álex Palou, Nolan Siegel and Kyffin Simpson missed testing to compete in the IndyCar Series race at Road America. Midway through the opening session, Jack Aitken, Mirko Bortolotti, René Rast, Kelvin van der Linde, Sheldon van der Linde and Marco Wittmann completed their running and left Le Mans to compete in the second Deutsche Tourenwagen Masters race at Circuit Zandvoort. Frederik Vesti only drove in the second session since he was serving as Mercedes's Formula One reserve driver at the Canadian Grand Prix.

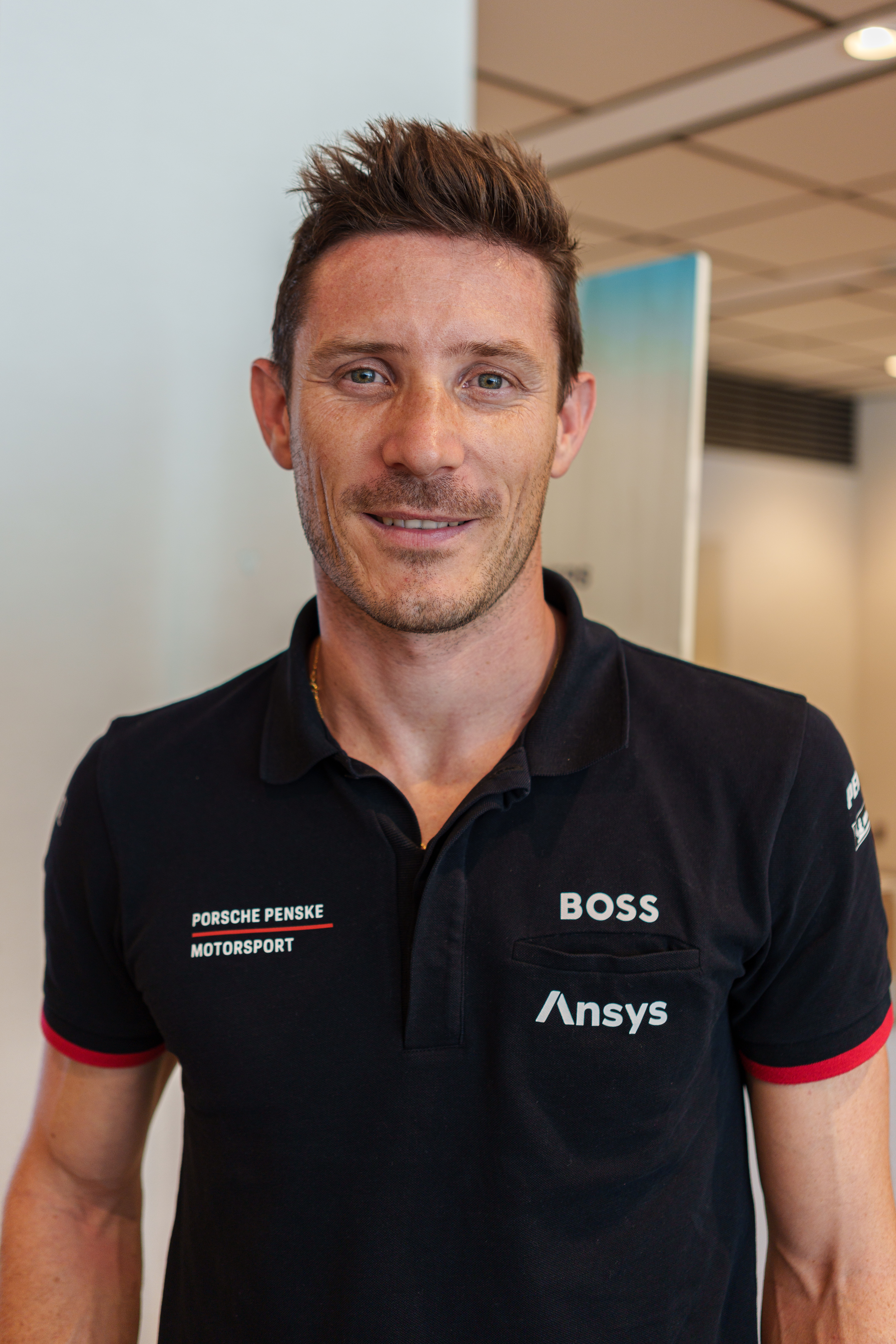
Kévin Estre set the fastest overall lap time during the test day

Testing was held in sunny weather with no rain. Toyota led the field with a 3:28.467 lap from Kobayashi's No. 7 entry set early the morning session. Estre's No. 6 Penske Porsche was second, ahead of Robin Frijns's No. 20 BMW, Bortolotti's No. 63 Iron Lynx Lamborghini and Robert Kubica's No. 83 AF Corse Ferrari. 40 minutes in, Renger van der Zande stopped the No. 3 Cadillac on the run from Mulsanne corner to Indianapolis turn due to a fuel-line failure, resulting in a 13-minute interruption in testing. Job van Uitert's No. 28 IDEC Sport car led LMP2 with a lap of 3:37.034, 0.132 seconds faster than Oliver Jarvis's No. 22 United Autosports entry. Louis Delétraz's No. 14 AO by TF car was the fastest LMP2 Pro-Am entry in third. Lorenzo Fluxá ended the session early when he crashed the No. 37 Cool Racing entry near the exit of the Porsche Curves, possibly due to a bump in the track surface in that area, with two minutes left. Fluxá was unhurt. Kelvin van der Linde, driving the No. 78 Akkodis ASP Team Lexus, led LMGT3 at 4:00.106. Esteban Masson's sister No. 87 car and Gelael's No. 31 WRT BMW were second and third in class.

Lap times improved during the second session. Estre set the early pace with a 3:27.998 lap time, but quickly improved to a 3:26.907 to finish first overall in testing. Felipe Nasr's No. 4 Penske Porsche went second in the session's final ten minutes. Third through fifth were Brendon Hartley's No. 8 Toyota, Michael Christensen's No. 5 Penske Porsche and Miguel Molina's No. 50 Ferrari. Kobayashi ran wide at the Indianapolis turn, crashing the No. 7 Toyota into the barrier with seven minutes left. Kobayashi's car needed to be recovered, so testing ended early. In LMP2, Jarvis improved the quickest class lap to 3:34.704 within the first 15 minutes. Olli Caldwell's No. 25 Algarve Pro Racing and James Allen's No. 30 Duqueine Team entries followed in second and third. Stéphane Richelmi damaged the No. 10 Vector Sport car's front-left and floor at Indianapolis corner, stopping on the inside of the circuit. The session was stopped to recover the car, which was abandoned for the rest of testing. P. J. Hyett was endeavouring to lap slower GT cars when he crashed the No. 14 AO by TF car at Indianapolis corner, prompting the safety car's deployment with 36 minutes left. Sébastien Baud set the first sub-four-minute lap in LMGT3 in the No. 82 TF Sport Corvette with a 3:59.883, 0.037 seconds faster than Riberas's 27 Heart of Racing Aston Martin.

=== After testing ===
Matteo Cairoli received a suspended 30-second stop-and-hold penalty for the rest of the event, and one penalty point on his licence, for driving in the opposite direction after spinning the No. 19 Iron Lynx Lamborghini at the exit of Arnage turn. Vesti and his team Cool Racing had to serve a five-minute stop-and-hold penalty during the first practice session for exceeding track limits in testing, but the session's early end prevented him from doing so.

== Practice ==
The first three-hour practice session happened on the afternoon of 12 June 12, in cloudy and cool weather. With 50 minutes remaining, Hartley's No. 8 Toyota set the fastest lap at 3:26.013. Ilott's No. 12 Jota Porsche was second-fastest and led most of the practice until Hartley's lap. Dries Vanthoor's No. 15 BMW was third, followed by Julien Andlauer's No. 99 Proton Porsche and De Vries's No. 7 Toyota. Alex Lynn lost control of the No. 3 Cadillac's rear at the exit to Tertre Rouge corner, crashing into the inside tyre barrier. The accident stopped practice but Lynn returned to the garage for repairs. The fastest LMP2 times were set 15 minutes into the session. Delétraz set the pace at 3:34.245 from Allen and Ben Hanley's No. 23 United Autosports USA entry. Slow zones were required when Rodrigo Sales spun the No. 65 Panis Racing car into the Dunlop Curves gravel trap, Ben Keating stopped the No. 23 United Autosports USA car in the gravel just before the Porsche Curves wall and Vesti stopped the No. 47 Cool car on the inside of the first chicane. A right-front suspension failure forced Nicolás Varrone to stop the No. 183 AF Corse car at Tertre Rouge turn. Masson led LMGT3 with a 3:57.808 time on his final lap of the session. Brendan Iribe's No. 70 Inception Racing McLaren was second and was fastest for most of the session until Masson's lap. Arnold Robin's No. 78 Akkodis ASP Lexus caused a stoppage when the car stopped at the side of the Mulsanne Straight while Michael Wainwright pulled the No. 86 GR Racing Ferrari to the side of the straight due to a complete loss of power that could not be rectified, causing a Slow Zone.

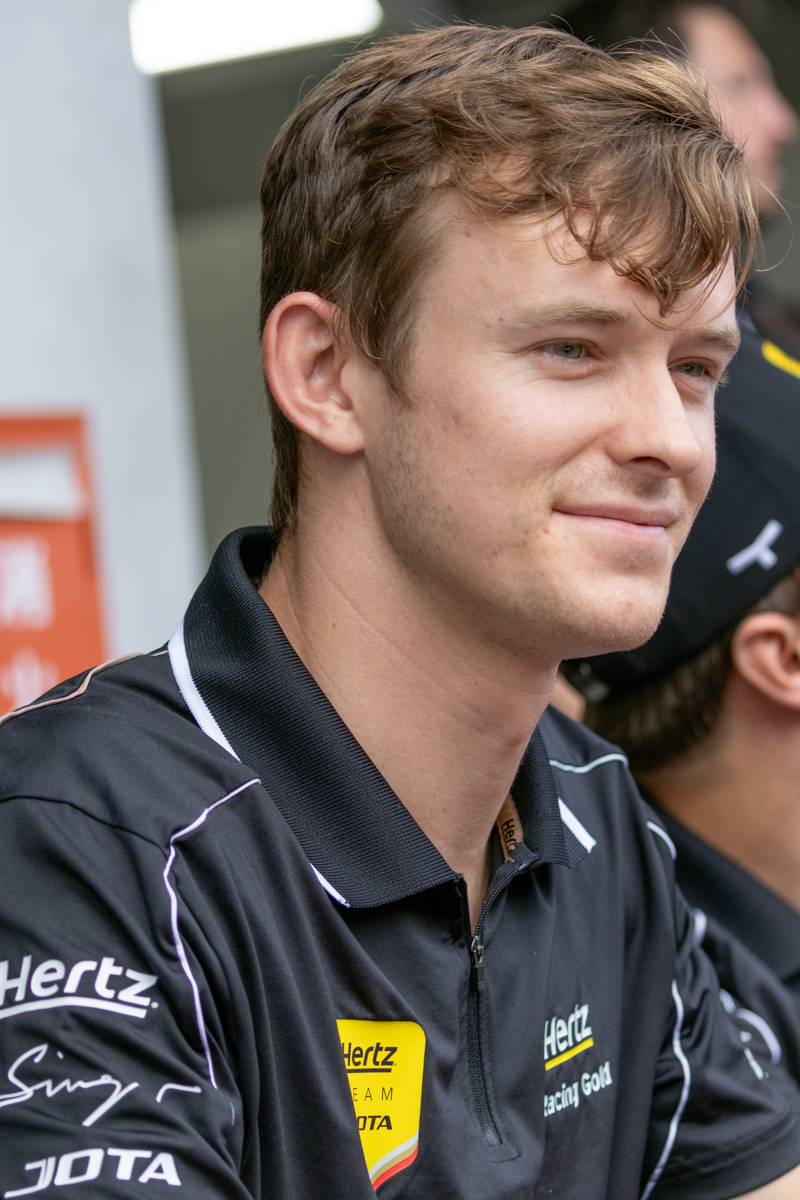
Callum Ilott damaged the tub of the No. 12 Hertz Team Jota Porsche 963 in an accident in the first practice session, leading to the chassis being replaced.

A second session, lasting two hours, followed that evening. Sébastien Buemi's No. 8 Toyota was fastest with a time of 3:27.474 set early on. Kubica's No 83 Ferrari, Estre's No. 6 Penske Porsche, Norman Nato's No. 12 Jota Porsche and Nicolas Lapierre's No. 36 Alpine were second to fifth. Dries Vanthoor mounted the kerb too hard at Indianapolis corner, crashing into the tyre barrier with less than 20 minutes remaining. He drove the No. 15 BMW to the pit lane for repairs without help. Nato's co-driver Ilott went off at Tertre Rouge corner, damaging the No. 12 Jota Porsche's chassis insert stud mounting on the bottom front-right wishbone against the barrier just before the session ended. Ilott was unhurt. Malthe Jakobsen's No. 37 Cool car led LMP2 with a 3:35.386 lap. Jakobsen demoted initial class pacesetter Jarvis to second while Scott Huffaker's No. 65 Panis entry was third. Going into Indianapolis corner, Hyett stopped the AO by TF car with a detached wheel. Four different manufacturers took the first four places in LMGTE. Dennis Olsen's No. 88 Proton Ford led the category with a 3:58.689 lap, 0.027 seconds faster than Marco Sørensen's No. 777 D'station Racing Aston Martin and Farfus's No. 31 BMW.

The No. 12 Jota Porsche's chassis was damaged beyond repair as a result of Ilott's accident, thus the team had to acquire a replacement chassis from Penske. The stewards granted Jota permission to test the new car at nearby Le Mans Arnage Airport on the evening of 14 June.

A third three-hour session was held the next afternoon in overcast weather and teams worked on racing setups and long runs. Five separate manufacturers had the first five places, with Antonio Fuoco's No. 50 Ferrari fastest with a 3:27.283 lap set when the session ended. Estre was second, with Dries Vanthoor third, and Sébastien Bourdais's No. 3 Cadillac fourth, separated by two-tenths of a second from Fuoco. Mathias Beche's No. 65 Panis car paced LMP2 with a 3:37.217 lap despite his co-drivers Sales spinning into the tyre barrier at the exit of the Ford chicane and Huffaker got stuck in the gravel trap at Indianapolis corner. Following Beche was Vesti's No. 47 Cool and Delétraz's No. 14 AO by TF entries. Grégoire Saucy's No. 59 United Autosports McLaren led LMGT3 at 3:57.558 despite co-driver James Cottingham going backwards into the barrier at Tertre Rouge corner after entering the grass. The session was stopped and the car was recovered to the pit lane. Soon later, Frederik Schandorff's No. 70 Inception McLaren stopped at the exit to Mulsanne corner with an acceleration fault. Franck Perera's No. 60 Iron Lynx Lamborghini and Daniel Serra's No. 86 GR Ferrari were second and third in class.

The last hour-long session began 30 minutes later than planned that evening owing to an accident in the Road to Le Mans support race. Rain fell on the track towards the session's end, meaning teams installed wet-weather tyres. Hartley set the fastest overall lap of 3:29.451 20 minutes in. Molina's No. 50 Ferrari was second with Sheldon van der Linde's No. 20 BMW third. Mikkel Jensen's No. 93 Peugeot was fourth with Dries Vanthoor fifth. Hanley led LMP2 with a time of 3:37.121 set in the opening minutes. Fabio Scherer's No. 24 Nielsen Racing and Siegel's No. 23 United Autosports USA entries were second and third in class. Masson led LMGTE with a 3:58.755 from Marino Sato's No. 95 United Autosports McLaren and Ben Barker's No. 77 Proton Ford.

== Qualifying ==
Divided into two sessions, an initial one-hour qualifying session decided the race's starting order, except for the fastest eight vehicles in each class, who qualified for a half-hour shootout, "Le Mans Hyperpole," which determined pole position in all three classes. Every Hypercar started upfront, regardless of lap time, followed by LMP2 and LMGT3. The eight qualifying Hyperpole cars were ordered by fastest Hyperpole-session lap time first, followed by the other non-qualifying class vehicles by fastest lap time set during the first qualifying session.

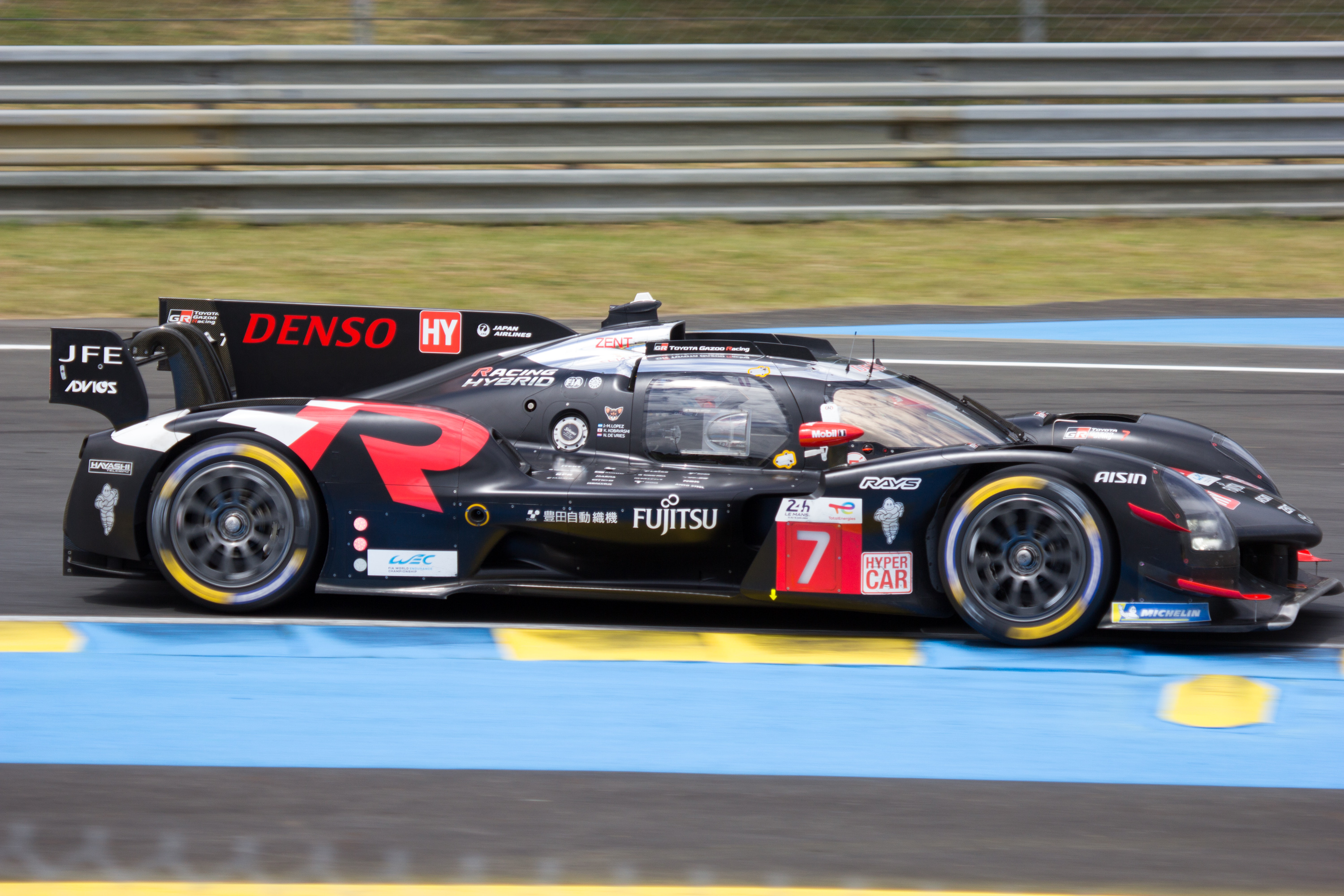
The No. 7 Toyota GR010 Hybrid had all of its lap times deleted in the first qualifying session because driver Kamui Kobayashi caused qualifying to be stopped after spinning into the gravel trap.

Heavy traffic was a factor during the session. Dries Vanthoor set the quickest Hypercar time of 3:24.465 with less than ten minutes remaining by going very fast in the last sector despite a very slow first sector. Bourdais was fastest until Vanthoor dropped him to second, while Fuoco took third. Kobayashi was fourth until race control deleted all of the No. 7 Toyota's lap times after he spun into the gravel trap at the exit of the last Porsche Curves turn (Karting) with two minutes remaining, causing qualifying to be stopped and prevented teams from doing a final run. This meant the No. 7 Toyota started from the back of the Hypercar grid. Paul-Loup Chatin's No. 36 Alpine was moved to fourth, ahead of Lynn's repaired No. 2 Cadillac. The final three Hypercar qualifiers were Alessandro Pier Guidi's No. 51 Ferrari, Estre's No. 6 (despite an error at Mulsanne corner in the final ten minutes) Penske Porsche and Ilott's No. 12 Jota Porsche after Kobayashi's lap times were deleted. The LMP2 Hyperpole qualifiers were Jakobsen's No. 37 Cool, Delétraz's No. 14 AO by TF, Hanley's No. 23 United Autosports, Beche's No. 65 Panis, Van Utiert's No. 28 IDEC, Patrick Pilet's No. 10 Vector Sport, Laurents Hörr's No. 33 DKR Engineering and Jarvis's No. 22 United Autosport entries. In LMGT3, Barker's No. 77 Proton Ford, Schandorff's No. 70 Inception McLaren, Daniel Juncadella's No. 82 TF Corvette, Perera's No. 60 Iron Lynx Lamborghini, Bachler's No. 92 Manthey PureRxcing Porsche, Riberas's No. 27 Heart of Racing Aston Martin, Larry ten Voorde's No. 66 JMW Motorsport Ferrari and Sørensen's No. 777 D'station Aston Martin advanced to Hyperpole.

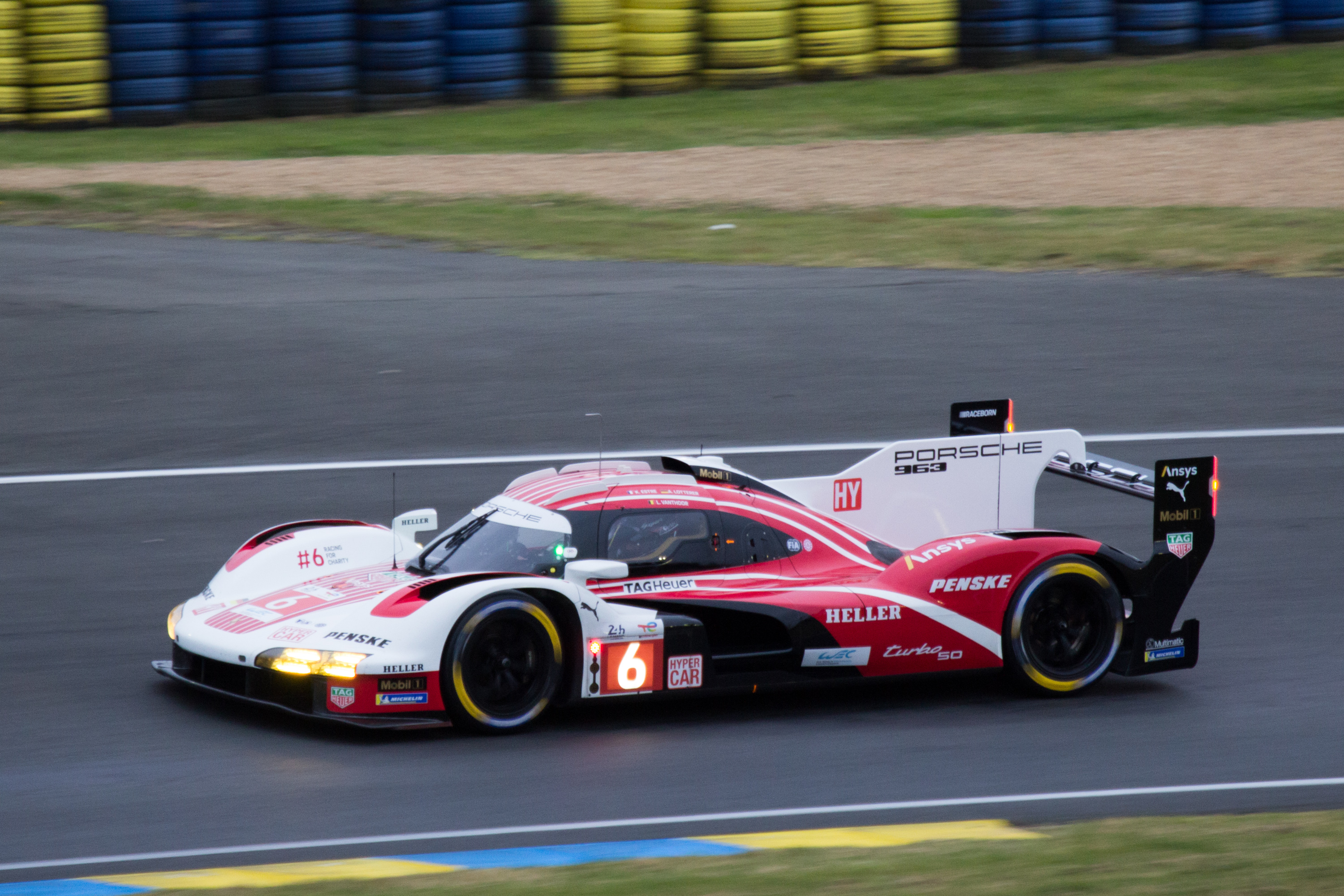
Kévin Estre secured the first pole position for Porsche at Le Mans since 2016.

The Hyperpole session began 35 minutes late due to an accident in the first Road to Le Mans support race, which damaged the Armco barrier between the Mulsanne and Indianapolis turns. When qualifying began, in dark, cloudy weather, Ferrari and Cadillac were the early pacesetters, before Estre qualified the No. 6 Penske Porsche on pole position with a 3:24.634 lap on his category's final lap of the session, having slipstreamed Delétraz's LMP2 car into Indianapolis turn to run faster and using electrical power while saving fuel. It was Porsche's first Le Mans pole since 2016 and their 19th overall. Lynn took second in the No. 2 Cadillac and held pole position until Estre's lap. His teammate Bourdais drove the sister No. 3 car to third with a lap set on his third fast lap halfway through Hyperpole. He did not set any other laps after the session was restarted following a stoppage because the halt interrupted his second run and he did not have enough fuel to return to the track. Pier Guidi was Ferrari's fastest driver, placing fourth. Fuoco's sister No. 50 entry was fifth after aborting his final run due to a mistake at the Dunlop chicane that forced him to abort a lap. Chatin's No. 36 Alpine was sixth. Dries Vanthoor on a second set of tyres understeered the No. 15 BMW heavily into the tyre wall at Indianapolis corner and Hyperpole was stopped with 7 minutes and 41 seconds left as the car needed extricating. Vanthoor's lap times were consequently invalidated. and qualifying resumed approximately 10 minutes later. The No. 12 Jota Porsche did not participate in the session as it was being rebuilt from its second practice session accident. Delétraz's No. 14 AO by TF car took the LMP2 pole with a 3:33.217 lap on his final run in his first Le Mans pole position. Van Utiert's No. 28 IDEC entry was second after battling Delétraz for pole late in Hyperpole. Following in third to fifth were Beche's No. 65 Panis car and the United Autosports pair of Hanley and Jarvis. In the first LMGT3 category qualifying session at Le Mans, Iribe drove the No. 70 Inception McLaren to the team's and marque's first pole position, lapping at 3:58.120. He tried to lap faster, but he went too fast and spun after the Ford chicane on his last quick lap. Malykhin's No. 92 Manthey Porsche secured second and Giacomo Petrobelli's No. 66 Ferrari took third.

Following Hyperpole, the No. 2 Cadillac was demoted five places on the grid due to a penalty imposed when driver Earl Bamber collided with an LMGT3-category BMW at the previous 6 Hours of Spa-Francorchamps.

=== Qualifying results ===
Pole positions in each class are denoted in bold.

Final qualifying classification
Pos	Class	No.	Team	Qualifying	Hyperpole	Grid
1	**Hypercar**	**6**	**Porsche Penske Motorsport**	3:25.051	**3:24.634**	1
2	Hypercar	2	Cadillac Racing	3:24.993	3:24.782	7 (Note: The No. 2 Cadillac Racing entry qualified second but began from seventh due to a five-place grid penalty, received after the 6 Hours of Spa-Francorchamps for a collision with an LMGT3-category car.)
3	Hypercar	3	Cadillac Racing	3:24.642	3:24.816	2
4	Hypercar	51	Ferrari AF Corse	3:25.049	3:25.156	3
5	Hypercar	50	Ferrari AF Corse	3:24.731	3:25.598	4
6	Hypercar	35	Alpine Endurance Team	3:24.872	3:25.713	5
7	Hypercar	15	BMW M Team WRT	3:24.465	No time	6
8	Hypercar	12	Hertz Team Jota	3:25.145	No time	8
9	Hypercar	36	Alpine Endurance Team	3:25.278		9
10	Hypercar	5	Porsche Penske Motorsport	3:25.307		10
11	Hypercar	8	Toyota Gazoo Racing	3:25.446		11
12	Hypercar	83	AF Corse	3:25.766		12
13	Hypercar	63	Lamborghini Iron Lynx	3:25.973		13
14	Hypercar	99	Proton Competition	3:25.992		14
15	Hypercar	93	Peugeot TotalEnergies	3:26.195		15
16	Hypercar	20	BMW M Team WRT	3:26.223		16
17	Hypercar	38	Hertz Team Jota	3:26.290		17
18	Hypercar	311	Whelen Cadillac Racing	3:26.311		18
19	Hypercar	4	Porsche Penske Motorsport	3:26.362		19
20	Hypercar	94	Peugeot TotalEnergies	3:27.251		20
21	Hypercar	19	Lamborghini Iron Lynx	3:27.655		21
22	Hypercar	11	Isotta Fraschini	3:29.865		22
23	Hypercar	7	Toyota Gazoo Racing	No time		23
24	**LMP2 Pro-Am**	**14**	**AO by TF**	3:33.134	**3:33.217**	24
25	**LMP2**	**28**	**IDEC Sport**	3:34.215	**3:33.827**	25
26	LMP2 Pro-Am	65	Panis Racing	3:33.827	3:34.053	26
27	LMP2 Pro-Am	23	United Autosports USA	3:33.430	3:34.221	27
28	LMP2	22	United Autosports	3:34.480	3:34.270	28
29	LMP2	37	Cool Racing	3:32.827	3:34.773	29
30	LMP2 Pro-Am	33	DKR Engineering	3:34.330	3:35.699	30
31	LMP2	10	Vector Sport	3:34.262	3:35.855	31
32	LMP2 Pro-Am	183	AF Corse	3:34.767		32
33	LMP2	24	Nielsen Racing	3:34.794		33
34	LMP2	34	Inter Europol Competition	3:34.885		34
35	LMP2	9	Proton Competition	3:34.963		35
36	LMP2 Pro-Am	30	Duqueine Team	3:35.070		36
37	LMP2 Pro-Am	47	Cool Racing	3:35.360		37
38	LMP2	25	Algarve Pro Racing	3:35.474		38
39	LMP2 Pro-Am	45	CrowdStrike Racing by APR	3:39.222		39
40	**LMGT3**	**70**	**Inception Racing**	3:55.406	**3:58.120**	40
41	LMGT3	92	Manthey PureRxcing	3:56.189	3:58.928	41
42	LMGT3	66	JMW Motorsport	3:56.443	3:58.938	42
43	LMGT3	77	Proton Competition	3:55.263	3:59.443	43
44	LMGT3	27	Heart of Racing Team	3:56.243	3:59.655	44
45	LMGT3	777	D'station Racing	3:56.500	4:02.787	45
46	LMGT3	82	TF Sport	3:56.105	4:03.681	46
47	LMGT3	60	Iron Lynx	3:56.153	4:06.495	47
48	LMGT3	85	Iron Dames	3:56.530		48
49	LMGT3	87	Akkodis ASP Team	3:56.561		49
50	LMGT3	59	United Autosports	3:56.710		50
51	LMGT3	46	Team WRT	3:56.738		51
52	LMGT3	54	Vista AF Corse	3:56.780		52
53	LMGT3	44	Proton Competition	3:56.836		53
54	LMGT3	31	Team WRT	3:56.947		54
55	LMGT3	91	Manthey EMA	3:57.026		55
56	LMGT3	88	Proton Competition	3:57.221		56
57	LMGT3	81	TF Sport	3:57.296		57
58	LMGT3	95	United Autosports	3:57.313		58
59	LMGT3	155	Spirit of Race	3:57.349		59
60	LMGT3	78	Akkodis ASP Team	3:57.441		60
61	LMGT3	55	Vista AF Corse	3:58.282		61
62	LMGT3	86	GR Racing	No time		62

== Warm-up ==
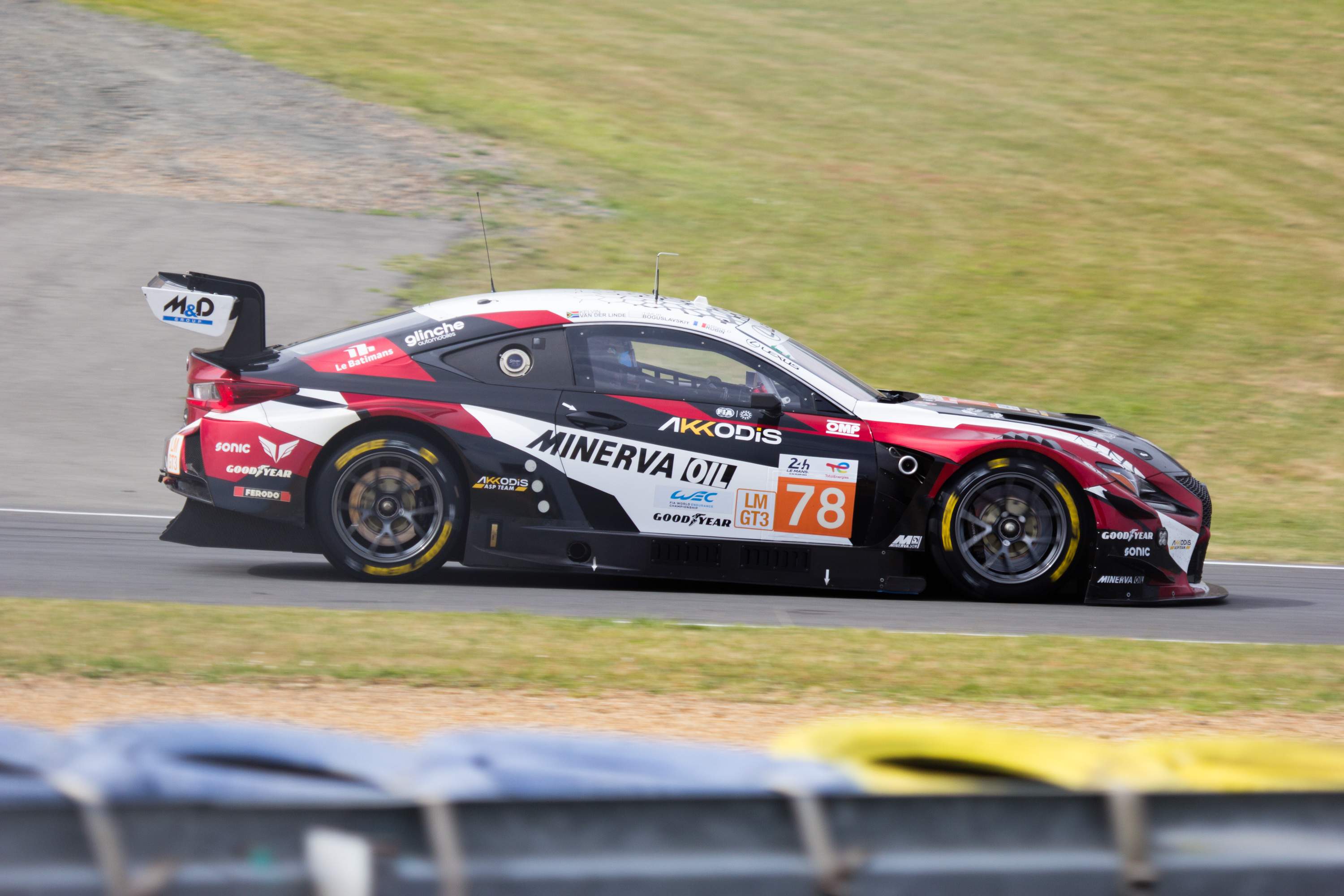
The rear of the No. 78 Akkodis ASP Team Lexus RC F GT3 was damaged by the No. 7 Toyota GR010 Hybrid in the warm-up session.

On 15 June, a 15-minute warm-up session was held at midday in overcast and cool weather with rain falling towards the end. Kubica's No. 83 Ferrari recorded the fastest lap time of 3:29.260. Antonio Giovinazzi's sister No. 51 Ferrari was second followed by Charles Milesi's No. 35 Alpine and Laurens Vanthoor's No. 6 Penske Porsche. The fastest LMP2 lap was a 3:36.884 set by Ben Barnicoat's No. 183 AF Corse entry and Serra's No. 86 GR Ferrari was quickest in LMGT3 at 3:58.198. De Vries damaged the front of the No. 7 Toyota against Kelvin van der Linde's No. 78 Akkodis ASP Lexus and half-spun after being caught out by a group of cars slowing ahead of him at the exit of the Porsche Curves. De Vries returned to the pit lane to replace the Toyota's front end. The stewards penalised Van Der Linde with a suspended stop-and-go penalty as he was judged chiefly to blame for the accident. Naveen Rao's No. 47 Cool LMP2 car and Bourdais' No. 3 Cadillac collided at the first Mulsanne Straight chicane, although both drivers continued.

== Race ==
=== Start and early hours ===
The air temperature ranged from 12.5 to 18.8 °C (54.5 to 65.8 °F), while the track temperature was 13.5 to 22.8 °C (56.3 to 73.0 °F). There were 329,000 spectators in attendance. At 16:00 Central European Summer Time, FIFA World Cup winning footballer Zinedine Zidane waved the French tricolour to begin the race, which was led by the pole-sitting Laurens Vanthoor. 62 cars were scheduled to start, but the No. 78 Akkodis Lexus began from the pit lane because it was being repaired after its warm-up accident with the No. 7 Toyota. Nielsen drove the No. 50 Ferrari from fourth to first on the first lap, while Giovinazzi's sister No. 51 car moved to second by lap four. Following the first round of pit stops, Vanthoor's No. 6 Penske Porsche reclaimed the race lead, but Nielsen retook it on the Mulsanne Straight. The No. 50 Ferrari, on the other hand, received a ten-second stop-and-go penalty at its next pit stop for releasing Nielsen into the path of Bourdais' No. 3 Cadillac in the fast lane. Bent Viscaal's No. 9 Proton car took the LMP2 class lead from Delétraz's No. 9 AO by TF car when the first hour was over after a faster pit stop since it was released with the same set of tyres as the race began.

In the second hour, a rain shower fell on areas of the circuit, causing some cars to lose grip on the wet track. Many teams chose to install wet-weather tyres on their cars and briefly lapped faster than others, while some stayed on the track because it remained mostly dry. Nielsen's and Kubica's No. 50 and 83 Ferraris battled for the race lead, exchanging places until Nielsen was able to go ahead when Kubica was delayed by slower cars leaving Tertre Rouge corner. Ten Voorde's No. 66 JMW Ferrari was the fastest in LMGT3 at the time, taking the lead from Christopher Mies's No. 44 Proton Ford. In the third hour, Thomas Flohr lost control of the rear of the No. 54 AF Corse Ferrari and struck the outside barriers at the Dunlop chicane. Flohr was unhurt, however the car was retired due to excessive damage. As a result, a slow zone was enforced, and the subsequent pit stop cycle moved Robert Shwartzman's No. 83 Ferrari to the race lead, gradually pulling away from Christensen's No. 5 Penske Porsche. Clément Novalak's No. 34 Inter Europol vehicle and Ryan Cullen's No. 10 Vector car battled for the LMP2 lead during the pit stop cycle after both cars were not taken into the pit lane for wet-weather tyres, gaining significant time as a result.

The LMGT3 lead also became a battle between Masson's No. 87 Akkodis Lexus, Morris Schuring and later Richard Lietz's No. 91 Manthey EMA Porsche, Valentino Rossi and Ahmad Al Harthy's No. 46 WRT BMW and Malykhin's No. 92 Manthey PureRxcing as different teams opted to run Bronze-rated drivers at certain points and run tyres for two stints. Novalak's No. 34 Inter Europol car was forced to enter the pit lane slowly due to a detached left front wheel, and it dropped off the LMP2 lead lap during the fourth hour. Ferdinand Habsburg pulled the No. 35 Alpine to the side of the track in the run-off area near the exit of Arnage corner in the fifth hour, with smoke billowing from the car's rear. Cool Racing's No. 37 entry and Richelmi's No. 10 Vector car traded the lead in LMP2 between pit stops because to the amount of time Vector had lost changing tyres until Cool driver Ritomo Miyata was relieved by Fluxá. Lapierre brought the No. 36 Alpine into the garage, and it was retired due to a rear driveshaft problem.

=== Night to morning ===
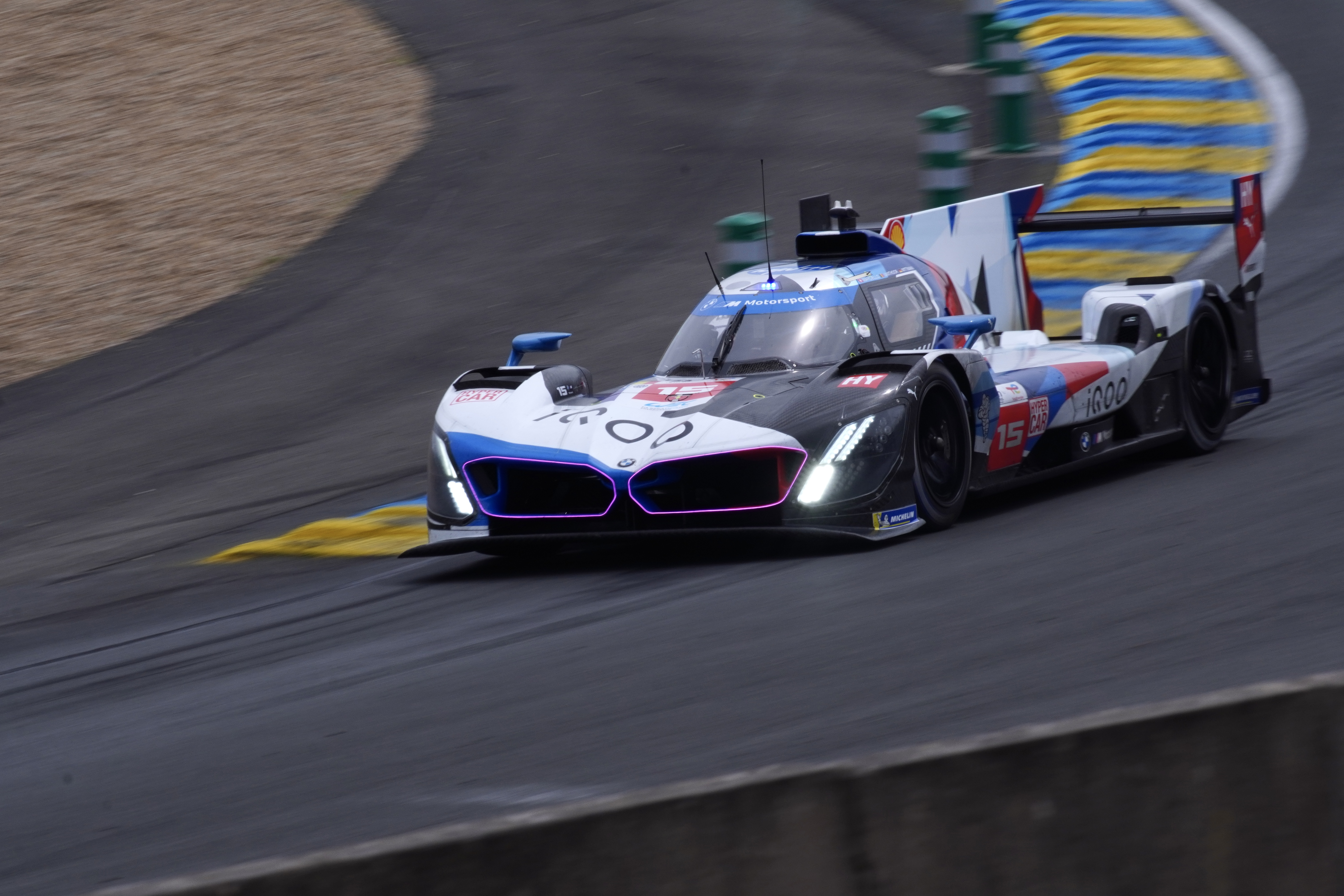
The No. 15 WRT BMW M Hybrid V8 was forced to retire because of a collision between driver Dries Vanthoor and AF Corse's Robert Kubica in the seventh hour.

As night fell, Kubica's No. 83 Ferrari was lapping Dries Vanthoor's No. 15 BMW (who had cold tyres) into Mulsanne Corner when the two cars crashed while both overtaking the slower LMGT3-category Pure Rxcing Porsche. Vanthoor collided with the outside Armco barriers, causing substantial damage to the BMW's front. The car was immediately retired and Vanthoor exited unaided but was sent to the medical centre for checks and was released after saying his left foot was in pain. Race control dispatched the safety cars for the first time in the event to clean up debris, repair the barrier and recover the damaged BMW. The stewards assessed the event and determined Kubica was at fault for the crash, imposing a 30-second stop-and-go penalty on the No. 83 Ferrari. Just as the safety cars were recalled after more than 90 minutes, rain returned to the circuit, prompting some teams to pit for wet-weather tyres in the ninth hour. Kubica took the No. 83 Ferrari's 30-second stop-and-go penalty and dropped to sixth place, promoting Hirakawa's No. 8 Toyota to the overall lead. Al Harthy's No. 46 WRT BMW collided with the tyre wall at the Forest Esses after losing control on a damp white line while on slick tyres. The car's crash and following water leak caused it to retire from the race.

The overall lead became a duel between the No. 8 Toyota and the No. 6 Penske Porsche, with both teams following each other nose to tail for several laps. Miyata's class-leading No. 37 Cool LMP2 car spun after the tenth hour began, and Pilet's No. 10 Vector entry received a drive-through penalty for a slow zone infringement caused by Salih Yoluç's No. 66 JMW Ferrari stopping at the exit to the Porsche Curves and being moved behind a wall. In the 11th hour, David Heinemeier Hansson's No. 24 Nielsen LMP2 entry attempted to pass Zacharie Robichon's No. 77 LMGT3-class Proton Ford on the inside at the Forest Esses, but both cars collided. Both went into the gravel and required extraction, leaving Nielsen's car out of contention for the LMP2 class win. These events promoted Varrone's No. 183 AF Corse car to the LMP2 class lead, with Siegel's No. 22 United car second in category. LMGT3 remained a close battle between the No. 59 United McLaren, the No. 92 Manthey PureRxing Porsche, the No. 91 Manthey Racing Porsche, and the two Akkodis Lexuses.

Rain returned to the circuit during the 12th hour, and its increasing intensity prompted the deployment of safety cars for the second time, closing the fields in all three categories. Every team thus switched to wet-weather tyres. Incessant rainfall and reduced visibility in the night forced the race director to keep the safety cars on the circuit for longer than expected but the race was not stopped. Each of the three safety cars had to be refuelled before being replaced by reserve safety cars on the start/finish straight. LMP2 and LMGT3 teams fielded Bronze or Silver-rated drivers to comply with the stipulation that they had to complete six hours of driving and plan driver deployment tactics for the remainder of the event. The brake lights of the cars ahead of them dazzled the drivers. De Vries' No. 7 Toyota was examined for rejoining behind the incorrect safety car after relieving José María López. He re-entered the pit lane to fix the error by joining behind the right line of vehicles as agreed with race control and stewards.

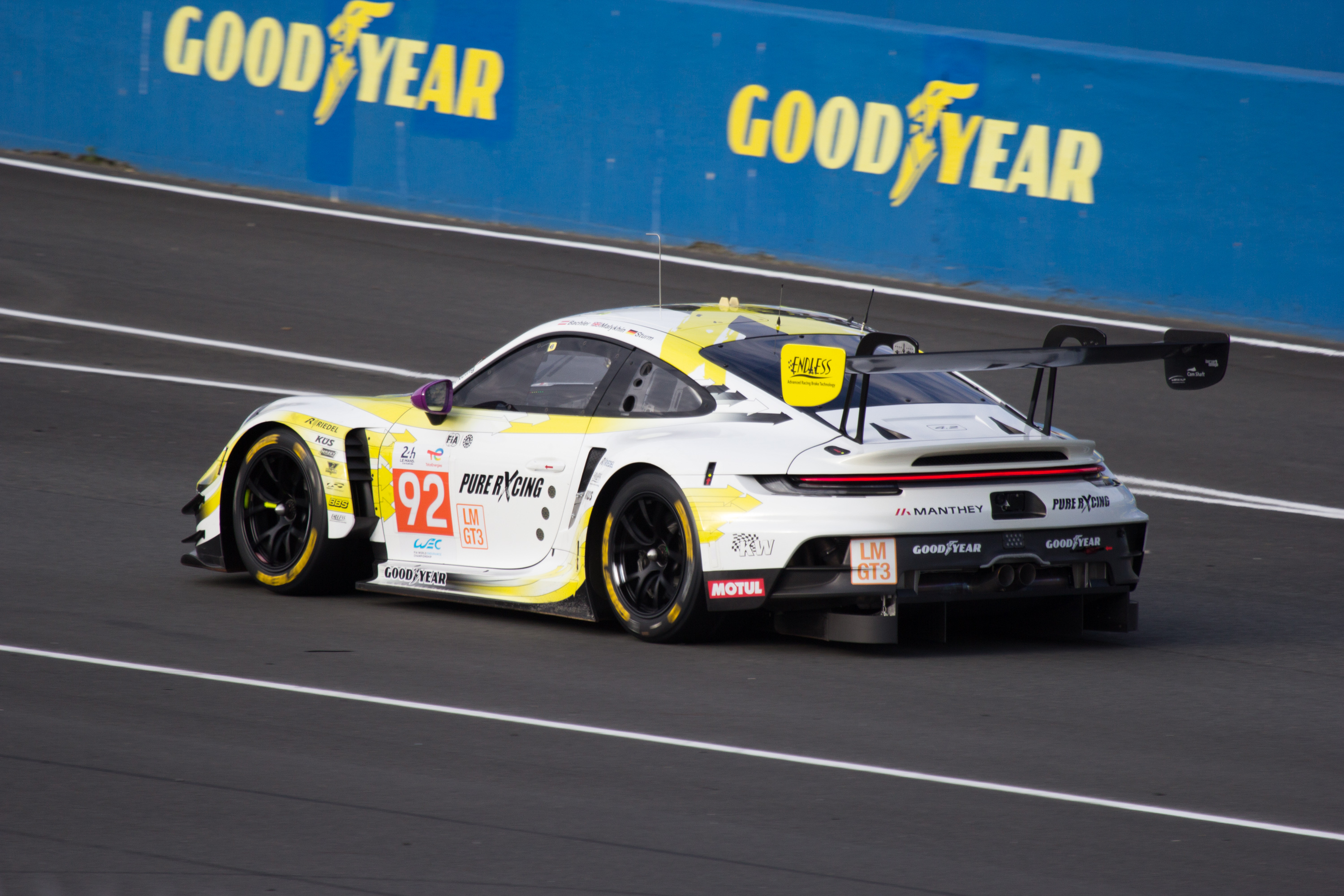
The No. 92 Manthey Pure Rxcing Porsche 911 GT3 R (992) was a contender for the LMGT3 class victory until a gear selection fault dropped it down the class order.

The safety car stint lasted four hours and 26 minutes, making it the longest single safety car deployment in race history. It also broke the race record for the most time spent behind the safety car. Bachler drove the LMGT3-leading No. 92 Manthey PureRxcing Porsche into pit lane with a gear selection issue that took 25 minutes to fix. The stop left the car five laps down in class, allowing Lietz's sister No. 91 Manthey EMA Porsche to take the lead. De Vries' No. 7 Toyota made an unscheduled pit stop due to poor visibility caused by oil on the windscreen. In the 18th hour, Nasr lost control of the No. 4 Penske Porsche and collided with the tyre barrier entering Indianapolis turn. The car was retired from the race, and a slow zone was needed while marshals repaired the barriers. Laurens Vanthoor made a pit stop when the slow zone was in effect, and the time saved earned the No. 6 Penske Porsche the race lead over Hirakawa's No. 8 Toyota.

Mancinelli's No. 27 Heart of Racing Aston Martin was being lapped by the No. 51 LMH Ferrari when he lost control on a wet patch. He collided at high speed with the inside tyre wall backwards at Indianapolis corner, and his car landed upside down after going airborne. Mancinelli was unhurt, but safety cars were dispatched for the third time to recover the vehicle and repair the barrier. Some cars suffered issues during the third safety car period. Nico Müller ran wide and crashed the No. 93 Peugeot into the tyre barrier at the Indianapolis turn, while Dixon's No. 3 Cadillac stopped with an oil leak caused by a punctured oil tank on the Mulsanne Straight but was able to return to the garage on electric power, where the car was retired, extending the safety car period while it was tended to. When racing resumed, it became a four-car duel between Ferrari, Porsche, Toyota and Cadillac for the overall lead. The LMP2 category remained competitive, with the No. 34 Inter Europol, No. 10 Vector, and No. 28 IDEC cars competing for the class lead, while LMGT3 became a two-car battle between the No. 91 Manthey EMA Porsche and No. 31 WRT BMW.

=== Afternoon to finish ===
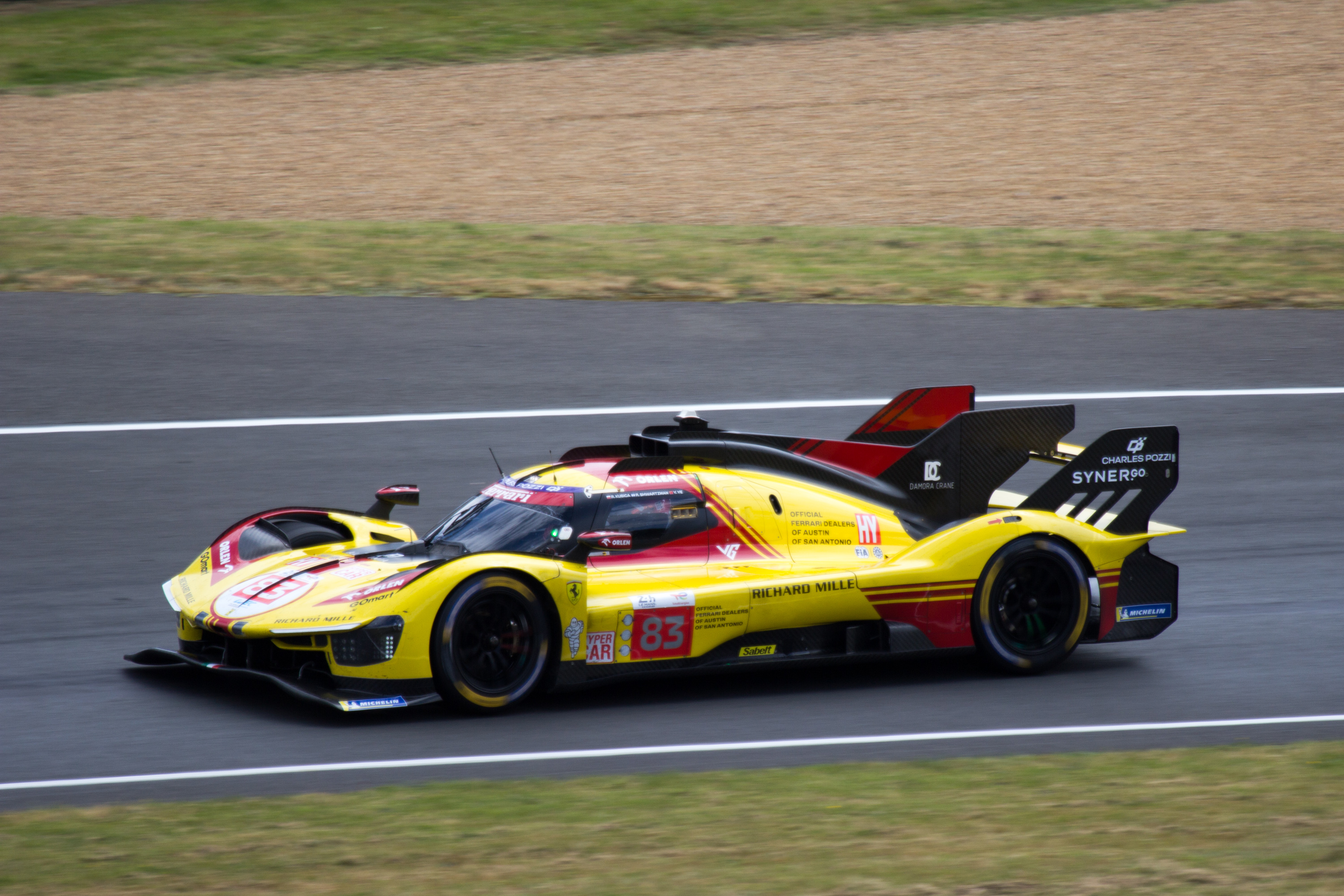
AF Corse's No. 83 Ferrari was forced to retire from the battle for the win because of a motor–generator unit fault.

Shwartzman brought the No. 83 Ferrari into the pit lane and moved it into the garage with smoke coming from the brakes due to a motor–generator unit malfunction on the front axle in the 21st hour, forcing the car to retire. Rain returned to the track before the end of the following hour, and teams switched back to wet-weather tyres. Jarvis's No. 22 United entry took the lead in the LMP2 category during the pit stop cycle. Hartley's No. 8 Toyota lost time in pit lane due to a defective wheel gun that was unable to install the front-right tyre. Nielsen's No. 50 Ferrari was investigated for a probable unsafe release into the path of the No. 37 Cool LMP2 car but was not penalised. Soon after, Pier Guidi's No. 51 Ferrari collided with Hartley's No. 8 Toyota the right-hand Mulsanne circuit, as Pier Guidi attempted to overtake Hartley on the inside for second. The accident sent Hartley spinning to the inside of the turn, and the No. 8 Toyota dropped to sixth place after losing about 35 seconds on that lap and five on the following lap as he generated heat in his tyres.

López's No. 7 Toyota gained on Pier Guidi's No. 51 Ferrari and attempted to pass the Ferrari for second place at the Dunlop Chicane, but the two cars collided. He then slipstreamed by Pier Guidi on the Mulsanne Straight and took second into the first chicane. The right-hand side door on the No. 50 Ferrari struggled to stay shut, and Nielsen attempted to close it harder but was unsuccessful. The race director and black-and-white warning flags directed Nielsen to make a pit stop to repair the broken door, promoting López's No. 7 Toyota to the race lead and dropping Nielsen to fifth. The No. 51 Ferrari received a five-second time penalty to be served at its next pit stop after being determined to have caused the accident with the No. 8 Toyota. Nielsen's No. 50 Ferrari was out of the typical pit stop sequence compared to the rest of the Hypercar field, allowing him to reclaim the overall lead once the other cars made pit stops. Toyota kept López in the No. 7 vehicle rather than replacing him with Kobayashi due to his experience with the car's performance in the rain.

Nielsen employed a strategy that saw him conserve fuel and battery usage while under pressure from López's No. 7 Toyota, despite López's need to change the Toyota's power cycle after exiting the pit lane. He crossed the finish line first, securing victory for the No. 50 Ferrari team after 311 laps. It was Fuoco's, Molina's and Nielsen's first overall Le Mans win, Ferrari's 11th and its second in succession. They finished 14.2 seconds ahead of the second-placed No. 7 Toyota, which suffered three slow punctures and a turbocharger boost fault caused by a sensor issue. The No. 51 Ferrari completed the overall podium in third. The No. 22 United Autosports entry earned its first LMP2 win since 2020 and second in the category, 18.651 seconds ahead of Inter Europol's No. 34 entry and 33 seconds ahead of the third-placed No. 28 IDEC team. The No. 183 AF Corse squad won the LMP2 Pro-Am category by two laps over the No. 14 AO by TF team, despite finishing fourth overall in class due to a lack of pace in wet conditions. Porsche won the first LMGT3 race at Le Mans, its first category win since 2022, with the No. 91 Manthey EMA car finishing one lap ahead of the No. 31 WRT BMW. A record number of cars, nine, finished on the lead lap.

== Post-race ==
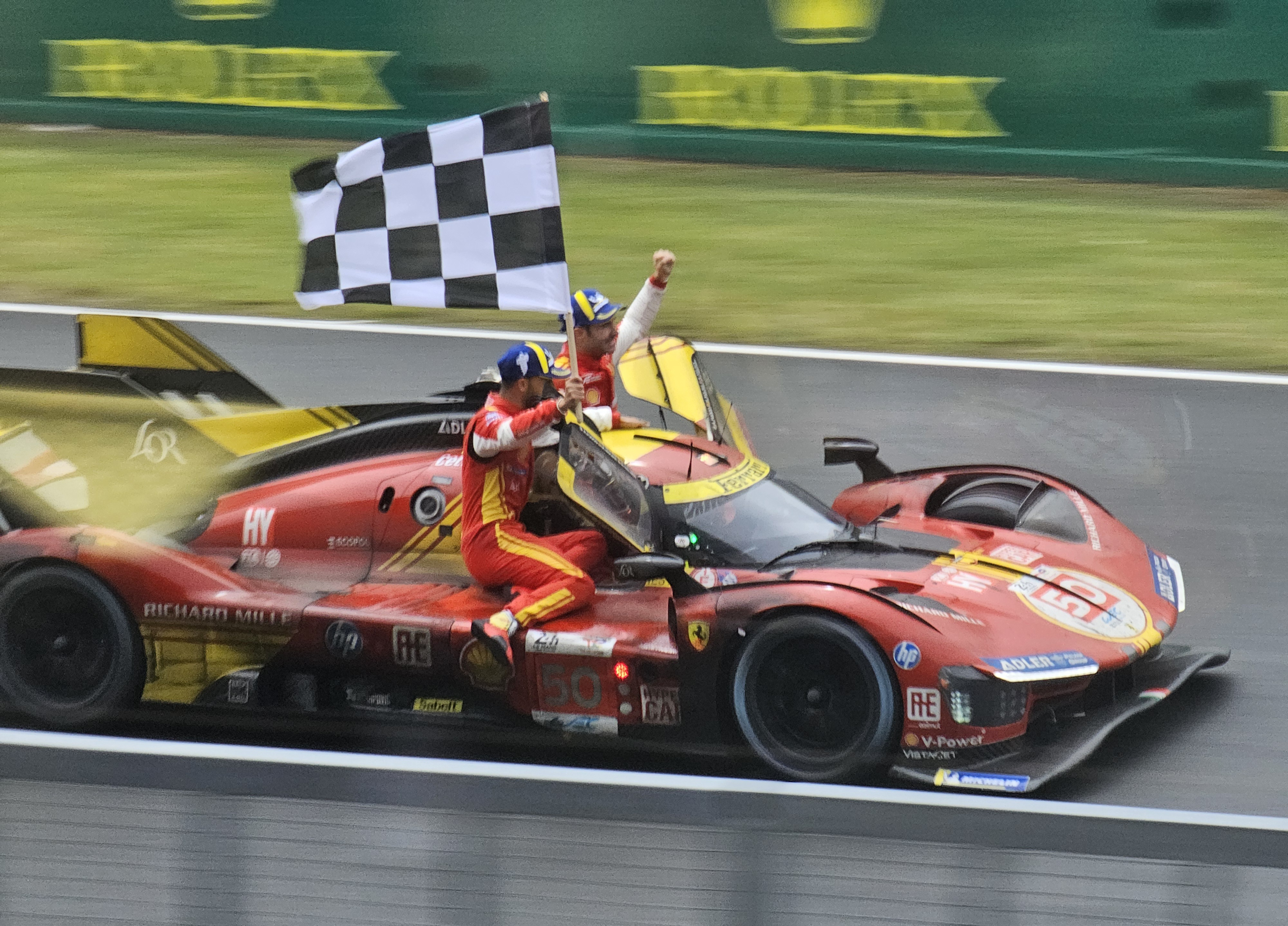
The No. 50 Ferrari 499P being driven towards the pit lane exit after winning the race.

The top three teams from each of the four classes appeared on the podium to collect their awards and had individual press conferences. Nielsen said that "It was one of the toughest races I've ever done" because of the changeable conditions and the door issue. Fuoco added his team were prepared and said "It is still not easy to understand what we have managed to achieve." Molina praised the last switch to wet-weather tyres and was proud of his team, "We've been looking for this result for so long, and we are really proud. Today was our day, actually! We experienced some tense moments, but we could go through them. And at the end, the result was here." De Vries said he felt "bittersweet" about coming second because of the No. 7 Toyota team's technical troubles, "We could have maybe had a closer shot. But at the end of the day, that's part of racing." López argued that Toyota had the pace to win and described the event as "the hardest one I have ever experienced." Calado confessed Ferrari underperformed in the wet compared to the dry, adding that strategy errors put his team "on the back foot through the race."

Siegel compared his failure to qualify for the Indianapolis 500 to winning the LMP2 class at Le Mans, "Pretty cool to have had the opportunity to compete in the two biggest races in the world in the same year and for the first time for both of them. Two pretty polar opposite results, so it has definitely been interesting, but extremely grateful to have won here." Jarvis described the race as the most difficult of his career due to the changing track conditions, saying there were times when he was unsure if he would win or crash. Lietz commented on his fifth Le Mans GT class victory, "To be honest, always when you were there, you were like, 'This is really, really nice.' You know all these people. And it's the one place you want to come back every year." His co-driver Yasser Shahin remarked "We're pleased Le Mans chose us this year" and Schuring added "Winning Le Mans is a dream; anyone would sign up for that."

WRT team principal Vincent Vosse and Dries Vanthoor argued the 30-second stop-and-go penalty issued on Kubica for his seventh-hour collision with Vanthoor was too lenient; Vosse added he would have lobbied for a three or five-minute time penalty, putting the No. 83 Ferrari one lap behind. Vanthoor stated on a podcast that he believed Kubica purposely caused the accident based on his post-accident behaviour. He received hate messages on social media accusing him of failing to comply with blue flags when the quicker Kubica was behind him, but said he had ample time inside two sectors to let Kubica pass. Kubica denied causing the accident on purpose, saying attempting to hit another car at high speed would have jeopardised his chances of winning. He said of the blue flags that "there are drivers in slower cars who want to prove themselves at all costs. I don't know why" after highlighting the difference in blue flag rules in different series.

Ferrari global head of endurance Antonello Coletta believed the win came after learning from an error it made at the 6 Hours of Imola when it lost a certain win by keeping their cars on track with dry tyres despite being fastest overall. According to Porsche LMDh factory director Urs Kuratle, the German marque lacked top speed compared to their rivals and made strategy errors with regards what tyres to use in the changing conditions. Hartley stated the No. 8 Toyota's late-race spin eliminated him and his co-drivers from contention for the win in the final hours. Christensen believed Ferrari and Toyota went faster during race week to beat Porsche, while the marque's motorsport boss Thomas Laudenbach said that the pace was substantially different from that observed during practice, "If other competitors didn't want to show everything in the practice that's of no meaning to me."

Estre, Lotterer and Vanthoor remained atop the Hypercar Drivers' Championship with 99 points, while race winners Fuoco, Molina and Nielsen move from fifth to second, nine points behind. Lietz, Shahin and Schuring moved into joint first in the Endurance Trophy for LMGT3 Drivers, tied with Bachler, Sturm and Malykhin on points. Porsche maintained its lead in the Hypercar World Endurance Championship, but Ferrari reduced the gap to nine points. Hertz Team Jota increased their lead in the World Cup for Hypercar Teams to 50 points over Proton Competition and Manthey EMA became the joint leaders of the Endurance Trophy for LMGT3 Teams with Manthey PureRxcing with four races remaining in the season.

== Official results ==
The minimum number of laps for classification (70 per cent of the overall race winner's distance) was 217 laps. Class winners are denoted in bold and ‡. (Note: The race classification remained provisional until July 2024 following the completion of an Automobile Club de l'Ouest and Fédération Internationale de l'Automobile (FIA) investigation into the compliance of components that were impounded from seven cars by both bodies during post-race scrutineering. All of the impounded components were found to comply with their technical regulations.)

Final race classification
Pos	Class	No.	Team	Drivers	Chassis	Tyre	Laps	Time/Reason
Pos	Class	No.	Team	Drivers	Engine	Tyre	Laps	Time/Reason
1	**Hypercar**	**50**	**(Italy) Ferrari AF Corse**	**(Italy) Antonio Fuoco (Spain) Miguel Molina (Denmark) Nicklas Nielsen**	**Ferrari 499P**	M	**311**	**24:01:55.856‡**
1	**Hypercar**	**50**	**(Italy) Ferrari AF Corse**	**(Italy) Antonio Fuoco (Spain) Miguel Molina (Denmark) Nicklas Nielsen**	**Ferrari F163 3.0 L Turbo V6**	M	**311**	**24:01:55.856‡**
2	Hypercar	7	(Japan) Toyota Gazoo Racing	(Japan) Kamui Kobayashi (Argentina) José María López (Netherlands) Nyck de Vries	Toyota GR010 Hybrid	M	311	+14.221
2	Hypercar	7	(Japan) Toyota Gazoo Racing	(Japan) Kamui Kobayashi (Argentina) José María López (Netherlands) Nyck de Vries	Toyota H8909 3.5 L Turbo V6	M	311	+14.221
3	Hypercar	51	(Italy) Ferrari AF Corse	(United Kingdom) James Calado (Italy) Antonio Giovinazzi (Italy) Alessandro Pier Guidi	Ferrari 499P	M	311	+36.730
3	Hypercar	51	(Italy) Ferrari AF Corse	(United Kingdom) James Calado (Italy) Antonio Giovinazzi (Italy) Alessandro Pier Guidi	Ferrari F163 3.0 L Turbo V6	M	311	+36.730
4	Hypercar	6	(Germany) Porsche Penske Motorsport	(France) Kévin Estre (Germany) André Lotterer (Belgium) Laurens Vanthoor	Porsche 963	M	311	+37.897
4	Hypercar	6	(Germany) Porsche Penske Motorsport	(France) Kévin Estre (Germany) André Lotterer (Belgium) Laurens Vanthoor	Porsche 9RD 4.6 L Turbo V8	M	311	+37.897
5	Hypercar	8	(Japan) Toyota Gazoo Racing	(Switzerland) Sébastien Buemi (New Zealand) Brendon Hartley (Japan) Ryō Hirakawa	Toyota GR010 Hybrid	M	311	+1:02.824
5	Hypercar	8	(Japan) Toyota Gazoo Racing	(Switzerland) Sébastien Buemi (New Zealand) Brendon Hartley (Japan) Ryō Hirakawa	Toyota H8909 3.5 L Turbo V6	M	311	+1:02.824
6	Hypercar	5	(Germany) Porsche Penske Motorsport	(Australia) Matt Campbell (Denmark) Michael Christensen (France) Frédéric Makowiecki	Porsche 963	M	311	+1:45.654
6	Hypercar	5	(Germany) Porsche Penske Motorsport	(Australia) Matt Campbell (Denmark) Michael Christensen (France) Frédéric Makowiecki	Porsche 9RD 4.6 L Turbo V8	M	311	+1:45.654
7	Hypercar	2	(United States) Cadillac Racing	(New Zealand) Earl Bamber (United Kingdom) Alex Lynn (Spain) Álex Palou	Cadillac V-Series.R	M	311	+2:34.468
7	Hypercar	2	(United States) Cadillac Racing	(New Zealand) Earl Bamber (United Kingdom) Alex Lynn (Spain) Álex Palou	Cadillac LMC55R 5.5 L V8	M	311	+2:34.468
8	Hypercar	12	(United Kingdom) Hertz Team Jota	(United Kingdom) Callum Ilott (France) Norman Nato (United Kingdom) Will Stevens	Porsche 963	M	311	+3:02.691
8	Hypercar	12	(United Kingdom) Hertz Team Jota	(United Kingdom) Callum Ilott (France) Norman Nato (United Kingdom) Will Stevens	Porsche 9RD 4.6 L Turbo V8	M	311	+3:02.691
9	Hypercar	38	(United Kingdom) Hertz Team Jota	(United Kingdom) Jenson Button (United Kingdom) Phil Hanson (Denmark) Oliver Rasmussen	Porsche 963	M	311	+3:36.756
9	Hypercar	38	(United Kingdom) Hertz Team Jota	(United Kingdom) Jenson Button (United Kingdom) Phil Hanson (Denmark) Oliver Rasmussen	Porsche 9RD 4.6 L Turbo V8	M	311	+3:36.756
10	Hypercar	63	(Italy) Lamborghini Iron Lynx	(Italy) Mirko Bortolotti; Daniil Kvyat (Note: Kvyat and Boguslavskiy are Russian, but they compete as neutral competitors as Russian national emblems were banned by the FIA following the Russian invasion of Ukraine. Lomko, also a Russian, competes under a Grenadian licence for the same reason.) (Italy) Edoardo Mortara	Lamborghini SC63	M	309	+2 laps
10	Hypercar	63	(Italy) Lamborghini Iron Lynx	(Italy) Mirko Bortolotti; Daniil Kvyat (Italy) Edoardo Mortara	Lamborghini 3.8 L Turbo V8	M	309	+2 laps
11	Hypercar	94	(France) Peugeot TotalEnergies	(United Kingdom) Paul di Resta (France) Loïc Duval (Belgium) Stoffel Vandoorne	Peugeot 9X8	M	309	+2 laps
11	Hypercar	94	(France) Peugeot TotalEnergies	(United Kingdom) Paul di Resta (France) Loïc Duval (Belgium) Stoffel Vandoorne	Peugeot X6H 2.6 L Turbo V6	M	309	+2 laps
12	Hypercar	93	(France) Peugeot TotalEnergies	(Denmark) Mikkel Jensen (Switzerland) Nico Müller (France) Jean-Éric Vergne	Peugeot 9X8	M	309	+2 laps
12	Hypercar	93	(France) Peugeot TotalEnergies	(Denmark) Mikkel Jensen (Switzerland) Nico Müller (France) Jean-Éric Vergne	Peugeot X6H 2.6 L Turbo V6	M	309	+2 laps
13	Hypercar	19	(Italy) Lamborghini Iron Lynx	(Italy) Matteo Cairoli (Italy) Andrea Caldarelli (France) Romain Grosjean	Lamborghini SC63	M	309	+2 laps
13	Hypercar	19	(Italy) Lamborghini Iron Lynx	(Italy) Matteo Cairoli (Italy) Andrea Caldarelli (France) Romain Grosjean	Lamborghini 3.8 L Turbo V8	M	309	+2 laps
14	Hypercar	11	(Italy) Isotta Fraschini	(Thailand) Carl Bennett (Canada) Antonio Serravalle (France) Jean-Karl Vernay	Isotta Fraschini Tipo 6-C	M	302	+9 laps
14	Hypercar	11	(Italy) Isotta Fraschini	(Thailand) Carl Bennett (Canada) Antonio Serravalle (France) Jean-Karl Vernay	Isotta Fraschini 3.0 L Turbo V6	M	302	+9 laps
15	**LMP2**	**22**	**(United Kingdom) United Autosports**	**(United States) Bijoy Garg (United Kingdom) Oliver Jarvis (United States) Nolan Siegel**	**Oreca 07**	G	**297**	**+14 laps‡**
15	**LMP2**	**22**	**(United Kingdom) United Autosports**	**(United States) Bijoy Garg (United Kingdom) Oliver Jarvis (United States) Nolan Siegel**	**Gibson GK428 4.2 L V8**	G	**297**	**+14 laps‡**
16	LMP2	34	(Poland) Inter Europol Competition	(Grenada) Vladislav Lomko (France) Clément Novalak (Poland) Jakub Śmiechowski	Oreca 07	G	297	+14 laps
16	LMP2	34	(Poland) Inter Europol Competition	(Grenada) Vladislav Lomko (France) Clément Novalak (Poland) Jakub Śmiechowski	Gibson GK428 4.2 L V8	G	297	+14 laps
17	LMP2	28	(France) IDEC Sport	(France) Reshad de Gerus (France) Paul Lafargue (Netherlands) Job van Uitert	Oreca 07	G	297	+14 laps
17	LMP2	28	(France) IDEC Sport	(France) Reshad de Gerus (France) Paul Lafargue (Netherlands) Job van Uitert	Gibson GK428 4.2 L V8	G	297	+14 laps
18	**LMP2 (Pro-Am)**	**183**	**(Italy) AF Corse**	**(United Kingdom) Ben Barnicoat (France) François Perrodo (Argentina) Nicolás Varrone**	**Oreca 07**	G	**297**	**+14 laps‡**
18	**LMP2 (Pro-Am)**	**183**	**(Italy) AF Corse**	**(United Kingdom) Ben Barnicoat (France) François Perrodo (Argentina) Nicolás Varrone**	**Gibson GK428 4.2 L V8**	G	**297**	**+14 laps‡**
19	LMP2	10	(United Kingdom) Vector Sport	(Republic of Ireland) Ryan Cullen (France) Patrick Pilet (Monaco) Stéphane Richelmi	Oreca 07	G	297	+14 laps
19	LMP2	10	(United Kingdom) Vector Sport	(Republic of Ireland) Ryan Cullen (France) Patrick Pilet (Monaco) Stéphane Richelmi	Gibson GK428 4.2 L V8	G	297	+14 laps
20	LMP2 (Pro-Am)	14	(United States) AO by TF	(Switzerland) Louis Delétraz (United States) P. J. Hyett (United Kingdom) Alex Quinn	Oreca 07	G	295	+16 laps
20	LMP2 (Pro-Am)	14	(United States) AO by TF	(Switzerland) Louis Delétraz (United States) P. J. Hyett (United Kingdom) Alex Quinn	Gibson GK428 4.2 L V8	G	295	+16 laps
21	LMP2 (Pro-Am)	33	(Luxembourg) DKR Engineering	(Austria) René Binder (Germany) Laurents Hörr (Germany) Alexander Mattschull	Oreca 07	G	295	+16 laps
21	LMP2 (Pro-Am)	33	(Luxembourg) DKR Engineering	(Austria) René Binder (Germany) Laurents Hörr (Germany) Alexander Mattschull	Gibson GK428 4.2 L V8	G	295	+16 laps
22	LMP2	25	(Portugal) Algarve Pro Racing	(United Kingdom) Olli Caldwell (Canada) Roman De Angelis (Liechtenstein) Matthias Kaiser	Oreca 07	G	294	+17 laps
22	LMP2	25	(Portugal) Algarve Pro Racing	(United Kingdom) Olli Caldwell (Canada) Roman De Angelis (Liechtenstein) Matthias Kaiser	Gibson GK428 4.2 L V8	G	294	+17 laps
23	LMP2 (Pro-Am)	65	(France) Panis Racing	(Switzerland) Mathias Beche (United States) Scott Huffaker (United States) Rodrigo Sales	Oreca 07	G	293	+18 laps
23	LMP2 (Pro-Am)	65	(France) Panis Racing	(Switzerland) Mathias Beche (United States) Scott Huffaker (United States) Rodrigo Sales	Gibson GK428 4.2 L V8	G	293	+18 laps
24	LMP2 (Pro-Am)	47	(Switzerland) Cool Racing	(United Kingdom) Matt Bell (United States) Naveen Rao (Denmark) Frederik Vesti	Oreca 07	G	291	+20 laps
24	LMP2 (Pro-Am)	47	(Switzerland) Cool Racing	(United Kingdom) Matt Bell (United States) Naveen Rao (Denmark) Frederik Vesti	Gibson GK428 4.2 L V8	G	291	+20 laps
25	LMP2	24	(United Kingdom) Nielsen Racing	(Denmark) David Heinemeier Hansson (Switzerland) Fabio Scherer (Cayman Islands) Kyffin Simpson	Oreca 07	G	291	+20 laps
25	LMP2	24	(United Kingdom) Nielsen Racing	(Denmark) David Heinemeier Hansson (Switzerland) Fabio Scherer (Cayman Islands) Kyffin Simpson	Gibson GK428 4.2 L V8	G	291	+20 laps
26	LMP2	37	(Switzerland) Cool Racing	(Spain) Lorenzo Fluxá (Denmark) Malthe Jakobsen (Japan) Ritomo Miyata	Oreca 07	G	289	+22 laps
26	LMP2	37	(Switzerland) Cool Racing	(Spain) Lorenzo Fluxá (Denmark) Malthe Jakobsen (Japan) Ritomo Miyata	Gibson GK428 4.2 L V8	G	289	+22 laps
27	**LMGT3**	**91**	**(Germany) Manthey EMA**	**(Austria) Richard Lietz (Netherlands) Morris Schuring (Australia) Yasser Shahin**	**Porsche 911 GT3 R (992)**	G	**281**	**+30 laps‡**
27	**LMGT3**	**91**	**(Germany) Manthey EMA**	**(Austria) Richard Lietz (Netherlands) Morris Schuring (Australia) Yasser Shahin**	**Porsche M97/80 4.2 L Flat-6**	G	**281**	**+30 laps‡**
28	LMGT3	31	(Belgium) Team WRT	(Brazil) Augusto Farfus (Indonesia) Sean Gelael (United Kingdom) Darren Leung	BMW M4 GT3	G	280	+31 laps
28	LMGT3	31	(Belgium) Team WRT	(Brazil) Augusto Farfus (Indonesia) Sean Gelael (United Kingdom) Darren Leung	BMW P58 3.0 L Turbo I6	G	280	+31 laps
29	Hypercar	311	(United States) Whelen Cadillac Racing	(United Kingdom) Jack Aitken (Brazil) Pipo Derani (Brazil) Felipe Drugovich	Cadillac V-Series.R	M	280	+31 laps
29	Hypercar	311	(United States) Whelen Cadillac Racing	(United Kingdom) Jack Aitken (Brazil) Pipo Derani (Brazil) Felipe Drugovich	Cadillac LMC55R 5.5 L V8	M	280	+31 laps
30	LMGT3	88	(Germany) Proton Competition	(Norway) Dennis Olsen (Denmark) Mikkel O. Pedersen (Italy) Giorgio Roda	Ford Mustang GT3	G	280	+31 laps
30	LMGT3	88	(Germany) Proton Competition	(Norway) Dennis Olsen (Denmark) Mikkel O. Pedersen (Italy) Giorgio Roda	Ford Coyote 5.4 L V8	G	280	+31 laps
31	LMGT3	44	(Germany) Proton Competition	(United Kingdom) John Hartshorne (Germany) Christopher Mies (United Kingdom) Ben Tuck	Ford Mustang GT3	G	280	+31 laps
31	LMGT3	44	(Germany) Proton Competition	(United Kingdom) John Hartshorne (Germany) Christopher Mies (United Kingdom) Ben Tuck	Ford Coyote 5.4 L V8	G	280	+31 laps
32	LMGT3	85	(Italy) Iron Dames	(Belgium) Sarah Bovy (Switzerland) Rahel Frey (Denmark) Michelle Gatting	Lamborghini Huracán GT3 Evo 2	G	279	+32 laps
32	LMGT3	85	(Italy) Iron Dames	(Belgium) Sarah Bovy (Switzerland) Rahel Frey (Denmark) Michelle Gatting	Lamborghini DGF 5.2 L V10	G	279	+32 laps
33	LMGT3	55	(Italy) Vista AF Corse	(France) François Hériau (United States) Simon Mann (Italy) Alessio Rovera	Ferrari 296 GT3	G	279	+32 laps
33	LMGT3	55	(Italy) Vista AF Corse	(France) François Hériau (United States) Simon Mann (Italy) Alessio Rovera	Ferrari F163CE 3.0 L Turbo V6	G	279	+32 laps
34	LMGT3	78	(France) Akkodis ASP Team	Timur Boguslavskiy (France) Arnold Robin (South Africa) Kelvin van der Linde	Lexus RC F GT3	G	279	+32 laps
34	LMGT3	78	(France) Akkodis ASP Team	Timur Boguslavskiy (France) Arnold Robin (South Africa) Kelvin van der Linde	Lexus 2UR-GSE 5.4 L V8	G	279	+32 laps
35	LMGT3	155	(Italy) Spirit of Race	(Denmark) Conrad Laursen (Denmark) Johnny Laursen (United States) Jordan Taylor	Ferrari 296 GT3	G	279	+32 laps
35	LMGT3	155	(Italy) Spirit of Race	(Denmark) Conrad Laursen (Denmark) Johnny Laursen (United States) Jordan Taylor	Ferrari F163CE 3.0 L Turbo V6	G	279	+32 laps
36	LMGT3	777	(Japan) D'station Racing	(France) Erwan Bastard (Japan) Satoshi Hoshino (Denmark) Marco Sørensen	Aston Martin Vantage AMR GT3 Evo	G	279	+32 laps
36	LMGT3	777	(Japan) D'station Racing	(France) Erwan Bastard (Japan) Satoshi Hoshino (Denmark) Marco Sørensen	Aston Martin M177 4.0 L Turbo V8	G	279	+32 laps
37	LMGT3	87	(France) Akkodis ASP Team	(United Kingdom) Jack Hawksworth (Japan) Takeshi Kimura (France) Esteban Masson	Lexus RC F GT3	G	279	+32 laps
37	LMGT3	87	(France) Akkodis ASP Team	(United Kingdom) Jack Hawksworth (Japan) Takeshi Kimura (France) Esteban Masson	Lexus 2UR-GSE 5.4 L V8	G	279	+32 laps
38	LMGT3	82	(United Kingdom) TF Sport	(France) Sébastien Baud (Spain) Daniel Juncadella (Japan) Hiroshi Koizumi	Chevrolet Corvette Z06 GT3.R	G	278	+33 laps
38	LMGT3	82	(United Kingdom) TF Sport	(France) Sébastien Baud (Spain) Daniel Juncadella (Japan) Hiroshi Koizumi	Chevrolet LT6.R 5.5 L V8	G	278	+33 laps
39	LMGT3	86	(United Kingdom) GR Racing	(Italy) Riccardo Pera (Brazil) Daniel Serra (United Kingdom) Michael Wainwright	Ferrari 296 GT3	G	278	+33 laps
39	LMGT3	86	(United Kingdom) GR Racing	(Italy) Riccardo Pera (Brazil) Daniel Serra (United Kingdom) Michael Wainwright	Ferrari F163CE 3.0 L Turbo V6	G	278	+33 laps
40	LMGT3	70	(United Kingdom) Inception Racing	(United States) Brendan Iribe (United Kingdom) Ollie Millroy (Denmark) Frederik Schandorff	McLaren 720S GT3 Evo	G	275	+36 laps
40	LMGT3	70	(United Kingdom) Inception Racing	(United States) Brendan Iribe (United Kingdom) Ollie Millroy (Denmark) Frederik Schandorff	McLaren M840T 4.0 L Turbo V8	G	275	+36 laps
41	LMGT3	92	(Lithuania) Manthey PureRxcing	(Austria) Klaus Bachler (Saint Kitts and Nevis) Alex Malykhin (Note: Malykhin is Belarusian, but he competes under a Kittitian licence as Belarusian national emblems were banned by the FIA following the Russian invasion of Ukraine.) (Germany) Joel Sturm	Porsche 911 GT3 R (992)	G	273	+38 laps
41	LMGT3	92	(Lithuania) Manthey PureRxcing	(Austria) Klaus Bachler (Saint Kitts and Nevis) Alex Malykhin (Germany) Joel Sturm	Porsche M97/80 4.2 L Flat-6	G	273	+38 laps
42	LMP2 (Pro-Am)	23	(United States) United Autosports USA	(Portugal) Filipe Albuquerque (United Kingdom) Ben Hanley (United States) Ben Keating	Oreca 07	G	272	+39 laps
42	LMP2 (Pro-Am)	23	(United States) United Autosports USA	(Portugal) Filipe Albuquerque (United Kingdom) Ben Hanley (United States) Ben Keating	Gibson GK428 4.2 L V8	G	272	+39 laps
43	LMGT3	81	(United Kingdom) TF Sport	(Angola) Rui Andrade (Republic of Ireland) Charlie Eastwood (Belgium) Tom Van Rompuy	Chevrolet Corvette Z06 GT3.R	G	267	+44 laps
43	LMGT3	81	(United Kingdom) TF Sport	(Angola) Rui Andrade (Republic of Ireland) Charlie Eastwood (Belgium) Tom Van Rompuy	Chevrolet LT6.R 5.5 L V8	G	267	+44 laps
44	LMGT3	60	(Italy) Iron Lynx	(Italy) Matteo Cressoni (France) Franck Perera (Italy) Claudio Schiavoni	Lamborghini Huracán GT3 Evo 2	G	258	+53 laps
44	LMGT3	60	(Italy) Iron Lynx	(Italy) Matteo Cressoni (France) Franck Perera (Italy) Claudio Schiavoni	Lamborghini DGF 5.2 L V10	G	258	+53 laps
45	Hypercar	99	(Germany) Proton Competition	(France) Julien Andlauer (Switzerland) Neel Jani (United Kingdom) Harry Tincknell	Porsche 963	M	251	+60 laps
45	Hypercar	99	(Germany) Proton Competition	(France) Julien Andlauer (Switzerland) Neel Jani (United Kingdom) Harry Tincknell	Porsche 9RD 4.6 L Turbo V8	M	251	+60 laps
46	LMGT3	77	(Germany) Proton Competition	(United Kingdom) Ben Barker (United States) Ryan Hardwick (Canada) Zacharie Robichon	Ford Mustang GT3	G	227	+84 laps
46	LMGT3	77	(Germany) Proton Competition	(United Kingdom) Ben Barker (United States) Ryan Hardwick (Canada) Zacharie Robichon	Ford Coyote 5.4 L V8	G	227	+84 laps
NC	Hypercar	20	(Belgium) BMW M Team WRT	(Netherlands) Robin Frijns (Germany) René Rast (South Africa) Sheldon van der Linde	BMW M Hybrid V8	M	96	Insufficient distance
NC	Hypercar	20	(Belgium) BMW M Team WRT	(Netherlands) Robin Frijns (Germany) René Rast (South Africa) Sheldon van der Linde	BMW P66/3 4.0 L Turbo V8	M	96	Insufficient distance
DNF	Hypercar	83	(Italy) AF Corse	(Poland) Robert Kubica (Israel) Robert Shwartzman (China) Yifei Ye	Ferrari 499P	M	248	Electronics
DNF	Hypercar	83	(Italy) AF Corse	(Poland) Robert Kubica (Israel) Robert Shwartzman (China) Yifei Ye	Ferrari F163 3.0 L Turbo V6	M	248	Electronics
DNF	Hypercar	3	(United States) Cadillac Racing	(France) Sébastien Bourdais (New Zealand) Scott Dixon (Netherlands) Renger van der Zande	Cadillac V-Series.R	M	223	Mechanical
DNF	Hypercar	3	(United States) Cadillac Racing	(France) Sébastien Bourdais (New Zealand) Scott Dixon (Netherlands) Renger van der Zande	Cadillac LMC55R 5.5 L V8	M	223	Mechanical
DNF	LMGT3	59	(United Kingdom) United Autosports	(Brazil) Nicolas Costa (United Kingdom) James Cottingham (Switzerland) Grégoire Saucy	McLaren 720S GT3 Evo	G	220	Retired
DNF	LMGT3	59	(United Kingdom) United Autosports	(Brazil) Nicolas Costa (United Kingdom) James Cottingham (Switzerland) Grégoire Saucy	McLaren M840T 4.0 L Turbo V8	G	220	Retired
DNF	LMGT3	95	(United Kingdom) United Autosports	(Japan) Hiroshi Hamaguchi (Chile) Nico Pino (Japan) Marino Sato	McLaren 720S GT3 Evo	G	212	Retired
DNF	LMGT3	95	(United Kingdom) United Autosports	(Japan) Hiroshi Hamaguchi (Chile) Nico Pino (Japan) Marino Sato	McLaren M840T 4.0 L Turbo V8	G	212	Retired
DNF	Hypercar	4	(Germany) Porsche Penske Motorsport	(France) Mathieu Jaminet (Brazil) Felipe Nasr (United Kingdom) Nick Tandy	Porsche 963	M	211	Crash
DNF	Hypercar	4	(Germany) Porsche Penske Motorsport	(France) Mathieu Jaminet (Brazil) Felipe Nasr (United Kingdom) Nick Tandy	Porsche 9RD 4.6 L Turbo V8	M	211	Crash
DNF	LMGT3	27	(United States) Heart of Racing Team	(United Kingdom) Ian James (Italy) Daniel Mancinelli (Spain) Alex Riberas	Aston Martin Vantage AMR GT3 Evo	G	196	Crash
DNF	LMGT3	27	(United States) Heart of Racing Team	(United Kingdom) Ian James (Italy) Daniel Mancinelli (Spain) Alex Riberas	Aston Martin M177 4.0 L Turbo V8	G	196	Crash
DNF	LMP2 (Pro-Am)	45	(Portugal) CrowdStrike Racing by APR	(United States) Colin Braun (Netherlands) Nicky Catsburg (United States) George Kurtz	Oreca 07	G	149	Loose wheel
DNF	LMP2 (Pro-Am)	45	(Portugal) CrowdStrike Racing by APR	(United States) Colin Braun (Netherlands) Nicky Catsburg (United States) George Kurtz	Gibson GK428 4.2 L V8	G	149	Loose wheel
DNF	LMP2 (Pro-Am)	30	(France) Duqueine Team	(Australia) James Allen (United States) John Falb (France) Jean-Baptiste Simmenauer	Oreca 07	G	112	Engine
DNF	LMP2 (Pro-Am)	30	(France) Duqueine Team	(Australia) James Allen (United States) John Falb (France) Jean-Baptiste Simmenauer	Gibson GK428 4.2 L V8	G	112	Engine
DNF	LMGT3	66	(United Kingdom) JMW Motorsport	(Italy) Giacomo Petrobelli (Netherlands) Larry ten Voorde (Turkey) Salih Yoluç	Ferrari 296 GT3	G	112	Fuel pump
DNF	LMGT3	66	(United Kingdom) JMW Motorsport	(Italy) Giacomo Petrobelli (Netherlands) Larry ten Voorde (Turkey) Salih Yoluç	Ferrari F163CE 3.0 L Turbo V6	G	112	Fuel pump
DNF	LMGT3	46	(Belgium) Team WRT	(Oman) Ahmad Al Harthy (Belgium) Maxime Martin (Italy) Valentino Rossi	BMW M4 GT3	G	109	Accident
DNF	LMGT3	46	(Belgium) Team WRT	(Oman) Ahmad Al Harthy (Belgium) Maxime Martin (Italy) Valentino Rossi	BMW P58 3.0 L Turbo I6	G	109	Accident
DNF	Hypercar	15	(Belgium) BMW M Team WRT	(Switzerland) Raffaele Marciello (Belgium) Dries Vanthoor (Germany) Marco Wittmann	BMW M Hybrid V8	M	102	Accident
DNF	Hypercar	15	(Belgium) BMW M Team WRT	(Switzerland) Raffaele Marciello (Belgium) Dries Vanthoor (Germany) Marco Wittmann	BMW P66/3 4.0 L Turbo V8	M	102	Accident
DNF	Hypercar	36	(France) Alpine Endurance Team	(France) Nicolas Lapierre (Germany) Mick Schumacher (France) Matthieu Vaxivière	Alpine A424	M	88	Engine
DNF	Hypercar	36	(France) Alpine Endurance Team	(France) Nicolas Lapierre (Germany) Mick Schumacher (France) Matthieu Vaxivière	Alpine V634 3.4 L Turbo V6	M	88	Engine
DNF	LMP2	9	(Germany) Proton Competition	(France) Macéo Capietto (Germany) Jonas Ried (Netherlands) Bent Viscaal	Oreca 07	G	86	Battery
DNF	LMP2	9	(Germany) Proton Competition	(France) Macéo Capietto (Germany) Jonas Ried (Netherlands) Bent Viscaal	Gibson GK428 4.2 L V8	G	86	Battery
DNF	Hypercar	35	(France) Alpine Endurance Team	(France) Paul-Loup Chatin (Austria) Ferdinand Habsburg (France) Charles Milesi	Alpine A424	M	75	Engine
DNF	Hypercar	35	(France) Alpine Endurance Team	(France) Paul-Loup Chatin (Austria) Ferdinand Habsburg (France) Charles Milesi	Alpine V634 3.4 L Turbo V6	M	75	Engine
DNF	LMGT3	54	(Italy) Vista AF Corse	(Italy) Francesco Castellacci (Switzerland) Thomas Flohr (Italy) Davide Rigon	Ferrari 296 GT3	G	30	Crash
DNF	LMGT3	54	(Italy) Vista AF Corse	(Italy) Francesco Castellacci (Switzerland) Thomas Flohr (Italy) Davide Rigon	Ferrari F163CE 3.0 L Turbo V6	G	30	Crash

Tyre manufacturers
Key
Symbol	Tyre manufacturer
**G**	Goodyear
**M**	Michelin

== Championship standings after the race ==
- Only the top five positions are included for all championship standings.

2024 Hypercar World Endurance Drivers' Championship
Pos	+/-	Driver	Points
1		(France) Kévin Estre (Germany) André Lotterer (Belgium) Laurens Vanthoor	99
2	3	(Italy) Antonio Fuoco (Spain) Miguel Molina (Denmark) Nicklas Nielsen	90
3		(Japan) Kamui Kobayashi (Netherlands) Nyck de Vries	82
4	2	(United Kingdom) Callum Ilott (United Kingdom) Will Stevens	60
5	1	(Australia) Matt Campbell (Denmark) Michael Christensen (France) Frédéric Makowiecki	56

2024 Hypercar World Endurance Manufacturers' Championship
Pos	+/-	Manufacturer	Points
1		(Germany) Porsche	108
2	1	(Italy) Ferrari	99
3	1	(Japan) Toyota	96
4		(France) Alpine	23
5		(Germany) BMW	21

2024 FIA World Cup for Hypercar Teams
Pos	+/-	No.	Team	Points
1		12	(United Kingdom) Hertz Team Jota	128
2	1	99	(Germany) Proton Competition	71
3	1	83	(Italy) AF Corse	67
4		38	(United Kingdom) Hertz Team Jota	54

2024 FIA Endurance Trophy for LMGT3 Drivers
Pos	+/-	Driver	Points
1	1	(Austria) Richard Lietz (Australia) Yasser Shahin (Netherlands) Morris Schuring	75
2	1	(Austria) Klaus Bachler (Saint Kitts and Nevis) Alex Malykhin (Germany) Joel Sturm	75
3	1	(Brazil) Augusto Farfus (Indonesia) Sean Gelael (United Kingdom) Darren Leung	73
4	1	(France) Erwan Bastard (Denmark) Marco Sørensen	42
5	4	(Belgium) Sarah Bovy (Denmark) Michelle Gatting	41

2024 FIA Endurance Trophy for LMGT3 Teams
Pos	+/-	No.	Team	Points
1	5	91	(Germany) Manthey EMA	75
2	1	92	(Lithuania) Manthey PureRxcing	75
3	1	31	(Belgium) Team WRT	73
4	1	777	(Japan) D'station Racing	42
5	4	85	(Italy) Iron Dames	41

== Official recordings ==
- Full Hyperpole Session | 2024 24 Hours of Le Mans on YouTube
- Full Race | 2024 24 Hours of Le Mans on YouTube

== Notes ==
FIA World Endurance Championship
Previous race: 6 Hours of Spa-Francorchamps	2024 season	Next race: 6 Hours of São Paulo
