= 2021 GT World Challenge Australia =

Car racing series

The 2021 Fanatec GT World Challenge Australia Powered by AWS was an Australian motor sport competition for GT cars. The series incorporated the "Motorsport Australia GT Championship", the "Motorsport Australia Endurance Championship", the "GT3 Trophy Series" and the "GT4 Cup", however the Endurance Championship could not be contested due to the COVID-19 pandemic. The Motorsport Australia GT Championship was the 25th running of an Australian GT Championship. This was the first season of the championship being jointly managed by Australian Racing Group (ARG) and SRO Motorsports Group.

== Calendar ==
The provisional six-race calendar was released on 16 December 2020 with all rounds taking place in Australia. The first round at Phillip Island was postponed to 13–14 March from its original 20–21 February date, after a snap lockdown was enacted in response to an outbreak of COVID-19 cases in Melbourne. The round at Sandown and the two Endurance Championship races at Tailem Bend and Bathurst were cancelled and replaced by one round at Bathurst due to the COVID-19 pandemic.

Round	Circuit	Date	Map
1	(Victoria (state)) Phillip Island Grand Prix Circuit, Melbourne, Victoria	13–14 March	2021 GT World Challenge Australia is located in Australia
2	(New South Wales) Mount Panorama Circuit, Bathurst, NSW	3–4 April	2021 GT World Challenge Australia is located in Australia
3	(South Australia) The Bend Motorsport Park, Tailem Bend, SA	8–9 May	2021 GT World Challenge Australia is located in Australia
4	(New South Wales) Mount Panorama Circuit, Bathurst, NSW	2–3 December	2021 GT World Challenge Australia is located in Australia

== Entry list ==
Team	Car	Engine	No.	Drivers	Class	Rounds
GT3
(Australia) Melbourne Performance Centre (Note: Car No. 3 entered as OK Communication, No. 5 as Arris Property Developments, No. 9 as Hallmarc, No. 23 and 124 as KFC Racing, No. 24 as Bostik Racing, No. 33 as Perfect Auto Body, No. 65 as CoinSpot, No. 67 as Forum Group, No. 69 as Supabarn, No. 77 as Forum, No. 91 as Canon Foods and No. 777 as The Bend Motorsport Park.)	Audi R8 LMS Evo	Audi 5.2 L V10	3	(Australia) Eric Constantinidis	Am	3
(Australia) Melbourne Performance Centre	Audi R8 LMS ultra	Audi 5.2 L V10	5	(Australia) Greg Taylor	T	1–3
(Australia) Melbourne Performance Centre	Audi R8 LMS Evo	Audi 5.2 L V10	9	(Australia) Marc Cini	Am	2, 4
(Australia) Melbourne Performance Centre	Audi R8 LMS (2015)	Audi 5.2 L V10	23	(Australia) Matt Stoupas	T	1, 3
(Australia) Melbourne Performance Centre	Audi R8 LMS (2015)	Audi 5.2 L V10	23	(Australia) Max Twigg	T	2
(Australia) Melbourne Performance Centre	Audi R8 LMS Evo	Audi 5.2 L V10	24	(Australia) Tony Bates	PA	1–3
(Australia) Melbourne Performance Centre	Audi R8 LMS Evo	Audi 5.2 L V10	24	(Australia) Chaz Mostert	PA	1–2
(Australia) Melbourne Performance Centre	Audi R8 LMS Evo	Audi 5.2 L V10	24	(Australia) Dylan O'Keeffe	PA	3
(Australia) Melbourne Performance Centre	Audi R8 LMS (2015)	Audi 5.2 L V10	33	(Australia) Vince Muriti	T	1–2
(Australia) Melbourne Performance Centre	Mercedes-AMG GT3	Mercedes-AMG M159 6.2 L V8	33	(Australia) Vince Muriti	T	3
(Australia) Melbourne Performance Centre	Audi R8 LMS Evo	Audi 5.2 L V10	65	(Australia) Fraser Ross	PA	4
(Australia) Melbourne Performance Centre	Audi R8 LMS Evo	Audi 5.2 L V10	65	(Australia) Liam Talbot	PA	4
(Australia) Melbourne Performance Centre	Audi R8 LMS Evo	Audi 5.2 L V10	67	(Australia) Bill Papadimitriou	Am	3
(Australia) Melbourne Performance Centre	Audi R8 LMS Evo	Audi 5.2 L V10	69	(Australia) James Koundouris	Am	4
(Australia) Melbourne Performance Centre	Audi R8 LMS Evo	Audi 5.2 L V10	69	(Australia) Theo Koundouris	Am	4
(Australia) Melbourne Performance Centre	Audi R8 LMS ultra	Audi 5.2 L V10	77	(Australia) Vince Tesoriero	T	1, 3
(Australia) Melbourne Performance Centre	Audi R8 LMS ultra	Audi 5.2 L V10	77	(Australia) Bill Papadimitriou	T	1
(Australia) Melbourne Performance Centre	Audi R8 LMS Evo	Audi 5.2 L V10	91	(Australia) Arthur Abrahams	Am	1–3
(Australia) Melbourne Performance Centre	Audi R8 LMS (2015)	Audi 5.2 L V10	124	(Australia) Gary Higgon	T	1–3
(Australia) Melbourne Performance Centre	Audi R8 LMS (2015)	Audi 5.2 L V10	124	(Australia) Paul Stokell	T	1–3
(Australia) Melbourne Performance Centre	Audi R8 LMS Evo	Audi 5.2 L V10	124	(Australia) Gary Higgon	Am	4
(Australia) Melbourne Performance Centre	Audi R8 LMS Evo	Audi 5.2 L V10	124	(Australia) Paul Stokell	Am	4
(Australia) Melbourne Performance Centre	Audi R8 LMS Evo	Audi 5.2 L V10	777	(Australia) Yasser Shahin	PA	All
(Australia) Melbourne Performance Centre	Audi R8 LMS Evo	Audi 5.2 L V10	777	(Australia) Garth Tander	PA	1–3
(Australia) Melbourne Performance Centre	Audi R8 LMS Evo	Audi 5.2 L V10	777	(Germany) Christopher Mies	PA	4
(Australia) Grove Racing	Porsche 911 GT3 R	Porsche 4.0 L Flat-6	4	(Australia) Brenton Grove	PA	All
(Australia) Grove Racing	Porsche 911 GT3 R	Porsche 4.0 L Flat-6	4	(Australia) Stephen Grove	PA	All
(Australia) Wall Racing	Lamborghini 5.2 L V10	Lamborghini Huracán GT3 Evo	6	(Australia) Adrian Deitz	PA	2
(Australia) Wall Racing	Lamborghini 5.2 L V10	Lamborghini Huracán GT3 Evo	6	(Australia) David Wall	PA	2
(Australia) Keltic Racing	Aston Martin Vantage AMR GT3	Aston Martin M177 4.0 L Turbo V8	7	(Australia) Tony Quinn	Am	1–3
(Australia) Team BRM (Note: Entered as What do you meme?)	Audi R8 LMS ultra	Audi 5.2 L V10	17	(Australia) Mark Rosser	T	3
(Australia) Team BRM	Audi R8 LMS Evo	Audi 5.2 L V10	17	(Spain) Roberto Merhi	PA	4
(Australia) Team BRM	Audi R8 LMS Evo	Audi 5.2 L V10	17	(Australia) Mark Rosser	PA	4
(Australia) KMB Motorsport	Aston Martin V12 Vantage GT3 (Note: Michael Bailey initially entered a Bentley Continental GT3 (2017) for the final round at Bathurst, but he wrote that car off in a crash in a practice session. He then switched back to the Aston Martin V12 Vantage GT3 for qualifying and the races.)	Aston Martin V12 Vantage GT3	38	(Australia) Michael Bailey	T	All
GWR Australia/RAM Motorsport (Note: Car No. 45 entered as RAM Motorsport, No. 96 as Hobson Motorsport.)	Mercedes-AMG GT3 Evo	Mercedes-AMG M159 6.2 L V8	45	(Australia) Mike Sheargold	Am	4
GWR Australia/RAM Motorsport	Mercedes-AMG GT3 Evo	Mercedes-AMG M159 6.2 L V8	45	(Australia) Garth Walden	Am	4
GWR Australia/RAM Motorsport	Nissan GT-R Nismo GT3 (2015)	Nissan GT-R Nismo GT3 (2015)	96	(Australia) Brett Hobson	T	All
(Australia) Mack Brothers Racing	Ferrari 458 Italia GT3	Ferrari 4.5 L V8	47	(Australia) Wayne Mack	T	1
(Australia) AMAC Motorsport	Lamborghini Huracán GT3 Evo	Lamborghini 5.2 L V10	51	(Australia) Andrew Macpherson	Am	1–3
(Australia) AMAC Motorsport	Lamborghini Huracán GT3 Evo	Lamborghini 5.2 L V10	51	(Australia) Ben Porter	Am	1–3
(Australia) AMAC Motorsport	Porsche 911 GT3 R (2017)	Porsche 4.0 L Flat-6	51	(Australia) Andrew Macpherson	Am	4
(Australia) AMAC Motorsport	Porsche 911 GT3 R (2017)	Porsche 4.0 L Flat-6	51	(Australia) Ben Porter	Am	4
(Australia) Schumacher Motorsport	Audi R8 LMS ultra	Audi 5.2 L V10	55	(Australia) Brad Schumacher	T	1–3
(Australia) Schumacher Motorsport	Audi R8 LMS (2015)	Audi 5.2 L V10	55	(Australia) Brad Schumacher	T	4
(Australia) Dale Paterson Motorsport	Chevrolet Camaro SS GT3	LS7 V8 7.9 L	71	(Australia) Dale Paterson	T	1
(Australia) Maranello Motorsport	Ferrari 488 GT3	Ferrari 3.9 L V8	88	(Australia) Adrian Deitz	Am	1
(Australia) Maranello Motorsport	Ferrari 488 GT3	Ferrari 3.9 L V8	88	(Australia) Peter Edwards	Am	1
(Australia) Industrie	Audi R8 LMS ultra	Audi 5.2 L V10	99	(Australia) Nick Kelly	T	1
(Australia) Industrie	Mercedes-AMG M159 6.2 L V8	Mercedes-AMG GT3	99	(Australia) Nick Kelly	T	2–3
(Australia) Scott Taylor Motorsport	Porsche 911 GT3 R (997)	Porsche 4.0 L Flat-6	222	(Australia) Scott Taylor	T	4
(Malaysia) JMR Triple Eight Race Engineering	Mercedes-AMG GT3 Evo	Mercedes-AMG M159 6.2 L V8	888	(Malaysia) Prince Jefri Ibrahim	PA	All
(Malaysia) JMR Triple Eight Race Engineering	Mercedes-AMG GT3 Evo	Mercedes-AMG M159 6.2 L V8	888	(Australia) Jamie Whincup	PA	1
(Malaysia) JMR Triple Eight Race Engineering	Mercedes-AMG GT3 Evo	Mercedes-AMG M159 6.2 L V8	888	(New Zealand) Shane van Gisbergen	PA	2
(Malaysia) JMR Triple Eight Race Engineering	Mercedes-AMG GT3 Evo	Mercedes-AMG M159 6.2 L V8	888	(Australia) Broc Feeney	PA	3
(Malaysia) JMR Triple Eight Race Engineering	Mercedes-AMG GT3 Evo	Mercedes-AMG M159 6.2 L V8	888	(Australia) Peter Hackett	PA	4
GT4
(Australia) Nineteen Motorsport	Mercedes-AMG GT4	Mercedes-AMG M178 4.0 L V8	19	(Australia) Mark Griffith	GT4	1–2, 4

Icon	Class
PA	Pro-Am Cup
Am	Am Cup
T	Trophy Cup
GT4	GT4 Cup

== Race results ==
Bold indicates the overall winner.

Round		Circuit	Pole position	Pro-Am winners	Am winners	Trophy winners	GT4 winners
1	R1	(Victoria (state)) Phillip Island	(Australia) No. 24 Melbourne Performance Centre	**(Australia) No. 777 Melbourne Performance Centre**	(Australia) No. 7 Keltic Racing	(Australia) No. 23 Melbourne Performance Centre	No Starters
1	R1	(Victoria (state)) Phillip Island	(Australia) Tony Bates (Australia) Chaz Mostert	**(Australia) Yasser Shahin** **(Australia) Garth Tander**	(Australia) Tony Quinn	(Australia) Matt Stoupas	No Starters
1	R2	(Victoria (state)) Phillip Island	(Australia) No. 777 Melbourne Performance Centre	**(Australia) No. 777 Melbourne Performance Centre**	(Australia) No. 91 Melbourne Performance Centre	No. 96 GWR Australia/RAM Motorsport	No Starters
1	R2	(Victoria (state)) Phillip Island	(Australia) Yasser Shahin (Australia) Garth Tander	**(Australia) Yasser Shahin** **(Australia) Garth Tander**	(Australia) Arthur Abrahams	(Australia) Brett Hobson	No Starters
2	R1	(New South Wales) Bathurst	(Australia) No. 777 Melbourne Performance Centre	**(Malaysia) No. 888 JMR Triple Eight Race Engineering**	(Australia) No. 7 Keltic Racing	(Australia) No. 55 Schumacher Motorsport	(Australia) No. 19 Nineteen Motorsport
2	R1	(New South Wales) Bathurst	(Australia) Yasser Shahin (Australia) Garth Tander	**(New Zealand) Shane van Gisbergen** **(Malaysia) Prince Jefri Ibrahim**	(Australia) Tony Quinn	(Australia) Brad Schumacher	(Australia) Mark Griffith
2	R2	(New South Wales) Bathurst	(Malaysia) No. 888 JMR Triple Eight Race Engineering	**(Australia) No. 777 Melbourne Performance Centre**	(Australia) No. 7 Keltic Racing	(Australia) No. 55 Schumacher Motorsport	(Australia) No. 19 Nineteen Motorsport
2	R2	(New South Wales) Bathurst	(New Zealand) Shane van Gisbergen (Malaysia) Prince Jefri Ibrahim	**(Australia) Yasser Shahin** **(Australia) Garth Tander**	(Australia) Tony Quinn	(Australia) Brad Schumacher	(Australia) Mark Griffith
3	R1	(South Australia) Tailem Bend	(Australia) No. 777 Melbourne Performance Centre	(Australia) No. 777 Melbourne Performance Centre	(Australia) No. 51 AMAC Motorsport	**No. 96 GWR Australia/RAM Motorsport**	No Entries
3	R1	(South Australia) Tailem Bend	(Australia) Yasser Shahin (Australia) Garth Tander	(Australia) Yasser Shahin (Australia) Garth Tander	(Australia) Andrew Macpherson (Australia) Ben Porter	**(Australia) Brett Hobson**	No Entries
3	R2	(South Australia) Tailem Bend	(Malaysia) No. 888 JMR Triple Eight Race Engineering	**(Australia) No. 777 Melbourne Performance Centre**	(Australia) No. 51 AMAC Motorsport	(Australia) No. 55 Schumacher Motorsport	No Entries
3	R2	(South Australia) Tailem Bend	(Australia) Broc Feeney (Malaysia) Prince Jefri Ibrahim	**(Australia) Yasser Shahin** **(Australia) Garth Tander**	(Australia) Andrew Macpherson (Australia) Ben Porter	(Australia) Brad Schumacher	No Entries
4	R1	(New South Wales) Bathurst	(Australia) No. 65 Melbourne Performance Centre	**(Australia) No. 777 Melbourne Performance Centre**	(Australia) No. 124 Melbourne Performance Centre	No. 96 GWR Australia/RAM Motorsport	(Australia) No. 19 Nineteen Motorsport
4	R1	(New South Wales) Bathurst	(Australia) Fraser Ross (Australia) Liam Talbot	**(Germany) Christopher Mies** **(Australia) Yasser Shahin**	(Australia) Gary Higgon (Australia) Paul Stokell	(Australia) Brett Hobson	(Australia) Mark Griffith
4	R2	(New South Wales) Bathurst	(Australia) No. 4 Grove Racing	**(Australia) No. 65 Melbourne Performance Centre**	(Australia) No. 9 Melbourne Performance Centre	No. 96 GWR Australia/RAM Motorsport	(Australia) No. 19 Nineteen Motorsport
4	R2	(New South Wales) Bathurst	(Australia) Brenton Grove (Australia) Stephen Grove	**(Australia) Fraser Ross** **(Australia) Liam Talbot**	(Australia) Marc Cini	(Australia) Brett Hobson	(Australia) Mark Griffith

== Championship standings ==
Scoring system

Position	**1st**	**2nd**	**3rd**	**4th**	**5th**	**6th**	**7th**	**8th**	**9th**	**10th**
Points	25	18	15	12	10	8	6	4	2	1

=== Pro-Am Cup ===
Pos	Driver	Team	PHI (Victoria (state))		BAT (New South Wales)		BEN (South Australia)		BAT (New South Wales)		Points
1	(Australia) Yasser Shahin	(Australia) Melbourne Performance Centre	1	**1**	**2**	1	**1**	1	1	2	186
2	(Australia) Garth Tander	(Australia) Melbourne Performance Centre	1	**1**	**2**	1	**1**	1			143
3	(Malaysia) Prince Jefri Ibrahim	(Malaysia) JMR Triple Eight Race Engineering	2	3	1	**2**	3	**3**	3	Ret	121
4	(Australia) Brenton Grove (Australia) Stephen Grove	(Australia) Grove Racing	4	2	4	4	4	2	4	**3**	111
5	(Australia) Tony Bates	(Australia) Melbourne Performance Centre	**3**	4	3	3	2	4			87
6	(Australia) Chaz Mostert	(Australia) Melbourne Performance Centre	**3**	4	3	3					57
7	(New Zealand) Shane van Gisbergen	(Malaysia) JMR Triple Eight Race Engineering			1	**2**					43
8	(Germany) Christopher Mies	(Australia) Melbourne Performance Centre							1	2	43
9	(Australia) Fraser Ross (Australia) Liam Talbot	(Australia) Melbourne Performance Centre							**2**	1	43
10	(Australia) Jamie Whincup	(Malaysia) JMR Triple Eight Race Engineering	2	3							33
11	(Australia) Dylan O'Keeffe	(Australia) Melbourne Performance Centre					2	4			30
12	(Australia) Broc Feeney	(Malaysia) JMR Triple Eight Race Engineering					3	**3**			30
13	(Australia) Adrian Deitz (Australia) David Wall	(Australia) Wall Racing			5	5					20
14	(Australia) Peter Hackett	(Malaysia) JMR Triple Eight Race Engineering							3	Ret	15
15	(Spain) Roberto Merhi (Australia) Mark Rosser	(Australia) Team BRM							Ret	4	12
Pos	Driver	Team	PHI (Victoria (state))		BAT (New South Wales)		BEN (South Australia)		BAT (New South Wales)		Points

Key
Colour	Result
Gold	Race winner
Silver	2nd place
Bronze	3rd place
Green	Points finish
Blue	Non-points finish
Blue	Non-classified finish (NC)
Purple	Did not finish (Ret)
Black	Disqualified (DSQ)
Black	Excluded (EX)
White	Did not start (DNS)
White	Race cancelled (C)
White	Withdrew (WD)
Blank	Did not participate

**Bold** – Pole
Italics – Fastest lap

=== Am Cup ===
Pos	Driver	Team	PHI (Victoria (state))		BAT (New South Wales)		BEN (South Australia)		BAT (New South Wales)		Points
1	(Australia) Andrew Macpherson (Australia) Ben Porter	(Australia) AMAC Motorsport	**3**	3	2	2	1	**1**	3	Ret	131
2	(Australia) Tony Quinn	(Australia) Keltic Racing	1	**2**	**1**	**1**	**2**	Ret			111
3	(Australia) Arthur Abrahams	(Australia) Melbourne Performance Centre	2	1	3	Ret	4	2			88
4	(Australia) Marc Cini	(Australia) Melbourne Performance Centre			4	3			4	1	64
5	(Australia) Gary Higgon (Australia) Paul Stokell	(Australia) Melbourne Performance Centre							1	**3**	40
6	(Australia) Mike Sheargold (Australia) Garth Walden	GWR Australia/RAM Motorsport							2	2	36
7	(Australia) Bill Papadimitriou	(Australia) Melbourne Performance Centre					3	4			27
—	(Australia) James Koundouris (Australia) Theo Koundouris	(Australia) Melbourne Performance Centre							**Ret**	Ret	0
—	(Australia) Adrian Deitz (Australia) Peter Edwards	(Australia) Maranello Motorsport	Ret	DNS							0
Entries ineligible to score points
—	(Australia) Eric Constantinidis	(Australia) Melbourne Performance Centre					5	3			0
Pos	Driver	Team	PHI (Victoria (state))		BAT (New South Wales)		BEN (South Australia)		BAT (New South Wales)		Points

=== Trophy Cup ===
Pos	Driver	Team	PHI (Victoria (state))		BAT (New South Wales)		BEN (South Australia)		BAT (New South Wales)		Points
1	(Australia) Brad Schumacher	(Australia) Schumacher Motorsport	**2**	Ret	1	1	**4**	1	2	3	138
2	(Australia) Brett Hobson	GWR Australia/RAM Motorsport	3	1	**3**	DNS	1	Ret	**1**	**1**	130
3	(Australia) Michael Bailey	(Australia) KMB Motorsport	Ret	DNS	6	4	9	5	3	2	65
4	(Australia) Greg Taylor	(Australia) Melbourne Performance Centre	5	4	4	Ret	2	4			64
5	(Australia) Nick Kelly	(Australia) Industrie	4	Ret	5	3	6	2			63
6	(Australia) Matt Stoupas	(Australia) Melbourne Performance Centre	1	**DSQ**			5	3			50
7	(Australia) Max Twigg	(Australia) Melbourne Performance Centre			2	2					36
8	(Australia) Gary Higgon (Australia) Paul Stokell	(Australia) Melbourne Performance Centre	Ret	3	7	**5**	8	**Ret**			35
9	(Australia) Dale Paterson	(Australia) Dale Paterson Motorsport	7	2							24
10	(Australia) Scott Taylor	(Australia) Scott Taylor Motorsport							4	4	24
11	(Australia) Vince Muriti	(Australia) Melbourne Performance Centre	6	Ret	WD	WD	7	6			22
12	(Australia) Vince Tesoriero	(Australia) Melbourne Performance Centre	8	5			Ret	7			20
13	(Australia) Mark Rosser	(Australia) Team BRM					3	Ret			15
14	(Australia) Bill Papadimitriou	(Australia) Melbourne Performance Centre	8	5							14
-	(Australia) Wayne Mack	(Australia) Mack Brothers Racing	Ret	DNS							0
Pos	Driver	Team	PHI (Victoria (state))		BAT (New South Wales)		BEN (South Australia)		BAT (New South Wales)		Points

=== GT4 Cup ===
Pos	Driver	Team	PHI (Victoria (state))		BAT (New South Wales)		BEN (South Australia)	BAT (New South Wales)		Points
1	(Australia) Mark Griffith	(Australia) Nineteen Motorsport	WD	WD	**1**	**1**		**1**	**1**	100
Pos	Driver	Team	PHI (Victoria (state))		BAT (New South Wales)		BEN (South Australia)	BAT (New South Wales)		Points

== See also ==
- 2021 GT World Challenge Europe
- 2021 GT World Challenge Europe Sprint Cup
- 2021 GT World Challenge Europe Endurance Cup
- 2021 GT World Challenge Asia
- 2021 GT World Challenge America
