= Yasser Shahin =

Australian-Palestinian racing driver

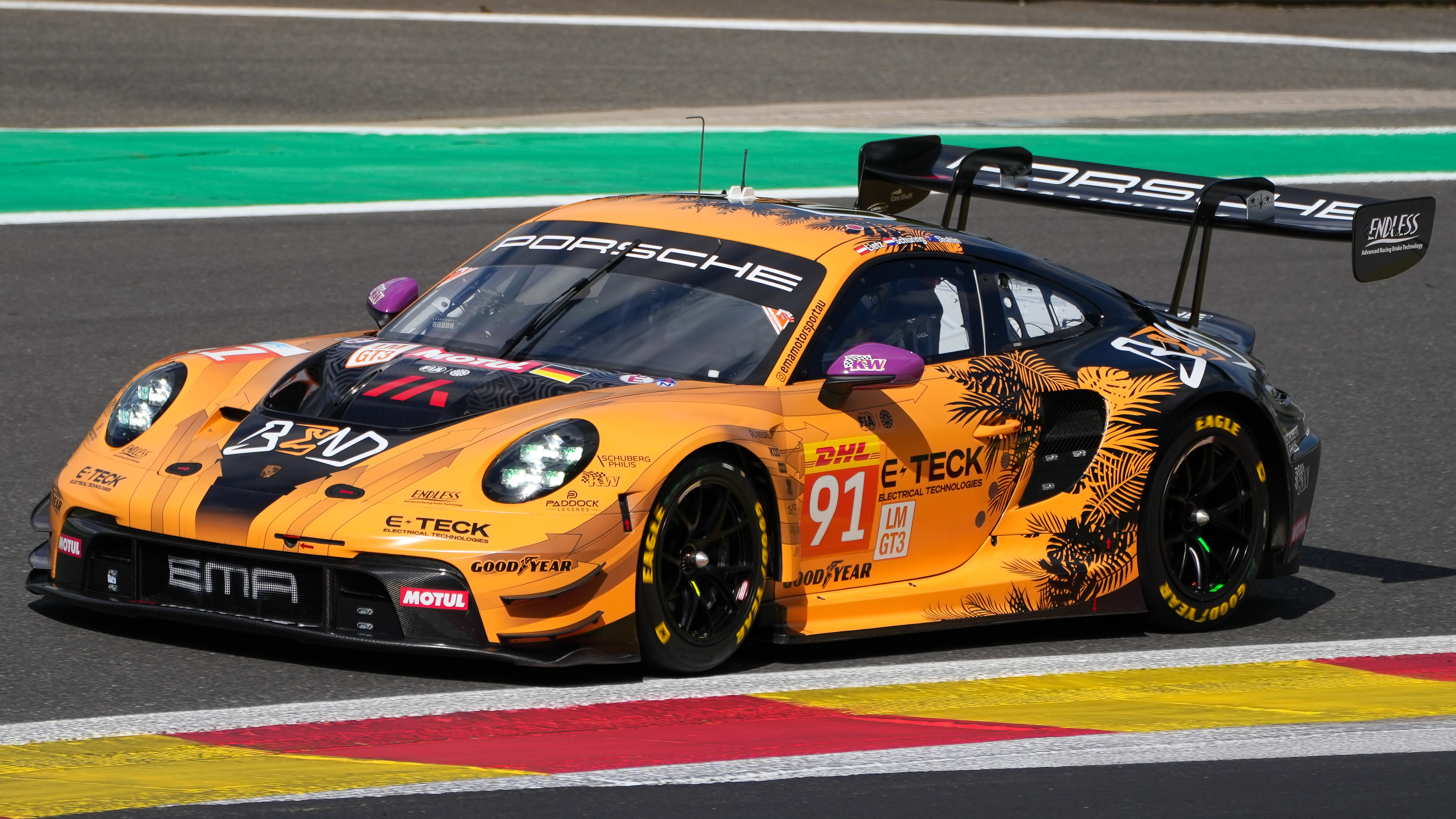
- The No. 91 Porsche 911 GT3 R, driven by Yasser Shahin, at the 2024 6 Hours of Spa-Francorchamps
- Nationality: Australian; Palestinian via dual nationality
- Born: 24 October 1976 (age 50) Adelaide, Australia

FIA World Endurance Championship – LMGT3
- Categorisation: FIA Bronze
- Years active: 2024
- Teams: Team WRT
- Car number: 31
- Former teams: Manthey EMA
- Starts: 8
- Wins: 3
- Poles: 0
- Fastest laps: 0
- Best finish: 2024 in 2nd

Previous series
- 2013–2014 2015, 2018 2016–2019, 2021–2023 2018–2019 2019 2019 2019, 2022 2020 2022 2023: Australian Sports Racer Series; Radical Australia Cup; GT World Challenge Australia Audi R8 LMS Cup; Cue Enduro Super Series; GT World Challenge Europe Endurance Cup; Intercontinental GT Challenge; Gulf Radical Cup; GT World Challenge Asia; Asian Le Mans Series

Championship titles
- 2019 2021, 2022: Audi R8 LMS Cup; GT World Challenge Australia

Yasser Shahin (born 24 September 1976 in Lebanon) is an Australian-Palestinian racing driver and businessman, currently competing in the FIA World Endurance Championship.

Shahin is a two-time GT World Challenge Australia champion and a director of the Peregrine Corporation alongside brother and fellow racing driver Sam, a company which owns mostly South Australian companies including The Bend Motorsport Park.

In 2024, Shahin became the first LMGT3 category winner of the 24 Hours of Le Mans, taking the victory alongside Richard Lietz and Morris Schuring.

== Career results ==
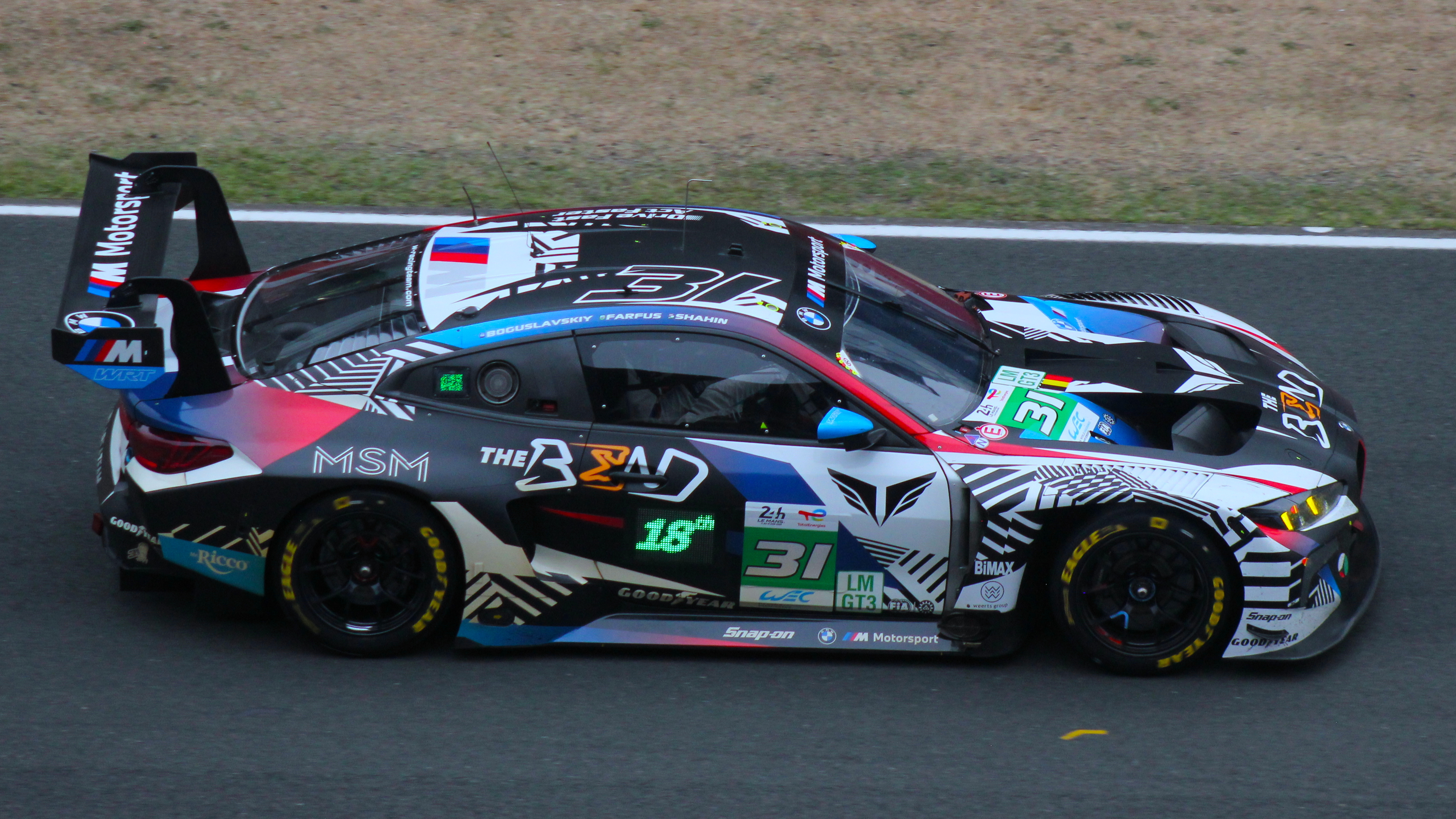
Shahin's No. 31 car at the 2025 24 Hours of Le Mans

=== Summary ===
Season	Series	Position	Team	Car
2013	Australian Sports Racer Series	17th	Yasser Shahin	Radical SR3
2014	Australian Sports Racer Series	15th	Peregrine Corporation	Radical SR3
2015	Radical Australia Series	18th	Peregrine Corporation	Radical SR3
2016	Australian GT Championship	NC	Peregrine Corporation	Lamborghini Gallardo R-EX
2017	Australian GT Championship	11th	M Motorsport	Lamborghini Gallardo R-EX
2018	Audi R8 LMS Cup	3rd	Melbourne Performance Centre	Audi R8 LMS GT3
2018	Australian GT Championship	18th	Peregrine Corporation	Mercedes-AMG GT3
2018	Radical Australia Cup	8th	Peregrine Corporation	Radical SR3
2019	Audi R8 LMS Cup	1st	Peregrine Corporation	Audi R8 LMS GT3
2019	Cue Enduro Super Series	19th	Peregrine Corporation	Audi R8 LMS GT3 Evo
2019	Australian GT Championship	11th	Peregrine Corporation	Mercedes-AMG GT3
2019	Blancpain GT Series Endurance Cup - Am	29th	Audi Sport R8 LMS Cup	Audi R8 LMS GT3 Evo
2020	Gulf Radical Cup	23rd	?	Radical SR3
2021	GT World Challenge Australia	1st	Melbourne Performance Centre	Audi R8 LMS GT3 Evo
2022	GT World Challenge Australia	1st	Melbourne Performance Centre	Audi R8 LMS GT3 Evo2
2022	GT World Challenge Asia	20th	Team X Works	Audi R8 LMS GT3 Evo2
2023	Asian Le Mans Series - LMP2	7th	United Autosports	Oreca 07
2023	GT World Challenge Australia	3rd	EMA Motorsport	Porsche 911 GT3 R
2024	FIA World Endurance Championship - GT3	2nd	Manthey Racing / EMA Motorsport	Porsche 911 GT3 R
2024	Lamborghini Super Trofeo Asia	NE	Absolute Racing	Lamborghini Huracán Super Trofeo Evo2
2025	FIA World Endurance Championship - GT3	10th	Team WRT	BMW M4 GT3

=== Bathurst 12 Hour results ===
Year	Team	Co-drivers	Car	Class	Laps	Overall position	Class position
2018	(Australia) Peregrine Corporation	(Czech Republic) Tomáš Enge (Australia) Luke Youlden	Lamborghini Gallardo R-EX	Pro-Am	219	DNF	
2019	(Australia) Scott Taylor Motorsport (Australia) Erebus Motorsport	(Australia) David Reynolds (Australia) Luke Youlden	Mercedes-AMG GT3	Pro-Am	156	DNF	
2020	(Australia) Triple Eight Race Engineering	(Australia) Anton de Pasquale (Australia) Nick Foster (Australia) Sam Shahin	Mercedes-AMG GT3	Pro-Am	0	WD	
2022	(Australia) Melbourne Performance Centre	(Switzerland) Ricardo Feller (Germany) Markus Winkelhock	Audi R8 LMS GT3 Evo2	Pro-Am	285	7th	7th
2023	(Australia) Melbourne Performance Centre	(Switzerland) Ricardo Feller (Germany) Christopher Mies	Audi R8 LMS GT3 Evo2	Pro-Am	320	9th	2nd
2024	(Germany) Manthey Racing / (Australia) EMA Motorsport	(United Kingdom) Harry King (Belgium) Alessio Picariello	Porsche 911 GT3 R (992)	Pro-Am	274	9th	1st
2025	(Germany) Manthey Racing / (Australia) EMA Motorsport	(Germany) Laurin Heinrich (Netherlands) Morris Schuring (Australia) Sam Shahin	Porsche 911 GT3 R (992)	Pro-Am	303	10th	2nd

=== Complete FIA World Endurance Championship results ===
Year	Entrant	Class	Chassis	Engine	1	2	3	4	5	6	7	8	Rank	Points
2024	Manthey EMA	LMGT3	Porsche 911 GT3 R (992)	Porsche 4.2 L Flat-6	QAT; 15	IMO; 16	SPA; 1	LMS; 1	SÃO; 12	COA; 3	FUJ; 14	BHR; 5	2nd	105
2025	The Bend Team WRT	LMGT3	BMW M4 GT3	BMW P58 3.0 L I6 t	QAT; 3	IMO; 12	SPA; Ret	LMS; Ret	SÃO; 12	COA; 9	FUJ; 3	BHR; 7	10th	49
2026	The Bend Manthey	LMGT3	Porsche 911 GT3 R (992.2)	Porsche M97/80 4.2 L Flat-6	IMO; 3	SPA; 3	LMS; 9	SÃO; 3	COA; 15	FUJ; 12	CAT; 1	MNZ; 1	3rd	99

=== Complete 24 Hours of Le Mans results ===
Year	Team	Co-drivers	Car	Class	Laps	Pos.	Class pos.
2024	(Germany) Manthey Racing / (Australia) EMA Motorsport	(Austria) Richard Lietz (Netherlands) Morris Schuring	Porsche 911 GT3 R (992)	LMGT3	281	27th	1st
2025	(Belgium) The Bend Team WRT	Timur Boguslavskiy (Brazil) Augusto Farfus	BMW M4 GT3 Evo	LMGT3	168	DNF	DNF
2026	(Germany) The Bend Manthey	(Austria) Richard Lietz (Italy) Riccardo Pera	Porsche 911 GT3 R (992.2)	LMGT3	330	45th	13th
