= 2016 Bathurst 1000 =

Motor race in Australia

2016 Supercheap Auto Bathurst 1000

Seasons
- ← 2015 2017 →

(New South Wales) 2016 Supercheap Auto Bathurst 1000
Event Information
- Round 11 of 14 in the 2016 International V8 Supercars Championship
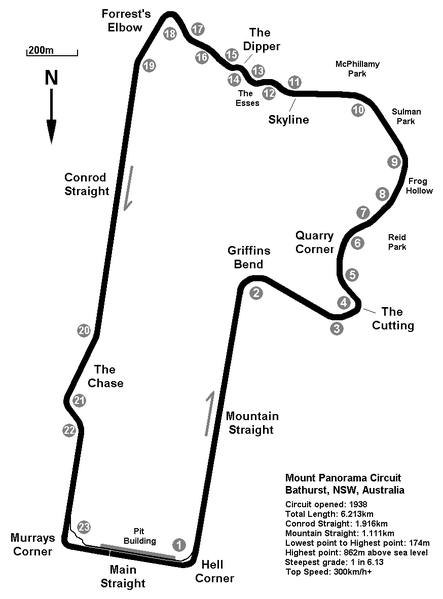
- Date: 6–9 October 2016
- Location: Bathurst, New South Wales
- Venue: Mount Panorama Circuit
- Weather: Thursday: fine Friday: fine Saturday: fine Sunday: fine, overcast

Results
Race 1
Distance	161 laps	1000 km
Pole position	Jamie Whincup; Triple Eight Race Engineering	2:05.4263
Winner	Will Davison; Jonathon Webb; Tekno Autosports	6:19:25.3237

The 2016 Supercheap Auto Bathurst 1000 was a motor racing event for Supercars, held on the weekend of 6 to 9 October 2016. The event was held at the Mount Panorama Circuit near Bathurst, New South Wales, and consisted of one race of 1000 kilometres in length. It was the eleventh event of fourteen in the 2016 International V8 Supercars Championship and hosted Race 21 of the season. It was also the second event of the 2016 Pirtek Enduro Cup. The event marked ten years since the first awarding of the Peter Brock Trophy, which was introduced following the death of nine-time race winner Peter Brock in September 2006.

Triple Eight Race Engineering drivers Jamie Whincup and Paul Dumbrell started the race from pole position. The race was won by Tekno Autosports' Will Davison and Jonathon Webb. Whincup had taken the chequered flag first, but a post-race 15-second time penalty relegated him to eleventh position. Shane van Gisbergen and Alexandre Prémat finished second for Triple Eight, with the Lucas Dumbrell Motorsport entry of Nick Percat and Cameron McConville completing the podium.

An appeal to the time penalty imposed on Whincup was lodged by Triple Eight Race Engineering but dismissed nine days after the race.

== Report ==
=== Background ===
The event was the 59th running of the Bathurst 1000, which was first held at the Phillip Island Grand Prix Circuit in 1960 as a 500-mile race for Australian-made standard production sedans, and marked the 56th time that the race was held at Mount Panorama. It was the 20th running of the Australian 1000 race, which was first held after the organisational split between the Australian Racing Drivers Club and V8 Supercars Australia that saw two "Bathurst 1000" races contested in both 1997 and 1998. It was the 18th time the race had been held as part of the Supercars Championship and the fourth time it formed part of the Enduro Cup. The defending winners of the race were Craig Lowndes and Steven Richards.

The event commemorated ten years since the death of nine-time race winner Peter Brock—who died in a crash at the Targa West rally one month prior to the 2006 race—and the introduction of the Peter Brock Trophy. Brock's brother Phil presented the Trophy to the race winners, having made the first presentation of the Trophy in 2006. Several of Brock's old race cars were on display at the event, with a selection completing parade laps prior to the race on Sunday morning. The cars in the parade were driven by Phil Brock and the previous winners of the Peter Brock Trophy. The event also paid tribute to Mark Porter, who died following a crash in a support race during the 2006 event.

Shane van Gisbergen entered the event as the championship leader, seven points clear of his Triple Eight Race Engineering teammate Jamie Whincup. Lowndes, the third Triple Eight driver, was third in the points standings, 157 behind Van Gisbergen. In the Teams' Championship, Triple Eight Race Engineering hold a 1273-point lead over the Holden Racing Team. In the Enduro Cup standings, Holden Racing Team drivers Garth Tander and Warren Luff lead the Triple Eight pairing of Van Gisbergen and Alexandre Prémat by 24 points.

==== Entry list ====
As well as the regular 26 championship entries, a single wildcard entry was received for the race. The Harvey Norman Supergirls entry that contested the 2015 race returned for 2016, fielding an unchanged line-up of Simona de Silvestro and Renee Gracie. The entry switched from competing with a Prodrive Racing Australia-prepared Ford Falcon FG X to a Nissan Altima L33 built by Kelly Racing.

No.	Drivers	Team (Sponsor)	Car	No.	Drivers	Team (Sponsor)	Car
1	(Australia) Mark Winterbottom (Australia) Dean Canto	Prodrive Racing Australia (The Bottle-O)	Ford Falcon FG X	21	(Australia) Tim Blanchard (Australia) Macauley Jones	Britek Motorsport (CoolDrive)	Holden Commodore VF
2	(Australia) Garth Tander (Australia) Warren Luff	Holden Racing Team (Holden)	Holden Commodore VF	22	(Australia) James Courtney (Australia) Jack Perkins	Holden Racing Team (Holden)	Holden Commodore VF
3	(New Zealand) Andre Heimgartner (Australia) Aaren Russell	Lucas Dumbrell Motorsport (Plus Fitness)	Holden Commodore VF	23	(Australia) Michael Caruso (Australia) Dean Fiore	Nissan Motorsport (Nissan)	Nissan Altima L33
4	(Australia) Shae Davies (New Zealand) Chris van der Drift	Erebus Motorsport (UltraAir Air Conditioning)	Holden Commodore VF	33	(New Zealand) Scott McLaughlin (Australia) David Wall	Garry Rogers Motorsport (Wilson Security)	Volvo S60
6	(Australia) Cam Waters (Australia) Jack Le Brocq	Prodrive Racing Australia (Monster Energy)	Ford Falcon FG X	34	(Australia) James Moffat (Australia) James Golding	Garry Rogers Motorsport (Wilson Security)	Volvo S60
7	(Australia) Todd Kelly (Australia) Matthew Campbell	Nissan Motorsport (carsales.com)	Nissan Altima L33	55	(Australia) Chaz Mostert (Australia) Steve Owen	Rod Nash Racing (Supercheap Auto)	Ford Falcon FG X
8	(Australia) Jason Bright (Australia) Andrew Jones	Brad Jones Racing (BOC Gas and Gear)	Holden Commodore VF	88	(Australia) Jamie Whincup (Australia) Paul Dumbrell	Triple Eight Race Engineering (Red Bull)	Holden Commodore VF
9	(Australia) David Reynolds (New Zealand) Craig Baird	Erebus Motorsport (Penrite)	Holden Commodore VF	96	(Australia) Dale Wood (Australia) David Russell	Nissan Motorsport (ADVAM, GB Galvanising)	Nissan Altima L33
12	(New Zealand) Fabian Coulthard (Australia) Luke Youlden	DJR Team Penske (Shell V-Power)	Ford Falcon FG X	97	(New Zealand) Shane van Gisbergen (France) Alexandre Prémat	Triple Eight Race Engineering (Red Bull)	Holden Commodore VF
14	(Australia) Tim Slade (Australia) Ashley Walsh	Brad Jones Racing (Freightliner)	Holden Commodore VF	111	(New Zealand) Chris Pither (New Zealand) Richie Stanaway	Super Black Racing (Ice Break Coffee)	Ford Falcon FG X
15	(Australia) Rick Kelly (Australia) Russell Ingall	Nissan Motorsport (Sengled)	Nissan Altima L33	222	(Australia) Nick Percat (Australia) Cameron McConville	Lucas Dumbrell Motorsport (2017 Clipsal 500 Adelaide)	Holden Commodore VF
17	(Australia) Scott Pye (Australia) Tony D'Alberto	DJR Team Penske (Shell V-Power)	Ford Falcon FG X	360	(Switzerland) Simona de Silvestro (Australia) Renee Gracie	Nissan Motorsport (Harvey Norman, Nikon)	Nissan Altima L33
18	(Australia) Lee Holdsworth (Australia) Karl Reindler	Charlie Schwerkolt Racing (Preston Hire)	Holden Commodore VF	888	(Australia) Craig Lowndes (New Zealand) Steven Richards	Triple Eight Race Engineering (Caltex)	Holden Commodore VF
19	(Australia) Will Davison (Australia) Jonathon Webb	Tekno Autosports (Darrell Lea STIX)	Holden Commodore VF				

Entries with a grey background were wildcard entries which did not compete in the full championship season.

=== Practice ===
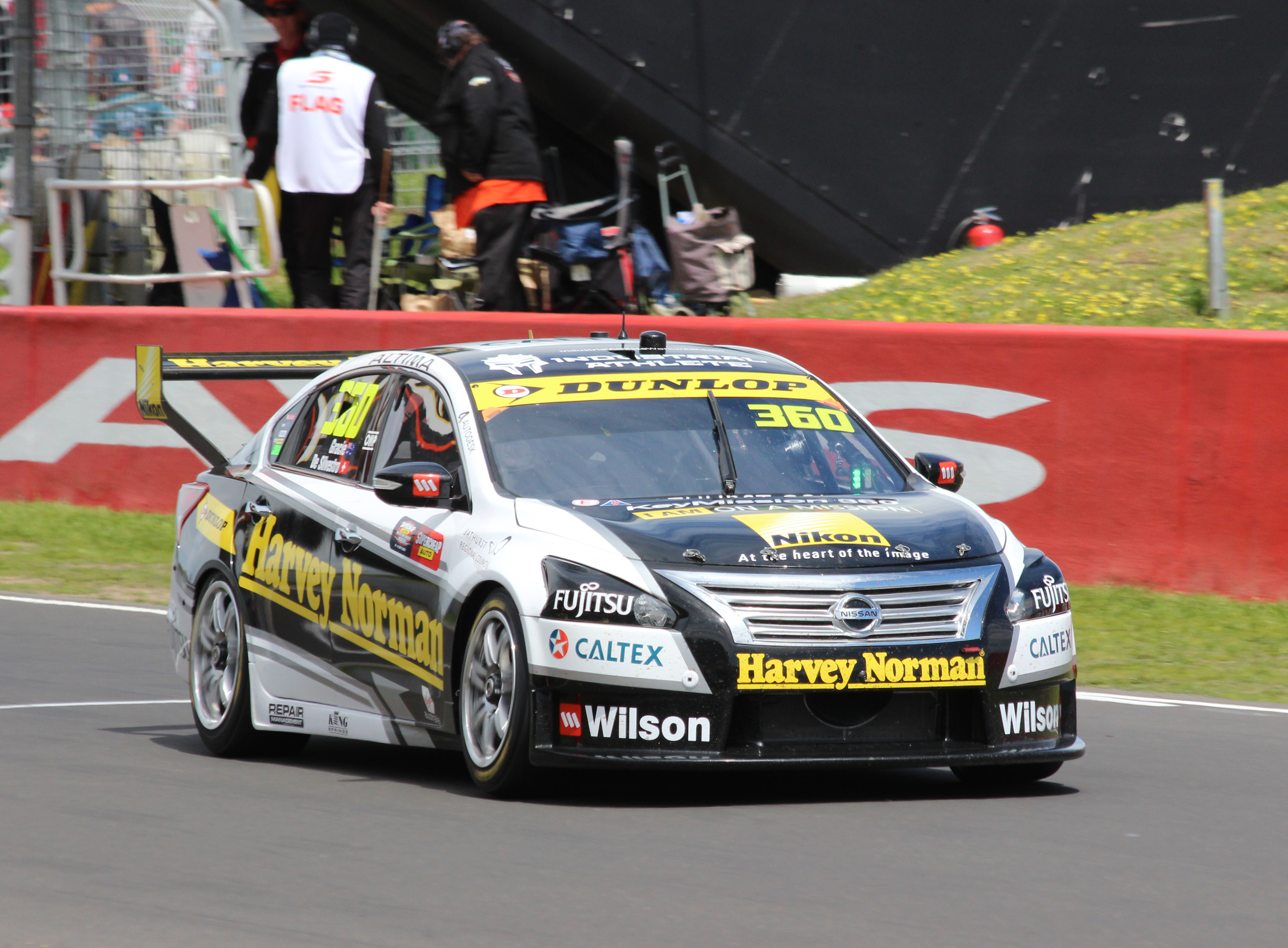
Simona de Silvestro and Renee Gracie joined the grid as a wildcard entry for the second consecutive year.

Three one-hour practice sessions were held on the Thursday prior to the race. Practice 1 and Practice 3 were open to both regular drivers and co-drivers, while Practice 2 was for co-drivers only. The first session was contested mainly by regular drivers, with Whincup setting the fastest lap time of 2:05.9500. He had earlier caused a red flag after spinning at the final corner and getting stuck in the sand trap. Coulthard was second fastest, more than half a second behind, ahead of Slade. The car of Pye sustained damage when Pye spun at McPhillamy Park and went backwards into the tyre wall. Despite the damage, Pye was able to return to the pit lane. Courtney brushed the inside wall at Turn 13 early in the session but did not incur any significant damage. Rick Kelly and Mostert completed minimal laps, with both of their cars suffering from a vibration in the driveline. Practice 2 was topped by Whincup's co-driver Dumbrell, who set a time of 2:06.8947. Walsh, Premat, Canto and Macauley Jones completed the top five. The session was red flagged with seven minutes remaining when Golding ran wide at Turn 6 and made heavy contact with the outside wall. The car suffered significant damage to the front and rear suspension on the left-hand side as well as to the transaxle. Moffat did not take part in Practice 3 as Garry Rogers Motorsport were unable to repair the damage from the crash in time. Like Practice 1, the session was contested mainly by regular drivers, with only six co-drivers completing laps during the session. Whincup set a lap time of 2:05.2946 to be fastest ahead of Coulthard and Mostert.

Two more one-hour sessions were held on Friday. Practice 4 was open only to co-drivers while all drivers were allowed to run in Practice 5. The car of Moffat and Golding returned to the circuit in Practice 4 after being repaired overnight; Golding finished the session in 14th place. Le Brocq set a time of 2:05.9547 to be fastest, with Youlden, Dumbrell, Canto and Premat completing the top five. Ingall clipped the wall at Turn 13, similar to Courtney in Practice 1, but continued without damage and finished the session in 22nd place. While co-drivers were allowed to run in Practice 5, the session was contested exclusively by regular drivers. The final part of the session was used as a simulation for qualifying session to be held later in the day. Whincup returned his car to the top of the order with a time of 2:05.1494, the fastest lap of the weekend to that point. Winterbottom was second fastest ahead of Mostert, McLaughlin and Van Gisbergen. Halfway through the session, Percat's car got loose going through the Esses, causing him to lock a brake going into the Dipper. He hit the inside wall which sent the car into a spin before it came to rest on the exit of the Dipper. Percat escaped without significant damage and was able to take part in the remainder in the session. The sixth and final one-hour practice session was held on Saturday morning. Teams focused on the race set-up of their cars for the majority of the session and completed practice pit stops. Towards the end of the session, a number of the drivers who had qualified for the Top 10 Shootout took the opportunity to do a simulation of their Shootout lap; Mostert set a lap time of 2:05.3352 to be fastest. His co-driver Owen had almost hit the wall earlier in the session when he lost control of the rear of the car going into the Dipper. Winterbottom was second fastest ahead of McLaughlin.

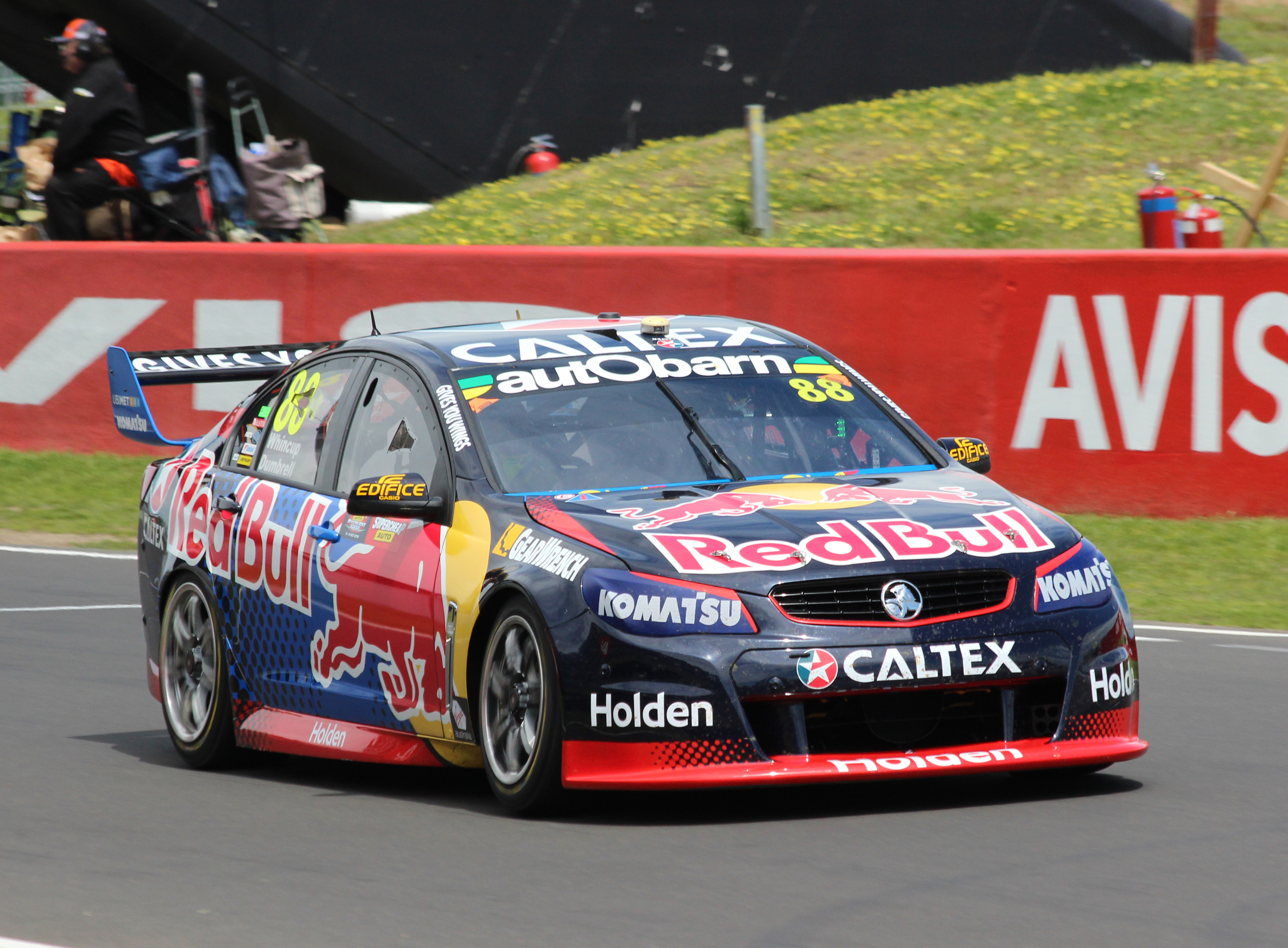
The car of Jamie Whincup and Paul Dumbrell was fastest in four of the six practice sessions.

Practice summary
Session	No.	Driver	Team	Car	Time
Thursday
Practice 1	88	(Australia) Jamie Whincup	Triple Eight Race Engineering	Holden VF Commodore	2:05.9500
Practice 2	88	(Australia) Paul Dumbrell	Triple Eight Race Engineering	Holden VF Commodore	2:06.8947
Practice 3	88	(Australia) Jamie Whincup	Triple Eight Race Engineering	Holden VF Commodore	2:05.2946
Friday
Practice 4	6	(Australia) Jack Le Brocq	Prodrive Racing Australia	Ford FG X Falcon	2:05.9547
Practice 5	88	(Australia) Jamie Whincup	Triple Eight Race Engineering	Holden VF Commodore	2:05.1494
Saturday
Practice 6	55	(Australia) Chaz Mostert	Rod Nash Racing	Ford FG X Falcon	2:05.3352

=== Qualifying – Race 21 ===
Qualifying for Race 20 consisted of two parts: a 40-minute qualifying session and a Top 10 Shootout. The qualifying session was held on Friday afternoon and was contested by regular championship drivers. The fastest ten drivers in the qualifying session progressed to the Top 10 Shootout, held on Saturday afternoon.

==== Qualifying ====
The start of the qualifying session was delayed by ten minutes following a crash in the preceding Supercars Dunlop Series session which left fluid on the circuit. Whincup continued to show strong form, setting an early benchmark of 2:05.5157. His teammate Van Gisbergen set the second fastest time, with Mostert, McLaughlin and Winterbottom completing the top five, before the session was red flagged when Davies went off at the Chase and became stuck in the sand trap. As per the qualifying regulations, Davies had his fastest lap time removed and was not permitted to take part in the rest of the session. The session resumed with 25 minutes remaining and Mostert went to the top of the order with a 2:05.2067. The session was red flagged again with 20 minutes remaining, with de Silvestro getting stuck in the sand trap at the Chase. Like Davies, she had her fastest time removed and was excluded from the rest of the session.

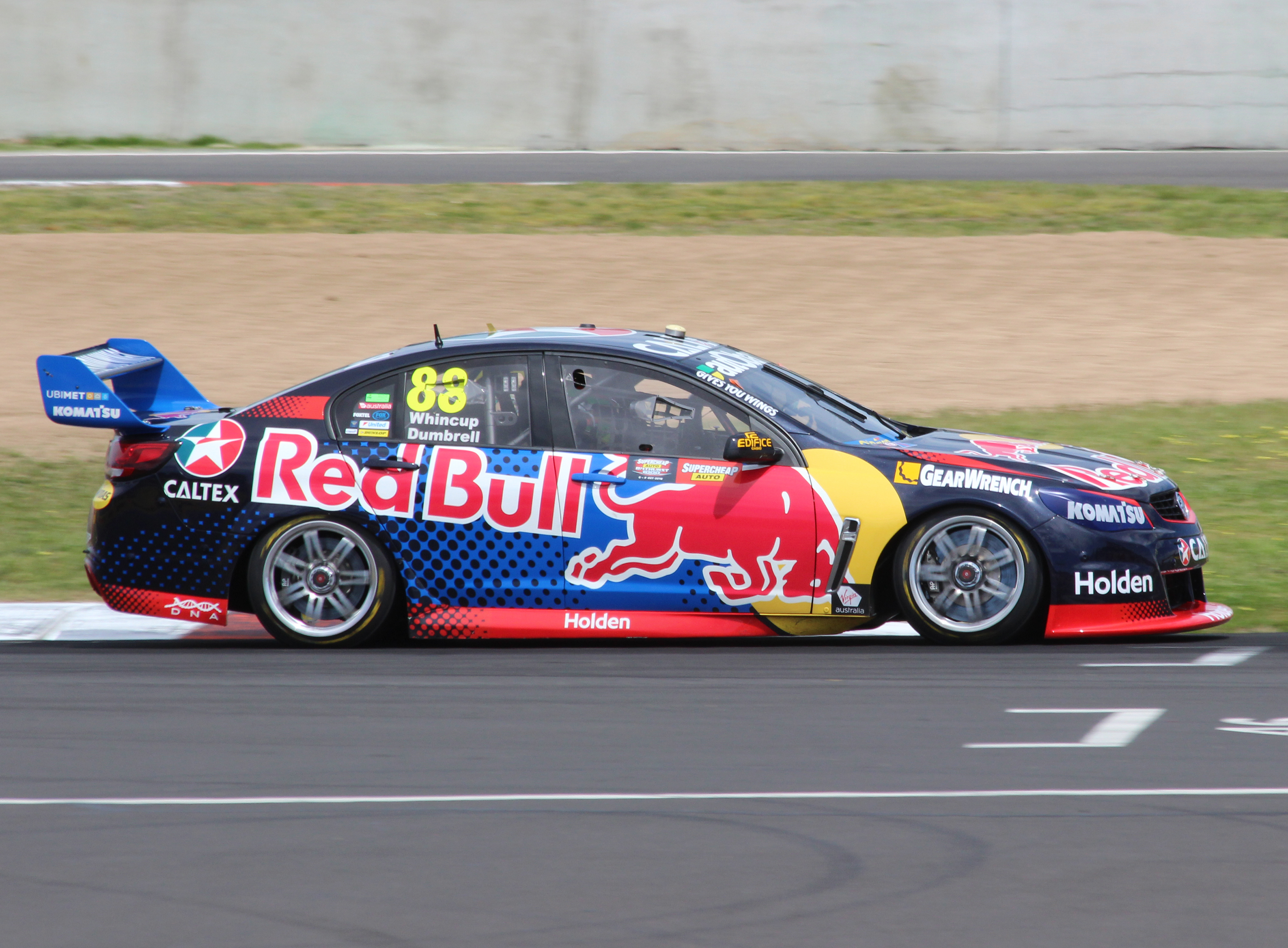
Jamie Whincup took pole position for the race, having been fastest in both qualifying and the Top 10 Shootout.

After the resumption of the session, Mostert remained at the top of the order until Whincup set a time of 2:05.0481 with two minutes remaining, which would prove to be the fastest time of the session. McLaughlin started his final flying lap just before the end of the session and moved up to second, one tenth of a second slower than Whincup. Slade was third fastest despite encountering an electrical problem which left him without key information—such as anti-roll bar positions and brake bias—for much of the session. Mostert, Coulthard, Van Gisbergen, Winterbottom, Pye, Tander and Caruso completed the top ten and progressed through to the Top 10 Shootout along with Whincup, McLaughlin and Slade. Defending race winner Lowndes qualified in 21st position, having struggled with his car for most of practice.

==== Top 10 Shootout ====
The top ten shootout saw each of the ten drivers complete one flying lap each, in reverse order of their qualifying positions. Having qualified in tenth position, Caruso was the first driver to complete a lap, setting a time of 2:05.9167. Both Tander and Pye were unable to beat Caruso's time, with Tander going 0.0019 seconds faster than Pye. Winterbottom ran wide at the Chase on his lap, setting the slowest time of 2:08.2615. Van Gisbergen went faster than Tander but was still over three tenths of a second slower than Caruso. Caruso's time was finally beaten when Coulthard set a time of 2:05.6726; this was immediately eclipsed by Mostert's time, who went fastest despite running wide on the exit of the Chase. Slade slotted in between Coulthard and Caruso before McLaughlin went to the top, 0.0352 seconds faster than Mostert. Whincup was the final driver to complete a lap and set a time of 2:05.4263 to take pole position by less than a tenth of a second over McLaughlin. It was the second time Whincup had scored pole position at Bathurst, though he downplayed its importance, saying: "It’s all good stuff, but it doesn’t mean anything, tomorrow’s the big day. There’s no points for qualifying on pole."

== Controversy ==
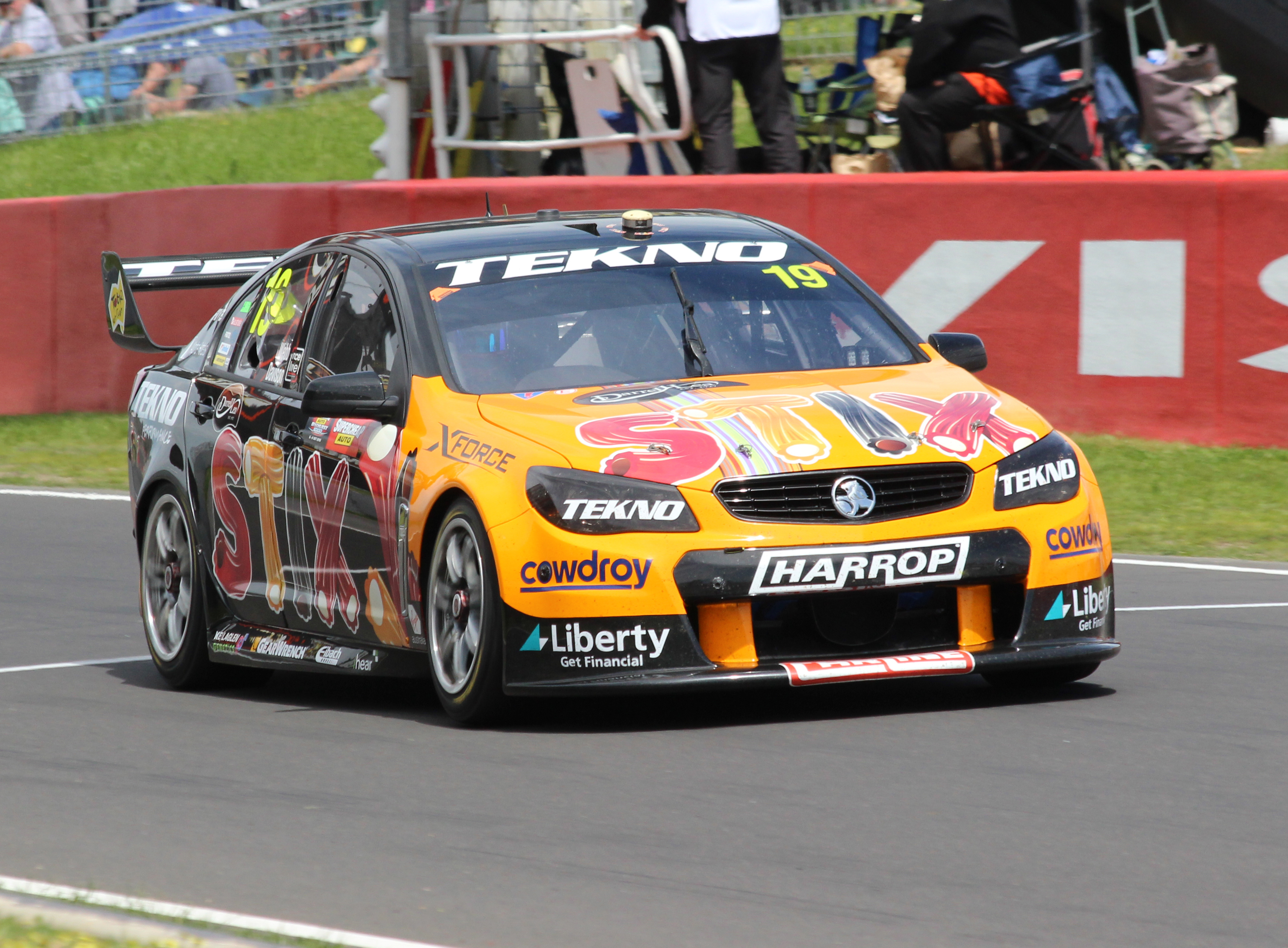
Will Davison and Jonathon Webb won the 2016 Bathurst 1000 after Jamie Whincup caused a late crash in the dramatic race.

Whincup was running second behind McLaughlin in the closing stages of the Bathurst 1000, when he attempted to pass McLaughlin coming into the chase, but the two touched sending the McLaughlin across the grass on the exit of the corner. Attempting to redress the situation, Whincup slowed down to allow McLaughlin to rejoin the track ahead. However, as he slowed down, Tander, who was running directly behind the pair in third place, tried to take advantage and pass both drivers, but as he pulled out to pass Whincup, McLaughlin rejoined the track and ran into the side of the HRT car, knocking both drivers out of contention as Whincup carried on. However, whilst the safety car was out to clean up the incident, Whincup received a 15-second penalty which would be applied after the race. Once the safety car pulled in, Whincup attempted to pull out a 15-second gap over Davison, who was focused on defending the net lead of the race over van Gisbergen. But this plan failed when Todd Kelly spun into the gravel on lap 158 and brought out the safety car, however the race continue to run. Whincup took the win on the road but dropped down to 11th once the penalty was applied, giving the race win to Davison.

"I just went out there and raced hard. I feel sorry for the result, I'm just going up to the Volvo and HRT guys. You don’t want to see any wrecked cars. I'll just go and apologies for the result. I feel the move was on, I was in there. He squeezed me narrow, we had contact. I was happy to redress, but the two cars weren't there to redress."

"We tried hard like we always do. We'll fight back in a couple of weeks time."

Holden Racing Team owner Ryan Walkinshaw was furious at a "greedy" Whincup who says he robbed Holden Racing Team of a potential Bathurst 1000 fairytale ending. Walkinshaw slammed the Red Bull Racing Australia driver for the chaotic crash which put Tander out of the race and left McLaughlan to limp home in 12th. "It's gutting for the boys", Walkinshaw said. "If it hadn't been for Jamie (Whincup) making that move on Scotty (McLaughlin) we probably win that race. It's a difficult thing to take. A win for that car would've been an absolute fairytale and it was a real shame it got spoiled unnecessarily by the actions of Jamie (Whincup)." "Scotty (Scott McLaughlin) came and apologised. He's a good bloke and didn't mean to do what he did. I can see that," "As I've said, I don’t think any of it would have happened if Jamie hadn't slowed done so much. We're just gutted because it would have been the perfect way to end not only our relationship with the Holden Racing Team, winning Bathurst, but also our last race with Garth Tander as well." "It's a shame because you don't want to see races won or lost like that. When you've got three drivers all fighting for the win at a place like Mount Panorama, with 10 laps to go, we want clean racing. That's what we were giving out and what you expect in return."

Australian motor racing legend John Bowe believes Whincup has been "robbed" of a Bathurst 1000 title as the controversy following Sunday's race continues to rage. The Whincup camp has received support from two-time Bathurst winner Bowe, who issued a statement on Facebook backing the appeal, calling Whincup an "extremely fair driver".

=== Triple Eight lodge protest ===
The appeal against the penalty along with a $10,000 fee has been submitted by Red Bull Racing Australia Team Manager Mark Dutton to the CAMS Stewards of the meeting. The crux of Triple Eight's appeal centres on an argument that levying the time penalty is inconsistent with the system of punishment that has been explained to teams this year, which includes three levels of offence and the ability to redress an error by handing back the position taken in the passing move. Triple Eight owner Roland Dane told supercars.com. “We have protested the 15 seconds because the penalty they gave is completely inconsistent with what we have been given as the way the rules will be enforced this year,” Dane said. “It is questionable whether Jamie (Whincup) was guilty of any crime when you actually look at the incident with McLaughlin. The stewards have confirmed that the 15 seconds penalty is nothing to do with the aftermath. That wasn’t Jamie’s fault. It was only to do with the incident with McLaughlin.”

=== The Supercars National Court of Appeal ===
On 18 October, the Supercars National Court of Appeal's dismissal of Whincup's appeal on Tuesday night ensured provisional winner Holden's Will Davison and co-driver Jonathon Webb's grip on the Peter Brock Trophy tightened. However, Whincup's Red Bull Racing Australia have a week to decide whether to take their case to the FIA International Court of Appeal. Triple Eight Race Engineering entry Red Bull Racing Australia appealed the severity of the time penalty but it took just 50 minutes for the three-man Supercars Court of Appeal panel to dismiss it.

== Results ==
=== Race 21 ===
==== Qualifying ====
Pos.	No.	Driver	Team	Car	Time	Gap	Grid
1	88	(Australia) Jamie Whincup	Triple Eight Race Engineering	Holden VF Commodore	2:05.0481		Top 10
2	33	(New Zealand) Scott McLaughlin	Garry Rogers Motorsport	Volvo S60	2:05.1512	+0.1031	Top 10
3	14	(Australia) Tim Slade	Brad Jones Racing	Holden VF Commodore	2:05.1861	+0.1380	Top 10
4	55	(Australia) Chaz Mostert	Rod Nash Racing	Ford FG X Falcon	2:05.2056	+0.1575	Top 10
5	12	(New Zealand) Fabian Coulthard	DJR Team Penske	Ford FG X Falcon	2:05.2284	+0.1803	Top 10
6	97	(New Zealand) Shane van Gisbergen	Triple Eight Race Engineering	Holden VF Commodore	2:05.2350	+0.1869	Top 10
7	1	(Australia) Mark Winterbottom	Prodrive Racing Australia	Ford FG X Falcon	2:05.3394	+0.2913	Top 10
8	17	(Australia) Scott Pye	DJR Team Penske	Ford FG X Falcon	2:05.4626	+0.4145	Top 10
9	2	(Australia) Garth Tander	Holden Racing Team	Holden VF Commodore	2:05.5825	+0.5344	Top 10
10	23	(Australia) Michael Caruso	Nissan Motorsport	Nissan Altima L33	2:05.5907	+0.5426	Top 10
11	8	(Australia) Jason Bright	Brad Jones Racing	Holden VF Commodore	2:05.6666	+0.6185	11
12	111	(New Zealand) Chris Pither	Super Black Racing	Ford FG X Falcon	2:05.6806	+0.6325	12
13	6	(Australia) Cam Waters	Prodrive Racing Australia	Ford FG X Falcon	2:05.7948	+0.7467	13
14	9	(Australia) David Reynolds	Erebus Motorsport	Holden VF Commodore	2:05.8381	+0.7900	14
15	18	(Australia) Lee Holdsworth	Charlie Schwerkolt Racing	Holden VF Commodore	2:05.9417	+0.8936	15
16	22	(Australia) James Courtney	Holden Racing Team	Holden VF Commodore	2:05.9937	+0.9456	16
17	19	(Australia) Will Davison	Tekno Autosports	Holden VF Commodore	2:05.9941	+0.9460	17
18	96	(Australia) Dale Wood	Nissan Motorsport	Nissan Altima L33	2:06.0319	+0.9838	18
19	7	(Australia) Todd Kelly	Nissan Motorsport	Nissan Altima L33	2:06.0573	+1.0092	19
20	15	(Australia) Rick Kelly	Nissan Motorsport	Nissan Altima L33	2:06.1815	+1.1334	20
21	888	(Australia) Craig Lowndes	Triple Eight Race Engineering	Holden VF Commodore	2:06.2289	+1.1808	21
22	222	(Australia) Nick Percat	Lucas Dumbrell Motorsport	Holden VF Commodore	2:06.2708	+1.2227	22
23	34	(Australia) James Moffat	Garry Rogers Motorsport	Volvo S60	2:06.2778	+1.2297	23
24	21	(Australia) Tim Blanchard	Britek Motorsport	Holden VF Commodore	2:06.4516	+1.4035	24
25	3	(New Zealand) Andre Heimgartner	Lucas Dumbrell Motorsport	Holden VF Commodore	2:07.1142	+2.0661	25
26	360	(Switzerland) Simona de Silvestro	Nissan Motorsport	Nissan Altima L33	2:09.6682^{1a}	+4.6201	26
27	4	(Australia) Shae Davies	Erebus Motorsport	Holden VF Commodore	2:19.3845^{1b}	+14.3364	27

Notes

- ^1 — Drivers had their fastest lap time invalidated for causing a red flag.

==== Top 10 Shootout ====
Pos.	No.	Driver	Team	Car	Time	Gap	Grid
1	88	(Australia) Jamie Whincup	Triple Eight Race Engineering	Holden VF Commodore	2:05.4263		1
2	33	(New Zealand) Scott McLaughlin	Garry Rogers Motorsport	Volvo S60	2:05.4915	+0.0652	2
3	55	(Australia) Chaz Mostert	Rod Nash Racing	Ford FG X Falcon	2:05.5267	+0.1005	3
4	12	(New Zealand) Fabian Coulthard	DJR Team Penske	Ford FG X Falcon	2:05.6726	+0.2463	4
5	14	(Australia) Tim Slade	Brad Jones Racing	Holden VF Commodore	2:05.8568	+0.4305	5
6	23	(Australia) Michael Caruso	Nissan Motorsport	Nissan Altima L33	2:05.9167	+0.4904	6
7	97	(New Zealand) Shane van Gisbergen	Triple Eight Race Engineering	Holden VF Commodore	2:06.2550	+0.8287	7
8	2	(Australia) Garth Tander	Holden Racing Team	Holden VF Commodore	2:06.5538	+1.1275	8
9	17	(Australia) Scott Pye	DJR Team Penske	Ford FG X Falcon	2:06.5557	+1.1294	9
10	1	(Australia) Mark Winterbottom	Prodrive Racing Australia	Ford FG X Falcon	2:08.2615	+2.8352	10

=== Race ===
Pos.	No.	Driver	Team	Car	Laps	Time/Retired	Grid	Points
1	19	(Australia) Will Davison (Australia) Jonathon Webb	Tekno Autosports	Holden VF Commodore	161	6:19:25.3237	17	300
2	97	(New Zealand) Shane van Gisbergen (France) Alexandre Prémat	Triple Eight Race Engineering	Holden VF Commodore	161	+0.1434	7	276
3	222	(Australia) Nick Percat (Australia) Cameron McConville	Lucas Dumbrell Motorsport	Holden VF Commodore	161	+2.8554	22	258
4	6	(Australia) Cam Waters (Australia) Jack Le Brocq	Prodrive Racing Australia	Ford FG X Falcon	161	+3.2351	13	240
5	17	(Australia) Scott Pye (Australia) Tony D'Alberto	DJR Team Penske	Ford FG X Falcon	161	+3.8215	9	222
6	12	(New Zealand) Fabian Coulthard (Australia) Luke Youlden	DJR Team Penske	Ford FG X Falcon	161	+4.0336	4	204
7	14	(Australia) Tim Slade (Australia) Ashley Walsh	Brad Jones Racing	Holden VF Commodore	161	+4.1968	5	192
8	23	(Australia) Michael Caruso (Australia) Dean Fiore	Nissan Motorsport	Nissan Altima L33	161	+6.0884	6	180
9	96	(Australia) Dale Wood (Australia) David Russell	Nissan Motorsport	Nissan Altima L33	161	+8.3833	18	168
10	21	(Australia) Tim Blanchard (Australia) Macauley Jones	Britek Motorsport	Holden VF Commodore	161	+8.8587	24	156
11	88	(Australia) Jamie Whincup (Australia) Paul Dumbrell	Triple Eight Race Engineering	Holden VF Commodore	161	+9.7216^{1}	1	144
12	111	(New Zealand) Chris Pither (New Zealand) Richie Stanaway	Super Black Racing	Ford FG X Falcon	161	+16.4443	12	138
13	22	(Australia) James Courtney (Australia) Jack Perkins	Holden Racing Team	Holden VF Commodore	161	+19.2488	16	132
14	360	(Switzerland) Simona de Silvestro (Australia) Renee Gracie	Nissan Motorsport	Nissan Altima L33	159	+2 Laps	26	126
15	33	(New Zealand) Scott McLaughlin (Australia) David Wall	Garry Rogers Motorsport	Volvo S60	159	+2 Laps	2	120
16	888	(Australia) Craig Lowndes (New Zealand) Steven Richards	Triple Eight Race Engineering	Holden VF Commodore	156	+5 Laps	21	114
17	4	(Australia) Shae Davies (New Zealand) Chris van der Drift	Erebus Motorsport	Holden VF Commodore	156	+5 Laps	27	108
18	9	(Australia) David Reynolds (New Zealand) Craig Baird	Erebus Motorsport	Holden VF Commodore	148	+13 Laps	14	102
19	55	(Australia) Chaz Mostert (Australia) Steve Owen	Rod Nash Racing	Ford FG X Falcon	147	+14 Laps	3	96
Ret	7	(Australia) Todd Kelly (Australia) Matt Campbell	Nissan Motorsport	Nissan Altima L33	157	Stuck in sand trap	19	
Ret	15	(Australia) Rick Kelly (Australia) Russell Ingall	Nissan Motorsport	Nissan Altima L33	156	Accident damage	20	
Ret	2	(Australia) Garth Tander (Australia) Warren Luff	Holden Racing Team	Holden VF Commodore	150	Accident damage	8	
Ret	1	(Australia) Mark Winterbottom (Australia) Dean Canto	Prodrive Racing Australia	Ford FG X Falcon	132	Brakes	10	
Ret	3	(New Zealand) Andre Heimgartner (Australia) Aaren Russell	Lucas Dumbrell Motorsport	Holden VF Commodore	114	Transaxle	25	
Ret	34	(Australia) James Moffat (Australia) James Golding	Garry Rogers Motorsport	Volvo S60	108	Engine	23	
Ret	8	(Australia) Jason Bright (Australia) Andrew Jones	Brad Jones Racing	Holden VF Commodore	89	Accident	11	
Ret	18	(Australia) Lee Holdsworth (Australia) Karl Reindler	Charlie Schwerkolt Racing	Holden VF Commodore	2	Engine	15	

^1 – Received a 15-second time penalty for causing a collision.

== Championship standings ==
- After Race 21 of 29. Only the top five positions are included for both sets of standings.

Drivers' Championship standings

	Pos.	Driver	Points
	1	(New Zealand) Shane van Gisbergen	2524
	2	(Australia) Jamie Whincup	2385
	3	(Australia) Craig Lowndes	2205
2	4	(Australia) Will Davison	2112
1	5	(New Zealand) Scott McLaughlin	2084

Teams' Championship standings

	Pos.	Constructor	Points
	1	Triple Eight Race Engineering	4919
	2	Holden Racing Team	3358
2	3	Prodrive Racing Australia	3166
1	4	Garry Rogers Motorsport	3111
2	5	DJR Team Penske	3110

== Broadcast ==
The event telecast was produced by Supercars Media and carried domestically by Fox Sports Australia (via Fox Sports 506), a paid service which covered all sessions including support categories, and Network 10 (via free-to-air channels 10 and 10 Bold), which covered select sessions from midday Friday onwards. The coverage was nominated for a Logie in 2017 for Most Outstanding Sports Coverage.

Fox Sports	Network 10
Host: Jessica Yates, Russell Ingall; Booth: Neil Crompton, Mark Skaife; Pit-lane: Riana Crehan, Greg Murphy, Greg Rust	Presenters: Aaron Noonan, Matthew White; Pundits: Rick Kelly, Mark Larkham; Roving: Scott MacKinnon, Kate Peck
