= 2026 GT World Challenge Australia =

Australian motorsport championship season

The 2026 GT World Challenge Australia Powered by AWS is an Australian motorsport competition for GT3 cars. It is the third season since the SRO Motorsports Group took over sole management of the series. The season started at Phillip Island on 27 March and will finish at the Adelaide Street Circuit on 29 November.

== Calendar ==
The provisional six-round calendar was announced during the 2025 SRO Press conference at the 2025 24 Hours of Spa. Hidden Valley Raceway will make its debut in the series with the rounds at Sandown Raceway and Hampton Downs Motorsport Park dropped from the schedule. The sixth and final round was confirmed on November 11, 2025, and will take place at the Adelaide Street Circuit for the first time since 2023.

Round	Circuit	City / State	Date	Map
1	(Victoria (state)) Phillip Island Grand Prix Circuit	Phillip Island, Victoria	27–29 March	2026 GT World Challenge Australia is located in Australia
2	(South Australia) The Bend Motorsport Park	Tailem Bend, South Australia	8–10 May	2026 GT World Challenge Australia is located in Australia
3	Queensland Raceway	Ipswich, Queensland	12–14 June	2026 GT World Challenge Australia is located in Australia
4	(Northern Territory) Hidden Valley Raceway	Darwin, Northern Territory	24–26 July	2026 GT World Challenge Australia is located in Australia
5	(New South Wales) Sydney Motorsport Park	Eastern Creek, New South Wales	18–20 September	2026 GT World Challenge Australia is located in Australia
6	(South Australia) Adelaide Street Circuit	Adelaide, South Australia	26–29 November	2026 GT World Challenge Australia is located in Australia

== Entry list ==
Team	Car	Engine	No.	Drivers	Class	Rounds
(Australia) Melbourne Performance Centre (Note: Car No. 1 entered as Kelso Electrical, No. 2 as Trading Garage, No. 9 as Hallmarc, and No. 24 as KFC.)	Audi R8 LMS Evo II	Audi DAR 5.2 L V10	1	(Australia) Brad Schumacher	PA	All
(Australia) Melbourne Performance Centre	Audi R8 LMS Evo II	Audi DAR 5.2 L V10	1	(Australia) Broc Feeney	PA	1–5
(Australia) Melbourne Performance Centre	Audi R8 LMS Evo II	Audi DAR 5.2 L V10	1	(Belgium) Frédéric Vervisch	PA	6
(Australia) Melbourne Performance Centre	Audi R8 LMS Evo II	Audi DAR 5.2 L V10	2	(Australia) Valentino Astuti	PA	1–5
(Australia) Melbourne Performance Centre	Audi R8 LMS Evo II	Audi DAR 5.2 L V10	2	(Australia) Darren Currie	PA	1–5
(Australia) Melbourne Performance Centre	Audi R8 LMS Evo II	Audi DAR 5.2 L V10	9	(Australia) Nick McBride	PA	6
(Australia) Melbourne Performance Centre	Audi R8 LMS Evo II	Audi DAR 5.2 L V10	9	(Australia) Marc Cini	PA	6
(Australia) Melbourne Performance Centre	Audi R8 LMS Evo II	Audi DAR 5.2 L V10	24	(Australia) Paul Stokell	T	1–5
(Australia) Melbourne Performance Centre	Audi R8 LMS Evo II	Audi DAR 5.2 L V10	24	(Australia) Matthew Stoupas	T	1–2, 4–5
(Australia) Melbourne Performance Centre	Audi R8 LMS Evo II	Audi DAR 5.2 L V10	24	(Australia) Gary Higgon	T	3
(New Zealand) Earl Bamber Motorsport (Note: Car No. 7 entered as Team NZ EBM, No. 81 as Earl Bamber Motorsport, and No. 92 as The Bend EBM.)	Mercedes-AMG GT3 Evo	Mercedes-AMG M159 6.2 L V8	7	(New Zealand) Chris van der Drift	PA	6
(New Zealand) Earl Bamber Motorsport	Mercedes-AMG GT3 Evo	Mercedes-AMG M159 6.2 L V8	7	(New Zealand) Graeme Dowsett	PA	6
(New Zealand) Earl Bamber Motorsport	Porsche 911 GT3 R (991.2)	Porsche M97/80 4.0 L Flat-6	81	(Australia) Andrew Georgiadis	PA	5
(New Zealand) Earl Bamber Motorsport	Porsche 911 GT3 R (991.2)	Porsche M97/80 4.0 L Flat-6	81	(Australia) Tom McLennan	PA	5
(New Zealand) Earl Bamber Motorsport	Porsche 911 GT3 R (992.2)	Porsche M97/80 4.2 L Flat-6	92	(Germany) Laurin Heinrich	PA	6
(New Zealand) Earl Bamber Motorsport	Porsche 911 GT3 R (992.2)	Porsche M97/80 4.2 L Flat-6	92	(Australia) Yasser Shahin	PA	6
(Australia) Volante Rosso Motorsport	Aston Martin Vantage AMR GT3	Aston Martin AMR16A 4.0 L Turbo V8	14	(Australia) Alex Gardner	T	1–2
(Australia) Volante Rosso Motorsport	Aston Martin Vantage AMR GT3	Aston Martin AMR16A 4.0 L Turbo V8	14	(Australia) Lee Stibbs	T	1
(Australia) Volante Rosso Motorsport	Aston Martin Vantage AMR GT3	Aston Martin AMR16A 4.0 L Turbo V8	14	(Australia) Ben Porter	T	2
(Australia) Volante Rosso Motorsport	Aston Martin Vantage AMR GT3	Aston Martin AMR16A 4.0 L Turbo V8	14	(Australia) Cameron Rees	T	3
(Australia) Volante Rosso Motorsport	McLaren 720S GT3 Evo	McLaren M840T 4.0 L Turbo V8	15	(Australia) Geoff Emery	PA	1–3
(Australia) Volante Rosso Motorsport	McLaren 720S GT3 Evo	McLaren M840T 4.0 L Turbo V8	15	(Australia) Josh Hunt	PA	1–3
(Australia) Zagame Autosport	Ferrari 296 GT3	Ferrari F163CE 3.0 L Turbo V6	23	(Australia) Josh Buchan	PA	1–5
(Australia) Zagame Autosport	Ferrari 296 GT3	Ferrari F163CE 3.0 L Turbo V6	23	(Australia) Cameron Campbell	PA	1–5
(Australia) ARGT	Ferrari 296 GT3	Ferrari F163CE 3.0 L Turbo V6	26	(New Zealand) Jaxon Evans	PA	1–5
(Australia) ARGT	Ferrari 296 GT3	Ferrari F163CE 3.0 L Turbo V6	26	(Australia) Elliott Schutte	PA	1–5
(Australia) ARGT	Ferrari 296 GT3	Ferrari F163CE 3.0 L Turbo V6	77	(Australia) Steve Wyatt	PA	1
(Australia) ARGT	Ferrari 296 GT3	Ferrari F163CE 3.0 L Turbo V6	77	(Australia) Jordan Love	PA	1
(Australia) Tigani Motorsport (Note: Car No. 44 entered as Geyer Velmont Racing, No. 47 as Supabarn Supermarkets, No. 56 as Kollosche AMG, No. 66 as Move My Wheels, and No. 71 as AED Consulting.)	Mercedes-AMG GT3 Evo	Mercedes-AMG M159 6.2 L V8	44	(New Zealand) Brendon Leitch	PA	1–5
(Australia) Tigani Motorsport	Mercedes-AMG GT3 Evo	Mercedes-AMG M159 6.2 L V8	44	(Australia) Sergio Pires	PA	1–5
(Australia) Tigani Motorsport	Mercedes-AMG GT3 Evo	Mercedes-AMG M159 6.2 L V8	47	(Australia) James Koundouris	Am	1, 6
(Australia) Tigani Motorsport	Mercedes-AMG GT3 Evo	Mercedes-AMG M159 6.2 L V8	47	(Australia) Theo Koundouris	Am	1, 6
(Australia) Tigani Motorsport	Mercedes-AMG GT3 Evo	Mercedes-AMG M159 6.2 L V8	56	(Australia) Oscar Targett	PA	1–5
(Australia) Tigani Motorsport	Mercedes-AMG GT3 Evo	Mercedes-AMG M159 6.2 L V8	56	(Australia) Shane Smollen	PA	1–2, 4–5
(Australia) Tigani Motorsport	Mercedes-AMG GT3 Evo	Mercedes-AMG M159 6.2 L V8	56	(Australia) Justin Tigani	PA	3
(Australia) Tigani Motorsport	Mercedes-AMG GT3 Evo	Mercedes-AMG M159 6.2 L V8	66	(Australia) Paul Lucchitti	PA	All
(Australia) Tigani Motorsport	Mercedes-AMG GT3 Evo	Mercedes-AMG M159 6.2 L V8	66	(Australia) Jayden Ojeda	PA	1–5
(Australia) Tigani Motorsport	Mercedes-AMG GT3 Evo	Mercedes-AMG M159 6.2 L V8	66	(Australia) Scott Andrews	PA	6
(Australia) Tigani Motorsport	Porsche 911 GT3 R (991)	Porsche M97/80 4.0 L Flat 6	71	(Australia) Nathan Halstead	T	1–5
(Australia) Tigani Motorsport	Porsche 911 GT3 R (991)	Porsche M97/80 4.0 L Flat 6	71	(Australia) Luke Youlden	T	1–5
GWR Australia/RAM Motorsport	Mercedes-AMG GT3 Evo	Mercedes-AMG M159 6.2 L V8	45	(Australia) Brett Hobson	Am	5
GWR Australia/RAM Motorsport	Mercedes-AMG GT3 Evo	Mercedes-AMG M159 6.2 L V8	45	(Australia) Michael Sheargold	Am	5
(Australia) Wallis Racing	Porsche 911 GT3 R (991.2)	Porsche M97/80 4.0 L Flat-6	62	(Australia) Jack Wallis	T	6
(Australia) Wallis Racing	Porsche 911 GT3 R (991.2)	Porsche M97/80 4.0 L Flat-6	62	(Australia) Adam Wallis	T	6
(Australia) Team BRM (Note: Car No. 88 entered as Wolfbrook Team BRM, No. 268 as Castrol Team BRM for rounds 1-2 only, and No. 666 as Team BRM.)	Audi R8 LMS Evo II	Audi DAR 5.2 L V10	88	(New Zealand) Steve Brooks	PA	1–5
(Australia) Team BRM	Audi R8 LMS Evo II	Audi DAR 5.2 L V10	88	(New Zealand) Ryan Wood	PA	1–5
(Australia) Team BRM	Audi R8 LMS Evo II	Audi DAR 5.2 L V10	268	(Australia) Mark Rosser	PA	1–5
(Australia) Team BRM	Audi R8 LMS Evo II	Audi DAR 5.2 L V10	268	(Australia) Thomas Randle	PA	1–2
(Australia) Team BRM	Audi R8 LMS Evo II	Audi DAR 5.2 L V10	268	(Australia) Alex Peroni	PA	3–5
(Australia) Team BRM	Audi R8 LMS Evo II	Audi DAR 5.2 L V10	666	(Australia) JP Drake	PA	2, 4
(Australia) Team BRM	Audi R8 LMS Evo II	Audi DAR 5.2 L V10	666	(Australia) Garnet Patterson	PA	2, 4
(Australia) Wall Racing	Lamborghini Huracán GT3 Evo 2	Lamborghini DGF 5.2 L V10	93	(Australia) Tony D'Alberto	PA	1–3, 5
(Australia) Wall Racing	Lamborghini Huracán GT3 Evo 2	Lamborghini DGF 5.2 L V10	93	(Australia) Adrian Deitz	PA	1–3, 5
(Australia) OnlyFans Racing	Ferrari 296 GT3	Ferrari F163CE 3.0 L Turbo V6	181	(Australia) Will Davison	PA	1–5
(Australia) OnlyFans Racing	Ferrari 296 GT3	Ferrari F163CE 3.0 L Turbo V6	181	(Australia) Renee Gracie	PA	1–5

Icon	Class
PA	Pro-Am Cup
Am	Am Cup
T	Trophy Cup
	GT Academy Entrant

== Race results ==
Bold indicates the overall winner.

Round		Circuit	Pole Position	Pro-Am Winners	Am Winners	Trophy Winners
1	R1	(Victoria (state)) Phillip Island	(Australia) No. 1 Team MPC	**(Australia) No. 1 Team MPC**	No starters	(Australia) No. 71 Tigani Motorsport
1	R1	(Victoria (state)) Phillip Island	(Australia) Broc Feeney (Australia) Brad Schumacher	**(Australia) Broc Feeney** **(Australia) Brad Schumacher**	No starters	(Australia) Nathan Halstead (Australia) Luke Youlden
1	R2	(Victoria (state)) Phillip Island	(Australia) No. 66 Tigani Motorsport	**(Australia) No. 66 Tigani Motorsport**	No starters	(Australia) No. 14 Volante Rosso Motorsport
1	R2	(Victoria (state)) Phillip Island	(Australia) Paul Lucchitti (Australia) Jayden Ojeda	**(Australia) Paul Lucchitti** **(Australia) Jayden Ojeda**	No starters	(Australia) Alex Gardner (Australia) Lee Stibbs
2	R1	(South Australia) The Bend	(Australia) No. 44 Tigani Motorsport	**(Australia) No. 44 Tigani Motorsport**	No Entries	(Australia) No. 24 Melbourne Performance Centre
2	R1	(South Australia) The Bend	(Australia) Sergio Pires (Australia) Brendon Leitch	**(Australia) Sergio Pires** **(Australia) Brendon Leitch**	No Entries	(Australia) Paul Stokell (Australia) Matt Stoupas
2	R2	(South Australia) The Bend	(Australia) No. 66 Tigani Motorsport	**(Australia) No. 66 Tigani Motorsport**	No Entries	(Australia) No. 24 Melbourne Performance Centre
2	R2	(South Australia) The Bend	(Australia) Paul Lucchitti (Australia) Jayden Ojeda	**(Australia) Paul Lucchitti** **(Australia) Jayden Ojeda**	No Entries	(Australia) Paul Stokell (Australia) Matt Stoupas
3	R1	Queensland	(Australia) No. 56 Tigani Motorsport	**(Australia) No. 181 OnlyFans Racing**	No Entries	(Australia) No. 71 Tigani Motorsport
3	R1	Queensland	(Australia) Oscar Targett (Australia) Justin Tigani	**(Australia) Will Davison** **(Australia) Renee Gracie**	No Entries	(Australia) Nathan Halstead (Australia) Luke Youlden
3	R2	Queensland	(Australia) No. 56 Tigani Motorsport	**(Australia) No. 44 Tigani Motorsport**	No Entries	(Australia) No. 71 Tigani Motorsport
3	R2	Queensland	(Australia) Oscar Targett (Australia) Justin Tigani	**(Australia) Sergio Pires** **(Australia) Brendon Leitch**	No Entries	(Australia) Nathan Halstead (Australia) Luke Youlden
4	R1	(Northern Territory) Hidden Valley	(Australia) No. 268 Team BRM (Note: Brad Schumacher was quickest in Qualifying 2, which decided the grid for Race 1, but received a three-place grid penalty for impeding, promoting Mark Rosser to pole position. Broc Feeney and Schumacher did keep the bonus point for pole position.)	**(Australia) No. 268 Team BRM**	No Entries	(Australia) No. 24 Melbourne Performance Centre
4	R1	(Northern Territory) Hidden Valley	(Australia) Alex Peroni (Australia) Mark Rosser	**(Australia) Alex Peroni** **(Australia) Mark Rosser**	No Entries	(Australia) Paul Stokell (Australia) Matt Stoupas
4	R2	(Northern Territory) Hidden Valley	(Australia) No. 23 Zagame Autosport	**(Australia) No. 1 Team MPC**	No Entries	(Australia) No. 71 Tigani Motorsport
4	R2	(Northern Territory) Hidden Valley	(Australia) Josh Buchan (Australia) Cameron Campbell	**(Australia) Broc Feeney** **(Australia) Brad Schumacher**	No Entries	(Australia) Nathan Halstead (Australia) Luke Youlden
5	R1	(New South Wales) Sydney	(Australia) No. 56 Tigani Motorsport	**(Australia) No. 56 Tigani Motorsport**	No. 45 GWR Australia/RAM Motorsport	(Australia) No. 24 Melbourne Performance Centre
5	R1	(New South Wales) Sydney	(Australia) Shane Smollen (Australia) Oscar Targett	**(Australia) Shane Smollen** **(Australia) Oscar Targett**	(Australia) Brett Hobson (Australia) Michael Sheargold	(Australia) Paul Stokell (Australia) Matt Stoupas
5	R2	(New South Wales) Sydney	(Australia) No. 268 Team BRM	**(Australia) No. 1 Team MPC**	No. 45 GWR Australia/RAM Motorsport	(Australia) No. 24 Melbourne Performance Centre
5	R2	(New South Wales) Sydney	(Australia) Alex Peroni (Australia) Mark Rosser	**(Australia) Broc Feeney** **(Australia) Brad Schumacher**	(Australia) Brett Hobson (Australia) Michael Sheargold	(Australia) Paul Stokell (Australia) Matt Stoupas
6	R1	(South Australia) Adelaide				
6	R2	(South Australia) Adelaide				

== Championship standings ==
Scoring system

Position	**1st**	**2nd**	**3rd**	**4th**	**5th**	**6th**	**7th**	**8th**	**9th**	**10th**	**Pole**
Points	25	18	15	12	10	8	6	4	2	1	1

=== Drivers' championship ===
==== Pro-Am Cup ====
Pos	Driver	Team	PHI (Victoria (state))		BEN (South Australia)		QLD (Queensland)		HID (Northern Territory)		SYD (New South Wales)		ADE (South Australia)	Points
1	(Australia) Brad Schumacher	(Australia) Melbourne Performance Centre	**1**	8	4	2	4	10	4	1	5	1		146
1	(Australia) Broc Feeney	(Australia) Melbourne Performance Centre	**1**	8	4	2	4	10	4	1	5	1		146
2	(Australia) Mark Rosser	(Australia) Team BRM	3	9	2	3	5	5	**1**	7	2	**4**		132
3	(New Zealand) Brendon Leitch (Australia) Sergio Pires	(Australia) Tigani Motorsport	4	10	**1**	7	3	1	7	5	Ret	2		119
4	(Australia) Paul Lucchitti	(Australia) Tigani Motorsport	Ret	**1**	7	**1**	7	4	2	11	7	9		106
4	(Australia) Jayden Ojeda	(Australia) Tigani Motorsport	Ret	**1**	7	**1**	7	4	2	11	7	9		106
5	(New Zealand) Jaxon Evans (Australia) Elliott Schutte	(Australia) ARGT	5	2	3	5	8	3	Ret	6	4	6		100
6	(New Zealand) Steve Brooks	(Australia) Team BRM	6	3	6	4	11	2	10	2	3	Ret		95
6	(New Zealand) Ryan Wood	(Australia) Team BRM	6	3	6	4	11	2	10	2	3	Ret		95
7	(Australia) Oscar Targett	(Australia) Tigani Motorsport	2	11	9	6	**2**	**6**	8	10	**1**	8		93
8	(Australia) Alex Peroni	(Australia) Team BRM					5	5	**1**	7	2	**4**		82
9	(Australia) Will Davison (Australia) Renee Gracie	(Australia) OnlyFans Racing	7	Ret	5	12	1	8	3	8	8	5		80
10	(Australia) Shane Smollen	(Australia) Tigani Motorsport	2	11	9	6			8	10	**1**	8		65
11	(Australia) Valentino Astuti (Australia) Darren Currie	(Australia) Melbourne Performance Centre	8	4	11	8	10	7	9	4	10	3		58
12	(Australia) Josh Buchan (Australia) Cameron Campbell	(Australia) Zagame Autosport	10	5	10	11	6	11	5	**3**	9	10		52
13	(Australia) Thomas Randle	(Australia) Team BRM	3	9	2	3								50
14	(Australia) Justin Tigani	(Australia) Tigani Motorsport					**2**	**6**						28
15	(Australia) Tony D'Alberto (Australia) Adrian Deitz	(Australia) Wall Racing	9	7	12	9	9	9			11	11		16
16	(Australia) Garnet Patterson (Australia) JP Drake	(Australia) Team BRM			8	13			6	9				14
17	(Australia) Geoff Emery (Australia) Josh Hunt	(Australia) Volante Rosso Motorsport	11	6	13	10	WD	WD						9
—	(Australia) Jordan Love (Australia) Steve Wyatt	(Australia) ARGT	WD	WD										0
Entries ineligible to score points
—	(Australia) Tom McLennan (Australia) Andrew Georgiadis	(New Zealand) Earl Bamber Motorsport									6	7		0
—	(Australia) Scott Andrews	(Australia) Tigani Motorsport												0
—	(Australia) Nick McBride (Australia) Marc Cini	(Australia) Melbourne Performance Centre												0
—	(Germany) Laurin Heinrich (Australia) Yasser Shahin	(New Zealand) Earl Bamber Motorsport												0
—	(Belgium) Frédéric Vervisch	(Australia) Melbourne Performance Centre												0
—	(New Zealand) Chris van der Drift (New Zealand) Graeme Dowsett	(New Zealand) Earl Bamber Motorsport												0
Pos	Driver	Team	PHI (Victoria (state))		BEN (South Australia)		QLD (Queensland)		HID (Northern Territory)		SYD (New South Wales)		ADE (South Australia)	Points

Key
Colour	Result
Gold	Race winner
Silver	2nd place
Bronze	3rd place
Green	Points finish
Blue	Non-points finish
Blue	Non-classified finish (NC)
Purple	Did not finish (Ret)
Black	Disqualified (DSQ)
Black	Excluded (EX)
White	Did not start (DNS)
White	Race cancelled (C)
White	Withdrew (WD)
Blank	Did not participate

**Bold** – Pole
Italics – Fastest lap

==== Am Cup ====
Pos	Driver	Team	PHI (Victoria (state))		BEN (South Australia)	QLD (Queensland)	HID (Northern Territory)	SYD (New South Wales)		ADE (South Australia)	Points
—	(Australia) James Koundouris (Australia) Theo Koundouris	(Australia) Tigani Motorsport	WD	WD							0
Entries ineligible to score points
—	(Australia) Brett Hobson (Australia) Michael Sheargold	GWR Australia/RAM Motorsport						**1**	**1**		0
Pos	Driver	Team	PHI (Victoria (state))		BEN (South Australia)	QLD (Queensland)	HID (Northern Territory)	SYD (New South Wales)		ADE (South Australia)	Points

==== Trophy Cup ====
Pos	Driver	Team	PHI (Victoria (state))		BEN (South Australia)		QLD (Queensland)		HID (Northern Territory)		SYD (New South Wales)		ADE (South Australia)	Points
1	(Australia) Paul Stokell	(Australia) Melbourne Performance Centre	3	**2**	**1**	1	2	2	**1**	2	**1**	1		216
2	(Australia) Nathan Halstead (Australia) Luke Youlden	(Australia) Tigani Motorsport	1	Ret	2	**3**	1	**1**	2	**1**	2	**2**		191
3	(Australia) Matthew Stoupas	(Australia) Melbourne Performance Centre	3	**2**	**1**	1			**1**	2	**1**	1		180
4	(Australia) Alex Gardner	(Australia) Volante Rosso Motorsport	**2**	1	3	2								77
5	(Australia) Lee Stibbs	(Australia) Volante Rosso Motorsport	**2**	1										44
6	(Australia) Gary Higgon	(Australia) Melbourne Performance Centre					2	2						36
7	(Australia) Ben Porter	(Australia) Volante Rosso Motorsport			3	2								33
8	(Australia) Cameron Rees	(Australia) Volante Rosso Motorsport					**3**	3						31
Entries ineligible to score points
—	(Australia) Jack Wallis (Australia) Adam Wallis	(Australia) Wallis Motorsport												0
Pos	Driver	Team	PHI (Victoria (state))		BEN (South Australia)		QLD (Queensland)		HID (Northern Territory)		SYD (New South Wales)		ADE (South Australia)	Points

==== SRO GT Academy ====
Points are not awarded from race results, and instead are based largely on the basis of single driver performance; average pace and fastest laps. The winner of the class will compete in 2027 Spa 24 Hours.

Pos	Driver	Team	Points
1	(Australia) Oscar Targett	(Australia) Tigani Motorsport	345
2	(Australia) Valentino Astuti	(Australia) Melbourne Performance Centre	285
3	(Australia) Alex Gardner	(Australia) Volante Rosso Motorsport	84

=== Teams' championship ===
Only Pro-Am class cars are eligible to score points towards the teams championship

Pos	Team	PHI (Victoria (state))		BEN (South Australia)		QLD (Queensland)		HID (Northern Territory)		SYD (New South Wales)		ADE (South Australia)	Points
1	(Australia) Tigani Motorsport	2	**1**	**1**	**1**	**2**	**1**	2	4	**1**	2		215
2	(Australia) Melbourne Performance Centre	**1**	4	4	2	3	4	4	1	4	1		170
3	(Australia) Team BRM	3	3	2	3	4	2	**1**	2	2	**3**		170
4	(Australia) ARGT	4	2	3	4	6	3	Ret	5	3	5		115
5	(Australia) OnlyFans Racing	5	Ret	5	8	1	5	3	6	6	4		104
6	(Australia) Zagame Motorsport	8	5	6	7	5	8	5	**3**	7	7		84
7	(Australia) Wall Racing	7	7	7	5	7	6			8	8		54
8	(Australia) Volante Rosso Motorsport	6	6	8	6	8	7						38
Entries ineligible to score points
—	(New Zealand) Earl Bamber Motorsport									5	6		0
Pos	Team	PHI (Victoria (state))		BEN (South Australia)		QLD (Queensland)		HID (Northern Territory)		SYD (New South Wales)		ADE (South Australia)	Points

== See also ==
- 2026 British GT Championship
- 2026 GT World Challenge Europe
- 2026 GT World Challenge Europe Endurance Cup
- 2026 GT World Challenge Europe Sprint Cup
- 2026 GT World Challenge Asia
- 2026 GT World Challenge America
- 2026 Intercontinental GT Challenge
- 2026 Bathurst 12 Hour
