= 2023 GT World Challenge Australia =

Motor Racing competition season

The 2023 Fanatec GT World Challenge Australia Powered by AWS was an Australian motor sport competition for GT cars. The series incorporated the "Motorsport Australia GT Championship", the "GT3 Trophy Series", the "GT4 Cup" and the "Invitational Cup". The 2023 Championship was the 27th running of an Australian GT Championship. This was the third season of the championship being jointly managed by Australian Racing Group (ARG) and SRO Motorsports Group.

== Calendar ==
The six-race calendar was released on 16 January 2023 with all rounds taking place in Australia.

Rd	Circuit	City / State	Date	Map
1	(New South Wales) Mount Panorama Circuit	Bathurst, New South Wales	7–9 April	2023 GT World Challenge Australia is located in Australia
2	(Western Australia) Wanneroo Raceway	Perth, Western Australia	28–30 April	2023 GT World Challenge Australia is located in Australia
3	(Victoria (state)) Phillip Island Grand Prix Circuit	Phillip Island, Victoria	12–14 May	2023 GT World Challenge Australia is located in Australia
4	(New South Wales) Sydney Motorsport Park	Eastern Creek, New South Wales	28–30 July	2023 GT World Challenge Australia is located in Australia
5	Queensland Raceway	Ipswich, Queensland	11–13 August	2023 GT World Challenge Australia is located in Australia
6	(South Australia) Adelaide Street Circuit	Adelaide, South Australia	23–25 November	2023 GT World Challenge Australia is located in Australia

== Entry list ==
Team	Car	Engine	No.	Drivers	Class	Rounds
GT3
(Australia) EMA Motorsport	Porsche 911 GT3 R	Porsche 4.0 L Flat-6	1	(Australia) Yasser Shahin	PA	All
(Australia) EMA Motorsport	Porsche 911 GT3 R	Porsche 4.0 L Flat-6	1	(Australia) Garnet Patterson	PA	1–5
(Australia) EMA Motorsport	Porsche 911 GT3 R	Porsche 4.0 L Flat-6	1	(Australia) Matt Campbell	PA	6
(Australia) Grove Racing	Porsche 911 GT3 R	Porsche 4.0 L Flat-6	4	(Australia) Brenton Grove	PA	3
(Australia) Grove Racing	Porsche 911 GT3 R	Porsche 4.0 L Flat-6	4	(Australia) Stephen Grove	PA	3
(Australia) Wall Racing	Lamborghini Huracán GT3 Evo	Lamborghini 5.2 L V10	6	(Australia) Adrian Deitz	PA	3
(Australia) Wall Racing	Lamborghini Huracán GT3 Evo	Lamborghini 5.2 L V10	6	(Australia) David Wall	PA	3
(Australia) Melbourne Performance Centre (Note: Car No. 8 entered as Launch Racing, No. 9 as Hallmarc, No. 10 as Myland, No. 22 as Melbourne Performance Centre, No. 23 as KFC Racing, No. 65 as Shannons Insurance Racing, No. 75 as Jamec Racing, and No. 181 as OnlyFans.)	Audi R8 LMS Evo II	Audi 5.2 L V10	8	(Australia) Michael Kokkinos	Am	1–3
(Australia) Melbourne Performance Centre	Audi R8 LMS Evo II	Audi 5.2 L V10	9	(Australia) Marc Cini	Am	6
(Australia) Melbourne Performance Centre	Audi R8 LMS Evo II	Audi 5.2 L V10	10	(New Zealand) Andrew Fawcet	PA	3
(Australia) Melbourne Performance Centre	Audi R8 LMS Evo II	Audi 5.2 L V10	10	(Australia) Dylan O'Keeffe	PA	3
(Australia) Melbourne Performance Centre	Audi R8 LMS Evo II	Audi 5.2 L V10	22	(Australia) Ash Samadi	Am	1–5
(Australia) Melbourne Performance Centre	Audi R8 LMS Evo II	Audi 5.2 L V10	23	(Australia) Paul Stokell	Am	All
(Australia) Melbourne Performance Centre	Audi R8 LMS Evo II	Audi 5.2 L V10	23	(Australia) Matt Stoupas	Am	All
(Australia) Melbourne Performance Centre	Audi R8 LMS Evo II	Audi 5.2 L V10	65	(Australia) Liam Talbot	PA	All
(Australia) Melbourne Performance Centre	Audi R8 LMS Evo II	Audi 5.2 L V10	65	(Austria) Max Hofer	PA	1–2
(Australia) Melbourne Performance Centre	Audi R8 LMS Evo II	Audi 5.2 L V10	65	(Australia) Fraser Ross	PA	3–4
(Australia) Melbourne Performance Centre	Audi R8 LMS Evo II	Audi 5.2 L V10	65	(Australia) Garth Tander	PA	5
(Australia) Melbourne Performance Centre	Audi R8 LMS Evo II	Audi 5.2 L V10	65	(Germany) Christopher Mies	PA	6
(Australia) Melbourne Performance Centre	Audi R8 LMS Evo II	Audi 5.2 L V10	75	(Australia) Geoff Emery	PA	All
(Australia) Melbourne Performance Centre	Audi R8 LMS Evo II	Audi 5.2 L V10	75	(Germany) Christer Jöns	PA	1
(Australia) Melbourne Performance Centre	Audi R8 LMS Evo II	Audi 5.2 L V10	75	(Germany) Christopher Mies	PA	2
(Australia) Melbourne Performance Centre	Audi R8 LMS Evo II	Audi 5.2 L V10	75	(Austria) Max Hofer	PA	3–6
(Australia) Melbourne Performance Centre	Audi R8 LMS Ultra	Audi 5.2 L V10	181	(Australia) Renee Gracie	T	2–5
(Australia) Melbourne Performance Centre	Audi R8 LMS Evo II	Audi 5.2 L V10	181	(Australia) Renee Gracie	Am	6
(Australia) Dutton Garage	Audi R8 LMS Evo II	Audi 5.2 L V10	18	(Australia) George Nakas	Am	3
(Australia) Dutton Garage	Audi R8 LMS Evo II	Audi 5.2 L V10	18	(Australia) Ben Stack	Am	3
(Australia) Ashley Seward Motorsport	Mercedes-AMG GT3 Evo	Mercedes-AMG M159 6.2 L V8	24	(Australia) Tony Bates	PA	2
(Australia) Ashley Seward Motorsport	Mercedes-AMG GT3 Evo	Mercedes-AMG M159 6.2 L V8	24	(Australia) Jordan Love	PA	2
(Australia) Harrolds Volante Rosso	Mercedes-AMG GT3 Evo	Mercedes-AMG M159 6.2 L V8	34	(Australia) Chris Batzios	PA	6
(Australia) Harrolds Volante Rosso	Mercedes-AMG GT3 Evo	Mercedes-AMG M159 6.2 L V8	34	(Australia) Jayden Ojeda	PA	6
(Australia) Harrolds Volante Rosso	Mercedes-AMG GT3 Evo	Mercedes-AMG M159 6.2 L V8	101	(Australia) Jayden Ojeda	PA	2–5
(Australia) Harrolds Volante Rosso	Mercedes-AMG GT3 Evo	Mercedes-AMG M159 6.2 L V8	101	(Australia) Ross Poulakis	PA	1–5
(Australia) Harrolds Volante Rosso	Mercedes-AMG GT3 Evo	Mercedes-AMG M159 6.2 L V8	101	(Australia) Sam Brabham	PA	1
(Australia) Harrolds Volante Rosso	Mercedes-AMG GT3 Evo	Mercedes-AMG M159 6.2 L V8	102	(Australia) Chris Batzios	PA	3, 5
(Australia) Harrolds Volante Rosso	Mercedes-AMG GT3 Evo	Mercedes-AMG M159 6.2 L V8	102	(Australia) Sam Brabham	PA	3
(Australia) Harrolds Volante Rosso	Mercedes-AMG GT3 Evo	Mercedes-AMG M159 6.2 L V8	102	(Australia) Josh Hunt	PA	5
(Australia) Tigani Motorsport (Note: Car No. 44 entered as Valmont Racing, No. 47 as Supabarn Motorsport, and No. 66 as Tigani Motorsport.)	Audi R8 LMS Evo II	Audi 5.2 L V10	44	(Australia) Sergio Pires	Am	1, 3–5
(Australia) Tigani Motorsport	Audi R8 LMS Evo II	Audi 5.2 L V10	44	(Australia) Marcel Zalloua	Am	1, 3–5
(Australia) Tigani Motorsport	Mercedes-AMG GT3 Evo	Mercedes-AMG M159 6.2 L V8	47	(Australia) Theo Koundouris	Am	4, 6
(Australia) Tigani Motorsport	Mercedes-AMG GT3 Evo	Mercedes-AMG M159 6.2 L V8	47	(Australia) James Koundouris	Am	6
(Australia) Tigani Motorsport	Audi R8 LMS Ultra	Audi 5.2 L V10	66	(Australia) Paul Luchitti	T	3–6
GWR Australia/RAM Motorsport	Mercedes-AMG GT3 Evo	Mercedes-AMG M159 6.2 L V8	45	(Australia) Michael Sheargold	Am	All
GWR Australia/RAM Motorsport	Mercedes-AMG GT3 Evo	Mercedes-AMG M159 6.2 L V8	45	(Australia) Garth Walden	Am	All
GWR Australia/RAM Motorsport	Mercedes-AMG GT3 Evo	Mercedes-AMG M159 6.2 L V8	96	(Australia) Michael Bailey	PA	All
GWR Australia/RAM Motorsport	Mercedes-AMG GT3 Evo	Mercedes-AMG M159 6.2 L V8	96	(Australia) Brett Hobson	PA	All
(Australia) M Motorsport	Mercedes-AMG GT3 Evo	Mercedes-AMG M159 6.2 L V8	48	(Australia) Justin McMillan	PA 2-4; Am 1	1–4
(Australia) M Motorsport	Mercedes-AMG GT3 Evo	Mercedes-AMG M159 6.2 L V8	48	(Australia) Roger Lago	PA 2-4; Am 1	1
(Australia) M Motorsport	Mercedes-AMG GT3 Evo	Mercedes-AMG M159 6.2 L V8	48	(Australia) Glen Wood	PA 2-4; Am 1	2–3
(Australia) M Motorsport	Mercedes-AMG GT3 Evo	Mercedes-AMG M159 6.2 L V8	48	(Australia) David Russell	PA 2-4; Am 1	4
(Australia) Schumacher Motorsport	Audi R8 LMS Evo II	Audi 5.2 L V10	55	(Australia) Brad Schumacher	Am	All
(Australia) Stephen Coe Racing	Ferrari 458 Italia GT3	Ferrari 4.5 L V8	56	(Australia) Stephen Coe	T	1
(Malaysia) JMR Triple Eight Race Engineering	Mercedes-AMG GT3 Evo	Mercedes-AMG M159 6.2 L V8	88	(Malaysia) Prince Abu Bakar Ibrahim	PA	1–2, 4–5
(Malaysia) JMR Triple Eight Race Engineering	Mercedes-AMG GT3 Evo	Mercedes-AMG M159 6.2 L V8	88	(Australia) Jamie Whincup	PA	1–2, 4–5
(Malaysia) JMR Triple Eight Race Engineering	Mercedes-AMG GT3 Evo	Mercedes-AMG M159 6.2 L V8	888	(Malaysia) Prince Jefri Ibrahim	PA	1–2, 4–5
(Malaysia) JMR Triple Eight Race Engineering	Mercedes-AMG GT3 Evo	Mercedes-AMG M159 6.2 L V8	888	(Australia) Broc Feeney	PA	1, 5
(Malaysia) JMR Triple Eight Race Engineering	Mercedes-AMG GT3 Evo	Mercedes-AMG M159 6.2 L V8	888	(New Zealand) Richie Stanaway	PA	2, 4
GTC
(Australia) Sonic Motor Racing Services	Porsche 991 GT3 II Cup	Porsche 4.0 L Flat-6	78	(Australia) Marcos Flack	T	1, 6
(New Zealand) Earl Bamber Motorsport	Porsche 991 GT3 II Cup	Porsche 4.0 L Flat-6	81	(Australia) Tom McLennan	T	6
GT4
(Australia) Nineteen Motorsport (Note: Entered as Daimler Trucks Brisbane.)	Mercedes-AMG GT4	Mercedes-AMG M178 4.0 L V8	19	(Australia) Mark Griffith	GT4	2, 4
Invitational
(Australia) Milldun Motorsport	MARC Mazda 3 V8	Ford 5.0 L Coyote V8	4	(Australia) Darren Currie	INV	1
(Australia) Milldun Motorsport	MARC II V8	Ford Modular 5.2 L V8	4	(Australia) Darren Currie	INV	5–6
(Australia) Milldun Motorsport	MARC II V8	Ford Modular 5.2 L V8	4	(Australia) Geoff Taunton	INV	6
(Australia) Milldun Motorsport	MARC II V8	Ford Modular 5.2 L V8	95	(Australia) Geoff Taunton	INV	1
(Australia) Milldun Motorsport	MARC II V8	Ford Modular 5.2 L V8	95	(Australia) Darren Currie	INV	3
(Australia) Milldun Motorsport	MARC GT	GM LS3 6.2 L V8	6	(Australia) John Goodacre	INV	6
(Australia) Milldun Motorsport	MARC GT	GM LS3 6.2 L V8	20	(New Zealand) Daniel Jilesen	INV	3, 5
(Australia) Milldun Motorsport	MARC GT	GM LS3 6.2 L V8	20	(Australia) Geoff Taunton	INV	3, 5
(Australia) Milldun Motorsport	MARC GT	GM LS3 6.2 L V8	20	(Australia) Adam Hargraves	INV	6
(Australia) Milldun Motorsport	MARC Focus GTC	Ford Modular 5.2 L V8	111	(Australia) Grant Donaldson	INV	1
(Australia) Milldun Motorsport	MARC II V8	Ford Modular 5.2 L V8	111	(Australia) Grant Donaldson	INV	6
(Australia) M Motorsport	KTM X-Bow GT2 Concept	Audi 2.5 L I5	50	(Australia) David Crampton	INV	4
(Australia) M Motorsport	KTM X-Bow GT2 Concept	Audi 2.5 L I5	50	(Australia) Trent Harrison	INV	4

Icon	Class
PA	Pro-Am Cup
Am	Am Cup
T	Trophy Cup
GT4	GT4 Cup
INV	Invitational

== Race results ==
Bold indicates the overall winner.

Round		Circuit	Pole position	Pro-Am winners	Am winners	Trophy winners	GT4 Winners	Invitational Winners
1	R1	(New South Wales) Bathurst	(Australia) No. 65 Melbourne Performance Centre	**(Australia) No. 65 Melbourne Performance Centre**	(Australia) No. 55 Schumacher Motorsport	(Australia) No. 78 Sonic Motor Racing Services	No Entries	(Australia) No. 95 Mildun Motorsport
1	R1	(New South Wales) Bathurst	(Austria) Max Hofer (Australia) Liam Talbot	**(Austria) Max Hofer** **(Australia) Liam Talbot**	(Australia) Brad Schumacher	(Australia) Marcos Flack	No Entries	(Australia) Geoff Taunton
1	R2	(New South Wales) Bathurst	(Malaysia) No. 888 JMR Triple Eight Race Engineering	**(Australia) No. 65 Melbourne Performance Centre**	(Australia) No. 55 Schumacher Motorsport	(Australia) No. 78 Sonic Motor Racing Services	No Entries	(Australia) No. 95 Mildun Motorsport
1	R2	(New South Wales) Bathurst	(Australia) Broc Feeney (Malaysia) Prince Jefri Ibrahim	**(Austria) Max Hofer** **(Australia) Liam Talbot**	(Australia) Brad Schumacher	(Australia) Marcos Flack	No Entries	(Australia) Geoff Taunton
2	R1	(Western Australia) Wanneroo	(Australia) No. 75 Melbourne Performance Centre	**(Australia) No. 1 EMA Motorsport**	(Australia) No. 55 Schumacher Motorsport	(Australia) No. 181 Melbourne Performance Centre	(Australia) No. 19 Nineteen Motorsport	No Entries
2	R1	(Western Australia) Wanneroo	(Australia) Geoff Emery (Germany) Christopher Mies	**(Australia) Garnet Patterson** **(Australia) Yasser Shahin**	(Australia) Brad Schumacher	(Australia) Renee Gracie	(Australia) Mark Griffith	No Entries
2	R2	(Western Australia) Wanneroo	(Australia) No. 65 Melbourne Performance Centre	**(Australia) No. 65 Melbourne Performance Centre**	(Australia) No. 55 Schumacher Motorsport	(Australia) No. 181 Melbourne Performance Centre	(Australia) No. 19 Nineteen Motorsport	No Entries
2	R2	(Western Australia) Wanneroo	(Austria) Max Hofer (Australia) Liam Talbot	**(Austria) Max Hofer** **(Australia) Liam Talbot**	(Australia) Brad Schumacher	(Australia) Renee Gracie	(Australia) Mark Griffith	No Entries
3	R1	(Victoria (state)) Phillip Island	(Australia) No. 65 Melbourne Performance Centre	**(Australia) No. 101 Harrolds Volante Rosso**	No. 45 GWR Australia/RAM Motorsport	(Australia) No. 181 Melbourne Performance Centre	No Entries	(Australia) No. 95 Mildun Motorsport
3	R1	(Victoria (state)) Phillip Island	(Australia) Fraser Ross (Australia) Liam Talbot	**(Australia) Jayden Ojeda** **(Australia) Ross Poulakis**	(Australia) Mike Sheargold (Australia) Garth Walden	(Australia) Renee Gracie	No Entries	(Australia) Darren Currie
3	R2	(Victoria (state)) Phillip Island	(Australia) No. 101 Harrolds Volante Rosso	**(Australia) No. 75 Melbourne Performance Centre**	(Australia) No. 55 Schumacher Motorsport	(Australia) No. 181 Melbourne Performance Centre	No Entries	(Australia) No. 95 Mildun Motorsport
3	R2	(Victoria (state)) Phillip Island	(Australia) Jayden Ojeda (Australia) Ross Poulakis	**(Australia) Geoff Emery** **(Austria) Max Hofer**	(Australia) Brad Schumacher	(Australia) Renee Gracie	No Entries	(Australia) Darren Currie
4	R1	(New South Wales) Sydney	(Australia) No. 65 Melbourne Performance Centre	**(Australia) No. 1 EMA Motorsport**	(Australia) No. 23 Melbourne Performance Centre	(Australia) No. 181 Melbourne Performance Centre	(Australia) No. 19 Nineteen Motorsport	(Australia) No. 50 M Motorsport
4	R1	(New South Wales) Sydney	(Australia) Fraser Ross (Australia) Liam Talbot	**(Australia) Garnet Patterson** **(Australia) Yasser Shahin**	(Australia) Matt Stoupas (Australia) Paul Stokell	(Australia) Renee Gracie	(Australia) Mark Griffith	(Australia) David Crampton (Australia) Trent Harrison
4	R2	(New South Wales) Sydney	(Australia) No. 101 Harrolds Volante	**(Australia) No. 65 Melbourne Performance Centre**	(Australia) No. 55 Schumacher Motorsport	(Australia) No. 181 Melbourne Performance Centre	(Australia) No. 19 Nineteen Motorsport	(Australia) No. 50 M Motorsport
4	R2	(New South Wales) Sydney	(Australia) Jayden Ojeda (Australia) Ross Poulakis	**(Australia) Fraser Ross** **(Australia) Liam Talbot**	(Australia) Brad Schumacher	(Australia) Renee Gracie	(Australia) Mark Griffith	(Australia) David Crampton (Australia) Trent Harrison
5	R1	Queensland	(Australia) No. 65 Melbourne Performance Centre	**(Australia) No. 75 Melbourne Performance Centre**	(Australia) No. 23 Melbourne Performance Centre	(Australia) No. 181 Melbourne Performance Centre	No Entries	(Australia) No. 20 Mildun Motorsport
5	R1	Queensland	(Australia) Liam Talbot (Australia) Garth Tander	**(Australia) Geoff Emery** **(Austria) Max Hofer**	(Australia) Matt Stoupas (Australia) Paul Stokell	(Australia) Renee Gracie	No Entries	(Australia) Geoff Taunton (New Zealand) Daniel Jilesen
5	R2	Queensland	(Australia) No. 101 Harrolds Volante Rosso	**(Australia) No. 65 Melbourne Performance Centre**	(Australia) No. 55 Schumacher Motorsport	(Australia) No. 181 Melbourne Performance Centre	No Entries	(Australia) No. 20 Mildun Motorsport
5	R2	Queensland	(Australia) Jayden Ojeda (Australia) Ross Poulakis	**(Australia) Liam Talbot** **(Australia) Garth Tander**	(Australia) Brad Schumacher	(Australia) Renee Gracie	No Entries	(Australia) Geoff Taunton (New Zealand) Daniel Jilesen
6	R1	(South Australia) Adelaide	(Australia) No. 1 EMA Motorsport	**(Australia) No. 1 EMA Motorsport**	(Australia) No. 55 Schumacher Motorsport	(Australia) No. 78 Sonic Motor Racing Services	No Entries	(Australia) No. 6 Mildun Motorsport
6	R1	(South Australia) Adelaide	(Australia) Matt Campbell (Australia) Yasser Shahin	**(Australia) Matt Campbell** **(Australia) Yasser Shahin**	(Australia) Brad Schumacher	(Australia) Marcos Flack	No Entries	(Australia) John Goodacre
6	R2	(South Australia) Adelaide	(Australia) No. 65 Melbourne Performance Centre	**(Australia) No. 65 Melbourne Performance Centre**	(Australia) No. 23 Melbourne Performance Centre	(Australia) No. 78 Sonic Motor Racing Services	No Entries	(Australia) No. 20 Mildun Motorsport
6	R2	(South Australia) Adelaide	(Germany) Christopher Mies (Australia) Liam Talbot	**(Germany) Christopher Mies** **(Australia) Liam Talbot**	(Australia) Matt Stoupas (Australia) Paul Stokell	(Australia) Marcos Flack	No Entries	(Australia) Adam Hargraves
6	R3	(South Australia) Adelaide	(Australia) No. 1 EMA Motorsport	**(Australia) No. 1 EMA Motorsport**	(Australia) No. 55 Schumacher Motorsport	(Australia) No. 78 Sonic Motor Racing Services	No Entries	(Australia) No. 4 Mildun Motorsport
6	R3	(South Australia) Adelaide	(Australia) Matt Campbell (Australia) Yasser Shahin	**(Australia) Matt Campbell** **(Australia) Yasser Shahin**	(Australia) Brad Schumacher	(Australia) Marcos Flack	No Entries	(Australia) Geoff Taunton (Australia) Darren Currie

== Championship Standings ==
Scoring system (Sprint Cup Rounds 1-5)

Position	**1st**	**2nd**	**3rd**	**4th**	**5th**	**6th**	**7th**	**8th**	**9th**	**10th**
Points	25	18	15	12	10	8	6	4	2	1

Scoring system (Round 6)

Position	**1st**	**2nd**	**3rd**	**4th**	**5th**	**6th**	**7th**	**8th**	**9th**	**10th**
Points	17	12	10	8	7	5	4	3	2	1

=== Pro-Am Cup ===
Pos	Driver	Team	BAT (New South Wales)		WAN (Western Australia)		PHI (Victoria (state))		SYD (New South Wales)		QUE (Queensland)		ADL (South Australia)			Points
1	(Australia) Liam Talbot	(Australia) Melbourne Performance Centre	**1**	1	Ret	**1**	**6**	2	**3**	1	**4**	1	2	**1**	3	217
2	(Australia) Geoff Emery	(Australia) Melbourne Performance Centre	3	3	**3**	2	3	1	4	4	1	2	3	3	2	202
3	(Australia) Yasser Shahin	(Australia) EMA Motorsport	2	4	1	4	4	3	1	5	2	6	**1**	2	**1**	201
4	(Australia) Garnet Patterson	(Australia) EMA Motorsport	2	4	1	4	4	3	1	5	2	6				155
5	(Australia) Ross Poulakis	(Australia) Harrolds Volante Rosso	6	6	5	5	1	**4**	5	**2**	5	**4**				123
6	(Australia) Jayden Ojeda	(Australia) Harrolds Volante Rosso			5	5	1	**4**	5	**2**	5	**4**	Ret	5	Ret	114
7	(Malaysia) Prince Abu Bakar Ibrahim (Australia) Jamie Whincup	(Malaysia) JMR Triple Eight Race Engineering	4	5	2	6			6	3	3	3				101
8	(Malaysia) Prince Jefri Ibrahim	(Malaysia) JMR Triple Eight Race Engineering	5	**2**	4	3			2	Ret	6	5				91
9	(Australia) Michael Bailey (Australia) Brett Hobson	GWR Australia/RAM Motorsport	7	7	7	9	7	7	7	6	7	7	4	4	4	84
10	(Austria) Max Hofer (Note: Hofer was ineligible for points from the third round onwards.)	(Australia) Melbourne Performance Centre	**1**	1	Ret	**1**	3	1	4	4	1	2	3	3	2	75
11	(Germany) Christopher Mies	(Australia) Melbourne Performance Centre			**3**	2							2	**1**	3	72
12	(Australia) Fraser Ross	(Australia) Melbourne Performance Centre					**6**	2	**3**	1						64
12	(Australia) Broc Feeney	(Malaysia) JMR Triple Eight Race Engineering	5	**2**							6	5				46
13	(New Zealand) Richie Stanaway	(Malaysia) JMR Triple Eight Race Engineering			4	3			2	Ret						45
14	(Germany) Christer Jöns	(Australia) Melbourne Performance Centre	3	3												30
15	(Australia) Brenton Grove (Australia) Stephen Grove	(Australia) Grove Racing					2	5								28
16	(Australia) Justin McMillan	(Australia) M Motorsport			Ret	8	5	6	8	7						22 (Note: Justin McMillan and Glen Wood had 10 penalty points deducted from their original totals of 32 and 22, leaving them with 22 and 12 points respectively.)
17	(Australia) Sam Brabham	(Australia) Harrolds Volante Rosso	6	6			8	9								22
18	(Australia) Chris Batzios	(Australia) Harrolds Volante Rosso					8	9			8	8	Ret	5	Ret	21
19	(Australia) Tony Bates (Australia) Jordan Love	(Australia) Ashley Seward Motorsport			6	7										14
20	(Australia) Glen Wood	(Australia) M Motorsport			Ret	8	5	6								12
22	(Australia) David Russell	(Australia) M Motorsport							8	7						10
21	(New Zealand) Andrew Fawcet (Australia) Dylan O'Keeffe	(Australia) Melbourne Performance Centre					Ret	8								4
22	(Australia) Adrian Deitz (Australia) David Wall	(Australia) Wall Racing					Ret	DNS								0
Entries ineligible for points
—	(Australia) Matt Campbell	(Australia) EMA Motorsport											**1**	2	**1**	0
—	(Australia) Garth Tander	(Australia) Melbourne Performance Centre									**4**	1				0
—	(Australia) Josh Hunt	(Australia) Harrolds Volante Rosso									8	8				0
Pos	Driver	Team	BAT (New South Wales)		WAN (Western Australia)		PHI (Victoria (state))		SYD (New South Wales)		QUE (Queensland)		ADL (South Australia)			Points

Key
Colour	Result
Gold	Race winner
Silver	2nd place
Bronze	3rd place
Green	Points finish
Blue	Non-points finish
Blue	Non-classified finish (NC)
Purple	Did not finish (Ret)
Black	Disqualified (DSQ)
Black	Excluded (EX)
White	Did not start (DNS)
White	Race cancelled (C)
White	Withdrew (WD)
Blank	Did not participate

**Bold** – Pole
Italics – Fastest lap

=== Am Cup ===
Pos	Driver	Team	BAT (New South Wales)		WAN (Western Australia)		PHI (Victoria (state))		SYD (New South Wales)		QUE (Queensland)		ADL (South Australia)			Points
1	(Australia) Brad Schumacher	(Australia) Schumacher Motorsport	**1**	**1**	**1**	**1**	**2**	**1**	**2**	1	Ret	1	**1**	**3**	**1**	255
2	(Australia) Matt Stoupas (Australia) Paul Stokell	(Australia) Melbourne Performance Centre	2	2	2	2	3	2	1	**4**	**1**	**2**	2	1	3	226
3	(Australia) Michael Sheargold (Australia) Garth Walden	GWR Australia/RAM Motorsport	5	3	4	4	1	Ret	3	5	2	5	4	5	4	154
4	(Australia) Ash Samadi	(Australia) Melbourne Performance Centre	4	5	3	5	7	4	5	6	3	3				113
5	(Australia) Marcel Zalloua (Australia) Sergio Pires	(Australia) Tigani Motorsport	3	4			4	3	6	2	4	4				104
6	(Australia) Michael Kokkinos	(Australia) Melbourne Performance Centre	6	6	5	3	5	6								59
7	(Australia) Theo Koundouris	(Australia) Tigani Motorsport							4	3			6	4	5	49
8	(Australia) George Nakas (Australia) Ben Stack	(Australia) Dutton Garage					6	5								18
9	(Australia) Justin McMillan (Australia) Roger Lago	(Australia) M Motorsport	7	7												12
Entries ineligible for points
—	(Australia) Renee Gracie	(Australia) Melbourne Performance Centre											3	2	2	0
—	(Australia) James Koundouris	(Australia) Tigani Motorsport											6	4	5	0
—	(Australia) Marc Cini	(Australia) Melbourne Performance Centre											5	5	6	0
Pos	Driver	Team	BAT (New South Wales)		WAN (Western Australia)		PHI (Victoria (state))		SYD (New South Wales)		QUE (Queensland)		ADL (South Australia)			Points

=== Trophy Cup ===
Pos	Driver	Team	BAT (New South Wales)		WAN (Western Australia)		PHI (Victoria (state))		SYD (New South Wales)		QUE (Queensland)		ADL (South Australia)			Points
1	(Australia) Renee Gracie	(Australia) Melbourne Performance Centre			**1**	**1**	**1**	**1**	**1**	**1**	**1**	**1**				200
2	(Australia) Paul Luchitti	(Australia) Tigani Motorsport					2	2	2	2	Ret	2	3	3	3	126
3	(Australia) Marcos Flack	(Australia) Sonic Motor Racing Services	**1**	**1**									**1**	**1**	**1**	101
4	(Australia) Stephen Coe	(Australia) Stephen Coe Racing	2	2												36
Entries ineligible for points
—	(Australia) Tom McLennan	(New Zealand) Earl Bamber Motorsport											2	2	2	0
Pos	Driver	Team	BAT (New South Wales)		WAN (Western Australia)		PHI (Victoria (state))		SYD (New South Wales)		QUE (Queensland)		ADL (South Australia)			Points

=== GT4 Cup ===
Pos	Driver	Team	BAT (New South Wales)	WAN (Western Australia)		PHI (Victoria (state))	SYD (New South Wales)		QUE (Queensland)	ADL (South Australia)	Points
1	(Australia) Mark Griffith	(Australia) Nineteen Motorsport		**1**	**1**		**1**	**1**			100
Pos	Driver	Team	BAT (New South Wales)	WAN (Western Australia)		PHI (Victoria (state))	SYD (New South Wales)		QUE (Queensland)	ADL (South Australia)	Points

=== Invitational Cup ===
Pos	Driver	Team	BAT (New South Wales)		WAN (Western Australia)	PHI (Victoria (state))		SYD (New South Wales)		QUE (Queensland)		ADL (South Australia)			Points
1	(Australia) Geoff Taunton	(Australia) Milldun Motorsport	**1**	**1**		2	2			**1**	**1**	**Ret**	2	**1**	186
2	(Australia) Darren Currie	(Australia) Milldun Motorsport	2	2		**1**	**1**			2	2	Ret	2	1	172
3	(New Zealand) Daniel Jilesen	(Australia) Milldun Motorsport				2	2			**1**	**1**				86
4	(Australia) Grant Donaldson	(Australia) Milldun Motorsport	Ret	3								2	**4**	4	76
5	(Australia) David Crampton (Australia) Trent Harrison	(Australia) M Motorsport						**1**	**1**						50
Entries ineligible for points
—	(Australia) John Goodacre	(Australia) Milldun Motorsport										1	3	2	0
—	(Australia) Adam Hargraves	(Australia) Milldun Motorsport										3	1	3	0
Pos	Driver	Team	BAT (New South Wales)		WAN (Western Australia)	PHI (Victoria (state))		SYD (New South Wales)		QUE (Queensland)		ADL (South Australia)			Points

== See also ==
- 2023 British GT Championship
- 2023 GT World Challenge Europe Endurance Cup
- 2023 GT World Challenge Europe Sprint Cup
- 2023 GT World Challenge Asia
- 2023 GT World Challenge America
- 2023 Intercontinental GT Challenge
