= Renee Gracie =

Australian adult-film actress and racing driver

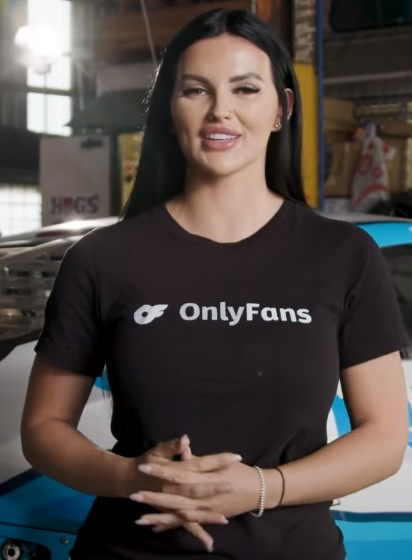
- Gracie promoting her OnlyFans content in 2023
- Nationality: Australian
- Born: Renee Elise Gracie; 5 January 1995 (age 31) Brisbane, Queensland, Australia

GT World Challenge Australia career
- Debut season: 2023
- Current team: OnlyFans Racing
- Categorisation: FIA Silver (until 2024); FIA Bronze (2025–)
- Car number: 181
- Former teams: Melbourne Performance Centre
- Starts: 33
- Wins: 15
- Podiums: 18
- Poles: 15
- Best finish: 1st in 2023, 2025

Previous series
- 2012 2013–14 2015–16: Aussie Racing Cars; Porsche Carrera Cup Australia; V8 Supercars

Championship titles
- 2023 2025: GT World Challenge Australia GT Trophy; GT World Challenge Australia GT Am

Renee Elise Gracie (born 5 January 1995) is an Australian adult film actress and racing driver.

== Early life ==
Gracie was born in Brisbane and grew up in the southern outskirts in Kuraby. She attended John Paul College throughout her upbringing and moved with her family to the northern suburbs of the Gold Coast in her teenage years.

== Racing career ==
=== Porsche Carrera Cup ===
After a successful stint in kart racing, Gracie contested the 2014 and 2015 seasons of the Porsche Carrera Cup Australia Championship. In 2013, she was the first female to compete in that championship. The following year, she achieved five top 10 race results and a 100 percent race finishing record.

=== V8 Supercars ===
In 2015, Gracie switched to the Supercars Dunlop Series, in which she drove for Paul Morris Motorsport, and was the first full-time female competitor in 14 years. At the end of that year, she was classified 18th in the championship standings, with 634 points and a best race result of 12th.

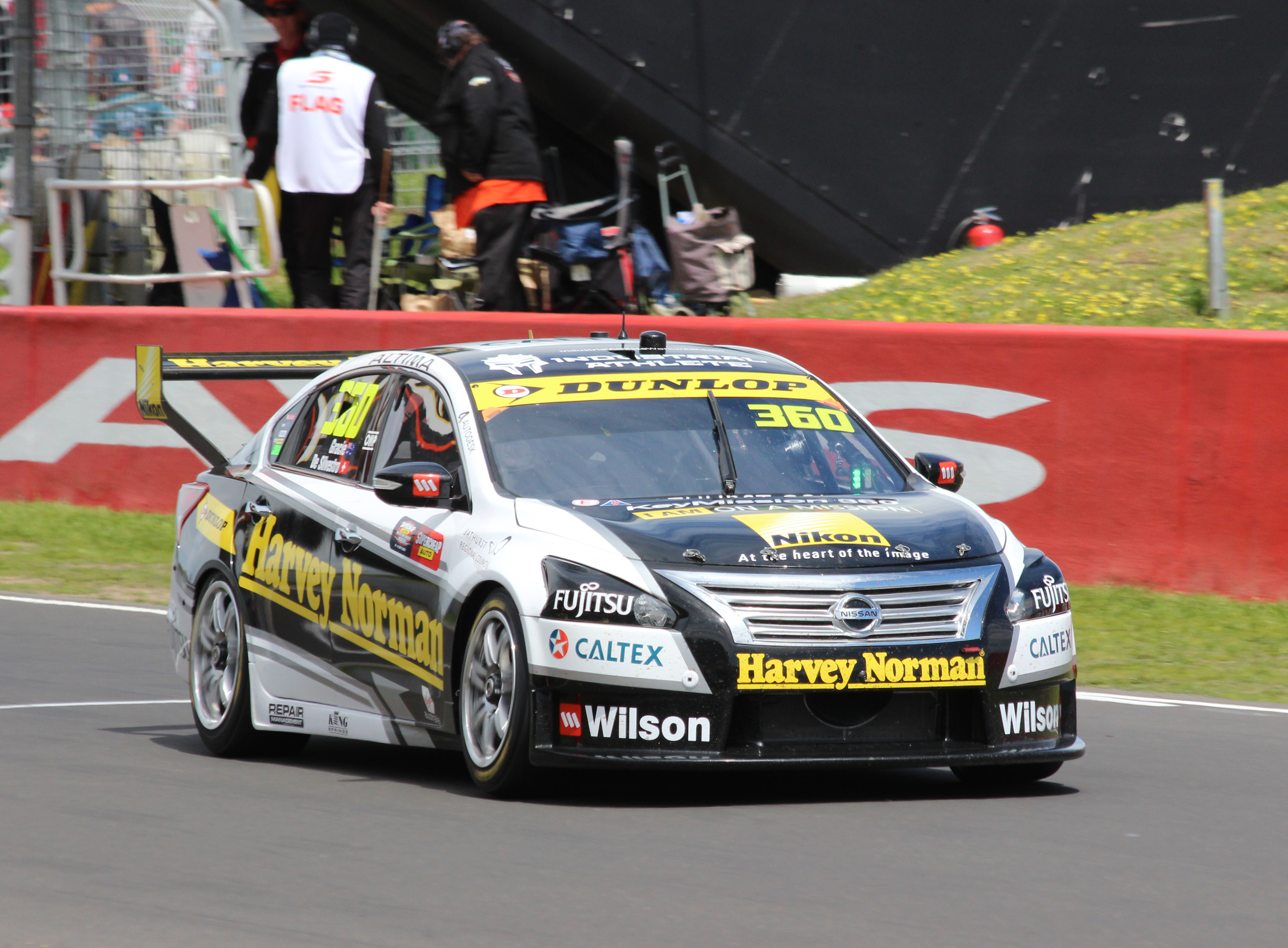
The Renee Gracie and Simona de Silvestro wildcard entry at the 2016 Bathurst 1000

On 19 August 2015, it was announced that Gracie would partner Simona de Silvestro in a Ford FG X Falcon fielded by Prodrive Racing Australia in the Bathurst 1000 for V8 Supercars. It was the first female pairing at Bathurst since Melinda Price and Kerryn Brewer finished 11th in 1998. On lap 15 of the race, the Falcon, running under the "Harvey Norman Supergirls" banner, was severely damaged in an oil slick-induced impact by Gracie with the wall at Forrest's Elbow. After undergoing extensive repairs, it was sent back out, with de Silvestro at the wheel, to finish 21st, 40 laps down on the winning pair of Craig Lowndes and Steven Richards.

In 2016, Gracie competed in her second season of the Supercars Dunlop Series, once again for Paul Morris Motorsport. She also teamed up with de Silvestro for a second assault at the Bathurst 1000, this time in a Nissan Altima L33 prepared by Nissan Motorsport. Despite starting the race on the back row in 26th position, Gracie and de Silvestro had no major issues during the race, and managed to stay out of trouble to finish 14th in the chaotic final laps.

Gracie moved to Dragon Motor Sport for a third season in the renamed Super2 Series. After a string of poor results with only one top-10 finish in 17 races and a lack of available funds, she was replaced with Kumho Series driver Jordan Boys.

=== GT World Challenge Australia ===
Gracie returned to racing through the GT World Challenge Australia series at the 2023 Perth SuperSprint. Driving a first-generation Audi R8 GT3 LMS Ultra in the Trophy Class, she won the title as one of only two concurrent entries in her class and four in total.

Gracie contested a second season of the series in 2024, driving an up-to-date Audi R8 in the top class alongside Paul Stokell.

== Adult film career ==
In 2019, Gracie began working as an adult film actress and uploading adult content to subscription site OnlyFans, claiming "racing cars is not my passion anymore." She joined the adult industry after not being able to make money from racing cars. Her father also supports her career in pornography.

== Racing record ==
=== Career summary ===
Season	Series	Team	Races	Wins	Poles	F/laps	Podiums	Points	Position
2012	Aussie Racing Cars Super Series	Aussie Racing Cars	4	0	0	0	0	38	31st
2013	Porsche Carrera Cup Australia Championship	McElrea Racing	19	0	0	0	0	173.5	19th
2014	Porsche Carrera Cup Australia Championship	McElrea Racing	22	0	0	0	0	322.5	15th
2015	V8 Supercars Dunlop Series	Paul Morris Motorsport	16	0	0	0	0	634	18th
2015	International V8 Supercars Championship	Prodrive Racing Australia	1	0	0	0	0	84	21st
2016	Supercars Dunlop Series	Paul Morris Motorsport	15	0	0	0	0	594	19th
2016	International V8 Supercars Championship	Nissan Motorsport	1	0	0	0	0	126	14th
2017	Super2 Series	Dragon Motor Racing; Image Racing	17	0	0	0	0	534	23rd
2023	GT World Challenge Australia - GT Trophy	Nineteen Corporation (Note: Car entered under the commercial title "OnlyFans".)	8	8	8	0	8	200	**1st**
2023	GT World Challenge Australia - GT Am	Nineteen Corporation	3	0	0	0	0	0	-
2024	GT World Challenge Australia - Pro-Am	Melbourne Performance Centre (Note: Car entered under the commercial title "OnlyFans Team MPC".)	10	0	0	0	0	60	8th
2025	GT World Challenge Australia - GT Am	Melbourne Performance Centre (Note: Car entered under the commercial title "OnlyFans Team MPC".)	10	7	7	0	10	236	**1st**
2025	GT World Challenge Australia - Pro-Am	Melbourne Performance Centre	2	0	0	0	0	0	-
2026	GT World Challenge Australia - Pro-Am	OnlyFans Racing							

=== Complete Super2 Series results ===
(key) (Round results only)

Super2 Series results
Year	Team	Car	No.	1	2	3	4	5	6	7	8	Position	Points
2015	Paul Morris Motorsport	Ford FG Falcon	55	ADE; 21	BAR; 16	WIN; 21	TOW; 20	QLD; 20	BAT; 19	HOM; 14		18th	634
2016	Paul Morris Motorsport	Ford FG Falcon	98	ADE; 22	PHI; 22	BAR; 19	TOW; 15	SAN; 12	BAT	HOM; 12		19th	594
2017	Dragon Motor Racing Image Racing	Holden VF Commodore	98	ADE; 12	SYM; 19	PHI; 20	TOW; 12	SYD; 19	SAN	BAT	NEW	23rd	534

=== Complete Supercars Championship results ===
V8 Supercar results
Year	Team	Car	1	2	3	4	5	6	7	8	9	10	11	12	13	14	15	16	17	18	19	20	21	22	23	24	25	26	27	28	29	30	31	32	33	34	35	36	Position	Points
2015	Prodrive Racing Australia	Ford FG X Falcon	ADE; R1	ADE; R2	ADE; R3	SYM; R4	SYM; R5	SYM; R6	BAR; R7	BAR; R8	BAR; R9	WIN; R10	WIN; R11	WIN; R12	HID; R13	HID; R14	HID; R15	TOW; R16	TOW; R17	QLD; R18	QLD; R19	QLD; R20	SMP; R21	SMP; R22	SMP; R23	SAN; R24	BAT; R25; 21	SUR; R26	SUR; R27	PUK; R28	PUK; R29	PUK; R30	PHI; R31	PHI; R32	PHI; R33	SYD; R34	SYD; R35	SYD; R36	54th	84
2016	Nissan Motorsport	Nissan Altima L33	ADE; R1	ADE; R2	ADE; R3	SYM; R4	SYM; R5	PHI; R6	PHI; R7	BAR; R8	BAR; R9	WIN; R10	WIN; R11	HID; R12	HID; R13	HID; R14	TOW; R15	QLD; R16	QLD; R17	SMP; R18	SMP; R19	SAN; R20	BAT; R21; 14	SUR; R22	SUR; R23	PUK; R24	PUK; R25	PUK; R26	PUK; R27	SYD; R28	SYD; R29								54th	126

=== Complete Bathurst 1000 results ===
Year	Team	Car	Co-driver	Position	Laps
2015	Prodrive Racing Australia	Ford Falcon FG X	(Switzerland) Simona de Silvestro	21st	121
2016	Nissan Motorsport	Nissan Altima L33	(Switzerland) Simona de Silvestro	14th	159

=== Complete GT World Challenge Australia results ===
(key) (Races in bold indicate pole position) (Races in italics indicate fastest lap)

Year	Team	Car	Class	1	2	3	4	5	6	7	8	9	10	11	12	13	Pos.	Points
2023	Melbourne Performance Centre	Audi R8 LMS Ultra	Trophy	BAT; 1	BAT; 2	**WAN**; **1**; **1**	**WAN**; **2**; **1**	**PHI**; **1**; **1**	**PHI**; **2**; **1**	**SMP**; **1**; **1**	**SMP**; **2**; **1**	**QUE**; **1**; **1**	**QUE**; **2**; **1**				1st	200
2023	Melbourne Performance Centre	Audi R8 LMS Evo II	Am											ADL; 1; 3	ADL; 2; 2	ADL; 3; 2	N/A*	N/A*
2024	Melbourne Performance Centre	Audi R8 LMS Evo II	Pro-Am	PHI1; 1; 8	PHI1; 2; 6	BEN; 1; 6	BEN; 2 Ret	QUE; 1 Ret	QUE; 2; 7	PHI2; 1; 6	PHI2; 2; 5	BAT; 1; 8	BAT; 2; 5				8th	60
2025	Melbourne Performance Centre	Audi R8 LMS Evo II	Am	**PHI**; **1**; **2**	PHI; 2; 1	**SYD**; **1**; **1**	**SYD**; **2**; **1**	**QLD**; **1**; **1**	**QLD**; **2**; **1**	SAN; 1; 2	SAN; 2; 1	**BEN**; **1**; **2**	**BEN**; **2**; **1**				1st	236
2025	Melbourne Performance Centre	Audi R8 LMS Evo II	Pro-Am											HAM; 2; 5	HAM; 2 Ret		N/A*	N/A*
2026	OnlyFans Racing	Ferrari 296 GT3	Pro-Am	PHI; 1; 7	PHI; 2 Ret	BEN; 1; 5	BEN; 2; 12	QLD; 1; 1	QLD; 2; 8	HID; 1; 3	HID; 2; 8	SYD; 1; 8	SYD; 2; 5	ADL; 1	ADL; 2		9th*	80*

- Gracie was ineligible for points
