= 2025 GT World Challenge Australia =

Australian motorsport championship season

The 2025 GT World Challenge Australia Powered by AWS was an Australian motor sport competition for GT3 cars. This was the second season since the SRO Motorsports Group took over sole management of the series. The season started at Phillip Island on April 5 and finished at Hampton Downs in New Zealand on November 2.

== Calendar ==
The provisional six-round calendar was announced at the 2024 SRO Press conference at the 24 Hours of Spa. For the first time the series had a media day at Phillip Island. On 18 October, the calendar was updated, in which the Queensland round was shifted to June and the championship confirmed to return to Sandown Raceway after 3 years.

Unlike previous years where most race weekends were run by another promoter as part of the SpeedSeries event series, in 2025 the SRO took over as event promoter as well as category promoter. Other categories at the race meetings included the Radical Cup Australia and GT4 Australia.

| Round | Circuit | City / State | Date | Map | |
|---|---|---|---|---|---|
| 1 | (Victoria (state)) Phillip Island Grand Prix Circuit | Phillip Island, Victoria | 4–6 April | 2025 GT World Challenge Australia is located in Australia | 2025 GT World Challenge Australia is located in New Zealand |
| 2 | (New South Wales) Sydney Motorsport Park | Eastern Creek, New South Wales | 2–4 May | 2025 GT World Challenge Australia is located in Australia | 2025 GT World Challenge Australia is located in New Zealand |
| 3 | Queensland Raceway | Ipswich, Queensland | 30 May–1 June | 2025 GT World Challenge Australia is located in Australia | 2025 GT World Challenge Australia is located in New Zealand |
| 4 | (Victoria (state)) Sandown Raceway | Melbourne, Victoria | 25–27 July | 2025 GT World Challenge Australia is located in Australia | 2025 GT World Challenge Australia is located in New Zealand |
| 5 | (South Australia) The Bend Motorsport Park | Tailem Bend, South Australia | 5–7 September | 2025 GT World Challenge Australia is located in Australia | 2025 GT World Challenge Australia is located in New Zealand |
| 6 | (New Zealand) Hampton Downs Motorsport Park | North Waikato, New Zealand | 31 October–2 November | 2025 GT World Challenge Australia is located in Australia | 2025 GT World Challenge Australia is located in New Zealand |

== Entry list ==
| Team | Car | Engine | No. | Drivers | Class | Rounds |
|---|---|---|---|---|---|---|
| (Australia) Volante Rosso Motorsport | Aston Martin Vantage AMR GT3 | Aston Martin AMR16A 4.0 L Turbo V8 | 1 | (Australia) Liam Talbot | PA | All |
| (Australia) Volante Rosso Motorsport | Aston Martin Vantage AMR GT3 | Aston Martin AMR16A 4.0 L Turbo V8 | 1 | (Australia) Declan Fraser | PA | 1–3 |
| (Australia) Volante Rosso Motorsport | Aston Martin Vantage AMR GT3 | Aston Martin AMR16A 4.0 L Turbo V8 | 1 | (United Arab Emirates) Jamie Day | PA | 4–5 |
| (Australia) Volante Rosso Motorsport | Aston Martin Vantage AMR GT3 | Aston Martin AMR16A 4.0 L Turbo V8 | 1 | (Australia) Josh Hunt | PA | 6 |
| (Australia) Melbourne Performance Centre (Note: Car No. 7 entered as Dayle ITM, No. 9 as Hallmarc, No. 24 as KFC, No. 88 as Wolfbrook, No. 181 as OnlyFans, and No. 888 as Kelso Electrical.) | Audi R8 LMS Evo II | Audi DAR 5.2 L V10 | 7 | (New Zealand) Brendon Leitch | PA | 1–3 |
| (Australia) Melbourne Performance Centre | Audi R8 LMS Evo II | Audi DAR 5.2 L V10 | 7 | (New Zealand) Tim Miles | PA | 1–3 |
| (Australia) Melbourne Performance Centre | Audi R8 LMS Evo II | Audi DAR 5.2 L V10 | 9 | (Australia) Lee Holdsworth | PA | 4 |
| (Australia) Melbourne Performance Centre | Audi R8 LMS Evo II | Audi DAR 5.2 L V10 | 9 | (Australia) Marc Cini | PA | 4 |
| (Australia) Melbourne Performance Centre | Audi R8 LMS Evo | Audi DAR 5.2 L V10 | 24 | (Australia) Gary Higgon | T | 2–3, 5 |
| (Australia) Melbourne Performance Centre | Audi R8 LMS Evo | Audi DAR 5.2 L V10 | 24 | (Australia) Matt Stoupas | T | 2, 4–5 |
| (Australia) Melbourne Performance Centre | Audi R8 LMS Evo | Audi DAR 5.2 L V10 | 24 | (Australia) Paul Stokell | T | 3–4 |
| (Australia) Melbourne Performance Centre | Audi R8 LMS Evo II | Audi DAR 5.2 L V10 | 88 | (New Zealand) Steve Brooks | PA | 1–2, 4–6 |
| (Australia) Melbourne Performance Centre | Audi R8 LMS Evo II | Audi DAR 5.2 L V10 | 88 | (New Zealand) Ryan Wood | PA | 1–2, 4–6 |
| (Australia) Melbourne Performance Centre | Audi R8 LMS Evo II | Audi DAR 5.2 L V10 | 181 | (Australia) Renee Gracie | Am | 1–5 |
| (Australia) Melbourne Performance Centre | Audi R8 LMS Evo II | Audi DAR 5.2 L V10 | 181 | (Australia) Renee Gracie | PA | 6 |
| (Australia) Melbourne Performance Centre | Audi R8 LMS Evo II | Audi DAR 5.2 L V10 | 181 | (New Zealand) Damon Leitch | PA | 6 |
| (Australia) Melbourne Performance Centre | Audi R8 LMS Evo II | Audi DAR 5.2 L V10 | 888 | (Australia) Broc Feeney | PA | All |
| (Australia) Melbourne Performance Centre | Audi R8 LMS Evo II | Audi DAR 5.2 L V10 | 888 | (Australia) Brad Schumacher | PA | All |
| (Australia) Black Wolf Motorsport | Mercedes-AMG GT3 Evo | Mercedes-AMG M159 6.2 L V8 | 16 | (Australia) Ben Schoots | Am | 1–2, 4–6 |
| (Australia) Black Wolf Motorsport | Mercedes-AMG GT3 Evo | Mercedes-AMG M159 6.2 L V8 | 16 | (Australia) Shane Woodman | Am | 1–2, 4–6 |
| (Australia) Zagame Autosport | Ferrari 296 GT3 | Ferrari F163CE 3.0 L Turbo V6 | 23 | (Australia) Josh Buchan | PA | 6 |
| (Australia) Zagame Autosport | Ferrari 296 GT3 | Ferrari F163CE 3.0 L Turbo V6 | 23 | (Australia) Cameron Campbell | PA | 6 |
| (Australia) Arise Racing GT | Ferrari 296 GT3 | Ferrari F163CE 3.0 L Turbo V6 | 26 | (New Zealand) Jaxon Evans | PA | All |
| (Australia) Arise Racing GT | Ferrari 296 GT3 | Ferrari F163CE 3.0 L Turbo V6 | 26 | (Australia) Elliott Schutte | PA | All |
| (Australia) Arise Racing GT | Ferrari 296 GT3 | Ferrari F163CE 3.0 L Turbo V6 | 77 | (Australia) Steve Wyatt | PA | All |
| (Australia) Arise Racing GT | Ferrari 296 GT3 | Ferrari F163CE 3.0 L Turbo V6 | 77 | (Australia) Jordan Love | PA | 1–2, 4–6 |
| (Australia) Arise Racing GT | Ferrari 296 GT3 | Ferrari F163CE 3.0 L Turbo V6 | 77 | (Australia) Aaron Love | PA | 3 |
| (New Zealand) International Motorsport | Audi R8 LMS Evo II | Audi DAR 5.2 L V10 | 27 | (New Zealand) Samuel Fillmore | PA | 6 |
| (New Zealand) International Motorsport | Audi R8 LMS Evo II | Audi DAR 5.2 L V10 | 27 | (New Zealand) Jonny Reid | PA | 6 |
| (Australia) Tigani Motorsport (Note: Cars No. 44 and 55 entered as Geyer Valmont Racing, No. 47 as Supabarn Supermarkets, No. 66 as Realta, and No. 71 as AED Consulting.) | Mercedes-AMG GT3 Evo | Mercedes-AMG M159 6.2 L V8 | 44 | (Australia) Thomas Randle | PA | 2 |
| (Australia) Tigani Motorsport | Mercedes-AMG GT3 Evo | Mercedes-AMG M159 6.2 L V8 | 44 | (Australia) Marcel Zalloua | PA | 2 |
| (Australia) Tigani Motorsport | Audi R8 LMS Evo II | Audi DAR 5.2 L V10 | 47 | (Australia) James Koundouris | Am | 1–2 |
| (Australia) Tigani Motorsport | Audi R8 LMS Evo II | Audi DAR 5.2 L V10 | 47 | (Australia) Theo Koundouris | Am | 1–2 |
| (Australia) Tigani Motorsport | Mercedes-AMG GT3 Evo | Mercedes-AMG M159 6.2 L V8 | 47 | (Australia) James Koundouris | Am | 3–5 |
| (Australia) Tigani Motorsport | Mercedes-AMG GT3 Evo | Mercedes-AMG M159 6.2 L V8 | 47 | (Australia) Theo Koundouris | Am | 3–5 |
| (Australia) Tigani Motorsport | Mercedes-AMG GT3 Evo | Mercedes-AMG M159 6.2 L V8 | 55 | (United Kingdom) George King | PA | All |
| (Australia) Tigani Motorsport | Mercedes-AMG GT3 Evo | Mercedes-AMG M159 6.2 L V8 | 55 | (Australia) Sergio Pires | PA | 1–4 |
| (Australia) Tigani Motorsport | Mercedes-AMG GT3 Evo | Mercedes-AMG M159 6.2 L V8 | 55 | (Australia) Marcel Zalloua | PA | 5–6 |
| (Australia) Tigani Motorsport | Mercedes-AMG GT3 Evo | Mercedes-AMG M159 6.2 L V8 | 66 | (Australia) Paul Lucchitti | PA | All |
| (Australia) Tigani Motorsport | Mercedes-AMG GT3 Evo | Mercedes-AMG M159 6.2 L V8 | 66 | (Australia) Jayden Ojeda | PA | All |
| (Australia) Tigani Motorsport | Porsche 911 GT3 R (991) | Porsche M97/80 4.0 L Flat 6 | 71 | (Australia) Nathan Halstead | T | 3 |
| (Australia) Tigani Motorsport | Porsche 911 GT3 R (991) | Porsche M97/80 4.0 L Flat 6 | 71 | (Australia) Luke Youlden | T | 3 |
| (Australia) Wall Racing | Lamborghini Huracán GT3 Evo 2 | Lamborghini DGF 5.2 L V10 | 93 | (Australia) Adrian Deitz | PA | 1–3, 5–6 |
| (Australia) Wall Racing | Lamborghini Huracán GT3 Evo 2 | Lamborghini DGF 5.2 L V10 | 93 | (Australia) Tony D'Alberto | PA | 1–2, 5–6 |
| (Australia) Wall Racing | Lamborghini Huracán GT3 Evo 2 | Lamborghini DGF 5.2 L V10 | 93 | (Australia) David Wall | PA | 3 |
| (New Zealand) Mach 1 Engineering | Mercedes-AMG GT3 Evo | Mercedes-AMG M159 6.2 L V8 | 96 | (New Zealand) Ant Pedersen | PA | 1, 6 |
| (New Zealand) Mach 1 Engineering | Mercedes-AMG GT3 Evo | Mercedes-AMG M159 6.2 L V8 | 96 | (New Zealand) Paul Pedersen | PA | 1 |
| (New Zealand) Mach 1 Engineering | Mercedes-AMG GT3 Evo | Mercedes-AMG M159 6.2 L V8 | 96 | (Australia) Shane Smollen | PA | 6 |
| (Australia) 111 Racing | Mercedes-AMG GT3 Evo | Mercedes-AMG M159 6.2 L V8 | 111 | (Australia) Grant Donaldson | Am | 1, 3–6 |
| (Australia) 111 Racing | Mercedes-AMG GT3 Evo | Mercedes-AMG M159 6.2 L V8 | 111 | (Australia) Darren Currie | Am | 1, 3–4, 6 |
| (Australia) Team BRM | Audi R8 LMS Evo II | Audi DAR 5.2 L V10 | 268 | (Australia) Alex Peroni | PA | 1–5 |
| (Australia) Team BRM | Audi R8 LMS Evo II | Audi DAR 5.2 L V10 | 268 | (Australia) Mark Rosser | PA | 1–5 |
| (Australia) EMA Motorsport | Porsche 911 GT3 R (992) | Porsche M97/80 4.2 L Flat-6 | 911 | (France) Dorian Boccolacci | PA | 1 |
| (Australia) EMA Motorsport | Porsche 911 GT3 R (992) | Porsche M97/80 4.2 L Flat-6 | 911 | (Australia) Shane Smollen | PA | 1 |

| Icon | Class |
|---|---|
| PA | Pro-Am Cup |
| Am | Am Cup |
| T | Trophy Cup |

== Race results ==
Bold indicates the overall winner.

| Round | | Circuit | Pole position | Pro-Am winners | Am winners | Trophy winners |
|---|---|---|---|---|---|---|
| 1 | R1 | (Victoria (state)) Phillip Island | (Australia) No. 26 Arise Racing GT | **(Australia) No. 26 Arise Racing GT** | (Australia) No. 16 Black Wolf Motorsport | No entries |
| 1 | R1 | (Victoria (state)) Phillip Island | (New Zealand) Jaxon Evans (Australia) Elliott Schutte | **(New Zealand) Jaxon Evans** **(Australia) Elliott Schutte** | (Australia) Ben Schoots (Australia) Shane Woodman | No entries |
| 1 | R2 | (Victoria (state)) Phillip Island | (Australia) No. 911 EMA Motorsport | (Australia) **No. 888 Melbourne Performance Centre** | (Australia) No. 181 Melbourne Performance Centre | No entries |
| 1 | R2 | (Victoria (state)) Phillip Island | (France) Dorian Boccolacci (Australia) Shane Smollen | **(Australia) Broc Feeney** **(Australia) Brad Schumacher** | (Australia) Renee Gracie | No entries |
| 2 | R1 | (New South Wales) Eastern Creek | (Australia) No. 26 Arise Racing GT | **(Australia) No. 26 Arise Racing GT** | (Australia) No. 181 Melbourne Performance Centre | No finishers |
| 2 | R1 | (New South Wales) Eastern Creek | (New Zealand) Jaxon Evans (Australia) Elliott Schutte | **(New Zealand) Jaxon Evans** **(Australia) Elliott Schutte** | (Australia) Renee Gracie | No finishers |
| 2 | R2 | (New South Wales) Eastern Creek | (Australia) No. 26 Arise Racing GT | **(Australia) No. 26 Arise Racing GT** | (Australia) No. 181 Melbourne Performance Centre | (Australia) No. 24 Melbourne Performance Centre |
| 2 | R2 | (New South Wales) Eastern Creek | (New Zealand) Jaxon Evans (Australia) Elliott Schutte | **(New Zealand) Jaxon Evans** **(Australia) Elliott Schutte** | (Australia) Renee Gracie | (Australia) Gary Higgon (Australia) Matt Stoupas |
| 3 | R1 | Queensland | (Australia) No. 888 Melbourne Performance Centre | (Australia) **No. 888 Melbourne Performance Centre** | (Australia) No. 181 Melbourne Performance Centre | (Australia) No. 24 Melbourne Performance Centre |
| 3 | R1 | Queensland | **(Australia)** Broc Feeney (Australia) Brad Schumacher | **(Australia) Broc Feeney** **(Australia) Brad Schumacher** | (Australia) Renee Gracie | (Australia) Gary Higgon (Australia) Paul Stokell |
| 3 | R2 | Queensland | (Australia) No. 888 Melbourne Performance Centre | (Australia) **No. 268 Team BRM** | (Australia) No. 181 Melbourne Performance Centre | (Australia) No. 24 Melbourne Performance Centre |
| 3 | R2 | Queensland | **(Australia)** Broc Feeney (Australia) Brad Schumacher | (Australia) **Alex Peroni** **(Australia) Mark Rosser** | (Australia) Renee Gracie | (Australia) Gary Higgon (Australia) Paul Stokell |
| 4 | R1 | (Victoria (state)) Sandown | (Australia) No. 26 Arise Racing GT | **(Australia) No. 26 Arise Racing GT** | (Australia) No. 16 Black Wolf Motorsport | (Australia) No. 24 Melbourne Performance Centre |
| 4 | R1 | (Victoria (state)) Sandown | (New Zealand) Jaxon Evans (Australia) Elliott Schutte | **(New Zealand) Jaxon Evans** **(Australia) Elliott Schutte** | (Australia) Ben Schoots (Australia) Shane Woodman | (Australia) Paul Stokell (Australia) Matt Stoupas |
| 4 | R2 | (Victoria (state)) Sandown | (Australia) No. 77 Arise Racing GT | **(Australia) No. 1 Volante Rosso Motorsport** | (Australia) No. 181 Melbourne Performance Centre | (Australia) No. 24 Melbourne Performance Centre |
| 4 | R2 | (Victoria (state)) Sandown | (Australia) Jordan Love (Australia) Steve Wyatt | **(United Arab Emirates) Jamie Day** **(Australia) Liam Talbot** | (Australia) Renee Gracie | (Australia) Paul Stokell (Australia) Matt Stoupas |
| 5 | R1 | (South Australia) The Bend | (Australia) No.1 Volante Rosso Motorsport | (Australia) **No. 268 Team BRM** | (Australia) No. 47 Tigani Motorsport | (Australia) No. 24 Melbourne Performance Centre |
| 5 | R1 | (South Australia) The Bend | (United Arab Emirates) Jamie Day (Australia) Liam Talbot | (Australia) **Alex Peroni** **(Australia) Mark Rosser** | (Australia) James Koundouris (Australia) Theo Koundouris | (Australia) Gary Higgon (Australia) Matt Stoupas |
| 5 | R2 | (South Australia) The Bend | (Australia) No.66 Tigani Motorsport | (Australia) **No.66 Tigani Motorsport** | (Australia) No. 181 Melbourne Performance Centre | (Australia) No. 24 Melbourne Performance Centre |
| 5 | R2 | (South Australia) The Bend | (Australia) Jayden Ojeda (Australia) Paul Lucchitti | (Australia) **Jayden Ojeda** **(Australia) Paul Lucchitti** | (Australia) Renee Gracie | (Australia) Gary Higgon (Australia) Matt Stoupas |
| 6 | R1 | (New Zealand) Hampton Downs | (Australia) No. 888 Melbourne Performance Centre | (Australia) **No. 888 Melbourne Performance Centre** | (Australia) No. 111 111 Racing | No entries |
| 6 | R1 | (New Zealand) Hampton Downs | (Australia) Broc Feeney (Australia) Brad Schumacher | **(Australia) Broc Feeney** **(Australia) Brad Schumacher** | (Australia) Grant Donaldson (Australia) Darren Currie | No entries |
| 6 | R2 | (New Zealand) Hampton Downs | (Australia) No. 888 Melbourne Performance Centre | **(Australia) No. 888 Melbourne Performance Centre** | (Australia) No. 111 111 Racing | No entries |
| 6 | R2 | (New Zealand) Hampton Downs | (Australia) Broc Feeney (Australia) Brad Schumacher | **(Australia) Broc Feeney** **(Australia) Brad Schumacher** | (Australia) Grant Donaldson (Australia) Darren Currie | No entries |

== Championship standings ==
Scoring system

| Position | **1st** | **2nd** | **3rd** | **4th** | **5th** | **6th** | **7th** | **8th** | **9th** | **10th** | **Pole** |
| Points | 25 | 18 | 15 | 12 | 10 | 8 | 6 | 4 | 2 | 1 | 1 |

=== Pro-Am Cup ===
| Pos | Driver | Team | PHI (Victoria (state)) | | SYD (New South Wales) | | QLD (Queensland) | | SAN (Victoria (state)) | | BEN (South Australia) | | HAM (New Zealand) | | Points |
|---|---|---|---|---|---|---|---|---|---|---|---|---|---|---|---|
| 1 | (Australia) Broc Feeney (Australia) Brad Schumacher | (Australia) Melbourne Performance Centre | 9 | 1 | 4 | 3 | **1** | **3** | 3 | 2 | 3 | 3 | **1** | **1** | 211 |
| 2 | (New Zealand) Jaxon Evans (Australia) Elliott Schutte | (Australia) Arise Racing GT | **1** | 3 | **1** | **1** | 3 | 5 | **1** | 3 | 2 | 4 | 4 | 7 | 207 |
| 3 | (Australia) Paul Lucchitti (Australia) Jayden Ojeda | (Australia) Tigani Motorsport | 2 | 9 | 3 | 4 | 2 | 7 | 4 | 4 | 5 | **1** | 8 | 3 | 154 |
| 4 | (New Zealand) Steve Brooks (New Zealand) Ryan Wood | (Australia) Melbourne Performance Centre | 11 | 6 | 6 | 2 | | | 2 | 6 | 4 | 2 | 3 | 2 | 123 |
| 5 | (Australia) Liam Talbot | (Australia) Volante Rosso Motorsport | 5 | 2 | 10 | 7 | 4 | 9 | 8 | 1 | **8** | 6 | 2 | 4 | 117 |
| 6 | (United Kingdom) George King | (Australia) Tigani Motorsport | 8 | 4 | 5 | 6 | 6 | 6 | 5 | 8 | 6 | 5 | 11 | Ret | 86 |
| 7 | (Australia) Steve Wyatt | (Australia) Arise Racing GT | 6 | 8 | 8 | 10 | 5 | 4 | 6 | **7** | 7 | 7 | 9 | 6 | 80 |
| 8 | (Australia) Alex Peroni (Australia) Mark Rosser | (Australia) Team BRM | 7 | Ret | 7 | 8 | Ret | 1 | 9 | 5 | 1 | Ret | | | 78 |
| 9 | (Australia) Sergio Pires | (Australia) Tigani Motorsport | 8 | 4 | 5 | 6 | 6 | 6 | 5 | 8 | | | | | 64 |
| 10 | (Australia) Jordan Love | (Australia) Arise Racing GT | 6 | 8 | 8 | 10 | | | 6 | **7** | 7 | 7 | 9 | 6 | 58 |
| 11 | (New Zealand) Brendon Leitch (New Zealand) Tim Miles | (Australia) Melbourne Performance Centre | 3 | 5 | 11 | 5 | Ret | 2 | | | | | | | 53 |
| 12 | (Australia) Declan Fraser | (Australia) Volante Rosso Motorsport | 5 | 2 | 10 | 7 | 4 | 9 | | | | | | | 49 |
| 13 | (Australia) Marcel Zalloua | (Australia) Tigani Motorsport | | | 2 | 9 | | | | | 6 | 5 | 11 | Ret | 42 |
| 14 | (United Arab Emirates) Jamie Day | (Australia) Volante Rosso Motorsport | | | | | | | 8 | 1 | **8** | 6 | | | 38 |
| 15 | (Australia) Shane Smollen | (Australia) EMA Motorsport | 4 | **10** | | | | | | | | | | | 33 |
| 15 | (Australia) Shane Smollen | (New Zealand) Mach 1 Engineering | | | | | | | | | | | 7 | 5 | 33 |
| 16 | (Australia) Josh Hunt | (Australia) Volante Rosso Motorsport | | | | | | | | | | | 2 | 4 | 30 |
| 17 | (Australia) Adrian Deitz | (Australia) Wall Racing | 10 | 10 | 9 | 11 | 7 | 8 | | | 9 | 8 | 12 | 9 | 28 |
| 18 | (New Zealand) Ant Pedersen | (New Zealand) Mach 1 Engineering | Ret | 7 | | | | | | | | | 7 | 5 | 26 |
| 19 | (Australia) Aaron Love | (Australia) Arise Racing GT | | | | | 5 | 4 | | | | | | | 22 |
| 20 | (Australia) Thomas Randle | (Australia) Tigani Motorsport | | | 2 | 9 | | | | | | | | | 20 |
| 21 | (Australia) Tony D'Alberto | (Australia) Wall Racing | 10 | 10 | 9 | 11 | | | | | 9 | 8 | 12 | 9 | 18 |
| 22 | (France) Dorian Boccolacci | (Australia) EMA Motorsport | 4 | **10** | | | | | | | | | | | 13 |
| 23 | (Australia) David Wall | (Australia) Wall Racing | | | | | 7 | 8 | | | | | | | 10 |
| 24 | (Australia) Marc Cini (Australia) Lee Holdsworth | (Australia) Melbourne Performance Centre | | | | | | | 7 | 9 | | | | | 8 |
| 25 | (New Zealand) Paul Pedersen | (New Zealand) Mach 1 Engineering | Ret | 7 | | | | | | | | | | | 6 |
Entries ineligible to score points
| — | (Australia) Renee Gracie (New Zealand) Damon Leitch | (Australia) Melbourne Performance Centre | | | | | | | | | | | 5 | Ret | 0 |
| — | (New Zealand) Samuel Fillmore (New Zealand) Jonny Reid | (New Zealand) International Motorsport | | | | | | | | | | | 6 | Ret | 0 |
| — | (Australia) Josh Buchan (Australia) Cameron Campbell | (Australia) Zagame Autosport | | | | | | | | | | | 10 | 8 | 0 |
| Pos | Driver | Team | PHI (Victoria (state)) | | SYD (New South Wales) | | QLD (Queensland) | | SAN (Victoria (state)) | | BEN (South Australia) | | HAM (New Zealand) | | Points |

| Colour | Result |
|---|---|
| Gold | Winner |
| Silver | Second place |
| Bronze | Third place |
| Green | Points classification |
| Blue | Non-points classification |
| Blue | Non-classified finish (NC) |
| Purple | Retired, not classified (Ret) |
| Red | Did not qualify (DNQ) |
| Red | Did not pre-qualify (DNPQ) |
| Black | Disqualified (DSQ) |
| White | Did not start (DNS) |
| White | Withdrew (WD) |
| White | Race cancelled (C) |
| Blank | Did not practice (DNP) |
| Blank | Did not arrive (DNA) |
| Blank | Excluded (EX) |

**Bold** – Pole

Italics – Fastest Lap

=== Am Cup ===
| Pos | Driver | Team | PHI (Victoria (state)) | | SYD (New South Wales) | | QLD (Queensland) | | SAN (Victoria (state)) | | BEN (South Australia) | | HAM (New Zealand) | | Points |
|---|---|---|---|---|---|---|---|---|---|---|---|---|---|---|---|
| 1 | (Australia) Renee Gracie | (Australia) Melbourne Performance Centre | **2** | 1 | **1** | **1** | **1** | **1** | 2 | 1 | **2** | **1** | | | 236 |
| 2 | (Australia) Ben Schoots (Australia) Shane Woodman | (Australia) Black Wolf Motorsport | 1 | **2** | 2 | 3 | | | 1 | 3 | 3 | 2 | 2 | 2 | 186 |
| 3 | (Australia) James Koundouris (Australia) Theo Koundouris | (Australia) Tigani Motorsport | 3 | 3 | 3 | 2 | 3 | 2 | 3 | Ret | 1 | 3 | | | 151 |
| 4 | (Australia) Grant Donaldson | (Australia) 111 Racing | WD | WD | | | 2 | 3 | **4** | **2** | 4 | 4 | **1** | **1** | 139 |
| 5 | (Australia) Darren Currie | (Australia) 111 Racing | WD | WD | | | 2 | 3 | **4** | **2** | | | **1** | **1** | 115 |
| Pos | Driver | Team | PHI (Victoria (state)) | | SYD (New South Wales) | | QLD (Queensland) | | SAN (Victoria (state)) | | BEN (South Australia) | | HAM (New Zealand) | | Points |

=== Trophy Cup ===
| Pos | Driver | Team | PHI (Victoria (state)) | SYD (New South Wales) | | QLD (Queensland) | | SAN (Victoria (state)) | | BEN (South Australia) | | HAM (New Zealand) | Points |
|---|---|---|---|---|---|---|---|---|---|---|---|---|---|
| 1 | (Australia) Matt Stoupas | (Australia) Melbourne Performance Centre | | **DNS** | **1** | | | **1** | **1** | **1** | **1** | | 130 |
| 2 | (Australia) Gary Higgon | (Australia) Melbourne Performance Centre | | **DNS** | **1** | **1** | **1** | | | **1** | **1** | | 130 |
| 3 | (Australia) Paul Stokell | (Australia) Melbourne Performance Centre | | | | **1** | **1** | **1** | **1** | | | | 104 |
| 4 | (Australia) Nathan Halstead (Australia) Luke Youlden | (Australia) Tigani Motorsport | | | | 2 | Ret | | | | | | 18 |
| Pos | Driver | Team | PHI (Victoria (state)) | SYD (New South Wales) | | QLD (Queensland) | | SAN (Victoria (state)) | | BEN (South Australia) | | HAM (New Zealand) | Points |

=== Teams' Championship ===
Only Pro-Am class cars are eligible to score points towards the teams championship

| Pos | Team | PHI (Victoria (state)) | | SYD (New South Wales) | | QLD (Queensland) | | SAN (Victoria (state)) | | BEN (South Australia) | | HAM (New Zealand) | | Points |
|---|---|---|---|---|---|---|---|---|---|---|---|---|---|---|
| 1 | (Australia) Melbourne Performance Centre | 3 | 1 | 3 | 2 | **1** | **2** | 2 | 2 | 3 | 2 | 1 | 1 | 237 |
| 1 | (Australia) Arise Racing GT | **1** | 3 | **1** | **1** | 3 | 3 | **1** | **3** | 2 | 3 | 3 | 2 | 231 |
| 3 | (Australia) Tigani Motorsport | 2 | 4 | 2 | 3 | 2 | 4 | 3 | 4 | 4 | **1** | 6 | 3 | 183 |
| 4 | (Australia) Volante Rosso Motorsport | 5 | 2 | 6 | 4 | 4 | 6 | 4 | 1 | 5 | 4 | 2 | 4 | 158 |
| 5 | (Australia) Team BRM | 6 | Ret | 4 | 5 | Ret | 1 | 5 | 5 | 1 | Ret | | | 104 |
| 6 | (Australia) Wall Racing | 7 | 6 | 5 | 6 | 5 | 5 | | | 6 | 5 | 8 | 7 | 86 |
| 7 | (New Zealand) Mach 1 Engineering | Ret | 5 | | | | | | | | | 5 | 5 | 32 |
| 8 | (Australia) EMA Motorsport | 4 | **7** | | | | | | | | | | | 19 |
Entries ineligible to score points
| — | (New Zealand) International Motorsport | | | | | | | | | | | 4 | Ret | 0 |
| — | (Australia) Zagame Autosport | | | | | | | | | | | 7 | 6 | 0 |
| Pos | Team | PHI (Victoria (state)) | | SYD (New South Wales) | | QLD (Queensland) | | SAN (Victoria (state)) | | BEN (South Australia) | | HAM (New Zealand) | | Points |

== See also ==
- 2025 GT World Challenge Europe
- 2025 GT World Challenge Europe Endurance Cup
- 2025 GT World Challenge Europe Sprint Cup
- 2025 GT World Challenge Asia
- 2025 GT World Challenge America
- 2025 Intercontinental GT Challenge
- 2025 British GT Championship
