= Mark Dutton =

Australian motor racing engineer

Personal information
- Nationality: Australian

Sport
- Country: Australia
- Sport: Supercars
- Team: Larkham Motorsport; Briggs Motorsport; Triple Eight Race Engineering

Mark Dutton is an Australian motor racing engineer and current team manager of Triple Eight Race Engineering. He has engineered Jamie Whincup to five Supercars series championships. In 2014, he became team manager of Triple Eight.

== Career ==
After studying a mechanical engineering degree at the Queensland University of Technology, Mark Dutton became a race engineer at Larkham Motorsport in 2001.

After Larkham Motorsport, Dutton went to Briggs Motorsport after a break from the sport. In 2007, he became the lead engineer of the Triple Eight Falcon driven by Jamie Whincup. That year, Whincup finished second in the championship behind Garth Tander. Dutton then engineered Whincup to five series championships in 2008, 2009, 2011, 2012 and 2013.

In 2014, Dutton was promoted to team manager of Triple Eight Race Engineering under team principal and co-founder Roland Dane.
