= Peter Hackett (racing driver) =

Australian racing driver (born 1977)

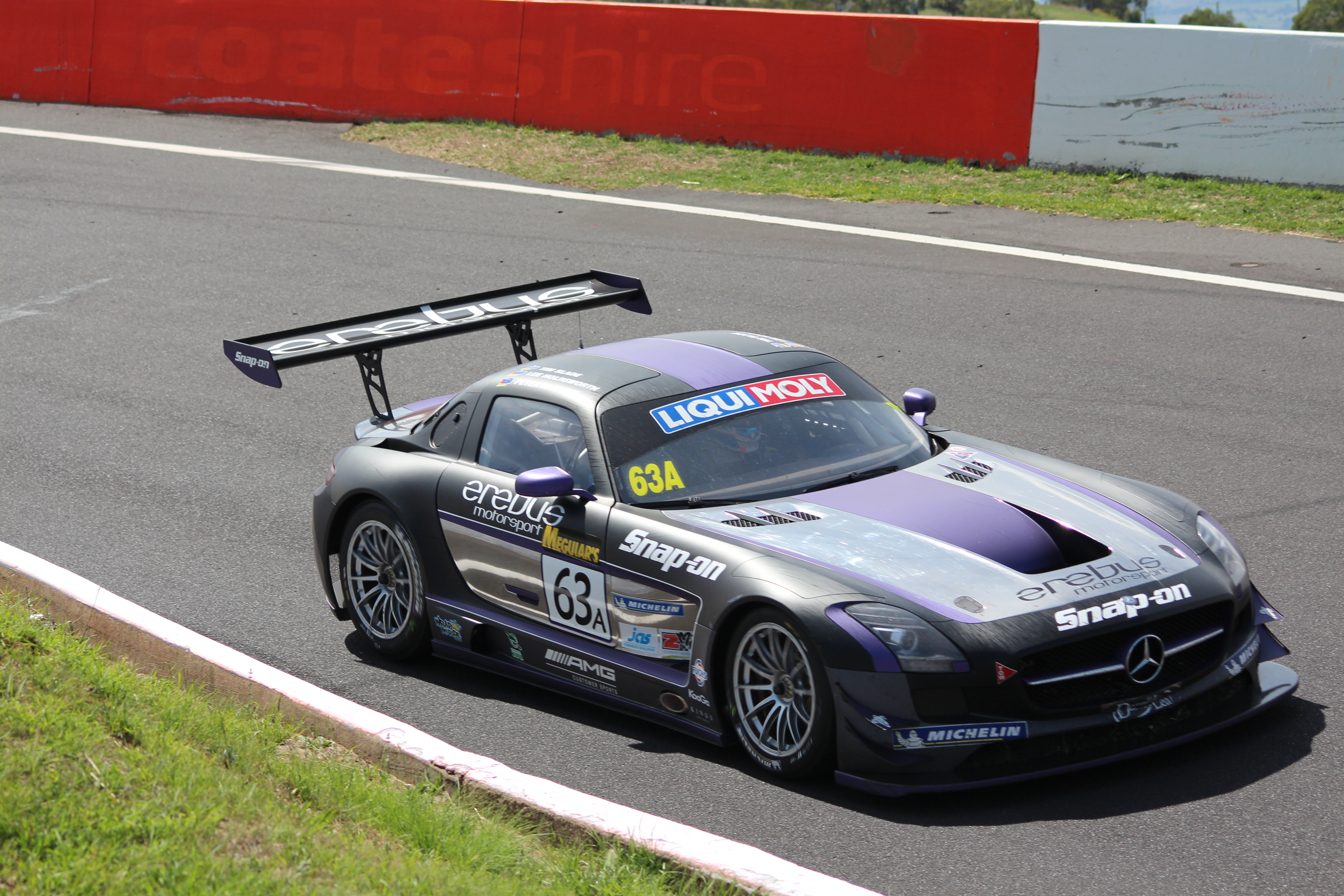
- Hackett at the 2013 Bathurst 12 Hour
- Nationality: Australian
- Born: 17 September 1972 (age 54) Sydney, New South Wales
- Debut season: 2000
- Current team: Eggleston Motorsport
- Categorisation: FIA Gold (until 2013); FIA Silver (2014–2022); FIA Bronze (2023–)
- Teams: Eggleston Motorsport; Erebus Motorsport; Aston Martin Racing; Ralt; Melbourne Performance Centre; Team Lamborghini Australia; Piccola Scuderia; Aircon Racing, Race Torque; Mark Coffey Racing; Greg Murphy Racing; Piccolo Scuderia Corse; Carlin Motorsport
- Starts: 178
- Wins: 46
- Poles: 19
- Fastest laps: 33

Previous series
- 2000-2008 2010-2019 2016-2017: Australian GT Production; Australian GT C/ship; Australian Endurance Championship

Championship titles
- 2001 2005 2012 2017: Australian Formula 3 Formula 4000; Australian Tourist Trophy; Australian Endurance Championship

Peter James Hackett (born 17 September 1972) is an Australian Endurance Championship GT race driver and driving instructor. He was born in Sydney, resides in Melbourne and has competed in varying Australian motor racing categories since 2000, but has particularly focused on the Australian Endurance Championship in recent years.

After his win at the 2017 Hampton Downs Motorsport Park event, Hackett joined David Wall and the late Allan Simonsen as the most successful drivers in Australian GT history, with 17 victories to their names.

== Early years ==
Hackett's first forays into motor racing were not in his home country of Australia, but rather the United Kingdom. From 1995 to 1997, he raced in various categories including British Formula Vauxhall Junior and British Formula Ford Championship. These early years did not yield any major successes, and Hackett returned home to Australia in the late 90s. His return to Australia in 2000 saw him compete in Australian Formula 3 and Australian Formula 2 followed by a full season of Formula 3 in 2001 which resulted in Hackett's first Championship victory.

In 2002, Hackett divided his time between Australian Formula 3 and Formula Holden, scoring one win and sixth overall in Formula 3 (competing in eight of 16 races), while finishing seventh in Formula Holden (Competing in six of 12 races)

== Australian GT Racing ==
The CAMS sanctioned Australian GT series and the Australian Endurance Championship became Hackett's preferred racing categories and the place where he made his mark.

In 2016, Hackett and teammate Dominic Storey in an Eggleston Motorsport prepared Mercedes-AMG GT3 was second in the CAMS Australian Endurance Championship to Tekno Autosports Grant Denyer and Nathan Morcom.

In 2017, Hackett went one better, winning the CAMS Australian Endurance Championship again alongside teammate and co-driver Dominic Storey.

== Driving Instructor ==
Since 2001, Hackett has served Mercedes-Benz AMG Australasia as its Chief Driving Instructor for performance drive days and track days.

As well as his driving instructor duties, Hackett is also an MC for Mercedes Benz vehicle launches, press launches and special events and has been the featured stunt driver in multiple Mercedes Benz/AMG television advertisements and web clips.

== Career summary ==
Season	Series	Team	Wins	Podiums	Points	Position
1997	British Formula Ford Winter Series	unknown	?	?	?	3rd
2000	Australian Formula 3	Piccola Scuderia Corse	3	6	131	2nd
2001	Australian Formula 3	Piccola Scuderia Corse	8	12	238	1st
2001	Macau Grand Prix	Carlin Motorsport	0	0	-	7th
2002	Australian Formula 3	Piccola Scuderia Corse	1	4	86	6th
2003	Australian Formula 3	Aircon Racing	0	1	105	5th
2004	Australian Formula 3	Piccola Scuderia Corse	0	2	43	9th
2004	Australian Nations Cup Championship	Team Lamborghini Australia	0	1	38	10th
2005	Australian Formula 4000	Ralt Australia	9	10	201	1st
2005	Australian GT Championship	Team Lamborghini Australia	10	11	414	2nd
2006	Australian GT Championship	Team Lamborghini Australia	1	1	91.5	26th
2007	Australian GT Championship	Team Lamborghini Australia	0	1	-	NC
2008	Australian GT Championship	Team Aston Martin	0	1	82	23rd
2010	Australian GT Championship	Consolidated Chemical	0	5	397	5th
2010	Australian Tourist Trophy	Consolidated Chemical	0	2	195	2nd
2011	Australian GT Championship	Erebus Motorsport	2	8	570	4th
2011	Australian Tourist Trophy	Erebus Motorsport	1	3	160	4th
2012	Australian GT Championship	Erebus Motorsport	3	9	173	2nd
2012	Australian Tourist Trophy	Erebus Motorsport	0	3	-	1st
2013	Australian GT Championship	Erebus Motorsport	0	0	26	27th
2016	Australian Endurance Championship	Erebus Motorsport	0	1	434	2nd
2017	Australian Endurance Championship	Eggleston Motorsport	1	2	660	1st
2018	Australian GT Championship	Eggleston Motorsport	2	7	1041	3rd
2019	Australian GT Championship	Eggleston Motorsport	4	10	1438	2nd
2021	Australian GT Championship - Pro/Am	Triple Eight Race Engineering	0	1	15	16th
2022	GT World Challenge Australia - Pro/Am	Harrolds Racing	0	0	20	14th
2024	GT World Challenge Australia - Pro/Am	Triple Eight Race Engineering	1	4	121	4th
2026	TSS The Super Series - GT3	Racing Aurora				

=== Complete Macau Grand Prix results ===
Year	Team	Car	Qualifying	Quali Race	Main race
2001	(United Kingdom) Carlin Motorsport	Dallara F399- Mugen-Honda	28th	27th	7th

=== Complete Bathurst 24 Hour results ===
Year	Team	Co-drivers	Car	Class	Laps	Overall position	Class position
2003	(Australia) Mark Coffey Racing	(Australia) Paul Stokell (Denmark) Allan Simonsen (Australia) Luke Youlden	Lamborghini Diablo GTR	A	487	8th	6th

=== Complete Bathurst 12 Hour results ===
Year	Team	Co-drivers	Car	Class	Laps	Pos.	Class pos.
2012	(Australia) Erebus Racing	(Netherlands) Jeroen Bleekemolen (Australia) Tim Slade (United States) Bret Curtis	Mercedes-Benz SLS AMG	A	270	2nd	2nd
2013	(Australia) Erebus Racing	(Australia) Lee Holdsworth (Australia) Tim Slade	Mercedes-Benz SLS AMG	A	263	6th	6th

== Controversy ==
Upon his return to Australian GT Championship in 2016 in Adelaide, Hackett was sensationally excluded from the event after an incident at turn nine where Hackett hit the Audi R8 of James Koundouris. Hackett was excluded after he was found to have breached championship rules 183 section 9 that states ‘any action which causes or is likely to cause damage to other persons or property’. Hackett admitted fault and accepted the CAMS fine of $10,000 with a further $10,000 suspended for the incident.

Sporting positions
Preceded by Paul Stephenson	Winner of the Australian Formula 3 Championship; 2001	Succeeded by James Manderson
Preceded by Neil McFayden	Winner of the Australian F4000; 2005	Succeeded by Derek Pingel
Preceded by Mark Eddy	Winner of the Australian Tourist Trophy; 2012	Succeeded by Richard Muscat
Preceded by Grant Denyer; Nathan Morcom	Winner of the Australian Endurance Championship; 2017 with Dominic Storey	Succeeded by Max Twigg; Tony D'Alberto
