= 2001 Macau Grand Prix =

Formula Three motor race

Race details
Date	18 November 2001
Location	Guia Circuit, Macau
Course	Temporary street circuit 6.120 km (3.803 mi)
Distance	30 laps, 165.27 km (102.69 mi)
- First leg

Pole
Driver	(Sweden) Björn Wirdheim	Prema Powerteam
Time	2:11.983

Fastest Lap
Driver	(Italy) Paolo Montin	TOM'S
Time	2:13.263

Podium
First	(Japan) Takuma Sato	Carlin
Second	(Sweden) Björn Wirdheim	Prema Powerteam
Third	(Italy) Paolo Montin	TOM'S
- Second leg
Driver	(Japan) Takuma Sato	Carlin

Fastest Lap
Driver	(United Kingdom) Derek Hayes	Derek Hayes
Time	2:12.921

Podium
First	(Japan) Takuma Sato	Carlin
Second	(France) Benoît Tréluyer	Mugen x Dome Project
Third	(Sweden) Björn Wirdheim	Prema Powerteam

The 2001 Macau Grand Prix (officially the 48th Macau Grand Prix) was a Formula Three (F3) motor race held on the streets of Macau on 18 November 2001. Unlike other races, such as the Masters of Formula 3, the 2001 Macau Grand Prix was not part of any F3 championship, but was open to entries from all F3 championships. The race was split into two 15-lap aggregate legs held in the morning and afternoon, with the overall winner being the driver who completed all 30 laps in the quickest time. The 2001 edition was the 48th Macau Grand Prix and the 19th for F3 cars.

Takuma Sato of Carlin Motorsport won the Grand Prix after starting second on the first leg. Sato overtook pole position starter Björn Wirdheim of Prema Powerteam at the start of the first leg and pulled away to win to start the second leg from first. He led every lap of the second leg to win the race outright on his second appearance, becoming the first Japanese driver to do so. Benoît Tréluyer of Mugen x Dome Project took second place and Wirdheim finished third overall.

== Background and entry list ==
The Macau Grand Prix is a Formula Three (F3) race that has been dubbed the territory's most prestigious international sporting event and a stepping stone to higher motorsport categories such as Formula One (F1). The 2001 Macau Grand Prix was the event's 48th edition and the 19th time it was held to F3 rules. It was held on the 6.2 km (3.9 mi) Guia Circuit on 18 November 2001, after three days of practice and qualifying. Following an accident during the warm-up session for the 2000 Guia Race of Macau in which driver Frans Verschuur's brakes failed, causing him to penetrate the Lisboa corner tyre wall and plough into a truck, killing a mainland Chinese tourist and injuring three others, race organisers installed two rows of steel barriers and improved safety by replacing its canvas and repairing the area's asphalt road surface.

Drivers had to compete in a Fédération Internationale de l'Automobile (FIA)-regulated championship race during the calendar year, in one of the seven national F3 championships that took place during the calendar year, with the top-placed drivers receiving priority to earn an invitation to the race. Each of the major F3 series champions were on the event's 30-car grid. British champion Takuma Sato, who had been signed to drive for Jordan Grand Prix in the 2002 Formula One World Championship in October 2001 and was the first contracted F1 driver to compete at the Macau Grand Prix since the 1985 race, was joined in Macau by German title holder Toshihiro Kaneishi, French series champion Ryō Fukuda, Japanese series winner Benoît Tréluyer and Australian champion Peter Hackett. The Macau Grand Prix Committee invited three Macanese drivers to compete: Jo Merszei, Michael Ho and Lei Kit Meng. British series driver Gianmaria Bruni elected to withdraw from the event and the Korea Super Prix because of a lack of car familiarisation time and instead tested an International Formula 3000 vehicle. Formula Renault 2.0 UK Championship driver Heikki Kovalainen replaced Bruni.

== Practice and qualifying ==
There were two one-hour practice sessions preceding the race on Sunday: one on Thursday morning and one on Friday morning. The first practice session was held on a dirty track due to debris left over from the Guia Race of Macau and in cool, cloudy weather. TOM'S Paolo Montin lapped fastest in the final minute at 2:14.510. He was nearly four-tenths of a second faster than Jonathan Cochet, who had front braking issues and was fastest until Montin's lap. Sato, Pierre Kaffer, Tiago Monteiro, Yuji Ide, Kaneishi, João Paulo de Oliveira, Kosuke Matsuura and Tréluyer completed the top ten. No major incidents were reported during the session although Mark Taylor and Kovalainen scraped the trackside barriers.

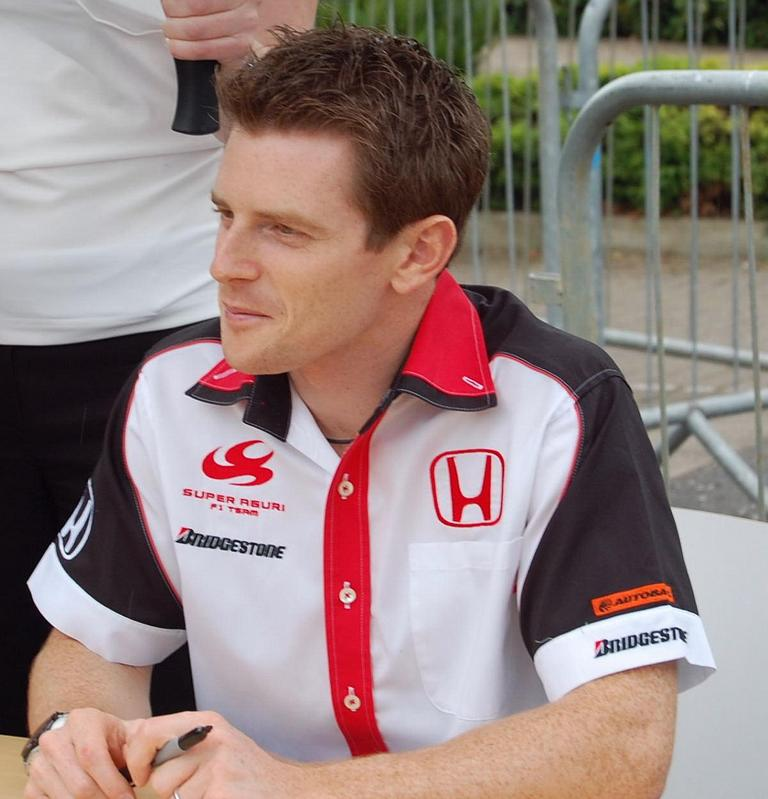
Anthony Davidson (pictured in 2007) had a heavy accident in the first qualifying session and was withdrawn on medical grounds.

Qualifying was divided into two 45-minute sessions, one on Thursday afternoon and one on Friday afternoon. Each driver's fastest time from either session was used to determine their starting position in Sunday's race. The first qualifying session took place on Thursday afternoon in warm weather with a strong sea breeze from Macau's coastline. Practice pace setter Montin contended from the start and took provisional pole position with a 2 minutes, 13.214 seconds lap with less than two minutes left. Sato, second, led for much of qualifying with Cochet third. Monteiro led early on but failed to lap faster and came fourth. Anthony Davidson was fifth after seeking to find a rhythm he liked. Sixth-placed Kaneshi took first from Monteiro until he fell back. Fukuka, seventh, did not push too hard. Early pace setter Andy Priaulx was eighth; Tréluyer and Matsurra completed the top ten. De Oliviera was the fastest driver not to reach the top ten despite a strong start. The final positions were Kaffer, Björn Wirdheim, Enrico Toccacelo, Derek Hayes, Marchy Lee, Kovalainen, Bruce Jouanny, Tristan Gommendy, Sakon Yamamoto, Peter Sundberg, Hackett, Ho, Haruki Kurosawa, Lei, Merszei, Matteo Bobbi and Taylor. Ide and Raffaele Giammaria set no laps.

Ide slid on his out-lap and hit the Mandarin Oriental Bend wall. He recovered but stopped in the Melco hairpin tyre barrier, causing a traffic jam that caught Giammaria off guard. This stopped qualifying to allow marshals to clear the wreckage. Davidson could not avoid striking Lei's stricken car and went airborne. His suspension wishbones were broken and his nose cone removed. Davidson limped to the pit lane for car repairs. Later, Kurosawa removed one of his car's wheels in an impact with a wall. Taylor and Bobbi collided and ended their session early as Yamamoto struck the trackside wall. With less than a minute left, Davidson lost rear vehicle traction at Matsuya bend and struck the barrier. He ricocheted sideways across the track and stopped broadside. An unsighted Montiero then rammed Davidson's car at low speed. Davidson prepared by moving his head forward and exited his car unaided. He complained of a sore neck and was taken to the local hospital by ambulance for a precautionary x-ray. He was hospitalised overnight and withdrawn for the rest of the meeting due to a concussion, torn neck ligaments and a fractured C5 vertebrae.

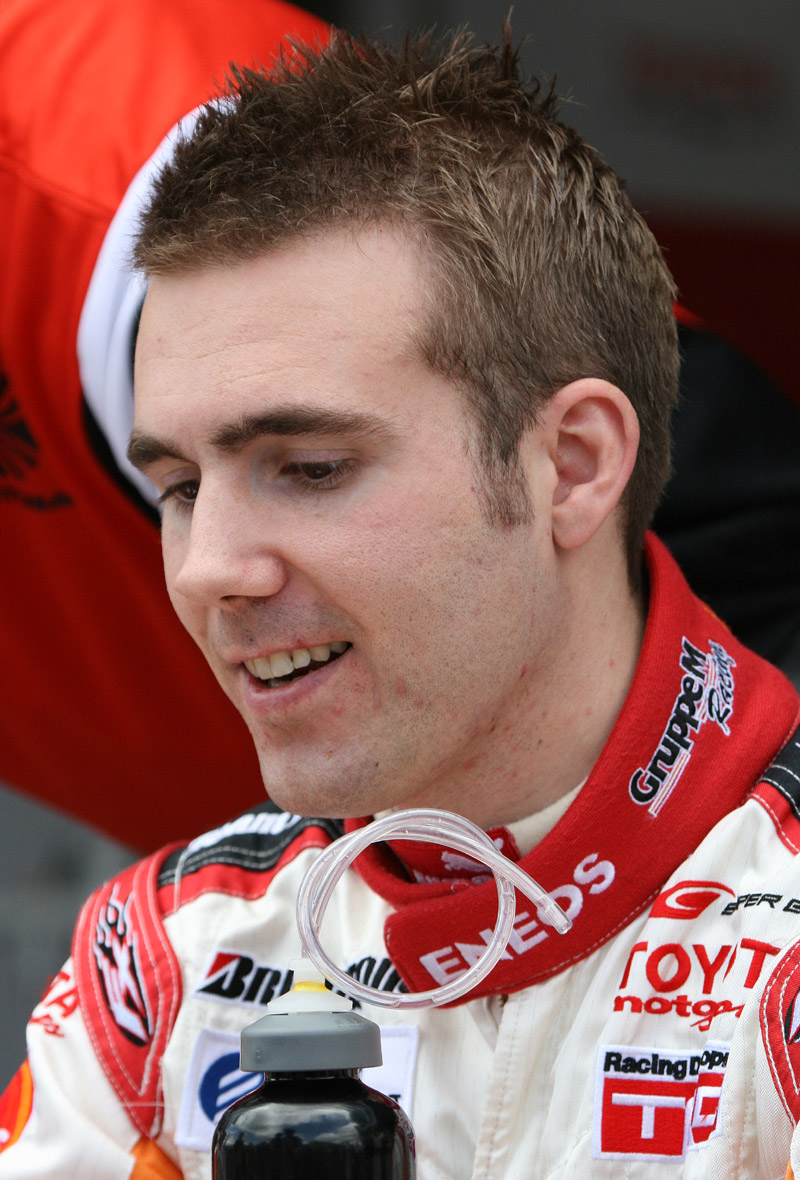
Björn Wirdheim (pictured in 2008) took pole position for the first leg of the Grand Prix.

Priaulx set the early pace in the second half-hour practice session, which took place in hot and clear weather on Friday morning, and he held the top spot until Wirdheim set the first sub 2:15 lap. The order continuously changed but practice's opening minutes did not have anyone record a sub 2:14 time. Monteiro adjusted his car's set-up to set the fastest lap time of 2:13.241, 0.112 seconds faster than Sato, who was quick throughout due to a car set-up change. Tréluyer was third after a mid-session collision with the wall. Positions four through ten were held by Cochet, Kaffer, Fukuda, Wirdheim, de Oliviera, Toccacelo and Priaulx.

The second 45-minute qualifying session on Friday afternoon was held in clear, hot and breezy weather. Provisional pole sitter Montin led early with the first sub 2:13 lap. Wirdheim prepared by inspecting and filming 20 laps of the track on VHS tape in a hire car with his race engineer early Tuesday morning. He attributed this to his efforts to take pole position from Montin, but Tréluyer quickly took it. Fukuda then set a new fastest lap before the session was stop due to Hackett's crash into the wall, which was recovered by track marshals. Wirdheim, Tréluyer, and Cochet traded pole before Wirdheim clinched it with a 2:11.983 lap, which the motorsport press considered surprising. Sato improved from ninth to join Wirdheim on the grid's front row in the final ten minutes, but he did not earn pole position because he swerved to avoid hitting Ho's car at the exit to Fisherman's Bend corner. Cochet failed to respond to Wirdheim and Sato's pace, remaining third. Montin dropped to fourth after failing to regain the necessary speed to rejoin the top three. He was just ahead of Tréluyer in fifth. Priaulx improved to sixth in second qualifying's last minute. Matsuura moved to seventh, as Monteiro and Fukuda fell to eighth ninth, respectively. Kaffer was tenth. Behind him the rest of the field lined up as Kaneishi, Ide, Toccacelo, Hayes, Jouanny, de Oliviera, Sundberg, Taylor, Gommendy, Kurosawa, Lee, Kovalainen, Giammaria, Yamamoto, Bobbi, Ho, Hackett, Lei and Merszei.

=== Qualifying classification ===
Each of the driver's fastest lap times from the two qualifying sessions are denoted in bold.

Final qualifying classification
Pos	No.	Driver	Team	Q1 Time	Rank	Q2 Time	Rank	Gap	Grid
1	27	(Sweden) Björn Wirdheim	Prema Powerteam	2:14.891	13	**2:11.983**	1	—	1
2	6	(Japan) Takuma Sato	Carlin Motorsport	2:13.546	2	**2:12.062**	2	+0.079	2
3	25	(France) Jonathan Cochet	Signature Team	2:13.676	3	**2:12.212**	3	+0.229	3
4	12	(Italy) Paolo Montin	TOM'S	2:13.214	1	**2:12.432**	4	+0.449	4
5	3	(France) Benoît Tréluyer	Mugen x Dome Project	2:14.383	9	**2:12.487**	5	+0.504	5
6	30	(United Kingdom) Andy Priaulx	Andy Priaulx	2:14.375	8	**2:12.581**	6	+0.598	6
7	28	(Japan) Kosuke Matsuura	Prema Powerteam	2:14.483	10	**2:12.718**	7	+0.735	7
8	18	(Portugal) Tiago Monteiro	ASM Formule 3	2:13.776	4	**2:12.902**	8	+0.919	8
9	8	(Japan) Ryō Fukuda	Saulnier Racing	2:14.047	7	**2:12.948**	9	+0.965	9
10	10	(Germany) Pierre Kaffer	Kolles Racing	2:14.586	12	**2:13.108**	10	+1.125	10
11	1	(Japan) Toshihiro Kaneishi	Bertram Schafer Racing	2:14.042	6	**2:13.686**	11	+1.703	11
12	26	(Japan) Yuji Ide	Signature Team	—	29	**2:13.715**	12	+1.732	12
13	5	(United Kingdom) Anthony Davidson	Carlin Motorsport	**2:13.839**	5	—	30	+1.856	—^{1}
14	2	(Italy) Enrico Toccacelo	Bertram Schafer Racing	2:14.894	14	**2:13.975**	13	+1.992	13
15	15	(United Kingdom) Derek Hayes	Derek Hayes	2:16.039	15	**2:13.989**	14	+2.006	14
16	31	(France) Bruce Jouanny	Bruce Jouanny	2:16.426	18	**2:14.484**	15	+2.501	15
17	19	(Brazil) João Paulo de Oliveira	Swiss Racing Team	**2:14.529**	11	2:14.556	16	+2.546	16
18	21	(Sweden) Peter Sundberg	ThreeBond Racing	2:17.363	21	**2:14.994**	17	+3.011	17
19	16	(United Kingdom) Mark Taylor	Manor Motorsport	15:47.588	28	**2:15.439**	18	+3.456	18
20	17	(France) Tristan Gommendy	ASM Formule 3	2:16.643	19	**2:15.485**	19	+3.502	19
21	20	(Japan) Haruki Kurosawa	Swiss Racing Team	2:22.388	24	**2:16.041**	20	+4.058	20
22	9	(Hong Kong) Marchy Lee	Saulnier Racing	**2:16.094**	16	2:16.117	21	+4.111	21
23	23	(Finland) Heikki Kovalainen	Fortec Motorsport	**2:16.139**	17	—	29	+4.156	22
24	33	(Italy) Raffaele Giammaria	Kolles Racing	—	30	**2:16.773**	22	+4.790	23
25	11	(Japan) Sakon Yamamoto	TOM'S	**2:17.188**	20	—	28	+5.205	24
26	36	(Italy) Matteo Bobbi	Target Racing	2:28.194	27	**2:17.393**	23	+5.410	25
27	32	(Macau) Michael Ho	Cram Competition	2:18.890	23	**2:17.612**	24	+5.629	26
28	7	(Australia) Peter Hackett	Carlin Motorsport	**2:17.726**	22	2:18.079	25	+5.743	27
29	22	(Macau) Lei Kit Meng	Fortec Motorsport	2:23.472	25	**2:19.504**	26	+7.521	28
30	29	(Macau) Jo Merszei	Cram Competition	2:26.044	26	**2:24.583**	27	+12.600	29
110% qualifying time: 2:25.181
**Bold time** indicates the faster of the two times that determined the grid order.

- **^1** – Anthony Davidson crashed heavily during the first qualifying session and he was declared medically unfit to take part in the race.

== Warm-up ==
On the morning of the race, a half-hour warm-up session was held. Montin lapped fastest at 2:12.836, nearly four-tenths of a second faster than Sato. Positions three to ten were occupied by pole sitter Wirdheim, Fukuda, Priaulx, Cochet, de Oliviera, Kaffer and the Japanese pair of Kaneishi and Matsuura.

== Race ==
Sunday's race was divided into two aggregate legs totaling 30 laps. The first 15-lap leg took place in the morning, and the results determined the starting order for the second leg, with the winner starting from pole position. Following that, a five-hour interval was observed to allow for the intervening support races. The second 15-lap leg took place later in the afternoon. The driver who completed all 30 laps in the shortest amount of time won the event overall.

=== Leg 1 ===
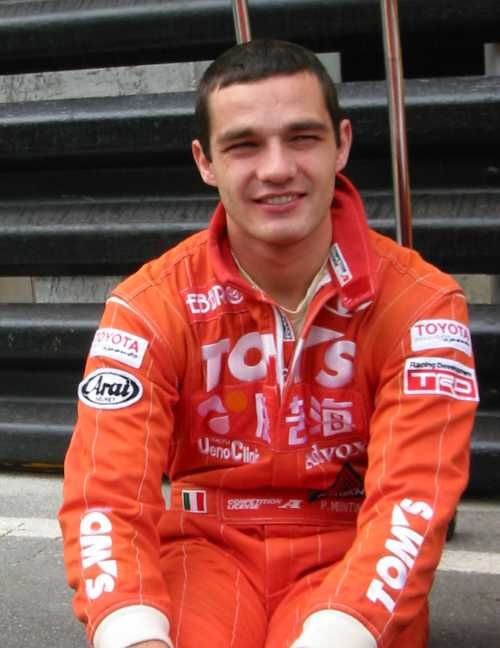
Paolo Montin (pictured in 2002) finished third in the first leg but he removed his rear-left wheel in the second leg and was out of contention for a top ten overall finish.

The race's first leg began in hot and sunny weather at 10:15 Macau Standard Time (UTC+08:00) on 18 November. Matsuura failed to start and was instructed to restart from the pit lane. Wirdheim and Sato both made quick starts, but neither led on the approach to Lisboa corner, where Cochet glimpsed open space and executed a slingshot pass to take the lead. Further down the order, two multi-car accidents caused the leg to be stopped. Hayes was slipstreaming Jouanny's rear on the straight into Lisboa turn when he felt a sudden spike of acceleration as he was about to be cautious. He then locked his brakes, launching himself over Jouanny's head and landing on Kaffer's car. Some drivers collided as they scrambled for open space to avoid becoming entangled in the incident. Yamamoto was greatly unsettled and he ran off at San Francisco Bend. This caused Giammaria to drive off the track in avoidance and he hit the trackside barrier. Eleven cars were damaged in both crashes and de Oliviera, Kaneishi, Sundberg, Lee and Gommendy retired.

Sato made a better getaway from the standing restart to slipstream past Wirdheim into Lisboa corner for the lead. Meanwhile, Cochet was unable to get off to a quick start, leaving him to battle Montin and Tréluyer. That freed Wirdheim to focus on staying with Sato if possible, as Cochet lost the duel and fell to sixth. Priaulx suffered a puncture and had to make a pit stop for new tyres to go several laps down. Sato pulled away from the rest of the field, leading Wirdheim by one second. Meanwhile, Monteiro and Toccacelo collided, forcing the latter to retire and the former to return to the pit lane for a new front wing. Taylor improved from nineteenth to eighth by the end of the third lap, while Kovalainen gained 13 positions to be in tenth. Montin overtook Tréluyer for third, but Tréluyer stayed close behind him. Similarly, Sato was unable to pull away from Wirdheim, who set a new fastest lap to catch up.

The safety car was deployed on lap four when Cochet spun at the Reservoir bend and hit the tyre wall. Fukuda collected him and sustained heavy left-hand damage. Although Fukuda exited his car unaided, he sustained a concussion and was transported by ambulance to the local hospital. Four laps later, the safety car was withdrawn and racing resumed. It was quickly deployed again when Taylor pushed too hard on cold tyres and lost control of his car at the Reservoir bend. He collided with the wall, removing a wheel that Hackett then struck. After the safety car was withdrawn on the ninth lap, racing resumed. The race became a procession as all drivers tried to avoid an unpleasant situation. Sato won the first leg and started the second from pole position after going unchallenged in the final six laps. Wirdheim was 1.490 seconds behind in second and Montin completed the podium in third. Off the podium, Tréluyer gained on Montin but settled for fourth. Matsuura finished fifth, Bobbi sixth, Ide seventh and Kovalainen eighth. Ho was the highest-placed Macanese driver in ninth and Hackett tenth. Outside the top ten, Lei finished 11th, having gained 18 positions from where he started. The final classified finishers were Merszei, Monteiro, and Gommendy, with Sato lapping the latter two twice.

=== Leg 2 ===
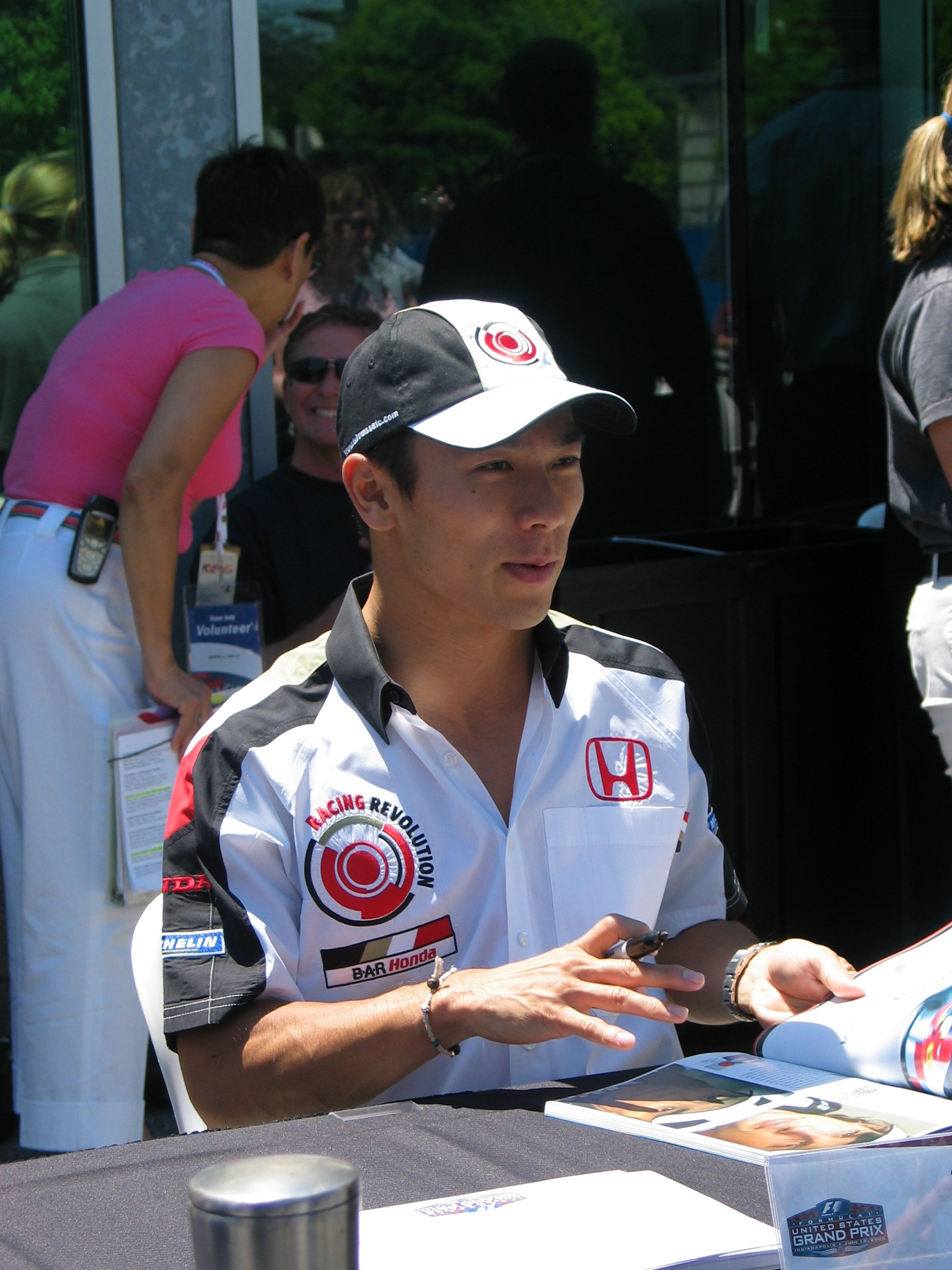
Takuma Sato (pictured in 2005) took the first victory for a Japanese driver in the history of the Macau Grand Prix.

The second leg began later that day at 15:40 local time, in hot and sunny weather. Taylor, Cochet, Fukuda, Sundberg, Giammaria, and Yamamoto were unable to begin because their cars were damaged beyond repair, reducing the field to 23 drivers. The driver's main concern in the middle of the grid was that they would be easily overtaken by faster vehicles, so Lei let them pass so he would not interfere. Sato made a good start and withstood heavy pressure from Montin to maintain his lead on the run to the first corner, despite a brush with the circuit's barrier. Tréluyer passed Wirdheim for second place despite having multiple cars alongside him. Kovalainen was unable to accelerate from his grid position and fell three-quarters of a lap behind Sato. While Sato pushed hard to establish a 1.4-second lead by the end of lap one, Wirdheim put Tréluyer under pressure in the battle for second. Bobbi was overtaken by Ide further back in the field, and Ho lost several positions to all drivers behind him except Kovalainen and Lee. Montin's rear-left wheel was removed in a collision with the wall on lap two. He drove slowly to the pit lane for a replacement wheel, and the extra time cost him a top-ten overall finish.

Sato's lead was cut slightly as Tréluyer pulled away from Wirdheim in third. Sato responded by increasing his lead by a small margin the following lap, and he did the same whenever Tréluyer appeared to be closing in on him. Hayes attempted to make up for the first leg by breaking Narain Karthikeyan's Guia Circuit race track lap record of 2:12.921 seconds set the previous year. He caught Kurosawa and easily overtook him before focusing on Hackett, whom he quickly passed. By the end of the seventh lap, Hackett had lost more positions to Kaneishi and de Oliviera as they attempted to recover lost ground from not restarting the first leg. Monteiro led a battle over fifth with Priaulx, Kaffer, and Ide, who prevented Monteiro from passing him, and Priaulx eventually overtook Monteiro. Kaffer challenged Monteiro for sixth as Ide lost fifth to Priaulx on lap 12. This unsettled Ide, who was overtaken by Monteiro and Kaffer and dropped to eighth soon after due to his four-lap delay. Matsuura was separated from the quartet by Wirdheim, who began to challenge Tréluyer in slower traffic.

"I am totally happy now. This is obviously my last major F3 Grand Prix race ever and I am so happy to come back here. It is always difficult to race here but in the end I drove so hard, enjoyed my racing and won. This was something I wanted very much to achieve and now I have done it – it was one of my biggest challenges so far and I am so pleased to have succeeded."

— Takuma Sato on winning the 48th Macau Grand Prix.

Tréluyer was distracted long enough for Wirdheim to attempt an overtake, which the former blocked. During the last lap, Jouanny and Hayes passed Bobbi on the road. Meanwhile, Sato was unchallenged for the rest of the second leg on his second appearance in Macau, finishing it ten minutes faster than the first and winning outright, the first victory for a Japanese driver in the race's history. Tréluyer followed 4.410 seconds later in second and Wirdheim took third overall. Matsuura and Ide of Japan finished fourth and fifth, respectively. Bobbi finished sixth, Hackett seventh, Kovalainen eighth, and the Macanese duo of Ho and Lei completed the top ten. Montin, Merszei, Monteiro, Gommendy, and Kurosawa were the final classified finishers.

=== Race classification ===
Final race classification
Pos	No.	Driver	Team	Laps	Grid
1	6	(Japan) Takuma Sato	Carlin Motorsport	30	2
2	3	(France) Benoît Tréluyer	Mugen x Dome Project	30	5
3	27	(Sweden) Björn Wirdheim	Prema Powerteam	30	1
4	28	(Japan) Kosuke Matsuura	Prema Powerteam	30	7
5	26	(Japan) Yuji Ide	Signature Team	30	12
6	36	(Italy) Matteo Bobbi	Target Racing	30	26
7	7	(Australia) Peter Hackett	Carlin Motorsport	30	27
8	23	(Finland) Heikki Kovalainen	Fortec Motorsport	30	22
9	32	(Macau) Michael Ho	Cram Competition	30	26
10	22	(Macau) Lei Kit Meng	Fortec Motorsport	30	28
11	12	(Italy) Paolo Montin	TOM'S	29	4
12	29	(Macau) Jo Merszei	Cram Competition	29	29
13	18	(Portugal) Tiago Monteiro	ASM Formule 3	28	8
14	17	(France) Tristan Gommendy	ASM Formule 3	28	19
15	20	(Japan) Haruki Kurosawa	Swiss Racing Team	27	20
NC	30	(United Kingdom) Andy Priaulx	Andy Priaulx	26	6
NC	31	(France) Bruce Jouanny	Bruce Jouanny	21	15
NC	10	(Germany) Pierre Kaffer	Kolles Racing	15	10
NC	15	(United Kingdom) Derek Hayes	Derek Hayes	15	14
NC	19	(Brazil) João Paulo de Oliveira	Swiss Racing Team	15	16
NC	9	(Hong Kong) Marchy Lee	Saulnier Racing	15	21
NC	1	(Japan) Toshihiro Kaneishi	Bertram Schafer Racing	11	11
NC	16	(United Kingdom) Mark Taylor	Manor Motorsport	7	18
NC	8	(Japan) Ryō Fukuda	Saulnier Racing	3	9
NC	25	(France) Jonathan Cochet	Signature Team	3	3
NC	2	(Italy) Enrico Toccacelo	Bertram Schafer Racing	3	13
DNS	33	(Italy) Raffaele Giammaria	Kolles Racing	—	23
DNS	21	(Sweden) Peter Sundberg	ThreeBond Racing	—	17
DNS	11	(Japan) Sakon Yamamoto	TOM'S	—	24
DNS	5	(United Kingdom) Anthony Davidson	Carlin Motorsport	—	—
Fastest lap: Derek Hayes, 2:12.921 165.75 km/h (102.99 mph) on lap 11 (leg two)
