= 2013 Australian GT Championship =

Motor racing competition

Seasons
- ← 2012 2014 →

The 2013 Australian GT Championship was an Australian motor racing competition open to GT style closed production based sports cars which were either approved by the FIA for GT3 competition or approved by the Confederation of Australian Motor Sport (CAMS) as Australian GTs. It was sanctioned by CAMS as a National Championship with Australian GT Sportscar Group Pty Ltd appointed as the Category Manager. It was the 17th Australian GT Championship, the twelfth to be contested over a multi-event championship, and the eighth to be contested since the title was revived in 2005.

The championship was won by reigning Australian GT champion Klark Quinn, driving a Porsche 911 GT3-R Type 997.

== Race calendar ==
The championship was contested over a six round series.

Rd.	Circuit	Location/ state	Date	Format	Winner			
Rd.	Circuit	Location/ state	Date	Format	Championship	Trophy	Challenge	Sports
1	Mount Panorama Circuit	Bathurst, New South Wales	8–10 February	One race	Klark Quinn, Shane van Gisbergen, Matt Kingsley		Ben Foessel	Michael Hovey
2	Adelaide Street Circuit	Adelaide, South Australia	28 February – 3 March	Two races	Craig Baird	Jordan Ormsby	Michael Almond	Darren Berry, Liam Talbot
3	Phillip Island Grand Prix Circuit	Phillip Island, Victoria	24–26 May	Two races	Jack Le Brocq	Steven McLaughlan	George Foessel	Mark Griffith, Jack Perkins
4	Sydney Motorsport Park	Sydney, New South Wales	12–14 July	Two races	Jack Le Brocq	Steven McLaughlan	Brendon Cook, Matt Kingsley	Mark Griffith; Jack Perkins
5	Queensland Raceway	Ipswich, Queensland	2–4 August	Three races	Klark Quinn	Steven McLaughlan	Brendon Cook, Matt Kingsley	Mark Griffith, Jack Perkins
6	Highlands Motorsport Park	Cromwell, Otago, New Zealand	8–10 November	Two races	Tony Quinn, Fabian Coulthard	Andrew Waite, Simon Evans	Ben Foessel, Michael Almond	Mark Griffith, Jack Perkins

The results for each round of the Championship were determined by the number of points scored by each driver within their division at that round.

During each race in Rounds 2, 3, 4 and 5 of the Championship, each automobile was required to complete one compulsory pit stop during a prescribed pit stop window. During the compulsory pit stop, each automobile was required to remain stationary for a prescribed minimum time plus any additional time required dependent on Driver Classification (i.e. Pro, Master or Gold).

Round 1 at Mount Panorama was contested over the first 50 minutes of the 2013 Liqui Moly Bathurst 12 Hour race. With no compulsory pit stop at the event, time was added to the race time of each automobile, equivalent to double the time prescribed for the Driver Classification of the driver that started the race.

== Divisions ==
Drivers' titles were awarded in four divisions.

- GT Championship – for FIA GT3 specification vehicles
- GT Trophy – for older specification FIA GT3 vehicles
- GT Challenge – for cars that no longer fit within the GT Championship and GT Trophy divisions
- GT Sports – for GT4 specification cars

== Points system ==
Championship points were awarded to each eligible Driver, based on their qualifying position at each round of the Championship and on their finishing position in each race of the Championship, relative to the other Drivers within their division, in accordance with the following table.

Position	1st	2nd	3rd	4th	5th	6th	7th	8th	9th	10th	11th	12th	13th	14th	15th	16th	17th	18th	19th	All other finishers
Qualifying	10	8	7	6	5	4	3	2	1	0	0	0	0	0	0	0	0	0	0	0
Races	50	42	35	30	25	20	18	16	14	12	10	9	8	7	6	5	4	3	2	1

Each Competitor who had registered for the entire series could nominate one Round for each automobile, selected from Rounds 2, 3, 4 or 5 only, where double points would be awarded to each Driver entered in that automobile for that Round.

== Championship results ==
=== GT Championship ===
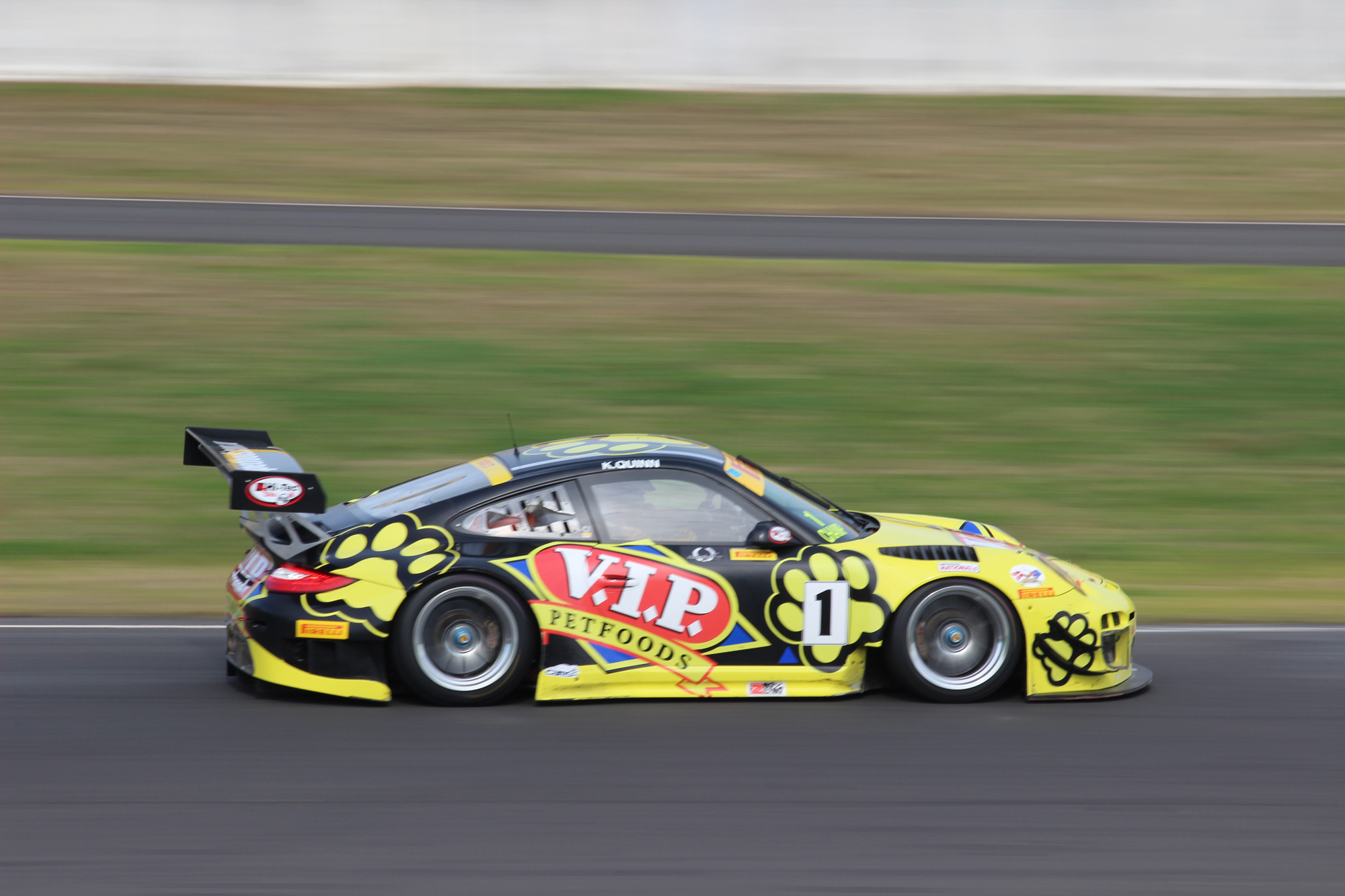
Defending champion Klark Quinn won the 2013 title driving a Porsche 911 GT3-R Type 997.

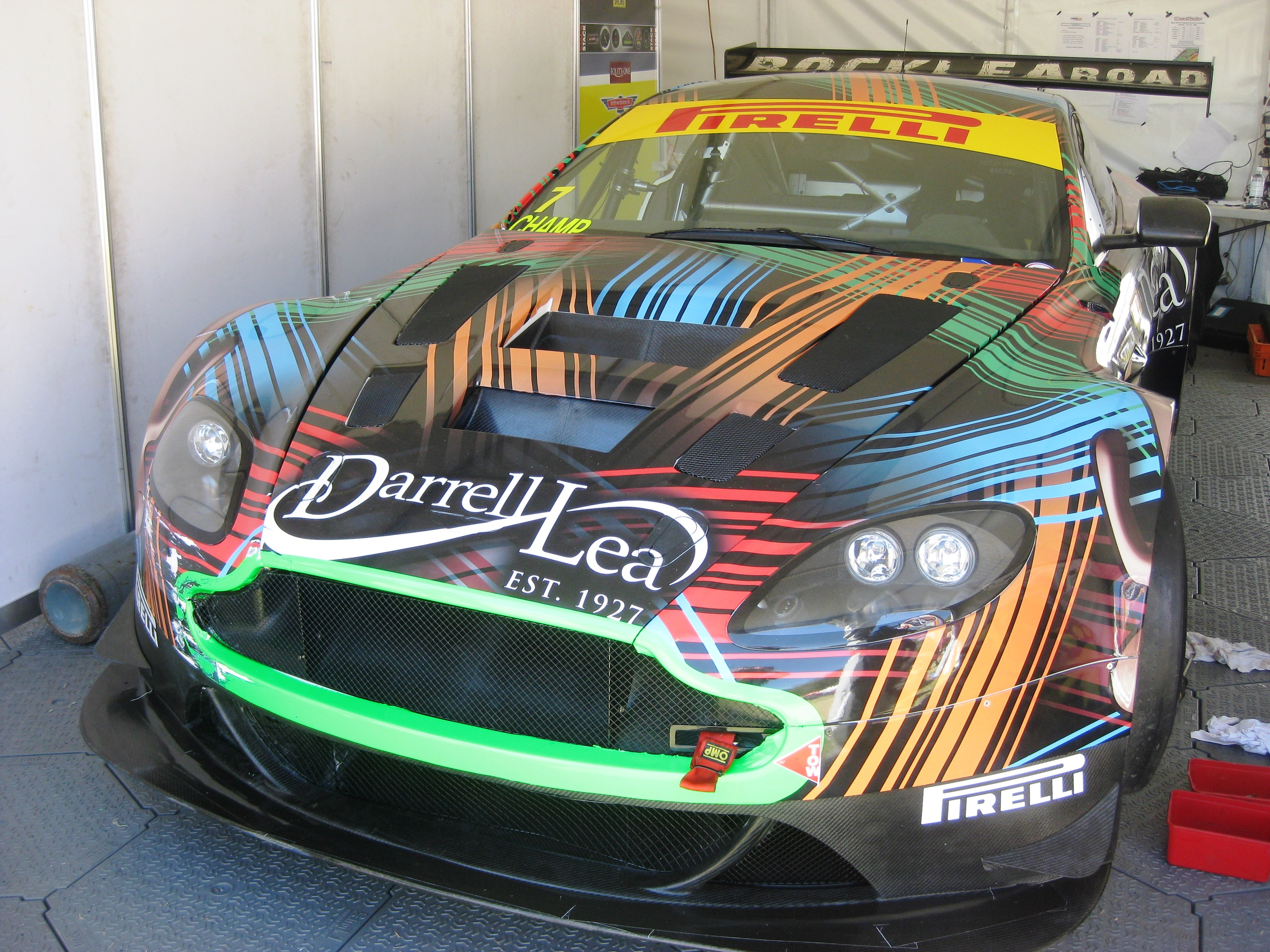
Tony Quinn placed second driving an Aston Martin Vantage

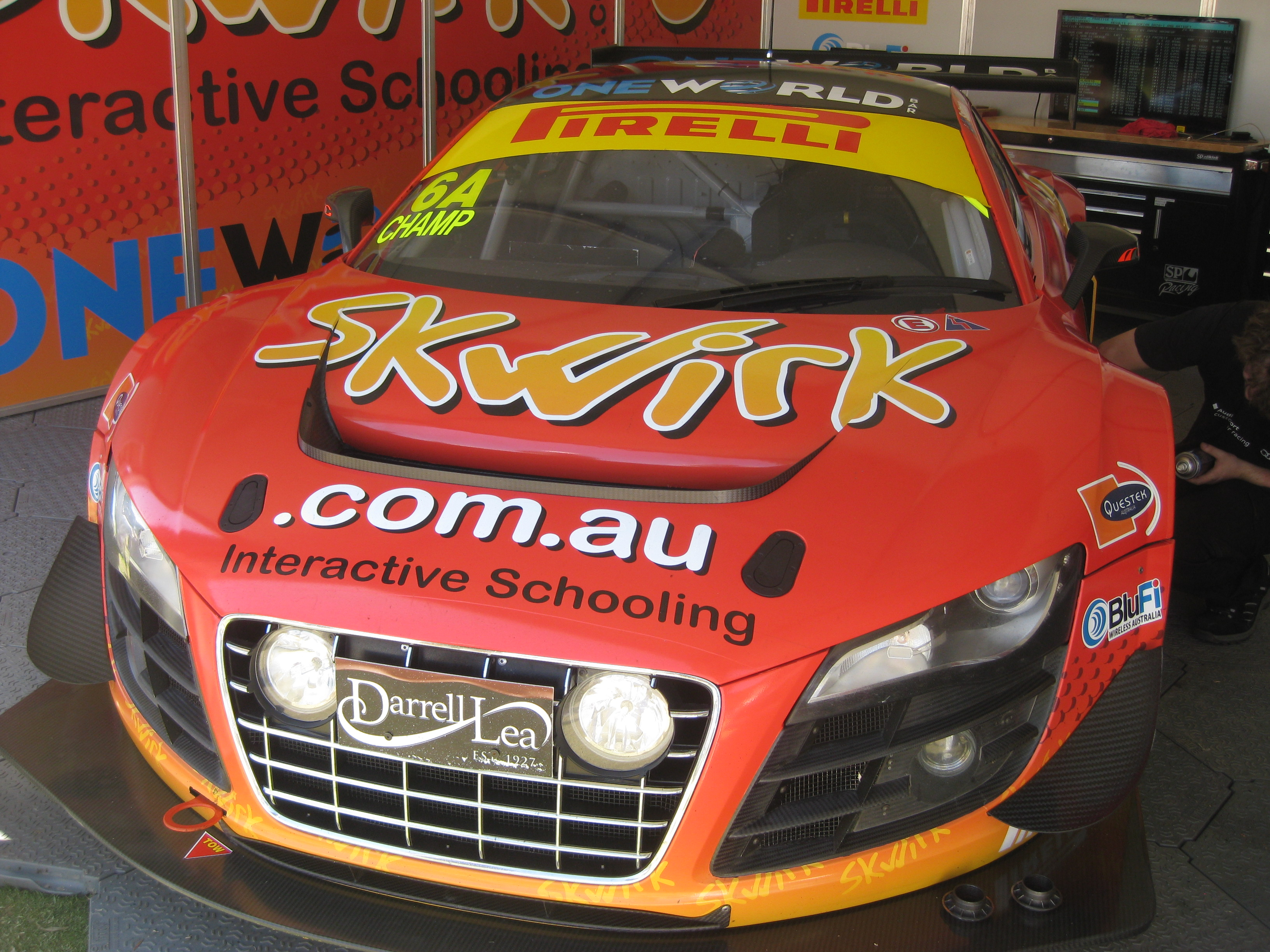
Rod Salmon placed third driving an Audi R8 LMS Ultra

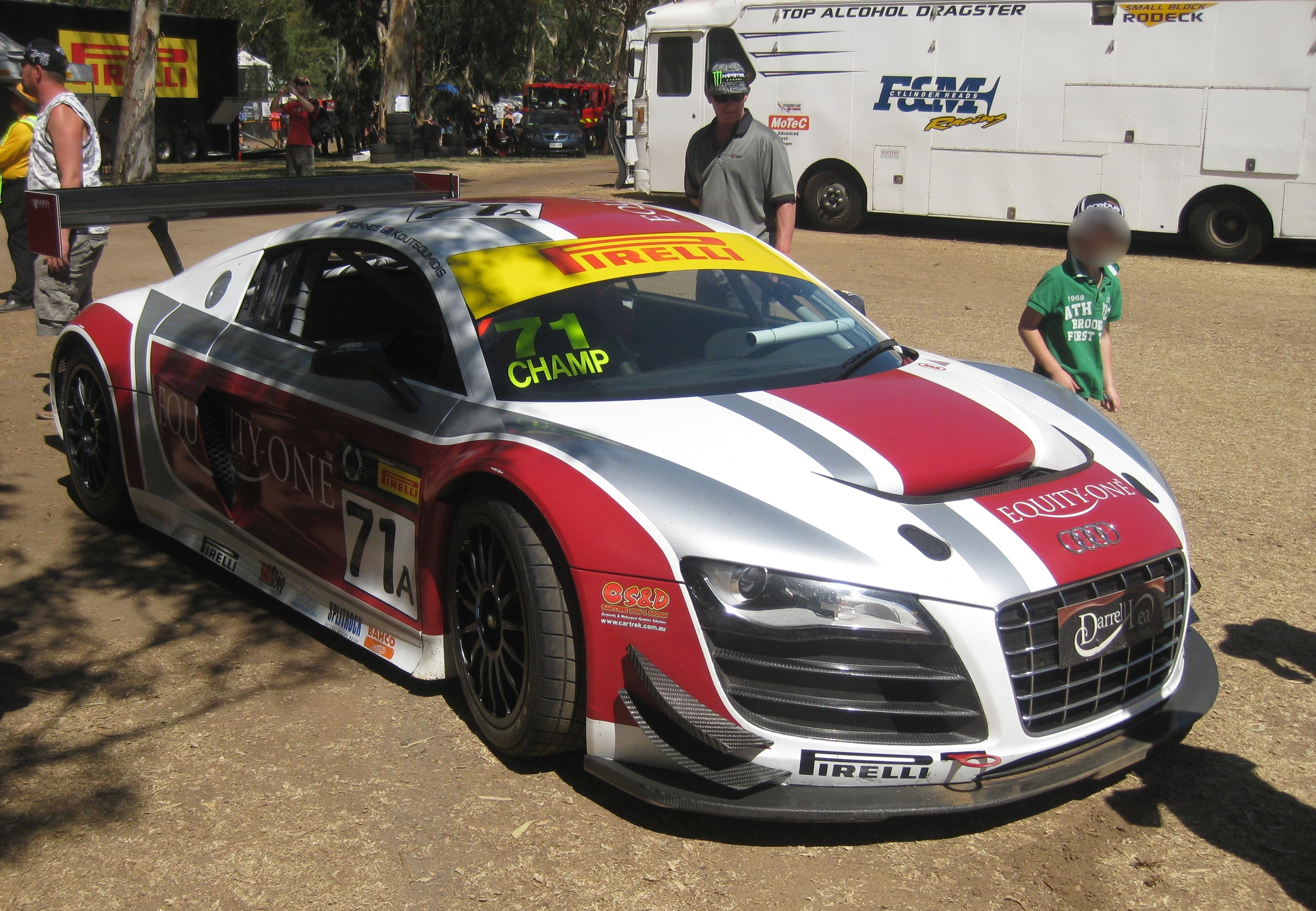
Dean Koutsoumidis placed fifth driving an Audi R8 LMS GT3

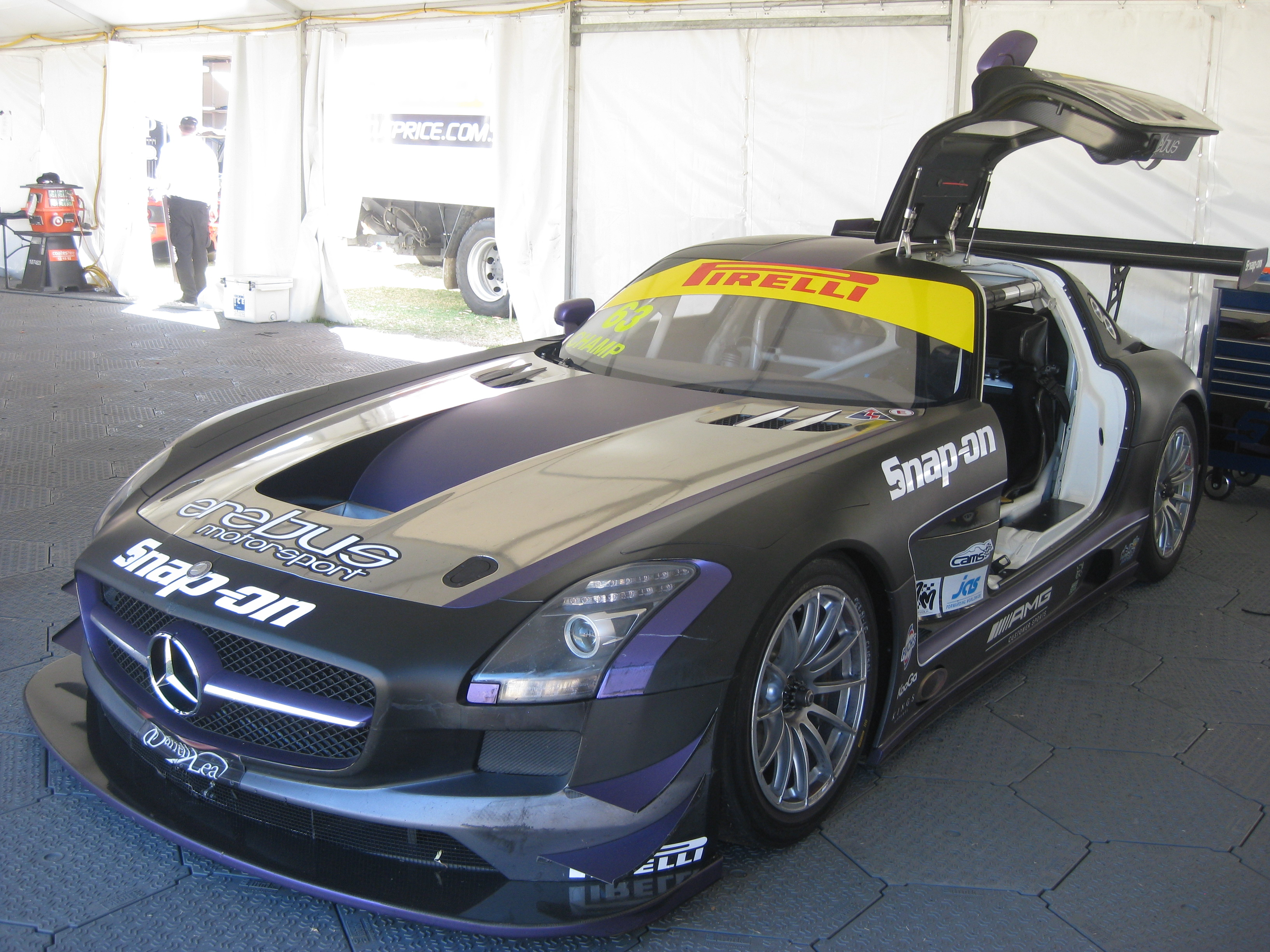
Craig Baird placed eighth driving Ferrari, Mercedes-Benz (pictured) & Porsche

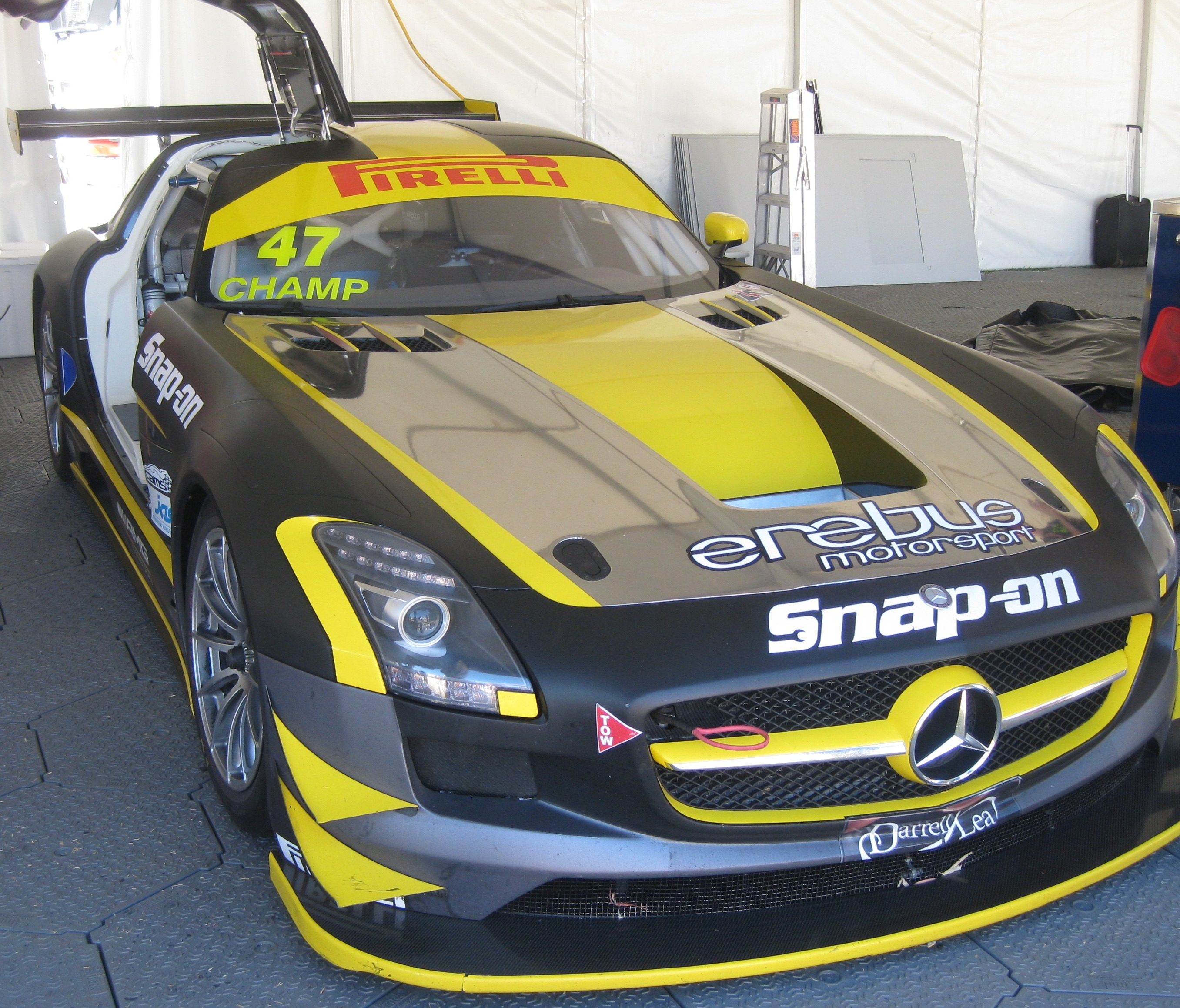
Christian Klien placed thirty sixth driving a Mercedes-Benz SLS AMG GT3

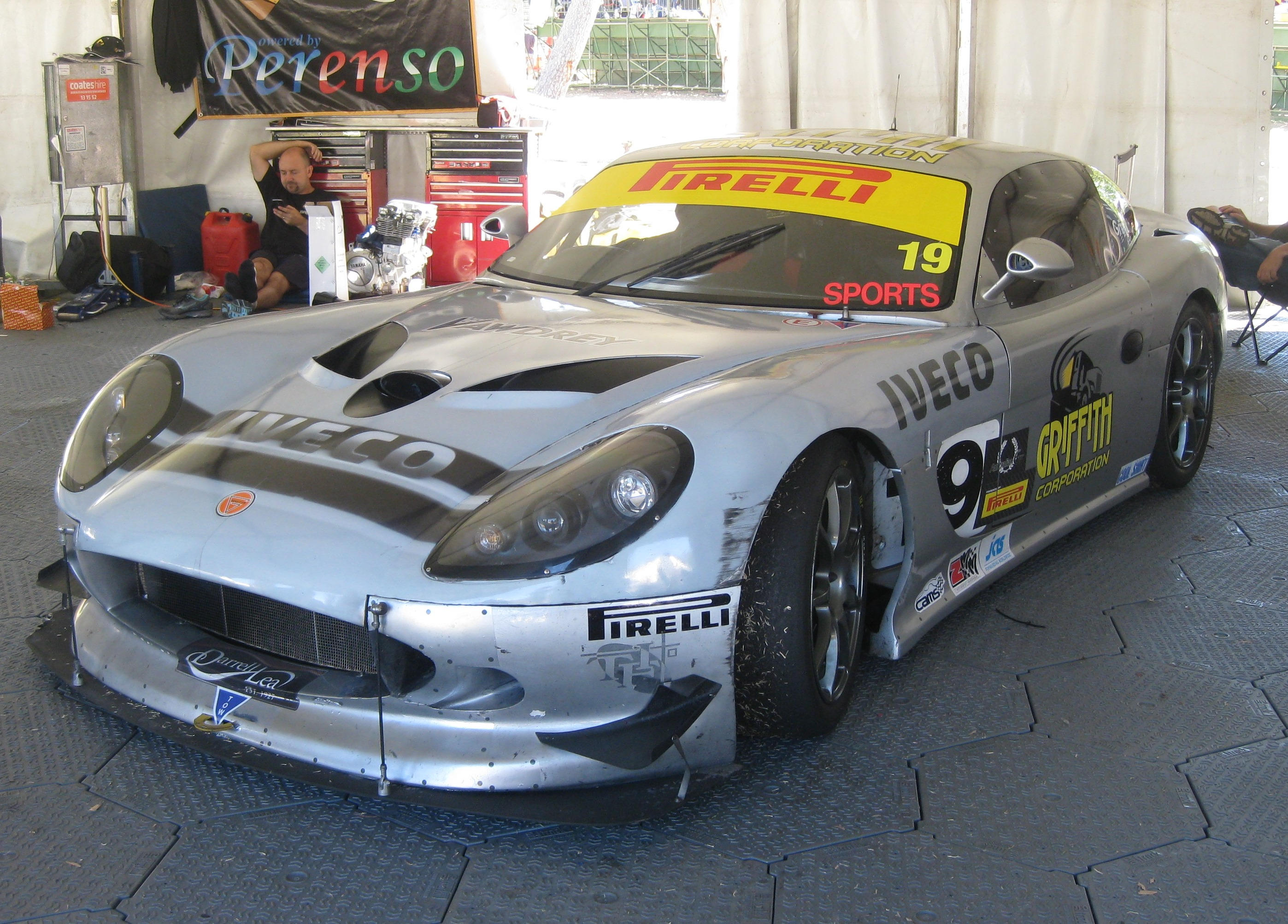
Mark Griffith won the GT Sports division driving a Ginetta G50 GT4

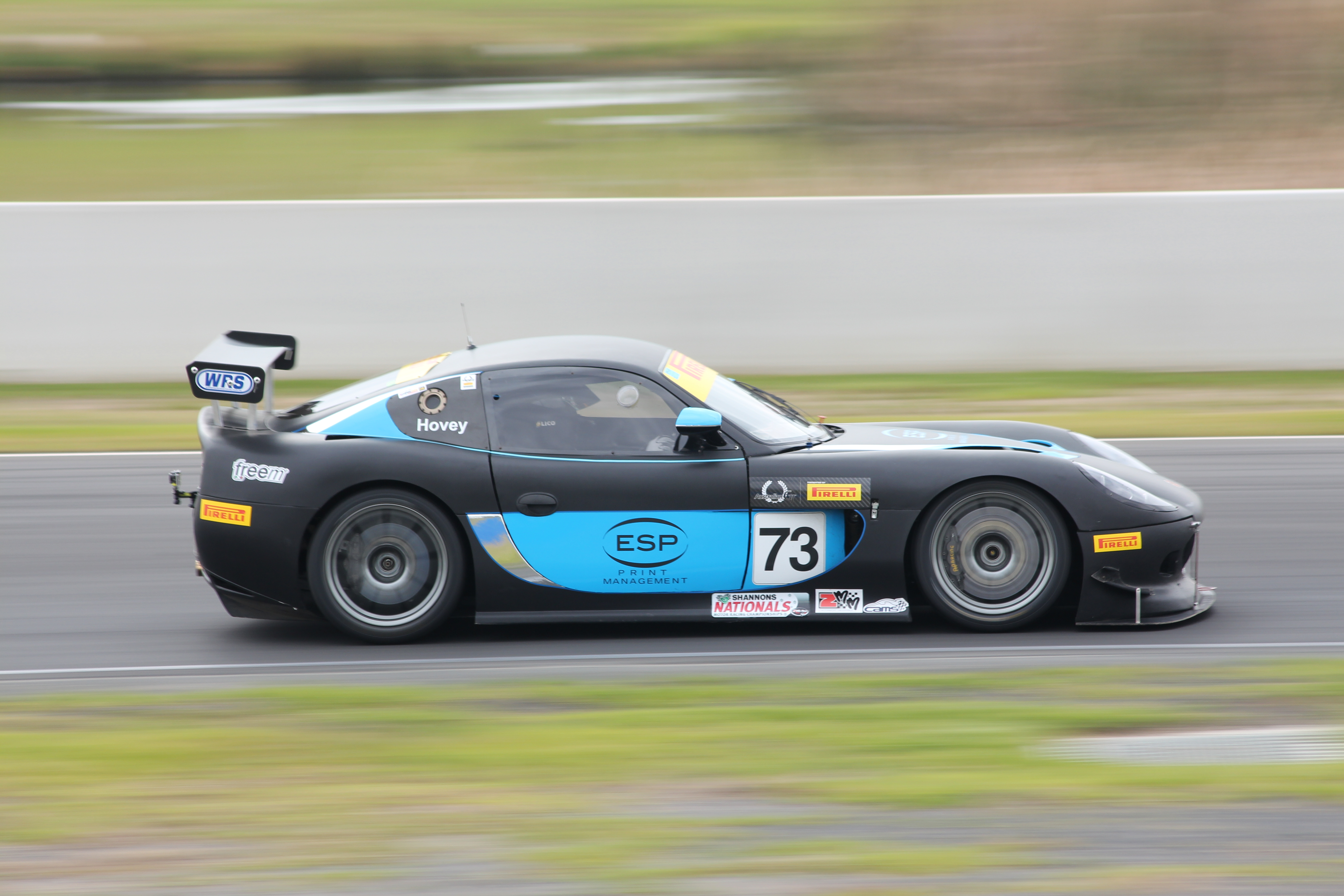
Michael Hovey placed third in the GT Sports division driving a Ginetta G50 GT4

GT Championship results

Pos.	Driver	No.	Car	Competitor / Team	Points
1	Klark Quinn	5; 1	Porsche 911 GT3-R Type 997	VIP Petfoods	627
2	Tony Quinn	7	Aston Martin Vantage GT3	VIP Petfoods, Darrell Lea	523
3	Rod Salmon	6	Audi R8 LMS Ultra	Melbourne Performance Centre	352
4	John Bowe	88	Ferrari 458 Italia GT3	Maranello Motorsport	334
5	Dean Koutsoumidis (Note: Driver appears twice on GT Championship results published at www.gtchampionship.com.au. The GT Championship table has been adjusted to remove these double entries.)	71	Audi R8 LMS GT3	Equity-One Mortgage Fund	305
6	Peter Edwards	88	Ferrari 458 Italia GT3	Maranello Motorsport	252
7	Roger Lago	11; 23	Lamborghini Gallardo LP600 GT3	Lago Racing	234
8	Craig Baird	33; 63; 1	Ferrari 458 Italia GT3; Mercedes-Benz SLS AMG GT3; Porsche 911 GT3-R Type 997	Clearwater Racing; Erebus Motorsport; VIP Petfoods	220
9	Jack Le Brocq	36	Mercedes-Benz SLS AMG GT3	Erebus Motorsport	220
10	Justin McMillan	48	Lamborghini Gallardo LP600	M Motorpsort	195
11	Andrew McInnes	71	Audi R8 LMS GT3	Equity-One Mortgage Fund	183
12	Jim Manolios	29	Chevrolet Corvette Z06 GT3R	Trofeo Motorsport / Pirelli	106
13	Andrew Taplin	2	Ferrari 458 Italia GT3	Taplin Real Estate	100
14	Ivan Capelli	29	Chevrolet Corvette Z06 GT3R	Trofeo Motorsport / Pirelli	73
15	Nathan Antunes	6	Audi R8 LMS Ultra	Melbourne Performance Centre	63
16	Shane van Gisbergen	5	Porsche 911 GT3-R Type 997	VIP Petfoods	54
17	Allan Simonsen	88	Ferrari 458 Italia GT3	Maranello Motorsport	50
18	Mika Salo	88	Ferrari 458 Italia GT3	Maranello Motorsport	50
19	James Winslow	6	Audi R8 LMS Ultra	Melbourne Performance Centre	42
20	Greg Murphy	29	Chevrolet Corvette Z06 GT3R; McLaren MP4-12C GT3	Trofeo Motorsport / Pirelli; VIP Petfoods Racing	37
21	Simon Middleton	71	Audi R8 LMS GT3	Equity-One Mortgage Fund	30
22	Darryl O'Young	71	Audi R8 LMS GT3	Equity-One Mortgage Fund	30
23	Lee Holdsworth	63	Mercedes-Benz SLS AMG GT3	Erebus Motorsport	26
24	Tim Slade	63	Mercedes-Benz SLS AMG GT3	Erebus Motorsport	26
25	Peter Hackett	63	Mercedes-Benz SLS AMG GT3	Erebus Motorsport	26
26	Matt Griffin	33	Ferrari 458 Italia GT3	Clearwater Racing	25
27	Mok Weng Sun	33	Ferrari 458 Italia GT3	Clearwater Racing	25
28	Warren Luff	6	Audi R8 LMS Ultra	Melbourne Performance Centre	21
29	Craig Lowndes	6	Audi R8 LMS Ultra	Melbourne Performance Centre	21
30	Thomas Jäger	36	Mercedes-Benz SLS AMG GT3	Erebus Motorsport	19
31	Bernd Schneider	36	Mercedes-Benz SLS AMG GT3	Erebus Motorsport	19
32	Alex Roloff	36	Mercedes-Benz SLS AMG GT3	Erebus Motorsport	19
33	Steven Richards	48	Lamborghini Gallardo LP600	M Motorpsort	18
34	Peter Kox	11	Lamborghini Gallardo LP600 GT3	Lago Racing	16
35	David Russell	11	Lamborghini Gallardo LP600 GT3	Lago Racing	16
36	Christian Klien	47	Mercedes-Benz SLS AMG GT3	Erebus Motorsport	0
37	Ross Lilley	48	Lamborghini Gallardo LP600	M Motorpsort	0

=== GT Trophy ===
GT Trophy results

Pos.	Driver	No.	Car	Competitor / Team	Points
1	Steven McLaughlan	75	Dodge Viper Competition Coupe Series II	Jamec Pem Racing	308
2	Jan Jinadasa	77	Lamborghini Gallardo LP520 GT3	Jan Jinadasa	220
3	Jordan Ormsby	61	Porsche 911 GT3 Cup Type 997	Golf Car Solutions	102
4	Kevin Weeks	8	Lamborghini Gallardo LP520 GT3	Supaloc	58

=== GT Challenge ===
GT Challenge results

Pos.	Driver	No.	Car	Competitor / Team	Points
1	Ben Foessel	4	Porsche 911 GT3 Cup Type 996	Motor School	596
2	Brendon Cook	25	Porsche 911 GT3 Cup Type 996	McElrea Racing	460
3	George Foessel	3	Porsche 911 GT3 Type 997	Motor School	391
4	Matt Kingsley	25	Porsche 911 GT3 Cup Type 996	McElrea Racing	346
5	Michael Almond	46	Porsche 911 GT3 Cup Type 997	Copyworld	218
6	John Goodacre	66	Porsche 911 GT3 Cup Type 997	GapSolutions / Sketor	91
7	Kiang Kuan Wong	15	Porsche 911 GT3 R Type 996	ULX110 Custom	61
8	Brenton GriGuol	36	Ferrari 360 Challenge	Koala Car Rentals	39
9	Keith Wong	15	Porsche 911 GT3 R Type 996	ULX110 Custom	0

=== GT Sports ===
GT Sports results

Pos.	Driver	No.	Car	Competitor / Team	Points
1	Mark Griffith	19	Ginetta G50 GT4	Mark Griffith	607
2	Jack Perkins	19	Ginetta G50 GT4	Mark Griffith	600
3	Michael Hovey	73	Ginetta G50 GT4	ES Australia	538
4	Tony Martin	9	Ginetta G50 GT4	TM Motorsports	507
5	Liam Talbot	50	Ginetta G50 GT4	Refresh Cosmetic & Laser Clinic	324
6	Darren Berry	50	Ginetta G50 GT4	Refresh Cosmetic & Laser Clinic	219
7	Lee Castle	9	Ginetta G50 GT4	TM Motorsports	142
