= 2012 Australian GT Championship =

Motor racing competition

Seasons
- ← 2011 2013 →

The 2012 Australian GT Championship was a CAMS sanctioned national motor racing championship open to GT style closed production based sports cars which were either approved by the FIA for GT3 competition or approved by CAMS as Australian GTs.

It was the 16th Australian GT Championship, the twelfth to be contested over a multi-event championship, and the eighth to be contested since the title was revived in 2005.

The series had a new owner for 2012, with seasoned GT racer Tony Quinn taking over the series towards the end of the 2011 season.

The championship was won by Klark Quinn driving a Porsche 911 GT3-R.

== Divisions ==
After consolidation from three divisions to two in 2011, the 2012 series saw an expansion to four divisions, based on vehicle eligibility and specification.

- GT Championship – for FIA GT3 specification vehicles
- GT Trophy – for older specification FIA GT3 vehicles
- GT Challenge – for cars that no longer fit within the GT Championship and Trophy divisions
- GT Sports – for GT4 specification cars

== Teams and drivers ==
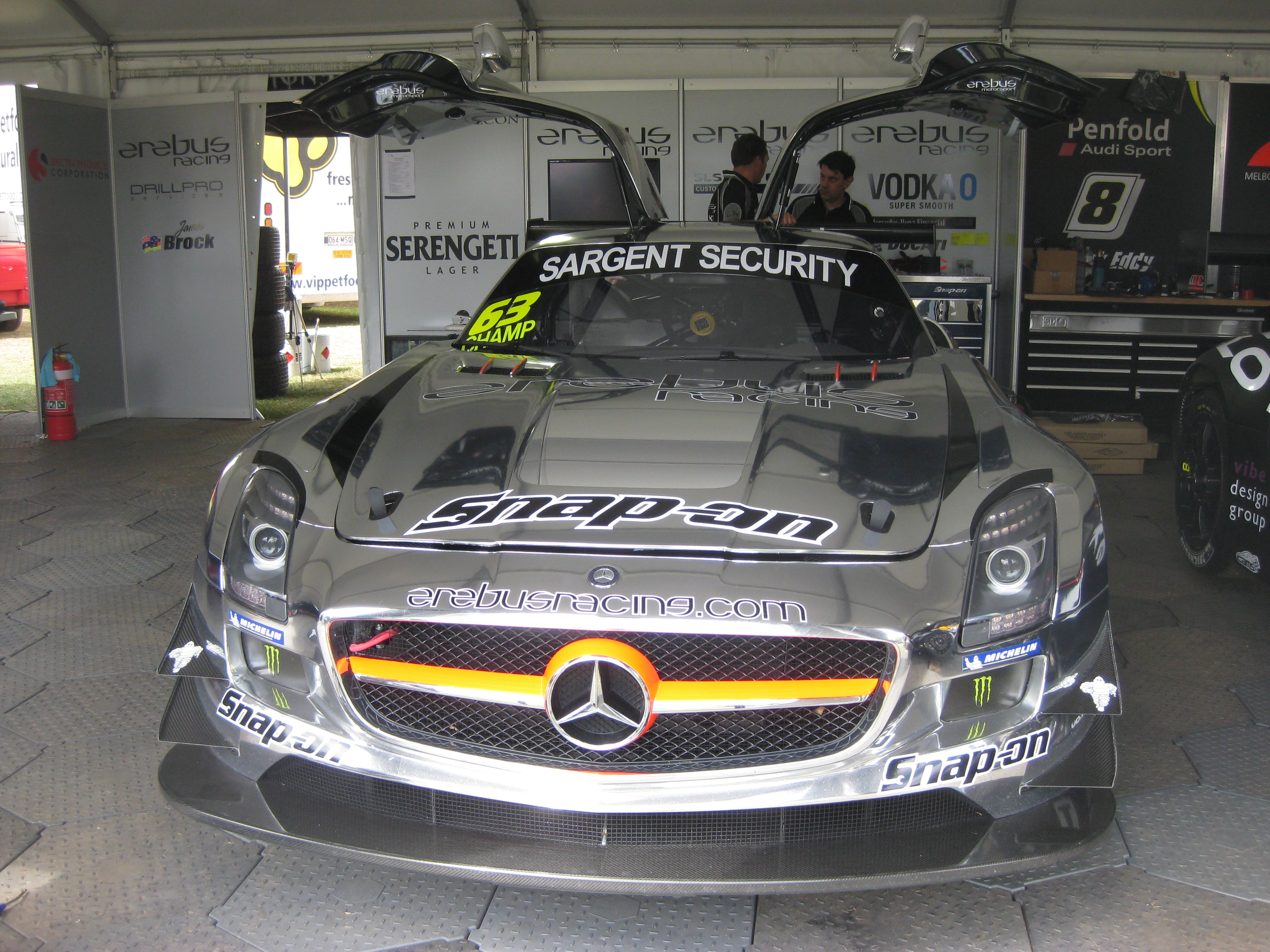
Peter Hacket (Mercedes-Benz SLS AMG GT3) placed second in the GT Championship

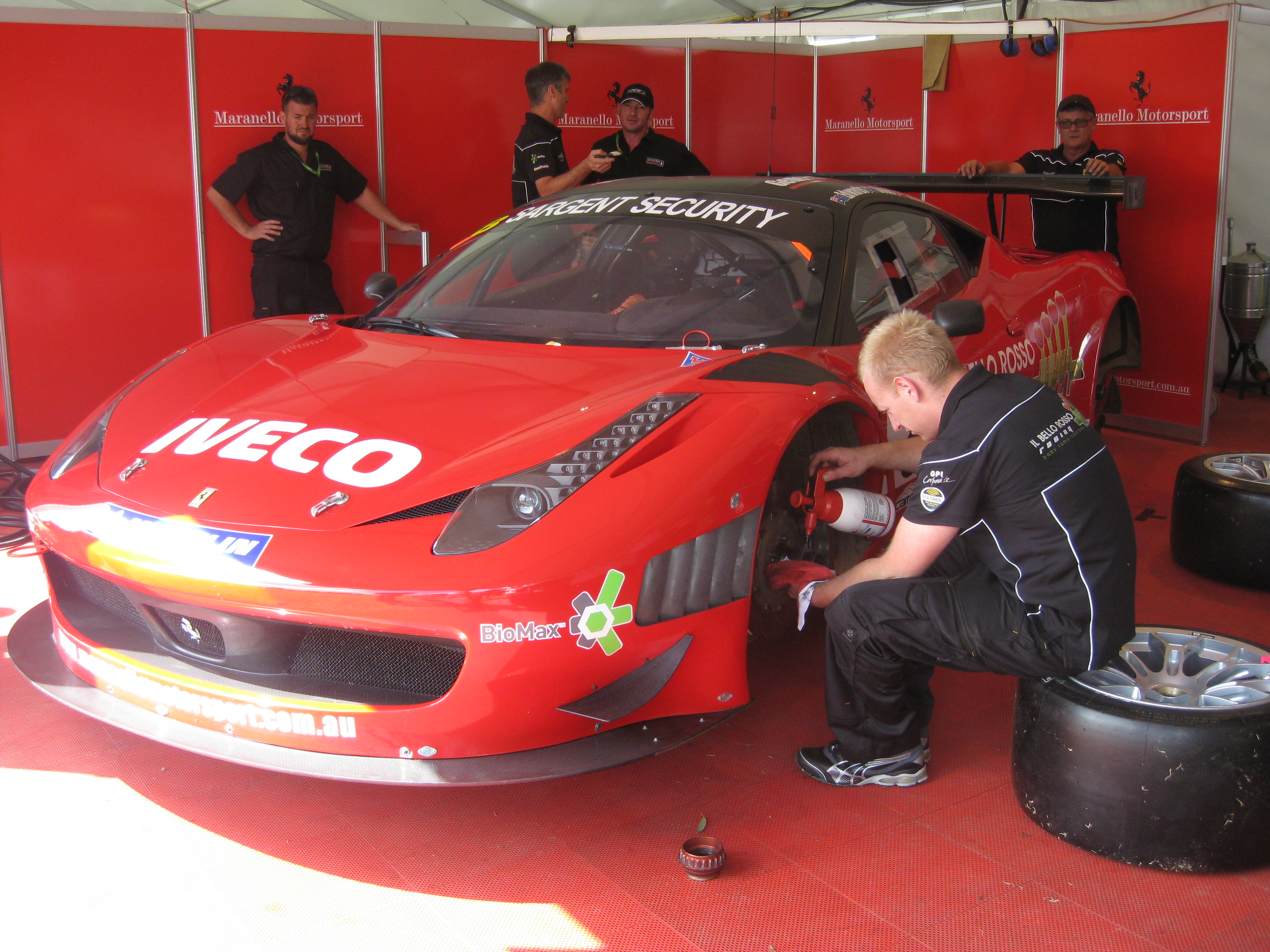
Peter Edwards & John Bowe (Ferrari 458 Italia GT3) placed third in the GT Championship

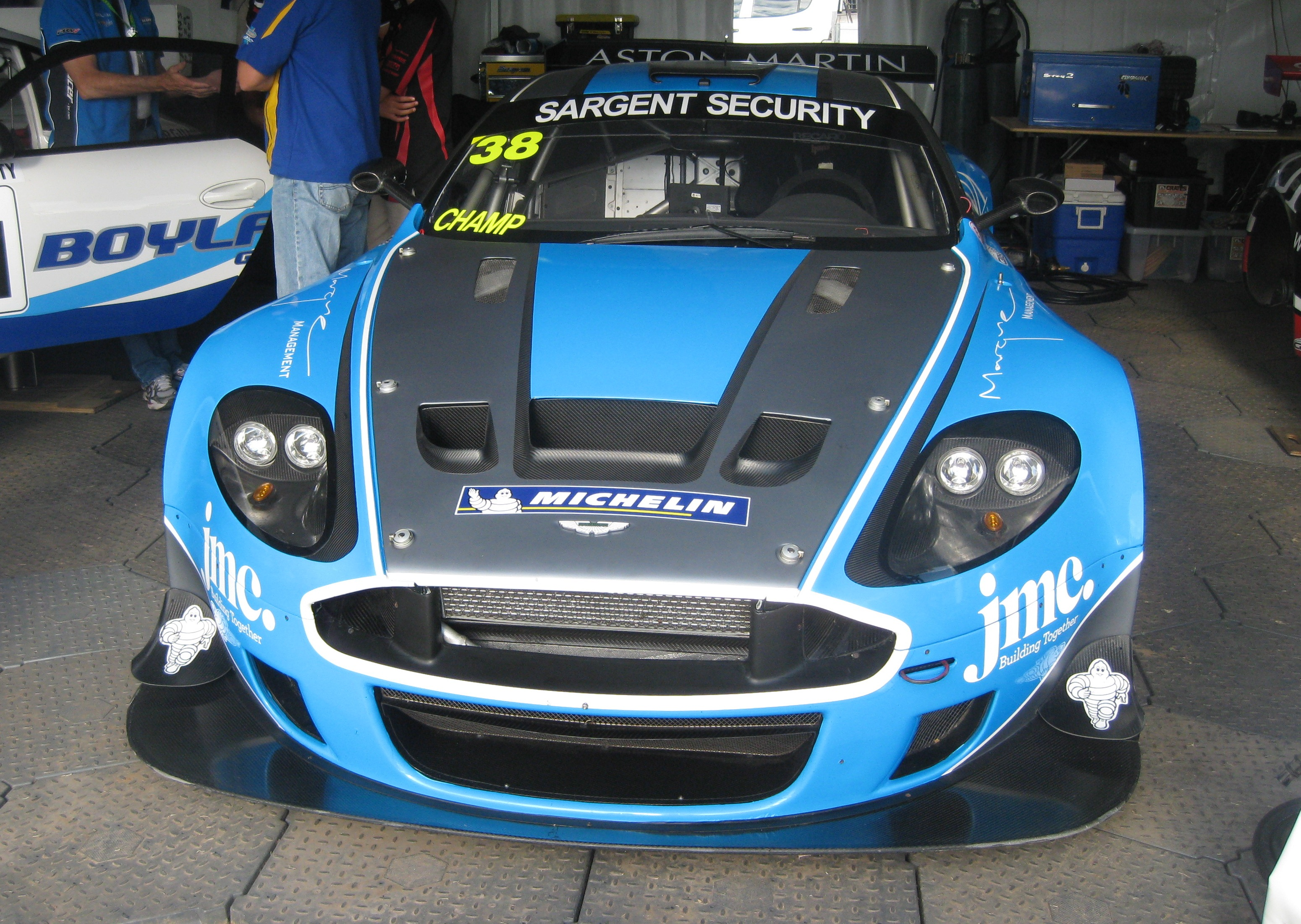
Ben Eggleston (Aston Martin DBRS9) placed sixth in the GT Championship

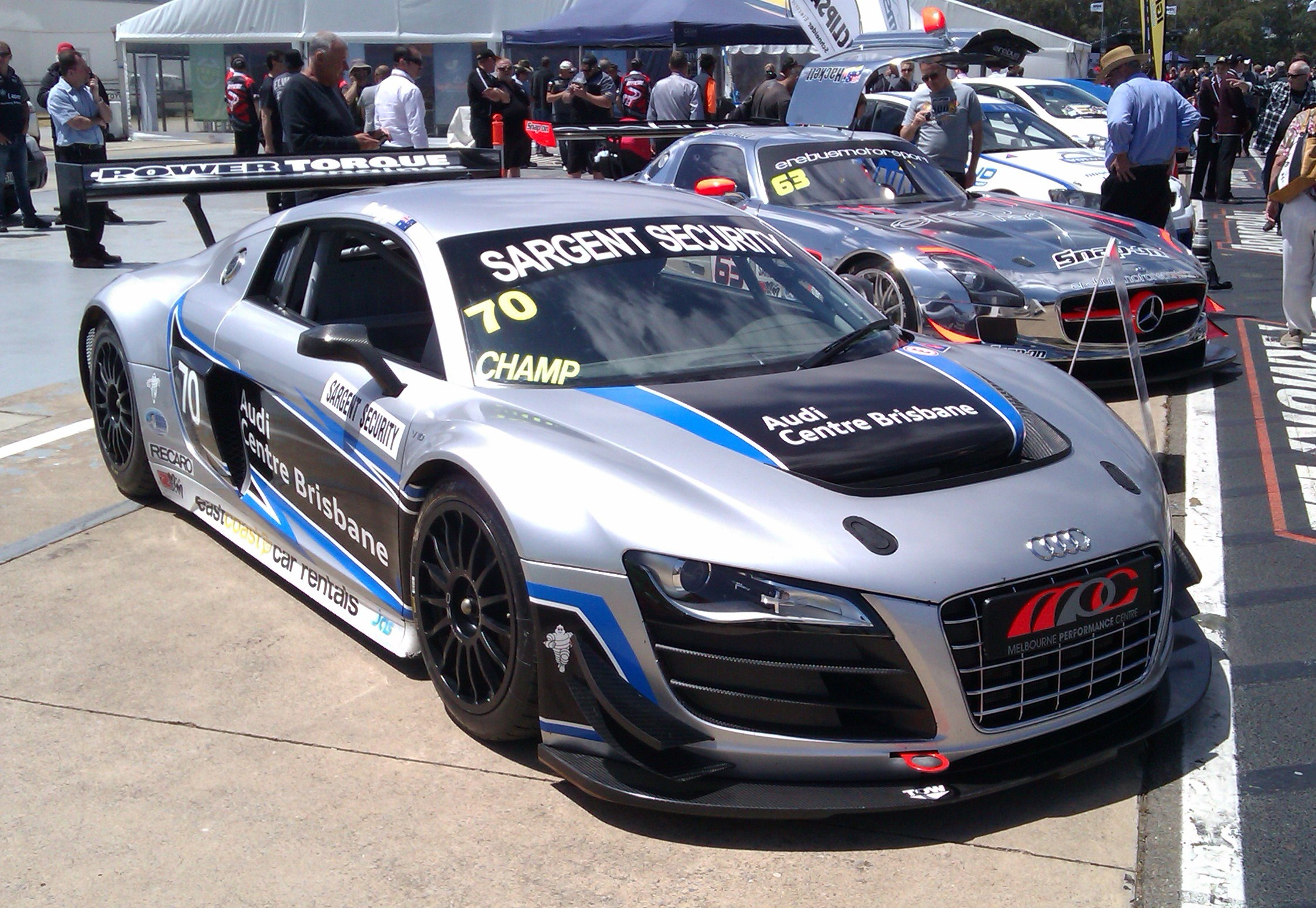
John Briggs (Audi R8 LMS) placed 12th in the GT Championship

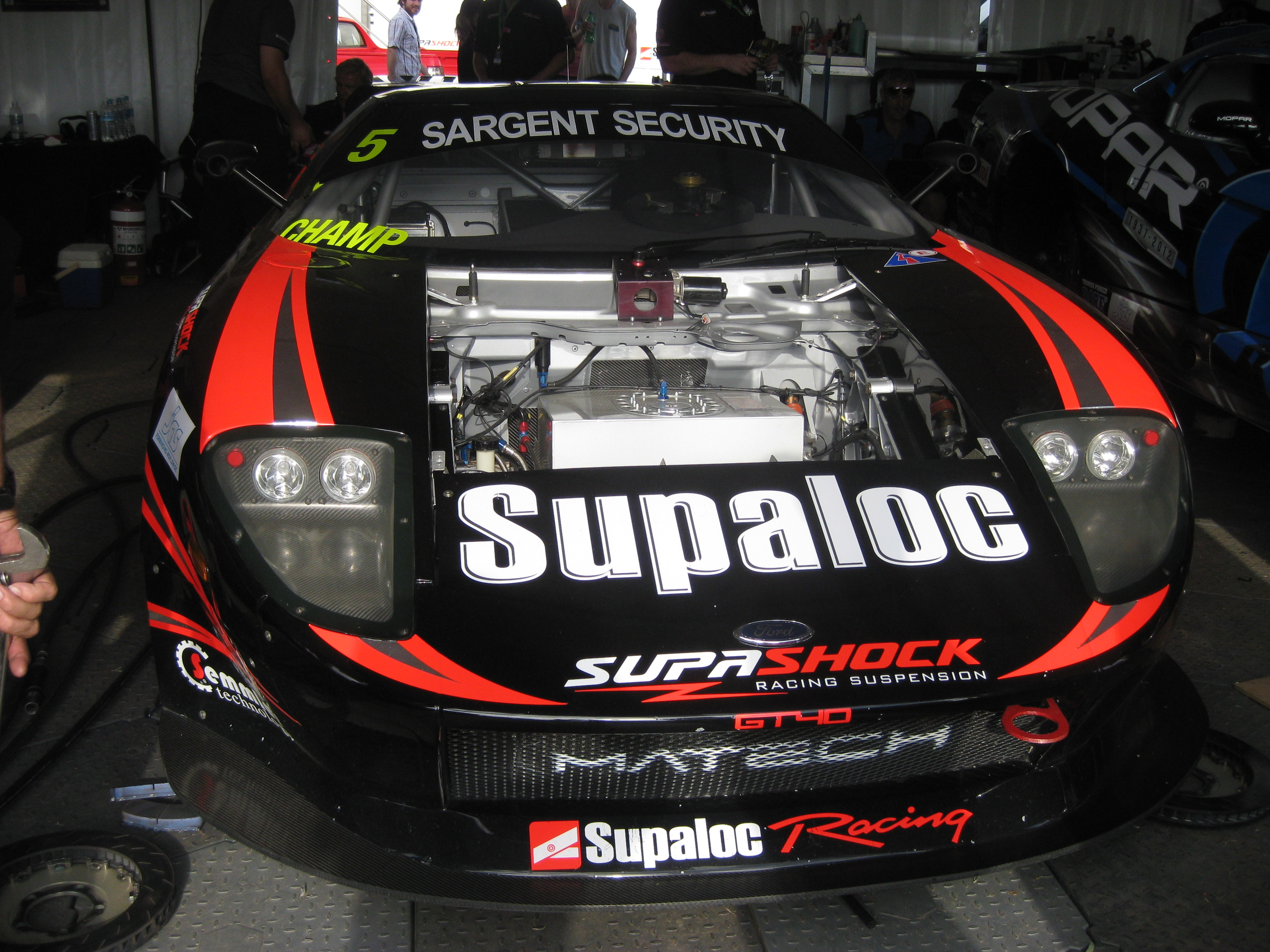
Kevin Weeks (Ford GT) placed 17th in the GT Championship

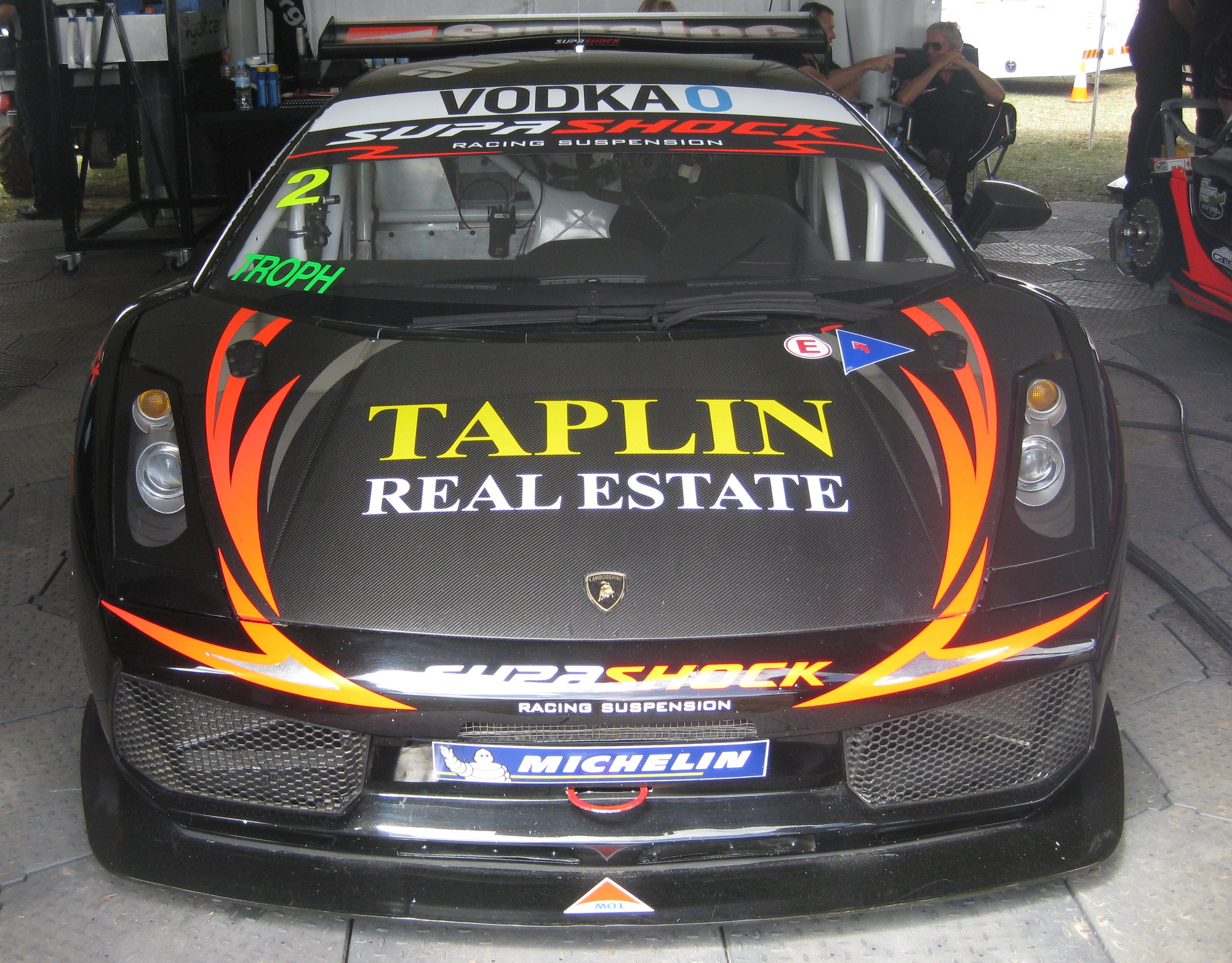
Andrew Taplin (Lamborghini Gallardo) placed second in the GT Trophy

The following teams and drivers contested the 2012 Australian GT Championship.

Driver	Co-driver	Team	No.	Vehicle
GT Championship
(Australia) Mark Eddy	(Australia) Warren Luff		1	Audi R8 LMS
(Australia) Nathan Tinkler		Hunter Motorsports	3	Porsche 997 GT3-R
(Australia) Kevin Weeks	(Australia) Steve Owen	Supaloc Racing	5	Ford GT
(Australia) Rod Salmon			6	Audi R8 LMS
(Australia) Martin Wagg		Eggleston Motorsport	7	Aston Martin DBRS9
(Australia) Peter Edwards	(Denmark) Allan Simonsen (Australia) John Bowe (New Zealand) Jonny Reid	Maranello Motorsport	8; 88	Ferrari 458 GT3
(Australia) Nick O'Halloran	(Denmark) Allan Simonsen (Australia) Cameron McConville	Maranello Motorsport	8	Ferrari 458 GT3
(Australia) Neale Muston		Excalibur Racing	9	Porsche 997 GT3-R
(United Kingdom) Tony Quinn		VIP Petfoods Racing	11	Ferrari 458 GT3; Mosler MT900 GT3
(Australia) Klark Quinn		VIP Petfoods Racing	12	Porsche 997 GT3-R
(Australia) Peter Conroy	(United Kingdom) James Winslow	Peter Conroy Motorsport	14	Audi R8 LMS
(Australia) Ash Samadi	(Australia) Dean Grant	Team ASR	22	Lamborghini Gallardo; Mosler MT900 GT3
(Australia) Roger Lago	(Australia) David Russell	JBS	23	Lamborghini Gallardo
(Australia) Jim Manolios	(Australia) Rod Wilson	Trofeo Motorsport	29	Chevrolet Corvette Z06 GT3R
(Australia) Ben Eggleston		Eggleston Motorsport	38	Aston Martin DBRS9
(Australia) Tony Defelice	(Australia) Renato Loberto	Defelice Homes	49	Ferrari 458 GT3
(Australia) James Brock (Germany) Maro Engel (Germany) Thomas Jäger (Germany) Bernd Schneider		Erebus Racing	62	Mercedes-Benz SLS AMG; Mosler MT900 GT3
(Australia) Peter Hackett		Erebus Racing	63	Mercedes-Benz SLS AMG
(Australia) Paul Morris		Paul Morris Motorsport	67	Aston Martin DBRS9
(Australia) John Briggs		Briggs Motor Sport	70	Mosler MT900 GT3; Audi R8 LMS
(Australia) Greg Crick			75	Dodge Viper Competition
GT Trophy
(Australia) Andrew Taplin		Supaloc Racing	2	Lamborghini Gallardo
(Australia) Ian Palmer		Palmer Promotions	20	Dodge Viper
(Australia) Jordan Ormsby			61	Porsche 997 GT3 Cup
(Australia) Dean Koutsoumidis	(Australia) Andrew McInnes		71	Lamborghini Gallardo
GT Challenge
(Australia) Stephen Grove			4	Porsche 997 GT3 Cup
(Hong Kong) Jacky Yeung		ULX110 Custom Blend Oils	13	Ferrari 360 Challenge
(Australia) Keith Wong	(Australia) Kiang-Kuan Wong	ULX110 Custom Blend Oils	15	Porsche 996 GT3-R
(Australia) Peter Boylan		Boylan Group	21	Porsche 997 GT3 Cup
(Australia) Brendon Cook	(Australia) Matt Kingsley	McElrea Racing	25	Porsche 997 GT3 Cup
(Australia) John Modystach			26	Porsche 997 GT3 Cup
(Australia) Brenton Griguol	(Australia) Cameron Wearing		69	Ferrari 360 Challenge
(Australia) Jan Jinadasa			77	Porsche 997 GT3 Cup
GT Sports
(Australia) Graham Lusty	(Australia) Darrell Dixon	G & D Wheels	24	Nissan GT-R R35
(Australia) Darren Berry	(Australia) Paul Stokell (Papua New Guinea) Keith Kassulke	Williams Race Services	50	Ginetta G50 HC
(Australia) Michael Hovey		ES Australia	73	Ginetta G50

== Race calendar ==
The championship was contested over a seven round series.

Rd.	Circuit	Location / state	Date	Winner			
Rd.	Circuit	Location / state	Date	GT Championship	GT Trophy	GT Challenge	GT Sports
1	Adelaide Street Circuit	Adelaide, South Australia	1–4 March	Klark Quinn	Jordan Ormsby	Jan Jinadasa	Darren Berry
2	Phillip Island Grand Prix Circuit	Phillip Island, Victoria	25–27 May	Greg Crick	Andrew Taplin	Jan Jinadasa	Darren Berry
3	Winton Motor Raceway	Benalla, Victoria	22–24 June	Peter Hackett	Andrew Taplin	Peter Boylan	no entries
4	Sydney Motorsport Park	Sydney, New South Wales	13–15 July	Peter Hackett	Dean Koutsoumidis; Andrew McInnes	Jan Jinadasa	Graham Lusty
5	Phillip Island Grand Prix Circuit	Phillip Island, Victoria	21–23 September	Maro Engel	Dean Koutsoumidis; Andrew McInnes	Rob Knight; Marcus Marshall	no entries
6	Surfers Paradise Street Circuit	Surfers Paradise, Queensland	19–21 October	Klark Quinn	Dean Koutsoumidis; Andrew McInnes	Michael Almond	Darren Berry
7	Homebush Street Circuit	Sydney, New South Wales	30 November–2 December	Bernd Schneider	Dean Koutsoumidis; Andrew McInnes	Scott Taylor	no entries

== Points system ==
Points were awarded in each division for each qualifying session and each race at each round according to the following table. Points were allocated according to positions attained in each division rather than for outright positions.

Position	1st	2nd	3rd	4th	5th	6th	7th	8th	9th	All other finishers
Qualifying	10	8	7	6	5	4	3	2	1	
Races	16	12	9	7	6	5	4	3	2	1

== Championship results ==
Pos.	Driver	Car	Points.
GT Championship
1	Klark Quinn	Porsche GT3-R	186
2	Peter Hackett	Mercedes-Benz SLS GT3	173
3	Peter Edwards / John Bowe	Ferrari 458 Italia GT3	128
4	Nick O'Halloran / Allan Simonsen	Ferrari 458 GT3	56
5	Greg Crick	Dodge Viper Competition Coupe Series II	56
6	Ben Eggleston	Aston Martin DBRS9	54
7	Roger Lago	Lamborghini Gallardo GT3	52
8	Tony Quinn	Ferrari 458 Italia GT3; Mosler	51
9	James Brock	Mercedes-Benz AMG SLS GT3; Mosler	47
10	Rod Salmon	Audi R8 LMS	43
11	Bernd Schneider	Mercedes-Benz AMG SLS GT3	42
12	John Briggs	Mosler MT900 GT3; Audi R8 LMS	35
13	Ash Samadi / Dean Grant	Lamborghini Gallardo GT3; Mosler	34
14	Jim Manolios / Rod Wilson	Corvette ZO6 GT3R	22
15	Martin Wagg	Aston Martin DBRS9	18
16	Peter Conroy	Audi R8 LMS	17
17	Kevin Weeks	Ford GT3	15
18	Thomas Jäger	Mercedes-Benz SLS GT3	15
19	Mark Eddy / Warren Luff	Audi R8 LMS	15
20	Paul Morris	Aston Martin DBRS9	13
21	Tony Defelice / Renato Loberto	Ferrari 458 GT3	9
22	John Bowe / Peter Edwards	Ferrari 458 Italia GT3	0
23	David Russell	Lamborghini Gallardo GT3	0
24	Dean Grant / Ash Samadi	Lamborghini Gallardo GT3	0
GT Trophy
1	Dean Koutsoumidis / Andrew McInnes	Lamborghini Gallardo GT3	255
2	Andrew Taplin	Lamborghini Gallardo GT3	99
3	Jordan Ormsby	Porsche 997 GT3 Cup Car	40
4	Ian Palmer	Dodge Viper Competition Coupe Series II	31
5	Marc Cini	Porsche GT3 997 Cup S	26
GT Challenge
1	Jan Jinadasa	Porsche 997 GT3 Cup Car	179
2	Peter Boylan	Porsche 997 GT3 Cup Car	93
3	Rob Knight	Porsche 911 GT3	66
4	Brenton Griguol	Ferrari 360 Challenge	45
5	John Modystach	Porsche 997 GT3 Cup Car	43
6	Michael Almond	Porsche 997 GT3 Cup Car	40
7	Brendon Cook	Porsche 997 GT3 Cup Car	31
8	Keith Wong / Kiang-Kuan Wong	Porsche GT3 R	30
9	Stephen Grove	Porsche 997 GT3 Cup Car	20
10	Nicolas McBride	Porsche 997 GT3 Cup Car	20
11	Ben Foessel	Porsche 996 GT3 R	16
12	Jacky Yeung	Ferrari 360 Challenge	12
13	Nathan Tinkler	Porsche 997 GT3 Cup Car	3
14	Matthew Kingsley	Porsche 997 GT3 Cup Car	0
GT Sports
1	Darren Berry	Ginetta G50 GT4	112
2	Michael Hovey	Ginetta G50 GT4	29
3	Graham Lusty / Darrell Dixon	Nissan GT-R R3	0

== 2012 Australian Tourist Trophy ==
The 2012 Australian Tourist Trophy was awarded by the Confederation of Australian Motor Sport to the driver accumulating the highest aggregate points total from the Phillip Island and Sydney Motorsport Park rounds of the Australian GT Championship. The title, which was the 23rd Australian Tourist Trophy, was won by Peter Hackett driving a Mercedes-Benz SLS AMG GT3.
