= 2005 Australian Formula 4000 Championship =

The 2005 Australian Formula 4000 Championship was a CAMS sanctioned motor racing title for drivers of Formula 4000 racing cars.

This was the first title to be contested under the Australian Formula 4000 Championship name although the category had competed for the Australian Drivers' Championship under its previous Formula Holden and Formula Brabham names from 1989 to 2002 and then as Formula 4000 in 2003 and 2004.

== Calendar ==
The title was contested over a six-round series with two races per round.

- Round 1, Phillip Island Grand Prix Circuit, Victoria, 20–22 May
- Round 2, Queensland Raceway, Ipswich, Queensland, 1–3 July
- Round 3, Eastern Creek International Raceway, New South Wales, 22–24 July
- Round 4, Phillip Island Grand Prix Circuit, Victoria, 19–21 August
- Round 5, Oran Park Raceway, New South Wales, 16–18 September
- Round 6, Wakefield Park, New South Wales, 11–13 November

== Points system ==
Championship points were awarded on a 20-15-12-10-8-6-4-3-2-1 basis to the top ten finishers in each race. A bonus point was allocated to the driver setting pole position at each round and to the driver achieving the fastest lap in each race.

== Results ==
Pos	Driver	No.	Car	Entrant	R1/Q	R1/R1	R1/R2	R2/Q	R2/R1	R2/R2	R3/Q	R3/R1	R3/R2	R4/Q	R4/R1	R4/R2	R5/Q	R5/R1	R5/R2	R6/Q	R6/R1	R6/R2	Total
1	Peter Hackett	1	Reynard 96D Holden	Ralt Australia	-	-	-	-	12	20	1	20	21	-	21	21	1	20	21	1	21	21	201
2	Ty Hanger	48	Reynard 95D Holden	Pluim Interiors	1	12	-	1	21	16	-	16	15	1	15	15	-	16	15	-	15	15	174
3	Derek Pingel	8	Reynard 95D Holden	Aust Lifestyle Management	-	15	15	-	15	12	-	8	10	-	8	12	-	-	-	-	15	12	122
4	Ben Crighton	2	Reynard 95D Holden	Ralt Australia	-	8	12	-	6	10	-	-	-	-	10	-	-	10	10	-	-	-	66
5	Terry Clearihan	27	Reynard 92D Holden	NNS / Braddon Automart	-	10	-	-	10	-	-	10	4	-	-	-	-	4	8	-	6	-	52
6	Les Crampton	74	Reynard 97D Holden	Hocking Motorsport	-	6	-	-	-	-	-	3	8	-	4	8	-	-	-	-	8	6	43
7	Neil McFadyen	1	Reynard 96D Holden	John Herman	-	21	21	-	-	-	-	-	-	-	-	-	-	-	-	-	-	-	42
8	Mark West	50	Reynard 98D Holden	Just Parts Magazine	-	-	-	-	-	-	-	-	-	-	6	-	-	8	3	-	-	10	27
9	Ash Lowe	18	Lola T93-50 Holden	Archerfield Speed Karts	-	-	-	-	-	-	-	12	12	-	-	-	-	-	-	-	-	-	24
	Christian Murchison	74	Reynard 97D Holden	Hocking Motorsport	-	-	-	-	-	-	-	-	-	-	-	-	-	12	12	-	-	-	24
11	Sam Dale	12	Reynard 94D Holden	Mumbo Racing	-	-	-	-	-	8	-	6	2	-	-	-	-	-	-	-	-	8	24
12	Stephen Borness	17	Reynard 96D Holden	Mantis Racing	-	-	-	-	-	-	-	-	-	-	-	-	-	3	6	-	10	4	23
13	Ricky Occhipinti	32	Reynard 97D Holden	Ricky Occhipinti	-	-	-	-	-	-	-	-	-	-	12	10	-	-	-	-	-	-	22
14	Chris Farrell	17	Reynard 96D Holden	Mantis Racing	-	-	-	-	4	6	-	4	6	-	-	-	-	-	-	-	-	-	20
15	Ray Hanger	44	Reynard 92D Holden	Ray Hanger	-	4	-	-	-	4	-	2	3	-	-	-	-	-	-	-	-	-	13
16	Bob Muir	77	Reynard 94D Holden	Guardian Loan	-	-	-	-	-	-	-	-	-	-	-	-	-	6	4	-	-	-	10
17	Bob Power	48	Ralt RT23 Holden	NJIS Party Hire	-	-	-	-	8	-	-	-	-	-	-	-	-	-	-	-	-	-	8
18	Matthew Fox	24	Reynard 91D Holden	Mumbo Racing	-	-	-	-	-	-	-	-	-	-	-	-	-	-	-	-	4	3	7
19	Brendan Julius	24	Reynard Holden	Mumbo Racing	-	-	-	-	-	-	-	-	-	-	-	-	-	2	2	-	-	-	4
20	Mark Ellis	17	Reynard 96D Holden	Christopher Farrell	-	-	-	-	-	-	-	-	-	-	3	-	-	-	-	-	-	-	3
