= 2003 Australian Formula 3 Championship =

Motor racing competition

Seasons
- ← 2002 2004 →

The 2003 Australian Formula 3 Championship was an Australian motor racing competition open to Formula 3 cars. It was organised and administered by Formula 3 Australia Inc and was recognised by the Confederation of Australian Motor Sport as a National Championship. Contested over an eight-round series, it was the third Australian Formula 3 Championship.

Michael Caruso won the drivers title from Barton Mawer and James Cressy.

== Calendar ==
The championship was contested over an eight-round series with two races per round.

Round	Circuit	State	Date
1	Adelaide Parklands Circuit	South Australia	22–23 March
2	Symmons Plains International Raceway	Tasmania	27 April
3	Wakefield Park	New South Wales	1 June
4	Queensland Raceway	Queensland	15 June
5	Phillip Island Grand Prix Circuit	Victoria	10 August
6	Oran Park Grand Prix Circuit	New South Wales	13 July
7	Winton Motor Raceway	Victoria	21 September
8	Wakefield Park	New South Wales	9 November

== Points system ==
Points towards the Australian Formula 3 Championship were awarded on a 20–15–12–10–8–6–4–3–2–1 basis at each race. One point was awarded to the driver gaining pole position for each race and one point was awarded to the driver setting the fastest race lap in each race. Points towards the Yokohama Formula 3 Australia Trophy were awarded on a similar basis.

Points towards the Australian Formula 3 Engine Manufacturers Championship were awarded on a 20–15–12–10–8–6–4–3–2–1 basis at each race with the first engine of each manufacturer home scoring the equivalent number of points as per the position of the driver. Points towards the Yokohama Formula 3 Australia Engine Manufacturers Trophy were awarded on a similar basis.

== Results ==
=== 2003 Australian Formula 3 Championship ===
					Adelaide		Symmons Pls.		Wakefield Pk.		Queensland Rwy.		Oran Pk.		Phillip Is.		Winton		Wakefield Pk.		Total
Position	Driver	No.	Car	Entrant	R1	R2	R1	R2	R1	R2	R1	R2	R1	R2	R1	R2	R1	R2	R1	R2	
1	Michael Caruso	2	Dallara 301 Fiat Novamotor	Michael Caruso	20	–	12	20	20	22	20	16	16	21	3	–	16	14	13	21	234
2	Barton Mawer	33	Dallara 396 Holden Spiess	Bob Johns	13	12	15	6	16	12	16	20	21	13	15	21	10	10	21	10	231
3	James Cressey	50	Dallara 301 Holden Spiess	Starion Enterprises	11	21	22	14	2	4	12	12	–	15	21	15	21	20	10	–	200
4	Christian Jones	16	Dallara 301 Mugen Honda	Toll Ipec	8	16	8	10	12	15	4	8	12	8	4	10	6	4	15	15	155
5	Peter Hackett	9; 27; 9	Dallara 301 Renault Sodemo; Dallara 301 Alfa Romeo Novamotor; Dallara 399 Renault Sodemo	Glen Coombs; Rudolf Masi; Glen Coombs	–	–	6	15	9	10	11	10	8	10	–	–	8	2	8	8	105
6	Karl Reindler	19	Dallara 301 Holden Spiess	Bronte Rundle	4	2	2	–	6	8	8	4	10	3	12	12	12	15	–	–	98
7	Matt Fitzgerald	8	Dallara 301 Holden Spiess	Bronte Rundle	6	10	4	3	3	–	3	6	6	4	6	8	–	–	–	–	59
8	Alan Gurr	27	Dallara 301 Alfa Romeo Novamotor	Piccola Scuderia Corse	15	8	10	–	10	6	–	–	–	–	–	–	–	–	–	–	49
9	Kenny Habul	75	Dallara 301 Alfa Romeo Novamotor	Piccola Scuderia Corse	2	4	1	4	–	2	2	2	–	–	10	4	–	8	6	4	49
10	Darren Palmer	4	Dallara 301 Holden Spiess	Bronte Rundle	3	6	3	8	4	3	6	4	–	–	–	–	–	–	–	–	37
11	Marchy Lee	5 & 96	Dallara 301 Renault Sodemo	Race Torque International	–	–	–	–	–	–	–	–	4	6	9	6	–	–	–	–	25
12	Maher Algadrie	70	Dallara 301 Mugen Honda	PHR Scuderia	1	–	–	2	–	–	–	1	–	–	1	–	3	6	3	1	18
13	Ian Dyk	8	Dallara 301 Holden Spiess	Bronte Rundle	–	–	–	–	–	–	–	–	–	–	–	–	–	13	4	6	13
14	Aaron Caratti	82	Dallara 301 Renault Sodemo	Race Torque International	–	–	–	–	–	–	–	–	–	–	–	–	1	–	4	6	11
15	Craig Rundle	3 & 4	Dallara 301 Holden Spiess	Bronte Rundle	–	3	–	–	–	–	–	–	–	–	3	–	4	–	–	–	10
16	Bevan Carrick	60	Dallara 397 TOM'S Toyota; Dallara 398 TOM'S Toyota	Cooltemp Pty Ltd	–	–	–	–	–	–	–	–	–	–	–	–	2	3	2	3	10
17	Jonathon Chan	22	Dallara 301 Renault Sodemo	Race Torque International	–	–	–	–	–	–	–	–	2	2	–	2	–	–	–	–	6
18	Damien White	27	Dallara 301 Alfa Romeo Novamotor	IMB / Cactus Group	–	–	–	–	–	–	–	–	–	–	2	3	–	–	–	–	5
19	Michael Navybox	27	Dallara 301 Alfa Romeo Novamotor	Rudolf Masi	–	–	–	–	–	–	–	–	–	–	–	–	–	–	1	2	3
20	Paul Trengove	34	Dallara 301	Bill Maddocks	–	1	–	–	–	–	–	–	–	–	–	–	–	–	–	–	1
=	Jeffrey Lee	7	Dallara 301 Renault Sodemo	Race Torque International	–	–	–	–	–	–	–	–	–	–	–	1	–	–	–	–	1

=== Yokohama Formula 3 Australia Trophy ===
					Adelaide		Symmons Pls.		Wakefield Pk.		Queensland Rwy.		Oran Pk.		Phillip Is.		Winton		Wakefield Pk.		Total
Position	Driver	No.	Car	Entrant	R1	R2	R1	R2	R1	R2	R1	R2	R1	R2	R1	R2	R1	R2	R1	R2	
1	David Borg	32	Dallara 396 Fiat Novamotor	Sam Astuti	–	–	20	15	1	10	8	20	12	12	11	12	12	15	15	20	183
2	Chris Coombs	6	Dallara 396 Mugen Honda	Carrier Airconditioning	20	15	11	22	13	16	10	12	6	–	15	6	–	10	12	15	183
3	Bill Maddocks	88	Dallara 396 TOM'S Toyota	Softelm Mowing Contractors	12	13	1	10	21	12	15	8	10	10	21	15	–	12	10	13	183
4	Chris Gilmour	87	Dallara 396 TOM'S Toyota	Bill Maddocks	–	–	–	–	–	–	22	17	17	22	–	–	22	22	22	1	145
5	Graeme Holmes	21	Dallara 396 Fiat Novamotor	Graeme Holmes	17	21	–	–	–	–	12	–	20	15	–	21	15	–	–	–	121
6	David Choon	11	Dallara 395 Mugen Honda	Supreme Mowers	10	10	15	12	15	20	–	–	–	–	–	–	10	8	8	–	108
7	Rod Anderson	37	Dallara 396 TOM'S Toyota	Hack, Anderson & Thomas	8	–	12	6	–	–	6	10	8	8	12	8	8	6	–	–	84
8	John Boothman	12	Dallara 396 Fiat Novamotor	John Boothman	–	8	–	8	–	–	–	–	4	–	–	4	–	–	–	–	24
9	Ben Porter	87	Dallara 396 TOM'S Toyota	Softelm Mowing Contractors	–	–	–	–	–	–	–	–	–	–	8	10	–	–	–	–	18

The Yokohama Formula 3 Australia Trophy was open to cars constructed prior to 31 December 1996.

=== Australian Formula 3 Engine Manufacturers Championship ===
		Adelaide		Symmons Pls.		Wakefield Pk.		Queensland Rwy.		Oran Pk.		Phillip Is.		Winton		Wakefield Pk.		Total
Position	Manufacturer	R1	R2	R1	R2	R1	R2	R1	R2	R1	R2	R1	R2	R1	R2	R1	R2	
1	Holden Spiess	12	20	20	12	15	12	15	20	20	15	20	20	20	20	20	12	273
2	Fiat Novamotor	20	–	12	20	20	20	20	15	15	20	3	–	15	12	12	20	224
3	Mugen Honda	8	15	8	10	12	15	4	8	12	8	4	10	6	6	15	15	156
4	Renault Sodemo	–	–	6	15	8	10	10	10	8	10	8	6	1	–	8	8	108
5	Alfa Romeo Novamotor	15	8	10	4	10	6	2	2	–	–	10	4	8	8	6	4	97
6	TOM'S Toyota	–	1	–	–	–	–	–	–	–	–	–	–	2	3	–	–	6

=== Yokohama Formula 3 Australia Engine Manufacturers Trophy ===
		Adelaide		Symmons Pls.		Wakefield Pk.		Queensland Rwy.		Oran Pk.		Phillip Is.		Winton		Wakefield Pk.		Total
Position	Manufacturer	R1	R2	R1	R2	R1	R2	R1	R2	R1	R2	R1	R2	R1	R2	R1	R2	
1	(Japan) TOM'S Toyota	12	12	12	10	20	12	20	15	15	20	20	15	20	20	20	12	255
2	(Japan) Mugen Honda	20	15	15	20	15	20	10	12	6		15	6	10	10	12	15	201
3	(Italy) Fiat Astuti			20	15		10	8	20	12	12	10	12	12	15	15	20	181
4	(Italy) Fiat Novamotor	15	20					12		20	15		20	15				117
