= 2001 Australian Formula 3 Championship =

Seasons
- ← 2000 2002 →

The 2001 Australian Formula 3 Championship was a CAMS sanctioned motor racing title for drivers of Formula 3 racing cars. It was the first Australian Formula 3 Championship, with that title replacing the previous "Formula 3 National Series". The inaugural championship was won by Peter Hackett driving a Dallara F398 Alfa Romeo.

== Team and drivers ==
Team	Chassis	Engine	No.	Driver	Rounds
Piccola Scuderia Corsa	Dallara F398	Alfa Romeo	2	(Australia) Peter Hackett	All
BRM Motorsport	Dallara F398	Opel Spiess	4	(Australia) Darren Palmer	All
BRM Motorsport	Dallara F398	Opel Spiess	20	(New Zealand) Daynom Templeman	1-6
Coombs Racing	Dallara F396	Mugen Honda	6	(Australia) Glenn Coombs	All
Coombs Racing	Dallara F395/6	TOM'S Toyota	22	(Australia) Chris Coombs	All
Titan Racing	Dallara F395/6	TOM'S Toyota	7	(Australia) Damien Digby	1-6
Supreme Mowers	Dallara F396	Mugen Honda	11	(Australia) David Choon	All
John Boothman	Dallara F390	Alfa Romeo	12	(Australia) John Boothman	All
Douglas Racing	Dallara F396	Fiat	13	(Australia) Fred Douglas	All
M Speed Racing	Dallara F398	TOM'S Toyota	14	(Australia) Mike Beeley	All
Graeme Holmes	Reynard 913	Volkswagen	21	(Australia) Graeme Holmes	All
Racing Car Heaven	Dallara F396	TOM'S Toyota	87	(Australia) Chas Jacobsen	All
Racing Car Heaven	Dallara F396	TOM'S Toyota	88	(Australia) James Manderson	1, 7
Level 2
Mike Beeley	Reynard 903	Alfa Romeo	15	(Australia) Craig Smith	1, 5
Frank Cascone	Dallara F391	Alfa Romeo	27	(Australia) Frank Cascone	All
Bill Maddocks	Richards 201B	Volkswagen	35	(Australia) Bill Maddocks	All
Level 2 26mm
Motor Improvements	Reynard 923	Honda	5	(Australia) Peter Rees	All
Rod Anderson	Reynard 893	Volkswagen	37	(Australia) Rod Anderson	3, 5-7

== Calendar ==
The championship was contested over a seven-round series with two races per round.

Round	Circuit	State	Date	Round winner
1	Oran Park	New South Wales	17–18 March	James Manderson
2	Wakefield Park	New South Wales	6 May	Peter Hackett
3	Phillip Island	Victoria	26–27 May	
4	Queensland Raceway	Queensland	22 July	Peter Hackett
5	Eastern Creek	New South Wales	19 August	
6	Sandown	Victoria	15 September	
7	Oran Park	New South Wales	25 November	Darren Palmer

== Season summary ==
Rd	Race	Circuit	Pole position	Fastest lap	Winning driver	Winning team	Round Winner
1	1	(New South Wales) Oran Park Raceway	(Australia) Darren Palmer	(Australia) Peter Hackett	(Australia) Peter Hackett	Piccola Scuderia Corsa	(Australia) Peter Hackett
1	2	(New South Wales) Oran Park Raceway		(New Zealand) Daynom Templeman	(Australia) Peter Hackett	Piccola Scuderia Corsa	(Australia) Peter Hackett
2	1	(New South Wales) Wakefield Park Raceway					
2	2	(New South Wales) Wakefield Park Raceway					
3	1	(Victoria (state)) Phillip Island Grand Prix Circuit	(Australia) Peter Hackett	(Australia) Peter Hackett	(Australia) Peter Hackett	Piccola Scuderia Corsa	(Australia) Peter Hackett
3	2	(Victoria (state)) Phillip Island Grand Prix Circuit		(Australia) Darren Palmer	(Australia) Peter Hackett	Piccola Scuderia Corsa	(Australia) Peter Hackett
4	1	Queensland Raceway	(Australia) Peter Hackett	(Australia) Peter Hackett	(Australia) Peter Hackett	Piccola Scuderia Corsa	(Australia) Peter Hackett
4	2	Queensland Raceway		(Australia) Peter Hackett	(Australia) Peter Hackett	Piccola Scuderia Corsa	(Australia) Peter Hackett
5	1	(New South Wales) Eastern Creek International Raceway	(Australia) Peter Hackett	(Australia) Darren Palmer	(Australia) Peter Hackett	Piccola Scuderia Corsa	(Australia) Peter Hackett
5	2	(New South Wales) Eastern Creek International Raceway		(New Zealand) Daynom Templeman	(New Zealand) Daynom Templeman	BRM Motorsport	(Australia) Peter Hackett
6	1	(Victoria (state)) Sandown Raceway	(New Zealand) Daynom Templeman	(New Zealand) Daynom Templeman	(Australia) Darren Palmer	BRM Motorsport	(New Zealand) Daynom Templeman (Australia) Darren Palmer
6	2	(Victoria (state)) Sandown Raceway		(Australia) Darren Palmer	(New Zealand) Daynom Templeman	BRM Motorsport	(New Zealand) Daynom Templeman (Australia) Darren Palmer
7	1	(New South Wales) Oran Park Raceway	(Australia) Darren Palmer	(Australia) Darren Palmer	(Australia) Peter Hackett	Piccola Scuderia Corsa	(Australia) Peter Hackett (Australia) Darren Palmer
7	2	(New South Wales) Oran Park Raceway		(Australia) Peter Hackett	(Australia) Darren Palmer	BRM Motorsport	(Australia) Peter Hackett (Australia) Darren Palmer

== Points system ==
Championship points were awarded on a 20-15-12-10-8-6-4-3-2- basis to the first ten finishers in the Championship class at each race. One bonus point was awarded to the driver setting pole position for each race and a point was also awarded to the driver setting the fastest race lap in each race.

Class points were awarded on a 20-15-12-10-8-6-4-3-2- basis to the first ten class finishers at each race.

== Results ==
Pos.	Driver	ORA		WAK		PHI		QUE		SYD		SAN		ORA		Pts.
1	Peter Hackett	21	10	21	17	22	21	22	22	21	12	-	12	20	17	238
2	Darren Palmer	12	13	-	12	15	16	1	15	13	15	20	16	17	20	185
3	Daynom Templeman	11	16	1	20	12	12	15	12	-	22	17	21	-	-	159
4	Mike Beeley	6	6	15	-	10	10	12	10	15	10	12	6	-	10	122
5	Chris Coombs	-	3	12	10	6	6	10	6	8	8	3	-	10	1	83
6	Damien Digby	4	8	10	-	8	8	6	3	10	4	10	2	-	-	73
7	James Manderson	15	20	-	-	-	-	-	-	-	-	-	-	12	6	53
8	Glenn Coombs	-	-	8	6	4	-	2	4	-	-	6	8	4	3	45
9	Graeme Holmes	3	4	-	8	3	4	-	-	-	-	4	-	6	6	38
10	David Choon	-	2	-	-	2	4	-	-	1	2	8	3	8	8	38
11	Chas Jacobsen	8	-	-	-	-	-	-	-	6	3	2	4	-	4	27
12	John Boothman	2	-	-	4	-	2	4	2	4	1	-	-	3	2	24
13	Fred Douglas	1	-	6	-	1	3	3	-	-	-	1	1	1	-	17
Level 2
1	Frank Cascone	-	-	20	15	15	20	20	20	20	20	20	20	-	-	190
2	Bill Maddocks	-	15	-	-	20	15	15	15	15	15	15	15	15	15	170
3	Craig Smith	20	20	-	-	-	-	-	-	3	6	-	-	-	-	49
Level 2 26mm
1	Peter Rees	-	20	20	-	20	20	-	20	20	-	20	20	20	20	200
2	Rod Anderson	-	-	-	-	15	15	-	-	15	-	-	15	15	15	90
