= 2002 Australian Formula 3 Championship =

Motor racing competition

2002 Australian Formula 3 season

Seasons
- ← 2001 2003 →

The 2002 Australian Formula 3 Championship was a CAMS sanctioned national motor racing title for drivers of Racing Cars complying with FIA Formula 3 regulations. Eligibility was restricted to cars constructed outside of Australia between 1 January 1995 and 31 December 2001. The title was contested over an eight round series with two races per round.

- Round 1, Adelaide Parklands, South Australia, 15–17 March
- Round 2, Symmons Plains, Tasmania, 5–7 April
- Round 3, Oran Park, New South Wales, 10–12 May
- Round 4, Winton, Victoria, 21–23 June
- Round 5, Wakefield Park, New South Wales, 9–11 August
- Round 6, Sandown, Victoria, 6–8 September
- Round 7, Phillip Island, Victoria, 20–22 September
- Round 8, Gold Coast, Queensland, 24–27 October

Points were awarded on a 20-15-12-10-8-6-4-3-2-1 basis to the first ten finishers in each race with an additional point awarded for both the fastest qualifying time for each race and the fastest lap of each race. An additional contest, the National Series, was run concurrently with the Australian Formula 3 Championship but was restricted to Level 2 cars, i.e. cars constructed within Australia and cars constructed outside of Australia between 1 January 1989 and 31 December 1994. Points were awarded in the same manner as for the Australian Formula 3 Championship.

== Results ==
| Position | Driver | No. | Car | Entrant | Rd 1 | | Rd 2 | | Rd 3 | | Rd 4 | | Rd 5 | | Rd 6 | | Rd 7 | | Rd 8 | | Total |
|---|---|---|---|---|---|---|---|---|---|---|---|---|---|---|---|---|---|---|---|---|---|
| Position | Driver | No. | Car | Entrant | R1 | R2 | R1 | R2 | R1 | R2 | R1 | R2 | R1 | R2 | R1 | R2 | R1 | R2 | R1 | R2 | Total |
| 1 | James Manderson | 8 | Dallara F301 Opel Spiess | Team BRM | 15 | 20 | 21 | 16 | 15 | 16 | 8 | 8 | 10 | 22 | 11 | 21 | 22 | 21 | 15 | - | 241 |
| 2 | Will Power | 60 | Dallara F397 TOM's Toyota; Dallara F398 TOM's Toyota; Dallara F301 Mugen Honda | Cooltemp Pty Ltd | - | - | - | - | 22 | 21 | 22 | 21 | 15 | 15 | 7 | 11 | 15 | 12 | 22 | 21 | 204 |
| 3 | Darren Palmer | 4 | Dallara F301 Opel Spiess | Team BRM | 21 | 13 | 8 | 12 | 12 | 12 | 12 | 12 | 6 | 6 | 20 | 15 | 12 | 15 | 10 | - | 186 |
| 4 | James Cressey | 50; 55 | Dallara F300 Opel Spiess | Piccolo Scuderia Corse; Starion Team Peugeot | 7 | 16 | 13 | 20 | 4 | 10 | 6 | 10 | 12 | 12 | - | - | 10 | 11 | 4 | 8 | 143 |
| 5 | Michael Caruso | 2 | Dallara F301 Fiat | Nova Veloce | - | - | - | - | - | - | 15 | 15 | 9 | 8 | 12 | 8 | - | - | 8 | 16 | 91 |
| 6 | Peter Hackett | 1 | Dallara F301 Alfa Romeo | Fisher & Paykel / Cactus Group | - | - | - | - | - | - | - | - | 21 | 10 | 15 | 12 | 8 | 8 | - | 12 | 86 |
| 7 | Ricky Occhipinti | 32 | Dallara F396 Fiat | Formula Uno Racing | 2 | - | - | - | 8 | 3 | 2 | 6 | 3 | 3 | 8 | 6 | 6 | 4 | 2 | 3 | 56 |
| 8 | Matt Fitzgerald | 14; 3 | Dallara F398 TOM's Toyota; Dallara F398 Speiss Opel | MSpeed Racing; RGP Racing | - | - | 16 | - | 10 | 8 | - | - | 2 | - | - | - | 3 | 3 | 6 | - | 48 |
| 9 | Paul Stephenson | 7 | Dallara F395/6 TOM's Toyota | ebanktrade | - | - | - | - | - | - | 10 | 4 | 4 | 4 | 4 | - | 4 | 6 | 3 | 4 | 43 |
| 10 | Chris Coombs | 22 | Dallara F395/6 TOM's Toyota | Daikin Australia | 10 | 10 | 4 | 6 | - | - | 3 | - | - | - | 2 | - | - | - | - | 2 | 37 |
| 11 | Mike Beeley | 15 | Dallara F398 TOM's Toyota | MSpeed Racing | 12 | 8 | 10 | - | - | 6 | - | - | - | - | - | - | - | - | - | - | 36 |
| 12 | Graham Holmes | 21 | Dallara F396 Novamotor Fiat | GKH Powdercoating | 8 | 4 | - | - | - | - | - | 1 | 1 | 2 | - | 3 | 1 | 2 | 1 | 1 | 24 |
| 13 | Glen Coombs | 6 | Dallara F396 Mugen Honda | Carrier Airconditioning | 4 | 6 | 6 | - | - | - | - | 2 | - | - | - | 2 | - | 1 | - | - | 21 |
| 14 | Jeffrey Brewer | 9 | Dallara F301 Alfa Romeo | Piccolo Scuderia Corse | - | 2 | - | 8 | 6 | 4 | - | - | - | - | - | - | - | - | - | - | 20 |
| 15 | Justin Watt | 56 | Dallara F301 Alfa Romeo | Fisher & Paykel / Cactus Group | - | - | - | - | - | - | 4 | 1 | - | - | - | - | 2 | - | - | 10 | 17 |
| 16 | John Boothman | 12 | Dallara F396 Fiat | John Boothman | - | 1 | 3 | 10 | - | - | - | - | - | - | 1 | 1 | - | - | - | - | 16 |
| 17 | Mark Rundle | 3 | Dallara F398 Opel Spiess | RGP Motorsport | - | 3 | - | - | - | - | 1 | 3 | - | - | 3 | 4 | - | - | - | - | 14 |
| 18 | Barton Mawer | 33 | Dallara F396 Opel Spiess | Bob John | - | - | - | - | - | - | - | - | - | - | - | - | - | - | 12 | - | 12 |
| 19 | Christian Jones | 16 | Dallara F301 Mugen Honda | Toll Ipec | - | - | - | - | - | - | - | - | - | - | - | - | - | - | - | 6 | 6 |
| 20 | Sean Whelan | 20 | Dallara F396 Opel Spiess | Bronte Rundle | 3 | - | - | - | - | - | - | - | - | - | - | - | - | - | - | - | 3 |
| 21 | David Borg | 3 | Dallara F398 Opel Spiess | RGP Motorsport | - | - | - | - | - | - | - | - | - | 1 | - | - | - | - | - | - | 1 |
National Series (for Level 2 Cars)
| 1 | Paul Trengove | 34 | Dallara F390 Alfa Romeo | CPA Australia | 12 | - | - | - | 20 | 15 | 12 | 20 | 20 | 20 | 20 | 20 | 20 | - | 20 | 20 | 219 |
| 2 | Rod Anderson | 37 | Reynard 893 Volkswagen | Hack Anderson & Thomas | 20 | - | 20 | 20 | 15 | 20 | 20 | 15 | - | - | 15 | 15 | 12 | 20 | - | - | 192 |
| 3 | Bill Maddocks | 35 | Dallara F389 Volkswagen | Softelm Pty Ltd | 10 | 12 | - | 15 | - | - | 15 | 12 | - | 15 | 12 | 12 | 15 | 15 | 15 | 15 | 163 |
| 4 | Peter Rees | 5 | Reynard 923 Honda | Peter Rees | 15 | 15 | - | - | - | - | - | - | - | - | - | - | - | - | - | - | 30 |
| 5 | Andrew Weber | 49 | Reynard 903 Alfa Romeo | Andrew Weber | 8 | 20 | - | - | - | - | - | - | - | - | - | - | - | - | - | - | 28 |
| 6 | Neil Caswell | 99 | Reynard 923 Honda | Total Recruitment | - | - | - | - | 12 | 12 | - | - | - | - | - | - | - | - | - | - | 24 |
| 7 | Frank Cascone | 27 | Dallara F391 Alfa Romeo | Frank Cascone | 6 | 10 | - | - | - | - | - | - | - | - | - | - | - | - | - | - | 16 |
