= 2024 GT World Challenge Australia =

Australian motorsport championship season

The 2024 Fanatec GT World Challenge Australia Powered by AWS was an Australian motor sport competition for GT cars. This was the first season of the championship being solely managed by the SRO Motorsports Group. The season began on 18 February at the Bathurst 12 Hour at Mount Panorama Circuit, which formed the first of two Endurance Cup events in the season, and ended on 10 November, also at Mount Panorama Circuit.

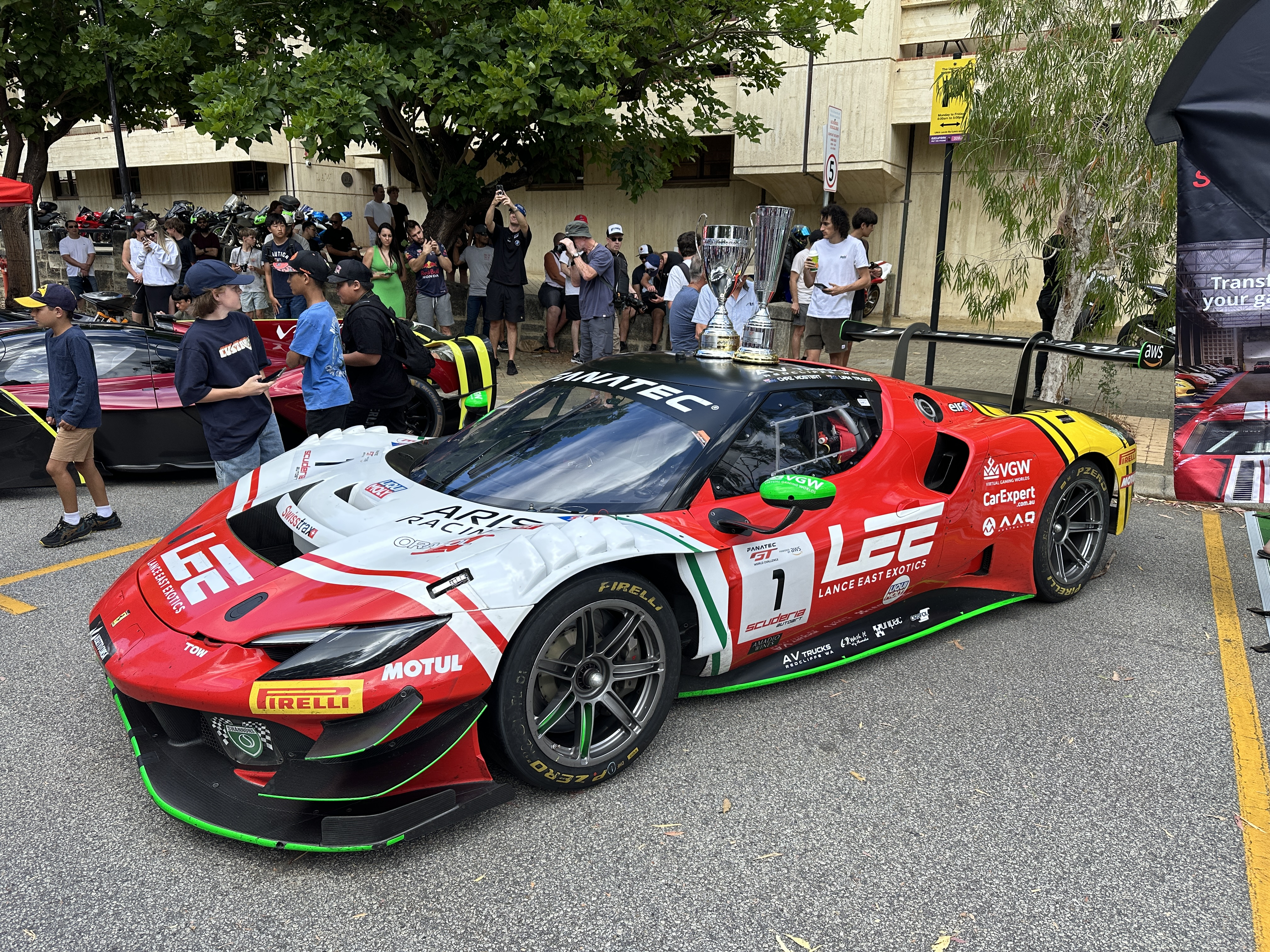
The winning Ferrari 296 GT3 driven by Liam Talbot and Chaz Mostert.

== Calendar ==
The provisional seven-round calendar was released on 2 November 2023 with all rounds taking place in Australia. The calendar was finalised on 9 May 2024, alongside the announcement of the GT Festival, the first-ever event promoted by SRO Motorsports Australia.

Round	Circuit	City / State	Date	Map
1	(Victoria (state)) Phillip Island Grand Prix Circuit	Phillip Island, Victoria	12–14 April	2024 GT World Challenge Australia is located in Australia
2	(South Australia) The Bend Motorsport Park (West)	Tailem Bend, South Australia	31 May–2 June	2024 GT World Challenge Australia is located in Australia
3	Queensland Raceway	Ipswich, Queensland	2–4 August	2024 GT World Challenge Australia is located in Australia
4	(Victoria (state)) Phillip Island Grand Prix Circuit	Phillip Island, Victoria	23–25 August	2024 GT World Challenge Australia is located in Australia
5	(New South Wales) Mount Panorama Circuit	Bathurst, New South Wales	8–10 November	2024 GT World Challenge Australia is located in Australia
Enduro 1	(New South Wales) Mount Panorama Circuit	Bathurst, New South Wales	16–18 February	2024 GT World Challenge Australia is located in Australia
Enduro 2	(New South Wales) Sydney Motorsport Park	Eastern Creek, New South Wales	18–19 October	2024 GT World Challenge Australia is located in Australia

== Entry list ==
=== Sprint Cup ===
Team	Car	Engine	No.	Drivers	Class	Rounds
(Australia) Arise Racing GT	Ferrari 296 GT3	Ferrari F163CE 3.0 L Turbo V6	1	(Australia) Chaz Mostert	PA	All
(Australia) Arise Racing GT	Ferrari 296 GT3	Ferrari F163CE 3.0 L Turbo V6	1	(Australia) Liam Talbot	PA	All
(Australia) Arise Racing GT	Ferrari 296 GT3	Ferrari F163CE 3.0 L Turbo V6	8	(New Zealand) Jaxon Evans	PA	All
(Australia) Arise Racing GT	Ferrari 296 GT3	Ferrari F163CE 3.0 L Turbo V6	8	(Australia) Elliott Schutte	PA	All
(Australia) Grove Racing	Mercedes-AMG GT3 Evo	Mercedes-AMG M159 6.2 L V8	4	(Australia) Brenton Grove	PA	1, 3–5
(Australia) Grove Racing	Mercedes-AMG GT3 Evo	Mercedes-AMG M159 6.2 L V8	4	(Australia) Stephen Grove	PA	1, 3–5
(Australia) Melbourne Performance Centre (Note: Car No. 7 entered as Dayle ITM, No. 9 as Hallmarc, No. 22 as Audi Sport Customer Racing Australia, No. 87 as Shaw and Partners, No. 88 as Melbourne Performance Centre, and No. 181 as OnlyFans.)	Audi R8 LMS Evo II	Audi DAR 5.2 L V10	7	(New Zealand) Brendon Leitch	PA	All
(Australia) Melbourne Performance Centre	Audi R8 LMS Evo II	Audi DAR 5.2 L V10	7	(New Zealand) Tim Miles	PA	All
(Australia) Melbourne Performance Centre	Audi R8 LMS Evo II	Audi DAR 5.2 L V10	9	(Australia) Marc Cini	Am	All
(Australia) Melbourne Performance Centre	Audi R8 LMS Evo II	Audi DAR 5.2 L V10	22	(Australia) Ash Samadi	Am	All
(Australia) Melbourne Performance Centre	Audi R8 LMS Evo II	Audi DAR 5.2 L V10	87	(Australia) Will Brown	PA	All
(Australia) Melbourne Performance Centre	Audi R8 LMS Evo II	Audi DAR 5.2 L V10	87	(Australia) Brad Schumacher	PA	All
(Australia) Melbourne Performance Centre	Audi R8 LMS Evo II	Audi DAR 5.2 L V10	88	(New Zealand) Steve Brooks	PA	2
(Australia) Melbourne Performance Centre	Audi R8 LMS Evo II	Audi DAR 5.2 L V10	88	(Australia) Nick McBride	PA	2
(Australia) Melbourne Performance Centre	Audi R8 LMS Evo II	Audi DAR 5.2 L V10	181	(Australia) Renee Gracie	PA	All
(Australia) Melbourne Performance Centre	Audi R8 LMS Evo II	Audi DAR 5.2 L V10	181	(Australia) Paul Stokell	PA	All
(Australia) Volante Rosso Motorsport	Aston Martin Vantage AMR GT3	Aston Martin M177 4.0 L Turbo V8	14	(Australia) Alex Gardner	PA	3–4
(Australia) Volante Rosso Motorsport	Aston Martin Vantage AMR GT3	Aston Martin M177 4.0 L Turbo V8	14	(Australia) Ben Porter	PA	3
(Australia) Volante Rosso Motorsport	Aston Martin Vantage AMR GT3	Aston Martin M177 4.0 L Turbo V8	14	(Australia) Ross Poulakis	PA	4
(Australia) Volante Rosso Motorsport	Mercedes-AMG GT3 Evo	Mercedes-AMG M159 6.2 L V8	34	(Australia) Chris Batzios	Am 3 PA 4	3–4
(Australia) Volante Rosso Motorsport	Mercedes-AMG GT3 Evo	Mercedes-AMG M159 6.2 L V8	34	(Australia) Ross Poulakis	Am 3 PA 4	3
(Australia) Volante Rosso Motorsport	Mercedes-AMG GT3 Evo	Mercedes-AMG M159 6.2 L V8	34	(Australia) David Brabham	Am 3 PA 4	4
(Australia) Black Wolf Motorsport	Mercedes-AMG GT3 Evo	Mercedes-AMG M159 6.2 L V8	16	(Australia) Ben Schoots	Am	All
(Australia) Black Wolf Motorsport	Mercedes-AMG GT3 Evo	Mercedes-AMG M159 6.2 L V8	16	(Australia) Shane Woodman	Am	All
(Germany) Car Collection Motorsport	Porsche 911 GT3 R (992)	Porsche M97/80 4.2 L Flat-6	21	(Switzerland) Alex Fontana	PA	5
(Germany) Car Collection Motorsport	Porsche 911 GT3 R (992)	Porsche M97/80 4.2 L Flat-6	21	(United States) 'Hash'	PA	5
(Australia) Tony Bates Racing	Mercedes-AMG GT3 Evo	Mercedes-AMG M159 6.2 L V8	24	(Australia) Tony Bates	Am	1
(Australia) KMB Motorsport	Aston Martin V12 Vantage GT3	Aston Martin AM28 5.9 L V12	38	(Australia) Valentino Astuti	T	All
(Australia) KMB Motorsport	Aston Martin V12 Vantage GT3	Aston Martin AM28 5.9 L V12	38	(Australia) Michael Bailey	T	1
(Australia) KMB Motorsport	Aston Martin V12 Vantage GT3	Aston Martin AM28 5.9 L V12	38	(Australia) Darren Currie	T	2–4
(Australia) KMB Motorsport	Aston Martin V12 Vantage GT3	Aston Martin AM28 5.9 L V12	38	(Australia) Liam Dunn	T	5
(Australia) Tigani Motorsport (Note: Car No. 44 entered as Geyer Valmont Racing, No. 47 as Supabarn Supermarkets, and No. 66 as Realta.)	Audi R8 LMS Evo II	Audi DAR 5.2 L V10	44	(Australia) Sergio Pires	Am	1–2, 4–5
(Australia) Tigani Motorsport	Audi R8 LMS Evo II	Audi DAR 5.2 L V10	44	(Australia) Marcel Zalloua	Am	1–2, 4
(Australia) Tigani Motorsport	Mercedes-AMG GT3 Evo	Mercedes-AMG M159 6.2 L V8	47	(Australia) James Koundouris	Am	All
(Australia) Tigani Motorsport	Mercedes-AMG GT3 Evo	Mercedes-AMG M159 6.2 L V8	47	(Australia) Theo Koundouris	Am	All
(Australia) Tigani Motorsport	Mercedes-AMG GT3 Evo	Mercedes-AMG M159 6.2 L V8	66	(Australia) Paul Lucchitti	PA	All
(Australia) Tigani Motorsport	Mercedes-AMG GT3 Evo	Mercedes-AMG M159 6.2 L V8	66	(Australia) Jayden Ojeda	PA	All
GWR Australia/RAM Motorsport	Mercedes-AMG GT3 Evo	Mercedes-AMG M159 6.2 L V8	45	(Australia) Mike Sheargold	Am	All
GWR Australia/RAM Motorsport	Mercedes-AMG GT3 Evo	Mercedes-AMG M159 6.2 L V8	45	(Australia) Garth Walden	Am	All
(Australia) Stephen Coe Racing	Ferrari 458 Italia GT3	Ferrari F136F 4.5 L V8	56	(Australia) Stephen Coe	T	5
(Australia) Team BRM	Audi R8 LMS Evo II	Audi DAR 5.2 L V10	81	(Australia) Alex Peroni	PA	All
(Australia) Team BRM	Audi R8 LMS Evo II	Audi DAR 5.2 L V10	81	(Australia) Mark Rosser	PA	All
(Australia) Wall Racing	Lamborghini Huracán GT3 Evo 2	Lamborghini DGF 5.2 L V10	93	(Australia) Tony D'Alberto	PA	2
(Australia) Wall Racing	Lamborghini Huracán GT3 Evo 2	Lamborghini DGF 5.2 L V10	93	(Australia) Adrian Deitz	PA	2
(Australia) 111 Racing	Mercedes-AMG GT3 Evo	Mercedes-AMG M159 6.2 L V8	111	(Australia) Darren Currie	Am	5
(Australia) 111 Racing	Mercedes-AMG GT3 Evo	Mercedes-AMG M159 6.2 L V8	111	(Australia) Grant Donaldson	Am	5
(Australia) Scott Taylor Motorsport	Porsche 997 GT3-R	Porsche 4.0 L Flat-6	222	(Australia) Paul Morris	T	3–4
(Australia) Scott Taylor Motorsport	Porsche 997 GT3-R	Porsche 4.0 L Flat-6	222	(Australia) Scott Taylor	T	3–4
(Australia) Triple Eight Race Engineering	Mercedes-AMG GT3 Evo	Mercedes-AMG M159 6.2 L V8	888	(Australia) Declan Fraser	PA	All
(Australia) Triple Eight Race Engineering	Mercedes-AMG GT3 Evo	Mercedes-AMG M159 6.2 L V8	888	(Australia) Peter Hackett	PA	All

Icon	Class
PA	Pro-Am class
Am	Am class
T	Trophy Cup

=== Endurance Cup ===
Team	Car	Engine	No.	Drivers	Class	Rounds
(Australia) Arise Racing GT	Ferrari 296 GT3	Ferrari F163 3.0 L Turbo V6	1	(Australia) Chaz Mostert	PA	2
(Australia) Arise Racing GT	Ferrari 296 GT3	Ferrari F163 3.0 L Turbo V6	1	(Australia) Liam Talbot	PA	2
(Australia) Arise Racing GT	Ferrari 296 GT3	Ferrari F163 3.0 L Turbo V6	8	(New Zealand) Jaxon Evans	PA	2
(Australia) Arise Racing GT	Ferrari 296 GT3	Ferrari F163 3.0 L Turbo V6	8	(Australia) Elliott Schutte	PA	2
(Australia) Grove Racing	Mercedes-AMG GT3 Evo	Mercedes-AMG M159 6.2 L V8	4	(Australia) Brenton Grove	PA	2
(Australia) Grove Racing	Mercedes-AMG GT3 Evo	Mercedes-AMG M159 6.2 L V8	4	(Australia) Stephen Grove	PA	2
(Australia) Melbourne Performance Centre (Note: Car No. 2 entered as KFC Racing Audi Sport MPC, Car No. 7 entered as Dayle ITM, No. 22 as Wash It Audi Sport MPC, No. 87 as Shaw and Partners, and No. 181 as OnlyFans.)	Audi R8 LMS Evo II	Audi DAR 5.2 L V10	2	(Australia) Brad Schumacher	PA	1
(Australia) Melbourne Performance Centre	Audi R8 LMS Evo II	Audi DAR 5.2 L V10	7	(New Zealand) Brendon Leitch	PA	2
(Australia) Melbourne Performance Centre	Audi R8 LMS Evo II	Audi DAR 5.2 L V10	7	(New Zealand) Tim Miles	PA	2
(Australia) Melbourne Performance Centre	Audi R8 LMS Evo II	Audi DAR 5.2 L V10	22	(Australia) Liam Talbot	PA	1
(Australia) Melbourne Performance Centre	Audi R8 LMS Evo II	Audi DAR 5.2 L V10	87	(Australia) Will Brown	PA	2
(Australia) Melbourne Performance Centre	Audi R8 LMS Evo II	Audi DAR 5.2 L V10	87	(Australia) Brad Schumacher	PA	2
(Australia) Melbourne Performance Centre	Audi R8 LMS Evo II	Audi DAR 5.2 L V10	181	(Australia) Renee Gracie	PA	2
(Australia) Melbourne Performance Centre	Audi R8 LMS Evo II	Audi DAR 5.2 L V10	181	(Australia) Paul Stokell	PA	2
(Australia) Volante Rosso Motorsport	Aston Martin Vantage AMR GT3	Aston Martin M177 4.0 L Turbo V8	14	(Philippines) Andre Canard	PA	2
(Australia) Volante Rosso Motorsport	Aston Martin Vantage AMR GT3	Aston Martin M177 4.0 L Turbo V8	14	(United Arab Emirates) Jamie Day	PA	2
(Australia) Black Wolf Motorsport	Mercedes-AMG GT3 Evo	Mercedes-AMG M159 6.2 L V8	16	(Australia) Ben Schoots	Am	2
(Australia) Black Wolf Motorsport	Mercedes-AMG GT3 Evo	Mercedes-AMG M159 6.2 L V8	16	(Australia) Shane Woodman	Am	2
(Australia) Tigani Motorsport (Note: Car No. 44 entered as Geyer Valmont Racing, No. 47 as Supabarn Supermarkets, and No. 66 as Realta.)	Audi R8 LMS Evo II	Audi DAR 5.2 L V10	44	(Australia) Sergio Pires	Am	All
(Australia) Tigani Motorsport	Audi R8 LMS Evo II	Audi DAR 5.2 L V10	44	(Australia) Marcel Zalloua	Am	All
(Australia) Tigani Motorsport	Mercedes-AMG GT3 Evo	Mercedes-AMG M159 6.2 L V8	47	(Australia) James Koundouris	Am	All
(Australia) Tigani Motorsport	Mercedes-AMG GT3 Evo	Mercedes-AMG M159 6.2 L V8	47	(Australia) Theo Koundouris	Am	All
(Australia) Tigani Motorsport	Mercedes-AMG GT3 Evo	Mercedes-AMG M159 6.2 L V8	66	(Australia) Paul Lucchitti	PA	2
(Australia) Tigani Motorsport	Mercedes-AMG GT3 Evo	Mercedes-AMG M159 6.2 L V8	66	(Australia) Jayden Ojeda	PA	2
GWR Australia/RAM Motorsport	Mercedes-AMG GT3 Evo	Mercedes-AMG M159 6.2 L V8	45	(Australia) Mike Sheargold	Am	2
GWR Australia/RAM Motorsport	Mercedes-AMG GT3 Evo	Mercedes-AMG M159 6.2 L V8	45	(Australia) Garth Walden	Am	2
(Australia) Erebus Motorsport	Mercedes-AMG GT3 Evo	Mercedes-AMG M159 6.2 L V8	48	(Australia) Garth Walden	Am	1
(Australia) Team BRM	Audi R8 LMS Evo II	Audi DAR 5.2 L V10	81	(Australia) Alex Peroni	PA	2
(Australia) Team BRM	Audi R8 LMS Evo II	Audi DAR 5.2 L V10	81	(Australia) Mark Rosser	PA	2
(Australia) Triple Eight Race Engineering	Mercedes-AMG GT3 Evo	Mercedes-AMG M159 6.2 L V8	888	(Australia) Declan Fraser	PA	2
(Australia) Triple Eight Race Engineering	Mercedes-AMG GT3 Evo	Mercedes-AMG M159 6.2 L V8	888	(Australia) Peter Hackett	PA	2

Icon	Class
PA	Pro-Am class
Am	Am class

== Race results ==
Bold indicates the overall winner.

Round		Circuit	Pole position	Pro-Am winners	Am winners	Trophy winners
1	R1	(Victoria (state)) Phillip Island	(Australia) No. 8 Arise Racing GT (Note: Liam Talbot was quickest in Qualifying 2, which decided the grid for Race 1, but received a five-place grid penalty for speeding in pit lane, promoting Elliott Schutte to pole position. Chaz Mostert and Talbot did keep the bonus point for pole position.)	**(Australia) No. 1 Arise Racing GT**	(Australia) No. 44 Tigani Motorsport	(Australia) No. 38 KMB Motorsport
1	R1	(Victoria (state)) Phillip Island	(New Zealand) Jaxon Evans (Australia) Elliott Schutte	**(Australia) Chaz Mostert** **(Australia) Liam Talbot**	(Australia) Sergio Pires (Australia) Marcel Zalloua	(Australia) Valentino Astuti (Australia) Michael Bailey
1	R2	(Victoria (state)) Phillip Island	(Australia) No. 1 Arise Racing GT	**(Australia) No. 7 Melbourne Performance Centre**	(Australia) No. 22 Melbourne Performance Centre	(Australia) No. 38 KMB Motorsport
1	R2	(Victoria (state)) Phillip Island	(Australia) Chaz Mostert (Australia) Liam Talbot	**(New Zealand) Brendon Leitch** **(New Zealand) Tim Miles**	(Australia) Ash Samadi	(Australia) Valentino Astuti (Australia) Michael Bailey
2	R1	(South Australia) The Bend (West)	(Australia) No. 87 Melbourne Performance Centre	**(Australia) No. 888 Triple Eight Race Engineering**	(Australia) No. 44 Tigani Motorsport	(Australia) No. 38 KMB Motorsport
2	R1	(South Australia) The Bend (West)	(Australia) Will Brown (Australia) Brad Schumacher	**(Australia) Declan Fraser** **(Australia) Peter Hackett**	(Australia) Sergio Pires (Australia) Marcel Zalloua	(Australia) Valentino Astuti (Australia) Darren Currie
2	R2	(South Australia) The Bend (West)	(Australia) No. 8 Arise Racing GT	**(Australia) No. 87 Melbourne Performance Centre**	No. 45 GWR Australia/RAM Motorsport	(Australia) No. 38 KMB Motorsport
2	R2	(South Australia) The Bend (West)	(New Zealand) Jaxon Evans (Australia) Elliott Schutte	**(Australia) Will Brown** **(Australia) Brad Schumacher**	(Australia) Mike Sheargold (Australia) Garth Walden	(Australia) Valentino Astuti (Australia) Darren Currie
3	R1	Queensland	(Australia) No. 87 Melbourne Performance Centre	**(Australia) No. 81 Team BRM**	(Australia) No. 16 Black Wolf Motorsport	(Australia) No. 222 Scott Taylor Motorsport
3	R1	Queensland	(Australia) Will Brown (Australia) Brad Schumacher	**(Australia) Alex Peroni** **(Australia) Mark Rosser**	(Australia) Ben Schoots (Australia) Shane Woodman	(Australia) Paul Morris (Australia) Scott Taylor
3	R2	Queensland	(Australia) No. 66 Tigani Motorsport	**(Australia) No. 87 Melbourne Performance Centre**	No. 45 GWR Australia/RAM Motorsport	(Australia) No. 38 KMB Motorsport
3	R2	Queensland	(Australia) Paul Lucchitti (Australia) Jayden Ojeda	**(Australia) Will Brown** **(Australia) Brad Schumacher**	(Australia) Mike Sheargold (Australia) Garth Walden	(Australia) Valentino Astuti (Australia) Darren Currie
4	R1	(Victoria (state)) Phillip Island	(Australia) No. 1 Arise Racing GT	**(Australia) No. 1 Arise Racing GT**	(Australia) No. 44 Tigani Motorsport	(Australia) No. 222 Scott Taylor Motorsport
4	R1	(Victoria (state)) Phillip Island	(Australia) Chaz Mostert (Australia) Liam Talbot	**(Australia) Chaz Mostert** **(Australia) Liam Talbot**	(Australia) Sergio Pires (Australia) Marcel Zalloua	(Australia) Paul Morris (Australia) Scott Taylor
4	R2	(Victoria (state)) Phillip Island	(Australia) No. 1 Arise Racing GT	**(Australia) No. 8 Arise Racing GT**	No. 45 GWR Australia/RAM Motorsport	(Australia) No. 222 Scott Taylor Motorsport
4	R2	(Victoria (state)) Phillip Island	(Australia) Chaz Mostert (Australia) Liam Talbot	**(New Zealand) Jaxon Evans** **(Australia) Elliott Schutte**	(Australia) Mike Sheargold (Australia) Garth Walden	(Australia) Paul Morris (Australia) Scott Taylor
5	R1	(New South Wales) Bathurst	(Australia) No. 1 Arise Racing GT	**(Australia) No. 87 Melbourne Performance Centre**	(Australia) No. 44 Tigani Motorsport	(Australia) No. 38 KMB Motorsport
5	R1	(New South Wales) Bathurst	(Australia) Chaz Mostert (Australia) Liam Talbot	**(Australia) Will Brown** **(Australia) Brad Schumacher**	(Australia) Sergio Pires	(Australia) Valentino Astuti (Australia) Liam Dunn
5	R2	(New South Wales) Bathurst	(Australia) No. 7 Melbourne Performance Centre	**(Australia) No. 81 Team BRM**	(Australia) No. 44 Tigani Motorsport	(Australia) No. 56 Stephen Coe Racing
5	R2	(New South Wales) Bathurst	(New Zealand) Brendon Leitch (New Zealand) Tim Miles	**(Australia) Alex Peroni** **(Australia) Mark Rosser**	(Australia) Sergio Pires	(Australia) Stephen Coe
Enduro 1		(New South Wales) Bathurst	(Australia) No. 22 Melbourne Performance Centre	(Australia) **No. 22 Melbourne Performance Centre**	(Australia) No. 44 Tigani Motorsport	No Entrants
Enduro 1		(New South Wales) Bathurst	(Australia) Liam Talbot	(Australia) **Liam Talbot**	(Australia) Sergio Pires (Australia) Marcel Zalloua	No Entrants
Enduro 2		(New South Wales) Eastern Creek	No. 45 GWR Australia/RAM Motorsport	**(Australia) No. 66 Tigani Motorsport**	No. 45 GWR Australia/RAM Motorsport	No Entrants
Enduro 2		(New South Wales) Eastern Creek	(Australia) Mike Sheargold (Australia) Garth Walden	**(Australia) Paul Lucchitti** **(Australia) Jayden Ojeda**	(Australia) Mike Sheargold (Australia) Garth Walden	No Entrants

== Championship standings ==
Scoring system

Position	**1st**	**2nd**	**3rd**	**4th**	**5th**	**6th**	**7th**	**8th**	**9th**	**10th**	**Pole**
Points	25	18	15	12	10	8	6	4	2	1	1

This season saw the introduction of a point for pole position to the championship for sprint cup races, owing to the SRO takeover of the series.

=== Pro-Am Cup ===
Pos	Driver	Team	PHI (Victoria (state))		BEN (South Australia)		QUE (Queensland)		PHI (Victoria (state))		BAT (New South Wales)		Points
1	(Australia) Chaz Mostert (Australia) Liam Talbot	(Australia) Arise Racing GT	1	**4**	2	2	6	4	**1**	**2**	**2**	3	174
2	(Australia) Will Brown (Australia) Brad Schumacher	(Australia) Melbourne Performance Centre	3	3	**4**	1	**Ret**	1	5	7	1	6	143
3	(New Zealand) Jaxon Evans (Australia) Elliott Schutte	(Australia) Arise Racing GT	**2**	7	3	**3**	4	6	7	1	6	4	126
4	(Australia) Declan Fraser (Australia) Peter Hackett	(Australia) Triple Eight Race Engineering	5	5	1	6	5	3	3	6	9	2	121
5	(Australia) Alex Peroni (Australia) Mark Rosser	(Australia) Team BRM	9	Ret	7	5	1	8	2	4	4	1	116
6	(New Zealand) Brendon Leitch (New Zealand) Tim Miles	(Australia) Melbourne Performance Centre	4	1	5	4	3	2	10	9	3	**9**	113
7	(Australia) Paul Lucchitti (Australia) Jayden Ojeda	(Australia) Tigani Motorsport	7	2	8	8	2	**5**	Ret	Ret	7	7	75
8	(Australia) Renee Gracie (Australia) Paul Stokell	(Australia) Melbourne Performance Centre	8	6	6	Ret	Ret	7	6	5	8	5	60
9	(Australia) Brenton Grove	(Australia) Grove Racing	6*	WD			Ret	WD	4	3	5	8	41
10	(Australia) Stephen Grove	(Australia) Grove Racing	WD	WD			Ret	WD	4	3	5	8	41
11	(New Zealand) Steve Brooks (Australia) Nick McBride	(Australia) Melbourne Performance Centre			9	7							8
12	(Australia) Chris Batzios (Australia) David Brabham	(Australia) Volante Rosso Motorsport							9	8			6
13	(Australia) Alex Gardner	(Australia) Volante Rosso Motorsport					WD	WD	8	Ret			4
14	(Australia) Ross Poulakis	(Australia) Volante Rosso Motorsport							8	Ret			4
15	(Australia) Tony D'Alberto (Australia) Adrian Deitz	(Australia) Wall Racing			10	9							3
16	(Australia) Ben Porter	(Australia) Volante Rosso Motorsport					WD	WD					0
Entries ineligible to score points
—	(Switzerland) Alex Fontana (United States) 'Hash'	(Germany) Car Collection Motorsport									10	10	0
Pos	Driver	Team	PHI (Victoria (state))		BEN (South Australia)		QUE (Queensland)		PHI (Victoria (state))		BAT (New South Wales)		Points

Key
Colour	Result
Gold	Race winner
Silver	2nd place
Bronze	3rd place
Green	Points finish
Blue	Non-points finish
Blue	Non-classified finish (NC)
Purple	Did not finish (Ret)
Black	Disqualified (DSQ)
Black	Excluded (EX)
White	Did not start (DNS)
White	Race cancelled (C)
White	Withdrew (WD)
Blank	Did not participate

**Bold** – Pole
Italics – Fastest lap

=== Am Cup ===
Pos	Driver	Team	PHI (Victoria (state))		BEN (South Australia)		QUE (Queensland)		PHI (Victoria (state))		BAT (New South Wales)		Points
1	(Australia) Mike Sheargold (Australia) Garth Walden	GWR Australia/RAM Motorsport	2	**5**	**3**	1	**3**	1	2	**1**	2	**2**	192
2	(Australia) Sergio Pires	(Australia) Tigani Motorsport	**1**	Ret	1	Ret			**1**	5	**1**	1	138
3	(Australia) James Koundouris (Australia) Theo Koundouris	(Australia) Tigani Motorsport	3	3	2	**2**	2	3	4	2	Ret	WD	130
4	(Australia) Ben Schoots (Australia) Shane Woodman	(Australia) Black Wolf Motorsport	Ret	WD	4	3	1	**5**	3	Ret	3	3	109
5	(Australia) Ash Samadi	(Australia) Melbourne Performance Centre	Ret	1	6	4	5	2	6	3	5	Ret	106
6	(Australia) Marc Cini	(Australia) Melbourne Performance Centre	4	4	5	Ret	Ret	6	5	4	4	5	88
7	(Australia) Marcel Zalloua	(Australia) Tigani Motorsport	**1**	Ret	1	Ret			**1**	5			87
8	(Australia) Chris Batzios (Australia) Ross Poulakis	(Australia) Volante Rosso Motorsport					4	4					24
9	(Australia) Tony Bates	(Australia) Tony Bates Racing	Ret	2									18
Entries ineligible to score points
-	(Australia) Darren Currie (Australia) Grant Donaldson	(Australia) 111 Racing									6	4	0
Pos	Driver	Team	PHI (Victoria (state))		BEN (South Australia)		QUE (Queensland)		PHI (Victoria (state))		BAT (New South Wales)		Points

=== Trophy Cup ===
Pos	Driver	Team	PHI (Victoria (state))		BEN (South Australia)		QUE (Queensland)		PHI (Victoria (state))		BAT (New South Wales)		Points
1	(Australia) Valentino Astuti	(Australia) KMB Motorsport	**1**	**1**	**1**	**1**	**Ret**	**1**	**Ret**	**2**	1	**Ret**	177
2	(Australia) Darren Currie	(Australia) KMB Motorsport			**1**	**1**	**Ret**	**1**	**Ret**	**2**			99
3	(Australia) Paul Morris (Australia) Scott Taylor	(Australia) Scott Taylor Motorsport					1	2	1	1			93
4	(Australia) Michael Bailey	(Australia) KMB Motorsport	**1**	**1**									52
5	(Australia) Liam Dunn	(Australia) KMB Motorsport									1	**Ret**	26
Entries ineligible to score points
—	(Australia) Stephen Coe	(Australia) Stephen Coe Racing									**Ret**	1	0
Pos	Driver	Team	PHI (Victoria (state))		BEN (South Australia)		QUE (Queensland)		PHI (Victoria (state))		BAT (New South Wales)		Points

Notes:

- * – After Brenton Grove's co-driver Stephen Grove withdrew from the weekend, Brenton was permitted to race as a solo Pro-Am entry in race 1 at Phillip Island, but was ineligible for points.

=== Pro-Am Cup ===
Pos	Driver	Team	BAT (New South Wales)	EAS (New South Wales)	Points
1	(Australia) Liam Talbot	(Australia) Melbourne Performance Centre	1		43
1	(Australia) Liam Talbot	(Australia) Arise Racing GT		2	43
2	(Australia) Paul Lucchitti (Australia) Jayden Ojeda	(Australia) Tigani Motorsport		1	25
3	(Australia) Brad Schumacher	(Australia) Melbourne Performance Centre	**2**	DNS	18
4	(Australia) Chaz Mostert	(Australia) Arise Racing GT		2	18
5	(New Zealand) Brendon Leitch (New Zealand) Tim Miles	(Australia) Melbourne Performance Centre		3	15
6	(New Zealand) Jaxon Evans (Australia) Elliott Schutte	(Australia) Arise Racing GT		4	12
7	(Australia) Renee Gracie (Australia) Paul Stokell	(Australia) Melbourne Performance Centre		**5**	10
8	(Australia) Alex Peroni (Australia) Mark Rosser	(Australia) Team BRM		6	8
9	(Australia) Declan Fraser (Australia) Peter Hackett	(Australia) Triple Eight Race Engineering		7	6
—	(Australia) Brenton Grove (Australia) Stephen Grove	(Australia) Grove Racing		Ret	0
—	(Australia) Will Brown	(Australia) Melbourne Performance Centre		DNS	0
—	(Philippines) Andre Canard (United Arab Emirates) Jamie Day	(Australia) Volante Rosso Motorsport		WD	0
Pos	Driver	Team	BAT (New South Wales)	EAS (New South Wales)	Points

=== Am Cup ===
Pos	Driver	Team	BAT (New South Wales)	EAS (New South Wales)	Points
1	(Australia) Garth Walden	(Australia) Erebus Motorsport	**3**		40
1	(Australia) Garth Walden	GWR Australia/RAM Motorsport		**1**	40
2	(Australia) Marcel Zalloua (Australia) Sergio Pires	(Australia) Tigani Motorsport	1	3	40
3	(Australia) James Koundouris (Australia) Theo Koundouris	(Australia) Tigani Motorsport	2	4	30
4	(Australia) Mike Sheargold	GWR Australia/RAM Motorsport		**1**	25
5	(Australia) Ben Schoots (Australia) Shane Woodman	(Australia) Black Wolf Motorsport		2	18
Pos	Driver	Team	EAS (New South Wales)	BAT (New South Wales)	Points

=== Teams' Championship ===
Only Pro-Am class cars are eligible to score points towards the teams championship, and only results from the Sprint Cup counted towards the teams championship

Pos	Team	PHI (Victoria (state))		BEN (South Australia)		QUE (Queensland)		PHI (Victoria (state))		BAT (New South Wales)		Points
1	(Australia) Arise Racing GT	**1**	**3**	2	**2**	4	3	**1**	**1**	**2**	3	192
2	(Australia) Melbourne Performance Centre	2	1	**3**	1	**3**	1	5	4	1	**4**	185
3	(Australia) Team BRM	5	Ret	4	3	1	5	2	3	3	1	145
4	(Australia) Triple Eight Race Engineering	3	4	1	4	5	2	3	5	6	2	143
5	(Australia) Tigani Motorsport	4	2	5	5	2	**4**	Ret	Ret	5	5	101
6	(Australia) Grove Racing	6*	WD			Ret	WD	4	2	4	6	50
7	(Australia) Volante Rosso Motorsport					WD	WD	6	6			16
8	(Australia) Wall Racing			6	6							16
Entries ineligible to score points
—	(Germany) Car Collection Motorsport									7	7	0
Pos	Team	PHI (Victoria (state))		BEN (South Australia)		QUE (Queensland)		PHI (Victoria (state))		BAT (New South Wales)		Points

== See also ==
- 2024 British GT Championship
- 2024 GT World Challenge Europe Endurance Cup
- 2024 GT World Challenge Europe Sprint Cup
- 2024 GT World Challenge Asia
- 2024 GT World Challenge America
- 2024 Intercontinental GT Challenge
