= 2018 Australian GT Trophy Series =

Motor racing competition

The 2018 Australian GT Trophy Series was an Australian motor racing competition for FIA GT3 cars and similar approved automobiles. It was contested over a five rounds series which was managed by Trofeo Motorsport Pty Ltd and sanctioned by the Confederation of Australian Motor Sport (CAMS) as an Authorised Series.

The series was won by Nick Kelly driving an Audi R8 LMS Ultra.

== See also ==
- 2018 Australian GT Championship
