= Liam Talbot =

Australian racing driver (born 1981)

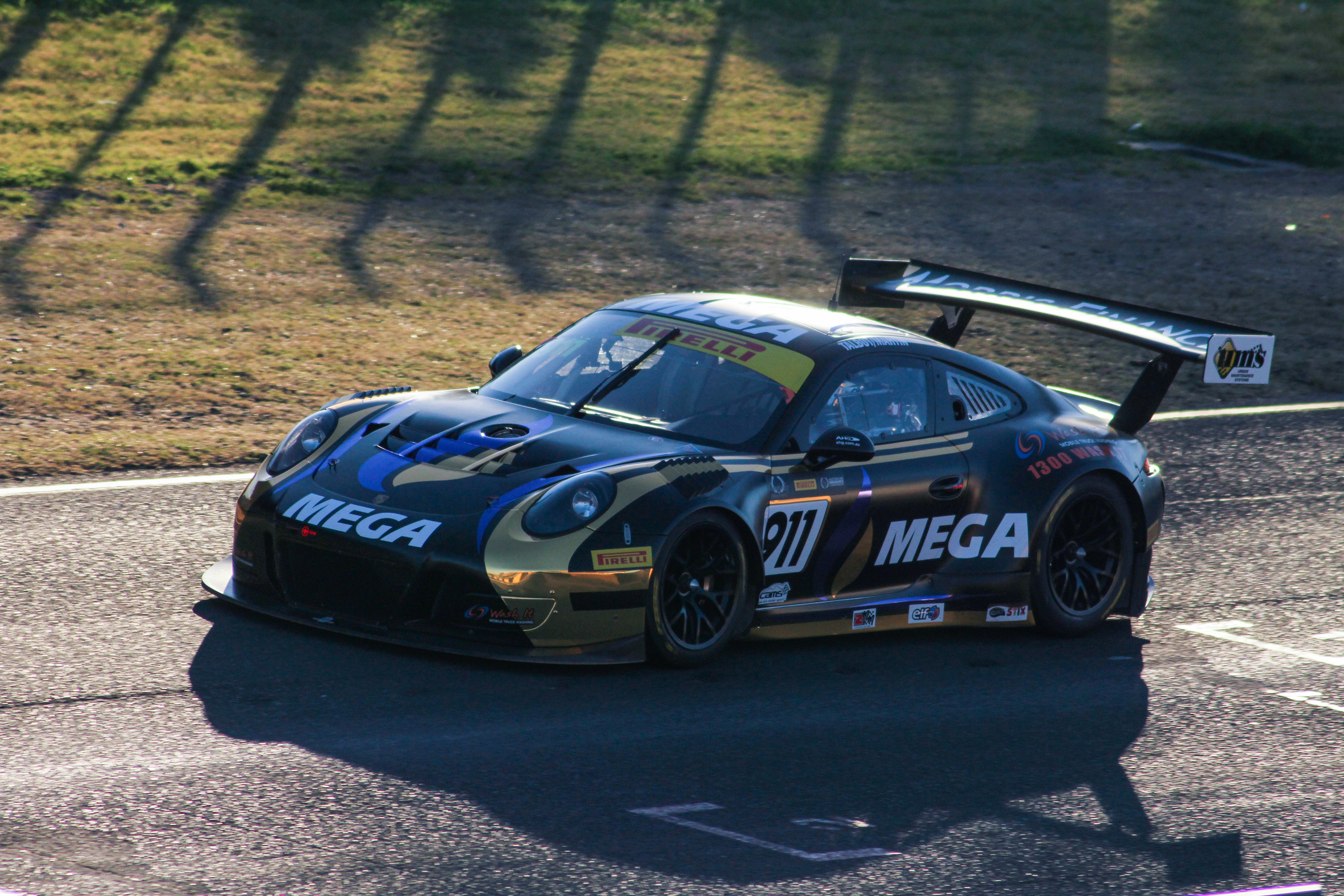
- Talbot in 2017
- Nationality: (Australia) Australian
- Born: 26 July 1981 (age 45) Brisbane, Australia
- Relatives: Ken Talbot (father)
- Categorisation: FIA Bronze

Championship titles
- 2024 2024 2023-2024 2019 2016 2013: GT World Challenge Australia Endurance Cup – Pro-Am; GT World Challenge Australia Sprint Cup – Pro-Am; GT World Challenge Australia – GT3 Pro-Am; Porsche Carrera Cup Australia – Pro-Am; Blancpain Endurance Series – Am; Radical Australia Cup – SR3

Liam Anthony Talbot (born 26 July 1981) is an Australian racing driver who last competed in GT World Challenge Australia for Volante Rosso Motorsport.

== Career ==
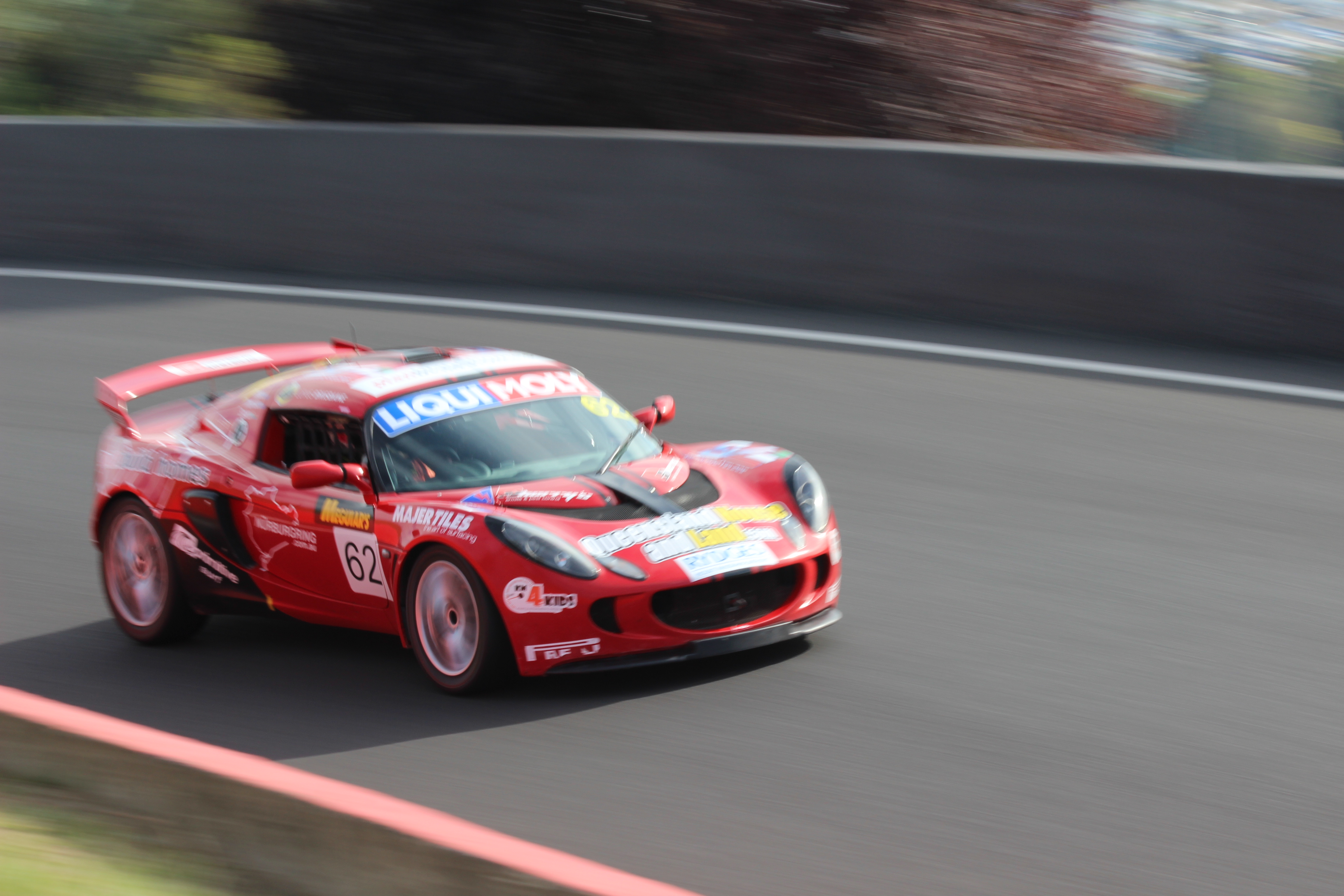
The Class C-winning Lotus Exige of Talbot at the 2013 Bathurst 12 Hour

Talbot began his racing career in 2012, competing in the Queensland Production Sports Car Championship. The following year, Talbot won the SR3 title in the Radical Australia Cup, as well as winning the Bathurst 12 Hour in the C class, and finishing second in the Sports Car class of the Highlands 101. In 2014, Talbot finished second in the SP8 class of the 24 Hours of Nürburgring for Aston Martin Test Centre, as well as racing for Ferrari-fielding Kessel Racing in the final two rounds of the Blancpain Endurance Series. At the end of the year, Talbot also raced for the team at the Gulf 12 Hours, which he won in the Gentleman class.

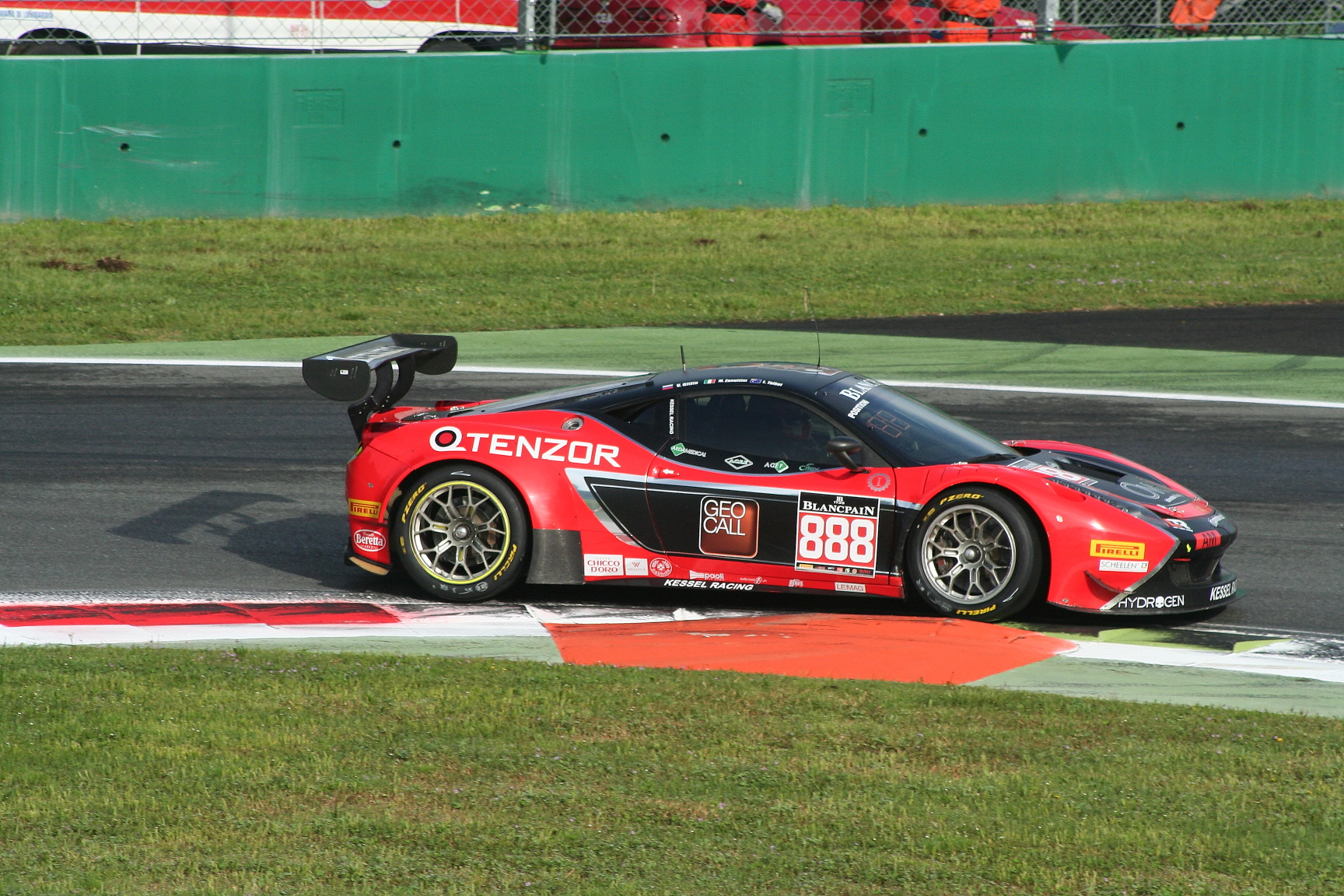
Talbot aboard a Kessel Racing Ferrari on his way to the 2016 Blancpain Endurance Series Am title

For the following year, Talbot remained with Kessel Racing to race in the Am class of the Blancpain Endurance Series alongside Stephen Earle and Marco Zanuttini. In his first full season in the series, Talbot won in class at Monza and scored a class podium at the 24 Hours of Spa to secure third in points. Returning to the team for the 2016 season, Talbot scored class wins at Le Castellet and the 24 Hours of Spa to clinch the Am title at season's end. After racing in the last two rounds of the 2016–17 Asian Le Mans Series' GT class for McLaren-affiliated OD Racing, Talbot headed back to Australia for the rest of 2017, joining Walkinshaw Racing to race a Porsche 911 GT3 R in the Bathurst 12 Hour and the Australian GT Championship. After winning the former in the Am class, Talbot raced in the latter, scoring wins at Albert Park, Wanneroo and Townsville en route to runner-up honors in points.

Continuing with Walkinshaw for the 2018 season, Talbot won twice at Sydney and scored six more podiums to finish the year runner-up in points for the second year in a row. The following year, Talbot joined Wall Racing to race in the Pro-Am class of Porsche Carrera Cup Australia, taking six class wins and eight further podiums to clinch the title at season's end. During 2019, Talbot also made select appearances in the Australian GT Championship for Lamborghini-linked Trofeo Motorsport, winning the Tailem Bend enduro and finishing on the podium in the other four races he contested. At the beginning of 2020, Talbot raced in the last three rounds of the 2019–20 Asian Le Mans Series for Ferrari customer HubAuto Corsa in the GT class, winning at Buriram and finishing third in points. At the beginning of 2020, Talbot also raced in the Bathurst 12 Hour for Trofeo Motorsport.

After not racing for the rest of the year, Talbot joined HubAuto Racing on its switch to Mercedes-AMG machinery to race in the Asian Le Mans Series' GT class at the beginning of 2021, in which he scored a best result of fourth in race two at Dubai. Talbot then raced an Audi in the final round of that year's GT World Challenge Australia at Bathurst for Melbourne Performance Centre, in which he won race two. Remaining with the team for the 2022 season, Talbot scored wins at Phillip Island and Adelaide en route to runner-up honors in GT3 Pro-Am. In parallel, Talbot raced in the Pro-Am class of Porsche Carrera Cup Australia for Wall Racing, taking seven class wins and seven further podiums en route to a third-place points finish.

Returning to Melbourne Performance Centre for 2023, Talbot began the year by winning the Bathurst 12 Hour in the Pro-Am class, before returning to the team to continue racing in GT World Challenge Australia. Opening up the season with a double win at Bathurst, Talbot then scored four wins in the next five rounds as he clinched the GT3 Pro-Am title. During 2023, Talbot also raced for HubAuto Racing in the GT class of the Asian Le Mans Series, as well as making select appearances in Porsche Carrera Cup Australia's Pro-Am class for Wall Racing. Towards the end of the year, Talbot made his FIA World Endurance Championship debut for D'station Racing at the 8 Hours of Bahrain, in which he finished second in the LMGTE Am class at the wheel of an Aston Martin.

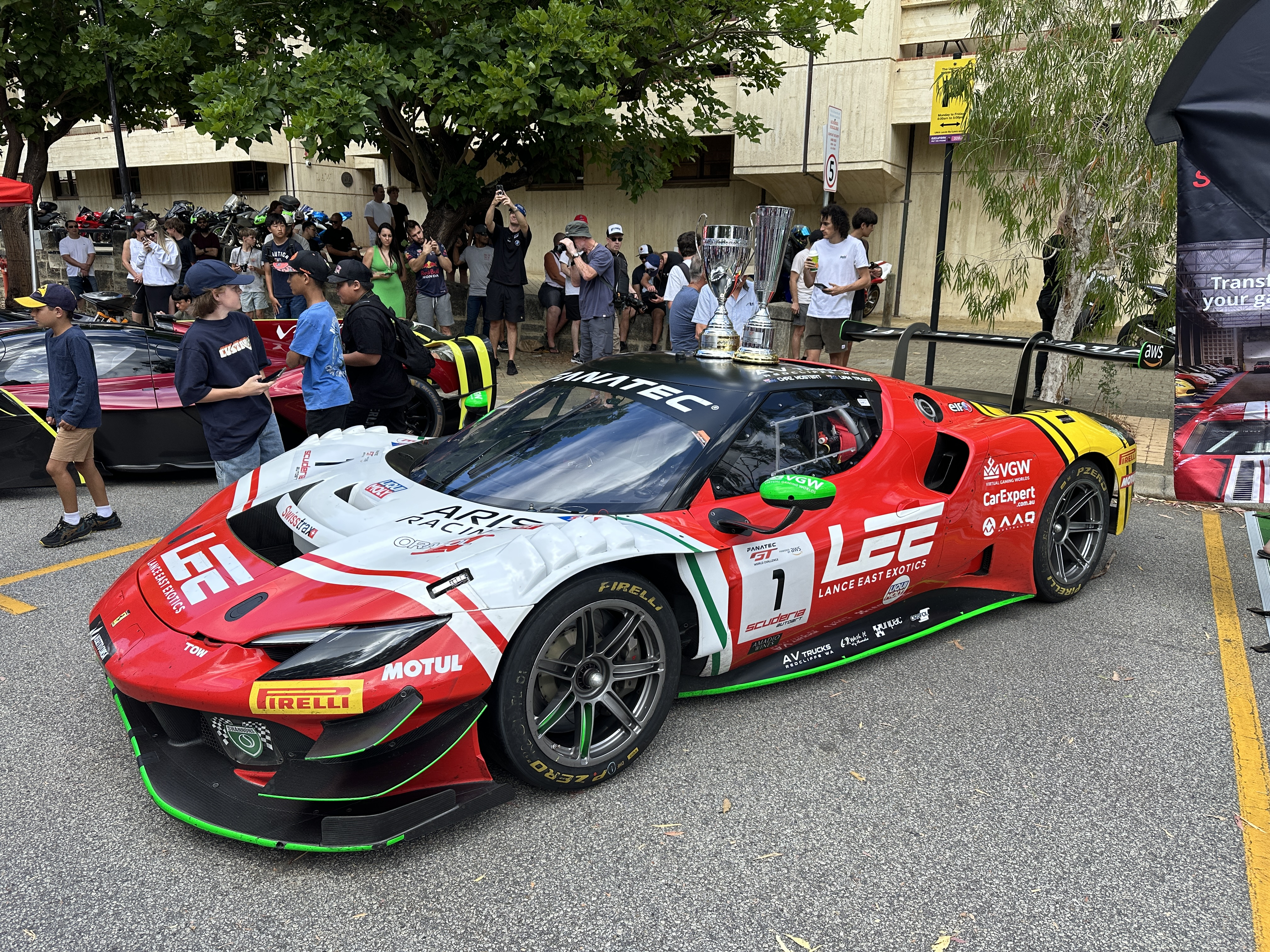
The Arise Racing Ferrari Talbot drove to the 2024 GT World Challenge Australia title

After finishing third overall in the Bathurst 12 Hour in early 2024 with Melbourne Performance Centre, Talbot joined Arise Racing GT to race in GT World Challenge Australia for the rest of the year. The Ferrari 296 GT3 he shared with Chaz Mostert won twice at Phillip Island and scored five more podiums to take the Sprint Cup title, and also won the Sydney enduro en route to the Endurance Cup and combined titles in Pro-Am. Switching to Aston Martin-associated Volante Rosso Motorsport for the following season, Talbot scored a lone win at Sandown as he ended his title-defending year fifth in the Pro-Am points. During 2025, Talbot also raced at the Bathurst 12 Hour for Melbourne Performance Centre, as well as racing in the Beijing round of GT World Challenge Asia for EBM, in which he won race one in the Am class.

== Racing record ==
=== Racing career summary ===
Season	Series	Team	Races	Wins	Poles	F/Laps	Podiums	Points	Position
2012	Queensland Production Sports Car Championship		3	0	0	0	3	42	4th
2013	Bathurst 12 Hour – C	Rob Thomson Racing	1	1	0	0	1	—N/a	**1st**
2013	Australian GT Championship – GT Sports	Refresh Cosmetic & Laser Clinic	2	1	0	0	2	324	5th
2013	Radical Australia Cup	Radical Race Experience	15	0	0	0	1	380	**2nd**
2013	Highlands 101 – Sports Car	Melbourne Performance Centre	1	0	0	0	1	—N/a	**2nd**
2014	Bathurst 12 Hour – A	Rod Salmon Racing	0	0	0	0	0	—N/a	DNS
2014	Australian GT Championship – GT Trophy	Rod Salmon Racing	2	0	0	0	0	68	15th
2014	24 Hours of Nürburgring – SP8	Aston Martin Test Centre	1	0	0	0	1	—N/a	**2nd**
2014	Blancpain Endurance Series – Am	Kessel Racing	2	0	0	0	1	19	18th
2014	Gulf 12 Hours – Gent	Kessel Racing	1	1	0	0	1	—N/a	**1st**
2015	Blancpain Endurance Series – Am	Kessel Racing	4	1	0	0	2	67	**3rd**
2015	VLN Series – SP8	Aston Martin Test Centre	2	0	0	0	0	0	NC
2015	24 Hours of Nürburgring – SP8	Aston Martin Test Centre	1	0	0	0	0	—N/a	DNF
2015	Aston Martin Le Mans Festival – GT4	Aston Martin Lagonda	1	0	0	0	0	—N/a	DNF
2016	Blancpain Endurance Series – Am	Kessel Racing	5	2	1	0	2	96	**1st**
2016	Ferrari Challenge Europe – Trofeo Pirelli Pro	Kessel Racing	1	0	0	0	0	9	11th
2016	Australian Endurance Championship – GT	Skwirk Online Education	4	0	0	0	0	205	14th
2016	Australian GT Championship – GT	Skwirk Online Education	2	0	0	0	0	45	39th
2016	Australian GT Championship – GT	Walkinshaw Racing	2	0	0	0	0	45	39th
2016–17	Asian Le Mans Series – GT	OD Racing Best Leader Team	2	0	0	0	0	1	20th
2017	Bathurst 12 Hour – AAM	Walkinshaw GT3	1	1	0	0	1	—N/a	**1st**
2017	Intercontinental GT Challenge	Walkinshaw GT3	1	0	0	0	0	0	NC
2017	Australian GT Championship – GT	Walkinshaw Racing	15	3	0	0	5	670	**2nd**
2017	Australian Endurance Championship	Walkinshaw Racing	4	0	0	0	1	480	**3rd**
2018	Bathurst 12 Hour – APA	Nineteen Corp P/L	1	0	0	0	0	—N/a	9th
2018	Australian GT Championship	Walkinshaw Racing	12	2	1	0	8	1604	**2nd**
2018	Australian Endurance Championship	Walkinshaw Racing	3	0	0	0	2	578	5th
2019	Australian GT Championship	Trofeo Motorsport	5	1	0	0	5	715	6th
2019	Australian Endurance Championship	Trofeo Motorsport	2	1	0	0	2	557	**3rd**
2019	Porsche Carrera Cup Australia – Pro-Am	Wall Racing	24	6	0	0	14	958	**1st**
2019–20	Asian Le Mans Series – GT	HubAuto Corsa	3	1	1	0	3	62	**3rd**
2020	Bathurst 12 Hour – Silver	Trofeo Motorsport	1	0	0	0	0	—N/a	4th
2020	Australian Endurance Championship – Silver	Trofeo Motorsport	1	0	0	0	1	406	**2nd**
2021	Asian Le Mans Series – GT	HubAuto Racing	4	0	2	0	0	28	7th
2021	GT World Challenge Australia – GT3 Pro-Am	CoinSpot	2	1	1	0	2	43	9th
2022	Bathurst 12 Hour – AAM	CoinSpot Racing Team	1	0	0	0	0	—N/a	DNF
2022	Intercontinental GT Challenge	CoinSpot Racing Team	1	0	0	0	0	0	NC
2022	GT World Challenge Australia – GT3 Pro-Am	CoinSpot Racing Team	10	2	2	0	10	166	**2nd**
2022	Porsche Carrera Cup Australia – Pro-Am	Wall Racing	24	7	2	7	14	887	**3rd**
2023	Bathurst 12 Hour – Pro-Am	Melbourne Performance Centre	1	1	0	0	1	—N/a	**1st**
2023	Asian Le Mans Series – GT	HubAuto Racing	4	0	2	0	0	12	12th
2023	GT World Challenge Australia – GT3 Pro-Am	Melbourne Performance Centre	13	6	0	0	10	238	**1st**
2023	Porsche Carrera Cup Australia – Pro-Am	Wall Racing	8	4	0	0	7	433	9th
2023	FIA World Endurance Championship – LMGTE Am	D'station Racing	1	0	0	0	1	27	16th
2024	Bathurst 12 Hour	Melbourne Performance Centre	1	0	0	0	1	—N/a	**3rd**
2024	GT World Challenge Australia Sprint Cup – Pro-Am	Arise Racing GT	10	2	4	0	7	174	**1st**
2024	GT World Challenge Australia Endurance Cup – Pro-Am	Arise Racing GT	2	1	0	0	2	43	**1st**
2024	24H Series – GT3 Pro-Am	Prime Speed Sport	1	0	0	0	1	32	13th
2025	Bathurst 12 Hour	Melbourne Performance Centre	1	0	0	0	0	—N/a	DNF
2025	GT World Challenge Australia – Pro-Am	Volante Rosso Motorsport	12	1	1	0	3	117	5th
2025	GT World Challenge Asia – Am	EBM	2	1	1	0	2	43	9th
2026	Porsche Carrera Cup Australia – Pro-Am	Wall Racing							

=== Complete GT World Challenge Europe results ===
==== GT World Challenge Europe Endurance Cup ====
(Races in bold indicate pole position) (Races in italics indicate fastest lap)

Year	Team	Car	Class	1	2	3	4	5	6	7	Pos.	Points
2014	Kessel Racing	Ferrari 458 Italia GT3	Am	MNZ	SIL	LEC	SPA; 6H; Ret	SPA; 12H; Ret	SPA; 24H; Ret	NÜR; 23	18th	19
2015	Kessel Racing	Ferrari 458 Italia GT3	Am	MNZ; 24	SIL; DNS	LEC; 44	SPA; 6H; 41	SPA; 12H; 28	SPA; 24H; 19	NÜR; 42	3rd	67
2016	Kessel Racing	Ferrari 458 Italia GT3	Am	MNZ; Ret	SIL; 45	LEC; 22	**SPA**; **6H**; 43	**SPA**; **12H**; 36	**SPA**; **24H**; 32	NÜR; 43	1st	96

=== Complete Asian Le Mans Series results ===
(key) (Races in bold indicate pole position) (Races in italics indicate fastest lap)

Year	Team	Class	Car	Engine	1	2	3	4	Pos	Points
2016–17	OD Racing Best Leader Team	GT	McLaren 650S GT3	McLaren M838T 3.8 L Turbo V8	ZHU	FUJ	CHA; Ret	SEP; 10	20th	1
2019–20	HubAuto Corsa	GT	Ferrari 488 GT3 Evo 2020	Ferrari F154CB 3.9 L Turbo V8	SHA	**BEN**; 2	CHA; 2	SEP; 1	3rd	62
2021	HubAuto Racing	GT	Mercedes-AMG GT3 Evo	Mercedes-AMG M159 6.2 L V8	DUB; 1 Ret	DUB; 2; 4	**ABU**; **1**; 5	**ABU**; **2**; 8	7th	28
2023	HubAuto Racing	GT	Mercedes-AMG GT3 Evo	Mercedes-AMG M159 6.2 L V8	DUB; 1 Ret	DUB; 2; 9	**ABU**; **1**; 14	**ABU**; **2**; 16	12th	12

=== Complete FIA World Endurance Championship results ===
(key) (Races in bold indicate pole position) (Races in italics indicate fastest lap)

Year	Entrant	Class	Car	Engine	1	2	3	4	5	6	7	Rank	Pts
2023	D'station Racing	LMGTE Am	Aston Martin Vantage AMR	Aston Martin 4.0 L Turbo V8	SEB	PRT	SPA	LMS	MNZ	FUJ	BHR; 2	16th	27

=== Complete GT World Challenge Asia results ===
(key) (Races in bold indicate pole position) (Races in italics indicate fastest lap)

Year	Team	Car	Class	1	2	3	4	5	6	7	8	9	10	11	12	DC	Points
2025	EBM	Mercedes-AMG GT3 Evo	Am	SEP; 1	SEP; 2	MAN; 1	MAN; 2	BUR; 1	BUR; 2	FUJ; 1	FUJ; 2	OKA; 1	OKA; 2	BEI; 1; 1	**BEI**; **2**; 2	9th	43
