= Geoff Emery =

Australian racing driver

- Nationality: Australian
- Born: 4 August 1969 (age 57) Melbourne, Victoria
- Categorisation: FIA Silver (until 2021); FIA Bronze (2022–)

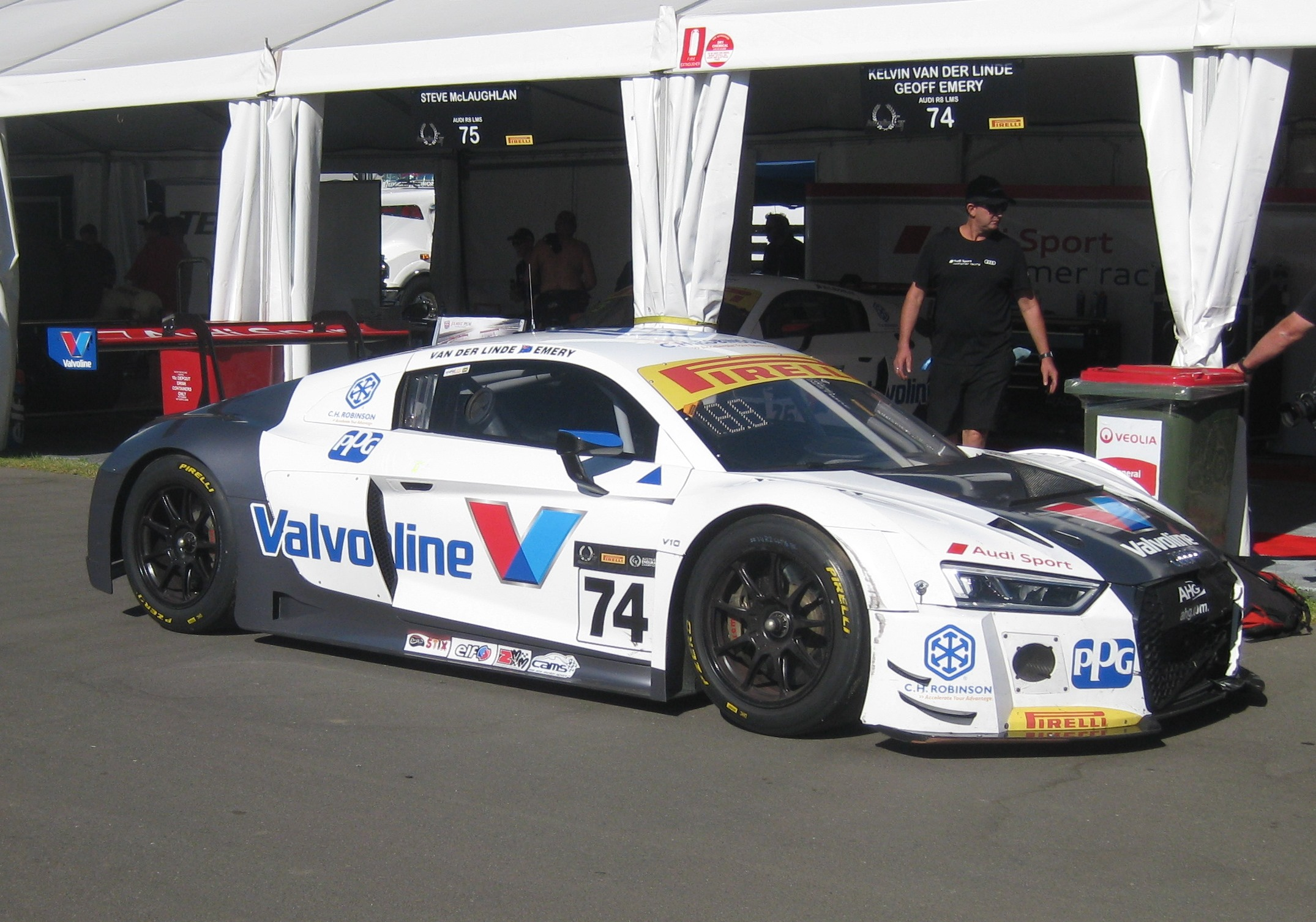
The Audi R8 LMS GT3 of Geoff Emery.

Geoffrey Alan Emery (born 4 August 1969 in Melbourne) is a racing driver from Australia. He is a three-time winner of the Australian GT Championship, and competed in the 2010 Bathurst 1000.

== Career results ==
| Season | Series | Position | Car | Team |
|---|---|---|---|---|
| 2005 | Australian V8 Ute Racing Series | 35th | Holden Commodore VY Ute | Geoff Emery Motorsport |
| 2006 | V8 Supercars Fujitsu Series | 24th | Holden Commodore VY | Smiths Trucks Racing |
| 2007 | V8 Supercars Fujitsu Series | NC | Ford Falcon BA | MW Motorsport |
| 2008 | V8 Supercars Fujitsu Series | 17th | Holden Commodore VZ | TAG Motorsport |
| 2009 | V8 Supercars Fujitsu Series | 10th | Holden Commodore VZ | TAG Motorsport |
| 2010 | V8 Supercars Fujitsu Series | 7th | Holden Commodore VE | Geoff Emery Motorsport; Greg Murphy Racing |
| 2010 | V8 Supercars Championship Series | 53rd | Holden Commodore VE | Greg Murphy Racing |
| 2011 | V8 Supercars Fujitsu Series | 14th | Holden Commodore VE | Greg Murphy Racing |
| 2012 | V8 Supercars Dunlop Series | 8th | Holden Commodore VE | Greg Murphy Racing |
| 2012 | New Zealand V8SuperTourers | 15th | Holden Commodore VE | MPC Motorsport |
| 2013 | V8 Supercars Dunlop Series | 14th | Holden Commodore VE | Evans Motorsport Group |
| 2013 | New Zealand V8SuperTourers | 32nd | Holden Commodore VE | MPC Motorsport |
| 2014 | V8 Supercars Dunlop Series | 14th | Holden Commodore VE | GMJ Motorsports |
| 2015 | V8 Supercars Dunlop Series | 36th | Holden Commodore VE | THR Developments |
| 2015 | Australian GT Championship | 12th | Mercedes-Benz SLS AMG GT3 | Erebus Motorsport |
| 2016 | Australian GT Championship | 18th | Audi R8 LMS GT3 | Audi Sport Customer Racing |
| 2017 | Australian GT Championship | 1st | Audi R8 LMS GT3 | Audi Sport Customer Racing |
| 2017 | Australian V8 Touring Car Series | 12th | Holden Commodore VE | Geoff Emery Motorsport |
| 2018 | Australian GT Championship | 1st | Audi R8 LMS GT3 | Audi Sport Customer Racing |
| 2018 | Australian V8 Touring Car Series | 20th | Holden Commodore VE | Geoff Emery Motorsport |
| 2019 | Australian GT Championship | 1st | Audi R8 LMS Evo | Melbourne Performance Center |

=== V8 Supercars Development Series results ===
(key) (Race results only)

V8 Supercars Development Series results
| Year | Team | Car | 1 | 2 | 3 | 4 | 5 | 6 | 7 | 8 | 9 | 10 | 11 | 12 | 13 | 14 | 15 | 16 | 17 | 18 | Position | Points |
|---|---|---|---|---|---|---|---|---|---|---|---|---|---|---|---|---|---|---|---|---|---|---|
| 2006 | Robert Smith Racing | Holden VY Commodore | ADE; R1; Ret | ADE; R2; 14 | WAK; R3; 12 | WAK; R4; 21 | WAK; R5; 21 | QLD; R6; 21 | QLD; R7; 19 | QLD; R8; Ret | ORA; R9; 18 | ORA; R10; Ret | ORA; R11; 23 | MAL; R12; 18 | MAL; R13; 26 | MAL; R14; Ret | BAT; R15; 27 | BAT; R16; Ret | PHI; R17; 11 | PHI; R18; 27 | 24th | 671 |
| 2007 | MW Motorsport | Ford BA Falcon | ADE; R1 | ADE; R2 | WAK; R3 | WAK; R4 | WAK; R5 | WIN; R6 | WIN; R7 | WIN; R8 | QLD; R9 | QLD; R10 | QLD; R11 | ORA; R12 | ORA; R13 | ORA; R14 | BAT; R15 | BAT; R16 | PHI; R17; 16 | PHI; R18; Ret | NC | 0 |
| 2008 | Novocastrian Motorsport | Holden Commodore VZ | ADE; 1; 26 | ADE; 2; 23 | WAK; 1; 12 | WAK; 2; 8 | WAK; 3; 8 | SAN; 1; 15 | SAN; 2 Ret | SAN; 3; 17 | IPS; 1; 15 | IPS; 2 Ret | IPS; 3; 22 | WIN; 1; 17 | WIN; 2; 10 | WIN; 3; 15 | BAT; 1; 20 | BAT; 2; 15 | OPK; 1; 16 | OPK; 2; 10 | 16th | 739 |
| 2009 | Novocastrian Motorsport | Ford Falcon BF | ADE; 1; 5 | ADE; 2 Ret | WIN; 1; 7 | WIN; 2; 5 | WIN; 3; 12 | TSV; 1 | TSV; 2 | TSV; 3 | SAN; 1 | SAN; 2 | SAN; 3 | IPS; 1 | IPS; 2 | IPS; 3 | BAT; 1; 17 | BAT; 2; 10 | SOP; 1; 7 | SOP; 2; 7 | 13th | 619 |
| 2010 | Novocastrian Motorsport | Ford Falcon BF | ADE; 1 Ret | ADE; 2; 6 | IPS; 1; 11 | IPS; 2; 6 | IPS; 3; 9 | WIN; 1 Ret | WIN; 2; 14 | WIN; 3; 7 | TSV; 1; 8 | TSV; 2; 16 | TSV; 3; 6 | BAT; 1 Ret | BAT; 2; 11 | SAN; 1; 9 | SAN; 2; 9 | SAN; 3; 19 | SOP; 1 Ret | SOP; 2; 5 | 10th | 850 |
| 2011 | Novocastrian Motorsport | Ford Falcon BF | ADE; 1; 6 | ADE; 2 Ret | PER; 1 Ret | PER; 2; 13 | TSV; 1; 12 | TSV; 2; 11 | TSV; 3 Ret | IPS; 1 Ret | IPS; 2; 11 | IPS; 3; 11 | BAT; 1 DNS | BAT; 2; 11 | SAN; 1; 12 | SAN; 2 Ret | SAN; 3; 19 | SOP; 1; 9 | SOP; 2; 9 | | 16th | 670 |
| 2012 | Novocastrian Motorsport | Ford Falcon BF | ADE; 1; 11 | ADE; 2; 12 | PER; 1; 15 | PER; 2; 12 | PER; 3; 9 | TSV; 1; 15 | TSV; 2; 10 | TSV; 3; 7 | IPS; 1; 16 | IPS; 2; 14 | IPS; 3; 13 | BAT; 1; 8 | BAT; 2; 12 | WIN; 1; 13 | WIN; 2; 5 | WIN; 3; 9 | SOP; 1; 9 | SOP; 2 Ret | 11th | 971 |
| 2013 | Novocastrian Motorsport | Ford Falcon FG | ADE; 1; 6 | ADE; 2; 12 | PER; 1; 13 | PER; 2; 9 | PER; 3; 12 | TSV; 1; 7 | TSV; 2 Ret | TSV; 3 Ret | IPS; 1; 9 | IPS; 2; 2 | IPS; 3; 12 | WIN; 1; 7 | WIN; 2; 2 | WIN; 3; 7 | BAT; 1; 7 | BAT; 2; 5 | SOP; 1; 11 | SOP; 2; 10 | 7th | 1138 |
| 2014 | Novocastrian Motorsport | Ford Falcon FG | ADE; 1; 9 | ADE; 2; 13 | WIN; 1; 28 | WIN; 2; 14 | PER; 1; 12 | PER; 2; 8 | TSV; 1; 4 | TSV; 2; 24 | IPS; 1; 2 | IPS; 2; 8 | BAT; 6 | SOP; 1; 3 | SOP; 2; 2 | | | | | | 7th | 1220 |
| 2015 | Novocastrian Motorsport | Ford Falcon FG | ADE; 1 | ADE; 2 | PER; 1 | PER; 2 | PER; 3 | WIN; 1 | WIN; 2 | WIN; 3 | TSV; 1 | TSV; 2 | IPS; 1 | IPS; 2 | IPS; 3 | BAT; 20 | SOP; 1 | SOP; 2 | | | 34th | 90 |
| 2016 | STR Truck Bodies | Ford Falcon FG | ADE; 1 | ADE; 2 | PHI; 1 | PHI; 2 | PHI; 3 | PER; 1 | PER; 2 | PER; 3 | TSV; 1 | TSV; 2 | SAN; 1 | SAN; 2 | SAN; 3 | BAT; 11 | SOP; 1 | SOP; 2 | | | 28th | 144 |

=== Complete Bathurst 1000 results ===
| Year | Team | Car | Co-driver | Position | Laps |
|---|---|---|---|---|---|
| 2010 | Greg Murphy Racing | Holden Commodore VE | (Australia) Rod Salmon‡ (Australia) Marcus Zukanovic | 24th | 156 |

‡Salmon was the entered driver, but his place was taken by Zukanovic before the race.

=== Bathurst 12 Hours results ===
| Year | Team | Co-Drivers | Car | Class | Laps | Pos. | Class Pos. |
|---|---|---|---|---|---|---|---|
| 2009 | (Australia) GSK Group | (Australia) Gerard Keogh (Australia) Bob Brewer | HSV E Series Clubsport R8 | A | 96 | DNF | DNF |
| 2010 | (Australia) Greg Murphy Racing | (New Zealand) Rob Wilson (Italy) Maurizio Fabris | HSV GTS | B | 176 | DNF | DNF |
| 2011 | (Australia) Procon Developments | (Australia) Dean Grant (Australia) Max Twigg | Mosler MT900 GT3 | A | 11 | DNF | DNF |
| 2020 | (Australia) Tony Bates Racing | (Australia) Tony Bates (Australia) Dylan O'Keeffe (Australia) Max Twigg | Audi R8 LMS | A Silver | 84 | DNF | DNF |
| 2022 | (Australia) Scott Taylor Motorsport | (Australia) Alex Davison (Australia) Craig Lowndes (Australia) Scott Taylor | Porsche 991 GT3 Cup | C | 276 | 10th | 1st |
| 2023 | (Australia) Scott Taylor Motorsport | (Australia) Alex Davison (Australia) Craig Lowndes (Australia) Scott Taylor | Mercedes-AMG GT3 | A Pro-Am | 177 | DNF | DNF |
| 2024 | (Australia) TekworkX Motorsport | (Australia) Daniel Stutterd (Canada) Paul Tracy (Australia) Max Twigg | MARC IRC GT | I | 233 | 20th | 2nd |

Sporting positions
| Preceded by Klark Quinn | Australian GT; Champion; 2017, 2018 and 2019 | Succeeded by Incumbent |
