= 2019 Australian GT Championship =

Motor racing competition

The 2019 Australian GT Championship was the 23rd running of the Australian GT Championship, a CAMS-sanctioned Australian motor racing championship open to FIA GT3 cars, FIA GT4 cars and similar cars as approved for the championship. The championship commenced on 14 March 2019 at the Melbourne Grand Prix Circuit and concluded on 9 November at Sandown Raceway. The championship was contested over seven rounds. Each race, with the exception of the Australian Grand Prix round, included at least one compulsory timed pit stop.

== Race calendar ==
The 2019 calendar was unveiled on 20 October 2018

Rnd	Circuit	Location	Date	Supporting
1	(Victoria (state)) Albert Park Grand Prix Circuit	Melbourne, Victoria	14–17 March	Australian Grand Prix; Supercars Championship
2	(Western Australia) Barbagallo Wanneroo Raceway	Neerabup, Western Australia	2–4 May	Supercars Championship
3	(Victoria (state)) Phillip Island Grand Prix Circuit	Phillip Island, Victoria	7–8 June	Shannons Nationals
4	(South Australia) The Bend Motorsport Park	Tailem Bend, South Australia	12–13 July	Shannons Nationals
5	(Victoria (state)) Sandown Raceway	Melbourne, Victoria	20-21 September	Shannons Nationals
6	(Queensland) Surfers Paradise Street Circuit	Surfers Paradise, Queensland	25–27 October	Supercars Championship
7	(Victoria (state)) Sandown Raceway	Melbourne, Victoria	8–9 November	Supercars Championship
NC	(New South Wales) Mount Panorama Circuit	Bathurst, New South Wales	28 November	Challenge Bathurst

Event is part of Australian GT Championship, Australian GT4 Championship and Australian Endurance Championship
Event is part of Australian GT Championship, Australian GT4 Championship, Australian GT Trophy Series and Tropheo Challenge
Event is a Sprint event to which Australian GT Championship was invited to attend in a non-championship capacity

== Entry list ==
=== Australian GT Championship ===
Team	Vehicle	No.	Drivers	Rounds
(Australia) Melbourne Performance Centre	Audi R8 LMS Evo	1	(Australia) Geoff Emery	All
(Australia) Melbourne Performance Centre	Audi R8 LMS Evo	1	(Australia) Garth Tander	3–5
(Australia) Melbourne Performance Centre	Audi R8 LMS Evo	24	(Australia) Tony Bates	1, 3, 7
(Australia) Melbourne Performance Centre	Audi R8 LMS Evo	24	(Australia) John Martin	3
(Australia) Melbourne Performance Centre	Audi R8 LMS Evo	33	(Australia) Vince Muriti	3
(Australia) Melbourne Performance Centre	Audi R8 LMS Evo	33	(Australia) Luke Youlden	3
(Australia) Melbourne Performance Centre	Audi R8 LMS Ultra	125	(Australia) Nick Kelly	3
(Australia) Melbourne Performance Centre	Audi R8 LMS Ultra	125	(Australia) Barton Mawer	3
(Australia) Wall Racing	Lamborghini Huracán GT3	6	(Australia) Adrian Deitz	3
(Australia) Wall Racing	Lamborghini Huracán GT3	6	(Australia) Cameron McConville	3
(Australia) Darrell Lea/Keltic Racing	Aston Martin V12 Vantage GT3	7	(United Kingdom) Tony Quinn	1, 3, 6
(Australia) Darrell Lea/Keltic Racing	Aston Martin V12 Vantage GT3	7	(New Zealand) Daniel Gaunt	3
(Australia) (United States) Scott Taylor Motorsport (Note: Car Nos. 8, 222 & 777 entered under an Australian racing licenses, while car no. 75 entered under a USA racing license)	Mercedes-AMG GT3	8	(Australia) Max Twigg	1–4
(Australia) (United States) Scott Taylor Motorsport	Mercedes-AMG GT3	8	(Australia) Tony D'Alberto	3–4
(Australia) (United States) Scott Taylor Motorsport	Mercedes-AMG GT3	75	(Australia) Kenny Habul	1
(Australia) (United States) Scott Taylor Motorsport	Mercedes-AMG GT3	222	(Australia) Scott Taylor	3–4
(Australia) (United States) Scott Taylor Motorsport	Mercedes-AMG GT3	222	(Australia) Craig Baird	3–4
(Australia) (United States) Scott Taylor Motorsport	Mercedes-AMG GT3	777	(Australia) Yasser Shahin	3–4
(Australia) (United States) Scott Taylor Motorsport	Mercedes-AMG GT3	777	(Australia) Jamie Whincup	3–4
(Australia) Totally 4X4 Wheels	Lamborghini Gallardo R-EX	14	(Australia) Peter Major	2
(Australia) Nineteen Corporation P/L	Mercedes-AMG GT3	19	(Australia) Mark Griffith	2, 7
(Australia) Aussie Driver Search	Audi R8 LMS	28	(Australia) Lee Partridge	1
(Australia) Team 59Racing	McLaren 720S GT3	59	(Australia) Fraser Ross	1, 3–7
(Australia) Team 59Racing	McLaren 720S GT3	59	(Australia) Ryan Simpson	3–5, 7
(Australia) Eggleston Motorsport	Mercedes-AMG GT3	63	(Australia) Peter Hackett	All
(Australia) Eggleston Motorsport	Mercedes-AMG GT3	63	(New Zealand) Dominic Storey	3–4
(Australia) Safe-T-Stop	Lamborghini Gallardo R-EX	69	(Australia) Richard Gartner	4
(Australia) Safe-T-Stop	Lamborghini Gallardo R-EX	69	(Australia) Hadrian Morrall	4
(Australia) Trofeo Motorsport	Lamborghini Huracán GT3	129	(Australia) Ryan Millier	2, 6
(Australia) Trofeo Motorsport	Lamborghini Huracán GT3	129	(Australia) Joseph Ensabella	3, 5
(Australia) Trofeo Motorsport	Lamborghini Huracán GT3	129	(Australia) Tim Blanchard	3
(Australia) Trofeo Motorsport	Lamborghini Huracán GT3	129	(Australia) Liam Talbot	4–5, 7
(Australia) Trofeo Motorsport	Lamborghini Huracán GT3	129	(New Zealand) Shane van Gisbergen	4

=== Australian Endurance Championship ===
Team	Car	No.	Drivers	Rounds
(Australia) Melbourne Performance Center	Audi R8 LMS Evo	1	(Australia) Geoff Emery	All
(Australia) Melbourne Performance Center	Audi R8 LMS Evo	1	(Australia) Garth Tander	All
(Australia) Melbourne Performance Center	Audi R8 LMS Evo	24	(Australia) Tony Bates	1
(Australia) Melbourne Performance Center	Audi R8 LMS Evo	24	(Australia) John Martin	1
(Australia) Melbourne Performance Center	Audi R8 LMS Evo	33	(Australia) Vince Muriti	1
(Australia) Melbourne Performance Center	Audi R8 LMS Evo	33	(Australia) Luke Youlden	1
(Australia) Melbourne Performance Center	Audi R8 LMS Ultra	99	(Australia) Nick Kelly	1
(Australia) Melbourne Performance Center	Audi R8 LMS Ultra	99	(Australia) Barton Mawer	1
(Australia) Wall Racing	Lamborghini Huracán GT3	6	(Australia) Adrian Deitz	1
(Australia) Wall Racing	Lamborghini Huracán GT3	6	(Australia) Cameron McConville	1
(Australia) Darrell Lea/Keltic Racing	Aston Martin V12 Vantage GT3	7	(United Kingdom) Tony Quinn	1
(Australia) Darrell Lea/Keltic Racing	Aston Martin V12 Vantage GT3	7	(New Zealand) Daniel Gaunt	1
(Australia) Scott Taylor Motorsport	Mercedes-AMG GT3	8	(Australia) Max Twigg	1–2
(Australia) Scott Taylor Motorsport	Mercedes-AMG GT3	8	(Australia) Tony D'Alberto	1–2
(Australia) Scott Taylor Motorsport	Mercedes-AMG GT3	222	(Australia) Scott Taylor	1–2
(Australia) Scott Taylor Motorsport	Mercedes-AMG GT3	222	(Australia) Craig Baird	1–2
(Australia) Scott Taylor Motorsport	Mercedes-AMG GT3	777	(Australia) Yasser Shahin	1–2
(Australia) Scott Taylor Motorsport	Mercedes-AMG GT3	777	(Australia) Jamie Whincup	1–2
(Australia) Team 59Racing	McLaren 720S GT3	59	(Australia) Fraser Ross	All
(Australia) Team 59Racing	McLaren 720S GT3	59	(Australia) Ryan Simpson	All
(Australia) Eggleston Motorsport	Mercedes-AMG GT3	63	(Australia) Peter Hackett	All
(Australia) Eggleston Motorsport	Mercedes-AMG GT3	63	(New Zealand) Dominic Storey	1–2
(Australia) Safe-T-Stop	Lamborghini Gallardo R-EX	69	(Australia) Richard Gartner	2
(Australia) Safe-T-Stop	Lamborghini Gallardo R-EX	69	(Australia) Hadrian Morrall	2
(Australia) Trofeo Motorsport	Lamborghini Huracán GT3	129	(Australia) Joseph Ensabella	1, 3
(Australia) Trofeo Motorsport	Lamborghini Huracán GT3	129	(Australia) Tim Blanchard	1
(Australia) Trofeo Motorsport	Lamborghini Huracán GT3	129	(Australia) Liam Talbot	2–3
(Australia) Trofeo Motorsport	Lamborghini Huracán GT3	129	(New Zealand) Shane van Gisbergen	2

=== Australian GT Trophy Series ===
Team	Car	No.	Drivers	Rounds
(Australia) Motorsport Leasing	Porsche 911 GT3 R (19)	34	(Australia) John Morriss	1
(Australia) Aaron Laboratories	Porsche 997 GT3 Cup	64	(Australia) Joseph Ensabella	All
(Australia) Safe-T-Stop	Lamborghini Gallardo R-EX	69	(Australia) Richard Gartner	1–3
(Australia) DPM Motorsports	Chevrolet Camaro SS GT3	71	(Australia) Dale Paterson	All
(Australia) Showergrate Shop	Lamborghini Gallardo R-EX	73	(Australia) Peter Corbett	3
(Australia) Industrie Motorsport	Audi R8 LMS Ultra	99	(Australia) Nick Kelly	1
(Australia) REN Racing	Audi R8 LMS Ultra	125	(Australia) Ryan How	1–2
(Australia) Scott Taylor Motorsport	Porsche 911 GT3 R (19)	222	(Australia) Scott Taylor	1–2

=== Tropheo Challenge ===
Team	Vehicle	No.	Drivers	Rounds
MARC Cars Australia	MARC II V8	20	(Australia) Adam Hargraves	3
MARC Cars Australia	MARC II V8	95	(Australia) Geoff Taunton	3
MARC Cars Australia	MARC I V8	28	(Australia) Bayley Hall	3
MARC Cars Australia	MARC I V8	93	(Australia) Broc Feeney	3
(Australia) Melbourne Orthopaedic	Porsche 991 GT3 Cup	21	(Australia) Shane Barwood	1
(Australia) Seidler Group	Porsche 991 GT3 Cup	22	(Australia) Chris Seidler	1
(Australia) Seidler Group	Porsche 991 GT3 Cup	22	(Australia) Luke Seidler	1
(Australia) Earth Electrical Contractors	Porsche 991 GT3 Cup	25	(Australia) Nick Karnaros	All
(Australia) Trofeo Motorsport	Lamborghini Huracán Super Trofeo Evo	29	(Australia) Jim Manolios	1–2
(Australia) Trofeo Motorsport	Lamborghini Huracán Super Trofeo Evo	29	(Australia) Ryan Millier	4
(Australia) Daikin Air Conditioning	Porsche 991 GT3 Cup	87	(Australia) David Greig	1, 4

=== Australian GT4 Championship ===
Team	Vehicle	No.	Drivers	Rounds
(Australia) MPD Steak Kitchen	Audi R8 LMS GT4	16	(Australia) Victor Zagame	1
(Australia) M-Motorsport	KTM X-Bow GT4	48	(Australia) Justin McMillan	1–6
(Australia) M-Motorsport	KTM X-Bow GT4	48	(Australia) Glen Wood	1–6
(Australia) M-Motorsport	KTM X-Bow GT4	48	(Australia) Dean Koutsoumidis	7
(Australia) M-Motorsport	KTM X-Bow GT4	50	(Australia) David Crampton	1–5, 7
(Australia) M-Motorsport	KTM X-Bow GT4	50	(Australia) Trent Harrison	1, 3–6
(Australia) Griffith Corporation	Ginetta G55 GT4	55	(Australia) Mark Griffith	1
(Australia) Team 59Racing	McLaren 570S GT4	74	(Australia) Ryan Simpson	1
(Australia) Team 59Racing	McLaren 570S GT4	74	(Australia) Christian Fitzgerald	5
(Australia) Team 59Racing	McLaren 570S GT4	74	(United Kingdom) Michael O'Brien	5
(Australia) Solar & Energy Finance	Ginetta G50 GT4	211	(Australia) Todd O'Brien	6

== Race results ==
Bold indicates overall winner.

Round		Circuit	Pole position	GT3 winners	GT4 winners	GT Trophy winners	Tropheo Challenge winners
1	R1	(Victoria (state)) Albert Park	(Australia) No. 8 STM - WM Waste	**(Australia) No. 59 Team 59Racing**	(Australia) No. 48 M Motorsport	(Australia) No. 125 REN Racing	(Australia) No. 25 Earth Electrical Contractors
1	R1	(Victoria (state)) Albert Park	(Australia) Max Twigg	**(Australia) Fraser Ross**	(Australia) Justin McMillan (Australia) Glen Wood	(Australia) Ryan How	(Australia) Nick Karnaros
1	R2	(Victoria (state)) Albert Park	(Australia) No. 59 Team 59Racing	**(United States) No. 75 Scott Taylor Motorsport**	(Australia) No. 74 Team 59Racing	(Australia) No. 125 REN Racing	(Australia) No. 21 Melbourne Orthopaedic Group
1	R2	(Victoria (state)) Albert Park	(Australia) Fraser Ross	**(Australia) Kenny Habul**	(Australia) Ryan Simpson	(Australia) Ryan How	(Australia) Shane Barwood
1	R3	(Victoria (state)) Albert Park		**(Australia) No. 63 Eggleston Motorsport**	(Australia) No. 48 M Motorsport	(Australia) No. 125 REN Racing	(Australia) No. 25 Earth Electrical Contractors
1	R3	(Victoria (state)) Albert Park		**(Australia) Peter Hackett**	(Australia) Justin McMillan (Australia) Glen Wood	(Australia) Ryan How	(Australia) Nick Karnaros
1	R4	(Victoria (state)) Albert Park		**(United States) No. 75 Scott Taylor Motorsport**	(Australia) No. 74 Team 59Racing	(Australia) No. 125 REN Racing	(Australia) No. 21 Melbourne Orthopaedic Group
1	R4	(Victoria (state)) Albert Park		**(Australia) Kenny Habul**	(Australia) Ryan Simpson	(Australia) Ryan How	(Australia) Shane Barwood
2	R1	(Western Australia) Barbagallo	(Australia) No. 14 Totally 4X4 Wheels	(Australia) No. 1 Melbourne Performance Centre	(Australia) No. 48 M-Motorsport	**(Australia) No. 125 REN Racing**	(Australia) No. 25 Earth Electrical Contractors
2	R1	(Western Australia) Barbagallo	(Australia) Peter Major	(Australia) Geoff Emery	(Australia) Justin McMillan (Australia) Glen Wood	**(Australia) Ryan How**	(Australia) Nick Karnaros
2	R2	(Western Australia) Barbagallo		**(Australia) No. 14 Totally 4X4 Wheels**	(Australia) No. 48 M-Motorsport	(Australia) No. 125 REN Racing	(Australia) No. 25 Earth Electrical Contractors
2	R2	(Western Australia) Barbagallo		**(Australia) Peter Major**	(Australia) Justin McMillan (Australia) Glen Wood	(Australia) Ryan How	(Australia) Nick Karnaros
2	R3	(Western Australia) Barbagallo		**(Australia) No. 1 Melbourne Performance Centre**	(Australia) No. 48 M-Motorsport	(Australia) No. 71 DPM Motorsports	(Australia) No. 25 Earth Electrical Contractors
2	R3	(Western Australia) Barbagallo		**(Australia) Geoff Emery**	(Australia) Justin McMillan (Australia) Glen Wood	(Australia) Dale Paterson	(Australia) Nick Karnaros
3		(Victoria (state)) Phillip Island	(Australia) No. 59 Team 59Racing	**(Australia) No. 1 Melbourne Performance Centre**	(Australia) No. 48 M-Motorsport	Did Not Participate	
3		(Victoria (state)) Phillip Island	(Australia) Fraser Ross (Australia) Ryan Simpson	**(Australia) Geoff Emery** **(Australia) Garth Tander**	(Australia) Justin McMillan (Australia) Glen Wood	Did Not Participate	
4		(South Australia) The Bend	(Australia) No. 63 Eggleston Motorsport	**(Australia) No. 129 Trofeo Motorsport**	(Australia) No. 50 M-Motorsport	Did Not Participate	
4		(South Australia) The Bend	(Australia) Peter Hackett (New Zealand) Dominic Storey	**(Australia) Liam Talbot** **(New Zealand) Shane van Gisbergen**	(Australia) David Crampton (Australia) Trent Harrison	Did Not Participate	
5		(Victoria (state)) Sandown	(Australia) No. 59 Team 59Racing	**(Australia) No. 63 Eggleston Motorsport**	(Australia) No. 48 M-Motorsport	Did Not Participate	
5		(Victoria (state)) Sandown	(Australia) Fraser Ross (Australia) Ryan Simpson	**(Australia) Peter Hackett**	(Australia) Justin McMillan (Australia) Glen Wood	Did Not Participate	
6	R1	(Queensland) Surfers Paradise	(Australia) No. 59 Team 59Racing	**(Australia) No. 129 Trofeo Motorsport**	(Australia) No. 48 M Motorsport	(Australia) No. 64 Aaron Laboratories	No. 95 MARC Cars Australia
6	R1	(Queensland) Surfers Paradise	(Australia) Fraser Ross	**(Australia) Ryan Millier**	(Australia) Justin McMillan (Australia) Glen Wood	(Australia) Joseph Ensabella	(Australia) Geoff Taunton
6	R2	(Queensland) Surfers Paradise		**(Australia) No. 59 Team 59Racing**	(Australia) No. 50 M Motorsport	(Australia) No. 71 DPM Motorsports	No. 20 MARC Cars Australia
6	R2	(Queensland) Surfers Paradise		**(Australia) Fraser Ross**	(Australia) Trent Harrison	(Australia) Dale Paterson	(Australia) Adam Hargraves
7	R1	(Victoria (state)) Sandown	(Australia) No. 59 Team 59Racing	**(Australia) No. 63 Eggleston Motorsport**	(Australia) No. 48 M Motorsport	(Australia) No. 64 Aaron Laboratories	(Australia) No. 29 Trofeo Motorsport
7	R1	(Victoria (state)) Sandown	(Australia) Fraser Ross (Australia) Ryan Simpson	**(Australia) Peter Hackett**	(Australia) Dean Koutsoumidis	(Australia) Joseph Ensabella	(Australia) Ryan Millier
7	R2	(Victoria (state)) Sandown		**(Australia) No. 63 Eggleston Motorsport**	(Australia) No. 48 M Motorsport	(Australia) No. 64 Aaron Laboratories	(Australia) No. 29 Trofeo Motorsport
7	R2	(Victoria (state)) Sandown		**(Australia) Peter Hackett**	(Australia) Dean Koutsoumidis	(Australia) Joseph Ensabella	(Australia) Ryan Millier
7	R3	(Victoria (state)) Sandown		**(Australia) No. 1 Melbourne Performance Centre**	(Australia) No. 50 M Motorsport	(Australia) No. 64 Aaron Laboratories	(Australia) No. 29 Trofeo Motorsport
7	R3	(Victoria (state)) Sandown		**(Australia) Geoff Emery**	(Australia) David Crampton	(Australia) Joseph Ensabella	(Australia) Ryan Millier

== Championship Standings ==
=== Points system ===
Points were awarded as follows:

Position	**1st**	**2nd**	**3rd**	**4th**	**5th**	**6th**	**7th**	**8th**	**9th**	**10th**	**11th**	**12th**	**13th**	**14th**	**15th**	**16th**	**17th**	**18th**	**19th**	**20th**	**21st**	**22nd**	**23rd**	**24th+**
Qualifying	10	8	7	6	5	4	3	2	1	—N/a														
Round 1	50	44	39	33	31	30	27	25	24	23	22	20	19	18	17	15	14	13	12	10	8	5	2	2
Rounds 2, 7	67	59	51	44	42	40	37	34	32	30	28	27	25	23	22	20	18	17	15	13	10	7	3	3
Round 6	100	88	77	65	65	60	55	50	48	45	43	40	38	35	33	30	28	25	23	20	15	10	5	5
Rounds 3–5	300	265	230	195	190	180	165	150	143	135	128	120	113	105	98	90	83	75	68	60	45	30	15	5

=== Australian GT Championship ===
Pos	Driver	ALB (Victoria (state))					BAR (Western Australia)				PHI (Victoria (state))		BEN (South Australia)		SAN (Victoria (state))		SUR (Queensland)			SAN (Victoria (state))				Points
Pos	Driver	QP	R1	R2	R3	R4	QP	R1	R2	R3	QP	R	QP	R	QP	R	QP	R1	R2	QP	R1	R2	R3	Points
1	(Australia) Geoff Emery	13	4	4	5	4	14	1	2	1	12	1	10	2	14	2	10	5	5	16	5	4	1	1537
2	(Australia) Peter Hackett	12	3	6	1	3	16	2	4	4	10	9	16	**3**	14	1	15	2	3	11	1	1	2	1438
3	(Australia) Garth Tander										12	1	10	2	14	2								868
4	(Australia) Max Twigg	17	**2**	3	2	2	12	3	3	2	12	3	15	4										824
5	(Australia) Fraser Ross (Note: Fraser Ross was ineligible to score championship points at round 1 because he was entered as a Invitational Entry.)	0	1	**2**	6	Ret					17	**2**	14	6	18	**Ret**	20	**3**	1	20	**4**	2	DNS	814
6	(Australia) Liam Talbot												13	1	14	3				6	3	3	3	715
7	(Australia) Ryan Simpson										17	**2**	14	6	18	**Ret**				20	**4**	2	DNS	617
8	(Australia) Tony D'Alberto										12	3	15	4										452
9	(Australia) Dom Storey										10	9	16	**3**										399
10	(Australia) Joseph Ensabella										0	8			14	3								394
11	(Australia) Yasser Shahin (Australia) Jamie Whincup										15	10	12	5										352
12	(Australia) Tony Bates	9	6	8	7	5					4	4								7	Ret	DNS	DNS	343
13	(Australia) Ryan Millier						9	6	5	5							15	1	2					336
14	(New Zealand) Shane van Gisbergen												13	1										313
15	(Australia) Mark Griffith						9	5	6	3										11	2	5	4	298
16	(United Kingdom) Tony Quinn	6	7	Ret	8	7					11	Ret					12	4	4					248
17	(Australia) John Martin										4	4												199
18	(Australia) Vince Muriti (Australia) Luke Youlden										1	5												191
19	(Australia) Craig Baird (Australia) Scott Taylor										4	6	6	Ret										184
20	(Australia) Aaron Deitz (Australia) Cameron McConville										6	7												171
21	(Australia) Richard Gartner (Australia) Hadrian Morrall												4	7										169
22	(Australia) Kenny Habul	16	Ret	1	3	1																		157
23	(Australia) Tim Blanchard										0	8												150
24	(Australia) Peter Major						20	**4**	1	Ret														131
25	(Australia) Lee Partridge	11	9	7	Ret	7																		102
26	(New Zealand) Daniel Gaunt										11	Ret												11
	(Australia) Nick Kelly (Australia) Barton Mawer										0	Ret												0
Pos	Driver	QP	R1	R2	R3	R4	QP	R1	R2	R3	QP	R	QP	R	QP	R	QP	R1	R2	QP	R1	R2	R3	Points
Pos	Driver	ALB (Victoria (state))					BAR (Western Australia)				PHI (Victoria (state))		BEN (South Australia)		SAN (Victoria (state))		SUR (Queensland)			SAN (Victoria (state))				Points

Colour	Result
Gold	Winner
Silver	Second place
Bronze	Third place
Green	Points classification
Blue	Non-points classification
Blue	Non-classified finish (NC)
Purple	Retired, not classified (Ret)
Red	Did not qualify (DNQ)
Red	Did not pre-qualify (DNPQ)
Black	Disqualified (DSQ)
White	Did not start (DNS)
White	Withdrew (WD)
White	Race cancelled (C)
Blank	Did not practice (DNP)
Blank	Did not arrive (DNA)
Blank	Excluded (EX)

Bold - Pole position Notes:

=== Australian Endurance Championship ===
Pos.	Drivers	PHI (Victoria (state))		BEN (South Australia)		SAN (Victoria (state))		Points
Pos.	Drivers	QP	R	QP	R	QP	R	Points
1	(Australia) Geoff Emery (Australia) Garth Tander	12	1	10	2	14	2	868
2	(Australia) Peter Hackett	10	9	16	**3**	14	1	713
3	(Australia) Liam Talbot			13	1	14	3	557
4	(Australia) Fraser Ross (Australia) Ryan Simpson	17	**2**	14	6	18	**Ret**	494
5	(Australia) Tony D'Alberto (Australia) Max Twigg	12	3	15	4			452
6	(Australia) Dom Storey	10	9	16	**3**			399
7	(Australia) Joseph Ensabella	0	8			14	3	394
8	(Australia) Yasser Shahin (Australia) Jamie Whincup	15	10	12	5			352
9	(New Zealand) Shane van Gisbergen			13	1			313
10	(Australia) Tony Bates (Australia) John Martin	4	4					199
11	(New Zealand) Craig Baird (Australia) Scott Taylor	4	6	6	Ret			190
12	(Australia) Vince Muriti (Australia) Luke Youlden	1	5					191
13	(Australia) Aaron Deitz (Australia) Cameron McConville	5	7					171
14	(Australia) Richard Gartner (Australia) Hadrian Morrall			4	7			169
15	(Australia) Tim Blanchard	0	8					150
16	(New Zealand) Daniel Gaunt (United Kingdom) Tony Quinn	11	Ret					11
	(Australia) Nick Kelly (Australia) Barton Mawer	0	Ret					0
Pos.	Drivers	QP	R	QP	R	QP	R	Points
Pos.	Drivers	PHI (Victoria (state))		BEN (South Australia)		SAN (Victoria (state))		Points

=== Australian GT4 Championship ===
Pos	Driver	ALB (Victoria (state))					BAR (Western Australia)				PHI (Victoria (state))		BEN (South Australia)		SAN (Victoria (state))		SUR (Queensland)			SAN (Victoria (state))				Points
Pos	Driver	QP	R1	R2	R3	R4	QP	R1	R2	R3	QP	R	QP	R	QP	R	QP	R1	R2	QP	R1	R2	R3	Points
1	(Australia) Justin McMillan (Australia) Glen Wood	18	**1**	3	1	3	20	**1**	1	1	20	**1**	20	**2**	18	**1**	18	**1**	2					1546
2	(Australia) David Crampton	11	4	Ret	3	5	16	2	2	2	16	Ret	16	1	15	2				8	2	2	1	1112
3	(Australia) Trent Harrison	11	4	Ret	3	5					16	Ret	16	1	15	2	18	2	1					932
4	(Australia) Ryan Simpson	18	2	**1**	2	1																		206
5	(Australia) Dean Koutsoumidis																			10	**1**	1	DNS	144
6	(Australia) Mark Griffith	14	3	2	Ret	2																		141
7	(Australia) Victor Zagame	11	5	4	4	4																		141
8	(Australia) Todd O'Brien																14	3	Ret					91
9	(Australia) Christian Fitzgerald (United Kingdom) Michael O'Brien														17	Ret								17
Pos	Driver	QP	R1	R2	R3	R4	QP	R1	R2	R3	QP	R	QP	R	QP	R	QP	R1	R2	QP	R1	R2	R3	Points
Pos	Driver	ALB (Victoria (state))					BAR (Western Australia)				PHI (Victoria (state))		BEN (South Australia)		SAN (Victoria (state))		SUR (Queensland)			SAN (Victoria (state))				Points

=== Australian GT Trophy Series ===
Pos	Driver	ALB (Victoria (state))					BAR (Western Australia)				SUR (Queensland)			SAN (Victoria (state))				Points
Pos	Driver	QP	R1	R2	R3	R4	QP	R1	R2	R3	QP	R1	R2	QP	R1	R2	R3	Points
1	(Australia) Dale Paterson	11	5	5	5	5	14	2	2	1	20	**2**	1	0	2	2	DNS	660
2	(Australia) Joseph Ensabella	6	7	Ret	4	7	10	4	4	3	15	1	Ret	10	**1**	1	1	579
3	(Australia) Ryan How	17	1	**1**	1	1	20	**1**	1	Ret								371
4	(Australia) Richard Gartner	8	6	Ret	3	6	14	5	3	2	15	Ret	3					365
5	(Australia) John Morriss	17	**3**	2	2	3												183
6	(Australia) Scott Taylor	11	4	3	Ret	4	14	3	Ret	DNS								181
7	(Australia) Peter Corbett										12	3	2					177
8	(Australia) Nick Kelly	16	2	4	Ret	2												137
Pos	Driver	QP	R1	R2	R3	R4	QP	R1	R2	R3	QP	R1	R2	QP	R1	R2	R3	Points
Pos	Driver	ALB (Victoria (state))					BAR (Western Australia)				SUR (Queensland)			SAN (Victoria (state))				Points

=== Trofeo Challenge ===
Pos	Driver	ALB (Victoria (state))					BAR (Western Australia)				SUR (Queensland)			SAN (Victoria (state))				Points
Pos	Driver	QP	R1	R2	R3	R4	QP	R1	R2	R3	QP	R1	R2	QP	R1	R2	R3	Points
1	(Australia) Nick Karnaros	18	1	**2**	1	2	20	**1**	1	1	10	5	4	8	2	2	2	750
2	(Australia) Jim Manolios	10	3	4	2	4	16	2	2	2								355
3	(Australia) David Greig	12	2	3	4	3								7	3	3	3	327
4	(Australia) Ryan Millier													10	**1**	1	1	211
5	(Australia) Adam Hargraves										12	2	1					200
6	(Australia) Geoff Taunton										15	1	3					192
7	(Australia) Shane Barwood	15	4	1	3	1												187
8	(Australia) Broc Feeney										20	**3**	2					185
9	(Australia) Bayley Hall										15	4	Ret					80
10	(Australia) Chris Seidler (Australia) Luke Seidler	17	**Ret**	DNS	DNS	DNS												17
Pos	Driver	QP	R1	R2	R3	R4	QP	R1	R2	R3	QP	R1	R2	QP	R1	R2	R3	Points
Pos	Driver	ALB (Victoria (state))					BAR (Western Australia)				SUR (Queensland)			SAN (Victoria (state))				Points
