= 2018 Australian GT Championship =

Motor racing competition

The 2018 Australian GT Championship was the 22nd running of the Australian GT Championship, a CAMS-sanctioned Australian motor racing championship open to FIA GT3 cars and similar cars as approved for the championship. The championship commenced on 23 March 2018 at the Melbourne Grand Prix Circuit and concluded on 14 October at Hampton Downs Motorsport Park. The 2018 Australian Endurance Championship was contested concurrently with Rounds 2, 4 and 6 of the GT Championship. It was the 15th Australian Endurance Championship.

The Australian GT Championship was won by Geoff Emery driving an Audi R8 LMS and the Australian Endurance Championship by Max Twigg and Tony D'Alberto who shared a Mercedes-AMG GT3.

== Race calendar ==
The Australian GT Championship was contested over six rounds and the Australian Endurance Championship over three rounds. Each race, with the exception of the Australian Grand Prix round of the Australian GT Championship, included at least one compulsory timed pit stop.

Australian GT Championship

| Round | Circuit | Location | Race format | Date |
|---|---|---|---|---|
| 1 | Melbourne Grand Prix Circuit | Melbourne, Victoria | 4 x 25 min | 23–25 March |
| 2 | The Bend Motorsport Park | Tailem Bend, South Australia | 1 x 86 laps | 14–15 April |
| 3 | Sandown Raceway | Melbourne, Victoria | 3 x 40 min | 12–13 May |
| 4 | Phillip Island Grand Prix Circuit | Phillip Island, Victoria | 1 x 101 laps | 2–3 June |
| 5 | Sydney Motorsport Park | Eastern Creek, New South Wales | 3 x 40 min | 4–5 August |
| 6 | Hampton Downs Motorsport Park | Waikato, New Zealand | 1 x 101 laps | 13–14 October |

Australian Endurance Championship

| Round | Circuit | Location | Race format | Date |
|---|---|---|---|---|
| 1 | The Bend Motorsport Park | Tailem Bend, South Australia | 1 x 86 laps | 14–15 April |
| 2 | Phillip Island Grand Prix Circuit | Phillip Island, Victoria | 1 x 101 laps | 2–3 June |
| 3 | Hampton Downs Motorsport Park | Waikato, New Zealand | 1 x 101 laps | 13–14 October |

== Australian GT Championship ==
=== Teams and drivers ===
| Team | Vehicle | No. | Drivers | Events |
|---|---|---|---|---|
| JAMEC PEM Racing | Audi R8 LMS | 1 | (Australia) Geoff Emery | 1-5 |
| JAMEC PEM Racing | Audi R8 LMS | 1 | (Switzerland) Marcel Fässler | 1 |
| JAMEC PEM Racing | Audi R8 LMS | 1 | (Australia) Garth Tander | 2, 4 |
| Ah Apartments | Audi R8 LMS | 3 | (Australia) Ash Samadi | 1–2, 4 |
| Ah Apartments | Audi R8 LMS | 3 | (Australia) Dylan O'Keeffe | 2, 4 |
| Wall Racing | Lamborghini Huracán GT3 | 6 | (Australia) Adrian Deitz | 2, 4-5 |
| Wall Racing | Lamborghini Huracán GT3 | 6 | (Australia) Cameron McConville | 2, 4-5 |
| Darrell Lea/Keltic Racing | McLaren 650S GT3 | 7 | (United Kingdom) Tony Quinn | 1-5 |
| Darrell Lea/Keltic Racing | McLaren 650S GT3 | 7 | (New Zealand) Shane van Gisbergen | 2 |
| Darrell Lea/Keltic Racing | McLaren 650S GT3 | 7 | (Australia) Grant Denyer | 4 |
| Scott Taylor Motorsport | Mercedes-AMG GT3 | 8 | (Australia) Max Twigg | 1–2, 4 |
| Scott Taylor Motorsport | Mercedes-AMG GT3 | 8 | (Australia) Tony D'Alberto | 1–2, 4 |
| Scott Taylor Motorsport | Mercedes-AMG GT3 | 222 | (Australia) Scott Taylor | 1-5 |
| Scott Taylor Motorsport | Mercedes-AMG GT3 | 222 | (New Zealand) Craig Baird | 1–2, 4 |
| Hallmarc Constructions | Audi R8 LMS | 9 | (Australia) Marc Cini | 3 |
| International Motorsport | Audi R8 LMS | 10 | (New Zealand) Andrew Fawcett | 4 |
| International Motorsport | Audi R8 LMS | 10 | (New Zealand) Jonny Reid | 4 |
| Objective Racing | McLaren 650S GT3 | 11 | (Australia) Tony Walls | 2, 4 |
| Objective Racing | McLaren 650S GT3 | 11 | (Australia) Warren Luff | 2, 4 |
| Erebus Motorsport; Griffith Corporation/ Aussie Driver Search | Mercedes-AMG GT3 | 19 | (Australia) Mark Griffith | 3, 5 |
| Erebus Motorsport; Griffith Corporation/ Aussie Driver Search | Mercedes-AMG GT3 | 98 | (Australia) Jaie Robson | 1-3 |
| Erebus Motorsport; Griffith Corporation/ Aussie Driver Search | Mercedes-AMG GT3 | 98 | (Australia) David Reynolds | 2 |
| KFC Racing | Audi R8 LMS | 24 | (Australia) Tony Bates | 1-5 |
| KFC Racing | Audi R8 LMS | 24 | (New Zealand) Daniel Gaunt | 1–2, 4 |
| Trofeo Motorsport | Lamborghini Huracán GT3 | 29 | (Australia) Jim Manolios | 1–3, 5 |
| Trofeo Motorsport | Lamborghini Huracán GT3 | 29 | (Australia) Dean Canto | 1-2 |
| M Motorsport | Lamborghini Gallardo R-EX | 49 | (Australia) Dean Koutsoumidis | 3, 5 |
| M Motorsport | Lamborghini Gallardo R-EX | 49 | (Australia) Glen Wood | 3 |
| M Motorsport | Lamborghini Gallardo R-EX | 49 | (Australia) Justin McMillan | 5 |
| McElrea Racing | McLaren 650S GT3 | 58 | (Australia) Duvashen Padayachee | 4 |
| McElrea Racing | McLaren 650S GT3 | 58 | (New Zealand) Shane van Gisbergen | 4 |
| McElrea Racing | McLaren 650S GT3 | 59 | (Australia) Fraser Ross | 1-5 |
| McElrea Racing | McLaren 650S GT3 | 59 | (Australia) Duvashen Padayachee | 2 |
| McElrea Racing | McLaren 650S GT3 | 59 | (New Zealand) Jaxon Evans | 4 |
| Eggleston Motorsport | Mercedes-AMG GT3 | 63 | (Australia) Peter Hackett | 1-5 |
| Eggleston Motorsport | Mercedes-AMG GT3 | 63 | (New Zealand) Dominic Storey | 1 |
| Eggleston Motorsport | Mercedes-AMG GT3 | 63 | (Australia) Jake Fouracre | 2, 4 |
| Eggleston Motorsport | Mercedes-AMG GT3 | 777 | (Australia) Yasser Shahin | 2, 4-5 |
| Eggleston Motorsport | Mercedes-AMG GT3 | 777 | (Australia) Luke Youlden | 2, 4 |
| Maranello Motorsport | Ferrari 488 GT3 | 88 | (Australia) Peter Edwards | 1 |
| Maranello Motorsport | Ferrari 488 GT3 | 88 | (Italy) Giancarlo Fisichella | 1 |
| Miedecke Motorsport | Aston Martin V12 Vantage GT3 | 95 | (Australia) Andrew Miedecke | 5 |
| Miedecke Motorsport | Aston Martin V12 Vantage GT3 | 95 | (Australia) George Miedecke | 5 |
| Hobson Motorsport | Nissan GT-R Nismo GT3 | 96 | (Australia) Brett Hobson | 5 |
| BMW Team SRM | BMW M6 GT3 | 100 | (New Zealand) Steven Richards | 1-5 |
| BMW Team SRM | BMW M6 GT3 | 100 | (Australia) Dean Grant | 1 |
| BMW Team SRM | BMW M6 GT3 | 100 | (Australia) Michael Almond | 2, 4 |
| BMW Team SRM | BMW M6 GT3 | 100 | (Australia) Ricky Capo | 3, 5 |
| Walkinshaw Racing | Porsche 911 GT3-R | 911 | (Australia) Liam Talbot | 1-5 |
| Walkinshaw Racing | Porsche 911 GT3-R | 911 | (Australia) John Martin | 1–2, 4 |

=== Race results ===
| Round | | Circuit | Pole position | Race winner(s) |
|---|---|---|---|---|
| 1 | R1 | Albert Park | No. 222 Scott Taylor Motorsport | No. 222 Scott Taylor Motorsport |
| 1 | R1 | Albert Park | (Australia) Scott Taylor (New Zealand) Craig Baird | (Australia) Scott Taylor (New Zealand) Craig Baird |
| 1 | R2 | Albert Park | No. 59 McEldra Racing | No. 98 Aussie Driver Search |
| 1 | R2 | Albert Park | (Australia) Fraser Ross | (Australia) Jaie Robson |
| 1 | R3 | Albert Park | | No. 222 Scott Taylor Motorsport |
| 1 | R3 | Albert Park | | (Australia) Scott Taylor (New Zealand) Craig Baird |
| 1 | R4 | Albert Park | | No. 98 Aussie Driver Search |
| 1 | R4 | Albert Park | | (Australia) Jaie Robson |
| 2 | R | The Bend | No. 8 Scott Taylor Motorsport | No. 8 Scott Taylor Motorsport |
| 2 | R | The Bend | (Australia) Max Twigg (Australia) Tony D'Alberto | (Australia) Max Twigg (Australia) Tony D'Alberto |
| 3 | R1 | Sandown | No. 49 M Motorsport | No. 63 Eggleston Motorsport |
| 3 | R1 | Sandown | (Australia) Dean Koutsoumidis (Australia) Glen Wood | (Australia) Peter Hackett |
| 3 | R2 | Sandown | No. 98 Aussie Driver Search | No. 24 KFC Racing |
| 3 | R2 | Sandown | (Australia) Jaie Robson | (Australia) Tony Bates |
| 3 | R3 | Sandown | | No. 1 JAMEC PEM Racing |
| 3 | R3 | Sandown | | (Australia) Geoff Emery |
| 4 | R | Phillip Island | No. 911 Walkinshaw Racing | No. 24 KFC Racing |
| 4 | R | Phillip Island | (Australia) Liam Talbot (Australia) John Martin | (Australia) Tony Bates (New Zealand) Daniel Gaunt |
| 5 | R1 | Sydney | No. 63 Eggleston Motorsport | No. 911 Walkinshaw Racing |
| 5 | R1 | Sydney | (Australia) Peter Hackett | (Australia) Liam Talbot |
| 5 | R2 | Sydney | No. 63 Eggleston Motorsport | No. 911 Walkinshaw Racing |
| 5 | R2 | Sydney | (Australia) Peter Hackett | (Australia) Liam Talbot |
| 5 | R3 | Sydney | | No. 63 Eggleston Motorsport |
| 5 | R3 | Sydney | | (Australia) Peter Hackett |
| 6 | R | Hampton Downs | | No. 1 Valvoline |
| 6 | R | Hampton Downs | | (Australia) Geoff Emery (Australia) Garth Tander |

=== Points system ===
Points were awarded as follows:

| Position | **1st** | **2nd** | **3rd** | **4th** | **5th** | **6th** | **7th** | **8th** | **9th** | **10th** | **11th** | **12th** | **13th** | **14th** | **15th** | **16th** | **17th** | **18th** | **19th** | **20th** | **21st** | **22nd** | **23rd** | **24th+** |
| Qualifying session | 10 | 8 | 7 | 6 | 5 | 4 | 3 | 2 | 1 | | | | | | | | | | | | | | | |
| Round 1 R1 | 25 | 21 | 18 | 15 | 13 | 10 | 9 | 8 | 7 | 6 | 6 | 5 | 5 | 4 | 3 | 3 | 2 | 2 | 2 | 2 | 1 | 1 | 1 | 1 |
| Round 1 R2 | 45 | 38 | 32 | 27 | 23 | 18 | 16 | 14 | 13 | 11 | 10 | 9 | 8 | 7 | 5 | 5 | 4 | 4 | 3 | 3 | 2 | 2 | 1 | 1 |
| Round 1 R3 | 50 | 42 | 35 | 30 | 25 | 20 | 18 | 16 | 14 | 12 | 11 | 10 | 9 | 8 | 6 | 5 | 4 | 4 | 3 | 3 | 2 | 2 | 1 | 1 |
| Round 1 R4 | 80 | 67 | 56 | 48 | 40 | 32 | 29 | 26 | 22 | 19 | 18 | 16 | 14 | 13 | 10 | 8 | 6 | 6 | 5 | 5 | 3 | 3 | 1 | 1 |
| Rounds 3, 5 | 67 | 56 | 47 | 40 | 33 | 27 | 24 | 21 | 19 | 16 | 15 | 13 | 12 | 10 | 8 | 7 | 6 | 5 | 5 | 4 | 3 | 3 | 3 | 3 |
| Rounds 2, 4, 6 | 300 | 265 | 230 | 195 | 190 | 180 | 165 | 150 | 143 | 135 | 128 | 120 | 113 | 105 | 98 | 90 | 83 | 75 | 68 | 60 | 45 | 30 | 15 | 5 |

=== Championship standings ===
The Australian GT Championship was won by Geoff Emery.

Championship standings **after five of six rounds** were as follows:

| Pos | Driver | ALB (Victoria (state)) | | | | | | BEN (South Australia) | | | SAN (Victoria (state)) | | | | | PHI (Victoria (state)) | | | SMP (New South Wales) | | | | | HAM (New Zealand) | | | Pts |
| Pos | Driver | R1 | R2 | R3 | R4 | QP | RP | R | QP | RP | R1 | R2 | R3 | QP | RP | R | QP | RP | R1 | R2 | R3 | QP | RP | R | QP | RP | Pts |
|---|---|---|---|---|---|---|---|---|---|---|---|---|---|---|---|---|---|---|---|---|---|---|---|---|---|---|---|
| 1 | Fraser Ross | 9 | 2 | 7 | 3 | 10 | 129 | 5 | 6 | 196 | 3 | 2 | 2 | 8 | 167 | 6 | 5 | 185 | 3 | 4 | 3 | 14 | 148 | | | | 825 |
| 2 | Peter Hackett | 7 | 3 | 6 | 2 | 7 | 135 | 6 | 13 | 193 | 1 | 6 | 4 | 12 | 146 | 11 | 7 | 135 | 2 | 2 | 1 | 20 | 199 | | | | 808 |
| 3 | Geoff Emery | 3 | 5 | 2 | 5 | 12 | 135 | 12 | 5 | 125 | 2 | 4 | 1 | 12 | 175 | 5 | 14 | 204 | 4 | 3 | 4 | 7 | 134 | | | | 773 |
| 4 | Liam Talbot | 5 | 6 | 3 | 4 | 6 | 120 | 2 | 17 | 282 | 4 | 3 | 3 | 15 | 149 | Ret | 15 | 15 | 1 | 1 | 2 | 12 | 202 | | | | 768 |
| 5 | Steven Richards | 6 | 11 | 5 | 11 | 1 | 64 | 3 | 5 | 235 | 7 | 13 | 10 | 10 | 62 | 2 | 15 | 280 | 6 | 7 | 5 | 12 | 96 | | | | 737 |
| 6 | Tony Bates | Ret | 7 | 10 | 7 | 7 | 64 | 4 | 3 | 198 | 8 | 1 | 12 | 6 | 107 | 1 | 11 | 311 | 7 | DNS | 9 | 3 | 46 | | | | 726 |
| 7 | Max Twigg; Tony D'Alberto | 4 | 4 | Ret | 6 | 15 | 89 | 1 | 15 | 315 | | | | | | 3 | 6 | 236 | | | | | | | | | 640 |
| 8 | Daniel Gaunt | Ret | 7 | 10 | 7 | 7 | 64 | 4 | 3 | 198 | | | | | | 1 | 11 | 311 | | | | | | | | | 573 |
| 9 | Scott Taylor | 1 | 9 | 1 | 8 | 12 | 126 | 10 | 0 | 135 | Ret | 8 | 7 | 0 | 45 | 7 | 2 | 167 | 13 | 8 | 10 | 1 | 50 | | | | 523 |
| 10 | Michael Almond | | | | | | | 3 | 5 | 235 | | | | | | 2 | 15 | 280 | | | | | | | | | 515 |
| 11 | Craig Baird | 1 | 9 | 1 | 8 | 12 | 126 | 10 | 0 | 135 | | | | | | 7 | 2 | 167 | | | | | | | | | 428 |
| 12 | John Martin | 5 | 6 | 3 | 4 | 6 | 120 | 2 | 17 | 282 | | | | | | Ret | 15 | 15 | | | | | | | | | 417 |
| 13 | Jaie Robson | 8 | 1 | 8 | 1 | 7 | 156 | 14 | 9 | 114 | 5 | 5 | 6 | 14 | 117 | | | | | | | | | | | | 387 |
| 14 | Adrian Deitz; Cameron McConville | | | | | | | 8 | 0 | 150 | | | | | | 8 | 4 | 154 | 8 | 10 | 13 | 7 | 56 | | | | 360 |
| 15 | Yasser Shahin | | | | | | | 15 | 14 | 112 | | | | | | 10 | 2 | 137 | 5 | 5 | 7 | 9 | 99 | | | | 348 |
| 16 | Garth Tander | | | | | | | 12 | 5 | 125 | | | | | | 5 | 14 | 204 | | | | | | | | | 329 |
| 17 | Jake Fouracre | | | | | | | 6 | 13 | 193 | | | | | | 11 | 7 | 135 | | | | | | | | | 328 |
| 18 | Duvashen Padayachee | | | | | | | 5 | 6 | 196 | | | | | | 12 | 0 | 120 | | | | | | | | | 316 |
| 19 | Tony Walls; Warren Luff | | | | | | | 7 | 0 | 165 | | | | | | 9 | 0 | 143 | | | | | | | | | 308 |
| 20 | Ash Samadi | 12 | 10 | Ret | DNS | 4 | 20 | 9 | 0 | 143 | | | | | | 13 | 10 | 123 | | | | | | | | | 286 |
| 21 | Tony Quinn | 10 | 8 | 9 | 9 | 56 | 128 | 11 | 1 | 129 | 10 | 11 | 9 | 4 | 54 | Ret | 0 | 0 | Ret | 9 | 12 | 0 | 32 | | | | 239 |
| 22 | Dylan O'Keeffe | | | | | | | 9 | 0 | 143 | | | | | | 13 | 10 | 123 | | | | | | | | | 266 |
| 23 | Shane van Gisbergen | | | | | | | 11 | 1 | 129 | | | | | | 12 | 0 | 120 | | | | | | | | | 249 |
| 24 | Luke Youlden | | | | | | | 15 | 14 | 112 | | | | | | 10 | 2 | 137 | | | | | | | | | 249 |
| 25 | Jim Mangolios | 11 | 13 | 11 | 12 | 3 | 44 | 13 | 4 | 117 | 12 | 12 | 11 | 0 | 41 | | | | 12 | 12 | 14 | 0 | 36 | | | | 238 |
| 26 | Andrew Fawcett; Jonny Reid | | | | | | | | | | | | | | | 4 | 1 | 196 | | | | | | | | | 196 |
| 27 | Jaxon Evans | | | | | | | | | | | | | | | 6 | 5 | 185 | | | | | | | | | 185 |
| 28 | Dean Canto | 11 | 13 | 11 | 12 | 3 | 44 | 13 | 4 | 117 | | | | | | | | | | | | | | | | | 161 |
| 29 | Ricky Capo | | | | | | | | | | 7 | 13 | 10 | 10 | 62 | | | | 6 | 7 | 5 | 12 | 96 | | | | 158 |
| 30 | Marcel Fassler | 3 | 5 | 2 | 5 | 12 | 135 | | | | | | | | | | | | | | | | | | | | 135 |
| 31 | Dominic Storey | 7 | 3 | 6 | 2 | 7 | 135 | | | | | | | | | | | | | | | | | | | | 135 |
| 32 | Mark Griffith | | | | | | | | | | 9 | 7 | 5 | 1 | 77 | | | | 10 | 11 | 8 | 0 | 52 | | | | 129 |
| 33 | David Reynolds | | | | | | | 14 | 9 | 114 | | | | | | | | | | | | | | | | | 114 |
| 34 | Peter Edwards; Giancarlo Fisichella | 2 | 12 | 4 | 10 | 8 | 87 | | | | | | | | | | | | | | | | | | | | 87 |
| 35 | Dean Koutsoumidis | | | | | | | | | | 6 | 10 | Ret | 10 | 53 | | | | 11 | DNS | DNS | 0 | 15 | | | | 68 |
| 36 | Dean Grant | 6 | 11 | 5 | 11 | 1 | 64 | | | | | | | | | | | | | | | | | | | | 64 |
| 37 | Brett Hobson | | | | | | | | | | | | | | | | | | 9 | 6 | 11 | 3 | 64 | | | | 64 |
| 38 | Marc Cini | | | | | | | | | | 11 | 9 | 8 | 0 | 55 | | | | | | | | | | | | 55 |
| 39 | Glen Wood | | | | | | | | | | 6 | 10 | Ret | 10 | 53 | | | | | | | | | | | | 53 |
| 40 | Andrew Miedecke; George Miedecke | | | | | | | | | | | | | | | | | | DNS | DSQ | 6 | 4 | 31 | | | | 31 |
| 41 | Justin McMillan | | | | | | | | | | | | | | | | | | 11 | DNS | DNS | 0 | 15 | | | | 15 |
| 42 | Grant Denyer | | | | | | | | | | | | | | | Ret | 0 | 0 | | | | | | | | | 0 |
| Pos | Driver | R1 | R2 | R3 | R4 | QP | RP | R | QP | RP | R1 | R2 | R3 | QP | RP | R | QP | RP | R1 | R2 | R3 | QP | RP | R | QP | RP | Pts |
| Pos | Driver | ALB (Victoria (state)) | | | | | | BEN (South Australia) | | | SAN (Victoria (state)) | | | | | PHI (Victoria (state)) | | | SMP (New South Wales) | | | | | HAM (New Zealand) | | | Pts |

| Colour | Result |
|---|---|
| Gold | Winner |
| Silver | Second place |
| Bronze | Third place |
| Green | Points classification |
| Blue | Non-points classification |
| Blue | Non-classified finish (NC) |
| Purple | Retired, not classified (Ret) |
| Red | Did not qualify (DNQ) |
| Red | Did not pre-qualify (DNPQ) |
| Black | Disqualified (DSQ) |
| White | Did not start (DNS) |
| White | Withdrew (WD) |
| White | Race cancelled (C) |
| Blank | Did not practice (DNP) |
| Blank | Did not arrive (DNA) |
| Blank | Excluded (EX) |

**Bold** - Pole position
Italics - Fastest lap

=== Australian GT4 standings ===
The GT4 Division was won by Jeremy Gray driving an Aston Martin Vantage.

== Australian Endurance Championship ==
=== Teams and drivers ===
| Team | Vehicle | No. | Drivers | Events |
|---|---|---|---|---|
| JAMEC PEM Racing | Audi R8 LMS | 1 | (Australia) Geoff Emery | All |
| JAMEC PEM Racing | Audi R8 LMS | 1 | (Australia) Garth Tander | All |
| Ah Apartments | Audi R8 LMS | 3 | (Australia) Ash Samadi | All |
| Ah Apartments | Audi R8 LMS | 3 | (Australia) Dylan O'Keeffe | All |
| Wall Racing | Lamborghini Huracán GT3 | 6 | (Australia) Adrian Deitz | All |
| Wall Racing | Lamborghini Huracán GT3 | 6 | (Australia) Cameron McConville | All |
| Darrell Lea/Keltic Racing | McLaren 650S GT3 | 7 | (United Kingdom) Tony Quinn | All |
| Darrell Lea/Keltic Racing | McLaren 650S GT3 | 7 | (New Zealand) Shane van Gisbergen | 1 |
| Darrell Lea/Keltic Racing | McLaren 650S GT3 | 7 | (Australia) Grant Denyer | 2 |
| Scott Taylor Motorsport | Mercedes-AMG GT3 | 8 | (Australia) Max Twigg | All |
| Scott Taylor Motorsport | Mercedes-AMG GT3 | 8 | (Australia) Tony D'Alberto | All |
| Scott Taylor Motorsport | Mercedes-AMG GT3 | 222 | (Australia) Scott Taylor | All |
| Scott Taylor Motorsport | Mercedes-AMG GT3 | 222 | (New Zealand) Craig Baird | All |
| International Motorsport | Audi R8 LMS | 10 | (Australia) Andrew Fawcett | 2 |
| International Motorsport | Audi R8 LMS | 10 | (New Zealand) Jonny Reid | 2 |
| Objective Racing | McLaren 650S GT3 | 11 | (Australia) Tony Walls | All |
| Objective Racing | McLaren 650S GT3 | 11 | (Australia) Warren Luff | All |
| KFC Racing | Audi R8 LMS | 24 | (Australia) Tony Bates | All |
| KFC Racing | Audi R8 LMS | 24 | (New Zealand) Daniel Gaunt | All |
| Trofeo Motorsport | Lamborghini Huracán GT3 | 29 | (Australia) Jim Manolios | 1 |
| Trofeo Motorsport | Lamborghini Huracán GT3 | 29 | (Australia) Dean Canto | 1 |
| McElrea Racing | McLaren 650S GT3 | 58 | (Australia) Duvashen Padayachee | 2 |
| McElrea Racing | McLaren 650S GT3 | 58 | (New Zealand) Shane van Gisbergen | 2 |
| McElrea Racing | McLaren 650S GT3 | 59 | (Australia) Fraser Ross | All |
| McElrea Racing | McLaren 650S GT3 | 59 | (Australia) Duvashen Padayachee | 1 |
| McElrea Racing | McLaren 650S GT3 | 59 | (New Zealand) Jaxon Evans | 2 |
| Eggleston Motorsport | Mercedes-AMG GT3 | 63 | (Australia) Peter Hackett | All |
| Eggleston Motorsport | Mercedes-AMG GT3 | 63 | (Australia) Jake Fouracre | All |
| Eggleston Motorsport | Mercedes-AMG GT3 | 777 | (Australia) Yasser Shahin | All |
| Eggleston Motorsport | Mercedes-AMG GT3 | 777 | (Australia) Luke Youlden | All |
| Erebus Motorsport; Aussie Driver Search | Mercedes-AMG GT3 | 98 | (Australia) Jaie Robson | 1 |
| Erebus Motorsport; Aussie Driver Search | Mercedes-AMG GT3 | 98 | (Australia) David Reynolds | 1 |
| BMW Team SRM | BMW M6 GT3 | 100 | (New Zealand) Steven Richards | All |
| BMW Team SRM | BMW M6 GT3 | 100 | (Australia) Michael Almond | All |
| Walkinshaw Racing | Porsche 911 GT3-R | 911 | (Australia) Liam Talbot | All |
| Walkinshaw Racing | Porsche 911 GT3-R | 911 | (Australia) John Martin | All |

=== Race results ===
| Round | Circuit | Pole position | Race winner |
|---|---|---|---|
| 1 | The Bend | No. 8 Scott Taylor Motorsport | No. 8 Scott Taylor Motorsport |
| 1 | The Bend | (Australia) Max Twigg (Australia) Tony D'Alberto | (Australia) Max Twigg (Australia) Tony D'Alberto |
| 2 | Phillip Island | No. 911 Walkinshaw Racing | No. 24 KFC Racing |
| 2 | Phillip Island | (Australia) Liam Talbot (Australia) John Martin | (Australia) Tony Bates (New Zealand) Daniel Gaunt |
| 3 | Hampton Downs | | No. 1 Valvoline |
| 3 | Hampton Downs | | (Australia) Geoff Emery (Australia) Garth Tander |

=== Points system ===
Points are awarded as follows:

| Position | **1st** | **2nd** | **3rd** | **4th** | **5th** | **6th** | **7th** | **8th** | **9th** | **10th** | **11th** | **12th** | **13th** | **14th** | **15th** | **16th** | **17th** | **18th** | **19th** | **20th** | **21st** | **22nd** | **23rd** | **24th+** |
| Qualifying session | 10 | 8 | 7 | 6 | 5 | 4 | 3 | 2 | 1 | | | | | | | | | | | | | | | |
| Rounds | 300 | 265 | 230 | 195 | 190 | 180 | 165 | 150 | 143 | 135 | 128 | 120 | 113 | 105 | 98 | 90 | 83 | 75 | 68 | 60 | 45 | 30 | 15 | 5 |

=== Championship standings ===
The Australian Endurance Championship was won by Max Twigg and Tony D'Alberto.

Championship standings **after two of three rounds** were as follows:

| Pos | Driver | BEN (South Australia) | | | PHI (Victoria (state)) | | | HAM (New Zealand) | | | Pts |
| Pos | Driver | R | QP | RP | R | QP | RP | R | QP | RP | Pts |
|---|---|---|---|---|---|---|---|---|---|---|---|
| 1 | Max Twigg; Tony D'Alberto | 1 | 15 | 315 | 3 | 6 | 236 | | | | 551 |
| 2 | Steven Richards; Michael Almond | 3 | 5 | 235 | 2 | 15 | 280 | | | | 515 |
| 3 | Tony Bates; Daniel Gaunt | 4 | 3 | 198 | 1 | 11 | 311 | | | | 509 |
| 4 | Fraser Ross | 5 | 6 | 196 | 6 | 5 | 185 | | | | 381 |
| 5 | Geoff Emery; Garth Tander | 12 | 5 | 125 | 5 | 14 | 204 | | | | 329 |
| 6 | Peter Hackett; Jake Fouracre | 6 | 13 | 193 | 11 | 7 | 135 | | | | 328 |
| 7 | Duvashen Padayachee | 5 | 6 | 196 | 12 | 0 | 120 | | | | 316 |
| 8 | Tony Walls; Warren Luff | 7 | 0 | 165 | 9 | 0 | 143 | | | | 308 |
| 9 | Adrian Deitz; Cameron McConville | 8 | 0 | 150 | 8 | 4 | 154 | | | | 304 |
| 10 | Scott Taylor; Craig Baird | 10 | 0 | 135 | 7 | 2 | 167 | | | | 302 |
| 11 | Liam Talbot; John Martin | 2 | 17 | 282 | Ret | 15 | 15 | | | | 297 |
| 12 | Ash Samadi; Dylan O'Keeffe | 9 | 0 | 143 | 13 | 10 | 123 | | | | 266 |
| 13 | Yasser Shahin; Luke Youlden | 15 | 14 | 112 | 10 | 2 | 137 | | | | 249 |
| 14 | Shane van Gisbergen | 11 | 1 | 129 | 12 | 0 | 120 | | | | 249 |
| 15 | Andrew Fawcett; Jonny Reid | | | | 4 | 1 | 196 | | | | 196 |
| 16 | Jaxon Evans | | | | 6 | 5 | 185 | | | | 185 |
| 17 | Tony Quinn | 11 | 1 | 129 | Ret | 0 | 0 | | | | 129 |
| 18 | Jim Manolios; Dean Canto | 13 | 4 | 117 | | | | | | | 117 |
| 19 | Jaie Robson; David Reynolds | 14 | 9 | 114 | | | | | | | 114 |
| 20 | Grant Denyer | | | | Ret | 0 | 0 | | | | 0 |
| Pos | Driver | R | QP | RP | R | QP | RP | R | QP | RP | Pts |
| Pos | Driver | BEN (South Australia) | | | PHI (Victoria (state)) | | | HAM (New Zealand) | | | Pts |

| Colour | Result |
|---|---|
| Gold | Winner |
| Silver | Second place |
| Bronze | Third place |
| Green | Points classification |
| Blue | Non-points classification |
| Blue | Non-classified finish (NC) |
| Purple | Retired, not classified (Ret) |
| Red | Did not qualify (DNQ) |
| Red | Did not pre-qualify (DNPQ) |
| Black | Disqualified (DSQ) |
| White | Did not start (DNS) |
| White | Withdrew (WD) |
| White | Race cancelled (C) |
| Blank | Did not practice (DNP) |
| Blank | Did not arrive (DNA) |
| Blank | Excluded (EX) |

**Bold** - Pole position
Italics - Fastest lap

== See also ==
- 2018 Australian GT Trophy Series
