= Tasmanian Super Prix =

- Symmons Plains Raceway

Race information
- Number of times held: 4
- First held: 2006
- Last held: 2010
- Most wins (drivers): no repeat winners
- Most wins (constructors): Dallara (4)
- Circuit length: 2.41 km (1.5 miles)
- Race length: 72.3 km (45 miles)
- Laps: 30

Last race (2010)

Pole position
- (New Zealand) Andrew Waite; Team BRM; 15:43.2671 (winning Race 2)

Podium
- 1. (Australia) Tom Tweedie; Team Tom; 26:08.3483; 2. (United Kingdom) Ben Barker; Team BRM; +0.3613s; 3. (New Zealand) Andrew Waite; Team BRM; +2.9629s

Fastest lap
- (Australia) Tom Tweedie; Team Tom; 0:51.2413

The Tasmanian Super Prix is a motor race for open-wheel racing cars eligible to international Formula 3 regulations held at Symmons Plains Raceway, near Launceston in Tasmania. First established in 2006, the race exists in a role to re-establish a signature race for domestic level open wheel racing cars in Australia, a role that has been largely left vacant since 1985 when the Australian Grand Prix became a round of the Formula One World Championship.

The race was first held in 2006 as the second of two rounds of the Australian Formula 3 championship held over the Symmons Plains round of the Shannons Nationals Motor Racing Championships. Originally held over 25 laps (60 km) of the 2.41 kilometre race track it was expanded to 30 laps (72 km) in 2007. The winner is awarded the John Bowe Trophy, named for the Tasmanian racing driver who twice won the Australian Drivers' Championship in 1984 and 1985, before going on to win the Bathurst 1000 in 1989 and 1994, as well as the Australian Touring Car Championship in 1995.

The inaugural Super Prix winner was Michael Trimble leading home Chris Alajajian by three seconds with British racer Ben Clucas finishing third. In 2007 Barton Mawer scored an upset win ahead of Leanne Tander and eventual series champion Tim Macrow. 2008 saw Tander go one better and take the win, but it would not be enough for Tander to defeat British driver James Winslow to the title victory as the final round of the season. Nathan Caratti finished second ahead of Tim Macrow.

The 2009 race was cancelled along with the entire Symmons Plains round of Shannons Nationals Motor Racing Championships after several support categories withdrew from the meeting removing the meetings financial viability. Formula 3 organisers had vowed that the race would return for the 2010 season and it was allocated to the Hidden Valley round of the 2010 championship and has been held there since. Moved to an early season date, Tom Tweedie won the 2010 race, leading home Team BRM pair of Ben Barker and Andrew Waite.

== Winners ==
Year	Date	Winning driver	Winning car	Winning team
2006	9 April	(Australia) Michael Trimble	Dallara F304	Astuti Motorsport
2007	2 September	(Australia) Barton Mawer	Dallara F304 Spiess-Opel	Team BRM
2008	21 September	(Australia) Leanne Tander	Dallara F307 HWA-Mercedes-Benz	TanderSport
2009	18 October	race cancelled		
2010	11 April	(Australia) Tom Tweedie	Dallara F304 Sodemo-Renault	Team Tom
