= 2004 Australian Formula 3 Championship =

Motor racing competition

Seasons
- ← 2003 2005 →

The 2004 Australian Formula 3 Championship was a CAMS sanctioned national motor racing championship open to Australian Formula 3 cars. The championship, which was the fourth Australian Formula 3 Championship, was organised and administered by Formula 3 Australia Inc.

Western Australian racer Karl Reindler took a narrow three point championship victory driving a Dallara F301 for South Australian-based motor racing team, Team BRM. Reindler took the win over Queensland driver Chris Gilmour.

== Calendar ==
The championship was contested over an eight-round series.

Rd	Circuit	State	Date	Format
1	Adelaide Parklands Circuit	SA	18–21 March	Two races
2	Oran Park Grand Prix Circuit	NSW	16–18 April	Two races
3	Sandown International Motor Raceway	Vic	14–16 May	Two races
4	Winton Motor Raceway	Vic	18–20 June	Two races
5	Eastern Creek International Raceway	NSW	16–18 July	Two races
6	Wakefield Park	NSW	6–8 August	Two races
7	Mallala Motor Sport Park	SA	17–19 September	Two races
8	Surfers Paradise Street Circuit	Qld	21–24 October	Three races

== Classes ==
Cars competed in two classes:.

- The Australian Formula 3 Championship class, which was open to cars constructed in accordance with the FIA Formula 3 regulations that applied in the year of manufacture between 1 January 1995 and 31 December 2001.
- The Yokohama Formula 3 Australia Trophy class, which was open to cars constructed in accordance with the FIA Formula 3 regulations that applied in the year of manufacture between 1 January 1995 and 31 December 1998.

== Points system ==
Championship class points were awarded on a 20-15-12-10-8-6-4-3-2-1 basis to top ten placed Championship class drivers in each race. One additional point was awarded to the driver gaining pole position for the Championship class at each race and one additional point was awarded to the driver setting the fastest Championship class race lap in each race.

Trophy class points were awarded on a 20-15-12-10-8-6-4-3-2-1 basis to top ten placed Trophy class drivers in each race. One additional point was awarded to the driver gaining pole position for the Trophy class at each race and one additional point was awarded to the driver setting the fastest race Trophy class race lap in each race.

Manufacturers Championship points were awarded on a 20-15-12-10-8-6-4-3-2-1 basis to the recognized engine manufacturers of cars classified as finishers in each race, irrespective of class.

- 1st Place points were awarded to the manufacturer of the engine of the race winning car.
- 2nd Place points were awarded to the manufacturer of the engine of the best placed car with a brand of engine other than that of the race winning car.
- 3rd Place points were awarded to the manufacturer of the engine of the best placed car with a brand of engine other than that awarded 1st Place or 2nd Place points for the race, and so forth.

== Results ==
=== Australian Formula 3 Championship ===
Pos.	Driver	No.	Car	Entrant	Adelaide		Oran Pk		Sandown		Winton		Eastern Ck		Wakefield Pk		Mallala		Surfers Paradise			Points
Pos.	Driver	No.	Car	Entrant	R1	R2	R1	R2	R1	R2	R1	R2	R1	R2	R1	R2	R1	R2	R1	R2	R3	Points
1	Karl Reindler	19	Dallara F301 Spiess Opel	Bronte Rundle	12	21	8	12	12	12	10	16	22	22	20	21	14	8	10	12	6	238
2	Chris Gilmour	17	Dallara F301 Spiess Opel	Chris Gilmour	15	13	12	20	21	21	20	12	10	15	10	15	15	20	-	8	8	235
3	Ian Dyk	23	Dallara F301 Spiess Opel	David Borg	22	15	22	1	10	9	15	21	15	8	17	1	6	12	NE	NE	NE	174
4	John Pettit	2	Dallara F396 Spiess Opel	Bob Johns	6	10	10	10	8	15	10	8	12	12	8	10	8	10	12	11	11	171
5	Aaron Caratti	22	Dallara F301 Renault Sodemo	Aaron Caratti	-	-	-	-	-	10	-	-	8	10	12	12	10	15	15	-	15	107
6	Marcus Marshall	4	Dallara F301 Spiess Opel	Bronte Rundle	10	-	NE	NE	NE	NE	NE	NE	NE	NE	NE	NE	NE	NE	22	20	20	72
7	Daniel Pappas	6	Dallara F301 Renault Sodemo	Glenn Russell Coombs	8	8	6	-	16	4	12	10	6	-	NE	NE	NE	NE	NE	NE	NE	70
8	Chris Alajajian	28	Dallara F301 Alfa Romeo	Rudolf Masi	NE	NE	NE	NE	NE	NE	NE	NE	4	6	NE	NE	NE	NE	8	15	12	45
9	Peter Hackett	28	Dallara F301 Alfa Romeo	Rudolf Masi	-	-	15	16	6	6	NE	NE	NE	NE	NE	NE	NE	NE	NE	NE	NE	43
10	Tim Slade	4	Dallara F301 Spiess Opel	Bronte Rundle	NE	NE	NE	NE	NE	NE	NE	NE	NE	NE	NE	NE	20	8	NE	NE	NE	28
11	Kenny Habul	75	Dallara F301 Alfa Romeo	Rudolf Masi	NE	NE	NE	NE	NE	NE	NE	NE	NE	NE	NE	NE	NE	NE	6	6	-	12
12	Danielle Argiro	27	Dallara F301 Alfa Romeo	Rudolf Masi	NE	NE	NE	NE	NE	NE	NE	NE	NE	NE	NE	NE	NE	NE	4	4	4	12
13	Maher Algadri	70	Dallara F301 Mugen Honda	PHR Scuderia	3	6	NE	NE	NE	NE	NE	NE	NE	NE	NE	NE	NE	NE	NE	NE	NE	9
14	David Borg	28	Dallara F301 Alfa Romeo	Rudolf Masi	4	-	NE	NE	NE	NE	NE	NE	NE	NE	NE	NE	NE	NE	NE	NE	NE	4

=== Yokohama Formula 3 Australia Trophy ===
Pos.	Driver	No.	Car	Entrant	Adelaide		Oran Pk		Sandown		Winton		Eastern Ck		Wakefield Pk		Mallala		Surfers Paradise			Points
Pos.	Driver	No.	Car	Entrant	R1	R2	R1	R2	R1	R2	R1	R2	R1	R2	R1	R2	R1	R2	R1	R2	R3	Points
1	Nic Jordan	3	Dallara F398 Spiess Opel	AMS Group	NE	NE	22	22	21	22	22	22	21	22	22	22	22	22	15	-	21	298
2	Bevan Carrick	60	Dallara F398 TOM'S Toyota	Cooltemp Pty Ltd	15	-	15	15	10	10	15	12	12	8	15	15	15	15	22	13	-	207
3	Bill Maddocks	88	Dallara F396 TOM'S Toyota	Bill Maddocks	12	12	12	12	6	-	10	15	10	15	10	12	12	12	8	10	10	178
4	Michael Navybox	5	Dallara F396 Fiat Novamotor	Michael Navybox	10	15	NE	NE	12	12	12	10	NE	NE	12	10	NE	NE	12	20	15	140
5	Heath Eustace	87	Dallara F396 TOM'S Toyota	Scud Racing	-	-	-	10	4	6	8	8	6	10	8	-	NE	NE	NE	NE	-	60
6	Craig Rundle	3	Dallara F398 Spiess Opel	Bronte Rundle	22	22	NE	NE	NE	NE	NE	NE	NE	NE	NE	NE	NE	NE	NE	NE	NE	44
7	Brian Cook	24	Dallara F396 Renault Sodemo	Sam Astuti	NE	NE	NE	NE	15	-	-	-	16	12	NE	NE	NE	NE	NE	NE	NE	43
8	Graeme Holmes	21	Dallara F398 Fiat Novamotor	Graeme Holmes	NE	NE	NE	NE	NE	NE	NE	NE	NE	NE	NE	NE	NE	NE	10	15	12	37
9	Glen Hastings	9	Dallara F396 Mugen Honda	Glen Coombs	NE	NE	NE	NE	1	15	NE	NE	NE	NE	NE	NE	NE	NE	NE	NE	NE	16
10	Rod Anderson	37	Dallara F396 TOM'S Toyota	Rod Anderson	-	-	-	-	8	8	-	-	-	-	NE	NE	NE	NE	NE	NE	NE	16
11	David Choon	11	Dallara F396 Fiat Novamotor	David Choon	NE	NE	NE	NE	NE	NE	NE	NE	8	6	NE	NE	NE	NE	NE	NE	NE	14
12	Kevin Miller	9	Dallara F396 Mugen Honda	Glen Coombs	NE	NE	NE	NE	NE	NE	NE	NE	NE	NE	NE	NE	NE	NE	6	-	8	14

=== Australian Formula 3 Engine Manufacturers Championship ===
Pos.	Manufacturer	Adelaide		Oran Pk		Sandown		Winton		Eastern Ck		Wakefield Pk		Mallala		Surfers Paradise			Points
Pos.	Manufacturer	R1	R2	R1	R2	R1	R2	R1	R2	R1	R2	R1	R2	R1	R2	R1	R2	R3	Points
1	Spiess Opel	20	20	20	20	20	20	20	20	20	20	20	20	20	20	20	20	20	340
2	Renault Sodemo	15	15	12	-	15	15	15	15	15	15	15	15	15	15	15	-	15	222
3	TOM'S Toyota	10	10	10	12	8	6	12	12	10	10	12	12	12	12	10	10	8	176
4	Alfa Romeo Novamotor	12	-	15	15	12	12			12	12	10	10			12	15	10	147
5	Fiat Novamotor	6	12			10	8	10	10	8	8					8	12	12	104
6	Mugen Honda	8	8			-	10									6	-	6	38
