= Tim Slade =

Australian racing driver (born 1985)

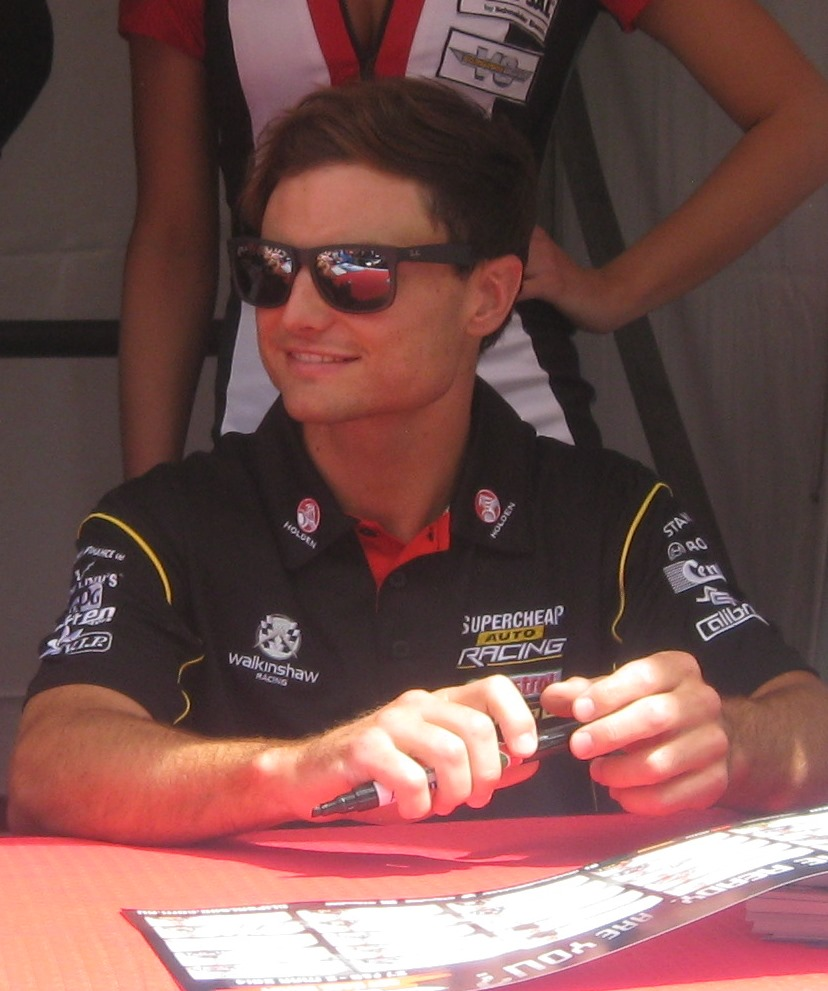
- Tim Slade signing autographs in 2014
- Nationality: Australian
- Born: Timothy Keighran Slade; 3 August 1985 (age 41) Hornsby, New South Wales
- Categorisation: FIA Gold

Supercars Championship career
- Current team: Grove Racing (Endurance race co-driver)
- Championships: 0
- Races: 453
- Wins: 2
- Podiums: 17
- Pole positions: 2
- 2024 position: 20th (1380 pts)

Timothy Keighran Slade (born 3 August 1985) is an Australian semi-retired racing driver who is best known for competing in the Repco Supercars Championship.

== Early career ==
Slade first appeared at a national level racing in the 2003 Australian Formula Ford Championship. During the 2004 Australian Formula 3 Championship, Slade, in his rookie season with Team BRM, won his first race when making a one-off appearance at the penultimate round of the series. Slade returned to Formula 3 for the following season, beginning a long-running partnership with businessman James Rosenberg, who owned the car. However, after having scored just 25 points after the first four races, compared to the 57 points of joint series leaders Chris Alajajian and Michael Trimble, Slade was dropped from the team.

Taking a step backwards, Slade competed in his first full season at national level in 2006, racing for Sonic Motor Racing Services in the 2006 Australian Formula Ford Championship. Slade narrowly lost a season-long battle with John Martin for the title.

== Supercars Championship ==
=== Development Series ===
Turning his back on open wheelers, Slade moved into the Fujitsu V8 Supercar Series for the 2007 season, starting the season with ANT Racing in a Ford Falcon (BA). However, Slade's season was blighted by a team shift to MW Motorsport mid-season and he finished ninth in the points. The highlight of his season was a second-place finish in the reverse grid race at Queensland Raceway.

In 2008, Slade renewed his partnership with Rosenberg, who purchased Slade a Holden Commodore (VZ) from Perkins Engineering, which ran under the banner of 'Slade Sport'. Early in the season Slade won the Wakefield Park round, but poor results at Queensland Raceway and at Mount Panorama, plus the limited resources available, restricted Slade to seventh in the series results.

=== Paul Morris Motorsport ===
Early in 2009, Slade was announced as the replacement driver for the retiring Paul Morris at his eponymous team to graduate into V8 Supercars. The drive was once again backed by Rosenberg. Driving a Holden Commodore (VE) sponsored by Supercheap Auto, Slade finished 23rd in the championship.

=== James Rosenberg Racing ===
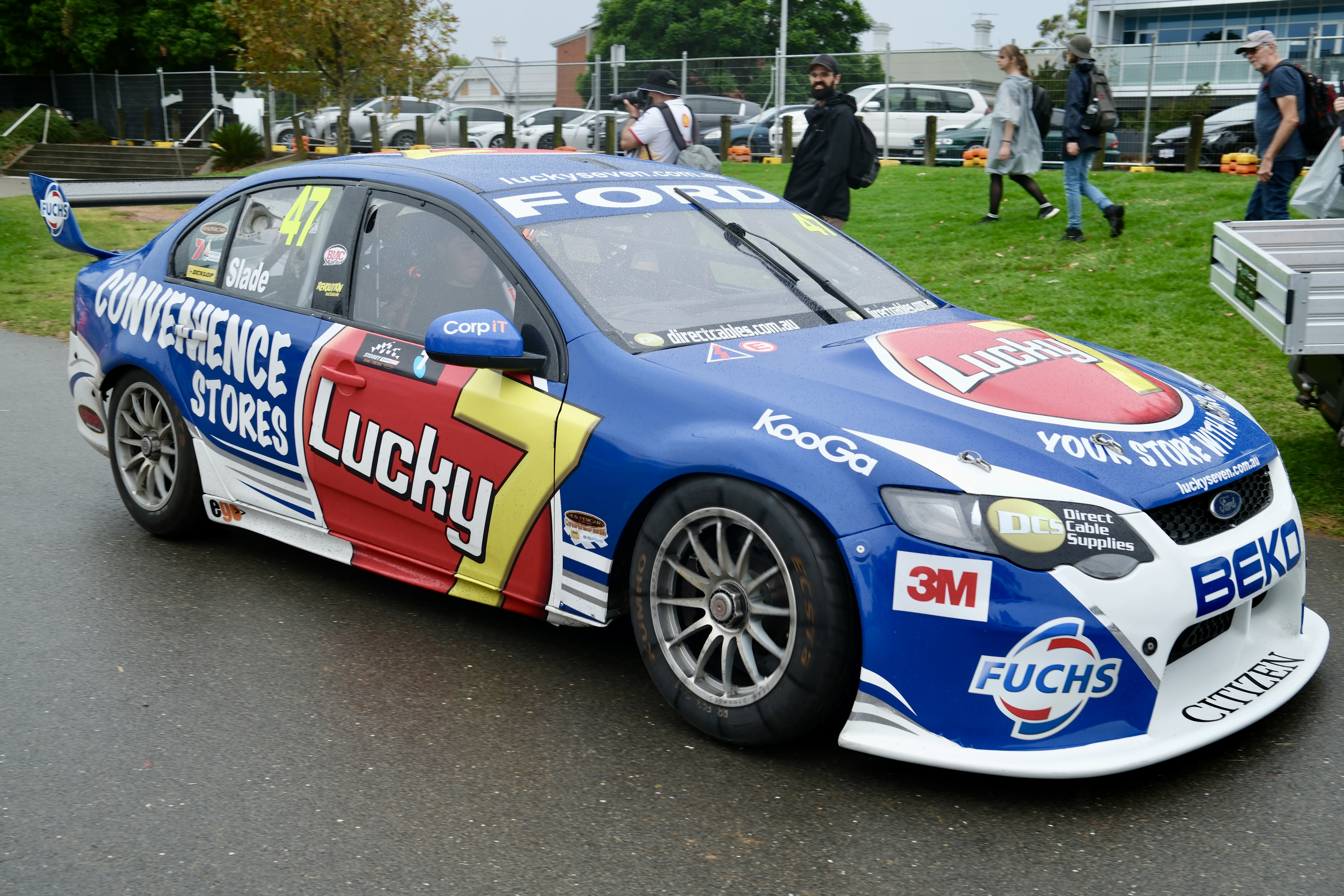
The Ford Falcon (FG) of Tim Slade at the 2026 Adelaide Motorsport Festival

In 2010, Slade moved teams to the newly formed James Rosenberg Racing, driving the #47 Wilson Security-backed Ford Falcon (FG) as a satellite entry of Stone Brothers Racing. His best results of the year were a pair of fifth places at Hidden Valley Raceway and at the Phillip Island 500, with co-driver Jack Perkins. For 2011, Slade remained with the team, with a new title sponsor, Lucky 7, and improved to ninth in the championship standings including three podium positions at Queensland Raceway.

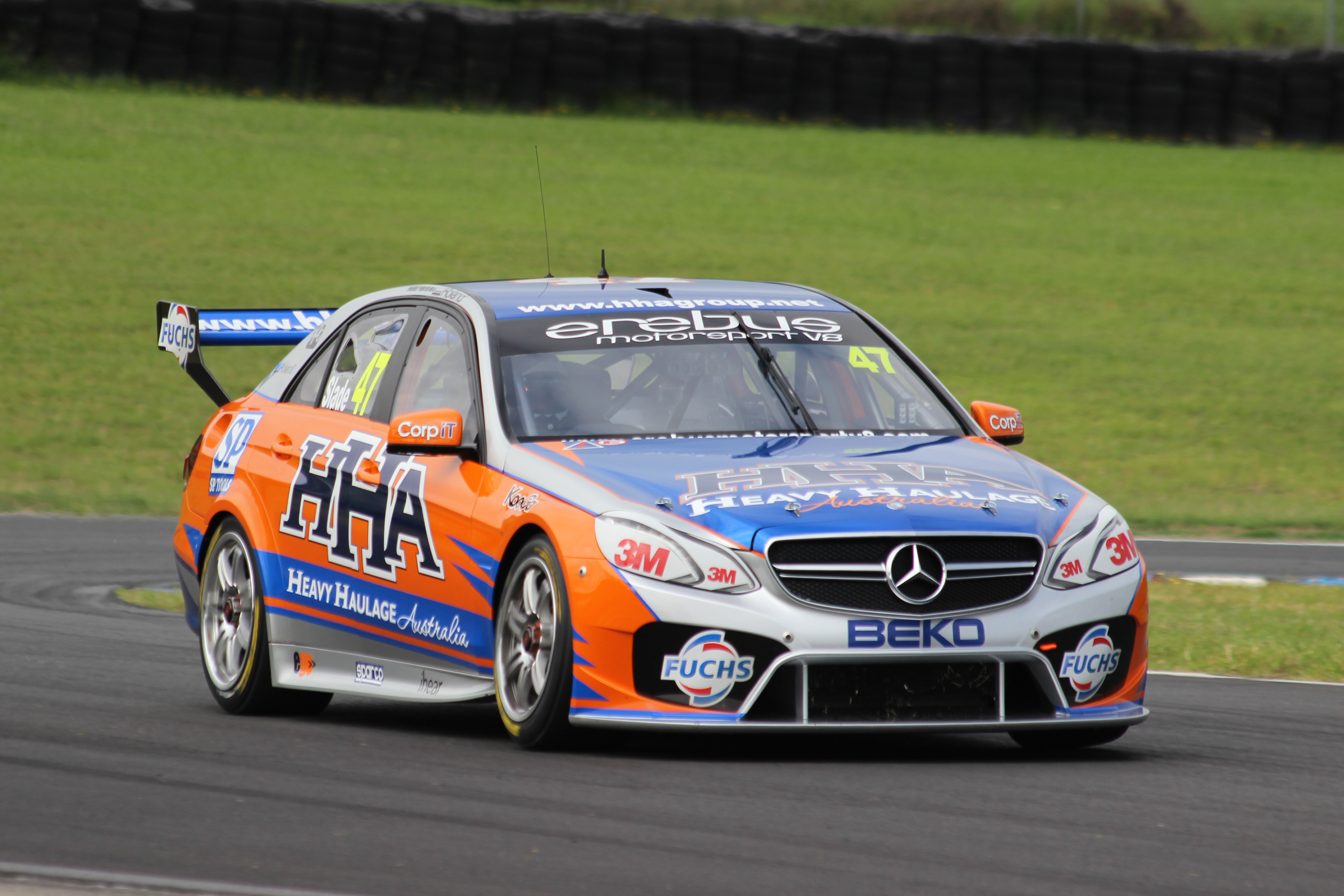
Slade during test day for the 2013 Supercars season

Slade had his breakout year in 2012 aboard the Lucky 7 Falcon, where he finished fifth in the championship. Stone Brothers Racing was then sold at the end of 2012 to Erebus Motorsport, who brought in the Mercedes-Benz E63 AMG to V8 Supercars under the new Car of the Future regulations in 2013. However, the Erebus package struggled and Slade could only manage 22nd in the championship.

=== Walkinshaw Racing ===
Slade moved to Walkinshaw Racing for the 2014, driving his team's No. 47 VF Commodore. This also marked a return to Supercheap Auto colours for Slade and a move away from his association with James Rosenberg, who coincidentally ended up running a sister car to Slade at Walkinshaw Racing for Nick Percat. He finished the year in 17th position. He remained with the team for the 2015 season, finishing 13th in the championship.

=== Brad Jones Racing ===
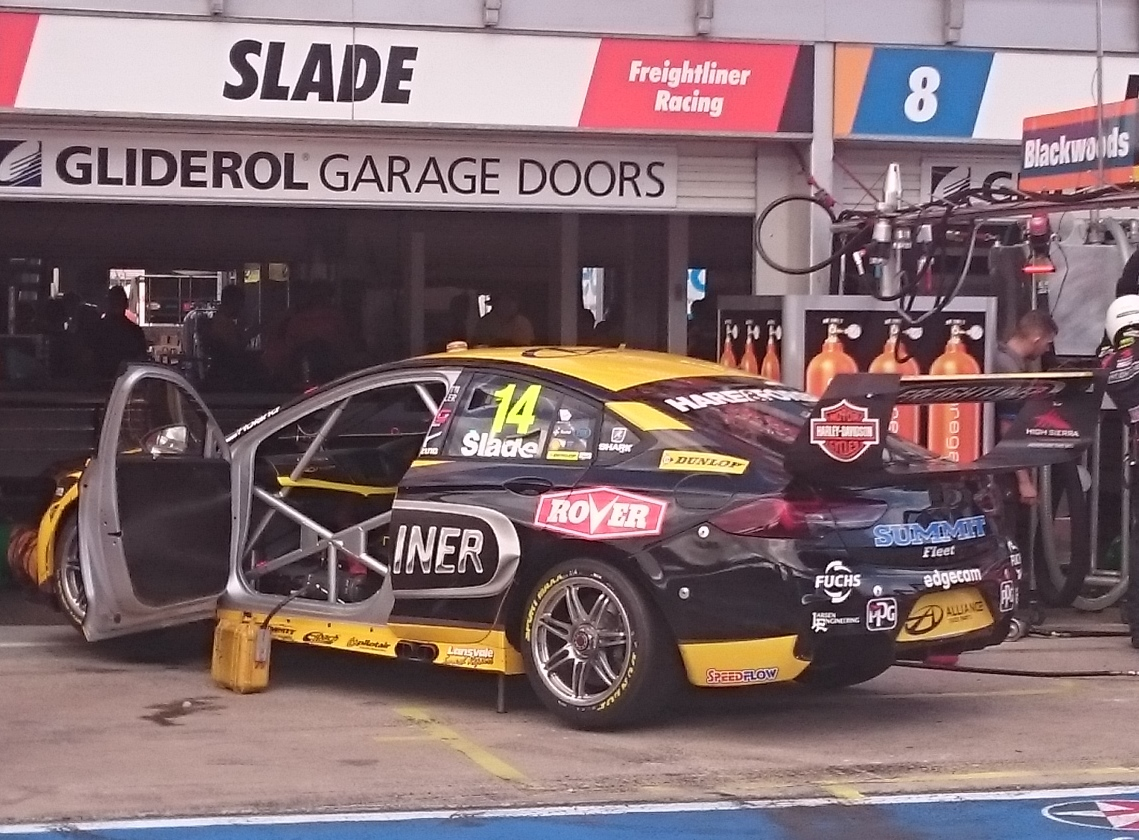
Slade's Holden Commodore (ZB) at the 2018 Adelaide 500

In 2016, Walkinshaw Racing downsized to two cars and Slade moved to Brad Jones Racing. After a slow start to the season, Slade won the first two races of his career at the 2016 Woodstock Winton SuperSprint.

=== DJR Team Penske ===
After he announced he would retire from full-time competition, Slade was signed by DJR Team Penske to co-drive alongside Scott McLaughlin for the Bathurst 1000. The pair finished fifth behind other DJR Car of Fabian Coulthard and Tony D'Alberto.

=== Blanchard Racing Team ===
In 2021, Tim Blanchard signed Slade to drive the No. 3 CoolDrive Auto Parts backed ex-23Red Racing Ford Mustang GT for his team Blanchard Racing Team. (formally known as Tim Blanchard Racing).

=== PremiAir Racing ===
After two years with the Blanchard Racing Team, Slade announced his shift to PremiAir Racing for the 2023 season.

== GT ==
In 2012, Slade joined Erebus Motorsport for its Bathurst 12 Hour campaign, driving the team's Mercedes-Benz SLS AMG GT3. Along with Jeroen Bleekemolen, Peter Hackett and Bret Curtis, he finished the race in second position. He once again entered the race with Erebus in 2013, finishing in sixth position with Lee Holdsworth and Peter Hackett. In 2016, he competed in the event once again, this time in a McLaren 650S GT3 with Tony Walls, Matt Campbell and Warren Luff. Slade has also appeared as a guest driver at the annual Pro-Am event of the Australian Carrera Cup Championship on multiple occasions.

== Career results ==
=== Karting career summary ===
Season	Series	Position
2000	Australian National Sprint Kart Championships - Junior Piston Port	**2nd**
2001	CIK Stars of Karting Championship - KF3	**1st**

=== Circuit Career ===
Season	Series	Position	Car	Team
2003	Australian Formula Ford Championship	22nd	Van Diemen RF92 Ford	Steel Building Systems
2004	Australian Formula 3 Championship	10th	Dallara F301 Spiess Opel	Team BRM
2004	Australian Formula Ford Championship	29th	Van Diemen RF01 Ford	Ben Fitzgerald
2005	Australian Drivers' Championship	11th	Dallara F304 Spiess Opel	Team BRM
2006	Australian Formula Ford Championship	2nd	Van Diemen RF04 Ford	Sonic Motor Racing Services
2006-07	Toyota Racing Series	28th	Tatuus TT104ZZ - Toyota	European Technique
2007	Fujitsu V8 Supercar Series	9th	Ford Falcon (BA)	A.N.T. Racing; MW Motorsport
2008	Fujitsu V8 Supercar Series	7th	Holden Commodore (VZ)	Slade Speed
2009	V8 Supercar Championship Series	23rd	Holden Commodore (VE)	Paul Morris Motorsport
2010	V8 Supercar Championship Series	16th	Ford Falcon (FG)	James Rosenberg Racing
2011	International V8 Supercars Championship	9th	Ford Falcon (FG)	James Rosenberg Racing
2012	International V8 Supercars Championship	5th	Ford Falcon (FG)	James Rosenberg Racing
2012	Australian Side x Side Rally Challenge	11th	Polaris RZR 900 XP	Polaris Off Road Vehicles
2013	Australian GT Championship	23rd	Mercedes-Benz SLS AMG GT3	Erebus Motorsport
2013	V8SuperTourers Championship	11th	Holden Commodore (VE)	M3 Racing
2013	International V8 Supercars Championship	22nd	Mercedes-Benz E63 AMG	James Rosenberg Racing
2014	International V8 Supercars Championship	17th	Holden Commodore (VF)	Walkinshaw Racing
2015	International V8 Supercars Championship	13th	Holden Commodore (VF)	Walkinshaw Racing
2016	World Time Attack Challenge	1st	Nissan Silvia S13	MCA Suspension
2016	International V8 Supercars Championship	8th	Holden Commodore (VF)	Brad Jones Racing
2017	Virgin Australia Supercars Championship	11th	Holden Commodore (VF)	Brad Jones Racing
2017	World Time Attack Challenge	1st	Nissan Silvia S13	MCA Suspension
2018	Virgin Australia Supercars Championship	11th	Holden Commodore (ZB)	Brad Jones Racing
2018	Blancpain GT Series Asia - ProAm Cup	10th	Ferrari 488 GT3	HubAuto Corsa
2019	Virgin Australia Supercars Championship	15th	Holden Commodore (ZB)	Brad Jones Racing
2019	Intercontinental GT Challenge	18th	Ferrari 488 GT3	HubAuto Corsa
2019-20	Asian Le Mans Series	12th	Ferrari 488 GT3	HubAuto Corsa
2020	Virgin Australia Supercars Championship	30th	Ford Mustang GT	DJR Team Penske
2021	Repco Supercars Championship	12th	Ford Mustang GT	Blanchard Racing Team
2022	Repco Supercars Championship	11th	Ford Mustang GT	Blanchard Racing Team
2022	S5000 Australian Drivers' Championship	16th	Rogers AF01- Ford V8	Team BRM
2023	Repco Supercars Championship	19th	Chevrolet Camaro ZL1	PremiAir Racing
2024	Repco Supercars Championship	20th	Chevrolet Camaro ZL1	PremiAir Racing
2025	Repco Supercars Championship	29th	Chevrolet Camaro ZL1	Matt Stone Racing

=== Complete Toyota Racing Series results ===
(key) (Races in bold indicate pole position) (Races in italics indicate fastest lap)

Year	Entrant	1	2	3	4	5	6	7	8	9	10	11	12	13	14	15	16	17	18	19	DC	Points
2006–07	European Technique	PUK; 1	PUK; 2	PUK; 3	RUA; 1	RUA; 2	TAU; 1	TAU; 2	TAU; 3	MAN; 1	MAN; 2	MAN; 3	TIM; 1	TIM; 2	TIM; 3	TER; 1	TER; 2	TER; 3	PUK; 1; 8	PUK; 2; 11	28th	39

=== Super2 Series results ===
(key) (Races in bold indicate pole position) (Races in italics indicate fastest lap)

Super2 Series results
Year	Team	No.	Car	1	2	3	4	5	6	7	8	9	10	11	12	13	14	15	16	17	18	Position	Points
2007	A.N.T. Racing	30	Ford BA Falcon	ADE; R1; 10	ADE; R2; 7	WAK; R3; 12	WAK; R4; 13	WAK; R5; Ret														9th	139
2007	MW Motorsport	29	Ford BA Falcon						WIN; R6; 8	WIN; R7; 23	WIN; R8; 11	QLD; R9; 9	QLD; R10; 2	QLD; R11; 7	ORA; R12; Ret	ORA; R13; 20	ORA; R14; 7	BAT; R15; 9	BAT; R16; 4	PHI; R17	PHI; R18	9th	139
2008	Slade Speed	23	Holden VZ Commodore	ADE; R1; 3	ADE; R2; Ret	WAK; R3; 7	WAK; R4; 1	**WAK**; **R5**; 2	SAN; R6; 11	SAN; R7; 20	SAN; R8; 14	QLD; R9; 24	QLD; R10; 24	QLD; R11; 20	WIN; R12; 7	WIN; R13; 6	WIN; R14; 6	BAT; R15; 27	BAT; R16; Ret	ORA; R17; 4	ORA; R18; 2	7th	1061

=== Supercars Championship results ===
(key) (Races in bold indicate pole position) (Races in italics indicate fastest lap)

Supercars results
Year	Team	No.	Car	1	2	3	4	5	6	7	8	9	10	11	12	13	14	15	16	17	18	19	20	21	22	23	24	25	26	27	28	29	30	31	32	33	34	35	36	37	38	39	Position	Points
2009	Paul Morris Motorsport	67	Holden VE Commodore	ADE; R1; Ret	ADE; R2; Ret	HAM; R3; Ret	HAM; R4; DNS	WIN; R5; 18	WIN; R6; 17	SYM; R7; 24	SYM; R8; 14	HDV; R9; 27	HDV; R10; 25	TOW; R11; Ret	TOW; R12; 13	SAN; R13; 21	SAN; R14; 24	QLD; R15; 10	QLD; R16; 22	PHI; QR; 23	PHI; R17; 7	BAT; R18; 7	SUR; R19; 17	SUR; R20; 21	SUR; R21; 17	SUR; R22; 21	PHI; R23; 21	PHI; R24; 16	BAR; R25; 19	BAR; R26; 22	SYD; R27; Ret	SYD; R28; 16											23rd	1221
2010	James Rosenberg Racing	47	Ford FG Falcon	YMC; R1; 14	YMC; R2; 13	BHR; R3; 21	BHR; R4; 18	ADE; R5; Ret	ADE; R6; 17	HAM; R7; Ret	HAM; R8; 16	QLD; R9; 16	QLD; R10; 17	WIN; R11; 12	WIN; R12; 7	HDV; R13; 6	HDV; R14; 6	TOW; R15; 12	TOW; R16; 12	PHI; R17; 5	BAT; R18; 18	SUR; R19; 18	SUR; R20; 19	SYM; R21; 19	SYM; R22; 18	SAN; R23; 18	SAN; R24; 6	SYD; R25; Ret	SYD; R26; Ret														16th	1595
2011	James Rosenberg Racing	47	Ford FG Falcon	YMC; R1; 5	YMC; R2; Ret	ADE; R3; 8	ADE; R4; 13	HAM; R5; Ret	HAM; R6; Ret	BAR; R7; 22	BAR; R8; 5	BAR; R9; 9	WIN; R10; 15	WIN; R11; 13	HID; R12; 21	HID; R13; 4	TOW; R14; 25	TOW; R15; 7	QLD; R16; 2	QLD; R17; 3	QLD; R18; 2	PHI; QR; 21	PHI; R19; 24	BAT; R20; 12	SUR; R21; 12	SUR; R22; 10	SYM; R23; 12	SYM; R24; 27	SAN; R25; 15	SAN; R26; 7	SYD; R27; 6	SYD; R28; 10											9th	1904
2012	James Rosenberg Racing	47	Ford FG Falcon	ADE; R1; 12	ADE; R2; 10	SYM; R3; 8	SYM; R4; 4	HAM; R5; 15	HAM; R6; 11	BAR; R7; 6	BAR; R8; 7	BAR; R9; 8	PHI; R10; 3	PHI; R11; 12	HID; R12; 6	HID; R13; 10	TOW; R14; 21	TOW; R15; 12	QLD; R16; 9	QLD; R17; 8	SMP; R18; 16	SMP; R19; 14	SAN; QR; 4	SAN; R20; 7	BAT; R21; 7	SUR; R22; 5	SUR; R23; 4	YMC; R24; 4	YMC; R25; 6	YMC; R26; 3	WIN; R27; 6	WIN; R28; 5	**SYD**; **R29**; **2**	SYD; R30; 4									5th	2790
2013	James Rosenberg Racing	47	Mercedes-Benz E63 AMG	ADE; R1; 15	ADE; R2; Ret	SYM; R3; 22	SYM; R4; 22	SYM; R5; 18	PUK; R6; 25	PUK; R7; 26	PUK; R8; 16	PUK; R9; 23	BAR; R10; 13	BAR; R11; 23	BAR; R12; 24	COA; R13; 22	COA; R14; 26	COA; R15; 20	COA; R16; 17	HID; R17; 6	HID; R18; 11	HID; R19; Ret	TOW; R20; Ret	TOW; R21; 8	QLD; R22; 24	QLD; R23; 13	QLD; R24; 8	WIN; R25; 22	WIN; R26; 19	WIN; R27; 15	SAN; QR; 8	SAN; R28; 21	BAT; R29; 26	SUR; R30; 15	SUR; R31; 20	PHI; R32; 25	PHI; R33; 24	PHI; R34; 20	SYD; R35; 8	SYD; R36; 11			22nd	1298
2014	Walkinshaw Racing	47	Holden VF Commodore	ADE; R1; 15	ADE; R2; 14	ADE; R3; 6	SYM; R4; 14	SYM; R5; 19	SYM; R6; 8	WIN; R7; Ret	WIN; R8; 11	WIN; R9; 3	PUK; R10; 11	PUK; R11; Ret	PUK; R12; 24	PUK; R13; 21	BAR; R14; 23	BAR; R15; 14	BAR; R16; 25	HID; R17; 16	HID; R18; 8	HID; R19; 19	TOW; R20; Ret	TOW; R21; Ret	TOW; R22; 13	QLD; R23; 15	QLD; R24; 17	QLD; R25; 14	SMP; R26; Ret	SMP; R27; DNS	SMP; R28; DNS	SAN; QR; 9	SAN; R29; 12	BAT; R30; Ret	SUR; R31; 3	SUR; R32; 4	PHI; R33; 12	PHI; R34; 24	PHI; R35; 17	SYD; R36; 2	SYD; R37; 7	SYD; R38; 6	17th	1646
2015	Walkinshaw Racing	47	Holden VF Commodore	ADE; R1; 8	ADE; R2; Ret	ADE; R3; 8	SYM; R4; 9	SYM; R5; 14	SYM; R6; Ret	BAR; R7; 16	BAR; R8; 10	BAR; R9; 23	WIN; R10; 19	WIN; R11; 11	WIN; R12; 14	HID; R13; 7	HID; R14; 2	HID; R15; 9	TOW; R16; 20	TOW; R17; 14	QLD; R18; 11	QLD; R19; 14	QLD; R20; 19	SMP; R21; 15	SMP; R22; 14	SMP; R23; 8	SAN; QR; 6	SAN; R24; 6	BAT; R25; 14	SUR; R26; 14	SUR; R27; 12	PUK; R28; 15	PUK; R29; 7	PUK; R30; 23	PHI; R31; 10	PHI; R32; 16	PHI; R33; 17	SYD; R34; 6	SYD; R35; 20	SYD; R36; Ret			12th	1764
2016	Brad Jones Racing	14	Holden VF Commodore	ADE; R1; Ret	ADE; R2; 17	ADE; R3; 20	SYM; R4; 8	SYM; R5; 13	PHI; R6; 8	PHI; R7; 13	BAR; R8; 10	BAR; R9; 16	**WIN**; **R10**; 1	WIN; R11; 1	HID; R12; 13	HID; R13; 2	TOW; R14; 13	TOW; R15; 13	QLD; R16; 6	QLD; R17; 7	SMP; R18; 7	SMP; R19; 12	SAN; QR; 8	SAN; R20; 16	BAT; R21; 7	SUR; R22; 11	SUR; R23; 8	PUK; R24; 17	PUK; R25; 23	PUK; R26; 19	PUK; R27; 16	SYD; R28; 9	SYD; R29; 7										8th	2263
2017	Brad Jones Racing	14	Holden VF Commodore	ADE; R1; 14	ADE; R2; 7	SYM; R3; Ret	SYM; R4; 8	PHI; R5; 18	PHI; R6; 19	BAR; R7; 13	BAR; R8; 17	WIN; R9; 27	WIN; R10; 11	HID; R11; 11	HID; R12; 5	TOW; R13; 20	TOW; R14; Ret	QLD; R15; 4	QLD; R16; 7	SMP; R17; 18	SMP; R18; 17	SAN; QR; 17	SAN; R19; DSQ	BAT; R20; 9	SUR; R21; 3	SUR; R22; 22	PUK; R23; 6	PUK; R24; 15	NEW; R25; 3	NEW; R26; 11													11th	1812
2018	Brad Jones Racing	14	Holden ZB Commodore	ADE; R1; 13	ADE; R2; 11	MEL; R3; 10	MEL; R4; 10	MEL; R5; 4	MEL; R6; 11	SYM; R7; 7	SYM; R8; 14	PHI; R9; 10	PHI; R10; 12	BAR; R11; 4	BAR; R12; 17	WIN; R13; 7	WIN; R14; 7	HID; R15; 14	HID; R16; 21	TOW; R17; 11	TOW; R18; 14	QLD; R19; 14	QLD; R20; 6	SMP; R21; 10	BEN; R22; 12	BEN; R23; 4	SAN; QR; 8	SAN; R24; 15	BAT; R25; 17	SUR; R26; 21	SUR; R27; C	PUK; R28; 17	PUK; R29; 11	NEW; R30; 18	NEW; R31; 15								11th	2249
2019	Brad Jones Racing	14	Holden ZB Commodore	ADE; R1; 17	ADE; R2; 4	MEL; R3; 6	MEL; R4; 8	MEL; R5; 3	MEL; R6; 7	SYM; R7; 7	SYM; R8; 12	PHI; R9; 17	PHI; R10; 9	BAR; R11; 11	BAR; R12; 11	WIN; R13; 13	WIN; R14; 12	HID; R15; Ret	HID; R16; 18	TOW; R17; 16	TOW; R18; 12	QLD; R19; Ret	QLD; R20; 17	BEN; R21; 14	BEN; R22; 12	PUK; R23; 11	PUK; R24; 18	BAT; R25; Ret	SUR; R26; 8	SUR; R27; 17	SAN; QR; 20	SAN; R28; 13	NEW; R29; 9	NEW; R30; 3									15th	1940
2020	DJR Team Penske	17	Ford Mustang S550	ADE; R1	ADE; R2	MEL; R3	MEL; R4	MEL; R5	MEL; R6	SMP1; R7	SMP1; R8	SMP1; R9	SMP2; R10	SMP2; R11	SMP2; R12	HID1; R13	HID1; R14	HID1; R15	HID2; R16	HID2; R17	HID2; R18	TOW1; R19	TOW1; R20	TOW1; R21	TOW2; R22	TOW2; R23	TOW2; R24	BEN1; R25	BEN1; R26	BEN1; R27	BEN2; R28	BEN2; R29	BEN2; R30	BAT; R31; 5									30th	222
2021	Blanchard Racing Team	3	Ford Mustang S550	BAT1; R1; Ret	BAT1; R2; DNS	SAN; R3; 13	SAN; R4; 9	SAN; R5; 17	SYM; R6; 17	SYM; R7; 12	SYM; R8; 12	BEN; R9; 14	BEN; R10; 15	BEN; R11; 7	HID; R12; 7	HID; R13; 19	HID; R14; 9	TOW1; R15; 6	TOW1; R16; 8	TOW2; R17; 4	TOW2; R18; 12	TOW2; R19; 22	SMP1; R20; 10	SMP1; R21; 5	SMP1; R22; 9	SMP2; R23; 7	SMP2; R24; 12	SMP2; R25; 5	SMP3; R26; 9	SMP3; R27; 20	SMP3; R28; 20	SMP4; R29; 13	SMP4; R30; C	BAT2; R31; 9									12th	1627
2022	Blanchard Racing Team	3	Ford Mustang S550	SMP; R1; 8	SMP; R2; 10	SYM; R3; 11	SYM; R4; 14	SYM; R5; 11	MEL; R6; 4	MEL; R7; 8	MEL; R8; 7	MEL; R9; 4	BAR; R10; 13	BAR; R11; 13	BAR; R12; 10	WIN; R13; 16	WIN; R14; 15	WIN; R15; 20	HID; R16; 12	HID; R17; 14	HID; R18; 11	TOW; R19; 8	TOW; R20; 8	BEN; R21; 23	BEN; R22; 16	BEN; R23; 11	SAN; R24; 18	SAN; R25; 11	SAN; R26; 6	PUK; R27; Ret	PUK; R28; 15	PUK; R29; 10	BAT; R30; 19	SUR; R31; 12	SUR; R32; 10	ADE; R33; 5	ADE; R34; 13						11th	1855
2023	PremiAir Racing	23	Chevrolet Camaro ZL1	NEW; R1; 22	NEW; R2; 9	MEL; R3; 20	MEL; R4; 13	MEL; R5; 8	MEL; R6; 15	BAR; R7; 7	BAR; R8; 24	BAR; R9; 8	SYM; R10; 6	SYM; R11; 7	SYM; R12; 25	HID; R13; 10	HID; R14; 11	HID; R15; 18	TOW; R16; 18	TOW; R17; 23	SMP; R18; 6	SMP; R19; 12	BEN; R20; 16	BEN; R21; 18	BEN; R22; 22	SAN; R23; 9	BAT; R24; 13	SUR; R25; 21	SUR; R26; Ret	ADE; R27; 16	ADE; R28; 16												19th	1497
2024	PremiAir Racing	23	Chevrolet Camaro ZL1	BAT1; R1; 17	BAT1; R2; 17	MEL; R3; 15	MEL; R4; 10	MEL; R5; 8	MEL; R6; 10	TAU; R7; Ret	TAU; R8; 21	BAR; R9; 12	BAR; R10; 22	HID; R11; 12	HID; R12; 13	TOW; R13; 23	TOW; R14; 17	SMP; R15; 15	SMP; R16; 12	SYM; R17; 8	SYM; R18; 10	SAN; R19; 12	BAT; R20; 19	SUR; R21; 18	SUR; R22; 17	ADE; R23; 20	ADE; R24; 14																20th	1380
2025	Matt Stone Racing	10	Chevrolet Camaro ZL1	SYD; R1	SYD; R2	SYD; R3	MEL; R4	MEL; R5	MEL; R6	MEL; R7	TAU; R8	TAU; R9	TAU; R10	SYM; R11	SYM; R12	SYM; R13	BAR; R14	BAR; R15	BAR; R16	HID; R17	HID; R18	HID; R19	TOW; R20	TOW; R21	TOW; R22	QLD; R23	QLD; R24	QLD; R25	BEN; R26; 5	BAT; R27; Ret	SUR; R28	SUR; R29	SAN; R30	SAN; R31	ADE; R32	ADE; R33	ADE; R34						29th*	215*
2026	Grove Racing	26	Ford Mustang S650	SMP; R1	SMP; R2	SMP; R3	MEL; R4	MEL; R5	MEL; R6	MEL; R7	TAU; R8	TAU; R9	TAU; R10	CHR; R11	CHR; R12	CHR; R13	SYM; R14	SYM; R15	SYM; R16	BAR; R17	BAR; R18	BAR; R19	HID; R20	HID; R21	HID; R22	TOW; R23	TOW; R24	TOW; R25	QLD; R26	QLD; R27	QLD; R28	BEN; R29	BAT; R30	SUR; R31	SUR; R32	SAN; R33	SAN; R34	ADE; R35	ADE; R36	ADE; R37				

=== Complete Bathurst 1000 results ===
Year	Team	Car	Co-driver	Position	Laps
2009	Paul Morris Motorsport	Holden Commodore VE	(Australia) Paul Morris	7th	161
2010	James Rosenberg Racing	Ford Falcon FG	(Australia) Jack Perkins	18th	161
2011	James Rosenberg Racing	Ford Falcon FG	(New Zealand) Daniel Gaunt	12th	161
2012	James Rosenberg Racing	Ford Falcon FG	(Australia) Andrew Thompson	7th	161
2013	James Rosenberg Racing	Mercedes-Benz E63 AMG	(Australia) Andrew Thompson	26th	137
2014	Walkinshaw Racing	Holden Commodore VF	(Australia) Tony D'Alberto	DNF	102
2015	Walkinshaw Racing	Holden Commodore VF	(Australia) Tony D'Alberto	14th	161
2016	Brad Jones Racing	Holden Commodore VF	(Australia) Ashley Walsh	7th	161
2017	Brad Jones Racing	Holden Commodore VF	(Australia) Ashley Walsh‡ (New Zealand) Andre Heimgartner	9th	161
2018	Brad Jones Racing	Holden Commodore ZB	(Australia) Ashley Walsh	17th	160
2019	Brad Jones Racing	Holden Commodore ZB	(Australia) Ashley Walsh	DNF	0
2020	DJR Team Penske	Ford Mustang S550	(New Zealand) Scott McLaughlin	5th	161
2021	Blanchard Racing Team	Ford Mustang S550	(Australia) Tim Blanchard	9th	161
2022	Blanchard Racing Team	Ford Mustang S550	(Australia) Tim Blanchard	19th	161
2023	PremiAir Racing	Chevrolet Camaro Mk.6	(Australia) Jonathon Webb	13th	161
2024	PremiAir Racing	Chevrolet Camaro Mk.6	(Australia) Cameron McLeod	19th	161
2025	Matt Stone Racing	Chevrolet Camaro Mk.6	(Australia) Nick Percat	DNF	50
2026	Grove Racing	Ford Mustang S650	(Australia) Kai Allen	20th	159

‡Walsh was entered as a co-driver to Slade but withdrew due to injury and was replaced with Heimgartner.

=== Bathurst 12 Hour results ===
Year	Team	Co-drivers	Car	Class	Laps	Pos.	Class pos.
2007	(Australia) Mid-West Multimedia	(Australia) Andrew Bretherton (Australia) Trevor Keene	Mini Cooper S	E	239	12th	**2nd**
2012	(Australia) Erebus Racing	(Netherlands) Jeroen Bleekemolen (Australia) Peter Hackett (United States) Bret Curtis	Mercedes-Benz SLS AMG	A	270	**2nd**	**2nd**
2013	(Australia) Erebus Racing	(Australia) Lee Holdsworth (Australia) Peter Hackett	Mercedes-Benz SLS AMG	A	263	6th	6th
2016	(Australia) Objective Racing	(Australia) Matt Campbell (Australia) Warren Luff (Australia) Tony Walls	McLaren 650S GT3	AA	49	DNF	
2017	(Australia) Objective Racing	(Australia) Alex Davison (Australia) Tony Walls	McLaren 650S GT3	APA	268	20th	6th
2018	(Australia) Objective Racing (New Zealand) McElrea Racing	(New Zealand) Jaxon Evans (Australia) Tony Walls	McLaren 650S GT3	APA	260	DNF	
2019	(Taiwan) HubAuto Corsa	(Australia) Nick Foster (Australia) Nick Percat	Ferrari 488 GT3	APP	279	18th	12th
2020	(Taiwan) HubAuto Corsa	(Brazil) Marcos Gomes (Brazil) Daniel Serra	Ferrari 488 GT3	PA	0	WD	
2024	(Papua New Guinea) Wheels LTD	(Papua New Guinea) Keith Kassulke (Australia) Cameron McLeod (Australia) Hadrian Morrall	MARC II V8 - Ford	!	85	DNF	

=== Bathurst 6 Hour results ===
Year	Team	Co-drivers	Car	Class	Laps	Pos.	Class pos.
2017	CGR Performance	(Australia) Dylan Thomas	Mitsubishi Lancer Evolution X RS	A1	30	DNF	DNF
2018	CGR Performance	(Australia) Dylan Thomas	Mitsubishi Lancer Evolution IX RS	A1	30	DNF	DNF
2021	Carr Motorsport	(Australia) Bradley Carr	BMW M3 F80	X	120	4th	4th
2022	Carr Motorsport	(Australia) Bradley Carr	BMW M3 F80	X	130	**2nd**	**2nd**
2026	Tamborine Mountain Nursery	(Australia) Tony Alford (Australia) Kyle Alford	Ford Mustang Mach 1	A2	114	4th	**3rd**

=== California 8 Hour results ===
Year	Team	Co-drivers	Car	Class	Laps	Pos.	Class pos.
2019	(Taiwan) HubAuto Corsa	(Australia) Nick Foster (Spain) Miguel Molina	Ferrari 488 GT3	GT3	327	**1st**	**1st**

Awards and achievements
Preceded by Andrew Thompson	Jon Targett Perpetual Karting Trophy; 2001	Succeeded by Ben Chong Sun
