= 2008 Australian Drivers' Championship =

Motor racing competition

Seasons
- ← 2007 2009 →

The 2008 Australian Drivers' Championship was a CAMS sanctioned national motor racing title which was contested concurrently with the 2008 Kumho Tyres Australian Formula 3 Championship. The championship winner was awarded the 2008 CAMS Gold Star. The 2008 championship was the 52nd Australian Drivers' Championship and the fourth to be contested with open wheel racing cars constructed in accordance with FIA Formula 3 regulations. The season began on 3 February 2008 at Eastern Creek Raceway and finished on 21 September at Symmons Plains Raceway after eight rounds across four different states with two races per round.

The series was won by a British driver for the second time in three years, with James Winslow victorious after a season long battle with Leanne Tander, who was runner up by only a few points for the second year in a row. Chris Gilmour won the National Class from Irish driver Lee Farrell, while Andrew Mill clinched the Trophy Class with a round in hand.

== Class structure ==
Drivers competed in three classes:

- Championship Class – restricted to cars constructed in accordance with the FIA Formula 3 regulations that applied between 1 January 1999 and 31 December 2007
- National Class – restricted to cars constructed in accordance with the FIA Formula 3 regulations that applied between 1 January 1999 and 31 December 2004
- Trophy Class – restricted to cars constructed in accordance with the FIA Formula 3 regulations that applied between 1 January 1995 and 31 December 2001

== Points system ==
Championship points were awarded on a 20–15–12–10–8–6–4–3–2–1 basis to the top ten classified finishers in the Championship Class in each race. An additional point was awarded to the driver gaining the Championship Class pole position for each race and a further additional point was awarded to the driver setting the fastest lap in the Championship class in each race. To secure the "fastest lap" point the driver must have been declared finisher for that race.

The same point-score system was also used for both the National Class and the Trophy Class.

== Teams and drivers ==
The following teams and drivers competed during the 2008 Australian Formula 3 season. The listing relates to both the 2008 Australian Drivers' Championship and to the non-championship Indy F3 Challenge races.

Team	Class	Chassis	Engine	No	Driver
Scud Racing	National	Dallara F301	Spiess-Opel	1	(Australia) Tim Macrow
Scud Racing	Trophy	Dallara F301	Spiess-Opel	25	(Australia) Justin Tate (Australia) Roman Krumins
Scud Racing	Championship	Dallara F307	HWA-Mercedes-Benz	35	(Australia) Stuart Kostera
Scud Racing	National	Dallara F304	Spiess-Opel	89	(New Zealand) Mathew Radisich
Team BRM	Championship	Dallara F307	HWA-Mercedes-Benz	1	(United Kingdom) James Winslow
Team BRM	Championship	Dallara F307	HWA-Mercedes-Benz	3	(United Kingdom) James Winslow (Australia) John Magro (Lebanon) Chris Alajajian (Indonesia) Zahir Ali *
Team BRM	Championship	Dallara F307	HWA-Mercedes-Benz	4	(New Zealand) Earl Bamber (Australia) Nick Percat (United Kingdom) James Winslow
Team BRM	Championship	Dallara F307	HWA-Mercedes-Benz	5	(Australia) Nathan Caratti
Team BRM	National	Dallara F304	Spiess-Opel	6	(United Kingdom) Lee Farrell
Team BRM	Championship	Dallara F307	HWA-Mercedes-Benz	9	(United Kingdom) Ben Clucas
Transwest Racing	Championship	Dallara F307	Mugen-Honda	2	(Australia) Mat Sofi
Transwest Racing	National	Dallara F304	Mugen-Honda	20	(Australia) James Crozier
R-Tek Motorsport Services	National	Dallara F304	Spiess-Opel	7	(Australia) Chris Reindler (Australia) Karl Reindler (Colombia) Carlos Huertas *
R-Tek Motorsport Services	Trophy	Dallara F301	Spiess-Opel	59	(Australia) Jesse Wakeman
Astuti Motorsport	Championship	Dallara F307	Sodemo-Renault	11	(United Kingdom) James Winslow (Indonesia) Maher Algadrie (Lebanon) Chris Alajajian
Astuti Motorsport	Championship	Dallara F304	Sodemo-Renault	23	(Australia) Ray Chamberlain
Astuti Motorsport	National	Dallara F304	Sodemo-Renault	24	(Australia) Daniel Schulz (Australia) Ash Samadi (Australia) Andrew Mill
JB Motorsport	Trophy	Dallara F301	Novamotor-Fiat	12	(Australia) John Boothman (Australia) Brian Sampson
Property Solutions Group	Trophy	Dallara F301	Spiess-Opel	16	(Australia) Andrew Mill (Australia) Kevin Miller
Property Solutions Group	Trophy	Dallara F301	Sodemo-Renault	86	(Australia) Kevin Miller
Gilmour Racing	National	Dallara F304	Spiess-Opel	17	(Australia) Chris Gilmour
Morcraft Homes	Championship	Dallara F307	HWA-Mercedes-Benz	18	(Australia) Steve Morcombe
David Choon	Trophy	Dallara F396	Mugen Honda	19	(Australia) David Choon
GKH Powdercoating	National	Dallara F304	Spiess-Opel	21	(Australia) Graeme Holmes
Chris Alajajian	Championship	Dallara F304	Sodemo-Renault	22	(Lebanon) Chris Alajajian
Piccola Scuderia Corse	National	Dallara F304	Spiess-Opel	26	(Australia) Daniel Cotton (Australia) Troy Woodger (Australia) John Whelan (Australia) Justin Tate
Piccola Scuderia Corse	Championship	Dallara F307	HWA-Mercedes-Benz	27	(Australia) Neil McFadyen (Australia) Justin Tate (Australia) John Martin *
Piccola Scuderia Corse	National	Dallara F304	Spiess-Opel	28	(Australia) Ash Bettridge
Tandersport	National	Dallara F304	Spiess-Opel	32	(New Zealand) Matthew Radisich
Tandersport	Championship	Dallara F307	HWA-Mercedes-Benz	42	(Australia) Leanne Tander
Tandersport	National	Dallara F304	Spiess-Opel	52	(Australia) Chris Reindler (Australia) Samantha Reid (New Zealand) Ben Crighton
National Surgical	Trophy	Dallara F301		32	(Australia) Jon Mills
Hack, Anderson & Thomas	Trophy	Dallara F396	Toyota	37	(Australia) Rod Anderson
Ausdeck Patios & Roofing	Trophy	Dallara F301		96	(Australia) Jonathan Grant *

'* - John Martin, Zahir Ali, Carlos Huertas & Jonathan Grant contested the non-championship Indy F3 Challenge races but did not contest rounds of the 2008 Australian Drivers' Championship.

== Race calendar ==
Round	Race	Circuit	Date	Pole position	Fastest lap	Winning driver	Winning team
1	1	(New South Wales) Eastern Creek Raceway	3 February	(Australia) Leanne Tander	(Australia) Neil McFadyen	(Australia) Nathan Caratti	(Australia) Team BRM
1	2	(New South Wales) Eastern Creek Raceway	3 February	(Australia) Nathan Caratti	race cancelled by heavy rain		
2	1	(South Australia) Adelaide Street Circuit	24 February	(Australia) Neil McFadyen	(New Zealand) Earl Bamber	(Australia) Neil McFadyen	(Australia) Piccola Scuderia Corse
2	2	(South Australia) Adelaide Street Circuit	24 February	(Australia) Neil McFadyen	(United Kingdom) Ben Clucas	(United Kingdom) Ben Clucas	(Australia) Team BRM
3	1	(New South Wales) Oran Park Raceway	27 April	(Australia) Neil McFadyen	(Australia) Leanne Tander	(Australia) Leanne Tander	(Australia) Tandersport
3	2	(New South Wales) Oran Park Raceway	27 April	(Australia) Neil McFadyen	(Australia) Nathan Caratti	(United Kingdom) James Winslow	(Australia) Astuti Motorsport
4	1	(South Australia) Mallala Motor Sport Park	18 May	(Australia) Leanne Tander	(Australia) Nathan Caratti	(Australia) Leanne Tander	(Australia) Tandersport
4	2	(South Australia) Mallala Motor Sport Park	18 May	(Australia) Neil McFadyen	(Australia) Leanne Tander	(Australia) Nathan Caratti	(Australia) Team BRM
5	1	(Victoria (state)) Phillip Island	15 June	(Australia) Leanne Tander	(Australia) Mat Sofi	(Australia) Nathan Caratti	(Australia) Team BRM
5	2	(Victoria (state)) Phillip Island	15 June	(United Kingdom) James Winslow	(Australia) Leanne Tander	(United Kingdom) James Winslow	(Australia) Team BRM
6	1	(New South Wales) Eastern Creek Raceway	13 July	(Australia) Nathan Caratti	(United Kingdom) James Winslow	(Australia) Leanne Tander	(Australia) Tandersport
6	2	(New South Wales) Eastern Creek Raceway	13 July	(Australia) Nathan Caratti	(Australia) Nathan Caratti	(United Kingdom) James Winslow	(Australia) Team BRM
7	1	(Victoria (state)) Phillip Island	10 August	(Australia) Leanne Tander	(United Kingdom) James Winslow	(United Kingdom) James Winslow	(Australia) Team BRM
7	2	(Victoria (state)) Phillip Island	10 August	(United Kingdom) James Winslow	(United Kingdom) James Winslow	(Australia) Leanne Tander	(Australia) Tandersport
8	1	(Tasmania) Symmons Plains Raceway	21 September	(New Zealand) Mathew Radisich	(United Kingdom) James Winslow	(United Kingdom) James Winslow	(Australia) Team BRM
8	2	(Tasmania) Tasmanian Super Prix	21 September	(United Kingdom) James Winslow	(Australia) Nathan Caratti	(Australia) Leanne Tander	(Australia) Tandersport
NC	1	(Queensland) Indy F3 Challenge	23 October	(Australia) John Martin	(Australia) John Martin	(Australia) John Martin	(Australia) Piccola Scuderia Corse
NC	2	(Queensland) Indy F3 Challenge	24 October	progressive grid	(Australia) John Martin	(Australia) John Martin	(Australia) Piccola Scuderia Corse
NC	3	(Queensland) Indy F3 Challenge	25 October	progressive grid	(Australia) John Martin	(United Kingdom) James Winslow	(Australia) Team BRM

== Results and standings ==
=== Drivers championship ===
Pos	Driver	EAS 1	EAS 2	ADE 1	ADE 2	ORA 1	ORA 2	MAL 1	MAL 2	PHI 1	PHI 2	EAS 3	EAS 4	PHI 3	PHI 4	SYM 1	SYM 2	Pts
CHAMPIONSHIP CLASS
1	(United Kingdom) James Winslow	2		4	3	2	1	10	5	15	1	6	1	1	2	1	Ret	198
2	(Australia) Leanne Tander	3		6	Ret	1	5	1	2	2	5	1	2	8	1	Ret	1	194
3	(Australia) Nathan Caratti	1		5	Ret	3	2	2	1	1	2	4	12	Ret	15	10	2	170
4	(Australia) Mat Sofi	6		7	5	4	6	5	10	4	3	3	7	3	3	4	4	136
5	(Australia) Neil McFadyen	5		1	2	5	3	6	3	DSQ	4							99
6	(Australia) Stuart Kostera	7		8	4	Ret	11	Ret	7	3	10	9	5	Ret	4	2	5	92
7	(Australia) Ray Chamberlain	19		17	12	12	13	14	16	11	13	16	16	10	10	7	11	64
8	(New Zealand) Nick Percat					6	4	4	4									38
9	(Australia) Justin Tate											5	6	2	6			37
10	(United Kingdom) Ben Clucas			2	1													36
10	(Australia) John Magro							11	9	14	8			4	5			36
12	(Lebanon) Chris Alajajian											2	3					27
13	(New Zealand) Earl Bamber	4		3	Ret													23
14	(Australia) Steve Morcombe											10	13	12	11			13
15	(Indonesia) Maher Algadrie													13	12			5
NATIONAL CLASS
1	(Australia) Chris Gilmour	9		11	6	7	7	7	12	7	5	14	8	6	8	9	8	228
2	(United Kingdom) Lee Farrell	8		9	17	Ret	Ret	9	8	6	7	11	11	5	7	Ret	6	189
3	(Australia) Tim Macrow									Ret	Ret	7	4			3	3	89
4	(New Zealand) Ben Crighton					9	9			Ret	Ret	8	14	7	Ret	8	7	86
5	(New Zealand) Mathew Radisich	11		12	8	DNS	DNS			8	9	17	9	Ret	Ret	Ret	10	85
6	(Australia) Ash Bettridge									10	12	13	15	Ret	12			48
7	(Australia) Karl Reindler							3	6									43
8	(Australia) Daniel Schulz	12		10	7													39
9	(Australia) Justin Tate							8	11	Ret	DNS							24
10	(Australia) Ash Samadhi					Ret	8	Ret	13	Ret	DNS							23
11	(Australia) Chris Reindler	10		21	Ret													17
12	(Australia) Samantha Reid			20	10													16
13	(Australia) James Crozier	13		23	14													16
14	(Australia) Andrew Mill															6	Ret	15
15	(Australia) John Whelan					10	Ret											12
16	(Australia) Graeme Holmes	15		15	Ret	DNS	DNS											12
17	(Australia) Daniel Cotton	17																3
18	(Australia) Troy Woodger			22	Ret													3
TROPHY CLASS
1	(Australia) Andrew Mill	14		13	11	8	10	12	15	Ret	14	12	10	9	9			247
2	(Australia) Jesse Wakeman	16		16	16	DNS	DNS	13	14	9	11					9	11	157
3	(Australia) Rod Anderson	20		18	13	11	12	15	DNS	13	16	15	17			11	12	156
4	(Australia) Justin Tate	21		14	9	Ret	DNS											46
5	(Australia) John Boothman	18		19	15													30
5	(Australia) Roman Krumins													11	13			30
7	(Australia) Brian Sampson									12	15							28
8	(Australia) David Choon					13	Ret											12
NC	(Australia) Kevin Miller	DNS																0

Colour	Result
Gold	Winner
Silver	Second place
Bronze	Third place
Green	Points classification
Blue	Non-points classification
Blue	Non-classified finish (NC)
Purple	Retired, not classified (Ret)
Red	Did not qualify (DNQ)
Red	Did not pre-qualify (DNPQ)
Black	Disqualified (DSQ)
White	Did not start (DNS)
White	Withdrew (WD)
White	Race cancelled (C)
Blank	Did not practice (DNP)
Blank	Did not arrive (DNA)
Blank	Excluded (EX)

Note: Race 2 of Round 1 was abandoned due to torrential rain and no points were awarded.

=== Indy F3 Challenge ===
The Indy F3 Challenge was a three race support event for Australian Formula 3 cars at the 2008 Nikon Indy 300 meeting at the Surfers Paradise Street Circuit. It was not a round of the 2008 Australian Drivers' Championship.

Pos.	Driver	Qualifying	Race 1	Race 2	Race 3	Points
1	(Australia) John Martin	1	1	1	2	59
2	(United Kingdom) James Winslow	2	2	2	1	50
3	(Australia) Leanne Tander	5	4	3	Ret	22
4	(Lebanon) Chris Alajajian	3	3	4	Ret	22
5	(Australia) Mat Sofi	6	Ret	7	3	16
6	(Australia) Chris Gilmour	8	8	8	4	16
7	(Australia) Nathan Caratti	4	5	5	Ret	16
8	(Australia) Jesse Wakeman	11	10	10	5	10
9	(Indonesia) Zahir Ali	9	7	6	Ret	10
10	(Australia) Steve Morcombe	13	11	11	6	6
11	(Colombia) Carlos Huertas	7	6	Ret	Ret	6
12	(Australia) Jonathan Grant	12	Ret	12	7	4
13	(New Zealand) Ben Crighton	10	9	9	Ret	4
14	(Australia) Jon Mills	15	Ret	Ret	8	3
15	(Australia) Kevin Miller	14	Ret	13	Ret	0

== See also ==
- Australian Drivers' Championship
- Australian Formula 3
