= Chris Alajajian =

Australian racing driver

- Nationality: Australian; Armenian via dual nationality
- Born: 31 October 1986 (age 40) Sydney, New South Wales, Australia

V8 Supercars Development Series
- Years active: 2006–2007, 2009, 2013
- Teams: Jack Hillerman Racing; Jay Motorsport; Nandi Kiss Racing
- Starts: 28
- Wins: 1
- Podiums: 2
- Fastest laps: 0
- Best finish: 25th in 2006

Previous series
- 2009–10 2007–08 2006–07 2004–08 2004–05 2003–04: Australian Mini Challenge; A1 Grand Prix; Fujitsu V8 Supercar Series; Australian Formula 3 Australian Performance Car Championship; Australian Production Car Championship

Championship titles
- 2004 2010: Australian Production Car Championship; Australian Mini Challenge

Christopher Alajajian (born 31 October 1986) is an Australian-Armenian former race car driver.

== Biography ==
=== Early career ===
In 2004, Alajajian won the Australian Production Car Championship, becoming the youngest ever driver to win an Australian championship. In the same year, he also contested some rounds of the Australian Formula 3 Championship with Piccola Scuderia and raced in the Australian GT Performance Car Championship.

Continuing in Australian Formula 3 in 2005, Alajajian started the year with Astuti Competition, before moving to Protecnica Racing. He finished third in the championship. He also won a number of races in the Australian Performance Car Championship with Protecnica Racing.

=== V8 Supercars Development Series ===
Alajajian moved to the Fujitsu V8 Supercar Series for 2006. He scored a podium at Queensland Raceway and was involved in Mark Porter's fatal crash at Bathurst later in the season. He continued in the Fujitsu V8 Supercar Series 2007, claiming his only race win at the second round at Wakefield Park Raceway. He made one-off appearances at the Adelaide Street Circuit in 2009 and 2013.

=== A1 Grand Prix ===
In August 2007, Alajajian tested for A1 Team Lebanon in the A1 Grand Prix series at Snetterton Circuit. Alajajian made his race debut in the series at the Dutch round in the 2007–08 season. After missing round 2 in Brno, he raced the next four rounds, being in a points scoring position in New Zealand before being hit from behind, and was second quickest in Rookie Qualifying at Eastern Creek.

=== Mini Challenge ===
Alajajian finished runner-up in the Australian Mini Challenge in 2009 and won the championship in 2010. He represented Australia in the 2010 European MINI Challenge in Spain.

== Career results ==
Season	Series	Position	Car	Team
2003	Australian Production Car Championship	6th	BMW 323i	Novocastrian Motorsport
2003	Australian Production Car Championship - Class B	**3rd**	BMW 323i	Novocastrian Motorsport
2004	Australian Formula 3 Championship	8th	Dallara F301 Spiess Opel	Protecnica
2004	Australian GT Performance Car Championship	27th	Subaru Impreza WRX STi	Protecnica
2004	Australian Production Car Championship	**1st**	Subaru Liberty GT	Protecnica
2005	Australian Drivers' Championship (1)	**3rd**	Dallara F304 Sodemo Renault	Protecnica
2005	Australian Performance Car Championship	11th	Subaru Impreza WRX STi	Protecnica
2006	Fujitsu V8 Supercar Series	25th	Holden Commodore VZ	Jack Hillerman Racing
2006	Australian Performance Car Championship – Privateers Cup	6th	Subaru Liberty GT	Jack Hillerman Racing
2006	Australian Drivers' Championship (1)	6th	Dallara F304 Sodemo Renault	Protecnica
2007	Australian Drivers' Championship (1)	12th	Dallara F304 Sodemo Renault	Protecnica
2007	Fujitsu V8 Supercar Series	34th	Holden Commodore VZ	Jack Hillerman Racing
2007–08	A1 Grand Prix	22nd (2)	Lola–Zytek A1GP	A1 Team Lebanon
2008	Australian Drivers' Championship (1)	12th	Dallara F307 HWA-Mercedes-Benz	Team BRM
2009	Australian Mini Challenge	**2nd**	Mini JCW R56	Jack Hillerman Racing
2010	Australian Mini Challenge	**1st**	Mini JCW R56	Jack Hillerman Racing
2013	Dunlop V8 Supercar Series	38th	Holden Commodore VE	Nandi Kiss Racing

- (1) = Contested concurrently with the Australian Formula 3 Championship
- (2) = Team standings.

=== Complete Australian Formula 3 results ===
(key) (Races in bold indicate pole position) (Races in italics indicate fastest lap)

Year	Team	Car	1	2	3	4	5	6	7	8	9	10	11	12	13	14	15	16	17	18	19	Position	Points
2004	Rudolf Masi	Dallara F301-Alfa Romeo	ADE	ADE	ORA	ORA	QLD	QLD	SAN	SAN	WIN	WIN	ECK; 7	ECK; 6	WAK	WAK	MAL	MAL	SUR; 5	SUR; 2	SUR; 3	8th	45
2005	Jack Hillerman Smash	Dallara F304-Renault Sodemo	**WAK**; **1**	WAK; 3	MAL; 4	MAL; 3	PHI; 7	PHI; Ret	QLD; 3	QLD; 2	ECK; 2	ECK; 2	PHI	PHI	ECK; 3	ECK; 1	**ECK**; **3**	ECK; 1				3rd	178
2006	Jack Hillerman Smash	Dallara F304-Renault Sodemo	WAK; 2	WAK; 6	SYM; 2	SYM; 2	PHI	PHI	MAL	MAL	ECK; 4	ECK; 4	PHI	PHI	QLD	QLD	ORA; Ret	ORA; 4				6th	82
2007	Team BRM	Dallara F304-Renault Sodemo	**ECK**; **2**	**ECK**; **2**	ORA	ORA	PHI	PHI	MAL	MAL	ECK	ECK	PHI	PHI	SYM	SYM	ORA	ORA				12th	32
2008	Team BRM	Dallara F307-HWA-Mercedes-Benz	ECK	ECK; C	ADE	ADE	ORA	ORA	MAL	MAL	PHI	PHI	ECK; 2	ECK; 3	PHI	PHI	SYM	SYM	SUR; 3	SUR; 4	SUR; Ret	12th	27

=== Complete V8 Development Series results ===
(key) (Races in bold indicate pole position) (Races in italics indicate fastest lap)

Year	Team	Car	1	2	3	4	5	6	7	8	9	10	11	12	13	14	15	16	17	18	Position	Points
2006	Jack Hillerman Racing	Holden VZ Commodore	ADE	ADE	WAK	WAK	WAK	QLD; 28	QLD; 2	QLD; Ret	ORA; 11	ORA; 24	ORA; 7	MAL; 4	MAL; 19	MAL; 11	BAT; 30	BAT; Ret	PHI; Ret	PHI; 14	25th	634
2007	Jack Hillerman Racing	Holden VZ Commodore	ADE	ADE	WAK; 1	WAK; Ret	WAK; Ret	WIN; Ret	WIN; 17	WIN; 19	QLD; Ret	QLD; Ret	QLD; DNS	ORA; Ret	ORA; 15	ORA; 17	BAT; Ret	BAT; DNS	PHI	PHI	34th	16
2009	Jay Motorsport	Holden VZ Commodore	ADE; Ret	ADE; DNS	WIN	WIN	WIN	TOW	TOW	TOW	SAN	SAN	SAN	QLD	QLD	QLD	BAT	BAT	HOM	HOM	NC	0
2013	Nandi Kiss Racing	Holden VE Commodore	ADE; 23	ADE; 20	BAR	BAR	BAR	TOW	TOW	TOW	QLD	QLD	QLD	WIN	WIN	WIN	BAT	BAT	HOM	HOM	38th	81

† Not Eligible for points

=== Complete A1 Grand Prix results ===
(key) (Races in bold indicate pole position) (Races in italics indicate fastest lap)

Year	Entrant	1	2	3	4	5	6	7	8	9	10	11	12	13	14	15	16	17	18	19	20	DC	Points
2007–08	A1 Team Lebanon	NED; SPR; 14	NED; FEA; 19	CZE; SPR	CZE; FEA	MYS; SPR; 14	MYS; FEA; Ret	CHN; SPR; Ret	CHN; FEA; 13	NZL; SPR; 15	NZL; FEA; Ret	AUS; SPR; 19	AUS; FEA; 19	RSA; SPR	RSA; FEA	MEX; SPR	MEX; FEA	CHN; SPR	CHN; FEA	GBR; SPR	GBR; SPR	22nd	0

=== Complete Bathurst 12 Hour results ===
Year	Team	Co-drivers	Car	Class	Laps	Overall position	Class position
2007	Subaru Australia	(Australia) Grant Denyer (Australia) Neil Crompton	Subaru Impreza WRX Sti Spec C	B	248	5th	**3rd**

Sporting positions
Preceded by Scott Loadsman	Winner of the Australian Production Car Championship; 2004	Succeeded by Colin Osborne
Preceded by Paul Stokell	Winner of the Australian Mini Challenge; 2010	Succeeded by Beric Lynton (Mini Cup)
