= 2003 Australian Production Car Championship =

The 2003 Australian Production Car Championship was a CAMS sanctioned Australian motor racing championship open to Group 3E Series Production Cars. The championship, which was organised by Procar Australia as part of the 2003 PROCAR Champ Series, was the 10th Australian Production Car Championship and the first to be contested since 1995. The Outright Drivers Championship was won by Scott Loadsman, driving a Holden VX Commodore SS.

== Race Calendar ==
The 2003 Australian Production Car Championship was contested over a seven-round series.

| Round | Circuit | Date | Format |
| 1 | Adelaide Parklands Circuit | 21–23 March | Two races |
| 2 | Symmons Plains International Raceway | 25–27 April | Two races |
| 3 | Wakefield Park | 30 May - 1 June | Two races |
| 4 | Queensland Raceway | 13–15 June | Two races |
| 5 | Oran Park Grand Prix Circuit | 11–13 July | Two races |
| 6 | Phillip Island Grand Prix Circuit | 8–10 August | Two races |
| 7 | Winton Motor Raceway | 19–21 September | Two races |

== Classes ==
Car competed in four classes, grouped by performance rather than by engine or vehicle type.

== Points system ==
Outright Drivers Championship points were awarded in each race as shown on the following table.

| Position | 1st | 2nd | 3rd | 4th | 5th | 6th | 7th | 8th | 9th | 10th | 11th | 12th | 13th | 14th | 15th |
| Points | 30 | 20 | 16 | 13 | 11 | 10 | 9 | 8 | 7 | 6 | 5 | 4 | 3 | 2 | 1 |

In addition, three championship points were awarded to the driver who obtained pole position for Race 1 from the Qualifying session at each round.

Drivers Class Championship points were awarded on the same basis as Outright Drivers Championship points.

Manufacturers Trophy points were awarded on the same basis as Drivers Class Championship points.

== Results ==
=== Outright Drivers Championship ===
| Position | Driver | No. | Car | Entrant | Points |
| 1 | Scott Loadsman | 62 | Holden VX Commodore SS | Solace / Wakeling Holden | 268 |
| 2 | Steve Grocl | 35 | Volkswagen Beetle RSi | J & F Motors Pty Ltd | 238 |
| 3 | David Russell | 67 | Proton Satria GTi | Team Satria Racing | 197 |
| 4 | David Ratcliff | 6 & 31 | Toyota Celica SX | Nepean EFI & Osborne Motorsport | 181 |
| 5 | Craig Bradshaw | 8 | Ford AUII Falcon XR8 | Craig Bradshaw | 145 |
| 6 | Chris Alajajian | 27 | BMW 323i | Hillermans Smash Repairs | 129 |
| 7 | Martin Doxey | 17 | Holden Astra SRi | Holden / Bilstein / CVG | 94 |
| 8 | Geoff Russell | 68 | Proton Satria GTi | Team Satria Racing | 86 |
| 9 | Colin Osborne | 13 | Toyota Celica SX | Osborne Motorsport | 82 |
| 10 | Darren Palmer | 28 | Honda S2000 | Poolrite | 79 |
| 11 | Rick Bates | 22 | Daihatsu Sirion GTVi | Daihatsu Australia Pty Ltd | 74 |
| 12 | Dave Mertens | 71 | Holden Vectra GL | Holden / Bilstein / CVG | 66 |
| 13 | John McIlroy | 95 | Ford AUII Falcon XR8; Ford BA Falcon XR6 Turbo | Southern Rural Ford Dealers | 64 |
| 14 | AJ Lewis | 55 | Toyota Camry CSi | John Cameron Motorsport | 40 |
| 15 | Richard Hing | 88 | Mitsubishi FTO GPX | Millenium Audio Visual | 33 |
| 16 | Andrew Leithhead | 156 | Alfa Romeo 156 GTA | GTA Racing | 28 |
| 17 | Carol Jackson | 10 | Honda Civic VTi-R | Carol Jackson | 23 |
| 18 | Len Cave | 31 | Toyota Celica SX | Osborne Motorsport | 21 |
| 19 | Rob Rubis | 31 | Toyota Celica SX | Osborne Motorsport | 18 |
| = | Mark Westbrook | 28 | Honda S2000 | Sovereign Petroleum | 18 |
| = | Allan Shephard | 44 | Honda Integra Type-R | Thrifty Car Rental | 18 |
| 22 | Bill Fulton | 28 | Honda S2000 | Formula Green / Poolrite | 16 |
| = | Leanne Ferrier | 22 | Daihatsu Sirion GTVi | Daihatsu Motor Corporation | 16 |
| 24 | Ian Luff | 54 | Honda Integra Type-R | Formica | 11 |
| = | Brian Carr | 49 | Ford Falcon XR8 | Osborne Motorsport | 11 |
| 26 | Trevor Keene | | | | 8 |
| 27 | Graham Roylett | 21 | Proton Satria GTi | Autobarn / Erier Plumbing | 6 |

=== Class Drivers Championships ===
| Position | Driver | No. | Car | Entrant | Points |
| | Class A | | | | |
| 1 | Scott Loadsman | 62 | Holden VX Commodore SS | Solace / Wakeling Holden | 352 |
| 2 | Craig Bradshaw | 8 | Ford AUII Falcon XR8 | Craig Bradshaw | 198 |
| 3 | Darren Palmer | 28 | Honda S2000 | Poolrite | 90 |
| 4 | John McIlroy | 95 | Ford AUII Falcon XR8; Ford BA Falcon XR6 Turbo | Southern Rural Ford Dealers | 88 |
| 5 | Mark Westbrook | 28 | Honda S2000 | Sovereign Petroleum | 69 |
| 6 | Brian Carr | 49 | Ford Falcon XR8 | Osborne Motorsport | 32 |
| 7 | Bill Fulton | 28 | Honda S2000 | Formula Green / Poolrite | 20 |
| | Class B | | | | |
| 1 | Steve Grocl | 35 | Volkswagen Beetle RSi | J & F Motors Pty Ltd | 374 |
| 2 | David Ratcliff | 6 | Toyota Celica SX | Nepean EFI | 265 |
| 3 | Chris Alajajian | 27 | BMW 323i | Hillermans Smash Repairs | 210 |
| 4 | Colin Osborne | 13 | Toyota Celica SX | Osborne Motorsport | 130 |
| 5 | Andrew Leithhead | 156 | Alfa Romeo 156 GTA | GTA Racing | 74 |
| 6 | Allan Shephard | 44 | Honda Integra Type-R | Thrifty Car Rental | 62 |
| = | Richard Hing | 88 | Mitsubishi FTO GPX | Millenium Audio Visual | 62 |
| 8 | Rob Rubis | 31 | Toyota Celica SX | Osborne Motorsport | 26 |
| 9 | Len Cave | 31 | Toyota Celica SX | Osborne Motorsport | 24 |
| 10 | Trevor Keene | | | | 22 |
| 11 | Ian Luff | 54 | Honda Integra Type-R | Formica | 20 |
| | Class C | | | | |
| 1 | AJ Lewis | 55 | Toyota Camry CSi | John Cameron Motorsport | 96 |
| | Class D | | | | |
| 1 | David Russell | 67 | Proton Satria GTi | Team Satria Racing | 341 |
| 2 | Martin Doxey | 17 | Holden Astra SRi | Holden / Bilstein / CVG | 232 |
| 3 | Geoff Russell | 68 | Proton Satria GTi | Team Satria Racing | 225 |
| 4 | Dave Mertens | 71 | Holden Vectra GL | Holden / Bilstein / CVG | 179 |
| 5 | Rick Bates | 22 | Daihatsu Sirion GTVi | Daihatsu Australia Pty Ltd | 164 |
| 6 | Leanne Ferrier | 22 | Daihatsu Sirion GTVi | Daihatsu Motor Corporation | 45 |
| 7 | Carol Jackson | 10 | Honda Civic VTi-R | Carol Jackson | 40 |
| 8 | Graham Roylett | 21 | Proton Satria GTi | Autobarn / Erier Plumbing | 23 |
| 9 | Matthew Jackson | 10 | Honda Civic VTi-R | Carol Jackson | 13 |

=== Manufacturers Trophy ===
| Position | Manufacturer | Points |
| 1 | Holden | 763 |
| 2 | Toyota | 593 |
| 3 | Proton | 589 |
| 4 | Volkswagen | 374 |
| 5 | Ford | 318 |
| 6 | Honda | 310 |
| 7 | BMW | 210 |
| 8 | Daihatsu | 209 |
| 9 | Alfa Romeo | 74 |
| 10 | Mitsubishi | 62 |
