= Sodemo V2-1.2 =

French aircraft engine

V2-1.2
- Type: Aircraft engine
- National origin: France
- Manufacturer: Sodemo

The Sodemo V2-1.2 is a French aircraft engine, designed and produced by Sodemo of Magny-Cours, for use in light aircraft.

== Design and development ==
The engine is a 90° V-twin-cylinder four-stroke, 1,200 cc (73.2 cu in) displacement, liquid-cooled, petrol engine design, with a mechanical helical-gear gearbox reduction drive. It employs dual capacitor discharge ignition and produces 136 hp (101 kW).

== Specifications (V2-1.2) ==
Data from Tacke

=== General characteristics ===
- Type: V-twin, four-stroke aircraft engine
- Displacement: 992 cc (60.5 cu in)

=== Components ===
- Fuel type: petrol
- Cooling system: liquid

=== Performance ===
- Power output: 136 hp (101 kW)

== See also ==
Related development

- Sodemo V2-1.0

Related lists

- List of aircraft engines
