= 2006 Australian Drivers' Championship =

Motor racing competition

Seasons
- ← 2005 2007 →

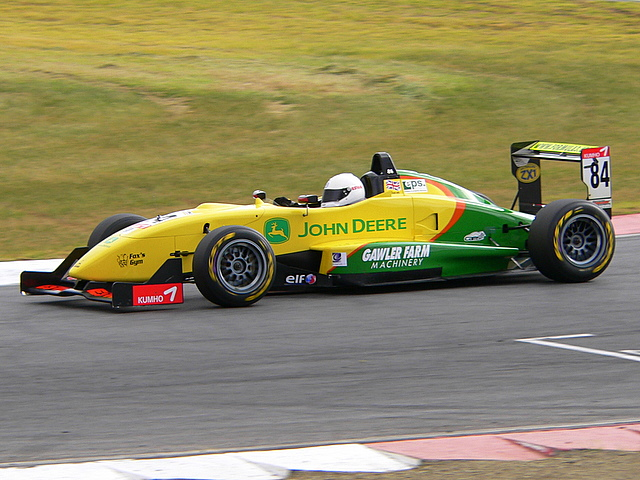
2006 Australian Drivers' Champion Ben Clucas at the Mallala round of the championship

The 2006 Australian Drivers' Championship was a CAMS sanctioned national motor racing title open to Formula 3 cars. The title was contested over an eight-round, 16 race series, with the winner being awarded the 2006 CAMS Gold Star. The series was organised and administered by Formula 3 Australia Inc. and was officially known as the "2006 Khumo Tyres Australian Formula 3 Championship for the Australian Drivers' Championship". It is recognised by CAMS as the 50th Australian Drivers' Championship and as the 6th Australian Formula 3 Championship.

British driver Ben Clucas dominated the series driving a Team BRM Dallara F304-Spiess Opel. Clucas won eleven of the twelve races he contested, finishing 52 points ahead of Tim Macrow (Dallara F301-Spiess Opel). Michael Trimble finished third in the points standings, driving a Dallara F304-Renault. Macrow was the only driver to defeat Clucas for a race win before the British driver left the series after Round 6 with an unassailable lead in the points. Macrow also won three of the other four races with Trimble winning the first of the two races held at Queensland Raceway.

== Calendar ==
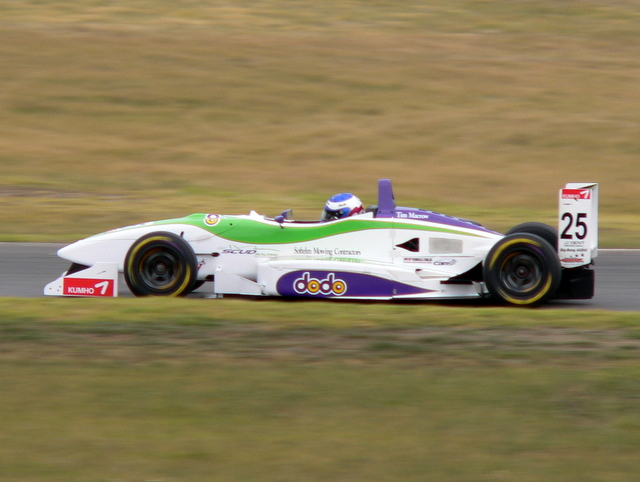
Tim Macrow placed 2nd in the championship

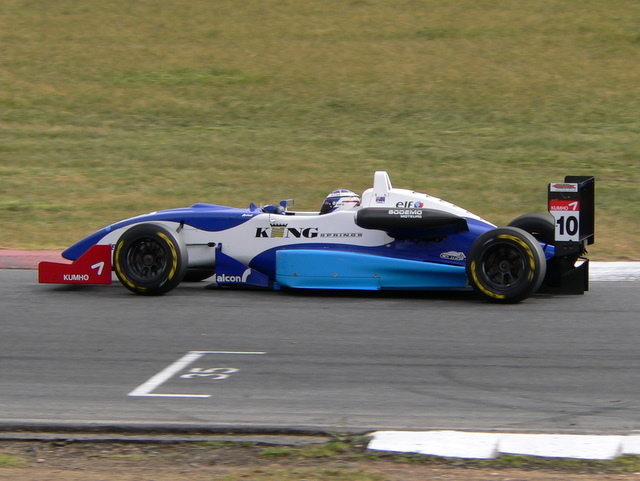
Michael Trimble placed 3rd in the championship

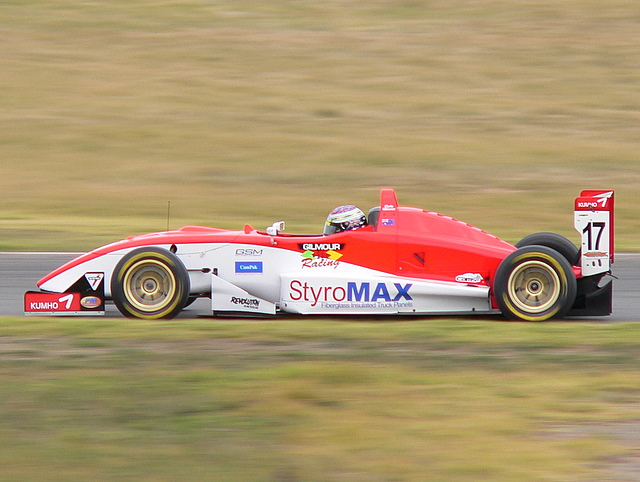
Chris Gilmour placed 4th in the championship

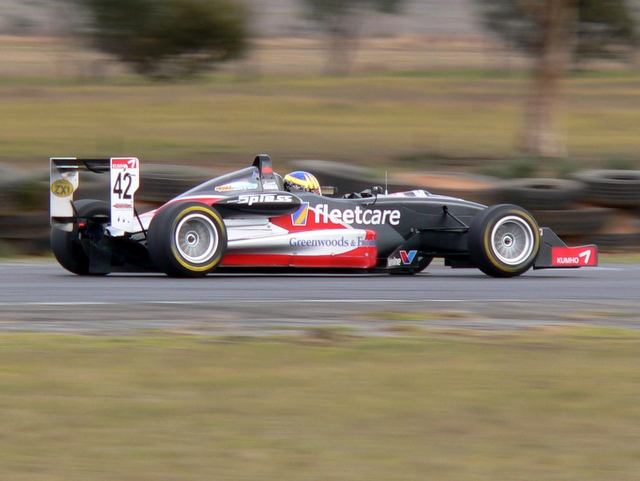
Leanne Tander placed 5th in the championship

The championship was contested over an eight-round series with two races per round.

| Rd | Circuit | State | Date |
| 1 | Wakefield Park Raceway | New South Wales | 3–5 March |
| 2 | Symmons Plains International Raceway | Tasmania | 7–9 April |
| 3 | Phillip Island Grand Prix Circuit | Victoria | 19–21 May |
| 4 | Mallala Motor Sport Park | South Australia | 23–25 June |
| 5 | Eastern Creek International Raceway | New South Wales | 7–9 July |
| 6 | Phillip Island Grand Prix Circuit | Victoria | 18–20 August |
| 7 | Queensland Raceway, Ipswich | Queensland | 2–3 September |
| 8 | Oran Park Raceway | New South Wales | 28–29 October |

== Class structure ==
Cars competed in three classes:

- Formula 3 Championship: Cars constructed in accordance with FIA Formula 3 regulations that applied in the year of manufacture between 1 January 1999 and 31 December 2004
- Formula 3 National Class: Cars constructed in accordance with FIA Formula 3 regulations that applied in the year of manufacture between 1 January 1999 and 31 December 2001
- Formula 3 Trophy Class: Cars constructed in accordance with FIA Formula 3 regulations that applied in the year of manufacture between 1 January 1995 and 31 December 1998

The relevant FIA Formula 3 regulations were subject to specific amendments for Australian competition, as outlined in the championship regulations.

== Points system ==
Points were awarded on a 20–15–12–10–8–6–4–3–2–1 basis for the first ten positions in each class in each race. One point was awarded to the driver setting the fastest qualifying time in each class for each race and one point was awarded to the driver setting the fastest race lap in each class in each race, but only if that driver was classified as a finisher in the race.

== Championship results ==
| | | | | | Wakefield Pk. | | Symmons Pl. | | Phillip Island | | Mallala | | Eastern Ck. | | Phillip Island | | Qld. Raceway | | Oran Park | | Total |
| Position | Driver | No. | Car | Entrant | R1 | R2 | R1 | R2 | R1 | R2 | R1 | R2 | R1 | R2 | R1 | R2 | R1 | R2 | R1 | R2 | Points |
| | Championship Class | | | | | | | | | | | | | | | | | | | | |
| 1 | Ben Clucas | 4 & 84 | Dallara F304 Spiess | Gawler Farm Machinery | 22 | 21 | 22 | 12 | 22 | 21 | 22 | 21 | 22 | 21 | 22 | 21 | - | - | - | - | 249 |
| 2 | Tim Macrow | 25; 60 | Dallara F301 Spiess; Dallara F304 Spiess | Tim Macrow Racing; Scud Racing | 10 | 12 | 10 | 6 | 12 | 12 | 15 | 13 | 12 | 16 | 0 | 1 | 16 | 21 | 20 | 21 | 197 |
| 3 | Michael Trimble | 10 | Dallara F304 Renault | Astuti Motorsport | 12 | 15 | 12 | 22 | 15 | 16 | 12 | 15 | 15 | 12 | 15 | 10 | 20 | 0 | - | - | 191 |
| 4 | Chris Gilmour | 60 & 17 | Dallara F304 Spiess | Gilmour Racing | 3 | 10 | 6 | 10 | 8 | 8 | 8 | 10 | 6 | 8 | 10 | 12 | 8 | 12 | 16 | 15 | 150 |
| 5 | Leanne Tander | 42 | Dallara F304 Spiess | Fleetcare TanderSport | 6 | 8 | 8 | 8 | 10 | 10 | 10 | 0 | 8 | 6 | 12 | 15 | - | - | 11 | 6 | 118 |
| 6 | Chris Alajajian | 22 | Dallara F304 Renault | Jack Hillerman | 15 | 7 | 15 | 15 | - | - | - | - | 10 | 10 | - | - | - | - | 0 | 10 | 82 |
| 7 | Stuart Kostera | 24 & 29 | Dallara F304 Renault | PHR Scuderia | - | - | - | - | - | - | - | - | 4 | 4 | 8 | 6 | 11 | 16 | 12 | 13 | 74 |
| 8 | Andy Knight | 11 | Dallara F304 Renault | Astuti Motorsport | - | - | - | - | - | - | - | - | - | - | 0 | 8 | 12 | 10 | - | - | 30 |
| 9 | Daniel Pappas | 10 | Dallara F304 Renault | Astuti Motorsport | - | - | - | - | - | - | - | - | - | - | - | - | - | - | 8 | 8 | 16 |
| 10 | Stephen Borness | 7 | Dallara F301 Fiat | Adnet Technology | 8 | 4 | 2 | 2 | - | - | - | - | - | - | - | - | - | - | - | - | 16 |
| 11 | Maher Algadri | 23 | Dallara F304 Renault | Audi Centre Melbourne | - | - | - | - | - | - | - | - | 3 | 0 | - | - | - | - | 6 | 6 | 15 |
| 12 | Jason Vince | 3 | Dallara F304 Spiess | Kings Transport | 4 | 3 | 4 | 4 | - | - | - | - | - | - | - | - | - | - | - | - | 15 |
| 13 | Laurent LePage | 3 | Dallara F304 Spiess | Kings Transport | - | - | - | - | - | - | 6 | 8 | - | - | - | - | - | - | - | - | 14 |
| 14 | Matt Sofi | 2 | Dallara F301 Fiat | Transwest Insurance Brokers | - | - | - | - | - | - | - | - | - | - | 6 | 0 | 6 | 0 | - | - | 12 |
| 15 | David Borg | 24 | Dallara F304 Renault | Insight F3 | - | - | 3 | 3 | - | - | - | - | - | - | - | - | - | - | - | - | 6 |
| | National Class | | | | | | | | | | | | | | | | | | | | |
| 1 | Ricky Occhipinti | 32 | Dallara F301 Spiess | Formula Uno Racing | 20 | 16 | 22 | 2 | 21 | 22 | 16 | 20 | 1 | 17 | 22 | 22 | - | - | - | - | 201 |
| 2 | Tim Berryman | 33 | Dallara F301 Spiess | Berryman Racing | 17 | 21 | - | - | - | - | 12 | 15 | 21 | 20 | 0 | 15 | - | - | 22 | 22 | 165 |
| 3 | Chris Barry | 6 | Dallara F301 Spiess | PRB Australia | 12 | 12 | - | - | 15 | 0 | - | - | 15 | 12 | - | - | 1 | 0 | 15 | 15 | 97 |
| 4 | John Boothman | 12 | Dallara F301 Fiat | John Boothman | - | - | - | - | - | - | - | - | - | - | 15 | 12 | - | - | 12 | 12 | 51 |
| 5 | Stuart Kostera | 70 | Dallara F301 Mugen | PHR Scuderia | - | - | - | - | - | - | 21 | 14 | - | - | - | - | - | - | - | - | 35 |
| 6 | Maher Algadri | 70 | Dallara F301 Mugen | PHR Scuderia | - | - | 15 | 20 | - | - | - | - | - | - | - | - | - | - | - | - | 35 |
| | Trophy Class | | | | | | | | | | | | | | | | | | | | |
| 1 | Graeme Holmes | 21 | Dallara F398 Toyota | Decentralised Demountables | - | - | - | - | 22 | 22 | 22 | 1 | 22 | 22 | 22 | 22 | - | - | 22 | 22 | 199 |
| 2 | Lauren Gray | 87 | Dallara F396 Toyota | Softelm Pty Ltd | 22 | 22 | 12 | 12 | 10 | 8 | 10 | 15 | 12 | 15 | 12 | 12 | 1 | 1 | 15 | 15 | 194 |
| 3 | Bill Maddocks | 88 | Dallara F396 Toyota | Softelm Pty Ltd | - | - | 16 | 15 | 12 | 10 | 12 | 20 | 15 | 12 | 15 | 15 | 1 | 0 | 10 | 12 | 165 |
| 4 | Rod Anderson | 37 | Dallara F396 Toyota | Hack, Anderson & Thomas | - | - | 21 | 22 | 15 | 12 | 15 | 13 | - | - | 0 | 10 | - | - | 12 | 10 | 130 |
| 5 | Ian Haines | 68 | Dallara F398 Toyota | Ian Haines | - | - | - | - | - | - | - | - | - | - | - | - | 20 | 21 | - | - | 41 |
| 6 | Brian Sampson | 78 | Dallara F396 Toyota | Speco VHT | - | - | - | - | 0 | 15 | - | - | - | - | - | - | - | - | - | - | 15 |
