= 2004 Australian Production Car Championship =

Motor racing championship

The 2004 Australian Production Car Championship was a CAMS sanctioned national motor racing title open to Group 3E Series Production Cars. The championship, which was the 11th Australian Production Car Championship, was managed by Procar Australia as part of the 2004 PROCAR Championship Series. The championship was won by Chris Alajajian driving a Subaru Liberty GT.

== Race calendar ==
The championship was contested over a seven-round series with two races per round.

Round	Circuit	State	Date
1	Adelaide Parklands Circuit	South Australia	19–20 March
2	Oran Park Grand Prix Circuit	New South Wales	18 April
3	Sandown International Motor Raceway	Victoria	16 May
4	Winton Motor Raceway	Victoria	20 June
5	Eastern Creek International Motor Raceway	New South Wales	18 July
6	Wakefield Park	New South Wales	8 August
7	Mallala Motor Sport Park	South Australia	19 September

== Classes ==
Car competed in four classes based on the performance potential of each car.

== Points system ==
Outright championship points were awarded on a 30–24–20–18–17–16–15–14–13–12–11–10–9–8–7–6–5–4–3–2–1 basis to the first 21 finishers in each class in each race. In addition, 3 outright championship points were awarded to the driver setting the fastest qualifying time in each class for race 1 at each round. Class championship points were awarded on the same basis as outright championship points.

== Championship standings ==
Position	Driver	No.	Car	Entrant	Points
1	Chris Alajajian	27	Subaru Liberty GT	Jack Hillermans Smash	419
2	Leanne Ferrier	42	Toyota Corolla Sportivo	Toyota Motor Corporation	378
3	David Russell	68 & 3	Proton Satria GTi	Proton Cars Australia	345
4	Ian Luff	54	Honda Integra Type-R	Formica	320
5	Lynne Champion	93	Ford AUIII Falcon XR6	Lynne Champion	306
6	David Ratcliffe	6	Toyota Celica SX	Ratcliffe Transport Spares	289
7	Geoff Russell	67 & 33	Proton Satria GTi	Proton Cars Australia	287
8	Scott Loadsman	1 & 62	Holden VY Commodore & Holden VX Commodore	Wakeling Holden	266
9	Colin Osborne	13	Toyota Celica SX	Osborne Motorsport	264
10	Rick Bates	22	Daihatsu Copen	Daihatsu Motor Corporation	254
11	David Ryan	30	Ford BA Falcon XR6 Turbo	Thomson Ford / GAM Electric	240
12	Adam Beechey	60	Honda Integra Type-R	Greg Crick Honda	216
13	Lauren Gray	21	Proton Satria GTi	Graham Roylett Motorsport	200
14	Steve Drake	11	Ford BA Falcon XR6 Turbo	Brigette Forestier Australia	197
15	Nick Dunkley	12	Ford BA Falcon XR6 Turbo	Dayco / Ontrack Motorsport	152
16	Martin Doxey	17	Holden Astra RSi	Binzel / Holden / Bilstein	149
17	John Houlder	2	Ford BA Falcon XR8	Budget Waterproofing	145
18	Drew Russell	28	Honda S2000	Formula Green	127
19	Steven Grocl	35	Volkswagen Beetle RS	J & F Motors	127
20	Darren Best	170	Ford Focus ST170	Darren Best	126
21	Derek Hocking	62	Holden VX Commodore SS	Paul Wakelings Holden	106
22	Rob Rubis	31	Toyota Celica SX	Osborne Motorsport	104
23	Trevor Keene	31	Toyota Celica SX	Osborne Motorsport	103
24	Allan Shephard	44	Honda Integra Type-R	Thrifty Car Rental	100
25	Leigh Mertens	71	Holden Vectra GL	C.V.G. Gas / Bilstein / HAZKEM	100
26	Dave Mertens	71	Holden Vectra GL	Martin Doxey Racing	88
27	Ben Walsh	29	Citroen Xsara Coupe VTS	Cuttaway Hill Wines / Total Oil	64
28	David Capraro	32	Alfa Romeo 156 GTA	Circle Corporation	52
29	Richard Hing	88	Mitsubishi FTO GPX	Millennium Audio Visual	52
30	Greg Smith	16	Holden VY Commodore SS	Fujitsu Air Conditioning	45
31	Peter Conroy	7	Honda Integra Type-R	Hankook Tyres / DBA	34
32	Leanne Ferrier	42	Toyota Corolla Sportivo	Rick Bates	33
33	AJ Lewis	55	Toyota Camry CSi	Cameron Competition	33
34	Stephen Lambrick	39	Proton Satria GTi	Auto Brake Service	17
35	Andrew Leithhead	156	Alfa Romeo 156 GTA	GTA Motorsport	13
Class A
1	Chris Alajajian	27	Subaru Liberty GT	Jack Hillermans Smash	419
2	Scott Loadsman	1 & 62	Holden VY Commodore SS; Holden VX Commodore SS	Wakeling Holden	266
3	David Ryan	30	Ford BA Falcon XR6 Turbo	Thomson Ford / GAM Electric	240
4	Steve Drake	11	Ford BA Falcon XR6 Turbo	Brigette Forestier Australia	197
5	Nick Dunkley	12	Ford BA Falcon XR6 Turbo	Dayco / Ontrack Motorsport	152
6	John Houlder	2	Ford BA Falcon XR8	Budget Waterproofing	145
7	Drew Russell	28	Honda S2000	Formula Green	127
8	Derek Hocking	62	Holden VX Commodore SS	Paul Wakelings Holden	106
9	David Capraro	32	Alfa Romeo 156 GTA	Circle Corporation	52
10	Greg Smith	16	Holden VY Commodore SS	Fujitsu Air Conditioning	45
11	Andrew Leithhead	156	Alfa Romeo 156 GTA	GTA Motorsport	13
Class B
1	Ian Luff	54	Honda Integra Type-R	Formica	320
2	David Ratcliff	6	Toyota Celica SX	Ratcliffe Transport Spares	289
3	Colin Osborne	13	Toyota Celica SX	Osborne Motorsport	264
4	Adam Beechey	60	Honda Integra Type-R	Greg Crick Honda	216
5	Steven Grocl	35	Volkswagen Beetle RS	J & F Motors	127
6	Rob Rubis	31	Toyota Celica SX	Osborne Motorsport	104
7	Trevor Keene	31	Toyota Celica SX	Osborne Motorsport	103
8	Allan Shephard	44	Honda Integra Type-R	Thrifty Car Rental	100
9	Richard Hing	88	Mitsubishi FTO GPX	Millennium Audio Visual	52
10	Peter Conroy	7	Honda Integra Type-R	Hankook Tyres / DBA	34
11	Leanne Ferrier	42	Toyota Corolla Sportivo	Rick Bates	33
Class C
1	Leanne Ferrier	42	Toyota Corolla Sportivo	Toyota Motor Corporation	378
2	Lynne Champion	93	Ford AUIII Falcon XR6	Lynne Champion	306
3	Darren Best	170	Ford Focus ST170	Darren Best	126
4	Ben Walsh	29	Citroen Xsara Coupe VTS	Cuttaway Hill Wines / Total Oil	64
5	AJ Lewis	55	Toyota Camry CSi	Cameron Competition	33
Class D
1	David Russell	68 & 3	Proton Satria GTi	Proton Cars Australia	345
2	Geoff Russell	67 & 33	Proton Satria GTi	Proton Cars Australia	287
3	Rick Bates	22	Daihatsu Copen	Daihatsu Motor Corporation	254
4	Lauren Gray	21	Proton Satria GTi	Graham Roylett Motorsport	200
5	Martin Doxey	17	Holden Astra RSi	Binzel / Holden / Bilstein	149
6	Leigh Mertens	71	Holden Vectra GL	C.V.G. Gas / Bilstein / HAZKEM	100
7	Dave Mertens	71	Holden Vectra GL	Martin Doxey Racing	88
8	Stephen Lambrick	39	Proton Satria GTi	Auto Brake Service	17

Note: The Toyota Corolla Sportiva was classified as a Class B car for Round 1 and as a Class C car from Round 2 onwards.
