= Leanne Ferrier =

Australian racing driver

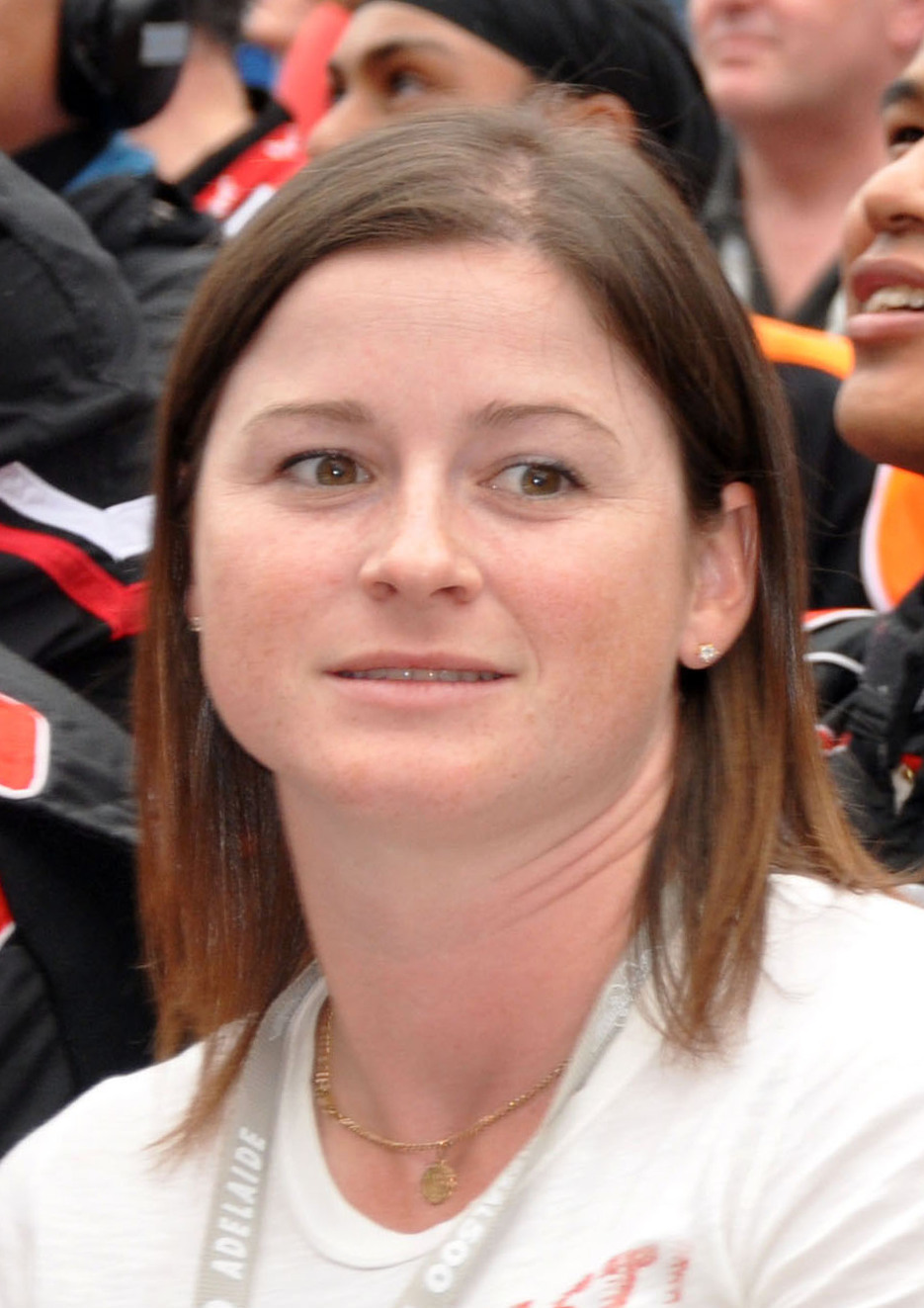
- Tander in 2010
- Nationality: (Australia) Australian
- Born: Leanne Laura Ferrier; 5 June 1980 (age 46) Sydney, New South Wales, Australia

Touring Car Masters career
- Debut season: 2010
- Car number: 11
- Starts: 20
- Championships: 0
- Wins: 1
- Best finish: 5th in 2010

Previous series
- 1998–2000 2001–02, 2009 2004 2005–2008: Australian Formula Ford; Development V8 Supercar; Australian Production Car; Australian Drivers' Champ.

Leanne Laura Ferrier (formerly Tander; born 5 June 1980 in Sydney, Australia) is an Australian race car driver having raced cars such as Formula Ford, Formula 3 and in the Supercars Championship.

== Career ==
Ferrier started in karts in 1993, and progressed to Formula Ford in 1998. After mixed success there, she moved up into Development V8 Supercars in 2001 with Garry Rogers Motorsport and 2002 with Fleetcare Racing. The next three seasons saw her race her father Mark's Mazda RX-7 in Improved Production racing, winning the Victorian and New South Wales championships in 2005, as well as driving in the Australian Production Car Championship in 2004 for Team Toyota Australia. In 2005, she had her first taste of a Formula 3 car, contesting three rounds that year, and moved to the Australian Formula Three Championship full-time in 2006, where she became the first female to win a race in 2007. After a pair of second places at Symmons Plains Raceway at the penultimate round, she went into the final round of the championship leading by four points.

After qualifying on pole position for both races at the season finale, at Oran Park Raceway, Ferrier scored a third and a second in the two races, respectively, to narrowly miss out on the championship by just two points. It remains the best ever performance by a female driver in a National Australian circuit-racing Championship, and possibly the best ever by a female driver in a National or International F3 series.

In 2008, Ferrier remained in Australian F3 scoring four poles positions, five race wins and narrowly missed out on the title at the final round to James Winslow.

In 2007, with then husband Garth leading the Supercars standings, and Leanne having led the Australian Drivers Championship during the season, it was the first time that a married couple have simultaneously led Australian Motor Racing Championships.

In the 2009 V8 Supercar Series, Ferrier joined Paul Cruikshank Racing. She also returned to the Super2 Series driving a TanderSport prepared Ford Falcon BF.

In 2010, Ferrier competed in the Touring Car Masters, driving a replica Ford Falcon XA GTHO Phase IV. She placed fifth in the series, having won the last race of Round 5, held at the Mount Panorama Circuit as a support category to the 2010 Bathurst 1000.

As of 2012, Ferrier has been a regular contributor to entertainment and lifestyle website Live4.

== Personal life ==
Ferrier married Australian racing driver Garth Tander in 2004. The couple separated in 2022. Ferrier has two children with Tander, a son, Sebastian, and a daughter, Scarlett.

== Karting results ==
=== Karting career summary ===
Season	Series	Position
1995	New South Wales Kart Championships - Junior J	1st
1996	CIK Asian-Pacific Championship - ICA	13th
1996	Queensland Karting Championship - ICA	1st
1996	Australian Karting Championship - ICA	2nd
1996	New South Wales Kart Championships - Senior J	1st

== Career results ==
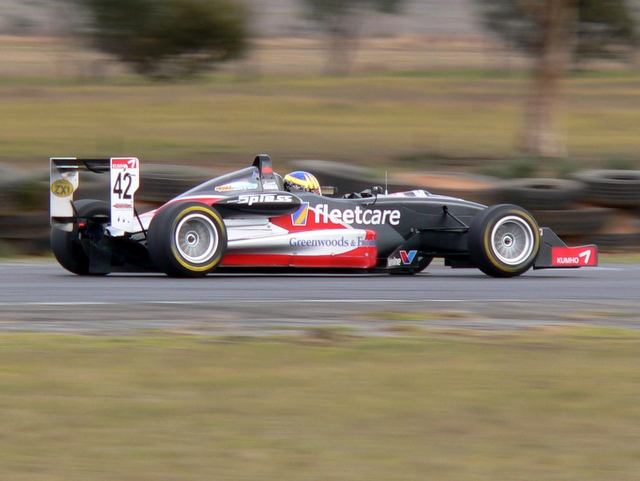
Tander placed 5th in the 2006 Australian Drivers' Championship.

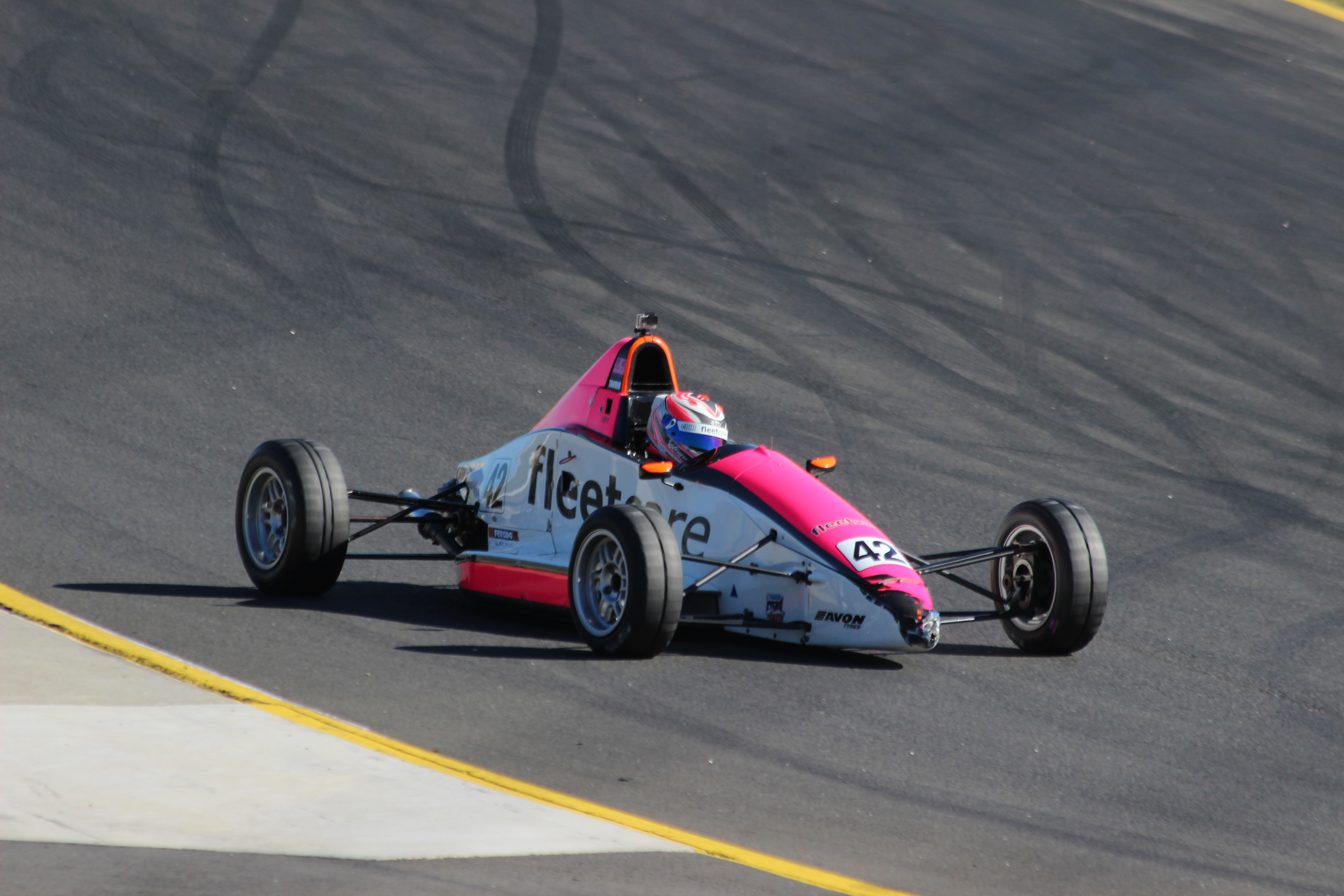
Tander (Mygale SJ10a) placed 10th in the 2015 Australian Formula Ford Series.

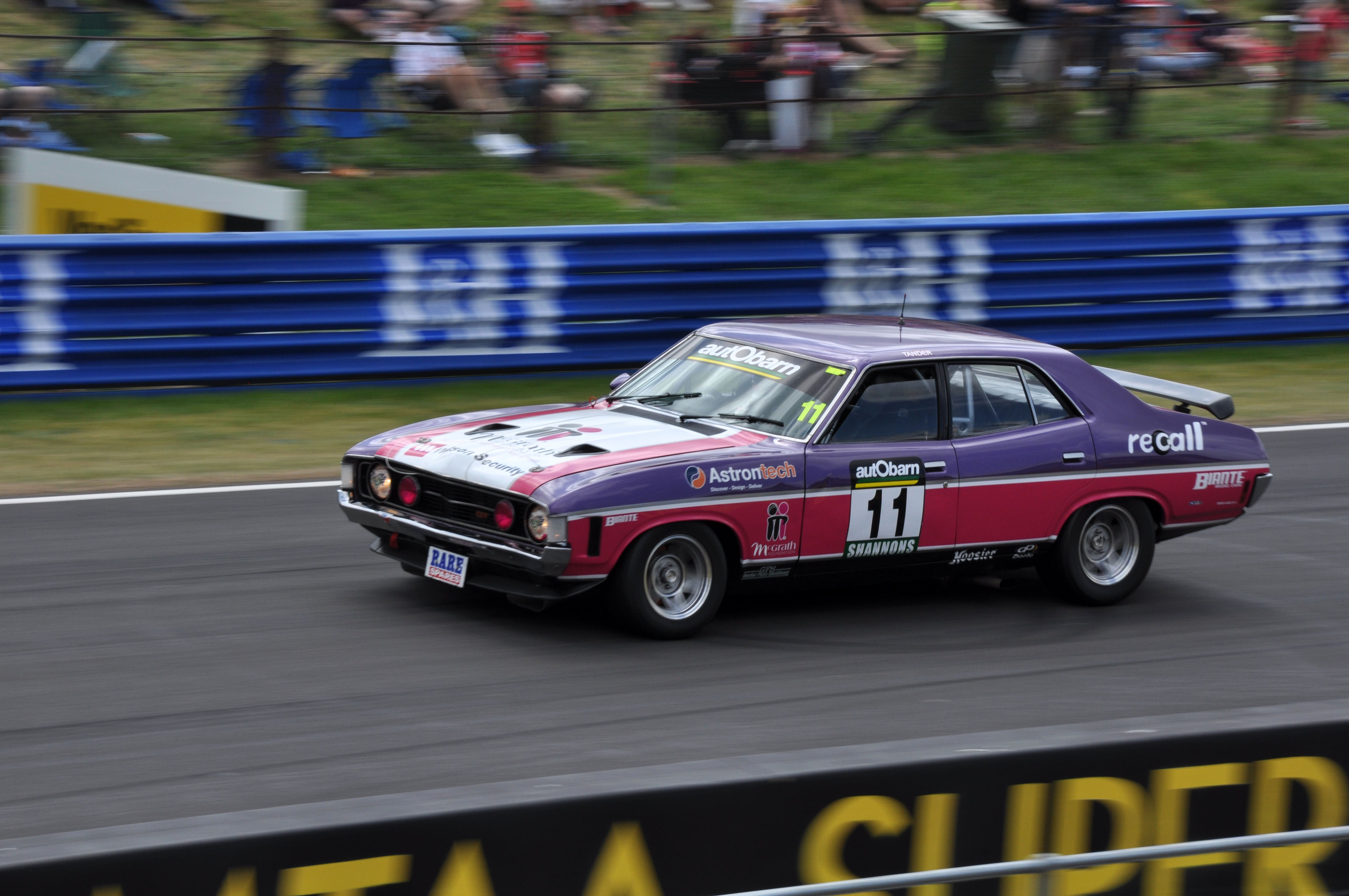
Tander placed fifth in Group 1 of the 2010 Touring Car Masters series driving a Ford XA Falcon GT.

Season	Series	Position	Car	Team
1998	Australian Formula Ford Championship	27th	Van Diemen RF94 Ford	Leanne Ferrier
1999	Australian Formula Ford Championship	7th	Stealth Van Diemen RF94 Ford	Fastlane Racing
2000	Australian Formula Ford Championship	**3rd**	Stealth Van Diemen RF94 Ford	Garry Rogers Motorsport
2001	Konica V8 Supercar Series	5th	Holden VT Commodore	Garry Rogers Motorsport
2001	Shell Championship Series	59th	Holden VT Commodore	Garry Rogers Motorsport
2002	Konica V8 Supercar Series	18th	Holden VS Commodore	Fleetcare Racing
2003	Australian Production Car Championship	22nd	Daihatsu Sirion GTVi	Daihatsu Motor Corporation
2004	Australian Production Car Championship	**3rd**	Toyota Corolla Sportivo	Neal Bates Motorsport
2004	Australian Production Car Championship Class C	**1st**	Toyota Corolla Sportivo	Neal Bates Motorsport
2005	Victorian Improved Production Car Championship	**1st**	Mazda RX-7	Mark Ferrier
2005	New South Wales Improved Production Car Championship	**1st**	Mazda RX-7	Mark Ferrier
2005	Australian Drivers' Championship	7th	Dallara F301 Alfa Romeo; Dallara F304 Spiess Opel	Piccola Scuderia; Fleetcare TanderSport
2006	Australian Drivers' Championship	5th	Dallara F304 Spiess Opel	Fleetcare TanderSport
2006–07	Toyota Racing Series	17th	Tatuus TT104ZZ Toyota	European Technique
2007	Australian Drivers' Championship	**2nd**	Dallara F304 Spiess Opel	Fleetcare TanderSport
2008	Australian Drivers' Championship	**2nd**	Dallara F307 HWA Mercedes-Benz	TanderSport
2009	Fujitsu V8 Supercar Series	19th	Ford BF Falcon	Paul Cruickshank Racing
2009	V8 Supercar Championship Series	44th	Ford BF Falcon	Paul Cruickshank Racing
2010	Touring Car Masters	5th	Ford XA Falcon GT	Phil Morris
2015	Australian Formula Ford Series	10th	Mygale SJ10a	Fleetcare TanderSport
2016	Australian Formula Ford Series	**1st**	Mygale SJ10a	Fleetcare TanderSport
2019	TCR Australia Touring Car Series	14th	Audi RS3 TCR	Melbourne Performance Centre

Note: Ferrier raced under her married name of Tander between 2005 and 2022.

=== Complete Toyota Racing Series results ===
(key) (Races in bold indicate pole position) (Races in italics indicate fastest lap)

Year	Team	1	2	3	4	5	6	7	8	9	10	11	12	13	14	15	16	17	18	19	20	DC	Points
2006-07	European Technique	PUK1; 1	PUK1; 2	PUK1; 3	RUA; 1	RUA; 2	RUA; 3	TAU; 1	TAU; 2	TAU; 3	MAN; 1 Ret	MAN; 2; 9	MAN; 3; 7	TIM; 1; 10	TIM; 2; 6	TIM; 3; 14	TER; 1; 16	TER; 2; 9	TER; 3; 10	PUK2; 1	PUK2; 2	17th	225

=== Complete New Zealand Grand Prix results ===
Year	Team	Car	Qualifying	Main race
2007	(Australia) European Technique	Tatuus TT104ZZ – Toyota	12th	10th

=== Supercars Championship results ===
Supercars results
Year	Team	Car	1	2	3	4	5	6	7	8	9	10	11	12	13	14	15	16	17	18	19	20	21	22	23	24	25	26	27	28	29	30	Pos.	Pts
2001	Garry Rogers Motorsport	Holden VT Commodore	PHI; R1	PHI; R2	ADE; R3	ADE; R4	EAS; R5	EAS; R6	HDV; R7	HDV; R8	HDV; R9	CAN; R10	CAN; R11	CAN; R12	BAR; R13	BAR; R14	BAR; R15	CAL; R16	CAL; R17	CAL; R18	ORA; R19	ORA; R20	QLD; R21; 12	WIN; R22	WIN; R23	BAT; R24; Ret	PUK; R25	PUK; R26	PUK; R27	SAN; R28	SAN; R29	SAN; R30	59th	168
2009	Paul Cruickshank Racing	Ford BF Falcon	ADE; R1	ADE; R2	HAM; R3	HAM; R4	WIN; R5	WIN; R6	SYM; R7	SYM; R8	HDV; R9	HDV; R10	TOW; R11	TOW; R12	SAN; R13	SAN; R14	QLD; R15	QLD; R16	PHI; QR; 27	PHI; R17; 19	BAT; R18; 18	SUR; R19	SUR; R20	SUR; R21	SUR; R22	PHI; R23	PHI; R24	BAR; R25	BAR; R26	SYD; R27	SYD; R28		44th	192

=== Complete Bathurst 1000 results ===
Year	Team	Car	Co-driver	Position	Laps
2001	Garry Rogers Motorsport	Holden Commodore VX	(Australia) Paul Dumbrell	DNF	41
2009	Paul Cruickshank Racing	Ford Falcon FG	(Australia) David Wall	18th	160

=== Complete Bathurst 12 Hour results ===
Year	Team	Co-drivers	Car	Class	Laps	Overall position	Class position
2009	(Australia) Peter Conroy Motorsport	(Australia) Terry Conroy (Australia) Lee Burges	Honda Integra Type S	F	226	13th	**2nd**
2010	(Australia) Peter Conroy Motorsport	(Australia) Terry Conroy (Australia) Lee Burges	Honda Integra Type S	D	188	13th	**2nd**
2017	MARC Cars Australia	(Australia) Tim Leahey (Australia) Gerard McLeod (Australia) Nick Rowe	MARC Mazda 3 V8	I	218	30th	7th

=== TCR Australia results ===
TCR Australia results
Year	Team	Car	1	2	3	4	5	6	7	8	9	10	11	12	13	14	15	16	17	18	19	20	21	Position	Points
2019	Melbourne Performance Centre	Audi RS 3 LMS TCR	SMP; R1	SMP; R2	SMP; R3	PHI; R4; 8	PHI; R5; 13	PHI; R6; 10	BEN; R7; 11	BEN; R8; 8	BEN; R9; 10	QLD; R10; 12	QLD; R11; 9	QLD; R12; 9	WIN; R13; 12	WIN; R14; 11	WIN; R15; 9	SAN; R16	SAN; R17	SAN; R18	BEN; R19	BEN; R20	BEN; R21	14th	220
