= Ben Clucas =

British racing driver

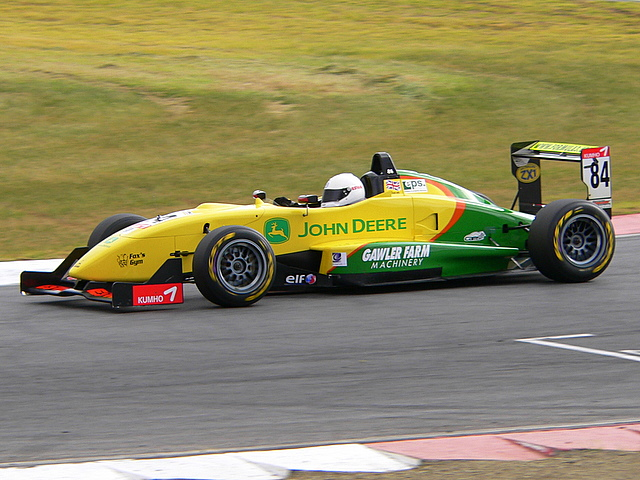
- Clucas at the Mallala round of the 2006 Australian Drivers' Championship
- Nationality: British
- Born: 28 January 1984 (age 42) Frimley, United Kingdom

Spanish GT Championship career
- Debut season: 2007
- Current team: Escuela Española de Pilotos
- Categorisation: FIA Gold (until 2014); FIA Silver (2015–)
- Starts: 24
- Wins: 9
- Poles: 4
- Fastest laps: 4
- Best finish: 1st in 2009

Previous series
- 2001-03 2004 2005-08 2007, 09-10 2019: Formula Ford; Formula Renault; Formula 3 Spanish GT; Britcar

Championship titles
- 2002 2006 2009: British Junior Formula Ford; Australian Formula 3 Spanish GT (GT Light class)

Benjamin Sean Clucas (born 28 January 1984) is a British racing driver.

Clucas was born in Frimley. He has competed in series such as the Formula 3 Euro Series, Toyota Racing Series and the British Formula 3 Championship. Clucas won the 2006 Australian Drivers' Championship for Team BRM and the GT Light class of the Spanish GT Championship in 2009 with Francisco Lorena. In 2019, Clucas competed in the Dunlop Endurance Championship in a Porsche 997 Cup.

== Career results ==
=== Karting career summary ===
Season	Series	Position
1999	Super 1 National Championship - TKM Junior	**1st**
1999	ABxC 'O'Plate - TKM Junior	**1st**
2000	Super 1 National Championship - TKM Junior	**2nd**
2022	National Karting Cup - 100UK	**2nd**

=== Circuit career ===
Season	Series	Position	Car	Team
2001	British Formula Ford - Junior Cup	5th	Van Diemen RF00	Martin Donnelly Racing
2001	British Formula Ford Winter Series	4th	Van Diemen RF00	Martin Donnelly Racing
2002	Avon Tyres Formula Ford - Junior Cup	**1st**	Mygale SJ01	
2002	Formula Ford Festival	5th	Mygale SJ01	
2002	British Formula Renault Winter Series	**3rd**	Tatuus	
2003	British Formula Ford Championship	7th	Mygale SJ2003	Jamun Racing Services
2003	Formula Ford Festival	6th	Mygale SJ2003	Jamun Racing Services
2004	Formula Renault 2000 Italia	5th	Tatuus	Prema Powerteam
2004	Formula Renault 2000 Germany season	33rd	Tatuus	Prema Powerteam
2004	Formula Renault 2000 Netherlands season	27th	Tatuus	Prema Powerteam
2005	British Formula 3 - National Class	7th	Lola Dome F106-4 (Mugen Honda)	Fluid Motorsport
2006	Australian Drivers' Championship	**1st**	Dallara F304 (Renault)	Team BRM
2006	Australian Formula 3 Championship	**1st**	Dallara F304 (Renault)	Team BRM
2006-07	Toyota Racing Series	**9th**	Tatuus TT104ZZ	ESWA Racing
2007	Spanish GT Championship - GTB	**2nd**	Porsche 911 GT3 Cup 997	Escuela Española de Pilotos
2007	Japanese Formula 3 Championship	13th	Dallara F307 (Nissan Tomei)	ThreeBond Racing
2008	Australian Drivers' Championship	10th	Dallara F307 (Mercedes)	Team BRM
2008	Australian Formula 3 Championship	10th	Dallara F307 (Mercedes)	Team BRM
2009	Spanish GT Championship - GT Light	**1st**	Ginetta G50	Escuela Española de Pilotos
2010	Spanish GT Championship - GT Light	4th	Ginetta G50	Escuela Española de Pilotos
2011	V de V Challenege GT/Tourisme - GTV5	**2nd**	Ginetta G50	Escuela Española de Pilotos
2015	Pirelli World Challenge - GTS	7th	Kia Optima	Kinetic Motorsports
2018	24H GT Series - GT4	**2nd**	Audi R8 LMS GT4	Fox Motorsport

=== Complete Pirelli World Challenge results ===
(key) (Races in bold indicate pole position) (Races in italics indicate fastest lap)

Year	Team	Car	1	2	3	4	5	6	7	8	9	10	11	12	13	14	15	16	17	Position	Points
2015	Kinetic Motorsports	Kia Optima	AUS; 5	AUS; 2	STP; 6	STP; 6	BAR; 8	BAR; 3	MOS; 7	MOS; 8	ELK; 15	ELK; 2	MOH; 9	MOH; 9	MIL; 4	MIL; 3	SON; 9	SON; 22	LAG; 4	7th	1206

=== 24 Hours of Silverstone results ===
Year	Team	Co-drivers	Car	Car No.	Class	Laps	Pos.	Class pos.
2010	(United Kingdom) Topcats Racing/Runnymede	(United Kingdom) Andrew Beaumont (United Kingdom) Henry Fletcher (United Kingdom) Pat Gormley	Mosler MT900R	1	1	547	4th	**2nd**

=== 24 Hours of Dubai results ===
Year	Team	Co-drivers	Car	Class	Pos.	Class pos.
2019	(United Kingdom) Fox Motorsport	(United Kingdom) Jamie Stanley (United Kingdom) Glenn Sherwood (United Kingdom) Andrew Perry	Audi R8 LMS GT4	GT4	6th	6th

Sporting positions
Preceded by Aaron Caratti	Winner of the Australian Drivers' Championship; 2006	Succeeded by Tim Macrow
