= Rod Anderson =

Australian racing driver

- Nationality: Australian

Australian Formula 3 - Trophy Class
- Years active: 2001–09
- Teams: Hack Anderson Thomas
- Starts: 80
- Wins: 14
- Best finish: 1st in 2007 (Trophy Class)

Championship titles
- 1999 2007: Australian Formula 2 Australia Formula 3 - Trophy Class

Rod Anderson is a race car driver born in Australia. His racing career started in the 1980s driving historic cars, before he moved on to driving Australian sports cars from 1989 until 1996. He won the Australian Formula Two national series in 1999. After a hiatus, he returned to racing in Australian Formula Three's C-Class in 2001, moving up to the B-Class in 2002 and staying there until the present. During his time in Australian F3, he has driven for his own Anderson team. In 2007, he won the Trophy Class of the 2007 Formula 3 title.
