= Team BRM =

Australian motorsport team

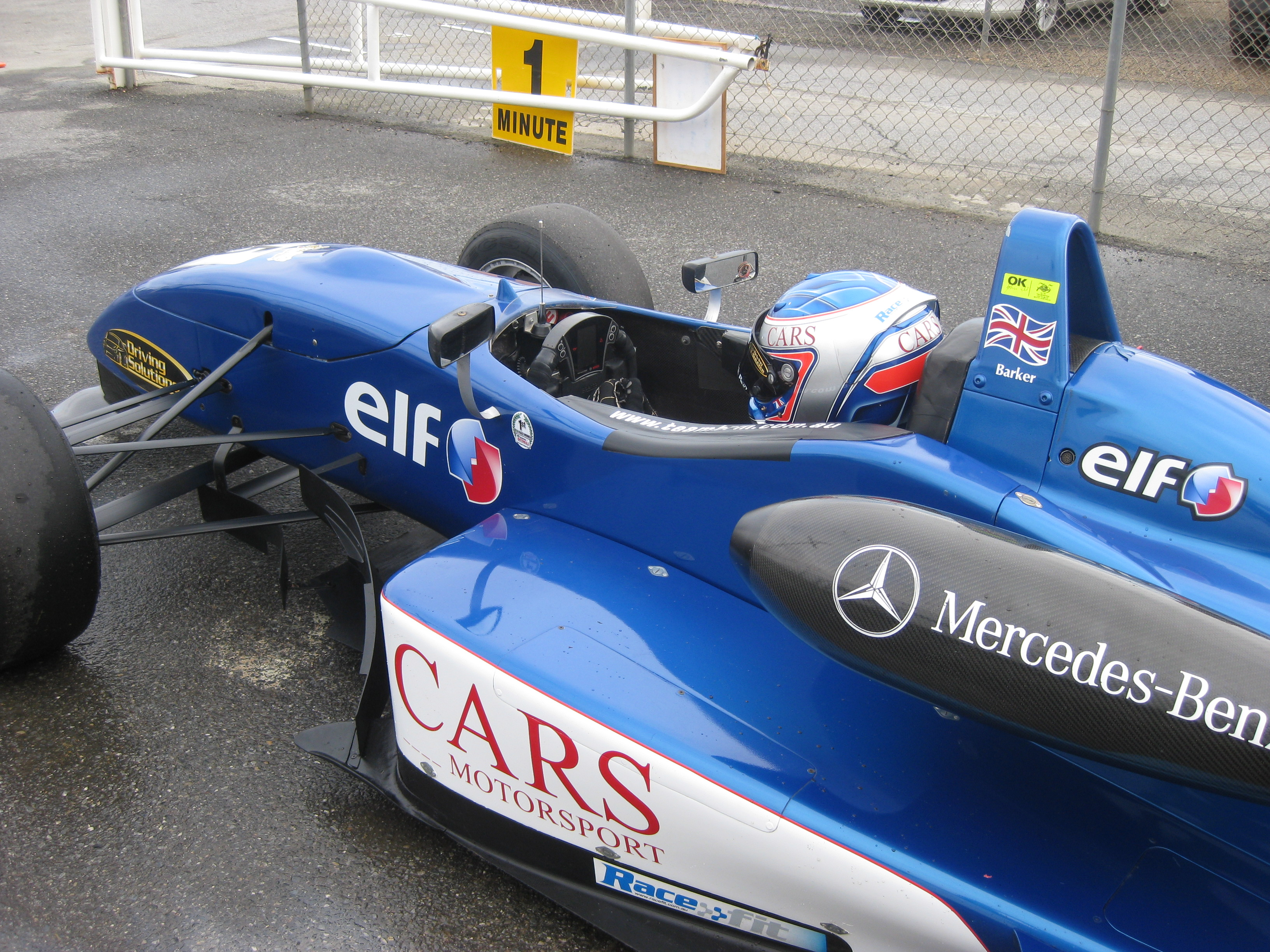
Ben Barker won the 2010 Australian Drivers' Championship driving for Team BRM

Team BRM, formerly known as Bronte Rundle Motorsport, is an open-wheel motor racing team in Australia. The team have competed in Australian Formula 3 for over a decade, winning several titles, including the Australian Drivers' Championship. The team has expanded into the Australian Formula Ford Championship in recent years, and in 2011 added the Australian Carrera Cup Championship to their capabilities.

Based in Adelaide, South Australia, the team was created initially to run Bronte Rundle's racing career as he raced in Australian Formula 2 racing in the late 1980s. One of the original supporters of Formula 3 when it arrived in Australia in the late 1990s, the team become one of the foundation teams of the Australian Formula 3 Championship. Gradually becoming a professional modern open wheel racing team, the team have become the most successful team in modern Australian Formula 3 history. Team BRM drivers have won the AF3 title seven times, in 2002 with James Manderson; 2004 with Karl Reindler; 2006 with Ben Clucas, 2008 with James Winslow, 2009 with Joey Foster, 2010 with Ben Barker and 2013 with Tim Macrow.

== Cars ==
The team runs a fleet of Dallara and Mygale Formula 3 cars and Porsche 911 GT3 Cup Carrera Cup Cars, as well as offering itself as a tuning and maintenance operation for other vehicles, including historic Formula One cars. Team BRM run 2 cars in the S5000 Australian Drivers' Championship.

== History ==
=== 2013 ===
In 2013 the team ran Tim Macrow, John Magro, Nick Foster and Jordan Oon's season campaign as well as guest appearances for James Winslow and Simon Hodge as well as running Nick Percat, Karl Reindler and Duvashen Padayachee in Carrera Cup. Macrow, Magro and Foster finished 1-2-3, believed to be only the second time in Australian championship history and Percat was runner up in the Carrera Cup, a best ever season finish in the Porsche series.

=== 2014 ===
In 2014 the team ran three Formula 3 cars for John Magro, Simon Hodge and Chris Anthony as well as two Porsche 991 GT3 Cup cars for Sam Power and Duvashen Padayachee.
