= Sodemo Moteurs =

Sodemo Moteurs is a motor vehicle engine tuning company based in Magny-Cours, near Nevers, France, owned by Guillaume Maillard.

Formed in 1981, and based within the ground of the Circuit de Nevers Magny-Cours, Sodemo is most associated with the tuning of Renault engines for performance and motor racing purposes. Sodemo Moteurs is perhaps best known for its preparation of two litre racing engine for Formula 3.

The firm has also been associated with the engine tuning of Alfa Romeo and Mercedes touring car engines and Range Rover rally raid engines and has worked with WilliamsF1 to win the British Touring Car Championship with Renault Laguna touring cars. Pescarolo Sport has also used Sodemo in preparation of its 24 Hours of Le Mans sportscars.

The company also designed a series of liquid-cooled V2 aircraft engines.

In 2018, Sodemo merged with Onroak Automotive, Oak Racing and Tork Engineering to form Ligier Automotve.

== Engines ==
- Sodemo V2-1.0
- Sodemo V2-1.2
