= 2013 V8 Supercar season =

Seasons
- ← 2012 2014 →

The 2013 V8 Supercar season was the seventeenth year in which V8 Supercars contested the senior Australian touring car series. It was the 54th year of touring car racing in Australia since the first runnings of the Australian Touring Car Championship, now known as the International V8 Supercars Championship, and the fore-runner of the present day Bathurst 1000, the Armstrong 500.

The season began on 1 March at the Adelaide Street Circuit and finished on 8 December at the Homebush Street Circuit. 2013 featured the seventeenth V8 Supercar Championship, consisting of 36 races at 14 events covering all six states and the Northern Territory of Australia as well as events in New Zealand and for the first time, the United States of America. There was also a stand-alone event supporting the 2013 Australian Grand Prix. The season also featured the fourteenth second-tier Dunlop V8 Supercar Series, contested over seven rounds. For the sixth time a third-tier series was run, the Kumho Tyres V8 Touring Car Series.

== Race calendar ==
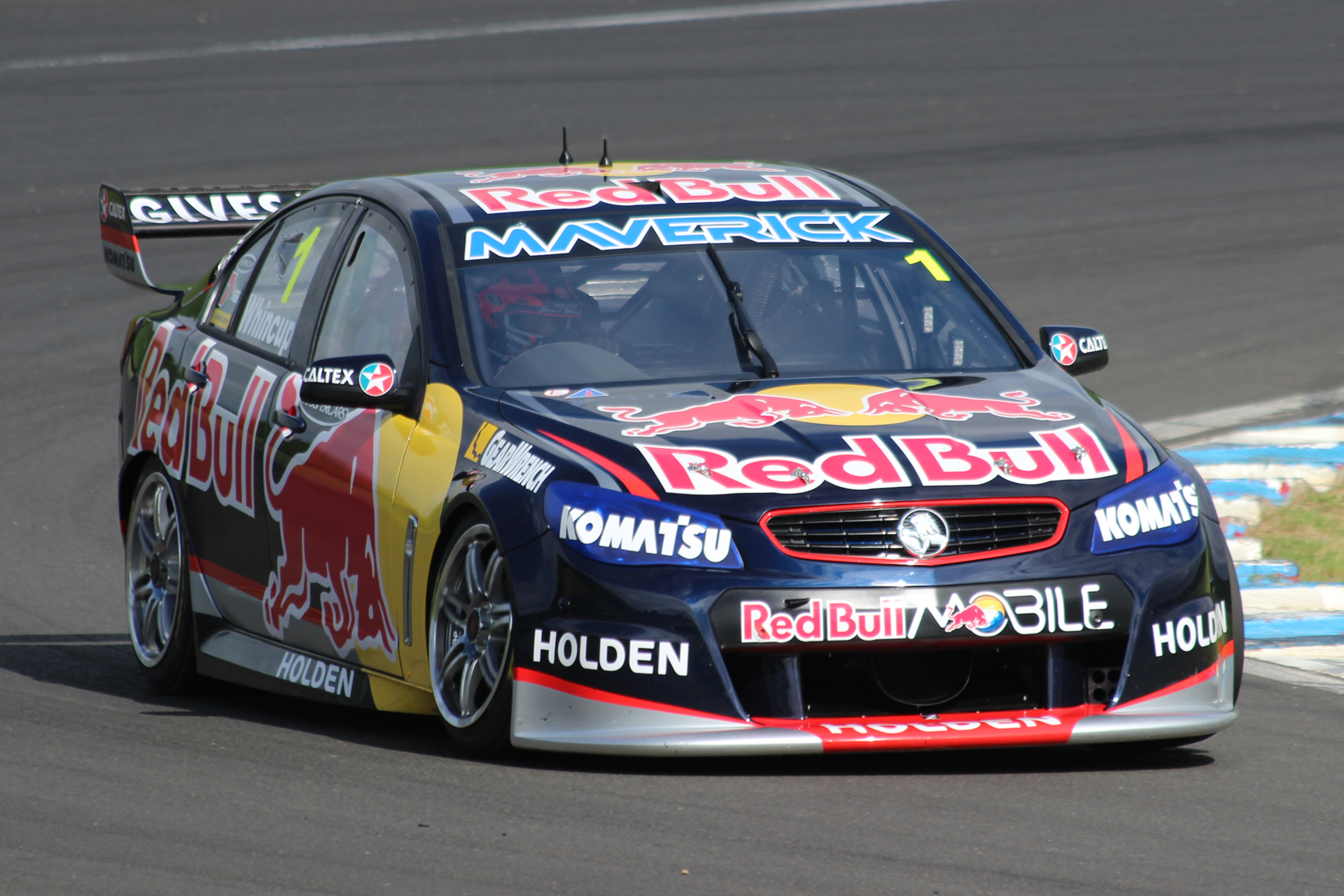
Jamie Whincup won the 2013 International V8 Supercars Championship.

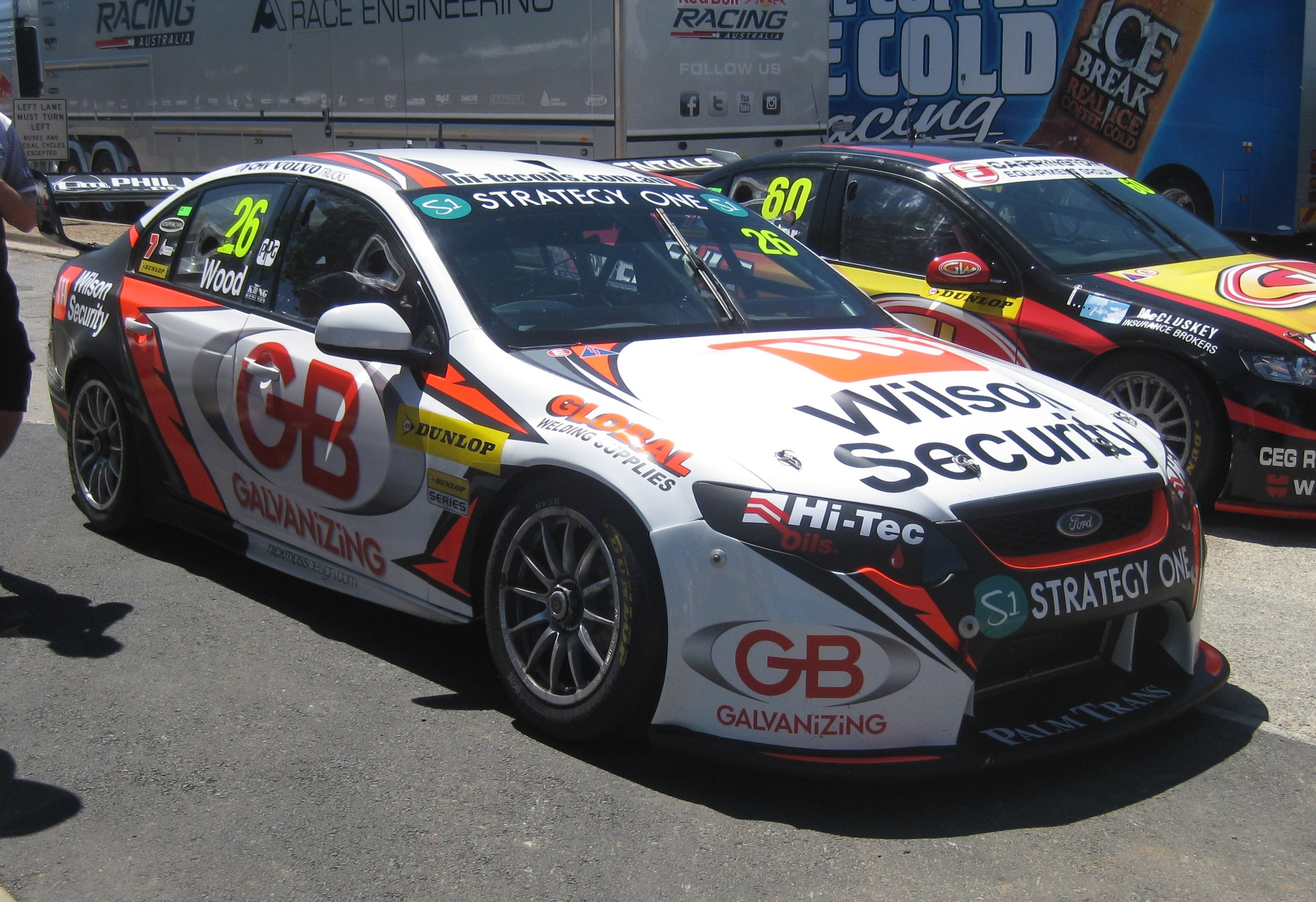
Dale Wood won the 2013 Dunlop V8 Supercar Series.

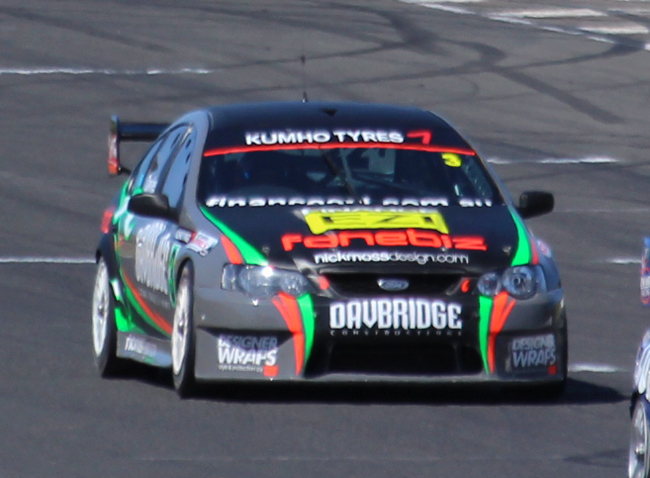
Shae Davies won the 2013 Kumho V8 Touring Car Series.

Dates sourced from:

Event title	Circuit	City / state	Race/round	Date	Winner	Report
(South Australia) Clipsal 500	Adelaide Street Circuit	Adelaide, South Australia	IVC 1 IVC 2	1–3 March	Craig Lowndes; Shane van Gisbergen	report
(South Australia) Clipsal 500	Adelaide Street Circuit	Adelaide, South Australia	DVS 1	1–3 March	Chaz Mostert	
(Victoria (state)) MSS Security V8 Supercars Challenge	Albert Park Street Circuit	Melbourne, Victoria	IVC NC	14–17 March	Fabian Coulthard	report
(New South Wales) Sydney Motorsport Park	Sydney Motorsport Park	Sydney, New South Wales	KVTC 1	22–24 March	Justin Garioch	
Tasmania Microsoft Office 365	Symmons Plains Raceway	Launceston, Tasmania	IVC 3 IVC 4 IVC 5	6–7 April	Fabian Coulthard; Jason Bright; Fabian Coulthard	report
(New Zealand) ITM 400 Auckland	Pukekohe Park Raceway	Pukekohe, New Zealand	IVC 6 IVC 7 IVC 8 IVC 9	13–14 April	Scott McLaughlin; Jamie Whincup; Will Davison; Jason Bright	report
(South Australia) Mallala	Mallala Motorsport Park	Mallala, South Australia	KVTC 2	19–21 April	Terry Wyhoon	
(Western Australia) Perth 360	Barbagallo Raceway	Perth, Western Australia	IVC 10; IVC 11; IVC 12	3–5 May	Craig Lowndes; Jamie Whincup; Jamie Whincup	report
(Western Australia) Perth 360	Barbagallo Raceway	Perth, Western Australia	DVS 2	3–5 May	Ashley Walsh	
(United States) Austin 400	Circuit of the Americas	Austin, Texas, United States of America	IVC 13; IVC 14; IVC 15; IVC 16	17–19 May	Jamie Whincup; Jamie Whincup; Fabian Coulthard; Jamie Whincup	report
(Northern Territory) Skycity Triple Crown	Hidden Valley Raceway	Darwin, Northern Territory	IVC 17; IVC 18; IVC 19	14–16 June	Jamie Whincup; Mark Winterbottom; Craig Lowndes	report
(Victoria (state)) Winton	Winton Motor Raceway	Benalla, Victoria	KVTC 3	21–23 June	Tony Evangelou	
(Queensland) Sucrogen Townsville 400	Townsville Street Circuit	Townsville, Queensland	IVC 20; IVC 21	5–7 July	Will Davison; Garth Tander	report
(Queensland) Sucrogen Townsville 400	Townsville Street Circuit	Townsville, Queensland	DVS 3	5–7 July	Steve Owen	
(Queensland) Coates Hire Ipswich 360	Queensland Raceway	Ipswich, Queensland	IVC 22; IVC 23; IVC 24	26–28 July	Jamie Whincup; Scott McLaughlin; Chaz Mostert	report
(Queensland) Coates Hire Ipswich 360	Queensland Raceway	Ipswich, Queensland	DVS 4	26–28 July	Jack Perkins	
Queensland Raceway	Queensland Raceway	Ipswich, Queensland	KVTC 4	2–4 August	Ryan Simpson	
(Victoria (state)) Winton 360	Winton Motor Raceway	Benalla, Victoria	IVC 25; IVC 26; IVC 27	23–25 August	James Moffat; Mark Winterbottom; James Courtney	report
(Victoria (state)) Winton 360	Winton Motor Raceway	Benalla, Victoria	DVS 5	23–25 August	Dale Wood	
(Victoria (state)) Wilson Security Sandown 500	Sandown Raceway	Melbourne, Victoria	IVC 28	13–15 September	Jamie Whincup; Paul Dumbrell	report
(Victoria (state)) Phillip Island	Phillip Island Grand Prix Circuit	Phillip Island, Victoria	KVTC 5	20–22 September	Ryan Simpson	
(New South Wales) Supercheap Auto Bathurst 1000	Mount Panorama Circuit	Bathurst, New South Wales	IVC 29	10–13 October	Mark Winterbottom; Steven Richards	report
(New South Wales) Supercheap Auto Bathurst 1000	Mount Panorama Circuit	Bathurst, New South Wales	DVS 6	10–13 October	Steve Owen	
(Queensland) Armor All Gold Coast 600	Surfers Paradise Street Circuit	Surfers Paradise, Queensland	IVC 30 IVC 31	25–27 October	Craig Lowndes; Warren Luff; David Reynolds; Dean Canto	report
(Victoria (state)) Sandown	Sandown Raceway	Melbourne, Victoria	KVTC 6	15–17 November	Ryan Simpson	
(Victoria (state)) Sargent Security Phillip Island 360	Phillip Island Grand Prix Circuit	Phillip Island, Victoria	IVC 32; IVC 33; IVC 34	22–24 November	Garth Tander; Craig Lowndes; Jamie Whincup	report
(New South Wales) Sydney Telstra 500	Homebush Street Circuit	Sydney, New South Wales	IVC 35; IVC 36	6–8 December	Jamie Whincup; Shane van Gisbergen	report
(New South Wales) Sydney Telstra 500	Homebush Street Circuit	Sydney, New South Wales	DVS 7	6–8 December	Steve Owen	

- IVC – International V8 Supercar Championship
- DVS – Dunlop V8 Supercar Series
- KVTC – Kumho Tyres V8 Touring Car Series
- NC – Non-championship
