= Marc Lieb =

German racing driver (born 1980)

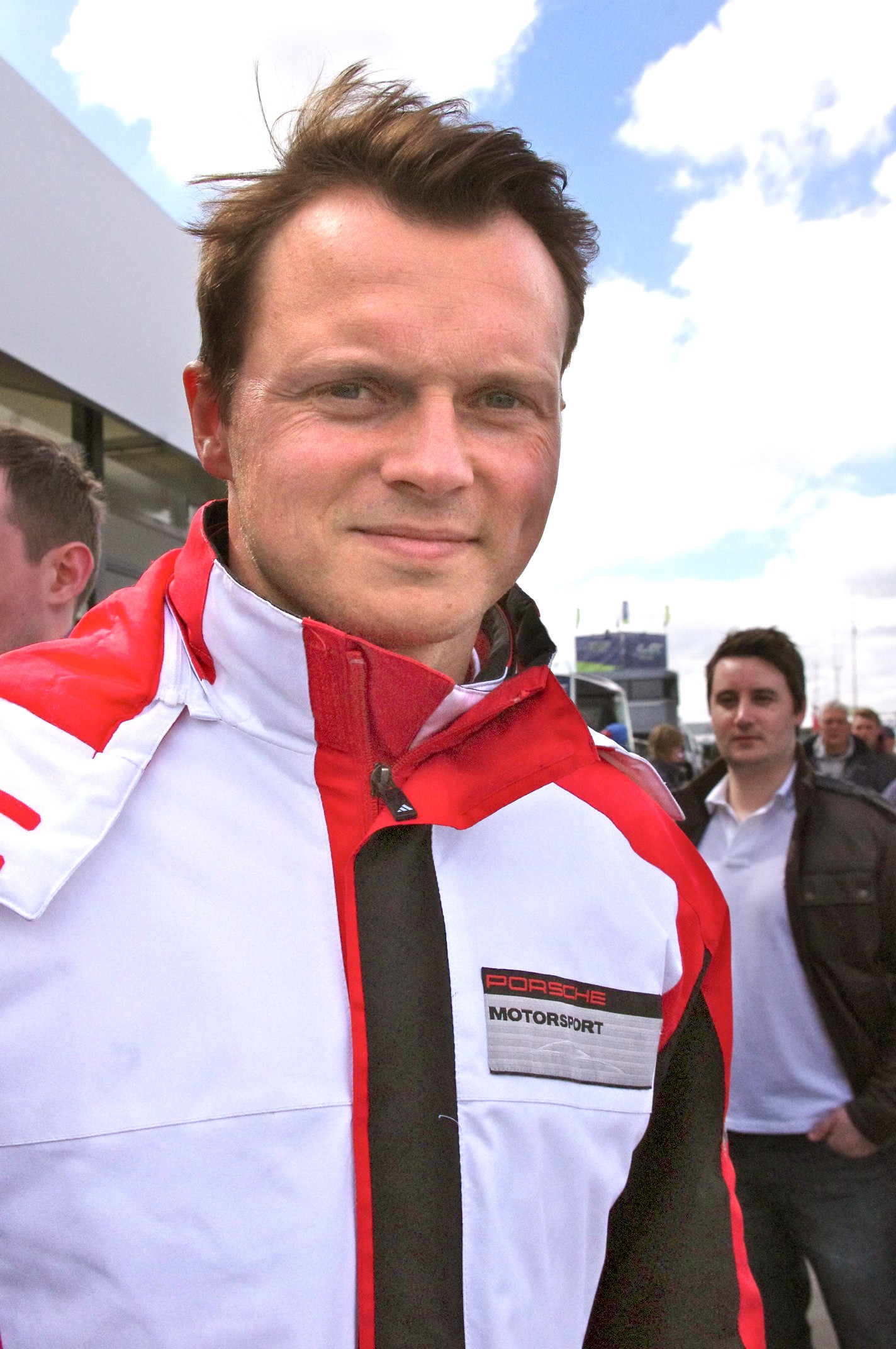
- Lieb at the Silverstone Round of the 2014 FIA World Endurance Championship
- Nationality: (Germany) German
- Born: 4 July 1980 (age 46) Stuttgart, West Germany
- Categorisation: FIA Platinum

24 Hours of Le Mans career
- Years: 2003–2005, 2009–2016
- Teams: Orbit Racing, Alex Job Racing, Team Felbermayr-Proton, Porsche AG Team Manthey
- Best finish: 1st (2016)
- Class wins: 4 (2005, 2010, 2013, 2016)

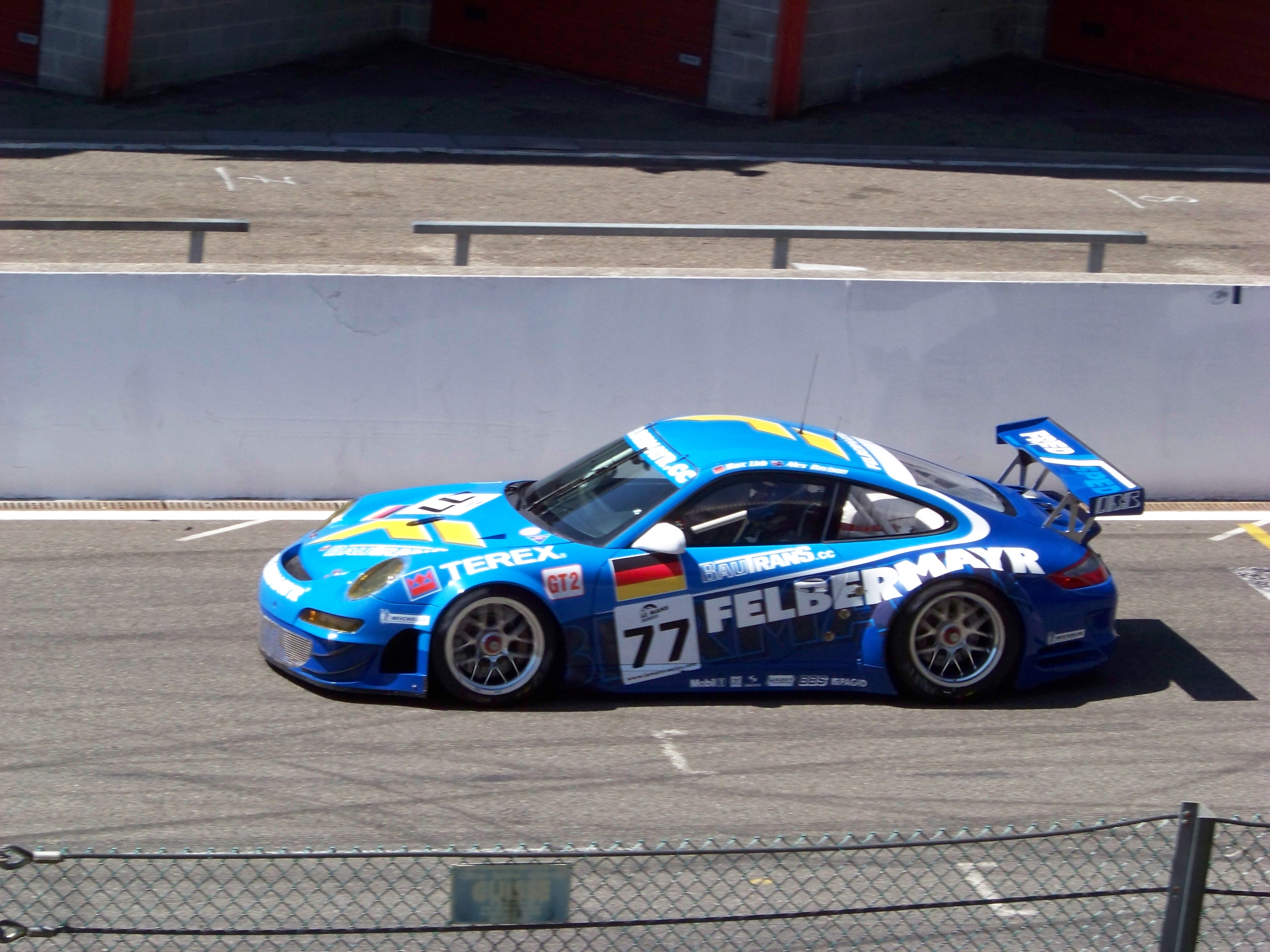
Lieb in a Felbermayr-Proton Porsche 2008

Marc Lieb (born 4 July 1980) is a German former Porsche factory motor racing driver. He won the FIA GT Championship in 2003 and 2005, and the European Le Mans Series in 2005, 2006, 2009 and 2010. He won the 24 Hours Nürburgring four times, and won the 24 Hours of Le Mans in 2016, the 2008 12 Hours of Sebring, the 2003 Spa 24 Hours and the 2007 Petit Le Mans. He is also the 2016 FIA World Endurance Champion.

== Career ==
Born in Stuttgart, Lieb started racing in karts in 1992. In 1995, he moved to cars, racing in the German Formula Renault 1800 championship. He finished second in the championship the next year. In 1998, he moved to German Formula Renault 2000. In 1999, he finished third in the Formula Renault Eurocup. In 2000, Lieb became a Porsche Junior driver, and raced in the Porsche Carrera Cup, finishing fifth in the championship. In 2001, he finished seventh in Carrera Cup, and also scored a podium in Porsche Supercup.

In 2002, Lieb won the Carrera Cup championship with 4 wins. He also took two N-GT wins in the FIA GT Championship, at Brno and Enna-Pergusa. He raced at the 12 Hours of Sebring and Petit Le Mans as well, but failed to finish either race. For 2003, Lieb became a full Porsche factory driver, and raced in FIA GT. He won the N-GT championship, driving with Stéphane Ortelli for Freisinger Motorsport. Along the way, he won three races, including winning the Spa 24 Hours outright in his Porsche 911 GT3-RS. He also finished second in the GT class at the 24 Hours of Le Mans. Marc Lieb won the Porsche Cup, an annual award presented by Porsche AG to recognize the world's most successful privateer racing driver competing with Porsche machinery in a customer racing team, in 2003.

In 2004, Lieb raced in the American Le Mans Series with Romain Dumas for Alex Job Racing. Lieb started the season finishing second in class at Sebring, and finished fourth in the championship after taking wins at Portland and Laguna Seca.

After the 2004 season, Lieb commenced studies in engineering at the University of Applied Sciences in Esslingen, combining his education with a reduced factory programme with Porsche. Lieb had previously studied automotive and motor engineering at the University of Stuttgart for two semesters before choosing to focus on racing. Lieb completed his degree at Esslingen after seven semesters of study and has subsequently combined his racing with a role as an engineer at Porsche Motorsport's workshop in Weissach.

In 2005, Lieb returned to the FIA GT Championship where he won the GT2 Drivers title with Mike Rockenfeller for GruppeM Racing, netting a class win at the Spa 24 Hours along the way. He also raced in the Le Mans Endurance Series, winning three of four races and the championship with Sebah Automotive. Lieb also won the GT2 class at the 24 Hours of Le Mans with Mike Rockenfeller and Leo Hindrey. In 2006, he won the Le Mans Series GT2 championship with Joël Camathias, driving for Autorlando Sport.

In 2007 and 2008, Lieb drive for Team Felbermayr-Proton in the Le Mans Series with a Porsche 911 GT3-RSR (2008).

In 2009, Lieb teaming up with Richard Lietz in the Porsche 911 of Felbermayr Proton in the European Le Mans Series. He won the GT2 class championship with three wins in five rounds. On his return to the 24 Hours of Le Mans, who ran for Felbermayr-Proton alongside Lietz and Henzler, had to retire. He also disputed the round of Zolder for the FIA GT Championship for Prospeed, which finished eighth with Darryl O'Young. Instead, he earned his third victory in the 24 Hours Nürburgring for Manthey. In the American Le Mans Series, was fourth in Sebring and 5th Petit Le Mans as third driver of Bergmeister and Patrick Long Flying Lizard, and came second at the time of Miller with Henzler for Farnbacher-Loles' team, always in a Porsche 911 GT2 class.

Lieb and Lietz successfully defended the drivers and teams titles of GT2 class in the 2010 Le Mans Series, with three wins against two semiofficials' Ferrari F430 of AF Corse. Also, he earned his second victory in the GT2 class at the 24 Hours of Le Mans, once again alongside Lietz and Henzler in the Porsche 911 Felbermayr-Proton. Lieb returned with Bergmeister and Long for Flying Lizard in the two main races of the American Le Mans Series: Sebring finished fourth and fifth at Petit Le Mans. Returned to the 24 Hours of Spa as Prospeed driver, accompanying Marc Goossens, Marco Holzer and Westbrook in a Porsche 911 GT2 class, in this occasion the principal during the race, but abandoned.

Lieb continued contesting the European Le Mans Series in 2011 for the Felbermayr-Proton team. He and Lietz managed two podiums but neither wins in five rounds, so that finished fifth in the drivers' championship and third in the teams championship of the renowned GTE-Pro category. Counting with Henzler as third driver for the fourth consecutive year, finished fourth in the GTE-Pro class at the 24 Hours of Le Mans. In their participation in the 12 Hours of Sebring for Flying Lizard, again accompanying a Bergmeister and Long, finished in sixth position. No raced Petit Le Mans, although in the 24 Hours of Daytona, where he finished sixth in the GT class in a Brumos' Porsche 911. He also returned to win the 24 Hours of Nürburgring for Manthey, forming crew Bernhard, Dumas and Luhr. He also returned to pair with Alex Davison, but this time at the invitation of V8 Supercars to drive a Ford Falcon in Surfers Paradise Grand Prix, he finished 23rd and 18th in each race.

In 2012, Felbermayr-Proton left the European Le Mans Series for the World Endurance Championship. Lieb continued teaming up with Lietz in the team. He earned two wins and six podiums in eight races, whereby Felbermayr-Proton finished third in the teams championship and Porsche concluded second in the manufacturers championship. Also finished third in the 24 Hours of Daytona, again in the Brumos' Porsche 911. On the other hand, returned to Surfers Paradise but this time he drove a Holden Commodore, finishing second in the first round and 14th in the second.

Porsche officially entered in the 2013 World Endurance Championship, Lieb and hired to drive one of the new Porsche 911 of Manthey alongside Lietz. Both, along with Dumas, won the 24 Hours of Le Mans, and captured five fourth-place finishes, one fifth-place finish as well as one sixth-place finish, counting as third driver a Dumas in the first three rounds. Thus, was fifth in the Drivers' Championship, and third in the teams and makes. Also came second overall in the 24 Hours of Spa, and finishing seventh overall in the 24 Hours of Nürburgring and first in the SP7 class, also with Manthey. On the other hand, ran in the 24 Hours of Daytona with Brumos' Porsche 911, and the three rounds of minimatch resistance of V8 Supercars Holden Commodore with Jonathon Webb.

Porsche then announced after the conclusion of the 2013 season that Lieb would be joining the Porsche 919 Hybrid LMP1 program for the 2014 WEC.

On 4 September 2013, Lieb set a lap time of 6:57 in Porsche's 918 Spyder around the Nürburgring Nordschleife. This was at the time the third fastest official lap time from a street legal vehicle to go round the Ring.

Lieb won the 2016 24 Hours of Le Mans overall in a Porsche 919 Hybrid. As of 2023, this was his last participation in the race.

== Career Accolades ==
- Spa 24 Hours overall winner: 2003
- FIA GT Championship N-GT/GT2 champion: 2003, 2005
- 24 Hours of Le Mans GT2 class winner: 2005, 2010, 2013
- Spa 24 Hours GT2 class winner: 2005
- Le Mans Series GT2 champion: 2006
- 24 Hours Nürburgring 2007 champion, 2008 champion, 2009 champion, 2011 champion
- Le Mans Series 2007 vice champion
- 24 Hours of Le Mans: Overall Winner 2016
- 13 overall victories in Nürburgring Endurance Series.

=== 24 Hours of Le Mans results ===
Year	Team	Co-drivers	Car	Class	Laps	Pos.	Class pos.
2003	(United States) Orbit Racing	(United States) Leo Hindery (United States) Peter Baron	Porsche 911 GT3-RS	GT	314	17th	2nd
2004	(United States) Orbit Racing (United States) BAM!	(United States) Leo Hindery (Germany) Mike Rockenfeller	Porsche 911 GT3-RS	GT	223	DNF	DNF
2005	(United States) Alex Job Racing (United States) BAM! Motorsport	(United States) Leo Hindery (Germany) Mike Rockenfeller	Porsche 911 GT3-RSR	GT2	332	10th	1st
2009	(Germany) Team Felbermayr-Proton	(Germany) Wolf Henzler (Austria) Richard Lietz	Porsche 997 GT3-RSR	GT2	24	DNF	DNF
2010	(Germany) Team Felbermayr-Proton	(Germany) Wolf Henzler (Austria) Richard Lietz	Porsche 997 GT3-RSR	GT2	338	11th	1st
2011	(Germany) Team Felbermayr-Proton	(Germany) Wolf Henzler (Austria) Richard Lietz	Porsche 997 GT3-RSR	GTE; Pro	312	16th	4th
2012	(Germany) Team Felbermayr-Proton	(Germany) Wolf Henzler (Austria) Richard Lietz	Porsche 997 GT3-RSR	GTE; Pro	184	DNF	DNF
2013	(Germany) Porsche AG Team Manthey	(France) Romain Dumas (Austria) Richard Lietz	Porsche 911 RSR	GTE; Pro	315	15th	1st
2014	(Germany) Porsche Team	(France) Romain Dumas (Switzerland) Neel Jani	Porsche 919 Hybrid	LMP1-H	348	11th	4th
2015	(Germany) Porsche Team	(France) Romain Dumas (Switzerland) Neel Jani	Porsche 919 Hybrid	LMP1	391	5th	5th
2016	(Germany) Porsche Team	(France) Romain Dumas (Switzerland) Neel Jani	Porsche 919 Hybrid	LMP1	384	1st	1st

=== Complete FIA World Endurance Championship results ===
Year	Entrant	Class	Chassis	Engine	1	2	3	4	5	6	7	8	9	Rank	Points
2012	Team Felbermayr-Proton	LMGTE Pro	Porsche 997 GT3-RSR	Porsche 4.0 L Flat-6	SEB; 2	SPA; 1	LMS; Ret	SIL; 3	SÃO; 3	BHR; 3	FUJ; 1	SHA; 2		39th	5.5
2013	Porsche AG Team Manthey	LMGTE Pro	Porsche 911 RSR	Porsche 4.0 L Flat-6	SIL; 4	SPA; 5	LMS; 1	SÃO; 4	COA; 4	FUJ; 4	SHA; 6	BHR; 4		4th	123
2014	Porsche Team	LMP1	Porsche 919 Hybrid	Porsche 2.0 L Turbo V4 (Hybrid)	SIL; Ret	SPA; 4	LMS; 5	COA; 4	FUJ; 4	SHA; 3	BHR; 2	SÃO; 1		3rd	117
2015	Porsche Team	LMP1	Porsche 919 Hybrid	Porsche 2.0 L Turbo V4 (Hybrid)	SIL; 2	SPA; 2	LMS; 5	NÜR; 2	COA; 12	FUJ; 2	SHA; 2	BHR; 1		3rd	138.5
2016	Porsche Team	LMP1	Porsche 919 Hybrid	Porsche 2.0 L Turbo V4 (Hybrid)	SIL; 1	SPA; 2	LMS; 1	NÜR; 4	MEX; 4	COA; 4	FUJ; 5	SHA; 4	BHR; 6	1st	160

=== Complete V8 Supercar results ===
Year	Team	No.	Car	1	2	3	4	5	6	7	8	9	10	11	12	13	14	15	16	17	18	19	20	21	22	23	24	25	26	27	28	29	30	31	32	33	34	35	36	Final pos	Points	Ref
2011	Stone Brothers Racing	4	Ford FG Falcon	YMC; R1	YMC; R2	ADE; R3	ADE; R4	HAM; R5	HAM; R6	PER; R7	PER; R8	PER; R9	WIN; R10	WIN; R11	HDV; R12	HDV; R13	TOW; R14	TOW; R15	QLD; R16	QLD; R17	QLD; R18	PHI; Q	PHI; R19	BAT; R20	SUR; R21; 23	SUR; R22; 18	SYM; R23	SYM; R24	SAN; R25	SAN; R26	SYD; R27	SYD; R28								74th	87	
2012	Tekno Autosports	19	Holden VE Commodore	ADE; R1	ADE; R2	SYM; R3	SYM; R4	HAM; R5	HAM; R6	PER; R7	PER; R8	PER; R9	PHI; R10	PHI; R11	HDV; R12	HDV; R13	TOW; R14	TOW; R15	QLD; R16	QLD; R17	SMP; R18	SMP; R19	SAN; Q	SAN; R20	BAT; R21	SUR; R22; 2	SUR; R23; 14	YMC; R24	YMC; R25	YMC; R26	WIN; R27	WIN; R28	SYD; R29	SYD; R30						NC	0 +	
2013	Tekno Autosports	19	Holden VF Commodore	ADE; R1	ADE; R2	SYM; R3	SYM; R4	SYM; R5	PUK; R6	PUK; R7	PUK; R8	PUK; R9	BAR; R10	BAR; R11	BAR; R12	COTA; R13	COTA; R14	COTA; R15	COTA; R16	HID; R17	HID; R18	HID; R19	TOW; R20	TOW; R21	QLD; R22	QLD; R23	QLD; R24	WIN; R25	WIN; R26	WIN; R27	SAN; R28; 13	BAT; R29; 12	SUR; R30; 10	SUR; R31; 17	PHI; R32	PHI; R33	PHI; R34	SYD; R35	SYD; R36	41st	402	

+ Not Eligible for points

=== Bathurst 1000 results ===
Year	Team	Car	Co-driver	Position	Lap	Ref
2013	Tekno Autosports	Holden VF Commodore	(Australia) Jonathon Webb	12th	161	

=== Complete Bathurst 12 Hour results ===
Year	Team	Co-drivers	Car	Class	Laps	Pos.	Class pos.	Ref
2017	(United States) Competition Motorsports	(Australia) David Calvert-Jones (United States) Patrick Long (Australia) Matt Campbell	Porsche 911 GT3 R	APA	289	2nd	1st	
2018	(United States) Black Swan Racing	(Netherlands) Jeroen Bleekemolen (United States) Tim Pappas (Germany) Luca Stolz	Porsche 911 GT3 R	APA	271	2nd	1st	
2019	(United States) Black Swan Racing	(Netherlands) Jeroen Bleekemolen (United States) Tim Pappas	Porsche 911 GT3 R	APA		DNS	DNS	

Sporting positions
Preceded by Timo Bernhard	Porsche Carrera Cup Germany; Champion; 2002	Succeeded by Frank Stippler
Preceded by Earl Bamber; Nico Hülkenberg; Nick Tandy	Winner of the 24 Hours of Le Mans; 2016; With: Romain Dumas & Neel Jani	Succeeded by Earl Bamber; Timo Bernhard; Brendon Hartley
Preceded by Mark Webber; Timo Bernhard; Brendon Hartley	FIA World Endurance Champion; 2016; With: Neel Jani & Romain Dumas	Succeeded by Brendon Hartley; Earl Bamber; Timo Bernhard
