= Jeroen Bleekemolen =

Dutch racing driver (born 1981)

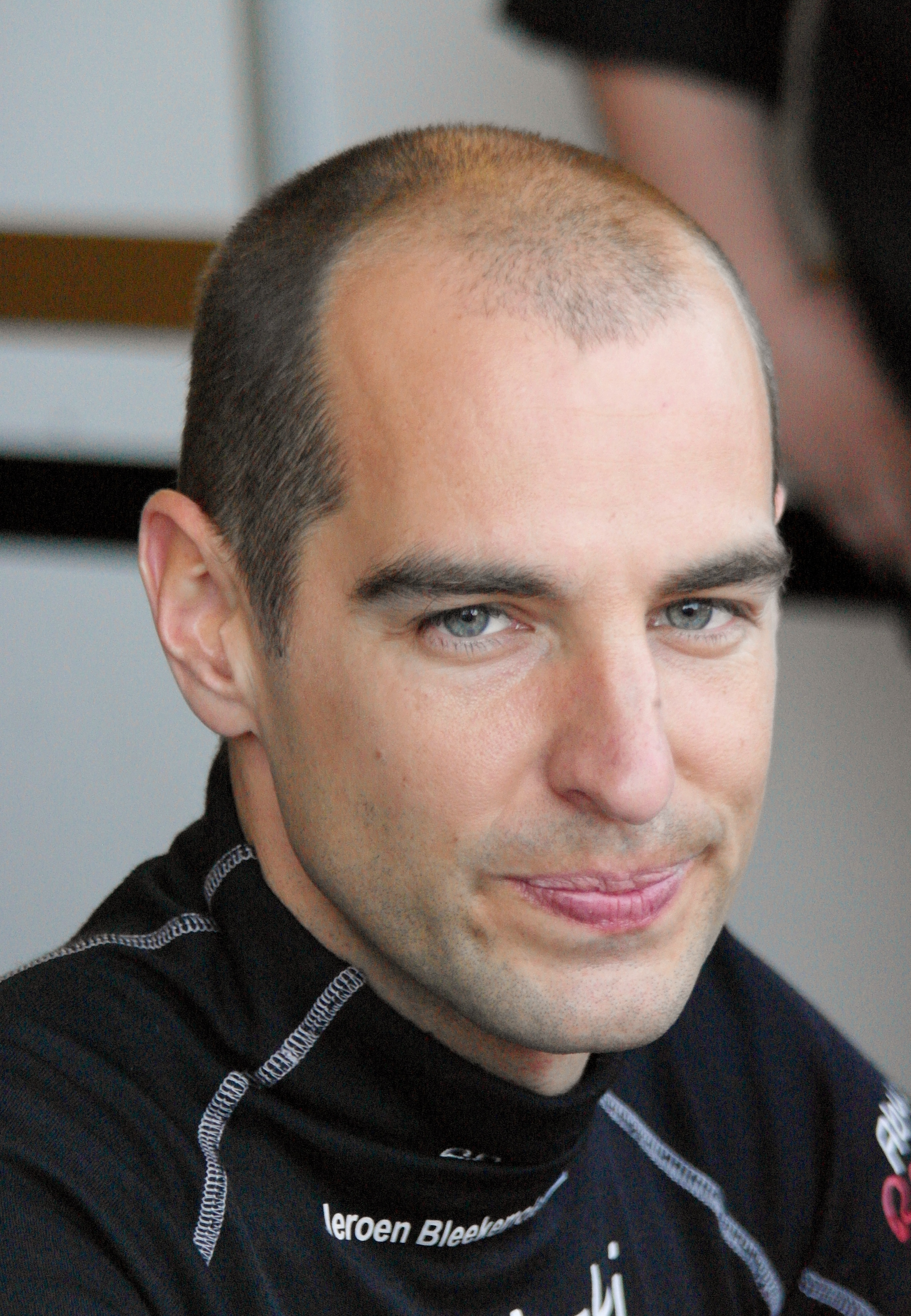
- Bleekemolen at the Brands Hatch round of the 2014 Blancpain Sprint Series season.
- Nationality: (Netherlands) Dutch
- Born: Jeroen Pascal Bleekemolen; 23 October 1981 (age 45) Heemstede, Netherlands
- Relatives: Michael Bleekemolen (father); Sebastiaan Bleekemolen (brother)
- Categorisation: FIA Platinum (until 2018); FIA Gold (2019–)

Previous series
- 2011 2010–11 2010 2010 2009–10 2009–10 2009 2008, 2010 2008–09 2008–09 2008 2008 2007, 2009 2007–08 2007–08 2007–08 2007–08 2007–08 2007 2006–10 2006, 2010 2006–07 2006 2005–11 2005, 2008 2005–07 2005–06 2005 2005 2005 2004–05 2003–04 2002 2002 2002 2002 2001 2001 2001 2000 1999 1998 1998: Dutch Winter Endurance; Rolex Sports Car Series; Le Mans Series; Toerwagen Diesel Cup; Dutch GT4 Championship; Dutch Winter Endurance; VLN; 24H Series; A1 Grand Prix; Dutch Winter Endurance; Dutch Renault Clio Cup; Shelby Can-Am; BRL V6; Le Mans Series; A1 Grand Prix; Dutch Winter Endurance; ADAC GT Masters; German Mini Challenge; Dutch Mini Challenge; German Carrera Cup; American Le Mans Series; A1 Grand Prix; DTM; Porsche Supercup; Benelux Formula Ford; FIA GT Championship; BRL V6; Dutch Winter Endurance; Dutch Historics; Dutch Porsche GT3 Cup; Dutch Winter Endurance; DTM; British Formula 3 Clio Trophy; Dutch Touring Cars; V8 Star; FIA GT Championship; International Clio Cup; Dutch Renault Clios; German Formula Three; Formula Palmer Audi; Benelux Formula Ford; Dutch Formula Ford

Championship titles
- 2010, 2013 2008–09 2005, 2007 2001 1998 1998: ALMS – GTC class Porsche Supercup; BRL V6; Dutch Renault Clios; Benelux Formula Ford; Dutch Formula Ford

Awards
- 1998: Dutch Talent of the Year

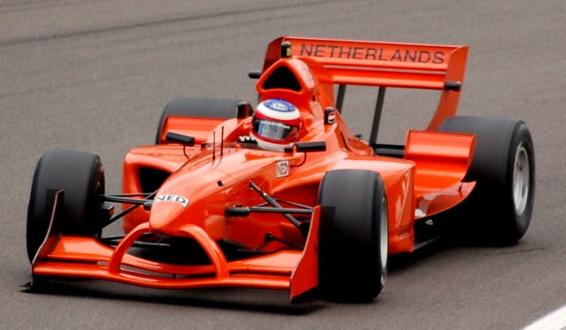
Bleekemolen driving for A1 Team Netherlands in the 2006–07 season at Zandvoort.

Jeroen Pascal Bleekemolen (born 23 October 1981 in Heemstede) is a Dutch professional racing driver. In the Chrysler Viper GTS-R, he drove in the FIA GT Championship, with great success. He competed in the German Formula Three Championship and drove a number of times at the Masters of Formula 3 at Circuit Zandvoort, the unofficial F3 World Championship. Together with Opel, he raced in the DTM. In 2005, Bleekemolen won the ELF BRL V6 championship.

Bleekemolen was the first driver for A1 Team Netherlands in the A1 Grand Prix series after replacing Jos Verstappen. Bleekemolen was a backup driver in the first season. He also participated, and took a class victory (and tenth overall), in the 2008 24 Hours of Le Mans race, driving the Van Merksteijn Motorsport's LMP2 class Porsche RS Spyder. He was then crowned Porsche Supercup champion in 2008 and 2009.

Bleekemolen is the son of former Formula One driver Michael Bleekemolen.

== Racing record ==
24 Hours of Le Mans career
- Years: 2006–2021
- Teams: Racing for Holland, Spyker Squadron, Van Merksteijn Motorsport, Rebellion Racing, Race Performance,Prospeed Competition, Riley Motorsports, Murphy Prototypes, Keating Motorsport, Team Project 1, Rinaldi Racing
- Best finish: 6th (2011)
- Class wins: 1 (2008)

=== Complete Deutsche Tourenwagen Masters results ===
(key)

Year	Team	Car	1	2	3	4	5	6	7	8	9	10	11	Pos.	Pts
2003	OPC Euroteam	Opel Astra V8 Coupé 2002	HOC; 14	ADR; 11	NÜR; 11	LAU; 18	NOR; 14	DON; 13	NÜR; Ret	A1R; 12	ZAN; 7	HOC; 15		14th	2
2004	OPC Euroteam	Opel Astra V8 Coupé	HOC; 12	EST; 19	ADR; 14	LAU; 17	NOR; 12	SHA; 12^{‡}	NÜR; 14	OSC; 18	ZAN; 13	BRN; 17	HOC; Ret	18th	0
2006	Futurecom TME	Audi A4 DTM 2004	HOC	LAU	OSC	BRH; 14	NOR; 12	NÜR	ZAN	CAT	BUG	HOC		20th	0

^{‡} - Shanghai was a non-championship round.

=== Complete Porsche Supercup results ===
(key) (Races in bold indicate pole position) (Races in italics indicate fastest lap)

Year	Team	1	2	3	4	5	6	7	8	9	10	11	12	13	DC	Pts
2005	Jetstream Motorsport	ITA	ESP	MON	GER	USA; 6	USA; 3	FRA	GBR	GER	HUN	ITA	BEL		NC‡	0‡
2006	Morellato Racing Team PZ Essen	BHR	ITA	GER1	ESP	MON	GBR	USA	USA	FRA	GER	HUN	ITA; 4		NC‡	0‡
2007	Bleekemolen Race Planet	BHR	BHR	ESP; 5	**MON**; 1										8th	85
2007	Golden Spike Pertamina Indonesia RT					FRA; Ret	GBR; 7	**GER**; 1	**HUN**; 2	**TUR**; 1	BEL; Ret	ITA; 2			8th	85
2008	Jetstream Motorsport	BHR; 2	BHR; 2	ESP; 2	TUR; Ret	**MON**; 1	FRA; 1	**GBR**; 14	GER; 3	HUN; 2	**ESP**; 1	BEL; 3	ITA; 3		**1st**	**192**
2009	Konrad Motorsport	**BHR**; 1	**BHR**; 1	**ESP**; 2	MON; 3	**TUR**; 1	GBR; 2	GER; 3	HUN; 3	ESP; 2	**BEL**; 1	ITA; 2	**UAE**; 3	**UAE**; 1	**1st**	**254**
2010	Al Faisal Lechner Racing	BHR; 5	BHR; 2	**ESP**; 3	MON; 6	ESP; 3	GBR	GER	HUN; 4	BEL	ITA; 20				7th	92
2011	Team Abu Dhabi by Tolimit	IST; 6	CAT; 5	MON; 4	NNS; 6	SIL; 6	GER; 6	HUN; 2	BEL; 4	ITA; 13	UAE; 7	UAE; 5			6th	129
2012	Lechner Racing	BHR	BHR	ESP	MON; 5	ESP	GBR	GER	HUN	HUN	BEL	ITA			NC‡	0‡
2013	Lechner Racing	ESP	MON; 4	GBR; 11	GER	HUN; 9	BEL; 6	ITA; 10	UAE; 8	UAE; 3					9th	67

‡ Not eligible for points.

=== Complete A1 Grand Prix results ===
(key) (Races in bold indicate pole position) (Races in italics indicate fastest lap)

Year	Entrant	1	2	3	4	5	6	7	8	9	10	11	12	13	14	15	16	17	18	19	20	21	22	DC	Pts
2006–07	Netherlands	NED; SPR; 9	NED; FEA; 4	CZE; SPR; 11	CZE; FEA; 9	**BEI**; **SPR**; 1	BEI; FEA; Ret	MYS; SPR; 7	MYS; FEA; 9	IDN; SPR; 13	IND; FEA; DSQ	NZL; SPR; 4	NZL; FEA; 5	AUS; SPR; 5	AUS; FEA; 4	RSA; SPR; 4	RSA; FEA; 6	MEX; SPR	MEX; FEA; 17	SHA; SPR	SHA; FEA	GBR; SPR; 6	GBR; SPR; 5	5th	57
2007–08	Netherlands	NED; SPR; 3	NED; FEA; 8	CZE; SPR; 5	**CZE**; **FEA**; 2	MYS; SPR; 18	MYS; FEA; 4	CHN; SPR; 9	CHN; FEA; Ret	NZL; SPR; 5	NZL; FEA; 8	AUS; SPR; 9	AUS; FEA; 8	RSA; SPR; 5	RSA; FEA; 4	MEX; SPR; 8	MEX; FEA; 4	CHN; SPR; 17	CHN; FEA; 18	GBR; SPR; 9	GBR; SPR; 6			7th	87
2008–09	Netherlands	**NED**; **SPR**; 4	NED; FEA; 5	CHN; SPR	CHN; FEA	MYS; SPR; 6	MYS; FEA; 8	NZL; SPR	NZL; FEA	**RSA**; **SPR**; 1	RSA; FEA; 4	POR; SPR	POR; FEA	GBR; SPR; 6	GBR; SPR; 2									4th	81

=== Complete 24 Hours of Le Mans results ===
Year	Team	Co-drivers	Car	Class	Laps	Pos.	Class pos.
2006	(Netherlands) Spyker Squadron b.v.	(Netherlands) Mike Hezemans (United Kingdom) Jonny Kane	Spyker C8 Spyder GT2-R	GT2	202	DNF	DNF
2007	(Netherlands) Racing for Holland b.v.	(Netherlands) Jan Lammers (Netherlands) David Hart	Dome S101.5-Judd	LMP1	305	25th	8th
2008	(Netherlands) Van Merksteijn Motorsport	(Netherlands) Peter van Merksteijn Sr. (Netherlands) Jos Verstappen	Porsche RS Spyder Evo	LMP2	354	10th	**1st**
2009	(Netherlands) Snoras Spyker Squadron	(Netherlands) Tom Coronel (Czech Republic) Jaroslav Janiš	Spyker C8 Laviolette GT2-R	GT2	319	25th	5th
2010	(Netherlands) Spyker Squadron	(Netherlands) Tom Coronel (United Kingdom) Peter Dumbreck	Spyker C8 Laviolette GT2-R	GT2	280	27th	9th
2011	(Switzerland) Rebellion Racing	(France) Nicolas Prost (Switzerland) Neel Jani	Lola B10/60-Toyota	LMP1	338	6th	6th
2012	(Switzerland) Rebellion Racing	(Italy) Andrea Belicchi (Switzerland) Harold Primat	Lola B12/60-Toyota	LMP1	350	11th	7th
2013	(Switzerland) Race Performance	(Switzerland) Michel Frey (Switzerland) Patric Niederhauser	Oreca 03-Judd	LMP2	314	18th	9th
2014	(Belgium) Prospeed Competition	(United States) Cooper MacNeil	Porsche 997 GT3-RSR	GTE; Pro	319	33rd	5th
2015	(United States) Riley Motorsports-TI Auto	(United States) Ben Keating (United States) Marc Miller	SRT Viper GTS-R	GTE; Am	304	DNF	DNF
2016	(Republic of Ireland) Murphy Prototypes	(Belgium) Marc Goossens (United States) Ben Keating	Oreca 03R-Nissan	LMP2	323	34th	15th
2017	(United States) Keating Motorsport	(United States) Ben Keating (United States) Ricky Taylor	Riley Mk. 30-Gibson	LMP2	312	47th	20th
2018	(United States) Keating Motorsport	(United States) Ben Keating (Germany) Luca Stolz	Ferrari 488 GTE	GTE; Am	334	28th	**3rd**
2019	(United States) Keating Motorsport	(United States) Ben Keating (Brazil) Felipe Fraga	Ford GT	GTE; Am	334	DSQ	DSQ
2020	(Germany) Team Project 1	(United States) Ben Keating (Brazil) Felipe Fraga	Porsche 911 RSR	GTE; Am	326	40th	14th
2021	(Germany) Rinaldi Racing	(Germany) Pierre Ehret (Germany) Christian Hook	Ferrari 488 GTE Evo	GTE; Am	271	DNF	DNF

=== Complete European Le Mans Series results ===
(key) (Races in bold indicate pole position; races in italics indicate fastest lap)

Year	Entrant	Class	Chassis	Engine	1	2	3	4	5	6	Pos.	Points
2006	Spyker Squadron	GT2	Spyker C8 Spyder GT2-R	Audi 3.8L V8	IST; 5	SPA; 10	NÜR; 3	DON; Ret	JAR; Ret		10th	10
2007	Racing for Holland	LMP1	Dome S101.5	Judd GV5.5 S2 5.5L V10	MNZ; 8	VAL; Ret	NÜR; 7	SPA	SIL	INT	23rd	3
2008	Van Merksteijn Motorsport	LMP2	Porsche RS Spyder Evo	Porsche MR6 3.4 L V8	CAT	MNZ	SPA	**NÜR**; 1	SIL		9th	10
2010	Spyker Squadron	GT2	Spyker C8 Laviolette GT2-R	Audi 4.0 L V8	LEC; 8	SPA	ALG; 9	HUN	SIL		16th	18
2022	Rinaldi Racing	LMGTE	Ferrari 488 GTE Evo	Ferrari F154CB 3.9 L Turbo V8	LEC	IMO	MNZ; 9	CAT	SPA; WD	ALG; Ret	24th	2

=== Touring car racing ===
==== V8 Supercar results ====
Year	Team	No.	Car	1	2	3	4	5	6	7	8	9	10	11	12	13	14	15	16	17	18	19	20	21	22	23	24	25	26	27	28	29	30	31	32	33	34	35	36	Pos.	Pts
2012	Stone Brothers Racing	9	Ford FG Falcon	ADE; R1	ADE; R2	SYM; R3	SYM; R4	HAM; R5	HAM; R6	BAR; R7	BAR; R8	BAR; R9	PHI; R10	PHI; R11	HID; R12	HID; R13	TOW; R14	TOW; R15	QLD; R16	QLD; R17	SMP; R18	SMP; R19	SAN; Q	SAN; R20	BAT; R21	SUR; R22; 10	SUR; R23; 9	YMC; R24	YMC; R25	YMC; R26	WIN; R27	WIN; R28	SYD; R29	SYD; R30						NC	0 †
2013	Tekno Autosports	97	Holden VF Commodore	ADE; R1	ADE; R2	SYM; R3	SYM; R4	SYM; R5	PUK; R6	PUK; R7	PUK; R8	PUK; R9	BAR; R10	BAR; R11	BAR; R12	COTA; R13	COTA; R14	COTA; R15	COTA; R16	HID; R17	HID; R18	HID; R19	TOW; R20	TOW; R21	QLD; R22	QLD; R23	QLD; R24	WIN; R25	WIN; R26	WIN; R27	SAN; R28; 12	BAT; R29; 11	SUR; R30; 2	SUR; R31; Ret	PHI; R32	PHI; R33	PHI; R34	SYD; R35	SYD; R36	40th	420

† Not Eligible for points

=== Bathurst 1000 results ===
Year	Team	Car	Co-driver	Position	Lap
2013	Tekno Autosports	Holden Commodore VF	(New Zealand) Shane van Gisbergen	11th	161

=== Complete Blancpain GT Series Sprint Cup results ===
Year	Team	Car	Class	1	2	3	4	5	6	7	8	9	10	11	12	13	14	Pos.	Pts
2014	Grasser Racing Team	Lamborghini Gallardo FL2	Pro	**NOG**; **QR**; 17	NOG; CR; 6	BRH; QR; 1	BRH; CR; 1	**ZAN**; **QR**; 1	ZAN; CR; 5	SVK; QR; 2	SVK; CR; Ret	ALG; QR; 1	ALG; CR; 2	ZOL; QR; 3	ZOL; CR; 2	BAK; QR; 15	BAK; CR; Ret	**3rd**	**115**
2015	Rinaldi Racing	Ferrari 458 GT3	Pro	NOG; QR	NOG; CR	BRH; QR	BRH; CR	ZOL; QR	ZOL; CR	MOS; QR	MOS; CR	ALG; QR	ALG; CR	MIS; QR	MIS; CR	ZAN; QR; 4	ZAN; CR; DNS	30th	3
2016	GRT Grasser Racing Team	Lamborghini Huracán GT3	Pro	MIS; QR; Ret	MIS; CR; Ret	BRH; QR; 16	BRH; CR; 17	NÜR; QR	NÜR; CR	HUN; QR	HUN; CR	CAT; QR	CAT; CR					NC	0

=== Complete IMSA SportsCar Championship results ===
(key) (Races in bold indicate pole position) (Races in italics indicate fastest lap)

Year	Team	Class	Make	Engine	1	2	3	4	5	6	7	8	9	10	11	12	Pos.	Points	Ref
2014	Riley Motorsports	GTD	SRT Viper GT3-R	SRT 8.0 V10	DAY; 19	SEB; 24	LGA; 16	DET; 11	WGL; 17	**MOS**; 1	IMS; 3	ELK; 4	VIR	COA; 1	PET; 17		17th	202	
2015	Riley Motorsports	GTD	SRT Viper GT3-R	SRT 8.3 V10	DAY; 9	**SEB**; 9	LGA; 11	DET; 10	WGL; 6	LIM; 2	ELK; 1	VIR; 7	COA; 1	PET; 12			6th	265	
2016	Riley Motorsports	GTD	SRT Viper GT3-R	SRT 8.3 V10	DAY; 9	SEB; 12	LGA; 6	DET; 1	WGL; 4	MOS; 11	LIM; 3	ELK; 1	VIR; 6	COA; 13	**PET**; 1		2nd	303	
2017	Riley Motorsports - Team AMG	GTD	Mercedes-AMG GT3	Mercedes-AMG M159 6.2 V8	DAY; 3	SEB; 1	LBH; 2	COA; 1	DET; 14	WGL; 10	MOS; 7	LIM; 15	ELK; 4	VIR; 3	LGA; 8	PET; 4	2nd	320	
2018	Mercedes-AMG Team Riley Motorsports	GTD	Mercedes-AMG GT3	Mercedes-AMG M159 6.2 V8	DAY; 4	SEB; 3	MDO; 9	DET; 4	WGL; 5	MOS; 1	LIM; 6	ELK; 5	VIR; 5	LGA; 3	PET; 8		3rd	299	
2019	Mercedes-AMG Team Riley Motorsports	GTD	Mercedes-AMG GT3	Mercedes-AMG M159 6.2 L V8	DAY; 6	SEB; 5	MDO; 14	DET	WGL; 15	MOS; 7	LIM; 9	**ELK**; 14	VIR; 1	LGA; 5	PET; 4		7th	236	
2020	Black Swan Racing	GTD	Porsche 911 GT3 R	Porsche 4.0 L Flat-6	DAY; 5	DAY	SEB	ELK	VIR	ATL	MDO	CLT	PET	LGA	SEB		43rd	26	
2021	Riley Motorsports	LMP3	Ligier JS P320	Nissan VK56DE 5.6 L V8	DAY; 4†	SEB; 2	MDO	WGL; 3	WGL	ELK	PET; 3						10th	998	
2022	GMG Racing	GTD	Porsche 911 GT3 R	Porsche MA1.76/MDG.G 4.0 L Flat-6	DAY; 22	SEB	LBH	LGA	MDO	DET	WGL	MOS	LIM	ELK	VIR	PET	71st	106	
2023	Kelly-Moss with Riley	GTD	Porsche 911 GT3 R (992)	Porsche 4.2 L Flat-6	DAY; 22	SEB	LBH; 13	LGA	WGL	MOS	LIM	ELK	VIR	IMS	PET		49th	311	

^{†} Points only counted towards the Michelin Endurance Cup, and not the overall LMP3 Championship. ^{*} Season still in progress.

=== Complete FIA World Endurance Championship results ===
(key) (Races in bold indicate pole position) (Races in italics indicate fastest lap)

Year	Entrant	Class	Car	Engine	1	2	3	4	5	6	7	8	Rank	Points
2012	Rebellion Racing	LMP1	Lola B11/60	Toyota RV8KLM 3.4 L V8	SEB; 19	SPA							45th	4.5
2012	Rebellion Racing	LMP1	Lola B12/60	Toyota RV8KLM 3.4 L V8			LMS; 9	SIL	SÃO	BHR	FUJ	SHA	45th	4.5
2014	AF Corse	LMGTE Am	Ferrari 458 Italia GT2	Ferrari 4.5 L V8	SIL	SPA	LMS	COA	FUJ; 5	SHA	BHR	SÃO	21st	10
2019–20	Team Project 1	LMGTE Am	Porsche 911 RSR	Porsche 4.0 L Flat-6	SIL; 10	FUJ; 3	SHA; 2	**BHR**; 1	COA; 11	SPA; 6	LMS; 8	BHR; 6	6th	101.5

Sporting positions
Preceded by Christijan Albers	Dutch Formula Ford Championship; Champion; 1998	Succeeded by Vincent van der Valk
Preceded by unknown	Benelux Formula Ford Championship; Champion; 1998	Succeeded by Jaap van Lagen
Preceded by Richard Westbrook	Porsche Supercup; Champion; 2008–2009	Succeeded by René Rast
Preceded by Alessandro Balzan; Christina Nielsen	North American/Michelin Endurance Cup; GTD Champion; 2017-2019; With: Mario Farnbacher (2017), Ben Keating (2017-19), Luca Stolz (2018) & Felipe Fraga (2019)	Succeeded by Bryan Sellers; Madison Snow; Corey Lewis
