= Texas 400 =

Texas 400 can refer to three races:

- Würth 400, current NASCAR Cup Series race at Texas Motor Speedway
- Budweiser NASCAR 400, former NASCAR Winston Cup Series race at Texas World Speedway
- Austin 400, former V8 Supercar race held at Circuit of the Americas
