= 2013 International V8 Supercars Championship =

Motor racing competition

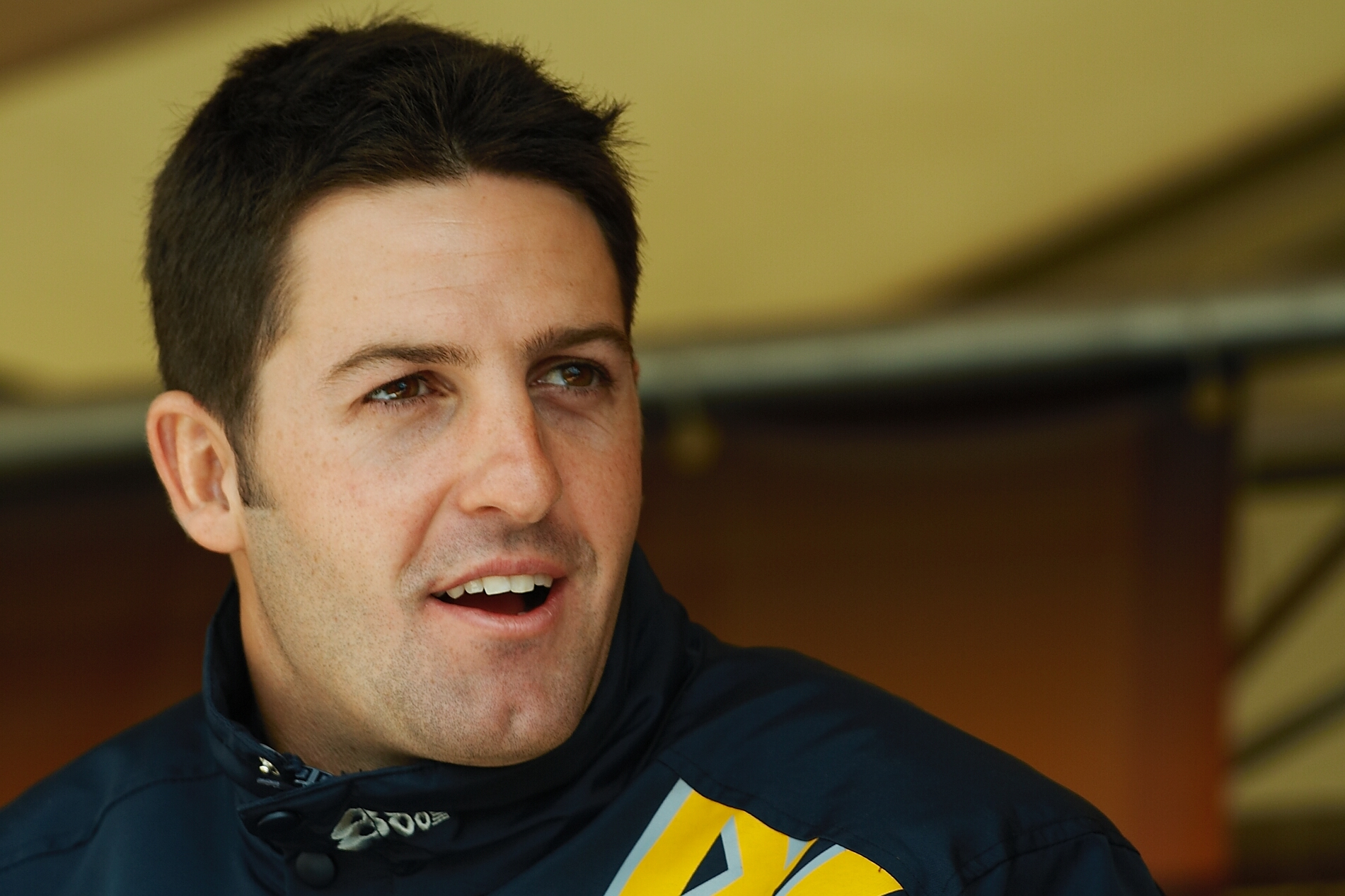
Jamie Whincup, the defending drivers' champion, won his fifth title.

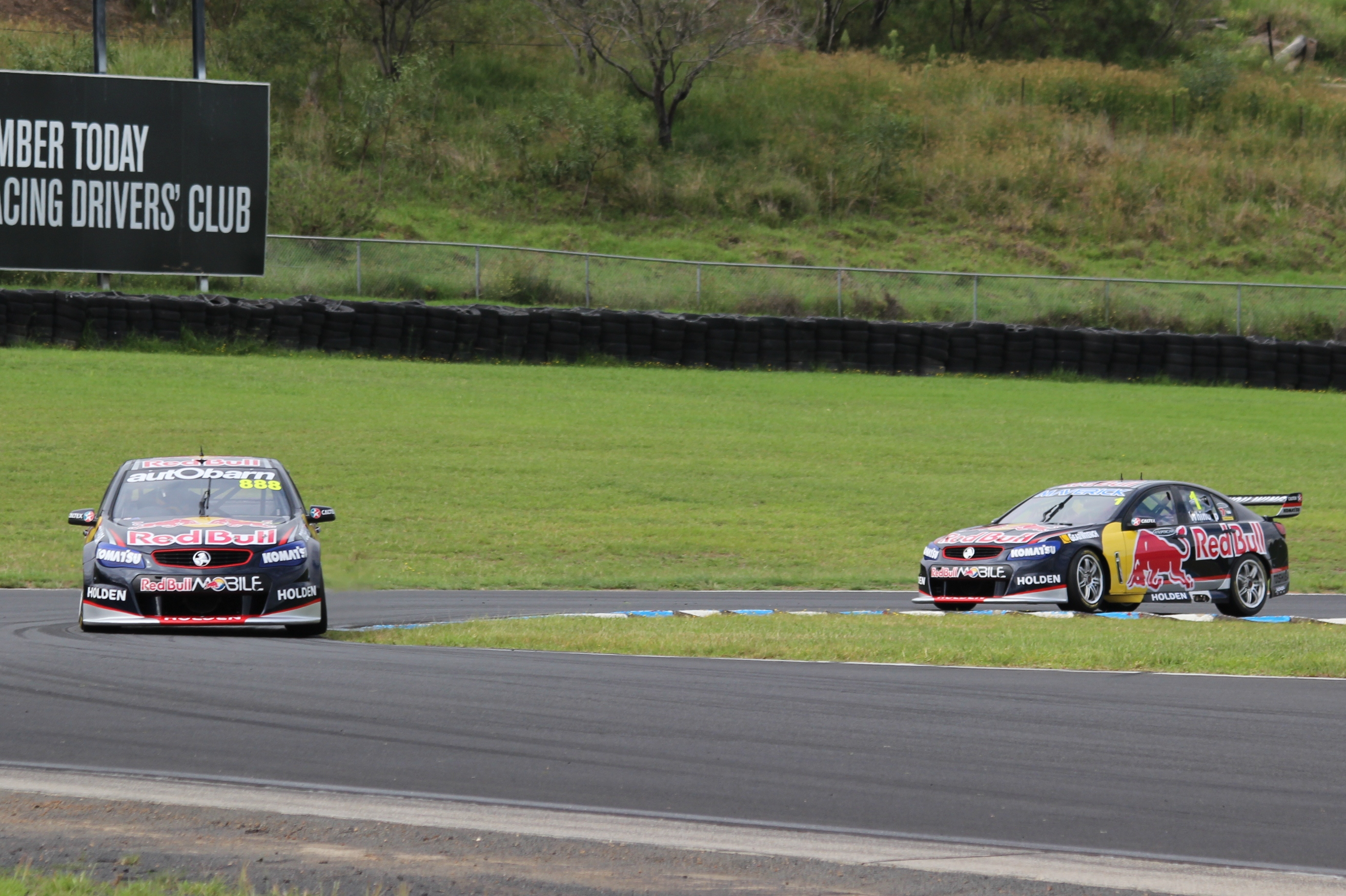
Triple Eight Race Engineering—competing as Red Bull Racing Australia—won the teams' championship for the fourth consecutive season.

The 2013 International V8 Supercars Championship (often simplified to the 2013 V8 Supercars Championship) was a FIA-sanctioned international motor racing series for V8 Supercars. It was the fifteenth running of the V8 Supercars Championship and the seventeenth series in which V8 Supercars contested the premier Australian touring car title.

The 2013 season saw the introduction of the "New Generation V8 Supercar", a revision to the regulations which were designed to cut costs and to make the series more attractive to new manufacturers. Nissan and Mercedes-Benz also entered the series.

Holden teams competed with the new VF Commodore, which replaced the VE model, whilst Ford continued to use the FG Falcon.

Jamie Whincup successfully defended his drivers' championship title and Triple Eight Race Engineering won their fourth consecutive teams' championship.

== Teams and drivers ==
The following teams and drivers competed in the 2013 championship.

Championship entries						Endurance entries	
Manufacturer	Model	Team	No.	Driver name	Rounds	Co-driver name	Rounds
Ford	Falcon FG	Ford Performance Racing	5	(Australia) Mark Winterbottom	All	(New Zealand) Steven Richards	10–12
Ford	Falcon FG	Ford Performance Racing	6	(Australia) Will Davison	All	(Australia) Steve Owen	10–12
Ford	Falcon FG	Dick Johnson Racing	12	(New Zealand) Jonny Reid	1–3	—N/a	
Ford	Falcon FG	Dick Johnson Racing	12	(Australia) Chaz Mostert	4–14	(Australia) Dale Wood	10–12
Ford	Falcon FG	Dick Johnson Racing	17	(Australia) Tim Blanchard	All	(Australia) Ashley Walsh	10–12
Ford	Falcon FG	Charlie Schwerkolt Racing (FPR)	18	(Australia) Alex Davison	All	(New Zealand) John McIntyre	10–12
Ford	Falcon FG	Rod Nash Racing (FPR)	55	(Australia) David Reynolds	All	(Australia) Dean Canto	10–12
Holden	Commodore VF	Triple Eight Race Engineering	1	(Australia) Jamie Whincup	All	(Australia) Paul Dumbrell	10–12
Holden	Commodore VF	Triple Eight Race Engineering	888	(Australia) Craig Lowndes	All	(Australia) Warren Luff	10–12
Holden	Commodore VF	Holden Racing Team	2	(Australia) Garth Tander	All	(Australia) Nick Percat	10–12
Holden	Commodore VF	Holden Racing Team	22	(Australia) James Courtney	1–13	(New Zealand) Greg Murphy	10–12
Holden	Commodore VF	Holden Racing Team	22	(Australia) Nick Percat	14	—N/a	
Holden	Commodore VF	Tony D'Alberto Racing	3	(Australia) Tony D'Alberto	All	(New Zealand) Jonny Reid	10–12
Holden	Commodore VF	Brad Jones Racing	8	(Australia) Jason Bright	All	(Australia) Andrew Jones	10–12
Holden	Commodore VF	Brad Jones Racing	14	(New Zealand) Fabian Coulthard	All	(Australia) Luke Youlden	10–12
Holden	Commodore VF	Tekno Autosports	19	(Australia) Jonathon Webb	All	(Germany) Marc Lieb	10–12
Holden	Commodore VF	Tekno Autosports	97	(New Zealand) Shane van Gisbergen	All	(Netherlands) Jeroen Bleekemolen	10–12
Holden	Commodore VF	Britek Motorsport (BJR)	21	(Australia) David Wall	All	(New Zealand) Chris Pither	10–12
Holden	Commodore VF	Garry Rogers Motorsport	33	(New Zealand) Scott McLaughlin	All	(Australia) Jack Perkins	10–12
Holden	Commodore VF	Garry Rogers Motorsport	34	(France) Alexandre Prémat	All	(Australia) Greg Ritter	10–12
Holden	Commodore VF	Walkinshaw Racing (HRT)	66	(Australia) Russell Ingall	All	(Australia) Ryan Briscoe	10–12
Holden	Commodore VF	Lucas Dumbrell Motorsport	80	(Australia) Scott Pye	1–2, 4–14 (Note: Scott Pye was ruled out of the third event of the championship at Pukekohe Park Raceway after crashing heavily at Symmons Plains Raceway. The damage to his car was so extensive that Lucas Dumbrell Motorsport were unable to repair it in time for the race.)	(Australia) Paul Morris	10–12
Holden	Commodore VF	Lucas Dumbrell Motorsport	88	(Australia) Dean Fiore	All	(New Zealand) Matthew Halliday	10–12
Mercedes-Benz	E63 AMG	Erebus Motorsport	4	(Australia) Lee Holdsworth	All	(New Zealand) Craig Baird	10–12
Mercedes-Benz	E63 AMG	Erebus Motorsport	9	(Germany) Maro Engel	All	(Australia) Steven Johnson	10–12
Mercedes-Benz	E63 AMG	James Rosenberg Racing (EM)	47	(Australia) Tim Slade	All	(Australia) Andrew Thompson	10–11
Mercedes-Benz	E63 AMG	James Rosenberg Racing (EM)	47	(Australia) Tim Slade	All	(Australia) David Brabham	12
Nissan	Altima L33	Nissan Motorsport	7	(Australia) Todd Kelly	All	(Australia) David Russell	10–12
Nissan	Altima L33	Nissan Motorsport	15	(Australia) Rick Kelly	All	(Australia) Karl Reindler	10–12
Nissan	Altima L33	Nissan Motorsport	36	(Australia) Michael Caruso	All	(New Zealand) Daniel Gaunt	10–12
Nissan	Altima L33	Nissan Motorsport	360	(Australia) James Moffat	All	(Australia) Taz Douglas	10–12
Wildcard entries
Holden	Commodore VF	Triple Eight Race Engineering	10	—N/a		(Sweden) Mattias Ekström (United Kingdom) Andy Priaulx	11

=== Team changes ===
All teams competing with the Holden Commodore upgraded to the new VF model.

After switching from Holden to Ford after the first event of the 2011 season, Tony D'Alberto Racing moved back to Holden in 2013, where the team received technical assistance from Walkinshaw Performance.

Ford Performance Racing expanded to a four-car operation with the acquisition of the #18 Racing Entitlement Contract held by Charlie Schwerkolt, which was used by Dick Johnson Racing to run James Moffat's car in 2012. The fourth car was run as a satellite of the team, in the same fashion as the #55 Rod Nash Racing entry.

In January 2013, British motorsport group Prodrive announced that it had sold its stake in Ford Performance Racing to Rod Nash and former Australian GT Champion Rusty French.

Lucas Dumbrell Motorsport expanded to a two-car operation after purchasing the #49 Racing Entitlement Contract from Paul Morris Motorsport. The team also acquired two VF Commodores constructed by Triple Eight Race Engineering.

As a result of the deals between Schwerkolt and Ford Performance Racing and Paul Morris and Lucas Dumbrell Motorsport, Dick Johnson Racing lost the use of the #18 and #49 Racing Entitlement Contracts and was reduced to a two-car operation with its existing #17 REC and by leasing Triple F Racing's #12 REC.

Kelly Racing switched from competing with Holden Commodores to Nissan Altimas, running a re-sleeved version of Nissan's quad-cam aluminium 5.6-litre VK56DE V8 reconfigured to a 5.0-litre capacity. The team was renamed to Nissan Motorsport, a name last used by Gibson Motorsport in 1991.

In January 2013, Larry Perkins confirmed that he had sold his two Racing Entitlement Contracts to Kelly Racing. Perkins had previously leased the #11 and #16 RECs to the Kelly operation, and by purchasing them, Kelly Racing acquired full control over the licences. To satisfy sponsor requirements, the 2 former Perkins RECs used numbers 36 and 360.

Stone Brothers Racing was purchased by Australian GT Championship team Erebus Motorsport, and the organisation, along with satellite team James Rosenberg Racing, ended their association with Ford. Instead, the combined team entered three cars based on the Mercedes-Benz E63 W212, powered by a M159 engine. The combined Erebus—James Rosenberg outfit did not receive any factory support from Mercedes-Benz.

=== Driver changes ===
Steven Johnson was forced out of his seat at Dick Johnson Racing as a result of the team's on-going financial troubles. He took on the position of general manager in the team's organisational structure, whilst contesting the Australian Carrera Cup Championship. He would later drive in the endurance events for Erebus Motorsport.

Johnson's departure led to Tim Blanchard joining the series full-time with DJR. Blanchard had previously contested the endurance races in 2011 and 2012 with Kelly Racing before replacing the injured Todd Kelly for the final four events of the 2012 season. 2012 V8SuperTourer runner-up Jonny Reid also joined DJR in the second seat, replacing Dean Fiore.

James Moffat would lose his seat at DJR as the #18 REC was returned to Charlie Schwerkolt Racing. Moffat would join the factory-backed Nissan Motorsport as the replacement for Greg Murphy. Murphy had left Kelly Racing at the end of 2012 and was unable to find a full-time seat. He would later join the Holden Racing Team for the endurance races.

Alex Davison returned to the series after a one-year absence to join the new Schwerkolt team, which ran as a satellite team of FPR.

As a result of the REC changes surrounding Dick Johnson Racing, Dean Fiore moved from DJR to Lucas Dumbrell Motorsport, and leased the Triple F Racing REC back to DJR so they could continue to run two cars. Taz Douglas would leave the category after one year racing for LDM, and returned to the Dunlop V8 Supercar Series. Steve Owen lost his seat as the #49 REC was sold to LDM. Owen would join Ford Performance Racing for the endurance events. Scott Pye, who placed second in the 2012 Dunlop V8 Supercar Series, joined LDM in the second seat.

Karl Reindler left Kelly Racing at the end of 2012, and moved to the Australian Carrera Cup Championship. Michael Caruso left Garry Rogers Motorsport after five seasons to take Reindler's seat at the renamed Nissan Motorsport team. Reigning second-tier V8 Supercar champion and New Zealand V8SuperTourer champion Scott McLaughlin then joined GRM full-time, having raced for the team as an emergency replacement in the final race of the 2012 season.

At the end of the 2012 season, Shane van Gisbergen announced plans to leave the category in order to rejuvenate himself and consider his future. This announcement came after Stone Brothers Racing had been purchased by Erebus Motorsport. He later announced in January 2013 that he would return to the championship, replacing Michael Patrizi at Tekno Autosports. Patrizi would return to the Australian Carrera Cup Championship.

As a result of Van Gisbergen's departure, former Deutsche Tourenwagen Masters driver Maro Engel would make his series debut with Erebus Motorsport, continuing his long association with Mercedes-Benz.

=== Mid-season changes ===
Jonny Reid was replaced by Dunlop Series driver Chaz Mostert at Dick Johnson Racing prior to the Perth 360.

Following a major accident at the Phillip Island event, James Courtney was forced to miss the Sydney 500. He was replaced by the Holden Racing Team's endurance co-driver, Nick Percat.

=== Wildcard entries ===
There was one wildcard entry for the Bathurst 1000 as Triple Eight Race Engineering entered international stars Mattias Ekström and Andy Priaulx in a third car for the Great Race.

== Calendar ==
The 2013 calendar was released on 15 October 2012. The season consisted of thirty-six races to be held at fourteen venues in Australia, New Zealand and the United States, plus an additional non-championship event that was held at the Melbourne Grand Prix Circuit in support of the 2013 Australian Grand Prix.

Rnd.	Event name	Circuit	Location	Format	Date
1	(South Australia) Adelaide 500	Adelaide Street Circuit	Adelaide, South Australia	2	2–3 March
2	Tasmania 365	Symmons Plains Raceway	Launceston, Tasmania	S	6–7 April
3	(New Zealand) Auckland 400	Pukekohe Park Raceway	Pukekohe, New Zealand	4	13–14 April
4	(Western Australia) Perth 360	Barbagallo Raceway	Perth, Western Australia	S	4–5 May
5	(United States) Austin 400	Circuit of the Americas	Austin, Texas, USA	4	18–19 May
6	(Northern Territory) Darwin Triple Crown	Hidden Valley Raceway	Darwin, Northern Territory	S	15–16 June
7	(Queensland) Townsville 400	Reid Park Street Circuit	Townsville, Queensland	2	6–7 July
8	(Queensland) Ipswich 360	Queensland Raceway	Ipswich, Queensland	S	27–28 July
9	(Victoria (state)) Winton 360	Winton Motor Raceway	Benalla, Victoria	S	24–25 August
10	(Victoria (state)) Sandown 500	Sandown Raceway	Melbourne, Victoria	E	15 September
11	(New South Wales) Bathurst 1000	Mount Panorama Circuit	Bathurst, New South Wales	E	13 October
12	(Queensland) Gold Coast 600	Surfers Paradise Street Circuit	Surfers Paradise, Queensland	E	26–27 October
13	(Victoria (state)) Phillip Island 360	Phillip Island Grand Prix Circuit	Phillip Island, Victoria	S	23–24 November
14	(New South Wales) Sydney 500	Homebush Street Circuit	Sydney, New South Wales	2	7–8 December

Icon	Meaning
2	Two races
4	Four races
E	Endurance Cup
S	60/60 Sprint race

Australian rounds
New Zealand rounds
United States rounds

=== Calendar changes ===
The Circuit of the Americas in Austin, Texas hosted an event of the championship on 17–19 May. The series used the shorter "national" circuit, instead of the full layout.

The Hamilton 400 was held for the final time in 2012. It was replaced by an event at Pukekohe Park Raceway, which last hosted a championship event in 2007. The Pukekohe Park circuit was reconfigured to accommodate the category after it was awarded "International" status by the FIA in 2011. This act required the circuit to meet the criteria for an FIA Grade-2 certification, necessitating the changes.

After returning to the calendar in 2012, Sydney Motorsport Park did not host an event in 2013.

The Yas Marina Circuit was initially scheduled to host the Yas V8 400 in support of the 2013 Abu Dhabi Grand Prix, but with the Grand Prix support bill expanding to include rounds of the GP2 and GP3 Series championships, the event was removed from the V8 Supercars calendar.

=== Format changes ===
The events at Symmons Plains, Barbagallo, Hidden Valley, Queensland Raceway, Winton and Phillip Island all featured a new three-race format, dubbed the "60/60 Sprint" format. The Saturday race was 120-kilometres in length but split into two 60-kilometre halves with a fifteen-minute break in between to allow teams the opportunity to service their cars. The starting grid for the second half of the race was determined by the finishing order of the first half of the race. The remaining two races were then held on Sunday at 100-kilometres in length each. Originally, a driver who finished one lap down in the first half would remain one lap down at the start of the second half of the race. This was changed following the Symmons Plains event, with drivers who were a lap down at the end of the first half gaining the lap back for the second half.

Teams were no longer required to compete with a co-driver from an international racing series for the Gold Coast 600. Instead, teams were free to partner each of their drivers with any co-driver they choose, and allowed to enter the same co-drivers for the Sandown 500, Bathurst 1000 and Gold Coast 600. The drivers with the most points from the three endurance races received the "Enduro Cup", a new trophy introduced for 2013.

== Rule changes ==
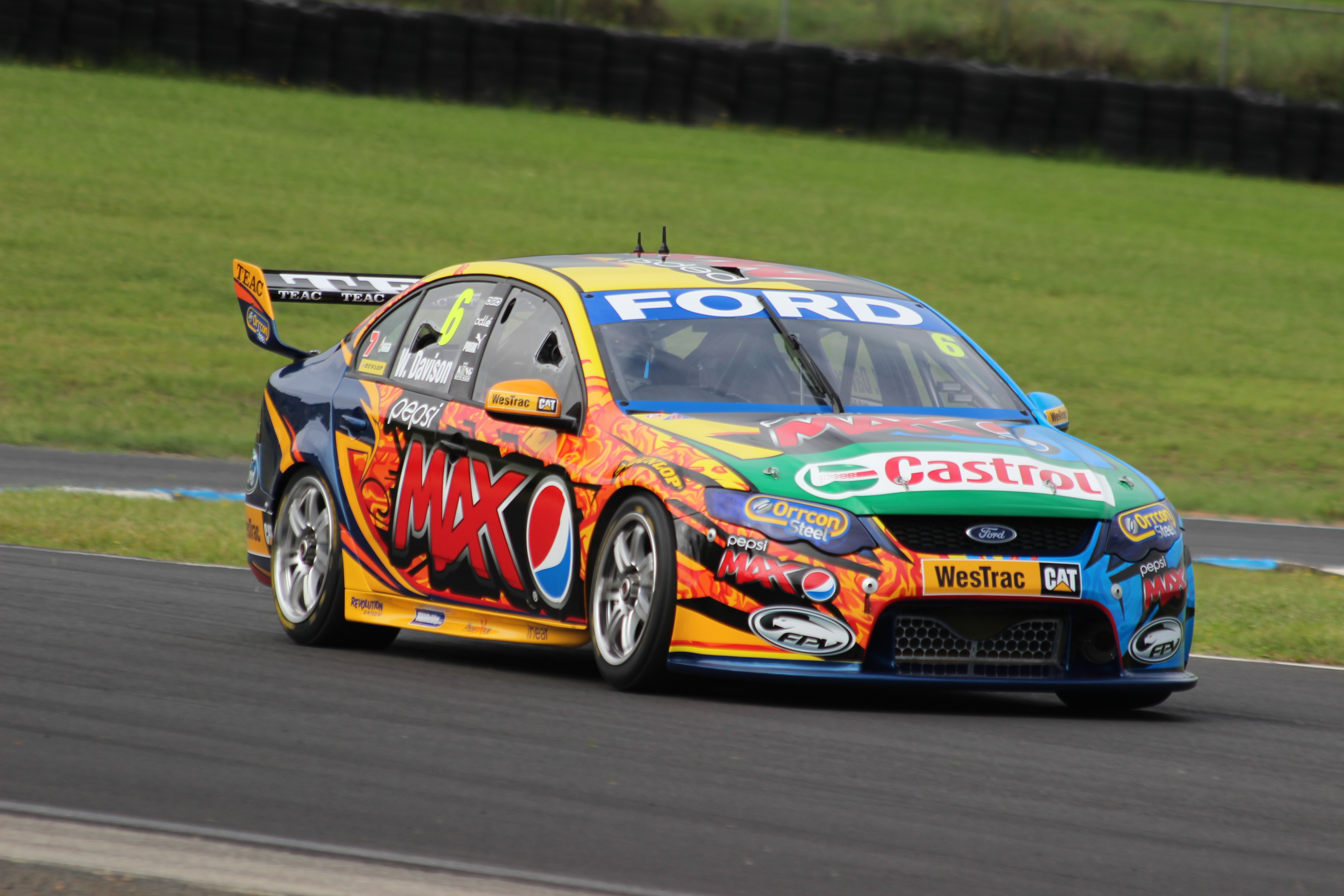
A Ford Falcon FG, driven by Will Davison.

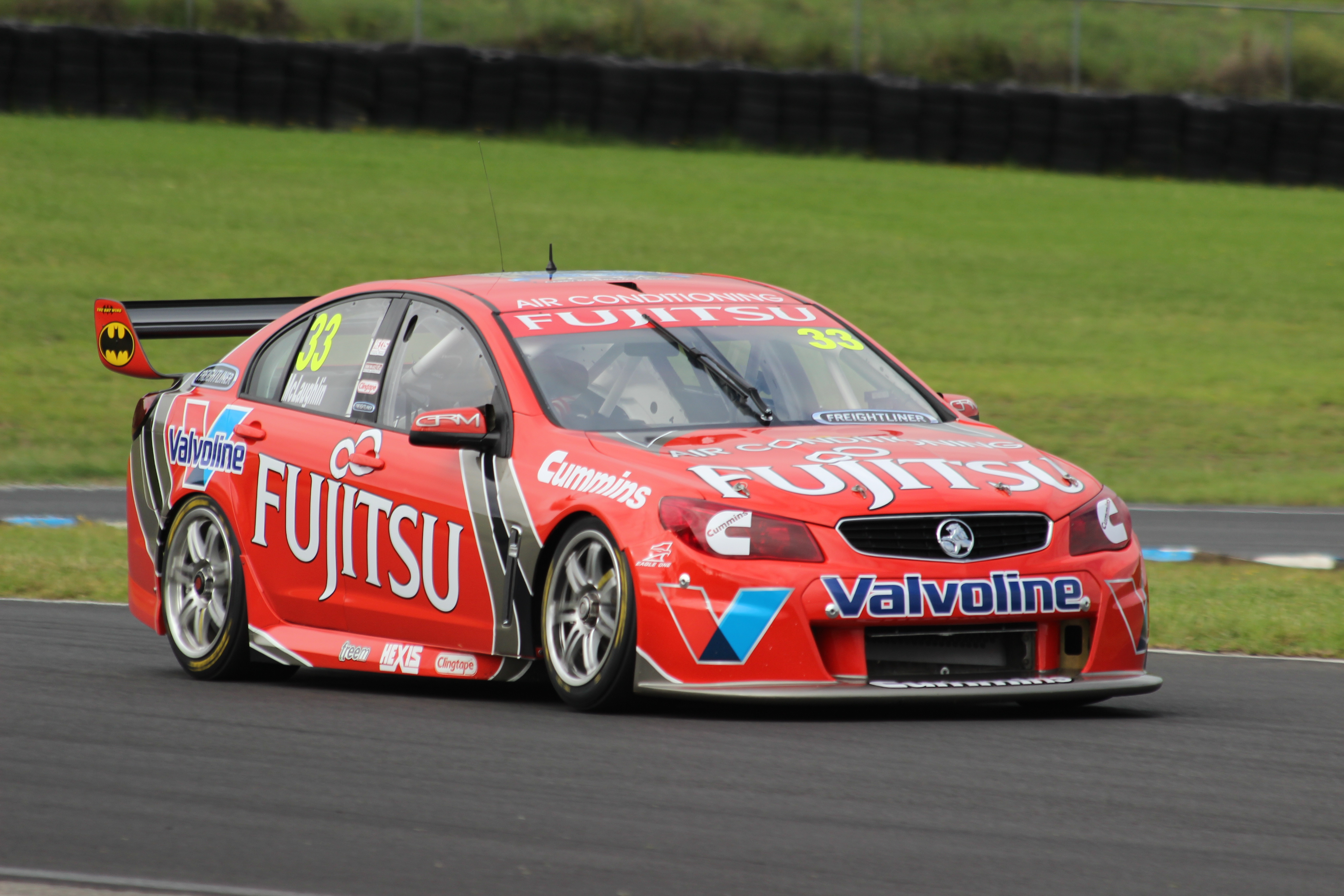
A Holden Commodore VF, driven by Scott McLaughlin.

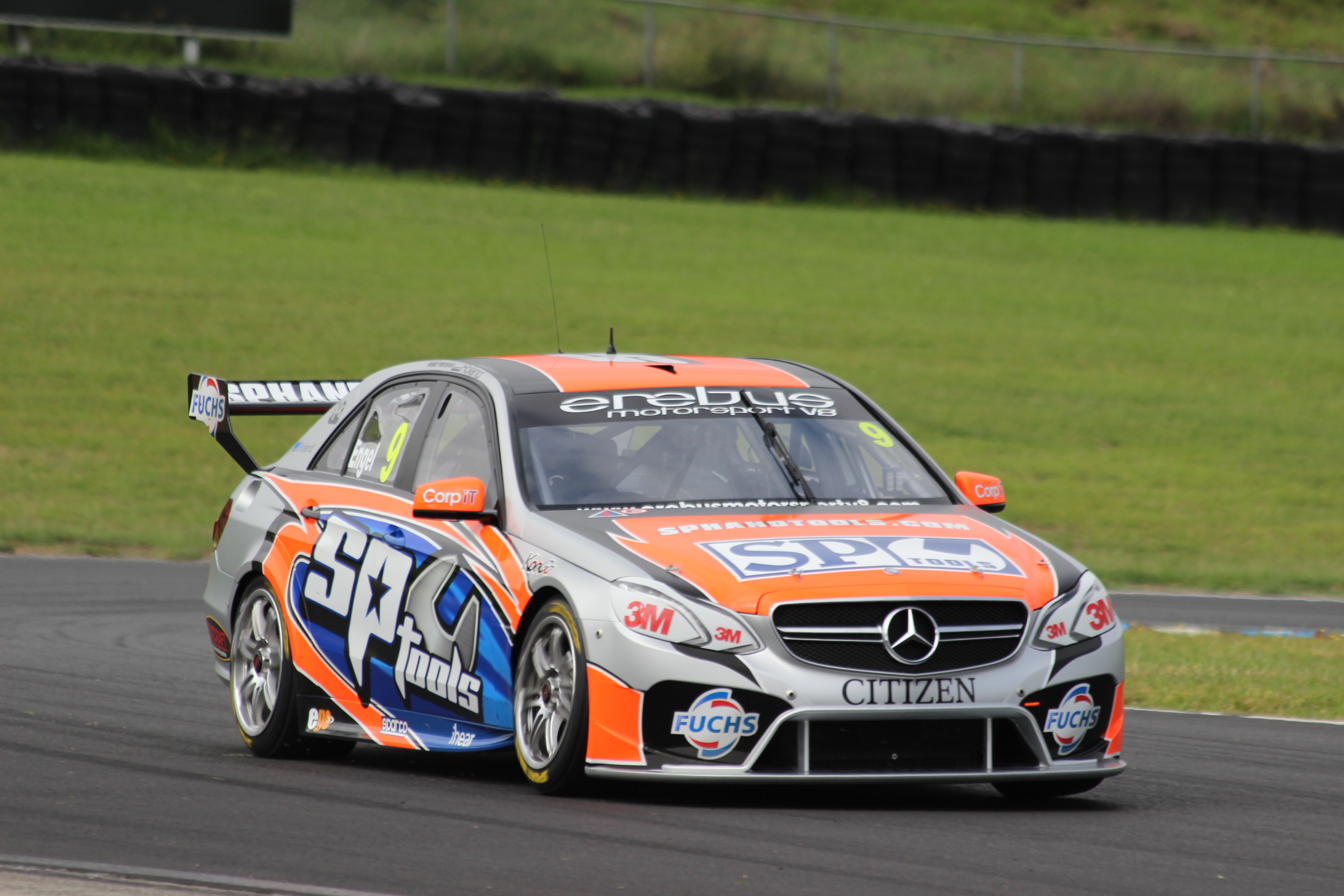
A Mercedes-Benz E63 AMG, driven by Maro Engel.

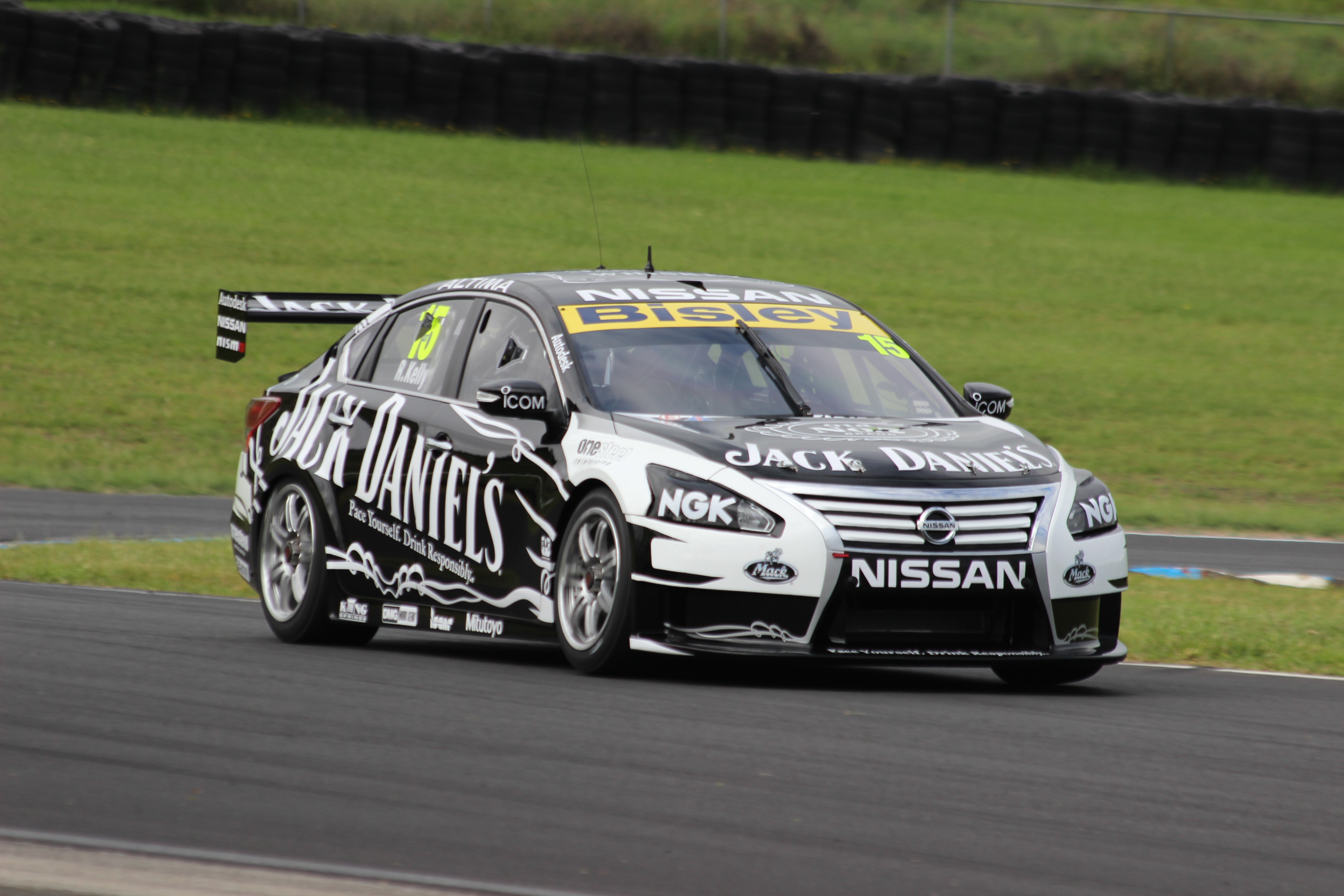
A Nissan Altima L33, driven by Rick Kelly.

=== New Generation V8 Supercar ===
The New Generation V8 Supercar (originally Car of the Future) project was first announced in 2008, when a working group was established to explore options for the long-term future of the category. The study found that in the fifteen years since the category had been restricted to two manufacturers, the costs of building and racing with a competitive car had doubled, with some estimates putting the cost as high as A$600,000 per car, per season.

The Car of the Future program was created to address this, aiming to reduce running costs to $250,000. This was achieved through the use of "control" parts; where teams had previously been charged with designing and developing their own parts, the Car of the Future regulations called for these parts to be built independently and to a set specification. The basic chassis and roll cage, differential, brakes, cooling and fuel systems and rear suspension were all changed to control parts.

The category also introduced a larger fuel tank to combat the phenomenon of "economy racing" whereby drivers would be forced to drive conservatively late in the race so as to preserve enough fuel to reach the finish. The larger tanks and a restructuring of event formats to include more compulsory pit stops instead allowed drivers to push as hard as they pleased until the end of the race.

Manufacturers were free to develop their own aerodynamic aids to suit their cars, which were then put through a rigorous system of parity testing so as to refine the aerodynamics of each model of car so as to prevent one model from having a distinct advantage over the others. Finally, manufacturers were also given the option of using "generic" engines developed by the category and re-badged to reflect the manufacturer using them—though as the season started, no manufacturers had elected to do so—or developing their own engines, which would be built to specifications and then be subject to a process of homologation to ensure that all engines developed by the manufacturer would be identical. In order to ensure the cars can remain competitive, the process of homologation only applies to the basic engine platform, which teams will be free to develop over the course of the season.

With the requirement that all teams build brand-new cars for the 2013 season, most of the cars that were raced in 2011 and 2012 were sold to teams competing in the V8 Development Series, the second-tier category for V8 Supercars.

In November 2013 the Car of the Future was officially renamed the New Generation V8 Supercar.

== Results and standings ==
=== Season summary ===
Round	Race	Event	Pole position	Fastest lap	Winning driver	Winning team	Report
1	1	Adelaide 500	(New Zealand) Shane van Gisbergen	(Australia) Mark Winterbottom	(Australia) Craig Lowndes	Triple Eight Race Engineering	report
1	2	Adelaide 500	(New Zealand) Shane van Gisbergen	(New Zealand) Shane van Gisbergen	(New Zealand) Shane van Gisbergen	Tekno Autosports	report
2	3	Tasmania 365	(Australia) Jamie Whincup	(New Zealand) Fabian Coulthard	(New Zealand) Fabian Coulthard	Brad Jones Racing	report
2	4	Tasmania 365	(Australia) Jason Bright	(Australia) Jason Bright	(Australia) Jason Bright	Brad Jones Racing	report
2	5	Tasmania 365	(Australia) Mark Winterbottom	(New Zealand) Fabian Coulthard	(New Zealand) Fabian Coulthard	Brad Jones Racing	report
3	6	Auckland 400	(Australia) Jamie Whincup	(Australia) Mark Winterbottom	(New Zealand) Scott McLaughlin	Garry Rogers Motorsport	report
3	7	Auckland 400	(New Zealand) Fabian Coulthard	(Australia) Mark Winterbottom	(Australia) Jamie Whincup	Triple Eight Race Engineering	report
3	8	Auckland 400	(Australia) Jamie Whincup	(Australia) Mark Winterbottom	(Australia) Will Davison	Ford Performance Racing	report
3	9	Auckland 400	(Australia) Jason Bright	(Australia) Jason Bright	(Australia) Jason Bright	Brad Jones Racing	report
4	10	Perth 360	(Australia) Jamie Whincup	(Australia) Craig Lowndes	(Australia) Craig Lowndes	Triple Eight Race Engineering	report
4	11	Perth 360	(Australia) Jason Bright	(Australia) Craig Lowndes	(Australia) Jamie Whincup	Triple Eight Race Engineering	report
4	12	Perth 360	(Australia) Jamie Whincup	(Australia) Jamie Whincup	(Australia) Jamie Whincup	Triple Eight Race Engineering	report
5	13	Austin 400	(New Zealand) Fabian Coulthard	(Australia) Jason Bright	(Australia) Jamie Whincup	Triple Eight Race Engineering	report
5	14	Austin 400	(Australia) Jamie Whincup	(New Zealand) Shane van Gisbergen	(Australia) Jamie Whincup	Triple Eight Race Engineering	report
5	15	Austin 400	(Australia) Jamie Whincup	(New Zealand) Fabian Coulthard	(New Zealand) Fabian Coulthard	Brad Jones Racing	report
5	16	Austin 400	(Australia) Jamie Whincup	(Australia) Jamie Whincup	(Australia) Jamie Whincup	Triple Eight Race Engineering	report
6	17	Darwin Triple Crown	(Australia) David Reynolds	(Australia) Jamie Whincup	(Australia) Jamie Whincup	Triple Eight Race Engineering	report
6	18	Darwin Triple Crown	(Australia) James Courtney	(New Zealand) Fabian Coulthard	(Australia) Mark Winterbottom	Ford Performance Racing	report
6	19	Darwin Triple Crown	(Australia) David Reynolds	(Australia) Craig Lowndes	(Australia) Craig Lowndes	Triple Eight Race Engineering	report
7	20	Townsville 400	(New Zealand) Shane van Gisbergen	(New Zealand) Shane van Gisbergen	(Australia) Will Davison	Ford Performance Racing	
7	21	Townsville 400	(Australia) Mark Winterbottom	(New Zealand) Shane van Gisbergen	(Australia) Garth Tander	Holden Racing Team	
8	22	Ipswich 360	(Australia) Jamie Whincup	(Australia) Mark Winterbottom	(Australia) Jamie Whincup	Triple Eight Race Engineering	
8	23	Ipswich 360	(Australia) Jamie Whincup	(New Zealand) Scott McLaughlin	(New Zealand) Scott McLaughlin	Garry Rogers Motorsport	
8	24	Ipswich 360	(Australia) Will Davison	(New Zealand) Scott McLaughlin	(Australia) Chaz Mostert	Dick Johnson Racing	
9	25	Winton 360	(Australia) Jamie Whincup	(Australia) Jason Bright	(Australia) James Moffat	Nissan Motorsport	
9	26	Winton 360	(Australia) Jason Bright	(Australia) Garth Tander	(Australia) Mark Winterbottom	Ford Performance Racing	
9	27	Winton 360	(Australia) James Courtney	(New Zealand) Shane van Gisbergen	(Australia) James Courtney	Holden Racing Team	
10	28	Sandown 500	(Australia) Will Davison (Australia) Steve Owen	(Australia) Jamie Whincup	(Australia) Jamie Whincup (Australia) Paul Dumbrell	Triple Eight Race Engineering	report
11	29	Bathurst 1000	(Australia) Jamie Whincup	(Australia) Garth Tander	(Australia) Mark Winterbottom (New Zealand) Steven Richards	Ford Performance Racing	report
12	30	Gold Coast 600	(Australia) Craig Lowndes	(Australia) Craig Lowndes	(Australia) Craig Lowndes (Australia) Warren Luff	Triple Eight Race Engineering	report
12	31	Gold Coast 600	(Australia) David Reynolds	(Australia) Garth Tander	(Australia) David Reynolds (Australia) Dean Canto	Rod Nash Racing	report
13	32	Phillip Island 360	(Australia) Mark Winterbottom	(Australia) Craig Lowndes	(Australia) Garth Tander	Holden Racing Team	
13	33	Phillip Island 360	(New Zealand) Fabian Coulthard	(Australia) Craig Lowndes	(Australia) Craig Lowndes	Triple Eight Race Engineering	
13	34	Phillip Island 360	(Australia) Mark Winterbottom	(Australia) Jamie Whincup	(Australia) Jamie Whincup	Triple Eight Race Engineering	
14	35	Sydney 500	(Australia) Jamie Whincup	(Australia) Jamie Whincup	(Australia) Jamie Whincup	Triple Eight Race Engineering	
14	36	Sydney 500	(New Zealand) Shane van Gisbergen	(New Zealand) Shane van Gisbergen	(New Zealand) Shane van Gisbergen	Tekno Autosports	

=== Points system ===
Points were awarded for each race at an event, to the driver/s of a car that completed at least 75% of the race distance and was running at the completion of the race, up to a maximum of 300 points per event.

Event format	Position, points per race																												
Event format	1st	2nd	3rd	4th	5th	6th	7th	8th	9th	10th	11th	12th	13th	14th	15th	16th	17th	18th	19th	20th	21st	22nd	23rd	24th	25th	26th	27th	28th	29th
Single-race	300	276	258	240	222	204	192	180	168	156	144	138	132	126	120	114	108	102	96	90	84	78	72	66	60	54	48	42	36
Two-race	150	138	129	120	111	102	96	90	84	78	72	69	66	63	60	57	54	51	48	45	42	39	36	33	30	27	24	21	—N/a
Three-race	100	92	86	80	74	68	64	60	56	52	48	46	44	42	40	38	36	34	32	30	28	26	24	22	20	18	16	14	—N/a
Four-race	75	69	64	60	55	51	48	45	42	39	36	34	33	31	30	28	27	25	24	22	21	19	18	16	15	13	12	10	—N/a

- Single-race events: Sandown 500, Bathurst 1000
- Two-race events: Adelaide 500, Townsville 400, Gold Coast 600, Sydney 500
- Three-race events: Tasmania 360, Perth 360, Darwin Triple Crown, Ipswich 360, Winton 360, Phillip Island 360
- Four-race events: Auckland 400, Austin 400

=== Drivers' championship ===
Pos.	Driver	No.	ADE (South Australia)		SYM (Tasmania)			PUK (New Zealand)				BAR (Western Australia)			COTA (United States)				HID (Northern Territory)			TOW (Queensland)		QLD (Queensland)			WIN (Victoria (state))			**SAN** **(Victoria (state))**	**BAT** **(New South Wales)**	**SUR** **(Queensland)**		PHI (Victoria (state))			SYD (New South Wales)		Pen.	Pts.
1	(Australia) Jamie Whincup	1	3	2	**2**	4	5	**26**	1	**24**	3	**2**	1	**1**	1	**1**	**3**	**1**	1	5	19	7	11	**1**	**2**	25	**Ret**	Ret	13	1	**2**	Ret	4	4	2	1	**1**	3	45	3094
2	(Australia) Craig Lowndes	888	1	3	26	10	11	3	16	4	9	1	8	2	2	2	2	5	26	3	1	4	7	4	12	6	21	12	10	2	3	**1**	8	8	1	3	15	5	70	2966
3	(Australia) Will Davison	6	2	6	6	5	6	7	2	1	5	14	5	4	4	9	12	Ret	Ret	4	7	1	10	6	9	**2**	6	7	6	**3**	7	6	9	17	8	6	5	7	25	2799
4	(Australia) Mark Winterbottom	5	Ret	5	3	6	**2**	19	13	23	24	3	3	12	8	6	7	6	22	1	2	2	**4**	3	10	3	4	1	17	6	1	3	18	**5**	7	**2**	Ret	6	0	2793
5	(New Zealand) Shane van Gisbergen	97	**Ret**	**1**	7	12	9	4	6	2	11	9	7	6	26	5	5	3	2	8	6	**17**	3	12	17	11	13	5	5	12	11	2	Ret	7	3	10	3	**1**	25	2508
6	(New Zealand) Fabian Coulthard	14	19	Ret	1	3	1	5	**10**	3	4	27	4	7	**3**	3	1	2	12	7	13	3	17	11	4	5	7	8	2	7	16	Ret	2	2	**5**	5	19	15	30	2501
7	(Australia) Jason Bright	8	22	Ret	4	**1**	4	2	4	6	**1**	4	**2**	3	12	21	8	7	8	13	10	5	16	7	5	7	3	**2**	Ret	24	5	DNS	15	24	23	4	4	2	15	2381
8	(Australia) Garth Tander	2	7	Ret	5	2	10	6	3	5	2	19	11	9	5	13	6	4	13	9	5	8	1	8	11	21	8	23	4	22	4	18	7	1	10	15	14	Ret	0	2322
9	(Australia) David Reynolds	55	20	Ret	14	Ret	24	8	5	7	8	7	12	5	11	11	16	13	**14**	10	**3**	11	26	Ret	8	4	10	6	7	17	9	8	**1**	22	9	12	11	4	0	2058
10	(New Zealand) Scott McLaughlin	33	6	9	8	8	8	1	24	Ret	DNS	12	14	13	28	7	11	27	11	27	8	14	9	2	1	20	19	9	14	8	8	22	23	19	19	11	Ret	12	0	1934
11	(Australia) James Courtney	22	5	7	9	7	3	9	Ret	22	6	8	6	17	9	14	10	10	3	**2**	Ret	6	2	5	3	23	5	3	**1**	5	Ret	Ret	Ret	Ret	DNS	DNS			15	1909
12	(Australia) Jonathon Webb	19	8	10	10	11	7	10	11	8	18	16	22	19	7	4	4	9	4	6	4	22	12	26	15	14	20	24	22	13	12	10	17	18	18	Ret	2	23	40	1901
13	(Australia) Alex Davison	18	9	Ret	13	15	12	11	15	9	7	5	9	16	14	17	18	26	20	20	Ret	9	18	9	7	22	15	18	12	15	13	20	13	3	6	9	12	8	15	1812
14	(Australia) Rick Kelly	15	11	14	20	23	16	12	7	10	15	26	16	18	6	8	9	8	5	25	12	12	20	13	21	9	14	22	Ret	16	19	11	6	20	13	8	9	18	0	1754
15	(Australia) Russell Ingall	66	10	4	15	18	26	14	14	11	13	23	21	Ret	24	18	22	22	23	26	16	Ret	5	14	20	Ret	9	Ret	DNS	9	17	5	3	13	15	Ret	22	10	25	1556
16	(Australia) Tony D'Alberto	3	12	8	12	13	25	16	20	Ret	17	24	18	22	18	25	26	21	9	18	14	25	6	21	18	13	11	4	21	23	24	4	21	12	Ret	Ret	6	14	15	1526
17	(Australia) Chaz Mostert	12										15	15	10	13	19	13	15	7	17	17	10	13	23	6	1	16	13	3	14	21	9	11	9	4	Ret	21	9	0	1520
18	(Australia) James Moffat	360	14	13	19	20	15	22	9	13	10	10	10	8	16	10	17	14	15	23	Ret	15	14	10	23	12	1	11	8	26	18	Ret	Ret	Ret	21	7	20	Ret	15	1448
19	(France) Alexandre Prémat	34	4	Ret	21	21	14	Ret	8	21	12	6	19	11	17	12	28	11	21	15	Ret	13	19	20	14	26	17	Ret	11	10	23	14	14	Ret	DNS	DNS	13	16	30	1376
20	(Australia) Lee Holdsworth	4	17	17	23	17	13	18	25	17	22	18	Ret	14	27	20	21	20	18	16	Ret	Ret	Ret	Ret	Ret	18	26	20	20	4	14	12	5	14	17	Ret	23	13	0	1361
21	(Australia) David Wall	21	16	16	11	Ret	19	21	17	19	19	22	24	Ret	10	Ret	19	12	19	14	Ret	21	25	18	16	24	23	10	18	19	22	7	12	11	14	17	16	22	0	1346
22	(Australia) Tim Slade	47	15	Ret	22	22	18	25	26	16	23	13	23	24	22	26	20	17	6	11	Ret	Ret	8	24	13	8	22	19	15	21	26	15	20	25	24	20	8	11	0	1298
23	(Australia) Michael Caruso	36	23	Ret	16	19	17	13	12	14	16	11	25	Ret	20	15	15	24	10	21	11	18	22	25	24	16	2	Ret	Ret	20	25	Ret	10	10	Ret	Ret	7	19	15	1233
24	(Australia) Dean Fiore	88	21	12	25	9	21	20	19	12	Ret	17	13	15	21	23	23	18	24	19	Ret	20	24	17	26	15	25	16	16	18	Ret	16	19	23	20	18	17	21	0	1211
25	(Australia) Todd Kelly	7	Ret	Ret	Ret	16	Ret	17	18	15	14	20	17	21	25	16	14	19	17	12	20	16	15	15	22	10	24	14	Ret	11	Ret	17	Ret	16	16	13	10	17	65	1139
26	(Australia) Tim Blanchard	17	18	15	17	26	22	15	23	Ret	20	21	20	23	19	24	27	23	Ret	24	15	23	23	16	19	Ret	27	21	9	Ret	15	19	16	6	12	16	Ret	Ret	15	1080
27	(Australia) Scott Pye	80	13	11	18	14	Ret					28	27	20	15	22	25	16	25	28	18	24	21	22	25	19	12	15	Ret	Ret	6	13	Ret	15	11	14	Ret	Ret	25	1049
28	(Germany) Maro Engel	9	24	Ret	Ret	24	23	24	21	20	21	25	26	Ret	23	Ret	24	25	16	22	9	19	27	19	27	17	18	17	19	25	20	21	22	21	22	19	Ret	20	152	836
29	(Australia) Warren Luff	888																												2	3	1	8						0	774
30	(Australia) Paul Dumbrell	1																												1	2	Ret	4						0	696
31	(New Zealand) Steven Richards	5																												6	1	3	18						0	684
32	(Australia) Steve Owen	6																												**3**	7	6	9						0	636
33	(Australia) Nick Percat	2/22																												22	4	18	7				18	24	0	549
34	(New Zealand) Craig Baird	4																												4	14	12	5						0	546
35	(Australia) Dean Canto	55																												17	9	8	1						0	516
36	(Australia) Ryan Briscoe	66																												9	17	5	3						0	516
37	(New Zealand) Jonny Reid	12/3	Ret	Ret	24	25	20	23	22	18	25																			23	24	4	21						0	449
38	(Australia) Luke Youlden	14																												7	16	Ret	2						0	444
39	(Australia) Jack Perkins	33																												8	8	22	23						0	435
40	(Netherlands) Jeroen Bleekemolen	97																												12	11	2	Ret						0	420
41	(Germany) Marc Lieb	19																												13	12	10	17						0	402
42	(Australia) Karl Reindler	15																												16	19	11	6						0	384
43	(Australia) Dale Wood	12																												14	21	9	11						0	366
44	(New Zealand) John McIntyre	18																												15	13	20	13						0	363
45	(Australia) Greg Ritter	34																												10	23	14	14						0	354
46	(Australia) Andrew Jones	8																												24	5	DNS	15						0	348
47	(New Zealand) Chris Pither	21																												19	22	7	12						0	339
48	(Australia) Paul Morris	80																												Ret	6	13	Ret						0	270
49	(Australia) Steven Johnson	9																												25	20	21	22						0	231
50	(New Zealand) Daniel Gaunt	36																												20	25	Ret	10						0	228
51	(Australia) Ashley Walsh	17																												Ret	15	19	16						0	225
52	(New Zealand) Greg Murphy	22																												5	Ret	Ret	Ret						0	222
53	(New Zealand) Matt Halliday	88																												18	Ret	16	19						0	207
54	(Australia) David Russell	7																												11	Ret	17	Ret						0	198
55	(United Kingdom) Andy Priaulx	10																													10								0	156
55	(Sweden) Mattias Ekström	10																													10								0	156
57	(Australia) Taz Douglas	360																												26	18	Ret	Ret						0	156
58	(Australia) Andrew Thompson	47																												21	26								0	138
59	(Australia) David Brabham	47																														15	20						0	105
Pos.	Driver	No.	ADE (South Australia)		SYM (Tasmania)			PUK (New Zealand)				BAR (Western Australia)			COTA (United States)				HID (Northern Territory)			TOW (Queensland)		QLD (Queensland)			WIN (Victoria (state))			**SAN** **(Victoria (state))**	**BAT** **(New South Wales)**	**SUR** **(Queensland)**		PHI (Victoria (state))			SYD (New South Wales)		Pen.	Pts.

Colour	Result
Gold	Winner
Silver	Second place
Bronze	Third place
Green	Points classification
Blue	Non-points classification
Blue	Non-classified finish (NC)
Purple	Retired, not classified (Ret)
Red	Did not qualify (DNQ)
Red	Did not pre-qualify (DNPQ)
Black	Disqualified (DSQ)
White	Did not start (DNS)
White	Withdrew (WD)
White	Race cancelled (C)
Blank	Did not practice (DNP)
Blank	Did not arrive (DNA)
Blank	Excluded (EX)

Bold – Pole position
Italics – Fastest lap

Results count toward the Endurance Cup.

=== Teams' championship ===
Pos.	Team	No.	ADE (South Australia)		SYM (Tasmania)			PUK (New Zealand)				BAR (Western Australia)			COTA (United States)				HID (Northern Territory)			TOW (Queensland)		QLD (Queensland)			WIN (Victoria (state))			**SAN** **(Victoria (state))**	**BAT** **(New South Wales)**	**SUR** **(Queensland)**		PHI (Victoria (state))			SYD (New South Wales)		Pen.	Pts.
1	Triple Eight Race Engineering	1	3	2	**2**	4	5	**26**	1	**24**	3	**2**	1	**1**	1	**1**	**3**	**1**	1	5	19	7	11	**1**	**2**	25	**Ret**	Ret	13	1	**2**	Ret	4	4	2	1	**1**	3	75	6100
1	Triple Eight Race Engineering	888	1	3	26	10	11	3	16	4	9	1	8	2	2	2	2	5	26	3	1	4	7	4	12	6	21	12	10	2	3	**1**	8	8	1	3	15	5	75	6100
2	Ford Performance Racing	5	Ret	5	3	6	**2**	19	13	23	24	3	3	12	8	6	7	6	22	1	2	2	**4**	3	10	3	4	1	17	6	1	3	18	**5**	7	**2**	Ret	6	0	5617
2	Ford Performance Racing	6	2	6	6	5	6	7	2	1	5	14	5	4	4	9	12	Ret	Ret	4	7	1	10	6	9	**2**	6	7	6	**3**	7	6	9	17	8	6	5	7	0	5617
3	Brad Jones Racing	8	22	Ret	4	**1**	4	2	4	6	**1**	4	**2**	3	12	21	8	7	8	13	10	5	16	7	5	7	3	**2**	Ret	24	5	DNS	15	24	23	4	4	2	0	4927
3	Brad Jones Racing	14	19	Ret	1	3	1	5	**10**	3	4	27	4	7	**3**	3	1	2	12	7	13	3	17	11	4	5	7	8	2	7	16	Ret	2	2	**5**	5	19	15	0	4927
4	Tekno Autosports	19	8	10	10	11	7	10	11	8	18	16	22	19	7	4	4	9	4	6	4	22	12	26	15	14	20	24	22	13	12	10	17	18	18	Ret	2	23	0	4474
4	Tekno Autosports	97	**Ret**	**1**	7	12	9	4	6	2	11	9	7	6	26	5	5	3	2	8	6	**17**	3	12	17	11	13	5	5	12	11	2	Ret	7	3	10	3	**1**	0	4474
5	Holden Racing Team	2	7	Ret	5	2	10	6	3	5	2	19	11	9	5	13	6	4	13	9	5	8	1	8	11	21	8	23	4	22	4	18	7	1	10	15	14	Ret	0	4330
5	Holden Racing Team	22	5	7	9	7	3	9	Ret	22	6	8	6	17	9	14	10	10	3	**2**	Ret	6	2	5	3	23	5	3	**1**	5	Ret	Ret	Ret	Ret	DNS	DNS	18	24	0	4330
6	Garry Rogers Motorsport	33	6	9	8	8	8	1	24	Ret	DNS	12	14	13	28	7	11	27	11	27	8	14	9	2	1	20	19	9	14	8	8	22	23	19	19	11	Ret	12	0	3340
6	Garry Rogers Motorsport	34	4	Ret	21	21	14	Ret	8	21	12	6	19	11	17	12	28	11	21	15	Ret	13	19	20	14	26	17	Ret	11	10	23	14	14	Ret	DNS	DNS	13	16	0	3340
7	Nissan Motorsport	7	Ret	Ret	Ret	16	Ret	17	18	15	14	20	17	21	25	16	14	19	17	12	20	16	15	15	22	10	24	14	Ret	11	Ret	17	Ret	16	16	13	10	17	0	2958
7	Nissan Motorsport	15	11	14	20	23	16	12	7	10	15	26	16	18	6	8	9	8	5	25	12	12	20	13	21	9	14	22	Ret	16	19	11	6	20	13	8	9	18	0	2958
8	Dick Johnson Racing	12	Ret	Ret	24	25	20	23	22	18	25	15	15	10	13	19	13	15	7	17	17	10	13	23	6	1	16	13	3	14	21	9	11	9	4	Ret	21	9	0	2764
8	Dick Johnson Racing	17	18	15	17	26	22	15	23	Ret	20	21	20	23	19	24	27	23	Ret	24	15	23	23	16	19	Ret	27	21	9	Ret	15	19	16	6	12	16	Ret	Ret	0	2764
9	Nissan Motorsport	36	23	Ret	16	19	17	13	12	14	16	11	25	Ret	20	15	15	24	10	21	11	18	22	25	24	16	2	Ret	Ret	20	25	Ret	10	10	Ret	Ret	7	19	0	2711
9	Nissan Motorsport	360	14	13	19	20	15	22	9	13	10	10	10	8	16	10	17	14	15	23	Ret	15	14	10	23	12	1	11	8	26	18	Ret	Ret	Ret	21	7	20	Ret	0	2711
10	Lucas Dumbrell Motorsport	80	13	11	18	14	Ret					28	27	20	15	22	25	16	25	28	18	24	21	22	25	19	12	15	Ret	Ret	6	13	Ret	15	11	14	Ret	Ret	0	2285
10	Lucas Dumbrell Motorsport	88	21	12	25	9	21	20	19	12	Ret	17	13	15	21	23	23	18	24	19	Ret	20	24	17	26	15	25	16	16	18	Ret	16	19	23	20	18	17	21	0	2285
11	Erebus Motorsport	4	17	17	23	17	13	18	25	17	22	18	Ret	14	27	20	21	20	18	16	Ret	Ret	Ret	Ret	Ret	18	26	20	20	4	14	12	5	14	17	Ret	23	13	102	2247
11	Erebus Motorsport	9	24	Ret	Ret	24	23	24	21	20	21	25	26	Ret	23	Ret	24	25	16	22	9	19	27	19	27	17	18	17	19	25	20	21	22	21	22	19	Ret	20	102	2247
12	Rod Nash Racing	55	20	Ret	14	Ret	24	8	5	7	8	7	12	5	11	11	16	13	**14**	10	**3**	11	26	Ret	8	4	10	6	7	17	9	8	**1**	22	9	12	11	4	0	2058
13	Charlie Schwerkolt Racing	18	9	Ret	13	15	12	11	15	9	7	5	9	16	14	17	18	26	20	20	Ret	9	18	9	7	22	15	18	12	15	13	20	13	3	6	9	12	8	0	1827
14	Tony D'Alberto Racing	3	12	8	12	13	25	16	20	Ret	17	24	18	22	18	25	26	21	9	18	14	25	6	21	18	13	11	4	21	23	24	4	21	12	Ret	Ret	6	14	0	1541
15	Walkinshaw Racing	66	10	4	15	18	26	14	14	11	13	23	21	Ret	24	18	22	22	23	26	16	Ret	5	14	20	Ret	9	Ret	DNS	9	17	5	3	13	15	Ret	22	10	62	1519
16	Britek Motorsport	21	16	16	11	Ret	19	21	17	19	19	22	24	Ret	10	Ret	19	12	19	14	Ret	21	25	18	16	24	23	10	18	19	22	7	12	11	14	17	16	22	0	1346
17	James Rosenberg Racing	47	15	Ret	22	22	18	25	26	16	23	13	23	24	22	26	20	17	6	11	Ret	Ret	8	24	13	8	22	19	15	21	26	15	20	25	24	20	8	11	0	1298
18	Triple Eight Race Engineering (w)	10																													10								0	156
Pos.	Team	No.	ADE (South Australia)		SYM (Tasmania)			PUK (New Zealand)				BAR (Western Australia)			COTA (United States)				HID (Northern Territory)			TOW (Queensland)		QLD (Queensland)			WIN (Victoria (state))			**SAN** **(Victoria (state))**	**BAT** **(New South Wales)**	**SUR** **(Queensland)**		PHI (Victoria (state))			SYD (New South Wales)		Pen.	Pts.

Colour	Result
Gold	Winner
Silver	Second place
Bronze	Third place
Green	Points classification
Blue	Non-points classification
Blue	Non-classified finish (NC)
Purple	Retired, not classified (Ret)
Red	Did not qualify (DNQ)
Red	Did not pre-qualify (DNPQ)
Black	Disqualified (DSQ)
White	Did not start (DNS)
White	Withdrew (WD)
White	Race cancelled (C)
Blank	Did not practice (DNP)
Blank	Did not arrive (DNA)
Blank	Excluded (EX)

Bold - Pole position
Italics - Fastest lap

Results count towards the Endurance Cup.

- (w) - denotes wildcard entry

=== Enduro Cup ===
Pos.	Drivers	No.	**SAN** **(Victoria (state))**	**BAT** **(New South Wales)**	**SUR** **(Queensland)**		Pen.	Pts.
1	Craig Lowndes / Warren Luff	888	2	3	**1**	8	0	774
2	Jamie Whincup / Paul Dumbrell	1	1	**2**	Ret	4	0	696
3	Mark Winterbottom / Steven Richards	5	6	1	3	18	0	684
4	Will Davison / Steve Owen	6	**3**	7	6	9	0	636
5	Lee Holdsworth / Craig Baird	4	4	14	12	5	0	546
6	David Reynolds / Dean Canto	55	17	9	8	**1**	0	516
7	Russell Ingall / Ryan Briscoe	66	9	17	5	3	0	516
8	Garth Tander / Nick Percat	2	22	4	18	7	0	465
9	Fabian Coulthard / Luke Youlden	14	7	16	Ret	2	0	444
10	Scott McLaughlin / Jack Perkins	33	8	8	22	23	0	435
11	Shane van Gisbergen / Jeroen Bleekemolen	97	12	11	2	Ret	0	420
12	Rick Kelly / Karl Reindler	15	16	19	11	6	0	384
13	Jonathon Webb / Marc Lieb	19	13	12	10	17	25	377
14	Chaz Mostert / Dale Wood	12	14	21	9	11	0	366
15	Alex Davison / John McIntyre	18	15	13	20	13	0	363
16	Alexandre Prémat / Greg Ritter	34	10	23	14	14	0	354
17	Jason Bright / Andrew Jones	8	24	5	DNS	15	0	348
18	David Wall / Chris Pither	21	19	22	7	12	0	339
19	Tony D'Alberto / Jonny Reid	3	23	24	4	21	0	300
20	Scott Pye / Paul Morris	80	Ret	6	13	Ret	0	270
21	Tim Slade / Andrew Thompson / David Brabham	47	21	26	15	20	0	243
22	Maro Engel / Steven Johnson	9	25	20	21	22	0	231
23	Michael Caruso / Daniel Gaunt	36	20	25	Ret	10	0	228
24	Tim Blanchard / Ashley Walsh	17	Ret	15	19	16	0	225
25	James Courtney / Greg Murphy	22	5	Ret	Ret	Ret	0	222
26	Dean Fiore / Matt Halliday	88	18	Ret	16	19	0	207
27	Todd Kelly / David Russell	7	11	Ret	17	Ret	0	198
28	Andy Priaulx / Mattias Ekström	10		10			0	156
29	James Moffat / Taz Douglas	360	26	18	Ret	Ret	0	156
Pos.	Drivers	No.	**SAN** **(Victoria (state))**	**BAT** **(New South Wales)**	**SUR** **(Queensland)**		Pen.	Pts.

Colour	Result
Gold	Winner
Silver	Second place
Bronze	Third place
Green	Points classification
Blue	Non-points classification
Blue	Non-classified finish (NC)
Purple	Retired, not classified (Ret)
Red	Did not qualify (DNQ)
Red	Did not pre-qualify (DNPQ)
Black	Disqualified (DSQ)
White	Did not start (DNS)
White	Withdrew (WD)
White	Race cancelled (C)
Blank	Did not practice (DNP)
Blank	Did not arrive (DNA)
Blank	Excluded (EX)

Bold - Pole position
Italics - Fastest lap

== See also ==
- V8 Supercars
- 2013 V8 Supercar season
- 2013 Dunlop V8 Supercar Series
