= Austin 400 =

(United States) Austin 400

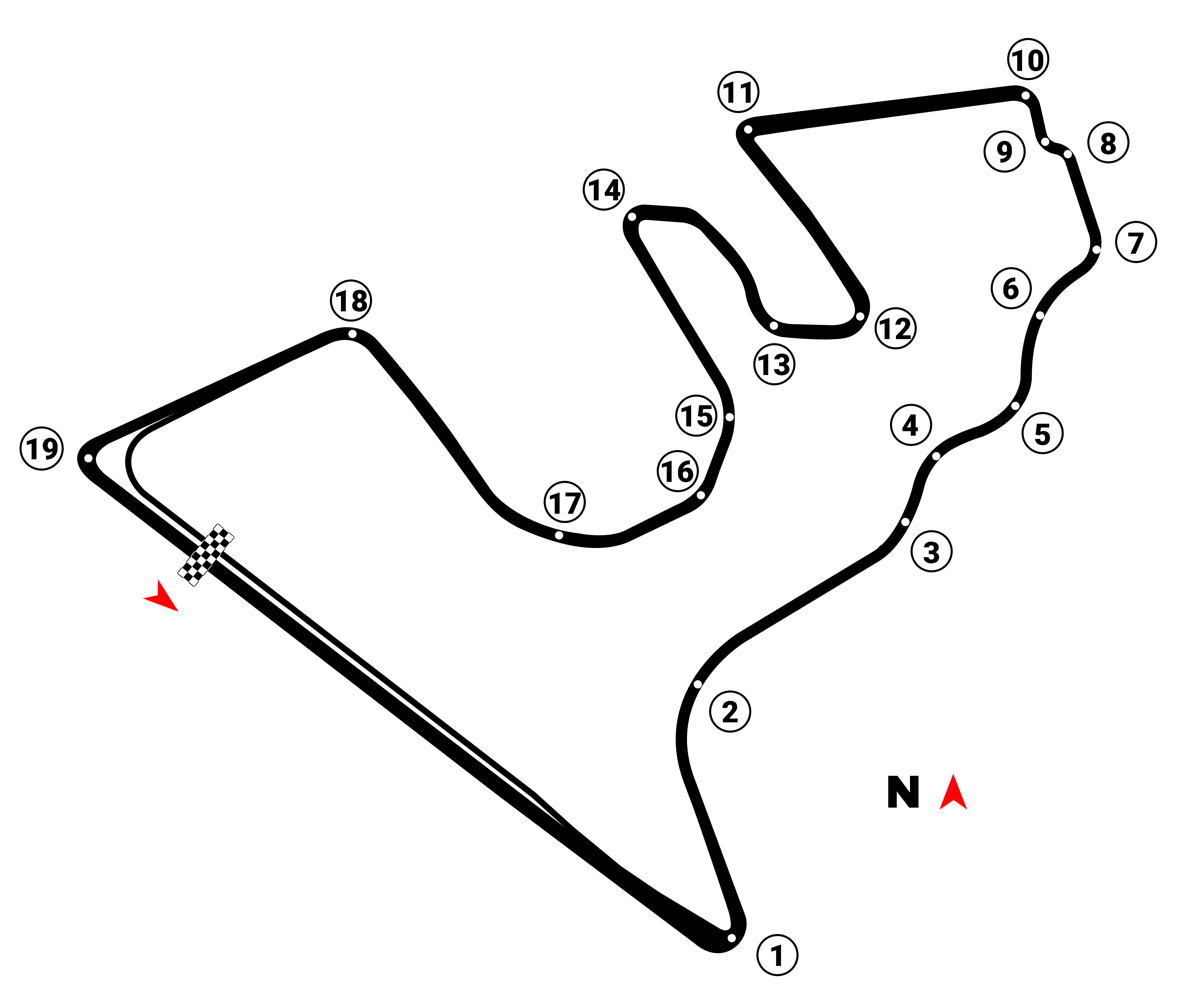
- Race Information
Venue	Circuit of the Americas
Number of times held	1
First held	2013
Last held	2013
- Race Format
- Race 1
Laps	27
Distance	100 km
- Race 2
Laps	27
Distance	100 km
- Race 3
Laps	27
Distance	100 km
- Race 4
Laps	27
Distance	100 km
- Last Event (2013)
- Overall Winner
(Australia) Jamie Whincup	Triple Eight Race Engineering
- Race Winners
(Australia) Jamie Whincup	Triple Eight Race Engineering
(Australia) Jamie Whincup	Triple Eight Race Engineering
(New Zealand) Fabian Coulthard	Brad Jones Racing
(Australia) Jamie Whincup	Triple Eight Race Engineering

The Austin 400 was a motor racing event for V8 Supercars that took place at the Circuit of the Americas in Travis County near Austin, Texas, United States of America in 2013.

== History ==
Its inaugural running took place between 17 and 19 May 2013, as the fifth round of the 2013 International V8 Supercars Championship. The race marked the category's first event in the United States, and featured four races of 100 km (62 mi).

== Demise ==
The race was not held in 2014 due to the track hosting the X Games; regarding the scheduling conflict, V8 Supercar chief executive James Warburton stated, "The timing of COTA securing the X Games next year led to the mutual agreement of a gap-year before consolidating, planning and returning to Texas in 2015."

On 28 August 2014, it was announced that V8 Supercars and the Circuit of the Americas had agreed to terminate the current contract. It is unlikely that V8 Supercars will return to the US for the foreseeable future.

== Winners ==
Year	Driver	Team	Car	Report
2013	(Australia) Jamie Whincup	Triple Eight Race Engineering	Holden Commodore (VF)	Report

== See also ==
- List of Australian Touring Car Championship races
