= 2013 Chill Perth 360 =

2013 V8 Supercar championship race

(Western Australia) 2013 Chill Perth 360
Event Information
- Round 4 of 14 in the 2013 International V8 Supercars Championship
- Date: 3–5 May 2013
- Location: Perth, Western Australia
- Venue: Barbagallo Raceway
- Weather: Fine

Results
Race 1
Distance	50 laps	120 km
Pole position	Jamie Whincup; Triple Eight Race Engineering	55.3985
Winner	Craig Lowndes; Triple Eight Race Engineering	1:13:05.0887
Race 2
Distance	42 laps	100 km
Pole position	Jason Bright; Brad Jones Racing	55.2901
Winner	Jamie Whincup; Triple Eight Race Engineering	43:38.5140
Race 3
Distance	42 laps	100 km
Pole position	Jamie Whincup; Triple Eight Race Engineering	55.2455
Winner	Jamie Whincup; Triple Eight Race Engineering	46:16.0085

The 2013 Chill Perth 360 was a motor race meeting for the Australasian sedan-based V8 Supercars. It was the fourth event of the 2013 International V8 Supercars Championship. Three races were held during the race meeting.

This round saw Chaz Mostert make his main game debut, graduating from the development series as Ford Performance Racing loaned him to Dick Johnson Racing to replace Jonny Reid. Triple Eight Race Engineering dominated the event, taking all three race wins. Craig Lowndes won the 60/60 Sprint race on Saturday with team-mate Jamie Whincup winning the remaining two races on Sunday.

== Championship standings after the race ==
- After 12 of 36 races.

Drivers' Championship standings

	Pos.	Driver	Points
1	1	Jamie Whincup	958
1	2	Will Davison	893
	3	Craig Lowndes	843
2	4	Jason Bright	797
2	5	Shane van Gisbergen	720

Teams' Championship standings

Pos.	Constructor	Points
1	Triple Eight Race Engineering	1741
2	Ford Performance Racing	1559
3	Brad Jones Racing	1524
4	Holden Racing Team	1378
5	Tekno Autosports	1293

- Note: Only the top five positions are included for both sets of standings.

Supercars Championship
Previous race: 2013 ITM 400 Auckland	2013 Supercars Championship	Next race: 2013 Austin 400
Previous year: 2012 Trading Post Perth Challenge	Perth 360	Next year: 2014 Perth 400
