= 2013 Skycity Triple Crown =

2013 V8 Supercar championship race

(Northern Territory) 2013 Skycity Triple Crown
Event Information
- Round 6 of 14 in the 2013 International V8 Supercars Championship
- Date: 14–16 June 2013
- Location: Darwin, Northern Territory
- Venue: Hidden Valley Raceway
- Weather: Fine

Results
Race 1
Distance	42 laps	120 km
Pole position	David Reynolds; Rod Nash Racing	1:09.5034
Winner	Jamie Whincup; Triple Eight Race Engineering	1:18:55.3674
Race 2
Distance	35 laps	100 km
Pole position	James Courtney; Holden Racing Team	1:08.5384
Winner	Mark Winterbottom; Ford Performance Racing	42:28.7457
Race 3
Distance	24 laps	70 km
Pole position	David Reynolds; Rod Nash Racing	1:08.2382
Winner	Craig Lowndes; Triple Eight Race Engineering	31:39.6940

The 2013 Skycity Triple Crown was a motor race meeting for the Australasian sedan-based V8 Supercars. It was the sixth event of the 2013 International V8 Supercars Championship. Three races were held during the race meeting.

Jamie Whincup of Triple Eight Race Engineering continued his recent form by winning the 60/60 Sprint race on Saturday. His luck would turn on Sunday, however, with a drive-through penalty in the final race dropping him to nineteenth. David Reynolds, driving for Rod Nash Racing, showed good pace, taking two pole positions, though his best result would only be a third place in the third race. Ford Performance Racing's Mark Winterbottom scored his first win of the season in the second race while Whincup's team-mate Craig Lowndes won the third race.

The Holden Racing Team's James Courtney found form, taking a pole position and two podium finishes before retiring in the final race. The event also saw the best finishes for both Nissan and Mercedes-Benz, with Rick Kelly and Tim Slade finishing fifth and sixth respectively in the 60/60 Sprint race. German driver Maro Engel also scored his best result, with a ninth place in the third race, which was marred by a multi-car crash on the first lap which eliminated seven cars and caused the race to be shortened by eleven laps.

== Championship standings after the race ==
- After 16 of 36 races.

Drivers' Championship standings

	Pos.	Driver	Points
	1	Jamie Whincup	1423
	2	Craig Lowndes	1264
	3	Will Davison	1148
2	4	Shane van Gisbergen	1127
1	5	Fabian Coulthard	1108

Teams' Championship standings

	Pos.	Constructor	Points
	1	Triple Eight Race Engineering	2702
	2	Brad Jones Racing	2254
	3	Ford Performance Racing	2252
1	4	Tekno Autosports	2138
1	5	Holden Racing Team	2080

- Note: Only the top five positions are included for both sets of standings.
