= 2013 Austin 400 =

Motor race event

(United States) 2013 Austin 400
Event Information
- Round 5 of 14 in the 2013 International V8 Supercars Championship
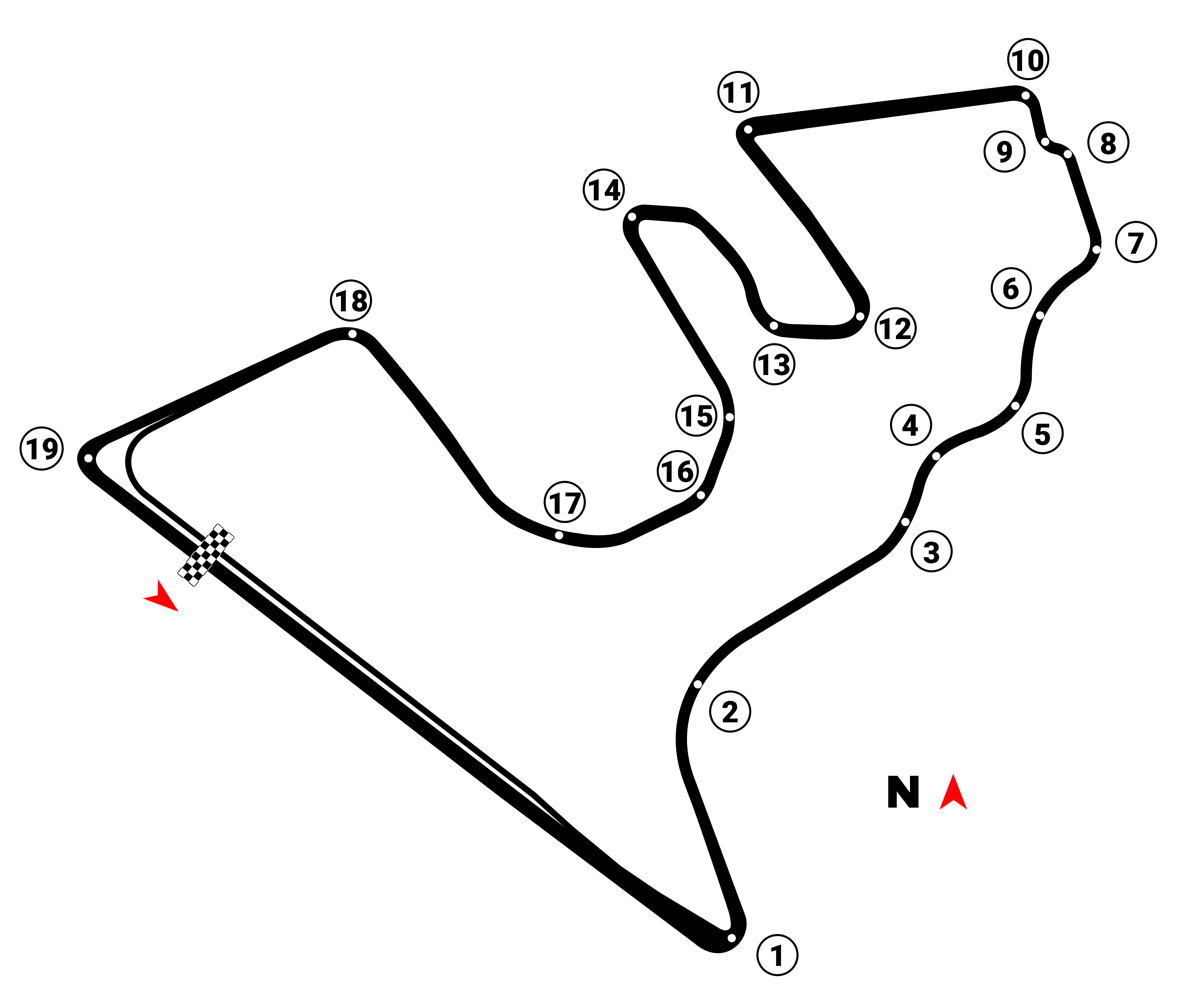
- Date: 17–19 May 2013
- Location: Austin, Texas, United States
- Venue: Circuit of the Americas
- Weather: Fine

Results
Race 1
Distance	27 laps	100 km
Pole position	Fabian Coulthard; Brad Jones Racing	1:32.5934
Winner	Jamie Whincup; Triple Eight Race Engineering	44:20.8482
Race 2
Distance	27 laps	100 km
Pole position	Jamie Whincup; Triple Eight Race Engineering	1:32.0311
Winner	Jamie Whincup; Triple Eight Race Engineering	43:16.6491
Race 3
Distance	27 laps	100 km
Pole position	Jamie Whincup; Triple Eight Race Engineering	1:32.1034
Winner	Fabian Coulthard; Brad Jones Racing	45:24.8159
Race 4
Distance	27 laps	100 km
Pole position	Jamie Whincup; Triple Eight Race Engineering	1:31.9948
Winner	Jamie Whincup; Triple Eight Race Engineering	47:20.7325

The 2013 Austin 400 was a motor race meeting for the Australasian sedan-based V8 Supercars. It was the fifth event of the 2013 International V8 Supercars Championship. Four races were held during the race meeting. It was the first V8 Supercar event to be held in North America.

Jamie Whincup, driving for Triple Eight Race Engineering, dominated the event, continuing his strong form from the previous round at Barbagallo Raceway. Whincup won three of the four races and scored three pole positions. Brad Jones Racing's Fabian Coulthard was the only driver to beat Whincup, taking one pole position and one race win.

The event took place on a short version of the Circuit of the Americas, 2.3 mi (3.7 km) long instead of 3.426 mi (5.513 km).

== Championship standings after the race ==
- After 16 of 36 races.

Drivers' Championship standings

	Pos.	Driver	Points
	1	Jamie Whincup	1217
1	2	Craig Lowndes	1075
1	3	Will Davison	1004
2	4	Fabian Coulthard	954
1	5	Jason Bright	945

Teams' Championship standings

	Pos.	Constructor	Points
	1	Triple Eight Race Engineering	2292
1	2	Brad Jones Racing	1944
1	3	Ford Performance Racing	1890
	4	Holden Racing Team	1728
	5	Tekno Autosports	1690

- Note: Only the top five positions are included for both sets of standings.
