= 2009 Australian Drivers' Championship =

Motor racing competition

Seasons
- ← 2008 2010 →

The 2009 Australian Drivers' Championship was a CAMS sanctioned national motor racing title with the championship winner receiving the 2009 CAMS Gold Star award. The 2009 championship was the 53rd Australian Drivers' Championship and the fifth to be contested with open wheel racing cars constructed in accordance with FIA Formula 3 regulations. The season began on 19 March 2009 at the Adelaide Street Circuit and finished on 29 November at Sandown Raceway after eight events across four different states with two rounds per event. Team BRM driver Joey Foster became the second successive champion from Great Britain, holding off 2007 series champion Tim Macrow by eight points. In the National classes, Tom Tweedie was champion in National A, recording three top-three overall finishes and twelve class wins, while Peter Kalpakiotis was champion in National B as he was the only driver to contest more than one meeting.

== Class structure ==
Drivers compete in three classes:

- Australian Formula 3 Championship – for cars constructed in accordance with the FIA Formula 3 regulations that applied between 1 January 2002 and 31 December 2007
- Formula 3 National A – for cars constructed in accordance with the FIA Formula 3 regulations that applied between 1 January 2002 and 31 December 2004
- Formula 3 National B – for cars constructed in accordance with the FIA Formula 3 regulations that applied between 1 January 1999 and 31 December 2001

== Points System ==
Championship points were awarded on a 20–15–12–10–8–6–4–3–2–1 basis to the top ten classified finishers in the Championship Class in each race. One additional point was awarded to the driver setting the fastest lap time in the class in each qualifying session and in each race at each round. The same system was also used for both the National A Class and the National B Class awards.

== Teams and drivers ==
The following teams and drivers have competed during the 2009 Australian Formula 3 season.

Team	Class	Chassis	Engine	No	Driver
Astuti Motorsport	Gold Star	Dallara F307	Mugen-Honda	2	(Australia) Mat Sofi
Astuti Motorsport	Gold Star	Dallara F307	Sodemo-Renault	7	(Australia) Ray Chamberlain
Astuti Motorsport	National A	Dallara F304	Sodemo-Renault	10	(Australia) Kristian Lindbom
Astuti Motorsport	Gold Star	Dallara F307	Sodemo-Renault	11	(Indonesia) Rio Haryanto
Team BRM	Gold Star	Dallara F307	HWA-Mercedes-Benz	3	(New Zealand) Mathew Radisich
Team BRM	Gold Star	Dallara F307	HWA-Mercedes-Benz	4	(New Zealand) Mitch Evans
Team BRM	Gold Star	Dallara F307	HWA-Mercedes-Benz	5	(United Kingdom) Joey Foster
Scarborough Holiday Parks	National B	Dallara F301	Spiess-Opel	6	(Australia) Andrew Mill
Scarborough Holiday Parks	National B	Dallara F301	Spiess-Opel	96	(Australia) Blake Varney
R-Tek Motorsport Services	National A	Dallara F304	Spiess-Opel	7	(Australia) Roger Iánson
R-Tek Motorsport Services	National A	Dallara F304	Spiess-Opel	7	(China) Zhang Shan Qi
R-Tek Motorsport Services	National A	Dallara F304	Spiess-Opel	8	(China) Li Zhi Cong
R-Tek Motorsport Services	National A	Dallara F304	Spiess-Opel	59	(Australia) Jesse Wakeman
JB Motorsport	National B	Dallara F301	Novamotor-Fiat	12	(Australia) John Boothman
PHR Scuderia	National A	Dallara F304	Sodemo-Renault	15	(Indonesia) Maher Algadri
PHR Scuderia	National A	Dallara F304	Sodemo-Renault	16	(Indonesia) Rio Haryanto
Gilmour Racing	National A	Dallara F304	Spiess-Opel	17	(Australia) Chris Gilmour
Ralt Australia	National A	Dallara F304	Sodemo-Renault	19	(Australia) Tom Tweedie
GKH Powdercoating	National A	Dallara F304	Spiess-Opel	21	(Australia) Graeme Holmes
Scud Racing	Gold Star	Dallara F307	HWA-Mercedes-Benz	25	(Australia) Tim Macrow
Scud Racing	National B	Dallara F301	Spiess-Opel	35	(United Kingdom) Peter Kalpakiotis
Scud Racing	National B	Dallara F396	TOM's-Toyota	45	(Australia) Michael Gray
Hack, Anderson & Thomas	National B	Dallara F396	TOM's-Toyota	37	(Australia) Rod Anderson
Tandersport	National A	Dallara F304	Spiess-Opel	42	(Australia) Bryce Moore
Tandersport	National A	Dallara F304	Spiess-Opel	42	(Australia) Leanne Tander
Tandersport	Gold Star	Dallara F307	HWA-Mercedes-Benz	52	(New Zealand) Ben Crighton
Cooltemp Racing	National A	Dallara F304	Spiess-Opel	60	(Australia) Bevan Carrick

== Race calendar ==
Originally Event 7 of the series was to have taken place at Symmons Plains Raceway in Tasmania, and was indeed set to host the series signature race, the Tasmanian Super Prix on 18 October, however with several other series involved in the Shannons Nationals Motor Racing Championships withdrawing from the logistically difficult Tasmanian meeting, the event was cancelled. Subsequently, a new meeting was organised to be held at Queensland Raceway on 21 August on the support card of the V8 Supercar Championship Series.

Event	Round	Circuit	Date	Pole position	Fastest lap	Winning driver	Winning team
1	1	(South Australia) Adelaide Street Circuit	21 March	(United Kingdom) Joey Foster	(United Kingdom) Joey Foster	(United Kingdom) Joey Foster	(Australia) Team BRM
1	2	(South Australia) Adelaide Street Circuit	22 March	(United Kingdom) Joey Foster	(United Kingdom) Joey Foster	(United Kingdom) Joey Foster	(Australia) Team BRM
2	3	(New South Wales) Wakefield Park	26 April	(United Kingdom) Joey Foster	(United Kingdom) Joey Foster	(Australia) Tim Macrow	(Australia) Scud Racing
2	4	(New South Wales) Wakefield Park	26 April	(United Kingdom) Joey Foster	(United Kingdom) Joey Foster	(United Kingdom) Joey Foster	(Australia) Team BRM
3	5	(Victoria (state)) Phillip Island	17 May	(Australia) Tim Macrow	(United Kingdom) Joey Foster	(United Kingdom) Joey Foster	(Australia) Team BRM
3	6	(Victoria (state)) Phillip Island	17 May	(Australia) Tim Macrow	(Australia) Tim Macrow	(Australia) Tim Macrow	(Australia) Scud Racing
4	7	(Victoria (state)) Winton Motor Raceway	28 June	(Australia) Tim Macrow	(United Kingdom) Joey Foster	(Australia) Tim Macrow	(Australia) Scud Racing
4	8	(Victoria (state)) Winton Motor Raceway	28 June	(United Kingdom) Joey Foster	(United Kingdom) Joey Foster	(United Kingdom) Joey Foster	(Australia) Team BRM
5	9	(New South Wales) Eastern Creek Raceway	19 July	(Australia) Tim Macrow	(Australia) Tim Macrow	(Australia) Mat Sofi	(Australia) Transwest Racing
5	10	(New South Wales) Eastern Creek Raceway	19 July	(Australia) Tim Macrow	(United Kingdom) Joey Foster	(Australia) Tim Macrow	(Australia) Scud Racing
6	11	Queensland Raceway	21 August	(United Kingdom) Joey Foster	(Australia) Tim Macrow	(Australia) Tim Macrow	(Australia) Scud Racing
6	12	Queensland Raceway	21 August	(Australia) Tim Macrow	(Australia) Mat Sofi	(Australia) Tim Macrow	(Australia) Scud Racing
7	13	(New South Wales) Oran Park Raceway	30 August	(Australia) Tim Macrow	(Australia) Mat Sofi	(United Kingdom) Joey Foster	(Australia) Team BRM
7	14	(New South Wales) Oran Park Raceway	30 August	(Australia) Mat Sofi	(Australia) Mat Sofi	(Australia) Tim Macrow	(Australia) Scud Racing
8	15	(Victoria (state)) Sandown Raceway	29 November	(United Kingdom) Joey Foster	(New Zealand) Ben Crighton	(United Kingdom) Joey Foster	(Australia) Team BRM
8	16	(Victoria (state)) Sandown Raceway	29 November	(Australia) Mat Sofi	(United Kingdom) Joey Foster	(New Zealand) Mitch Evans	(Australia) Team BRM

== Results and standings ==
=== Drivers Championship ===
Pos	Driver	ADE 1	ADE 2	WAK 1	WAK 2	PHI 1	PHI 2	WIN 1	WIN 2	EAS 1	EAS 2	QLD 1	QLD 2	ORA 1	ORA 2	SAN 1	SAN 2	Pts
GOLD STAR
1	(United Kingdom) Joey Foster	1	1	3	1	1	Ret	2	1	2	4	2	2	1	7	1	2	265
2	(Australia) Tim Macrow	Ret	2	1	4	2	1	1	2	3	1	1	1	2	1	2	4	257
3	(Australia) Mat Sofi	4	3	2	2	3	9	Ret	5	1	3	4	3	4	2	8	3	192
4	(New Zealand) Ben Crighton	6	7	6	3	5	2	3	3	4	2	3	4	Ret	Ret	7	6	151
5	(New Zealand) Mitch Evans															4	1	32
6	(Australia) Ray Chamberlain	9	10	7	6													30
7	(New Zealand) Mathew Radisich	2	4															25
8	(Indonesia) Rio Haryanto															6	5	18
NATIONAL A
1	(Australia) Tom Tweedie	3	5	4	5	Ret	4	4	4	5	5	5	5	Ret	3	3	9	288
2	(Australia) Graeme Holmes	8	9			9	7			6	6	10	9	6	5	12	10	124
3	(Australia) Jesse Wakeman	7	8	5	7	7	6	5	7	10	Ret							116
4	(Australia) Chris Gilmour	5	6			6	5					7	Ret	3	Ret			93
5	(Indonesia) Maher Algadri					8	8	6	8	7	7	12	10	7	Ret			86
6	(Australia) Roger I'Anson											9	6	8	4			49
7	(Australia) Leanne Tander					4	3											44
8	(Australia) Bryce Moore															9	7	33
9	(Australia) Bevan Carrick											11	Ret	5	6			31
10	(Australia) Kristian Lindbom															5	8	30
11	(Indonesia) Rio Haryanto											6	8					29
12	(China) Li Zhi Cong															10	Ret	10
13	(China) Zhang Shan Qi															11	Ret	8
NATIONAL B
1	(United Kingdom) Peter Kalpakiotis											13	11	9	Ret	13	Ret	78
2	(Australia) Rod Anderson							7	6									44
2	(Australia) Andrew Mill											8	7					44
–	(Australia) Blake Varney											DNS	DNS					0

Colour	Result
Gold	Winner
Silver	Second place
Bronze	Third place
Green	Points classification
Blue	Non-points classification
Blue	Non-classified finish (NC)
Purple	Retired, not classified (Ret)
Red	Did not qualify (DNQ)
Red	Did not pre-qualify (DNPQ)
Black	Disqualified (DSQ)
White	Did not start (DNS)
White	Withdrew (WD)
White	Race cancelled (C)
Blank	Did not practice (DNP)
Blank	Did not arrive (DNA)
Blank	Excluded (EX)

== See also ==
- Australian Drivers' Championship
- Australian Formula 3
