= 2013 Australian Drivers' Championship =

Motor racing competition

The 2013 Formula 3 Australian Drivers' Championship was a CAMS sanctioned Australian motor racing title, the winner of which was awarded the 2013 CAMS Gold Star. It was the 57th Australian Drivers' Championship and the ninth to be contested with open wheel racing cars constructed in accordance with FIA Formula 3 regulations. The championship began on 29 March at the Mount Panorama Circuit and ended on 17 November at Sandown Raceway after seven rounds across five different states and territories. Formula 3 Management Pty Ltd was appointed by CAMS as the Category Manager for the Championship.

With nine victories and nine second places, Tim Macrow won his second Australian Drivers' Championship title by 32 points ahead of seven-time race winner John Magro, while Nick Foster rounded out the top three placings, with two race victories to his name. The only other race winners during the season were Nathan Morcom and James Winslow, who each won a race at the Mount Panorama round.

== Race calendar ==
The championship was contested over a seven-round series.

Round	Circuit	Date	Format	Winning driver	Car
1	(New South Wales) Mount Panorama Circuit	29–31 March	Two races	James Winslow	Dallara F307 Mercedes-Benz
2	(Tasmania) Symmons Plains Raceway	5–7 April	Three races	Tim Macrow	Dallara F307 Mercedes-Benz
3	(Northern Territory) Hidden Valley Raceway	14–15 June	Three races	Nick Foster	Mygale M08 Mercedes-Benz
4	(New South Wales) Sydney Motorsport Park	12–14 July	Three races	John Magro	Dallara F307 Mercedes-Benz
5	Queensland Raceway	2–4 August	Three races	Tim Macrow	Dallara F307 Mercedes-Benz
6	(Victoria (state)) Phillip Island	20–22 September	Three races	John Magro	Dallara F307 Mercedes-Benz
7	(Victoria (state)) Sandown Raceway	15–17 November	Three races	John Magro	Dallara F307 Mercedes-Benz

== Teams and drivers ==
The following teams and drivers contested the 2013 Australian Drivers' Championship.

Team	Class	Chassis	Engine	No.	Driver	Rounds
Team BRM	Gold Star	Dallara F307	HWA-Mercedes-Benz	1	(United Kingdom) James Winslow	1
Team BRM	Gold Star	Dallara F307	HWA-Mercedes-Benz	2	(Australia) Tim Macrow	2–7
Team BRM	Gold Star	Dallara F307	HWA-Mercedes-Benz	3	(Australia) John Magro	All
Team BRM	Gold Star	Dallara F307	HWA-Mercedes-Benz	4	(Australia) Jordan Oon	1–6
Team BRM	Gold Star	Dallara F307	HWA-Mercedes-Benz	4	(Australia) Simon Hodge	7
Team BRM	Gold Star	Mygale M08	HWA-Mercedes-Benz	5	(Australia) Nick Foster	All
R-Tek Motorsport	Gold Star	Dallara F307	HWA-Mercedes-Benz	6	(Australia) Nathan Morcom	1–5
R-Tek Motorsport	Gold Star	Dallara F307	HWA-Mercedes-Benz	6	(Australia) Jack Le Brocq	6
R-Tek Motorsport	Gold Star	Dallara F307	HWA-Mercedes-Benz	7	(Australia) Steel Giuliana	1–4
R-Tek Motorsport	National	Dallara F304	Spiess-Opel	8	(Australia) Todd Hazelwood	All
R-Tek Motorsport	National	Dallara F304	Spiess-Opel	9	(Australia) Jon Collins	All
Astuti Motorsport	Gold Star	Dallara F307	Sodemo-Renault	11	(Australia) Nick McBride	1
Gilmour Racing	National	Dallara F304	Spiess-Opel	16	(South Africa) Arrie Maree	All
Gilmour Racing	Gold Star	Dallara F307	HWA-Mercedes-Benz	17	(Australia) Ben Gersekowski	All
Tim Macrow Racing	Gold Star	Dallara F307	Spiess-Opel	25	(Australia) Tim Macrow	1
Erebus Academy	Gold Star	Mygale M08	HWA-Mercedes-Benz	36	(Australia) Jack Le Brocq	1–2
Erebus Academy	Gold Star	Mygale M08	HWA-Mercedes-Benz	36	(New Zealand) Andre Heimgartner	3
Harvest Motorsport	Gold Star	Mygale M08	HWA-Mercedes-Benz	46	(Australia) Aiden Wright	6
AGI Sport	National	Dallara F304	Renault	66	(Australia) Nathan Gotch	4
BF Racing	Gold Star	Dallara F308	HWA-Mercedes-Benz	93	(Australia) Hayden Cooper	1–3

== Classes ==
Competing cars were nominated into one of three classes:

- Australian Formula 3 Championship – for automobiles constructed in accordance with the FIA Formula 3 regulations that applied in the year of manufacture between 1 January 2002 and 31 December 2011.
- National Class – for automobiles constructed in accordance with the FIA Formula 3 regulations that applied in the year of manufacture between 1 January 1999 and 31 December 2004.
- Invitational Class.

== Points system ==
Outright championship points were awarded as follows:

- One point was awarded to the driver placed in the highest grid position for the first race at each round.
- 20–15–12–10–8–6–4–3–2–1 for the first ten finishing positions in each race of a round which comprised two races.
- 12–9–8–7–6–5–4–3–2–1 for the first ten finishing position in the first two races of a round which comprised three races.
- 20–15–12–10–8–6–4–3–2–1 basis for the first ten finishing position in the third race of a round which comprised three races.
- One point was awarded to the driver setting the fastest lap time in each race.

Points towards the National Class award were allocated on the same basis as used for the outright championship.

== Results ==
=== Australian Drivers' Championship ===
Pos.	Driver	BAT 1	BAT 2	SYM 1	SYM 2	SYM 3	HID 1	HID 2	HID 3	SMP 1	SMP 2	SMP 3	QLD 1	QLD 2	QLD 3	PHI 1	PHI 2	PHI 3	SAN 1	SAN 2	SAN 3	Pts
1	(Australia) Tim Macrow	DNS	DNS	1	1	1	1	2	2	2	2	2	1	1	1	2	1	2	2	2	1	238
2	(Australia) John Magro	2	5	5	4	3	6	5	Ret	1	1	1	5	4	4	1	2	1	1	1	2	206
3	(Australia) Nick Foster	6	3	6	6	6	2	1	1	3	4	DSQ	2	5	2	Ret	4	3	Ret	3	Ret	150
4	(Australia) Ben Gersekowski	11	10	7	5	5	4	4	3	5	6	4	3	2	5	4	Ret	DNS	7	4	4	118
5	(Australia) Jordan Oon	5	11	10	8	9	3	3	4	6	3	9	4	3	3	5	5	5				104
6	(Australia) Nathan Morcom	4	1	3	7	7	5	6	6	4	5	3	6	6	6							95
7	(Australia) Jack Le Brocq	3	9	4	3	4										3	3	4				66
8	(South Africa) Arrie Maree	8	6	8	9	10	7	9	8	10	8	8	7	9	Ret	8	6	6	5	7	DNS	56
9	(Australia) Todd Hazelwood	10	7	9	Ret	11	8	10	9	8	9	7	9	8	8	9	7	7	6	8	6	55
10	(Australia) Steel Giuliania	12	4	2	2	2	Ret	DNS	DNS	7	Ret	6										53
11	(Australia) Jon Collins	9	Ret	Ret	10	12	Ret	Ret	DNS	9	7	10	8	7	7	7	8	8	4	6	5	51
12	(United Kingdom) James Winslow	1	2																			27.5
13	(Australia) Simon Hodge																		3	5	3	26
14	(New Zealand) Andre Heimgartner						9	7	5													14
15	(Australia) Hayden Cooper	Ret	DNS	11	Ret	8	Ret	8	7													10
16	(Australia) Nick McBride	7	8																			5.5
17	(Australia) Aiden Wright															6	Ret	DNS				5
18	(Australia) Nathan Gotch									11	10	11										2

Colour	Result
Gold	Winner
Silver	Second place
Bronze	Third place
Green	Points classification
Blue	Non-points classification
Blue	Non-classified finish (NC)
Purple	Retired, not classified (Ret)
Red	Did not qualify (DNQ)
Red	Did not pre-qualify (DNPQ)
Black	Disqualified (DSQ)
White	Did not start (DNS)
White	Withdrew (WD)
White	Race cancelled (C)
Blank	Did not practice (DNP)
Blank	Did not arrive (DNA)
Blank	Excluded (EX)

Race 2 at the Mount Panorama round was stopped due to rain after eight of the scheduled thirteen laps had been completed and half points were awarded.

=== National Class ===
The National Class award was won by Arrie Maree (247 points) from Todd Hazelwood (214.5), Jon Collins (192) and Nathan Gotch (24).

=== Invitation Class ===
No drivers earned points in the Invitation Class at any round.

== See also ==
- Australian Drivers' Championship
- Australian Formula 3
