= 2012 Australian Drivers' Championship =

Motor racing competition

The 2012 Formula 3 Australian Drivers' Championship was a CAMS sanctioned national motor racing title with the winner awarded the 2012 CAMS Gold Star award. The 2012 championship was the 56th Australian Drivers' Championship and the eighth to be contested with open wheel racing cars constructed in accordance with FIA Formula 3 regulations. The 2012 Australian Formula 3 Championship title was also awarded to the series winner. The championship began on 1 March 2012 at the Adelaide Street Circuit and ended on 23 September at Phillip Island Grand Prix Circuit after seven rounds across six different states with three races at each round.

The championship was secured by British driver James Winslow after the penultimate round held at Queensland Raceway. It was Winslow's second championship victory after having won previously in 2008. Winslow, driving for R-Tek Motorsport, won 13 of the 21 races, including five of the seven feature races, over the course of the season, a new record for the Australian Drivers' Championship, eclipsing the 12 wins Rick Kelly took in 2001. Defending champion Chris Gilmour ended the series in second place having won two races. Winslow's teammate Steel Giuliania finished third in the championship with just over half of the points Winslow collected. Jordan Skinner of Team BRM and Hayden Cooper of BF Racing each collected a their debut race victories. The other races wins were collected by John Magro whose partial season campaign with Team BRM ended with winning the Hidden Valley round. Tim Macrow made a brief return to the series he won in 2007, contesting a single round with Astuti Motorsport, winning at Sydney Motorsport Park.

Cooper won the National Class, for cars built between 1999 and 2004, over fellow Queensland and BF Racing teammate Ben Gersekowski. Lochie Marshall finished third.

== Race calendar ==
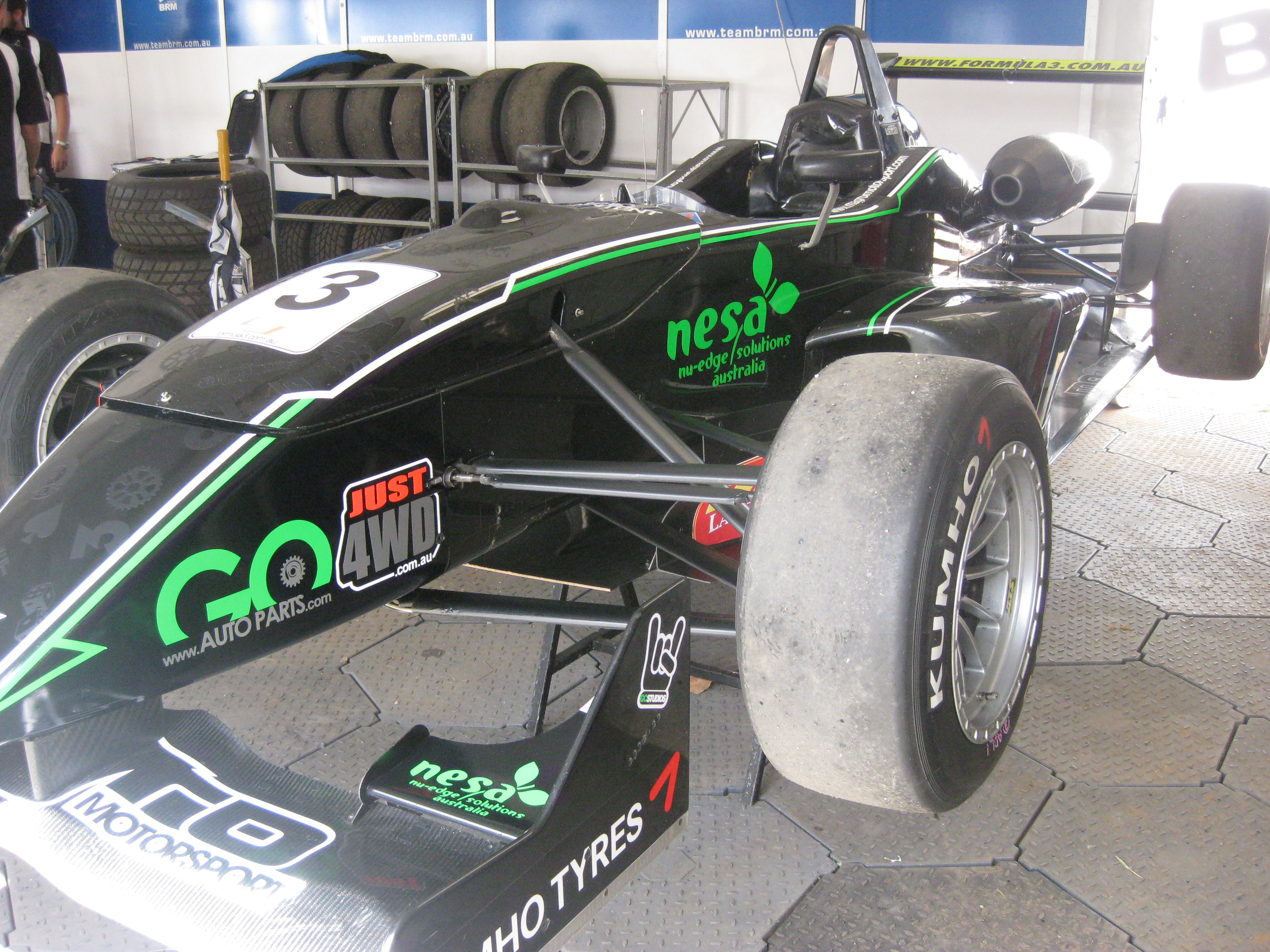
The Dallara F307 Mercedes-Benz of John Magro, who placed sixth in the championship

The championship was contested over a seven-round series, with two Sprint Races and a Feature Race at each round.

Round	Circuit	Date	Winner
1	(South Australia) Adelaide Street Circuit	1–4 March	James Winslow
2	(Tasmania) Symmons Plains Raceway	30 March – 1 April	James Winslow
3	(New South Wales) Mount Panorama Circuit	6–8 April	James Winslow
4	(Northern Territory) Hidden Valley Raceway	15–17 June	John Magro
5	(New South Wales) Eastern Creek Raceway	13–15 July	Tim Macrow
6	Queensland Raceway	3–5 August	James Winslow
7	(Victoria (state)) Phillip Island	21–23 September	Chris Gilmour

== Teams and drivers ==
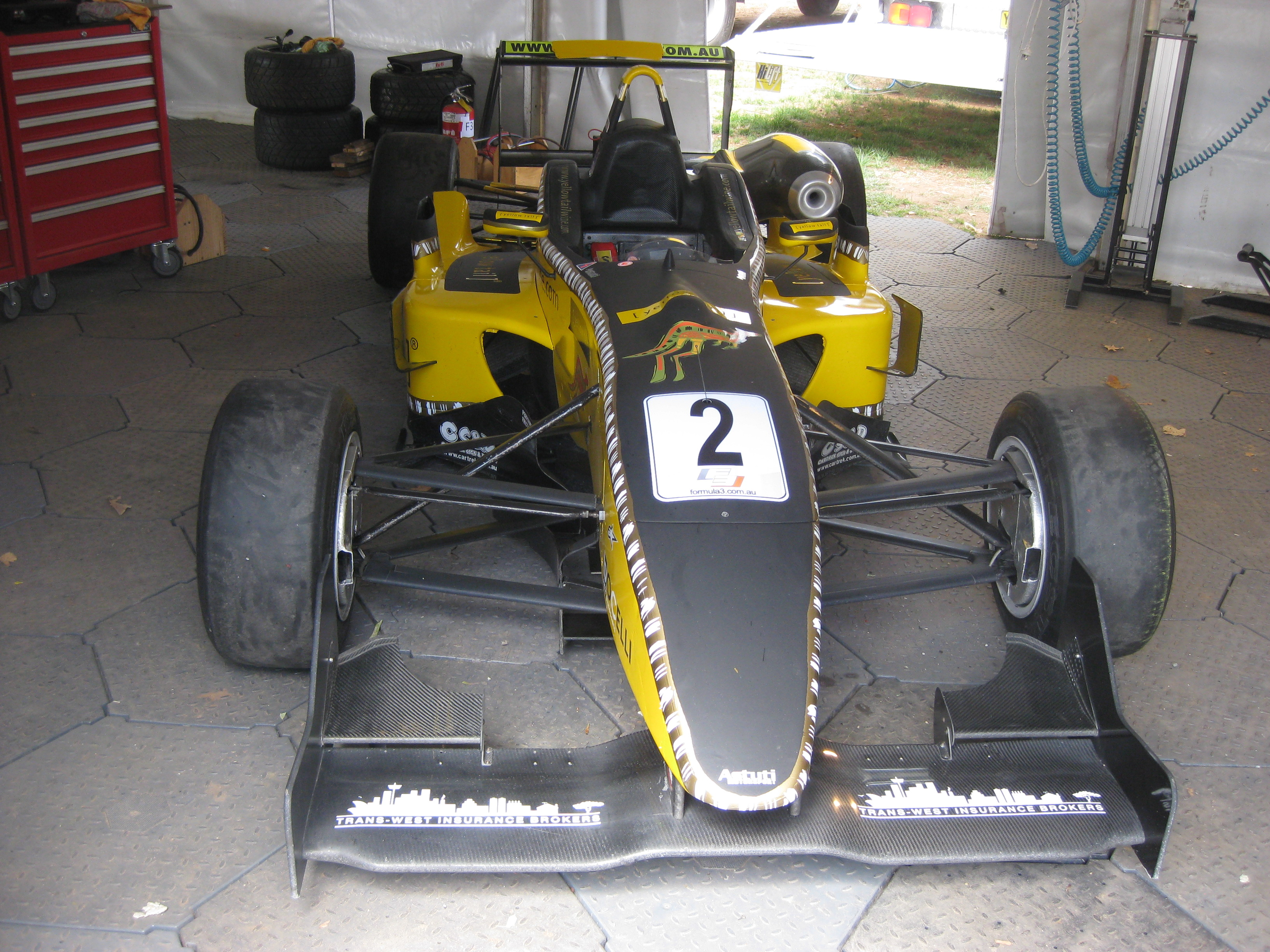
The Dallara F307 Mugen Honda of Matt Sofi, who placed eleventh in the championship

The following teams and drivers contested the 2012 Australian Drivers' Championship. Entries sourced in part from:

Team	Class	Chassis	Engine	No.	Driver
Gilmour Racing	Gold Star	Dallara F307	HWA-Mercedes-Benz	1	(Australia) Chris Gilmour
Astuti Motorsport	Gold Star	Dallara F307	Mugen-Honda	2	(Australia) Mat Sofi
Astuti Motorsport	Gold Star	Dallara F307	Sodemo-Renault	11	(New Zealand) Chris Vlok
Astuti Motorsport	Gold Star	Dallara F307	Sodemo-Renault	11	(Australia) Tim Macrow
Astuti Motorsport	Gold Star	Dallara F307	Sodemo-Renault	11	(Australia) Nathan Morcom
Team BRM	Gold Star	Dallara F307	HWA-Mercedes-Benz	3	(Australia) John Magro
Team BRM	Gold Star	Dallara F307	HWA-Mercedes-Benz	4	(Australia) Jordan Skinner
Team BRM	Gold Star	Dallara F307	HWA-Mercedes-Benz	5	(Australia) Nick Foster
R-Tek Motorsport	Gold Star	Dallara F307	HWA-Mercedes-Benz	6	(United Kingdom) James Winslow
R-Tek Motorsport	Gold Star	Dallara F307	HWA-Mercedes-Benz	7	(Australia) Steel Giuliana
R-Tek Motorsport	National	Dallara F304	Spiess-Opel	8	(Australia) Chris Slusarski
R-Tek Motorsport	National	Dallara F304	Spiess-Opel	8	(Australia) Mike Wayne
R-Tek Motorsport	National	Dallara F304	Spiess-Opel	8	(Australia) Jon Collins
R-Tek Motorsport	National	Dallara F304	Spiess-Opel	9	(Australia) Adrian Cottrell
R-Tek Motorsport	National	Dallara F304	Spiess-Opel	9	(Australia) Adam Gill
R-Tek Motorsport	National	Dallara F304	Spiess-Opel	9	(Australia) Jon Collins
Marshall Motorsport	National	Dallara F304	Sodemo-Renault	22	(Australia) Lockie Marshall
Mills Motorsport	Gold Star	Mygale M07	HWA-Mercedes-Benz	32	(Australia) Jon Mills
BF Racing	National	Dallara F304	Spiess-Opel	42	(Australia) Ben Gersekowski
BF Racing	National	Dallara F304	Spiess-Opel	93	(Australia) Hayden Cooper
Harvest Motorsport	Gold Star	Mygale M10	HWA-Mercedes-Benz	46	(Australia) Roman Krumins
Snake Racing	National	Dallara F304	Sodemo-Renault	66	(Australia) Nathan Gotch
G-Force Motorsport	Gold Star	Mygale M07	HWA-Mercedes-Benz	77	(Australia) Cam Waters
G-Force Motorsport	Gold Star	Mygale M07	HWA-Mercedes-Benz	77	(Australia) Jake Fouracre

== Classes ==
Competing cars were nominated into one of three classes:

- Australian Formula 3 Championship – for automobiles constructed in accordance with the FIA Formula 3 regulations that applied in the year of manufacture between 1 January 2002 and 31 December 2011.
- National Class – for automobiles constructed in accordance with the FIA Formula 3 regulations that applied in the year of manufacture between 1 January 1999 and 31 December 2004.
- Invitation Class.

There were no competitors in the Invitation Class in the 2012 championship.

== Points system ==
Championship points were awarded as follows:

- One point to the driver placed in the highest grid position for the first race at each round.
- 12–9–8–7–6–5–4–3–2–1 for the first ten finishing position in each Sprint Race.
- 20–15–12–10–8–6–4–3–2–1 for the first ten finishing position in each Feature Race.
- One point to the driver setting the fastest lap time in each race.

Points towards the National Class award were allocated on the same basis as used for the outright championship.

== Results ==
=== Drivers' championship ===
Pos	Driver	ADE 1	ADE 2	ADE 3	SYM 1	SYM 2	SYM 3	BAT 1	BAT 2	BAT 3	HID 1	HID 2	HID 3	EAS 1	EAS 2	EAS 3	QLD 1	QLD 2	QLD 3	PHI 1	PHI 2	PHI 3	Pts
GOLD STAR
1	(United Kingdom) James Winslow	1	1	1	1	1	1	2	1	1	3	2	5	1	2	2	1	1	1	8	3	1	276
2	(Australia) Chris Gilmour	3	3	3	4	3	2	4	2	2	1	5	2	3	4	4	6	3	2	1	4	2	215
3	(Australia) Steel Giuliania	9	10	9	2	4	5	Ret	8	6	6	4	3	4	3	3	2	2	3	2	Ret	3	141
4	(Australia) Jordan Skinner	4	4	5	3	5	4	1	Ret	8	5	6	7	Ret	5	5	3	4	6				111
5	(Australia) Hayden Cooper	8	7	4	6	8	7	7	7	5	9	9	9	5	8	6	5	5	4	3	1	Ret	109
6	(Australia) John Magro	6	5	7	Ret	2	3	Ret	4	Ret	2	1	1										88
7	(Australia) Ben Gersekowski	5	8	Ret	Ret	7	8	6	5	4	10	7	8	6	Ret	8	4	7	DNS	Ret	6	6	75
8	(Australia) Lockie Marshall										7	8	6	8	10	7	7	6	5	4	7	5	57
9	(Australia) Tim Macrow													2	1	1							44
10	(Australia) Adrian Cottrell	Ret	Ret	6	5	6	6	5	6	7													38
11	(Australia) Mat Sofi	2	2	2																			35
12	(Australia) Nick Foster							3	3	3													28
13	(Australia) Cam Waters										4	3	4										25
14	(Australia) Nathan Morcom																			5	5	4	22
15	(Australia) Jon Collins													DNS	7	9	8	9	8	Ret	Ret	7	18
15	(Australia) Roman Krumins																9	8	7	7	8	9	18
17	(Australia) Jake Fouracre																			6	2	8	17
18	(Australia) Nathan Gotch							8	9	Ret				7	6	10							15
19	(Australia) Mike Wayne				7	9	9				8	10	10				10	Ret	DNS				14
20	(New Zealand) Chris Vlok	7	6	Ret																			9
21	(Australia) Chris Slusarski	10	9	8																			6
22	(Australia) Jon Mills				8	Ret	Ret	DNS	DNS	DNS							Ret	Ret	DNS				3
23	(Australia) Adam Gill													Ret	9	Ret							2

Colour	Result
Gold	Winner
Silver	Second place
Bronze	Third place
Green	Points classification
Blue	Non-points classification
Blue	Non-classified finish (NC)
Purple	Retired, not classified (Ret)
Red	Did not qualify (DNQ)
Red	Did not pre-qualify (DNPQ)
Black	Disqualified (DSQ)
White	Did not start (DNS)
White	Withdrew (WD)
White	Race cancelled (C)
Blank	Did not practice (DNP)
Blank	Did not arrive (DNA)
Blank	Excluded (EX)

== See also ==
- Australian Drivers' Championship
- Australian Formula 3
