= Macrow =

Macrow is a surname. Notable people with the surname include:

- Adam Macrow (born 1978), Australian racing driver
- Tim Macrow (born 1982), Australian racing driver
- William Macrow (1889–1970), Australian cricketer
