= Motoring Today =

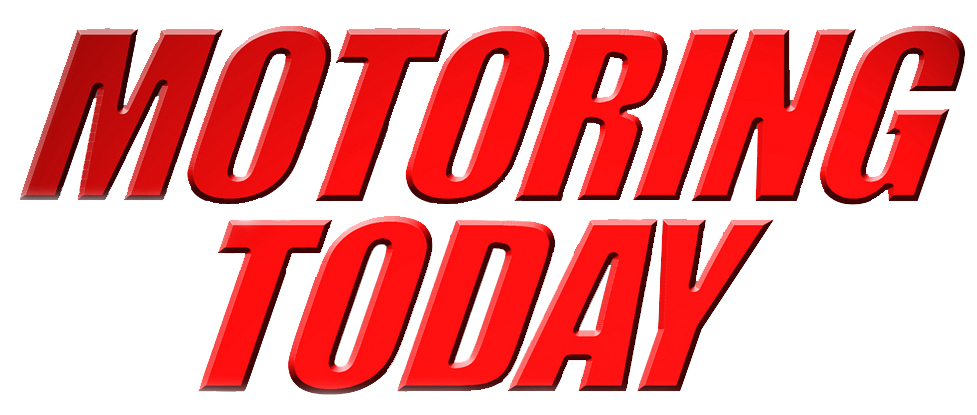
- Genre: Driving; Motorsports
- Created by: Ray Butch Gamboa
- Presented by: Ray Butch Gamboa (1987–2019); Pocholo Ramirez; Ray Louis Gamboa; Suzy Gamboa
- Country of origin: Philippines
- Original language: English

Production
- Producers: Ray Butch Gamboa; Jenny Bleza
- Running time: 60 minutes
- Production companies: Sunshine Television Ventures, Inc.

Original release
- Network: PTV/NBN (1987–2006; 2008–2009); IBC (1989-2005); Solar Sports (2009–present)
- Release: June 7, 1987 – present

Motoring Today is a Philippine motoring and motorsports television program, premiered on 7 June 1987, hosted by its creator Ray Butch Gamboa and race car driver Pocholo Ramirez. In 2019, Ray Louis Gamboa and Suzy Gamboa replaced their father as the hosts. It was the longest-running motoring and motorsports program on Philippine television, and has a counterpart weekly column, penned by Gamboa, in the daily newspaper The Philippine STAR.

Since its inception, Motoring Today has been produced by Sunshine Television Ventures, Inc. and has been aired on PTV 4 from 1987 to 2006, and again, from 2008 until 2009 and IBC 13 from 1989 to 2005, when it transferred to Solar Sports. It currently airs every Sunday at 8:30 am.

== History ==
=== Early years ===
Motoring Today was conceived in 1987 by former radio disc jockey Ray Butch Gamboa, who wanted to bring all facets of Philippine motoring closer to Filipino television viewers. Prior to the program’s debut, Gamboa already has experience covering motorsports events such as the Philippines Grand Prix in the 1970s and racing events of the Automobile Racing Association of the Philippines. A few years back, he had established Sunshine Television Ventures, together with his long-time friend and marketing executive, Tony Sulit, for the purpose of acquiring exclusive contracts for the airing of movie trailers on commercial breaks during the television broadcast of Philippine Basketball Association (PBA) games on PTV 4. The company became the vehicle for the inception of Motoring Today.

The program's pilot episode was aired on 7 June 1987 on PTV 4. It was taped inside the Playboy Club of the Silahis Hotel (later renamed as Grand Boulevard Hotel) in Malate, Manila; and was hosted by Gamboa and race car driver Pocholo Ramirez, who Gamboa met previously in various racing events. The hour-long episode featured interviews with then-race car rally driver Gus Lagman and Billy Martinez, one of the co-founders of Cam Wreckers, then a major motor sports club in the Philippines. The second episode had rally officials Gus Lagman, Boy Saycon and Robert Aventajado as guests and Aventajado’s rally car became the first-ever vehicle featured on the show. The program aired at 3:00 p.m. every Sunday before the PBA game and had very few sponsors, including Marlboro, STP and Shell. After the first two episodes, Gamboa transferred production to the Card Room of the Valle Verde Country Club in Pasig, where the program is taped and edited until 2019.

=== Motoring events ===
Since its inception, Motoring Today has provided live coverage of some of the most prestigious motorsports events in the Philippines and abroad. On 26 November 1989, it provided the first Philippine television coverage of the Macau Grand Prix. In 1990, it covered that Marlboro Mabuhay International Rally in Greenhills, San Juan City and the Marlboro 100 Hills Rally. The following year, on 3 November, Gamboa and his crew went to Adelaide, Australia for the live coverage of the Australian Grand Prix.

On 15 May 1992, the show reported live from Speedway, Indiana in the United States about the tragic death of 27-year-old Filipino race car driver Jovy Marcelo during qualifications for the Indianapolis 500. Marcelo was the first driver fatality at the Indianapolis Motor Speedway since Gordon Smiley in 1982. After the incident, the program aired a special tribute to Marcelo, chronicling his career. In 1997, the show went to Japan to cover the 37th Tokyo Motor Show as guests of Toyota Motor Philippines. It also returned to Australia to report about the Australian Grand Prix in Melbourne on 12 March 2000.
