= Asian Formula Three Championship =

Former auto racing championship

- Category: Single seaters
- Country: Southeast Asia
- Inaugural season: 2001
- Folded: 2008
- Drivers: 14 (2007-08)
- Teams: 5 (2007-08)
- Constructors: (Italy) Dallara
- Engine suppliers: TOM's-Toyota
- Last Drivers' champion: (Belgium) Frédéric Vervisch
- Last Teams' champion: (United Kingdom) Team Goddard
- Official website: asianf3.net

The Asian Formula Three Championship was a single-seater racing series based in South East Asia. It is one of a number of national and international Formula Three championships that form part of an established "career ladder" below Formula One. It was most recently promoted as the Asian F3 Pacific Series. The 2009 series collapsed through a lack of competitors with some teams dispersing to other Formula 3 series in the region.

== Creation and management ==
The creators of the Asian F3 Championship intended the series to provide young Asian drivers with a stepping stone to the higher levels of single-seater motor racing. Asia has not traditionally had the motor racing profile and career ladder from which European drivers benefit. There was clearly a need to change this and to demonstrate the feasibility of Formula Three to potential sponsors in light of the region's growing economy. The series' organisers have held corporate track days in the Philippines, as part of their efforts to attract sponsorship.

Asian F3 is positioned between two other single seater formulae in Asia's fledgling motorsport culture: below it sits Formula BMW Asia, which is one of four Formula BMW series worldwide, and positioned above it is Formula Renault V6, which is derived from the now defunct Formula Renault V6 Eurocup that was held in Europe, and uses the same Tatuus chassis and Renault-derived V6 engine.

The championship is organised by the Asian Formula Three Corporation, which is managed by Jose Eduardo Peña from offices in Manila. The corporation's stockholders comprise the participating teams. Current stockholders include the proprietors of Speedtech Asia; Joson F3 Racing (disbanded); Team Goddard; Ghiasports (not in the series anymore); TOM's Asia (teamed up with Threebond Racing in the 2005 series); and Kinectic Racing (disbanded). Stockholders are not required to pay the entry fee of $2000 per season. Unfortunately, the 2007-08 season which is the pacific series, is the last season of the series. The series' reputation was badly damaged in the 2007-08 season by Bahrain driver Hamad Al Fardan who had complained that championship leaders Frederic Vervisch and Team Goddard were using illegal petrol to go faster than him. It was later revealed that Team Goddard principal, Mark Goddard, was also the organiser of the championship and was even competing under the pseudonym of "Don Tacos". While Fardan's comments were entirely unfounded, support in the final round of the 2007-08 season was minimal with a total of only 7 entered cars opposed to the 12 that had started at the first round. The 2009 season never materialized due to lack of teams and drivers joining the series, and the season champions which is the Team Goddard moved its racing operation in the Australian Formula 3 series that same year.

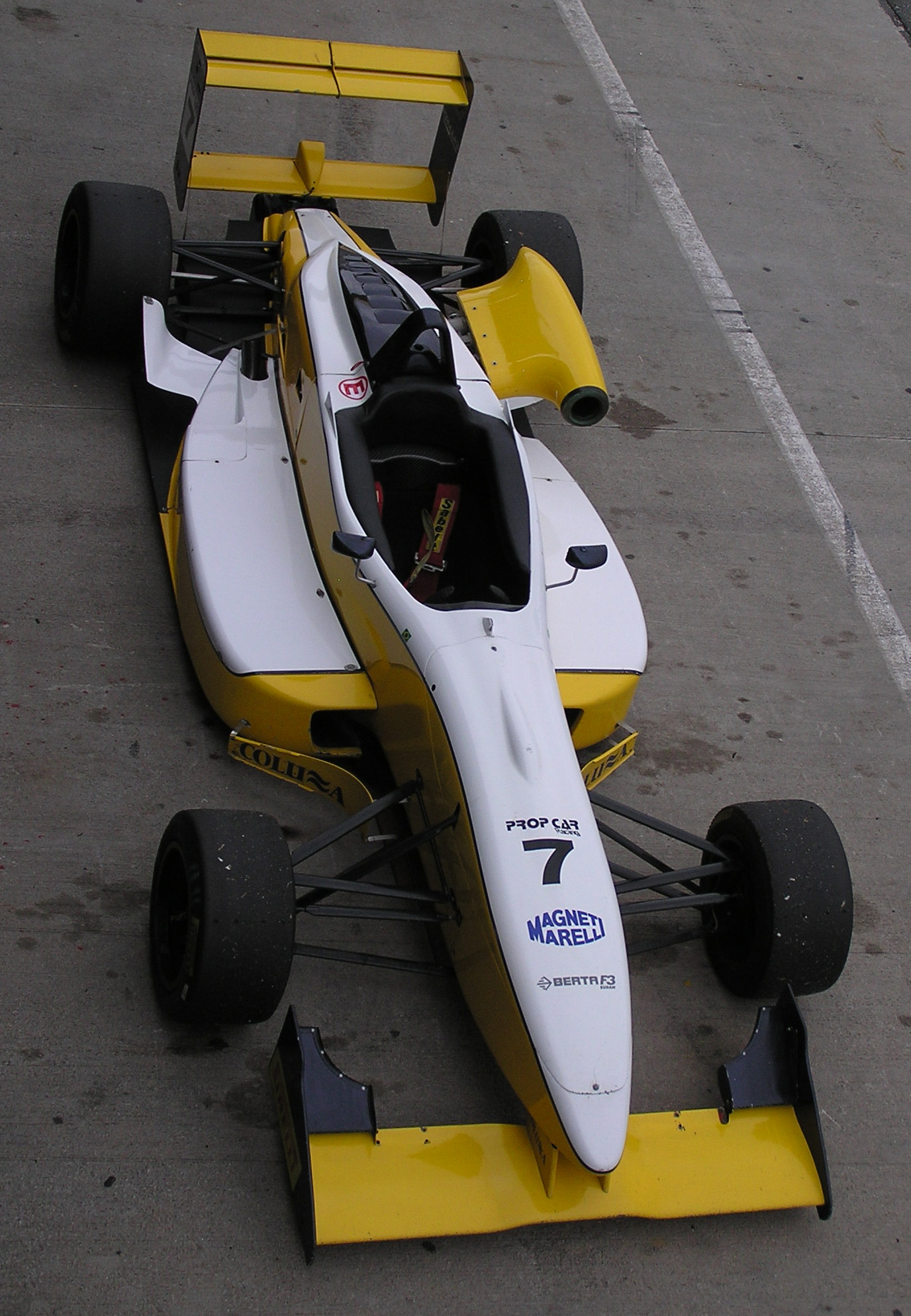
A typical Formula Three car

== Costs ==
The typical operating budget of an Asian F3 team is circa £80,000. This fact, coupled with a steady rise in its international profile, serves to attract a number of European drivers who lack the budget that is required to compete in the established European championships.

The winner of the drivers' championship title is rewarded with a fully sponsored entry to the end-of-season, non-championship Macau Grand Prix.

For 2007/08 season, the winner of the drivers' championship will be rewarded with a Formula 1 test drive with the Force India F1 Team.

== Drivers and teams ==
Notable drivers who have graduated from Asian F3 include Indonesian A1GP driver Ananda Mikola and 2004 champion, Australian Christian Jones, the son of former world champion Alan Jones. The 2006 champion, Britain's James Winslow, received attention and praise for his dramatic rescue of a competitor who was trapped in his upturned car at Sentul in Indonesia. In acknowledgment, he received a Gregor Grant Award at the annual Autosport Awards ceremony in the UK, and a Bronze Award from the Royal Humane Society.

The series benefits from the involvement of the noted Japanese F3 team, Three Bond Racing, which carried Winslow to the drivers' title in its collaboration with JA Motorsports, and secured the teams' title in the process.

At the end of 2007 the championship became a "winter type series" naming it the AF3 Pacific Series, starting the championship in November 2007 and ending in May 2008. New teams have joined the series during that championship, Drew-Evans Motorsport Group, Team GFH Bahrain, Champ Motorsport and PTRS from Hong Kong along with some good drivers, namely Frédéric Vervisch (the 2007-08 champion), Matthew Howson, Rafael Suzuki and Hamad Al Fardan. Ed Pead, Nial Quinn, Arturo Gonzales, Leonardo Valois, David Julien and Peter Kalpakiotis also raced at select rounds.

In the 2007 season Dillon Battisstini managed to beat Henri Karjalainen in the championship. Other notable drivers include Morenon Soerapto, Oliver Turvey, Paul Ip, Don Tacos, Philip Forsman, Walter Grubmüller, Robin Tato, Edwin Jowsey and James Littlejohn.

In 2006, the championship saw the first two lady drivers of the series, namely Gaby Dela Merced for Speedtech Asia Team Indonesia and Michele Bumgarner for Team Goddard. The series also saw the return of Roland Hermoso (2001 Formula Toyota champion) in Formula 3 racing driving alongside Gaby in Speedtech Asia Team Indonesia, and a new team was put up by Mandy Borja and John O'Hara naming it Aran Racing. Other notable drivers include Bagoes Hermanto and Satrio Hermanto from R&W team Indonesia.

While in 2005 saw numerous Filipino drivers joined the championship, namely Tyson Sy and JP Carino for Speedtech Asia, Dado Pena for Team Goddard, John Marcelo (brother of Jovy Marcelo) for Christian Jones Motorsports, Pepon Marave for Kinetic F3 Racing, Renan Morales for Fujitsu-Ten Team TOM'S, JP Tuason for Tuason Racing School and Enzo Pastor for Team T.E.C. Pilipnas.

As the series first inaugurated in the early 2000, numerous teams have joined the series, in 2002, Team Vertex of Marchy Lee, Paul and Jeffrey Chan, Michael Ho and Johnathan Chan. Christian Jones Motorsports return in 2004 after competing in the last few rounds of the series in 2003, along with Team BRM of Australia. Team Goddard was renamed Minardi Team Asia Team after the former F1 team joined the series and collaborated with Mark Goddard's team, while in 2009, the team opted to join the Australian Formula 3 leaving the Asian Formula 3 which it had won numerous drivers and teams championship.

== Regulations ==
Formula Three championships subscribe to the technical regulations that are set by the FIA, and the Asian F3 Championship is no exception, but there are some important differences in this instance. Formula Three is traditionally an open formula, which means that it does not restrict competitors to a single chassis or engine. Most series now use single "control" suppliers for tires and fuel, both of which are subject to the FIA's regulations, but Asian F3 goes a step further by using a single engine builder (TOM's-Toyota) and prohibiting the latest chassis specifications according to their age. These measures are part of a dedicated effort to minimise running budgets. The tires are supplied by Yokohama (now are Dunlops).

Like the British, Spanish and European championships, Asian F3 supports two championship classes: positioned below the International Class is a Promotions Class specifically for older chassis specifications. It is aimed primarily at younger, less experienced drivers. In the 2006 season, International Class drivers used the two-year-old Dallara F304 and the five-year-old F301, and Promotions Class drivers used the eight-year-old F398. Each of these specifications are part of a different three-year lifecycle in Dallara's update program.

== Event schedule ==
Each event in the championship is normally run to a four-day schedule. It comprises three races, plus three hours of free practice and one 30-minute qualifying session. The free practice is divided into six 30-minute sessions, split between the first two days of each four-day event. Qualifying is held on the third day, prior to the first race, with the second and third races held on the final day. Each race is at least 20 minutes in duration, over a distance of at least 40 km. Where a shorter two- or three-day schedule must be used, the dropped practice days are supplanted by equivalent test days earlier in the same week.

== Circuits ==
The Asian F3 Championship visits circuits located throughout the Southeast Asian region, which have included Sentul in Indonesia; Zhuhai and Goldenport Park in China; Autopolis in Japan; and Subic and Batangas in the Philippines. In 2007, Asian F3 visited Albert Park in Melbourne, Australia as a support race for the 2007 Australian Grand Prix.

== Champions ==
Season	Series Name	Champion	Team Champion
2001	Asian Formula Three Championship	(Philippines) JoJo Silverio	(Japan) TOM's-Zed
2002	Asian Formula Three Championship	(United Kingdom) Mark Goddard	(United Kingdom) Team Goddard
2003	Asian Formula Three Championship	(Philippines) Pepon Marave	(Philippines) Kinetic F3 Racing Team
2004	Asian Formula Three Championship	(Australia) Christian Jones	(Australia) Christian Jones Motorsport
2005	Asian Formula Three Championship	(Indonesia) Ananda Mikola	(Japan) ThreeBond Racing
2006	Asian Formula Three Championship	(United Kingdom) James Winslow	(Philippines) JA Motorsport
2007	Asian F3 Pacific Series	(United Kingdom) Dillon Battistini	(Republic of Ireland) Aran Racing
2007–08	Asian F3 Pacific Series	(Belgium) Frédéric Vervisch	(United Kingdom) Team Goddard
