= Pocholo Ramirez =

Filipino race car driver (1933–2009)

Pocholo Ramírez
- Born: José del Rosario Ramírez de Arellano; January 19, 1933; Manila, Philippine Islands
- Died: March 18, 2009 (aged 76); Philippines
- Other names: Pocholo, Tito Poch
- Occupation: Racing driver
- Years active: 1963–1987

José "Pocholo" del Rosario Ramírez de Arellano (January 19, 1933 – March 18, 2009), better known as Pocholo Ramírez, was a Filipino race car driver and television host. Also known as "Tito Poch", Ramirez was hailed as a racing legend in the Philippines, with a career in racing that spanned 45 years.

== Racing career ==
Ramirez was born in Manila, Philippines. He began his racing career at the age of 30, beginning as a kart racer, then as a rally car driver starting in 1964. He won the Shell Car Rally Championship in 1966 and 1970, and was named Slalom Driver of the Year in 1967 and 1968.

Ramirez began circuit racing in 1969 and formula racing in 1974. Between 1973 and 1986, Ramirez participated in several prominent Grand Prix races in Southeast Asia, including the Macau Grand Prix, the Malaysian Grand Prix, the Selangor Grand Prix and the Indonesian Grand Prix. He placed second overall at the 1972 Macau Grand Prix (saloon car), and third overall the following year. Ramirez was named Best Southeast Asian driver during the 1978 and 1979 runs of the Macau Grand Prix.

In 1995, Ramirez established the Subic International Raceway at Zambales. The racetrack at Subic soon became the haven of hundreds of race car drivers who would train there, and would eventually host several international and local racing events.

Ramirez raced competitively until around 2008, when he was 75 and already battling cancer. In 2000, he was the Blaze Super Saloon Champion. Shortly before his death, Ramirez was inducted by the Automobile Association Philippines into its Hall of Fame.

== Personal life ==
He is survived by his wife, Ellen, and children José André "Kookie", Georges, Louis, Michelle and Miguel.

== In media ==
Ramirez was the long-time co-anchor (together with Butch Gamboa) of the racing show Motoring Today, which aired on the People's Television Network.

In 2005, Ramirez gained renewed popularity when he appeared in a popular advertisement for Petron, taking on a driving challenge that required him to traverse 1,114 kilometers across the Philippines on one full tank of gas. His tag line, "Traffic? Bring it on!" became popular and was widely imitated.
