= James Winslow =

British racing driver (born 1983)

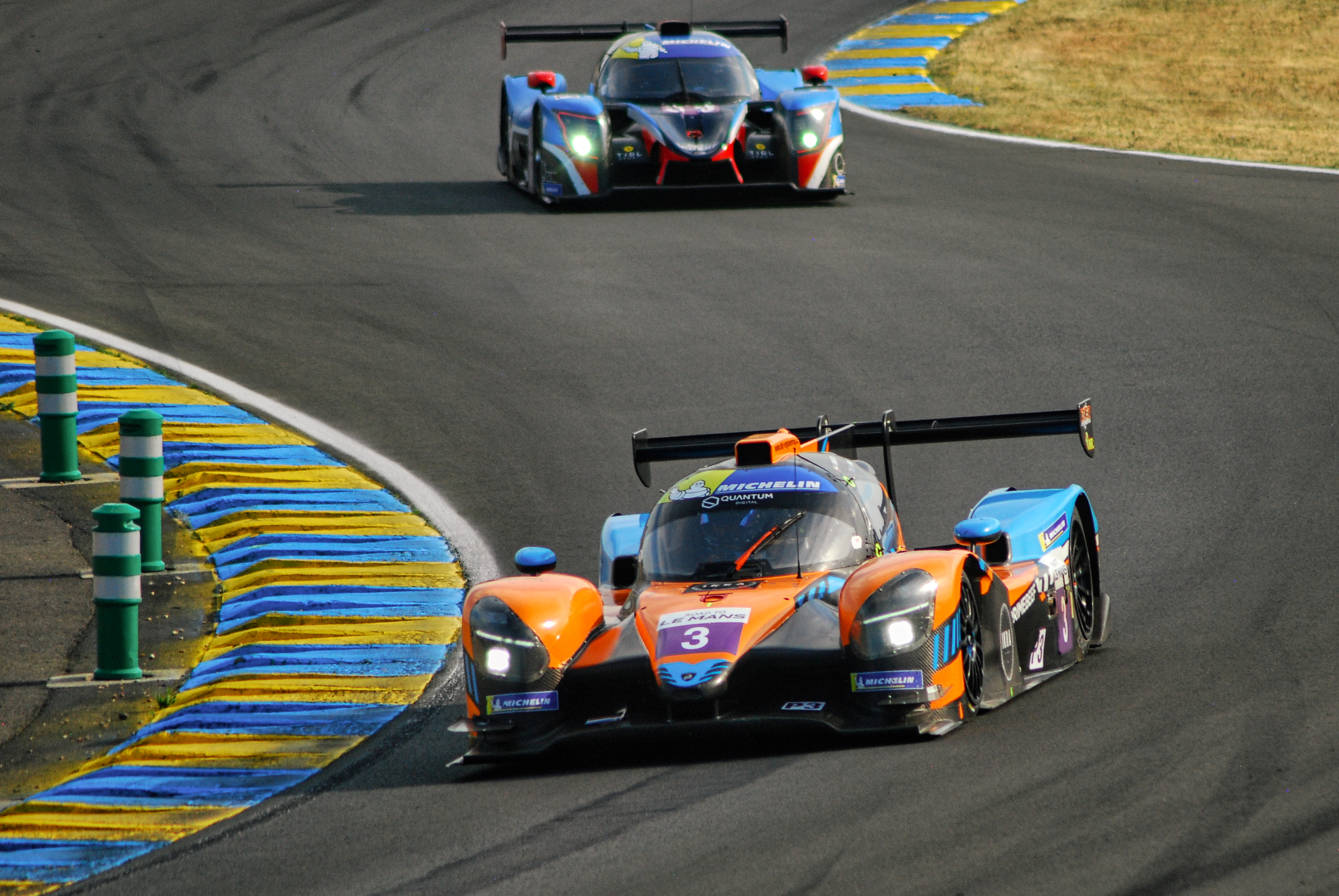
- Nationality: (United Kingdom) British
- Born: 16 April 1983 (age 43) Witham, England

Le Mans 24H & LMP Racing career
- Debut season: 2013
- Current team: Inter Europol Competition LMP2
- Categorisation: FIA Gold (until 2013); FIA Silver (2014–)
- Former teams: Jackie Chan DC Racing; Graff Racing; Greaves Motorsport; Craft-Bamboo Racing; KCMG; Eurasia Motorsport
- Starts: 94
- Wins: 22
- Poles: 31

Previous series
- 2010–11 2009 2009 2007 2005–06: Indy Lights; Atlantic Championship; Development V8 Supercar; Formula V6 Asia; Asian F3

Championship titles
- 2004 British ARP F3 Champion; 2006 Asian Formula 3 Champion; 2007 Formula Renault V6 Champion; 2008 Australian Formula 3 Champion; 2012 Australian Formula 3 Champion; 2013-14 Asian Le Mans Series Vice-Champion; 2014 Australian GT Championship Vice-Champion; 2016 Asian Le Mans Sprint Champion; 2016-17 Asian Le Mans Series Vice-Champion; 2016 Gulf 12 Hours Winner; 2017 FRD LMP3 Series Champion; 2018 Gulf 12 Hours Winner; 2019 FRD LMP3 Series Champion; 2019 China Endurance Championship Champion; 2023-24 Asian Le Mans Series Champion

Awards
- Royal Humane Society Award; Autosport Gregor Grant Award; BRDC Innes Ireland Award; CAMS Gold Star Winner; CAMS Gold Star Winner

James Winslow (born 16 April 1983) is a British professional car racing driver who races at Le Mans 24 Hours. A ten-time Motorsport champion member of the British Racing Drivers' Club, he competes in Europe, Australia & Asia in Le Mans LMP & GT cars. He represented Great Britain in A1 Grand Prix the World Cup of Motorsport. Awarded the Royal Humane Award in 2007 by Queen Elizabeth II, for saving the life of a fellow driver trapped in his burning race car, he gained international attention and many bravery awards followed before featuring in the BBC's 'Accidental Heroes' TV Series. He currently holds the record for the most Formula 3 open-wheeler wins after a tally of 86 victories, and ranked in the Top 10 'Most Victories of all time' listings for British drivers.

== Racing career ==
=== 2004–2008 ===
In 2004, Winslow won the British ARP Formula 3 Championship in 2004, winning ten races driving an older model car. He then went on and won the Asian Formula Three Championship and also won the Australia Grand Prix Formula 3 support race in 2006 beating Bruno Senna and Tim Macrow. In 2007, he won races in both the Australian Formula Three Championship and the Formula V6 Asia championships. In September 2007, he took part in a Champ Car test at Sebring International Raceway with a view to securing a full-time drive in 2008, but the series ultimately folded.

Winslow, driving for Team Meritus, won the Formula Asia V6 Championship at the last round of the season in Zhuhai, China, beating Armaan Ebrahim. Winslow had the chance to test drive a World Series by Renault race car at Paul Ricard test track on 8 and 9 November 2007 as the prize for winning the championship. He returned to the Australian Formula 3 for 2008 winning six times and taking the overall championship at the final round. He also won the final of the three the Formula 3 showcase races on the streets of Surfers Paradise in support of the Nikon Indy 300 IndyCar race.

=== 2009–2010 ===
Winslow then participated as a "Rookie Driver" for A1 Team Great Britain in A1 Grand Prix with a best result of second. In 2009, Winslow drove in the American Atlantic Championship series for four different teams (primarily Genoa Racing) where his best result was third and finished sixth after missing two events without a DNF.

For 2010, Winslow signed with Sam Schmidt Motorsports to drive in the Firestone Indy Lights series; a development category sanctioned by the Indy Racing League. Winslow made six starts for the team from twelve rounds, all on road and street courses, and finished 14th in points with a best finish of third at Watkins Glen.

=== 2011 ===
The start of the 2011 Indy Lights season saw Winslow drive for Andretti Autosport for the opening four rounds of the 2011 Indy Lights season championship at St. Petersburg and Barber Motorsports Park.

At the St Petersburg race, which was Winslow's first time in the Andretti Autosport car, he ran well through the weekend, but mayhem early in the race saw him suffer damage to the front wing while running third, which forced him to pit and finish tenth.

At the Barber Motorsports Park race, Winslow ran third for the duration of the fifty-minute race until after a caution period he was hit from behind on the restart and forced to retire.

The Long Beach event was Winslow's best race with Andretti Autosport running first in practice and qualified at the front after a nasty accident in qualifying. Winslow ran well in the race and after an eventful race come home in fourth position. The Freedom 100 was the final race of Winslow's 2011 season in Indy Lights. He qualified fifth but crashed out of the forty lap race on lap twenty in what would be his first and only oval start.

=== 2012 ===
The start of the 2012 season saw Winslow join a new team R-Tek Motorsport in the Australian Formula 3 Championship for a full season. Winslow won twelve races, breaking the record for the most wins in a single season in the 57-year history of the Australian Gold Star Awarded series and went on to dominate the Australian Formula 3 series winning the Championship for a second time at Queensland Raceway with a clean sweep of pole position, 3 race wins and a new lap record.

== Outside racing ==
Winslow was featured on BBC One TV programme Accidental Heroes on 25 September 2008, for his rescue of former rival in the Asian Formula Three Championship Moreno Suprapto, after the two collided in a round of the championship, at Sentul in Indonesia.

== Racing record ==
=== Complete A1 Grand Prix results ===
(key) (Races in bold indicate pole position) (Races in italics indicate fastest lap)

| Year | Entrant | 1 | 2 | 3 | 4 | 5 | 6 | 7 | 8 | 9 | 10 | 11 | 12 | 13 | 14 | 15 | 16 | 17 | 18 | 19 | 20 | DC | Points |
|---|---|---|---|---|---|---|---|---|---|---|---|---|---|---|---|---|---|---|---|---|---|---|---|
| 2007–08 | Great Britain | NED; SPR | NED; FEA | CZE; SPR | CZE; FEA | MYS; SPR | MYS; FEA | ZHU; SPR | ZHU; FEA | NZL; SPR; PO | NZL; FEA; PO | AUS; SPR; PO | AUS; FEA; PO | RSA; SPR | RSA; FEA | MEX; SPR | MEX; FEA | SHA; SPR | SHA; FEA | GBR; SPR; PO | GBR; SPR; PO | **3rd** | **126** |
| 2008–09 | Great Britain | NED; SPR | NED; FEA | CHN; SPR | CHN; FEA | MYS; SPR | MYS; FEA | NZL; SPR; PO | NZL; FEA; PO | RSA; SPR; PO | RSA; FEA; PO | POR; SPR | POR; FEA | GBR; SPR | GBR; SPR | | | | | | | 10th | 28 |

=== American open–wheel racing results ===
(key)

==== Atlantic Championship ====
| Year | Team | 1 | 2 | 3 | 4 | 5 | 6 | 7 | 8 | 9 | 10 | 11 | 12 | Rank | Points |
|---|---|---|---|---|---|---|---|---|---|---|---|---|---|---|---|
| 2009 | Conquest Racing | SEB; 8 | | | | | | | | | | | | **8th** | **72** |
| 2009 | Jensen MotorSport | | UTA; 8 | | | | | | | | | | | **8th** | **72** |
| 2009 | Genoa Racing | | | NJ1; 9 | NJ2; 9 | LIM; 7 | ACC1; 8 | ACC2; 9 | MOH; 6 | TRR; 7 | MOS | ATL; 7 | LS; 7 | **8th** | **72** |

==== Indy Lights ====
| Year | Team | 1 | 2 | 3 | 4 | 5 | 6 | 7 | 8 | 9 | 10 | 11 | 12 | 13 | 14 | Rank | Points | Ref |
|---|---|---|---|---|---|---|---|---|---|---|---|---|---|---|---|---|---|---|
| 2010 | Sam Schmidt Motorsports | STP; 7 | ALA; 15 | LBH; 12 | INDY | IOW | WGL; 5 | TOR; 11 | EDM; DNP | MOH; 9 | SNM | CHI | KTY | HMS | | **14th** | **130** | |
| 2011 | Andretti Autosport | STP; 10 | ALA; 10 | LBH; 5 | INDY; 17 | MIL | IOW | TOR | EDM1 | EDM2 | TRO | NHM | BAL | KTY | LVS | **19th** | **83** | |

=== Complete 24 Hours of Le Mans results ===
| Year | Team | Co-drivers | Car | Class | Laps | Pos. | Class pos. |
|---|---|---|---|---|---|---|---|
| 2014 | (United Kingdom) Greaves Motorsport | (United Kingdom) Michael Munemann (United Kingdom) Alessandro Latif | Zytek Z11SN-Nissan | LMP2 | 31 | DNF | DNF |
| 2016 | (Switzerland) Race Performance | (Switzerland) Nicolas Leutwiler (Japan) Shinji Nakano | Oreca 03R-Judd | LMP2 | 289 | 44th | 17th |
| 2017 | (France) Graff | (France) Eric Trouillet (France) Enzo Guibbert | Oreca 07-Gibson | LMP2 | 318 | 43rd | 18th |
| 2019 | (Poland) Inter Europol Competition | (Poland) Jakub Śmiechowski (United Kingdom) Nigel Moore | Ligier JS P217-Gibson | LMP2 | 325 | 45th | 16th |
| 2021 | (Philippines) Racing Team India Eurasia | (Belgium) Tom Cloet (Australia) John Corbett | Ligier JS P217-Gibson | LMP2 | 338 | 28th | 16th |
| 2021 | (Philippines) Racing Team India Eurasia | (Belgium) Tom Cloet (Australia) John Corbett | Ligier JS P217-Gibson | LMP2 Pro-Am | 338 | 28th | 7th |

=== Complete Asian Le Mans Series results ===
(key) (Races in bold indicate pole position) (Races in italics indicate fastest lap)

| Year | Team | Class | Car | Engine | 1 | 2 | 3 | 4 | 5 | 6 | Pos. | Points |
|---|---|---|---|---|---|---|---|---|---|---|---|---|
| 2013 | KCMG | LMP2 | Morgan LMP2 | Nissan VK45DE 4.5 L V8 | INJ; 1 | FUJ; 1 | | **SEP**; 2 | | | 2nd | 87 |
| 2013 | KCMG | LMP2 | Oreca 03 | Nissan VK45DE 4.5 L V8 | | | ZHU; 2 | | | | 2nd | 87 |
| 2014 | Eurasia Motorsport | LMP2 | Oreca 03 | Nissan VK45DE 4.5 L V8 | INJ | FUJ | SHA; 2 | SEP; 2 | | | 3rd | 36 |
| 2015–16 | Algarve Pro Racing | LMP2 | Ligier JS P2 | Nissan VK45DE 4.5 L V8 | FUJ | **SEP**; 2 | BUR; 2 | **SEP**; 3 | | | 2nd | 53 |
| 2016–17 | Jackie Chan DC Racing | LMP3 | Ligier JS P3 | Nissan VK50 5.0 L V8 | ZHU; 1 | FUJ; 3 | BUR; 6 | SEP; 3 | | | 2nd | 63 |
| 2017–18 | Viper Niza Racing | LMP3 | Ligier JS P3 | Nissan VK50 5.0 L V8 | ZHU | FUJ; 2 | BUR | SEP | | | 8th | 18 |
| 2018–19 | Jackie Chan DC Racing X Jota Sport | LMP3 | Ligier JS P3 | Nissan VK50 5.0 L V8 | SHA | FUJ | BUR | SEP; 10 | | | 15th | 1 |
| 2019–20 | Inter Europol Endurance | LMP2 | Ligier JS P217 | Gibson GK428 4.2 L V8 | SHA; 4 | BEN; Ret | SEP; 5 | BUR; 7 | | | 5th | 28 |
| 2023 | Inter Europol Competition | LMP3 | Ligier JS P320 | Nissan VK56DE 5.6L V8 | DUB 1; 5 | DUB 2; 7 | ABU 1; 10 | ABU 2; 5 | | | 7th | 27 |
| 2023–24 | Cool Racing | LMP3 | Ligier JS P320 | Nissan VK56DE 5.6L V8 | SEP 1; 1 | SEP 2; 3 | **DUB**; 1 | **ABU 1**; 2 | **ABU 2**; 2 | | 1st | 104 |
| 2024–25 | Graff Racing | LMP3 | Ligier JS P320 | Nissan VK56DE 5.6L V8 | SEP 1; 3 | SEP 2 Ret | DUB 1 | DUB 2 | ABU 1 | ABU 2 | 5th* | 15* |

^{*} Season still in progress.

=== Complete European Le Mans Series results ===
| Year | Entrant | Class | Chassis | Engine | 1 | 2 | 3 | 4 | 5 | 6 | Rank | Points |
|---|---|---|---|---|---|---|---|---|---|---|---|---|
| 2015 | Algarve Pro Racing | LMP2 | Ligier JS P2 | Nissan VK45DE 4.5 L V8 | SIL | IMO | RBR; 10 | LEC; 8 | EST; 7 | | 17th | 11 |
| 2016 | Race Performance | LMP2 | Oreca 03R | Judd HK 3.6 L V8 | SIL; 6 | IMO; 9 | | | | | 26th | 10 |
| 2016 | Graff | LMP3 | Ligier JS P3 | Nissan VK45DE 4.5 L V8 | | | RBR; 4 | LEC | SPA | EST | 19th | 12 |
| 2019 | 360 Racing | LMP3 | Ligier JS P3 | Nissan VK45DE 4.5 L V8 | LEC; 11 | MNZ; 8 | CAT; 13 | SIL; 6 | SPA; 12 | ALG | 16th | 13.5 |
| 2022 | DKR Engineering | LMP3 | Duqueine M30 - D08 | Nissan VK56DE 5.6L V8 | LEC | IMO | MNZ; 8 | CAT | SPA | ALG | 21st | 4 |
| 2023 | DKR Engineering | LMP3 | Ligier JS P320 | Nissan VK56DE 5.6 L V8 | CAT; 10 | IMO; 5 | LEC; 8 | ARA; 7 | SPA; 3 | ALG; 3 | 6th | 51 |

=== Complete Le Mans Cup results ===
(key) (Races in bold indicate pole position; results in italics indicate fastest lap)

| Year | Entrant | Class | Chassis | 1 | 2 | 3 | 4 | 5 | 6 | 7 | Rank | Points |
|---|---|---|---|---|---|---|---|---|---|---|---|---|
| 2025 | 23Events Racing | LMP3 Pro-Am | Ligier JS P325 | CAT | LEC | LMS; 1 | LMS; 2 | SPA; 8 | SIL; 1 | ALG | 8th | 31 |
| 2026 | Bretton Racing | LMP3 | Ligier JS P325 | CAT | LEC | LMS; 17 | SPA | | | | 42nd | 0 |
| 2026 | Inter Europol Competition | LMP3 Pro-Am | Ligier JS P325 | | | | | **SIL**; 7 | ALG | | 16th | 7 |

* Season still in progress.

Sporting positions
| Preceded by Karun Chandhok | Formula V6 Asia champion 2007 | Succeeded by James Grunwell |
| Preceded by Tim Macrow | Winner of the Australian Drivers' Championship; 2008 | Succeeded by Joey Foster |
| Preceded by Chris Gilmour | Winner of the Australian Drivers' Championship; 2012 | Succeeded by Tim Macrow |
