= Mark Goddard (racing driver) =

Mark Goddard is the current Team Principal of Eurasia Motorsport and is a former racing driver. He is also the team proprietor of Eurasia Motorsport. The team raced in Formula BMW Asia, Formula V6 Asia and the Asian Formula Three Championship.

== History ==
Goddard competed in Formula Ford in the UK, finishing third in the 1984 Esso Formula Ford Championship. He graduated to British Formula 3, finishing third in the B Class series in 1985. He went on to race and win in the British Formula Forward Championship, TVR Tuscan Challenge and Production GT. He also finished second in the Benelux Opel Lotus Championship, competed in several British Touring Cars Races winning the 1600cc Class at Donington Park. He also raced in the 1987 British Renault 5 Turbo Championship.

Goddard was the Chief Instructor at the Silverstone Motor Racing School.

In 1992, Goddard became the first modern F1 Safety Car Driver at the Silverstone GP, albeit the car was not used in the race. He also drove the Safety Car at the European Grand Prix in 1993 at Donington Park and at the 1993 Silverstone GP, the Safety Car being used there for the second time in that year.

In 1994, Goddard moved to Asia to help manage the new Formula Asia Championship before moving to the Philippines in 1996 to manage the Shell Toyota Alabang Formula Toyota and Corolla Cup teams, winning both championships. In 1997, he was asked to manage and drive for the TOTAL Toyota Alabang Team in Formula Toyota, leading the championship before been forced to miss the final round due to injury.

Goddard moved to China in 1999 to manage the Ghiasports Racing Team where he oversaw the running of the China Formula 2000 and Toyota Altezza Series. The team also won the HKAA Touring Csr Championship. Goddard drove in the 1999 and 2000 AF2000 Championship, finishing second in the championship in both years.

Goddard won the Asian Formula Three Championship in 2002, driving for his own team with support from Castrol.
