= Greenhills, San Juan =

Barangay in San Juan, Metro Manila, Philippines

Greenhills
- Barangay
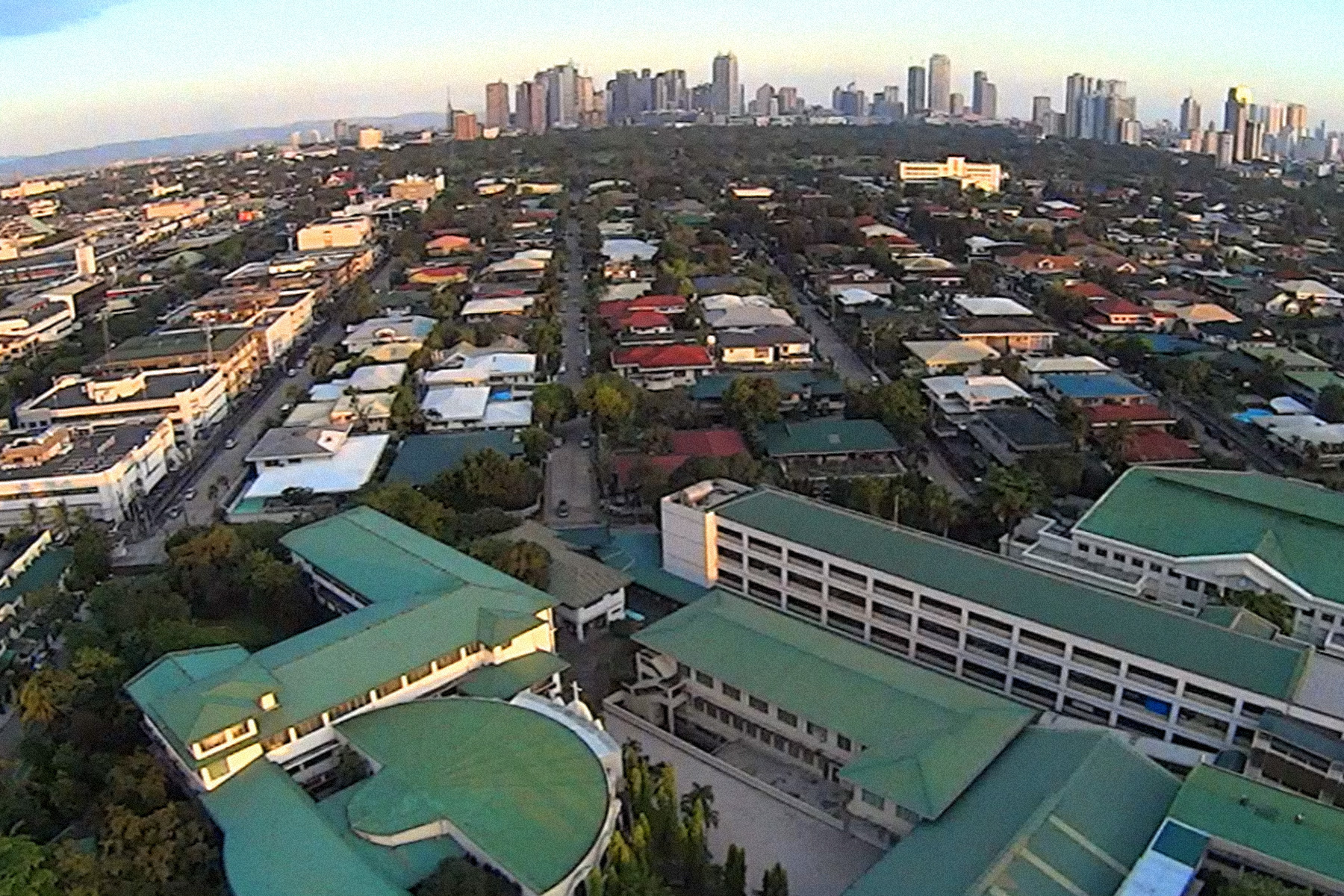
- Aerial view of the Greenhills West subdivision in 2013

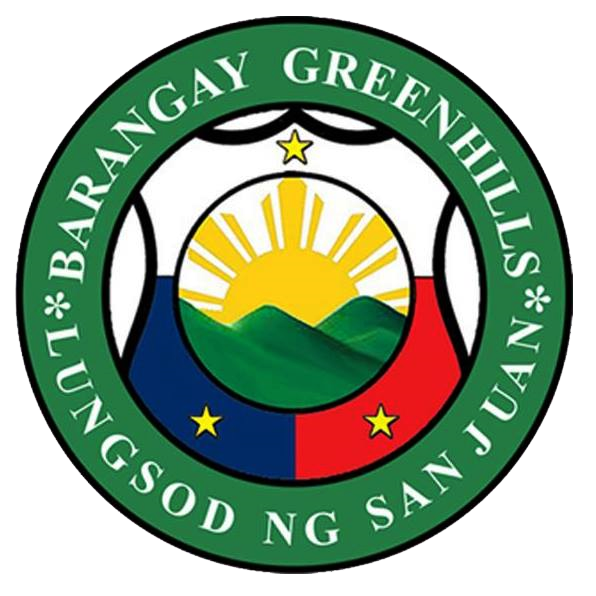
- Seal
- Interactive map of Greenhills
- Location within Metro Manila
- Coordinates: 14°36′06″N 121°02′48″E
- Country: Philippines
- Region: National Capital Region
- City: San Juan
- District: 2nd District of San Juan
- Established: 1972
- Named for: Greenhills, Ohio, United States

Government
  - Type: Barangay
  - Barangay captain: Alan T. Yam

Area
  - Total: 2.08 km^{2} (0.80 sq mi)

Population (2020)
  - Total: 15,212
  - Density: 7,313/km^{2} (18,940/sq mi)
- Time zone: UTC+8 (PST)
- ZIP Code: 1503 (Greenhills North); 1502 (Greenhills Post Office)
- Area Code: 2
- PSGC: 137405021
- Website: Facebook

Greenhills is an urban barangay in San Juan, Metro Manila, Philippines. It is the largest barangay in San Juan, covering a total area of 2.09 square kilometers (209 ha) and spanning over a third of San Juan's total land area.

Centered and named after the Greenhills Shopping Center and its adjacent commercial establishments and gated communities, Barangay Greenhills is considered as a major commercial center of the city and of Metro Manila at large.

The area was initially part of the Hacienda de Mandaluyon (Mandaluyong Estate), the estate holdings of the Augustinian Order. The land was later on sold to businessmen Don Francisco Ortigas and Phil Whitaker, who founded Ortigas & Company, which developed the area into multiple residential subdivisions and its centerpiece shopping center, to which it is known for today.

== History ==
=== Mandaluyong Estate ===
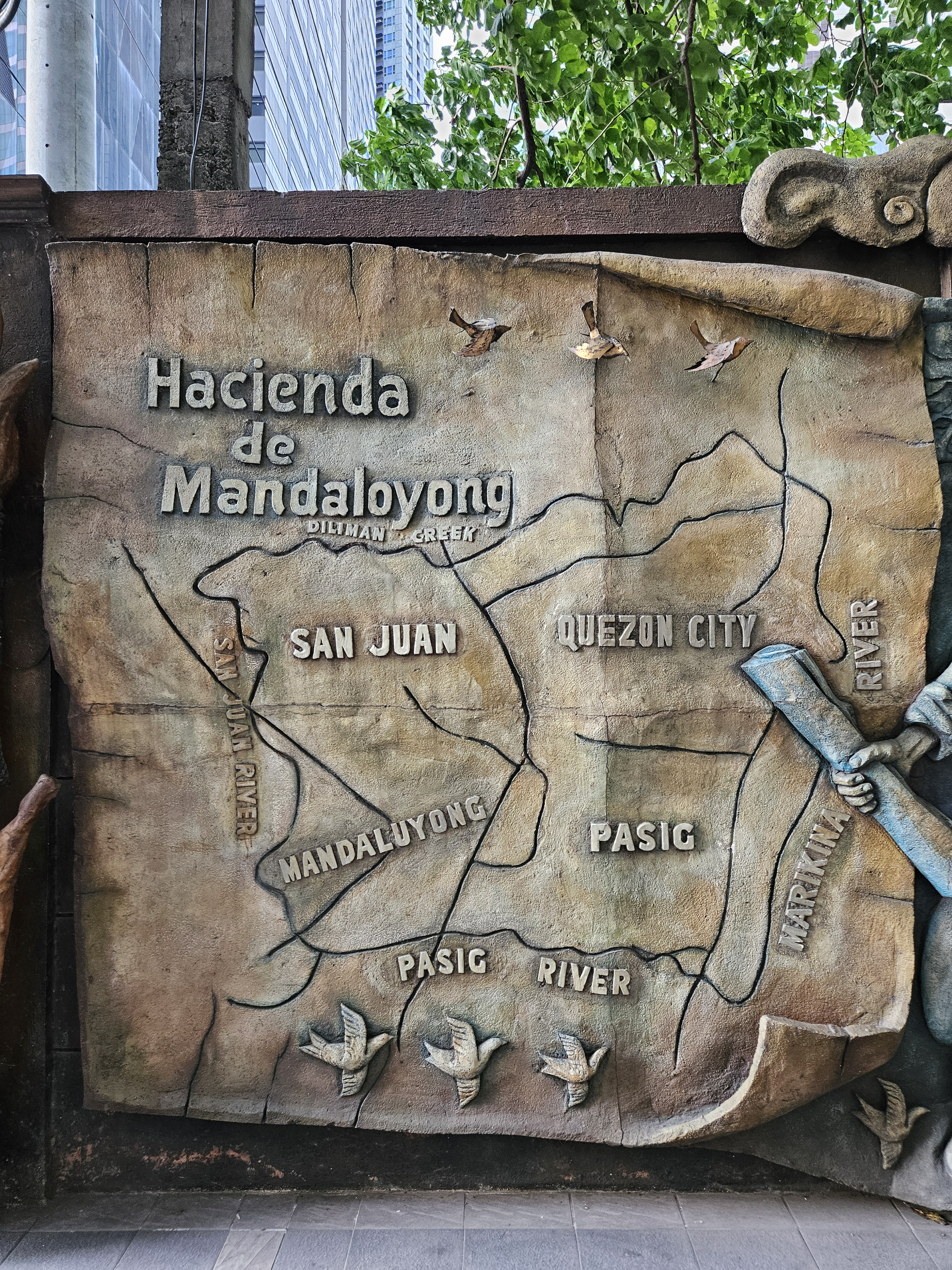
Map of the Hacienda de Mandaloyon on a mural at Ortigas Park in Ortigas Center

During the Spanish colonial era, the area that would become known as Greenhills was part of the Hacienda de Mandaloyon (also known as Mandaloya, Mandaloyen, Mandaloyong, or Mandaloya), the estate holdings (haciendas) of the Augustinian Order, consisting of 4,033 hectares (40.33 km^{2}) of sparsely inhabited rice fields and wild grasslands that now span the cities of San Juan, Mandaluyong, Quezon City, and Pasig.

The transfer of the Philippines to American rule in 1898 posed several challenges for the American colonial government, one of which was the issue of friar lands, as these religious orders did not pay taxes to the government and refused to sell their lands of their own accord. In order to resolve this problem, the Taft Commission arranged with the Holy See to force the sale of the friar lands to the American colonial government, with the aim of making them available for public use. This led to the passage of Act No. 1120, also known as the Friar Lands Act of 1904, which facilitated the transfer of 166,000 hectares (1,660 km^{2}) of friar lands to the American government, which were later sold to private businesses and wealthy individuals.

As such, the Hacienda de Mandaluyon estate was sold to businessmen Dr. Frank W. Dudley and Don Francisco Ortigas. Dr. Dudley later sold his interest in the estate to Phil C. Whitaker, who with Ortigas founded the company Whitaker and Ortigas. The company would rename itself to Ortigas & Company, as it is known today. The company divided the land into residential subdivision developments now known as Capitol (Kapitolyo), Wack-Wack, Greenhills, Valle Verde and Greenmeadows. Maps in the 1940s show that the area of the present-day Greenhills West was known as San Juan Heights Subdivision. Once part of Quezon City, what is now Greenhills became part of the City of Greater Manila under the Balintawak district from 1941 to 1945.

=== Development of Greenhills ===
The growth of suburban residential developments in the 1960s is attributed to middle-class and upper-class populations seeking refuge from the busy, urban climate of Manila. With the success of emerging middle-class residential enclaves such as the PhilAm Life Homes (now PhilAm) in Quezon City and several villages in Makati, which were located along Highway 54 (now EDSA), new residential subdivisions would be developed in the areas between such villages, such as White Plains, Blue Ridge, and Wack-Wack. The developments were named after famous Greenbelt planned communities in the United States that were developed to allow for the dispersal of the American population in an effort to minimize losses from possible attacks with weapons of mass destruction during the Cold War.

During this time, Ortigas & Company drafted plans to develop a planned community on the west side of Highway 54, centered around plans for schools, churches, and a centerpiece suburban shopping complex following years of studying planned communities in other countries. The new residential subdivision was named Greenhills, after the suburban Greenbelt community of Greenhills in the US state of Ohio. The area was then considered part of Quezon City as of the 1970s and was eventually returned to San Juan, which previously had jurisdiction over it prior to the establishment of Quezon City.

The newly-opened Greenhills subdivision covered 197 hectares (1.97 km^{2}) of land, which would become divided further into distinct residential subdivisions known as North Greenhills, Greenhills West, and Greenhills East. In 1959, the De La Salle Brothers (now De La Salle Philippines) purchased a 6 hectares (0.060 km^{2}) property along Ortigas Avenue, establishing La Salle Green Hills. A year later, the Jesuits purchased a few hectares of land in Little Baguio adjacent to Greenhills as a new location for its Xavier School in 1960, which was then situated along Echague Street in Manila. Of this, 5,000 square meters (0.50 ha) were allocated for the Mary the Queen Parish Church, which moved from its original chapel at Zamora Street in Pasay City in 1963, as well as Immaculate Concepcion Academy-Greenhills, run by the Missionary Sisters of the Immaculate Conception, which moved into the area after transferring from its previous campus in Intramuros, Manila. This was followed by plans in 1966 to construct a shopping center in what would become the Greenhills Shopping Center.

In the 1990s, parts of Greenhills were rezoned as commercial zones, which brought upon commercial development around the Greenhills Shopping Center. A Chili's branch, the second in the country, was opened in 1998 along Missouri Street.

==== Establishment of Barangay Greenhills ====
The Greenhills subdivisions were originally located in Mapuntod, a traditional barrio of San Juan, which was a municipality then part of Rizal until it was incorporated into Metro Manila in 1975 through Presidential Decree No. 824. Prior to 1972, the Greenhills subdivisions were part of the San Juan barrios of West Crame, Addition Hills, and Little Baguio. This was until a petition was made by 278 residents of the Greenhills subdivisions seeking to carve out a new barrio consisting of the Greenhills subdivisions in 1971.

On January 27, 1972, the San Juan Municipal Council approved the creation of Barrio Greenhills through Municipal Resolution No. 42 series of 1972. Following this, the boundaries of West Crame, Addition Hills, and Little Baguio were redefined in Municipal Resolution No. 43 series of 1972. In 1974, Philippine president Ferdinand Marcos Sr. signed Presidential Decree No. 557, renaming all barrios nationwide into barangays. As a result, Barrio Greenhills was renamed as Barangay Greenhills, as it is known today.

==== Establishment of homeowner associations ====
In 1972, during the Martial Law period under the second term of President Ferdinand Marcos, Ortigas & Company began setting up homeowner associations for each of its Greenhills subdivisions.

In North Greenhills, the North Greenhills Association (NGA) was founded in December 1972 with journalist and television show host Max Soliven elected as the NGA's first president, and businessman Ray Lorenzana and ears, nose, and throat specialist Dr. Tony Perez serving as its vice presidents. The elections were conducted in a meeting with the subdivision's residents.

Throughout 1973, the association established a modus vivendi with Ortigas and Company, setting up perimeter walls, guard posts, and gates, transforming North Greenhills into a gated community. Maintenance costs were later turned over to the association in 1975.

=== Greenhills Grand Prix ===
From 1971 to 1976, Greenhills was home to the Greenhills Grand Prix, an international motor race. The then-empty streets of the North Greenhills subdivision and a part of Ortigas Avenue served as its 3.2-kilometer (2.0 mi) circuit track, with the eastbound service road along Ortigas Avenue serving as its pit stop.

=== Arrest of Joseph Estrada ===
In 2001, following the failed impeachment trial of President Joseph Estrada and the Second EDSA Revolution that followed, Estrada resigned from office on the afternoon of January 20, 2001. This was followed with charges of plunder and perjury being filed against him at the Sandiganbayan, which were initially brought up at the failed impeachment trial. On April 24, 2001, the Sandiganbayan had ordered the arrest of Estrada, his son San Juan mayor Jinggoy Estrada, and other individuals involved in charges of plunder and graft.

As a result, thousands of loyalists of Estrada had mobilized to Greenhills, using jeepneys and human barricades to block the police and military forces from arresting the former president, who lived inside the North Greenhills subdivision. The arrest warrant was eventually served the next day on April 25, 2001, as Estrada and his son Jinggoy were arrested and brought to Camp Crame for detention and processing. In jail, Estrada made a statement maintaining his innocence and denounced the Arroyo government's efforts to persecute him as a "violation of his human rights". The statement instigated loyalists to converge upon Camp Crame and EDSA, sparking the EDSA III riots from April 25 to 30, 2001.

=== Proposed opening of Greenhills subdivisions ===
On July 23, 2019, following President Rodrigo Duterte's plea to government officials to reclaim public roads being used for "private ends", Department of Interior and Local Government secretary Eduardo Año floated the idea of opening up the roads of gated communities to improve traffic flow during rush hours. Following this, San Juan mayor Francis Zamora stated that even though he himself lives in one of Greenhills' gated communities, he would be willing to fight for the proposal to open up these communities if it will help alleviate traffic flow in the city. However, no updates on this proposal have been reported since then.

Days later, on July 26, 2019, Zamora signed Executive Order No. 4, prohibiting on-street parking along Club Filipino Avenue and the Annapolis, Missouri, and Connecticut Streets from 6 a.m. to 9 p.m. PHT. This repeals a city ordinance and executive order under the previous administration of Guia Gomez, which allowed one-side parking on the mentioned roads.

=== COVID-19 pandemic ===
In March 2020, the first two confirmed locally transmitted cases of COVID-19 in the Philippines were reported in Greenhills. The first case was a 62-year-old Filipino man from Cainta that regularly visited the Greenhills Masjid, a mosque within the Greenhills Shopping Center. It was believed that the man had contracted COVID-19 from another individual at the mosque. The disease was passed on to his wife, who became the second local case.

Due to this, the mosque was ordered closed by the San Juan city government and the entire shopping center was ordered to be disinfected and sanitized. The announcement of local transmission of COVID-19 in the area also caused many people to avoid the shopping center and the Greenhills vicinity in fear of catching the disease.

== Geography ==
Greenhills and the adjacent West Crame are the only barangays in San Juan that are not entirely situated on tuff and tuffaceous sedimentary rock, with parts of the barangay being situated on top of pyroclastic flow adobe deposits. The highest elevation of San Juan can be found in Greenhills at its border with Quezon City's Barangay Camp Aguinaldo along EDSA, peaking at 34 meters (112 ft) above sea level.

=== Boundaries ===
The political borders of Greenhills are defined by the Ermitaño Creek, a tributary of the San Juan River, to which it borders the barangays of Addition Hills, Little Baguio, and Santa Lucia in San Juan to the west and the barangays of East Pasadeña and Corazon De Jesus to the northwest. It has land borders with Quezon City's Barangay Valencia to the northwest and Barangay West Crame to the northeast, Quezon City's Barangay Camp Aguinaldo to the east, and Mandaluyong's Barangay Wack Wack-Greenhills East to the southeast.

== Education ==
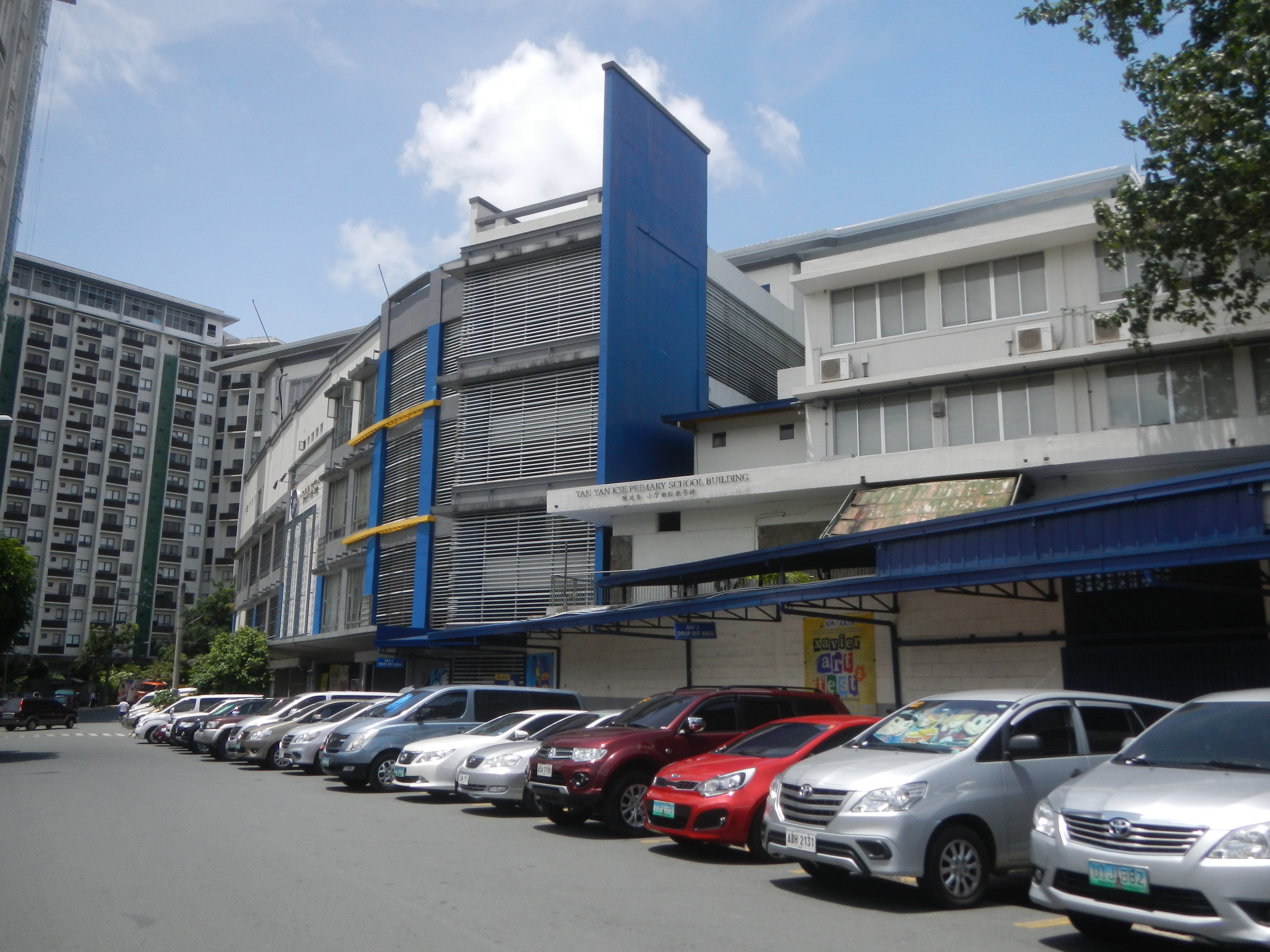
Xavier School

- Fountain International School
- Immaculate Conception Academy – Greenhills
- Operation Brotherhood (OB) Montessori
  - Instituto Culinario
- Xavier School

== Health ==
- Cardinal Santos Medical Center
- The Health Cube Medical Clinics
- The Medical City Clinic

== Landmarks ==
- Club Filipino
- Greenhills Shopping Center
  - Chapel of the Holy Family
  - Greenhills Masjid
  - Music Museum, a concert hall.
- Mary the Queen Parish Church
- Pacific Office Machines Building, a Brutalist building completed in 1975. It houses a KFC branch and has been nicknamed as the "Brutalist KFC".
- Primex Tower, a 50-storey mixed-use skyscraper at the corner of EDSA and Connecticut Street.

== Subdivisions ==
- Greenhills West
- North Greenhills
- Northeast Greenhills
- Greenhills East

== Transport ==
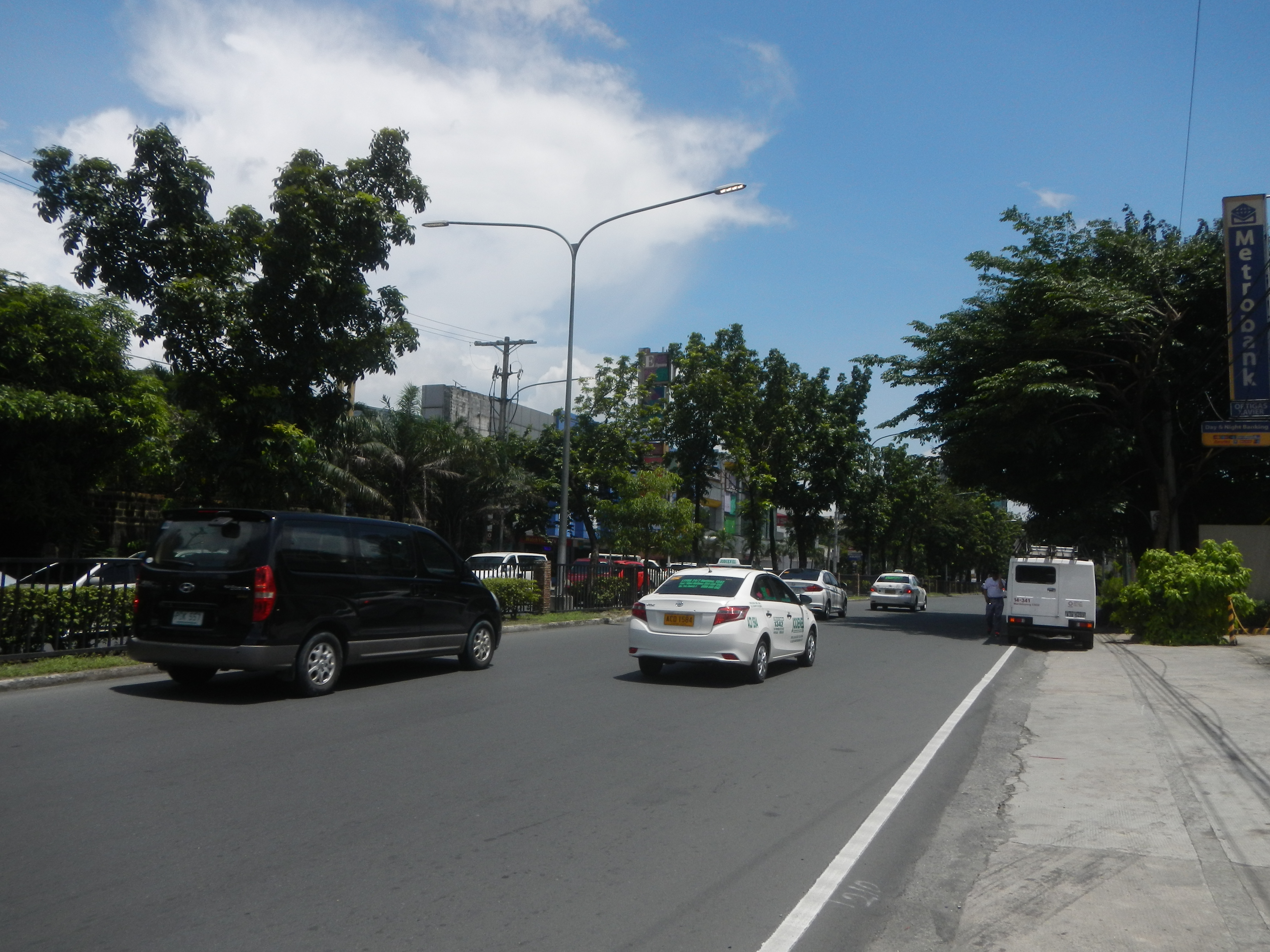
Ortigas Avenue in Greenhills

=== Roads ===
The six-lane Ortigas Avenue serves as a main thoroughfare for Greenhills, spanning the barangay from end to end, while the four-lane Bonny Serrano Avenue (also known as Santolan Road, and further northwest as Pinaglabanan Street) encircles the barangay's perimeter. The four-lane Wilson Street in Greenhills connects Ortigas Avenue to other adjacent barangays in San Juan, as well as Mandaluyong. The two-to-four lane Annapolis Street and Connecticut Street are commercialized areas, as well as roads parallel to Ortigas Avenue, connecting the Greenhills Shopping Center to EDSA.

In 2024, the San Juan City government opened a connector road between Eisenhower Street and 3rd West Crame Street, linking Greenhills to Barangay West Crame.

One-way bicycle lanes with paint separation are present along Ortigas Avenue and Bonny Serrano Avenue as part of the Metropolitan Bike Lane Network and along Wilson Street. From 2020 to 2023, the section of Ortigas Avenue within Greenhills had physical protection using bollards and motorcycle lanes next to its bicycle lanes. During the COVID-19 pandemic, the Greenhills development had a cycling route dubbed as the Greenhills Active Playground, consisting of painted bicycle lanes along its driveways and along parts of Club Filipino Avenue, Eisenhower Street, and Annapolis Street.

=== Public transport routes ===
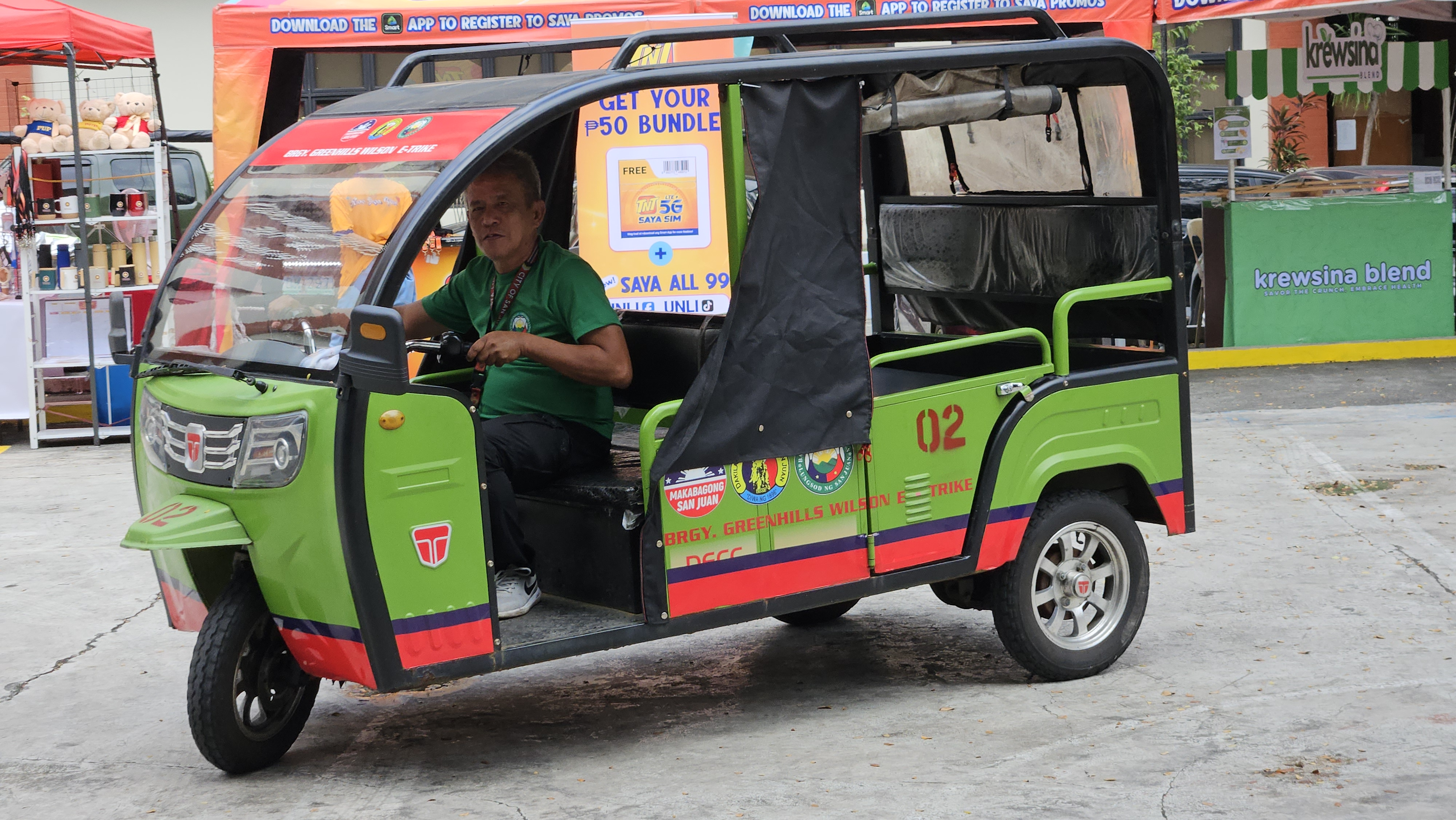
A DECC Vihari serving the Greenhills-Wilson e-trike route.

Greenhills is served by Bus Route 2 (Angono-Quiapo) and the SM East Ortigas - V. Mapa (formerly Rosario Junction - San Juan) jeepney route along Ortigas Avenue. The area and the Greenhills development are also served by the Gate 5 - Greenhills Shopping Center Loop jeepney route which provides access to the Santolan-Annapolis MRT station.

Greenhills was also previously served by two Premium Point-to-Point Bus Service (P2P): one connecting Greenhills to Antipolo, which ceased operations in 2023 and another linking Greenhills to Alabang Town Center, which ended in 2024.

Prior to 2020, the San Juan government operated a Wilson - P. Guevarra - Greenhills shuttle service using multicabs, connecting Greenhills to Addition Hills and Little Baguio. These were then replaced with e-trikes in 2020 until operations were suspended during the COVID-19 pandemic. In August 2024, the San Juan City Council passed City Ordinance No. 32 series of 2024, reviving the service as a tricycle route with a special franchise. It was launched in December 2024 as the Greenhills Wilson E-Trike with a fleet of ten e-trikes and stops at Unimart, Cardinal Santos Medical Center, G Square, and the PUP San Juan campus.

=== Railways ===
Greenhills is served by the Santolan–Annapolis and Ortigas stations of the MRT Line 3 and Gilmore Station of the LRT Line 2, although those are all located outside the city borders. However, the stations are connected to the barangay via bus and jeepney routes plying the stations.

The future MRT Line 4 has been approved and has plans to build two stations serving Greenhills, such as Greenhills and Bonny Serrano, and to traverse through the barangay.

=== Other corridors ===
A roofed pedestrian alley between The Eisenhower Condominium and One Kennedy Place condominiums along Eisenhower Street also connects the Greenhills area to Road 11 in the adjacent Barangay West Crame.

== Government ==
The seat of government of Greenhills is located at the Greenhills Multi-Purpose Building along Santolan Road, which was inaugurated on April 24, 2022. It was previously located at the Annapolis Wilshire Plaza along Annapolis Street, a 26-storey building constructed in 2013.

== Demographics ==
Barangay Greenhills is the second most-populated barangay in San Juan, with a population of 15,212 people according to the 2020 census, up from a population of 14,114 people in the 2015 census. The earliest record of Barangay Greenhills in the official population census can be found on the 1975 census, the same year that San Juan was transferred to Metro Manila from the province of Rizal.
