= Subic International Raceway =

Race track in the Philippines

- Location: Bataan, Philippines
- Coordinates: 14°47′52″N 120°16′26″E
- Operator: Sports Values Inc.
- Broke ground: 1993
- Opened: 1994
- Closed: July 2010; 16 years ago
- Major events: Asian F3 Series (2003–2004); Asian Touring Car Series (2000–2002); Formula Asia (1998–1999, 2001–2002); South East Asia Touring Car Zone Challenge (1998–1999); Asia Road Racing Championship (1997)

Full Circuit (2009–2010)
- Length: 2.900 km (1.802 mi)
- Turns: 15

Full Circuit (2005–2008)
- Length: 2.871 km (1.784 mi)
- Turns: 10

Full Circuit (2002–2004)
- Length: 3.000 km (1.864 mi)
- Turns: 17
- Race lap record: 1:11.014 ( (Republic of Ireland) John O'Hara, Dallara F303, 2004, F3)

Full Circuit (1994–2001)
- Length: 2.800 km (1.740 mi)
- Turns: 14
- Race lap record: 1:19.667 ( (Malaysia) Ng Wai Leong, Argo Formula Asia, 1998, Formula Asia)

Short Circuit (1994–2001)
- Length: 0.800 km (0.497 mi)
- Turns: 6

Subic International Raceway was a racing circuit at the Subic Freeport Zone in the Philippines. It was built in 1993, through the efforts of famed race car driver Pocholo Ramirez.

== History ==
The eruption of Mount Pinatubo in 1991 led to the United States abandoning their base in Subic. The Subic International Raceway was established at the site of the former Naval Air Station Cubi Point's refuelling area for fighter jets. Former Filipino race car driver Pocholo Ramirez with the help of other figures in Philippine racing including Mandy Eduque, Mike Potenciano, Macky Carapiet, Louis Camus, Freddy Masigan set up Sports Values Incorporated (SVI) so that they could convert the existing paved roads and taxiways into a racing circuit.

The Subic International Raceway was opened in 1994 with SVI initially only able to secure a three-month lease for the racing circuit's site. The lease was extended multiple times during the racing circuit's 17-year operation.

It gained approval from the Fédération Internationale de Motocyclisme (FIM) in 1997 and secured a grade four Fédération Internationale de l'Automobile (FIA) license in 1998 which certified the racing circuit's suitability for international automotive and motorcycle races including the Asian Touring Car Series and Formula 3 races. The racing circuit was also open to amateur racers.

Subic Bay has hosted South East Asia's Premier motorcycle, touring car and formula car events. The Marlboro Asia Pacific Road Racing Championship, Asian Festival of Speed (AFOS) featuring the Southeast Asian Touring Car Zone Challenge (SEATCZC) and the Asian Formula 2000 have all raced here, and it also hosted the Asian 1600 Touring Car Invitational Cup, the Philippine Japan Invitational Historic Car Races and the Hong Kong Classic Car Races. The major visitor to the track was the Asian F3 Series.

The racing circuit closed in July 2010 with the three-day "The Last Lap" held as the last racing event.

== Racing track ==
At the time of its closure, the Subic International Raceway had a total length of 2.900 km (1.802 mi) with 15 turns. It had long straights that allowed for a long and short circuit setup.

== Lap records ==
The fastest official race lap records at the Subic International Raceway are listed as:

Category	Time	Driver	Vehicle	Event
Full Circuit (2002–2004): 3.000 km (1.864 mi)
Formula Three	1:11.014	John O'Hara	Dallara F303	2004 Subic Asian F3 round
Full Circuit (1994–2001): 2.800 km (1.740 mi)
Formula Asia	1:19.667	Ng Wai Leong	Argo Formula Asia	1998 Subic Formula Asia round
Super Touring	1:22.512	Charles Kwan	BMW 320	1999 Subic SEATCZC round
Super 2000	1:28.278	Charles Kwan	BMW 320i	2000 Subic ATCC round
