= Philippines Grand Prix =

1970s open-wheel racing car motor race

- Greenhills Street Circuit

Race information
- First held: 1973
- Last held: 1976

The Philippines Grand Prix was an open-wheel racing car motor race, held during the 1970s as part of the martial law under Marcos regime. The race was first held in 1973 as Formula Atlantic expanded across the region, becoming Formula Pacific as it did so. The race was held on a 3.2 kilometers (2.0 mi) street circuit in Greenhills, San Juan, Metro Manila. The race attracted the stars of the time like Hong Kong racer John MacDonald and was included in the inaugural Rothmans International Grand Prix Trophy series in 1976. The 1976 Rothmans Trophy race was won by New Zealander Graeme Lawrence and the race was scheduled to take part in the 1977 series but was canceled. The race disappeared almost immediately afterward and motorsport ceased in the Philippines for almost 20 years.

== Winners of the Philippines Grand Prix ==
Year	Driver	Car	Location	Report
1973			Greenhills	Report
1974	(New Zealand) Graeme Lawrence	Surtees TS15	Greenhills	Report
1975	(Hong Kong) John MacDonald	Ralt-Ford	Greenhills	Report
1976	(New Zealand) Graeme Lawrence	March-Ford	Greenhills	Report
