= CAMS Rising Stars =

Australian motor racing group

CAMS Rising Stars is a motor racing team identity in which the Confederation of Australian Motor Sport assists the development of emerging young racing drivers. The team competes in the Australian Formula Ford Championship. There are two racing team which have been called CAMS Rising Stars.

- Borland Racing Developments - used the CAMS Rising Stars up until 2009.
- Minda Motorsport - awarded the contract to run CAMS Rising Stars for 2010 and beyond.
