= 2007 Australian Drivers' Championship =

Motor racing competition

Seasons
- ← 2006 2008 →

The 2007 Australian Drivers' Championship was a motor racing title for drivers of Formula 3 racing cars, with the winner awarded the 2007 CAMS Gold Star. The title, which was the 51st Australian Drivers' Championship, was awarded to the winner of the 2007 Australian Formula 3 Championship. The championship, which began on 4 February 2007 (at Eastern Creek Raceway) and finished on 4 November at Oran Park, consisted of 16 races at 8 rounds across 4 different states.

The 2007 championship was notable for being one of the most competitive Australian Drivers Championships in years, with seven different drivers from three countries scoring race wins and ten drivers achieving at least one top three race placing. Four drivers, Tim Macrow, Leanne Tander, Charlie Hollings and James Winslow, had a mathematical chance of winning the championship heading into the final round. Whilst Winslow did not compete at that round due to a clash with his Formula V6 Asia commitments, the remaining trio fought out the title with Macrow coming from four points behind to win the championship in the final race of the season.

== Classes ==
Competing cars were classified into one of three classes:

- The Championship Class, which was open to cars constructed in accordance with FIA Formula 3 regulations that applied between 1 January 1999 and 31 December 2004
- The National Class, which was open to cars constructed in accordance with FIA Formula 3 regulations that applied between 1 January 1999 and 31 December 2001
- The Trophy Class, which was open to cars constructed in accordance with FIA Formula 3 regulations that applied between 1 January 1995 and 31 December 1998

== Points System ==
Points were awarded on 20–15–12–10–8–6–4–3–2–1 basis to the top ten finishers in the Championship Class in each race. An additional point was awarded to the driver setting the Championship Class pole position in the qualifying session for each race and a further point was awarded to the driver setting the fastest Championship Class race lap in each race. The point for fastest race lap was only awarded if the driver was a classified finisher in that race.

Points for the National Class and the Trophy Class were awarded on the same basis as for the Championship Class.

== Teams and drivers ==
The following teams and drivers competed in championship.

Team	Class	Chassis	Engine	No	Driver
R-Tek Motorsport Services	Championship	Dallara F304	Mugen-Honda	2	(Australia) Mat Sofi
R-Tek Motorsport Services	National	Dallara F301	Mugen-Honda	59	(Australia) Jesse Wakeman
Team BRM	Championship	Dallara F304	Spiess-Opel	3	(Australia) Barton Mawer
Team BRM	Championship	Dallara F304	Spiess-Opel	4	(Italy) Marco Mapelli
Team BRM	Championship	Dallara F304	Sodemo-Renault	19	(Indonesia) Maher Algadrie
Team BRM	Championship	Dallara F304	Sodemo-Renault	22	(Australia) Chris Alajajian
Team BRM	Championship	Dallara F304	Sodemo-Renault	29	(Australia) Stuart Kostera
Team BRM	National	Dallara F301	Mugen-Honda	57	(Australia) Daniel Schulz
PRB Australia	National	Dallara F301	Spiess-Opel	6	(Australia) Chris Barry
HT Leads / Koni / FedEx	Championship	Dallara F304	Spiess-Opel	8	(New Zealand) Mathew Radisich
Astuti Motorsport	Championship	Dallara F304	Sodemo-Renault	10	(Austria) Walter Grubmuller (Australia) Ricky Occhipinti (Australia) Michael Trimble (Australia) Daniel Schulz
Astuti Motorsport	Championship	Dallara F304	Sodemo-Renault	11	(United Kingdom) Charles Hollings
JB Motorsport	National	Dallara F301	Novamotor-FIAT	12	(Australia) John Boothman
Gilmour Racing	Championship	Dallara F304	Spiess-Opel	17	(Australia) Chris Gilmour
Decentralised Demountables	Trophy	Dallara F398	Novamotor-FIAT	21	(Australia) Graeme Holmes
Scud Racing	National	Dallara F301	Spiess-Opel	25	(Australia) Ian Dyk (Australia) Lauren Gray (Australia) Stuart Kostera
Scud Racing	Championship	Dallara F304	Spiess-Opel	60	(Australia) Tim Macrow
Scud Racing	Trophy	Dallara F396	TOM'S-Toyota	87	(Australia) Greg Hunter
Scud Racing	Trophy	Dallara F396	TOM'S-Toyota	88	(Australia) Samantha Reid
Piccola Scuderia Corse	Championship	Dallara F304	Mugen-Honda	27	(United Kingdom) James Winslow
Formula Uno Racing	National	Dallara F301	Spiess-Opel	32	(Australia) Gordon Campbell
333 Racing	National	Dallara F301	Spiess-Opel	33	(Australia) Tim Berryman
Hack, Anderson & Thomas	Trophy	Dallara F398	TOM'S-Toyota	37	(Australia) Rod Anderson
Tandersport	Championship	Dallara F304	Spiess-Opel	42	(Australia) Leanne Tander

== Calendar ==
Round / Race	Circuit	Date	Pole position	Fastest lap	Winning driver	Winning team
1 / 1	(Australia) Eastern Creek Raceway	4 February	(Australia) Stuart Kostera	(Australia) Chris Alajajian	(Australia) Stuart Kostera	(Australia) Team BRM
1 / 2	(Australia) Eastern Creek Raceway	4 February	(United Kingdom) Charles Hollings	(Australia) Chris Alajajian	(Australia) Tim Macrow	(Australia) Scud Racing
2 / 1	(Australia) Oran Park Raceway	22 April	(United Kingdom) Charles Hollings	(United Kingdom) Charles Hollings	(United Kingdom) Charles Hollings	(Australia) Astuti Motorsport
2 / 2	(Australia) Oran Park Raceway	22 April	(United Kingdom) Charles Hollings	(Italy) Marco Mapelli	(United Kingdom) Charles Hollings	(Australia) Astuti Motorsport
3 / 1	(Australia) Phillip Island	6 May	(United Kingdom) James Winslow	(Australia) Mat Sofi	(United Kingdom) James Winslow	(Australia) Piccola Scuderia Course
3 / 2	(Australia) Phillip Island	6 May	(United Kingdom) James Winslow	(Australia) Leanne Tander	(Australia) Leanne Tander	(Australia) Tandersport
4 / 1	(Australia) Mallala Motor Sport Park	1 July	(Australia) Michael Trimble	(Italy) Marco Mapelli	(United Kingdom) James Winslow	(Australia) Piccola Scuderia Course
4 / 2	(Australia) Mallala Motor Sport Park	1 July	(Australia) Michael Trimble	(Australia) Michael Trimble	(Australia) Tim Macrow	(Australia) Scud Racing
5 / 1	(Australia) Eastern Creek Raceway	15 July	(Australia) Tim Macrow	(Italy) Marco Mapelli	(United Kingdom) Charles Hollings	(Australia) Astuti Motorsport
5 / 2	(Australia) Eastern Creek Raceway	15 July	(Australia) Leanne Tander	(Italy) Marco Mapelli	(Italy) Marco Mapelli	(Australia) Team BRM
6 / 1	(Australia) Phillip Island	12 August	(United Kingdom) James Winslow	(Australia) Mat Sofi	(Australia) Tim Macrow	(Australia) Scud Racing
6 / 2	(Australia) Phillip Island	12 August	Cancelled due to rain	(Australia) Leanne Tander	(Australia) Leanne Tander	(Australia) Tandersport
7 / 1	(Australia) Symmons Plains Raceway	2 September	(Australia) Leanne Tander	(United Kingdom) James Winslow	(United Kingdom) James Winslow	(Australia) Astuti Motorsport
7 / 2	(Tasmania) Tasmanian Super Prix	2 September	(United Kingdom) Charles Hollings	(Australia) Mat Sofi	(Australia) Barton Mawer	(Australia) Team BRM
8 / 1	(Australia) Oran Park Raceway	4 November	(Australia) Leanne Tander	(Australia) Leanne Tander	(United Kingdom) Charles Hollings	(Australia) Astuti Motorsport
8 / 2	(Australia) Oran Park Raceway	4 November	(Australia) Leanne Tander	(Australia) Tim Macrow	(Australia) Tim Macrow	(Australia) Scud Racing

== Results ==
Pos	Driver	EAS 1	EAS 2	ORA 1	ORA 2	PHI 1	PHI 2	MAL 1	MAL 2	EAS 3	EAS 4	PHI 3	PHI 4	SYM 1	SYM 2	ORA 3	ORA 4	Pts.
CHAMPIONSHIP CLASS
1	(Australia) Tim Macrow	3	1	2	2	4	5	Ret	1	3	5	1	2	7	3	2	1	208
2	(Australia) Leanne Tander	6	4	3	3	5	1	2	4	5	2	6	1	2	2	3	2	206
3	(United Kingdom) Charles Hollings	7	8	1	1	2	6	5	2	1	3	2	3	4	9	1	4	199
4	(United Kingdom) James Winslow	5	7	6	4	1	2	1	6	7	7	3	Ret	1	Ret			133
5	(Italy) Marco Mapelli	Ret	6	5	6	3	3	4	5	4	1	7	Ret	6	5			114
6	(Australia) Mat Sofi	4	Ret	8	9	6	4	7	8	6	6	12	Ret	Ret	Ret	4	6	71
7	(Australia) Stuart Kostera	1	5	4	7	7	11	3	7	8	DNS	Ret	DNS					68
8	(Australia) Barton Mawer											5	Ret	3	1	Ret	3	52
9	(Australia) Chris Gilmour			7	5							8	5	DNS	4	5	5	52
10	(Australia) Michael Trimble							6	3	2	4							46
11	(Australia) Daniel Schulz											4	4	5	6			34
12	(Australia) Chris Alajajian	2	2															32
13	(Austria) Walter Grubmuller	Ret	3													Ret	Ret	12
14	(Australia) Ricky Occhipinti					8	7											7
15	(Indonesia) Maher Algadrie	14	10															5
16	(New Zealand) Mathew Radisich					Ret	9					DNS	DNS					3
NATIONAL CLASS
1	(Australia) Chris Barry	8	9	9	8	10	10	8	9	9	9	10	Ret			6	7	269
2	(Australia) Lauren Gray	9	Ret	10	10	12	13	12	11	12	DNS					8	DNS	121
3	(Australia) John Boothman	11	12					14	DNS	13	11	11	7	10	Ret			101
4	(Australia) Daniel Schulz	Ret	Ret			11	8	9	10	Ret	8							92
5	(Australia) Jesse Wakeman							10	13			Ret	6	9	7			86
6	(Australia) Gordon Campbell	12	13															22
NC	(Australia) Stuart Kostera													Ret	Ret			0
NC	(Australia) Ian Dyk											Ret	DNS					0
NC	(Australia) Tim Berryman	DNS	DNS															0
TROPHY CLASS
1	(Australia) Rod Anderson	10	11			13	12	13	DNS	11	12			Ret	8	9	8	185
2	(Australia) Graeme Holmes					9	Ret	11	12	10	10	9	Ret					134
3	(Australia) Samantha Reid													Ret	DNS	7	9	38
4	(Australia) Greg Hunter	13	14															30

Colour	Result
Gold	Winner
Silver	Second place
Bronze	Third place
Green	Points classification
Blue	Non-points classification
Blue	Non-classified finish (NC)
Purple	Retired, not classified (Ret)
Red	Did not qualify (DNQ)
Red	Did not pre-qualify (DNPQ)
Black	Disqualified (DSQ)
White	Did not start (DNS)
White	Withdrew (WD)
White	Race cancelled (C)
Blank	Did not practice (DNP)
Blank	Did not arrive (DNA)
Blank	Excluded (EX)

=== Non-championship round ===
A non-championship round was held at Albert Park supporting the 2007 Australian Grand Prix, with three races held. The first was won by Charlie Hollings, and both the second and third races by Tim Macrow.
