= Tim Macrow =

Australian racing driver (born 1984)

- Nationality: Australian
- Born: 13 May 1984 (age 42)
- Relatives: Peter Macrow (father); Adam Macrow (brother)

Australian Drivers' Championship
- Years active: 2005–21
- Teams: Bob John Motors; Macrow Racing; Scud Racing; Astuti Motorsport; Team BRM
- Starts: 124
- Wins: 37
- Poles: 26
- Fastest laps: 17
- Best finish: 1st in 2007 and 2013 Australian Drivers' Championship

Previous series
- 2002 2002-04: Victorian Formula Ford Championship; Australian Formula Ford Championship

Championship titles
- 2007 2013: Australian Drivers' Championship; Australian Drivers' Championship

Timothy Macrow (born 13 May 1984 in Melbourne, Victoria) is an Australian racing driver. He has competed in Australian Formula 3 and Porsche Supercup, winning the Australian Drivers' Championship twice in the former category.

In 2019, Macrow raced in two exhibition rounds to launch the S5000 Series. In 2020, he is set to compete in the inaugural S5000 season.

Macrow is the son of Peter Macrow, brother of Adam Macrow.

== Racing record ==
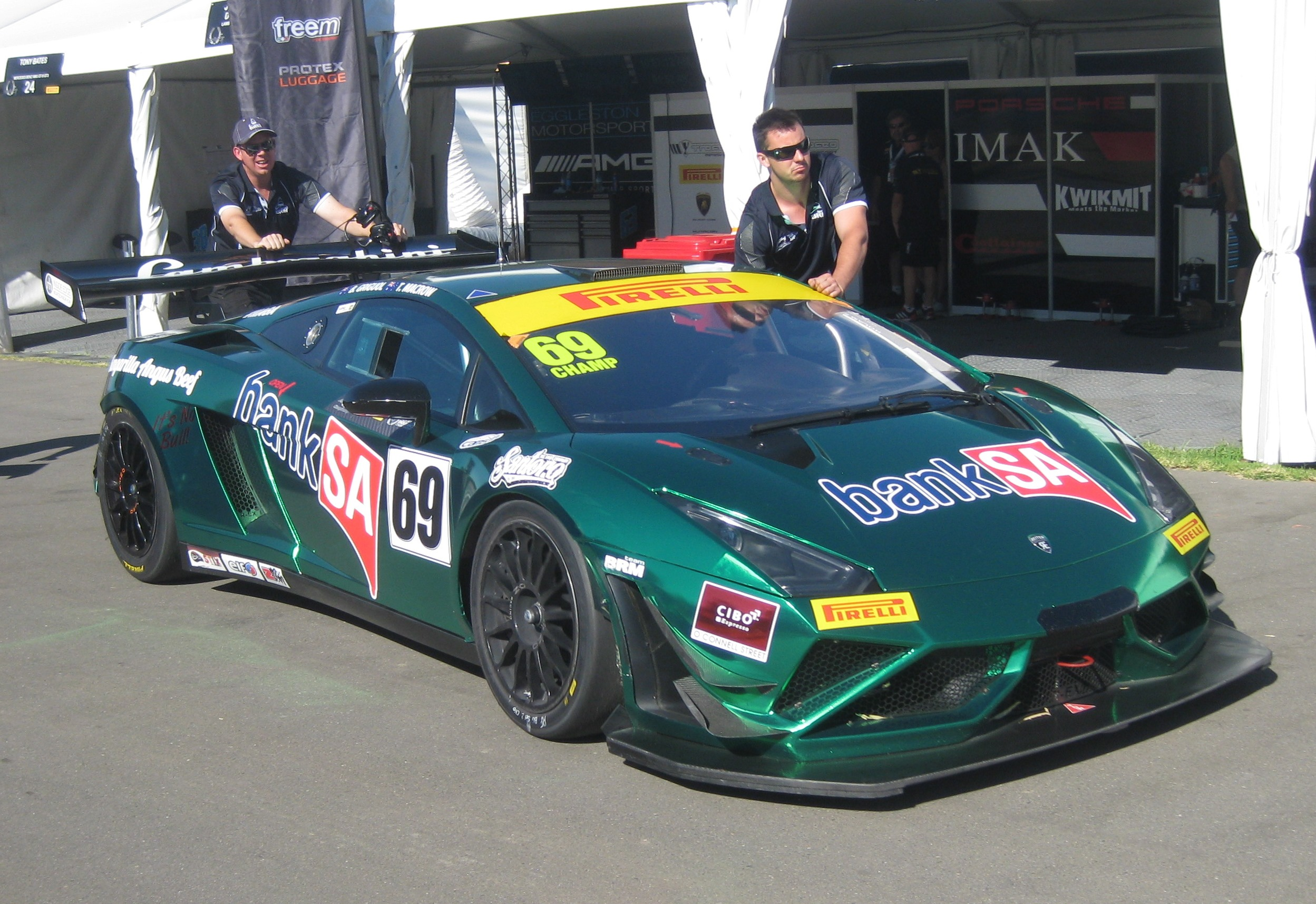
Macrow placed 35th in the 2017 Australian GT Championship driving a Lamborghini Gallardo R-EX

Season	Series	Position	Car	Team
2002	Australian Formula Ford Championship	18th	Spectrum 06b Ford	
2002	Victorian Formula Ford Championship	5th	Spectrum 06b Ford	
2003	Australian Formula Ford Championship	6th	Spectrum 09 Ford	Borland Racing Developments
2004	Australian Formula Ford Championship	**2nd**	Spectrum 010 Ford	Borland Racing Developments
2005	Australian Drivers' Championship	5th	Dallara F301 - Opel	Bob John Motors
2006	Australian Drivers' Championship	**2nd**	Dallara F301 Opel; Dallara F304 Opel	Macrow Racing
2007	Australian Drivers' Championship	**1st**	Dallara F304 Opel	Scud Racing
2008	Australian Drivers' Championship	**3rd**	Dallara F301 Opel	Scud Racing
2009	Australian Drivers' Championship	**2nd**	Dallara F307 Mercedes-Benz	Scud Racing
2010	Australian Drivers' Championship	10th	Dallara F307 Mercedes-Benz	Scud Racing
2011	Australian Drivers' Championship	10th	Dallara F304 Renault	Tim Macrow Racing
2012	Australian Drivers' Championship	9th	Dallara F307 Renault	Astuti Motorsport
2013	Australian Drivers' Championship	**1st**	Dallara F307 Opel; Dallara F307 Mercedes-Benz	Tim Macrow Racing; Team BRM
2017	Australian GT Championship	35th	Lamborghini Gallardo R-EX	Bank SA
2021	S5000 Australia	**2nd**	Rogers AF01/V8	Tim Macrow Racing
2021	S5000 Tasman Series	6th	Rogers AF01/V8	Tim Macrow Racing
2022	S5000 Australia	4th	Rogers AF01/V8	Tim Macrow Racing

=== Complete Porsche Supercup results ===
(key) (Races in bold indicate pole position) (Races in italics indicate fastest lap)

Year	Team	1	2	3	4	5	6	7	8	9	10	11	DC	Points
2007	Golden Spike Pertamina Indonesia RT	BHR1	BHR2	ESP1	MON	FRA	GBR; 25	GER	HUN	TUR	BEL	ITA	**NC**	**0**

=== Complete S5000 results ===
Year	Series	Team	1	2	3	4	5	6	7	8	9	10	11	12	13	14	15	Position	Points
2019	Exhibition	MTEC Motorsport	SAN; R1; 1	SAN; R2; 2	SAN; M Ret	BMP; R1; 8	BMP; R2; 1	BMP; M 6										N/C	-
2020	Australian	Tim Macrow Racing	APC; R1; PO	APC; R2; PO	SMP; R3; C	SMP; R4; C	WIN; R5; C	WIN; R6; C	BMP; R7; C	BMP; R8; C	PHI; R9; C	PHI; R10; C	SAN; R11; C	SAN; R12; C				N/C	-
2021	Australian	Tim Macrow Racing	SYM; R1; 5	SYM; R2; 1	SYM; R3; 2	PHI; R4; 1	PHI; R5; 5	PHI; R6; 3	SAN; R7; 4	SAN; R8; 7	SAN; R9; 5	SMP; R10; 6	SMP; R11; 2	SMP; R12; 5				2nd	350
2021	Tasman	Tim Macrow Racing	SMP; R1; 1	SMP; R2; 4	SMP; R3; 4	BAT; R4; Ret	BAT; R5; 1	BAT; R6; 7	BAT; R7; C									4th	119
2022	Australian	Tim Macrow Racing	SYM; R1; 5	SYM; R2; 2	SYM; R3; 1	PHI; R4; 4	PHI; R5; 1	PHI; R6; 4	MEL; R7; 5	MEL; R8; 5	MEL; R9; 3	SMP; R10; 3	SMP; R11; 3	SMP; R12; 5	HID; R13; 10	HID; R14; 3	HID; R15; Ret	4th	366
2022	Tasman	Tim Macrow Racing	SUR; R1	SUR; R2	SUR; R3	ADL; R4; 8	ADL; R5; Ret	ADL; R6; 7										13th	33

Sporting positions
Preceded by Ben Clucas	Winner of the Australian Drivers' Championship; 2007	Succeeded by James Winslow
Preceded by James Winslow	Winner of the Australian Drivers' Championship; 2013	Succeeded by Simon Hodge
