= Motorsport Australia =

Motorsports governing body

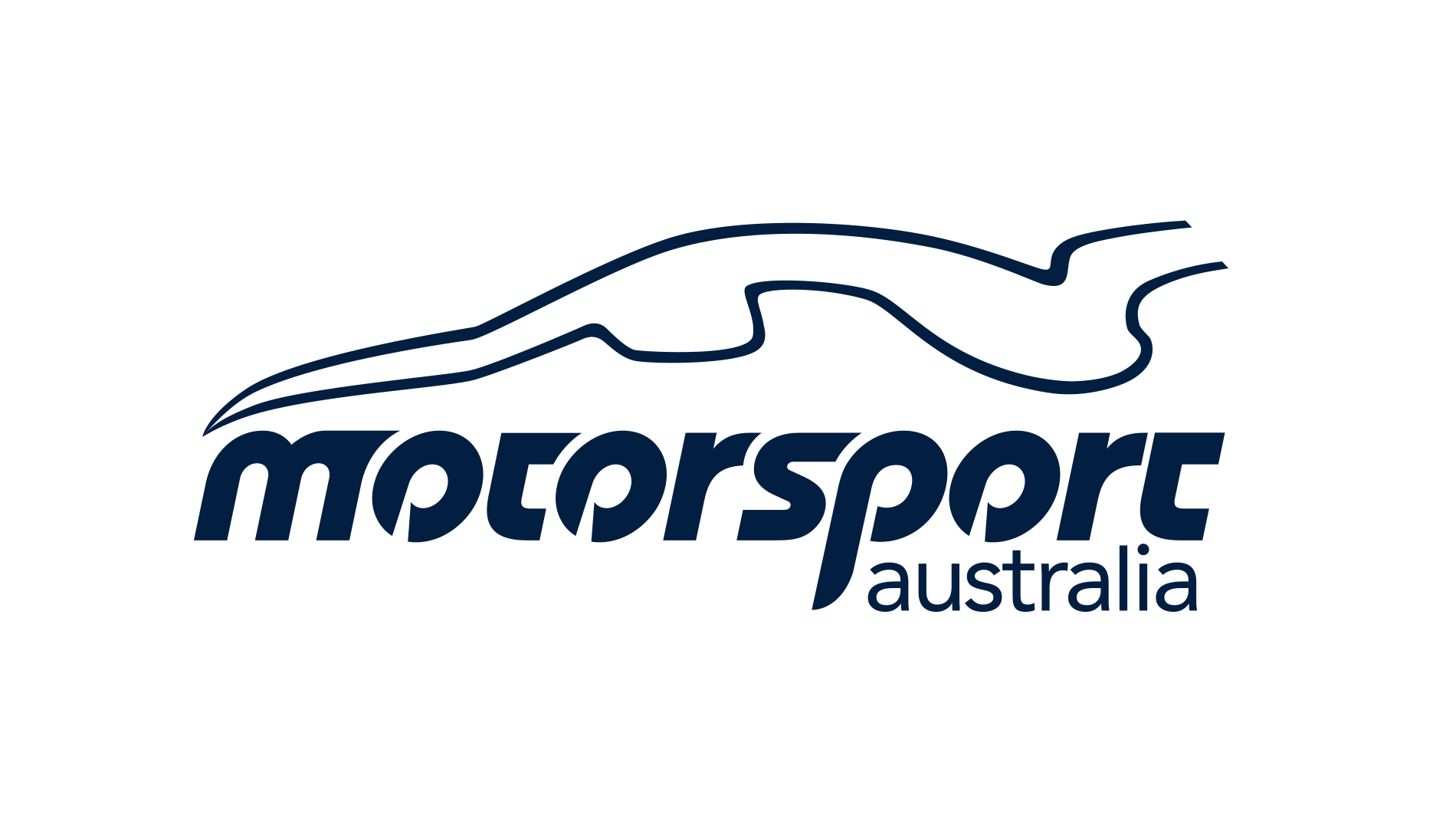
- Sport: Motorsport
- Jurisdiction: Australia
- Founded: February 1953; 73 years ago
- Affiliation: Fédération Internationale de l'Automobile
- Headquarters: Canterbury (Melbourne, Australia)
- President: Andrew Fraser
- CEO: Josh Blanksby

Official website
- motorsport.org.au
- (Australia)

Motorsport Australia, formerly the Confederation of Australian Motor Sport (CAMS), is the nationally recognised governing and sanctioning body for four-wheeled motorsport in Australia. It is affiliated with the Federation Internationale de l'Automobile (FIA).

== Responsibilities ==
Motorsport Australia has been the primary custodian of motor sport in Australia since 1953. It is the National Sporting Authority (ASN) for motorsport in Australia, recognised by Sport Australia, and is delegated this responsibility by the FIA. Motorsport Australia affiliated with the FIA in its own right in 1958 before being granted full membership in October of that year on a probationary basis.

In 1960, Motorsport Australia's membership of the FIA as an ASN was confirmed as permanent.

The FIA aims to ensure that motorsport is conducted in accordance with the highest standards of safety, fairness and social responsibility and Motorsport Australia, together with in excess of 120 other ASNs in over 100 nations, is committed to carrying out the mission of the FIA.

== History ==
Motorsport Australia has been the custodian of motorsport in Australia since it was founded in 1953. The organisation is the Australian-delegated national sporting authority by the FIA, the governing body for world motorsport and the federation of the world's leading motoring organisations; a responsibility Motorsport Australia has held since 1958.

Motorsport Australia is also recognised by Sport Australia as the only National Sporting Organisation for four-wheeled motorsport in Australia.

As at January 2020, Motorsport Australia had approximately 95,000 members, in over 600 car clubs. It licenses more than 27,500 competitors and over 10,500 accredited officials. Motorsport Australia sanctions more than 3000 events per year from club level to International level.

On 1 January 2020, Motorsport Australia was formally adapted as the trading name for what was previously CAMS.

== Other organising bodies ==
The non FIA-affiliated Australian Auto Sport Alliance (AASA) also sanctions motosport events in Australia. The relationship between the two organisations is not friendly; for example, a Motorsport Australia (then CAMS) official who competed in an AASA event was fined by CAMS in 2016.

== See also ==
- Motorsport in Australia
- List of Australian motor racing series
- CAMS Rising Stars
