= 1999 Australian Touring Car season =

Seasons
- ← 1998 2000 →

The 1999 Australian Touring Car season was the 40th year of touring car racing in Australia since the first runnings of the Australian Touring Car Championship and the fore-runner of the present day Bathurst 1000, the Armstrong 500.

Two major touring car categories raced in Australia during 1999, V8 Supercar and Super Touring. Between them there were 25 touring car race meetings held during 1999; a thirteen-round series for V8 Supercars, the 1999 Shell Championship Series (SCS), two of them endurance races; an eight-round series for Super Touring, the 1999 Australian Super Touring Championship (ASTC); support programme events at the 1999 Australian Grand Prix and 1999 Honda Indy 300 and two stand-alone long-distance races, nicknamed 'enduros'.

== Results and standings ==
=== Race Calendar ===
The 1999 Australian touring car season consisted of 25 events.

Date	Series	Circuit	City / State	Winner	Team	Car	Report
5–7 Mar	Hot Wheels V8 Supercar Showdown	Albert Park street circuit	Melbourne, Victoria	Craig Lowndes	Holden Racing Team	Holden VT Commodore	report
28 Mar	SCS Round 1	Eastern Creek Raceway	Sydney, New South Wales	Mark Skaife	Holden Racing Team	Holden VT Commodore	
10–11 Apr	Sensational Adelaide 500 SCS Round 2	Adelaide Street Circuit	Adelaide, South Australia	Craig Lowndes	Holden Racing Team	Holden VT Commodore	report
18 Apr	ASTC Round 1	Lakeside International Raceway	Brisbane, Queensland	Paul Morris	Paul Morris Motorsport	BMW 320i	
1–2 May	SCS Round 3	Barbagallo Raceway	Perth, Western Australia	Craig Lowndes	Holden Racing Team	Holden VT Commodore	
2 May	ASTC Round 2	Oran Park Raceway	Sydney, New South Wales	Jim Richards	Volvo Cars Australia	Volvo S40	
16 May	SCS Round 4	Phillip Island Grand Prix Circuit	Phillip Island, Victoria	Mark Skaife	Holden Racing Team	Holden VT Commodore	
30 May	ASTC Round 3	Mallala Motor Sport Park	Adelaide, South Australia	Paul Morris	Paul Morris Motorsport	BMW 320i	
6 Jun	SCS Round 5	Hidden Valley Raceway	Darwin, Northern Territory	Jason Bright	Stone Brothers Racing	Ford AU Falcon	
20 Jun	ASTC Round 4	Winton Motor Raceway	Benalla, Victoria	Paul Morris	Paul Morris Motorsport	BMW 320i	
27 Jun	SCS Round 6	Sandown Raceway	Melbourne, Victoria	Mark Skaife	Holden Racing Team	Holden VT Commodore	
11 Jul	SCS Round 7	Queensland Raceway	Ipswich, Queensland	Garth Tander	Garry Rogers Motorsport	Holden VS Commodore	
18 Jul	ASTC Round 5	Oran Park Raceway	Sydney, New South Wales	Paul Morris	Paul Morris Motorsport	BMW 320i	
25 Jul	SCS Round 8	Calder Park Raceway	Melbourne, Victoria	Mark Skaife	Holden Racing Team	Holden VT Commodore	
1 Aug	ASTC Round 6	Queensland Raceway	Ipswich, Queensland	Jim Richards	Volvo Cars Australia	Volvo S40	
8 Aug	SCS Round 9	Symmons Plains Raceway	Launceston, Tasmania	Mark Skaife	Holden Racing Team	Holden VT Commodore	
15 Aug	ASTC Round 7	Oran Park Raceway	Sydney, New South Wales	Jim Richards	Volvo Cars Australia	Volvo S40	
22 Aug	SCS Round 10	Winton Motor Raceway	Benalla, Victoria	Jason Bargwanna	Garry Rogers Motorsport	Holden VT Commodore	
29 Aug	ASTC Round 8	Calder Park Raceway	Melbourne, Victoria	Jim Richards	Volvo Cars Australia	Volvo S40	
5 Sep	SCS Round 11	Oran Park Raceway	Sydney, New South Wales	Mark Skaife	Holden Racing Team	Holden VT Commodore	
19 Sep	Queensland 500 SCS Round 12	Queensland Raceway	Ipswich, Queensland	Larry Perkins; Russell Ingall	Castrol Perkins Racing	Holden VT Commodore	report
3 Oct	Bob Jane T-Marts V8 300	Mount Panorama Circuit	Bathurst, New South Wales	James Brock	Biante Model Cars	Holden VS Commodore	report
3 Oct	Bob Jane T-Marts 500	Mount Panorama Circuit	Bathurst, New South Wales	Paul Morris	Paul Morris Motorsport	BMW 320i	report
17–18 Oct	V8 Supercar Challenge	Surfers Paradise street circuit	Surfers Paradise, Queensland	Paul Radisich	Dick Johnson Racing	Ford AU Falcon	report
14 Nov	FAI 1000 Classic SCS Round 13	Mount Panorama Circuit	Bathurst, New South Wales	Steven Richards; Greg Murphy	Gibson Motorsport	Holden VT Commodore	report

=== Hot Wheels V8 Supercar Showdown ===
This meeting was a support event of the 1999 Australian Grand Prix.

Driver	No.	Team	Car	Race 1	Race 2	Race 3	Race 4
(Australia) Craig Lowndes	1	Holden Racing Team	Holden VT Commodore	2	2	1	1
(Australia) Mark Skaife	2	Holden Racing Team	Holden VT Commodore	1	1	2	2
(Australia) Larry Perkins	11	Castrol Perkins Racing	Holden VT Commodore	DNF	12	8	3
(New Zealand) Steven Richards	12	Gibson Motorsport	Holden VT Commodore	9	7	6	4
(Australia) Russell Ingall	8	Castrol Perkins Racing	Holden VT Commodore	5	4	3	5
(Australia) Jason Bright	4	Stone Brothers Racing	Ford AU Falcon	7	DNF	13	6
(Australia) Steve Ellery	31	Steven Ellery Racing	Ford EL Falcon	3	3	5	7
(Australia) Tony Longhurst	25	Longhurst Racing	Ford EL Falcon	6	6	14	8
(Australia) Rodney Forbes	28	Rodney Forbes Racing	Holden VS Commodore	DNF	20	15	9
(Australia) Paul Romano	24	Romano Racing	Holden VS Commodore	31	14	12	10
(Australia) Terry Finnigan	27		Holden VS Commodore	17	DNF	18	11
(Australia) Mark Larkham	10	Larkham Motor Sport	Ford AU Falcon	10	15	19	12
(Australia) Jason Bargwanna	35	Garry Rogers Motorsport	Holden VT Commodore	DNF	27	DNS	13
(Australia) Dugal McDougall	16	Perkins Engineering	Holden VS Commodore	23	23	17	14
(Australia) Wayne Wakefield	47	Daily Planet Racing	Holden VS Commodore	22	DNF	21	15
(Australia) Trevor Ashby	3	Lansvale Racing Team	Holden VS Commodore	13	18	22	16
(Australia) Dean Lindstrom	50	Clive Wiseman Racing	Holden VS Commodore	18	19	24	17
(Australia) David Parsons	72	Robert Smith Racing	Holden VS Commodore	19	DNF	25	18
(Australia) Anthony Tratt	75	John Sidney Racing	Ford EL Falcon	21	DNF	DNF	19
(Australia) Rod Nash	55	Rod Nash Racing	Holden VS Commodore	29	24	26	20
(Australia) Kevin Heffernan	74	PACE Racing	Holden VS Commodore	DNF	21	DNF	21
(Australia) Nathan Pretty	50	Pretty Motorsport	Holden VS Commodore	24	DNF	27	22
(Australia) Mike Imrie	14	Imrie Motor Sport	Holden VT Commodore	28	26	29	23
(Australia) D'arcy Russell	48	Rod Smith Racing	Holden VS Commodore	27	28	DNS	24
(Australia) Richard Mork	77	V8 Racing	Holden VS Commodore	30	DNF	30	25
(New Zealand) Steven Richards	7	Gibson Motorsport	Holden VT Commodore	12	9	DNS	26
(Australia) Paul Weel	43	Paul Weel Racing	Ford EL Falcon	15	17	20	DNF
(Australia) Simon Emerzidis	54	Simon Emerzidis	Ford EL Falcon	25	22	23	DNF
(Australia) Mark Noske	99	Holden Young Lions	Holden VS Commodore	DNF	13	16	DNF
(Australia) Neil Crompton	6	Ford Tickford Racing	Ford EL Falcon	20	10	7	DNF
(Australia) Wayne Gardner	19	Perkins Engineering	Holden VT Commodore	DNF	11	9	DNF
(Australia) Cameron McLean	40	Greenfield Mowers Racing	Ford EL Falcon	11	29	32	DNF
(Australia) Mike Conway	79	Cadillac Productions	Ford EL Falcon	26	25	28	DNF
(Australia) Garth Tander	34	Garry Rogers Motorsport	Holden VT Commodore	DSQ	16	10	DNF
(Australia) Glenn Seton	5	Ford Tickford Racing	Ford AU Falcon	DNF	DNF	11	DNF
(New Zealand) John Faulkner	46	John Faulkner Racing	Holden VT Commodore	14	8	31	DNF
(Australia) John Bowe	66	PAE Motorsport	Ford EL Falcon	4	5	4	DNF
(Australia) Dick Johnson	17	Dick Johnson Racing	Ford AU Falcon	16	DNF	DNS	DNS
(New Zealand) Paul Radisich	18	Dick Johnson Racing	Ford AU Falcon	DNF	DNF	DNS	DNS
(Australia) Todd Kelly	15	Holden Young Lions	Holden VS Commodore	8	DNF	DNS	DNS

=== V8 Supercar Challenge ===
This meeting was a support event of the 1999 Honda Indy 300.

Driver	No.	Team	Car	Race 1	Race 2	Race 3
(New Zealand) Paul Radisich	18	Dick Johnson Racing	Ford EL Falcon	1	1	1
(Australia) Russell Ingall	8	Castrol Perkins Racing	Holden VS Commodore	4	5	2
(New Zealand) John Faulkner	46	John Faulkner Racing	Holden VT Commodore	6	6	3
(Australia) Wayne Gardner	19	Perkins Engineering	Holden VT Commodore	7	7	4
(Australia) Mark Larkham	10	Larkham Motor Sport	Ford AU Falcon	8	8	5
(Australia) Jason Bright	4	Stone Brothers Racing	Ford AU Falcon	15	12	6
(Australia) Larry Perkins	11	Castrol Perkins Racing	Holden VS Commodore	11	11	7
(Australia) Jason Bargwanna	35	Garry Rogers Motorsport	Holden VT Commodore	13	13	8
(Australia) Glenn Seton	5	Glenn Seton Racing	Ford AU Falcon	14	16	9
(New Zealand) Steven Richards	96	John Faulkner Racing	Holden VS Commodore	20	17	10
(Australia) Steve Reed	3	Lansvale Racing Team	Holden VS Commodore	12	15	11
(Australia) Mark Skaife	2	Holden Racing Team	Holden VS Commodore	DNF	10	12
(Australia) Tony Longhurst	25	Longhurst Racing	Ford AU Falcon	10	9	13
(Australia) Paul Romano	24	Romano Racing	Holden VS Commodore	DNF	DNF	14
(Australia) David Parsons	73	Challenge Recruitment	Holden VS Commodore	17	19	15
(Australia) Rodney Forbes	28	Rodney Forbes Racing	Holden VS Commodore	18	DNF	16
(Australia) Neil Crompton	6	Glenn Seton Racing	Ford EL Falcon	9	14	17
(Australia) Dick Johnson	17	Dick Johnson Racing	Ford EL Falcon	16	18	DNF
(Australia) Garth Tander	34	Garry Rogers Motorsport	Holden VT Commodore	3	3	DNF
(Australia) Steve Ellery	31	Steven Ellery Racing	Ford EL Falcon	2	2	DNS
(Australia) Craig Lowndes	1	Holden Racing Team	Holden VS Commodore	5	4	DNS
(Australia) Brett Peters	22	Colourscan Motorsport	Ford EL Falcon	19	20	DNS
