= 2025 Gold Coast 500 =

Motor racing event in Queensland, Australia

(Queensland) 2025 Gold Coast 500
Event Information
- Round 12 of 14 in the 2025 Supercars Championship
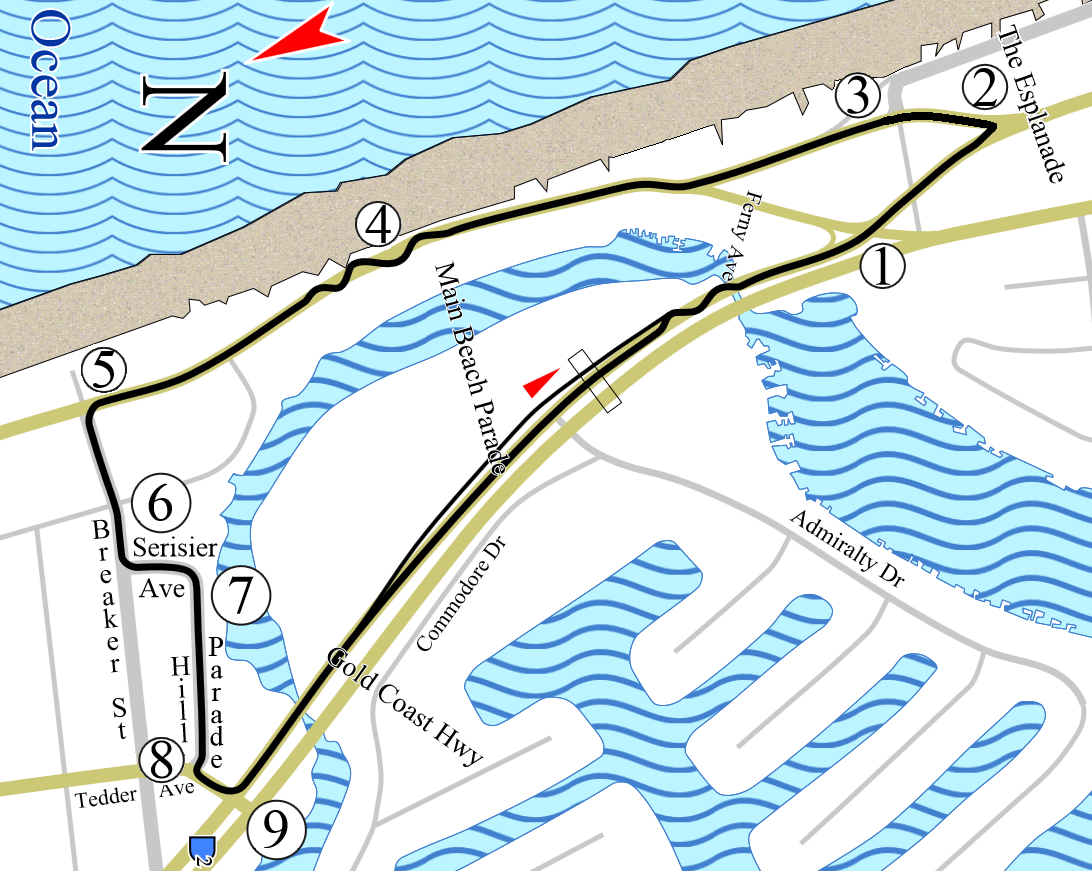
- Layout of the Surfers Paradise Circuit
- Date: 24–26 October 2025
- Location: Gold Coast, Queensland
- Venue: Surfers Paradise Street Circuit

Results
Race 1
Distance	85 laps	250 km
Pole position	(New Zealand) Ryan Wood; Walkinshaw Andretti United	
Winner	(Australia) Chaz Mostert; Walkinshaw Andretti United	
Race 2
Distance	85 laps	250 km
Pole position	(Australia) Broc Feeney; Triple Eight Race Engineering	
Winner	(Australia) Chaz Mostert; Walkinshaw Andretti United	
Round Results
First	(Australia) Chaz Mostert; Walkinshaw Andretti United	300 pts
Second	(Australia) Broc Feeney; Triple Eight Race Engineering	276 pts
Third	(Australia) Kai Allen; Grove Racing	226 pts

The 2025 Gold Coast 500 (known for commercial reasons as the 2025 Boost Mobile Gold Coast 500) was a motor racing event for Supercars that was held on 24–26 October 2025 at the Surfers Paradise Street Circuit in the Gold Coast, Queensland, Australia. The round consisted of two 250 km races and was the twelfth round of the 2025 Supercars Championship. It also marked the beginning of the inaugural Supercars Finals Series.

Chaz Mostert won both races with Broc Feeney following behind in second. The first race saw the pair accompanied by Kai Allen whilst the second had Andre Heimgartner with his first podium of the season.

== Background ==
The event was held on the weekend of 24–26 October 2025. It was the 31st Supercars event held at the Surfers Paradise Street Circuit in the Gold Coast and consisted of two 250 km races. It was held at the 14th running of the Gold Coast 500 and the 4th running as a single-driver event. Prior events had been held as the V8 Supercar Challenge under non-championship and championship status to support the Gold Coast Indy 300.

This event also marked the first round of the newly implemented Finals Series championship format. This saw the championship's top 10 drivers have their points reset, with the top 7 at the end of the round remaining in contention for the driver's championship. Going into the weekend, Broc Feeney of Triple Eight Race Engineering had a lead of 30 points over Grove Racing's Matthew Payne.

=== Entry list ===
Twenty four cars were entered into the event — 14 sixth-generation Chevrolet Camaros and 11 seventh-generation Ford Mustangs. Only one driver change was made from the beginning of the season, with Aaron Cameron replacing Aaron Love at Blanchard Racing Team at the Melbourne SuperSprint.

Additionally, Cam Waters of Tickford Racing ran #40 on his car instead of #6 in celebration of Tickford's sponsor Autobarn and their 40th anniversary.

== Results ==
=== Race 1 ===
Pos.	No.	Driver	Team	Car	Laps	Time/Retired	Grid	Pts
1	25	(Australia) Chaz Mostert	Walkinshaw Andretti United	Ford Mustang S650	85	1:53:27.795	4	150
2	88	(Australia) Broc Feeney	Triple Eight Race Engineering	Chevrolet Camaro ZL1	85	+7.609	2	138
3	26	(Australia) Kai Allen	Grove Racing	Ford Mustang S650	85	+9.948	12	127
4	40	(Australia) Cam Waters	Tickford Racing	Ford Mustang S650	85	+11.195	6	117
5	1	(Australia) Will Brown	Triple Eight Race Engineering	Chevrolet Camaro ZL1	85	+29.083	10	107
6	7	(Australia) James Courtney	Blanchard Racing Team	Ford Mustang S650	85	+34.302	7	99
7	8	(New Zealand) Andre Heimgartner	Brad Jones Racing	Chevrolet Camaro ZL1	85	+34.962	13	91
8	18	(Australia) Anton De Pasquale	Team 18	Chevrolet Camaro ZL1	85	+37.894^{1}	9	84
9	55	(Australia) Thomas Randle	Tickford Racing	Ford Mustang S650	85	+43.315	14	77
10	19	(New Zealand) Matthew Payne	Grove Racing	Ford Mustang S650	85	+44.121	3	71
11	14	(Australia) Bryce Fullwood	Brad Jones Racing	Chevrolet Camaro ZL1	85	+45.373	21	65
12	31	(Australia) James Golding	PremiAir Racing	Chevrolet Camaro ZL1	85	+45.702	5	60
13	17	(Australia) Will Davison	Dick Johnson Racing	Ford Mustang S650	85	+47.459	17	55
14	20	(Australia) David Reynolds	Team 18	Chevrolet Camaro ZL1	85	+51.868	8	51
15	9	(Australia) Jack Le Brocq	Erebus Motorsport	Chevrolet Camaro ZL1	85	+56.011	19	47
16	96	(Australia) Macauley Jones	Brad Jones Racing	Chevrolet Camaro ZL1	85	+59.232	23	43
17	3	(Australia) Aaron Cameron	Blanchard Racing Team	Ford Mustang S650	84	+1 lap	16	40
18	10	(Australia) Nick Percat	Matt Stone Racing	Chevrolet Camaro ZL1	84	+1 lap	11	36
19	18	(Australia) Richie Stanaway	PremiAir Racing	Chevrolet Camaro ZL1	80	+5 laps	18	33
20	2	(New Zealand) Ryan Wood	Walkinshaw Andretti United	Ford Mustang S650	77	+8 laps	1	31
Ret	4	(Australia) Cameron Hill	Matt Stone Racing	Chevrolet Camaro ZL1	76	Mechanical	22	
Ret	12	(New Zealand) Jaxon Evans	Brad Jones Racing	Chevrolet Camaro ZL1	25	Accident	20	
Ret	99	(Australia) Cooper Murray	Erebus Motorsport	Chevrolet Camaro ZL1	17	Tyre issue	15	
DNS	38	(Australia) Brodie Kostecki	Dick Johnson Racing	Ford Mustang S650	0	Accident	—^{2}	

Notes

- ^1 – Anton De Pasquale crossed the finishing line in sixth before being given a 5-second penalty for track limits, dropping him to eighth.
- ^2 – Brodie Kostecki qualified in 16th place but did not start the race after crashing during qualifying. All drivers who qualified behind him were promoted on the starting grid.

=== Race 2 ===
Pos.	No.	Driver	Team	Car	Laps	Time/Retired	Grid	Pts
1	25	(Australia) Chaz Mostert	Walkinshaw Andretti United	Ford Mustang S650	85	1:43:39.119	3	150
2	88	(Australia) Broc Feeney	Triple Eight Race Engineering	Chevrolet Camaro ZL1	85	+0.575	1	138
3	8	(New Zealand) Andre Heimgartner	Brad Jones Racing	Chevrolet Camaro ZL1	85	+2.619	6	127
4	19	(New Zealand) Matthew Payne	Grove Racing	Ford Mustang S650	85	+2.954	9	117
5	40	(Australia) Cam Waters	Tickford Racing	Ford Mustang S650	85	+3.297	4	107
6	26	(Australia) Kai Allen	Grove Racing	Ford Mustang S650	85	+4.605	8	99
7	55	(Australia) Thomas Randle	Tickford Racing	Ford Mustang S650	85	+5.762	2	91
8	1	(Australia) Will Brown	Triple Eight Race Engineering	Chevrolet Camaro ZL1	85	+6.372	18	84
9	2	(New Zealand) Ryan Wood	Walkinshaw Andretti United	Ford Mustang S650	85	+7.518	13	77
10	3	(Australia) Aaron Cameron	Blanchard Racing Team	Ford Mustang S650	84	+8.285	7	71
11	38	(Australia) Brodie Kostecki	Dick Johnson Racing	Ford Mustang S650	85	+8.983	14	65
12	20	(Australia) David Reynolds	Team 18	Chevrolet Camaro ZL1	85	+9.425	24	60
13	99	(Australia) Cooper Murray	Erebus Motorsport	Chevrolet Camaro ZL1	85	+9.847	21	55
14	12	(New Zealand) Jaxon Evans	Brad Jones Racing	Chevrolet Camaro ZL1	85	+10.617	16	51
15	9	(Australia) Jack Le Brocq	Erebus Motorsport	Chevrolet Camaro ZL1	85	+11.395	20	47
16	18	(Australia) Anton De Pasquale	Team 18	Chevrolet Camaro ZL1	85	+21.943^{1}	17	43
17	4	(Australia) Cameron Hill	Matt Stone Racing	Chevrolet Camaro ZL1	84	+1 lap	19	40
18	31	(Australia) James Golding	PremiAir Racing	Chevrolet Camaro ZL1	84	+1 lap^{2}	5	36
19	96	(Australia) Macauley Jones	Brad Jones Racing	Chevrolet Camaro ZL1	83	+2 laps	23	33
20	17	(Australia) Will Davison	Dick Johnson Racing	Ford Mustang S650	83	+2 laps	15	31
21	14	(Australia) Bryce Fullwood	Brad Jones Racing	Chevrolet Camaro ZL1	81	+4 laps	12	28
22	10	(Australia) Nick Percat	Matt Stone Racing	Chevrolet Camaro ZL1	75	+10 laps	11	26
Ret	62	(Australia) Richie Stanaway	PremiAir Racing	Chevrolet Camaro ZL1	81	Suspension	10	
Ret	7	(Australia) James Courtney	Blanchard Racing Team	Ford Mustang S650	76	Accident	5	

Notes

- ^1 – Anton De Pasquale crossed the finishing line in ninth before being given a 15-second penalty for contact with James Courtney, dropping him to sixteenth.
- ^2 – James Golding crossed the finishing line in seventeenth before being given a post-race drive-through penalty for breaching safety car procedure. This was equated to a 27-second penalty and moved him down to eighteenth.

== Championship standings after the round ==
Drivers' Championship standings

	Pos.	Driver	Points
Unchanged	1	(Australia) Broc Feeney	3451
	2	(Australia) Chaz Mostert	3357
	3	(New Zealand) Matthew Payne	3333
Unchanged	4	(Australia) Cam Waters	3302
	5	(Australia) Will Brown	3287
	6	(Australia) Kai Allen	3247
	7	(Australia) Thomas Randle	3207
	8	(Australia) Anton De Pasquale	3175
Unchanged	9	(New Zealand) Ryan Wood	3138
	10	(Australia) Brodie Kostecki	3131

Teams' Championship standings

	Pos.	Constructor	Points
Unchanged	1	Triple Eight Race Engineering	4841
Unchanged	2	Grove Racing	3958
Unchanged	3	Tickford Racing	3652
Unchanged	4	Walkinshaw Andretti United	3327
Unchanged	5	Team 18	2715

- Note: Only the top ten positions are shown for drivers' standings and top five for teams'.
