= Surfers Paradise Street Circuit =

Motorsport track in Australia

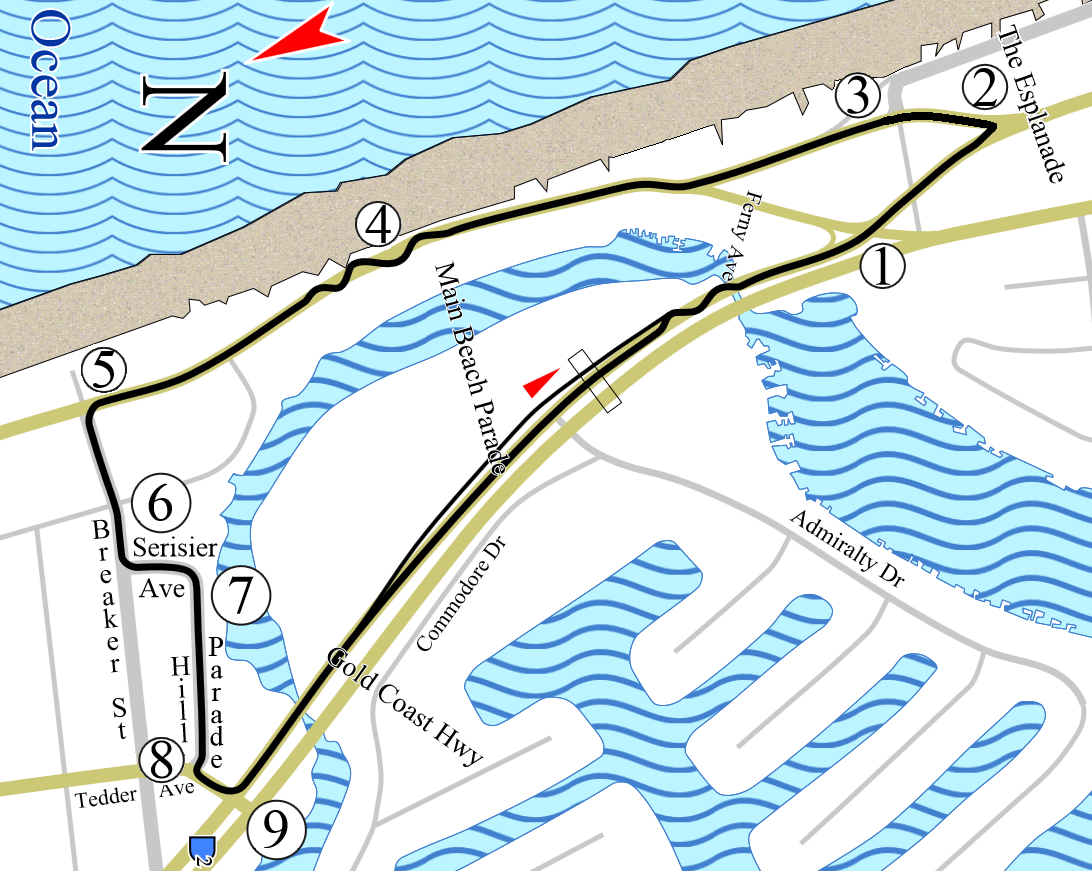
- Supercars Street Circuit (2010–present) Original Street Circuit (1991–2009)
- Location: Surfers Paradise, Queensland
- Coordinates: 27°59′23″S 153°25′40″E
- FIA Grade: 2
- Broke ground: 1988
- Opened: 15 March 1991; 35 years ago
- Major events: Current: Supercars Championship; Gold Coast 500 (2010–2019, 2022–present); V8 Supercar Challenge (1994, 1996–2009); Former: S5000 Tasman Series (2022); Australian GT (2012, 2019); Australian F4 (2015–2017); Champ Car Gold Coast Indy 300 (1991–2008)

Supercars Street Circuit (2010–present)
- Length: 2.960 km (1.839 mi)
- Turns: 15
- Race lap record: 1:08.8255 ( (Australia) Chaz Mostert, Ford Mustang S650, 2025, Supercars)

Original Street Circuit (1991–2009)
- Length: 4.470 km (2.778 mi)
- Turns: 20
- Race lap record: 1:31.093 ( (United States) Graham Rahal, Panoz DP01, 2007, Champ Car)

The Surfers Paradise Street Circuit is a temporary street circuit in Surfers Paradise, in Queensland, Australia. The 2.960 km (1.839 mi) beach-side track has several fast sections and two chicanes, having been shortened from an original 4.470 km (2.778 mi) length in 2010. It is the third of three motor racing circuits that have existed in the Gold Coast region, after the Southport Road Circuit (1954–1955) and Surfers Paradise International Raceway (1966–1987).

From 1991 to 2008, the circuit hosted an American Championship car racing event, the Gold Coast Indy 300. The circuit has also hosted touring car races since 1994, with the Supercars Championship currently contesting the annual Gold Coast 500 at the circuit.

== Circuit ==
=== Background ===
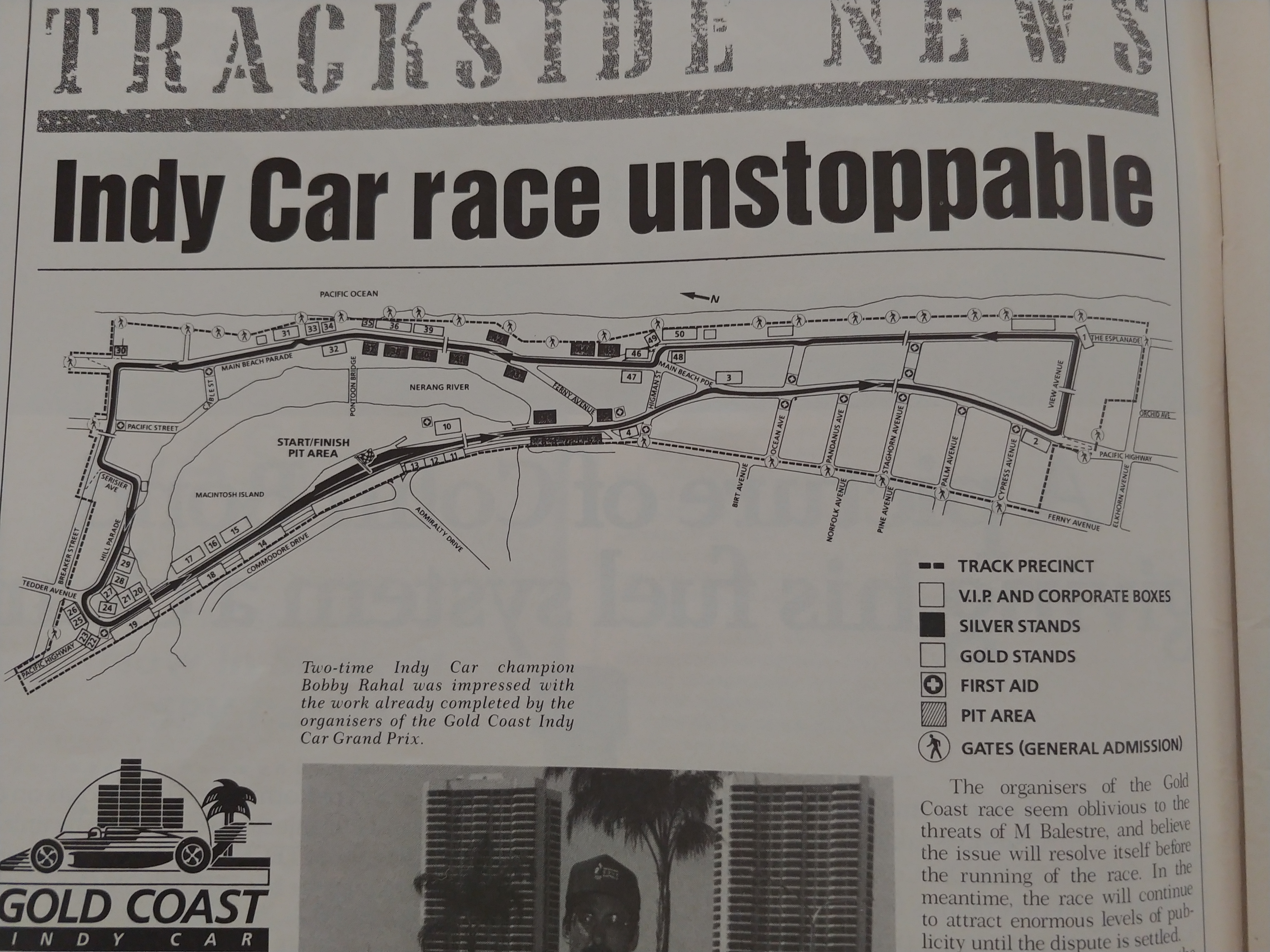
Original Proposed Layout shown in 1991

Ron Dickson, the president of D3 Motorsport Development held the rights for CART internationally in the 1980s. Following lobbying from prominent Queensland businessmen, and a brief meeting with State Premier Joh Bjelke-Petersen, the event was confirmed for Queensland, and Surfers Paradise was chosen over Brisbane, the state capital. The original circuit layout was designed by Ron Dickson of D3 Motorsport Development, and was the fourth concept put forward for the Surfers Paradise area. The originally accepted design, see image to the left, had what is now known as the second chicane being the first chicane. The design was modified late in 1990, to include what is now known as the first chicane, due to concerns that the speeds reached towards the southern and northern parts of the circuit were too high for the amount of run off provided. Preliminary work was carried out in 1988, and the circuit was opened on 15 March 1991 for the 1991 Gold Coast IndyCar Grand Prix.

=== Construction ===
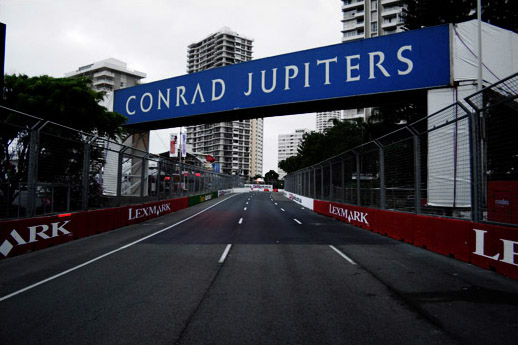
The track during construction for the 2006 Lexmark Indy 300

The construction of the circuit has been acclaimed internationally and is used as a benchmark for new temporary street circuits world-wide. Over a full 12-month period plans are laid and then implemented to transform a bustling residential, commercial and holiday destination into a temporary street circuit capable of facilitating high-speed motor races and hundreds of thousands of people. The circuit construction since 2009 has been project managed by local Gold Coast firm iEDM who specialise in motorsport venue engineering and delivery.

In constructing the original circuit, over a two-month construction period, seven bridges were erected, along with 2,515 concrete barriers, 11,500 grandstand seats, more than 140 corporate suites, 10 km (6.2 mi) of debris fencing and 16 km (9.9 mi) of security fencing, as well as many more temporary structures being fitted, and large-scale power and telecommunications systems being activated.

The circuit is also an international leader in motor racing safety standards applauded by the Confederation of Australian Motorsport and the FIA (the international governing body of motorsport). One of the major advancements over the later years of the Champ Car era was the installation of double height debris fencing, including an additional 610 panels in high impact areas in 2005.

=== Shortened layout ===
Since 2010, the Supercars Championship has run a notably shorter layout of the circuit. At the Turn 2 chicane, the circuit enters a hairpin to the left and rejoins the original track at the Esses. The then-CEO of V8 Supercars, Tony Cochrane, suggested this layout after the A1 Grand Prix cars dropped out of the 2009 event. This was an effort to reduce the cost of running the event without an international drawcard series. This was achieved by reducing the construction time, amount of materials needed and also limits the impact on local residents and tourists. It is no longer possible to use the full circuit with the G:link light rail line having been built over it.

== History ==
=== American Championship car racing ===
Original Surfers Paradise Street Circuit

An annual event had been held here beginning with the opening round of the 1991 IndyCar season. Following the merger of the Indy Racing League and Champ Car World Series in February 2008, the future of race had originally been secured until 2013 as an IRL IndyCar Series event, however the race was dropped from the calendar after the first demonstration race, and the A1 Grand Prix was signed up as a replacement, severing its eighteen-year history with American open wheel racing.

=== A1 Grand Prix ===
On 11 November 2008 after extensive negotiations with the IRL broke down, the Queensland Government reached a new five-year deal with A1 Grand Prix to stage a race at Surfers Paradise. The first A1GP race was supposed to take place on 25 October 2009. To accommodate the new link with the A1GP series and subsequent removal of the Indy name (which is a registered trademark of the Indianapolis Motor Speedway), the entire four-day event was called the Nikon SuperGP. However, on 17 October 2009, A1GP Chairman Tony Teixeira announced that the UK operating arm of the series went into liquidation in June. Access to the A1GP cars and the ability to pay its suppliers had been impeded. That caused the cars to be impounded the UK. A1 Grand Prix subsequently failed to arrive and were removed from the program, replaced with additional V8 Supercar races.

=== Touring cars ===
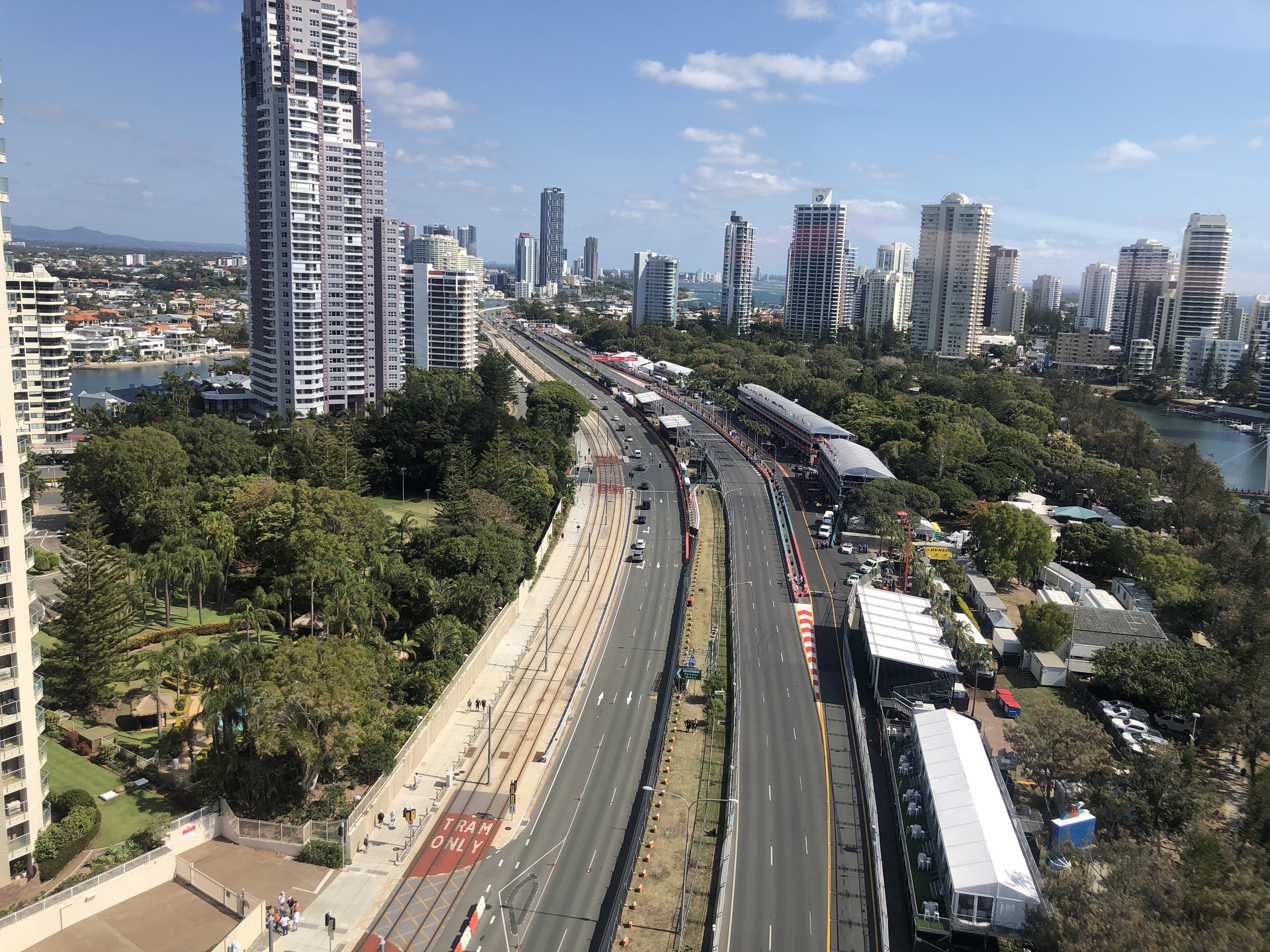
An aerial view of the street circuit as seen from a helicopter.

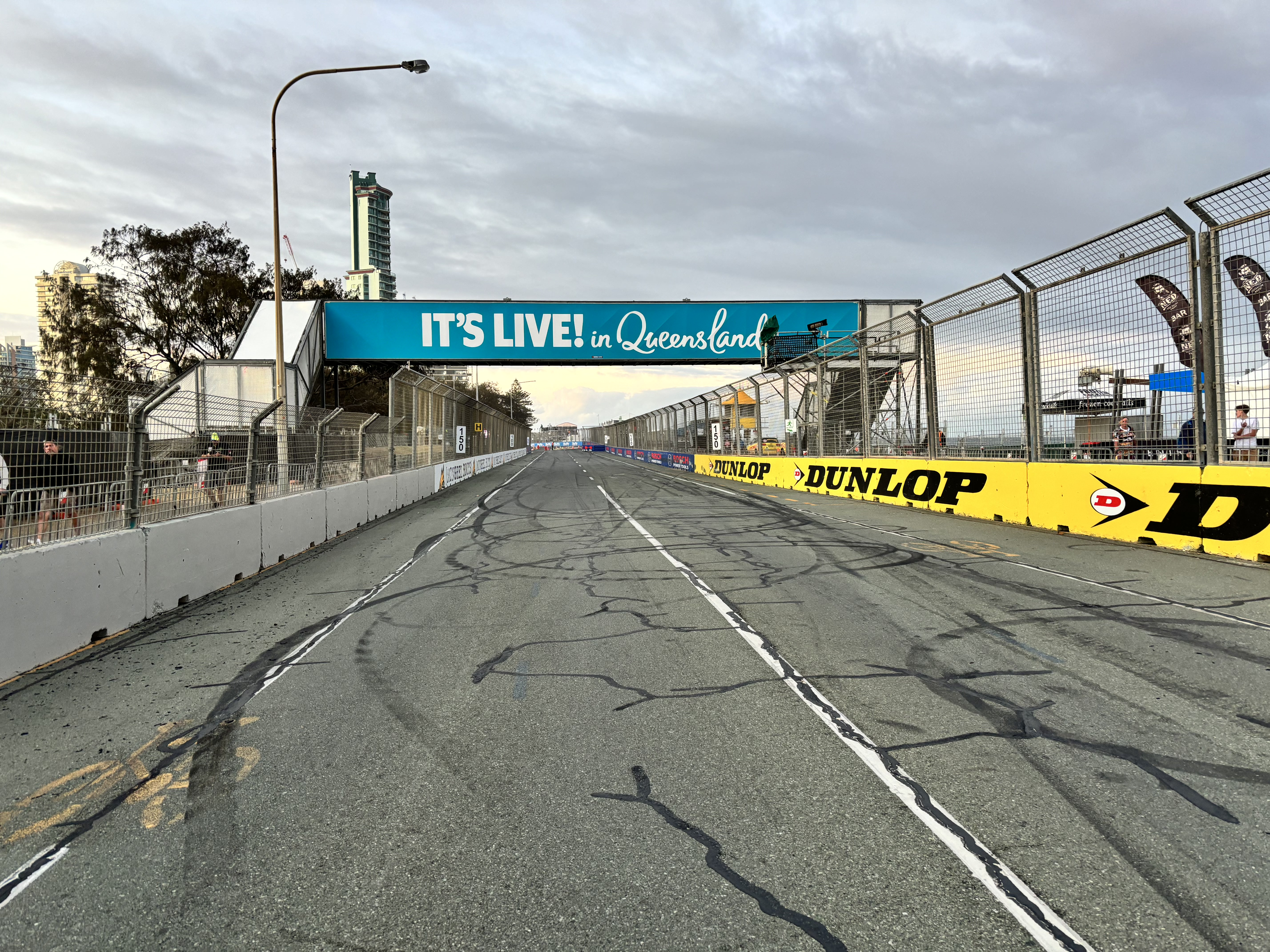
A north-bound view of the circuit on the Main Beach straight. Photo taken post-race.

Since 2002, the Surfers Paradise race has counted for points in the V8 Supercars championship, now known as Supercars. V8 Supercars and the preceding Group 3A touring car category had previously appeared as a support category in 1994 and from 1996 onwards.

From 2003 to 2007, the touring cars officially shared top billing with the Champcar World Series, and then with the Indy Racing League in 2008. The 2009 race was amended after the demise of A1GP, moving to a 600 km (370 mi) format of four 150 km (93 mi) races, two on Saturday and two on Sunday. From that year on, Supercars are the major category at the event. For 2010 the format was changed to consist of a single 300 km (190 mi) race on each day, with two drivers per car.

In 2011 Sébastien Bourdais became the first and only driver to win at Surfers Paradise in both a Champ Car (in 2005 and 2007) and a V8 Supercar (in 2011, and then again in 2012).

== Events ==
Current

- October: Supercars Championship Gold Coast 500, Porsche Carrera Cup Australia Championship, SuperUtes Series, Aussie Racing Cars

Former

- Australian Formula 3 Championship (2002, 2004)
- Australian Formula Ford Championship (2009–2011, 2013)
- Australian GT Championship (2012, 2019)
- Australian Mini Challenge (2009–2010)
- Australian Nations Cup Championship (2000–2003)
- Australian Performance Car Championship (2000–2003)
- Champ Car World Series
  - Gold Coast Indy 300 (1991–2008)
- Formula 4 Australian Championship (2015–2017)
- National Sports Sedan Series (2023)
- S5000 Tasman Series (2022)
- Stadium Super Trucks (2015–2016, 2019)
- Supercars Championship
  - V8 Supercar Challenge (1994, 1996–2009)
- Touring Car Masters (2011)
- Toyota Gazoo Racing Australia 86 Series (2024–2025)
- V8 Ute Racing Series (2001–2003, 2005–2007, 2010–2017)

== Lap records ==
As of October 2025, the official race lap records at Surfers Paradise Street Circuit are listed as:

Category	Time	Driver	Vehicle	Date
Supercars Street Circuit (2010–present): 2.960 km (1.839 mi)
Supercars	1:08.8255	(Australia) Chaz Mostert	Ford Mustang S650	25 October 2025
S5000	1:09.4981	(Australia) Joey Mawson	Rogers AF01/V8-Ford	30 October 2022
Sports Sedan	1:11.0365	(Australia) Cameron McLeod	MARC GT SS Mustang	29 October 2023
Porsche Carrera Cup	1:11.3291	(Australia) Bayley Hall	Porsche 911 (992 I) GT3 Cup	26 October 2025
GT3	1:11.9918	(Australia) Fraser Ross	McLaren 720S GT3	26 October 2019
Formula Ford	1:15.8478	(Australia) Nick Foster	Mygale SJ10A	27 October 2013
Formula 4	1:16.8732	(Australia) Will Brown	Mygale M14-F4	23 October 2016
Aussie Racing Cars	1:20.4824	(Australia) Kody Garland	ARC Mustang Yamaha	24 October 2025
Touring Car Masters	1:21.3734	(New Zealand) Jim Richards	Ford Falcon Sprint	21 October 2011
SuperUtes Series	1:23.5179	(Australia) Cameron Crick	Ford Ranger	26 October 2024
V8 Ute Racing Series	1:24.0277	(Australia) George Miedecke	Ford FG Falcon Ute	23 October 2015
Toyota GR86 Racing Series	1:25.2372	(Australia) Lincoln Taylor	Toyota GR86	25 October 2025
Stadium Super Trucks	1:33.8386	(United States) Sheldon Creed	Stadium Super Truck-Chevrolet	23 October 2016
Original Street Circuit (1991–2009): 4.470 km (2.778 mi)
Champ Car	1:31.093	(United States) Graham Rahal	Panoz DP01	21 October 2007
IndyCar	1:35.1552	(United Kingdom) Dario Franchitti	Dallara IR-05	26 October 2008
Formula Three	1:47.9630	(Australia) John Martin	Dallara F307	24 October 2008
V8 Supercars	1:49.8352	(Australia) Garth Tander	Holden VE Commodore	21 October 2007
Porsche Carrera Cup	1:53.2297	(New Zealand) Craig Baird	Porsche 911 (997) GT3 Cup	23 October 2008
Nations Cup	1:54.5710	(Australia) Paul Stokell	Lamborghini Diablo GTR	23 October 2003
Formula Ford	1:57.1461	(New Zealand) Mitch Evans	Mygale SJ07A	23 October 2009
Aussie Racing Cars	2:06.7819	(Australia) Kyle Clews	Commodore-Yamaha	23 October 2009
V8 Ute Racing Series	2:14.5591	(Australia) Ryal Harris	Holden Commodore VE SS	18 October 2007
HQ Holden	2:29.9498	(Australia) Steve Haley	Holden HQ	18 October 1998

== See also ==
- Sports on the Gold Coast, Queensland
