= Honda Indy =

Honda Indy may refer to several IndyCar Series races sponsored by Honda:

- Honda Indy Toronto
- Honda Indy Edmonton
- Honda Indy Grand Prix of Alabama
- Honda Indy Grand Prix of Sonoma
- Honda Indy 200 at Mid-Ohio
- Honda Indy 225 at Pikes Peak
- Honda Indy 300 at Surfers Paradise
