= Caratti =

Caratti is an Italian surname. Notable people with the surname include:

- Cristiano Caratti (born 1970), Italian tennis player
- Aaron Caratti (born 1980), Australian race driver
