= Rob Nguyen =

Australian racing car driver

- Nationality: (Australia) Australian
- Born: 18 August 1980 (age 46) Brisbane, Queensland
- Retired: 2005

International Formula 3000
- Years active: 2002–2003
- Teams: Team Astromega; BCN Competición
- Starts: 15
- Wins: 0
- Poles: 0
- Fastest laps: 0
- Best finish: 13th in 2002

Previous series
- 2001 2004: German Formula VW; Formula Holden 4000

Robert Hoang Nguyen (born 18 August 1980 in Brisbane) is an Australian racing car driver of Vietnamese descent who competed in the 2002 and part of the 2003 International Formula 3000 (which is now known as Formula 2) seasons before running out of money. He was noted for coming straight into F3000 after only nine previous car races in his life and was at one stage regarded as a potential major talent.

== Career ==
=== Early career ===
After growing up in Australia, Nguyen was sent to the University of Lausanne, Switzerland to study Business in 2000. As a reward for his studies, his parents paid for him to have a test run in a Formula Opel car at an Austrian racing school run by Walter Penker. His first ever run in a racing car was impressive enough for Penker to invite him to take part in a full season of German Formula VW in 2001. Racing under a Swiss license, he finished fifth in the final championship standings, with two podium finishes and a pole position. Penker arranged a Formula 3000 test with the Team Astromega, and Nguyen was promptly signed for 2002.

=== Formula 3000 ===
==== 2002 ====
Nguyen lined up for the first International Formula 3000 race of the 2005 season in Brazil for the Team Astromega only fifteen months after first sitting in a single-seater racing car and only nine races of the German Formula VW series behind him. Nevertheless, he proved a competent performer despite his lack of experience, finishing thirteenth on his début. He finished fifth in the sixth race of the season at the Nürburgring, scoring two points which remained his tally for his impressive first year. He was involved in a spectacular collision with Ricardo Mauricio at Monza, when the Brazilian driver hit the back of Nguyen's car and rolled before landing on its wheels and catching fire. However, he did set the fastest time at a test session on the same circuit in June of the same year, beating the times of eventual champion Sébastien Bourdais and other past and future Formula One drivers Tomáš Enge and Giorgio Pantano.

==== 2003 ====
Nguyen switched to rookie Spanish team BCN Competicion for the 2003 season. He finished eighth at Imola and fifth at Barcelona to score five points under the revised scoring system, but he could only manage thirteenth at the A1-Ring. By the next race, in Monaco, Nguyen had run out of funding and lost his drive with the team, to be replaced by Will Langhorne. There was no other deal available, and Nguyen was forced to drop out of the series. He appeared in a testing session at the end of the year with Coloni, but he did not race again.

=== Formula Holden ===
Nguyen returned to his home country in 2004 to race in the Australian Formula 4000 Holden series with Hocking Motorsport, finishing third in the championship with two wins, five podiums, a pole position and 82 points from the seven races in the series. He was again left without a drive in 2005, and now only races for sport.

== Career summary ==
| Season | Series | Position | Car | Team |
|---|---|---|---|---|
| 2001 | Formula Volkswagen Germany | 5th | ? - Volkswagen | Penker Racing |
| 2002 | International Formula 3000 season | 13th | Lola B2/50 - Zytek | Team Astromega |
| 2003 | International Formula 3000 season | 15th | Lola B2/50 - Zytek | BCN F3000 |
| 2004 | Australian Drivers' Championship | **3rd** | Reynard 97D - Holden | Hocking Motorsport |
| 2004 | Australian Formula 4000 | **3rd** | Reynard 97D - Holden | Hocking Motorsport |
| 2011 | World Time Attack Challenge - Open class | 18th | Honda CRX | 101 Motorsport |
| 2012 | World Time Attack Challenge | 18th | Honda CRX | 101 Motorsport |
| 2012 | Australian Japanese Nationals | **1st** | Honda CRX | 101 Motorsport |
| 2013 | World Time Attack Challenge - Pro-Am class | 6th | Honda CRX | 101 Motorsport |
| 2013 | Australian Japanese Nationals | 10th | Honda CRX | 101 Motorsport |
| 2014 | World Time Attack Challenge - Pro-Am class | 4th | Honda CRX | 101 Motorsport |
| 2014 | Australian Japanese Nationals | **1st** | Honda CRX | 101 Motorsport |
| 2015 | World Time Attack Challenge - Pro-Am class | **3rd** | Honda CRX | 101 Motorsport |
| 2016 | World Time Attack Challenge - Pro-Am class | **2nd** | Honda CRX | 101 Motorsport |
| 2016 | Australian Japanese Nationals | 10th | Honda CRX | 101 Motorsport |
| 2017 | World Time Attack Challenge - Pro-Am class | **1st** | Honda CRX | 101 Motorsport |

=== Complete International Formula 3000 results ===
(key) (Races in bold indicate pole position; races in italics indicate fastest lap.)

| Year | Entrant | 1 | 2 | 3 | 4 | 5 | 6 | 7 | 8 | 9 | 10 | 11 | 12 | DC | Points |
|---|---|---|---|---|---|---|---|---|---|---|---|---|---|---|---|
| 2002 | Team Astromega | INT; 13 | IMO; 11 | CAT; 14 | A1R; 9 | MON; Ret | NUR; 5 | SIL; 15 | MAG; 11 | HOC; 11 | HUN; 10 | SPA; 15 | MNZ; Ret | 13th | 2 |
| 2003 | BCN F3000 | IMO; 8 | CAT; 5 | A1R; 13 | MON | NUR | MAG | SIL | HOC | HUN | MNZ | | | 15th | 5 |
