= 2004 Australian Drivers' Championship =

Motor racing competition

Seasons
- ← 2003 2005 →

The 2004 Australian Drivers' Championship was an Australian motor racing competition open to Formula 4000 cars. It was the 48th Australian Drivers' Championship and the sixteen and last to be contested by Formula Holden / Formula Brabham / Formula 4000 cars. The championship winner was awarded the 2004 CAMS Gold Star and the Silver Star Trophy was awarded to the winner of the "Silver Star" class which was restricted to approved competitors.

The championship, which was promoted as the 2004 Holden Australian Drivers' Championship, was dominated by reigning Australian Formula Ford Champion Neil McFadyen. McFadyn won six of the eight races and took second place at each of the two Winton Motor Raceway races behind International Formula 3000 returnee Rob Nguyen. With only one race finish off the podium, but no wins, Ty Hanger was the runner up ahead of Nguyen.

== Teams and drivers ==
Entrant	Chassis	No	Drivers	Class	Rounds
Fahey Motorsport	Reynard 91D	6	(Australia) Greg Fahey	S	1, 3
W.I.S.C. Racing	Lola T87/50	8	(Australia) Derek Pingel	S	4
Ralt Australia	Reynard 94D	11	(Australia) Paul Trengove		1–3
Ralt Australia	Reynard 95D	11	(Australia) Michael Joannou		4
Ralt Australia	Reynard 96D	12	(Australia) Neil McFadyen		All
Pure Power Motorsport	Reynard 92D	13	(Australia) Ryan Campbell	S	3
Pure Power Motorsport	Reynard 92D	55	(New Zealand) Christina Orr-West		4
Mantis Racing	Reynard 96D	17	(Australia) Bob Power		1
Mantis Racing	Reynard 96D	17	(Australia) Mark Ellis	S	2
Mantis Racing	Reynard 96D	17	(Australia) Stephen Borness		3–4
Peters Racing	Reynard 91D	24	(Australia) Ian Peters	S	All
National Neon Signs Racing	Reynard 92D	27	(Australia) Terry Clearihan	S	All
Formula Uno Racing	Reynard 92D	32	(Australia) Ricky Occhipinti		1–2
Hanger Racing	Reynard 92D	35	(Australia) Christopher Farrell	S	2
Hanger Racing	Reynard 92D	35	(Australia) Ray Hanger	S	3–4
Hanger Racing	Reynard 95D	48	(Australia) Ty Hanger		All
Arlec CRD Motorsport	Reynard 95D	49	(Australia) Rohan Carrig	S	All
Just Part Magazines	Reynard 97D	50	(Australia) Mark West		All
Hocking Motorsport	Reynard 97D	74	(Australia) Rob Nguyen		All

== Calendar ==
The championship was contested over a four-round series with two races per round.

Round		Circuit	Date	Pole position	Fastest lap	Winning driver	Winning team
1	R1	Mallala Motor Sport Park (Mallala, South Australia)	9 May	(Australia) Neil McFadyen	(Australia) Neil McFadyen	(Australia) Neil McFadyen	Ralt Australia
1	R2	Mallala Motor Sport Park (Mallala, South Australia)	9 May		(Australia) Neil McFadyen	(Australia) Neil McFadyen	Ralt Australia
2	R1	(Victoria (state)) Winton Motor Raceway (Benalla, Victoria)	6 June	(Australia) Rob Nguyen	(Australia) Rob Nguyen	(Australia) Rob Nguyen	Hocking Motorsport
2	R2	(Victoria (state)) Winton Motor Raceway (Benalla, Victoria)	6 June		(Australia) Rob Nguyen	(Australia) Rob Nguyen	Hocking Motorsport
3	R1	Oran Park Raceway (Sydney, New South Wales)	27 June	(Australia) Neil McFadyen	(Australia) Neil McFadyen	(Australia) Neil McFadyen	Ralt Australia
3	R2	Oran Park Raceway (Sydney, New South Wales)	27 June		(Australia) Neil McFadyen	(Australia) Neil McFadyen	Ralt Australia
4	R1	Eastern Creek International Raceway (Sydney, New South Wales)	1 August	(Australia) Neil McFadyen	(Australia) Rob Nguyen	(Australia) Neil McFadyen	Ralt Australia
4	R2	Eastern Creek International Raceway (Sydney, New South Wales)	1 August		(Australia) Rob Nguyen	(Australia) Neil McFadyen	Ralt Australia

The winner of each round (for presentation purposes only) was determined by the aggregation of Championship points awarded in that round.

== Points system ==
Gold Start points were awarded on a 20–15–12–10–8–6–4–3–2–1 basis to the first ten outright finishers in each race.
Silver Star points were awarded on a 20–15–12–10–8–6–4–3–2–1 basis to the first ten Silver Star class finishers in each race.

== Standings ==
Position	Driver	No.	Car	Entrant	Mallala		Winton		Oran Pk		Eastern Ck		Total
Position	Driver	No.	Car	Entrant	R1	R2	R1	R2	R1	R2	R1	R2	Total
GOLD STAR
1	Neil McFadyen	11	Reynard 96D Holden	Ralt Australia	20	20	15	15	20	20	20	20	150
2	Ty Hanger	48	Reynard 95D Holden	Hanger Racing	10	12	12	12	15	15	15	15	106
3	Rob Nguyen	74	Reynard 97D Holden	Hocking Motorsport	-	-	20	20	6	12	12	12	82
4	Ian Peters	24	Reynard 91D Holden	Peters Racing	6	8	8	8	4	8	4	10	56
5	Terry Clearihan	27	Reynard 92D Holden	NNS Racing	-	3	10	10	10	10	10	-	53
6	Paul Trengove	12	Reynard 94D Holden	Ralt Australia	15	15	-	-	12	-	-	-	42
7	Mark West	50	Reynard 97D Holden; Reynard 98D Holden	Just Part Magazines	8	6	-	6	-	-	6	8	34
8	Ricky Occhipinti	32	Reynard 97D Holden	Formula Uno Racing	12	10	-	-	-	-	-	-	22
9	Rohan Carrig	49	Reynard 92D Holden	Arlec CRD Motorsport	-	4	4	2	2	6	-	3	21
10	Stephen Borness	17	Reynard 96D Holden	Mantis Racing	-	-	-	-	8	-	8	-	16
11	Michael Joannou	12	Reynard 94D Holden; Reynard 95D Holden	Ralt Australia	-	-	6	3	-	-	-	6	15
12	Greg Fahey	5	Reynard 91D Holden	Fahey Motorsport	4	2	2	1	1	-	-	-	10
13	Ray Hanger	35	Reynard 92D Holden	Hanger Racing	-	-	-	-	-	4	2	2	8
14	Derek Pingel	8	Lola T87/50 Holden	WISC Racing	-	-	-	-	-	-	3	4	7
15	Mark Ellis	17	Reynard-Holden	Mantis Racing	-	-	-	4	-	-	-	-	4
16	Ryan Campbell	13	Reynard-Holden	Pure Power Racing	-	-	-	-	3	-	-	-	3
16	Chris Farrell	35	Reynard 92D Holden	Hanger Racing	-	-	3	-	-	-	-	-	3
18	Cristina Orr	55	Reynard 92D Holden	Pure Power Racing	-	-	-	-	-	-	1	1	2
SILVER STAR
1	Ian Peters	24	Reynard 91D Holden	Peters Racing	20	20	15	15	15	15	15	20	135
2	Terry Clearihan	27	Reynard 92D Holden	NNS Racing	-	12	20	20	20	20	20	-	112
3	Rohan Carrig	49	Reynard 92D Holden	Arlec CRD Motorsport	-	15	12	10	10	12	-	12	71
4	Greg Fahey	5	Reynard 91D Holden	Fahey Motorsport	15	10	8	8	8	-	-	-	49
5	Ray Hanger	35	Reynard 92D Holden	Hanger Racing	-	-	-	-	-	10	10	10	30
6	Derek Pingel	8	Lola T87/50 Holden	WISC Racing	-	-	-	-	-	-	12	15	27
7	Mark Ellis	17	Reynard-Holden	Mantis Racing	-	-	-	12	-	-	-	-	12
7	Ryan Campbell	13	Reynard-Holden	Pure Power Racing	-	-	-	-	12	-	-	-	12
9	Chris Farrell	35	Reynard 92D Holden	Hanger Racing	-	-	10	-	-	-	-	-	10
