= 2005 Australian Drivers' Championship =

Motor racing competition

Seasons
- ← 2004 2006 →

The 2005 Australian Drivers' Championship was a CAMS sanctioned national motor racing title for drivers of cars conforming to Formula 3 regulations. It was the first time Formula 3 had contested the Australian Drivers' Championship, with Formula Holden/Formula Brabham/Formula 4000 being demoted from ADC status after 16 years. The title was contested over an eight-round, 16 race series with the winner awarded the 2005 CAMS Gold Star. The series, which was officially known as the Kumho Tyres Australian Formula 3 Championship for the Australian Drivers' Championship, was organised and administered by Formula 3 Australia Inc. It is recognised by the Confederation of Australian Motor Sport as the 49th Australian Drivers' Championship and as the fifth Australian Formula 3 Championship.

Aaron Caratti won the series driving a Dallara F304-Renault. Caratti won eight of the 16 races and finished 32 points ahead of nearest rival, Michael Trimble (Dallara F304). The margin to third place was again 32 points with Chris Alajajian (Dallara F304-Renault) filling the position. In addition to Caratti's eight race wins, Trimble took four wins and Alajajian two with single victories being taken by returning former F3 champion Michael Caruso (Dallara F301 Alfa Romeo) and Ian Dyk (Dallara F304 Opel).

== Calendar ==
The championship was contested over an eight-round series with two races per round.

Rd	Circuit	State	Date
1	Wakefield Park Raceway	New South Wales	26–27 February
2	Mallala Motor Sport Park	South Australia	16–17 April
3	Phillip Island Grand Prix Circuit	Victoria	21–22 May
4	Queensland Raceway	Queensland	2–3 July
5	Eastern Creek International Raceway	New South Wales	23–24 July
6	Phillip Island Grand Prix Circuit	Victoria	20–21 August
7	Eastern Creek International Raceway	New South Wales	4–6 November
8	Eastern Creek International Raceway	New South Wales	3–4 December

== Class structure ==
Cars competed in two classes:

- Formula 3 Championship - for cars constructed in accordance with the FIA Formula 3 regulations that applied in the year of manufacture between 1 January 1995 and 31 December 2004.
- Formula 3 Trophy Class - for cars constructed in accordance with the FIA Formula 3 regulations that applied in the year of manufacture between 1 January 1995 and 31 December 1998.

The relevant FIA Formula 3 regulations were subject to specific amendments for Australian competition, as outlined in the championship regulations.

== Points system ==
Formula 3 Championship points were awarded on a 20–15–12–10–8–6–4–3–2–1 basis for the first ten Championship class places in each race. One bonus point was awarded to the driver attaining pole position for the Championship class for each race. One bonus point was awarded to the driver setting the fastest Championship class race lap in each race, provided that the driver was a classified finisher in that race.

Trophy Class points were awarded on the same basis as Formula 3 Championship points.

== Championship results ==
Position	Driver	No.	Car	Entrant	Wakefield Park		Mallala		Phillip Island		Qld Raceway		Eastern Creek		Phillip Island		Eastern Creek		Eastern Creek		Total
Position	Driver	No.	Car	Entrant	R1	R2	R1	R2	R1	R2	R1	R2	R1	R2	R1	R2	R1	R2	R1	R2	Total
1	Aaron Caratti	23	Dallara F304 Renault Sodemo	Astuti Competition; David Borg	16	17	-	20	20	15	21	22	22	22	22	22	8	15	-	-	242
2	Michael Trimble	20; 10	Dallara F304 Spiess Opel	Team BRM; Astuti Motorsport	12	20	15	10	15	20	16	-	10	10	15	15	10	-	21	21	210
3	Chris Alajajian	22	Dallara F304 Renault Sodemo	Jack Hillerman Smash	21	12	11	13	4	-	12	15	15	15	-	-	13	20	16	11	178
4	Chris Gilmour	17	Dallara F301 Spiess Opel; Dallara F304 Spiess Opel	Chris Gilmour	6	10	8	8	10	-	8	10	12	12	12	10	4	12	12	8	142
5	Tim Macrow	7	Dallara F301 Spiess Opel	Tim Macrow Racing	-	-	13	5	13	8	10	12	-	-	-	6	6	-	-	-	73
6	Leanne Tander	27; 42	Dallara F301 Alfa Romeo; Dallara F304	Picollo Scuderia Corse; Garth Tander Racing	-	-	-	-	8	8	-	-	-	-	-	-	3	10	8	15	52
7	Michael Caruso	27	Dallara F301 Alfa Romeo	Picollo Scuderia Corse	8	-	20	15	-	-	-	-	-	-	-	-	2	3	-	-	48
8	Neil McFadyen	8; 59	Dallara F304	Team BRM	-	-	-	-	-	-	-	-	-	-	10	12	16	4	-	-	42
9	Mat Sofi	2	Dallara F301 Fiat	Benchmark Motorsport	3	3	-	-	-	-	-	-	8	8	4	-	-	-	-	-	26
10	Ricky Occhipinti	32	Dallara F301 Spiess Opel	Formula Uno Racing	-	4	6	6	-	10	-	-	-	-	-	-	-	-	-	-	26
11	Tim Slade	8	Dallara F301 Spiess Opel; Dallara F304 Spiess Opel	Bronte Rundle	10	8	4	3	-	-	-	-	-	-	-	-	-	-	-	-	25
12	James Cressey	8	Dallara F304	Gawler Farm Machinery	-	-	-	-	-	-	-	-	-	-	-	-	-	-	10	12	22
13	Ian Dyk	4	Dallara F304	Gawler Farm Machinery	-	-	-	-	-	-	-	-	-	-	-	-	20	1	-	-	21
14	Karl Reindler	1	Dallara F304 Spiess Opel	Bronte Rundle	-	-	-	-	7	12	-	-	-	-	-	-	-	-	-	-	19
15	Stephen Borness	27	Dallara F301 Alfa Romeo	Celebrity Racing	-	-	-	-	-	-	-	-	-	6	-	-	-	-	6	6	18
16	Sam Abay	25; 10	Dallara F301 Spiess Opel	Astuti Competition	2	-	-	-	-	-	6	8	-	-	-	-	-	-	-	-	16
17	David Borg	24	Dallara F301; Dallara F304 Renault	David Borg	-	-	-	-	-	-	2	-	6	3	-	-	-	-	-	-	11
18	Cody Liebel	96	Dallara F301 Alfa Romeo	Picollo Scuderia Corse	1	1	3	2	-	-	-	-	-	4	-	-	-	-	-	-	11
19	Nathan Caratti	24	Dallara F304 Renault Sodemo	David Borg	-	-	-	-	-	-	4	6	-	-	-	-	1	-	-	-	11
20	Nic Jordan	3	Dallara F301 Spiess Opel	Bronte Rundle	4	6	-	-	-	-	-	-	-	-	-	-	-	-	-	-	10
21	Daynom Templeman	27	Dallara F301	Rudolf Masi	-	-	-	-	-	-	-	-	-	-	8	-	-	-	-	-	8
23	Bevan Carrick	60	Dallara F304 Spiess Opel	Cool Temp Pty Ltd	-	-	-	-	-	-	3	4	-	-	-	-	-	-	-	-	7
24	John Pettit	58	Dallara F301 Renault Sodemo	Kevin Miller	-	-	-	-	3	4	-	-	-	-	-	-	-	-	-	-	7
25	Nigel Stones	58	Dallara F301 Renault Sodemo	Property Solutions Group	-	-	-	-	-	-	-	-	4	2	-	-	-	-	-	-	6
26	John Boothman	12	Dallara F301	JB Racing	-	-	-	-	-	-	-	-	-	-	-	-	-	-	-	4	4
27	Michael Ho	9	Dallara F304	Team BRM	-	-	-	-	-	-	-	-	-	-	-	-	-	4	-	-	4
28	Greg Fahey	58	Dallara F301	Kevin Miller	-	-	-	-	-	-	-	-	-	-	-	2	-	-	-	-	2
29	Kevin Miller	58	Dallara F301 Renault Sodemo	Kevin Miller	-	2	-	-	-	-	-	-	-	-	-	-	-	-	-	-	2
30	Andrew Mill	58	Dallara F301	Property Solutions Group Racing	-	-	-	-	-	-	-	-	-	-	-	-	-	2	-	-	2
31	Jeffrey Lee	9	Dallara F304	Team BRM	-	-	-	-	-	-	-	-	-	-	-	-	-	1	-	-	1

Kumho Tyres Trophy Class Series
Position	Driver	No.	Car	Entrant	Wakefield Park		Mallala		Phillip Island		Qld Raceway		Eastern Creek		Phillip Island		Eastern Creek		Eastern Creek		Total
Position	Driver	No.	Car	Entrant	R1	R2	R1	R2	R1	R2	R1	R2	R1	R2	R1	R2	R1	R2	R1	R2	Total
1	Bill Maddocks	88	Dallara F396 TOMS Toyota	Bill Maddocks	12	15	-	-	22	13	15	21	15	12	15	15	-	-	15	12	182
2	Graeme Holmes	21	Dallara F398 Fiat	Graeme Holmes	-	-	15	15	-	21	-	-	14	22	-	-	22	22	21	16	167
3	Marc Williams	4	Dallara F398 Spiess Opel	Bronte Rundle	15	12	22	22	-	-	21	1	-	-	22	22	-	-	1	21	160
4	Rod Anderson	37	Dallara F396 TOMS Toyota; Dallara 95/96	Rod Anderson	-	-	-	12	15	-	-	-	20	15	12	12	15	15	-	-	116
5	Lauren Gray	87	Dallara F396 Toyota	Softelm Pty Limited	-	-	-	-	-	-	12	15	10	6	10	10	-	-	12	12	88
6	John Boothman	12	Dallara F396 Fiat	John Boothman	-	-	-	-	12	15	-	-	-	-	-	-	12	12	-	-	51
7	Tim Berryman	5	Dallara F396 Fiat	Michael Navybox	22	22	-	-	-	-	-	-	-	-	-	-	-	-	-	-	44
8	Ian Haines	68	Dallara F397 Mugen Honda	Hair on the Edge	-	-	-	-	-	-	-	-	-	8	-	-	-	-	-	-	8
