= 2008 Australian Carrera Cup Championship =

Australian motor racing competition

Seasons
- ← 2007 2011 →

The 2008 Australian Carrera Cup Championship was a CAMS sanctioned motor racing title for drivers of Porsche 911 GT3 Cup Cars. The championship, which was contested over nine rounds across five different states, began on 21 February 2008 at the Clipsal 500 and finished on 26 October at the Gold Coast Indy 300. It was the sixth and last Australian Carrera Cup Championship until the 2011 season.

Craig Baird dominated the series, winning 14 of the series 25 races and the New Zealander driving for Fitzgerald Racing became the first driver to win the series twice, adding to his 2006 championship win. West Australian Dean Fiore was the runner up for Sonic Motor Racing, taking four wins and dominating the Mount Panorama round. Third was David Russell in the Sherrin Motor Sport car.

The most dramatic moment of the season was when category managers Sherrin Motor Sport collapsed, leaving the series briefly in limbo. With the assistance of CAMS and Porsche Australia, Glenn Ridge owned company Q Media Events took over the running of the series.

== Teams and drivers ==
The following teams and drivers have competed in the Championship.

Team	No	Driver
Fitzgerald Racing	3	(New Zealand) Craig Baird
Fitzgerald Racing	4	(Australia) Andrew Moffat (Australia) David Russell
Fitzgerald Racing	27	(Australia) Barton Mawer
Sonic Motor Racing Services	5	(Australia) Dean Fiore
Sonic Motor Racing Services	6	(Australia) Bryce Washington
Sonic Motor Racing Services	7	(Australia) Rodney Jane
Sonic Motor Racing Services	9	(Australia) James Moffat
Jaimie Vedda Racing	8	(Australia) Rodney Forbes
Juniper Racing	11	(Australia) Shaun Juniper
Hallmarc Racing	12	(Australia) Marc Cini
Supabarn Motorsport	14	(Australia) James Koundouris
Supabarn Motorsport	15	(Australia) Theo Koundouris
Twigg Motorsport	18	(Australia) Max Twigg
Sherrin Motor Sport	19	(Australia) Grant Sherrin
Sherrin Motor Sport	22	(Australia) David Russell
Sherrin Motor Sport	72	(Australia) Iain Sherrin (New Zealand) Daniel Gaunt* (Australia) Paul Stokell
Paul Cruikshank Racing	23	(Australia) Aaron Caratti
Jim Richards Racing	38	(Australia) David Wall
Greg Murphy Racing	47	(Australia) Sam Walter (New Zealand) Darryn Henderson (Australia) Christian Jones
Greg Murphy Racing	51	(New Zealand) Jono Lester
Greg Murphy Racing	66	(Australia) Peter Hill
Greg Murphy Racing	72	(Australia) Daniel Pappas
Tekno Racing	94	(Australia) Jonathon Webb*

^{*} Guest drivers ineligible for points.

== Race calendar ==
Round	Date	Circuit	Location	Winning driver
1	21–24 February	(South Australia) Adelaide Street Circuit	Adelaide, South Australia	(New Zealand) Craig Baird
2	13–16 March	(Victoria (state)) Albert Park Street Circuit	Melbourne, Victoria	(New Zealand) Craig Baird
3	4–6 April	(New South Wales) Wakefield Park	Goulburn, New South Wales	(Australia) Aaron Caratti
4	9–11 May	(Western Australia) Barbagallo Raceway	Perth, Western Australia	(New Zealand) Craig Baird
5	7–9 June	(Victoria (state)) Sandown Raceway	Melbourne, Victoria	(New Zealand) Craig Baird
6	4–6 July	Queensland Raceway	Ipswich, Queensland	(New Zealand) Craig Baird
7	12–14 September	(Victoria (state)) Phillip Island Grand Prix Circuit	Phillip Island, Victoria	(New Zealand) Craig Baird
8	9–12 October	(New South Wales) Mount Panorama Circuit	Bathurst, New South Wales	(Australia) Dean Fiore
9	23–26 October	(Queensland) Surfers Paradise Street Circuit	Surfers Paradise, Queensland	(Australia) James Moffat

Each of the nine rounds was contested over three races.

== Points system ==
Championship points were awarded on 60–54–48–42–36–30–27–24–21–18–15–12–9–6–6–3–3–3–3–3 basis to the first twenty finishers in each race with 1 point awarded to each driver finishing in positions from 21st through to last.

== Results and standings ==
=== Drivers' championship ===
Pos	Driver	ADE			ALB				WAK			BAR			SAN			QLD			PHI			BAT			SUR			Pen.	Pts
1	(New Zealand) Craig Baird	2	1	2	5	1	1	1	3	3	3	3	1	1	1	1	2	1	1	1	1	2	2	2	13	3	1	1	13		1458
2	(Australia) Dean Fiore	1	3	4	2	2	2	2	2	2	2	5	13	6	17	Ret	5	2	2	3	8	5	6	1	1	1	11	13	6		1122
3	(Australia) David Russell	3	2	1	7	3	3	5	8	18	Ret	4	5	2	2	8	4	6	4	Ret	5	6	1	9	5	4	2	2	12		1017
4	(Australia) James Moffat	6	5	7	Ret	Ret	11	18	6	5	Ret	6	2	3	5	3	15	3	3	2	3	3	14	4	3	2	4	4	1		939
5	(Australia) Bryce Washington	13	6	5	3	4	4	Ret	4	4	4	7	4	Ret	4	4	3	5	5	6	4	4	3	3	2	11	DNS	9	Ret		906
6	(Australia) Aaron Caratti	4	9	6	1	12	5	3	1	1	1	1	Ret	9	Ret	Ret	10	4	11	Ret	2	1	5	6	4	Ret	5	5	2	57	876
7	(Australia) David Wall	5	4	3	4	19	10	Ret	9	Ret	10	2	8	7	3	2	1	8	7	5	6	7	4	12	8	13	3	3	3		870
8	(Australia) Rodney Jane	10	8	8	6	5	8	6	14	7	9	Ret	Ret	10	6	6	6	9	9	7	9	9	7	7	7	5	12	Ret	7		615
9	(Australia) Rodney Forbes	9	Ret	9	9	9	12	9	7	8	5	13	7	8	15	Ret	9	7	6	4	7	8	8	5	6	12	Ret	7	5		606
10	(Australia) Barton Mawer	8	7	12	8	6	7	7	5	6	17	8	3	4	18	Ret	11	20	15	16	10	17	17	8	9	6	7	Ret	Ret		510
11	(Australia) James Koundouris	7	Ret	16	12	14	13	Ret	10	9	7	Ret	10	11	9	10	12	11	12	Ret	11	11	9	10	10	7	DNS	8	8		396
12	(New Zealand) Jono Lester	11	Ret	15	Ret	11	Ret	13	11	10	6	Ret	6	5	8	5	7	12	10	13											300
13	(Australia) Theo Koundouris	Ret	DNS	13	13	13	19	15	13	11	11	10	9	17	10	Ret	14	19	13	10	13	13	12	14	12	8	13	11	10		285
14	(Australia) Max Twigg	Ret	11	10	14	7	9	8	12	14	Ret	9	Ret	19	Ret	Ret	Ret	13	20	15	17	10	15	11	11	14	8	14	DNS		261
15	(Australia) Peter Hill	12	10	17	10	8	Ret	11	16	15	15	11	11	12	12	9	16	16	17	12	14	15	13								222
16	(Australia) Shaun Juniper	14	14	11	17	15	14	10	15	16	14	Ret	Ret	15	14	13	18	17	19	14	15	14	11	13	14	9	DNS	12	Ret		186
17	(Australia) Marc Cini	15	15	14	16	17	17	16	17	17	16	12	Ret	16	13	Ret	19	18	18	11	16	16	16	16	16	10	9	15	11		165
18	(Australia) Andrew Moffat	17	12	Ret	11	Ret	16	12	18	13	8	Ret	12	14	11	12	13	15	16	Ret											144
19	(Australia) Paul Stokell														7	7	8	10	8	9											141
20	(Australia) Grant Sherrin	16	13	18	15	16	15	14	19	Ret	13	14	15	13	16	11	17	14	14	8											126
21	(Australia) Christian Jones																										6	6	4		102
22	(Australia) Daniel Pappas																										10	10	9		57
23	(Australia) Sam Walter																				12	12	10								42
24	(Australia) Iain Sherrin	18	16	19	Ret	18	18	17				15	14	18																	33
25	(Australia) Darryn Henderson																							15	15	Ret					12
	(Australia) Jonathon Webb				Ret	10	6	4																							
	(New Zealand) Daniel Gaunt								Ret	12	12																				

Colour	Result
Gold	Winner
Silver	Second place
Bronze	Third place
Green	Points classification
Blue	Non-points classification
Blue	Non-classified finish (NC)
Purple	Retired, not classified (Ret)
Red	Did not qualify (DNQ)
Red	Did not pre-qualify (DNPQ)
Black	Disqualified (DSQ)
White	Did not start (DNS)
White	Withdrew (WD)
White	Race cancelled (C)
Blank	Did not practice (DNP)
Blank	Did not arrive (DNA)
Blank	Excluded (EX)

== See also ==
- Australian Carrera Cup Championship
- Porsche Supercup
- Porsche 911 GT3
- Porsche 997
