= V8 Supercar Challenge =

Annual car racing event in Australia

(Queensland) V8 Supercar Challenge
- Race Information
Venue	Surfers Paradise Street Circuit
Number of times held	15
First held	1994
Last held	2009
- Race Format
- Race 1
Laps	34
Distance	150 km
- Race 2
Laps	34
Distance	150 km
- Race 3
Laps	34
Distance	150 km
- Race 4
Laps	34
Distance	150 km
- Last Event (2009)
- Overall Winner
(Australia) Mark Winterbottom	Ford Performance Racing
- Race Winners
(Australia) Mark Winterbottom	Ford Performance Racing
(Australia) Garth Tander	Holden Racing Team
(Australia) Craig Lowndes	Triple Eight Race Engineering
(Australia) Mark Winterbottom	Ford Performance Racing

The V8 Supercar Challenge was an annual V8 Supercars event held each October at the Surfers Paradise Street Circuit in Surfers Paradise, Queensland, Australia. First run in 1994, the sprint event was a support race to the Gold Coast Indy 300 and from 2010 was superseded by an endurance format known as the Gold Coast 600.

== History ==
=== Background ===
The Gold Coast, of which Surfers Paradise is a suburb, had long had an association with touring cars through Surfers Paradise International Raceway in the suburb of Carrara. The track held numerous rounds of the Australian Touring Car Championship (ATCC), a previous incarnation of Supercars, between 1969 and 1987.

=== Non-championship era ===
The Gold Coast Indy 300 was first run in 1991, however it was not until 1994 that touring cars joined the event. The event, featuring cars from the ATCC, was run as a non-championship exhibition round, supporting the then CART FedEx Championship Series event. In the next two years, cars from the two-litre Australian Super Touring Championship were a support category at the event; in 1995 as the sole touring car category and in 1996 one of two touring car support categories alongside the return of the ATCC cars. Greg Murphy won the Super Touring event in both years for Brad Jones Racing. From 1997 onwards, the event returned to solely featuring five-litre ATCC cars, the category that was now known as V8 Supercars. The 1998 event was notable for providing Mark Larkham with the only event win of his decade-long full-time touring car career, albeit at a non-championship event. Due to the often crash-filled nature of the rounds, its non-championship status and the relatively quick turn-around time between the event and the Bathurst 1000, some teams used older model cars at the event, such as in 1999 when Paul Radisich won the event with a 1998-spec Ford EL Falcon, instead of their usual AU Falcon. Radisich went on to win five consecutive races at the event in 1999 and 2000.

=== Championship era ===
From 2002, the event became an official V8 Supercars championship round, with the series given equal billing to the CART event. Jason Bargwanna won the first championship event at the circuit, scoring victory on a countback after finishing the weekend level on points with Craig Lowndes. The 2004 event was notable for Marcos Ambrose being fined for brake-testing Rick Kelly following Ambrose's race victory on the Saturday. Jamie Whincup clean-swept the final sprint event at the circuit in 2008 on the way to his first championship victory. From 2002 until 2008, the most common race format was three races over the weekend, with one on Saturday and two on Sunday. The driver with the most points accumulated over the three races was awarded first place for the weekend, with no driver able to achieve a repeat event victory in this time.

=== Transition into Endurance Format ===
In late 2008, it was announced the IndyCar Series would not be returning to the Gold Coast in 2009, bringing to an end the Indy era. A1 Grand Prix, which had been scheduled to replace IndyCar, then pulled out of the event with only weeks to go, leaving V8 Supercars as the lead category for the first time in the Gold Coast event's history. Subsequently, to fill the last minute hole in the schedule, the 2009 event expanded its format to two 150 km races each on Saturday and Sunday. This format changed into two 300 km races one on saturday and one on sunday into 2010 and beyond with the introduction of the Gold Coast 600 name.

== Winners ==
Events which were not championship rounds are indicated by a pink background.

Year	Driver	Team	Car	Report
1994	(Australia) John Bowe	Dick Johnson Racing	Ford EB Falcon	Report
1995	not held			
1996	(Australia) John Bowe	Dick Johnson Racing	Ford EF Falcon	Report
1997	(Australia) Russell Ingall	Perkins Engineering	Holden VS Commodore	Report
1998	(Australia) Mark Larkham	Larkham Motor Sport	Ford EL Falcon	Report
1999	(New Zealand) Paul Radisich	Dick Johnson Racing	Ford EL Falcon	Report
2000	(New Zealand) Paul Radisich	Dick Johnson Racing	Ford AU Falcon	Report
2001	(Australia) Garth Tander	Garry Rogers Motorsport	Holden VX Commodore	Report
2002	(Australia) Jason Bargwanna	Garry Rogers Motorsport	Holden VX Commodore	
2003	(Australia) Russell Ingall	Stone Brothers Racing	Ford BA Falcon	
2004	(New Zealand) Greg Murphy	Kmart Racing Team	Holden VY Commodore	
2005	(Australia) Craig Lowndes	Triple Eight Race Engineering	Ford BA Falcon	
2006	(Australia) Todd Kelly	Holden Racing Team	Holden VZ Commodore	
2007	(Australia) Garth Tander	HSV Dealer Team	Holden VE Commodore	Report
2008	(Australia) Jamie Whincup	Triple Eight Race Engineering	Ford BF Falcon	Report
2009	(Australia) Mark Winterbottom	Ford Performance Racing	Ford FG Falcon	Report

== Multiple winners ==
=== By driver ===
Wins which did not count towards the championship season are indicated by a pink background.

Event wins	Driver	Years
2	(Australia) John Bowe	1994, 1996
2	(New Zealand) Paul Radisich	1999, 2000
2	(Australia) Russell Ingall	1997, 2003
2	(Australia) Garth Tander	2001, 2007

=== By team ===
Event wins	Team
4	Dick Johnson Racing
2	Garry Rogers Motorsport
2	HSV Dealer Team^{1}
2	Triple Eight Race Engineering

=== By manufacturer ===
Event wins	Manufacturer
9	Ford
6	Holden

Notes

- ^1 – HSV Dealer Team was known as Kmart Racing from 2001 to 2004, hence their statistics are combined.

== Event names and sponsors ==
- 1994: Courier Mail Gold Coast 100
- 1996: EA Sports Touring Cars
- 1997–98: Hog's Breath V8 Supercar Challenge
- 1999, 2007: V8 Supercar Challenge
- 2000: FAI V8 Supercar Challenge
- 2001: Cabcharge V8 Supercar Challenge
- 2002–06: Gillette V8 Supercar Challenge
- 2008: The Coffee Club V8 Supercar Challenge
- 2009: Gold Coast Nikon SuperGP

== See also ==
- Gold Coast Indy 300
- Gold Coast 600
- Surfers Paradise International Raceway
- List of Australian Touring Car Championship races
