= Gold Coast 500 =

Australian Supercars event

(Queensland) Gold Coast 500
- Race Information
Venue	Surfers Paradise Street Circuit
Number of times held	12
First held	2010
- Race Format
- Race 1
Laps	85
Distance	250 km
- Race 2
Laps	85
Distance	250 km
- Last Event (2026)
- Overall Winner
(Australia) Chaz Mostert	Walkinshaw Andretti United
- Race Winners
(Australia) Chaz Mostert	Walkinshaw Andretti United
(Australia) Broc Feeney	Triple Eight Race Engineering

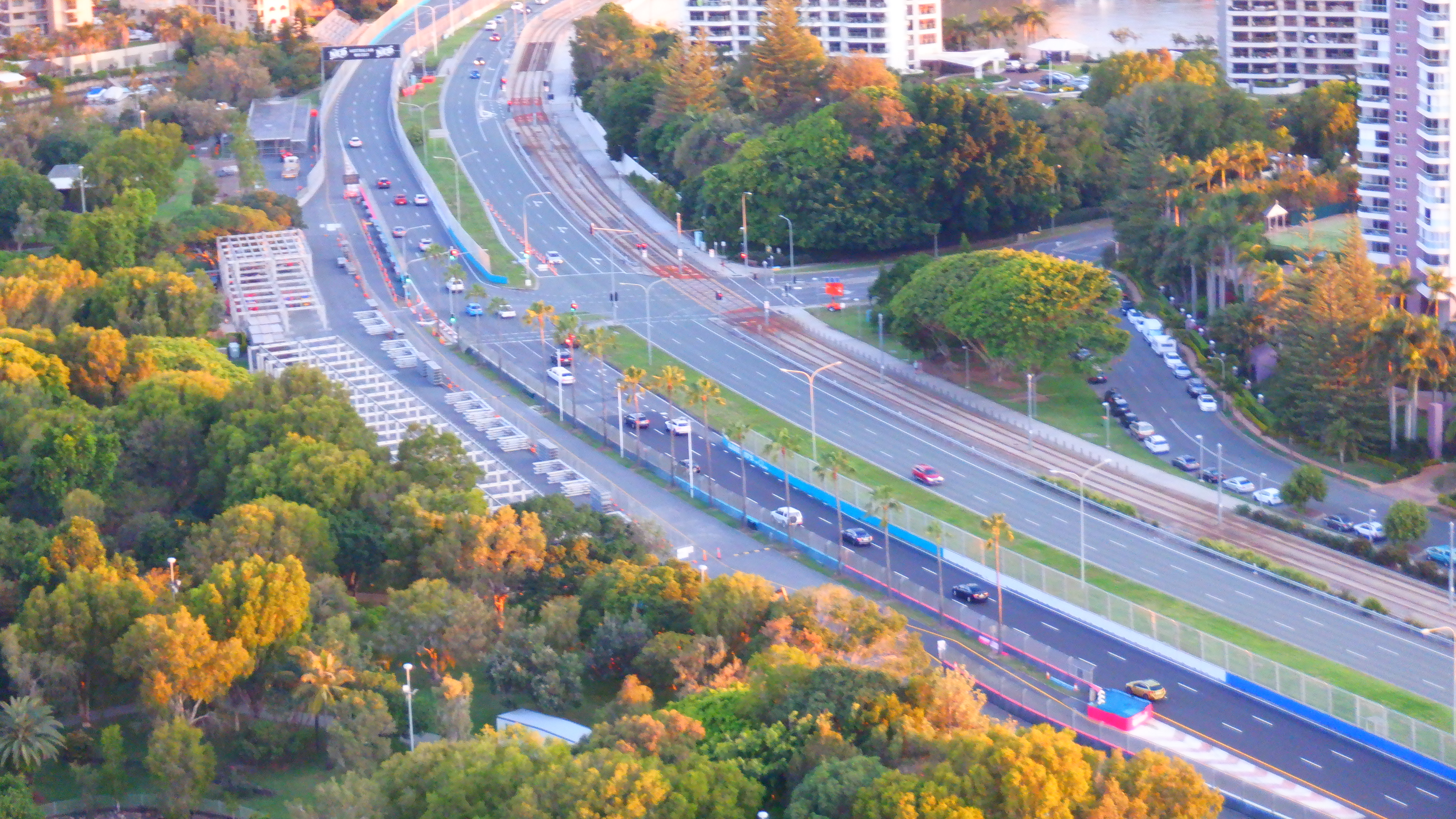
An image taken from the roof of The Inlet, 5 weeks before the event.

The Gold Coast 500 (known for sponsorship reasons as the Boost Mobile Gold Coast 500) is an annual motor racing event for Supercars, held at the Surfers Paradise Street Circuit in Surfers Paradise, Queensland, Australia. The event has been a regular part of the Supercars Championship — and its previous iteration, the V8 Supercars Championship — since 2010.

The event was excluded from the 2020 and 2021 Supercars Championships due to the COVID-19 pandemic, however it returned in 2022. Having previously been held as a two-driver event known as the Gold Coast 600, the event has been held as a single-driver 500 kilometre race since then.

== Format ==
The event is staged over a three-day weekend, from Friday to Sunday. Two thirty-minute practice sessions are held on Friday. Both Saturday and Sunday feature a fifteen-minute qualifying session succeeded by a top ten shootout, the combined results of which decide the grid for the following 250 km races.

In 2018, it was proposed that the event format be changed in 2019 to a single 500 kilometre race on the Sunday, with two qualifying races on the Saturday, a format mirroring the Sandown 500. However, after the teams refused to back the change, it was dropped.

== History ==
=== Background ===
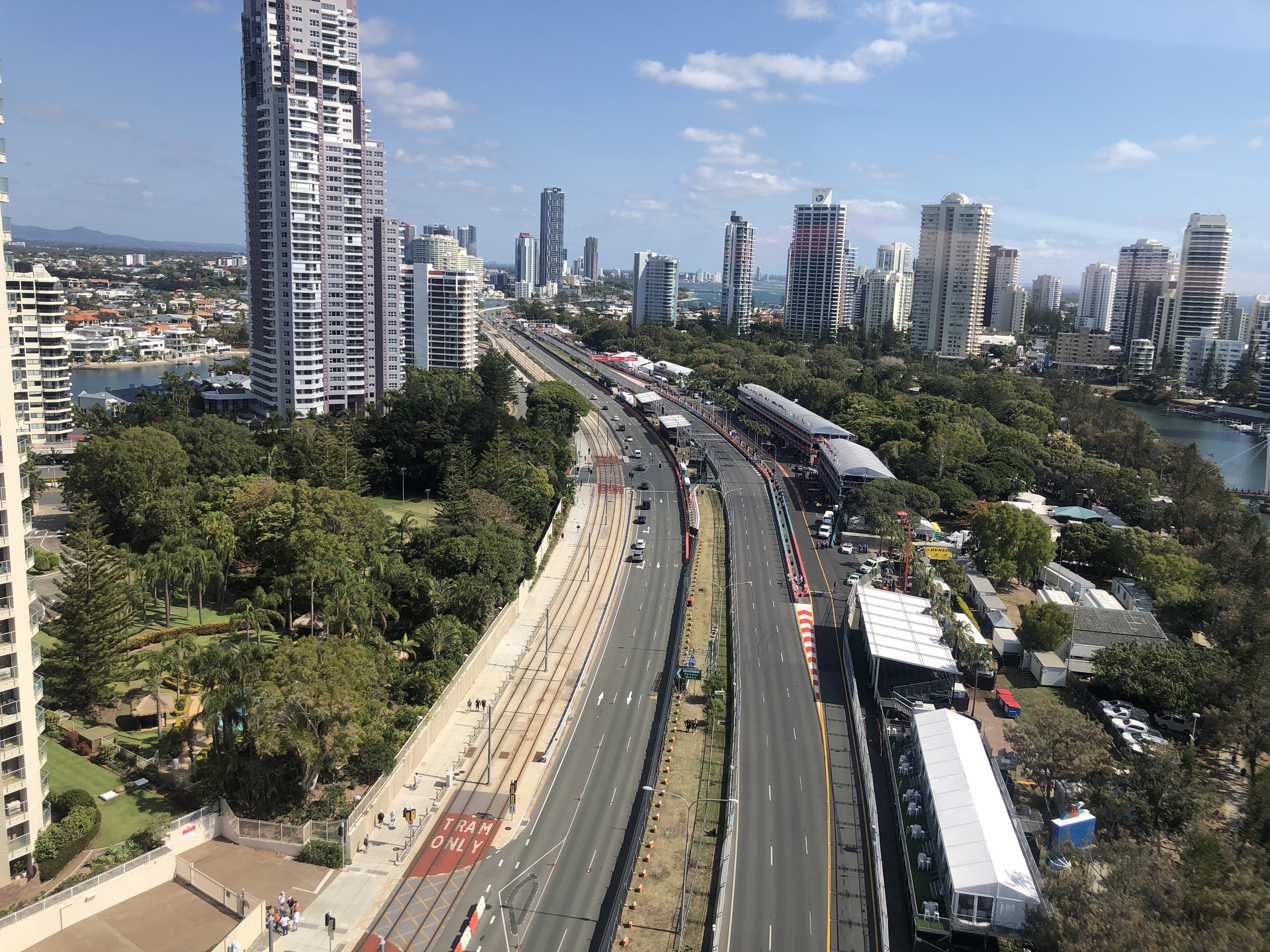
An aerial view of the Surfers Paradise Street Circuit as seen from a helicopter, looking towards the north.

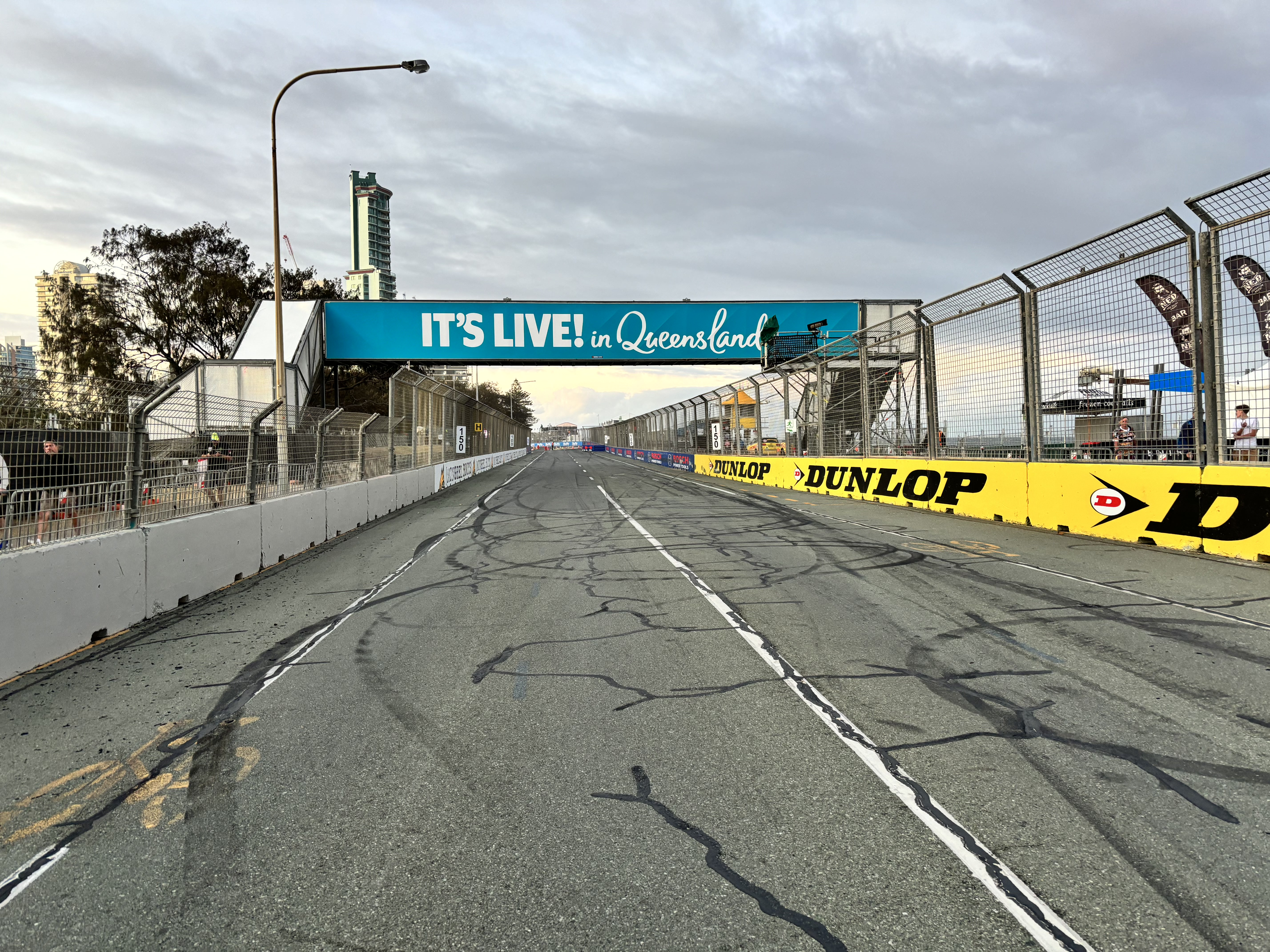
A north-bound view of the circuit on the Main Beach straight. Photo taken post-race.

V8 Supercars had previously competed on the Gold Coast as a support race, most recently known as the V8 Supercar Challenge, to the Gold Coast Indy 300 between 1994 and 2008. However, it was only in 2002 that the event attained championship status, having previously been run as exhibition races.

In late 2008, it was announced the IndyCar Series would not be returning to the Gold Coast in 2009, bringing to an end the Indy era. A1 Grand Prix, which had been scheduled to replace IndyCar, then pulled out of the event with only weeks to go, leaving V8 Supercars as the lead category for the first time in the Gold Coast event's history. Subsequently, to fill the last minute hole in the schedule, the 2009 event expanded its format to two 150 km races each on Saturday and Sunday. The number of points accumulated over the two races determined the individual winner for each day. This signalled the commencement of the endurance era at the Gold Coast event.

=== International co-drivers ===
In 2010, the track was shortened from 4.47 km to 2.96 km, and the event became known as the Gold Coast 600 for the first time. To differentiate the event, each team was required to have at least one driver of international reputation as a co-driver. In 2011, this rule was adjusted such that every car (as opposed to every team) had a driver of international repute as a co-driver. These drivers could be Australian, but had to have a strong international pedigree, such as Australian IndyCar driver Will Power. Two races of 300 km were held over the weekend, with one on both Saturday and Sunday. As per the other V8 Supercars endurance races, the co-driver was required to complete at least one-third of each race distance (34 laps).

The 2010 event itself was notable for a famous battle between Jamie Whincup and Shane van Gisbergen in which Whincup eventually prevailed to take the win. In 2011, the event was overshadowed by the 2011 IZOD IndyCar World Championship tragedy, which occurred one week before the Gold Coast event. This led to the relaxing of the international driver rules, as Holden Racing Team's planned co-driver Dan Wheldon was killed and Ford Performance Racing co-driver Will Power was injured in the 15-car crash. Brad Jones Racing co-driver Tony Kanaan, a close friend of Wheldon, also decided to withdraw from the Gold Coast event following the tragedy. The International Driver Trophy, introduced in 2010, was renamed in Wheldon's honour before the 2011 event.

Also in 2011, Sébastien Bourdais became the first and only driver to win at Surfers Paradise in both a Champ Car (in 2005 and 2007) and a Supercar (in 2011, and then again in 2012). The 2012 event was notable for two large start-line crashes. In the first of which, international driver Ricky Taylor was tipped into a barrel-roll seconds after the start of the race. The race was red flagged, and would eventually require a third attempt at a start following an incident on the second attempt between Nicolas Minassian and Franck Montagny.

=== Enduro Cup ===
For the 2013 event, the requirement for each car to have an international co-driver was removed, due to the increasing costs of hiring overseas drivers. Instead, the event became the third event of the newly formed Pirtek Enduro Cup, along with the series' other two-driver races, the Sandown 500 and the Bathurst 1000. The race format remained the same. In the Sunday race of the 2013 event, David Reynolds took the first win of his V8 Supercars career, driving with Dean Canto. The 2015 event saw another debut win, this time for Jack Perkins, driving with James Courtney for the Holden Racing Team. It was Courtney's return to the sport following nine weeks out with rib and lung injuries suffered in an off-track injury at the Sydney Motorsport Park Super Sprint. In 2016, van Gisbergen won a race at the event for the third consecutive year, driving with French driver Alexandre Prémat, who in winning his first race in Supercars (as the series was now known), joined compatriot Bourdais as a winner at the event.

Chaz Mostert won consecutive Saturday races at the event in 2017 and 2018, driving with Steve Owen and James Moffat respectively. A large thunderstorm hit the circuit during the second 2018 race forcing the abandonment of the race. As less than 50% of the race distance had been completed, no points were awarded. Twelve months later and Mostert wrote off his car in the Saturday top ten shootout, ruling him out for the weekend. Championship leader Scott McLaughlin, who was a chance of sealing the title at the event with two rounds to spare, then had a heavy crash in Sunday qualifying which also ruled him out of the second race. The two races were dominated by Triple Eight Race Engineering with one-two finishes in each race.

The 2020 event was cancelled due to the COVID-19 pandemic.

=== Back to single-driver event ===
In its return to the calendar, the event was scheduled as the finale of the 2021 Supercars Championship, to be held in December. The format also changed to two 250 kilometre single-driver races. The event was however cancelled due to COVID-19 and instead held in 2022.

== Winners ==
Year	Event title	Race	Driver	Team	Car
2010	Armor All Gold Coast 600	1	(Australia) Garth Tander (Australia) Cameron McConville	Holden Racing Team	Holden VE Commodore
2010	Armor All Gold Coast 600	2	(Australia) Jamie Whincup (Australia) Steve Owen	Triple Eight Race Engineering	Holden VE Commodore
2011	Armor All Gold Coast 600	1	(Australia) Jamie Whincup (France) Sébastien Bourdais	Triple Eight Race Engineering	Holden VE Commodore
2011	Armor All Gold Coast 600	2	(Australia) Mark Winterbottom (United Kingdom) Richard Lyons	Ford Performance Racing	Ford FG Falcon
2012	Armor All Gold Coast 600	1	(Australia) Jamie Whincup (France) Sébastien Bourdais	Triple Eight Race Engineering	Holden VE Commodore
2012	Armor All Gold Coast 600	2	(Australia) Will Davison (Finland) Mika Salo	Ford Performance Racing	Ford FG Falcon
2013	Armor All Gold Coast 600	1	(Australia) Craig Lowndes (Australia) Warren Luff	Triple Eight Race Engineering	Holden VF Commodore
2013	Armor All Gold Coast 600	2	(Australia) David Reynolds (Australia) Dean Canto	Rod Nash Racing	Ford FG Falcon
2014	Castrol Edge Gold Coast 600	1	(New Zealand) Shane van Gisbergen (Australia) Jonathon Webb	Tekno Autosports	Holden VF Commodore
2014	Castrol Edge Gold Coast 600	2	(Australia) Jamie Whincup (Australia) Paul Dumbrell	Triple Eight Race Engineering	Holden VF Commodore
2015	Castrol Gold Coast 600	1	(New Zealand) Shane van Gisbergen (Australia) Jonathon Webb	Tekno Autosports	Holden VF Commodore
2015	Castrol Gold Coast 600	2	(Australia) James Courtney (Australia) Jack Perkins	Holden Racing Team	Holden VF Commodore
2016	Castrol Gold Coast 600	1	(New Zealand) Shane van Gisbergen (France) Alexandre Prémat	Triple Eight Race Engineering	Holden VF Commodore
2016	Castrol Gold Coast 600	2	(Australia) Jamie Whincup (Australia) Paul Dumbrell	Triple Eight Race Engineering	Holden VF Commodore
2017	Vodafone Gold Coast 600	1	(Australia) Chaz Mostert (Australia) Steve Owen	Rod Nash Racing	Ford FG X Falcon
2017	Vodafone Gold Coast 600	2	(New Zealand) Scott McLaughlin (France) Alexandre Prémat	DJR Team Penske	Ford FG X Falcon
2018	Vodafone Gold Coast 600	1	(Australia) Chaz Mostert (Australia) James Moffat	Tickford Racing	Ford FG X Falcon
2018	Vodafone Gold Coast 600	2	race abandoned		
2019	Vodafone Gold Coast 600	1	(Australia) Jamie Whincup (Australia) Craig Lowndes	Triple Eight Race Engineering	Holden ZB Commodore
2019	Vodafone Gold Coast 600	2	(New Zealand) Shane van Gisbergen (Australia) Garth Tander	Triple Eight Race Engineering	Holden ZB Commodore
2020	not held due to COVID-19 pandemic				
2021	not held due to COVID-19 pandemic				
2022	Boost Mobile Gold Coast 500	1	(New Zealand) Shane van Gisbergen	Triple Eight Race Engineering	Holden ZB Commodore
2022	Boost Mobile Gold Coast 500	2	(New Zealand) Shane van Gisbergen	Triple Eight Race Engineering	Holden ZB Commodore
2023	Boost Mobile Gold Coast 500	1	(Australia) Cam Waters	Tickford Racing	Ford Mustang GT
2023	Boost Mobile Gold Coast 500	2	(Australia) David Reynolds	Grove Racing	Ford Mustang GT
2024	Boost Mobile Gold Coast 500	1	(Australia) Cam Waters	Tickford Racing	Ford Mustang GT
2024	Boost Mobile Gold Coast 500	2	(Australia) Brodie Kostecki	Erebus Motorsport	Chevrolet Camaro ZL1
2025	Boost Mobile Gold Coast 500	1	(Australia) Chaz Mostert	Walkinshaw Andretti United	Ford Mustang GT
2025	Boost Mobile Gold Coast 500	2	(Australia) Chaz Mostert	Walkinshaw Andretti United	Ford Mustang GT
2026	Boost Mobile Gold Coast 500	1	(Australia) Chaz Mostert	Walkinshaw TWG Racing	GR Supra
2026	Boost Mobile Gold Coast 500	2	(Australia) Broc Feeney	Triple Eight Race Engineering	Ford Mustang GT

== Multiple winners ==
=== By driver ===
Race wins	Driver
6	(Australia) Jamie Whincup
6	(New Zealand) Shane van Gisbergen
5	(Australia) Chaz Mostert
2	(Australia) Garth Tander
2	(France) Sébastien Bourdais
2	(Australia) Jonathon Webb
2	(Australia) Paul Dumbrell
2	(Australia) Steve Owen
2	(France) Alexandre Prémat
2	(Australia) Craig Lowndes
2	(Australia) David Reynolds
2	(Australia) Cam Waters

=== By team ===
Race wins	Team
13	Triple Eight Race Engineering
5	Tickford Racing^{1}
4	Walkinshaw Andretti United
2	Tekno Autosports
2	Rod Nash Racing

=== By manufacturer ===
Race wins	Manufacturer
15	Holden
10	Ford
1	Chevrolet

== International Driver (Dan Wheldon Memorial) Trophy ==
For the years that international co-drivers were mandated for the event, the International Driver Trophy was awarded to the best performing international driver over the race weekend. In 2011, the trophy was renamed after the British IndyCar and Indianapolis 500 champion Dan Wheldon after his death one week prior to the race. The trophy was discontinued after 2012 as a change in regulations saw that international co-drivers were no longer compulsory.

Year	Driver	Team
International Driver Trophy
2010	(United Kingdom) Andy Priaulx	Triple Eight Race Engineering
Dan Wheldon Memorial Trophy
2011	(France) Sébastien Bourdais	Triple Eight Race Engineering
2012	(France) Sébastien Bourdais	Triple Eight Race Engineering

== Superfest ==
The Gold Coast 500 Superfest consists of a range of off-track events, aimed at increasing local awareness and enthusiasm in the days leading up to the main event. These events can vary from year to year, however commonly include drivers signings, transporter parade, King of Burleigh Hill Billy Cart Race, Fast & Ludicrous wheelie bin racing & concerts.

Following the COVID-19 pandemic the Gold Coast 500 Superfest has been significantly scaled back, with the number of events scheduled either on hiatus or permanently cancelled.

== Event sponsors ==
- 2010–13: Armor All Gold Coast 600
- 2014: Castrol Edge Gold Coast 600
- 2015–16: Castrol Gold Coast 600
- 2017–19: Vodafone Gold Coast 600
- 2022–present: Boost Mobile Gold Coast 500

== See also ==
- Gold Coast Indy 300
- V8 Supercar Challenge
- Surfers Paradise International Raceway
- List of Australian Touring Car Championship races
