= 1999 Bob Jane T-Marts Super Touring 500 =

Motor race

Seasons
- ← 1998 none →

Layout of the Mount Panorama Circuit

The 1999 Bob Jane T-Marts Super Touring 500 was a motor race staged at the Mount Panorama Circuit, Bathurst, New South Wales, Australia on 3 October 1999. It was the 37th and last in a sequence of annual touring car endurance races to be organized by the Australian Racing Driver's Club at the Mount Panorama Circuit, previous events having included Bathurst 500 races and, from 1973, the Bathurst 1000.

The race was open to Super Touring cars, with FIA Production cars, GT Production cars and Schedule S cars also invited to compete. Qualifying established the grid for a 100 kilometer preliminary race, the Bob Jane T-Marts Super Touring 100, which in turn determined grid positions for the 500 kilometer main event.

The Super Touring 500 was won by Paul Morris driving a BMW 320i.

== Race ==
The race was very heavily weather affected with rain wreathing the circuit for much of the day, earlier blighting the Bob Jane T-Marts V8 300 race held for a combined field of AUSCARs and Future Touring Cars. The race spent many laps behind a safety car because of heavy rain and poor visibility caused by fog across the top of the Mountain, including the final 17 laps and was eventually declared after 50 laps, 31 short of the intended full race distance. Paul Morris avenged his disqualification from victory in the 1997 AMP Bathurst 1000 taking victory over the two-car factory supported Volvo team, Jim Richards driving solo as Cameron McLean was unable to take his scheduled middle stint because of the weather and because of tyre issues, and Craig Baird and Matthew Coleman. Fourth place and leading independent driver was young New Zealander Mark Porter who had impressed team owner Mike Downard that he kept Porter in the car rather than take his own turn at the wheel. Leading independent team Knight Racing saw the Dean Canto / Leanne Ferrier buried in a sand trap at The Chase while the lead car of Peter Hills / Ron Searle struggled with water leaks and electrical issues.

== Official results ==
=== Bob Jane T-Marts Super Touring 100 ===
Pos	No	Team	Drivers	Car	Laps	Qual Pos
1	3	Volvo Dealer Racing	(New Zealand) Jim Richards	Volvo S40	16	1
2	1	Paul Morris Motorsport	(Australia) Paul Morris	BMW 320i	16	2
3	4	Volvo Dealer Racing	(New Zealand) Craig Baird	Volvo S40	16	3
4	88	Knight Racing	(Australia) Peter Hills	Ford Mondeo	16	5
5	44	Knight Racing	(Australia) Dean Canto	Ford Mondeo	16	4
6	9	Aaron McGill Motorsport	(Australia) Aaron McGill	Ford Mondeo	15	8
7	10	TC Motorsport	(New Zealand) Tony Newman	Peugeot 406	15	6
8	20	TC Motorsport	(Australia) Anthony Robson	Peugeot 406	15	7
9	95	Phoenix Motorsport	(Australia) Jamie Miller	Toyota Camry	15	10
10	14	MPD Racing	(New Zealand) Mark Porter	BMW 320i	15	12
11	38	Rod Salmon	(Australia) Rod Salmon	Mitsubishi Lancer Evo V	15	13
12	12	Rodney Jones Racing	(United Kingdom) Mike Newton	Vauxhall Cavalier	15	15
13	15	Archerfield Speed Karts	(Australia) Mike Kilpatrick	Porsche 930	15	16
14	22	Brian Bradshaw Race Preparation	(New Zealand) Debbie Chapman	BMW 320i	15	17
DNF	7	Anthony Robson	(Australia) Allan Letcher	BMW 318i	10	14
DNF	24	Bruce Miles	(New Zealand) Bruce Miles	BMW 318i	3	11
DNF	97	Triple P Racing	(Australia) Claude Elias	Hyundai Lantra	2	18
DNF	8	Project Racing	(Australia) Jim Cornish	Nissan Primera	0	9

=== Bob Jane T-Marts Super Touring 500 ===
Pos	No	Team	Drivers	Car	Laps	B100 Pos	Qual Pos
1	1	Paul Morris Motorsport	(Australia) Paul Morris	BMW 320i	50	2	2
2	3	Volvo Dealer Racing	(New Zealand) Jim Richards (Australia) Cameron McLean	Volvo S40	50	1	1
3	4	Volvo Dealer Racing	(New Zealand) Craig Baird (Australia) Matthew Coleman	Volvo S40	50	3	3
4	14	MPD Racing	(New Zealand) Mark Porter (New Zealand) Mike Downard	BMW 320i	49	10	12
5	38	Rod Salmon	(Australia) Rod Salmon (Australia) Damien White	Mitsubishi Lancer Evo V	49	11	13
6	12	Rodney Jones Racing	(United Kingdom) Mike Newton (United Kingdom) Andy Lloyd	Vauxhall Cavalier	49	12	15
7	8	Project Racing	(Australia) Jim Cornish (Australia) Roger Townshend	Nissan Primera	49	DNF	9
8	88	Knight Racing	(Australia) Peter Hills (Australia) Ron Searle	Ford Mondeo	49	4	5
9	95	Phoenix Motorsport	(Australia) Mike Kilpatrick (Australia) Jamie Miller	Toyota Camry	48	9	10
10	22	Brian Bradshaw Race Preparation	(New Zealand) Dennis Chapman (New Zealand) Debbie Chapman	BMW 320i	48	14	17
11	24	Bruce Miles	(New Zealand) Bruce Miles (New Zealand) Murray Cleland	BMW 318i	47	DNF	11
12	7	Grid Motorsport	(Australia) Allan Letcher (Australia) Jenni Thompson	BMW 318i	46	DNF	14
13	9	Aaron McGill Motorsport	(Australia) Aaron McGill (Australia) Gary Quartly	Ford Mondeo	39	6	8
14	77	Motorsport Developments	(Australia) Malcolm Rea (Australia) Dennis Cribbin	Toyota Carina	38	DNS	DNS
DNF	97	Triple P Racing	(Australia) Claude Elias (Australia) Paul Leabeater	Hyundai Lantra	34	DNF	18
DNF	10	TC Motorsport	(New Zealand) Tony Newman (Australia) Mark Zonneveld	Peugeot 406	25	7	6
DNF	44	Knight Racing	(Australia) Dean Canto (Australia) Leanne Ferrier	Ford Mondeo	24	5	4
DNF	30	Roadchill Express	(Australia) Troy Searle (Australia) Luke Searle	BMW 320i	9	DNS	DNS
DNF	99	Motorsport Developments	(Australia) Clayton Haynes (Australia) Carlos Rolfo	Toyota Carina	6	DNS	19
DNS	20	TC Motorsport	(Australia) Anthony Robson (Australia) Mark Zonneveld (New Zealand) Rick Armstrong	Peugeot 406		8	7
DNS	15	Archerfield Speed Karts	(Australia) Mike Kilpatrick	Porsche 930		13	16

Note:

- Italics indicate the driver practiced the car but did not compete in the race.
- The Rod Salmon / Damien White Mitsubishi Lancer Evo V was entered as a GT Production car.

== Statistics ==
- Pole Position – #3 Jim Richards (Determined from results of 100 km race)
- Fastest Lap – #3 Jim Richards – 2:38.1390
- Race time of winning car – 2:55:31.5969
- Average Race Speed – 106 km/h
