= 1999 Bob Jane T-Marts V8 300 =

Layout of the Mount Panorama Circuit

The 1999 Bob Jane T-Marts V8 300 was a one-off touring car endurance race run by the Australian Racing Driver's Club at the Mount Panorama Circuit. It was held on 3 October 1999.

The race was held for a combination of the then new Future Touring Car class and by the former Superspeedway category called AUSCAR. Originally these two classes of cars were to take part in the race that became the 1999 Bob Jane T-Marts 500.

== Class structure ==
The race was held for a grid of Holden Commodores and Ford Falcons complying to one of two categories.

Class A was for AUSCAR stock cars, the Australised lower cost and lower specification interpretation of NASCAR.

Class B was for Bathurst Tourers, known previously as New Millennium AUSCARs and later known as Future Touring Cars. The category was invented to provide a road racing category for the AUSCAR stock cars, which were in decline in their home environment at the Calder Park Thunderdome, to be converted relatively inexpensively into circuit racing touring cars.

== Official results ==
Results as follows:

Pos	Class	No	Team	Drivers	Car	Laps	Qual Pos
1	B	7	Team Brock	(Australia) James Brock	Holden Commodore (VS)	38	3
2	B	10	Jason Wylie Racing	(Australia) Jason Wylie	Holden Commodore (VS)	38	5
3	B	84	Australian Petroleum Supplies	(Australia) Ray Sidebottom (Australia) Andrew McInnes	Holden Commodore (VS)	38	4
4	A	4	Revell Model Kits	(Australia) Graham Crawford (Australia) Ken James	Holden Commodore (VS)	38	11
5	B	2	Pretty Motorsport	(Australia) Nathan Pretty (Australia) Nicole Pretty	Holden Commodore (VS)	38	9
6	A	44	Powermac Racing Products	(Australia) Darren McDonald (Australia) Peter Fitzgerald	Holden Commodore (VS)	38	1
7	B	6	SVO Motorsport	(New Zealand) Paul Pedersen (New Zealand) Miles Worsley	Ford Falcon (EF)	38	7
8	A	31	I & V Truck & Trailer Repairs	(Australia) Daryl Speers (Australia) Gerry Raleigh	Holden Commodore (VS)	37	16
9	A	3	Pretty Motorsport	(New Zealand) Andrew Fawcet (New Zealand) Lewis Scott	Holden Commodore (VS)	37	10
10	A	28	Matthew White Racing	(Australia) Matthew White (Australia) Rodney Jane	Holden Commodore (VS)	37	6
11	A	18	Snowy Mountains Milk Company	(Australia) Amin Chahda (Australia) Mark Sutherland	Ford Falcon (EF)	37	20
12	A	5	John Agosta	(Australia) John Agosta (Australia) Eddie Woods	Holden Commodore (VP)	37	14
13	A	38	Wayne Smith Racing	(Australia) Wayne Smith (Australia) Mark Telfer	Holden Commodore (VS)	36	17
14	A	96	Keech Castings	(Australia) Shane Houlahan (Australia) Greg East	Holden Commodore (VS)	36	8
15	A	15	HPC Constructions	(Australia) Hector Gutierrez	Holden Commodore (VS)	35	22
16	A	09	B & A Automotive	(Australia) Andrew Gillespie (Australia) Con Vereker	Ford Falcon (EL)	35	12
17	A	11	Ross Racing	(Australia) Leanne Ross	Ford Falcon (EL)	30	18
DNF	B	85	Bendix Mintex Ultimate Brake Pads	(Australia) Tim D'Ombrain (Australia) Graeme Gilliland	Holden Commodore (VR)	33	15
DNF	B	8	Bruce Williams Motorsport	(Australia) Terry Wyhoon (Australia) Marshall Brewer	Holden Commodore (VS)	28	2
DNF	B	13	Goanna Racing Team	(Australia) Christian D'Agostin	Ford Falcon (EL)	27	23
DNF	A	22	Diamond Valley Speed Shop	(Australia) Leigh Yarnall (Australia) Tony Edwards	Holden Commodore (VS)	14	21
DNF	A	04	Barreau Hotel Group	(Australia) Nigel Benson (Australia) Rod Wilson	Holden Commodore (VS)	3	19
DNF	B	12	Bruce Williams Motorsport	(Australia) Dean Wanless (Australia) Todd Wanless	Holden Commodore (VS)	3	13

== Statistics ==
- Pole Position - #44 Peter Fitzgerald - 2:28.0188
- Fastest Lap - #44 Peter Fitzgerald - 2:55.1241
- Average Speed - 105 km/h
