= Aaron Caratti =

Australian racing driver

- Nationality: Australian
- Born: 23 May 1980 (age 46) Perth, Western Australia
- Relatives: Nathan Caratti (brother)

Australian Mini Challenge
- Years active: 2009
- Starts: 5
- Wins: 0
- Best finish: 13th in 2009 Australian Mini Challenge

Previous series
- 2003-05 2004 2005 2006-08 2009: Formula 3 Australia; Formula Ford WA; Formula Renault Asia; Carrera Cup Aust. Super GT

Championship titles
- 2005: Australian Drivers' Championship

Aaron Grant Caratti (born 23 May 1980 in Perth, Western Australia) is an Australian racing driver. He progressed from karting to the Australian Formula Ford Championship before graduating to the Australian Formula 3 series where he became champion in 2005. Since then, he has competed with moderate success in sports cars.

== Career results ==
Season	Series	Position	Car	Team
2003	Australian Formula 3 Championship	14th	Dallara F301 Sodemo Renault	Race Torque
2004	Australian Formula 3 Championship	5th	Dallara F301 Sodemo Renault	Race Torque
2004	Australian Formula Ford Championship	23rd	Stealth Van Diemen RF92 Ford	Fastlane Racing
2004	Western Australian Formula Ford Championship	8th	Stealth Van Diemen RF92 Ford	Fastlane Racing
2004	Asian Formula Three Championship	14th		
2005	Australian Drivers' Championship	1st	Dallara F304 Sodemo Renault	Astuti Competition insight F3
2006	Australian Carrera Cup Championship	12th	Porsche 997 GT3 Cup	Paul Cruickshank Racing
2007	Australian Carrera Cup Championship	9th	Porsche 997 GT3 Cup	Paul Cruickshank Racing
2008	Australian Carrera Cup Championship	6th	Porsche 997 GT3 Cup	Paul Cruickshank Racing
2009	Australian Mini Challenge	13th	Mini Cooper S JCW R56	Glory Team Racing

Sporting positions
Preceded by Neil McFadyen	Winner of the Australian Drivers' Championship; 2005	Succeeded by Ben Clucas
