= Gold Coast Indy 300 =

Motorsport race in Queensland, Australia, 1991–2008

Coordinates: 27°59′17.9″S 153°25′42.1″E

- Surfers Paradise Street Circuit

Race information
- Most wins (drivers): (France) Sébastien Bourdais (2)
- Most wins (constructors): Newman/Haas/Lanigan Racing (6)
- Circuit length: 4.47 km (2.79 miles)
- Race length: 269.88 km (167.70 miles)
- Laps: 60

Last race (2008)

Pole position
- (Australia) Will Power; KV Racing Technology; 1:34.9451

Podium
- 1. (Australia) R. Briscoe; Team Penske; 1:45:50.3868; 2. (New Zealand) S. Dixon; Target Chip Ganassi Racing; +0.5019s; 3. (United States) R. Hunter-Reay; Rahal Letterman Racing; +9.1179s

Fastest lap
- (United Kingdom) D. Franchitti; Target Chip Ganassi Racing; 1:35.1552

The Gold Coast Indy 300 was an annual open-wheel motor race event that took place at the Surfers Paradise Street Circuit on the Gold Coast, Queensland, Australia from 1991 to 2008. The challenging 4.47-kilometre (2.78 mi) track, alongside a strip of beaches, had several fast sections and four chicanes. The event had various names during its history for sponsorship reasons; in its final year, it was known as the Nikon Indy 300.

The race debuted in 1991 on the CART Indy Car World Series calendar, the first race in series history held outside North America. Following the split between CART and the newly formed Indy Racing League (IRL) in 1996, CART continued to sanction the event until it folded after the 2003 season. From 2004 to 2007, the race was part of the Champ Car World Series, the successor to CART. Following the merger of the Indy Racing League and Champ Car World Series in February 2008 it was announced that the race would continue as a non-championship IndyCar Series event; however the race was omitted from the 2009 IndyCar Series season calendar, and subsequently dropped by the IndyCar Series completely.

In 2009 as part of the Q150 celebrations, the Gold Coast Indy 300 was announced as one of the Q150 Icons of Queensland for its role as an "event and festival".

== History ==
=== Early years ===
2006 Lexmark Indy 300

2006 Lexmark Indy 300. Miss Indy and Runners-up being interviewed in the pits.

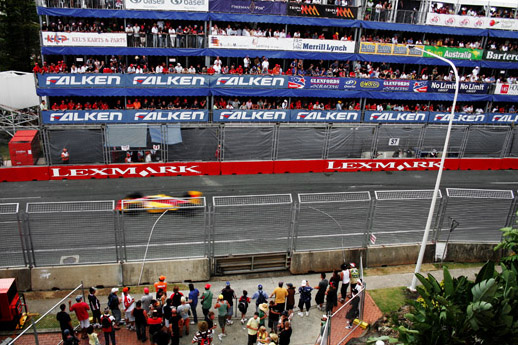
2006 Lexmark Indy 300

The event arrived in Australia on the back of lobbying from a consortium of businessmen from the state of Queensland. The event's early years were dogged by controversy as Australia's motor sport governing body, the Confederation of Australian Motor Sport (CAMS), initially refused to sanction the event due to threats from the FIA to pull the Australian Formula One Grand Prix from championship status, as they believed that the Australian Indy Car Grand Prix on the Gold Coast went against their copyrights / trademarks. The Queensland State Government had been largely supportive of the event, whereas support at local level from the Gold Coast City Council varied, and was occasionally openly hostile to the event.

From 1991 to 1997, the Gold Coast Grand Prix was typically held in March, and several times served as the CART season opener. In 1996, the Australian Grand Prix (Melbourne) moved from the fall to the spring. It created an undesirable scheduling conflict which eventually saw the Gold Coast Indy move permanently to October, starting in 1998. By the late 1990s, as political tensions subsided, the race become a well-attended and popular event on the Gold Coast calendar with tens of thousands of spectators attending each of the four days of the event.

The 1993 race was particularly notable as 1992 Formula One champion Nigel Mansell's first race in American championship car racing, which he won in front of a large number of travelling British fans and media. It was also the first of a record seven race wins at the event for Newman/Haas Racing. In the 2002 event there was a frightening incident when a nine-car pile-up occurred at the start in very wet conditions, however no significant injuries were sustained. In 2003 a massive thunderstorm struck the area during the race, leading to a red flag and shortened race distance.

Due to the main event having two years of bad weather, organisers changed the starting time to avoid the typical Queensland summer storms. This change was seen by some as not needed as the next 3 events were run in bright sunshine. From 2005, the final event of the weekend would be the V8 Supercars final race.

=== Decline ===
The event lost some of its lustre from 2004, as the split between American open wheel racing series started to draw teams from the Champ Car World Series across to the IRL IndyCar Series, whose calendar was considerably more domestic than the well-travelled Champ Car World Series. The falling popularity of open wheel racing in America further devalued the event, with NASCAR dominating the U.S. racing scene. The waning interest led to the V8 Supercars (the leading touring cars category in Australia and a support category since 1994) move from a non-championship to championship event in 2002 and take equal top billing with Champ Car, an unprecedented move across the Champ Car calendar.

In the first sixteen years of the event, there were sixteen different winners. In 2007 Sébastien Bourdais became the first driver to win the race twice, adding to his 2005 victory.

=== Merger ===
On 5 March 2008, it was announced that the IndyCar Series would travel to Australia for the first time, but due to contractual issues the race would not count towards the 2008 championship and would be a stand-alone demonstration event, in light of the recent merger between Champ Car and the IRL. Australian driver Ryan Briscoe nonetheless became the first local winner of the event, in what remains the final running of the event to date.

== Demise and A1GP ==
On 11 November 2008, after extensive negotiations with the IndyCar Series broke down, the Queensland Government reached a new five-year deal with A1 Grand Prix to stage a race at Surfers Paradise, severing its eighteen-year history with American open wheel racing. On 25 February 2009 it was announced that the event, which would combine one of the first few rounds of the 2009–10 A1 Grand Prix season and the 11th round of the 2009 V8 Supercar Championship Series, would be produced through a partnership between IMG and the Queensland Government. The event was also renamed as the SuperGP for 2009, with the iconic Indy name becoming obsolete.

However, on 17 October 2009, A1GP Chairman Tony Teixeira announced that the United Kingdom operating arm of the series went into liquidation in June, with access to the A1GP cars and their ability to pay its suppliers having been impeded. That prevented the cars from leaving Europe in time to be on track in Surfers Paradise on 22 October. Therefore, A1GP withdrew from participation in the 2009 Nikon SuperGP, with V8 Supercars instead running additional races. A1GP refunded Gold Coast Motor Events Co. the sanction fee paid, and donated A$50,000 to a charity designated by the board.

Following A1GP's withdrawal, V8 Supercars became the permanent and sole lead category of the event, which became known as the Gold Coast 600 as of 2010. This event continues to the current day, albeit on a shorter 2.96 km version of the original Surfers Paradise circuit. The original longer circuit has also now been rendered unusable by the G:link light rail network, which now extends along Surfers Paradise Boulevard beyond the existing second chicane.

== Future ==
In June 2016 the Gold Coast Bulletin reported that "secret government talks" were underway to bring back the IndyCar race for 2017 or 2018, and that an area consortium had been given rights to negotiate with IndyCar for an Australian race with a preference for the Gold Coast. IndyCar management would not comment other than to say they were investigating potential overseas venues. With Supercars later signing an extension of their exclusive deal for the event from 2017 to 2019, combined with the prohibitive shorter track layout, and costs of bringing the series to Australia, there are several barriers preventing the revival of the event.

== Past winners ==
Events which were not championship rounds are indicated by a pink background.

Season	Date	Driver	Team	Chassis	Engine	Race Distance		Race Time	Average Speed (mph)	Report	Ref
Season	Date	Driver	Team	Chassis	Engine	Laps	Miles (km)	Race Time	Average Speed (mph)	Report	Ref
CART history
1991	17 March	(United States) John Andretti	Hall/VDS Racing	Lola	Chevrolet	65	181.545 (292.168)	2:12:54	81.953	Report	
1992	22 March	(Brazil) Emerson Fittipaldi	Penske Racing	Penske	Chevrolet	65	181.675 (292.377)	2:20:33	77.561	Report	
1993	21 March	(United Kingdom) Nigel Mansell	Newman/Haas Racing	Lola	Ford	65	181.675 (292.377)	1:52:02	97.284	Report	
1994	20 March	(United States) Michael Andretti	Chip Ganassi Racing	Reynard	Ford	55^{1}	153.725 (247.396)	1:44:58	80.994	Report	
1995	19 March	(Canada) Paul Tracy	Newman/Haas Racing	Lola	Ford	65	182.26 (293.319)	1:58:26	92.335	Report	
1996	31 March	(United States) Jimmy Vasser	Chip Ganassi Racing	Reynard	Honda	65	181.61 (292.272)	2:00:46	90.218	Report	
1997	6 April	(United States) Scott Pruett	Patrick Racing	Reynard	Ford	57^{2}	159.315 (256.392)	2:01:04	78.948	Report	
1998	18 October	(Italy) Alex Zanardi	Chip Ganassi Racing	Reynard	Honda	62^{2}	173.29 (278.883)	2:01:51	85.328	Report	
1999	17 October	(United Kingdom) Dario Franchitti	Team Green	Reynard	Honda	65	181.675 (292.377)	1:58:40	91.849	Report	
2000	15 October	(Mexico) Adrian Fernandez	Patrick Racing	Reynard	Ford	59^{2}	164.905 (265.388)	2:01:14	81.607	Report	
2001	28 October	(Brazil) Cristiano da Matta	Newman/Haas Racing	Lola	Toyota	65	181.675 (292.377)	1:51:47	97.511	Report	
2002	27 October	(Mexico) Mario Domínguez	Herdez Competition	Lola	Ford	40^{3}	111.8 (179.924)	2:00:06	55.849	Report	
2003	26 October	(United States) Ryan Hunter-Reay	American Spirit Team Johansson	Reynard	Ford	47^{4}	131.365 (211.411)	1:49:02	72.28	Report	
2004	24 October	(Brazil) Bruno Junqueira	Newman/Haas Racing	Lola	Ford	57	159.315 (256.392)	1:46:45	89.532	Report	
2005	23 October	(France) Sébastien Bourdais	Newman/Haas Racing	Lola	Ford	57	159.315 (256.392)	1:39:26	96.123	Report	
2006	22 October	(France) Nelson Philippe	CTE-HVM Racing	Lola	Ford	59	164.905 (265.388)	1:50:50	89.259	Report	
2007	21 October	(France) Sébastien Bourdais	Newman/Haas/Lanigan Racing	Panoz DP01	Cosworth	61	170.495 (274.385)	1:45:49	96.669	Report	
IndyCar Series history
2008	26 October	(Australia) Ryan Briscoe	Penske Racing	Dallara	Honda	60	167.7 (269.886)	1:45:50	95.068	Report	

Notes:
^1 – 1994: Race shortened due to darkness / sunset.
^2 – 1997, 1998 and 2000: Race shortened due to time limit.
^3 – 2002: Race shortened due to torrential rain. Only around 8 laps were completed in green flag conditions, the rest of the race was run behind the safety car.
^4 – 2003: Race shortened from 65 laps due to hail storm.

== Support races ==
=== Indy 300 F3 Challenge ===
The Nikon Indy 300 F3 Challenge was a Formula Three race held in 2008 on the streets of Surfers Paradise, Queensland as a non-championship support race of the 2008 IndyCar Series Gold Coast Indy 300 event.

==== Class structure ====
Drivers competed in three classes:

- Championship Class – restricted to cars constructed in accordance with the FIA Formula 3 regulations that applied between 1 January 1999 and 31 December 2007
- National Class – restricted to cars constructed in accordance with the FIA Formula 3 regulations that applied between 1 January 1999 and 31 December 2004
- Trophy Class – restricted to cars constructed in accordance with the FIA Formula 3 regulations that applied between 1 January 1995 and 31 December 2001

=== AUSCAR / Superkarts / Celebrity Challenge ===
Ran from 1991 - 1993.

=== V8 Supercars ===
Ran from 1994 -1996 (ATCC) and then 1997 - 2008 (V8 Supercars) - having Championship status from 2002 - 2008.

From the 2004 event, the orgnaisers constructed an additional pit-lane and garages for the V8 Supercars. Their pit entry point was closer to the overpass at the final corner and their exit ran through the Champ Car Pit Lane to turn 1. Speed limit was 40kph within their pit lane then they accelerated to ~80kph for the Champ Car section of the pit lane.

=== Super Tourers (2 Litre) ===
Ran from 1994 - 1997.

=== Nations Cup / Production Car ===
Ran from 2000 - 2004.

=== V8 Utes ===
Ran from 2001 - 2008 - ran a race at night in the early 2000's.

== Event names ==
- 1991: Gold Coast IndyCar GP
- 1992: Daikyo IndyCar GP
- 1993–94: Australian FAI IndyCar GP
- 1995: IndyCar Australia
- 1996: Bartercard IndyCar Australia
- 1997: Sunbelt IndyCarnival
- 1998–2002: Honda Indy 300
- 2003–07: Lexmark Indy 300
- 2008: Nikon Indy 300

== See also ==
- 1954 Australian Grand Prix
- V8 Supercar Challenge
- Gold Coast 600
