= Motorsport in New Zealand =

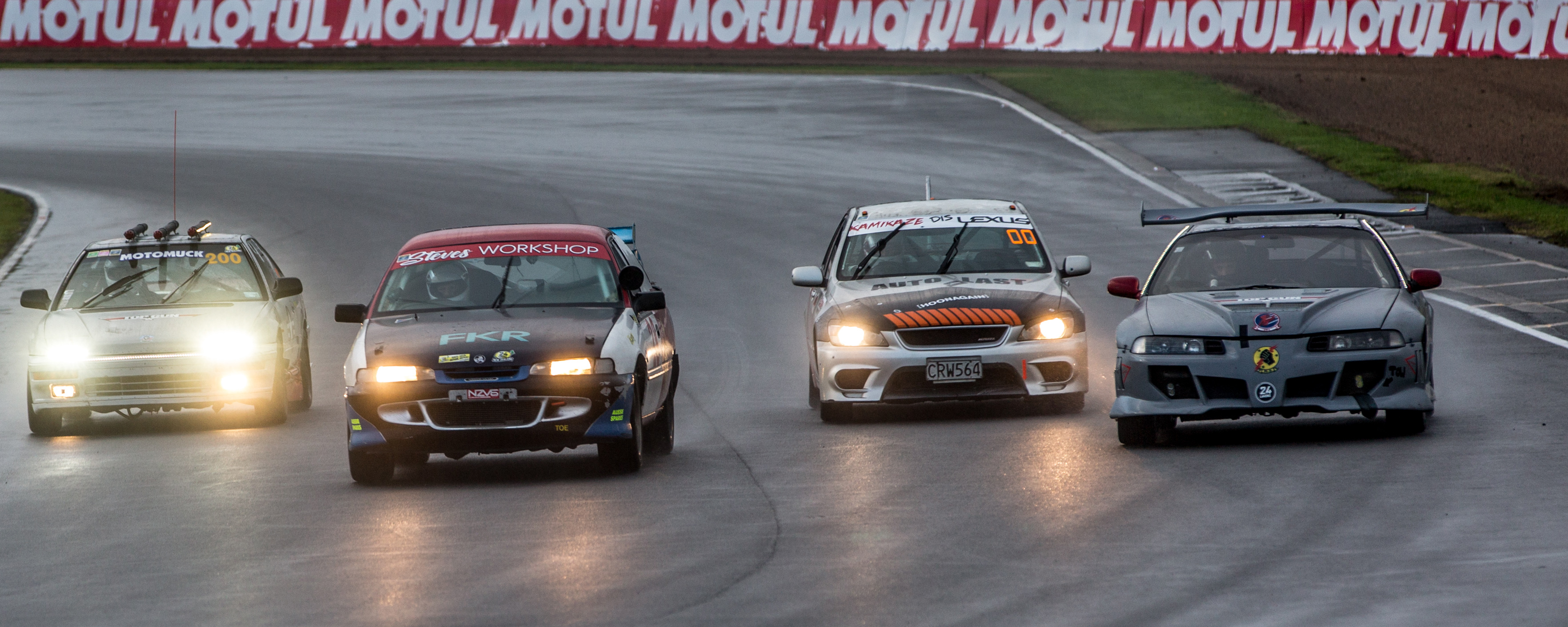
24 Hours of Lemons - NZ's biggest participation motorsport

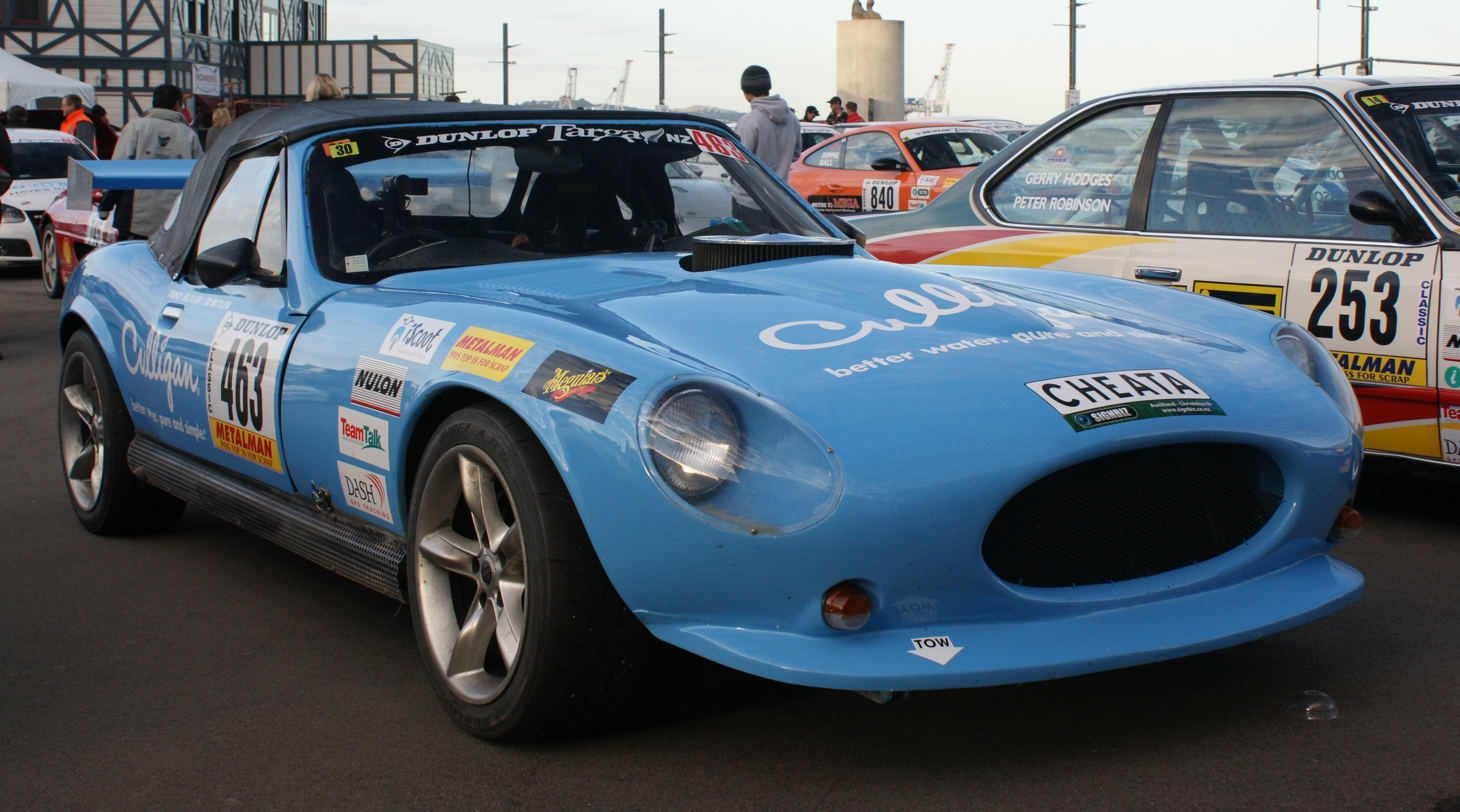
Targa Rally 2009 - Cheetah kit car

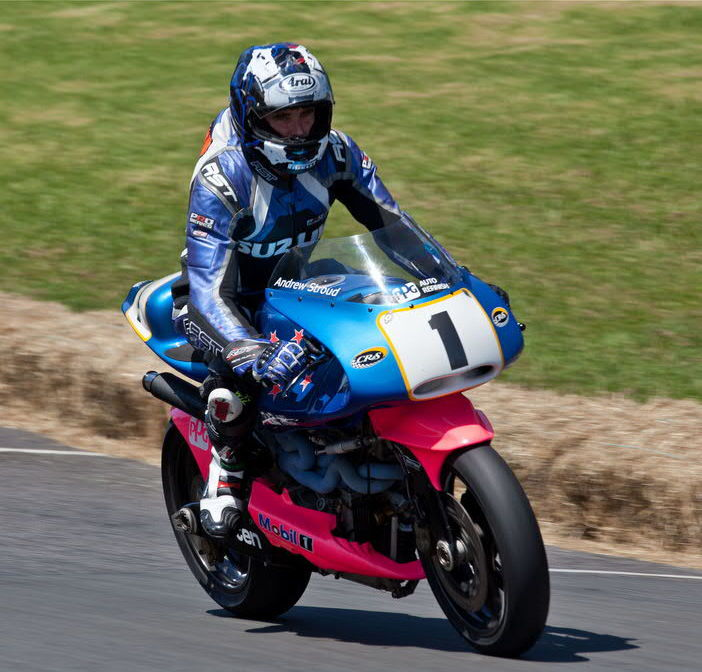
Britten V1000

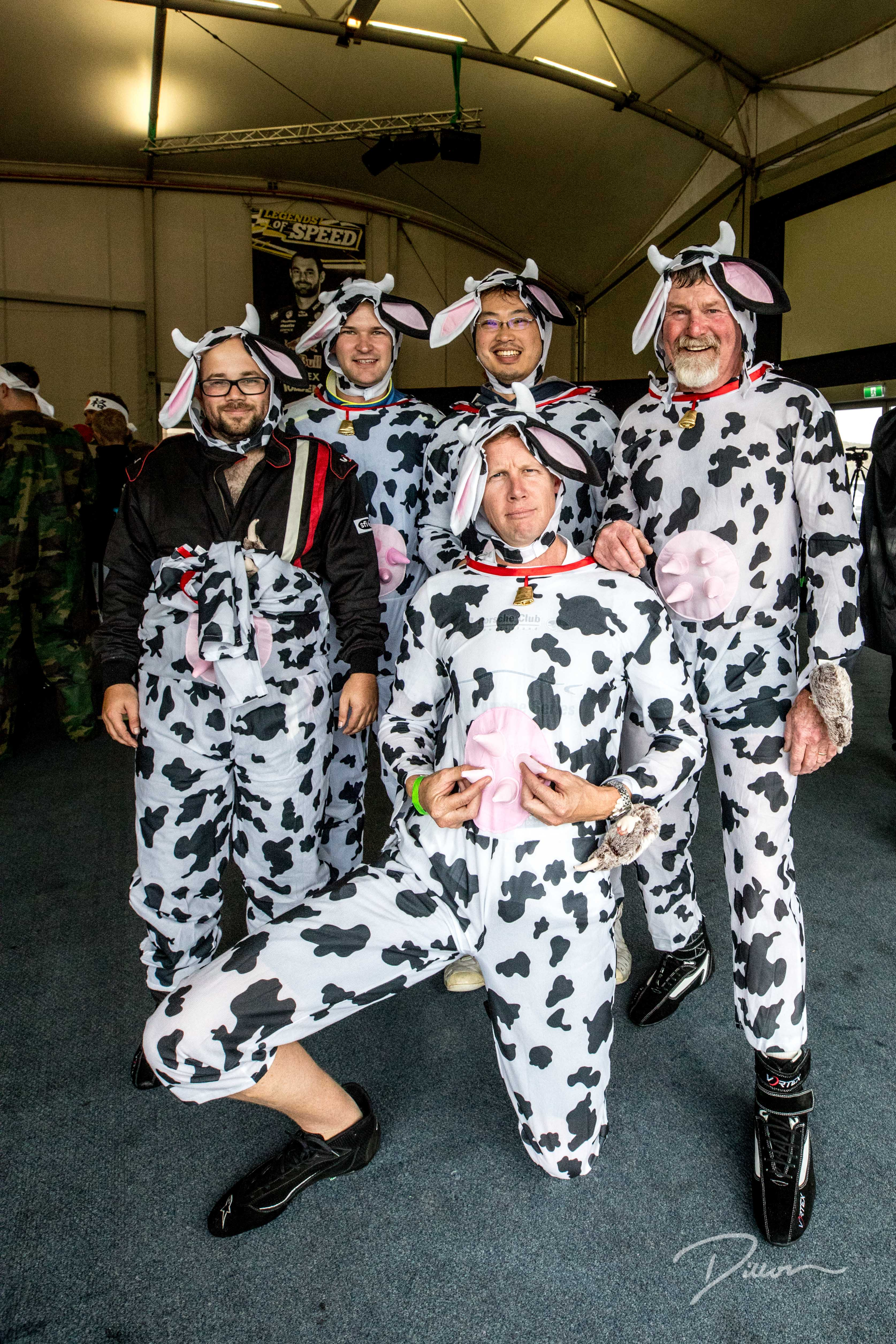
24 Hours of Lemons - whacky themed teams

Motorsports in New Zealand began in 1901 when the Pioneer Cycle Club held a three-mile handicap race which included both motor bikes and cars. Since then it has developed and now almost all types of motor sport events are represented.

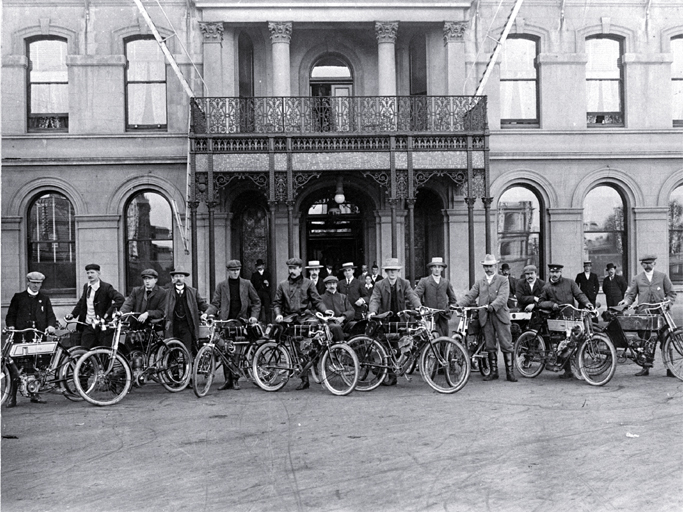
1904 motor cycle reliability run Oxford to the West Coast

== History ==
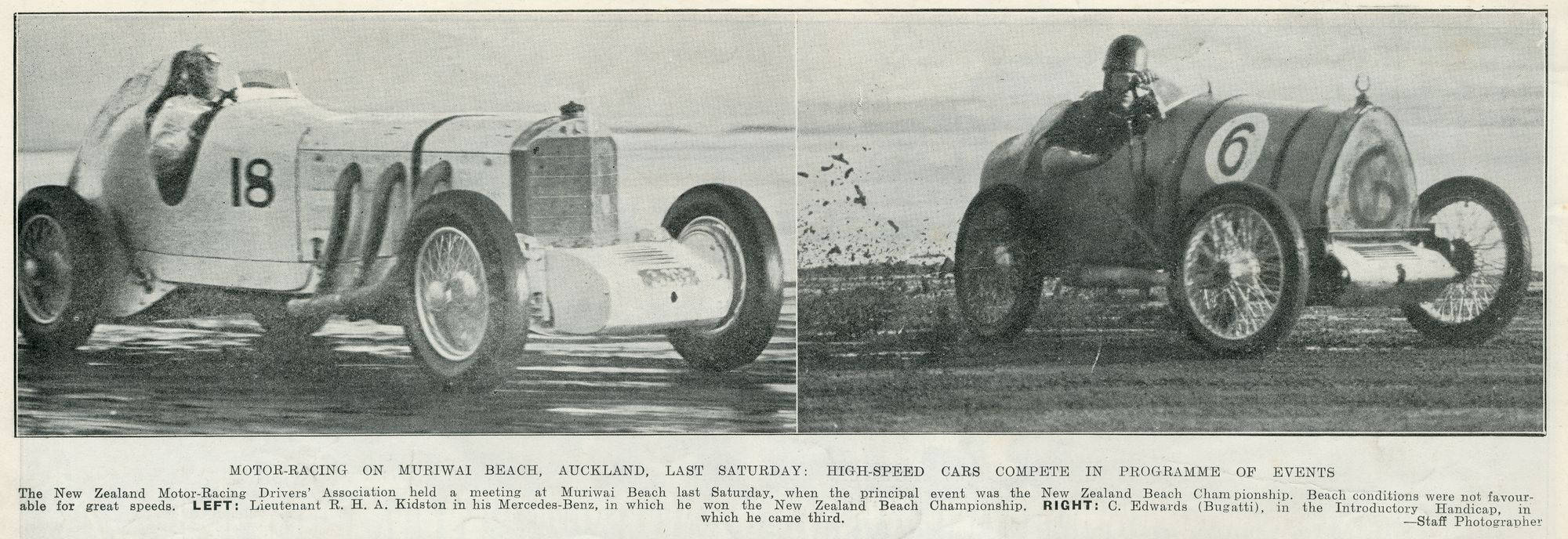
Racing cars at Muriwai Beach in May 1935

Initially motor sport in New Zealand was organised by cycle clubs with both motor bikes and cars taking part in the same events. The earliest recorded motorcar and motorbike race in New Zealand took place in Christchurch. On 8 November 1901 the Pioneer Cycle Club held a 3-mile automobile race at Hagley Park between a Brown motor quad driven by A Lowry, a Minerva engined Stella motor bicycle ridden by A Every, and a Star Motor Company Voiturette driven by Noel Oates. The motor bicycle won the race. Noel Oates was the proprietor of the Zealandia Cycling Works, a successful Christchurch based cycle manufacturer.

By 1903 motor cycles were competing in their own events. In 1905 motor sport events included hill climbs.

The first motor race meeting with multiple events was organized by the Canterbury Automobile Association on 26 December 1905 at the Metropolitan Trotting Grounds (now known as the Addington Raceway). The event included a gymkhana to test driver skills, several 5 mile long motor races for cars based horse power classes, and two motor bicycle races. Dr Thacker's Beeston–Humber driven by A Duncan won the main race for cars under 12 hp.

Reliability trials (now called Economy Runs) also started in this period. These were usually organised by the local Automobile Association. These were followed by motor car and bike races on various beaches.

Motorcycle grass track racing at horse race tracks continued during the war period. As did beach racing at locations such as New Brighton. While these events were predominantly male drivers, there were events specifically for female motor cyclists.

== Motorbike racing ==
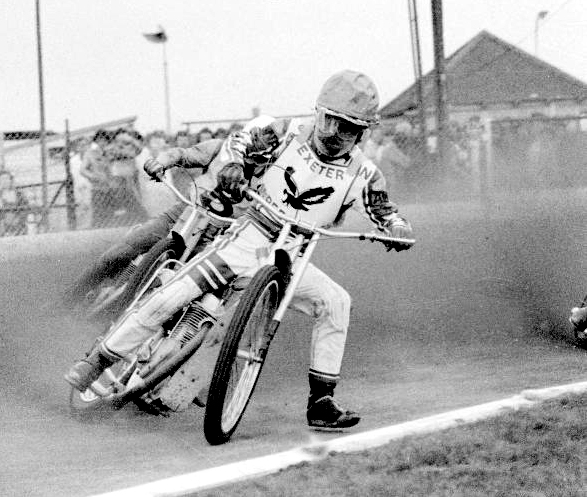
Ivan Mauger

Early motor cycle races took place at various horse race tracks throughout the country. Later races also took place on beaches. An example of these was the 100 mile race at New Brighton organized by the Pioneer Motorcycle Club and held on 13 January 1917. The race was won by Ernest F C Hinds on a 7 hp Harley-Davidson.

The first New Zealand rider on the international scene was Alan Woodman. He raced in the 1910 Isle of Man TT race, crashed, and lost his leg as a result of the incident. Despite this disability Woodman continued to successfully race motor cycles.

Another early New Zealand motorcycle champion was Rod Coleman's father, Percy Coleman. Percy begun racing in 1912 on a 3.5 horsepower Humber at Ashhurst race course. In 1913 riding a Douglas, he won the New Zealand 5 mile light weight championship. By 1914, on an Indian, he was the top New Zealand rider. By 1914 he held the Australasian 1, 5, and 10 mile speed records. In 1915 he switched for a season to the Big X Excelsior, returning to an 8 valve Indian the following. In 1919 he went to the United States and competed in the Ascot 200 at Ascot Park, Los Angeles. He finished 8th on an Indian. He then returned to New Zealand to continue his Australasian racing career. Percy raced unsuccessfully in the 1930 Isle of Man TT race.

By 1917 motor cycle racing had been divided into different classes: light, medium, heavy-weight; open; and ladies. Light weight machines were up to 350 or 600cc if no medium weight class was run. Medium weight was from over 350cc to 600cc, and heavy weight over 600cc. Ladies were restricted to up to 350cc. Sidecar motorcycles were also raced at some events.

=== Track racing ===
- Castrol Six Hour (New Zealand)

=== Speedway ===
- Motorcycle speedway
- New Zealand Solo Championship

=== Hill Climb ===
- Silverstone Race to the Sky

== Car racing ==
=== Track racing ===
==== Open wheelers ====
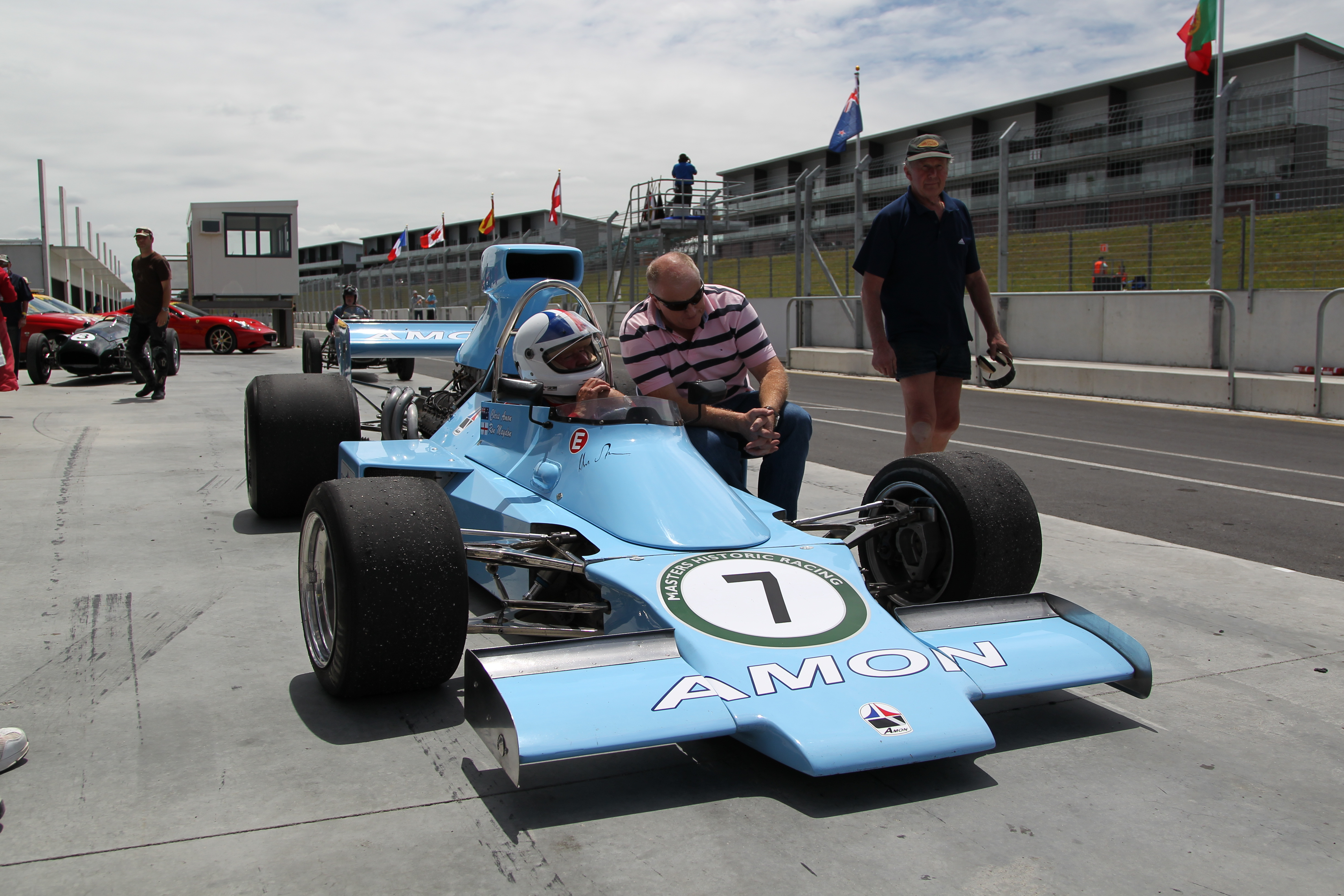
Amon AF101

- Chris Amon Racing - Formula 1 team
- Formula Ford
- Formula Holden
- Formula Mondial
- Formula Pacific - New Zealand staged the first ever races for Formula Pacific cars in January 1977 having abandoned Formula 5000 and moved to the new formula in that year. The category continued there until Formula Mondial was introduced in 1983.
- New Zealand Grand Prix
- Tasman Series
- Formula Regional Oceania Championship by Toyota Gazoo Racing New Zealand

==== Single make ====
- Suzuki Swift Sport Cup
- Toyota Finance 86 Championship
- Mazda Racing Series

==== Production and touring cars ====
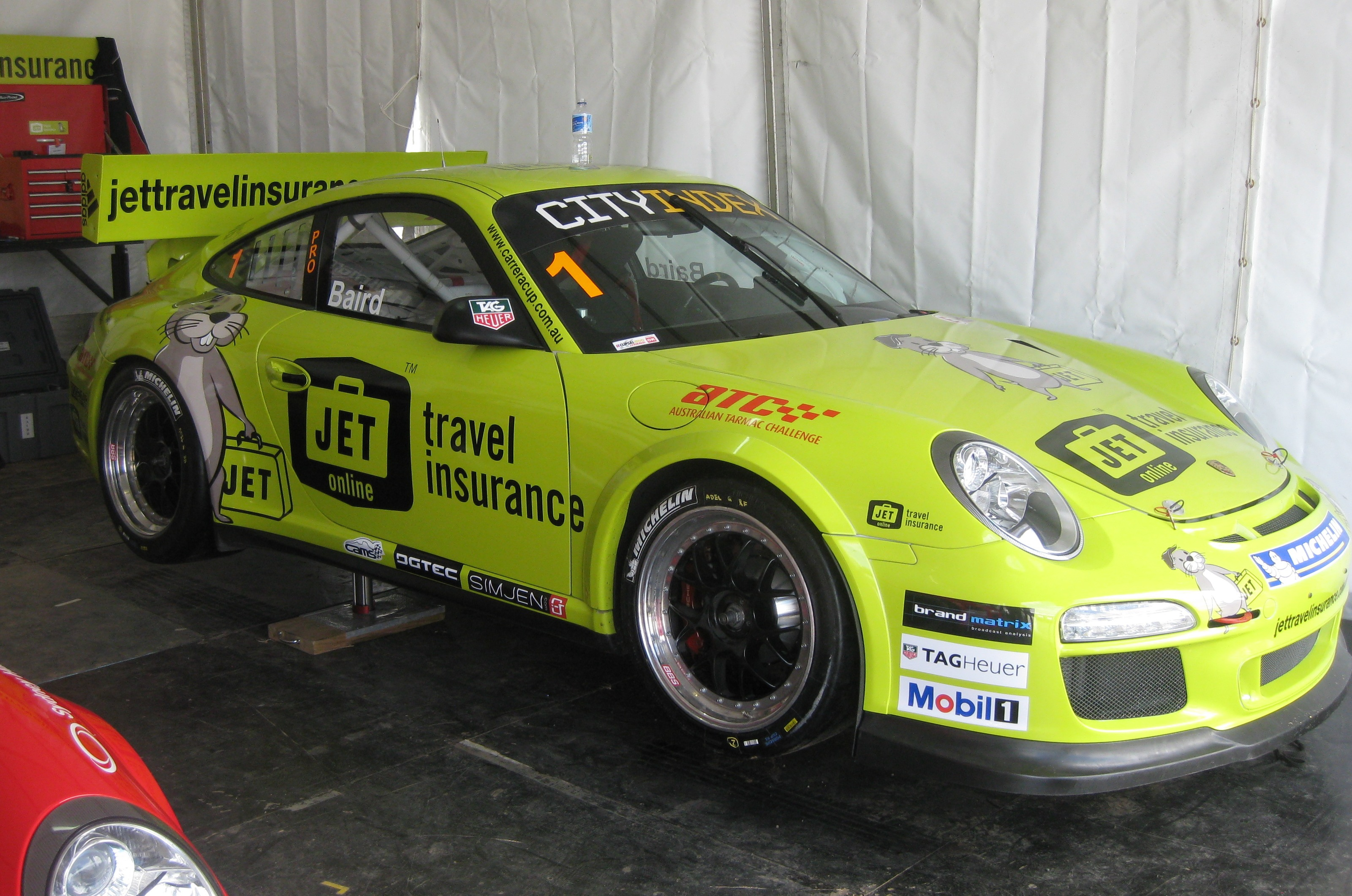
Craig Baird GT3 cup Porsche 997

- Supercars Championship (Auckland SuperSprint and Hamilton 400 - from 2008 to 2012)
- John McIntyre Racing - racing team
- M3 Racing - racing team
- New Zealand Touring Car Championship 1984-2002
- NZ Touring Cars championship V8 touring cars from 2003 to 2011
- Super Black Racing - racing team
- Suzuki Swift Sport Cup
- Tasman Motorsport - racing team
- V8SuperTourer - from 2012 to 2015

=== Endurance ===
National Endurance Championship: A one off 1 day meeting where the top 20 cars from the South Island Endurance & North Island Endurance Series compete for the National Endurance titles in 1 hour and 3 hour races.

- 24 Hours of Lemons - Heralded as New Zealand's largest participation motorsport series, 24 Hours of Lemons ran the first ever continuous endurance race in NZ history in May 2018 at Hampton Downs Motorsport Park.
- Pukekohe 500 - an endurance production and touring car race held since 1963
- Wellington 500 - an endurance touring car race held from 1985 to 1996

=== Drifting ===
- D1NZ

=== Drag racing ===
Drag racing in New Zealand started in the 1960s. The New Zealand Hot Rod Association (NZHRA) sanctioned what is believed to have been the first drag meeting at an open cut coal mine at Kopuku, south of Auckland, sometime in 1966. In 1973, the first and only purpose built drag strip opened in Meremere by the Pukekohe Hot Rod Club. In April 1993 the governance of drag racing was separated from the NZHRA and the New Zealand Drag Racing Association (NZDRA) was formed. In 2014, New Zealand's second purpose built drag strip - Masterton Motorplex - opened.

The first New Zealand Drag Racing Nationals was held in the 1966/67 season at Kopuku, near Auckland.

There are now two governing bodies operating drag racing in New Zealand with the IHRA sanctioning both of New Zealands major tracks at Ruapuna (Pegasus Bay Drag Racing Association) in the South Island and Meremere Dragway Inc in the North Island. NZDRA being the other organisation now run at Masterton Motorplex and Taupo as well as using the Street car old airstrips and closed roads throughout the country. NZDRA NZ is the sanctioned governing body of dragracing in New Zealand.

=== Hill Climb ===
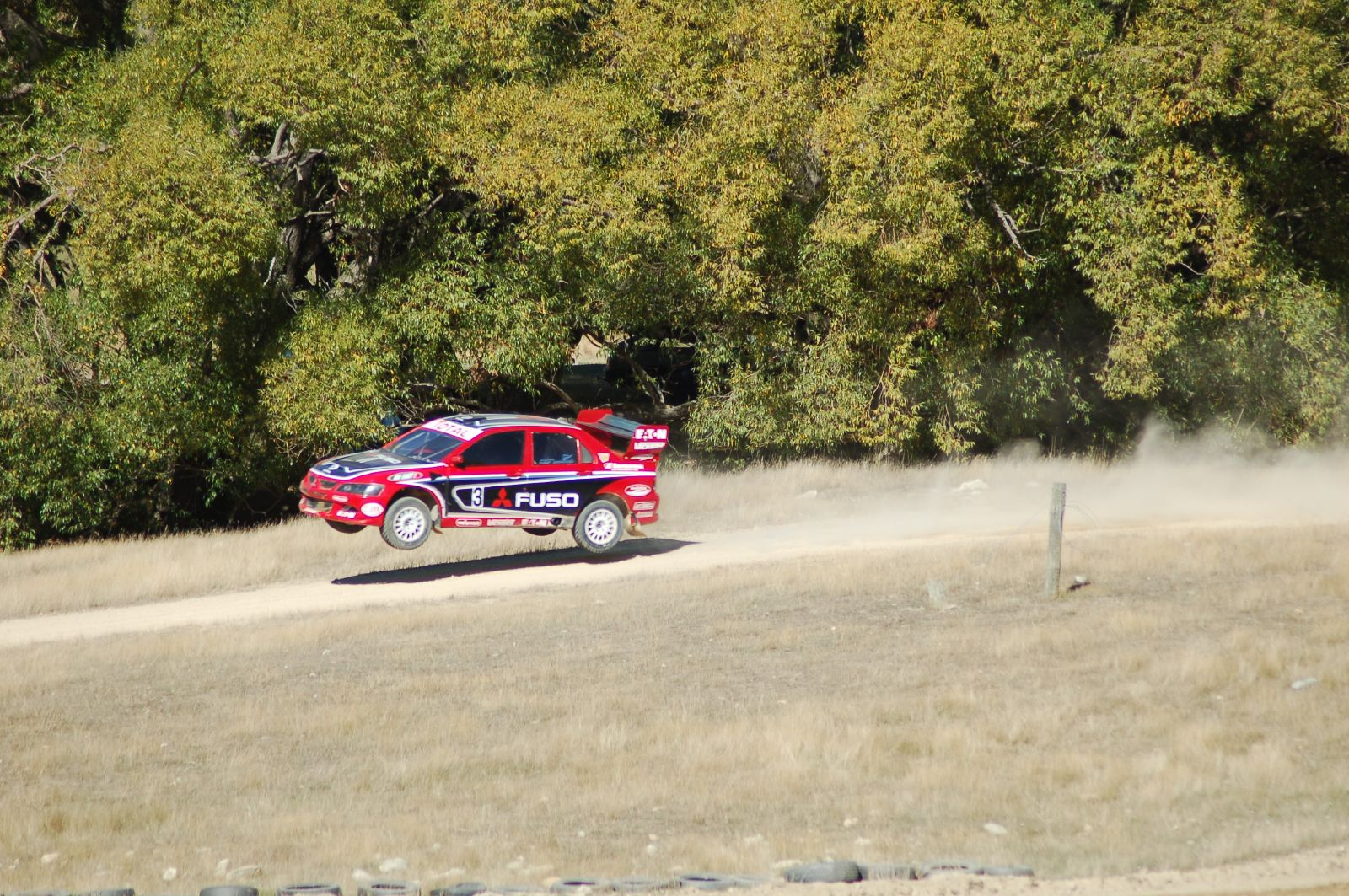
Race to the sky

- Silverstone Race to the Sky

=== Rallying ===
- International Rally of Whangarei
- New Zealand Rally Championship
- Targa New Zealand

=== Speedway (dirt track racing) ===
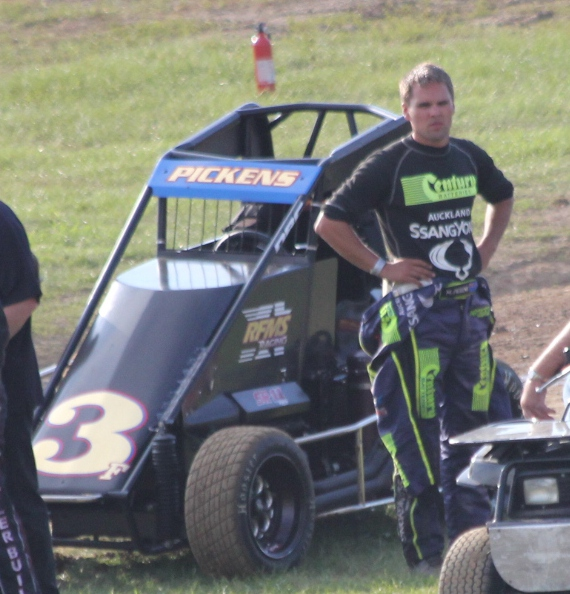
Michael Pickens midget car

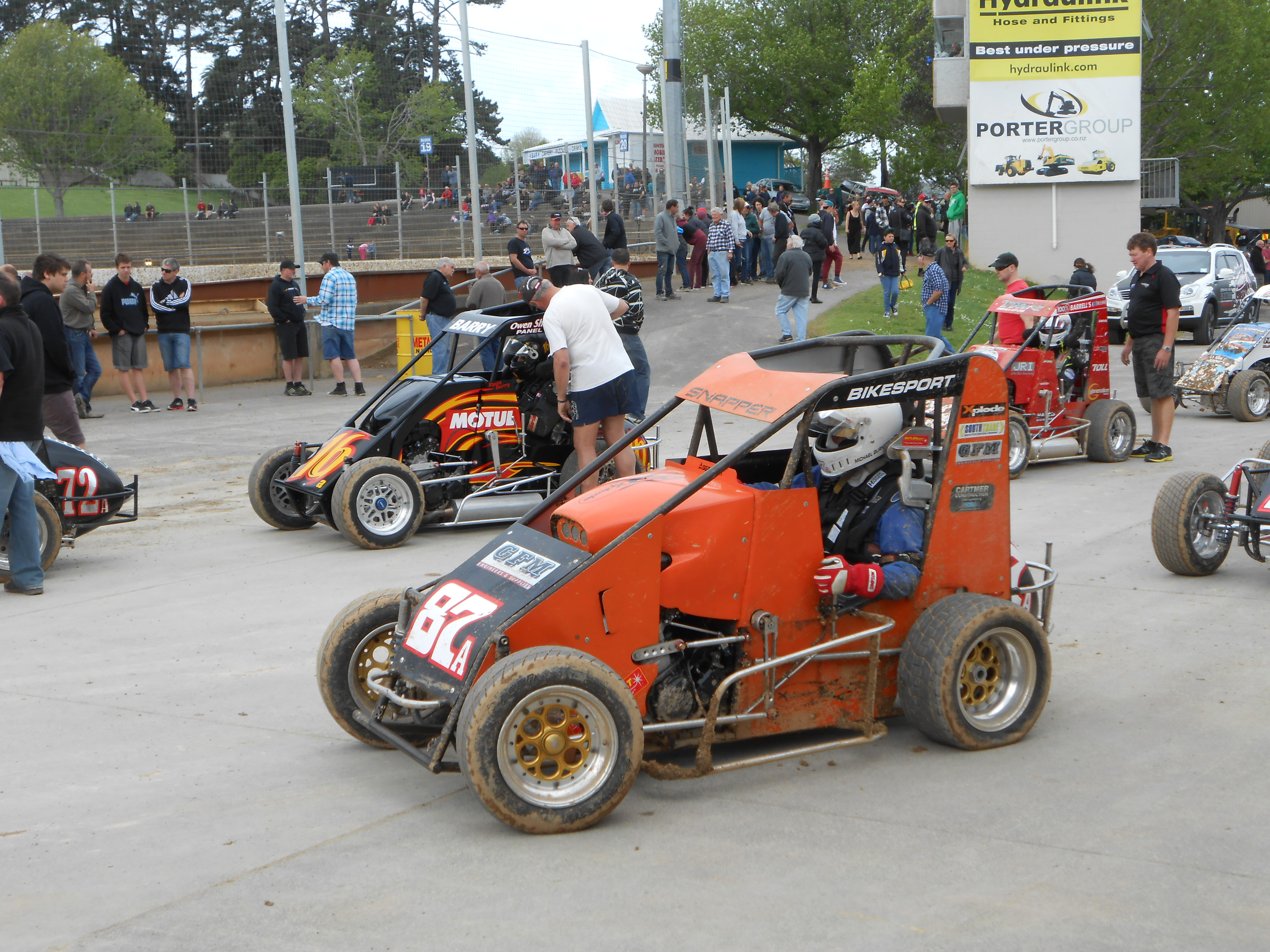
Western Springs in 2013

- Midget car racing
- Speedway Grand Prix of New Zealand

Stockcar racing began in New Zealand during the 1950s, first race was at Aranui Speedway on November 27, 1954. It was brought to New Zealand after New Zealand Speedway riders witnessed the huge crowds that watched the races in Britain earlier that year. As with the UK, Stockcar racing in New Zealand is a very different form of racing than that of the US. Stockcar racing is a full-contact sport in New Zealand: as the rule book states, "contact is not only permitted, it is encouraged". Cars are built to an extremely rigid design and feature strong steel guards around almost the entire car. "Stockcars" are divided into three classes: Superstocks, Stockcars, Ministocks (Ministocks predominantly being a non-contact youth class). Superstocks are the top class and are typically powered by V8 engines up to 248 cubic inch which can produce over 500 bhp. The majority of races are of an individual nature however, unique to New Zealand stockcar racing is the team racing format. Typically teams racing consists of two teams of four cars each that work together to win the race. Teams normally protect their "runners" while attempting to eliminate the opposing team, the races can be decided by a points format or first across the finish line.

The class most resembling the North American form of stockcar racing are known as Saloon cars. Super Saloons are similar to dirt late models, with the main differences being the bodies closer resemble production cars, use iron engines up to 434 cubic inch with no rear offset and run much larger sprintcar tyres on the rear.

=== Off-road racing ===
Off-road racing runs its own class structure and has a multiple-round national championship. Its flagship event, the two-day, 1000 km Taupo 1000, is a stand-alone international endurance race which is currently held every other year. The event started life in 1992, as the "made for television" Bridgestone 1000 and was the first Offroad Endurance Race in New Zealand to include teams from Australia, New Zealand and the US. That event was won outright by Les Siviour of Australia driving a Class 6 Nissan Patrol, for Team Nissan. The most successful and popular racer in the sport's history in New Zealand is multiple outright and class national champion Ian Foster of Henderson, Auckland. At the height of his career he had amassed 21 back to back wins, driving for Team Tamiya in an Unlimited Class 1 race car built by Cougar Race Cars. Ian was one of the co-founders of the sports national organising body, known as ORANZ. The sport is about to enter its 30th year.

=== Historic vehicles ===
- Southern Festival of Speed

== Speed boats ==
Motor boat racing took place as early as 1917. Racing was held in various classes and included handicap races.

== Venues ==
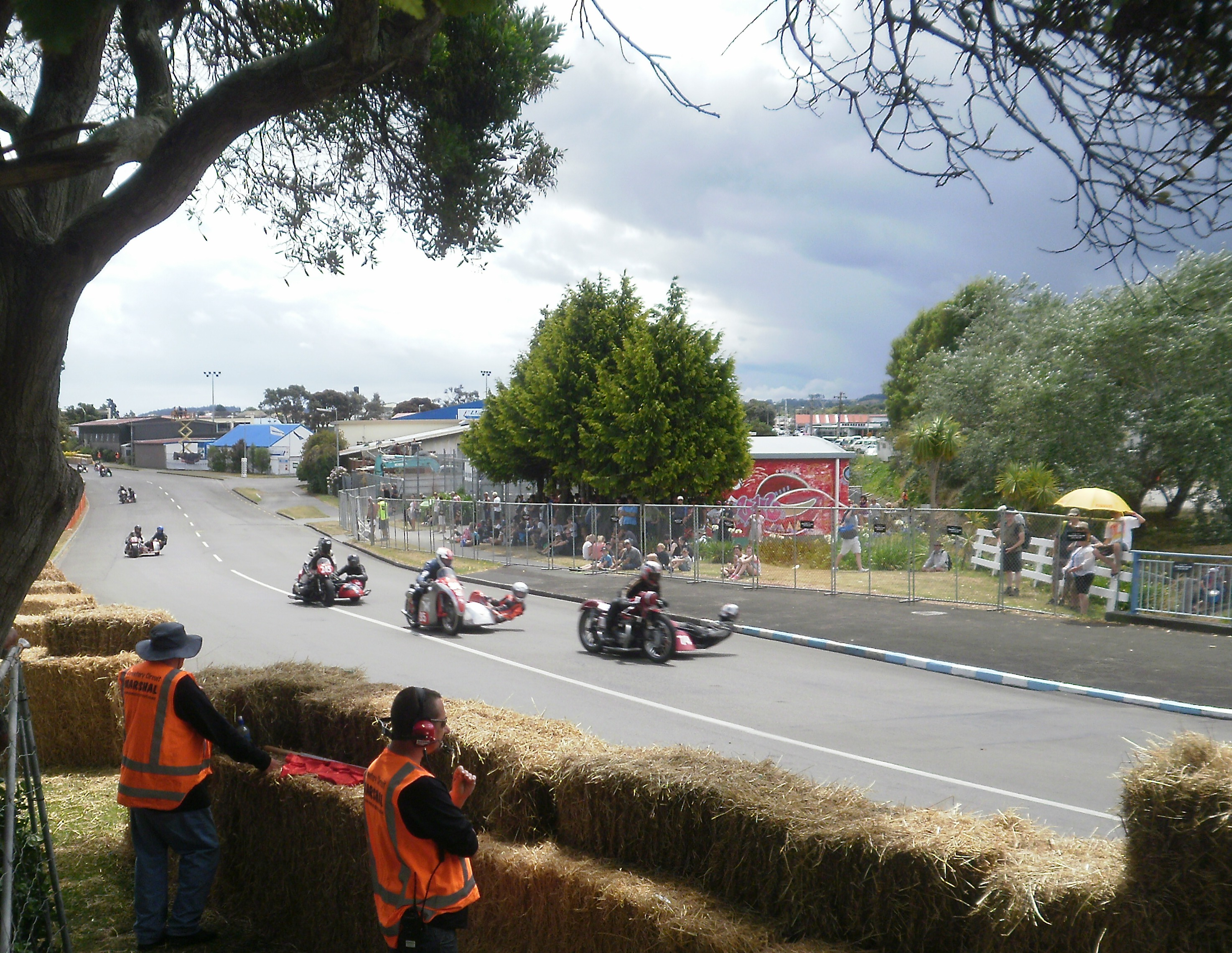
Sidecar racing at the 2012 Cemetery Circuit, Whanganui

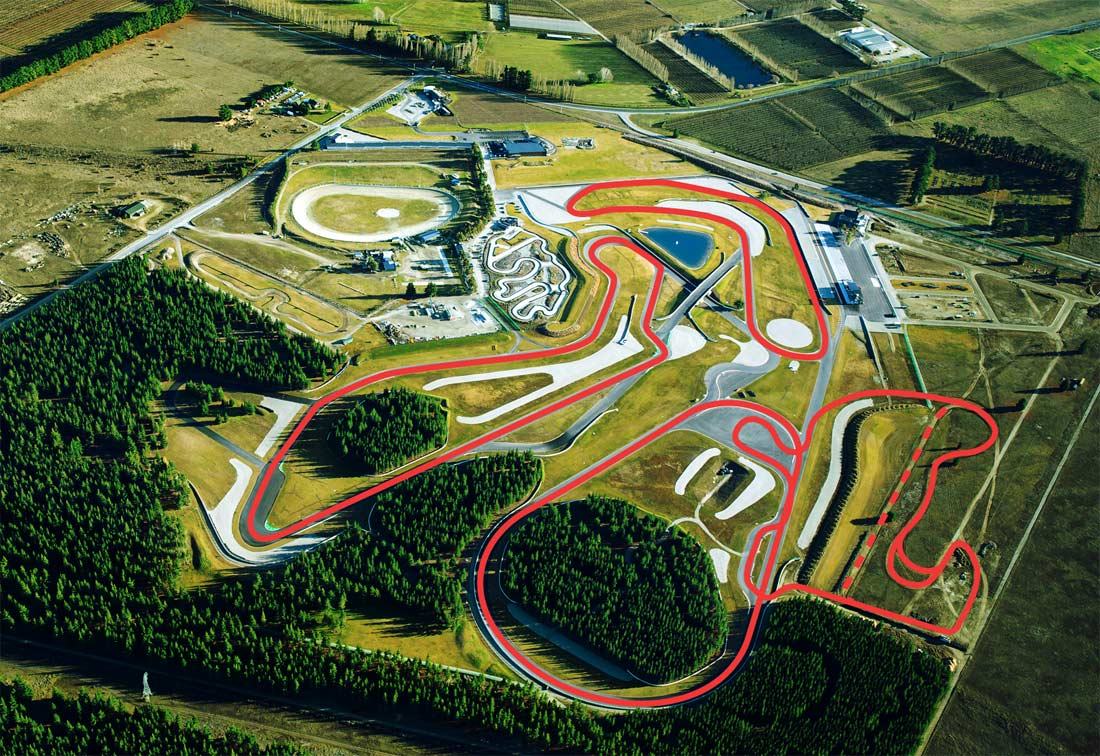
Highlands Motorsport Park, Cromwell

- Ardmore Airport (New Zealand), Auckland
- Beachlands Speedway, Waldronville, Dunedin
- Bruce McLaren Motorsport Park, Taupo
- Cemetery Circuit, Whanganui
- Dunedin Street Circuit
- Hamilton Street Circuit
- Hampton Downs Motorsport Park, Northern Waikato
- Highlands Motorsport Park, Cromwell
- Manfeild Autocourse, Feilding
- Euromarque Motorsport Park, Templeton
- Muriwai, beach motor racing from the 1920s to 1940s
- RNZAF Base Ohakea
- Paeroa Street Circuit
- Pukekohe Park Raceway
- Teretonga Park, Invercargill
- Thunder Ridge Motorsport Park, Waikato
- Timaru International Motor Raceway
- Waimate Street Circuit
- Wellington Street Circuit
- Western Springs Speedway
- Wigram Airfield Circuit

== Notable people ==
Ben Townley

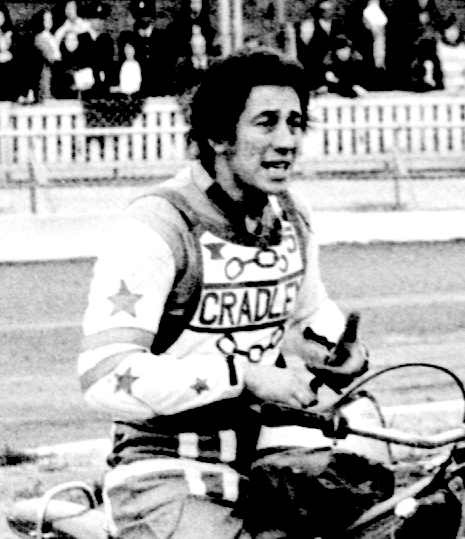
Bruce Cribb

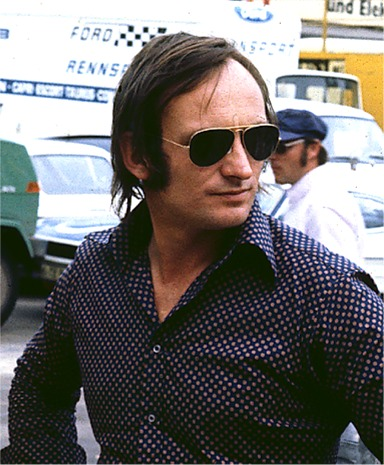
Chris Amon

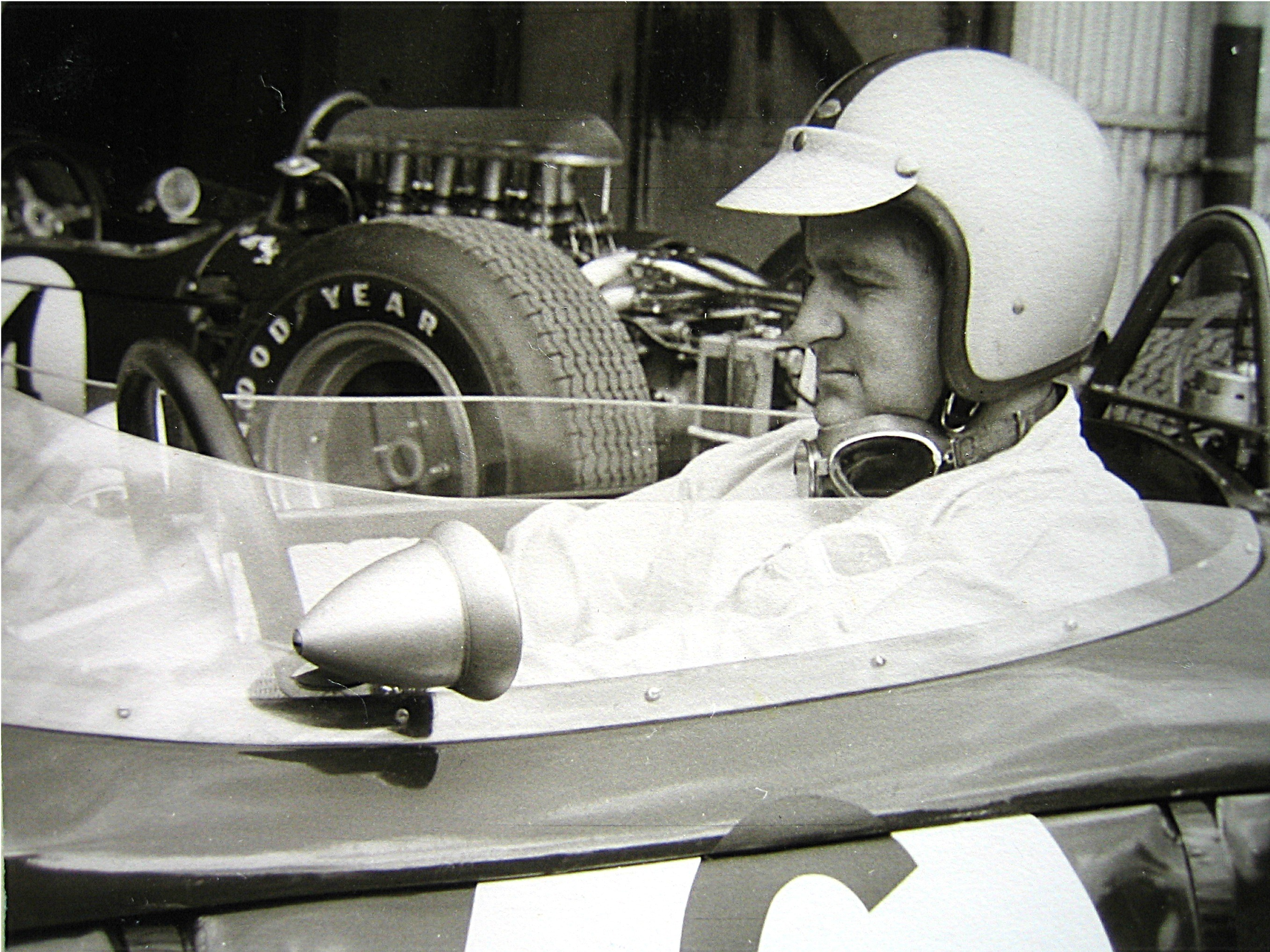
Denis Hulme

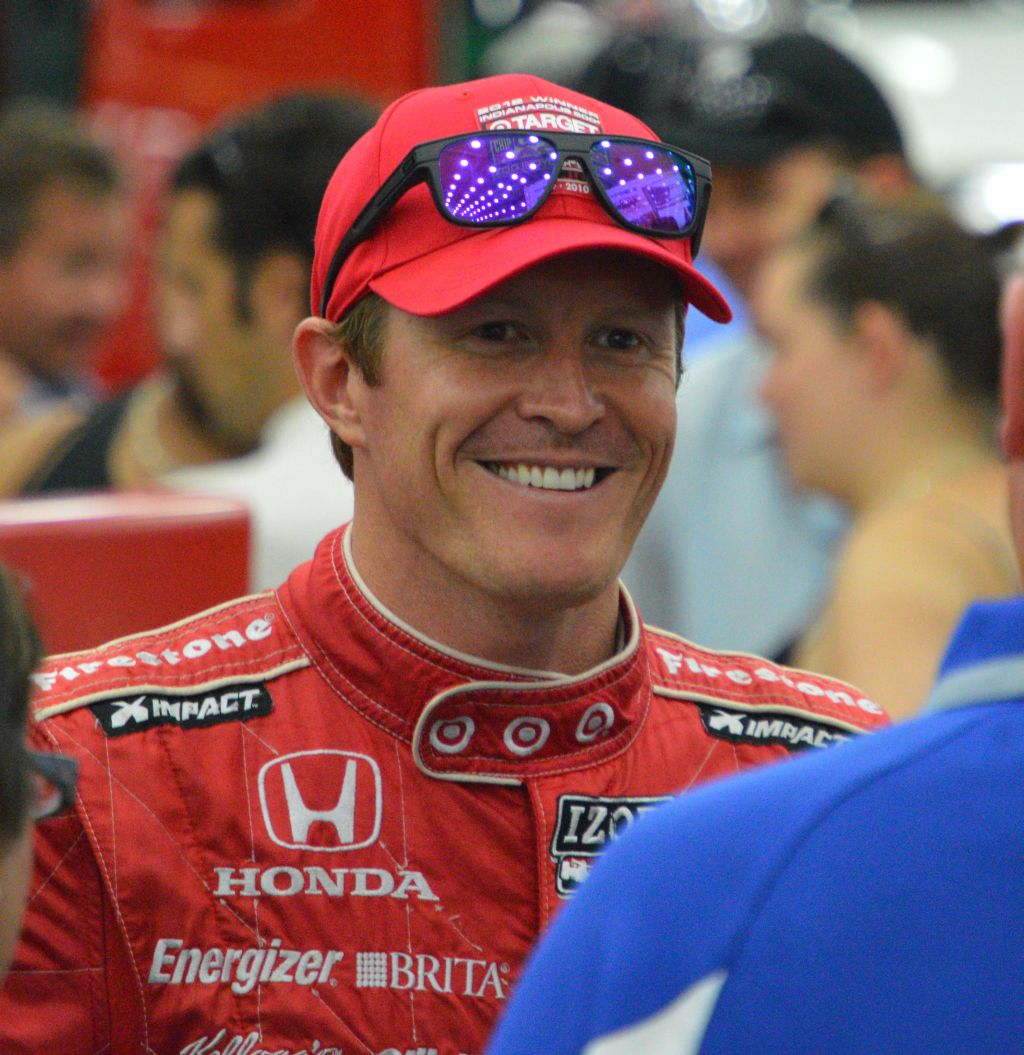
Scott Dixon

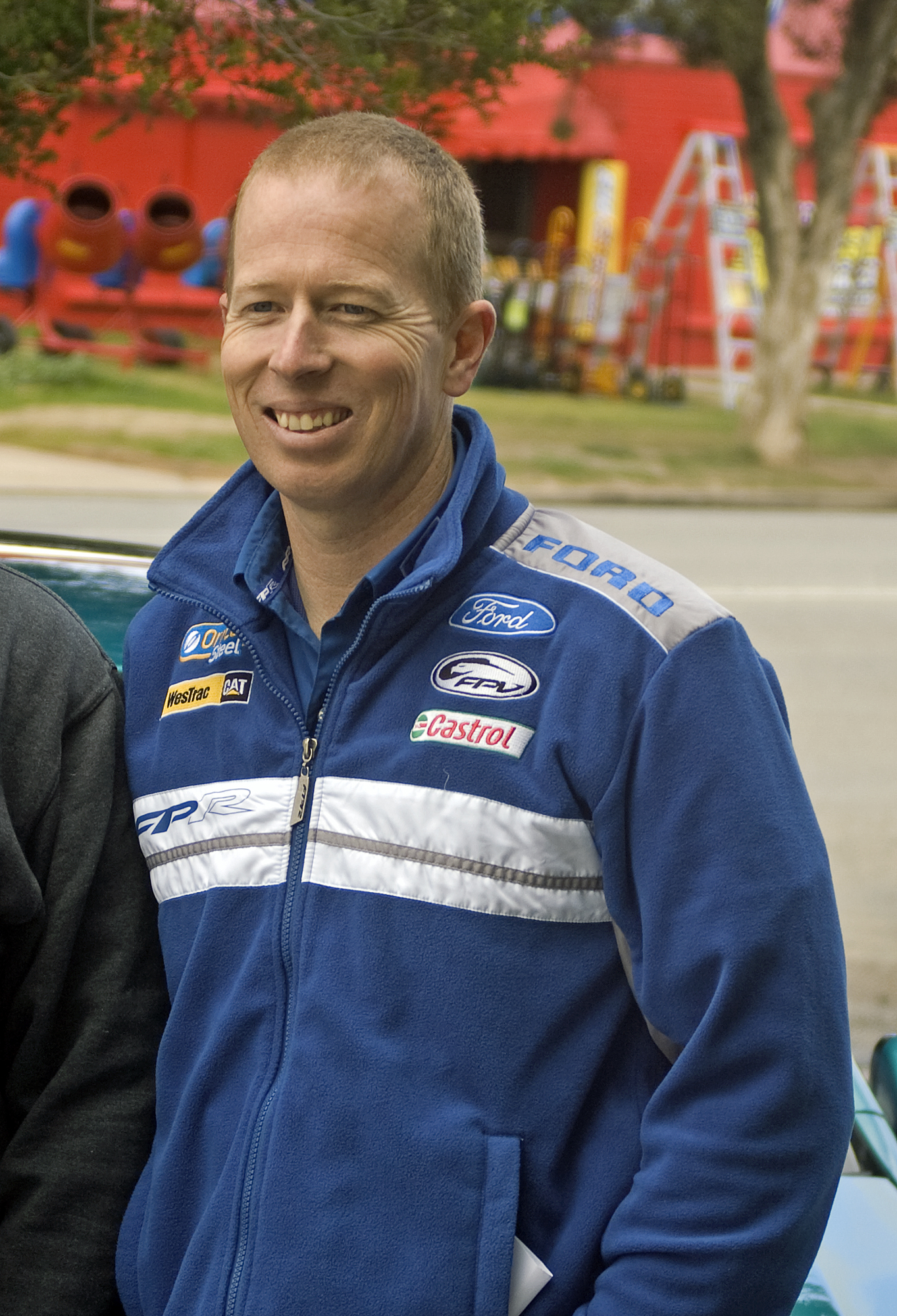
Steven Richards

- Paul Adams, rally driver
- Chris Amon, Formula 1 driver
- Hugh Anderson (motorcyclist), GP rider
- Bill Andrew, speedway rider
- Bruce Anstey, TT rider
- Marcus Armstrong, Indycar driver
- Andrew Bagnall, touring car driver
- Craig Baird, touring car and GT3 driver
- Earl Bamber, Porsche GTE driver
- Avalon Biddle, MotoGP rider
- Tom Black (speedway rider)
- Andy Booth (racing driver), open wheel and touring car driver
- Peter (Possum) Bourne, rally driver
- Barry Briggs, speedway rider
- Wayne Briggs, speedway rider
- Nick Cassidy, endurance and Formula E driver
- Victor Chapman (racing driver), drift driver
- Percy Coleman, motorcyclist.
- Rod Coleman (motorcycle racer). The first New Zealander to win the Isle of Man TT race in 1954 and the son of Percy Coleman.
- Josh Coppins, motocross rider
- Fabian Coulthard, touring car driver
- Simon Crafar, GP and enduro rider
- Bruce Cribb, speedway rider
- Neville Crichton, touring car driver
- Graeme Crosby, GP rider
- Mitch Cunningham, kart and GT3 racer
- Wade Cunningham, Indy Lights driver
- Grant Dalton, motorcyclist
- James Dawber, motorcyclist and holder of the world grass track speed record in 1917 on a 3.5 hp Indian
- Scott Dixon, Indy car driver
- Paul Dobbs, TT rider
- Mitch Evans, Formula E driver
- Simon Evans (racing driver), touring car driver
- John Faulkner (racing driver), touring and production car driver
- Angus Fogg, touring car driver
- Robbie Francevic. touring car driver
- Rodger Freeth, motorcyclist and sports car driver
- Howden Ganley, Formula 1 driver
- Antonio Marcel Green, drift and rally driver
- Daniel Gaunt, touring car driver
- Emma Gilmour, rally driver
- Matt Halliday, touring and GT car driver
- Brendon Hartley, FIA Endurance series driver
- John Hempleman, GP rider
- Bert Hawthorne, open wheel racer
- Andre Heimgartner, touring car driver
- Ernest F C Hinds, motorcyclist, horse owner, and cycle importer
- Dave Hiscock, speedway rider
- Neville Hiscock, GP rider
- Robert Holden (motorcyclist), GP and TT rider
- Mick Holland, speedway rider and founder New Zealand stock cars racing
- Denny Hulme, Formula 1 driver
- Dennis Ireland, GP rider
- Peter Janson, touring car driver
- Syd Jensen, motor cycle and sports car racer
- Ron Johnston, speedway rider
- Bob Kennett, Trans-Am driver and son of Brady Kennett
- Brady Kennett, touring and production car, and truck racer
- Wally Kilmister, grass track and speedway rider
- Darryl King, motocross rider
- Shayne King, motocross rider
- Chris Lange, rally driver
- Graeme Lawrence, open wheel car driver
- Liam Lawson, formula 1 driver
- Damon Leitch, Toyota Racing series driver
- Jono Lester, GT racing car driver
- Sybil Audrey Marie Lupp, sports car driver
- Geoff Mardon, speedway rider
- Ivan Mauger, motorcycle speedway rider
- Joe McAndrew, rally driver
- Bruce McLaren, Formula 1 and sports car driver
- Scott McLaughlin (racing driver), touring car driver
- Graham McRae, Formula 1 driver
- Rhys Millen, rally driver
- Rod Millen, rally driver
- Steve Millen, rally driver
- Ginger Molloy, GP rider
- Ronnie Moore (speedway rider)
- Ken Mudford, GP rider
- Burt Munro, speedway rider
- Greg Murphy, touring car driver
- Kim Newcombe, motor cycle racer
- John Nicholson (racing driver), Formula 1 driver
- Hayden Paddon, rally driver
- Matthew Payne, touring car driver
- Michael Pickens, speedway driver
- Paul Radisich, touring car driver
- Trevor Redmond, speedway rider
- Jason Richards, touring car driver
- Jim Richards (racing driver), touring car driver
- Steven Richards, touring car driver and son of Jim Richards
- Blair Robson, rally driver
- Larry Ross, speedway rider
- Dave Ryan (motorsport), team manager
- Kayne Scott, touring car driver
- Louis Sharp, open wheel driver
- Tony Shelly, Formula 1 driver
- Levi Sherwood, freestyle motocross rider
- Mitch Shirra, speedway rider
- Frank Shuter, speedway rider
- Aaron Slight, motor cycle and touring car racer
- Ken Smith (racing driver), open wheel racing driver
- Richie Stanaway, speedway and endurance car racer
- Dominic Storey, touring car driver
- Andrew Stroud, GP rider
- Mike Thackwell, open wheel racing driver
- Rick Timmo, speedway rider
- Ben Townley, motocross rider
- Ted Tracey, speedway driver
- Keith Turner (motorcyclist), GP rider
- Chris van der Drift, open wheel and GT driver
- Shane van Gisbergen, touring car and GT car driver
- Bob Wallace (test driver), mechanic, test driver, and developer
- "Mad" Mike Whiddett, drift racer
- Steve Williams, speedway driver and former caddy for Tiger Woods
- Simon Wills, touring car driver
- Rob Wilson (racing driver), endurance racing
- Ryan Wood (racing driver), touring car driver
- Alan Woodman, Isle of Mann TT rider from Blenheim who lost his leg during the 1910 race

== Manufacturers ==
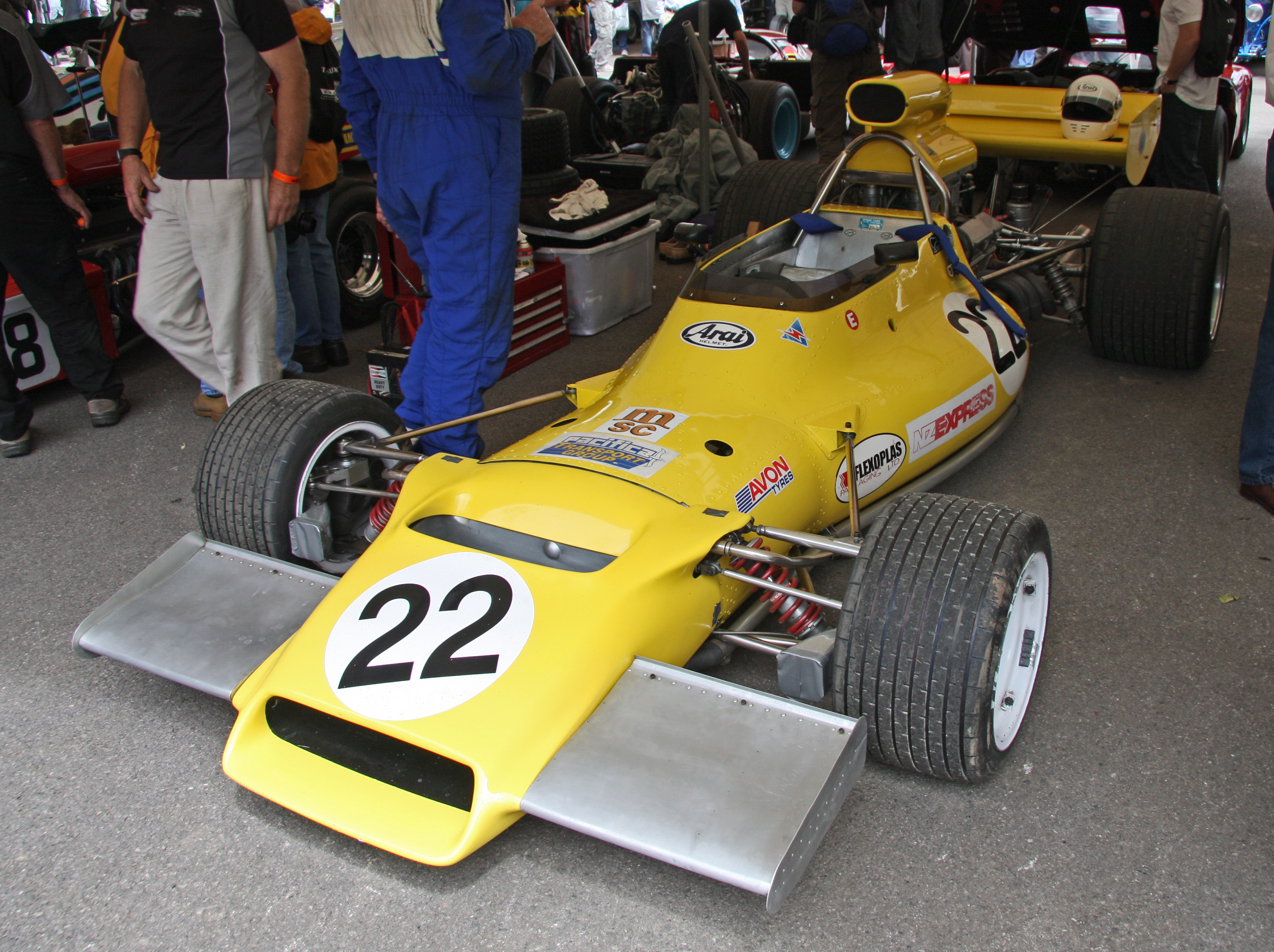
McRae GM1

- Almac (automobile) - sports cars
- Chevron Engineering Ltd - sports cars
- Heron Cars - sports cars
- McRae Cars - racing cars
- Malcolm Webb made the Mallock U2 Mark 8B, under licence from Arthur Mallock of England, in Wellington NZ in 1969.
- Rodin Cars - racing cars created by David Dicker
- Sabre Motorsport - Formula First manufacturer

== Clubs and organisations ==
Otago Sports Car Club

- Manawatu Motor Cycle Club - club formed in the early 20th century
- Marton Motor Cycle Club - extant in 1917
- Manukau Motor Boat Club - extant in 1917
- Motorcycling New Zealand Inc - successor to NZACU
- MotorSport New Zealand - governing body for motor sport
- Napier Motor Cycle Club - extant in 1917
- New Zealand Auto-Cycle Union (NZACU) - 1916 to 1994 - succeeded by Motor Cycling New Zealand
- New Zealand Drag Racing Association
- New Zealand Hot Rod Association
- New Zealand Power Boat Association - extant in 1917
- North Canterbury Motor Cycle Club - in existence prior to World War 1, but ceased by 1917
- North Island Riders Association - a riders union for professional North Island motor cycle riders extant in 1917
- Otago Motor Club - a motorsport club in existence from before 1914 based in Dunedin
- Otago Sports Car Club (OSCC) is a motorsport club based in Dunedin, New Zealand. Founded in 1947 the club is the main organisation for club-level motorsport in Dunedin. The OSCC is affiliated to, and a founder member of, Motorsport New Zealand the FIA sanctioned motor-sports authority of New Zealand. The OSCC organises the International Rally of Otago, a hillclimb championship, an autocross championship, assists with the Southern Festival of Speed, and publishes a quarterly magazine, Wheelspin.
- Otago Yacht and Motor Boat Club - early 20th century
- Pioneer Motorcycle Club (formerly the Pioneer Cycle Club) - the Canterbury-based club was founded in 1878 and renamed in the early 20th century.
- Wellington Motor Cycle Club - extant 1917

== Publications ==
- New Zealand Hot Rod began publishing in 1967
- The motor in New Zealand - an annual magazine supplement of Progress a publication from the early 1900s by Harry H Tomb's Ltd
- Wheeling - a pre WW1 cycling and motor cycling magazine that continued in publication during World War 1
- Wheelspin - Otago Car Club magazine

== Teams ==
- International Motorsport - Auckland based touring car racing team
- Mark Petch Motorsport - touring car and transam racing team disbanded in 2009

== Illegal motor sport ==
New Zealand also has strict rules on vehicle modifications and a registered engineer must audit any major modification and certify road-worthiness within a system known as the Low Volume Vehicle Technical Association. The LVVTA exists to service legal motorsport and responsible modifications only. Unofficial street racing remains illegal and police are well endowed with equipment to use, such as 'sustained loss of traction' which carries a minimum sentence of licence disqualification and maximum sentence of imprisonment. Street racing is common in New Zealand and there are many small clubs offering street racing in remote rural roads. Despite its popularity, rates of incident due to street racing in New Zealand are relatively low.
