= List of New Zealand sportspeople =

The following is a list of New Zealand sportspeople.

== Basketball ==
- Steven Adams – basketball player
- Pero Cameron – basketball player
- Sean Marks – basketball player
- Dan Shamir (born 1975) - Israeli professional basketball coach, lives in Auckland

== Golf ==
- Michael Campbell – golfer
- Sir Bob Charles – champion golfer
- Ryan Fox - golfer
- Lydia Ko - champion golfer
- Danny Lee - golfer
- Phil Tataurangi - golfer
- Steve Williams – caddy

== Motorsports ==
- Chris Amon – Formula One and sports car driver
- Bruce Anstey - motorcycle road racer
- Brendon Hartley – Ex Formula One Driver and Two time WEC winner including 24 of Le mans Win
- Possum Bourne – rally driving
- Barry Briggs - motorcycle speedway rider
- Nick Cassidy - Formula E Driver
- Simon Crafar - motorcycle road racer
- Graeme Crosby - motorcycle road racer
- Scott Dixon – Six-time IndyCar champion, 2008 Indy 500 Champion
- Mitch Evans - Formula E Driver
- Denny Hulme – 1967 Formula One champion
- Chris Lange - rally driver
- Liam Lawson - Formula One driver
- Ivan Mauger – six-time motorcycle speedway world champion
- Bruce McLaren – Formula One and CanAm driver
- Scott McLaughlin - touring car driver, IndyCar Driver
- Stefan Merriman - enduro rider
- Steve Millen – sports car and off-road truck driver
- Burt Munro – motorcycle speedway and land speed record holder
- Greg Murphy – touring car driver
- Chris Pither – touring car driver
- Aaron Slight - motorcycle road racer
- Ben Townley - World Champion, Motocross
- Ted Tracey - Speedway racing driver
- Shane van Gisbergen - touring car driver
- Cole Davies - Motocross and Supercross racer

== Cricket ==
Main articles: List of New Zealand Test cricketers, List of New Zealand ODI cricketers, List of New Zealand Twenty20 International cricketers

See also:New Zealand national cricket team, New Zealand women's national cricket team

- Craig Auckram
- Brendon McCullum
- Kane Williamson
- Ross Taylor
- Richard Hadlee
- Shane Bond
- Martin Crowe
- Trent Boult
- Lockie Ferguson
- Tim Southee
- James Neesham
- Bradley-John Watling
- Ajaz Patel
- James Franklin
- Scott Styris
- Corey Anderson
- Tom Latham
- Colin de Grandhomme
- Jacob Oram
- Stephen Fleming
- Daniel Vettori
- Craig McMillan
- Liz Perry
- Shane Bond

== Track and field ==
- Valerie Adams – shotputter, four-time Olympic Champion
- David Ambler – 100m, 200m sprints
- Anne Audain – runner
- Hamish Carter – triathlete
- Rod Dixon – runner
- Murray Halberg – runner
- Jack Lovelock – runner
- Arthur Lydiard – running coach
- Lorraine Moller – runner, won Boston Marathon
- Eliza McCartney - pole vaulter, Olympic bronze medallist
- Dick Quax – runner
- Allison Roe – runner, won Boston and New York City Marathons 1981
- Peter Snell – runner, three times Olympic Champion
- John Walker – runner, Olympic champion
- Nick Willis – runner, Commonwealth champion, Olympic silver medallist
- John Young - ultra distance runner; first person to run from Wellington to Auckland 1962 and Bluff to Cape Reinga 1964; first person to run across the Nulabhour Plain in Australia 1968

== Watersports ==
- Jo Aleh – world champion and Olympic champion sailor
- Sir Peter Blake – yachtsman
- Trent Bray – world champion swimmer
- Nathan Cohen - world champion and Olympic champion rower
- Russell Coutts – yachtsman, Olympic Champion
- Caroline Evers-Swindell - champion rower
- Georgina Evers-Swindell - champion rower
- Ian Ferguson – kayaker
- Danyon Loader – double olympic champion swimmer
- Jonathan Winter – world champion swimmer

== Miscellaneous ==
- Margaret Jane Briggs, show-ring rider
- Christine Jensen Burke – mountaineer
- Helen Clarke - field hockey player
- Cheree Crowley – professional wrestler
- Dame Susan Devoy - squash player
- Bob Fitzsimmons – world boxing heavyweight champion (born in UK, raised in NZ)
- Tom Fyfe – mountaineer and mountain guide
- Tony Garea – former WWWF/WWF professional wrestler
- Sir Edmund Hillary – mountaineer
- Mark Hunt - mixed martial artist
- Precious McKenzie – weightlifter (born in South Africa)
- Mark Todd – equestrian
- Sarah Ulmer – cyclist
- Michael Walker – jockey
- Sarah Walker – BMX rider
- Tony Wilding – tennis player
