= Festival of speed =

Festival of speed, a name given to motorsport events, may refer to:

- Asian Festival of Speed, in Asian countries, especially Malaysia and China; see Zhuhai International Circuit
- Goodwood Festival of Speed, in the United Kingdom
- Monterey Festival of Speed, in the United States; see 2008 Atlantic Championship
- Southern Festival of Speed, in New Zealand
