= 2013 Suzuki Swift Sport Cup =

Seasons
- ← 2011–12 none →

The 2013 Suzuki Swift Sport Cup (known for commercial reasons as the 2013 Winger Suzuki Swift Sport Cup) was the sixth and final Suzuki Swift Sport Cup season. The season began at Hampton Downs Motorsport Park on 16 February and finished at Pukekohe Park Raceway on 8 December 2013 after seven rounds. The series shifted from the supporting act for the New Zealand V8s to become the supporting class for the V8SuperTourer Championship.

Shaun Lawrence won the championship in his third attempt at the title after a strong, consistent campaign. With low entry numbers as well as the emergence of the Toyota 86 series, this would prove to be the final season of the Suzuki Swift Sport Cup.

== Calendar ==
Rnd	Circuit	Date	Map
1	Hampton Downs Motorsport Park (Hampton Downs, North Waikato)	16–17 February	2013 Suzuki Swift Sport Cup is located in New Zealand
2	Powerbuilt Raceway at Ruapuna Park (Christchurch, Canterbury Region)	9–10 March	2013 Suzuki Swift Sport Cup is located in New Zealand
3	Pukekohe Park Raceway (Pukekohe, Auckland Region)	25–26 May	2013 Suzuki Swift Sport Cup is located in New Zealand
4	Taupo Motorsport Park (Taupō, Waikato)	31 August–1 September	2013 Suzuki Swift Sport Cup is located in New Zealand
5	Hampton Downs Motorsport Park (Hampton Downs, North Waikato)	18–19 October	2013 Suzuki Swift Sport Cup is located in New Zealand
6	Pukekohe Park Raceway (Pukekohe, Auckland Region)	29–30 November	2013 Suzuki Swift Sport Cup is located in New Zealand

== Teams and drivers ==
The following teams and drivers will competed during the 2013 season.

Team	No.	Driver	Rounds
Chris Cox Motorsport	2	(New Zealand) Chris Cox	1
	2	(New Zealand) Cody McMaster	2
Castrol EDGE Scholarship	6	(New Zealand) Josh Drysdale	All
Winger Racing Team	11	(New Zealand) Grant Ryan	1–5
GP Team Racing	12	(New Zealand) Andrew Vincent	All
Shaun Lawrence Racing	14	(New Zealand) Shaun Lawrence	All
Betta Motorsport	17	(New Zealand) Glen Collinson	All
Betta Motorsport	71	(New Zealand) Sam Barry	All
Thomas Joyes Racing	35	(New Zealand) Ben MacDonald	3–6
Thomas Joyes Racing	96	(New Zealand) Thomas Joyes	1–3, 5–6
Campbell Christie Racing	55	(New Zealand) Campbell Christie	1–3
Robertson Motorsport	63	(New Zealand) Blair Robertson	1–5

== Results and standings ==
=== Season summary ===
Rnd		Circuit	Winning driver	Winning team
1	R1	Hampton Downs Motorsport Park (Hampton Downs, North Waikato)	(New Zealand) Shaun Lawrence	Shaun Lawrence Racing
1	R2	Hampton Downs Motorsport Park (Hampton Downs, North Waikato)	(New Zealand) Shaun Lawrence*	Shaun Lawrence Racing
1	R3	Hampton Downs Motorsport Park (Hampton Downs, North Waikato)	(New Zealand) Shaun Lawrence	Shaun Lawrence Racing
2	R1	Powerbuilt Raceway at Ruapuna Park (Christchurch, Canterbury)	(New Zealand) Grant Ryan*	Winger Racing Team
2	R2	Powerbuilt Raceway at Ruapuna Park (Christchurch, Canterbury)	(New Zealand) Cody McMaster	
2	R3	Powerbuilt Raceway at Ruapuna Park (Christchurch, Canterbury)	(New Zealand) Shaun Lawrence*	Shaun Lawrence Racing
3	R1	Pukekohe Park Raceway (Pukekohe, Auckland)	(New Zealand) Shaun Lawrence*	Shaun Lawrence Racing
3	R2	Pukekohe Park Raceway (Pukekohe, Auckland)	(New Zealand) Glen Collinson	Betta Motorsport
3	R3	Pukekohe Park Raceway (Pukekohe, Auckland)	(New Zealand) Shaun Lawrence	Shaun Lawrence Racing
4	R1	Taupo International Motorsport Park (Taupō, Waikato)	(New Zealand) Josh Drysdale	Castrol EDGE Scholarship
4	R2	Taupo International Motorsport Park (Taupō, Waikato)	(New Zealand) Sam Barry	Betta Motorsport
4	R3	Taupo International Motorsport Park (Taupō, Waikato)	(New Zealand) Shaun Lawrence	Shaun Lawrence Racing
5	R1	Hampton Downs Motorsport Park (Hampton Downs, North Waikato)	(New Zealand) Shaun Lawrence	Shaun Lawrence Racing
5	R2	Hampton Downs Motorsport Park (Hampton Downs, North Waikato)	(New Zealand) Glen Collinson	Betta Motorsport
5	R3	Hampton Downs Motorsport Park (Hampton Downs, North Waikato)	(New Zealand) Josh Drysdale	Castrol EDGE Scholarship
6	R1	Pukekohe Park Raceway (Pukekohe, Auckland)	(New Zealand) Shaun Lawrence	Shaun Lawrence Racing
6	R2	Pukekohe Park Raceway (Pukekohe, Auckland)	(New Zealand) Shaun Lawrence	Shaun Lawrence Racing
6	R3	Pukekohe Park Raceway (Pukekohe, Auckland)	(New Zealand) Shaun Lawrence	Shaun Lawrence Racing

- Andrew Vincent had initially won these races but was later disqualified owing to a technical infringement. All points earned in these races were subsequently wiped.

=== Championship standings ===
Pos	Driver	HAM			RUA			PUK			TAU			HAM			PUK			Pen.	Pts
Pos	Driver	R1	R2	R3	R1	R2	R3	R1	R2	R3	R1	R2	R3	R1	R2	R3	R1	R2	R3	Pen.	Pts
1	(New Zealand) Shaun Lawrence	1	1	1	2	6	1	1	3	1	6	6	1	1	4	3	1	1	1		648
2	(New Zealand) Josh Drysdale	5	6	5	5	Ret	3	4	4	3	1	2	2	2	2	1	2	3	4		558
3	(New Zealand) Sam Barry	3	4	3	3	7	2	2	2	2	2	1	3	5	3	6	5	4	3		537
4	(New Zealand) Glen Collinson	6	3	7	6	3	7	3	1	6	5	3	7	4	1	2	7	2	2		529
5	(New Zealand) Grant Ryan	2	2	2	1	2	4	Ret	Ret	DNS	7	4	4	7	5	4					324.5
6	(New Zealand) Ben MacDonald							5	6	4	3	5	5	3	6	7	4	6	6		323
7	(New Zealand) Blair Robertson	7	5	6	8	4	5	6	5	5	4	7	6	6	Ret	5					300
8	(New Zealand) Thomas Joyes	8	7	8	7	5	8	7	7	7				8	Ret	8	6	5	5		297
9	(New Zealand) Campbell Christie	9	8	9	9	Ret	9	8	Ret	8											115
10	(New Zealand) Cody McMaster				4	1	6														81
11	(New Zealand) Andrew Vincent	DQ	DQ	DQ	DQ	DQ	DQ	DQ	DQ	DQ	DQ	DQ	DQ	DQ	DQ	DQ	3	DNS	DNS	-458.5	56
12	(New Zealand) Chris Cox	4	Ret	4																	50
Pos	Driver	R1	R2	R3	R1	R2	R3	R1	R2	R3	R1	R2	R3	R1	R2	R3	R1	R2	R3	Pen.	Pts
Pos	Driver	HAM			RUA			PUK			TAU			HAM			PUK			Pen.	Pts
