= Historic motorsport =

Type of motorsport with vehicles limited to a particular era

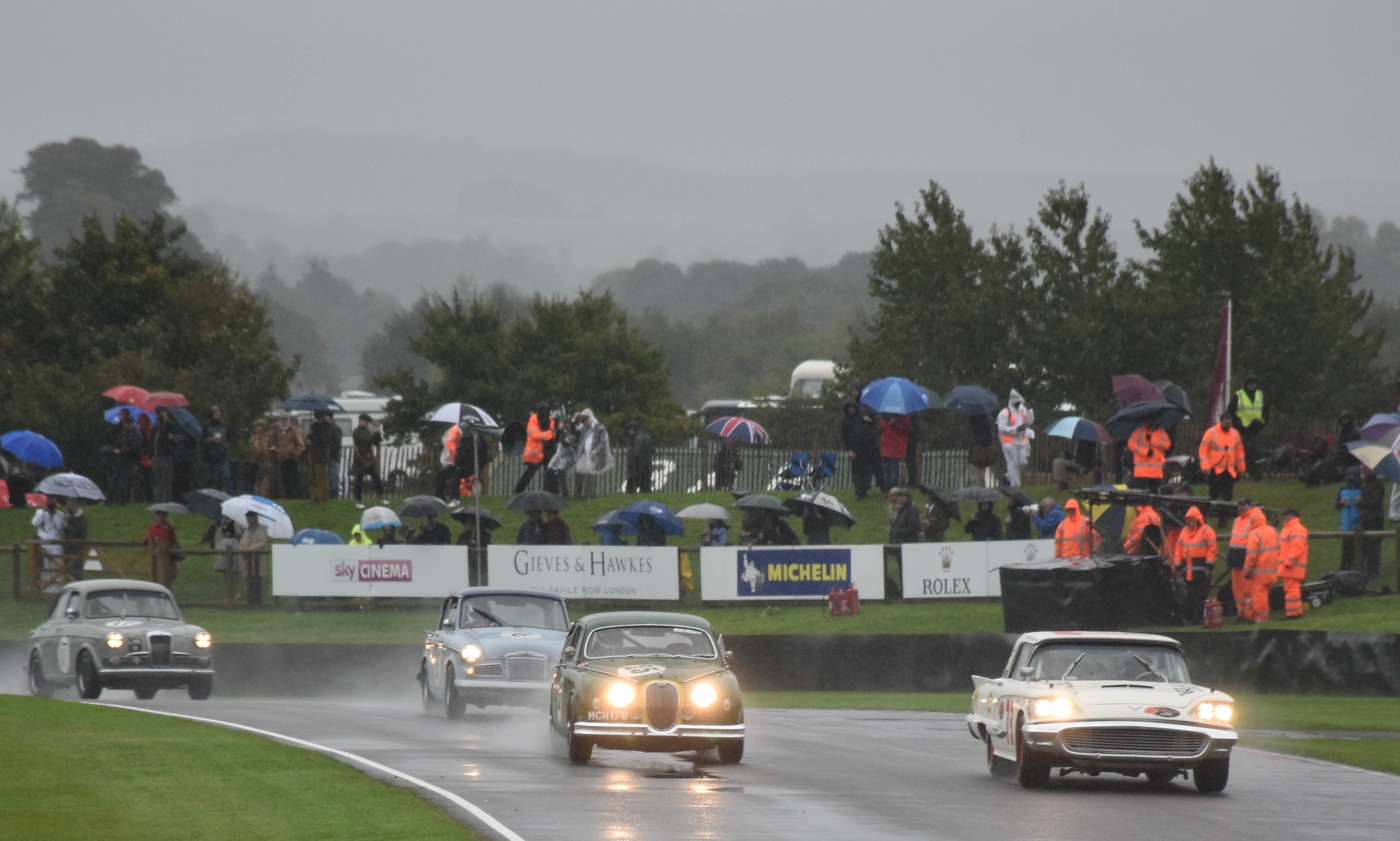
Historic cars racing during the 2017 Goodwood Revival.

Historic motorsport or vintage motorsport, is motorsport with vehicles limited to a particular era. Only safety precautions are modernized in these hobbyist races. A historical event can be of various types of motorsport disciplines, from road racing to rallying.

== Events ==
Some of the most famous events are the Goodwood Festival of Speed and Goodwood Revival in Britain, Le Mans Classic in France, and Monterey Historic in the United States. Championships range from "grass root" Austin Seven racing to the FIA Thoroughbred Grand Prix Championship for classic Formula One chassis. In Canada, the Vintage Automobile Racing Association of Canada annually hosts the VARAC Vintage Grand Prix at Canadian Tire Motorsport Park (formerly known as Mosport.)

While there are several professional teams and drivers in historical racing, this branch of motorsport tends to be contested by wealthy car owners and is thus more amateur and laid back in its approach. One advantage of historical motorsport is that once a series for a particular category is introduced, it helps to increase the value of its competing cars, sometimes approaching the million dollar mark, therefore as a result, many of these are carefully driven by its owners and are occasionally used to bring in spectators.

== Notable historic motorsport events ==
The list are for events that has run at least three years and are internationally recognised events.

Event	Current/last venue	Country	Year
Brian Redman International Challenge	Road America	United States	2001–date
Cholmondeley Pageant of Power	Cholmondeley Castle	United Kingdom	2008–date
Circuit des Remparts	Angoulême	France	1979–date
Coronado Speed Festival	Naval Air Station North Island	United States	1997–2016
Coys Historic Festival	Silverstone Circuit; Rockingham Motor Speedway	United Kingdom	1990s–2001, continued as Silverstone Classic
Eifelrennen um den "Jan Wellem Pokal"	Nürburgring	Germany	2011–date
Goodwood Festival of Speed	Goodwood House	United Kingdom	1993–date
Goodwood Revival	Goodwood Circuit	United Kingdom	1998–date
Grand Prix de l'âge d'or	Dijon-Prenois	France	1964–date
Hamburger Stadtpark Revival	Hamburger Stadtpark	Germany	1999–date
Indy Legends Charity Pro–Am race	Indianapolis Motor Speedway	United States	2014–date
La Carrera Panamericana	From Oaxaca to Nuevo Laredo	Mexico	1988–date
Le Mans Classic	Fra: Circuit de la Sarthe; Jpn: Fuji Speedway	France; Japan	Fra: 2002–date Jpn: 2005–2007
Lime Rock Vintage Festival	Lime Rock Park	United States	1983–date
Masters Historic Festival	Brands Hatch	United Kingdom	–date
Donington Historic Festival	Donington Park	United Kingdom	2001–date
Mille Miglia Storica	Brescia to Rome and Brescia	Italy	1977–date
Copenhagen Historic Grand Prix	Bellahøj Park	Denmark	1996–date
Historic Grand Prix of Monaco	Circuit de Monaco	Monaco	1997–date
Historic Pau Grand Prix	Pau	France	
Historic Grand Prix of Porto	Circuito da Boavista	Portugal	2005–date
Grand Prix Historique of Tunis	Avenue Habib Bourguiba	Tunisia	2000–date
Historic Grand Prix Zandvoort	Circuit Zandvoort	Netherlands	2012–date
Race Retro	Stoneleigh Park, Coventry	United Kingdom	2002–date
Rolex Monterey Motorsports Reunion	Mazda Raceway Laguna Seca	United States	1974–date
Muscle Car Masters	Sydney Motorsport Park	Australia	2005–date
Nismo Festival	Fuji Speedway	Japan	1997–date
Oldtimer Festival um den "Jan-Wellem-Pokal"	Nürburgring	Germany	1983–2010, continued as Eifelrennen
Oldtimer Grand Prix	Nürburgring	Germany	1974–date
Oldtimer Grand Prix	Salzburgring	Austria	1974–date
Oulton Park Gold Cup	Oulton Park	United Kingdom	2002–date
Pittsburgh Vintage Grand Prix	Schenley Park	United States	1982–date
Porsche Rennsport Reunion	Mazda Raceway Laguna Seca	United States	2001–date
Silverstone Classic	Silverstone Circuit	United Kingdom	2001, 2005–date
Spa Six Hours	Circuit de Spa-Francorchamps	Belgium	
Sonoma Historic Motorsports Festival	Sonoma Raceway	United States	1995–date
Southern Festival of Speed	Dunedin Street Circuit; Timaru International Motor Raceway; Ruapuna Park; Teretonga Park	New Zealand	–2008
Tour de France Automobile	Paris - Evian	France	1992–date
Toyota Motorsports Festival	Fuji Speedway	Japan	–date
VHRR Historic Sandown	Sandown Raceway	Australia	1992–date
Rajd Rembertowski	Rembertów Warsaw	Poland	2016-date

== Notable series ==
- Classic Endurance Racing
- Historic Formula One Championship
- Orwell SuperSports Cup
- Historic Ferrari Challenge (formerly Historic Ferrari Maserati Challenge)
- GLPpro.de Historic Regularity Racing on Race Tracks

== Notable organizations ==
Europe

- Classic Endurance Racing (CER)
- Group C Racing Series (formerly Group C GTP Racing)
- Historic Grand Prix Cars Association (HGPCA)
- Masters Historic Racing
- Motor Racing Legends (MRL)

United Kingdom

- Classic Sports Car Club (CSCC)
- Historic Sports Car Club (HSCC)
- Vintage Motor Cycle Club (VMCC)
- Vintage Sports Car Club (VSCC)

United States

- American Historic Racing Motorcycle Association (AHRMA)
- Historic Motor Sports Association (HMSA)
- Historic Sportscar Racing (HSR)
- Sportscar Vintage Racing Association (SVRA)
- Vintage Auto Racing Association (VARA)

Australia

- Historic Sports and Racing Car Association (HSRCA)

1000 Millas Sport Patagonia argentina argentina 1989-

== See also ==
- Classic rally
- Nostalgia drag racing
