= 2025–26 TA2 NZ Championship =

Scheduled motorsport race series

The 2025–26 TA2 NZ Championship (known for commercial reasons as the 2025–26 SP Tools TA2 NZ Championship) was a national motor racing series conducted using TA2-class cars. Whilst TA2 racing had taken place in New Zealand over the previous two years, this season marked the first to be granted championship status by MotorSport New Zealand.

The season began at Hampton Downs Motorsport Park on October 31, 2025, and concluded at Taupo International Motorsport Park on 11 April 2026. The championship was originally meant to conclude one day later. However, the risk of Cyclone Vaianu caused the final event to be shortened from the traditional three-race programme to just one. As a result, Caleb Byers was declared the championship winner after a strong, consistent campaign.

== Calendar ==
The following circuits are due to host a round of the 2026 championship.

Round	Circuit	Date	Supporting	Map of circuit locations
2025				2025–26 TA2 NZ Championship is located in New Zealand
1	Hampton Downs Motorsport Park (Hampton Downs, North Waikato)	31 October–2 November	GT World Challenge Australia; GT4 Australia Series	2025–26 TA2 NZ Championship is located in New Zealand
2	Hampton Downs Motorsport Park (Hampton Downs, North Waikato)	22–23 November		2025–26 TA2 NZ Championship is located in New Zealand
2026				2025–26 TA2 NZ Championship is located in New Zealand
3	Teretonga Park (Invercargill, Southland)	23–25 January	Formula Regional Oceania Trophy; Toyota GR86 Championship	2025–26 TA2 NZ Championship is located in New Zealand
4	Highlands Motorsport Park (Cromwell, Southland)	30 January–1 February	Formula Regional Oceania Trophy; Toyota GR86 Championship	2025–26 TA2 NZ Championship is located in New Zealand
5	Manfeild: Circuit Chris Amon (Feilding, Manawatu)	27 February–1 March		2025–26 TA2 NZ Championship is located in New Zealand
6	Taupo International Motorsport Park (Taupō, Waikato)	10–12 April	Supercars Championship	2025–26 TA2 NZ Championship is located in New Zealand

== Teams and drivers ==
Manufacturer	Car	No.	Driver	Class	Rounds
Chevrolet	Camaro	5	(New Zealand) Andrew Turner	M	1, 6
Chevrolet	Camaro	11	(New Zealand) Mark Pitcher	M	All
Chevrolet	Camaro	33	(New Zealand) Caleb Byers		All
Chevrolet	Camaro	38	(New Zealand) Lance Gerlach	M	2–6
Chevrolet	Camaro	61	(New Zealand) Karl Gaines	M	All
Chevrolet	Camaro	69	(New Zealand) Peter Ward	M	All
Chevrolet	Camaro	71	(New Zealand) Jamie McDonald		All
Chevrolet	Camaro	143	(New Zealand) John Roberts	M	2, 6
Dodge	Challenger	7	(Australia) Tyler Cheney		6
Dodge	Challenger	15	(New Zealand) Paul Manuell	M	4–6
Dodge	Challenger	17	(Australia) Will Davison		4
Dodge	Challenger	20	(New Zealand) Dylan Grant		All
Dodge	Challenger	24	(New Zealand) Maurice Shapley	M	1–2
Dodge	Challenger	77	(New Zealand) Elton Wichman	M	1–4, 6
Dodge	Challenger	93	(New Zealand) Daynom Templeman		1
Dodge	Challenger	98	(New Zealand) Leo Bult	M	All
Ford	Mustang	15	(New Zealand) Brianna Hughes		1–2
Ford	Mustang	28	(New Zealand) Clay Osborne		1
Ford	Mustang	28	(New Zealand) Elton Wichman	M	5
Ford	Mustang	74	(New Zealand) Toby Elmiger		All
Ford	Mustang	75	(New Zealand) Rhys Gould	M	1–2
Ford	Mustang	75	(New Zealand) Jaden Ransley		3–4
Ford	Mustang	88	(New Zealand) Daniel Udy		1–2
Ford	Mustang	97	(New Zealand) Roger Beuvink	M	6

Icon	Class
M	Masters

- Nathan Herne was initially scheduled to compete in the number 15 Dodge Challenger for the final round in Taupo.

== Results and standings ==
=== Results ===
Rnd		Circuit	Pole position	Fastest lap	Winning driver	Winning vehicle
1	R1	Hampton Downs Motorsport Park (Hampton Downs, North Waikato)	(New Zealand) Dylan Grant	(New Zealand) Caleb Byers	(New Zealand) Clay Osborne	Ford Mustang
1	R2	Hampton Downs Motorsport Park (Hampton Downs, North Waikato)		(New Zealand) Clay Osborne	(New Zealand) Clay Osborne	Ford Mustang
1	R3	Hampton Downs Motorsport Park (Hampton Downs, North Waikato)		(New Zealand) Dylan Grant	(New Zealand) Dylan Grant	Dodge Challenger
2	R1	Hampton Downs Motorsport Park (Hampton Downs, North Waikato)	(New Zealand) Dylan Grant	(New Zealand) Dylan Grant	(New Zealand) Dylan Grant	Dodge Challenger
2	R2	Hampton Downs Motorsport Park (Hampton Downs, North Waikato)		(New Zealand) Caleb Byers	(New Zealand) Dylan Grant	Dodge Challenger
2	R3	Hampton Downs Motorsport Park (Hampton Downs, North Waikato)		(New Zealand) Caleb Byers	(New Zealand) Toby Elmiger	Ford Mustang
3	R1	Teretonga Park (Invercargill, Southland)	(New Zealand) Caleb Byers	(New Zealand) Caleb Byers	(New Zealand) Caleb Byers	Chevrolet Camaro
3	R2	Teretonga Park (Invercargill, Southland)		(New Zealand) Dylan Grant	(New Zealand) Caleb Byers	Chevrolet Camaro
3	R3	Teretonga Park (Invercargill, Southland)		(New Zealand) Toby Elmiger	(New Zealand) Toby Elmiger	Ford Mustang
4	R1	Highlands Motorsport Park (Cromwell, Southland)	(New Zealand) Caleb Byers	(New Zealand) Jaden Ransley	(New Zealand) Jaden Ransley	Ford Mustang
4	R2	Highlands Motorsport Park (Cromwell, Southland)		(Australia) Will Davison	(New Zealand) Caleb Byers	Chevrolet Camaro
4	R3	Highlands Motorsport Park (Cromwell, Southland)		(New Zealand) Dylan Grant	(New Zealand) Dylan Grant	Dodge Challenger
5	R1	Manfeild: Circuit Chris Amon (Feilding, Manawatu)	(New Zealand) Dylan Grant	(New Zealand) Dylan Grant	(New Zealand) Dylan Grant	Dodge Challenger
5	R2	Manfeild: Circuit Chris Amon (Feilding, Manawatu)		(New Zealand) Dylan Grant	(New Zealand) Dylan Grant	Dodge Challenger
5	R3	Manfeild: Circuit Chris Amon (Feilding, Manawatu)		(New Zealand) Dylan Grant	(New Zealand) Dylan Grant	Dodge Challenger
6		Taupo International Motorsport Park (Taupō, Waikato)	(New Zealand) Dylan Grant	(New Zealand) Caleb Byers	(New Zealand) Caleb Byers	Chevrolet Camaro

=== Standings ===
Pos.	Driver	HAM1			HAM2			TER			HIG			MAN			TAU	Pen	Points
1	(New Zealand) Caleb Byers	3	2	2	2	2	3	1	1	4	2	1	4	2	3	2	1	0	1169
2	(New Zealand) Dylan Grant	2	3	1	1	1	5	3	3	2	12	5	1	1	1	1	2	0	1148
3	(New Zealand) Toby Elmiger	6	4	3	3	3	1	2	6	1	4	4	9	3	2	3	3	0	1018
4	(New Zealand) Jamie McDonald	8	8	6	5	6	2	6	4	3	6	6	6	4	8	4	11	0	825
5	(New Zealand) Peter Ward	5	5	5	4	4	4	5	2	6	Ret	8	5	6	4	Ret	5	0	787
6	(New Zealand) Karl Gaines				7	5	7	7	Ret	7	8	11	7	5	5	6	6	0	580
7	(New Zealand) Elton Wichman	10	15	9	10	8	8	11	10	11	10	12	10	9	Ret	7	10	0	554
8	(New Zealand) Mark Pitcher	13	13	10	13	9	9	10	9	9	11	Ret	12	10	6	9	8	0	540
9	(New Zealand) Lance Gerlach				9	7	6	9	7	10	9	10	11	8	9	5	14	0	524
10	(New Zealand) Leo Built	9	7	Ret	Ret	Ret	DNS	8	8	8	7	9	8	7	7	10	Ret	0	481
11	(New Zealand) Jaden Ransley							4	5	5	1	2	2					0	393
12	(New Zealand) Rhys Gould	7	9	7	8	10	Ret											0	215
13	(Australia) Will Davison										3	3	3					0	195
14	(New Zealand) Paul Manuell										5	7	Ret	Ret	Ret	8	12	0	195
15	(New Zealand) Clay Osborne	1	1	DSQ														0	166
16	(New Zealand) Daniel Udy	Ret	10	4	4	4	4											0	156
17	(New Zealand) Maurice Shapley	11	12	8	11	Ret	DNS											0	140
18	(New Zealand) Andrew Turner	12	11	Ret													7	0	118
19	(New Zealand) Daynom Templeman	4	6	Ret														0	113
20	(New Zealand) John Roberts				14	Ret	10										13	0	93
21	(New Zealand) Brianna Hughes	Ret	14	11	12	Ret	DNS											0	92
22	(Australia) Tyler Cheney																4	0	70
23	(New Zealand) Roger Beuvink																9	0	44
Pos.	Driver	HAM1			HAM2			TER			HIG			MAN			TAU	Pen	Points
