= Classic Endurance Racing =

Sports car racing series in Europe

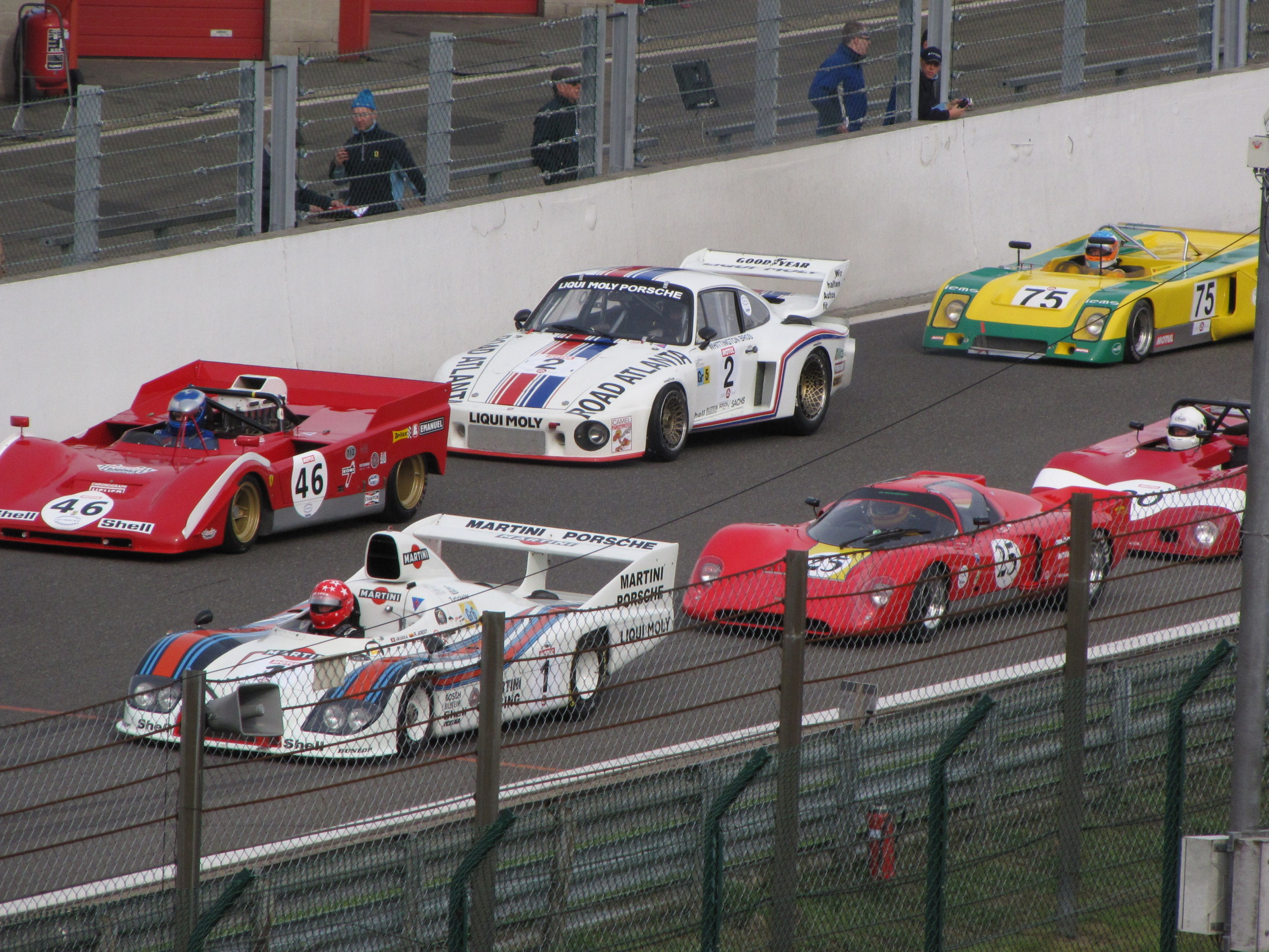

Classic Endurance Racing (commonly abbreviated as CER) is a sports car racing series founded in 2004 by Patrick Peter's Peter Auto Ltd. It features classic sports cars and its aim is to support the endurance racing revival.

== Format ==
The series consists of events in various European countries. Each race is one hour long.

Previously it was a support event for the Le Mans Series. The 2015 season features six standalone rounds:

- Spa Classic – Circuit de Spa-Francorchamps (Belgium)
- Grand Prix de l'Age d'Or – Dijon-Prenois (France)
- Dix Mille Tours – Circuit Paul Ricard (France)
- Monza Historic – Autodromo Nazionale Monza (Italy)
- Vallelunga Classic – ACI Vallelunga Circuit (Italy)
- Algarve Classic Festival – Autodromo Internacional do Algarve (Portugal)

== Regulations ==
All cars are to be manufactured between the years 1966 and 1979. It consists of four classes, Proto 1 and Proto 2, which consist of Group P and S cars with either +2.0L or -2.0L size engine. There are also two grand tourer classes, GT1 and GT2.
