= 2011–12 Suzuki Swift Sport Cup season =

2011–2012 Suzuki Swift Sport Cup

Seasons
- ← 2010–11 2013 →

The 2011–12 Suzuki Swift Sport Cup season was the fifth Suzuki Swift Sport Cup season. The season began at Pukekohe on 4 November 2011 and finished at the Taupō on 11 March 2012 after six rounds. This was the last season before the series shifted from the supporting act for the New Zealand V8s to become the supporting class for the V8SuperTourer Championship for the 2013 Suzuki Swift Sport Cup season.

== Calendar ==
| Rd. | Circuit | Location | Date | Race 1 Winner | Race 2 Winner | Race 3 Winner |
|---|---|---|---|---|---|---|
| 1 | Pukekohe Park Raceway | Auckland | 4–6 November | Mark Gibson | Mark Gibson | Mark Gibson |
| 2 | Powerbuilt Tools Raceway | Christchurch | 9–11 December | AJ Lauder | Sam Barry | Chris Cox |
| 3 | Teretonga Park | Invercargill | 13–15 January | AJ Lauder | Glen Collinson | AJ Lauder |
| 4 | Timaru International Motor Raceway | Timaru | 20–22 January | AJ Lauder | Shaun Lawrence | AJ Lauder |
| 5 | Manfeild Autocourse | Feilding | 10–12 February | Chris Cox | Mark Gibson | Chris Cox |
| 6 | Ricoh Taupo Motorsport Park | Taupō | 9–11 March | AJ Lauder | Mark Gibson | Chris Cox |

== Teams and drivers ==
| Team | No. | Driver | Rounds |
|---|---|---|---|
| GP Team Racing | 8 | (New Zealand) Andrew Vincent | All |
| Castrol EDGE Scholarship | 10 | (New Zealand) Kent Yarrall | All |
| Chris Cox Motorsport | 12 | (New Zealand) Chris Cox | All |
| Shaun Lawrence Racing | 14 | (New Zealand) Shaun Lawrence | All |
| Team Aegis Racing | 15 | (New Zealand) Brad Lauder | All |
| Team Aegis Racing | 87 | (New Zealand) AJ Lauder | All |
| Betta Motorsport | 17 | (New Zealand) Glen Collinson | All |
| Betta Motorsport | 71 | (New Zealand) Sam Barry | All |
| Gibson Motorsport | 34 | (New Zealand) Rob Gibson | All |
| Gibson Motorsport | 35 | (New Zealand) Mark Gibson | All |
| Gibson Motorsport | 36 | (New Zealand) Simon Evans | 1 |
| Gibson Motorsport | 36 | (New Zealand) Craig McRae | 2–4 |
| Gibson Motorsport | 36 | (New Zealand) Hamish Cross | 5 |
| Gibson Motorsport | 88 | (New Zealand) Matt Gibson | 5–6 |
| Shapes Roadies Racing | 41 | (New Zealand) Jamie Gaskin | All |
| Milligans Food Group Racing | 74 | (New Zealand) Joseph Paton | 1–3 |

== Championship results ==
| Pos | Driver | PUK | | | RUA | | | TER | | | TIM | | | MAN | | | TAU | | | Pen. | Pts |
| Pos | Driver | R1 | R2 | R3 | R1 | R2 | R3 | R1 | R2 | R3 | R1 | R2 | R3 | R1 | R2 | R3 | R1 | R2 | R3 | Pen. | Pts |
|---|---|---|---|---|---|---|---|---|---|---|---|---|---|---|---|---|---|---|---|---|---|
| 1 | (New Zealand) AJ Lauder | 2 | 6 | 2 | 1 | 4 | 2 | 1 | 7 | 1 | 1 | 6 | 1 | 4 | DNS | 4 | 1 | 11 | 3 | | 1122 |
| 2 | (New Zealand) Chris Cox | 5 | 8 | 7 | 2 | 3 | 1 | 2 | 4 | 2 | 4 | Ret | DNS | 1 | 10 | 1 | 5 | 8 | 1 | | 1041 |
| 3 | (New Zealand) Mark Gibson | 1 | 1 | 1 | 5 | Ret | 3 | 10 | 6 | 3 | 2 | 2 | Ret | 7 | 1 | 2 | 12 | 1 | 2 | | 1026 |
| 4 | (New Zealand) Kent Yarrall | 8 | 7 | 4 | 8 | 6 | 8 | 4 | 5 | 4 | 7 | 8 | 3 | 5 | 3 | 5 | 8 | 2 | 9 | | 952 |
| 5 | (New Zealand) Shaun Lawrence | 4 | 2 | 3 | 7 | 11 | 4 | 5 | 3 | 11 | 9 | 1 | 6 | 3 | 6 | 7 | 11 | 10 | 12 | | 919 |
| 6 | (New Zealand) Andrew Vincent | 12 | 4 | 9 | 13 | 8 | 11 | 8 | 12 | 6 | 8 | 4 | 2 | 2 | 4 | 13 | 2 | 5 | 4 | | 909 |
| 7 | (New Zealand) Brad Lauder | 10 | 5 | 10 | 12 | 7 | 7 | 3 | 9 | 7 | 11 | 3 | 5 | 8 | 5 | 6 | 3 | 12 | 5 | | 896 |
| 8 | (New Zealand) Jamie Gaskin | 6 | 3 | 8 | 3 | 10 | 5 | 6 | 2 | 5 | 3 | 5 | Ret | 13 | DNS | 10 | 10 | 3 | 7 | | 831 |
| 9 | (New Zealand) Rob Gibson | 7 | 10 | 6 | 9 | 2 | 6 | 11 | 11 | 10 | 10 | 7 | 9 | 6 | 9 | 9 | 4 | 9 | 11 | | 793 |
| 10 | (New Zealand) Sam Barry | 11 | 9 | 12 | 4 | 1 | 12 | 12 | 10 | 8 | 5 | 10 | 4 | 10 | 8 | 12 | 7 | 7 | 6 | | 786 |
| 11 | (New Zealand) Glen Collinson | 9 | 12 | 13 | 6 | 9 | 13 | 9 | 1 | Ret | 6 | Ret | 7 | 11 | 2 | 3 | 6 | 6 | 10 | | 756 |
| 12 | (New Zealand) Craig McRae | | | | 10 | 5 | 9 | 7 | 8 | 9 | 12 | 9 | 8 | | | | | | | | 380 |
| 13 | (New Zealand) Matt Gibson | | | | | | | | | | | | | 9 | 7 | 11 | 9 | 4 | 8 | | 273 |
| 14 | (New Zealand) Joseph Paton | 13 | 13 | 11 | 11 | Ret | 10 | 13 | Ret | DNS | | | | | | | | | | | 197 |
| 15 | (New Zealand) Simon Evans | 3 | 11 | 5 | | | | | | | | | | | | | | | | | 139 |
| 16 | (New Zealand) Hamish Cross | | | | | | | | | | | | | 12 | DNS | 8 | | | | | 69 |
| Pos | Driver | R1 | R2 | R3 | R1 | R2 | R3 | R1 | R2 | R3 | R1 | R2 | R3 | R1 | R2 | R3 | R1 | R2 | R3 | Pen. | Pts |
| Pos | Driver | PUK | | | RUA | | | TER | | | TIM | | | MAN | | | TAU | | | Pen. | Pts |
