= Hampton Downs Motorsport Park =

Motorsport park in New Zealand

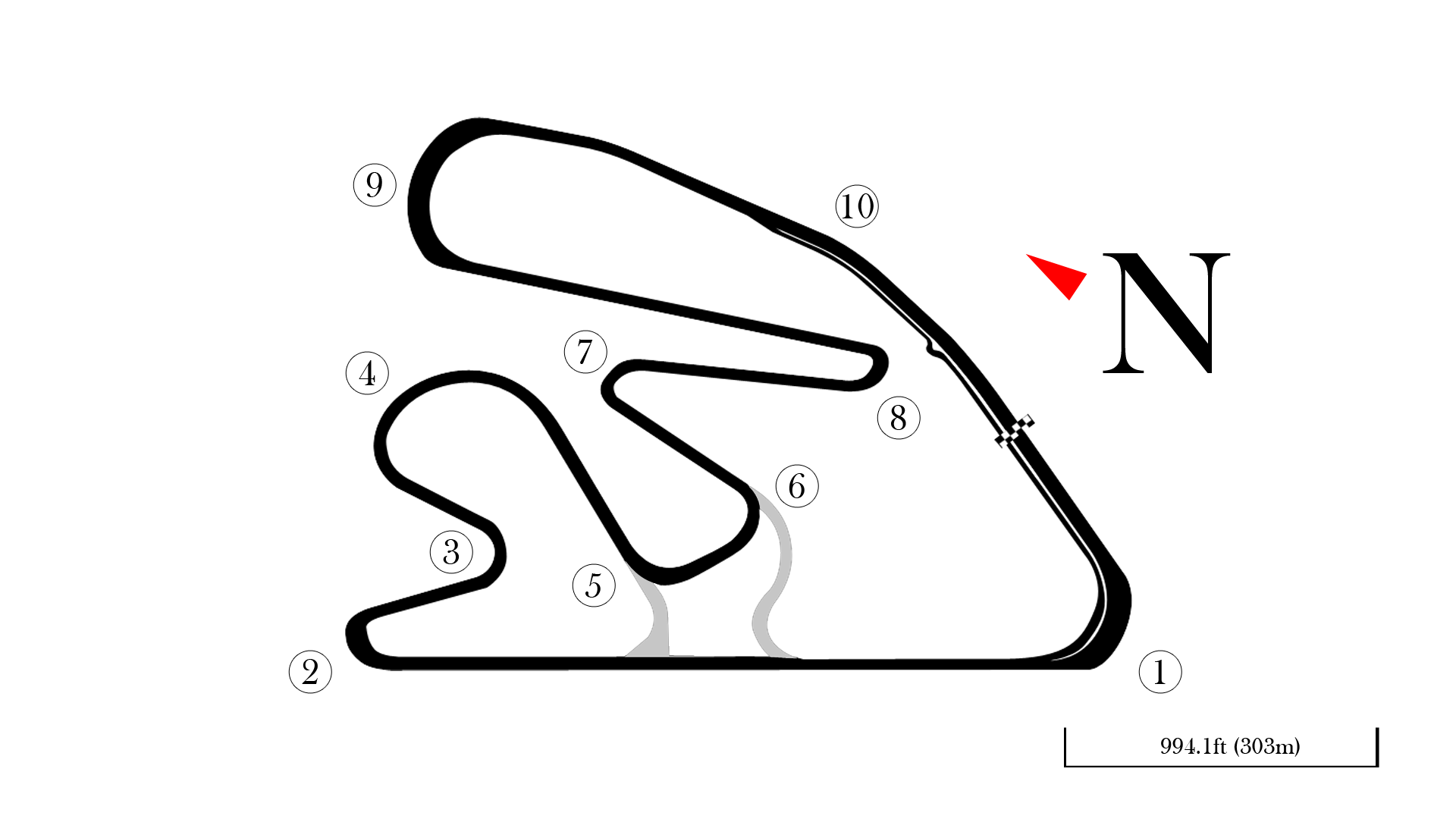
- International Circuit (2016–present)
- Location: North Waikato, New Zealand
- Coordinates: 37°21′14″S 175°4′31″E
- FIA Grade: 3
- Owner: Tony Quinn (2015–present)
- Broke ground: 23 February 2007; 19 years ago
- Opened: 18 October 2009; 17 years ago
- Major events: Current: FR Oceania (2010–2021, 2023–present); GR86 Championship New Zealand (2014–2015, 2017–present); Former: New Zealand Grand Prix (2021, 2023); GT World Challenge Australia (2016–2018, 2025); Ferrari Challenge Asia-Pacific (2018); Super V8 Series (2014–2015, 2017–2019, 2021–2025); V8SuperTourer (2012–2015)
- Website: http://www.hamptondowns.com

International Circuit (2016–present)
- Length: 3.800 km (2.361 mi)
- Turns: 10
- Race lap record: 1:27.637 ( (United Kingdom) Michael Lyons, McLaren M26, 2017, F1)

National Circuit (2009–present)
- Length: 2.700 km (1.678 mi)
- Turns: 7
- Race lap record: 0:59.444 ( (New Zealand) Ken Smith, Lola T332, 2019, F5000)

Club Circuit (2016–present)
- Length: 1.200 km (0.746 mi)
- Turns: 4

The Hampton Downs Motorsport Park is a motorsports racetrack situated near Meremere and Te Kauwhata in Waikato, New Zealand. It is located about halfway between Auckland and Hamilton on the Waikato Expressway, close to the Meremere Dragway, Meremere Dirt Track Club and Meremere Sprint Bowl.

== History ==
The motorsport park is an ambitious privately funded enterprise by two motorsport friends, Tony Roberts and Chris Watson. Roberts and Watson purchased two dairy farms from Envirowaste in December 2003 and began the long task of getting resource consent to build the Motorsport Park. Opposition from Transit NZ and the Corrections Department (their new prison is 2 km away) caused delays due to concerns over traffic, litter and odour, which was ironic with the landfill only 2 km (1.2 mi) away. The concept of apartments on the edge of the circuit was entirely new and untested in the market. Roberts and Watson came up with the concept from observing its success alongside golf courses to help fund the project. It was a major success, with the 80 apartments selling in only 5 weeks in 2006 and returning $26 million to help fund the project. With construction beginning in February 2007. The completion was planned for late 2008, but a particularly wet winter pushed the opening out to October 2009. Some of the circuit was built on swampy ground, and Fraser Thomas Ltd, the engineers on the project utilised modern pre-loading technology to ensure that the land would be stable enough to support a race track. The earthworks were carried out by Ross Reid Ltd, who purchased laser controlled graders to ensure an accurate build of the circuit. In January 2010 Hampton Downs was officially opened by the Waikato District Mayor, Peter Harris, at the Bruce McLaren Festival. This Festival was the first of the very successful Historic Motorsport Festival promoted to celebrate a famous New Zealander, or car marque. Hampton Downs has become a major venue for local motorsport without the restrictions imposed by tracks that share the use with the horse racing fraternity like Pukekohe Park Raceway. It also reflects a modern approach to motor race track design and associated amenities. The 160ha development's initial plans also included an industrial park, events cafe, motor lodge, lifestyle blocks, 80-trackside apartments and convention centre (re-located Britomart Pavilion) and the track is already booked out five days a week for driver training and various industry promotions.

In 2015, Tony Quinn purchased the complex and work started almost immediately to complete the circuit extension, based closely on the original plans. Currently completed are hospitality suites above the pits, a corporate karting circuit, business park, business apartments (with seven-car garages) and cafe. The Bruce McLaren Trust has an industrial unit with a large collection of the famous NZ racing driver and originator of the McLaren F1 team memorabilia, which can be viewed most days.

In 2020, the track would have hosted the Supercars Championship's Auckland Super400 but the lockdown due to COVID-19 curtailed this. Although the event is traditionally held at Pukekohe Park Raceway, the 2020 race was scheduled for Anzac Day (25 April), which is forbidden under local legislation.

== The circuit ==
The track consists of two independent circuits that can be combined to form one large circuit. The direction of the circuits are clockwise. The track has a very smooth surface, and a mix of blind bends and crests which make it a challenging circuit for drivers. The front straight is 950 m (3,120 ft) long with a kink in the middle and has an 11 m (36 ft) rise and fall, and the back straight is 750 m (2,460 ft) long. The National circuit, which incorporates the long front straight and pit facilities, is 2.700 km (1.678 mi) long with seven corners. The club circuit is 1.200 km (0.746 mi) long with four corners. Both tracks can combine into a 3.800 km (2.361 mi) circuit with six right-hand and four left-hand corners.

Hampton Downs Motorsport Park layout history
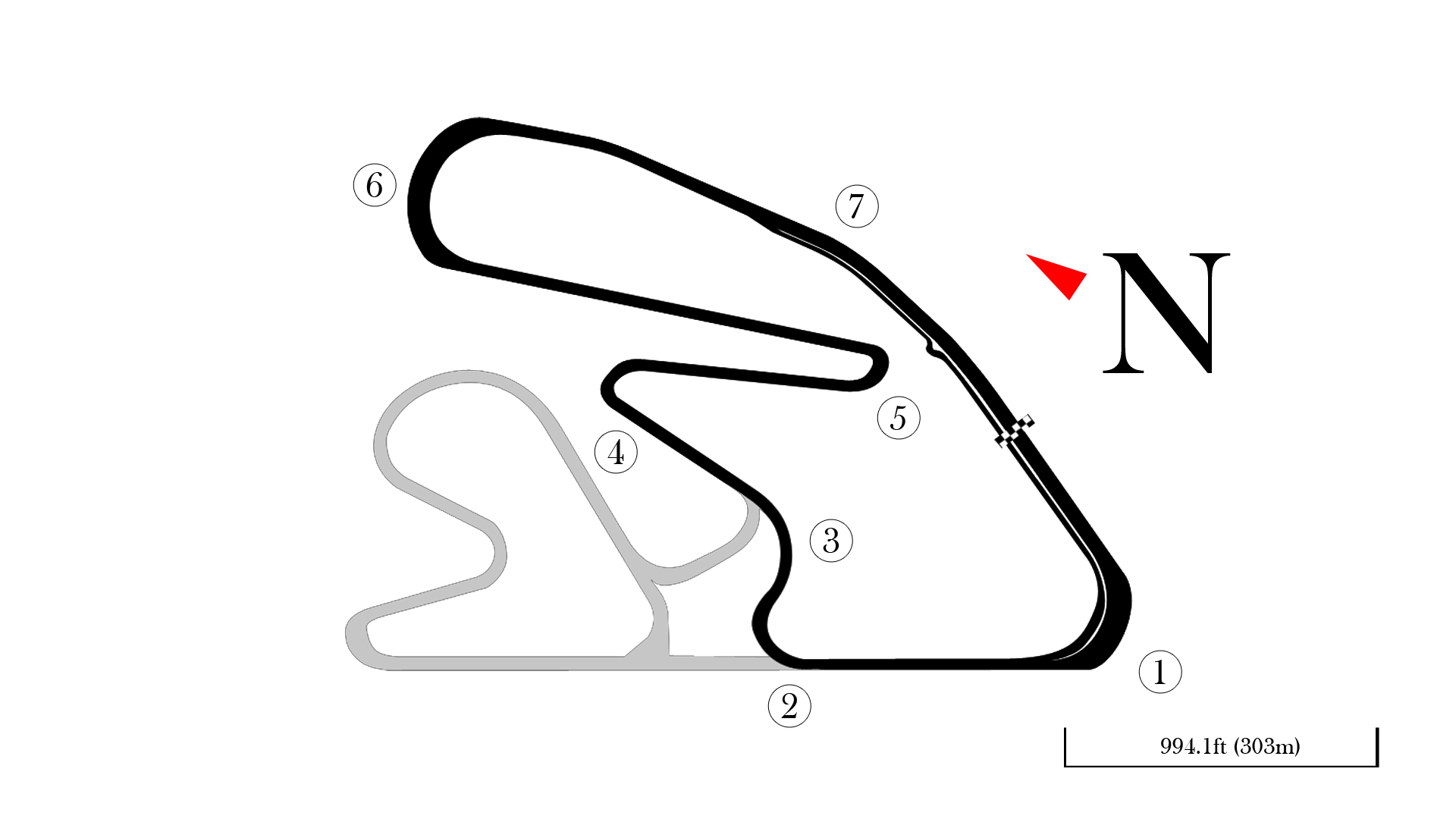
National Circuit (2009–present)

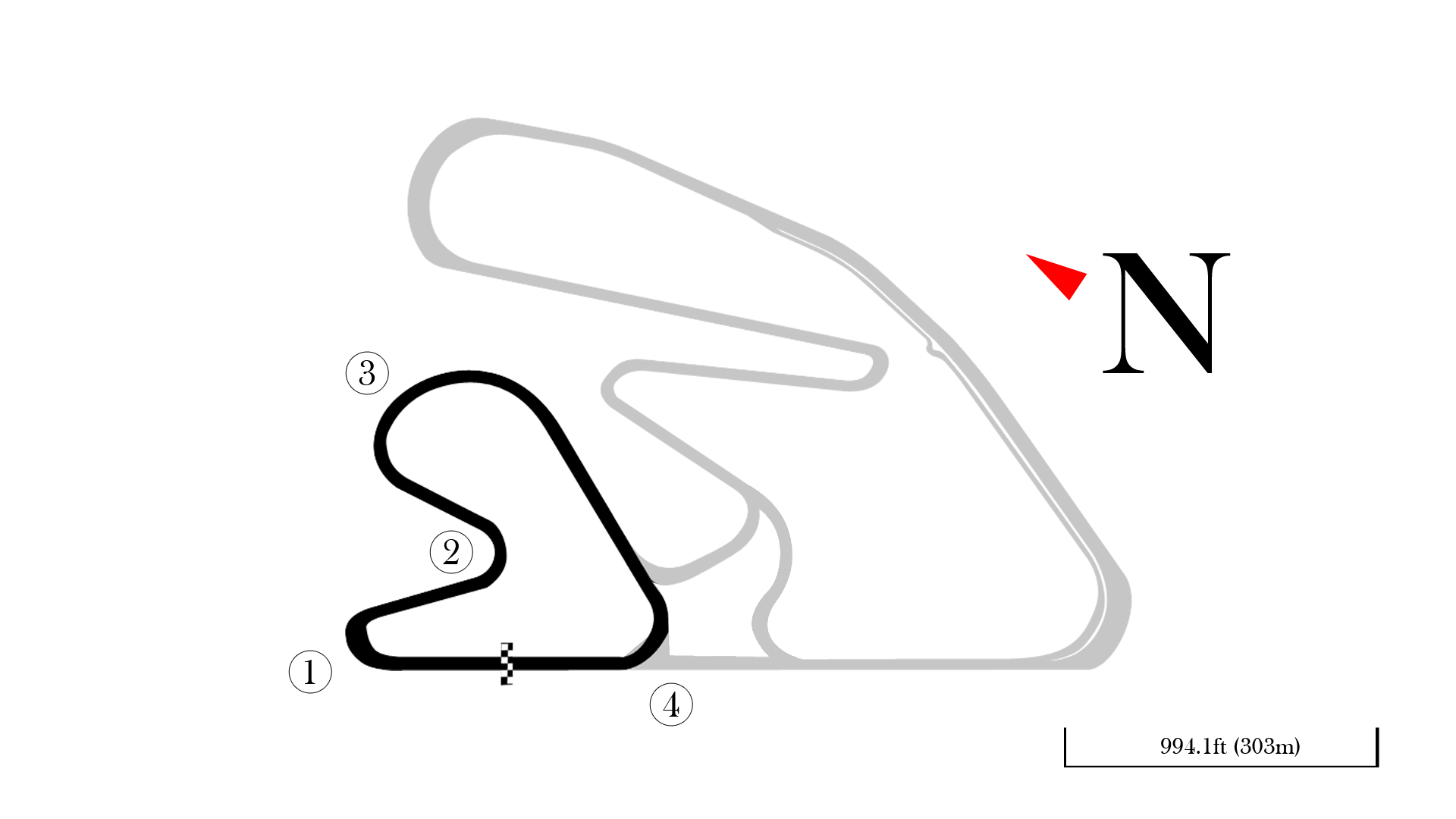
Club Circuit (2016–present)

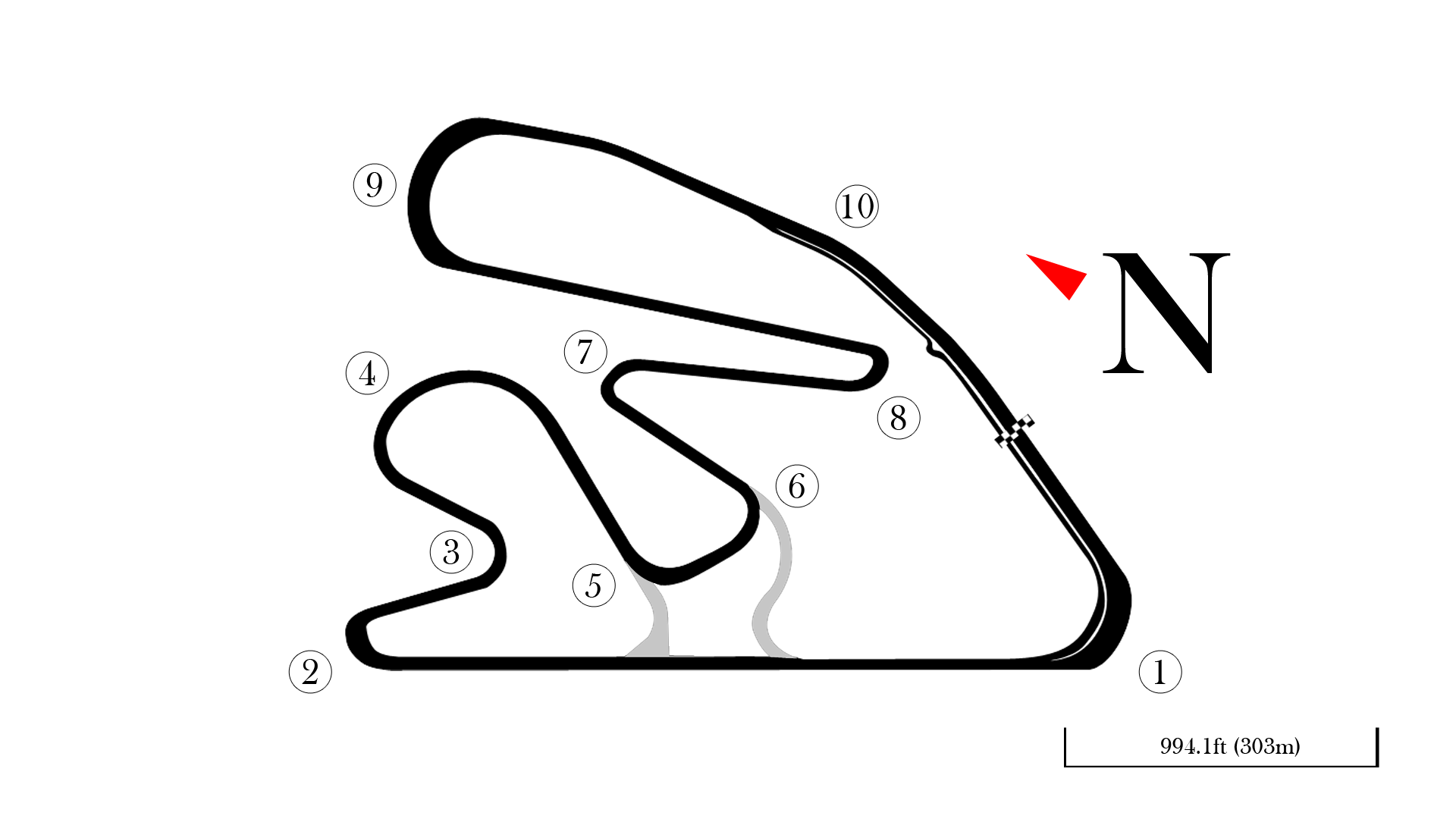
International Circuit (2016–present)

== Accommodation ==
The 450 ha (1,100 acres) includes 80-trackside apartments set in four blocks on the main straight, all of which were sold out within three weeks during September 2004. Many of the apartments are offered to rent as part of a motel and are able to accommodate up to six people.

== Track facilities and specification ==
The track has been designed for FIA Level 3 usage. Apart from racing, there will be an emphasis on the testing and driver training facility. Downforce will run driver training (instructed by A1GP veteran Jonny Reid) and corporate events at Hampton Downs. California Superbike School have signed up and base its New Zealand fleet of Suzuki GSX-R600s at Hampton Downs to deliver professional rider training between-races events at Hampton Downs, as an extension of its worldwide network.

== Virtual models ==
=== Demonstrations ===
The track had been modeled in 3D by Rmedia featuring a BMW Formula One car. Its full simulation also had been analysed by FIA.

=== Games ===
The Hampton Downs circuit was immortalised in the rFactor game by way of third-party generated content based on the early plans made before construction was initially complete. This content is available to download for public use.

== Track events ==
The track has hosted several major events since it opened in 2009. The circuit also hosts a round of the Toyota Racing Series each summer (except 2022), with three races being held during the event and the New Zealand Motor Cup being contested over the final race. The V8SuperTourer series held two yearly events at the circuit from its inception until its demise. The newly formed NZ Touring Car Championship now contests there annually. Many other events are held other the year including national events as well as local events. The circuit also hosts the New Zealand Grand Prix in 2021 and 2023.

It also hosted the 2016 Hampton Downs 101, an endurance race as part of the 2016 Australian GT Championship.

=== Event list ===
Current

- January: Formula Regional Oceania Trophy Repco NextGen NZ Championship Hampton Downs International, Bridgestone GR86 Championship
- March: New Zealand Formula Ford Championship March Madness, Legends of Speed
- May: NZIGP Season Finale

Former

- Ferrari Challenge Asia-Pacific (2018)
- Formula Regional Oceania Championship
  - New Zealand Grand Prix (2021, 2023)
- GT World Challenge Australia (2016–2018, 2025)
- GT4 Australia Series (2025)
- Suzuki Swift Sport Cup (2013)
- V8SuperTourer (2012–2015)

== Lap records ==
As of January 2026, the fastest official race lap records at the Hampton Downs Motorsport Park are listed as:

Category	Time	Driver	Vehicle	Date
International Circuit: 3.800 km (2.361 mi) (2016–present)
Formula One	1:27.637	(United Kingdom) Michael Lyons	McLaren M26	20 January 2017
Formula Regional	1:28.340	(United Kingdom) Arvid Lindblad	Tatuus FT-60	19 January 2025
GT3	1:29.887	(Australia) Broc Feeney	Audi R8 LMS Evo II	2 November 2025
Daytona Prototype (GTRNZ)	1:32.220	(New Zealand) John deVeth	Crawford DP03	23 January 2021
Ferrari Challenge	1:35.467	(Monaco) Louis Prette	Ferrari 488 Challenge	15 April 2018
Porsche Carrera Cup	1:37.014	(New Zealand) Nicholas Cutfield	Porsche 911 (991 I) GT3 Cup	11 January 2026
GT4	1:38.007	(Australia) Jarrod Hughes	Mercedes-AMG GT4	2 November 2025
TA2	1:38.404	(New Zealand) Caleb Byers	Chevrolet Camaro TA2	1 November 2025
GR86 Championship New Zealand	1:49.253	(New Zealand) Chris White	Toyota GR86	2 November 2025
National Circuit: 2.700 km (1.678 mi) (2009–present)
Formula 5000	0:59.444	(New Zealand) Ken Smith	Lola T332	25 January 2019
Toyota Racing Series	0:59.636	(United Kingdom) Enaam Ahmed	Tatuus FT-50	29 January 2017
Daytona Prototype (GTRNZ)	0:59.645	(New Zealand) Glenn Smith	Crawford DP03	11 March 2018
Formula Regional	1:01.280	(New Zealand) Liam Lawson	Tatuus FT-60	1 February 2020
TA2	1:06.479	(New Zealand) Caleb Byers	Chevrolet Camaro TA2	23 November 2025
GR86 Championship New Zealand	1:14.210	(New Zealand) Tom Alexander	Toyota 86	3 May 2014
