= Chris Lange =

New Zealand rally driver

Chris Lange () is a New Zealand local rally driver. He made his debut in 2005 originally driving a 1996 Mitsubishi Mirage in the South Island Rally series winning the 1600cc 2WD class.

In 2007, Lange entered the New Zealand National Championship Rally driving a Ford Fiesta ST in the Vantage Aluminium Joinery 2007 New Zealand Rally Championship in class N3. This was also a part of the International Fiesta Sporting Trophy competition. His 2008 plans included competing in the Fiesta Sporting trophy and the New Zealand Rally Championship again. Malcolm Peden would be co-driving.

== 2007 NZRC results ==
| Round | Rally | Date | Co-driver | Result |
|---|---|---|---|---|
| 1 | Rally of Otago | 13–15 April 2007 | Malcolm Peden | 2nd Fiesta / 16th Overall |
| 2 | Rally of Whangarei (doubles as APRC round) | 11–13 May 2007 | Malcolm Peden | Retired due to Gearbox Failure SS1 |
| 3 | Rally Wairarapa | 2–3 June 2007 | Malcolm Peden | 2nd Fiesta / 11th NZRC Overall |
| 4 | Rally of Hawkes Bay | 4 August 2007 | Malcolm Peden | |
| 5 | Rally New Zealand (doubles as WRC round) | 31 August – 2 September 2007 | Malcolm Peden | 2nd Fiesta / |
| 6 | Rally of Nelson | 30 September 2007 | Malcolm Peden | Retired after clutch failure |
