= Ted Tracey =

New Zealand speedway racing driver

Ted Tracey is a retired Speedway racing driver from New Zealand.

He started racing in 1974 with a Speedway Midget. By the last night of his first season he had made it into the 'A' grade and won a major championship that night. The person who came second to him that night was Barry Butterworth, one of the best drivers New Zealand has produced.

He won the NZ Championship in 1976 - 1977 - 1978 and retired in 1993. During this final season he won a Seventh NZ Championship at Nelson and the 50 lap championship against the visiting American and Australian drivers at Western Springs. He won many championships over the years including 2 world championships, one in Auckland and one in Christchurch.

He traveled to both the US and Australia to race on three occasions.

Ted was known in the later stage of his career as "cyclone" ted tracey
