= Dunedin Street Circuit =

Motorsport street circuit in Dunedin, New Zealand

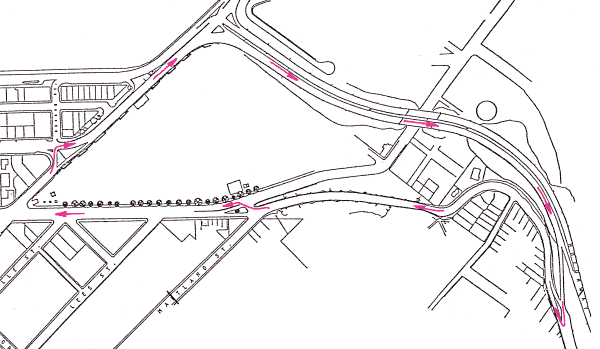
- Location: Dunedin, New Zealand
- Coordinates: 45.889391°S 170.495918°E
- Major events: Southern Festival of Speed
- Length: 2.900 km (1.802 miles)
- Race lap record: 1:24.30 - 123.843 km/h (Ron Wade, Porsche 911 RSR, 24 Feb 2006)

Dunedin Street Circuit is a temporary street circuit for classic and motorsport club racers following some of Dunedin's 1950s street circuit. It is situated at the southern end of Dunedin's city centre, some 1.5 km (0.93 mi) south of The Octagon. Races on the street circuit form one of the main events of Southern Festival of Speed.

The 2.900 km (1.802 mi) circuit is a combination of flat and gently hilly sections, the circuit uses several of Dunedin's main streets, including the Dunedin Southern Motorway extension along the southern edge of the Oval sports grounds and the southern end of Princes Street. The highest point on the circuit is a winding hill section at the southwestern end of the course (shown at the right on the map), which immediately follows a sharp hairpin bend at the end of the motorway extension. This section initially climbs then drops down to a flat section which includes Princes Street and which runs along two sides of the Oval (actually a triangular area of ground), before again meeting the motorway extension.
