= Suzuki Swift Sport Cup =

Motorsport series

- Category: Touring car racing
- Country: New Zealand
- Inaugural season: 2007
- Folded: 2013
- Drivers: 12
- Constructors: Suzuki
- Last Drivers' champion: (New Zealand) Shaun Lawrence

The Suzuki Swift Sport Cup was a one-make racing series in New Zealand. The series was made up of Suzuki Swift's sourced through Winger Motor Group in Hamilton, New Zealand. The series was designed to be an inexpensive way for young drivers to get into tin-top racing. Built on the standard production Suzuki Swift Super 1600 with class rules set by MotorSport New Zealand, the cars were race-modified to set specifications to ensure even competition.

== Previous championship winners ==
The championship first started in 2007/08, when the championship ran alongside the New Zealand Production Championship. In 2009/10, the series became its on championship running separate races from the Production Championship.

In the series' short history, there had only ever been one two-time winner; Cody McMaster in 2007/08 and 2008/09.

Year	Champion	Second	Third
2007–08	Cody McMaster	Brock Barrie	Mark Whyte
2008–09	Cody McMaster	Will Bamber	Ben Dallas
2009–10	Will Bamber	Ben Dallas	Scott Harrison
2010–11	Dane Fisher	AJ Lauder	Mike Turley
2011–12	AJ Lauder	Chris Cox	Mark Gibson
2013	Shaun Lawrence	Josh Drysdale	Sam Barry

== Suzuki Swift Sport Cup graduates ==
Drivers that started on the National Circuit in the Swift Series include:

First year	Driver	Last year	Current Class
2008/09	Will Bamber	2009/10	V8SuperTourer Co-Driver
2008/09	Richard Moore	2008/09	V8SuperTourer Driver
2009/10	Scott Harrison	2009/10	V8SuperTourer Co-Driver
2009/10	Sam Robinson	2009/10	South Island Endurance Championship
2009/10	AJ Lauder	2011/12	New Zealand V8s
2010/11	Mark Gibson	2011/12	V8 Challenge Cup
2010/11	Brad Lauder	2011/12	New Zealand V8s
2010/11	Simon Evans	2011/12	Jaguar I-Pace eTrophy

== V8SuperTourer Support Category ==
In 2013, the championship will move from supporting the New Zealand V8s in the summer, to supporting the V8SuperTourer series in a year-long series. This is to support the development of the young drivers and increase the opportunity for young drivers to reach the top level of motorsport in New Zealand. Drivers who graduate the Swift Cup, can now step into the V8 Challenge Cup to develop their V8 skills before stepping into the V8SuperTourer. Former Swift Cup driver Mark Gibson is currently following this path.

The deal with V8SuperTourer will see the Suzuki's not running on Dunlop tyres for the first time in the series history. They will be changing over to Hankook tyres.
