= Southern Festival of Speed =

The Southern Festival of Speed was a classic and historic racing series held in the South Island in New Zealand. It started in the late 1980s with the revival of the 1950s Dunedin Street Circuit. It comprised rounds at three permanent circuits and one temporary Dunedin circuit. It was organised with assistance from various local car clubs that included the Otago Sports Car Club.

== The Events ==
The 2008 Southern Festival of Speed was New Zealand's Classic Series for classic and historic cars. It was a four venues - seven racing days. The event featured an international set of drivers; the 2002 event had 20 foreign teams from the United States, Hong Kong, Great Britain, and Australia.

The Series is designed for a wide range of classic and historic vehicles, including, motorcycles. It consists of three circuit meetings include a hill climb, various supporting events and functions. It also visits four principal cities in the South Island that includes Christchurch, Timaru, Dunedin, and Invercargill. The following figures indicate the distances coverage and the average time quoted by AA New Zealand. The accompanying map shows the location of each event. Christchurch to Dunedin 395 km/6.25hrs, Christchurch to Timaru is 163 km/1.55hrs, Invercargill to Dunedin 217 km/3.10hrs, and finally Dunedin return to Christchurch via Omarama and Mount Cook Village 662 km/8.80hrs.

=== Bruce Pidgeon Memorial ===
Date: Saturday 9 February to Sunday 10 February 2008.

Location: Timaru International Motor Raceway, Timaru

The circuit's owner, South Canterbury Car Club, ran the event.

=== Skope Motor Racing Classic ===
Date: Saturday 2 February to Sunday 3 February 2008.

Location: Powerbuilt Raceway at Ruapuna Park, Christchurch

The event was run by Mainland Classic Committee, and the two-day event included practicing and racing on Saturday and racing in classes on Sunday. Prizes were given at the track on Saturday, and entries were limited to 200.

=== Leitch Motorsport/Southland Times Speed Fest ===
Date: Saturday 16 February to Sunday 17 February 2008.

Location: Teretonga Park, Invercargill.

== Current ==
2007 incorporated a hill-climb (Three Mile Hill) in the Dunedin event.

Since 2009 the Southern Festival of Speed Dunedin leg is an occasionally run or 1/8 mile sprint.
