= 2017 Teretonga Park TRS round =

Race details
Date	21–22 January 2017
Official name	Teretonga Park TRS round
Location	Teretonga Park, Invercargill
Course	Permanent road course 2.570 km (1.597 mi)
- Overall results

Podium
First	(Netherlands) Richard Verschoor	Giles Motorsport
Second	(Brazil) Pedro Piquet	M2 Competition
Third	(Australia) Thomas Randle	Victory Motor Racing

The 2017 Teretonga Park TRS round was the second round of the 2017 Toyota Racing Series. The event was held at Teretonga Park, in Invercargill, New Zealand from 21 to 22 January 2017.

Richard Verschoor demonstrated a consistent run of form and cruised to overall victory for the weekend, extending his championship lead over the rest of the field.

== Background ==
Rookie Richard Verschoor is the points leader heading into the second round of the Toyota Racing Series, in a demonstration of consistency – which he would later claim to be vital toward winning the championship. Star performances throughout the grid included Marcus Armstrong, who won on his first outing and demonstrated pace throughout the entire weekend, firming his challenge for the title in his rookie year.

== Report ==
=== Practice ===
The first two practice sessions were held on the Thursday and Daruvala once again proved his pace by setting the fastest time in both sessions. The beginning of Friday proved to be treacherous, with damp conditions hampering the session. Richard Verschoor was the fastest in the first free practice of Friday, with a time of 1:00.245. Conditions began to improve in the next session and local racer, Brendon Leitch was the first to break into the 53's, which saw him take the fastest time for free practice four.

Session	Day	Fastest lap			
Session	Day	No.	Driver	Team	Time
Practice 1	Thursday	9	(India) Jehan Daruvala	M2 Competition	0:54.452
Practice 2	Thursday	9	(India) Jehan Daruvala	M2 Competition	0:54.122
Practice 3	Friday	22	(Netherlands) Richard Verschoor	Giles Motorsport	1:00.245
Practice 4	Friday	3	(New Zealand) Brendon Leitch	Victory Motor Racing	0:53.945
Practice 5	Friday	3	(New Zealand) Brendon Leitch	Victory Motor Racing	0:53.401

=== Race 1 ===
==== Qualifying ====
Thomas Randle continued his strong form by taking pole position, with a narrow margin over Richard Verschoor. Leitch acquired third place on the grid.

Pos	No	Driver	Team	Lap	Grid
1	49	(Australia) Thomas Randle	Victory Motor Racing	0:53.758	1
2	22	(Netherlands) Richard Verschoor	Giles Motorsport	0:53.798	2
3	3	(New Zealand) Brendon Leitch	Victory Motor Racing	0:53.812	3
4	5	(Brazil) Pedro Piquet	M2 Competition	0:53.891	4
5	62	(Austria) Ferdinand Habsburg	M2 Competition	0:53.940	5
6	9	(India) Jehan Daruvala	M2 Competition	0:53.961	6
7	8	(New Zealand) Marcus Armstrong	M2 Competition	0:54.106	7
8	65	(United Kingdom) Enaam Ahmed	Giles Motorsport	0:54.170	8
9	26	(Australia) Harry Hayek	Giles Motorsport	0:54.287	9
10	47	(Germany) Keyvan Andres Soori	Giles Motorsport	0:54.306	10
11	12	(Brazil) Christian Hahn	Giles Motorsport	0:54.340	11
12	11	(New Zealand) Taylor Cockerton	MTEC Motorsport	0:54.421	12
13	33	(United States) Kory Enders	MTEC Motorsport	0:54.425	13
14	51	(United States) Shelby Blackstock	Victory Motor Racing	0:54.425	14
15	24	(India) Ameya Vaidyanathan	MTEC Motorsport	0:54.520	15
16	96	(Australia) Luis Leeds	Giles Motorsport	0:54.557	16
17	83	(Canada) Kami Laliberté	M2 Competition	0:54.588	17
18	80	(Russia) Nikita Lastochkin	Victory Motor Racing	0:54.647	18
19	10	(France) Thomas Neubauer	MTEC Motorsport	0:54.706	19
20	27	(France) Jean Baptiste Simmenauer	M2 Competition	0:55.081	20

==== Race ====
After Randle initially took the win, stewards deemed him, as well as Daruvala and Hayek as to have jumped the start. Therefore, a 10-second penalty was applied to these competitors, handing the win over to Richard Verschoor.

Pos	No	Driver	Team	Laps	Time / Retired	Grid
1	22	(Netherlands) Richard Verschoor	Giles Motorsport	15	13min 38.776sec	2
2	3	(New Zealand) Brendon Leitch	Victory Motor Racing	15	+ 1.590 s	3
3	5	(Brazil) Pedro Piquet	M2 Competition	15	+ 4.355 s	4
4	62	(Austria) Ferdinand Habsburg	M2 Competition	15	+ 5.054 s	5
5	65	(United Kingdom) Enaam Ahmed	Giles Motorsport	15	+ 6.317 s	8
6	11	(New Zealand) Taylor Cockerton	MTEC Motorsport	15	+ 9.787 s	12
7	49	(Australia) Thomas Randle	Victory Motor Racing	15	+ 10.000 s	1
8	12	(Brazil) Christian Hahn	Giles Motorsport	15	+ 12.007 s	11
9	9	(India) Jehan Daruvala	M2 Competition	15	+ 18.925 s	6
10	47	(Germany) Keyvan Andres Soori	Giles Motorsport	15	+ 22.504 s	10
11	8	(New Zealand) Marcus Armstrong	M2 Competition	15	+ 22.567 s	7
12	83	(Canada) Kami Laliberté	M2 Competition	15	+ 22.889 s	17
13	26	(Australia) Harry Hayek	Giles Motorsport	15	+ 22.895 s	9
14	51	(United States) Shelby Blackstock	Victory Motor Racing	15	+ 23.773 s	14
15	24	(India) Ameya Vaidyanathan	MTEC Motorsport	15	+ 27.677 s	15
16	96	(Australia) Luis Leeds	Giles Motorsport	15	+ 27.927 s	16
17	80	(Russia) Nikita Lastochkin	Victory Motor Racing	15	+ 28.112 s	18
18	33	(United States) Kory Enders	MTEC Motorsport	15	+ 28.601 s	13
19	27	(France) Jean Baptiste Simmenauer	M2 Competition	15	+ 28.717 s	20
20	10	(France) Thomas Neubauer	MTEC Motorsport	15	+ 28.810 s	19
Fastest Lap: Thomas Randle (Victory Motor Racing) – 0:53.859

=== Race 2 ===
Pos	No	Driver	Team	Laps	Time / Retired	Grid
1	5	(Brazil) Pedro Piquet	M2 Competition	15	18min 08.692sec	2
2	22	(Netherlands) Richard Verschoor	Giles Motorsport	15	+ 0.650 s	3
3	49	(Australia) Thomas Randle	Victory Motor Racing	15	+ 1.075 s	3
4	8	(New Zealand) Marcus Armstrong	M2 Competition	15	+ 3.123 s	3
5	11	(New Zealand) Taylor Cockerton	MTEC Motorsport	15	+ 4.992 s	3
6	83	(Canada) Kami Laliberté	M2 Competition	15	+ 6.930 s	3
7	9	(India) Jehan Daruvala	M2 Competition	15	+ 7.621 s	3
8	47	(Germany) Keyvan Andres Soori	Giles Motorsport	15	+ 11.157 s	3
9	12	(Brazil) Christian Hahn	Giles Motorsport	15	+ 11.268 s	3
10	96	(Australia) Luis Leeds	Giles Motorsport	15	+ 12.488 s	3
11	24	(India) Ameya Vaidyanathan	MTEC Motorsport	15	+ 14.052 s	3
12	51	(United States) Shelby Blackstock	Victory Motor Racing	15	+ 14.873 s	3
13	10	(France) Thomas Neubauer	MTEC Motorsport	15	+ 16.046 s	3
14	80	(Russia) Nikita Lastochkin	Victory Motor Racing	15	+ 17.170 s	3
15	27	(France) Jean Baptiste Simmenauer	M2 Competition	15	+ 18.183 s	3
16	26	(Australia) Harry Hayek	Giles Motorsport	14	+ 1 lap	3
Ret	33	(United States) Kory Enders	MTEC Motorsport	6	Accident	3
Ret	62	(Austria) Ferdinand Habsburg	M2 Competition	0	Collision	3
Ret	3	(New Zealand) Brendon Leitch	Victory Motor Racing	0	Collision	3
Ret	65	(United Kingdom) Enaam Ahmed	Giles Motorsport	0	Collision	3
Fastest Lap: Thomas Randle (Victory Motor Racing) - 0:59.457

=== Race 3 ===
==== Qualifying ====
Local knowledge paid off as Leitch secured pole position for the feature race with tight margins between the top few cars. Randle achieved second and Daruvala was third.

Pos	No	Driver	Team	Lap	Grid
1	3	(New Zealand) Brendon Leitch	Victory Motor Racing	0:53.304	1
2	49	(Australia) Thomas Randle	Victory Motor Racing	0:53.326	2
3	9	(India) Jehan Daruvala	M2 Competition	0:53.334	3
4	62	(Austria) Ferdinand Habsburg	M2 Competition	0:53.374	4
5	22	(Netherlands) Richard Verschoor	Giles Motorsport	0:53.376	5
6	65	(United Kingdom) Enaam Ahmed	Giles Motorsport	0:53.401	6
7	5	(Brazil) Pedro Piquet	M2 Competition	0:53.516	7
8	8	(New Zealand) Marcus Armstrong	M2 Competition	0:53.532	8
9	83	(Canada) Kami Laliberté	M2 Competition	0:53.555	9
10	33	(United States) Kory Enders	MTEC Motorsport	0:53.570	10
11	11	(New Zealand) Taylor Cockerton	MTEC Motorsport	0:53.685	11
12	12	(Brazil) Christian Hahn	Giles Motorsport	0:53.747	12
13	47	(Germany) Keyvan Andres Soori	Giles Motorsport	0:53.837	13
14	51	(United States) Shelby Blackstock	Victory Motor Racing	0:53.852	14
15	80	(Russia) Nikita Lastochkin	Victory Motor Racing	0:53.861	15
16	24	(India) Ameya Vaidyanathan	MTEC Motorsport	0:54.093	16
17	10	(France) Thomas Neubauer	MTEC Motorsport	0:54.224	17
18	27	(France) Jean Baptiste Simmenauer	M2 Competition	0:54.277	18
19	96	(Australia) Luis Leeds	Giles Motorsport	0:55.091	19
–	26	(Australia) Harry Hayek	Giles Motorsport	no time	–

==== Race ====
Pos	No	Driver	Team	Laps	Time / Retired	Grid
1	22	(Netherlands) Richard Verschoor	Giles Motorsport	20	20min 08.692sec	2
2	9	(India) Jehan Daruvala	M2 Competition	20	+ 10.930 s	
3	49	(Australia) Thomas Randle	Victory Motor Racing	20	+ 14.427 s	
4	8	(New Zealand) Marcus Armstrong	M2 Competition	20	+ 14.757 s	
5	5	(Brazil) Pedro Piquet	M2 Competition	20	+ 19.004 s	
6	83	(Canada) Kami Laliberté	M2 Competition	20	+ 20.837 s	
7	3	(New Zealand) Brendon Leitch	Victory Motor Racing	20	+ 21.633 s	
8	65	(United Kingdom) Enaam Ahmed	Giles Motorsport	20	+ 22.643 s	
9	11	(New Zealand) Taylor Cockerton	MTEC Motorsport	20	+ 22.680 s	
10	12	(Brazil) Christian Hahn	Giles Motorsport	20	+ 30.632 s	
11	80	(Russia) Nikita Lastochkin	Victory Motor Racing	20	+ 37.327 s	
12	51	(United States) Shelby Blackstock	Victory Motor Racing	20	+ 37.824 s	
13	10	(France) Thomas Neubauer	MTEC Motorsport	20	+ 38.542 s	
14	96	(Australia) Luis Leeds	Giles Motorsport	20	+ 40.682 s	
15	26	(Australia) Harry Hayek	Giles Motorsport	20	+ 41.885 s	
16	27	(France) Jean Baptiste Simmenauer	M2 Competition	20	+ 44.299 s	
17	47	(Germany) Keyvan Andres Soori	Giles Motorsport	20	+ 45.707 s	
18	62	(Austria) Ferdinand Habsburg	M2 Competition	20	+ 47.111 s	
19	24	(India) Ameya Vaidyanatahan	MTEC Motorsport	20	+ 47.889 s	
20	33	(United States) Kory Enders	MTEC Motorsport	19	+ 1 lap	
Fastest Lap: Richard Verschoor (Giles Motorsport) - 1:00.129

== Championship standings ==
Drivers' Championship standings

Pos.	Driver	Points
1	(Netherlands) Richard Verschoor	398
2	(Australia) Thomas Randle	340
3	(Brazil) Pedro Piquet	307
4	(India) Jehan Daruvala	287
5	(New Zealand) Marcus Armstrong	273

Preceded by 2017 Lady Wigram Trophy	Toyota Racing Series; 2017	Succeeded by 2017 Hampton Downs TRS round
