= 2017 Hampton Downs TRS round =

Race details
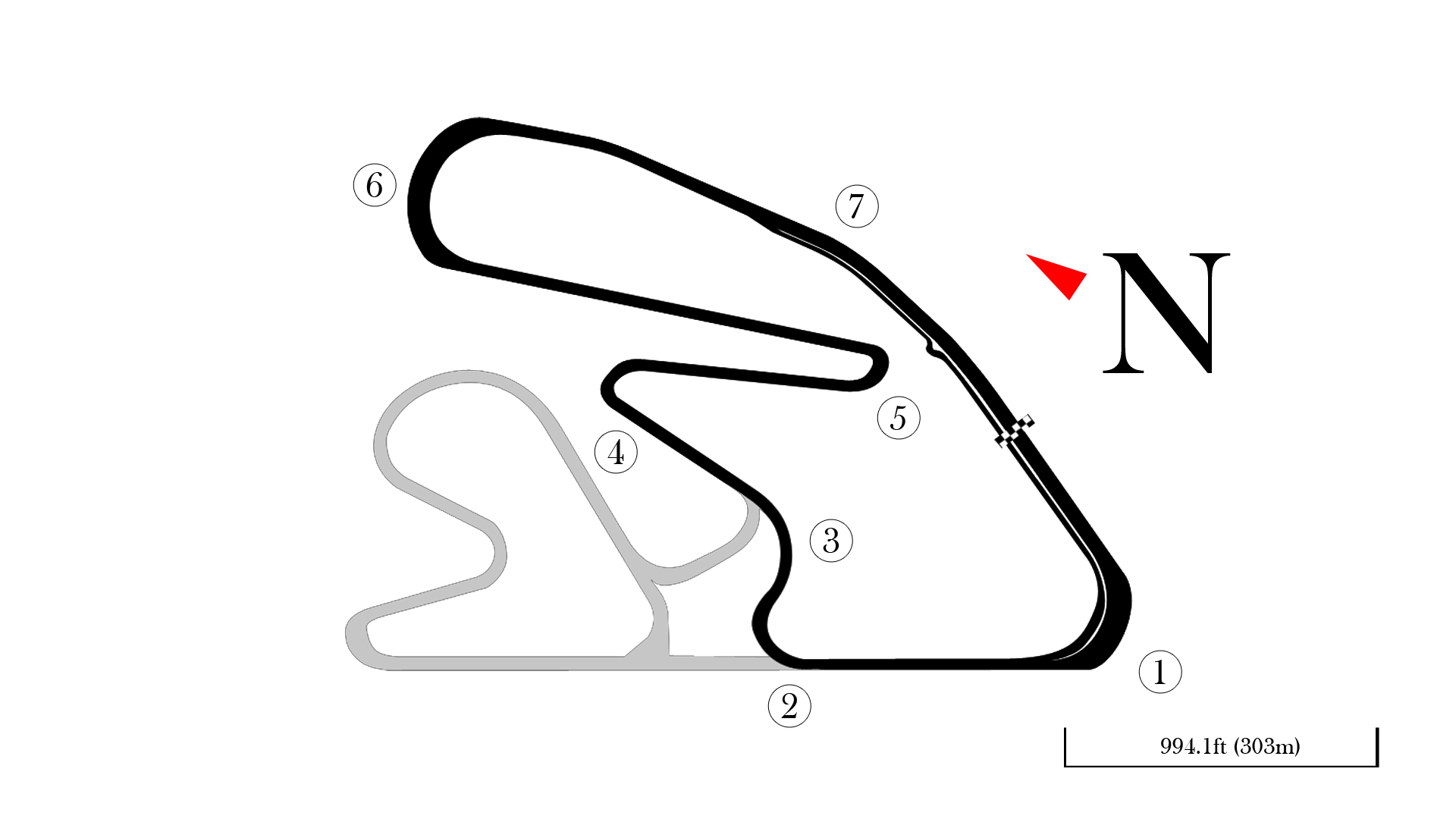
Date	28–29 January 2017
Official name	Hampton Downs TRS round
Location	Hampton Downs Motorsport Park, North Waikato
Course	Permanent road course 2.570 km (1.597 mi)
- Overall results

Podium
First	(Brazil) Pedro Piquet	M2 Competition
Second	(Australia) Thomas Randle	Victory Motor Racing
Third	(United Kingdom) Enaam Ahmed	Giles Motorsport

The 2017 Hampton Downs TRS round was the third round of the 2017 Toyota Racing Series. The event was held at Hampton Downs Motorsport Park, in North Waikato, New Zealand from 28 to 29 January 2017.

== Background ==
Heading into the weekend, Richard Verschoor leads the championship by an extensive margin. Strong, consistent performances from the young Dutchman meant he was the man to beat. Other strong performances in the field included the likes of Thomas Randle, who was a constant front runner in the first two rounds of the championship.

== Report ==
=== Practice ===
Thomas Randle demonstrated his pace early on by taking out four out of the five practice sessions and broke the track record in the process. Pedro Piquet took out the second practice session, narrowly beating out Randle.

Session	Day	Fastest lap			
Session	Day	No.	Driver	Team	Time
Practice 1	Thursday	49	(Australia) Thomas Randle	Victory Motor Racing	1:00.975
Practice 2	Thursday	5	(Brazil) Pedro Piquet	M2 Competition	1:00.561
Practice 3	Friday	49	(Australia) Thomas Randle	Victory Motor Racing	1:00.361
Practice 4	Friday	49	(Australia) Thomas Randle	Victory Motor Racing	1:00.393
Practice 5	Friday	49	(Australia) Thomas Randle	Victory Motor Racing	1:00.109

=== Race 1 ===
==== Qualifying ====
Randle dominated qualifying by taking pole position by nearly two-tenths of a second over Jehan Daruvala. They were followed by Armstrong, Leitch and Piquet.

Pos	No	Driver	Team	Lap	Grid
1	49	(Australia) Thomas Randle	Victory Motor Racing	0:59.636	1
2	9	(India) Jehan Daruvala	M2 Competition	0:59.801	2
3	8	(New Zealand) Marcus Armstrong	M2 Competition	0:59.846	3
4	3	(New Zealand) Brendon Leitch	Victory Motor Racing	0:59.944	4
5	5	(Brazil) Pedro Piquet	M2 Competition	0:59.983	5
6	62	(Austria) Ferdinand Habsburg	M2 Competition	1:00.055	6
7	22	(Netherlands) Richard Verschoor	Giles Motorsport	1:00.147	7
8	83	(Canada) Kami Laliberté	M2 Competition	1:00.164	8
9	65	(United Kingdom) Enaam Ahmed	Giles Motorsport	1:00.284	9
10	26	(Australia) Harry Hayek	Giles Motorsport	1:00.302	10
11	96	(Australia) Luis Leeds	Giles Motorsport	1:00.337	11
12	11	(New Zealand) Taylor Cockerton	MTEC Motorsport	1:00.408	12
13	47	(Germany) Keyvan Andres Soori	Giles Motorsport	1:00.502	13
14	24	(India) Ameya Vaidyanathan	MTEC Motorsport	1:00.532	14
15	12	(Brazil) Christian Hahn	Giles Motorsport	1:00.532	15
16	10	(France) Thomas Neubauer	MTEC Motorsport	1:00.626	16
17	80	(Russia) Nikita Lastochkin	Victory Motor Racing	1:00.634	17
18	51	(United States) Shelby Blackstock	Victory Motor Racing	1:00.684	18
19	33	(United States) Kory Enders	MTEC Motorsport	1:00.726	19
20	27	(France) Jean Baptiste Simmenauer	M2 Competition	1:00.900	20

==== Race ====
After a chaotic start which saw Leitch and Daruvala tumbling down the order, Marcus Armstrong came through to win his second race of the year. An early red flag saw the race restarted with a shortened distance. After losing out the lead,

Pos	No	Driver	Team	Laps	Time / Retired	Grid
1	8	(New Zealand) Marcus Armstrong	M2 Competition	15	16min 34.701sec	3
2	5	(Brazil) Pedro Piquet	M2 Competition	15	+ 0.334 s	5
3	49	(Australia) Thomas Randle	Victory Motor Racing	15	+ 0.677 s	1
4	22	(Netherlands) Richard Verschoor	Giles Motorsport	15	+ 4.457 s	7
5	65	(United Kingdom) Enaam Ahmed	Giles Motorsport	15	+ 4.972 s	9
6	24	(India) Ameya Vaidyanathan	MTEC Motorsport	15	+ 5.756 s	14
7	83	(Canada) Kami Laliberté	M2 Competition	15	+ 8.838 s	8
8	11	(New Zealand) Taylor Cockerton	MTEC Motorsport	15	+ 9.100 s	12
9	62	(Austria) Ferdinand Habsburg	M2 Competition	15	+ 9.500 s	6
10	47	(Germany) Keyvan Andres Soori	Giles Motorsport	15	+ 15.261 s	13
11	51	(United States) Shelby Blackstock	Victory Motor Racing	15	+ 15.537 s	18
12	3	(New Zealand) Brendon Leitch	Victory Motor Racing	15	+ 17.748 s	4
13	96	(Australia) Luis Leeds	Giles Motorsport	15	+ 19.435 s	11
14	9	(India) Jehan Daruvala	M2 Competition	15	+ 19.604 s	2
15	26	(Australia) Harry Hayek	Giles Motorsport	15	+ 24.979 s	10
16	33	(United States) Kory Enders	MTEC Motorsport	15	+ 24.993 s	19
17	27	(France) Jean Baptiste Simmenauer	M2 Competition	15	+ 29.430 s	20
18	12	(Brazil) Christian Hahn	Giles Motorsport	14	+ 1 lap	15
Ret	80	(Russia) Nikita Lastochkin	Victory Motor Racing	0	Retired	17
Ret	10	(France) Thomas Neubauer	MTEC Motorsport	0	Retired	16
Fastest Lap: Thomas Randle (Victory Motor Racing) – 1:00.694

=== Race 2 ===
Pos	No	Driver	Team	Laps	Time / Retired	Grid
1	65	(United Kingdom) Enaam Ahmed	Giles Motorsport	15	16min sec	
2	22	(Netherlands) Richard Verschoor	Giles Motorsport	15	+ 2.436 s	
3	5	(Brazil) Pedro Piquet	M2 Competition	15	+ 3.661 s	
4	8	(New Zealand) Marcus Armstrong	M2 Competition	15	+ 6.128 s	
5	24	(India) Ameya Vaidyanathan	MTEC Motorsport	15	+ 11.686 s	
6	83	(Canada) Kami Laliberté	M2 Competition	15	+ 12.064 s	
7	49	(Australia) Thomas Randle	Victory Motor Racing	15	+ 12.900 s	
8	9	(India) Jehan Daruvala	M2 Competition	15	+ 14.900 s	
9	11	(New Zealand) Taylor Cockerton	MTEC Motorsport	15	+ 16.407 s	
10	62	(Austria) Ferdinand Habsburg	M2 Competition	15	+ 16.493 s	
11	26	(Australia) Harry Hayek	Giles Motorsport	15	+ 17.178 s	
12	47	(Germany) Keyvan Andres Soori	Giles Motorsport	15	+ 23.410 s	
13	51	(United States) Shelby Blackstock	Victory Motor Racing	15	+ 23.710 s	
14	33	(United States) Kory Enders	MTEC Motorsport	15	+ 23.809 s	
15	10	(France) Thomas Neubauer	MTEC Motorsport	15	+ 26.252 s	
16	3	(New Zealand) Brendon Leitch	Victory Motor Racing	15	+ 26.641 s	
17	27	(France) Jean Baptiste Simmenauer	M2 Competition	15	+ 30.953 s	
18	12	(Brazil) Christian Hahn	Giles Motorsport	15	+ 36.576 s	
19	96	(Australia) Luis Leeds	Giles Motorsport	14	+ 1 lap	
Ret	80	(Russia) Nikita Lastochkin	Victory Motor Racing	2	Retired	
Fastest Lap: Enaam Ahmed (Giles Motorsport) – 0:59.636

=== Race 3 ===
==== Qualifying ====
Randle once again snatched pole position, though this time with a narrow margin over Daruvala. They were followed by Piquet, Verschoor and Armstrong.

Pos	No	Driver	Team	Lap	Grid
1	49	(Australia) Thomas Randle	Victory Motor Racing	0:59.333	1
2	9	(India) Jehan Daruvala	M2 Competition	0:59.402	2
3	5	(Brazil) Pedro Piquet	M2 Competition	0:59.467	3
4	22	(Netherlands) Richard Verschoor	Giles Motorsport	0:59.624	4
5	8	(New Zealand) Marcus Armstrong	M2 Competition	0:59.770	5
6	62	(Austria) Ferdinand Habsburg	M2 Competition	0:59.846	6
7	83	(Canada) Kami Laliberté	M2 Competition	0:59.852	7
8	65	(United Kingdom) Enaam Ahmed	Giles Motorsport	0:59.872	8
9	96	(Australia) Luis Leeds	Giles Motorsport	0:59.908	9
10	11	(New Zealand) Taylor Cockerton	MTEC Motorsport	0:59.949	10
11	26	(Australia) Harry Hayek	Giles Motorsport	1:00.064	11
12	24	(India) Ameya Vaidyanathan	MTEC Motorsport	1:00.072	12
13	3	(New Zealand) Brendon Leitch	Victory Motor Racing	1:00.073	13
14	12	(Brazil) Christian Hahn	Giles Motorsport	1:00.085	14
15	47	(Germany) Keyvan Andres Soori	Giles Motorsport	1:00.184	15
16	80	(Russia) Nikita Lastochkin	Victory Motor Racing	1:00.197	16
17	51	(United States) Shelby Blackstock	Victory Motor Racing	1:00.238	17
18	33	(United States) Kory Enders	MTEC Motorsport	1:00.294	18
19	10	(France) Thomas Neubauer	MTEC Motorsport	1:00.325	19
20	27	(France) Jean Baptiste Simmenauer	M2 Competition	1:00.565	20

==== Race ====
After a chaotic start which saw Leitch and Daruvala tumbling down the order, Marcus Armstrong came through to win his second race of the year. An early red flag saw the race restarted with a shortened distance. After losing out the lead,

Pos	No	Driver	Team	Laps	Time / Retired	Grid
1	49	(Australia) Thomas Randle	Victory Motor Racing	20	24min 37.172sec	
2	62	(Austria) Ferdinand Habsburg	M2 Competition	20	+ 3.362 s	
3	9	(India) Jehan Daruvala	M2 Competition	20	+ 4.751 s	
4	83	(Canada) Kami Laliberté	M2 Competition	20	+ 6.154 s	
5	5	(Brazil) Pedro Piquet	M2 Competition	20	+ 7.554 s	
6	96	(Australia) Luis Leeds	Giles Motorsport	20	+ 8.584 s	
7	11	(New Zealand) Taylor Cockerton	MTEC Motorsport	20	+ 10.503 s	
8	26	(Australia) Harry Hayek	Giles Motorsport	20	+ 10.765 s	
9	12	(Brazil) Christian Hahn	Giles Motorsport	20	+ 11.276 s	
10	65	(United Kingdom) Enaam Ahmed	Giles Motorsport	20	+ 11.833 s	
11	80	(Russia) Nikita Lastochkin	Victory Motor Racing	20	+ 12.352 s	
12	22	(Netherlands) Richard Verschoor	Giles Motorsport	20	+ 12.879 s	
13	51	(United States) Shelby Blackstock	Victory Motor Racing	20	+ 14.316 s	
14	47	(Germany) Keyvan Andres Soori	Giles Motorsport	20	+ 14.316 s	
15	10	(France) Thomas Neubauer	MTEC Motorsport	20	+ 19.373 s	
16	27	(France) Jean Baptiste Simmenauer	M2 Competition	20	+ 20.345 s	
17	33	(United States) Kory Enders	MTEC Motorsport	17	+ 3 laps	
18	3	(New Zealand) Brendon Leitch	Victory Motor Racing	15	+ 5 laps	
Ret	8	(New Zealand) Marcus Armstrong	M2 Competition	7	Retired	
Ret	24	(India) Ameya Vaidyanathan	MTEC Motorsport	1	Retired	
Fastest Lap: Thomas Randle (Victory Motor Racing) – 01:00.526

Preceded by 2017 Teretonga Park TRS round	Toyota Racing Series; 2017	Succeeded by 2017 Taupo TRS round
