= 2017 Lady Wigram Trophy =

2017 Lady Wigram Trophy Grand Prix

Race details
- Date: 13-15 January 2017
- Location: Mike Pero Motorsport Park, Christchurch
- Course: Permanent road course
- Course length: 3.330 km (2.069 mi)
- Distance: 20 laps

Fastest lap
Driver	(United Kingdom) Enaam Ahmed	Giles Motorsport
- Time: 1:18.200

Podium
First	(India) Jehan Daruvala	M2 Competition
Second	(New Zealand) Marcus Armstrong	M2 Competition
Third	(Austria) Ferdinand Habsburg	M2 Competition

The 2017 Lady Wigram Trophy was the 56th running of the Lady Wigram Trophy and served as the first round of the 2017 Toyota Racing Series. The event was held at the Mike Pero Motorsport Park, in Christchurch, New Zealand from 13 to 15 January 2017.

The defending Lady Wigram Trophy winner was Force India protégé, Jehan Daruvala. He would repeat his feat by winning the Lady Wigram Trophy for the second year in a row.

== Background ==
The 2017 Toyota Racing Series sees the highest number of returning drivers (Brendon Leitch, Thomas Randle, Pedro Piquet, Jehan Daruvala, Ferdinand Habsburg, Kami Laliberté and Taylor Cockerton) since 2013 with seven.

Defending champion, Lando Norris initially announced intentions to return to the series for 2017 to defend his title. However, he later announced his withdrawal. The vacant seat would be taken by Frenchman, Jean Baptiste Simmenauer.

== Report ==
=== Practice ===
For the first practice session of the weekend, Enaam Ahmed achieved the fastest lap time with a 1:18.200, followed closely by Thomas Randle and Richard Verschoor. The session was relatively clean, with only two spins in the session (Andres and Laliberté). The second practice session was equally as uneventful with Thomas Randle lowering the best time down to a 1:18.147, with the closest two rivals being Shelby Blackstock and Jehan Daruvala. For the third and final practice session, several drivers broke into the 17's, with Taylor Cockerton being the fastest of all with a 1:17.383. He was followed by Thomas Randle and Enaam Ahmed.

Session	Day	Fastest lap			
Session	Day	No.	Driver	Team	Time
Practice 1	Friday	65	(United Kingdom) Enaam Ahmed	Giles Motorsport	1:18.200
Practice 2	Friday	49	(Australia) Thomas Randle	Victory Motor Racing	1:18.147
Practice 3	Friday	11	(New Zealand) Taylor Cockerton	MTEC Motorsport	1:17.383

=== Race 1 ===
==== Qualifying ====
Jehan Daruvala continued his fine form at the Mike Pero Motorsport Park by grabbing the first pole position of the year with a 1:17.424.

Pos	No.	Driver	Team	Time	Grid
1	9	(India) Jehan Daruvala	M2 Competition	1:17.424	1
2	8	(New Zealand) Marcus Armstrong	M2 Competition	1:17.582	2
3	62	(Austria) Ferdinand Habsburg	M2 Competition	1:17.641	3
4	22	(Netherlands) Richard Verschoor	Giles Motorsport	1:17.648	4
5	49	(Australia) Thomas Randle	Victory Motor Racing	1:17.665	5
6	11	(New Zealand) Taylor Cockerton	MTEC Motorsport	1:17.797	6
7	5	(Brazil) Pedro Piquet	M2 Competition	1:17.832	7
8	65	(United Kingdom) Enaam Ahmed	Giles Motorsport	1:17.871	8
9	47	(Germany) Keyvan Andres Soori	Giles Motorsport	1:18.179	9
10	24	(India) Ameya Vaidyanathan	MTEC Motorsport	1:18.319	10
11	83	(Canada) Kami Laliberté	M2 Competition	1:18.331	11
12	51	(United States) Shelby Blackstock	Victory Motor Racing	1:18.366	12
13	3	(New Zealand) Brendon Leitch	Victory Motor Racing	1:18.440	13
14	33	(United States) Kory Enders	MTEC Motorsport	1:18.441	14
15	26	(Australia) Harry Hayek	Giles Motorsport	1:18.467	15
16	96	(Australia) Luis Leeds	Giles Motorsport	1:18.474	16
17	12	(Brazil) Christian Hahn	Giles Motorsport	1:18.613	17
18	10	(France) Thomas Neubauer	MTEC Motorsport	1:18.932	18
19	80	(Russia) Nikita Lastochkin	M2 Competition	1:19.013	19
20	27	(France) Jean Baptiste Simmenauer	M2 Competition	1:19.485	20

==== Race ====
After a great start from Daruvala, a safety car caused by Enders stranded car closed the field up once again. On the restart, Armstrong got onto the gearbox of Daruvala, and committed to a brave move around the outside to take the lead and ultimately the win.

Pos	No.	Driver	Team	Laps	Time / Retired	Grid
1	8	(New Zealand) Marcus Armstrong	M2 Competition	15	22min 12.255sec	2
2	9	(India) Jehan Daruvala	M2 Competition	15	+ 0.851 s	1
3	22	(Netherlands) Richard Verschoor	Giles Motorsport	15	+ 1.921 s	4
4	49	(Australia) Thomas Randle	Victory Motor Racing	15	+ 2.512 s	5
5	11	(New Zealand) Taylor Cockerton	MTEC Motorsport	15	+ 5.398 s	6
6	5	(Brazil) Pedro Piquet	M2 Competition	15	+ 6.059 s	7
7	62	(Austria) Ferdinand Habsburg	M2 Competition	15	+ 6.416 s	3
8	65	(United Kingdom) Enaam Ahmed	Giles Motorsport	15	+ 7.898 s	8
9	3	(New Zealand) Brendon Leitch	Victory Motor Racing	15	+ 9.056 s	13
10	83	(Canada) Kami Laliberté	M2 Competition	15	+ 10.055 s	11
11	51	(United States) Shelby Blackstock	Victory Motor Racing	15	+ 11.637 s	12
12	47	(Germany) Keyvan Andres Soori	Giles Motorsport	15	+ 13.232 s	9
13	24	(India) Ameya Vaidyanathan	MTEC Motorsport	15	+ 17.042 s	10
14	26	(Australia) Harry Hayek	Giles Motorsport	15	+ 17.388 s	15
15	96	(Australia) Luis Leeds	Giles Motorsport	15	+ 18.025 s	16
16	10	(France) Thomas Neubauer	MTEC Motorsport	15	+ 18.414 s	18
17	12	(Brazil) Christian Hahn	Giles Motorsport	15	+ 19.324 s	17
18	27	(France) Jean Baptiste Simmenauer	M2 Competition	15	+ 35.660 s	20
19	33	(United States) Kory Enders	MTEC Motorsport	14	+ 1 lap	14
Ret	80	(Russia) Nikita Lastochkin	Victory Motor Racing	7	Retired	19
Fastest lap: Richard Verschoor (Giles Motorsport) - 1:18.237

=== Race 2 ===
In the reverse grid race, Thomas Randle took his first Toyota Racing Series win, followed by Verschoor and Armstrong. When crossing the line Taylor Cockerton was first, followed by Piquet and Randle. Cockerton and Piquet got a time penalty and therefore dropped in the race result.

Pos	No.	Driver	Team	Laps	Time / Retired	Grid
1	49	(Australia) Thomas Randle	Victory Motor Racing	15	19min 54.937sec	3
2	22	(Netherlands) Richard Verschoor	Giles Motorsport	15	+ 6.119 s	4
3	8	(New Zealand) Marcus Armstrong	M2 Competition	15	+ 7.627 s	6
4	11	(New Zealand) Taylor Cockerton	MTEC Motorsport	15	+ 10.000 s	2
5	62	(Austria) Ferdinand Habsburg	M2 Competition	15	+ 11.636 s	7
6	3	(New Zealand) Brendon Leitch	Victory Motor Racing	15	+ 12.456 s	9
7	51	(United States) Shelby Blackstock	Victory Motor Racing	15	+ 18.548 s	11
8	83	(Canada) Kami Laliberté	M2 Competition	15	+ 19.032 s	10
9	26	(Australia) Harry Hayek	Giles Motorsport	15	+ 19.325 s	14
10	47	(Germany) Keyvan Andres Soori	Giles Motorsport	15	+ 23.841 s	12
11	96	(Australia) Luis Leeds	Giles Motorsport	15	+ 23.874 s	15
12	65	(United Kingdom) Enaam Ahmed	Giles Motorsport	15	+ 24.507 s	8
13	33	(United States) Kory Enders	MTEC Motorsport	15	+ 25.290 s	19
14	24	(India) Ameya Vaidyanathan	MTEC Motorsport	15	+ 26.073 s	13
15	80	(Russia) Nikita Lastochkin	Victory Motor Racing	15	+ 29.466 s	20
16	10	(France) Thomas Neubauer	MTEC Motorsport	15	+ 29.681 s	16
17	5	(Brazil) Pedro Piquet	M2 Competition	15	+ 30.000 s	1
18	27	(France) Jean Baptiste Simmenauer	M2 Competition	15	+ 30.339 s	18
19	12	(Brazil) Christian Hahn	Giles Motorsport	15	+ 30.784 s	17
20	9	(India) Jehan Daruvala	M2 Competition	13	+ 2 laps	5
Fastest lap: Taylor Cockerton (MTEC Motorsport) - 1:18.673

=== Race 3 ===
==== Qualifying ====
Daruvala once again took the pole with a tight margin over Armstrong and Ahmed.

Pos	No.	Driver	Team	Time	Grid
1	9	(India) Jehan Daruvala	M2 Competition	1:16.800	1
2	8	(New Zealand) Marcus Armstrong	M2 Competition	1:16.801	2
3	65	(United Kingdom) Enaam Ahmed	Giles Motorsport	1:16.866	3
4	5	(Brazil) Pedro Piquet	M2 Competition	1:17.067	4
5	11	(New Zealand) Taylor Cockerton	MTEC Motorsport	1:17.070	5
6	22	(Netherlands) Richard Verschoor	Giles Motorsport	1:17.072	6
7	49	(Australia) Thomas Randle	Victory Motor Racing	1:17.164	7
8	62	(Austria) Ferdinand Habsburg	M2 Competition	1:17.471	8
9	47	(Germany) Keyvan Andres Soori	Giles Motorsport	1:17.536	9
10	3	(New Zealand) Brendon Leitch	Victory Motor Racing	1:17.549	10
11	51	(United States) Shelby Blackstock	Victory Motor Racing	1:17.614	11
12	83	(Canada) Kami Laliberté	M2 Competition	1:17.638	12
13	33	(United States) Kory Enders	MTEC Motorsport	1:17.669	13
14	26	(Australia) Harry Hayek	Giles Motorsport	1:17.685	14
15	96	(Australia) Luis Leeds	Giles Motorsport	1:17.707	15
16	80	(Russia) Nikita Lastochkin	Victory Motor Racing	1:18.014	16
17	10	(France) Thomas Neubauer	MTEC Motorsport	1:18.021	17
18	12	(Brazil) Christian Hahn	Giles Motorsport	1:18.023	18
19	24	(India) Ameya Vaidyanathan	MTEC Motorsport	1:18.164	19
20	27	(France) Jean Baptiste Simmenauer	M2 Competition	1:19.038	20

==== Race ====
In what was an incident-marred race, Daruvala took his second consecutive Lady Wigram Trophy with Ahmed and Piquet rounding out the podium.

Pos	No.	Driver	Team	Laps	Time / Retired	Grid
1	9	(India) Jehan Daruvala	M2 Competition	20	37min 01.402sec	1
2	65	(United Kingdom) Enaam Ahmed	Giles Motorsport	20	+ 0.915 s	3
3	5	(Brazil) Pedro Piquet	M2 Competition	20	+ 1.401 s	4
4	22	(Netherlands) Richard Verschoor	Giles Motorsport	20	+ 1.703 s	6
5	49	(Australia) Thomas Randle	Victory Motor Racing	20	+ 2.124 s	7
6	62	(Austria) Ferdinand Habsburg	M2 Competition	20	+ 2.694 s	8
7	3	(New Zealand) Brendon Leitch	Victory Motor Racing	20	+ 2.926 s	10
8	12	(Brazil) Christian Hahn	Giles Motorsport	20	+ 3.168 s	18
9	33	(United States) Kory Enders	MTEC Motorsport	20	+ 4.181 s	13
10	26	(Australia) Harry Hayek	Giles Motorsport	20	+ 5.045 s	14
11	83	(Canada) Kami Laliberté	M2 Competition	20	+ 5.923 s	12
12	11	(New Zealand) Taylor Cockerton	MTEC Motorsport	20	+ 8.145 s	5
13	96	(Australia) Luis Leeds	Giles Motorsport	20	+ 9.648 s	15
14	10	(France) Thomas Neubauer	MTEC Motorsport	20	+ 13.926 s	17
15	51	(United States) Shelby Blackstock	Victory Motor Racing	18	+ 2 laps	11
Ret	8	(New Zealand) Marcus Armstrong	M2 Competition	16	Suspension	2
Ret	24	(India) Ameya Vaidyanatahan	MTEC Motorsport	11	Retired	19
Ret	27	(France) Jean Baptiste Simmenauer	M2 Competition	11	Spun off	20
Ret	47	(Germany) Keyvan Andres Soori	Giles Motorsport	10	Spun off	9
Ret	80	(Russia) Nikita Lastochkin	Victory Motor Racing	8	Spun off	16
Fastest lap: Jehan Daruvala (M2 Competition) - 1:19.499

== Championship standings ==
Drivers' Championship standings

Pos.	Driver	Points
1	(Netherlands) Richard Verschoor	181
2	(Australia) Thomas Randle	178
3	(India) Jehan Daruvala	142
4	(Austria) Ferdinand Habsburg	136
5	(New Zealand) Marcus Armstrong	135
