= 2017 Toyota Racing Series =

Motor racing competition

The 2017 Castrol Toyota Racing Series was the thirteenth running of the Toyota Racing Series, the premier open-wheel motorsport category held in New Zealand. The series consisted of fifteen races at five meetings. It began on 14 January at Ruapuna Park in Christchurch, and concluded on 12 February with the 62nd running of the New Zealand Grand Prix, at Circuit Chris Amon in Feilding. Lando Norris was the defending drivers' champion but decided not to compete, concentrating on his European Formula Three campaign, whilst M2 Competition were the defending teams champions.

Thomas Randle became the first Australian to win the Toyota Racing Series when he clinched the title by five points over Pedro Piquet. In third place overall and the best-placed rookie was Red Bull Junior driver, Richard Verschoor, who led most of the championship through strong, consistent performances. The best-placed Kiwi would be rookie and Ferrari Driver Academy driver, Marcus Armstrong; beating out his other countrymen - Taylor Cockerton and Brendon Leitch.

== Teams and drivers ==
A new team, MTEC Motorsport made their debut this season. In December 2016, the grid was finalized as follows:

Team	No.	Driver	Status	Rounds
Victory Motor Racing	3	(New Zealand) Brendon Leitch		All
Victory Motor Racing	49	(Australia) Thomas Randle		All
Victory Motor Racing	51	(United States) Shelby Blackstock	R	All
Victory Motor Racing	80	(Russia) Nikita Lastochkin	R	All
M2 Competition	5	(Brazil) Pedro Piquet		All
M2 Competition	8	(New Zealand) Marcus Armstrong	R	All
M2 Competition	9	(India) Jehan Daruvala		All
M2 Competition	27	(France) Jean Baptiste Simmenauer	R	All
M2 Competition	62	(Austria) Ferdinand Habsburg		All
M2 Competition	83	(Canada) Kami Laliberté		All
MTEC Motorsport	10	(France) Thomas Neubauer	R	All
MTEC Motorsport	11	(New Zealand) Taylor Cockerton		All
MTEC Motorsport	24	(India) Ameya Vaidyanathan	R	All
MTEC Motorsport	33	(United States) Kory Enders	R	All
Giles Motorsport	12	(Brazil) Christian Hahn	R	All
Giles Motorsport	22	(Netherlands) Richard Verschoor	R	All
Giles Motorsport	26	(Australia) Harry Hayek	R	All
Giles Motorsport	47	(Germany) Keyvan Andres Soori	R	All
Giles Motorsport	65	(United Kingdom) Enaam Ahmed	R	All
Giles Motorsport	96	(Australia) Luis Leeds	R	All

== Race calendar and results ==
The calendar for the series was announced on 12 July 2016, and was held over five successive weekends in January and February.

Round		Date	Circuit	Pole position	Fastest lap	Winning driver	Winning team	Round winner(s)	Report
1	R1	14 January	Mike Pero Motorsport Park, Christchurch	(India) Jehan Daruvala	(Netherlands) Richard Verschoor	(New Zealand) Marcus Armstrong	M2 Competition	(Netherlands) Richard Verschoor	Report
1	R2	15 January	Mike Pero Motorsport Park, Christchurch		(New Zealand) Taylor Cockerton	(Australia) Thomas Randle	Victory Motor Racing	(Netherlands) Richard Verschoor	Report
1	R3	15 January	Mike Pero Motorsport Park, Christchurch	(India) Jehan Daruvala	(India) Jehan Daruvala	(India) Jehan Daruvala	M2 Competition	(Netherlands) Richard Verschoor	Report
2	R1	21 January	Teretonga Park, Invercargill	(Australia) Thomas Randle	(Australia) Thomas Randle	(Netherlands) Richard Verschoor	Giles Motorsport	(Netherlands) Richard Verschoor	Report
2	R2	22 January	Teretonga Park, Invercargill		(Australia) Thomas Randle	(Brazil) Pedro Piquet	M2 Competition	(Netherlands) Richard Verschoor	Report
2	R3	22 January	Teretonga Park, Invercargill	(New Zealand) Brendon Leitch	(Netherlands) Richard Verschoor	(Netherlands) Richard Verschoor	Giles Motorsport	(Netherlands) Richard Verschoor	Report
3	R1	28 January	Hampton Downs Motorsport Park, Waikato	(Australia) Thomas Randle	(Australia) Thomas Randle	(New Zealand) Marcus Armstrong	M2 Competition	(Brazil) Pedro Piquet	Report
3	R2	29 January	Hampton Downs Motorsport Park, Waikato		(United Kingdom) Enaam Ahmed	(United Kingdom) Enaam Ahmed	Giles Motorsport	(Brazil) Pedro Piquet	Report
3	R3	29 January	Hampton Downs Motorsport Park, Waikato	(Australia) Thomas Randle	(Australia) Thomas Randle	(Australia) Thomas Randle	Victory Motor Racing	(Brazil) Pedro Piquet	Report
4	R1	4 February	Bruce McLaren Motorsport Park, Taupō	(New Zealand) Marcus Armstrong	(New Zealand) Brendon Leitch	(New Zealand) Brendon Leitch	Victory Motor Racing	(New Zealand) Marcus Armstrong	Report
4	R2	5 February	Bruce McLaren Motorsport Park, Taupō		(New Zealand) Taylor Cockerton	(Brazil) Pedro Piquet	M2 Competition	(New Zealand) Marcus Armstrong	Report
4	R3	5 February	Bruce McLaren Motorsport Park, Taupō	(India) Jehan Daruvala	(India) Jehan Daruvala	(New Zealand) Marcus Armstrong	M2 Competition	(New Zealand) Marcus Armstrong	Report
5	R1	11 February	Circuit Chris Amon, Feilding	(India) Jehan Daruvala	(Australia) Thomas Randle	(Brazil) Pedro Piquet	M2 Competition	(New Zealand) Marcus Armstrong	Report
5	R2	12 February	Circuit Chris Amon, Feilding		(Australia) Thomas Randle	(Netherlands) Richard Verschoor	Giles Motorsport	(New Zealand) Marcus Armstrong	Report
5	R3	12 February	Circuit Chris Amon, Feilding	(India) Jehan Daruvala	(Australia) Thomas Randle	(India) Jehan Daruvala	M2 Competition	(New Zealand) Marcus Armstrong	Report

== Championship standings ==
In order for a driver to score championship points, they have to complete at least 75% of the race winner's distance, and be running at the race's completion. All races counted towards the final championship standings.

Scoring system

Position	1st	2nd	3rd	4th	5th	6th	7th	8th	9th	10th	11th	12th	13th	14th	15th	16th	17th	18th	19th	20th
Points	75	67	60	54	49	45	42	39	36	33	30	28	26	24	22	20	18	16	14	12

=== Drivers' championship ===
Pos.	Driver	RUA			TER			HMP			TAU			MAN			Points
1	(Australia) Thomas Randle	4	1	5	**7**	3	3	**3**	7	**1**	4	2	4	5	4	3	855
2	(Brazil) Pedro Piquet	6	17	3	3	1	5	2	3	4	5	1	5	1	3	4	850
3	(Netherlands) Richard Verschoor	3	2	4	1	2	1	4	2	16	8	6	7	4	1	5	843
4	(New Zealand) Marcus Armstrong	1	3	Ret	11	4	4	1	4	Ret	**2**	4	1	3	2	2	792
5	(India) Jehan Daruvala	**2**	Ret	**1**	9	7	2	14	8	3	3	3	**2**	**2**	7	**1**	781
6	(United Kingdom) Enaam Ahmed	8	12	2	5	Ret	8	5	1	9	7	7	11	6	Ret	6	586
7	(New Zealand) Taylor Cockerton	5	4	11	6	5	9	8	9	6	Ret	15	6	7	6	10	574
8	(Austria) Ferdinand Habsburg	7	5	6	4	Ret	18	9	10	2	18	16	3	8	5	7	552
9	(New Zealand) Brendon Leitch	9	6	7	2	Ret	**7**	12	15	17	1	5	8	Ret	8	Ret	502
10	(Canada) Kami Laliberté	10	8	10	12	6	6	7	6	15	6	11	9	13	Ret	13	498
11	(Germany) Keyvan Andres Soori	12	10	Ret	10	8	17	10	12	12	10	10	13	18	10	8	423
12	(United States) Shelby Blackstock	11	7	15	14	12	12	11	13	11	14	14	17	10	11	12	421
13	(Australia) Luis Leeds	15	11	13	16	10	14	13	19	5	9	8	12	9	9	Ret	419
14	(Brazil) Christian Hahn	17	16	8	8	9	10	18	18	8	15	12	15	11	16	Ret	372
15	(Australia) Harry Hayek	14	9	12	13	16	15	15	11	7	13	Ret	10	Ret	17	9	363
16	(India) Ameya Vaidyanathan	13	14	Ret	15	11	19	6	5	Ret	12	17	14	14	14	11	358
17	(France) Thomas Neubauer	16	18	14	20	13	13	Ret	14	13	11	9	18	16	15	14	308
18	(Russia) Nikita Lastochkin	Ret	15	Ret	17	14	11	Ret	Ret	10	16	13	16	17	12	16	263
19	(France) Jean-Baptiste Simmenauer	18	19	Ret	19	15	16	17	16	14	17	Ret	19	15	13	17	248
20	(United States) Kory Enders	19	13	9	18	Ret	20	16	17	Ret	Ret	Ret	Ret	12	Ret	15	192
Pos.	Driver	RUA			TER			HMP			TAU			MAN			Points

Colour	Result
Gold	Winner
Silver	Second place
Bronze	Third place
Green	Points classification
Blue	Non-points classification
Blue	Non-classified finish (NC)
Purple	Retired, not classified (Ret)
Red	Did not qualify (DNQ)
Red	Did not pre-qualify (DNPQ)
Black	Disqualified (DSQ)
White	Did not start (DNS)
White	Withdrew (WD)
White	Race cancelled (C)
Blank	Did not practice (DNP)
Blank	Did not arrive (DNA)
Blank	Excluded (EX)

**Bold** – Pole
Italics – Fastest Lap

Rookie
