= Keyvan Andres =

German-Iranian racing driver

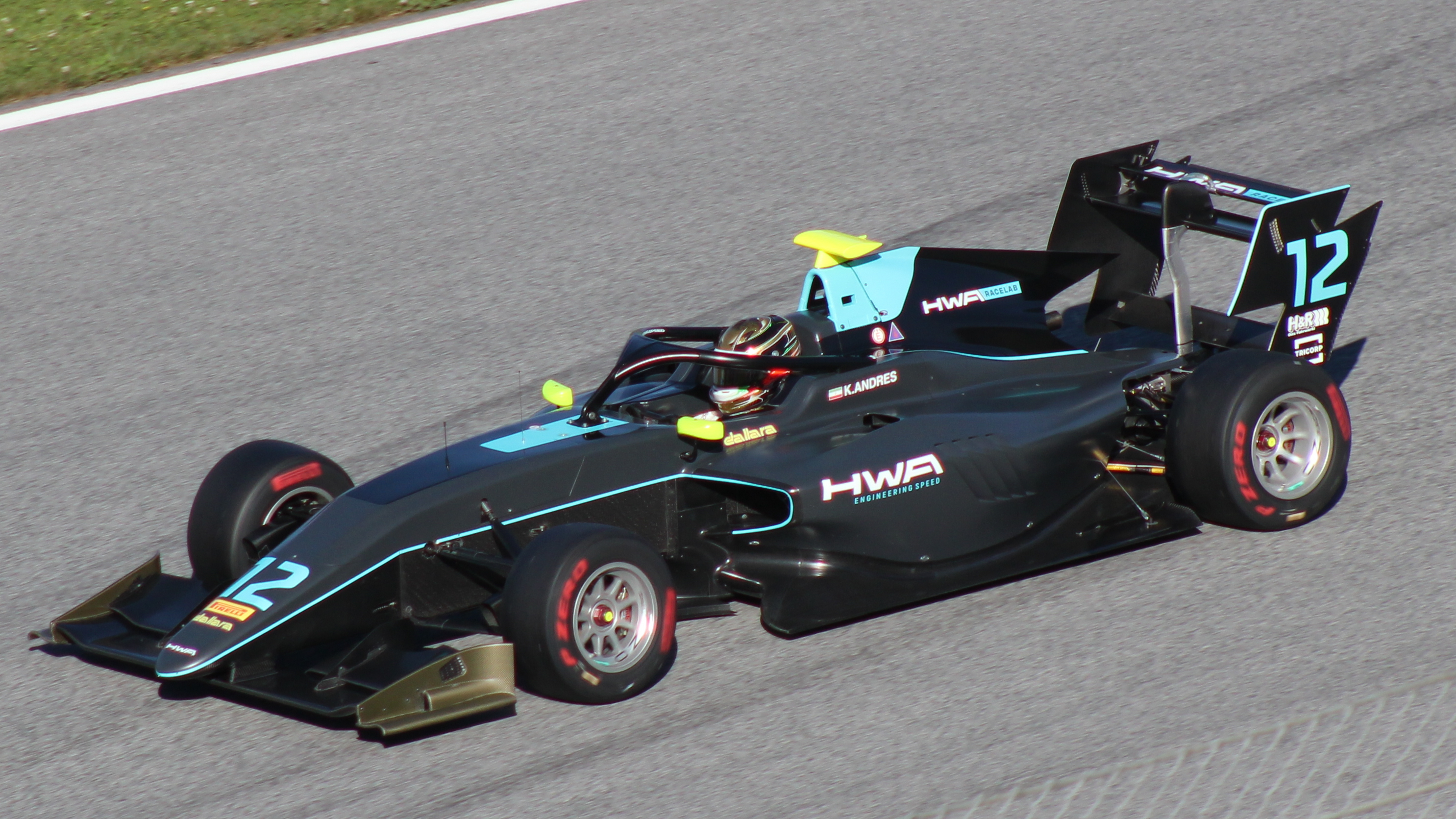
- Andres driving the Dallara F3 2019 during the 2019 Spielberg Formula 3 round
- Nationality: (Germany) German (Iran) Iranian via dual nationality
- Born: Keyvan Andres Soori; March 8, 2000 (age 26) Cologne, Germany

FIA Formula 3 European Championship career
- Debut season: 2017
- Current team: Van Amersfoort Racing
- Car number: 15
- Former teams: Motopark
- Starts: 60
- Wins: 0
- Poles: 0
- Fastest laps: 0
- Best finish: 18th in 2018

Previous series
- 2016 2015 2014–2015 2013–2014 2011–2013: Euroformula Open Championship; Atlantic Championship; USF2000; Formula Skip Barber; Karting

Championship titles
- 2013–14: Skip Barber Winter Series

Keyvan Andres Soori (born 8 March 2000, in Cologne, Germany) is a German-Iranian former racing driver.

== Career ==
=== Karting ===
Andres started his racing career in karting in 2011. He competed in the Minimes class of the regional Provence-Alpes-Côte d'Azur championship. The eleven-year-old also competed in the French Bridgestone Cup. The following year, he joined the Kerpener Kart Challenge in the KF3 class placing fifth in the championship. Andres was entered by Lotus Racing Karts, a subsidiary of Group Lotus. He also entered the ADAC Kart Masters event at Kerpen racing other future stars like Mick Schumacher. The year 2013 was the final year in karts for the Andres. He scored five points in the WSK Super Master Series KFJ class.

=== Open Wheel ===
==== United States ====
In 2013, Andres made his debut in formula racing. At the Virginia International Raceway, Andres, racing under the name Keyvan Soori, came in fourth in his first Skip Barber Formula 2000 race. Drivers like Colton Herta, Garth Rickards and Nikita Lastochkin also competed in the race. Andres was eventually placed eleventh in the championship winning one race, at Road Atlanta. In the winter of 2013–14, he won the Skip Barber Winter Series, winning seven out of fourteen races to take the title. Due to his success. Andres graduated into the Mazda Road to Indy program. In 2014, he raced for Cape Motorsports-Wayne Taylor Racing in the USF2000 championship supporting the IndyCar Series. At Indianapolis, he scored his best result finishing in sixth place. For 2015, Andres switched teams joining ArmsUp Motorsports for their USF2000 campaign. He was the first German-registered driver since 2006 (Andreas Wirth) to win an Atlantic Championship race. The fifteen-year-old won his debut race in the series at Watkins Glen International.

==== New Zealand ====
In December 2016, Andres was named as part of the Giles Motorsport line-up for the Toyota Racing Series. He finished 11th in the standings with a best result of eighth twice.

==== Europe ====
In 2017, Andres was signed to Motopark for the 2017 European Formula 3 Championship, where he switched to competing under an Iranian license.

== Personal life ==
Andres was born in Cologne, Germany on 3 March 2000 to parents with Persian roots. When he was two years old, the family moved to France. In 2013, he moved to Naples, Florida. He attended the Community School of Naples, and graduated in 2017.

== Racing record ==
=== Career summary ===
Season	Series	Team	Races	Wins	Poles	F/Laps	Podiums	Points	Position
2013–14	Formula Skip Barber	N/A	14	7	4	4	12	342	**1st**
2014	U.S. F2000 National Championship	Cape Motorsports w/ Wayne Taylor Racing	14	0	0	0	0	114	17th
2015	U.S. F2000 National Championship	ArmsUp Motorsports	16	0	0	0	0	177	11th
2015	Atlantic Championship	K-Hill Motorsports	7	5	2	2	6	331	5th
2016	Euroformula Open Championship	Carlin	16	0	0	0	0	42	12th
2016	Spanish Formula 3 Championship	Carlin	6	0	0	0	0	18	9th
2017	FIA Formula 3 European Championship	Motopark	30	0	0	0	0	0	21st
2017	Toyota Racing Series	Giles Motorsport	15	0	0	0	0	413	11th
2018	FIA Formula 3 European Championship	Van Amersfoort Racing	30	0	0	0	1	18	18th
2018	Macau Grand Prix	Van Amersfoort Racing	1	0	0	0	0	N/A	DNF
2019	FIA Formula 3 Championship	HWA Racelab	16	0	0	0	0	0	28th
2019	Macau Grand Prix	HWA Racelab	1	0	0	0	0	N/A	27th

=== American Open-Wheel racing results ===
(key) (Races in bold indicate pole position, races in italics indicate fastest race lap)

==== U.S. F2000 National Championship ====
Year	Team	1	2	3	4	5	6	7	8	9	10	11	12	13	14	15	16	Rank	Points
2014	Cape Motorsports Wayne Taylor Racing	STP; 10	STP; 9	BAR; 14	BAR; 15	IMS; 22	IMS; 6	LOR; 8	TOR; 21	TOR; 13	MOH; 20	MOH; 9	MOH; 14	SNM; 11	SNM; 11			**16th**	**114**
2015	ArmsUp Motorsports	STP; 16	STP; 7	NOL; 6	NOL; 7	BAR; 7	BAR; 7	IMS; 15	IMS; 10	LOR; 7	TOR; 13	TOR; 13	MOH; 8	MOH; 11	MOH; 18	LAG; 6	LAG; 8	11th	177

==== Atlantic Championship ====
Year	Team	1	2	3	4	5	6	7	8	9	10	11	12	13	14	15	Rank	Points
2015	K-Hill Motorsports	PBI	ATL	ATL	WGL; 1	**WGL**; 1	VIR; 1	VIR; 2	MOH	MOH	PIT	PIT; 6	NJMP; 1	**NJMP**; 1	PIT	PIT	5th	331

=== Complete Euroformula Open Championship results ===
(key) (Races in bold indicate pole position; races in italics indicate points for the fastest lap of top ten finishers)

Year	Entrant	1	2	3	4	5	6	7	8	9	10	11	12	13	14	15	16	DC	Points
2016	Carlin Motorsport	EST; 1; 9	EST; 2; 10	SPA; 1; 9	SPA; 2; 21	LEC; 1; 14	LEC; 2; 8	SIL; 1; 13	SIL; 2; 13	RBR; 1; 6	RBR; 2; 16	MNZ; 1 Ret	MNZ; 2; 7	JER; 1; 9	JER; 2; 11	CAT; 1; 5	CAT; 2 Ret	12th	42

=== Complete Toyota Racing Series results ===
(key) (Races in bold indicate pole position) (Races in italics indicate fastest lap)

Year	Team	1	2	3	4	5	6	7	8	9	10	11	12	13	14	15	DC	Points
2017	Giles Motorsport	RUA; 1; 12	RUA; 2; 10	RUA; 3 Ret	TER; 1; 10	TER; 2; 8	TER; 3; 17	HMP; 1; 10	HMP; 2; 12	HMP; 3; 12	TAU; 1; 10	TAU; 2; 10	TAU; 3; 13	MAN; 1; 18	MAN; 2; 10	MAN; 3; 8	11th	423

=== Complete FIA Formula 3 European Championship results ===
(key) (Races in bold indicate pole position) (Races in italics indicate fastest lap)

Year	Entrant	Engine	1	2	3	4	5	6	7	8	9	10	11	12	13	14	15	16	17	18	19	20	21	22	23	24	25	26	27	28	29	30	DC	Points
2017	Motopark	Volkswagen	SIL; 1; 15	SIL; 2; 14	SIL; 3; 16	MNZ; 1; 15	MNZ; 2; 12	MNZ; 3 Ret	PAU; 1; 12	PAU; 2; 15	PAU; 3 Ret	HUN; 1; 14	HUN; 2; 18	HUN; 3; 16	NOR; 1; 14	NOR; 2; 17	NOR; 3; 14	SPA; 1; 13	SPA; 2; 12	SPA; 3; 13	ZAN; 1; 12	ZAN; 2; 13	ZAN; 3; 15	NÜR; 1; 17	NÜR; 2; 19	NÜR; 3; 14	RBR; 1; 15	RBR; 2; 14	RBR; 3 Ret	HOC; 1; 20	HOC; 2 Ret	HOC; 3; 14	21st	0
2018	Van Amersfoort Racing	Mercedes	PAU; 1 Ret	PAU; 2; 14	PAU; 3; 14	HUN; 1; 16	HUN; 2; 15	HUN; 3; 13	NOR; 1; 10	NOR; 2; 3	NOR; 3 Ret	ZAN; 1; 20	ZAN; 2; 18	ZAN; 3; 17	SPA; 1; 10	SPA; 2; 12	SPA; 3; 20	SIL; 1; 16	SIL; 2; 18	SIL; 3; 16	MIS; 1; 19	MIS; 2; 18	MIS; 3; 17	NÜR; 1; 10	NÜR; 2; 12	NÜR; 3; 15	RBR; 1; 18	RBR; 2 Ret	RBR; 3; 13	HOC; 1; 17	HOC; 2; 17	HOC; 3; 20	18th	18

=== Complete Macau Grand Prix results ===
Year	Team	Car	Qualifying	Quali Race	Main race
2018	(Netherlands) Van Amersfoort Racing	Dallara F317	25th	20th	DNF
2019	(Germany) HWA Racelab	Dallara F3 2019	22nd	11th	12th

=== Complete FIA Formula 3 Championship results ===
(key) (Races in bold indicate pole position; races in italics indicate points for the fastest lap of top ten finishers)

Year	Entrant	1	2	3	4	5	6	7	8	9	10	11	12	13	14	15	16	DC	Points
2019	HWA Racelab	CAT; FEA; 28	CAT; SPR; 18	LEC; FEA; DNS	LEC; SPR; 19	RBR; FEA; 27	RBR; SPR; 13	SIL; FEA; 21	SIL; SPR; 26	HUN; FEA; 23	HUN; SPR; 14	SPA; FEA; 14	SPA; SPR; 16	MNZ; FEA; 19	MNZ; SPR; 22	SOC; FEA; 19	SOC; SPR; 23	28th	0

Sporting positions
Preceded by Jake Eidson	Skip Barber Winter Series Champion; 2013–14	Succeeded by Timo Reger
