= Enaam Ahmed =

British Pakistani former racing driver (born 2000)

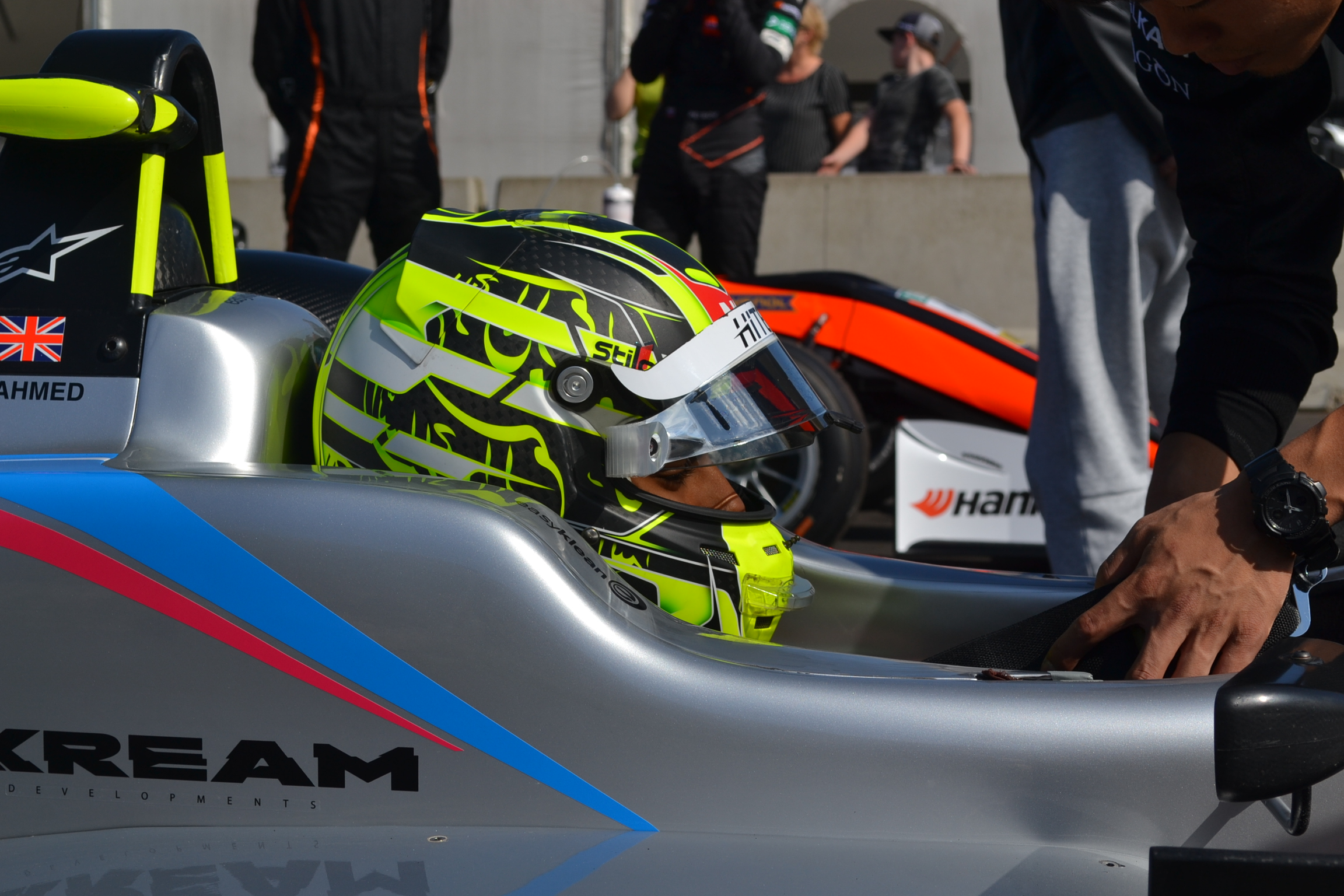
- Nationality: (Pakistan) Pakistani (2022–present) (United Kingdom) British (until 2022) (Note: Ahmed competed under a British racing licence earlier in his career. He currently represents Pakistan.)
- Born: 4 February 2000 (age 26) London, United Kingdom

Indy NXT career
- Debut season: 2023
- Current team: Cape Motorsports
- Categorisation: FIA Gold
- Car number: 47
- Starts: 7
- Wins: 0
- Podiums: 0
- Poles: 0
- Fastest laps: 0
- Best finish: 18th in 2023

Previous series
- 2021–22 2020 2019 2019 2018 2017 2016–17 2016 2015 2015: Indy Pro 2000 Championship; FIA F3 Championship; Japanese F3 Championship; Euroformula Open Championship; FIA F3 European Championship; Toyota Racing Series; BRDC British F3 Championship; BRDC British F3 Autumn Trophy; MSA Formula; SMP F4 Championship

Championship titles
- 2017 2016: BRDC British F3 Championship; BRDC British F3 Autumn Trophy

Enaam Ahmed (Urdu: انعام احمد; born 4 February 2000) is a Pakistani and British former racing driver. He last competed in the 2023 Indy NXT driving for Cape Motorsports. Ahmed previously competed in the 2022 Indy Pro 2000 Championship driving for Juncos Hollinger Racing and previously drove for RP Motorsport in the 2021 season.

== Racing career ==
=== Karting ===
In 2014, Ahmed won the Karting World Championship.

=== British F4 ===
In 2015, Ahmed made his debut in MSA Formula for Arden where he finished eighth overall, winning one race and the Rookie Cup in his first year racing cars. He also made occasional appearances in the SMP F4 Championship where he enjoyed even more success, picking up five wins and two poles.

For 2016, it was announced that Ahmed would be driving for Douglas Motorsport in the British Formula Three Championship. He finished fifth overall.

=== Toyota Racing Series ===
In 2017, Ahmed took part in the Toyota Racing Series with Giles Motorsport alongside Red Bull Juniors Luis Leeds and Richard Verschoor.

=== BRDC Formula 3 Championship ===
In January 2017, it was announced Ahmed would switch to Carlin for a second season of British F3. Ahmed made BRDC British Formula 3 Championship history by taking all three wins in the opening round of the season at Oulton Park. He also recorded three fastest laps across the three races to leave the weekend as championship leader with a perfect score of 95 points.

Ahmed went on to make it four wins from four races by taking victory in the opening race at Rockingham Speedway, before a further two wins at the next round at Snetterton Circuit saw Ahmed surpass the total number of wins achieved by a driver throughout the entirety of the 2016 campaign (five). Although Ahmed finished off the top step of the podium for the first time during a weekend in 2017 at Silverstone, two podium finishes allowed Ahmed to extend his lead in the championship standings.

Ahmed claimed his first pole of the 2017 season in a qualifying session at Circuit de Spa-Francorchamps, before going on to record his seventh and eighth wins of the season. A further second place finish stretched his lead at the top of the drivers' standings to 82 points over nearest rival Toby Sowery.

At the next round at Brands Hatch, Ahmed went on to take his second successive pole position, before sealing a lights-to-flag victory in the opening race. He recovered from eighth to finish on the podium in third place in the reverse grid race and recorded another lights-to-flag win – his tenth of the season – in the final race of the weekend.

Ahmed sealed the 2017 BRDC British Formula 3 Championship title at the penultimate round of the season at Snetterton, having claimed a further two victories to take his tally up to twelve – matching triple F1 world champion Ayrton Senna's total of wins from his own title-winning campaign in 1983. As a result, the Carlin driver became the series' youngest-ever champion at just seventeen years old.

At the season finale at Donington Park, Ahmed won the 24th and final race of the season – his thirteenth victory of the campaign – to surpass the total number of wins Ayrton Senna achieved in 1983 (twelve). He ended the year on 654 points, 164 clear of his nearest rival.

=== European Formula 3 Championship ===
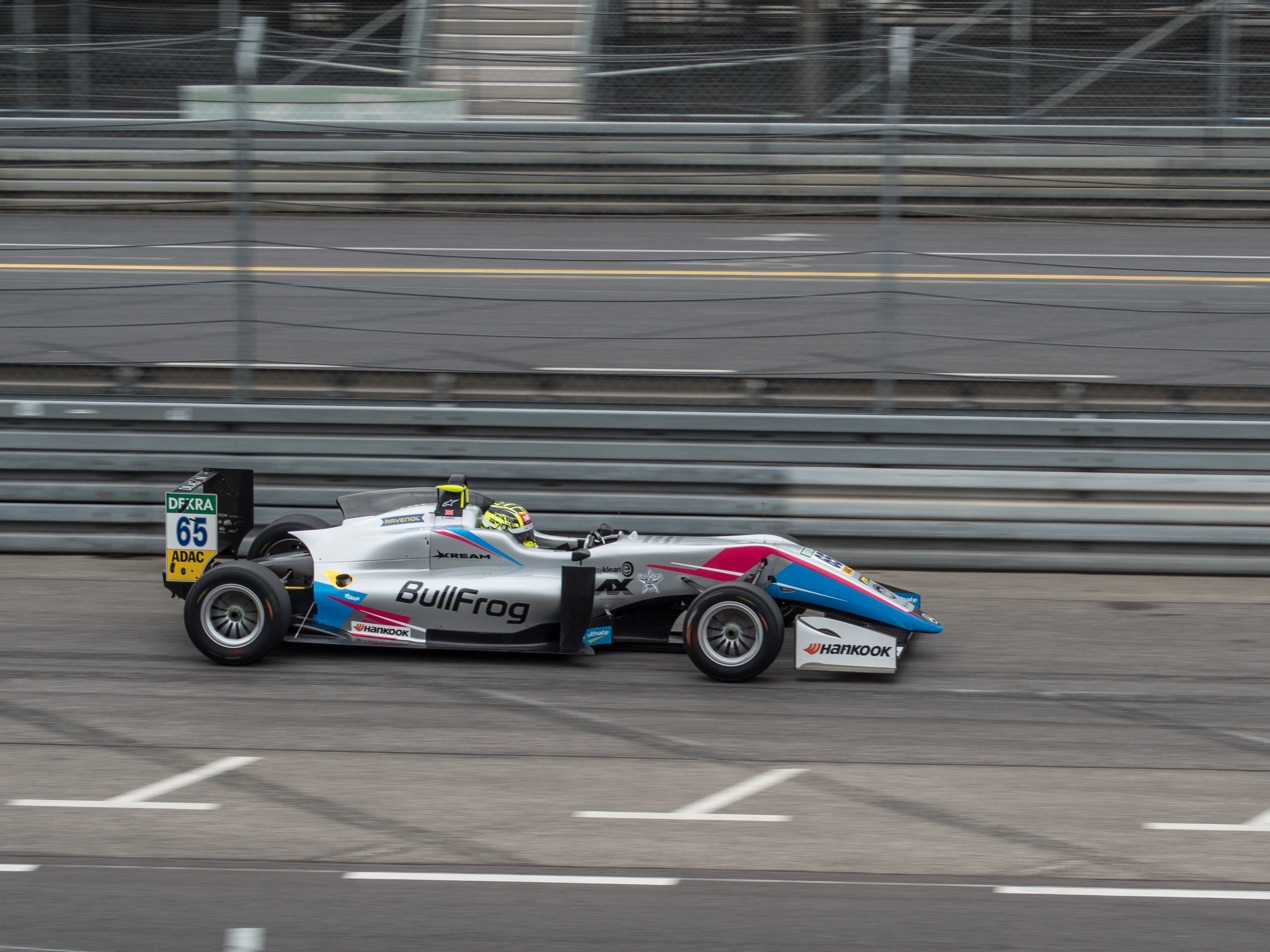
Ahmed competing at the Norisring during the 2018 FIA Formula 3 European Championship.

In December 2017, it was confirmed Ahmed would contest the 2018 FIA Formula 3 European Championship with Silverstone-based Hitech GP, where he claimed two wins to finish ninth in the championship.

=== Japanese F3 ===
The following year, Ahmed moved to Japan to contest the Japanese Formula 3 championship with ThreeBond Racing but switched to B-MAX Racing with Motopark prior to the start of the season. There he claimed two wins at Fuji and Sugo to finish third in the championship behind teammate Sacha Fenestraz and TOM'S driver Ritomo Miyata.

=== FIA Formula 3 Championship ===
Later that year, Ahmed partook in the FIA Formula 3 post-season test with Prema Powerteam. He ended up signing for Carlin Buzz Racing to partner Clément Novalak and Cameron Das in the 2020 FIA Formula 3 Championship. On 30 July, after six races, Carlin announced that Ahmed and his sponsors had departed from the team, being replaced by Ben Barnicoat.

=== Indy Pro 2000 ===
==== 2021 ====
On 2 April 2021, Ahmed announced that he would move to the United States to compete in the Indy Pro 2000 championship with RP Motorsport. It was initially announced as a part-time deal as it was unsure whether or not Ahmed would contest the full season due to sponsorship issues. Due to a lack of budget, Ahmed was no longer able to compete in the following races of the championship. However, it was announced on 29 September that Ahmed would compete in the final two races of the 2021 season with Juncos Hollinger Racing, replacing Manuel Sulaimán.

==== 2022 ====
On 11 February 2022, Ahmed signed to compete in the full 2022 Indy Pro 2000 Championship season with Juncos Hollinger Racing.

=== Indy NXT ===
Ahmed moved up to the Indy NXT for 2023, teaming up with Cape Motorsports. He was partnered with Jagger Jones.

== Racing record ==
=== Career summary ===
Season	Series	Team	Races	Wins	Poles	F/Laps	Podiums	Points	Position
2015	MSA Formula Championship	Arden International	30	1	0	0	4	176	8th
2015	SMP F4 Championship	Koiranen GP	15	5	2	0	7	0	NC†
2016	BRDC British Formula 3 Championship	Douglas Motorsport	23	1	0	0	5	349	5th
2016	BRDC British Formula 3 Autumn Trophy	Carlin	3	2	2	0	3	99	**1st**
2016	Euroformula Open Championship	DAV Racing	8	0	0	0	0	49	11th
2017	BRDC British Formula 3 Championship	Carlin	24	13	8	13	18	575	**1st**
2017	Toyota Racing Series	Giles Motorsport	15	1	0	1	2	586	6th
2018	FIA Formula 3 European Championship	Hitech Bullfrog GP	30	2	2	1	4	174	9th
2018	Macau Grand Prix	Hitech Bullfrog GP	1	0	0	0	0	N/A	DNF
2019	Japanese Formula 3 Championship	B-Max Racing with Motopark	20	2	1	1	8	63	**3rd**
2019	Euroformula Open Championship	Motopark	2	0	0	1	2	37	15th
2019	Macau Grand Prix	Campos Racing	1	0	0	0	0	N/A	22nd
2019	Kyalami 9 Hours - Pro	R-Motorsport	1	0	0	0	0	N/A	13th
2020	FIA Formula 3 Championship	Carlin Buzz Racing	6	0	0	0	0	0	32nd
2021	Indy Pro 2000 Championship	RP Motorsport USA	7	0	0	1	0	138	12th
2021	Indy Pro 2000 Championship	Juncos Hollinger Racing	2	0	0	0	1	138	12th
2022	Indy Pro 2000 Championship	Juncos Hollinger Racing	18	0	0	0	5	338	**3rd**
2023	Indy NXT	Cape Motorsports	7	0	0	0	0	150	18th

† As Ahmed was a guest driver, he was ineligible for championship points.

^{*} Season still in progress.

=== Complete MSA Formula Championship results ===
(key) (Races in bold indicate pole position; races in italics indicate fastest lap)

Year	Team	1	2	3	4	5	6	7	8	9	10	11	12	13	14	15	16	17	18	19	20	21	22	23	24	25	26	27	28	29	30	DC	Points
2015	Arden International	BHI; 1; 9	BHI; 2 Ret	BHI; 3; 7	DON; 1; 11	DON; 2; 19	DON; 3; 8	THR; 1; 8	THR; 2; 7	THR; 3; 10	OUL; 1; 15	OUL; 2; 20	OUL; 3; 11	CRO; 1; 9	CRO; 2; 8	CRO; 3; 11	SNE; 1; 6	SNE; 2; 7	SNE; 3; 7	KNO; 1; 2	KNO; 2; 5	KNO; 3; 4	ROC; 1; 4	ROC; 2; 6	ROC; 3; 13	SIL; 1; 11	SIL; 2; 11	SIL; 3; 3	BHGP; 1; 4	BHGP; 2; 1	BHGP; 3; 3	8th	176

=== Complete SMP F4 Championship results ===
(key) (Races in bold indicate pole position; races in italics indicate fastest lap)

Year	1	2	3	4	5	6	7	8	9	10	11	12	13	14	15	16	17	18	19	20	21	DC	Points
2015	AHV; 1; 5	AHV; 2; 3	AHV; 3; 9	MSC1; 1	MSC1; 2	MSC1; 3	SOC; 1; 9	SOC; 2; 4	SOC; 3; 9	ALA; 1; 5	ALA; 2; 9†	ALA; 3; 3	AUD1; 1; 1	AUD1; 2; 1	AUD1; 3; 6	MSC2; 1	MSC2; 2	MSC2; 3	**AUD2**; **1**; 1	AUD2; 2; 1	**AUD2**; **3**; 1	NC	-

=== Complete BRDC British Formula 3 Championship results ===
(key) (Races in bold indicate pole position; races in italics indicate fastest lap)

Year	Team	1	2	3	4	5	6	7	8	9	10	11	12	13	14	15	16	17	18	19	20	21	22	23	24	DC	Points
2016	Douglas Motorsport	SNE1; 1; 3	SNE1; 2; 2	SNE1; 3; 1	BRH; 1 Ret	BRH; 2; 17	BRH; 3; 14	ROC; 1; 6	ROC; 2; 19	ROC; 3; 5	OUL; 1; 8	OUL; 2; 2	OUL; 3; 4	SIL; 1; 5	SIL; 2; 5	SIL; 3 C	SPA; 1; 4	SPA; 2; 4	SPA; 3; 19	SNE2; 1 Ret	SNE2; 2; 17	SNE2; 3; 4	DON; 1; 6	DON; 2; 6	DON; 3; 2	5th	349
2017	Carlin	OUL; 1; 1	OUL; 2; 1	**OUL**; **3**; 1	ROC; 1; 1	ROC; 2; 8	ROC; 3; 8	SNE1; 1; 1	SNE1; 2; 6	**SNE1**; **3**; 1	SIL; 1; 2	SIL; 2; 5	SIL; 3; 3	**SPA**; **1**; 2	SPA; 2; 1	**SPA**; **3**; 1	**BRH**; **1**; 1	BRH; 2; 3	**BRH**; **3**; 1	**SNE2**; **1**; 1	SNE2; 2; 5	**SNE2**; **3**; 1	DON; 1; 2	DON; 2; 6	DON; 3; 1	1st	575

=== Complete Toyota Racing Series results ===
(key) (Races in bold indicate pole position) (Races in italics indicate fastest lap)

Year	Team	1	2	3	4	5	6	7	8	9	10	11	12	13	14	15	DC	Points
2017	Giles Motorsport	RUA; 1; 8	RUA; 2; 12	RUA; 3; 2	TER; 1; 5	TER; 2 Ret	TER; 3; 8	HMP; 1; 5	HMP; 2; 1	HMP; 3; 9	TAU; 1; 7	TAU; 2; 7	TAU; 3; 11	MAN; 1; 6	MAN; 2 Ret	MAN; 3; 6	6th	586

=== Complete FIA Formula 3 European Championship results ===
(key) (Races in bold indicate pole position) (Races in italics indicate fastest lap)

Year	Entrant	Engine	1	2	3	4	5	6	7	8	9	10	11	12	13	14	15	16	17	18	19	20	21	22	23	24	25	26	27	28	29	30	DC	Points
2018	Hitech Bullfrog GP	Mercedes	PAU; 1; 6	PAU; 2; 5	**PAU**; **3**; 2‡	HUN; 1; 7	HUN; 2; 1	**HUN**; **3**; 1	NOR; 1; 14	NOR; 2; 15	NOR; 3; 8	ZAN; 1; 16	ZAN; 2 Ret	ZAN; 3; 10	SPA; 1; 19	SPA; 2; 5	SPA; 3; 6	SIL; 1; 3	SIL; 2; 4	SIL; 3; 4	MIS; 1; 21	MIS; 2; 6	MIS; 3; 10	NÜR; 1; 4	NÜR; 2 Ret	NÜR; 3; 9	RBR; 1; 22	RBR; 2; 11	RBR; 3; 18	HOC; 1; 9	HOC; 2 Ret	HOC; 3; 8	9th	174

^{‡} Half points awarded as less than 75% of race distance was completed.

=== Complete Macau Grand Prix results ===
Year	Team	Car	Qualifying	Quali Race	Main race
2018	(United Kingdom) Hitech Bullfrog GP	Dallara F317	17th	15th	DNF
2019	(Spain) Campos Racing	Dallara F3 2019	20th	DNF	22nd

=== Complete Japanese Formula 3 Championship results ===
(key) (Races in bold indicate pole position) (Races in italics indicate fastest lap)

Year	Team	Engine	1	2	3	4	5	6	7	8	9	10	11	12	13	14	15	16	17	18	19	20	Pos	Points
2019	B-Max Racing with Motopark	Volkswagen	SUZ; 1; 3	SUZ; 2; 2	AUT; 1; 3	AUT; 2; 3	AUT; 3 Ret	OKA; 1; 10	OKA; 2; 7	OKA; 3 Ret	SUG; 1; 6	SUG; 2; 3	FUJ; 1; 1	FUJ; 2; 2	SUG; 1; 4	**SUG**; **2**; 1	SUG; 3; 4	MOT; 1 Ret	MOT; 2; 13	MOT; 3; 11	OKA; 1 Ret	OKA; 2; 7	3rd	63

=== Complete FIA Formula 3 Championship results ===
(key) (Races in bold indicate pole position) (Races in italics indicate fastest lap)

Year	Entrant	1	2	3	4	5	6	7	8	9	10	11	12	13	14	15	16	17	18	DC	Points
2020	Carlin Buzz Racing	RBR; FEA; 23	RBR; SPR; 24	RBR; FEA; 19	RBR; SPR; 15	HUN; FEA; 14	HUN; SPR; 21	SIL; FEA	SIL; SPR	SIL; FEA	SIL; SPR	CAT; FEA	CAT; SPR	SPA; FEA	SPA; SPR	MNZ; FEA	MNZ; SPR	MUG; FEA	MUG; SPR	32nd	0

=== American open-wheel racing results ===
==== Indy Pro 2000 Championship ====
(key) (Races in bold indicate pole position) (Races in italics indicate fastest lap)

Year	Entrant	1	2	3	4	5	6	7	8	9	10	11	12	13	14	15	16	17	18	DC	Points
2021	RP Motorsport	ALA; 1; 5	ALA; 2; 9	STP; 1; 7	STP; 2; 9	IMS; 1; 13	IMS; 2; 5	IMS; 3; 4	LOR; Wth											12th	138
2021	Juncos Hollinger Racing									ROA; 1	ROA; 2	MOH; 1	MOH; 2	GMP	NJM; 1	NJM; 2	NJM; 3	MOH; 1; 8	MOH; 2; 2	12th	138
2022	Juncos Hollinger Racing	STP; 1; 2	STP; 2; 13	ALA; 1; 3	ALA; 2; 4	IMS; 1; 5	IMS; 2; 15	IMS; 3; 5	IRP; 4	ROA; 1; 3	ROA; 2; 4	MOH; 1; 6	MOH; 2; 4	TOR; 1; 2	TOR; 2; 7	GMP; 7	POR; 1; 3	POR; 2; 4	POR; 3; 4	3rd	338

==== Indy NXT ====
(key) (Races in bold indicate pole position) (Races in italics indicate fastest lap) (Races with ^{L} indicate a race lap led) (Races with * indicate most race laps led)

Year	Team	1	2	3	4	5	6	7	8	9	10	11	12	13	14	Rank	Points
2023	Cape Motorsports	STP; 19	BAR; 4	IMS; 10	DET; 5	DET; 10	RDA; 17	MOH; 8	IOW	NSH	IMS	GMP	POR	LAG	LAG	18th	150

== Notes ==
Sporting positions
Preceded by Ben Barnicoat (BRDC Formula 4)	BRDC British Formula 3 Autumn Trophy champion 2016	Succeeded by None (Series ended)
Preceded by Matheus Leist	BRDC British Formula 3 Championship champion 2017	Succeeded by Linus Lundqvist
Awards and achievements
Preceded by Lando Norris	Autosport Awards; British Club Driver of the Year; 2017	Succeeded by None
