= Jean-Baptiste Simmenauer =

French racing driver (born 2000)

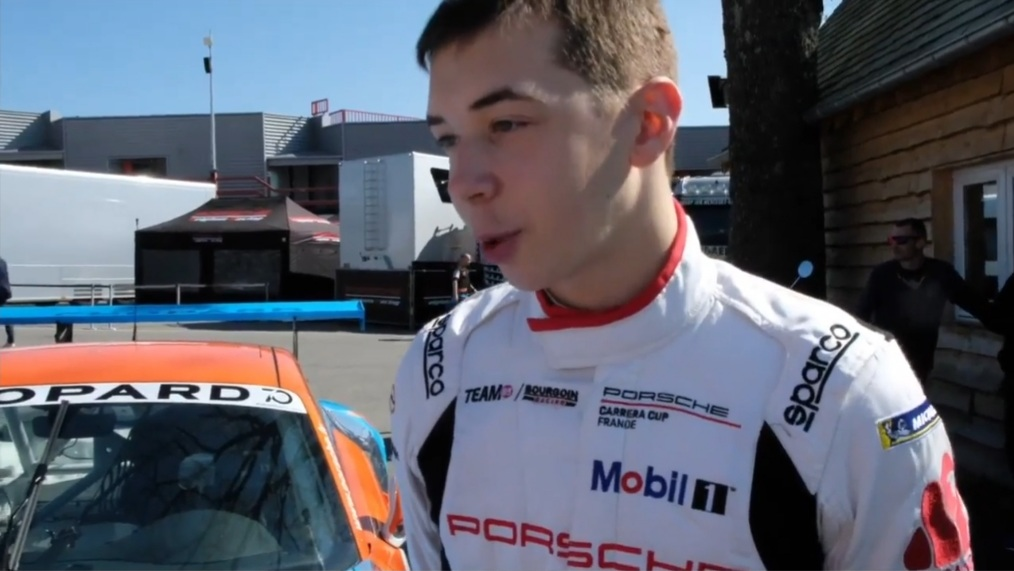
- Nationality: (France) French
- Born: 19 November 2000 (age 25) Chambray-lès-Tours, France

GTWCE Endurance Cup career
- Current team: ROFGO Racing with Team WRT
- Categorisation: FIA Silver (until 2022); FIA Gold (2023–)
- Car number: 30
- Starts: 5 (5 entries)
- Wins: 3
- Poles: 2
- Fastest laps: 0
- Best finish: 1st (Silver Cup) in 2022

Previous series
- 2018-2021 2017 2017: Porsche Supercup; Formula Renault Eurocup; Toyota Racing Series

Championship titles
- 2022: GTWCE Endurance Cup - Silver

Jean-Baptiste Simmenauer (born 19 November 2000) is a French racing driver who is competing in the Le Mans Cup as a factory driver for McLaren. He is the former champion of the GT World Challenge Europe Endurance Cup in the Silver Cup category, a title he achieved alongside Benjamin Goethe and Thomas Neubauer, driving for ROFGO Racing with Team WRT.

== Early career ==
=== Karting ===
Simmenauer first began karting in 2012 with Italian team Tony Kart. In 2015, he claimed the title in the French Karting Championship.

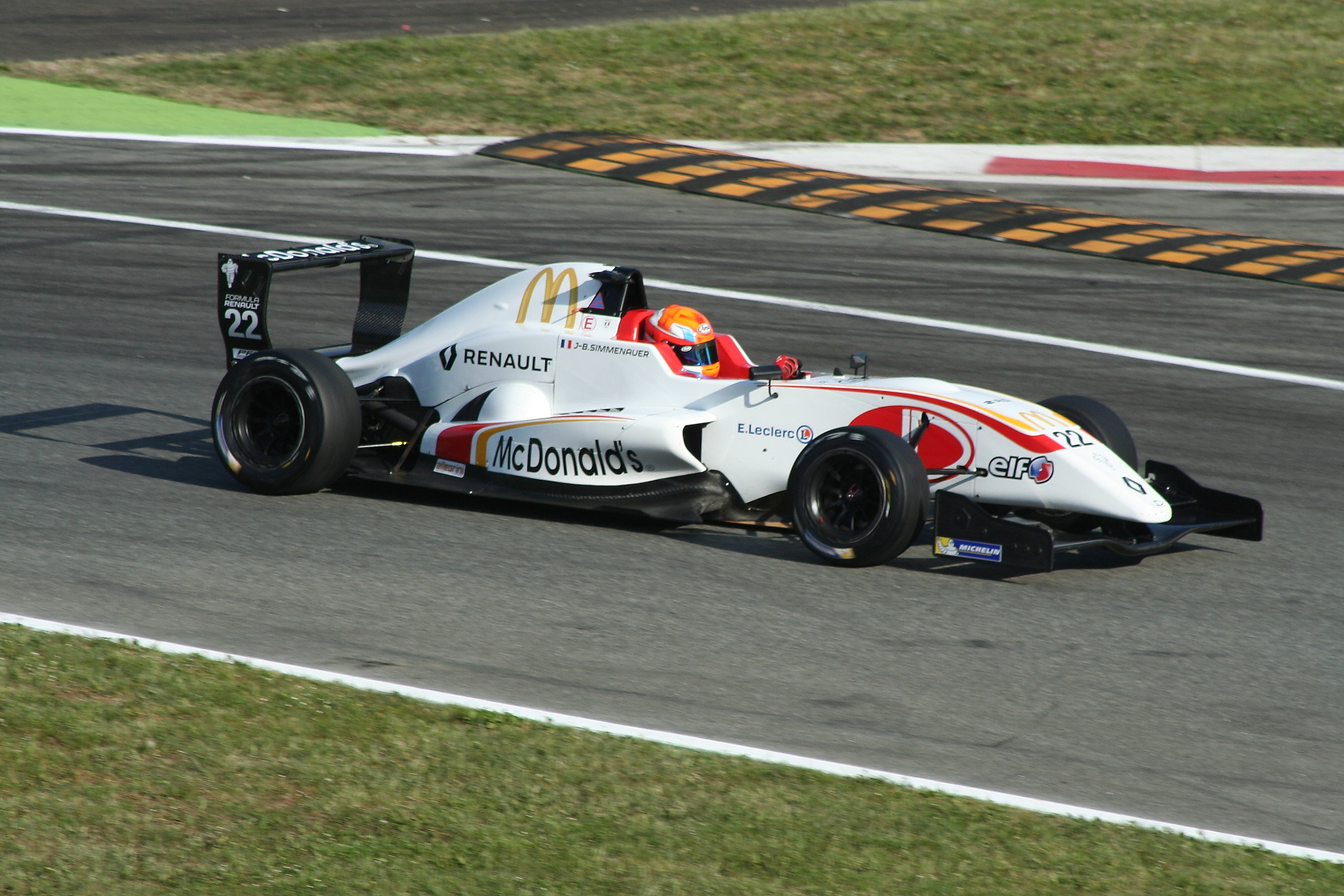
Simmenauer competing in Formula Renault Eurocup.

=== Toyota Racing Series ===
In December 2016, it was announced Simmenauer would make his debut in single-seaters in the Toyota Racing Series, replacing reigning champion Lando Norris, following the latter's decision not to defend his title.

=== Formula Renault 2.0 ===
In January 2017, Simmenauer joined JD Motorsport for the Formula Renault Eurocup. He went on to experience a disappointing campaign, failing to score points in a season he would end 27th in the standings.

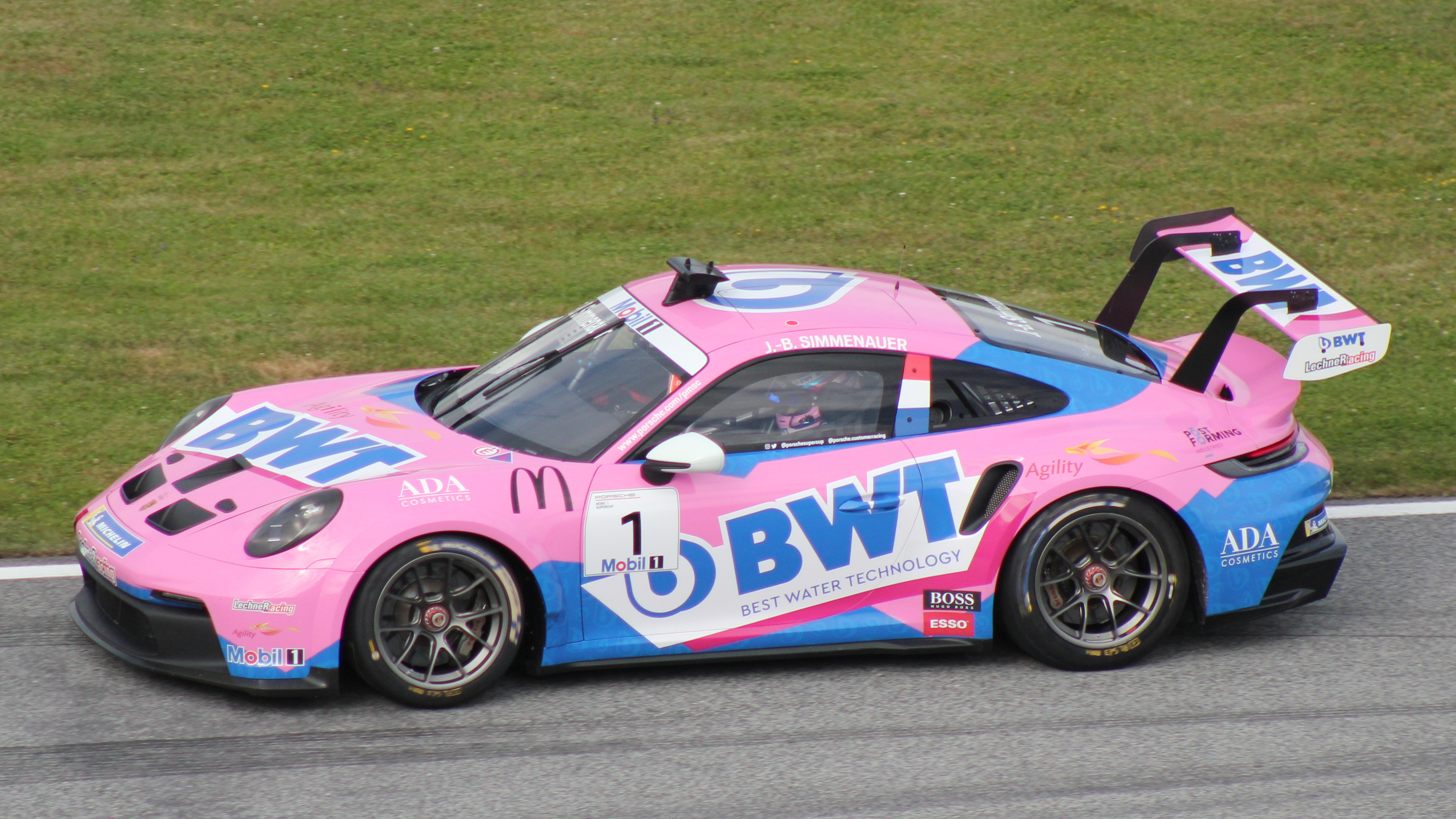
Simmenauer driving at the Red Bull Ring during the 2021 Porsche Supercup season.

== Sportscar career ==
=== Porsche Cup ===
Simmenauer switched to sportscar racing in 2018, driving for Lechner Racing in the Porsche Carrera Cup Germany. With a best result of sixth at the Nürburgring the Frenchman ended up 12th in the standings, having missed one of the seven rounds. In the middle of the season, Simmenauer made his debut in the Porsche Supercup, driving in the Silverstone event. The following year, another season of PCCG would be in store for Simmenauer, who would start a further four races in the Supercup. Once again with Lechner Racing, his best individual placing improved to fourth at the Norisring, though a number of retirements dropped him to 15th in the championship.

=== GT World Challenge ===
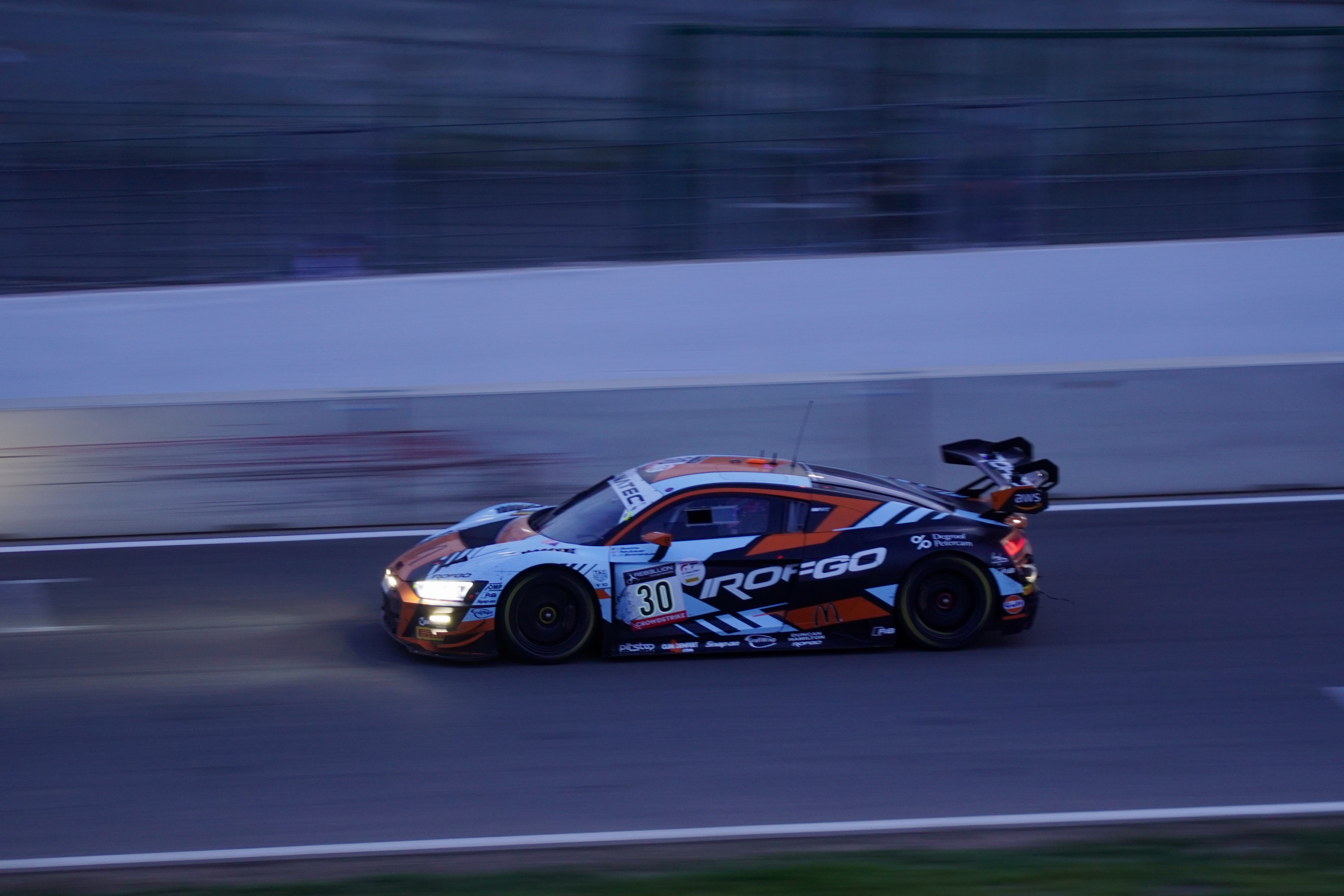
The #30 Audi R8 LMS from Team WRT at the 2022 24 Hours of Spa

For the 2022 season, Simmenauer joined Team WRT to compete in the GT World Challenge Europe Sprint Cup alongside Christopher Mies, whilst partnering Benjamin Goethe and Thomas Neubauer in the Silver Cup of the GT World Challenge Europe Endurance Cup. Notable success would come in the latter, as the Frenchman won three races in his category, which included the 24 Hours of Spa, which meant that Simmenauer and his teammates were crowned Silver Cup champions with one round to spare. Despite WRT's manufacturer change to BMW ahead of 2023, Simmenauer returned to the team. He partnered 2022 Endurance Cup co-driver Neubauer in the Pro class of the Sprint Cup, and joined Calan Williams and Niklas Krütten in the Endurance Cup.

=== LMP2 ===
Having made his prototype racing debut at the start of 2024, driving in the Abu Dhabi rounds of the Asian Le Mans Series with Duqueine Team, Simmenauer joined the team for a full season in the European Le Mans Series alongside James Allen and Niels Koolen. In addition, he would take part in that year's 24 Hours of Le Mans.

== Racing record ==
=== Career summary ===
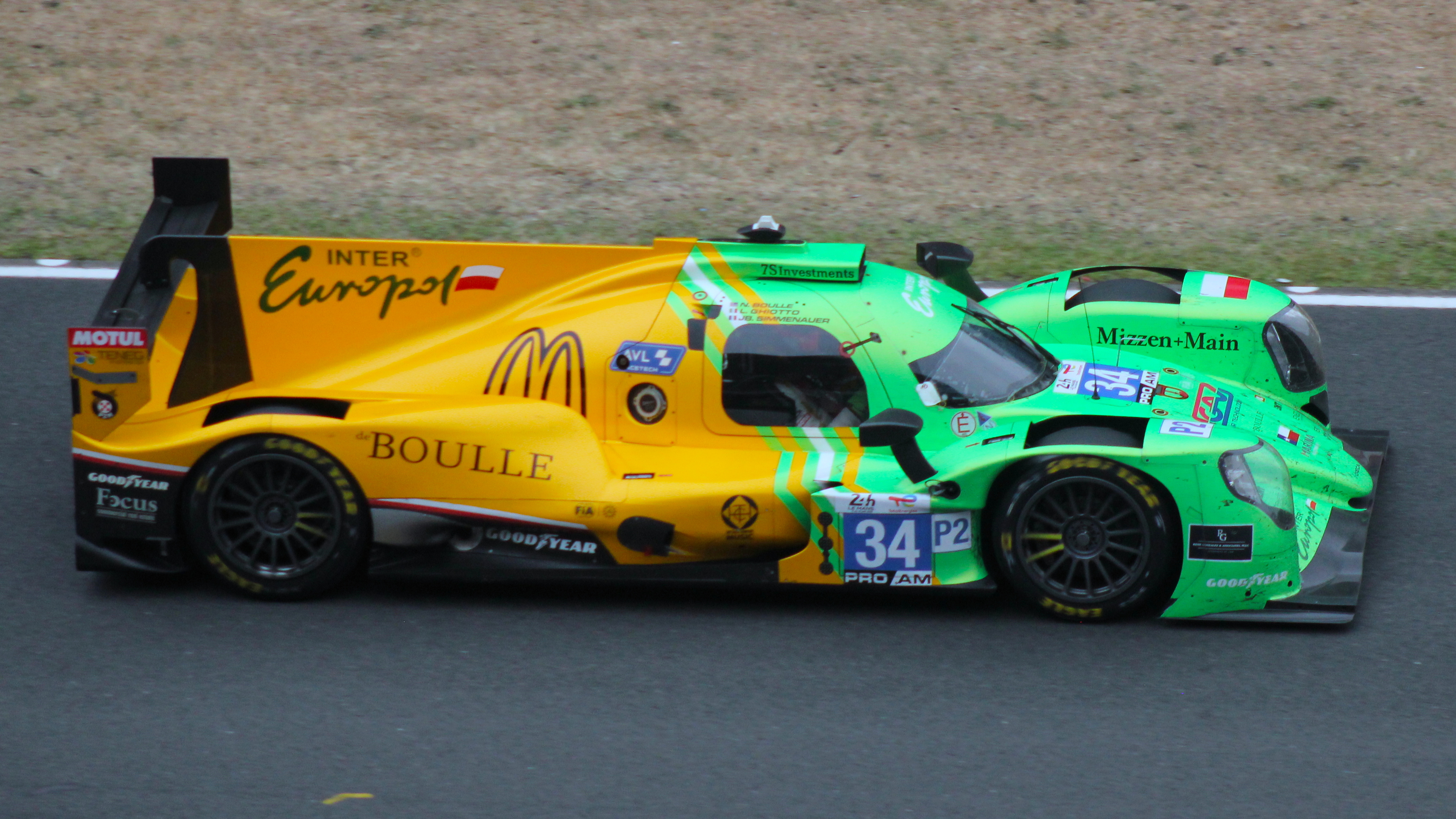
Simmenauer's No. 34 car at the 2025 24 Hours of Le Mans

Season	Series	Team	Races	Wins	Poles	F. Laps	Podiums	Points	Position
2017	Formula Renault Eurocup	JD Motorsport	22	0	0	0	0	0	27th
2017	Formula Renault 2.0 NEC	JD Motorsport	7	0	0	0	0	47	15th
2017	Toyota Racing Series	M2 Competition	15	0	0	0	0	253	19th
2017	NASCAR Whelen Euro Series	Alex Caffi Motorsport	2	0	0	0	0	64	32nd
2017	NASCAR Whelen Euro Series - Elite 2	Alex Caffi Motorsport	2	0	0	0	1	79	31st
2017-18	Porsche GT3 Middle East Championship	N/A	10	0	0	0	0	124	10th
2018	Porsche Carrera Cup Germany	Lechner Racing	12	0	0	0	0	52	12th
2018	Porsche GT3 Cup Challenge Benelux	Team 85 Bourgoin Racing	2	0	0	0	0	—N/a	NC†
2018	Porsche Supercup	Momo Megatron Lechner Racing Team	1	0	0	0	0	—N/a	NC†
2018-19	Porsche GT3 Middle East Championship	N/A	16	3	0	2	8	293	**3rd**
2019	Porsche Carrera Cup Germany	Lechner Racing Team	15	0	0	0	0	42.5	15th
2019	Porsche Supercup	Lechner Racing Middle East	4	0	0	0	0	—N/a	NC†
2019-20	Porsche Sprint Challenge Middle East	N/A	12	1	1	1	8	237	**2nd**
2020	Porsche Supercup	Lechner Racing Middle East	8	0	0	0	0	65	9th
2020	Porsche Carrera Cup France	BWT Lechner Racing	10	1	0	2	5	152	4th
2021	Porsche Supercup	BWT Lechner Racing	8	0	0	0	0	30	13th
2021	Porsche Carrera Cup France	BWT Lechner Racing	12	0	0	0	1	120	5th
2022	GT World Challenge Europe Sprint Cup	Belgian Audi Club Team WRT	10	0	0	0	0	22	9th
2022	24H GT Series - GT3	Belgian Audi Club Team WRT							
2022	GT World Challenge Europe Endurance Cup	ROFGO Racing with Team WRT	5	0	0	0	0	1	35th
2022	GT World Challenge Europe Endurance Cup - Silver Cup	ROFGO Racing with Team WRT	5	3	2	0	4	125	**1st**
2022	Intercontinental GT Challenge	Team WRT	1	0	0	0	0	2	21st
2022-23	Middle East Trophy - GT3	MS7 by Team WRT							
2023	GT World Challenge Europe Sprint Cup	Team WRT	10	0	0	0	1	12.5	11th
2023	GT World Challenge Europe Endurance Cup	Team WRT	5	0	0	0	0	0	NC
2023	GT World Challenge Europe Endurance Cup - Gold Cup	Team WRT	5	0	0	0	3	78	5th
2023	Intercontinental GT Challenge	Team WRT	1	0	0	0	0	4	28th
2023	Ultimate Cup Series Endurance GT-Touring Challenge - Porsche Cup	Seblajoux Racing	1	0	0	0	0	24	15th
2023-24	Asian Le Mans Series - LMP2	Duqueine Team	2	0	0	0	1	23	11th
2024	European Le Mans Series - LMP2	Duqueine Team	6	0	0	0	0	20	16th
2024	24 Hours of Le Mans - LMP2 Pro-Am	Duqueine Team	1	0	0	0	0	—N/a	DNF
2025	European Le Mans Series - LMP2	Inter Europol Competition	6	0	0	0	0	23	12th
2025	24 Hours of Le Mans - LMP2 Pro-Am	Inter Europol Competition	1	0	0	0	0	—N/a	5th
2025	GT World Challenge Asia	Absolute Corse	2	0	0	0	0	—N/a	NC†
2026	Bathurst 12 Hour - GT3 Silver	Volante Rosso Motorsport	1	0	0	0	0	—N/a	DNF
2026	GT Winter Series - GT3	SMC Motorsport							
2026	Le Mans Cup - GT3	SMC Motorsport	6	0	2	0	2	61	7th
2026	GT World Challenge Europe Endurance Cup	CSA Racing	2	0	0	0	0	0	NC

^{†} As Simmenauer was a guest driver, he was ineligible for championship points.
^{*} Season still in progress.

=== Complete Formula Renault NEC results ===
(key) (Races in bold indicate pole position) (Races in italics indicate fastest lap)

Year	Entrant	1	2	3	4	5	6	7	8	9	10	11	DC	Points
2017	JD Motorsport	MNZ; 1 Ret	MNZ; 2; 6	ASS; 1	ASS; 2	NÜR; 1; 6	NÜR; 2; 4	SPA; 1; 26	SPA; 2; 22	SPA; 3; 24	HOC; 1	HOC; 2	15th	47

=== Complete Formula Renault Eurocup results ===
(key) (Races in bold indicate pole position) (Races in italics indicate fastest lap)

Year	Team	1	2	3	4	5	6	7	8	9	10	11	12	13	14	15	16	17	18	19	20	21	22	23	Pos	Points
2017	JD Motorsport	MNZ; 1; 24	MNZ; 2; 19	SIL; 1; 25	SIL; 2; 20	PAU; 1 Ret	PAU; 2; 20	MON; 1; 22	MON; 2 DNQ	HUN; 1; 20	HUN; 2; 18	HUN; 3; 14	NÜR; 1; 22	NÜR; 2; 17	RBR; 1; 20	RBR; 2; 13	LEC; 1; 20	LEC; 2; 20	SPA; 1; 26	SPA; 2; 22	SPA; 3; 24	CAT; 1; 21	CAT; 2 Ret	CAT; 3 DNS	27th	0

=== Complete Porsche Carrera Cup Germany results ===
(key) (Races in bold indicate pole position) (Races in italics indicate fastest lap)

Year	Team	1	2	3	4	5	6	7	8	9	10	11	12	13	14	15	16	DC	Points
2018	Lechner Racing	OSC; 1; 15	OSC; 2; 14	RBR; 1; 7	RBR; 2; 10	NÜR1; 1; 12	NÜR1; 2; 13	NÜR2; 1; 9	NÜR2; 2; 6	ZAN; 1; 6	ZAN; 2; 24	SAC; 1	SAC; 2	HOC; 1 Ret	HOC; 2; 10			12th	52
2019	Lechner Racing Team	HOC1; 1 Ret	HOC1; 2 Ret	MST; 1; 10	MST; 2; 20	RBR; 1 Ret	RBR; 2 DNS	NOR; 1; 4	NOR; 2; 7	ZAN; 1; 28	ZAN; 2; 5	NÜR; 1; 8	NÜR; 2; 18	HOC2; 1; 19	HOC2; 2 Ret	SAC; 1; 16	SAC; 2; 17	15th	42.5

=== Complete Porsche Carrera Cup France results ===
(key) (Races in bold indicate pole position) (Races in italics indicate fastest lap)

Year	Team	1	2	3	4	5	6	7	8	9	10	11	12	Pos	Points
2020	BWT Lechner Racing	MAG; 1; 3	MAG; 2; 2	LMS; 3	LEC; 1; 6	LEC; 2; 4	**LEC**; **3**; 1	SPA; 1; 5	SPA; 2; 4	CAT; 1; 3	CAT; 2 Ret			4th	152
2021	BWT Lechner Racing	MAG; 1; 6	MAG; 2; 6	LEC; 1; 3	LEC; 2; 5	SPA; 1; 11	SPA; 2; 9	MNZ; 1; 7	MNZ; 2 Ret	CAT; 1; 7	CAT; 2; 10	ALG; 1; 6	ALG; 2; 6	5th	120

=== Complete Porsche Supercup results ===
(key) (Races in bold indicate pole position) (Races in italics indicate fastest lap)

Year	Team	1	2	3	4	5	6	7	8	9	10	DC	Points
2018	Momo Megatron Lechner Racing Team	CAT	MON	RBR	SIL; 20	HOC	HUN	SPA	MNZ	MEX	MEX	NC†	0†
2019	Lechner Racing Middle East	CAT	MON	RBR; 19	SIL; 15	HOC	HUN; 13	SPA; 14	MNZ	MEX	MEX	NC†	0
2020	Lechner Racing Middle East	RBR; 6	RBR; 8	HUN; 5	SIL; 10	SIL; 5	CAT; Ret	SPA; 9	MNZ; 6			9th	65
2021	BWT Lechner Racing	MON; Ret	RBR; 9	RBR; 8	HUN; 12	SPA; 14	ZND; 20	MNZ; 17	MNZ; 18			13th	30

^{†} As Simmenauer was a guest driver, he was ineligible to score points.

=== Complete GT World Challenge Europe results ===
==== GT World Challenge Europe Endurance Cup ====
(key) (Races in bold indicate pole position) (Races in italics indicate fastest lap)

Year	Team	Car	Class	1	2	3	4	5	6	7	Pos.	Points
2022	ROFGO Racing with Team WRT	Audi R8 LMS Evo II	Silver	IMO; 14	**LEC**; 15	SPA; 6H; 15	SPA; 12H; 19	SPA; 24H; 13	**HOC**; 10	CAT; 11	1st	125
2023	BMW M Team WRT	BMW M4 GT3	Gold	MNZ; 12	LEC; Ret	SPA; 6H; 20	SPA; 12H; 18	SPA; 24H; 14	NÜR; 16	CAT; 21	5th	78
2026	CSA Racing	McLaren 720S GT3 Evo	Silver	LEC	MNZ	SPA; 6H	SPA; 12H	SPA; 24H	NÜR; Ret	ALG; 34	NC	0

==== GT World Challenge Europe Sprint Cup ====
(key) (Races in bold indicate pole position) (Races in italics indicate fastest lap)

Year	Team	Car	Class	1	2	3	4	5	6	7	8	9	10	Pos.	Points
2022	Belgian Audi Club Team WRT	Audi R8 LMS Evo II	Pro	BRH; 1 Ret	BRH; 2; 14	MAG; 1; 9	MAG; 2; 4	ZAN; 1; 9	ZAN; 2; 23	MIS; 1; 6	MIS; 2; 4	VAL; 1; 10	VAL; 2; 22	9th	22
2023	BMW M Team WRT	BMW M4 GT3	Pro	BRH; 1; 13	BRH; 2; 15	MIS; 1; 15	MIS; 2; 3	HOC; 1; 11	HOC; 2; 11	VAL; 1; 16	VAL; 2; 29	ZAN; 1; 7	ZAN; 2; 13	11th	12.5

=== Complete European Le Mans Series results ===
(key) (Races in bold indicate pole position) (Races in italics indicate fastest lap)

Year	Entrant	Class	Chassis	Engine	1	2	3	4	5	6	Rank	Points
2024	Duqueine Team	LMP2	Oreca 07	Gibson GK428 4.2 L V8	CAT; 11	LEC; 6	IMO; 9	SPA; 12	MUG; 8	ALG; 7	16th	20
2025	Inter Europol Competition	LMP2	Oreca 07	Gibson GK428 4.2 L V8	CAT; 9	LEC; 10	IMO; 6	SPA; 5	SIL; 9	ALG; Ret	12th	23

=== Complete 24 Hours of Le Mans results ===
Year	Team	Co-Drivers	Car	Class	Laps	Pos.	Class pos.
2024	(France) Duqueine Team	(Australia) James Allen (United States) John Falb	Oreca 07-Gibson	LMP2	112	DNF	DNF
2024	(France) Duqueine Team	(Australia) James Allen (United States) John Falb	Oreca 07-Gibson	LMP2 Pro-Am	112	DNF	DNF
2025	(Poland) Inter Europol Competition	(United States) Nick Boulle (Italy) Luca Ghiotto	Oreca 07-Gibson	LMP2	363	27th	10th
2025	(Poland) Inter Europol Competition	(United States) Nick Boulle (Italy) Luca Ghiotto	Oreca 07-Gibson	LMP2 Pro-Am	363	27th	5th

=== Complete Le Mans Cup results ===
(key) (Races in bold indicate pole position; races in italics indicate fastest lap)

Year	Entrant	Car	Class	1	2	3	4	5	6	Pos.	Points
2026	SMC Motorsport	McLaren 720S GT3 Evo	GT3	BAR; 3	LEC; 5	**LMS**; DSQ	SPA; 6	SIL; 6	**POR**; 2	7th	61

^{*} Season still in progress.

Sporting positions
Preceded by Alex Fontana; Ricardo Feller; Rolf Ineichen	GT World Challenge Europe Endurance Cup; Silver Cup Champion; 2022; With: Benjamin Goethe & Thomas Neubauer	Succeeded by Clemens Schmid; Glenn van Berlo; Benjamín Hites
