= Luis Leeds =

Australian - Indonesian racing driver (born 2000)

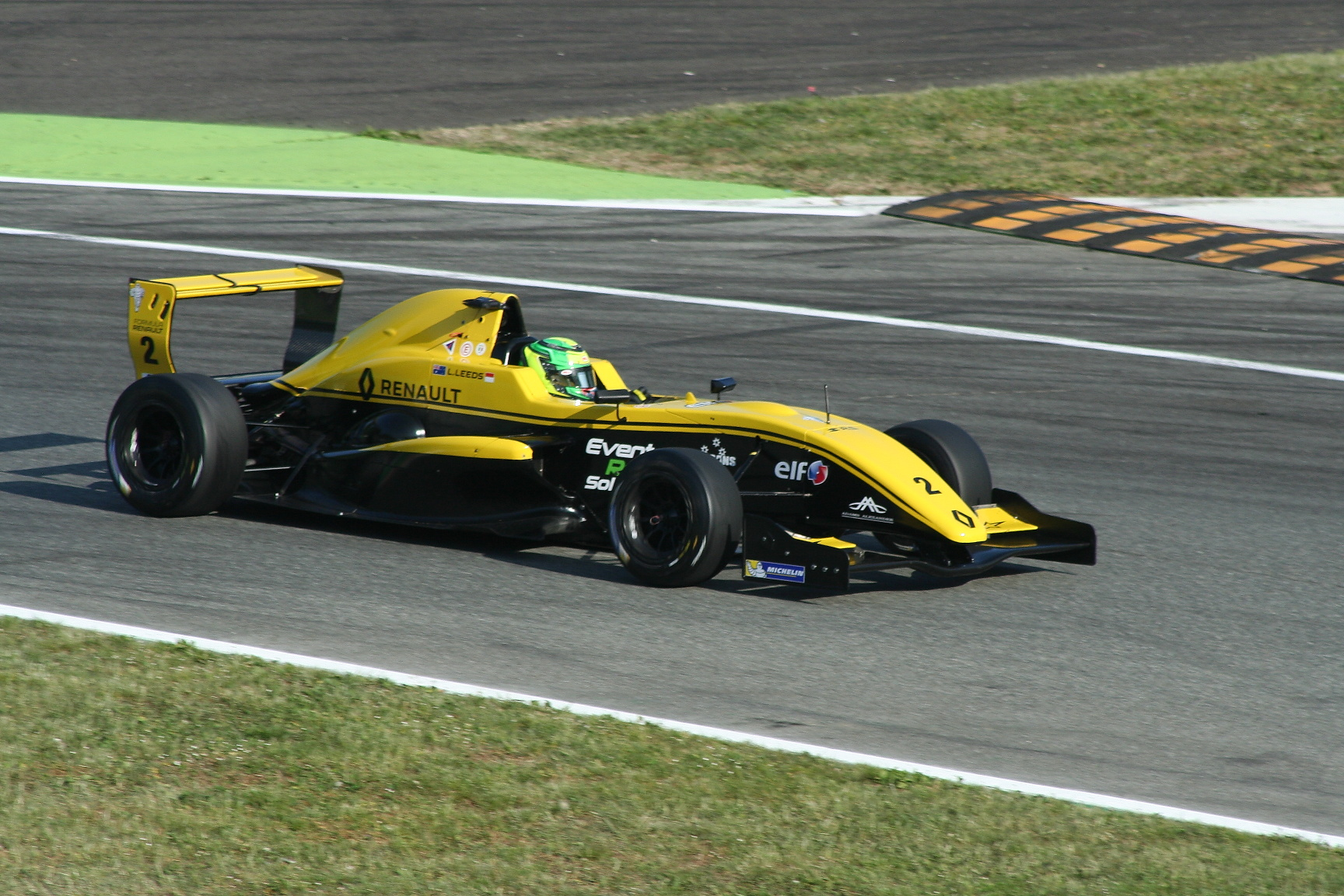
- Nationality: (Australia) Australian (Indonesia) Indonesian via dual nationality
- Born: Luis William Mahendra Leeds; 6 March 2000 (age 26) Melbourne, Australia

Australian Formula 4 Championship career
- Current team: AGI Sport
- Categorisation: FIA Silver
- Starts: 18
- Wins: 9
- Poles: 8
- Fastest laps: 8
- Best finish: 1st in 2019

Championship titles
- 2019: Australian Formula 4 Championship

Luis William Mahendra Leeds (born 6 March 2000) is an Australian-Indonesian racing driver who last competed in the Porsche GT3 Cup Challenge Australia Championship for Supercars Championship team 23Red Racing.

Leeds served as a member of the Red Bull Junior Team in 2016 and was also development driver for 23Red Racing.

== Career summary ==
=== Formula 4 ===
Leeds finished 2015 Australian Formula 4 Championship on the sixth place, competing for Dream Motorsport.

In 2016, Leeds became a member of the Red Bull Junior Team and moved to the United Kingdom to compete in F4 British Championship with TRS Arden Junior Racing Team. He ended the season third in the drivers standings with three wins, but it wasn't enough to keep the place in the RB Junior team.

=== Formula Renault ===
In 2017, Leeds joined Eurocup Formula Renault 2.0 with Josef Kaufmann Racing. He had two point-scoring finishes, his highest finishing position being seventh place at Silverstone.

=== Australian Formula 4 Championship 2019 ===
In 2019, Leeds raced with AGI Sport in Australian F4 Championship where he competed in eighteen races, finished on the podium seventeen times for nine wins, including the Australian F1 Grand Prix event to go with his other F1 event win at the Mexico F1 in 2015. Leeds went on to win the championship convincingly.

However due to uncertainty of future racing career and lack of funds, Leeds officially retired from racing at the age of 24 to pursue other opportunities.

== Personal life ==
Leeds was born on 6 March 2000 in Melbourne by Australian-Indonesian parentage. His mother, Maria Leeds (née Eni), is an Indonesian expatriate and his father Dean Leeds is from Australia. Leeds studied in Ngawi, Indonesia during his primary school days from 2006 until 2012 during his ancestral education career days. In 2012, Leeds was moved back to Australia to pursue his racing career.

Leeds is currently practicing Christian Protestant who attends Protestant prayer service both in Australia and Indonesia.

== Racing record ==
=== Career summary ===
Season	Series	Team	Races	Wins	Poles	F/laps	Podiums	Points	Position
2014–15	Toyota Finance 86 Championship	ETEC Motorsport	3	0	0	0	0	130	12th
2014–15	New Zealand Formula Ford Championship		3	1	0	1	2		
2015	Australian Formula 4 Championship	Dream Motorsport	21	0	0	1	6	183	6th
2015	Australian Formula Ford Series	Dream Motorsport	18	2	1	2	9	206	**3rd**
2015	New South Wales Formula Ford Fiesta Championship	Dream Motorsport	3	2	0	1	3	85	6th
2015	Victorian State Circuit Racing Formula Ford Championship	Dream Motorsport	9	5	1	3	7	258	**3rd**
2015	ADAC Formula 4 Championship	Luis Leeds	3	0	0	0	0	0	35th
2015–16	NACAM Formula 4 Championship	Ram Racing	1	1	1	0	1	0	NC
2016	F4 British Championship	TRS Arden Junior Racing Team	30	3	1	3	11	300	**3rd**
2016	Australian Formula 4 Championship	Dream Motorsport	3	1	0	0	2	40	11th
2016–17	NACAM Formula 4 Championship	Bernal Racing	2	0	0	0	0	0	NC†
2017	Formula Renault Eurocup	Josef Kaufmann Racing	22	0	0	1	0	7	19th
2017	Formula Renault NEC	Josef Kaufmann Racing	2	0	0	0	0	28	17th
2017	Toyota Racing Series	Giles Motorsport	15	0	0	0	0	419	13th
2017	Australian Formula 4 Championship	Zagame Motorsport Juniors	3	0	0	0	0	18	14th
2018	Porsche GT3 Cup Challenge Australia	23Red Racing	12	0	0	2	2	298	10th
2019	Australian Formula 4 Championship	AGI Sport	18	9	4	8	17	365	**1st**
2019	Formula 4 South East Asia Championship	Meritus GP	0	0	0	0	0	0	NC
2019	FIA Motorsport Games Formula 4 Cup	Team Australia	1	0	0	0	0	N/A	4th
2021	S5000 Australian Drivers Championship	Garry Rogers Motorsport	12	0	0	0	4	316	6th
2021	S5000 Tasman Series	AGI Sport with GRM	6	0	0	0	2	105	4th

^{†} As Leeds was a guest driver, he was ineligible for points.

=== Complete Australian Formula 4 Championship results ===
(key) (Races in bold indicate pole position) (Races in italics indicate fastest lap)

Year	Team	1	2	3	4	5	6	7	8	9	10	11	12	13	14	15	16	17	18	19	20	21	DC	Points
2015	Dream Motorsport	TOW; 1; 3	TOW; 2; 6	TOW; 3 Ret	QLD; 1; 4	QLD; 2; 3	QLD; 3; 6	SMP; 1; 3	SMP; 2; 4	SMP; 3; 10	SAN; 1; 9	SAN; 2; 6	SAN; 3; 2	SUR; 1; 5	SUR; 2; 4	SUR; 3; 2	PHI; 1; 10	PHI; 2; 4	PHI; 3; 3	SYD; 1 Ret	SYD; 2 Ret	SYD; 3 Ret	6th	183
2016	Dream Motorsport	SYM; 1	SYM; 2	SYM; 3	PHI; 1	PHI; 2	PHI; 3	SMP; 1; 3	SMP; 2 Ret	SMP; 3; 1	QLD; 1	QLD; 2	QLD; 3	SAN; 1	SAN; 2	SAN; 3	SUR; 1	SUR; 2	SUR; 3				11th	40
2017	Zagame Motorsport Juniors	SAN1; 1	SAN1; 2	SAN1; 3	SAN2; 1	SAN2; 2	SAN2; 3	BAR; 1	BAR; 2	BAR; 3	PHI; 1	PHI; 2	PHI; 3	QLD; 1	QLD; 2	QLD; 3	SYD; 1	SYD; 2	SYD; 3	SUR; 1; 7	SUR; 2 Ret	SUR; 3; 4	14th	18
2019	AGI Sport	**MEL**; **1**; 1	MEL; 2; 9	MEL; 3; 2	**SYD**; **1**; 1	SYD; 2; 2	**SYD**; **3**; 2	**PHI1**; **1**; 1	PHI1; 2; 2	**PHI1**; **3**; 2	**PHI2**; **1**; 1	PHI2; 2; 2	**PHI2**; **3**; 1	BEN1; 1; 1	BEN1; 2; 3	BEN1; 3; 3	BEN2; 1; 2	BEN2; 2; 1	**BEN2**; **3**; 1				1st	365

=== Complete ADAC Formula 4 Championship results ===
(key) (Races in bold indicate pole position) (Races in italics indicate fastest lap)

Year	Team	1	2	3	4	5	6	7	8	9	10	11	12	13	14	15	16	17	18	19	20	21	22	23	24	DC	Points
2015	Luis Leeds	OSC; 1	OSC; 2	OSC; 3	RBR; 1	RBR; 2	RBR; 3	SPA; 1	SPA; 2	SPA; 3	LAU; 1	LAU; 2	LAU; 3	NÜR; 1	NÜR; 2	NÜR; 3	SAC; 1	SAC; 2	SAC; 3	OSC; 1	OSC; 2	OSC; 3	HOC; 1; 26	HOC; 2; 18	HOC; 3; 11	36th	0

=== Complete F4 British Championship results ===
(key) (Races in bold indicate pole position; races in italics indicate fastest lap)

Year	Team	1	2	3	4	5	6	7	8	9	10	11	12	13	14	15	16	17	18	19	20	21	22	23	24	25	26	27	28	29	30	DC	Points
2016	TRS Arden Junior Racing Team	BHI; 1; 4	BHI; 2; 9	BHI; 3; 2	DON; 1; 2	DON; 2 Ret	DON; 3; 2	THR; 1; 5	THR; 2; 1	THR; 3; 8	OUL; 1; 13	OUL; 2; 8	OUL; 3; 11	CRO; 1; 3	CRO; 2; 1	CRO; 3; 10	SNE; 1; 5	SNE; 2; 17	SNE; 3; 4	KNO; 1; 5	KNO; 2; 1	KNO; 3; 2	ROC; 1; 7	ROC; 2; 2	ROC; 3; 10	SIL; 1; 8	SIL; 2; 3	**SIL**; **3**; 2	BHGP; 1; 10	BHGP; 2; 11	BHGP; 3; 5	3rd	300

=== Complete Toyota Racing Series results ===
Year	Team	1	2	3	4	5	6	7	8	9	10	11	12	13	14	15	Pos	Points
2017	Giles Motorsport	RUA; 1; 15	RUA; 2; 11	RUA; 3; 13	TER; 1; 16	TER; 2; 10	TER; 3; 14	HMP; 1; 13	HMP; 2; 19	HMP; 3; 5	TAU; 1; 9	TAU; 2; 8	TAU; 3; 12	MAN; 1; 9	MAN; 2; 9	MAN; 3 Ret	13th	419

=== Complete New Zealand Grand Prix results ===
Year	Team	Car	Qualifying	Main race
2017	(New Zealand) Giles Motorsport	Tatuus FT-50 - Toyota	17th	DNF

=== Complete Formula Renault NEC results ===
(key) (Races in bold indicate pole position) (Races in italics indicate fastest lap)

Year	Entrant	1	2	3	4	5	6	7	8	9	10	11	DC	Points
2017	Josef Kaufmann Racing	MNZ; 1	MNZ; 2	ASS; 1	ASS; 2	NÜR; 1; 4	NÜR; 2; 10	SPA; 1; 29	SPA; 2; 23	SPA; 3 Ret	HOC; 1	HOC; 2	19th	28

=== Complete Formula Renault Eurocup results ===
(key) (Races in bold indicate pole position) (Races in italics indicate fastest lap)

Year	Team	1	2	3	4	5	6	7	8	9	10	11	12	13	14	15	16	17	18	19	20	21	22	23	Pos	Points
2017	Josef Kaufmann Racing	MNZ; 1; 25	MNZ; 2 Ret	SIL; 1; 23	SIL; 2; 7	PAU; 1; 18	PAU; 2; 16	MON; 1; 14	MON; 2; 11	HUN; 1 Ret	HUN; 2 Ret	HUN; 3; 26	NÜR; 1; 14	NÜR; 2; 10	RBR; 1; 19	RBR; 2; 24	LEC; 1; 18	LEC; 2; 18	SPA; 1; 29	SPA; 2; 23	SPA; 3 Ret	CAT; 1; 29	CAT; 2 Ret	CAT; 3; 23	19th	7

=== Complete FIA Motorsport Games results ===
Year	Entrant	Cup	Qualifying	Quali Race	Main race
2019	Team Australia	**Formula 4**	5th	8th	4th

=== Complete S5000 Australian Drivers' Championship results ===
Year	Series	Team	1	2	3	4	5	6	7	8	9	10	11	12	13	14	Position	Points
2020	Australian	AGI Sport	APC; R1; PO	APC; R2; PO	SMP; R3; C	SMP; R4; C	WIN; R5; C	WIN; R6; C	BMP; R7; C	BMP; R8; C	PHI; R9; C	PHI; R10; C	SAN; R11; C	SAN; R12; C	BAT; NC1; C	BAT; NC2; C	–	–
2021	Australian	Garry Rogers Motorsport	SYM; R1; 6	SYM; R2; 2	SYM; R3; 7	PHI; R4; 6	PHI; R5; 7	PHI; R6; 5	SAN; R7; 6	SAN; R8; 6	SAN; R9; 3	SMP; R10; 3	SMP; R11; 7	SMP; R12; 2			6th	316
2021	Tasman	AGI Sport with GRM	SMP; R1; 2	SMP; R2; 6	SMP; R3; 5	BAT; R4; Ret	BAT; R5; 3	BAT; R6; 4	BAT; R7; C								4th	75

Sporting positions
Preceded by Jayden Ojeda	Australian Formula 4 Championship; Champion; 2019	Succeeded by James Piszcyk
