= Nikita Lastochkin =

Russian racing driver

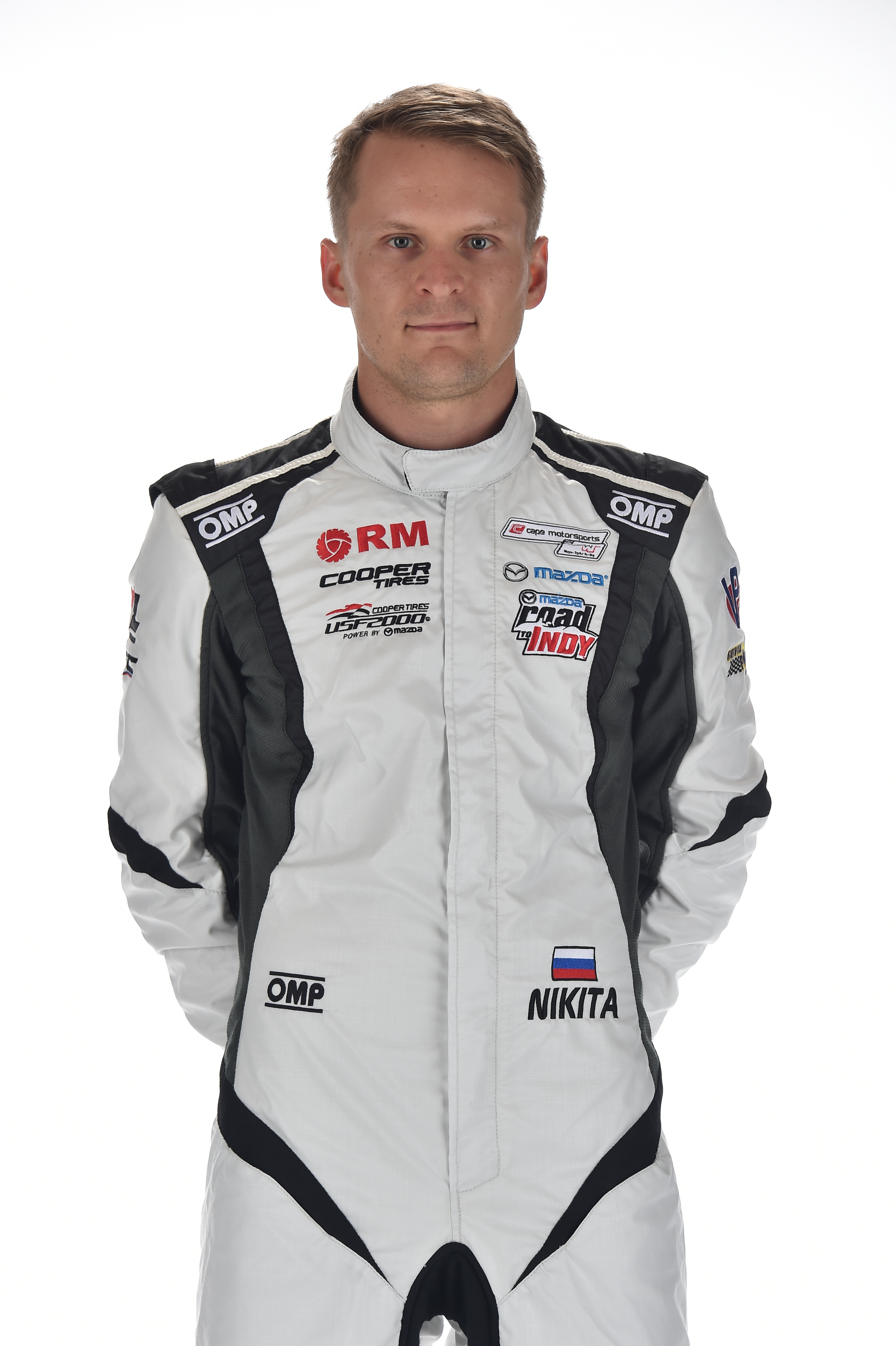
- Nationality: (Russia) Russian
- Born: Nikita Yuryevich Lastochkin; 5 May 1990 (age 36) Rybinsk, Russia
- Categorisation: FIA Silver

Nikita Yuryevich Lastochkin (born May 5, 1990) is a Russian racing driver, who moved to the United States at the age of sixteen, and currently resides in Los Angeles, California.

== Career ==
Lastochkin began racing in 2013, where he completed the three-day Skip Barber Racing School and went on to race in the Championship. That year, he placed second in the Winter Championship and awarded “Most Improved.” He also participated in the 2014 Summer Racing Series, where he placed third in the Championship. In 2014, Lastochkin also competed in the Pacific Region F1600 Championship Series, with PR1 where he claimed two wins. He then moved to the Atlantic Region with Team Pelfrey, where he would place sixth overall in the F1600 Championship Series; with two podiums, a pole position and a lap record at Watkins Glen International.

== Racing record ==
=== Career summary ===
Season	Series	Team	Races	Wins	Poles	F/Laps	Podiums	Points	Position
2012-13	SBF2000 Winter Series	Skip Barber Racing School	6	0	?	?	0	126	23rd
2013-14	Skip Barber Winter Series	Skip Barber Racing School	18	7	5	10	14	320	2nd
2014	F1600 Championship Series	WISKO Racing	15	0	1	0	2	360	6th
2014	SBF2000 Summer Series	Skip Barber Racing School	22	3	5	2	11	393	3rd
2014	Pacific Formula F1600	PR1/Russkaya Mekhanika	4	2	4	4	2	112	1st
2015	U.S. F2000 National Championship	Team Pelfrey	16	0	0	0	0	193	8th
2015	U.S. F2000 Winterfest	Team Pelfrey	5	0	0	0	0	66	9th
2016	U.S. F2000 National Championship	Cape Motorsports Wayne Taylor Racing	15	0	0	0	0	183	8th
2017	Toyota Racing Series	Victory Motor Racing	15	0	0	0	0	263	18th
2017	Pro Mazda Championship	Team Pelfrey	12	0	0	0	2	203	5th
2018	Pro Mazda Championship	Cape Motorsports	16	0	0	0	0	209	9th
2019	Indy Pro 2000 Championship	Exclusive Autosport	16	0	0	0	0	237	6th
2021	Indy Lights	HMD Motorsports	12	0	0	0	0	123	13th
2024	Michelin Pilot Challenge - GS	Czabok-Simpson Motorsport	5	0	0	0	0	870	27th
2025	Michelin Pilot Challenge - GS	Czabok-Simpson Motorsport	6	0	0	0	0	980	30th
2026	Porsche Carrera Cup North America	Czabok-Simpson Motorsport	16	0	0	0	0	84	10th

 Season in progress

=== F1600 Championship Series ===
Year	Team	1	2	3	4	5	6	7	8	9	10	11	12	13	14	Rank	Points
2014	Team Pelfrey	ATL	ATL	WAT; 9	WAT; 5	VIR; 6	VIR; 3	MOH; 3	MOH; 17	PIT; 4	PIT; 8	TSMP; 7	TSMP; 4	WAT; 4	WAT; 12	6th	360

=== U.S. F2000 National Championship - Winterfest ===
Year	Team	1	2	3	4	5	Rank	Points
2015	Team Pelfrey	NOL; 8	NOL; 11	NOL; 13	BAR; 12	BAR; 8	9th	66

=== U.S. F2000 National Championship ===
Year	Team	1	2	3	4	5	6	7	8	9	10	11	12	13	14	15	16	Rank	Points
2015	Team Pelfrey	STP; 10	STP; 8	NOL; 10	NOL; 12	BAR; 10	BAR; 8	IMS; 8	IMS; 7	LOR; 12	TOR; 8	TOR; 8	MOH; 11	MOH; 10	MOH; 10	LAG; 7	LAG; 5	7th	193
2016	Cape Motorsports Wayne Taylor Racing	STP; 9	STP; 7	BAR; 7	BAR; 5	IMS; 23	IMS; 11	LOR	ROA; 6	ROA; 8	TOR; 17	TOR; 6	MOH; 6	MOH; 7	MOH; 8	LAG; 11	LAG; 6	8th	183

=== Pro Mazda Championship ===
Year	Team	1	2	3	4	5	6	7	8	9	10	11	12	13	14	15	16	Rank	Points
2017	Team Pelfrey	STP; 5	STP; 5	IMS; 6	IMS; 5	ROA; 3	ROA; 3	MOH; 5	MOH; 5	MOH; 6	GMP; 6	WGL; 13	WGL; 4					5th	203
2018	Cape Motorsports	STP; 8	STP; 7	BAR; 11	BAR; 11	IMS; 6	IMS; 9	LOR; 9	ROA; 12	ROA; 11	TOR; 5	TOR; 4	MOH; 11	MOH; 8	GMP; 11	POR; 7	POR; 4	9th	209
2019	Exclusive Autosport	STP; 5	STP; 7	IMS; 7	IMS; 4	LOR; 11	ROA; 5	ROA; 5	TOR; 10	TOR; 8	MOH; 4	MOH; 7	GTW; 8	PIR; 6	PIR; 9	LAG; 9	LAG; 13	6th	237

==== Indy Lights ====
Year	Team	1	2	3	4	5	6	7	8	9	10	11	12	13	14	15	16	17	18	19	20	Rank	Points
2021	HMD Motorsports	ALA; 11	ALA; 9	STP; 8	STP; 11	IMS; 13	IMS; 13	DET; 9	DET; 9	RDA; 12	RDA; 11	MOH; 12	MOH; 11	GTW	GTW	POR	POR	LAG	LAG	MOH	MOH	13th	123
