= Kennett (name) =

Kennett is a surname and a given name. Notable people with the name include:

== Surname ==
- Barney Kennett (born 1955), English speedway rider
- Basil Kennett (1674–1715), English cleric, college president
- Beth Kennett (born 1964), American politician
- Bob Kennett (fl. 1967–1970), New Zealand-American racing car driver
- Brackley Kennett (fl. 1765–1781), English Sheriff & Lord Mayor of London
- Brady Kennett (born 1974), New Zealander racing car driver
- Brian Kennett (born 1948), English-Australian seismologist
- Kennett Bros (fl. 1986–2014), New Zealand mountain bikers, event organisers, authors
- Edward Kennett (born 1986), British speedway rider
- Fred Kennett (1908–1994), Australian rules football player
- Gordon Kennett (1953–2023), British speedway rider
- Houn Jiyu-Kennett (1924–1996), English rōshi
- Jeff Kennett (born 1948), Australian politician
- Luther Martin Kennett (1807–1873), US politician
- Muriel Kennett Wales (1913–2009), Irish-Canadian mathematician
- Murray Kennett (born 1952), Canadian hockey player
- Paul Kennett (fl. 1992), British rugby league footballer
- Rick Kennett (born 1956), Australian author
- Robert Hatch "R.H." Kennett (1864–1932) English professor of Hebrew
- Todd P. Kennett (born 1969), US rowing coach
- White Kennett (1660–1728), English bishop, antiquarian

== Given name ==
- Kennett B. Dawson (1896–1961), American politician from California
- William Kennett Loftus (1820–1858), English geologist, naturalist, explorer, archaeological excavator
- Kennett Love (1924–2013), American journalist
- John Kennett Starnes (1918–2014), Canadian civil servant, diplomat, novelist
- Kennett Watkins (1847–1933), New Zealand painter

== See also ==
- Kennette Benedict, American academic
