= Kennett =

Kennett may refer to:

== Places ==
=== Settlements ===
- Kennett, California
- Kennett, Cambridgeshire, England
- Kennett, Missouri
- Kennett River, Victoria, town in Australia
- Kennett Township, Chester County, Pennsylvania
- West Kennett and East Kennett, villages in Wiltshire, England

=== Mountains ===
- Mount Kennett, mountain in Antarctica
- Kennett Ridge, ridge in Antarctica

=== Rivers ===
- Kennett River (disambiguation)
- River Kennett, Suffolk and Cambridgeshire, England

=== Other locations ===
- Kennett Square, Pennsylvania, a borough
- Kennett Memorial Airport, Missouri
- Old Kennett Meetinghouse, Kennett Township, Pennsylvania

== People ==
- Kennett (name), a surname and given name

== Other uses ==
- Kennett High School (disambiguation)
- Bryan v. Kennett, court case

== See also ==
- Kennet (disambiguation)
