= Kennet =

Kennet may refer to:

== Places in the United Kingdom ==
- Kennet, Clackmannanshire, Scotland

== People ==
- Baron Kennet, a title in the Peerage of the United Kingdom
- D. Mark Kennet (born 1957), American economist
- Josh Kennet (born 1987), English-Israeli footballer
- Kennet Ahl, pseudonym of Swedish crime novelist duo Lasse Strömstedt and Christer Dahl
- Robert Bruce, Lord Kennet (1718–1785), Scottish advocate, legal scholar and judge
- Kennet Eichhorn (born 2009), German footballer

== Other uses ==
- Kennet River (disambiguation)
- River Kennet, Wiltshire and Berkshire, England
- Kennet (district), former local government district in Wiltshire, England
- Kennet (HM Prison), Merseyside, England
- Kennet and Avon Canal, southern England
- Kennet Avenue, prehistoric site in Wiltshire, England
- Kennet Partners, private equity firm based in London, England
- Kennet School, school in Thatcham, Berkshire, England
- HMS Kennet (1903), destroyer in the Royal Navy
- Kennet, a GWR 3031 Class locomotive of the Great Western Railway, England

== See also ==
- Kennett (disambiguation)
