= 1998 New Zealand Grand Prix =

Race details
- Date: 6 December 1998
- Official name: XLIV New Zealand Grand Prix
- Location: Ruapana Park, Christchurch, New Zealand
- Course: Permanent racing facility
- Course length: 2.841 km (1.765 miles)
- Distance: 34 laps, 96.6 km (60 miles)
- Weather: Light rain/overcast

Pole position
Driver	(New Zealand) Scott Dixon	SH Racing
- Time: 1:15.782

Fastest lap
Driver	(New Zealand) Greg Murphy	Greg Murphy Racing
- Time: 1:17.031 on lap 32

Podium
First	(New Zealand) Simon Wills	Birrana Racing
Second	(New Zealand) Scott Dixon	SH Racing
Third	(New Zealand) Greg Murphy	Greg Murphy Racing

The 1998 New Zealand Grand Prix event for open wheel racing cars was held at Ruapana Park near Christchurch on 6 December 1998. This event marked the events return after a two-year hiatus. It was the forty-fourth New Zealand Grand Prix and was the first to be run to Formula Holden regulations. The event also served as part of the briefly revived Tasman Series.

The event was won by Simon Wills driving for Birrana Racing, while Scott Dixon and Greg Murphy rounded out the podium.

== Background ==
Ever since the inaugural event in 1950, the New Zealand Grand Prix had attracted some of the best racing drivers from home and abroad, with the honours roll consisting of some of the greatest drivers in the sports history. However, by the turn of the 1990s, the relevance of the event began to wane and eventually culminated in the 1995 iteration only receiving seven entries. The event would lay dormant for two years before making its return in 1998, with the aim to restore the status of the marquee event back to its golden years.

Running to Formula Holden regulations, the grid contained drivers from a mixture of different backgrounds. This included front-running drivers in the Australian Drivers' Championship, which also utilised Formula Holden cars. An array of local drivers were also entered, one of whom was former All Blacks player, Graham Sims. There were also three international drivers, which included Wouter van Eeuwijk from the Netherlands, Robert Lechner from Austria and Akihiro Asai from Japan, who had also been running in the Australian Drivers' Championship that season.

The favourites heading into the event were Greg Murphy and Scott Dixon. Murphy had won the 1994 iteration of the event and by this stage was an established driver throughout the Australasian motor racing scene. Dixon was still in his formative years of racing but had won the national Formula First and Formula Ford championships back-to-back. He had also competed in the Australian Drivers' Championship the previous year, finishing third, and would go on to win the championship later this year.

== Race report ==
Dixon once again proved his pace by securing the pole position, setting a time almost eight-tenths faster than the second-placed driver, Simon Wills. The Birrana Racing driver was regarded as a promising talent but compared to the likes of Dixon especially, had a disappointing season in British Formula Three and was thus never regarded as a favourite for the race. The preliminary race held on Saturday and Wills defied the critics by capitalising on a mistake from Dixon to take victory. Dixon had not only lost places to Wills off the start, but also to Murphy. Australian-based Kiwi Chris Staff spun on lap two, losing a bundle of positions while Dixon eventually wormed his way past Murphy at turn one a couple laps later. Dixon left Murphy behind but Wills was able to stabilise the gap and even with having to negotiate traffic every so often, never ceded position to the fast-charging Dixon. With a couple laps remaining, Dixon resigned himself to second place and Wills crossed to line 3.3 seconds ahead of his fellow Aucklander.

Two drivers - Lechner and Ross Rutherford - would be forced to withdraw from the race. Lechner owing to internal disputes with NRC Racing while Rutherford was thwarted by a lack of spare parts. Minutes before the start, light rain started to fall upon the circuit. This made track conditions quite slippery and resulted in Murphy and Asai spinning on the formation lap. Off the line, Dixon once again got a poor start and lost a bundle of positions. Wills shot through to the lead while van Eeuwijk scythed through to second place. The elation for the Dutchman was short-lived as he would be taken out of the race by Murphy at turn three on the first lap, with the Kiwi misjudging the track conditions. In the melee, Murphy fell right down the order while up the front, Dixon had worked his way up to Wills and passed him for the lead. Soon after, cars down the field began to drop out of the race. Sims had retired on lap four due to a faulty clutch while the Birrana car of Brenton Ramsay went out with a valve spring. Asai would once again be caught out by the conditions and retired from the race on lap 20.

Dixon had established an affirmative lead early on. However, as the race wore on, Wills began to rein him in. Feeling the pressure, Dixon ran wide at the first corner as Wills got to within one second of his lead. A couple corners later, Wills had taken the lead. Dixon, desperate to keep up, speared off the circuit just a couple corners later with the greasy track conditions catching him out. Once again, Dixon was forced to remain content with second place as, even without the mistake, Wills' pace was so absolute that, save for a mistake, the result was beyond doubt. Wills crossed the line to take victory with Dixon in second and Murphy a distant third.

== Classification ==
=== Qualifying ===
Pos	No.	Driver	Team	Time	Grid
1	35	(New Zealand) Scott Dixon	SH Racing	1:15.782	1
2	8	(New Zealand) Simon Wills	Birrana Racing	1:16.633	2
3	22	(New Zealand) Greg Murphy	Greg Murphy Racing	1:17.093	3
4	12	(Australia) Chris Staff	Challenge Recruitment Racing	1:17.475	4
5	7	(New Zealand) Jason Liefting	Ralt Australia	1:17.609	5
6	19	(Netherlands) Wouter van Eeuwijk	NRC Racing	1:17.637	6
7	74	(Japan) Akihiro Asai	Chris Hocking Racing	1:17.747	7
8	9	(Australia) Brenton Ramsay	Birrana Racing	1:18.570	8
9	6	(New Zealand) Graham Sims		1:20.904	9
10	15	(Australia) Les Crampton	Sun Wipes Formula Racing Team	1:22.161	10
11	24	(Australia) Ian Peters	Peters Racing	1:22.355	11
12	69	(Australia) Damien Digby	Damien Digby Racing	1:22.361	12
-	28	(Australia) Roger Oakshott	Barshott Racing	no time	13

=== Race ===
Pos	No.	Driver	Team	Laps	Time	Grid
1	8	(New Zealand) Simon Wills	Birrana Racing	34	48min 23.870sec	2
2	35	(New Zealand) Scott Dixon	SH Racing	34	+ 8.320	1
3	22	(New Zealand) Greg Murphy	Greg Murphy Racing	34	+ 24.491	3
4	7	(New Zealand) Jason Liefting	Ralt Australia	33	+ 1 lap	5
5	12	(Australia) Chris Staff	Challenge Recruitment Racing	32	+ 2 laps	4
6	15	(Australia) Les Crampton	Sun Wipes Formula Racing Team	31	+ 3 laps	10
7	69	(Australia) Damien Digby	Damien Digby Racing	30	+ 4 laps	12
8	24	(Australia) Ian Peters	Peters Racing	29	+ 5 laps	11
Ret	74	(Japan) Akihiro Asai	Chris Hocking Racing	20	Spun off	7
Ret	28	(Australia) Roger Oakshott	Barshott Racing	19	Retired	13
Ret	9	(Australia) Brenton Ramsay	Birrana Racing	10	Valve spring	8
Ret	6	(New Zealand) Graham Sims		4	Clutch	9
Ret	19	(Netherlands) Wouter van Eeuwijk	NRC Racing	0	Spun off	6
Wth		(Austria) Robert Lechner	NRC Racing		Withdrawn	
Wth		(New Zealand) Ross Rutherford			Withdrawn	
Fastest lap: Greg Murphy (Greg Murphy Racing) - 1:17.031 on lap 32

Preceded by 1995 New Zealand Grand Prix	New Zealand Grand Prix; 1998	Succeeded by 1999 New Zealand Grand Prix
