= 1995 New Zealand Grand Prix =

Race details
- Date: 8 January 1995
- Location: Manfeild Autocourse, Feilding, New Zealand
- Course: Permanent racing facility
- Course length: 3.033 km (1.885 miles)
- Distance: 27 laps, 81.891 km (50.895 miles)
- Weather: Overcast

Fastest lap
Driver	(New Zealand) Brady Kennett	Reynard 91D
- Time: 1:03.83

Podium
First	(New Zealand) Brady Kennett	Reynard 91D
Second	(New Zealand) Bryan Hartley	Dome 9102
Third	(United Kingdom) James Taylor	Reynard 91D

The 1995 New Zealand Grand Prix event for open wheel racing cars was held at Manfeild Autocourse near Feilding on 8 January 1995. It was the forty-third New Zealand Grand Prix and was run to Formula Atlantic regulations. It also served as a round of the Lifespan Street Skills Motor Racing Series. It would also be the only New Zealand Grand Prix event to utilise the reverse layout of the Manfeild Autocourse.

The event was won by Brady Kennett with Bryan Hartley and James Taylor rounding out the podium. Due to the low grid numbers owing to dwindling interest in the championship, the New Zealand Grand Prix marquee would enter a hiatus until 1998.

== Background ==
The New Zealand Grand Prix had been a staple of the domestic motor racing scene since the first iteration in 1950. It continued to attracted a wealth of international driving talent through til the end of the 1980s. However, by the turn of the 1990s, the interest in the New Zealand Formula Pacific Championship began to fade and grid numbers began to shrink.

For 1995, the entry list for the Lifespan Street Skills Motor Racing Series did not extend beyond single digits and only attracted one international driver, James Taylor from the United Kingdom, who was forced to lease a new engine for his car after his previous one expired in the Pukekohe round a week prior. The most notable entry on the grid would be defending New Zealand Grand Prix winner, Greg Murphy.

For this weekend, the series organisers elected to utilise the reverse layout of the Manfeild Autocourse circuit. Given it was an unconventional layout and had never been done before or since for the marquee event, the reason behind this decision was unclear.

== Race report ==
Murphy topped the timing boards in practice and was heavily touted as the favourite for the race. He would also win the penultimate race that would determine the grid order for the main Grand Prix. In that event, he was followed the chequered flag by veteran, Ken Smith and would share the front row with him for the main event.

=== Grand Prix ===
Both Ken Smith Motorsport entries of Smith and Shane Drake would not start the race, with Drake's car encountering clutch issues. Smith's non-start would make this the first race in over 30 years he would not partake in.

Murphy led off the line and began to eek out an early lead. Such was the dominance of his outfit that by the end of the fifth lap, he held a 16 second lead over his nearest competitor. However, at the end of the main straight, his car encountered brake failure which also interfered with the throttle and sent his Reynard into the barrier at around 230km/h. His car subsequently went through the advertising hoarding sand into the wooded area that surrounded the circuit. Murphy emerged uninjured from the accident.

On the restart, only five cars remained. Bill Farmer led the field from Bryan Hartley and Brady Kennett. By the end of the next lap, Kennett had moved past Hartley and shortly afterwards, he would take advantage of a spinning Farmer to assume the lead of the race. From there, Kennett remained unopposed and would remain the leader until the chequered flag. Five seconds behind him was Hartley and James Taylor rounded out the podium.

== Race results ==
Pos	No.	Driver	Entrant	Vehicle	Laps	Time/Retired	Grid
1	6	(New Zealand) Brady Kennett	Mobil 1 New Zealand Ltd.	Reynard 91D-Holden	27		8
2	4	(New Zealand) Bryan Hartley	New Hardware Jeans & Activewear	Dome 9102-Holden	27	+ 5.0	4
3	3	(United Kingdom) James Taylor	European Technique	Reynard 91D-Holden	27		3
4	7	(New Zealand) Bill Farmer	New Hardware Jeans & Activewear	Dome 9102-Holden	26	+ 1 lap	6
5	8	(New Zealand) Maurice O'Reilly	Chicane Clothing Co.	Ralt RT4-YBM	24	+ 3 laps	7
Ret	1	(New Zealand) Greg Murphy	Greg Murphy Racing	Reynard 92D-Holden	6	Accident	1
DNS	2	(New Zealand) Shane Drake	Ken Smith Motorsport	Swift DB4-Ford	0	Did Not Start	5
DNS	11	(New Zealand) Ken Smith	Ken Smith Motorsport	Lola T9150-Holden	0	Did Not Start	2
DNS	14	(Australia) Barry Ward	Barry Ward	Lola T9150-Holden	0	Did Not Start	
DNA		(Australia) Paul Stokell			0	Did Not Attend	

== Aftermath ==
This race marked a low point for the New Zealand Grand Prix event. The low grid numbers as well as overall dwindling interest had diluted the event to the extent where, after 41 consecutive years of running the race, the New Zealand Grand Prix marquee would enter a hiatus that would last until 1998. The event would also be moved from Manfeild to Ruapuna and would not return to the Manawatū–Whanganui region until 2008.

Preceded by 1994 New Zealand Grand Prix	New Zealand Grand Prix; 1995	Succeeded by 1998 New Zealand Grand Prix
