= 1999 New Zealand Grand Prix =

Race details
- Date: 6 December 1999
- Official name: XLV New Zealand Grand Prix
- Location: Ruapana Park, Christchurch, New Zealand
- Course: Permanent racing facility
- Course length: 2.841 km (1.765 miles)
- Distance: 40 laps, 113.64 km (70.60 miles)
- Weather: Fine

Pole position
Driver	(New Zealand) Simon Wills	Birrana Racing
- Time: 1:16.587

Fastest lap
Driver	(New Zealand) Simon Wills	Birrana Racing
- Time: 1:16.584

Podium
First	(New Zealand) Simon Wills	Birrana Racing
Second	(New Zealand) Scott Dixon	SH Racing
Third	(New Zealand) Matt Halliday	Challenge Racing

The 1999 New Zealand Grand Prix event for open wheel racing cars was held at Ruapana Park near Christchurch on 6 December 1999. It was the forty-fifth New Zealand Grand Prix and was open to Formula Holden cars.

The event was won by Simon Wills for the second consecutive time. Likewise, Scott Dixon claimed second place, as he did in the previous years event. Matt Halliday rounded out the podium driving for Challenge Racing.

== Race report ==
Heading into the weekend, Wills and Dixon were regarded as the favourites, although the added presence of Craig Lowndes added intrigue to the marquee event. However, the three-time V8 Supercar champion encountered engine problems throughout practice. It wouldn't be until the latter stages of practice where these issues were at least partially rectified. Other drivers encountering engine issues were Andy Booth and Ian Peters.

Dixon qualified on pole position for the preliminary race, with he and Wills being the only drivers to set times in the 1:16 bracket. Pole position for the Grand Prix went to Wills after Dixon encountered a CV joint failure and was forced to start from fourth on the grid. Halliday was forced to abandon a late push lap after running off the road on a slow-down lap, damaging the radiators and forcing him into the pitlane. Wills' teammate, Brenton Ramsay, would take second in the session to make it an all-Birrana Racing front row for the Grand Prix.

Disaster struck early for Kevin Bell as the local driver was forced to withdraw after writing off his Reynard 91D in a self-inflicted crash in the warmup. In the preliminary race, Dixon led away at the start from Wills. On the next tour around, Wills attempted an overtake on his fellow Aucklander down into turn one. The pair collided and Dixon was sent into a spin. Dixon retreated to the pits and would eventually finish the race eleventh and two laps down. From that point on, Wills remained unchallenged to the flag and took the preliminary race win. A safety car was brought out midway through the race as Booth's stranded car was recovered. Down the pack, Lowndes squabbled with Halliday over the podium positions until the former was caught out by a backmarker and sent down the order. Ramsay held station to take second place despite an enormous amount of pressure put on by Halliday and Jason Liefting.

Along with Bell, Dean Cockerton and Mark Ellis withdrew from the event preceding the Grand Prix. Wills led the field away from the line and an incident caused by Christian Murchison at the hairpin allowed the likes of Wills, Halliday and Dixon to breakaway from the field immediately. Murchison received a drive-through penalty for his misdemeanor. Dixon passed Halliday for second place on lap two and set off for Wills in hot pursuit. Immediately however, it was apparent that the Birrana racer was in a class of one that day. The gap never dipping under the three second bracket and the pair left to negotiate a lonely, processional race. Unbeknownst to the watching public, an array of cars were experiencing issues. Dixon's car suffered an intermittent misfire with faulty electrics. Although he conceded that Wills would have been nigh on impossible to catch and overtake regardless. Halliday's front wing had worked its way loose at some point during the race, drastically reducing the downforce on his car. Nevertheless, the youngster was able to bring his Challenge Racing car home in third. Liefting's car meanwhile was experiencing overheating issues and drastically reduced its power down the straights. Crowd favourite Lowndes came home a disappointing eighth while 17-year old prospect Paul Dumbrell finished an admirable sixth.

== Classification ==
=== Qualifying ===
Pos	No.	Driver	Team	Time	Grid
1	8	(New Zealand) Simon Wills	Birrana Racing	1:16.587	1
2	9	(Australia) Brenton Ramsay	Birrana Racing	1:16.974	2
3	12	(New Zealand) Matt Halliday	Challenge Racing	1:17.161	3
4	35	(New Zealand) Scott Dixon	SH Racing	1:17.373	4
5	25	(New Zealand) Jason Liefting	NRC International	1:17.428	5
6	75	(New Zealand) Andy Booth	Hocking Motorsport	1:17.647	6
7	11	(Australia) Craig Lowndes	Challenge Racing	1:17.933	7
8	7	(Australia) Paul Dumbrell	Wynns Racing	1:17.985	8
9	10	(New Zealand) Kevin Bell	ENZED Racing	1:18.793	9
10	74	(Japan) Yudai Igarashi	Hocking Motorsport	1:18.993	10
11	66	(Australia) Peter Hill	Greg Murphy Racing	1:19.705	11
12	69	(New Zealand) Daynom Templeman	Greg Murphy Racing	1:19.797	12
13	24	(Australia) Ian Peters	Peters Racing	1:20.844	13
14	15	(Australia) Les Crampton		1:20.899	14
15	8	(New Zealand) Dean Cockerton		1:21.660	15
16	17	(Australia) Mark Ellis		1:21.688	16
17	40	(New Zealand) Stan Redman		1:22.616	17
18	28	(Australia) Roger Oakeshott		1:23.555	18
19	18	(New Zealand) Jim Turnbull		1:28.758	19
20	25	(Singapore) Christian Murchison		1:30.853	20

=== Race ===
Pos	No.	Driver	Team	Laps	Time	Grid
1	8	(New Zealand) Simon Wills	Birrana Racing	34	43min 47.174sec	1
2	35	(New Zealand) Scott Dixon	SH Racing	34	+ 8.593	4
3	12	(New Zealand) Matt Halliday	Challenge Racing	34	+ 25.533	2
4	25	(New Zealand) Jason Liefting	NRC International	34	+ 36.176	5
5	9	(Australia) Brenton Ramsay	Birrana Racing	34	+ 1:11.852	2
6	7	(Australia) Paul Dumbrell	Wynns Racing	33	+ 1 lap	8
7	24	(Australia) Ian Peters	Peters Racing	33	+ 1 lap	
8	11	(Australia) Craig Lowndes	Challenge Racing	33	+ 1 lap	
9	25	(Singapore) Christian Murchison		33	+ 1 lap	
10	15	(Australia) Les Crampton		33	+ 1 lap	
11	69	(New Zealand) Daynom Templeman	Greg Murphy Racing	32	+ 2 laps	
12	40	(New Zealand) Stan Redman		31	+ 3 laps	
13	18	(New Zealand) Jim Turnbull		30	+ 4 laps	
14	28	(Australia) Roger Oakeshott		29	+ 5 laps	
Ret	75	(New Zealand) Andy Booth	Hocking Motorsport	29	Retired	
Ret	74	(Japan) Yudai Igarashi	Hocking Motorsport	8	Retired	
Ret	66	(Australia) Peter Hill	Greg Murphy Racing	5	Retired	
DNS	10	(New Zealand) Kevin Bell	ENZED Racing	0	Warmup crash	9
DNS	8	(New Zealand) Dean Cockerton		0	Did Not Start	15
DNS	17	(Australia) Mark Ellis		0	Did Not Start	16
Fastest lap: Simon Wills (Brianna Racing) - 1:16.584

Preceded by 1998 New Zealand Grand Prix	New Zealand Grand Prix; 1999	Succeeded by 2000 New Zealand Grand Prix
