= Moulton, Suffolk =

Village in Suffolk, England

Coordinates: 52.251°N 0.4875°E

Moulton
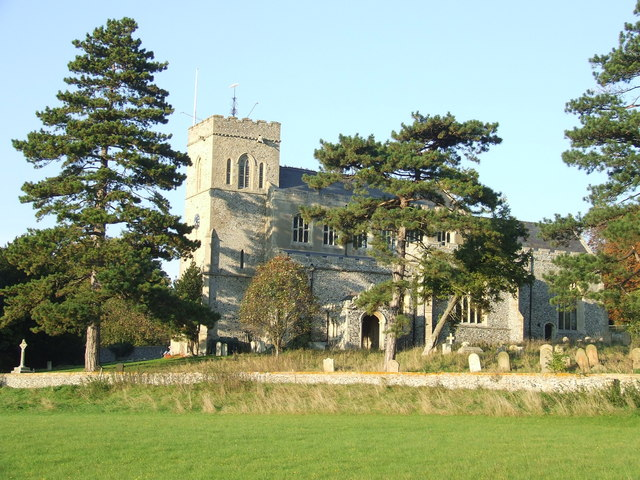
- Moulton, Church of St Peter

- Location within Suffolk
- Area: 12.92 km^{2} (4.99 sq mi)
- Population: 1,033 (2011)
  - Density: 80/km^{2} (210/sq mi)
- OS grid reference: TL699643
- District: West Suffolk
- Shire county: Suffolk
- Region: East
- Country: England
- Sovereign state: United Kingdom
- Post town: NEWMARKET
- Postcode district: CB8
- Dialling code: 01638
- Police: Suffolk
- Fire: Suffolk
- Ambulance: East of England
- UK Parliament: West Suffolk

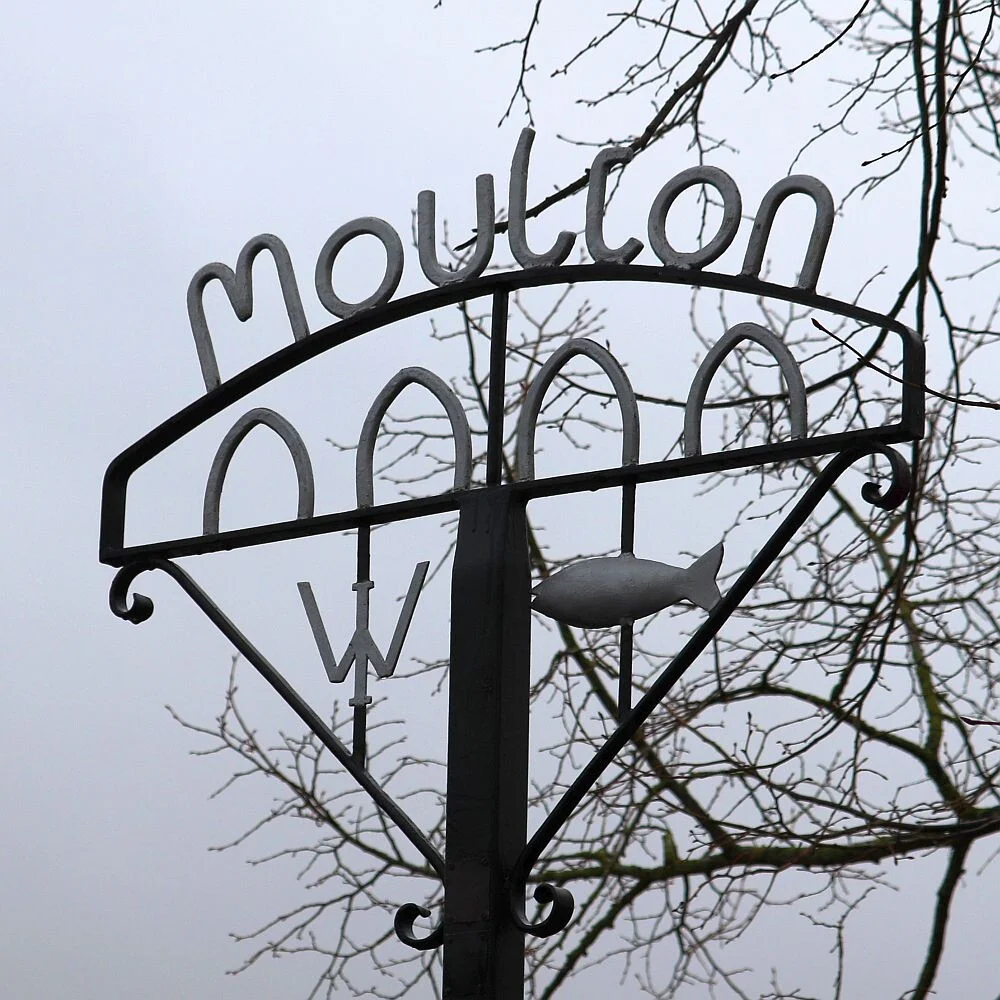
Moulton Village Sign

Moulton is a village and civil parish in the West Suffolk district of Suffolk in eastern England, located close to the town of Newmarket. It pre-dates the 1086 Domesday Book and, in 2005, it was estimated to have a population of 1090. 1,033 people were recorded at the 2011 census.

Moulton Packhorse Bridge

The village is older than the now larger town of Newmarket and includes a 15th-century packhorse bridge spanning the River Kennett. This is one of two such bridges in Suffolk, with the other being located in the neighbouring village Kentford. The bridge is a grade II* listed structure

Moulton also has a fine church, St. Peter's, with an early 14th-century tower topped by a gilded weather vane in the shape of a large pike by blacksmith Charles Poulter. Restored in 1851, it is a grade I listed building.

== John Gower connection ==
In August 1382 John Gower purchased the manors of Feltwell in Norfolk and Multon in Suffolk. They were then granted to Thomas Blakelake, parson of St. Nicholas, Feltwell, and others, at a rent of forty pounds annually for his life.

== Notable residents ==
=== People ===
- Mike Dillon
- William Cowie
- Samuel Moody; 1592-1658, politician and member of the First Suffolk Committee for Scandalous Ministers

=== Horses ===
- Alborada
- With Approval

=== Facilities ===
- Park
- Football pitch
- Playground
- Moulton Pavilion

=== Public House ===
- The Packhorse Inn
