= Kennet River =

Kennet River or Kennett River may refer to:

- Kennet River (New Zealand)
- Kennet River (Victoria), Australia
- Kennett River, Victoria, a settlement in Victoria, Australia

== See also ==
- River Kennet, Berkshire, England
- River Kennett, Suffolk, England
- Kennet (disambiguation)
