= Kennett High School =

Kennett High School may refer to a school in the United States:

- Kennett High School (New Hampshire), in Conway, New Hampshire
- Kennett High School (Pennsylvania), in Kennett Square, Pennsylvania
