= Fred Kennett =

Australian rules footballer (1908–1984)

Personal information
- Full name: Frederick James Kennett
- Born: 17 April 1908; Brunswick, Victoria
- Died: 24 August 1984 (aged 76); Strathmore, Victoria
- Original team: Brunswick
- Height: 168 cm (5 ft 6 in)
- Weight: 63 kg (139 lb)

Playing career^{1}
Years	Club	Games (Goals)
1928	South Melbourne	1 (0)
- ^{1} Playing statistics correct to the end of 1928.

Frederick James Kennett (17 April 1908 – 24 August 1984) was an Australian rules footballer who played with South Melbourne in the Victorian Football League (VFL).

== Family ==
The son of Frederick John Kennett (1880-1969), and Margaret Isabella Kennett (1885-1933), née McLellan, Frederick James Kennett was born at Brunswick, Victoria on 17 April 1908.

He married Mary Kathleen Dee (1907-1966) in 1931.

== Football ==
Kennett was granted a clearance from the Brunswick Football Club in the VFA to the South Melbourne Football Club in the VFL on 18 April 1928. He was granted a clearance from South Melbourne back to Brunswick on 23 May 1929. He was granted a clearance from Brunswick to the Fairfield Football Club, in the Sub-District Football League, on 13 June 1934.

== Death ==
He died (suddenly) at Strathmore, Victoria on 24 August 1984.
