= Mount Kennett =

Mountain in Graham Land, Antarctica

Mount Kennett (67°3′S 65°10′W) is a distinctive snow and rock mountain, 1,360 metres (4,460 ft) high, between Quartermain Glacier and Fricker Glacier on the east side of Graham Land. Features on this coast were photographed by several American expeditions: United States Antarctic Service, 1939–41; Ronne Antarctic Research Expedition, 1947–48; United States Navy photos, 1968. The mountain was mapped by the Falkland Islands Dependencies Survey, 1947–48, and named by the UK Antarctic Place-Names Committee for Peter Kennett, Geophysicist with the British Antarctic Survey Larsen Ice Shelf party, 1960–64.
