= Kennette Benedict =

American activist

Kennette Benedict is an American academic who is a University of Chicago lecturer and Senior Fellow in its Energy Policy Institute. From 2005–2015, she was Executive Director and Publisher of the Bulletin of the Atomic Scientists, where she also writes a monthly column. Before joining the Bulletin, she had been the Director of International Peace and Security at the John D. and Catherine T. MacArthur Foundation, where she also served as Senior Advisor to the President. She was responsible for grantmaking on issues of international peace and security including support for efforts to reduce the threat from weapons of mass destruction, and a $50 million initiative on science, technology, and security. While serving as Director of the International Peace and Security Area, she established and directed from 1992-2002 the Foundation's Initiative in the Former Soviet Union and in 2000 established a program of support for higher education in Nigeria. In her position as Senior Advisor, she worked with MacArthur's President to review and assess the role of private foundations in the United States and abroad.

Benedict taught at Rutgers University and the University of Illinois at Urbana-Champaign. Her research and teaching focused on organizational decisionmaking, jury decisionmaking, and on women's leadership and American politics. She has also published articles on global governance and on violent conflict. Prior to her academic career, she served in the Massachusetts State Planning agency on law enforcement and criminal justice.

Benedict serves on the Advisory Council of the Stanley Foundation and previously served on the boards Oberlin College and the Compton Foundation. She co-chaired the Peace and Security Funders Group from 2003–2005. She has served in a number of consulting and advisory capacities, including as advisor to the Rockefeller Brothers Fund, the University of Minnesota, and the Center for Effective Philanthropy. She is a member of the Council on Foreign Relations, the Chicago Council on Foreign Relations, and the International Institute of Strategic Studies. She received her A.B. from Oberlin College, and her Ph.D. in political science from Stanford University.
