= Todd P. Kennett =

Todd Kennett (born July 12, 1969, in Middlebury, Connecticut) is a coach of the Division I Collegiate heavyweight rowing program at Cornell University. In 2006 and 2008, his lightweight varsity boat program captured both the Eastern Sprints Regatta and the Intercollegiate Rowing Association Championships ("IRA").

== Early life ==
Todd Kennett was born in 1969 in Middlebury, Connecticut.

In 1987, at age 18, he entered as a freshman at Cornell University. A 1991 graduate of the Cornell University College of Agriculture and Life Sciences, Kennett received his bachelor of science degree in animal sciences. In his time at Cornell, Kennett was a member of the Heavyweight crew. He competed in the first freshman eight his first year and went on to row in the varsity eight for three consecutive seasons, including the 1991 campaign in which the varsity finished third at the IRA regatta and competed at the Henley Royal Regatta. He received the Butler Award for outstanding leadership and athletic performance as a senior. In his junior and senior years at Cornell, Kennett rowed in the U.S. Rowing Olympic Development and Pre-Elite camps. He also competed in the 1989 and 1990 Olympic Festivals, winning a bronze and gold, respectively.

== Coaching career ==
After Graduating from Cornell in June 1991, Kennett served as coach of the Ithaca College women's novice rowing program from 1992 to 1993. He led the squad to a 22–2 record, two New York State Small School titles and two Murphy Cups. His Bomber crews also earned silver and bronze medals at the Dad Vail Regatta.

In 1994, Kennett was hired by Cornell University as freshman lightweight crew coach. In his second year of coaching lightweights, Kennett led the freshman to a silver medal finish at the eastern sprints on June 17, 1995. His first freshman eight earned bronze at the 1998 Eastern Sprints, with the second freshman boat taking silver. Cornell's second freshman eight was undefeated during both the 1996 and 1997 regular seasons. Under Kennett, the four-with-coxswain heavyweights finished third at the IRA Championship Regatta in 1994.

Kennett was named the Robert B. Tallman Class of 1941 Men's Lightweight Rowing Head Coach in 1998. In 2001, all three of his crews made it to the grand final of the Eastern Sprints Regatta. In 2001, his varsity pair earned a silver medal at the IRA Championship Regatta. In 2004, 2005, and 2008 his pair won gold at the IRA Championship Regatta.

In 2005, Kennett's varsity boat won a bronze at the Eastern Sprints followed with a Silver at the IRA Regatta. Both his first and second varsity boats captured Gold at the 2006 Eastern Sprints regatta. His varsity followed up its Eastern Sprints victory with a narrow win over Harvard at the IRAs to win the National Championship. In 2007, Kennett again led the lightweights to a win at the IRA. In 2008, Kennett's varsity lightweight crew won the Eastern Sprints title, the Jope Cup for lightweight supremacy, and the IRA title for a record third straight year.

In 2005, 2006, 2007, and 2008 the varsity boat went to the Henley Royal Regatta and raced in the Temple Challenge Cup, placing second in 2006 and 2007 to Oxford Brookes University and the University of California-Berkeley freshmen.

In June 2007, Kennett was promoted to the "Spirit of '57 Director of Rowing/Head Coach of Heavyweight Rowing" at Cornell University.

In 2010, Kennett was named the 2009-10 Eastern Association of Rowing College's (EARC) Coach of the Year, as voted on by the leagues’ coaches.
