= D. Mark Kennet =

American economist

David Mark Kennet (born February 10, 1957, in Erie, Pennsylvania, United States) is an independent economic consultant. He has written a number of professional journal articles and has authored or co-authored two books.

== Career ==
Kennet was invited to speak to the Peruvian Congress in November 2008 on the issue of numerical portability, and was interviewed by the Peruvian daily Expreso, and the Mexican television station Televisa. He was also interviewed by Peruvian Channel 7 on the possibility of implementing free Internet in Peru.

== Selected publications ==
- "Did Airline Deregulation Affect Aircraft Engine Maintenance? An Empirical Policy Analysis", The RAND Journal of Economics, 1993.
- "A Structural Model of Aircraft Engine Maintenance", Journal of Applied Econometrics, 1994.
- "Economies of Scope in the Local Telephone Exchange Market" (with D. Gabel), Journal of Regulatory Economics, 1994.
- "The Effect of Cellular Service on the Cost Structure of a Land-Based Telephone Network" (with D. Gabel), Telecommunications Policy, 1997.
- "Fully Distributed Cost Pricing, Ramsey Pricing, and Shapley Value Pricing: A Simulated Welfare Analysis for the Telephone Exchange" (with D. Gabel), Review of Industrial Organization, 1997.
- "Innovations in Economic Measurement: Comments", Proceedings of the Joint Statistical Meetings of the American Statistical Association, Section on Government Statistics, 2000.
- "Measuring Productivity Change for Regulatory Purposes" (with N. Uri), Journal of Media Economics, 2001.
- "Computer Modeling of the Forward-Looking Economic Cost of Local Exchange Telephone Networks: An Optimization Approach2" (with W.W. Sharkey, J. Prisbrey, C. Bush, and V. Gupta), Telecommunication Systems, 2001.
- Cost Proxy Models and Telecommunications Policy: A New Empirical Approach to Regulation (with W. W. Sharkey, J.-J. Laffont, and F. Gasmi), MIT Press, 2002 (also in Chinese). ISBN 978-0-262-07237-3
- "Beyond the Rhetoric: An Introduction to TELRIC" (with R. Perez-Reyes), Review of Network Economics, 2002.
- "The Potential Role of Economic Cost Models in the Regulation of Telecommunications in Developing Countries" (with D. Benitez, A. Estache, and C. Ruzzier), Information Economics and Policy 14(1), 2002, pp. 21–38.
- "Efficient Interconnection Charges and Capacity-Based Pricing" (with E. Ralph), International Economics and Economic Policy, 2007.
- "Cargos de Interconexión Eficientes y Cargos por Capacidad en Telecomunicaciones", Revista de Regulación en Infraestructura de Transporte, 2008.
