= Graham Sims =

- Born: Graham Scott Sims; 25 June 1951 (age 75) Featherston, New Zealand
- Height: 1.76 m (5 ft 9 in)
- Weight: 80 kg (180 lb)
- School: Wanganui Boys' College
- University: University of Otago

Rugby union career
- Position: Centre
Provincial / State sides
Years	Team	Apps	(Points)
1971–73	Otago	28	
1974–75	Canterbury	12	
International career
Years	Team	Apps	(Points)
1972	New Zealand	1	(0)

Graham Scott Sims (born 25 June 1951) is a former New Zealand rugby union player. A centre, Sims represented Otago and Canterbury at a provincial level. He was a member of the New Zealand national side, the All Blacks, in 1972, playing a single test match against the touring Australian team.

He later served as New Zealand's trade commissioner and consul-general to Vietnam, based in Ho Chi Minh City.
