= Paul Kennett =

Wales international rugby league footballer

Personal information
- Full name: Paul Kennett
- Born: 7 January 1971 (age 54); Wales

Playing information
Club
Years	Team	Pld	T	G	FG	P
1991–94	Swinton	71	13	0	0	52
Representative
Years	Team	Pld	T	G	FG	P
1992	Wales	1	0	0	0	0

Paul Kennett is a former professional rugby league footballer who played in the 1990s. He played at representative level for Wales, and at club level for Swinton.

== Playing career ==
=== Club career ===
Kennett was signed by Swinton from Welsh rugby union club Tondu RFC. He made his first team debut in 1991.

=== International honours ===
Kennett won one cap for Wales as a substitute in 1992 while at Swinton.
