= HM Prison Kennet =

Former prison in Merseyside, England

Coordinates: 53.519°N 2.914°W

HMP Kennet
- Interactive map of HMP Kennet
- Location: Maghull, Liverpool, Merseyside
- Security class: Adult Male/Category C
- Population: 342 (December 2007)
- Opened: 2007
- Closed: 2016
- Managed by: HM Prison Services
- Governor: Derek Harrison
- Website: Kennet at justice.gov.uk

HM Prison Kennet was a Category C men's prison, located in Parkbourn, Maghull, in the Metropolitan Borough of Sefton in Merseyside, England. The prison was operated by Her Majesty's Prison Service. The prison closed on 23 December 2016

== History ==
Faced with overcrowding in regional prisons, the National Offender Management Service in December 2006 planned a new facility on the East Site of Ashworth Hospital, which it leases from Mersey Care NHS Foundation Trust. The site of the new prison and surrounding area were known locally as Kennet Heath, so the name Kennet was adopted for the prison.

The prison was converted from the existing medical buildings at a cost of £19 million. It began accepting inmates in September 2007, but was officially opened in February 2008.

In April 2010, The Howard League for Penal Reform rated Kennet as the most overcrowded prison in England and Wales. The prison was found to be running at 193% capacity.

In May 2016 it was announced that the National Offender Management Service will close Kennet Prison by July 2017, less than 10 years after it opened. Reasons for closure include high operation costs and difficulties with the design and operation of the prison. After closure the site was returned to Mersey Care NHS Foundation Trust. In June 2023 it was announced that the former prison buildings would be demolished.

== The prison before closure ==
Kennet Prison held Category C adult males from the surrounding area. Accommodation at the prison was divided between seven units, predominantly containing double occupancy cells with integral sanitation, showers on all landings, purpose built serveries, and association facilities. There was also an additional segregation unit.

The prison offered workshops, training and education to all prisoners. Workshops included Bricklaying, Plastering, Construction and Joinery, as well as Painting and Decorating. Education courses included Information Technology, Business Studies, Art and Design, Catering and Media Studies.

There was a visitors centre at Kennet Prison, with facilities including a children's play area and refreshments. There was access for disabled visitors throughout the visitors area.
