= Brady Kennett =

New Zealand racing driver

Brady Olliver Kennett (born 12 February 1974) is a racing car driver from New Zealand. He has raced Formula Ford, Formula Holden, V8 Touring Cars, V8 Utes, Super Trucks and Production Cars.

Kennett had a couple of early notable wins before breaking his legs in a Formula Ford crash in the Wellington Street Race in 1993. After recovering from his injuries he returned to racing and won the biggest event of his career so far, the 1995 New Zealand Grand Prix.

From 1997 to 2002, Kennett raced in the New Zealand Formula Ford Championship, Winning the Formula Ford Festival in 2000, Runner Up in the New Zealand Formula Ford Championship in 1998 and 2001–02 and finishing third in the same championship in 1997, 1998–99 and 1999–2000. In 1999 and 2000 he won the Dan Higgins Formula Ford Trophy and was second in 2001.

In 2001-02, Kennett finished tenth in the Caltex Delo 400 Super Truck Championship, before commencing his V8 career. He finished 21st in the New Zealand Championship in 2001–02, and second at Taupo. The following season (2002–03) he finished seventh in his AU Falcon, again with another podium, this time a second at Manfeild. The 2003–04 season he finished 12th but was on the podium four times. He had seconds at Manfeild and Taupo and third places at Timaru and Taupo. He also finished 12th in the 2004 Placemakers V8 Supercar Event.

In the 2004–05 season, Kennett managed 19th in the New Zealand V8 Touring Car Championship. A third at Taupo was his only top-five finish for the year. At the end of the season, he sold his BA Falcon to Ian Tulloch.

In 2006, Kennett co-drove a BA Falcon Ute with Australian James Harrigan at the Manfeild V8 Ute International. He finished seventh in Race 1 and 14th in the feature race with James.

Kennett returned to car racing in 2007–08 with a Mitsubishi Lancer Evo in the Suzuki New Zealand Production Racing Championship. His six starts in the series (all at Manfeild) netted two seconds, a third and three fourths.

Kennett competed in the 2008-09 Production championship in the same Lancer evo IV. He won three of seven rounds of the championship. Winning five races during the season and securing five pole positions from qualifying. He won the national championship narrowly by six points to Zane Coppins.

Kennett's father Bob, also a driver, raced a Porsche 911 and a Ford Mustang in a few Trans-Am Races in the United States in 1969–70, 1970–71, and 1971–72.

Sporting positions
Preceded by Greg Murphy	Winner of the New Zealand Grand Prix; 1995	Succeeded by Simon Wills
