= Bob Kennett =

New Zealand racecar driver

Robert John Kennett is a New Zealand racecar driver who raced strictly in the United States. He is the father of New Zealand race car driver Brady Kennett.

In 1969, Kennett raced in the US Trans-Am Series in a Porsche 911. He finished 14th at the Kent 300 in Seattle (third in class) and ninth in the ARRC Daytona. In 1970 he again raced in the Trans-Am Series, but this time in a Ford Mustang. He had a DNF in Round 1 at Laguna Seca Raceway and was 16th in Round 10 at the Kent 200 in Seattle. He did, however, have some wins in the US West Coast National Championship.
