= Greg Murphy =

New Zealand racing driver

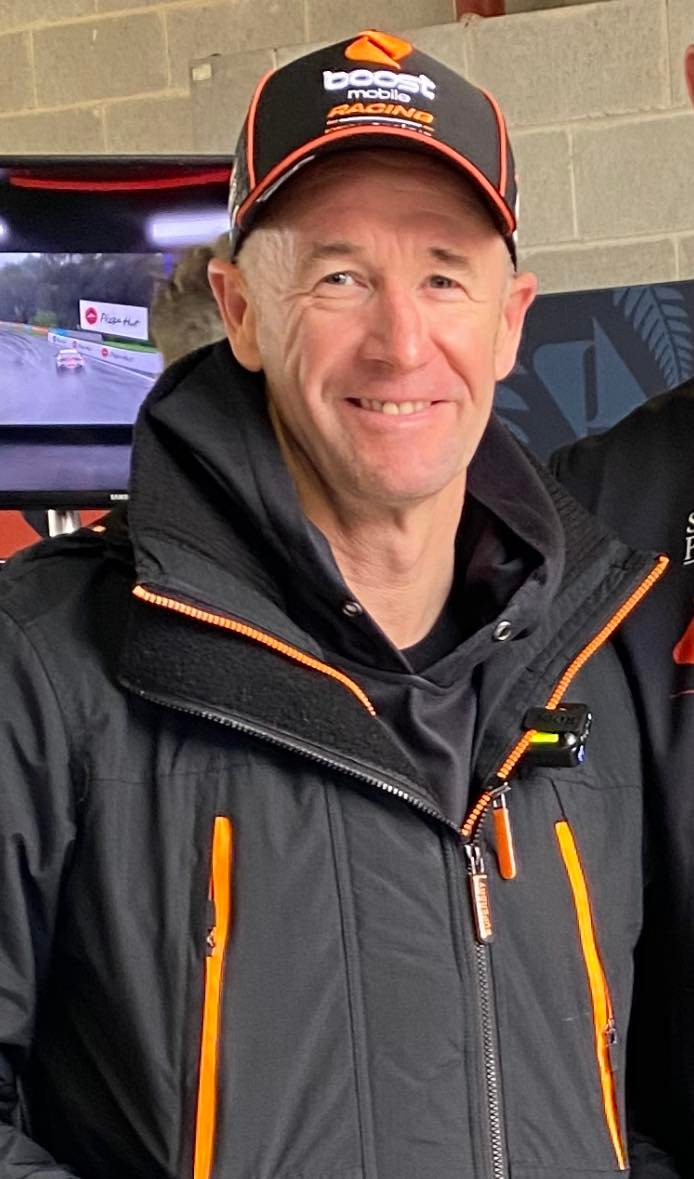
- Greg Murphy during the 2022 Bathurst 1000
- Nationality: New Zealander
- Born: Gregory David Murphy; 23 August 1972 (age 54) Hastings, New Zealand

V8SuperTourer
- Years active: 2012-14
- Teams: M3 Racing
- Car number: 1
- Starts: 157
- Wins: 22
- Poles: 4
- Fastest laps: 11
- Best finish: 1st in 2013 & 2014

Supercars Championship career
- Current team: Erebus Motorsport
- Championships: 0
- Races: 448
- Wins: 28
- Podiums: 81
- Pole positions: 13

Gregory David Murphy (born 23 August 1972) is a New Zealand professional racing driver, best known as a four-time winner of the Bathurst 1000. Greg Murphy joined Jeremy Clarkson and James May presenting Top Gear Live, when it had its first international Live show at ASB Showgrounds in Auckland from 12 to 15 February 2009, and again when the show returned in 2010.

== History ==
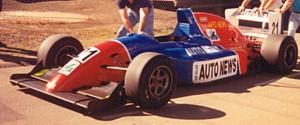
1994 Ralt Formula Brabham

Murphy became involved in motorsports by the age of eight, progressing through karts to saloon cars and single-seaters before moving to Australia.

Murphy first competed at the Bathurst circuit in 1994. The following two years, he drove for Brad Jones Racing in the Australian Super Touring Championship and the Holden Racing Team (HRT) in endurance events, winning the Bathurst 1000 with Craig Lowndes in 1996. He drove for the HRT full-time in the 1997 Australian Touring Car Championship and placed fourth. Due to Lowndes' return from overseas, Murphy only drove for the team in the endurance races in 1998.

In 1999 and 2000, Murphy finished sixth in points driving for Gibson Motorsport. He paired with Steven Richards to win the Bathurst 1000. In the 2001 V8 Supercar season, Murphy joined the newly formed K-Mart Racing team and had two Bathurst 1000 wins with teammate Rick Kelly, in 2003 and 2004. Murphy had two championship runners-up while at K-Mart Racing, in 2002 and 2003. In 2001 and 2004, he finished fourth in the championship.

Murphy is one of the best known V8 Supercar drivers (car No. 51 since 2001) and has won four rounds at his home circuit at Pukekohe, near Auckland (2001, 2002, 2003 and 2005). At the Mount Panorama Circuit at Bathurst, Murphy has the third best record for a Kiwi with four wins, compared to Jim Richards' seven, and his son Steven Richards' five.

Murphy's 2003 pole position of 2:06.8594 at Bathurst stood as the fastest lap ever recorded at Mount Panorama Circuit until eclipsed seven years later. It is known colloquially as "The Lap of the Gods" and widely regarded as one of the finest moments in Bathurst folklore.

In November of 2003, Murphy won the Bathurst 24 Hour race in the Garry Rogers Motorsport built, 7.0 litre V8 Holden Monaro 427C alongside Peter Brock, Jason Bright and Todd Kelly. Murphy qualified the #05 Monaro in second place behind the 2002 race winning Monaro of teammate Garth Tander. The two Monaro's led the race throughout with Murphy in the car finishing only 0.3505 in front of Tander after 527 laps of racing.

During 2005 and 2006, Murphy competed for Paul Weel Racing (PWR) where he initially had good results until changing to the Perkins engines. Since then Murphy has never really had any outstanding performances. Murphy joined Tasman Motorsport in 2007 where his lack of results continued.

Murphy joined Paul Morris Motorsport in 2010 to drive Castrol supported Commodore. While the partnership looked like it was to reignite the "old murph" his performances and a poor car failed to produce results thus the announcement came in November 2010 that the partnership would split.

Murphy joined Kelly Racing for 2011 in a late deal with major sponsor Pepsi Max. Throughout the year the Pepsi Max Crew car has undergone four different paint schemes all with a graffiti theme. Murphy has had varying success throughout the year and as he has become more comfortable with his car and the team he has had some good performances, including pole position at the Bathurst 1000.

2013 saw Murphy return to Holden Racing Team on a part-time basis, co-driving with Car #22 driver James Courtney in the endurance events. However, Bathurst saw Murphy involved in a heavy crash at Reid Park, therefore ending his chances of finishing the race. The bad luck didn't end there, with yet another serious incident bringing Car #22 down (this time involving Paul Dumbrell from Triple Eight Race Engineering) in Race 1 at Gold Coast.

In 2021 Peter Adderton from Boost Mobile floated the idea of running a Wildcard entry for Murphy and fellow retired Kiwi racer Richie Stanaway in the upcoming Bathurst 1000. The idea gained massive fan support, helping to convince Murphy and Stanaway to return for the first time since 2014 & 2019 respectively. On 8 June 2021 it was confirmed that the two would return in an Erebus Motorsport run Boost Mobile supported entry. On 12 November 2021 the wildcard was postponed due to travel restrictions between Australia & New Zealand. In late April 2022 Erebus Motorsport confirmed that the Wildcard would be revived for the upcoming Bathurst 1000. There were plans to run Murphy & Stanaway in solo events prior to Bathurst but those plans fell through, the two will get three test days prior to the 1000 with the first set to be run at Winton Motor Raceway on 7 June.

== Notable career events ==
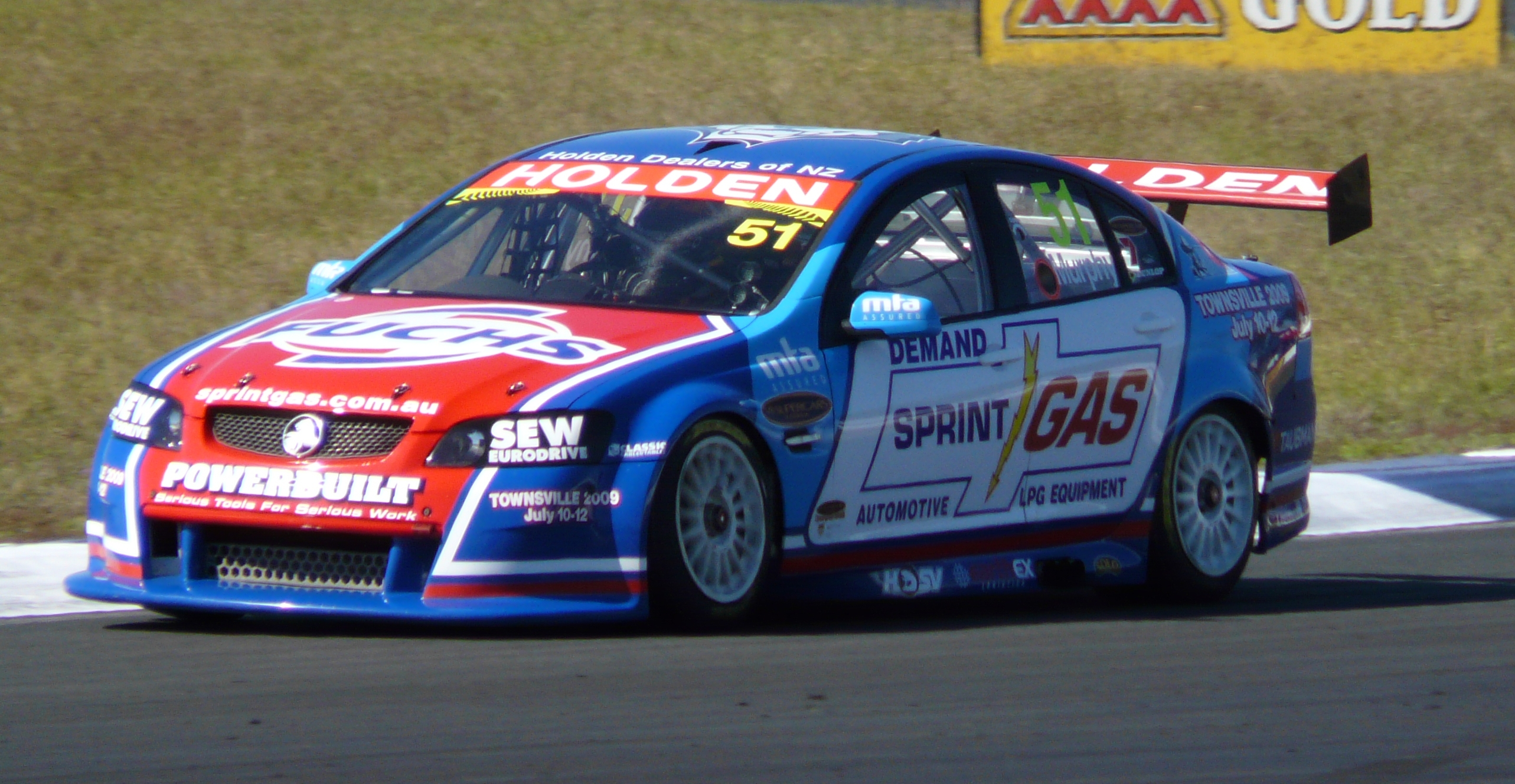
2008 Holden VE Commodore V8 Supercar

- 1994 – Won the New Zealand Grand Prix at Manfeild driving a Reynard 90D
- 1996 – Second in the GT2 Class at Le Mans
- 1996 – Won Bathurst 1000 and Sandown 500 with Craig Lowndes and the Holden Racing Team
- 1999 – Won the Bathurst 1000 with Steven Richards
- 2000 – Third at Bathurst with Steven Richards
- 2001 – Helped to create Kmart Racing after Gibson Motorsport turned to Ford and Craig Lowndes. Finished third at Bathurst with Todd Kelly
- 2002 – Was given the biggest penalty (five minutes) in V8 racing history because of a pitlane infringement by his team. His car was released early, rupturing a refuelling hose and spilling fuel in the pit box
- 2003 – Set the fastest lap ever on the 6.213 km (later eclipsed in 2010 by Craig Lowndes and then again in 2017 by Scott McLaughlin) Mount Panorama Circuit during the Top 10 Shootout, with a time of 2:06.8594 dubbed 'The Lap of Gods'. Won Bathurst 1000 with Rick Kelly. Won Bathurst 24 Hour with Peter Brock, Todd Kelly and Jason Bright
- 2004 – Won Bathurst 1000 again with Rick Kelly
- 2008 – Finished second at Bathurst 1000
- 2011 – Got pole position for the second time at Bathurst and finished 3rd in the 2011 Bathurst 1000
- 2012 – Won the first ever V8SuperTourer race at Hampton Downs, then eventually finished Runner-up for the Season.
- 2013 – Greg Murphy Won the V8SuperTourer Sprint Series and Overall Championship, his first Championship Win in 17 years.
- 2014 – Murphy Won the V8SuperTourer Sprint Series and Overall Championship for the second year in a row. Greg also finished second in the Sandown 500 with James Courtney.
- 2016 – Murphy returned to circuit racing for the first time since the Gold Coast 600 in 2014. He joined Tony Quinn in an Aston Martin for the Highlands 101 race where they finished second place.

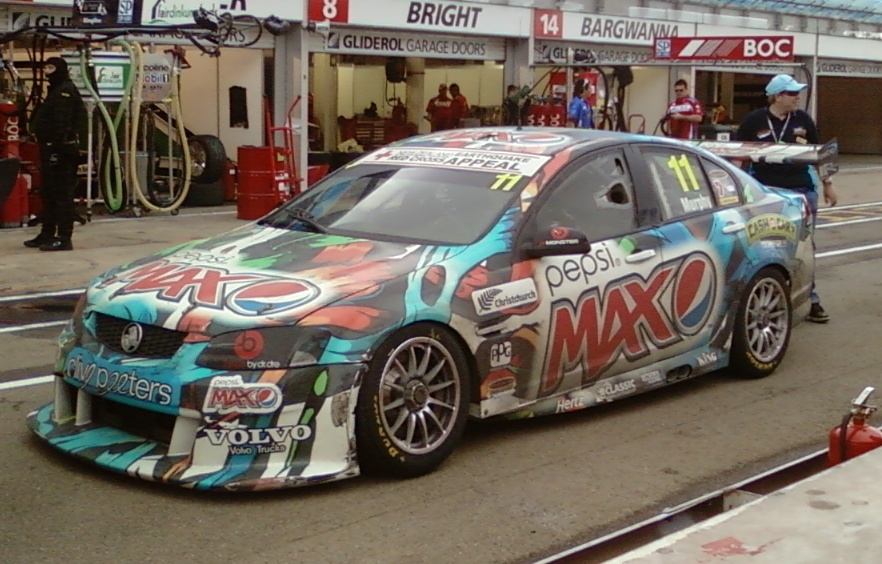
The Holden VE Commodore of Greg Murphy at the 2011 Clipsal 500 Adelaide

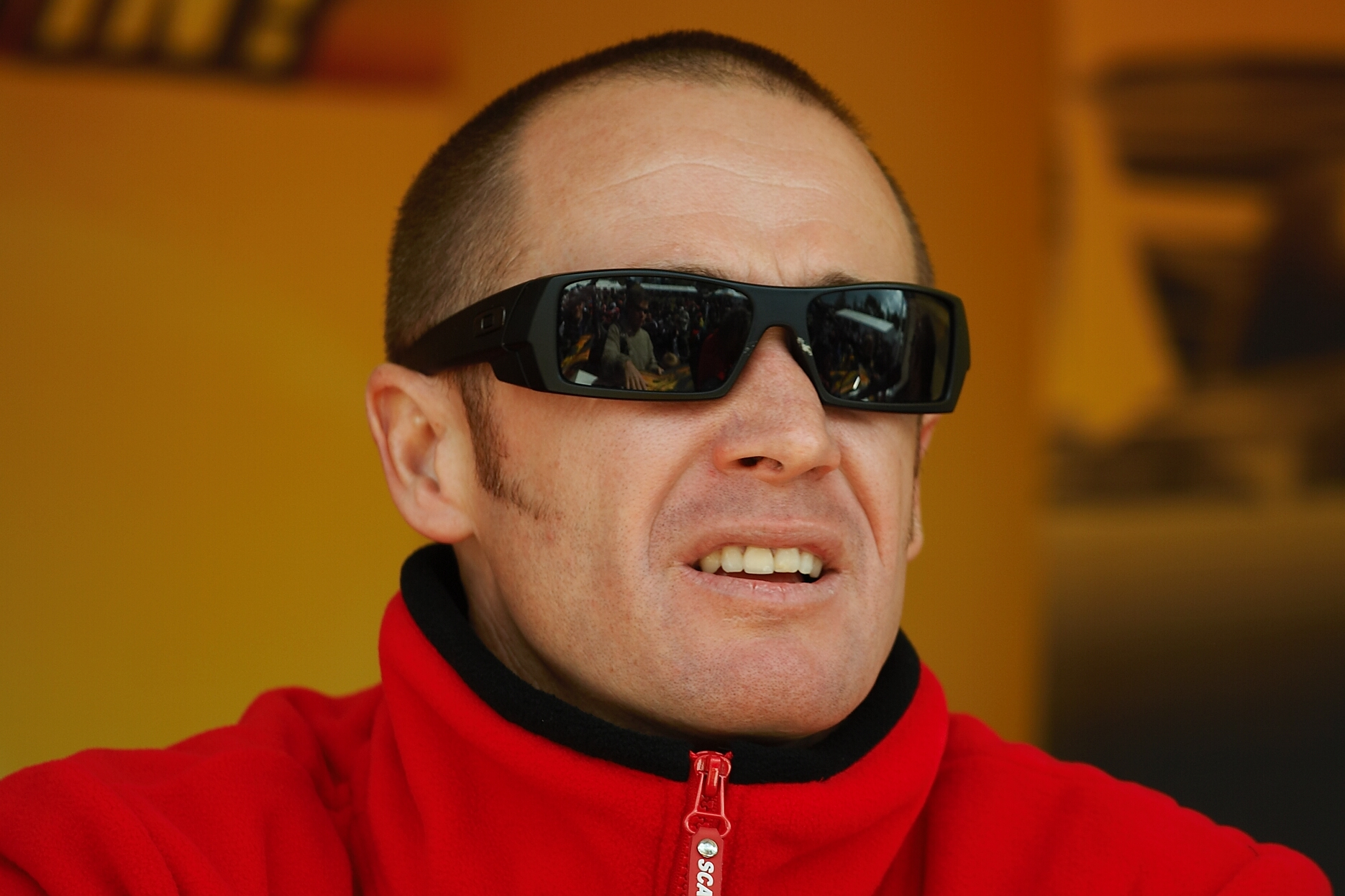
Greg Murphy at the 2006 Australian Grand Prix

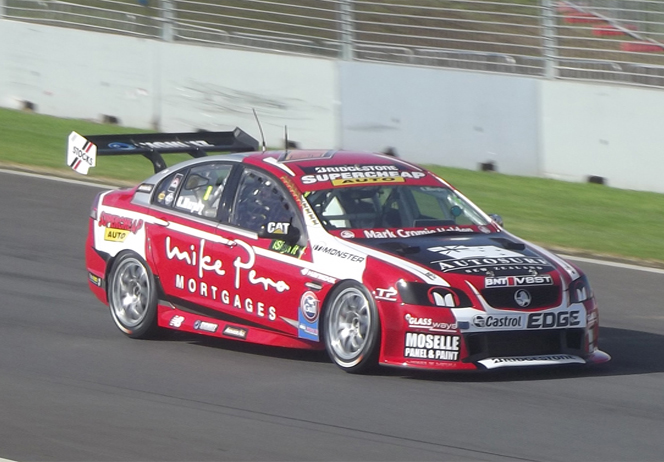
Greg Murphy at the 2014 ITM Auckland 500

=== Personal life ===
Greg was born and raised in New Zealand, where he attended Havelock North High School. After being based in Melbourne, Victoria for most of his racing career he now lives in New Zealand with frequent trips to Australia.

== Career results ==
=== Career highlights ===
Season	Series	Position	Car	Team
1992	Nissan-Mobil Series	**3rd**	Ford Sierra RS500	Mark Petch Motorsport
1993/94	New Zealand Gold Star – Single Seaters	**1st**	Formula Brabham	
1994	Australian Drivers' Championship	**2nd**	Ralt RT23 Holden	Triple Eight Racing
1994	Australian Manufacturers' Championship	8th	Toyota Carina	Orix Racing
1994/95	New Zealand Gold Star – Single Seaters	**1st**	Formula Brabham	
1995	Australian Super Touring Championship	4th	Audi 80 Quattro	Brad Jones Racing
1996	Australian Super Touring Championship	**3rd**	Audi A4 Quattro	Brad Jones Racing
1996	New Zealand Mobil Sprints	**1st**	Holden VR Commodore	Holden Racing Team
1997	Australian Touring Car Championship	4th	Holden VS Commodore	Holden Racing Team
1998	Australian Touring Car Championship	30th	Holden VT Commodore	Holden Racing Team
1999	Shell Championship Series	6th	Holden VT Commodore	Gibson Motorsport
2000	Shell Championship Series	6th	Holden VT Commodore	Gibson Motorsport
2000	American Le Mans Series	36th	Panoz LMP-1 Roadster-S	Panoz Motor Sports
2001	Shell Championship Series	4th	Holden VX Commodore	K-mart Racing Team
2002	V8 Supercar Championship Series	**2nd**	Holden VX Commodore	K-mart Racing Team
2003	V8 Supercar Championship Series	**2nd**	Holden VX Commodore; Holden VY Commodore	K-mart Racing Team
2004	V8 Supercar Championship Series	4th	Holden VY Commodore	K-mart Racing Team
2005	V8 Supercar Championship Series	11th	Holden VZ Commodore	Paul Weel Racing
2006	V8 Supercar Championship Series	24th	Holden VZ Commodore	Paul Weel Racing
2007	V8 Supercar Championship Series	13th	Holden VE Commodore	Tasman Motorsport
2008	V8 Supercar Championship Series	16th	Holden VE Commodore	Tasman Motorsport
2009	V8 Supercar Championship Series	21st	Holden VE Commodore	Tasman Motorsport
2010	V8 Supercar Championship Series	19th	Holden VE Commodore	Paul Morris Motorsport
2011	International V8 Supercars Championship	13th	Holden VE Commodore	Kelly Racing
2012	International V8 Supercars Championship	28th	Holden VE Commodore	Kelly Racing
2012	V8SuperTourer Championship	**2nd**	Holden VE Commodore	M3 Racing
2013	International V8 Supercars Championship	52nd	Holden VF Commodore	Holden Racing Team
2013	Australian GT Championship	20th	Chevrolet Corvette Z06 R-GT3; McLaren MP4-12C GT3	Trofeo Motorsport; VIP Petfoods Racing
2013	V8SuperTourer Championship	**1st**	Holden VE Commodore	M3 Racing
2014	V8SuperTourer Championship	**1st**	Holden VE Commodore	M3 Racing
2014	International V8 Supercars Championship	35th	Holden VF Commodore	Holden Racing Team
2014-15	V8SuperTourer Championship	11th	Holden VE Commodore	M3 Racing
2016	Australian GT Championship	24th	Aston Martin Vantage GT3	Darrell Lea
2021	Toyota Racing Series	15th	Tatuus FT-60	Kiwi Motorsport
2021	TCR New Zealand Touring Car Championship	6th	Audi RS 3 LMS TCR	TrackTec Racing
2021	North Island Endurance Series	11th	Audi TT VLN	Golden Homes
2022	Repco Supercars Championship		Holden ZB Commodore	Erebus Motorsport
2022	North Island Endurance Series - 1 Hour	4th	Renault Sport R.S. 01	Golden Homes
2022	North Island Endurance Series - 3 Hour	7th	Renault Sport R.S. 01	Golden Homes

=== Complete V8 Supercar results ===
V8 Supercars results
Year	Team	No.	Car	1	2	3	4	5	6	7	8	9	10	11	12	13	14	15	16	17	18	19	20	21	22	23	24	25	26	27	28	29	30	31	32	33	34	35	36	37	38	Position	Points
1997	Holden Racing Team	15	Holden VS Commodore	CAL; R1; 1	CAL; R2; 7	CAL; R3; 7	PHI; R4; 3	PHI; R5; 4	PHI; R6; DNS	SAN; R7; DNS	SAN; R8; 11	SAN; R9; 3	SYM; R10; 2	SYM; R11; 1	SYM; R12; 1	WIN; R13; 6	WIN; R14; Ret	WIN; R15; 6	EAS; R16; DNS	EAS; R17; 7	EAS; R18; Ret	LAK; R19; 6	LAK; R20; 3	LAK; R21; Ret	BAR; R22; 7	BAR; R23; 3	BAR; R24; 1	MAL; R25; 1	MAL; R26; 1	MAL; R27; 2	ORA; R28; 2	ORA; R29; 3	ORA; R30; 2									4th	550
1998	Holden Racing Team	98	Holden VT Commodore	EAS; R1	EAS; R2	EAS; R3	SYM; R4	SYM; R5	SYM; R6	LAK; R7	LAK; R8	LAK; R9	PHI; R10	PHI; R11	PHI; R12	WIN; R13	WIN; R14	WIN; R15	MAL; R16	MAL; R17	MAL; R18	BAR; R19	BAR; R20	BAR; R21	CAL; R22; 9	CAL; R23; 12	HID; R24	HID; R25	HID; R26	ORA; R27	ORA; R28	ORA; R29										30th	38
1999	Gibson Motorsport	12	Holden VT Commodore	EAS; R1; 13	EAS; R2; 9	EAS; R3; 6	ADE; R4; 2	BAR; R5; Ret	BAR; R6; Ret	BAR; R7; 13	PHI; R8; 13	PHI; R9; 24	PHI; R10; 14	HID; R11; 15	HID; R12; 10	HID; R13; 19	SAN; R14; 13	SAN; R15; 7	SAN; R16; 10	QLD; R17; 9	QLD; R18; 11	QLD; R19; 12	CAL; R20; 20	CAL; R21; 11	CAL; R22; 12	SYM; R23; 1	SYM; R24; 10	SYM; R25; 7	WIN; R26; 24	WIN; R27; 17	WIN; R28; 12	ORA; R29; Ret	ORA; R30; 17	ORA; R31; 21	QLD; R32; 6	BAT; R33; 1						6th	1428
2000	Gibson Motorsport	12	Holden VT Commodore	PHI; R1; Ret	PHI; R2; 27	BAR; R3; 12	BAR; R4; 11	BAR; R5; 7	ADE; R6; 8	ADE; R7; 5	EAS; R8; 20	EAS; R9; 11	EAS; R10; 7	HID; R11; 8	HID; R12; 7	HID; R13; 7	CAN; R14; 1	CAN; R15; 12	CAN; R16; 22	QLD; R17; 11	QLD; R18; 9	QLD; R19; 7	WIN; R20; 5	WIN; R21; 4	WIN; R22; 14	ORA; R23; 5	ORA; R24; 2	ORA; R25; 5	CAL; R26; 9	CAL; R27; 9	CAL; R28; 9	QLD; R29; 3	SAN; R30; 19	SAN; R31; 20	SAN; R32; 15	BAT; R33; 3						6th	1108
2001	K-mart Racing Team	51	Holden VX Commodore	PHI; R1; 5	PHI; R2; 3	ADE; R3; Ret	ADE; R4; 10	EAS; R5; 1	EAS; R6; 11	HID; R7; 4	HID; R8; 1	HID; R9; 12	CAN; R10; 12	CAN; R11; Ret	CAN; R12; Ret	BAR; R13; 5	BAR; R14; 4	BAR; R15; 3	CAL; R16; 17	CAL; R17; 14	CAL; R18; 8	ORA; R19; Ret	ORA; R20; 11	QLD; R21; 3	WIN; R22; 1	WIN; R23; 6	BAT; R24; 3	PUK; R25; 1	PUK; R26; 1	PUK; R27; 1	SAN; R28; 8	SAN; R29; 2	SAN; R30; Ret									4th	2724
2002	K-mart Racing Team	51	Holden VX Commodore	ADE; R1; 2	ADE; R2; 2	PHI; R3; DSQ	PHI; R4; 17	EAS; R5; 4	EAS; R6; 7	EAS; R7; 5	HID; R8; 4	HID; R9; 4	HID; R10; 3	CAN; R11; Ret	CAN; R12; Ret	CAN; R13; 4	BAR; R14; 3	BAR; R15; 1	BAR; R16; 3	ORA; R17; Ret	ORA; R18; 23	WIN; R19; 5	WIN; R20; 3	QLD; R21; 10	BAT; R22; 13	SUR; R23; 1	SUR; R24; 18	PUK; R25; 2	PUK; R26; 1	PUK; R27; 4	SAN; R28; 2	SAN; R29; 3										2nd	1569
2003	K-mart Racing Team	51	Holden VX Commodore	ADE; R1; 10	ADE; R2; 11	PHI; R3; 3	EAS; R4; 5	WIN; R5; 14	BAR; R6; 1	BAR; R7; 4	BAR; R8; 3	HID; R9; 6	HID; R10; 5	HID; R11; 2	QLD; R12; 8																											2nd	1983
2003	K-mart Racing Team	51	Holden VY Commodore													ORA; R13; 11	SAN; R14; 3	BAT; R15; 1	SUR; R16; 2	SUR; R17; 2	PUK; R18; 1	PUK; R19; 1	PUK; R20; 3	EAS; R21; 23	EAS; R22; Ret																	2nd	1983
2004	K-mart Racing Team	51	Holden VY Commodore	ADE; R1; 4	ADE; R2; 9	EAS; R3; 5	PUK; R4; 4	PUK; R5; 2	PUK; R6; 2	HID; R7; 13	HID; R8; 4	HID; R9; 4	BAR; R10; 7	BAR; R11; 3	BAR; R12; 16	QLD; R13; Ret	WIN; R14; 5	ORA; R15; 11	ORA; R16; 12	SAN; R17; 5	BAT; R18; 1	SUR; R19; 2	SUR; R20; 1	SYM; R21; 11	SYM; R22; 4	SYM; R23; 4	EAS; R24; 13	EAS; R25; 24	EAS; R26; 18													4th	1913
2005	Paul Weel Racing	51	Holden VZ Commodore	ADE; R1; 6	ADE; R2; Ret	PUK; R3; 1	PUK; R4; 1	PUK; R5; 1	BAR; R6; 5	BAR; R7; 30	BAR; R8; Ret	EAS; R9; 4	EAS; R10; 3	SHA; R11; 10	SHA; R12; Ret	SHA; R13; 7	HID; R14; 13	HID; R15; 16	HID; R16; Ret	QLD; R17; 8	ORA; R18; 3	ORA; R19; 3	SAN; R20; Ret	BAT; R21; Ret	SUR; R22; 1	SUR; R23; 2	SUR; R24; 3	SYM; R25; 20	SYM; R26; 5	SYM; R27; 5	PHI; R28; 6	PHI; R29; 7	PHI; R30; 2									11th	1500
2006	Paul Weel Racing	51	Holden VZ Commodore	ADE; R1; 5	ADE; R2; Ret	PUK; R3; Ret	PUK; R4; 15	PUK; R5; 15	BAR; R6; 14	BAR; R7; 3	BAR; R8; 19	WIN; R9; 9	WIN; R10; Ret	WIN; R11; Ret	HID; R12; 26	HID; R13; 9	HID; R14; 12	QLD; R15; 11	QLD; R16; 17	QLD; R17; 10	ORA; R18; 13	ORA; R19; Ret	ORA; R20; 10	SAN; R21; 29	BAT; R22; Ret	SUR; R23; 19	SUR; R24; 20	SUR; R25; 12	SYM; R26; Ret	SYM; R27; DNS	SYM; R28; DNS	BHR; R29; 12	BHR; R30; 7	BHR; R31; 12	PHI; R32; 12	PHI; R33; 17	PHI; R34; 9					24th	1710
2007	Tasman Motorsport	51	Holden VE Commodore	ADE; R1; 7	ADE; R2; Ret	BAR; R3; 8	BAR; R4; 7	BAR; R5; 12	PUK; R6; 12	PUK; R7; 11	PUK; R8; 13	WIN; R9; Ret	WIN; R10; 4	WIN; R11; 7	EAS; R12; 12	EAS; R13; 25	EAS; R14; 11	HID; R15; Ret	HID; R16; Ret	HID; R17; 14	QLD; R18; 19	QLD; R19; 12	QLD; R20; 7	ORA; R21; 9	ORA; R22; Ret	ORA; R23; 22	SAN; R24; 14	BAT; R25; 4	SUR; R26; 5	SUR; R27; 4	SUR; R28; 13	BHR; R29; 10	BHR; R30; 11	BHR; R31; 10	SYM; R32; 11	SYM; R33; 22	SYM; R34; 15	PHI; R35; 10	PHI; R36; 13	PHI; R37; 22		13th	250
2008	Tasman Motorsport	51	Holden VE Commodore	ADE; R1; 10	ADE; R2; 7	EAS; R3; 9	EAS; R4; 11	EAS; R5; 10	HAM; R6; 23	HAM; R7; 25	HAM; R8; Ret	BAR; R9; 12	BAR; R10; 21	BAR; R11; 15	SAN; R12; 22	SAN; R13; 26	SAN; R14; 11	HID; R15; 18	HID; R16; 22	HID; R17; 10	QLD; R18; 24	QLD; R19; 20	QLD; R20; 19	WIN; R21; 27	WIN; R22; 21	WIN; R23; 21	PHI; R24; Ret	BAT; R25; 2	SUR; R26; Ret	SUR; R27; 14	SUR; R28; 12	BHR; R29; 10	BHR; R30; 19	BHR; R31; 18	SYM; R32; 16	SYM; R33; 12	SYM; R34; 14	ORA; R35; 21	ORA; R36; 17	ORA; R37; Ret		16th	1572
2009	Tasman Motorsport	51	Holden VE Commodore	ADE; R1; Ret	ADE; R2; 8	HAM; R3; Ret	HAM; R4; 8	WIN; R5; 22	WIN; R6; 20	SYM; R7; 9	SYM; R8; 22	HID; R9; 23	HID; R10; 21	TOW; R11; 19	TOW; R12; Ret	SAN; R13; 11	SAN; R14; 23	QLD; R15; 17	QLD; R16; Ret	PHI; R17; 11	BAT; R18; 4	SUR; R19; 6	SUR; R20; 5	PHI; R21; 15	PHI; R22; 26	BAR; R23; 8	BAR; R24; 19	SYD; R25; Ret	SYD; R26; 7													21st	1555
2010	Paul Morris Motorsport	51	Holden VE Commodore	YMC; R1	YMC; R2	BHR; R3; 16	BHR; R4; 22	ADE; R5; Ret	ADE; R6; Ret	HAM; R7; 18	HAM; R8; 15	QLD; R9; 23	QLD; R10; Ret	WIN; R11; 13	WIN; R12; 15	HID; R13; 16	HID; R14; 18	TOW; R15; 23	TOW; R16; 17	PHI; R17; 13	BAT; R18; 6	SUR; R19; 13	SUR; R20; 15	SYM; R21; 3	SYM; R22; 5	SAN; R23; 23	SAN; R24; 10	SYD; R25; Ret	SYD; R26; 12													19th	1432
2011	Kelly Racing	11	Holden VE Commodore	YMC; R1; 21	YMC; R2; 9	ADE; R3; 18	ADE; R4; 19	HAM; R5; 8	HAM; R6; Ret	BAR; R7; 15	BAR; R8; 24	BAR; R9; 10	WIN; R10; 18	WIN; R11; 11	HID; R12; 12	HID; R13; 22	TOW; R14; 19	TOW; R15; 20	QLD; R16; 6	QLD; R17; 7	QLD; R18; 13	PHI; Q 3	PHI; R19; 11	BAT; R20; 3	SUR; R21; 6	SUR; R22; 4	SYM; R23; Ret	SYM; R24; 14	SAN; R25; Ret	SAN; R26; 21	SYD; R27; 16	SYD; R28; 11										13th	1750
2012	Kelly Racing	51	Holden VE Commodore	ADE; R1; 24	ADE; R2; DNS	SYM; R3	SYM; R4	HAM; R5; DNF	HAM; R6; 17	BAR; R7; 12	BAR; R8; 16	BAR; R9; 11	PHI; R10; 24	PHI; R11; 14	HID; R12	HID; R13	TOW; R14	TOW; R15	QLD; R16	QLD; R17	SMP; R18	SMP; R19	SAN; Q 26	SAN; R20; 27	BAT; R21; 13	SUR; R22; 13	SUR; R23; 20	YMC; R24; 25	YMC; R25; 27	YMC; R26; Ret	WIN; R27; Ret	WIN; R28; Ret	SYD; R29; Ret	SYD; R30; Ret								28th	649
2013	Holden Racing Team	22	Holden VF Commodore	ADE; R1	ADE; R2	SYM; R3	SYM; R4	SYM; R5	PUK; R6	PUK; R7	PUK; R8	PUK; R9	BAR; R10	BAR; R11	BAR; R12	COTA; R13	COTA; R14	COTA; R15	COTA; R16	HID; R17	HID; R18	HID; R19	TOW; R20; PO	TOW; R21; PO	QLD; R22; PO	QLD; R23; PO	QLD; R24; PO	WIN; R25; PO	WIN; R26; PO	WIN; R27; PO	SAN; R28; 5	BAT; R29; Ret	SUR; R30; Ret	SUR; R31; Ret	PHI; R32	PHI; R33	PHI; R34	SYD; R35	SYD; R36			52nd	222
2014	Holden Racing Team	22	Holden VF Commodore	ADE; R1	ADE; R2	ADE; R3	SYM; R4	SYM; R5	SYM; R6	WIN; R7	WIN; R8	WIN; R9	PUK; R10	PUK; R11	PUK; R12	PUK; R13	BAR; R14	BAR; R15	BAR; R16	HID; R17	HID; R18	HID; R19	TOW; R20	TOW; R21	TOW; R22	QLD; R23	QLD; R24	QLD; R25	SMP; R26	SMP; R27	SMP; R28	SAN; R29; 2	BAT; R30; 13	SUR; R31; Ret	SUR; R32; 22	PHI; R33	PHI; R34	PHI; R35	SYD; R36	SYD; R37	SYD; R38	35th	447
2022	Erebus Motorsport	51	Holden ZB Commodore	SMP; R1	SMP; R2	SYM; R3	SYM; R4	SYM; R5	MEL; R6	MEL; R7	MEL; R8	MEL; R9	BAR; R10	BAR; R11	BAR; R12	WIN; R13	WIN; R14	WIN; R15	HID; R16	HID; R17	HID; R18	TOW; R19	TOW; R20	BEN; R21	BEN; R22	BEN; R23	SAN; R24	SAN; R25	SAN; R26	PUK; R27	PUK; R28	PUK; R29	BAT; R30; 11	SUR; R31	SUR; R32	NEW; R33	NEW; R34					41st	144

=== Bathurst 1000 results ===
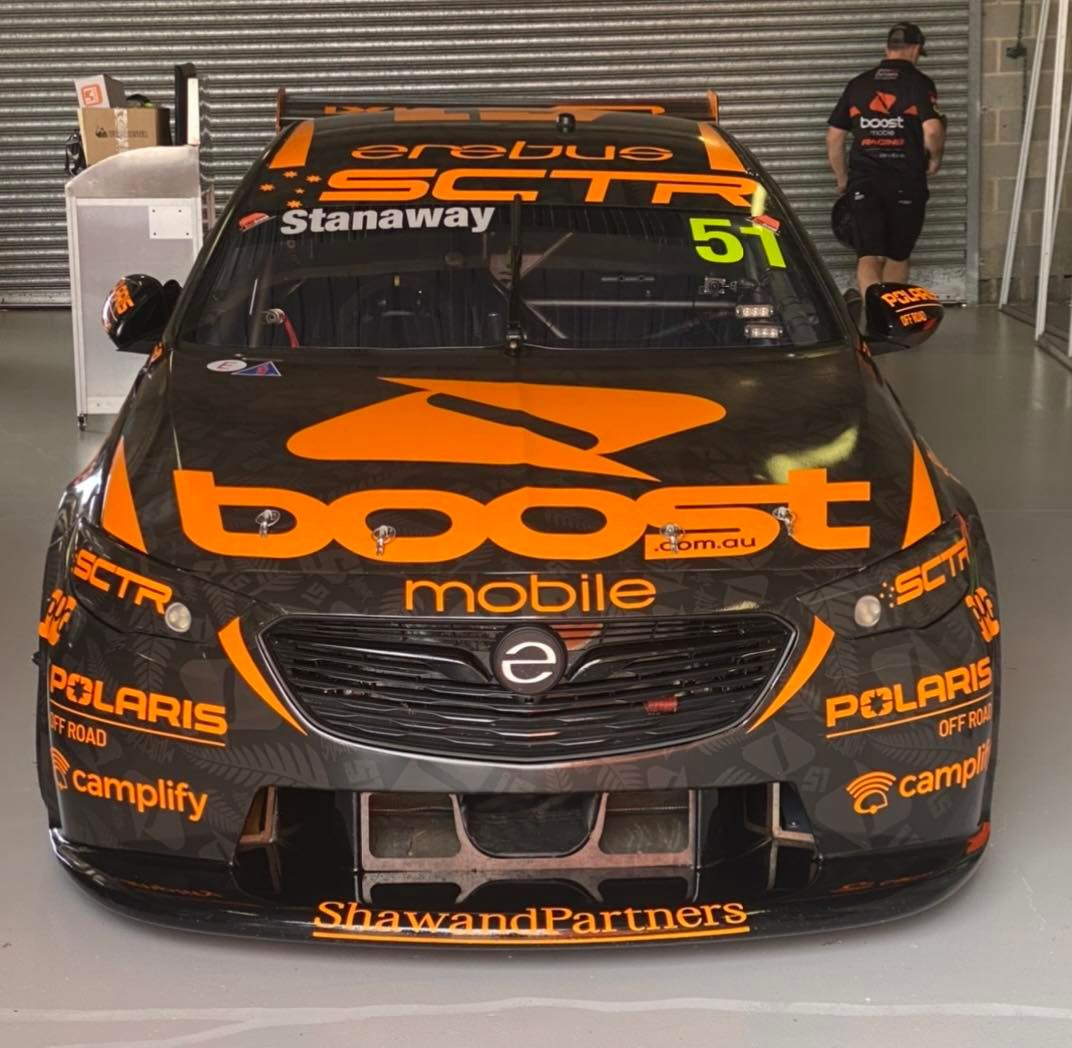
Murphy & Richie Stanaway's 2022 Bathurst 1000 Holden

Year	No.	Team	Car	Co-driver	Position	Laps
1994	56	Bruce Miles	Toyota Carina	(United Kingdom) James Kaye	23rd	136
1995	015	Holden Racing Team	Holden Commodore VR	(Australia) Craig Lowndes	DNF	10
1996	1	Holden Racing Team	Holden Commodore VR	(Australia) Craig Lowndes	**1st**	161
1997	15	Holden Racing Team	Holden Commodore VR	(Australia) Craig Lowndes	DNF	38
1998*	80	Triple Eight Race Engineering	Holden Vectra	(Australia) Russell Ingall	DNF	83
1998	50	Holden Racing Team	Holden Commodore VT	(Australia) Mark Noske	DNF	86
1999	7	Gibson Motorsport	Holden Commodore VT	(New Zealand) Steven Richards	**1st**	161
2000	7	Gibson Motorsport	Holden Commodore VT	(New Zealand) Steven Richards	**3rd**	161
2001	15	HSV Dealer Team	Holden Commodore VX	(Australia) Todd Kelly	**3rd**	161
2002	51	HSV Dealer Team	Holden Commodore VX	(Australia) Todd Kelly	13th	159
2003	51	HSV Dealer Team	Holden Commodore VY	(Australia) Rick Kelly	**1st**	161
2004	15	HSV Dealer Team	Holden Commodore VY	(Australia) Rick Kelly	**1st**	161
2005	51	Paul Weel Racing	Holden Commodore VZ	(Australia) Paul Weel	DNF	144
2006	51	Paul Weel Racing	Holden Commodore VZ	(Australia) Cameron McConville	DNF	104
2007	51	Tasman Motorsport	Holden Commodore VE	(New Zealand) Jason Richards	4th	161
2008	3	Tasman Motorsport	Holden Commodore VE	(New Zealand) Jason Richards	**2nd**	161
2009	51	Tasman Motorsport	Holden Commodore VE	(Australia) Mark Skaife	4th	161
2010	51	Paul Morris Motorsport	Holden Commodore VE	(Denmark) Allan Simonsen	6th	161
2011	11	Kelly Racing	Holden Commodore VE	(Denmark) Allan Simonsen	**3rd**	161
2012	51	Kelly Racing	Holden Commodore VE	(Australia) Owen Kelly	13th	161
2013	22	Holden Racing Team	Holden Commodore VF	(Australia) James Courtney	DNF	85
2014	22	Holden Racing Team	Holden Commodore VF	(Australia) James Courtney	13th	160
2022	51	Erebus Motorsport	Holden Commodore ZB	(New Zealand) Richie Stanaway	11th	161

* Super Touring race

=== Complete American Le Mans Series results ===
(key) (Races in bold indicate pole position) (Races in italics indicate fastest lap)

Year	Entrant	Class	Chassis	Engine	1	2	3	4	5	6	7	8	9	10	11	12	Rank	Points
2000	(United States) Panoz Motor Sports	LMP	Panoz LMP-1 Roadster-S	Élan 6L8 6.0L V8	SEB	CHA	SIL	NÜR	SON	MOS	TEX	ROS	PET	MON	LSV	**ADE** ovr:9 cls:3	36th	24

=== Complete 24 Hours of Le Mans results ===
Year	Team	Co-drivers	Car	Class	Laps	Overall position	Class position
1996	(New Zealand) New Hardware Racing (United Kingdom) Parr Motorsport	(New Zealand) Bill Farmer (United Kingdom) Robert Nearn	Porsche 911 GT2	GT2	313	14th	**2nd**

=== Complete Bathurst 24 Hour results ===
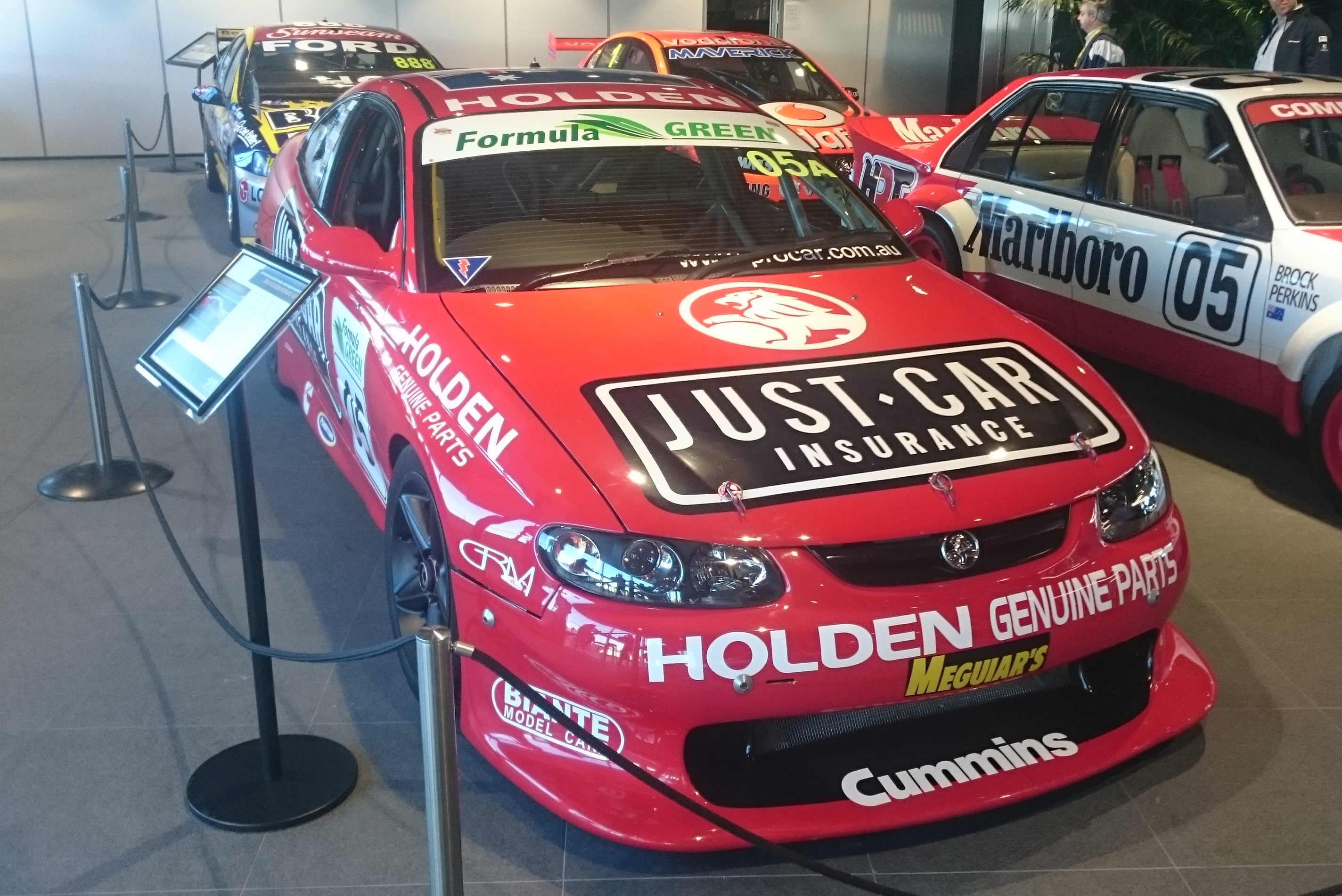
The 2003 Bathurst 24 Hour winning Holden Monaro

Year	Team	Co-drivers	Car	Class	Laps	Overall position	Class position
2003	(Australia) Garry Rogers Motorsport	(Australia) Peter Brock (Australia) Jason Bright (Australia) Todd Kelly	Holden Monaro 427C	A	527	**1st**	**1st**

=== V8SuperTourer ===
In 2011 it was released that in New Zealand they were making a new touring car series, Murphy was instantly interested and after talks with Paul Manuell they decided to make M3 Racing which Richard Moore, Paul Manuell and Greg Murphy would drive their three cars. As soon as Murphy confirmed he would be racing in the 2012 season, New Zealand Businessman Mike Pero signed up to be his major sponsor for the season.

In the 2012 season Murphy had a successful year claiming a pole, 5 race wins and 2 round wins and also the Endurance Championship but because he had to miss two rounds because of back problems he missed out on the overall championship but managed to finish 2nd overall.

The 2013 season Murphy redeemed himself after missing out on the title due to back problems, Murphy managed to win 6 races and finished on the podium 14 times out of 21 races, and after a thrilling final race battle with Ant Pedersen, Murphy won his first SuperTourer title.

==== Complete V8 SuperTourer results ====
Year	Team	No.	Car	1	2	3	4	5	6	7	8	9	10	11	12	13	14	15	16	17	18	19	20	21	Position	Points
2012	M3 Racing	51	Holden VE Commodore	HAM; R1; 1	**HAM**; **R2**; 1	**HAM**; **R3**; 7	RUA; R4	RUA; R5	RUA; R6	MAN; R7; 3	MAN; R8; 3	MAN; R9; 1	HAM; R10; 4	HAM; R11; 5	HAM; R12; 3	TAU; R13	TAU; R14	**PUK**; **R15**; 2	PUK; R16; 1	**PUK**; **R17**; 1	RUA; R18; 13	RUA; R19; 5			2nd	3080
2013	M3 Racing	51	Holden VE Commodore	HAM; R1; 1	**HAM**; **R2**; 1	**HAM**; **R3**; 1	RUA; R4; 2	RUA; R5; 2	RUA; R6; Ret	PUK; R7; 2	PUK; R8; 2	PUK; R9; 1	TAU; R10; 7	TAU; R11; 4	TAU; R12; 10	HAM; R13; 1	HAM; R14; Ret	HAM; R15; 3	HAM; R16; 1	HAM; R17; 10	HAM; R18; 2	PUK; R19; 2	PUK; R20; 5	PUK; R21; 2	1st	3559
2014	M3 Racing	1	Holden VE Commodore	**HIG**; **R1**; 1	**HIG**; **R2**; 1	**HIG**; **R3**; 1	MAN; R4; 1	MAN; R5; 1	MAN; R6; 1	PUK; R7; 1	PUK; R8; 3	PUK; R9; 1	**PUK**; **R10**; 1	**PUK**; **R11**; 1	**PUK**; **R12**; 1	**PUK**; **R13**; 2									1st	1155
2014–15	M3 Racing	1	Holden VE Commodore	TAU; R1; Ret	TAU; R2; 2	TAU; R3; 6	HAM; R4; 2	HAM; R5; 2	**HAM**; **R6**; 3	PUK; R7; 6	PUK; R8; 3	PUK; R9; 4	HAM; R10	HAM; R11	HAM; R12	PUK; R13	PUK; R14	PUK; R15							11th	934

=== TCR New Zealand ===
Year	Team	Car	1	2	3	Position	Points
2021	TrackTec Racing	Audi RS 3 LMS TCR	HIG; R1; 3	HIG; R2; 3	HIG; R3; Ret	6th	120

Sporting positions
Preceded by Craig Baird	Winner of the New Zealand Grand Prix; 1994	Succeeded by Brady Kennett
Preceded by Larry Perkins; Russell Ingall	Winner of the Bathurst 1000; 1996 (with Craig Lowndes)	Succeeded by Geoff Brabham; David Brabham
Preceded by Steven Richards; Jason Bright	Winner of the Bathurst 1000; 1999 (with Steven Richards)	Succeeded by Garth Tander; Jason Bargwanna
Preceded by Mark Skaife; Jim Richards	Winner of the Bathurst 1000; 2003, 2004 (with Rick Kelly)	Succeeded by Mark Skaife; Todd Kelly
Preceded by Garth Tander; Steven Richards; Nathan Pretty; Cameron McConville	Winner of the Bathurst 24 Hour; 2003 (with Peter Brock, Jason Bright; Todd Kelly)	Succeeded by none
Preceded by Scott McLaughlin	Winner of the V8 SuperTourers Championship; 2013 & 2014	Succeeded by Simon Evans
