= River Kennett =

River in Suffolk and Cambridgeshire, England

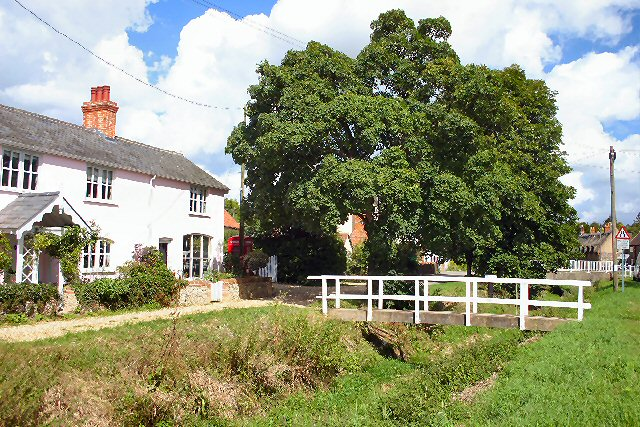
- River Kennett at Dalham, dry in August, 2005

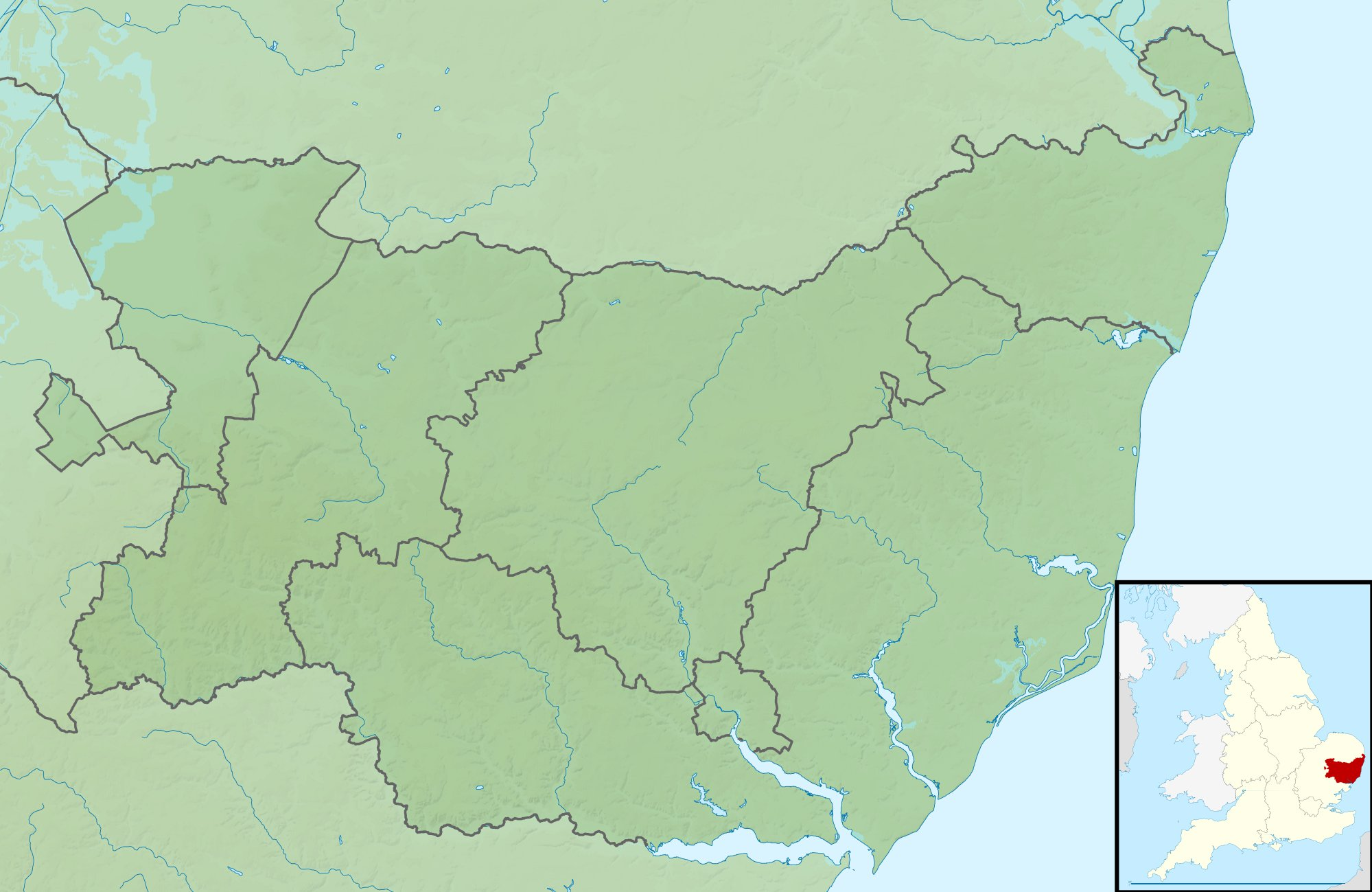
- Location within Suffolk

Location
- Country: England
- County: Suffolk

Physical characteristics
- Source
  - location: near Dalham, Suffolk, East Anglia, England
  - coordinates: 52°13′12″N 0°30′35″W
  - elevation: 108 m (354 ft)
- Mouth: Lee Brook
  - location: near Freckenham, Suffolk, England
  - coordinates: 52°19′0.12″N 0°25′58.8″E
  - elevation: 0 m (0 ft)
- Length: 28 km (17 mi)
- Discharge
  - location: Freckenham

The River Kennett is a river that runs through Suffolk and Cambridgeshire in eastern England.

== Course ==
The River Kennett rises in the hills just west of Cowlinge Hall in western Suffolk at an altitude of around 108m above sea level. It flows north-east to the village of Cowlinge before turning west for around a mile, crossing the county border into Cambridgeshire in the parish of Kirtling. After only a couple of miles in Cambridgeshire it crosses back into Suffolk just north of Lidgate and flows north through Dalham and Moulton. At Kentford it forms the Suffolk-Cambridgeshire border for around a mile followed by a mile in Cambridgeshire just north of the village of Kennett, after which it again forms the county border for around three miles as it runs past Red Lodge.

As it reaches Freckenham, it joins Lee Brook, a tributary of the River Lark, just south of Freckenham, at an altitude of around 10m. The river is generally dry in the summertime.

== Water level ==
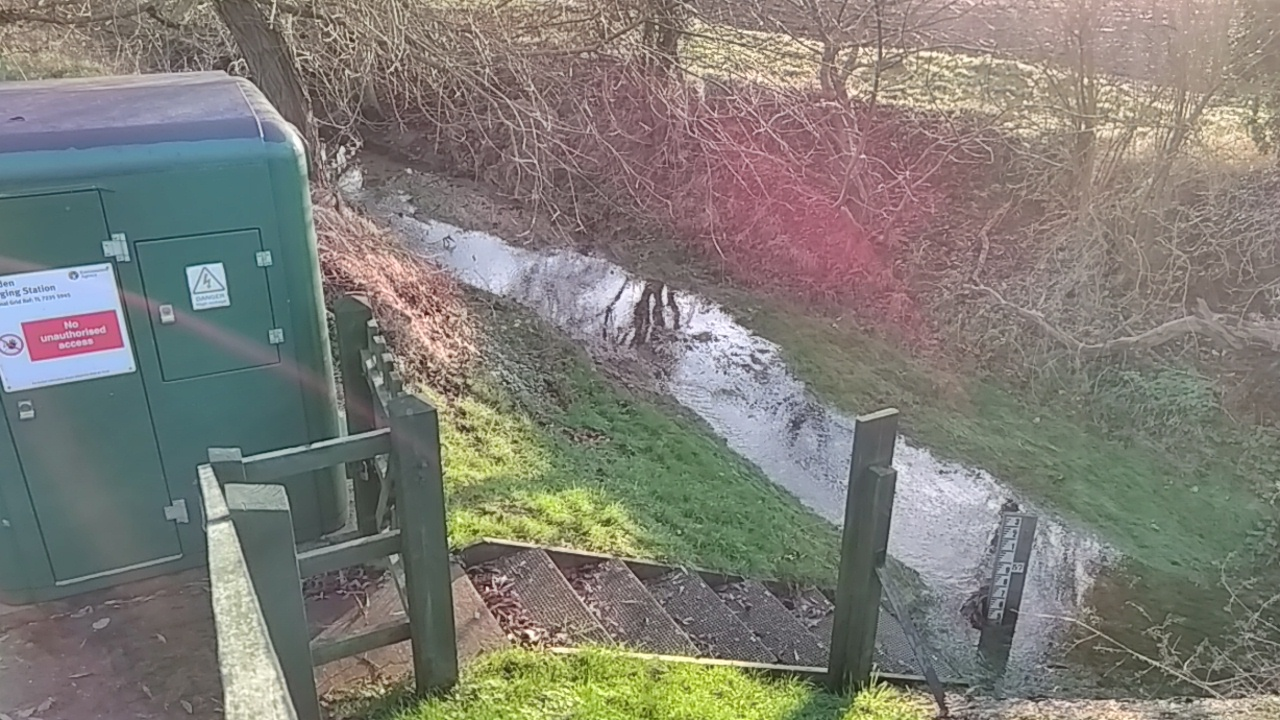
River Kennett at Ousden Gauging Station, December 2019

In recent years, starting from 2015, the river's water level has significantly decreased, with even the winter months seeing extremely low levels. Along the sections that pass through the Lidgate, Ousden, and Dalham areas, the river has occasionally dried up during winter. The consistent flow of water through Moulton, whether in winter or summer, was primarily due to the presence of the sewage treatment works situated between Dalham and Moulton. Fortunately, a change took place in early December 2019 when, thanks to a substantial amount of rainfall, the river in the aforementioned areas began to flow once more, albeit as a modest stream.

This current situation is a far cry from the winter of 2013–2014 when extreme flooding was experienced. In Moulton, on 7 February 2014, the river swelled to the point of overflowing onto the road adjacent to the church, with houses at one point facing the imminent threat of inundation.

== History ==
The villages of Kentford and Kennett both derive their names from the river. The name of the river is Celtic in origin, and its meaning is unknown.

The exact course of the river has changed many times over the centuries. Some evidence of this can be inferred from its deviations from the Kennett parish boundary.

At Moulton the river passes under a Grade-II*-listed 15th-century packhorse bridge. This bridge has four arches, indicating that the river was larger when the bridge was constructed.

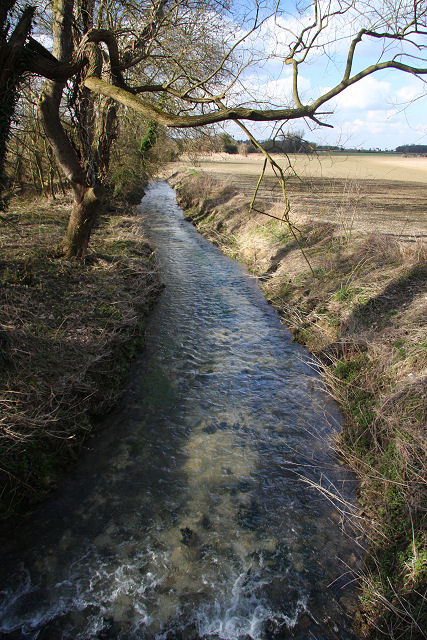
River Kennett at Badlingham, near Chippenham, Cambridgeshire

The 15th-century Moulton Packhorse Bridge
