= Euromarque Motorsport Park =

Motorsport track in Christchurch, New Zealand

Euromarque Motorsport Park, Ruapuna
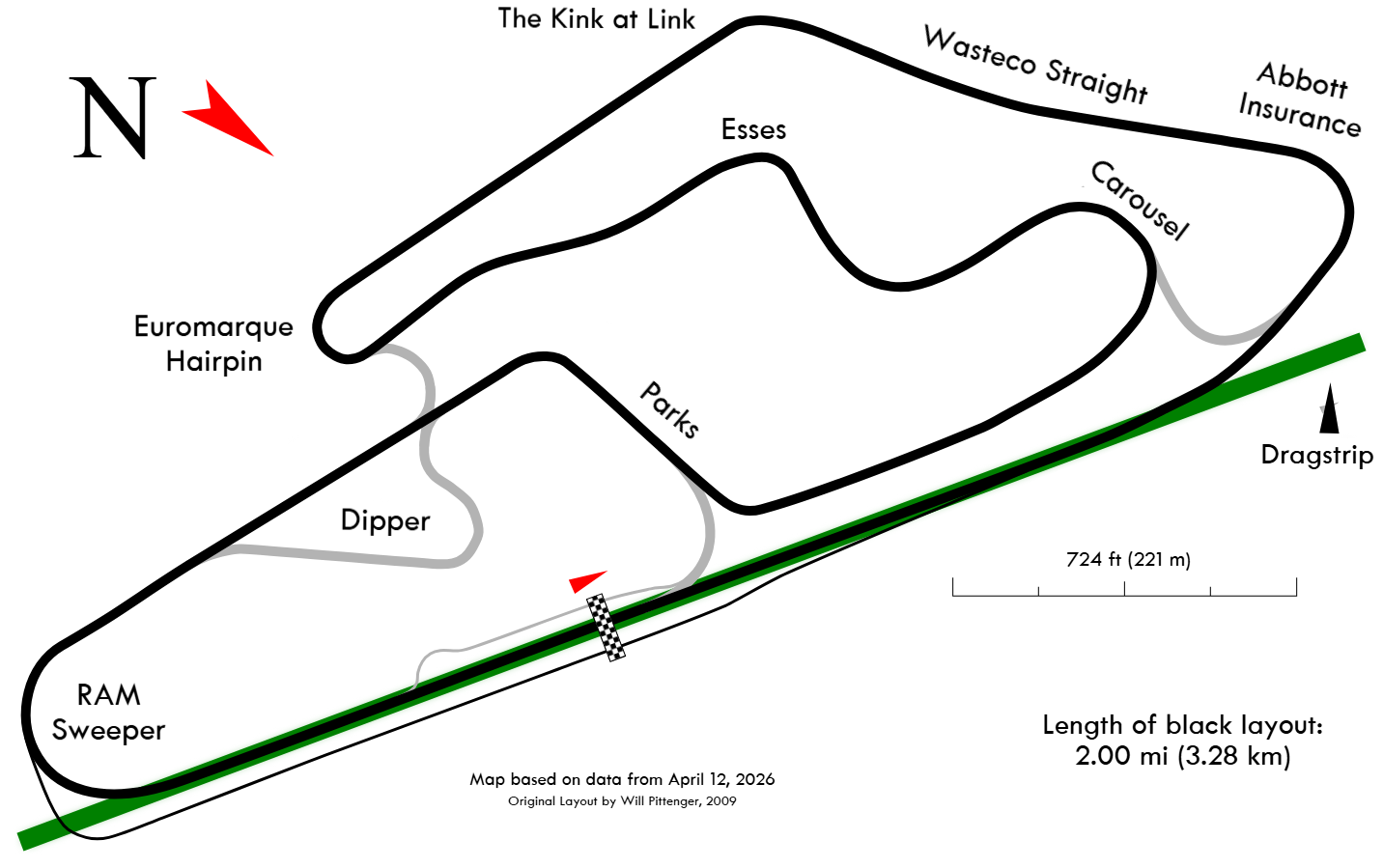
- Full Circuit (1993–present)
- Location: Christchurch, New Zealand
- Coordinates: 43°31′50″S 172°28′47″E
- FIA Grade: 3
- Owner: Canterbury Car Club Inc
- Opened: November 1963; 62 years ago
- Former names: Mike Pero Motorsport Park (2013–2023); Powerbuilt Raceway at Ruapuna Park (2004–2013); Ruapana Park (1963–2003)
- Major events: Current: Supercars Championship; Christchurch Super 440 (2026); Former: FR Oceania (2005–2006, 2008, 2015–2018, 2024); Toyota 86 Championship (2015–2018, 2022, 2024); Lady Wigram Trophy (2003–2004, 2006–2012, 2015–2018); New Zealand Grand Prix (1998–1999); New Zealand V8s (2002, 2004–2011, 2015–2018); V8SuperTourer (2012)

Full Circuit (1993–present)
- Length: 3.330 km (2.069 mi)
- Turns: 11
- Race lap record: 1.15.810 ( (New Zealand) Scott Dixon, Reynard 92D, 1998, F3000)

Original Circuit (1963–1992)
- Length: 1.609 km (1.000 mi)
- Turns: 4

Euromarque Motorsport Park (often referred to as Ruapuna) is a permanent motor racing circuit owned and operated by the Canterbury Car Club Inc on land leased from the Christchurch City Council. It is located at 107 Hasketts Road in Templeton, 13 km (8.1 mi) west of Christchurch, New Zealand. It was opened as Ruapana Park in 1963, and between 2004 and 2013 was known as Powerbuilt Raceway at Ruapuna Park. Mike Pero joined the circuit as title sponsor from 2013–2023, as Mike Pero Motorsport Park. In the early parts of February 2023, the sponsorship deal was over, and Euromarque became the new title sponsor.

The track also features a drag strip, pit garages, racing school, speedway circuit and even a radio controlled car circuit. There are a number of configurations of the circuit with licences from FIA Grade 3 to National grades 1, 2 and 3.

== History ==
The track was opened in November 1963. The circuit was a fairly simple sealed surface road course, at just a mile in length and comprising essentially a flat tri-oval with an extended main straight down to a hairpin bend. In 1976 the main straight was widened and a staging area added to allow drag racing to take place. The biggest change in the circuit's history came in 1993 when it was extended to 3.330 km (2.069 mi), along with other renovations.

== The circuit ==
The track surface is hot mix bitumen and runs for 3.330 km (2.069 mi) in a anticlockwise direction with many fast sweeping corners. It rewards smooth and tidy drivers.

It supports six layouts, from the 1.200 km (0.746 mi) "A Track" to the 3.380 km (2.100 mi) "Grand Prix with dipper".

The track features on the motorsport racing simulation game Project CARS 2 as Ruapana Park.

=== Layout configurations ===
Euromarque Motorsport Park layout configurations
Original Circuit (1963–1992)

'A' Trioval Circuit (1993–present)

'A' Trioval Circuit + Dipper (1993–present)

'B' Circuit (1993–present)

Club Circuit (1993–present)

Outer Circuit (1993–present)

Grand Prix Circuit (1993–present)

Long Circuit (1993–present)

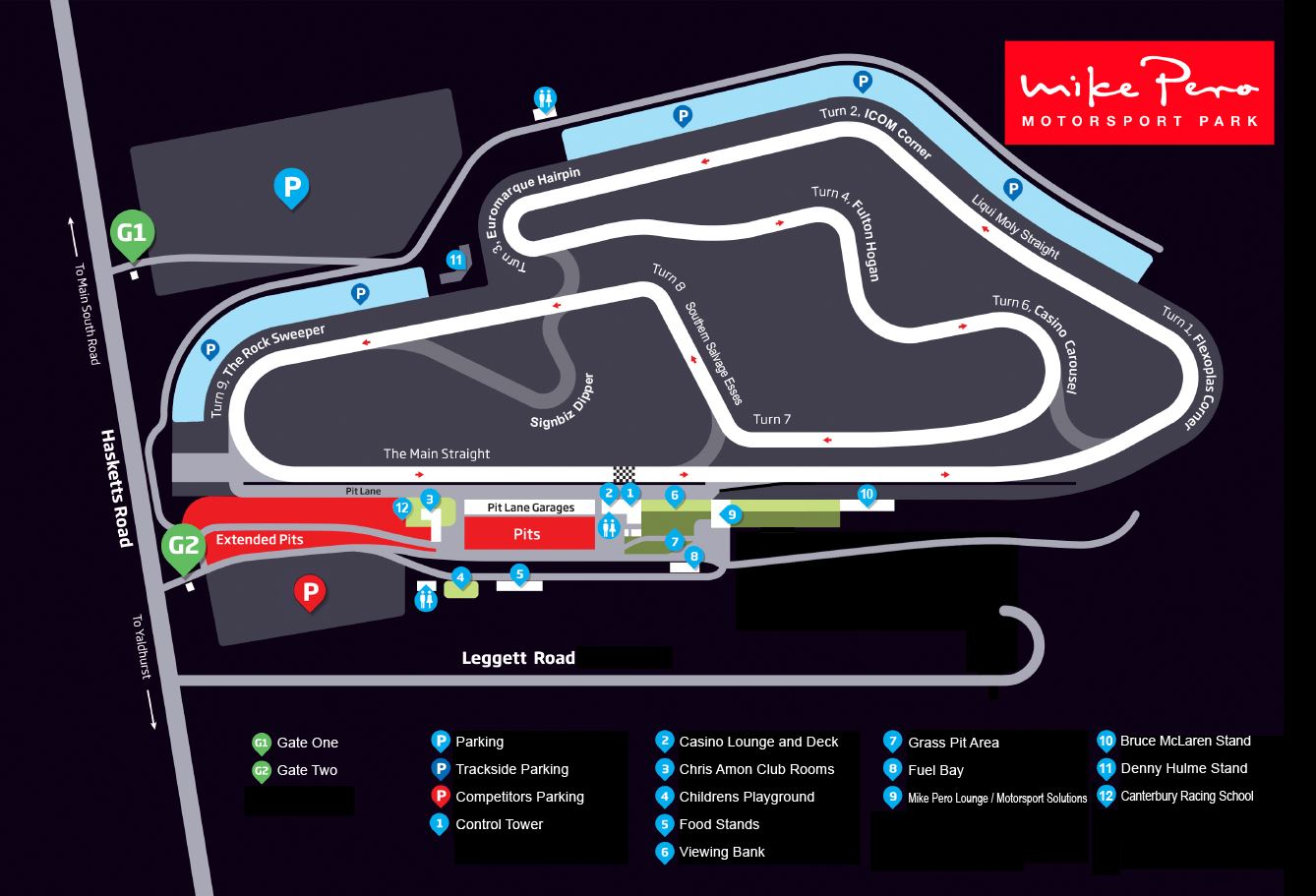
Ruapuna Circuit (Euromarque Motorsport Park) map

== Events ==
The circuit hosts both 2 and 4 wheeled events. The "Skope Classic" is a major annual event held at the track. The two-day-event includes practice and racing on Saturday and racing in classes on Sunday for classic and historic cars. It is one of the events of Southern Festival of Speed.

The track hosted the New Zealand Grand Prix in 1998 and 1999. New Zealand born driver Simon Wills won both races in his Reynard 94D. In May 2025, Supercars announced that, for the first time, a second New Zealand event would be added to the 2026 calendar, joining the Taupō Supercars round at Taupo International Motorsport Park. The initial deal was for three years and included various upgrades to the circuit.

== Naming rights ==
Since 2013, Mike Pero, founder of Mike Pero Mortgages and Real Estate, had a naming rights sponsorship deal to Ruapuna, which was known as Mike Pero Motorsport Park. This deal ended in 2023, with Euromarque replacing.

For 10 years before, the naming rights had been held by Powerbuilt Tools.

== Lap Records ==
The official lap record for the Euromarque Motorsport Park is 1:15.810, set by Scott Dixon on 5 December 1998. While the unofficial all-time track record is 1:11.265, set by Liam Lawson in a Rodin FZED on 21 January 2022. As of April 2026, the fastest official race lap records at the Euromarque Motorsport Park are listed as:

Category	Time	Driver	Vehicle	Date
Full Circuit: 3.330 km (2.069 mi) (1993–present)
Formula 3000	1:15.810	(New Zealand) Scott Dixon	Reynard 92D	5 December 1998
Formula 5000	1:16.126	(New Zealand) Blake Knowles	McRae GM1	8 February 2026
Toyota Racing Series	1:17.062	(United Kingdom) Lando Norris	Toyota FT-50	16 January 2016
Formula Regional	1:17.493	(South Korea) Michael Shin	Tatuus FT-60	11 February 2024
Formula 3	1:18.099	(New Zealand) Daniel Gaunt	Dallara F301	25 January 2004
GT3	1:18.742	(New Zealand) Jonny Reid	Audi R8 LMS GT3	8 September 2023
Formula Atlantic	1:20.143	(New Zealand) Ken Smith	Swift DB4	3 November 2013
LMP3	1:21.259	(New Zealand) Steve Ross	Ligier JS P320	5 September 2026
OSCA Super Saloons	1:21.458	(Australia) Luke Youlden	Ford Mustang	7 January 2007
Supercars Championship	1:21.925	(New Zealand) Matt Payne	Ford Mustang S650	19 April 2026
Porsche Carrera Cup	1:22.204	(New Zealand) Jarrod Owens	Porsche 911 (991 II) GT3 Cup	9 September 2023
V8SuperTourer	1:24.478	(New Zealand) Scott McLaughlin	Holden Commodore (VE)	25 November 2012
GT4	1:25.835	(New Zealand) Mac Templeton	Porsche Cayman GT4	2 October 2026
TCR	1:26.071	(New Zealand) Blake Knowles	Hyundai i30 N TCR	27 September 2024
Central Muscle Cars	1:26.316	(New Zealand) Andy Knight	Chevrolet Camaro	8 February 2026
Trans-Am Australia	1:26.390	(Australia) Nathan Herne	Dodge Challenger	11 February 2024
NZ Touring Cars (TLX)	1:26.813	(Australia) Jason Bargwanna	Toyota Camry	17 January 2015
Mainland Muscle Cars	1:27.318	(New Zealand) Brent Collins	Mazda RX-7	1 November 2015
Formula Ford	1:28.290	(New Zealand) Mitch Evans	Van Diemen	30 November 2008
NZ Touring Cars (TL)	1:30.122	(New Zealand) Tim Edgell	Ford Falcon (BA)	28 November 2010
Historic Touring Cars	1:30.264	(New Zealand) Greg Murphy	BMW M3 E36 Supertourer	1 February 2025
NZ Touring Cars Championship	1:35.565	(New Zealand) Jason Richards	Nissan Primera	07 January 2001
Toyota 86 Championship	1:35.846	(New Zealand) Ash Blewett	Toyota 86	18 January 2015
Mazda Racing Series	1:36.704	(New Zealand) Chris White Jr	Mazda RX8	10 February 2024
Formula Junior	1:37.932	(United States) Robert Hoemke	Lola Mk5	8 February 2026
NZV8 Utes	1:39.200	(New Zealand) Caine Lobb	Holden Commodore	1 May 2008
Mini 7	1:44.582	(New Zealand) Gary Johnstone	Mini Cooper	4 April 2004
Ssangyong Racing Series	1:55.389	(New Zealand) Daniel Connor	Ssangyong Actyon	21 March 2015

== Ruapuna Speedway ==
Adjacent to the main circuit (on the south side) is the Ruapuna Speedway. The track has hosted important motorcycle speedway events, including multiple qualifying rounds of the Speedway World Championship starting in 1976 and the New Zealand Solo Championship on 17 occasions from 1965 to 2007. The track is operated by the Christchurch Speedway Association, and has no relation other than the name and land it shares, with the paved circuit.
