= 2015–16 Toyota Finance 86 Championship =

Seasons
- ← 2014–15 2016–17 →

The 2015–2016 Toyota Finance 86 Championship was the third running of the Toyota Finance 86 Championship. The championship began on 7 November 2015 at Pukekohe Park Raceway and finished on 27 March 2016 at Taupo Motorsport Park after eighteen races held at six meetings.

== Race calendar ==
Round		Circuit	Date	Map
1	R1	Pukekohe Park Raceway (Pukekohe, Auckland Region)	7 November 2015	2015–16 Toyota Finance 86 Championship is located in New Zealand
1	R2	Pukekohe Park Raceway (Pukekohe, Auckland Region)	8 November 2015	2015–16 Toyota Finance 86 Championship is located in New Zealand
1	R3	Pukekohe Park Raceway (Pukekohe, Auckland Region)	8 November 2015	2015–16 Toyota Finance 86 Championship is located in New Zealand
2	R1	Hampton Downs Motorsport Park (Hampton Downs, North Waikato)	28 November 2015	2015–16 Toyota Finance 86 Championship is located in New Zealand
2	R2	Hampton Downs Motorsport Park (Hampton Downs, North Waikato)	29 November 2015	2015–16 Toyota Finance 86 Championship is located in New Zealand
2	R3	Hampton Downs Motorsport Park (Hampton Downs, North Waikato)	29 November 2015	2015–16 Toyota Finance 86 Championship is located in New Zealand
3	R1	Mike Pero Motorsport Park (Christchurch, Canterbury Region)	16 January 2016	2015–16 Toyota Finance 86 Championship is located in New Zealand
3	R2	Mike Pero Motorsport Park (Christchurch, Canterbury Region)	17 January 2016	2015–16 Toyota Finance 86 Championship is located in New Zealand
3	R3	Mike Pero Motorsport Park (Christchurch, Canterbury Region)	17 January 2016	2015–16 Toyota Finance 86 Championship is located in New Zealand
4	R1	Teretonga Park (Invercargill, Southland Region)	23 January 2016	2015–16 Toyota Finance 86 Championship is located in New Zealand
4	R2	Teretonga Park (Invercargill, Southland Region)	24 January 2016	2015–16 Toyota Finance 86 Championship is located in New Zealand
4	R3	Teretonga Park (Invercargill, Southland Region)	24 January 2016	2015–16 Toyota Finance 86 Championship is located in New Zealand
5	R1	Manfeild Autocourse (Feilding, Manawatū District)	13 February 2016	2015–16 Toyota Finance 86 Championship is located in New Zealand
5	R2	Manfeild Autocourse (Feilding, Manawatū District)	14 February 2016	2015–16 Toyota Finance 86 Championship is located in New Zealand
5	R3	Manfeild Autocourse (Feilding, Manawatū District)	14 February 2016	2015–16 Toyota Finance 86 Championship is located in New Zealand
6	R1	Bruce McLaren Motorsport Park (Taupō, Waikato)	26 March 2016	2015–16 Toyota Finance 86 Championship is located in New Zealand
6	R2	Bruce McLaren Motorsport Park (Taupō, Waikato)	27 March 2016	2015–16 Toyota Finance 86 Championship is located in New Zealand
6	R3	Bruce McLaren Motorsport Park (Taupō, Waikato)	27 March 2016	2015–16 Toyota Finance 86 Championship is located in New Zealand

== Teams and drivers ==
All teams were New-Zealand registered.

Team	No.	Driver	Rounds
Ascent Motorsport	4	(New Zealand) Reid Harker	All
Post Haste Racing	5	(New Zealand) Craig Innes	2–3
Post Haste Racing	5	(New Zealand) Jamie McNee	4
TS Racing	6	(New Zealand) Thomas Stokes	All
Alex Sherie Racing	8	(New Zealand) Alex Sherie	1–2
Auckland City Toyota	8	(New Zealand) Rick Armstrong	3
	8	(Denmark) Carsten Kahler	4
WKS/Lightingplus - Christchurch	9	(United Kingdom) Tiffany Chittenden	1–5
Ken Smith Motor Racing	11	(New Zealand) Ken Smith	1–2
Ken Smith Motor Racing	11	(New Zealand) Miles Cockram	3–4
West City Motorsport	15	(New Zealand) Bruce Thomlinson	1–2
West City Motorsport	15	(New Zealand) Jayden Dodge	3, 5–6
West City Motorsport	66	(New Zealand) Ash Blewett	All
CareVets New Zealand	17	(New Zealand) Michael Scott	All
CareVets New Zealand	18	(New Zealand) Ryan Yardley	All
Neil Allport Motorsport	22	(New Zealand) John Penny	All
Jacob Smith Racing	27	(New Zealand) Jacob Smith	All
Paul Kelly Motorsport	90	(New Zealand) Paul Kelly	1
Quin Motorsport	91	(New Zealand) Callum Quin	All
Lightfoot Motorsport	96	(New Zealand) Mike Lightfoot	1–3, 5–6
Lightfoot Motorsport	96	(New Zealand) Grant Aitken	4
Stealth Motosport	98	(New Zealand) Jaxon Evans	3–5
Neale Motorsport; Auckland City Toyota	99	(New Zealand) Matt Hamilton	1–2, 4–5
Neale Motorsport; Auckland City Toyota	99	(New Zealand) Marcus Armstrong	3
EC Motorsport	111	(New Zealand) Caleb Cross	1–3

== Results and standings ==
=== Season summary ===
All rounds were held in New Zealand. The round one in Pukekohe Park Raceway was held in support of the V8 Supercars. Rounds 3, 4 and 5 were held with the Toyota Racing Series.

Round		Circuit	Pole position	Fastest lap	Winning driver	Winning team	Round winner(s)
2015
1	R1	Pukekohe Park Raceway	(New Zealand) Ash Blewett	(New Zealand) Ash Blewett	(New Zealand) Ash Blewett	West City Motorsport	(New Zealand) Ash Blewett
1	R2	Pukekohe Park Raceway		(New Zealand) Ash Blewett	(New Zealand) Ash Blewett	West City Motorsport	(New Zealand) Ash Blewett
1	R3	Pukekohe Park Raceway	(New Zealand) Ash Blewett	(New Zealand) Callum Quin	(New Zealand) Ash Blewett	West City Motorsport	(New Zealand) Ash Blewett
2	R1	Hampton Downs Motorsport Park	(New Zealand) Ash Blewett	(New Zealand) Ash Blewett	(New Zealand) Ash Blewett	West City Motorsport	(New Zealand) Ash Blewett
2	R2	Hampton Downs Motorsport Park		(New Zealand) Ash Blewett	(New Zealand) Ash Blewett	West City Motorsport	(New Zealand) Ash Blewett
2	R3	Hampton Downs Motorsport Park	(New Zealand) Ash Blewett	(New Zealand) Ash Blewett	(New Zealand) Ash Blewett	West City Motorsport	(New Zealand) Ash Blewett
2016
3	R1	Mike Pero Motorsport Park	(New Zealand) Ash Blewett	(New Zealand) Jayden Dodge	(New Zealand) Michael Scott	CareVets New Zealand	(New Zealand) Ash Blewett
3	R2	Mike Pero Motorsport Park		(New Zealand) Ash Blewett	(New Zealand) Ash Blewett	West City Motorsport	(New Zealand) Ash Blewett
3	R3	Mike Pero Motorsport Park	(New Zealand) Ash Blewett	(New Zealand) Marcus Armstrong	(New Zealand) Ash Blewett	West City Motorsport	(New Zealand) Ash Blewett
4	R1	Teretonga Park	(New Zealand) Callum Quin	(New Zealand) Jaxon Evans	(New Zealand) Callum Quin	Quin Motorsport	(New Zealand) Callum Quin
4	R2	Teretonga Park		(New Zealand) Ash Blewett	(New Zealand) Ryan Yardley	CareVets New Zealand	(New Zealand) Callum Quin
4	R3	Teretonga Park	(New Zealand) Callum Quin	(New Zealand) Ash Blewett	(New Zealand) Michael Scott	CareVets New Zealand	(New Zealand) Callum Quin
5	R1	Manfeild Autocourse	(New Zealand) Ash Blewett	(New Zealand) Ash Blewett	(New Zealand) Ash Blewett	West City Motorsport	(New Zealand) Ash Blewett
5	R2	Manfeild Autocourse		(New Zealand) Callum Quin	(New Zealand) John Penny	Neil Allport Motorsport	(New Zealand) Ash Blewett
5	R3	Manfeild Autocourse	(New Zealand) Ash Blewett	(New Zealand) Ash Blewett	(New Zealand) Ash Blewett	West City Motorsport	(New Zealand) Ash Blewett
6	R1	Bruce McLaren Motorsport Park	(New Zealand) Ash Blewett	(New Zealand) Ryan Yardley	(New Zealand) Ash Blewett	West City Motorsport	(New Zealand) Ryan Yardley
6	R2	Bruce McLaren Motorsport Park		(New Zealand) Taylor Cockerton	(New Zealand) Ryan Yardley	CareVets New Zealand	(New Zealand) Ryan Yardley
6	R3	Bruce McLaren Motorsport Park	(New Zealand) Ash Blewett	(New Zealand) Callum Quin	(New Zealand) Michael Scott	CareVets New Zealand	(New Zealand) Ryan Yardley

=== Championship standings ===
In order for a driver to score championship points, they had to complete at least 75% of the race winner's distance, and be running at the finish. All races counted towards the final championship standings.

Scoring system

Position	1st	2nd	3rd	4th	5th	6th	7th	8th	9th	10th	11th	12th	13th	14th	15th	16th	17th
Points	75	67	60	54	49	45	42	39	36	33	30	28	26	24	22	20	18

Pos.	Driver	PUK			HAM			RUA			TER			MAN			TAU			Pts
Pos.	Driver	R1	R2	R3	R1	R2	R3	R1	R2	R3	R1	R2	R3	R1	R2	R3	R1	R2	R3	Pts
1	(New Zealand) Ash Blewett	**1**	1	**1**	**1**	1	**1**	**2**	1	**1**	4	3	2	**1**	3	'**1'**	**1**	4	DNS	1163
2	(New Zealand) Callum Quin	2	2	2	3	4	2	5	6	4	**1**	5	**3**	2	4	2	8	5	4	1044
3	(New Zealand) John Penny (M)	3	4	4	2	2	4	3	2	5	2	2	5	3	1	6	7	4	6	1036
4	(New Zealand) Michael Scott	5	5	3	15†	Ret	7	1	7	8	3	8	1	4	5	10	4	6	1	862
5	(New Zealand) Ryan Yardley (R)	4	7	5	12	Ret	11	8	9	2	9	1	6	6	6	9	2	1	3	832
6	(New Zealand) Jacob Smith (R)	7	6	7	9	6	15†	4	4	6	Ret	11	9	8	2	3	3	11	2	772
7	(New Zealand) Reid Harker (R)	5	DNS	DNS	5	3	5	6	5	13	5	9	10	7	12	8	6	3	9	646
8	(New Zealand) Mike Lightfoot (M)	9	9	8	7	5	6	7	17	9				12	Ret	12	11	9	7	512
9	(New Zealand) Matt Hamilton	6	3	6	4	Ret	3				Ret	7	7	9	11	5				463
10	(New Zealand) Thomas Stokes (R)	13	13	13	14	Ret	13	9	15	12	Ret	12	11	13	8	13	12	10	11	454
11	(New Zealand) Jayden Dodge (R)							Ret	8	7				12	9	7	5	2	5	352
12	(New Zealand) Jaxon Evans (R)							Ret	10	10	6	4	8	5	10	4				340
13	(United Kingdom) Tiffany Chittenden (R)	14	14	11	10	9	9	Ret	13	11	Ret	Ret	Ret	11	7	11				339
14	(New Zealand) Caleb Cross (R)	11	11	12	6	11†	14	Ret	11	14										243
15	(New Zealand) Ken Smith (M)	10	8	9	8	10	8													219
16	(New Zealand) Bruce Thomlinson (M)	12	12	14	13	8	12													173
17	(New Zealand) Marcus Armstrong							11	3	3										150
18	(New Zealand) Paul Kelly (M)	8	10	10							7	Ret	DNS							141
19	(New Zealand) Craig Innes				11	7	10	Ret	14	Ret										129
20	(New Zealand) Taylor Cockerton (R)																9	7	8	117
21	(New Zealand) Martin Short (R)																10	8	10	105
22	(Australia) Grant Aitken										8	10	12							103
23	(New Zealand) Jamie McNee										WD	5	4							99
24	(New Zealand) Rick Armstrong (M)							10	12	Ret										61
25	(New Zealand) Miles Cockram (R)							Ret	16	Ret	Ret	13	Ret							46
26	(New Zealand) Alex Sherie (R)	15	Ret	DNS	WD	DNS	WD													22
Guest drivers ineligible for points
	(Denmark) Carsten Kahler										10	14	Ret							0
Pos.	Driver	R1	R2	R3	R1	R2	R3	R1	R2	R3	R1	R2	R3	R1	R2	R3	R1	R2	R3	Pts
Pos.	Driver	PUK			HAM			RUA			TER			MAN			TAU			Pts

Colour	Result
Gold	Winner
Silver	Second place
Bronze	Third place
Green	Points classification
Blue	Non-points classification
Blue	Non-classified finish (NC)
Purple	Retired, not classified (Ret)
Red	Did not qualify (DNQ)
Red	Did not pre-qualify (DNPQ)
Black	Disqualified (DSQ)
White	Did not start (DNS)
White	Withdrew (WD)
White	Race cancelled (C)
Blank	Did not practice (DNP)
Blank	Did not arrive (DNA)
Blank	Excluded (EX)

**Bold** – Pole
Italics – Fastest Lap
(M) – Driver aged 40 over
(R) – Rookie
