= 2016–17 New Zealand Formula Ford Championship =

Motor racing competition

The 2016–17 New Zealand Formula Ford Championship was a motor racing championship for drivers of Formula Ford racing cars. It was the 46th national series for Formula Fords to be held in New Zealand. The season began at Timaru International Motor Raceway on 12 November 2016 and concluded at Manfeild: Circuit Chris Amon on 12 February 2017.

Liam Lawson dominated the championship winning 14 out of the 15 races driving a Mygale SJ08A. As part of winning the title, Lawson received an invitation to an international ‘shoot-out’ for a fully-supported drive in the 2018 U.S. F2000 National Championship worth US$200,000. Ethan Anderson was the only driver to beat Lawson in a race throughout the year, winning in the opening race at Teretonga Park.

In the regional championships, Michael Collins won his third South Island Formula Ford Championship.

== Calendar ==
Each circuit hosted three races in each round of the championship.

Round	Circuit	Date	Supporting	Map of circuit locations
2016				2016–17 New Zealand Formula Ford Championship is located in New Zealand
1	Timaru International Motor Raceway (Timaru, Canterbury)	12 November		2016–17 New Zealand Formula Ford Championship is located in New Zealand
2017				2016–17 New Zealand Formula Ford Championship is located in New Zealand
2	Euromarque Motorsport Park (Christchurch, Canterbury)	14–15 January	Toyota Racing Series; Toyota Finance 86 Championship; NZ Touring Cars Championship	2016–17 New Zealand Formula Ford Championship is located in New Zealand
3	Teretonga Park (Invercargill, Southland)	21–22 January	Toyota Racing Series; Toyota Finance 86 Championship; NZ Touring Cars Championship	2016–17 New Zealand Formula Ford Championship is located in New Zealand
4	Taupo International Motorsport Park (Taupō, Waikato)	4–5 February	Toyota Racing Series	2016–17 New Zealand Formula Ford Championship is located in New Zealand
5	Manfeild: Circuit Chris Amon (Feilding, Manawatū)	11–12 February	Toyota Racing Series; Toyota Finance 86 Championship; NZ Touring Cars Championship	2016–17 New Zealand Formula Ford Championship is located in New Zealand

== Results and standings ==
=== Season summary ===
Rnd		Circuit	Pole position	Fastest lap	Winning driver	Winning team
1	R1	Timaru International Motor Raceway (Timaru, Canterbury)	(New Zealand) Liam Lawson	(New Zealand) Liam Lawson	(New Zealand) Liam Lawson	Liam Lawson Motorsport
1	R2	Timaru International Motor Raceway (Timaru, Canterbury)		(New Zealand) Liam Lawson	(New Zealand) Liam Lawson	Liam Lawson Motorsport
1	R3	Timaru International Motor Raceway (Timaru, Canterbury)		(New Zealand) Liam Lawson	(New Zealand) Liam Lawson	Liam Lawson Motorsport
2	R1	Euromarque Motorsport Park (Christchurch, Canterbury)	(New Zealand) Liam Lawson	(New Zealand) Liam Lawson	(New Zealand) Liam Lawson	Liam Lawson Motorsport
2	R2	Euromarque Motorsport Park (Christchurch, Canterbury)		(New Zealand) Liam Lawson	(New Zealand) Liam Lawson	Liam Lawson Motorsport
2	R3	Euromarque Motorsport Park (Christchurch, Canterbury)		(New Zealand) Liam Lawson	(New Zealand) Liam Lawson	Liam Lawson Motorsport
3	R1	Teretonga Park (Invercargill, Southland)	(New Zealand) Liam Lawson	(New Zealand) Ethan Anderson	(New Zealand) Ethan Anderson	Ethan Anderson Racing
3	R2	Teretonga Park (Invercargill, Southland)		(New Zealand) Liam Lawson	(New Zealand) Liam Lawson	Liam Lawson Motorsport
3	R3	Teretonga Park (Invercargill, Southland)		(New Zealand) Liam Lawson	(New Zealand) Liam Lawson	Liam Lawson Motorsport
4	R1	Taupo International Motorsport Park (Taupō, Waikato)	(New Zealand) Liam Lawson	(New Zealand) Liam Lawson	(New Zealand) Liam Lawson	Liam Lawson Motorsport
4	R2	Taupo International Motorsport Park (Taupō, Waikato)		(New Zealand) Liam Lawson	(New Zealand) Liam Lawson	Liam Lawson Motorsport
4	R3	Taupo International Motorsport Park (Taupō, Waikato)		(New Zealand) Liam Lawson	(New Zealand) Liam Lawson	Liam Lawson Motorsport
5	R1	Manfeild: Circuit Chris Amon (Feilding, Manawatū)	(New Zealand) Liam Lawson	(New Zealand) Jordan Michels	(New Zealand) Liam Lawson	Liam Lawson Motorsport
5	R2	Manfeild: Circuit Chris Amon (Feilding, Manawatū)		(New Zealand) Liam Lawson	(New Zealand) Liam Lawson	Liam Lawson Motorsport
5	R3	Manfeild: Circuit Chris Amon (Feilding, Manawatū)		(New Zealand) Jordan Michels	(New Zealand) Liam Lawson	Liam Lawson Motorsport

=== Championship standings ===
Pos.	Driver	TIM			RUA			TER			TAU			MAN			Points
Pos.	Driver	R1	R2	R3	R1	R2	R3	R1	R2	R3	R1	R2	R3	R1	R2	R3	Points
1	(New Zealand) Liam Lawson	1	1	1	1	1	1	2	1	1	1	1	1	1	1	1	605
2	(New Zealand) Michael Collins	2	2	2	2	2	2	3	3	Ret	2	2	3	2	2	2	478
3	(New Zealand) Jordan Michels	3	3	Ret	3	3	4	5	2	2	4	4	2	3	3	3	432
4	(New Zealand) Ethan Anderson	7	4	3	4	4	3	1	6	3	3	Ret	14	5	5	6	383
5	(New Zealand) Grant Campbell	5	6	4	11	9	10	12	Ret	7	9	7	7	9	8	9	281
6	(New Zealand) Stephen Heffernan	11	8	7	8	Ret	8	6	Ret	6	10	6	5	7	7	10	272
7	(New Zealand) Robert Toshach	9	Ret	DNS	7	8	7	7	14	5				8	9	7	202
8	(New Zealand) Dyson Freeman	4	5	6	6	6	6	9	5	Ret							194
9	(New Zealand) Joseph Oliver	10	11	9	13	15	12	14	9	9	12	8	6	DSQ	WD	WD	177
10	(New Zealand) Jack Noble-Adams				17	11	9	11	11	Ret	13	9	8	10	10	8	175
11	(New Zealand) Andy Downs	13	14	13	19	17	15	17	Ret	11	14	13	10	13	13	14	171
12	(New Zealand) Kim Crocker										5	3	4	4	4	4	169
13	(New Zealand) Anna Collins	8	10	12	12	10	11	10	7	4							162
14	(New Zealand) Roger McKenzie	15	16	Ret	20	18	17	20	12	16	17	15	13	15	14	15	146
15	(New Zealand) Henry Thomas-Kircher				5	5	5	4	4	17							143
16	(New Zealand) Derek Wilson				16	13	DNS	DNS	16	DNS	11	10	9	11	11	12	138
17	(New Zealand) Royce Bayer	6	7	5	10	7	Ret	8	Ret	DNS							130
18	(New Zealand) Nick Buxeda										6	12	11	6	6	5	127
19	(New Zealand) James Dicey	14	12	10	15	14	14	15	15	12							114
20	(New Zealand) Steve Edwards				9	Ret	Ret	13	8	8							71
21	(New Zealand) Stephen Gillard										15	11	Ret	14	15	11	64
22	(New Zealand) Robin Williams	17	15	14				18	17	15							64
23	(New Zealand) Dave McKenzie	12	Ret	15				19	13	13							60
24	(United Kingdom) Trevor Stiles	18	9	8	Ret	DNS	DNS										48
25	(New Zealand) David Silverton										8	5	Ret				46
26	(New Zealand) Simon Spencer-Bower							16	10	10							42
27	(New Zealand) Vic Clarke										16	14	12	12	12	13	41
28	(New Zealand) Graham Dickie				14	12	13										39
29	(New Zealand) Tony Fitzpatrick				18	16	16										28
30	(New Zealand) Paul Dold										7	Ret	DNS	WD	WD	WD	22
31	(New Zealand) David Arrowsmith	16	13	11													0
Pos.	Driver	R1	R2	R3	R1	R2	R3	R1	R2	R3	R1	R2	R3	R1	R2	R3	Points
Pos.	Driver	TIM			RUA			TER			TAU			MAN			Points
