= 2014–15 Toyota Finance 86 Championship =

Seasons
- ← 2013–14 2015–16 →

The 2014–2015 Toyota Finance 86 Championship was the second running of the Toyota Finance 86 Championship. The championship began on 27 September 2014 at Taupo Motorsport Park and ended on 1 March 2015 at Hampton Downs Motorsport Park after eighteen races held at six meetings.

The championship was won by Ken Smith Motor Racing driver Tom Alexander, after a run of six successive wins – four overall wins plus two class wins, behind the non-scoring Nick Cassidy (Neale Motorsport) at Manfeild – at Teretonga, Manfeild and Hampton Downs. Alexander won the championship by 66 points ahead of defending champion Jamie McNee, who won races at Taupō, Pukekohe and Hampton Downs for ETEC Motorsport. Ash Blewett finished in third place in the series, 52 points in arrears of McNee and 118 of Alexander. He won four races over the course of the season, including a double at Pukekohe. The other drivers to win races were Marcus Armstrong, who won races at each of the first three race meetings, Matt Gibson won the opening race at Taupō, en route to fifth in the championship, while Cassidy won a third race at Teretonga, the only round in which he was eligible for championship points.

== Race calendar ==
Round		Circuit	Date	Map
2014				2014–15 Toyota Finance 86 Championship is located in New Zealand
1	R1	Taupo Motorsport Park (Taupō, Waikato)	27 September	2014–15 Toyota Finance 86 Championship is located in New Zealand
1	R2	Taupo Motorsport Park (Taupō, Waikato)	28 September	2014–15 Toyota Finance 86 Championship is located in New Zealand
1	R3	Taupo Motorsport Park (Taupō, Waikato)	28 September	2014–15 Toyota Finance 86 Championship is located in New Zealand
2	R1	Pukekohe Park Raceway (Pukekohe, Auckland Region)	29 November	2014–15 Toyota Finance 86 Championship is located in New Zealand
2	R2	Pukekohe Park Raceway (Pukekohe, Auckland Region)	30 November	2014–15 Toyota Finance 86 Championship is located in New Zealand
2	R3	Pukekohe Park Raceway (Pukekohe, Auckland Region)	30 November	2014–15 Toyota Finance 86 Championship is located in New Zealand
2015				2014–15 Toyota Finance 86 Championship is located in New Zealand
3	R1	Mike Pero Motorsport Park (Christchurch, Canterbury Region)	17 January	2014–15 Toyota Finance 86 Championship is located in New Zealand
3	R2	Mike Pero Motorsport Park (Christchurch, Canterbury Region)	18 January	2014–15 Toyota Finance 86 Championship is located in New Zealand
3	R3	Mike Pero Motorsport Park (Christchurch, Canterbury Region)	18 January	2014–15 Toyota Finance 86 Championship is located in New Zealand
4	R1	Teretonga Park (Invercargill, Southland Region)	24 January	2014–15 Toyota Finance 86 Championship is located in New Zealand
4	R2	Teretonga Park (Invercargill, Southland Region)	25 January	2014–15 Toyota Finance 86 Championship is located in New Zealand
4	R3	Teretonga Park (Invercargill, Southland Region)	25 January	2014–15 Toyota Finance 86 Championship is located in New Zealand
5	R1	Manfeild Autocourse (Feilding, Manawatū District)	14 February	2014–15 Toyota Finance 86 Championship is located in New Zealand
5	R2	Manfeild Autocourse (Feilding, Manawatū District)	15 February	2014–15 Toyota Finance 86 Championship is located in New Zealand
5	R3	Manfeild Autocourse (Feilding, Manawatū District)	15 February	2014–15 Toyota Finance 86 Championship is located in New Zealand
6	R1	Hampton Downs Motorsport Park (Hampton Downs, North Waikato)	28 February	2014–15 Toyota Finance 86 Championship is located in New Zealand
6	R2	Hampton Downs Motorsport Park (Hampton Downs, North Waikato)	1 March	2014–15 Toyota Finance 86 Championship is located in New Zealand
6	R3	Hampton Downs Motorsport Park (Hampton Downs, North Waikato)	1 March	2014–15 Toyota Finance 86 Championship is located in New Zealand

== Teams and drivers ==
All teams were New-Zealand registered.

Team	No.	Driver	Class	Rounds
ETEC Motorsport	1	(New Zealand) Jamie McNee	E	All
ETEC Motorsport	96	(Australia) Luis Leeds		3
Neale Motorsport	002	(New Zealand) Rick Armstrong		3
Neale Motorsport	002	(New Zealand) Nick Cassidy		5
Neale Motorsport	002	(New Zealand) Reid Harker		6
Neale Motorsport	9	(New Zealand) Marcus Armstrong		1–3
Neale Motorsport	9	(New Zealand) Nick Cassidy		4
Neale Motorsport	9	(New Zealand) Rick Armstrong		5
Neil Allport Motorsports	8	(New Zealand) Neil Allport		1–5
Ken Smith Motor Racing	11	(New Zealand) Tom Alexander	E	All
West City Motorsport	15	(New Zealand) Bruce Thomlinson		1–2, 6
West City Motorsport	66	(New Zealand) Ash Blewett	A	All
Richards Team Motorsport	58	(New Zealand) Cory Holmes		1–2
Matt Gibson Motorsport	88	(New Zealand) Matt Gibson	A	All
Quin Motorsport NZ	91	(New Zealand) Callum Quin	A	All

Icon	Class
E	Elite
A	Amateur

== Results and standings ==
=== Season summary ===
All rounds were held in New Zealand. Rounds 3, 4 and 5 were held with the Toyota Racing Series.

Round		Circuit	Pole position	Fastest lap	Winning driver	Winning team	Round winner(s)
2014
1	R1	Taupo Motorsport Park	(New Zealand) Matt Gibson	(New Zealand) Ash Blewett	(New Zealand) Matt Gibson	Matt Gibson Motorsport	(New Zealand) Jamie McNee (New Zealand) Ash Blewett
1	R2	Taupo Motorsport Park		(New Zealand) Matt Gibson	(New Zealand) Jamie McNee	Etec Motorsport	(New Zealand) Jamie McNee (New Zealand) Ash Blewett
1	R3	Taupo Motorsport Park		(New Zealand) Matt Gibson	(New Zealand) Marcus Armstrong	Neale Motorsport	(New Zealand) Jamie McNee (New Zealand) Ash Blewett
2	R1	Pukekohe Park Raceway	(New Zealand) Ash Blewett	(New Zealand) Ash Blewett	(New Zealand) Ash Blewett	West City Motorsport	(New Zealand) Ash Blewett
2	R2	Pukekohe Park Raceway		(New Zealand) Tom Alexander	(New Zealand) Jamie McNee	Etec Motorsport	(New Zealand) Ash Blewett
2	R3	Pukekohe Park Raceway		(New Zealand) Tom Alexander	(New Zealand) Ash Blewett	West City Motorsport	(New Zealand) Ash Blewett
2015
3	R1	Mike Pero Motorsport Park	(New Zealand) Marcus Armstrong	(New Zealand) Tom Alexander	(New Zealand) Marcus Armstrong	Neale Motorsport	(New Zealand) Marcus Armstrong
3	R2	Mike Pero Motorsport Park		(New Zealand) Ash Blewett	(New Zealand) Ash Blewett	West City Motorsport	(New Zealand) Marcus Armstrong
3	R3	Mike Pero Motorsport Park		(New Zealand) Marcus Armstrong	(New Zealand) Marcus Armstrong	Neale Motorsport	(New Zealand) Marcus Armstrong
4	R1	Teretonga Park	(New Zealand) Nick Cassidy	(New Zealand) Tom Alexander	(New Zealand) Nick Cassidy	Neale Motorsport	(New Zealand) Tom Alexander
4	R2	Teretonga Park		(New Zealand) Nick Cassidy	(New Zealand) Tom Alexander	Ken Smith Motor Racing	(New Zealand) Tom Alexander
4	R3	Teretonga Park		(New Zealand) Nick Cassidy	(New Zealand) Tom Alexander	Ken Smith Motor Racing	(New Zealand) Tom Alexander
5	R1	Manfeild Autocourse	(New Zealand) Tom Alexander	(New Zealand) Nick Cassidy	(New Zealand) Nick Cassidy	Neale Motorsport	(New Zealand) Nick Cassidy
5	R2	Manfeild Autocourse		(New Zealand) Tom Alexander	(New Zealand) Nick Cassidy	Neale Motorsport	(New Zealand) Nick Cassidy
5	R3	Manfeild Autocourse		(New Zealand) Nick Cassidy	(New Zealand) Tom Alexander	Ken Smith Motor Racing	(New Zealand) Nick Cassidy
6	R1	Hampton Downs Motorsport Park	(New Zealand) Tom Alexander	(New Zealand) Tom Alexander	(New Zealand) Tom Alexander	Ken Smith Motor Racing	(New Zealand) Jamie McNee
6	R2	Hampton Downs Motorsport Park		(New Zealand) Ash Blewett	(New Zealand) Jamie McNee	ETEC Motorsport	(New Zealand) Jamie McNee
6	R3	Hampton Downs Motorsport Park		(New Zealand) Tom Alexander	(New Zealand) Ash Blewett	West City Motorsport	(New Zealand) Jamie McNee

=== Championship standings ===
In order for a driver to score championship points, they had to complete at least 75% of the race winner's distance, and be running at the finish. All races counted towards the final championship standings.

Scoring system

Position	1st	2nd	3rd	4th	5th	6th	7th	8th	9th
Points	75	67	60	54	49	45	42	39	36

Pos.	Driver	TAU			PUK			RUA			TER			MAN			HAM			Pts
Pos.	Driver	R1	R2	R3	R1	R2	R3	R1	R2	R3	R1	R2	R3	R1	R2	R3	R1	R2	R3	Pts
1	(New Zealand) Tom Alexander (E)	4	5	7	3	2	2	2	3	2	2	1	1	**2**	2	1	**1**	2	6	1162
2	(New Zealand) Jamie McNee (E)	2	1	6	2	1	4	3	4	3	4	2	4	5	5	5	2	1	3	1096
3	(New Zealand) Ash Blewett (A)	3	3	2	**1**	3	1	4	1	DNS	5	6	3	4	4	3	7	3	1	1044
4	(New Zealand) Callum Quin (A)	5	4	3	5	6	6	9	5	Ret	6	4	5	3	3	4	3	4	2	910
5	(New Zealand) Matt Gibson (A)	**1**	2	Ret	8	7	5	5	6	4	3	7	6	6	6	6	5	6	5	857
6	(New Zealand) Neil Allport	7	7	5	7	9	8	7	Ret	6	7	5	7	8	8	8				596
7	(New Zealand) Marcus Armstrong	9	6	1	DNS	5	3	**1**	2	1										482
8	(New Zealand) Bruce Thomlinson	8	9	4	6	8	9										6	7	7	378
9	(New Zealand) Rick Armstrong							6	8	7				7	7	7				261
10	(New Zealand) Cory Holmes	6	8	Ret	4	4	7													234
11	(New Zealand) Nick Cassidy										**1**	3	2	1	1	2				202
12	(New Zealand) Reid Harker																4	5	4	157
13	(Australia) Luis Leeds							8	7	5										130
Pos.	Driver	R1	R2	R3	R1	R2	R3	R1	R2	R3	R1	R2	R3	R1	R2	R3	R1	R2	R3	Pts
Pos.	Driver	TAU			PUK			RUA			TER			MAN			HAM			Pts

Colour	Result
Gold	Winner
Silver	Second place
Bronze	Third place
Green	Points classification
Blue	Non-points classification
Blue	Non-classified finish (NC)
Purple	Retired, not classified (Ret)
Red	Did not qualify (DNQ)
Red	Did not pre-qualify (DNPQ)
Black	Disqualified (DSQ)
White	Did not start (DNS)
White	Withdrew (WD)
White	Race cancelled (C)
Blank	Did not practice (DNP)
Blank	Did not arrive (DNA)
Blank	Excluded (EX)

**Bold** – Pole
Italics – Fastest Lap
(E) – Elite
(A) – Amateur
