= 2026 24 Hours of Daytona =

Endurance sports car race in Florida, US

| Previous: 2025 | Next: 2027 |
Index: Races | Winners

Map of the Daytona International Speedway combined road course

The 2026 24 Hours of Daytona was the 64th Daytona 24 hours endurance sports car race sanctioned by International Motor Sports Association (IMSA), taking place from January 24–25, 2026, at the Daytona International Speedway combined road course in Daytona Beach, Florida. The race was the opening round of the 2026 IMSA SportsCar Championship season. The overall winner and winner of the GTP class was the #7 Penske Porsche, by 1.5 seconds over the #31 Whelen Cadillac. This was both Penske Porsche’s and driver Felipe Nasr’s third consecutive overall win in the Rolex 24. The LMP2 class was won by the #04 CrowdStrike ORECA. The GTD Pro class was won by the #1 Paul Miller Racing BMW. The GTD class was won by the #57 Winward Racing Mercedes.

== Background ==
=== Preview ===
Daytona International Speedway, where the race will be held

NASCAR founder Bill France Sr., who built Daytona International Speedway in 1959, conceived the 24 Hours of Daytona to attract European sports-car endurance racing to the United States and provide international exposure to the speedway. It is informally considered part of the Triple Crown of Endurance Racing, with the 12 Hours of Sebring and the 24 Hours of Le Mans.

International Motor Sports Association (IMSA) president John Doonan confirmed the race was a part of the 2026 IMSA SportsCar Championship (IMSA SCC) in March 2025. It will be the thirteenth consecutive year it was a part of the IMSA SCC, and the 64th 24 Hours of Daytona. The 24 Hours of Daytona is the first of eleven scheduled sports car endurance races by IMSA, and the first of five races of the Michelin Endurance Cup (MEC). The race will take place at the 12-turn 3.560-mile (5.729 km) Daytona International Speedway in Daytona Beach, Florida from January 24 to 25.

== Entry list ==
| No. | Entrant | Car | Driver 1 | Driver 2 | Driver 3 | Driver 4 |
GTP (Grand Touring Prototype) (11 entries)
| 6 | (Germany) Porsche Penske Motorsport | Porsche 963 | (Australia) Matt Campbell | (France) Kévin Estre | (Belgium) Laurens Vanthoor | |
| 7 | (Germany) Porsche Penske Motorsport | Porsche 963 | (France) Julien Andlauer | (Germany) Laurin Heinrich | (Brazil) Felipe Nasr | |
| 10 | (United States) Cadillac Wayne Taylor Racing | Cadillac V-Series.R | (Portugal) Filipe Albuquerque | (United Kingdom) Will Stevens | (United States) Ricky Taylor | |
| 23 | (United States) Aston Martin THOR Team | Aston Martin Valkyrie | (Canada) Roman De Angelis | (United Kingdom) Ross Gunn | (Spain) Alex Riberas | (Denmark) Marco Sørensen |
| 24 | (Belgium) BMW M Team WRT | BMW M Hybrid V8 | (Netherlands) Robin Frijns | (Germany) René Rast | (South Africa) Sheldon van der Linde | (Belgium) Dries Vanthoor |
| 25 | (Belgium) BMW M Team WRT | BMW M Hybrid V8 | (Austria) Philipp Eng | (Denmark) Kevin Magnussen | (Switzerland) Raffaele Marciello | (Germany) Marco Wittmann |
| 31 | (United States) Cadillac Whelen | Cadillac V-Series.R | (United Kingdom) Jack Aitken | (New Zealand) Earl Bamber | (Denmark) Frederik Vesti | (United States) Connor Zilisch |
| 40 | (United States) Cadillac Wayne Taylor Racing | Cadillac V-Series.R | (Switzerland) Louis Delétraz | (United States) Colton Herta | (United States) Jordan Taylor | |
| 60 | (United States) Acura Meyer Shank Racing with Curb-Agajanian | Acura ARX-06 | (United States) A. J. Allmendinger | (United Kingdom) Tom Blomqvist | (United States) Colin Braun | (New Zealand) Scott Dixon |
| 85 | (United States) JDC–Miller MotorSports | Porsche 963 | (United States) Kaylen Frederick | (Netherlands) Tijmen van der Helm | (Chile) Nico Pino | |
| 93 | (United States) Acura Meyer Shank Racing with Curb-Agajanian | Acura ARX-06 | (Japan) Kakunoshin Ohta | (Spain) Álex Palou | (United Kingdom) Nick Yelloly | (Netherlands) Renger van der Zande |
LMP2 (Le Mans Prototype 2) (13 entries)
| 04 | (Portugal) CrowdStrike Racing by APR | Oreca 07-Gibson | (Denmark) Malthe Jakobsen | (United States) George Kurtz | (United Kingdom) Alex Quinn | (United Kingdom) Toby Sowery |
| 2 | (United States) United Autosports USA | Oreca 07-Gibson | (Canada) Phil Fayer | (United Kingdom) Ben Hanley | (Denmark) Mikkel Jensen | (New Zealand) Hunter McElrea |
| 8 | (Canada) Tower Motorsports | Oreca 07-Gibson | (Mexico) Sebastián Álvarez | (France) Sébastien Bourdais | (Canada) John Farano | (Cayman Islands) Kyffin Simpson |
| 11 | (France) TDS Racing | Oreca 07-Gibson | (Switzerland) Mathias Beche | (Denmark) David Heinemeier Hansson | (Canada) Tobias Lütke | (France) Charles Milesi |
| 18 | (United States) Era Motorsport | Oreca 07-Gibson | (United States) Jacob Abel | (Austria) Ferdinand Habsburg | (United States) Naveen Rao | (United States) Logan Sargeant |
| 22 | (United States) United Autosports USA | Oreca 07-Gibson | (United Kingdom) Paul di Resta | (United States) Dan Goldburg | (Sweden) Rasmus Lindh | (Switzerland) Grégoire Saucy |
| 37 | (United States) Intersport Racing | Oreca 07-Gibson | (United States) Jon Field | (United Kingdom) Oliver Jarvis | (United States) Seth Lucas | (Netherlands) Job van Uitert |
| 43 | (Poland) Inter Europol Competition | Oreca 07-Gibson | (United States) Jeremy Clarke | (France) Tom Dillmann | (Portugal) António Félix da Costa | (United States) Bijoy Garg |
| 52 | (United States) Bryan Herta Autosport with PR1/Mathiasen | Oreca 07-Gibson | (Canada) Misha Goikhberg | (United States) Ben Keating | (Canada) Parker Thompson | (United Kingdom) Harry Tincknell |
| 73 | (United States) Pratt Miller Motorsports | Oreca 07-Gibson | (Canada) Chris Cumming | (Portugal) Manuel Espírito Santo | (Brazil) Enzo Fittipaldi | (Brazil) Pietro Fittipaldi |
| 83 | (Italy) AF Corse USA | Oreca 07-Gibson | (United States) Dylan Murry | (Denmark) Nicklas Nielsen | (France) François Perrodo | (France) Matthieu Vaxivière |
| 99 | (United States) AO Racing | Oreca 07-Gibson | (United States) Dane Cameron | (United Kingdom) Jonny Edgar | (United States) P. J. Hyett | (Denmark) Christian Rasmussen |
| 343 | (Poland) Inter Europol Competition | Oreca 07-Gibson | (New Zealand) Nick Cassidy | (Greece) Georgios Kolovos | (United States) Nolan Siegel | (Poland) Jakub Śmiechowski |
GTD Pro (GT Daytona Pro) (15 entries)
| 033 | (United States) Triarsi Competizione | Ferrari 296 GT3 Evo | (Italy) Riccardo Agostini | (United Kingdom) James Calado | (Spain) Miguel Molina | (Italy) Alessio Rovera |
| 1 | (United States) Paul Miller Racing | BMW M4 GT3 Evo | (United States) Connor De Phillippi | (United Kingdom) Dan Harper | (Germany) Max Hesse | (United States) Neil Verhagen |
| 3 | (United States) Corvette Racing by Pratt Miller Motorsports | Chevrolet Corvette Z06 GT3.R | (Spain) Antonio García | (Germany) Marvin Kirchhöfer | (United Kingdom) Alexander Sims | |
| 4 | (United States) Corvette Racing by Pratt Miller Motorsports | Chevrolet Corvette Z06 GT3.R | (Netherlands) Nicky Catsburg | (United States) Tommy Milner | (Argentina) Nico Varrone | |
| 9 | (Canada) Pfaff Motorsports | Lamborghini Huracán GT3 Evo 2 | (Italy) Mirko Bortolotti | (Italy) Andrea Caldarelli | (Canada) James Hinchcliffe | (United Kingdom) Sandy Mitchell |
| 14 | (United States) Vasser Sullivan Racing | Lexus RC F GT3 | (United Kingdom) Ben Barnicoat | (United Kingdom) Jack Hawksworth | (United States) Kyle Kirkwood | |
| 48 | (United States) Winward Racing | Mercedes-AMG GT3 Evo | (United States) Jason Hart | (Belgium) Maxime Martin | (United States) Scott Noble | (Germany) Luca Stolz |
| 59 | (United States) RLL Team McLaren | McLaren 720S GT3 Evo | (United States) Max Esterson | (United States) Nikita Johnson | (United Kingdom) Dean MacDonald | (Estonia) Jüri Vips |
| 62 | (United States) Risi Competizione | Ferrari 296 GT3 Evo | (Italy) Alessandro Pier Guidi | (Italy) Davide Rigon | (Brazil) Daniel Serra | |
| 64 | (Canada) Ford Multimatic Motorsports | Ford Mustang GT3 Evo | (United Kingdom) Ben Barker | (Norway) Dennis Olsen | (Germany) Mike Rockenfeller | |
| 65 | (Canada) Ford Multimatic Motorsports | Ford Mustang GT3 Evo | (Germany) Christopher Mies | (United Kingdom) Sebastian Priaulx | (Belgium) Frédéric Vervisch | |
| 69 | (Germany) Bartone Bros with GetSpeed | Mercedes-AMG GT3 Evo | (United States) Anthony Bartone | (Germany) Maximilian Götz | (Andorra) Jules Gounon | (Germany) Fabian Schiller |
| 75 | (Australia) 75 Express | Mercedes-AMG GT3 Evo | (Germany) Maro Engel | (Australia) Kenny Habul | (Australia) Chaz Mostert | (Australia) Will Power |
| 77 | (United States) AO Racing | Porsche 911 GT3 R (992.2) | (United Kingdom) Harry King | (Belgium) Alessio Picariello | (United Kingdom) Nick Tandy | |
| 911 | (Germany) Manthey Racing | Porsche 911 GT3 R (992.2) | (Austria) Klaus Bachler | (Switzerland) Ricardo Feller | (Turkey) Ayhancan Güven | (Austria) Thomas Preining |
GTD (GT Daytona) (21 entries)
| 023 | (United States) Triarsi Competizione | Ferrari 296 GT3 Evo | (United States) Kenton Koch | (United States) Robert Megennis | (United States) Onofrio Triarsi | (China) Yifei Ye |
| 12 | (United States) Vasser Sullivan Racing | Lexus RC F GT3 | (France) Esteban Masson | (United States) Frankie Montecalvo | (Denmark) Benjamin Pedersen | (United States) Aaron Telitz |
| 13 | (Canada) 13 Autosport | Chevrolet Corvette Z06 GT3.R | (United Kingdom) Matt Bell | (Canada) Orey Fidani | (United Kingdom) Ben Green | (Germany) Lars Kern |
| 16 | (United States) Myers Riley Motorsports | Ford Mustang GT3 Evo | (United States) Jenson Altzman | (Brazil) Felipe Fraga | (France) Romain Grosjean | (United States) Sheena Monk |
| 19 | (United States) van der Steur Racing | Aston Martin Vantage AMR GT3 Evo | (France) Sébastien Baud | (Thailand) Carl Bennett | (France) Valentin Hasse-Clot | (United States) Rory van der Steur |
| 21 | (Italy) AF Corse USA | Ferrari 296 GT3 Evo | (Italy) Antonio Fuoco | (United Kingdom) Simon Mann | (Italy) Tommaso Mosca | (France) Lilou Wadoux |
| 27 | (United States) Heart of Racing Team | Aston Martin Vantage AMR GT3 Evo | (Brazil) Eduardo Barrichello | (Italy) Mattia Drudi | (United Kingdom) Tom Gamble | (Canada) Zacharie Robichon |
| 28 | (United States) RS1 | Porsche 911 GT3 R (992.2) | (Belgium) Jan Heylen | (United States) Dillon Machavern | (Germany) Sven Müller | (United States) Eric Zitza |
| 34 | (United States) Conquest Racing | Ferrari 296 GT3 Evo | (Spain) Albert Costa | (United States) Manny Franco | (Italy) Lorenzo Patrese | (Netherlands) Thierry Vermeulen |
| 36 | (United States) DXDT Racing | Chevrolet Corvette Z06 GT3.R | (Republic of Ireland) Charlie Eastwood | (United States) Mason Filippi | (New Zealand) Scott McLaughlin | (Turkey) Salih Yoluç |
| 44 | (United States) Magnus Racing | Aston Martin Vantage AMR GT3 Evo | (United States) John Potter | (United States) Spencer Pumpelly | (United States) Madison Snow | (Denmark) Nicki Thiim |
| 45 | (United States) Wayne Taylor Racing | Lamborghini Huracán GT3 Evo 2 | (United States) Graham Doyle | (Sweden) Marcus Ericsson | (Costa Rica) Danny Formal | (United States) Trent Hindman |
| 57 | (United States) Winward Racing | Mercedes-AMG GT3 Evo | (Austria) Lucas Auer | (Netherlands) Indy Dontje | (Switzerland) Philip Ellis | (United States) Russell Ward |
| 66 | (United States) Gradient Racing | Ford Mustang GT3 Evo | (United Kingdom) Till Bechtolsheimer | (United States) Joey Hand | (United States) Corey Lewis | (United States) Jake Walker |
| 70 | (United Kingdom) Inception Racing | Ferrari 296 GT3 Evo | (Italy) David Fumanelli | (United States) Brendan Iribe | (United Kingdom) Ollie Millroy | (Denmark) Frederik Schandorff |
| 80 | (United States) Lone Star Racing | Mercedes-AMG GT3 Evo | (Australia) Scott Andrews | (Estonia) Ralf Aron | (Netherlands) Lin Hodenius | (Republic of Ireland) James Roe |
| 81 | (United States) DragonSpeed | Chevrolet Corvette Z06 GT3.R | (Italy) Giacomo Altoè | (Italy) Matteo Cairoli | (Sweden) Henrik Hedman | (United Kingdom) Casper Stevenson |
| 96 | (United States) Turner Motorsport | BMW M4 GT3 Evo | (United States) Robby Foley | (United States) Patrick Gallagher | (Germany) Jens Klingmann | (United States) Francis Selldorff |
| 120 | (United States) Wright Motorsports | Porsche 911 GT3 R (992.2) | (United States) Adam Adelson | (United Kingdom) Callum Ilott | (Australia) Tom Sargent | (United States) Elliott Skeer |
| 123 | (Belgium) Mühlner Motorsport | Porsche 911 GT3 R (992.2) | (United States) Peter Ludwig | (United States) Dave Musial | (United States) Dave Musial Jr. | (New Zealand) Ryan Yardley |
| 912 | (Germany) Manthey 1st Phorm | Porsche 911 GT3 R (992.2) | (United States) Ryan Hardwick | (Italy) Riccardo Pera | (Austria) Richard Lietz | (Netherlands) Morris Schuring |

== Testing ==
The Roar Before the 24 Tests occurred from January 16 to 18, 2026, with all cars participating in the test. The first session on Friday morning saw Felipe Nasr top the times in the No. 7 PPM Porsche 963 with a time of 1:36.327, 0.004 seconds faster than Nico Pino's No. 85 JDC Porsche. Charles Milesi's No. 11 TDS Racing car topped LMP2 with a 1-minute, 38.935 second lap. Dean MacDonald was fastest in GTD Pro while Spencer Pumpelly set the fastest time amongst all GTD cars. The second session on Friday afternoon saw BMW move to the top when Sheldon van der Linde, driving the No. 24 car for BMW M Team WRT, turned a 1:36.742 lap. van der Helm's JDC Porsche was second and Laurin Heinrich was third for Porsche Penske Motorsport. Ben Hanley led LMP2 with a time of 1:39.136, ahead of Enzo Fittipaldi's No. 73 Pratt Miller car and Tom Dillmann's No. 43 Inter Europol entry. Mercedes-AMG led GTD Pro with Chaz Mostert's lap of 1 minute, 47.625 seconds, followed by Christopher Mies' No. 65 Ford and Alexander Sims' No. 3 Corvette. Corey Lewis' No. 66 Ford led GTD from Danny Formal's WTR Lamborghini.

Laurens Vanthoor set the fastest lap (1:36.549) on the second day; Filipe Albuquerque's No. 10 WTR Cadillac was second and Heinrich's No. 7 Porsche was third. Mikkel Jensen led in LMP2, at 1:39.770 driving United Autosport's No. 2 car. Power's No. 75 Mercedes-AMG led in GTD Pro with a 1:47.612 lap during the morning session while Romain Grosjean's No. 16 Ford set the fastest time amongst all GTD cars.

Pino's No. 85 JDC Porsche set the fastest time on the final day of testing with a 1-minute, 37.099 seconds lap. Estre was second fastest in the No. 6 Penske ahead of teammate Nasr in the sister No.7 Porsche. Hanley topped LMP2 for United Autosports with a 1-minute 40.1010 seconds lap. Habul's No. 75 Mercedes-AMG topped GTD Pro while Joey Hand's No. 66 Ford led GTD.

== Practice ==
There were three practice sessions scheduled preceding the start of the race on Saturday, two on Thursday and one on Friday. The first 90-minute session was on Thursday morning while the second session on Thursday night ran for 90 minutes. The third on Friday morning lasted 75 minutes.

== Qualifying ==
Thursday's afternoon qualifying was broken into four sessions, with one session for the GTP, LMP2, GTD Pro, and GTD classes each. The rules dictated that all teams nominated a driver to qualify their cars, with the Pro-Am LMP2 class requiring a Bronze rated driver to qualify the car. The competitors' fastest lap times determined the starting order. IMSA then arranged the grid to put GTPs ahead of the LMP2, GTD Pro, and GTD cars.

The No. 31 Whelen Cadillac was the fastest car in the qualifying session. However, the car failed post-qualifying technical inspection and was moved to the rear of the GTP grid. As a result, the No. 93 Meyer Shank Racing Acura was promoted to pole position and would start first for the race.

=== Qualifying results ===
Pole positions in each class are indicated in bold and with ‡.

| Pos. | Class | No. | Entry | Driver | Time | Gap | Grid |
|---|---|---|---|---|---|---|---|
| 1 | **GTP** | **93** | **(United States) Acura Meyer Shank Racing with Curb-Agajanian** | **(Netherlands) Renger van der Zande** | **1:34.041** | — | 1‡ |
| 2 | GTP | 40 | (United States) Cadillac Wayne Taylor Racing | (Switzerland) Louis Delétraz | 01:34.069 | +0.028 | 2 |
| 3 | GTP | 7 | (Germany) Porsche Penske Motorsport | (Brazil) Felipe Nasr | 01:34.183 | +0.142 | 3 |
| 4 | GTP | 60 | (United States) Acura Meyer Shank Racing with Curb-Agajanian | (United Kingdom) Tom Blomqvist | 01:34.235 | +0.194 | 4 |
| 5 | GTP | 6 | (Germany) Porsche Penske Motorsport | (France) Kévin Estre | 1:34.395 | +0.354 | 5 |
| 6 | GTP | 10 | (United States) Cadillac Wayne Taylor Racing | (Portugal) Filipe Albuquerque | 01:34.513 | +0.472 | 6 |
| 7 | GTP | 85 | (United States) JDC–Miller MotorSports | (Chile) Nico Pino | 01:34.617 | +0.576 | 7 |
| 8 | GTP | 24 | (Belgium) BMW M Team WRT | (Belgium) Dries Vanthoor | 01:34.892 | +0.851 | 8 |
| 9 | GTP | 25 | (Belgium) BMW M Team WRT | (Germany) Marco Wittmann | 01:35.347 | +1.306 | 9 |
| 10 | GTP | 23 | (United States) Aston Martin THOR Team | (United Kingdom) Ross Gunn | 01:35.382 | +1.341 | 10 |
| 11 | **LMP2** | **43** | **(Poland) Inter Europol Competition** | **(United States) Jeremy Clarke** | **01:39.952** | **+5.911** | 12‡ |
| 12 | LMP2 | 99 | (United States) AO Racing | (United States) P. J. Hyett | 01:39.960 | +5.919 | 13 |
| 13 | LMP2 | 22 | (United States) United Autosports USA | (United States) Dan Goldburg | 01:40.096 | +6.055 | 14 |
| 14 | LMP2 | 52 | (United States) Bryan Herta Autosport with PR1/Mathiasen | (United States) Ben Keating | 01:40.542 | +6.501 | 15 |
| 15 | LMP2 | 11 | (France) TDS Racing | (Canada) Tobias Lütke | 01:40.628 | +6.587 | 16 |
| 16 | LMP2 | 04 | (Portugal) CrowdStrike Racing by APR | (United States) George Kurtz | 01:40.834 | +6.793 | 17 |
| 17 | LMP2 | 343 | (Poland) Inter Europol Competition | (Greece) Georgios Kolovos | 01:40.987 | +6.946 | 18 |
| 18 | LMP2 | 18 | (United States) Era Motorsport | (United States) Naveen Rao | 01:41.021 | +6.980 | 19 |
| 19 | LMP2 | 73 | (United States) Pratt Miller Motorsports | (Canada) Chris Cumming | 01:41.185 | +7.144 | 20 |
| 20 | LMP2 | 2 | (United States) United Autosports USA | (Canada) Phil Fayer | 01:41.279 | +7.688 | 21 |
| 21 | LMP2 | 8 | (Canada) Tower Motorsports | (Canada) John Farano | 01:41.563 | +7.522 | 22 |
| 22 | LMP2 | 83 | (Italy) AF Corse USA | (France) François Perrodo | 01:41.576 | +7.535 | 23 |
| 23 | LMP2 | 37 | (United States) Intersport Racing | (United States) Jon Field | 01:42.131 | +8.090 | 24 |
| 24 | **GTD Pro** | **3** | **(United States) Corvette Racing by Pratt Miller Motorsports** | **(United Kingdom) Alexander Sims** | **01:45.106** | **+11.065** | 25‡ |
| 25 | **GTD** | **27** | **(United States) Heart of Racing Team** | **(Canada) Zacharie Robichon** | **01:45.113** | **+11.072** | 40‡ |
| 26 | GTD | 57 | (United States) Winward Racing | (Switzerland) Philip Ellis | 01:45.187 | +11.146 | 41 |
| 27 | GTD | 96 | (United States) Turner Motorsport | (United States) Robby Foley | 01:45.265 | +11.224 | 42 |
| 28 | GTD | 36 | (United States) DXDT Racing | (Republic of Ireland) Charlie Eastwood | 01:45.274 | +11.233 | 43 |
| 29 | GTD | 19 | (United States) van der Steur Racing | (France) Valentin Hasse-Clot | 01:45.381 | +11.340 | 44 |
| 30 | GTD Pro | 59 | (United States) RLL Team McLaren | (United Kingdom) Dean MacDonald | 01:45.425 | +11.384 | 26 |
| 31 | GTD Pro | 75 | (Australia) 75 Express | (Germany) Maro Engel | 01:45.448 | +11.407 | 27 |
| 32 | GTD Pro | 033 | (United States) Triarsi Competizione | (Italy) Alessio Rovera | 01:45.506 | +11.465 | 28 |
| 33 | GTD | 21 | (Italy) AF Corse USA | (Italy) Antonio Fuoco | 01:45.527 | +11.483 | 45 |
| 34 | GTD | 81 | (United States) DragonSpeed | (Italy) Giacomo Altoè | 01:45.539 | +11.498 | 46 |
| 35 | GTD Pro | 65 | (Canada) Ford Multimatic Motorsports | (Belgium) Frédéric Vervisch | 01:45.595 | +11.554 | 29 |
| 36 | GTD | 80 | (United States) Lone Star Racing | (Australia) Scott Andrews | 01:45.620 | +11.579 | 47 |
| 37 | GTD Pro | 69 | (Germany) Bartone Bros with GetSpeed | (Germany) Maximilian Götz | 01:45.633 | +11.592 | 30 |
| 38 | GTD Pro | 4 | (United States) Corvette Racing by Pratt Miller Motorsports | (Netherlands) Nicky Catsburg | 01:45.656 | +11.615 | 31 |
| 39 | GTD Pro | 62 | (United States) Risi Competizione | (Italy) Davide Rigon | 01:45.662 | +11.621 | 32 |
| 40 | GTD Pro | 48 | (United States) Winward Racing | (Germany) Luca Stolz | 01:45.693 | +11.652 | 33 |
| 41 | GTD | 70 | (United Kingdom) Inception Racing | (Denmark) Frederik Schandorff | 01:45.837 | +11.796 | 48 |
| 42 | GTD Pro | 9 | (Canada) Pfaff Motorsports | (United Kingdom) Sandy Mitchell | 01:45.959 | +11.918 | 34 |
| 43 | GTD | 120 | (United States) Wright Motorsports | (United States) Elliott Skeer | 01:45.997 | +11.956 | 49 |
| 44 | GTD Pro | 14 | (United States) Vasser Sullivan Racing | (United Kingdom) Jack Hawksworth | 01:46.029 | +11.988 | 35 |
| 45 | GTD Pro | 64 | (Canada) Ford Multimatic Motorsports | (Norway) Dennis Olsen | 01:46.029 | +11.988 | 36 |
| 46 | GTD Pro | 911 | (Germany) Manthey Racing | (Switzerland) Ricardo Feller | 01:46.034 | +11.993 | 37 |
| 47 | GTD Pro | 77 | (United States) AO Racing | (United Kingdom) Nick Tandy | 01:46.242 | +12.201 | 38 |
| 48 | GTD | 023 | (United States) Triarsi Competizione | (United States) Kenton Koch | 01:46.290 | +12.249 | 50 |
| 49 | GTD | 45 | (United States) Wayne Taylor Racing | (United States) Trent Hindman | 01:46.292 | +12.251 | 51 |
| 50 | GTD | 34 | (United States) Conquest Racing | (United States) Manny Franco | 01:46.556 | +12.515 | 52 |
| 51 | GTD | 12 | (United States) Vasser Sullivan Racing | (Denmark) Benjamin Pedersen | 01:46.636 | +12.595 | 53 |
| 52 | GTD | 44 | (United States) Magnus Racing | (United States) John Potter | 01:46.851 | +12.810 | 54 |
| 53 | GTD | 13 | (Canada) 13 Autosport | (Canada) Orey Fidani | 01:47.051 | +13.010 | 55 |
| 54 | GTD | 66 | (United States) Gradient Racing | (United Kingdom) Till Bechtolsheimer | 01:47.121 | +13.080 | 56 |
| 55 | GTD | 912 | (Germany) Manthey 1st Phorm | (United States) Ryan Hardwick | 01:47.414 | +13.373 | 57 |
| 56 | GTD | 123 | (Belgium) Mühlner Motorsport | (United States) Peter Ludwig | 1:47.682 | +13.641 | 58 |
| 57 | GTD | 28 | (United States) RS1 | (United States) Eric Zitza | 1:47.686 | +13.645 | 59 |
| 58 | GTD | 16 | (United States) Myers Riley Motorsports | (United States) Sheena Monk | 1:48.220 | +14.179 | 60 |
| 59 | GTP | 31 | (United States) Cadillac Whelen | (United Kingdom) Jack Aitken | Time disallowed^{1} | | 11 |
| 60 | GTD Pro | 1 | (United States) Paul Miller Racing | (United States) Neil Verhagen | Time disallowed^{2} | | 39 |

- ^{1} The No. 31 Cadillac Whelen entry had all qualifying times disallowed and was moved to the rear of the GTP field after failing post-qualifying technical inspection regarding rules for skid block tolerances.
- ^{2} The No. 1 Paul Miller Racing entry had all qualifying times disallowed and was moved to the rear of the GTD Pro field after failing post-qualifying technical inspection regarding rules for tire camber.

== Race ==
=== Start and early hours ===
Entering turn 1 immediately after the start, there was a four car crash in the LMP2 class. Two of those cars collided again in the runoff while trying to return to the track.

=== Night ===
At 12:46 am local time the yellow flag was waved due to low visibility caused by fog. The yellow flag would continue for six hours, thirty three minutes and twenty five seconds. The green flag was waved at 7:19 am local time, restarting the race.

== Post-race ==
Since it was the season's first race, Andlauer, Heinrich, and Nasr led the GTP Drivers' Championship with 380 points, ahead of Aitken, Bamber, Vesti, and Zilisch by 40 points. Jakobsen, Kurtz, Quinn, and Sowery led the LMP2 point standings, ahead of Clarke, Dillmann, Félix da Costa, and Garg. De Phillippi, Harper, Hesse, and Verhagen held the GTD Pro Drivers' Championship lead over Engel, Habul, Mostert, and Power. In GTD, Auer, Dontje, Philip Ellis, and Ward led the class points standings over Potter, Pumpelly, Snow, and Thiim. Porsche Penske, Crowdstrike Racing by APR, Paul Miller Racing and Winward Racing became the leaders of their respective Teams' Championships. Porsche, BMW, and Mercedes-AMG assumed the lead of their respective Manufacturers' Championships with 10 rounds remaining in the season.

== Results ==
Class winners denoted in bold and with ‡

| Pos | Class | PIC | No. | Team / Entrant | Drivers | Chassis | Laps | Time/Retired |
| Pos | Class | PIC | No. | Team / Entrant | Drivers | Engine | Laps | Time/Retired |
|---|---|---|---|---|---|---|---|---|
| 1 | **GTP** | **1** | **7** | **(Germany) Porsche Penske Motorsport** | **(France) Julien Andlauer (Germany) Laurin Heinrich (Brazil) Felipe Nasr** | **Porsche 963** | **705** | **24:01:20.108‡** |
| 1 | **GTP** | **1** | **7** | **(Germany) Porsche Penske Motorsport** | **(France) Julien Andlauer (Germany) Laurin Heinrich (Brazil) Felipe Nasr** | **Porsche 9RD 4.6 L Turbo V8** | **705** | **24:01:20.108‡** |
| 2 | GTP | 2 | 31 | (United States) Cadillac Whelen | (United Kingdom) Jack Aitken (New Zealand) Earl Bamber (Denmark) Frederik Vesti (United States) Connor Zilisch | Cadillac V-Series.R | 705 | +1.569 |
| 2 | GTP | 2 | 31 | (United States) Cadillac Whelen | (United Kingdom) Jack Aitken (New Zealand) Earl Bamber (Denmark) Frederik Vesti (United States) Connor Zilisch | Cadillac LMC55R 5.5 L V8 | 705 | +1.569 |
| 3 | GTP | 3 | 24 | (Belgium) BMW M Team WRT | (Netherlands) Robin Frijns (Germany) René Rast (South Africa) Sheldon van der Linde (Belgium) Dries Vanthoor | BMW M Hybrid V8 | 705 | +21.386 |
| 3 | GTP | 3 | 24 | (Belgium) BMW M Team WRT | (Netherlands) Robin Frijns (Germany) René Rast (South Africa) Sheldon van der Linde (Belgium) Dries Vanthoor | BMW P66/3 4.0 L Turbo V8 | 705 | +21.386 |
| 4 | GTP | 4 | 6 | (Germany) Porsche Penske Motorsport | (Australia) Matt Campbell (France) Kévin Estre (Belgium) Laurens Vanthoor | Porsche 963 | 705 | +31.822 |
| 4 | GTP | 4 | 6 | (Germany) Porsche Penske Motorsport | (Australia) Matt Campbell (France) Kévin Estre (Belgium) Laurens Vanthoor | Porsche 9RD 4.6 L Turbo V8 | 705 | +31.822 |
| 5 | GTP | 5 | 93 | (United States) Meyer Shank Racing with Curb-Agajanian | (Japan) Kakunoshin Ohta (Spain) Álex Palou (United Kingdom) Nick Yelloly (Netherlands) Renger van der Zande | Acura ARX-06 | 705 | +45.677 |
| 5 | GTP | 5 | 93 | (United States) Meyer Shank Racing with Curb-Agajanian | (Japan) Kakunoshin Ohta (Spain) Álex Palou (United Kingdom) Nick Yelloly (Netherlands) Renger van der Zande | Acura AR24e 2.4 L Turbo V6 | 705 | +45.677 |
| 6 | GTP | 6 | 40 | (United States) Cadillac Wayne Taylor Racing | (Switzerland) Louis Delétraz (United States) Colton Herta (United States) Jordan Taylor | Cadillac V-Series.R | 705 | +54.017 |
| 6 | GTP | 6 | 40 | (United States) Cadillac Wayne Taylor Racing | (Switzerland) Louis Delétraz (United States) Colton Herta (United States) Jordan Taylor | Cadillac LMC55R 5.5 L V8 | 705 | +54.017 |
| 7 | GTP | 7 | 85 | (United States) JDC-Miller MotorSports | (United States) Kaylen Frederick (Netherlands) Tijmen van der Helm (Chile) Nico Pino | Porsche 963 | 705 | +1:10.736 |
| 7 | GTP | 7 | 85 | (United States) JDC-Miller MotorSports | (United States) Kaylen Frederick (Netherlands) Tijmen van der Helm (Chile) Nico Pino | Porsche 9RD 4.6 L Turbo V8 | 705 | +1:10.736 |
| 8 | GTP | 8 | 25 | (Belgium) BMW M Team WRT | (Austria) Philipp Eng (Denmark) Kevin Magnussen (Switzerland) Raffaele Marciello (Germany) Marco Wittmann | BMW M Hybrid V8 | 705 | +1:13.443 |
| 8 | GTP | 8 | 25 | (Belgium) BMW M Team WRT | (Austria) Philipp Eng (Denmark) Kevin Magnussen (Switzerland) Raffaele Marciello (Germany) Marco Wittmann | BMW P66/3 4.0 L Turbo V8 | 705 | +1:13.443 |
| 9 | GTP | 9 | 60 | (United States) Meyer Shank Racing with Curb-Agajanian | (United States) A. J. Allmendinger (United Kingdom) Tom Blomqvist (United States) Colin Braun (New Zealand) Scott Dixon | Acura ARX-06 | 705 | +1:22.563 |
| 9 | GTP | 9 | 60 | (United States) Meyer Shank Racing with Curb-Agajanian | (United States) A. J. Allmendinger (United Kingdom) Tom Blomqvist (United States) Colin Braun (New Zealand) Scott Dixon | Acura AR24e 2.4 L Turbo V6 | 705 | +1:22.563 |
| 10 | **LMP2** | **1** | **04** | **(Portugal) Crowdstrike Racing by APR** | **(Denmark) Malthe Jakobsen (United States) George Kurtz (United Kingdom) Alex Quinn (United Kingdom) Toby Sowery** | **Oreca 07** | **686** | **+19 Laps‡** |
| 10 | **LMP2** | **1** | **04** | **(Portugal) Crowdstrike Racing by APR** | **(Denmark) Malthe Jakobsen (United States) George Kurtz (United Kingdom) Alex Quinn (United Kingdom) Toby Sowery** | **Gibson GK428 4.2 L V8** | **686** | **+19 Laps‡** |
| 11 | LMP2 | 2 | 43 | (Poland) Inter Europol Competition | (United States) Jeremy Clarke (France) Tom Dillmann (Portugal) António Félix da Costa (United States) Bijoy Garg | Oreca 07 | 686 | +19 Laps |
| 11 | LMP2 | 2 | 43 | (Poland) Inter Europol Competition | (United States) Jeremy Clarke (France) Tom Dillmann (Portugal) António Félix da Costa (United States) Bijoy Garg | Gibson GK428 4.2 L V8 | 686 | +19 Laps |
| 12 | LMP2 | 3 | 343 | (Poland) Inter Europol Competition | (New Zealand) Nick Cassidy (Greece) Georgios Kolovos (United States) Nolan Siegel (Poland) Jakub Śmiechowski | Oreca 07 | 685 | +20 Laps |
| 12 | LMP2 | 3 | 343 | (Poland) Inter Europol Competition | (New Zealand) Nick Cassidy (Greece) Georgios Kolovos (United States) Nolan Siegel (Poland) Jakub Śmiechowski | Gibson GK428 4.2 L V8 | 685 | +20 Laps |
| 13 | LMP2 | 4 | 22 | (United States) United Autosports USA | (United Kingdom) Paul di Resta (United States) Dan Goldburg (Sweden) Rasmus Lindh (Switzerland) Grégoire Saucy | Oreca 07 | 685 | +20 Laps |
| 13 | LMP2 | 4 | 22 | (United States) United Autosports USA | (United Kingdom) Paul di Resta (United States) Dan Goldburg (Sweden) Rasmus Lindh (Switzerland) Grégoire Saucy | Gibson GK428 4.2 L V8 | 685 | +20 Laps |
| 14 | LMP2 | 5 | 99 | (United States) AO Racing | (United States) Dane Cameron (United Kingdom) Jonny Edgar (United States) P. J. Hyett (Denmark) Christian Rasmussen | Oreca 07 | 685 | +20 Laps |
| 14 | LMP2 | 5 | 99 | (United States) AO Racing | (United States) Dane Cameron (United Kingdom) Jonny Edgar (United States) P. J. Hyett (Denmark) Christian Rasmussen | Gibson GK428 4.2 L V8 | 685 | +20 Laps |
| 15 | LMP2 | 6 | 52 | (United States) Bryan Herta Autosport with PR1/Mathiasen | (Canada) Misha Goikhberg (United States) Ben Keating (Canada) Parker Thompson (United Kingdom) Harry Tincknell | Oreca 07 | 685 | +20 Laps |
| 15 | LMP2 | 6 | 52 | (United States) Bryan Herta Autosport with PR1/Mathiasen | (Canada) Misha Goikhberg (United States) Ben Keating (Canada) Parker Thompson (United Kingdom) Harry Tincknell | Gibson GK428 4.2 L V8 | 685 | +20 Laps |
| 16 | LMP2 | 7 | 37 | (United States) Intersport Racing | (United States) Jon Field (United Kingdom) Oliver Jarvis (United States) Seth Lucas (Netherlands) Job van Uitert | Oreca 07 | 684 | +21 Laps |
| 16 | LMP2 | 7 | 37 | (United States) Intersport Racing | (United States) Jon Field (United Kingdom) Oliver Jarvis (United States) Seth Lucas (Netherlands) Job van Uitert | Gibson GK428 4.2 L V8 | 684 | +21 Laps |
| 17 | LMP2 | 8 | 8 | (Canada) Tower Motorsports | (Mexico) Sebastián Álvarez (France) Sébastien Bourdais (Canada) John Farano (Cayman Islands) Kyffin Simpson | Oreca 07 | 676 | +29 Laps |
| 17 | LMP2 | 8 | 8 | (Canada) Tower Motorsports | (Mexico) Sebastián Álvarez (France) Sébastien Bourdais (Canada) John Farano (Cayman Islands) Kyffin Simpson | Gibson GK428 4.2 L V8 | 676 | +29 Laps |
| 18 | LMP2 | 9 | 18 | (United States) Era Motorsport | (United States) Jacob Abel (Austria) Ferdinand Habsburg (United States) Naveen Rao (United States) Logan Sargeant | Oreca 07 | 670 | +35 Laps |
| 18 | LMP2 | 9 | 18 | (United States) Era Motorsport | (United States) Jacob Abel (Austria) Ferdinand Habsburg (United States) Naveen Rao (United States) Logan Sargeant | Gibson GK428 4.2 L V8 | 670 | +35 Laps |
| 19 | **GTD Pro** | **1** | **1** | **(United States) Paul Miller Racing** | **(United States) Connor De Phillippi (United Kingdom) Dan Harper (Germany) Max Hesse (United States) Neil Verhagen** | **BMW M4 GT3 Evo** | **662** | **+43 Laps‡** |
| 19 | **GTD Pro** | **1** | **1** | **(United States) Paul Miller Racing** | **(United States) Connor De Phillippi (United Kingdom) Dan Harper (Germany) Max Hesse (United States) Neil Verhagen** | **BMW P58 3.0 L Turbo I6** | **662** | **+43 Laps‡** |
| 20 | GTD Pro | 2 | 75 | (Australia) 75 Express | (Germany) Maro Engel (Australia) Kenny Habul (Australia) Chaz Mostert (Australia) Will Power | Mercedes-AMG GT3 Evo | 662 | +43 Laps |
| 20 | GTD Pro | 2 | 75 | (Australia) 75 Express | (Germany) Maro Engel (Australia) Kenny Habul (Australia) Chaz Mostert (Australia) Will Power | Mercedes-AMG M159 6.2 L V8 | 662 | +43 Laps |
| 21 | GTD Pro | 3 | 48 | (United States) Winward Racing | (United States) Jason Hart (Belgium) Maxime Martin (United States) Scott Noble (Germany) Luca Stolz | Mercedes-AMG GT3 Evo | 662 | +43 Laps |
| 21 | GTD Pro | 3 | 48 | (United States) Winward Racing | (United States) Jason Hart (Belgium) Maxime Martin (United States) Scott Noble (Germany) Luca Stolz | Mercedes-AMG M159 6.2 L V8 | 662 | +43 Laps |
| 22 | GTD Pro | 4 | 4 | (United States) Corvette Racing by Pratt Miller Motorsports | (Netherlands) Nicky Catsburg (United States) Tommy Milner (Argentina) Nicolás Varrone | Chevrolet Corvette Z06 GT3.R | 662 | +43 Laps |
| 22 | GTD Pro | 4 | 4 | (United States) Corvette Racing by Pratt Miller Motorsports | (Netherlands) Nicky Catsburg (United States) Tommy Milner (Argentina) Nicolás Varrone | Chevrolet LT6.R 5.5 L V8 | 662 | +43 Laps |
| 23 | GTD Pro | 5 | 911 | (Germany) Manthey Racing | (Austria) Klaus Bachler (Switzerland) Ricardo Feller (Turkey) Ayhancan Güven (Austria) Thomas Preining | Porsche 911 GT3.R (992) | 662 | +43 Laps |
| 23 | GTD Pro | 5 | 911 | (Germany) Manthey Racing | (Austria) Klaus Bachler (Switzerland) Ricardo Feller (Turkey) Ayhancan Güven (Austria) Thomas Preining | Porsche M97/80 4.2 L Flat-6 | 662 | +43 Laps |
| 24 | GTD Pro | 6 | 9 | (Canada) Pfaff Motorsports | (Italy) Mirko Bortolotti (Italy) Andrea Caldarelli (Canada) James Hinchcliffe (United Kingdom) Sandy Mitchell | Lamborghini Huracán GT3 Evo 2 | 662 | +43 Laps |
| 24 | GTD Pro | 6 | 9 | (Canada) Pfaff Motorsports | (Italy) Mirko Bortolotti (Italy) Andrea Caldarelli (Canada) James Hinchcliffe (United Kingdom) Sandy Mitchell | Lamborghini DGF 5.2 L V10 | 662 | +43 Laps |
| 25 | GTD Pro | 7 | 65 | (Canada) Ford Multimatic Motorsports | (Germany) Christopher Mies (United Kingdom) Sebastian Priaulx (Belgium) Frédéric Vervisch | Ford Mustang GT3 Evo | 661 | +44 Laps |
| 25 | GTD Pro | 7 | 65 | (Canada) Ford Multimatic Motorsports | (Germany) Christopher Mies (United Kingdom) Sebastian Priaulx (Belgium) Frédéric Vervisch | Ford Coyote 5.4 L V8 | 661 | +44 Laps |
| 26 | GTD Pro | 8 | 033 | (United States) Triarsi Competizione | (Italy) Riccardo Agostini (United Kingdom) James Calado (Spain) Miguel Molina (Italy) Alessio Rovera | Ferrari 296 GT3 Evo | 661 | +44 Laps |
| 26 | GTD Pro | 8 | 033 | (United States) Triarsi Competizione | (Italy) Riccardo Agostini (United Kingdom) James Calado (Spain) Miguel Molina (Italy) Alessio Rovera | Ferrari F163CE 3.0 L Turbo V6 | 661 | +44 Laps |
| 27 | **GTD** | **1** | **57** | **(United States) Winward Racing** | **(Austria) Lucas Auer (Netherlands) Indy Dontje (Switzerland) Philip Ellis (United States) Russell Ward** | **Mercedes-AMG GT3 Evo** | **661** | **+44 Laps‡** |
| 27 | **GTD** | **1** | **57** | **(United States) Winward Racing** | **(Austria) Lucas Auer (Netherlands) Indy Dontje (Switzerland) Philip Ellis (United States) Russell Ward** | **Mercedes-AMG M159 6.2 L V8** | **661** | **+44 Laps‡** |
| 28 | GTD | 2 | 44 | (United States) Magnus Racing | (United States) John Potter (United States) Spencer Pumpelly (United States) Madison Snow (Denmark) Nicki Thiim | Aston Martin Vantage AMR GT3 Evo | 661 | +44 Laps |
| 28 | GTD | 2 | 44 | (United States) Magnus Racing | (United States) John Potter (United States) Spencer Pumpelly (United States) Madison Snow (Denmark) Nicki Thiim | Aston Martin AMR16A 4.0 L Turbo V8 | 661 | +44 Laps |
| 29 | GTD | 3 | 27 | (United States) Heart of Racing Team | (Brazil) Eduardo Barrichello (Italy) Mattia Drudi (United Kingdom) Tom Gamble (Canada) Zacharie Robichon | Aston Martin Vantage AMR GT3 Evo | 661 | +44 Laps |
| 29 | GTD | 3 | 27 | (United States) Heart of Racing Team | (Brazil) Eduardo Barrichello (Italy) Mattia Drudi (United Kingdom) Tom Gamble (Canada) Zacharie Robichon | Aston Martin AMR16A 4.0 L Turbo V8 | 661 | +44 Laps |
| 30 | GTD | 4 | 13 | (Canada) 13 Autosport | (United Kingdom) Matt Bell (Canada) Orey Fidani (United Kingdom) Ben Green (Germany) Lars Kern | Chevrolet Corvette Z06 GT3.R | 661 | +44 Laps |
| 30 | GTD | 4 | 13 | (Canada) 13 Autosport | (United Kingdom) Matt Bell (Canada) Orey Fidani (United Kingdom) Ben Green (Germany) Lars Kern | Chevrolet LT6.R 5.5 L V8 | 661 | +44 Laps |
| 31 | GTP | 10 | 23 | (United States) Aston Martin THOR Team | (Canada) Roman De Angelis (United Kingdom) Ross Gunn (Spain) Alex Riberas (Denmark) Marco Sørensen | Aston Martin Valkyrie | 661 | +44 Laps |
| 31 | GTP | 10 | 23 | (United States) Aston Martin THOR Team | (Canada) Roman De Angelis (United Kingdom) Ross Gunn (Spain) Alex Riberas (Denmark) Marco Sørensen | Aston Martin RA 6.5 L V12 | 661 | +44 Laps |
| 32 | GTD | 5 | 21 | (Italy) AF Corse USA | (Italy) Antonio Fuoco (United Kingdom) Simon Mann (Italy) Tommaso Mosca (France) Lilou Wadoux | Ferrari 296 GT3 Evo | 661 | +44 Laps |
| 32 | GTD | 5 | 21 | (Italy) AF Corse USA | (Italy) Antonio Fuoco (United Kingdom) Simon Mann (Italy) Tommaso Mosca (France) Lilou Wadoux | Ferrari F163CE 3.0 L Turbo V6 | 661 | +44 Laps |
| 33 | GTD | 6 | 80 | (United States) Lone Star Racing | (Australia) Scott Andrews (Estonia) Ralf Aron (Netherlands) Lin Hodenius (Republic of Ireland) James Roe | Mercedes-AMG GT3 Evo | 661 | +44 Laps |
| 33 | GTD | 6 | 80 | (United States) Lone Star Racing | (Australia) Scott Andrews (Estonia) Ralf Aron (Netherlands) Lin Hodenius (Republic of Ireland) James Roe | Mercedes-AMG M159 6.2 L V8 | 661 | +44 Laps |
| 34 | GTD Pro | 9 | 77 | (United States) AO Racing | (United Kingdom) Harry King (Belgium) Alessio Picariello (United Kingdom) Nick Tandy | Porsche 911 GT3.R (992) | 660 | +45 Laps |
| 34 | GTD Pro | 9 | 77 | (United States) AO Racing | (United Kingdom) Harry King (Belgium) Alessio Picariello (United Kingdom) Nick Tandy | Porsche M97/80 4.2 L Flat-6 | 660 | +45 Laps |
| 35 | GTD | 7 | 023 | (United States) Triarsi Competizione | (United States) Kenton Koch (United States) Robert Megennis (United States) Onofrio Triarsi (China) Yifei Ye | Ferrari 296 GT3 Evo | 660 | +45 Laps |
| 35 | GTD | 7 | 023 | (United States) Triarsi Competizione | (United States) Kenton Koch (United States) Robert Megennis (United States) Onofrio Triarsi (China) Yifei Ye | Ferrari F163CE 3.0 L Turbo V6 | 660 | +45 Laps |
| 36 | GTD | 8 | 45 | (United States) Wayne Taylor Racing | (United States) Graham Doyle (Sweden) Marcus Ericsson (Costa Rica) Danny Formal (United States) Trent Hindman | Lamborghini Huracán GT3 Evo 2 | 660 | +45 Laps |
| 36 | GTD | 8 | 45 | (United States) Wayne Taylor Racing | (United States) Graham Doyle (Sweden) Marcus Ericsson (Costa Rica) Danny Formal (United States) Trent Hindman | Lamborghini DGF 5.2 L V10 | 660 | +45 Laps |
| 37 | GTD | 9 | 12 | (United States) Vasser Sullivan Racing | (France) Esteban Masson (United States) Frankie Montecalvo (Denmark) Benjamin Pedersen (United States) Aaron Telitz | Lexus RC F GT3 | 660 | +45 Laps |
| 37 | GTD | 9 | 12 | (United States) Vasser Sullivan Racing | (France) Esteban Masson (United States) Frankie Montecalvo (Denmark) Benjamin Pedersen (United States) Aaron Telitz | Toyota 2UR-GSE 5.4 L V8 | 660 | +45 Laps |
| 38 | GTD | 10 | 96 | (United States) Turner Motorsport | (United States) Robby Foley (United States) Patrick Gallagher (Germany) Jens Klingmann (United States) Francis Selldorff | BMW M4 GT3 Evo | 660 | +45 Laps |
| 38 | GTD | 10 | 96 | (United States) Turner Motorsport | (United States) Robby Foley (United States) Patrick Gallagher (Germany) Jens Klingmann (United States) Francis Selldorff | BMW P58 3.0 L Turbo I6 | 660 | +45 Laps |
| 39 | GTD | 11 | 19 | (United States) van der Steur Racing | (France) Sébastien Baud (Thailand) Carl Bennett (France) Valentin Hasse-Clot (United States) Rory van der Steur | Aston Martin Vantage AMR GT3 Evo | 660 | +45 Laps |
| 39 | GTD | 11 | 19 | (United States) van der Steur Racing | (France) Sébastien Baud (Thailand) Carl Bennett (France) Valentin Hasse-Clot (United States) Rory van der Steur | Aston Martin AMR16A 4.0 L Turbo V8 | 660 | +45 Laps |
| 40 | GTD | 12 | 912 | (Germany) Manthey 1st Phorm | (United States) Ryan Hardwick (Italy) Riccardo Pera (Austria) Richard Lietz (Netherlands) Morris Schuring | Porsche 911 GT3.R (992) | 660 | +45 Laps |
| 40 | GTD | 12 | 912 | (Germany) Manthey 1st Phorm | (United States) Ryan Hardwick (Italy) Riccardo Pera (Austria) Richard Lietz (Netherlands) Morris Schuring | Porsche M97/80 4.2 L Flat-6 | 660 | +45 Laps |
| 41 | GTD | 13 | 70 | (United Kingdom) Inception Racing | (Italy) David Fumanelli (United States) Brendan Iribe (United Kingdom) Ollie Millroy (Denmark) Frederik Schandorff | Ferrari 296 GT3 Evo | 659 | +46 Laps |
| 41 | GTD | 13 | 70 | (United Kingdom) Inception Racing | (Italy) David Fumanelli (United States) Brendan Iribe (United Kingdom) Ollie Millroy (Denmark) Frederik Schandorff | Ferrari F163CE 3.0 L Turbo V6 | 659 | +46 Laps |
| 42 | GTD | 14 | 34 | (United States) Conquest Racing | (Spain) Albert Costa (United States) Manny Franco (Italy) Lorenzo Patrese (Netherlands) Thierry Vermeulen | Ferrari 296 GT3 Evo | 659 | +46 Laps |
| 42 | GTD | 14 | 34 | (United States) Conquest Racing | (Spain) Albert Costa (United States) Manny Franco (Italy) Lorenzo Patrese (Netherlands) Thierry Vermeulen | Ferrari F163CE 3.0 L Turbo V6 | 659 | +46 Laps |
| 43 | GTD Pro | 10 | 14 | (United States) Vasser Sullivan Racing | (United Kingdom) Ben Barnicoat (United Kingdom) Jack Hawksworth (United States) Kyle Kirkwood | Lexus RC F GT3 | 659 | +46 Laps |
| 43 | GTD Pro | 10 | 14 | (United States) Vasser Sullivan Racing | (United Kingdom) Ben Barnicoat (United Kingdom) Jack Hawksworth (United States) Kyle Kirkwood | Toyota 2UR-GSE 5.4 L V8 | 659 | +46 Laps |
| 44 | GTD Pro | 11 | 69 | (Germany) Bartone Bros with GetSpeed | (United States) Anthony Bartone (Germany) Maximilian Götz (Andorra) Jules Gounon (Germany) Fabian Schiller | Mercedes-AMG GT3 Evo | 652 | +53 Laps |
| 44 | GTD Pro | 11 | 69 | (Germany) Bartone Bros with GetSpeed | (United States) Anthony Bartone (Germany) Maximilian Götz (Andorra) Jules Gounon (Germany) Fabian Schiller | Mercedes-AMG M159 6.2 L V8 | 652 | +53 Laps |
| 45 | LMP2 | 10 | 2 | (United States) United Autosports USA | (Canada) Phil Fayer (United Kingdom) Ben Hanley (Denmark) Mikkel Jensen (New Zealand) Hunter McElrea | Oreca 07 | 652 | +53 Laps |
| 45 | LMP2 | 10 | 2 | (United States) United Autosports USA | (Canada) Phil Fayer (United Kingdom) Ben Hanley (Denmark) Mikkel Jensen (New Zealand) Hunter McElrea | Gibson GK428 4.2 L V8 | 652 | +53 Laps |
| 46 | GTD | 15 | 123 | (Belgium) Mühlner Motorsport | (United States) Peter Ludwig (United States) Dave Musial (United States) Dave Musial Jr. (New Zealand) Ryan Yardley | Porsche 911 GT3.R (992) | 646 | +59 Laps |
| 46 | GTD | 15 | 123 | (Belgium) Mühlner Motorsport | (United States) Peter Ludwig (United States) Dave Musial (United States) Dave Musial Jr. (New Zealand) Ryan Yardley | Porsche M97/80 4.2 L Flat-6 | 646 | +59 Laps |
| 47 | GTD | 16 | 81 | (United States) DragonSpeed | (Italy) Giacomo Altoè (Italy) Matteo Cairoli (Sweden) Henrik Hedman (United Kingdom) Casper Stevenson | Chevrolet Corvette Z06 GT3.R | 643 | +62 Laps |
| 47 | GTD | 16 | 81 | (United States) DragonSpeed | (Italy) Giacomo Altoè (Italy) Matteo Cairoli (Sweden) Henrik Hedman (United Kingdom) Casper Stevenson | Chevrolet LT6.R 5.5 L V8 | 643 | +62 Laps |
| 48 | GTD Pro | 12 | 59 | (United States) RLL Team McLaren | (United States) Max Esterson (United States) Nikita Johnson (United Kingdom) Dean MacDonald (Estonia) Jüri Vips | McLaren 720S GT3 Evo | 642 | +63 Laps |
| 48 | GTD Pro | 12 | 59 | (United States) RLL Team McLaren | (United States) Max Esterson (United States) Nikita Johnson (United Kingdom) Dean MacDonald (Estonia) Jüri Vips | McLaren M840T 4.0 L Turbo V8 | 642 | +63 Laps |
| 49 | GTD Pro | 13 | 3 | (United States) Corvette Racing by Pratt Miller Motorsports | (Spain) Antonio García (Germany) Marvin Kirchhöfer (United Kingdom) Alexander Sims | Chevrolet Corvette Z06 GT3.R | 637 | +68 Laps |
| 49 | GTD Pro | 13 | 3 | (United States) Corvette Racing by Pratt Miller Motorsports | (Spain) Antonio García (Germany) Marvin Kirchhöfer (United Kingdom) Alexander Sims | Chevrolet LT6.R 5.5 L V8 | 637 | +68 Laps |
| 50 DNF | GTP | 11 | 10 | (United States) Cadillac Wayne Taylor Racing | (Portugal) Filipe Albuquerque (United Kingdom) Will Stevens (United States) Ricky Taylor | Cadillac V-Series.R | 629 | Fire |
| 50 DNF | GTP | 11 | 10 | (United States) Cadillac Wayne Taylor Racing | (Portugal) Filipe Albuquerque (United Kingdom) Will Stevens (United States) Ricky Taylor | Cadillac LMC55R 5.5 L V8 | 629 | Fire |
| 51 DNF | LMP2 | 11 | 73 | (United States) Pratt Miller Motorsports | (Canada) Chris Cumming (Portugal) Manuel Espírito Santo (Brazil) Enzo Fittipaldi (Brazil) Pietro Fittipaldi | Oreca 07 | 612 | Contact damage |
| 51 DNF | LMP2 | 11 | 73 | (United States) Pratt Miller Motorsports | (Canada) Chris Cumming (Portugal) Manuel Espírito Santo (Brazil) Enzo Fittipaldi (Brazil) Pietro Fittipaldi | Gibson GK428 4.2 L V8 | 612 | Contact damage |
| 52 DNF | LMP2 | 12 | 11 | (France) TDS Racing | (Switzerland) Mathias Beche (Denmark) David Heinemeier Hansson (Canada) Tobias Lütke (France) Charles Milesi | Oreca 07 | 608 | Mechanical |
| 52 DNF | LMP2 | 12 | 11 | (France) TDS Racing | (Switzerland) Mathias Beche (Denmark) David Heinemeier Hansson (Canada) Tobias Lütke (France) Charles Milesi | Gibson GK428 4.2 L V8 | 608 | Mechanical |
| 53 DNF | GTD Pro | 14 | 64 | (Canada) Ford Multimatic Motorsports | (United Kingdom) Ben Barker (Norway) Dennis Olsen (Germany) Mike Rockenfeller | Ford Mustang GT3 Evo | 580 | Engine |
| 53 DNF | GTD Pro | 14 | 64 | (Canada) Ford Multimatic Motorsports | (United Kingdom) Ben Barker (Norway) Dennis Olsen (Germany) Mike Rockenfeller | Ford Coyote 5.4 L V8 | 580 | Engine |
| 54 DNF | GTD | 17 | 36 | (United States) DXDT Racing | (Republic of Ireland) Charlie Eastwood (United States) Mason Filippi (New Zealand) Scott McLaughlin (Turkey) Salih Yoluç | Chevrolet Corvette Z06 GT3.R | 568 | Gearbox leak |
| 54 DNF | GTD | 17 | 36 | (United States) DXDT Racing | (Republic of Ireland) Charlie Eastwood (United States) Mason Filippi (New Zealand) Scott McLaughlin (Turkey) Salih Yoluç | Chevrolet LT6.R 5.5 L V8 | 568 | Gearbox leak |
| 55 DNF | GTD | 18 | 66 | (United States) Gradient Racing | (United Kingdom) Till Bechtolsheimer (United States) Joey Hand (United States) Corey Lewis (United States) Jake Walker | Ford Mustang GT3 Evo | 518 | Radiator |
| 55 DNF | GTD | 18 | 66 | (United States) Gradient Racing | (United Kingdom) Till Bechtolsheimer (United States) Joey Hand (United States) Corey Lewis (United States) Jake Walker | Ford Coyote 5.4 L V8 | 518 | Radiator |
| 56 DNF | GTD | 19 | 16 | (United States) Myers Riley Motorsports | (United States) Jenson Altzman (Brazil) Felipe Fraga (France) Romain Grosjean (United States) Sheena Monk | Ford Mustang GT3 Evo | 115 | Contact damage |
| 56 DNF | GTD | 19 | 16 | (United States) Myers Riley Motorsports | (United States) Jenson Altzman (Brazil) Felipe Fraga (France) Romain Grosjean (United States) Sheena Monk | Ford Coyote 5.4 L V8 | 115 | Contact damage |
| 57 DNF | LMP2 | 13 | 83 | (Italy) AF Corse USA | (United States) Dylan Murry (Denmark) Nicklas Nielsen (France) François Perrodo (France) Matthieu Vaxivière | Oreca 07 | 95 | Collision damage |
| 57 DNF | LMP2 | 13 | 83 | (Italy) AF Corse USA | (United States) Dylan Murry (Denmark) Nicklas Nielsen (France) François Perrodo (France) Matthieu Vaxivière | Gibson GK428 4.2 L V8 | 95 | Collision damage |
| 58 DNF | GTD | 20 | 120 | (United States) Wright Motorsports | (United States) Adam Adelson (United Kingdom) Callum Ilott (Australia) Tom Sargent (United States) Elliott Skeer | Porsche 911 GT3.R (992) | 87 | Collision |
| 58 DNF | GTD | 20 | 120 | (United States) Wright Motorsports | (United States) Adam Adelson (United Kingdom) Callum Ilott (Australia) Tom Sargent (United States) Elliott Skeer | Porsche M97/80 4.2 L Flat-6 | 87 | Collision |
| 59 DNF | GTD Pro | 15 | 62 | (United States) Risi Competizione | (Italy) Alessandro Pier Guidi (Italy) Davide Rigon (Brazil) Daniel Serra | Ferrari 296 GT3 Evo | 62 | Collision |
| 59 DNF | GTD Pro | 15 | 62 | (United States) Risi Competizione | (Italy) Alessandro Pier Guidi (Italy) Davide Rigon (Brazil) Daniel Serra | Ferrari F163CE 3.0 L Turbo V6 | 62 | Collision |
| 60 DNF | GTD | 21 | 28 | (United States) RS1 | (Belgium) Jan Heylen (United States) Dillon Machavern (Germany) Sven Müller (United States) Eric Zitza | Porsche 911 GT3.R (992) | 5 | Accident |
| 60 DNF | GTD | 21 | 28 | (United States) RS1 | (Belgium) Jan Heylen (United States) Dillon Machavern (Germany) Sven Müller (United States) Eric Zitza | Porsche M97/80 4.2 L Flat-6 | 5 | Accident |

== Standings after the race ==
GTP Drivers' Championship standings
| Pos. | Driver | Points |
|---|---|---|
| 1 | (France) Julien Andlauer (Germany) Laurin Heinrich (Brazil) Felipe Nasr | 380 |
| 2 | (United Kingdom) Jack Aitken (New Zealand) Earl Bamber (Denmark) Frederik Vesti (United States) Connor Zilisch | 340 |
| 3 | (Netherlands) Robin Frijns (Germany) René Rast (South Africa) Sheldon van der Linde (Belgium) Dries Vanthoor | 323 |
| 4 | (Australia) Matt Campbell (France) Kévin Estre (Belgium) Laurens Vanthoor | 306 |
| 5 | (Japan) Kakunoshin Ohta (Spain) Álex Palou (United Kingdom) Nick Yelloly (Netherlands) Renger van der Zande | 295 |

LMP2 Drivers' Championship standings
| Pos. | Driver | Points |
|---|---|---|
| 1 | (Denmark) Malthe Jakobsen (United States) George Kurtz (United Kingdom) Alex Quinn (United Kingdom) Toby Sowery | 373 |
| 2 | (United States) Jeremy Clarke (France) Tom Dillmann (Portugal) António Félix da Costa (United States) Bijoy Garg | 355 |
| 3 | (New Zealand) Nick Cassidy (Greece) Georgios Kolovos (United States) Nolan Siegel (Poland) Jakub Śmiechowski | 325 |
| 4 | (United Kingdom) Paul di Resta (United States) Dan Goldburg (Sweden) Rasmus Lindh (Switzerland) Grégoire Saucy | 310 |
| 5 | (United States) Dane Cameron (United Kingdom) Jonny Edgar (United States) P.J. Hyett (Denmark) Christian Rasmussen | 292 |

GTD Pro Drivers' Championship standings
| Pos. | Driver | Points |
|---|---|---|
| 1 | (United States) Connor De Phillippi (United Kingdom) Dan Harper (Germany) Max Hesse (United States) Neil Verhagen | 366 |
| 2 | (Germany) Maro Engel (Australia) Kenny Habul (Australia) Chaz Mostert (Australia) Will Power | 350 |
| 3 | (United States) Jason Hart (Belgium) Maxime Martin (United States) Scott Noble (Germany) Luca Stolz | 322 |
| 4 | (Netherlands) Nicky Catsburg (United States) Tommy Milner (Argentina) Nico Varrone | 304 |
| 5 | (Austria) Klaus Bachler (Switzerland) Ricardo Feller (Turkey) Ayhancan Güven (Austria) Thomas Preining | 278 |

GTD Drivers' Championship standings
| Pos. | Driver | Points |
|---|---|---|
| 1 | (Austria) Lucas Auer (Netherlands) Indy Dontje (Switzerland) Philip Ellis (United States) Trent Hindman | 382 |
| 2 | (United States) John Potter (United States) Spencer Pumpelly (United States) Madison Snow (Denmark) Nicki Thiim | 336 |
| 3 | (Brazil) Eduardo Barrichello (Italy) Mattia Drudi (United Kingdom) Tom Gamble (Canada) Zacharie Robichon | 335 |
| 4 | (United Kingdom) Matt Bell (Canada) Orey Fidani (United Kingdom) Ben Green (Germany) Lars Kern | 295 |
| 5 | (Italy) Antonio Fuoco (United States) Simon Mann (Italy) Tommaso Mosca (France) Lilou Wadoux | 285 |

Note: Only the top five positions are included for all sets of standings.

GTP Teams' Championship standings
| Pos. | Team | Points |
|---|---|---|
| 1 | (Germany) #7 Porsche Penske Motorsport | 380 |
| 2 | (United States) #31 Cadillac Whelen | 340 |
| 3 | (Belgium) #24 BMW M Team WRT | 323 |
| 4 | (Germany) #6 Porsche Penske Motorsport | 306 |
| 5 | (United States) #93 Acura Meyer Shank Racing with Curb-Agajanian | 295 |

LMP2 Teams' Championship standings
| Pos. | Team | Points |
|---|---|---|
| 1 | (Portugal) #04 CrowdStrike Racing by APR | 373 |
| 2 | (Poland) #43 Inter Europol Competition | 355 |
| 3 | (Poland) #343 Inter Europol Competition | 325 |
| 4 | (United States) #22 United Autosports USA | 310 |
| 5 | (United States) #99 AO Racing | 292 |

GTD Pro Teams' Championship standings
| Pos. | Team | Points |
|---|---|---|
| 1 | (United States) #1 Paul Miller Racing | 366 |
| 2 | (Australia) #75 75 Express | 350 |
| 3 | (United States) #48 Winward Racing | 322 |
| 4 | (United States) #4 Corvette Racing by Pratt Miller Motorsports | 304 |
| 5 | (Germany) #911 Manthey Racing | 278 |

GTD Teams' Championship standings
| Pos. | Team | Points |
|---|---|---|
| 1 | (United States) #57 Winward Racing | 382 |
| 2 | (United States) #44 Magnus Racing | 336 |
| 3 | (United States) #27 Heart of Racing Team | 335 |
| 4 | (Canada) #13 13 Autosport | 295 |
| 5 | (Italy) #21 AF Corse USA | 285 |

Note: Only the top five positions are included for all sets of standings.

GTP Manufacturers' Championship standings
| Pos. | Manufacturer | Points |
|---|---|---|
| 1 | (Germany) Porsche | 380 |
| 2 | (United States) Cadillac | 352 |
| 3 | (Germany) BMW | 328 |
| 4 | (Japan) Acura | 315 |
| 5 | (United Kingdom) Aston Martin | 286 |

GTD Pro Manufacturers' Championship standings
| Pos. | Manufacturer | Points |
|---|---|---|
| 1 | (Germany) BMW | 372 |
| 2 | (Germany) Mercedes-AMG | 350 |
| 3 | (United States) Chevrolet | 335 |
| 4 | (Germany) Porsche | 303 |
| 5 | (Italy) Lamborghini | 285 |

GTD Manufacturers' Championship standings
| Pos. | Manufacturer | Points |
|---|---|---|
| 1 | (Germany) Mercedes-AMG | 382 |
| 2 | (United Kingdom) Aston Martin | 355 |
| 3 | (United States) Chevrolet | 328 |
| 4 | (Italy) Ferrari | 306 |
| 5 | (Italy) Lamborghini | 284 |

Note: Only the top five positions are included for all sets of standings.

IMSA SportsCar Championship
| Previous race: none | 2026 season | Next race: 12 Hours of Sebring |
