= Ryan Yardley =

New Zealand racing driver (born 1998)

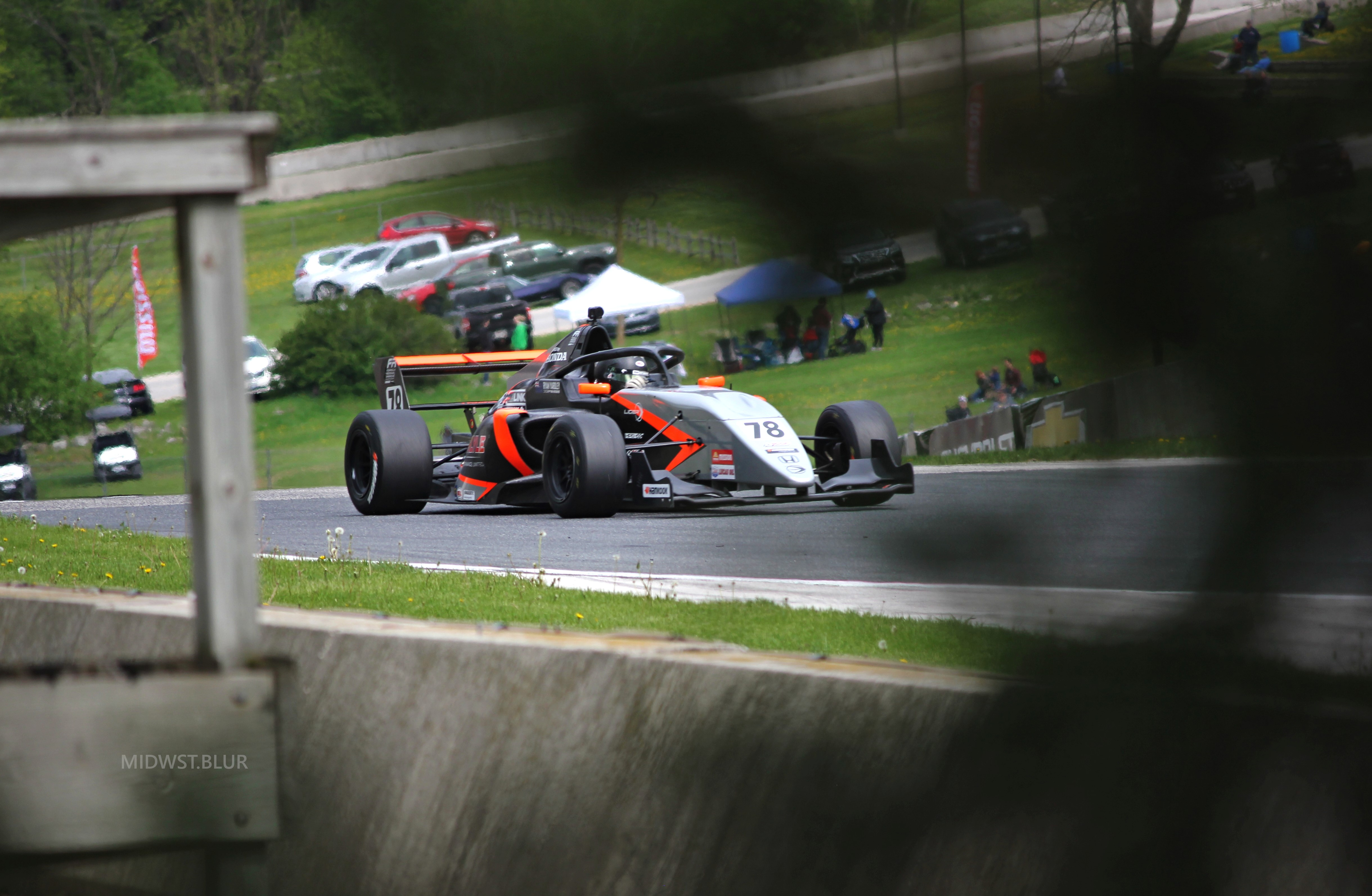
- Yardley in 2022
- Nationality: (New Zealand) New Zealander
- Born: 7 July 1998 (age 28) Christchurch, New Zealand
- Categorisation: FIA Silver

Championship titles
- 2025 2016–17: Porsche Carrera Cup North America; Toyota Finance 86 Championship

Ryan Yardley (born 7 July 1998) is a New Zealand racing driver who last competed in GT World Challenge America for Wright Motorsports and GT4 America Series for ACI Motorsports.

== Career ==
Yardley made his single-seater debut in 2013, racing in Formula Ford New Zealand. After two seasons in the series, Yardley switched to the Toyota Finance 86 Championship for the 2015–16 season, in which he claimed rookie of the year honors. Returning for the 2016–17 season, Yardley won twice and finished on the podium all but four times to secure the title and earning him a one-off appearance in the Australian Toyota 86 series.

In 2018, Yardley joined MTEC Motorsport to race in the Toyota Racing Series at the beginning of the year. In his only season in the series, Yardley scored a lone podium at by finishing second in the reverse-grid race at Taupo en route to a ninth-place points finish. After not racing throughout the rest of the year, Yardley made a one-off appearance with the same team in the 2019 Australian Formula 4 Championship in the Australian Grand Prix-supporting Melbourne round.

Following a year on the sidelines, Yardley joined Kiwi Motorsport to race in the Formula Pro Winter Series, before racing in the last two rounds of the Formula Regional Americas Championship for Crosslink/Kiwi Motorsport. Racing at Virginia and Circuit of the Americas, Yardley scored three podiums with a best result of second twice to take tenth in points. Returning to Crosslink/Kiwi Motorsport for his first full season in Formula Regional Americas the following year, Yardley scored six podiums, with a best result of second at Virginia, to secure fourth in points.

Remaining in the States for 2023, Yardley joined Topp Racing for his rookie year in Porsche Carrera Cup North America. In the eight-round season, Yardley scored a lone podium at Circuit of the Americas by finishing second in race two to finish seventh in points. During 2023, Yardley also made a one-off appearance in the GS class of the Michelin Pilot Challenge for Murillo Racing at Road America.

Returning to Porsche Carrera Cup North America for 2024, Yardley remained with Topp Racing alongside Colin Kaminsky. Starting off the season with three podiums in the first three rounds, Yardley then scored his maiden series win in race one at Watkins Glen from pole. In the second half of the season, Yardley scored wins at Road Atlanta and Circuit of the Americas and took three more podiums to end the year runner-up in points. During 2024, Yardley also raced for Mühlner Motorsport in the 992 Endurance Cup, finishing 26th overall and tenth in the Am class.

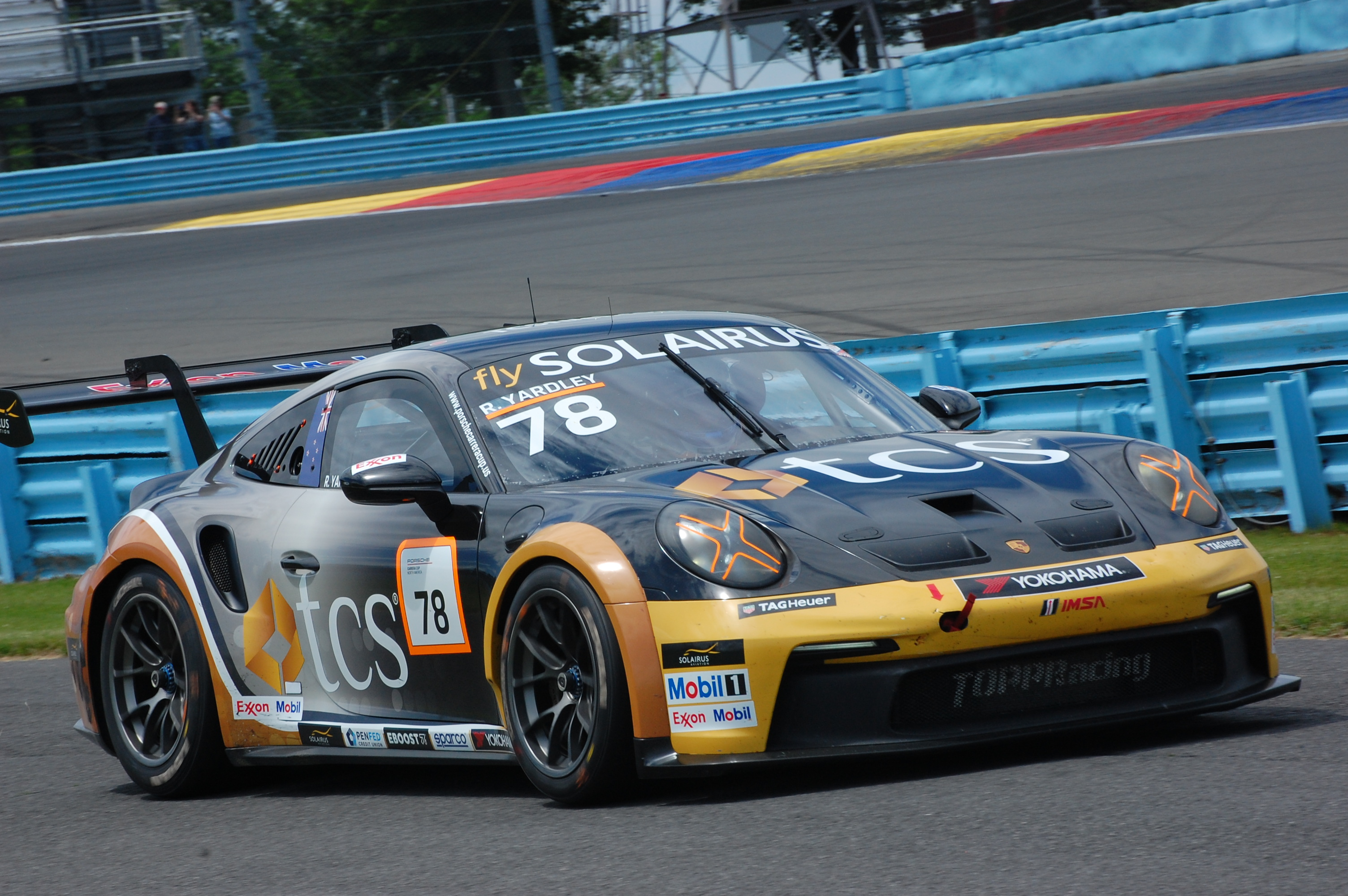
Yardley at Watkins Glen in 2025

Yardley remained with Topp Racing for his third consecutive season in Porsche Carrera Cup North America. After scoring three podiums in the first two rounds, Yardley then took his first win of the season in Montreal, before standing on the podium in the next seven races to take the points lead with two rounds left. Yardley then finished on the podium once at Road Atlanta, before ending the season with a double win at Circuit of the Americas to secure the Porsche Carrera Cup North America title. During 2025, Yardley also made a one-off appearance in the GT4 America Series for ACI Motorsports.

The following year, Yardley returned to Mühlner Motorsport to race in the 24 Hours of Daytona in the GTD class, before making select outings later in IMSA that year with RS1, and was also named a Porsche Motorsport North America selected driver. For the rest of the year, Yardley joined Wright Motorsports to race in the Pro-Am class of GT World Challenge America, and ACI Motorsports to race in the GT4 America Series, also in Pro-Am. In the former, Yardley took an outright win at Circuit of the Americas, as well as three other class podiums to secure runner-up honours in class. Yardley also won the SRO GT Academy and securing a fully-funded drive for the 2027 24 Hours of Spa with AMG-fielding Team Motopark. In GT4 America, Yardley took three class podiums to end his first full-time season in the series fifth in the Pro-Am standings.

== Karting record ==
=== Karting career summary ===
Season	Series	Team	Position
2008	New Zealand Sprint Championship – Cadet		9th
2009	Blossom Festival – Cadet		6th
2010	NZ National Sprint Championship – 100cc Restricted		16th
2011	NZ National Sprint Championship – 100cc Restricted		8th
2012	NZ North Island Sprint Kart Championship – 100cc Yamaha Junior		5th
2012	NZ Schools Championship – 100cc Yamaha		13th
2013	Trophy of New Zealand – Yamaha Junior		5th
2013	NZ Schools Championship – Yamaha Junior		5th
2013	NZ Schools Championship – Formula Junior		2nd
2013	NZ National Sprint Championship – Yamaha Junior		10th
2013	RMC New Zealand – Junior Max		4th
2014	NZ National Sprint Championship – Junior Rotax		6th
2015	NZ National Sprint Championship – Junior Rotax		2nd
2017	NZ Top Half Series – Rotax DD2	Right Karts	10th
2017	RMC New Zealand – Senior Light		8th
2017	RMC New Zealand – DD2		13th
2017	NZ National Sprint Championship – DD2		5th

== Racing record ==
=== Racing career summary ===
Season	Series	Team	Races	Wins	Poles	F/Laps	Podiums	Points	Position
2013–14	New Zealand Formula Ford Championship		18	0	0	0	7	963	4th
2014–15	New Zealand Formula Ford Championship		18	0	0	1	4	838	5th
2015–16	Toyota Finance 86 Championship	CareVets New Zealand	18	2	0	0	5	832	5th
2016–17	Toyota Finance 86 Championship	CareVets New Zealand	18	2	2	6	14	1112	**1st**
2018	Toyota Racing Series	MTEC Motorsport	15	0	0	0	1	525	9th
2019	Australian Formula 4 Championship	MTEC Motorsport	3	0	0	0	1	27	11th
2021	Formula Pro USA Winter Series	Kiwi Motorsport	2	2	0	1	2	52	**2nd**
2021	Formula Regional Americas Championship	Crosslink/Kiwi Motorsport	6	0	0	0	3	67	10th
2022	Formula Regional Americas Championship	Crosslink Kiwi Motorsport	18	0	0	0	6	204	4th
2023	Porsche Carrera Cup North America	Topp Racing	16	0	0	0	1	134	7th
2023	Michelin Pilot Challenge – GS	Murillo Racing	1	0	0	0	0	200	50th
2024	Porsche Carrera Cup North America	Topp Racing Performance	16	3	2	2	10	254	**2nd**
2024	992 Endurance Cup – Am	Mühlner Motorsport	1	0	0	0	0	—N/a	10th
2025	Porsche Carrera Cup North America	Topp Racing	16	3	5	3	14	313	**1st**
2025	GT4 America Series – Pro-Am	ACI Motorsports	2	0	0	0	0	10	13th
2026	IMSA SportsCar Championship – GTD	Mühlner Motorsport	1	0	0	0	0	618	50th
2026	IMSA SportsCar Championship – GTD	RS1	2	0	0	0	0	618	50th
2026	GT World Challenge America – Pro-Am	Wright Motorsports	7	1	0	0	4	116	**2nd**
2026	Intercontinental GT Challenge	Wright Motorsports	1	0	0	0	0	10	25th
2026	GT4 America Series – Pro-Am	ACI Motorsports	13	0	0	0	3	105	5th
2026	Porsche Endurance Challenge North America – GT3 Cup Pro-Am		1	0	0	0	0	26	17th
2027	IMSA SportsCar Championship – GTD	Wright Motorsports							
2027	GT World Challenge Europe Endurance Cup	Team Motopark							
2027	GT World Challenge Europe Endurance Cup – Silver	Team Motopark							

=== Complete Toyota Racing Series results ===
(key) (Races in bold indicate pole position) (Races in italics indicate fastest lap)

Year	Team	1	2	3	4	5	6	7	8	9	10	11	12	13	14	15	DC	Points
2018	MTEC Motorsport	RUA; 1; 13	RUA; 2; 9	RUA; 3; 9	TER; 1; 12	TER; 2; 11	TER; 3; 13	HMP; 1; 13	HMP; 2; 10	HMP; 3; 11	TAU; 1; 7	TAU; 2; 2	TAU; 3; 9	MAN; 1; 7	MAN; 2; 12	MAN; 3; 8	9th	525

=== Complete Formula Regional Americas Championship results ===
(key) (Races in bold indicate pole position) (Races in italics indicate fastest lap)

Year	Team	1	2	3	4	5	6	7	8	9	10	11	12	13	14	15	16	17	18	DC	Points
2021	Crosslink/Kiwi Motorsport	ATL; 1	ATL; 2	ATL; 3	ROA; 1	ROA; 2	ROA; 3	MOH; 1	MOH; 2	MOH; 3	BRA; 1	BRA; 2	BRA; 3	VIR; 1; 3	VIR; 2; 2	VIR; 3; 7	COA; 1; 2	COA; 2; 11	COA; 3; 5	10th	67
2022	Crosslink Kiwi Motorsport	NOL; 1; 6	NOL; 2; 5	NOL; 3; 4	ROA; 1; 3	ROA; 2 Ret	ROA; 3; 6	MOH; 1; 4	MOH; 2; 6	MOH; 3; 4	NJM; 1; 3	NJM; 2; 3	NJM; 3; 6	VIR; 1; 2	VIR; 2; 7	VIR; 3; 3	COA; 1; 3	COA; 2; 4	COA; 3; 3	4th	204

=== Complete Porsche Carrera Cup North America results ===
(key) (Races in bold indicate pole position) (Races in italics indicate fastest lap)

Year	Team	Class	1	2	3	4	5	6	7	8	9	10	11	12	13	14	15	16	Pos	Points
2023	Topp Racing	Pro	SEB; 1; 11	SEB; 2; 25	LBH; 1; 5	LBH; 2; 7	MIA; 1; 4	MIA; 2; 8	WGL; 1; 7	WGL; 2; 11	ROA; 1; 19	ROA; 2; 7	IMS; 1; 28	IMS; 2; 6	LGA; 1; 5	LGA; 2; 5	COA; 1; 7	COA; 2; 2	7th	134
2024	Topp Racing	Pro	SEB; 1; 3	SEB; 2; 2	MIA; 1; 35	MIA; 2; 3	CGV; 1; 9	CGV; 2; 26	**WGL**; **1**; 1	WGL; 2; 3	ROA; 1; 4	ROA; 2; 4	IMS; 1; 2	IMS; 2; 5	ATL; 1; 3	**ATL**; **2**; 1	COT; 1; 3	COT; 2; 1	2nd	254
2025	Topp Racing	Pro	SEB; 1; 2	SEB; 2; 2	MIA; 1; 12	MIA; 2; 2	**CGV**; **1**; 1	**CGV**; **2**; 2	**WGL**; **1**; 2	**WGL**; **2**; 3	ROA; 1; 3	ROA; 2; 2	IMS; 1; 2	IMS; 2; 2	ATL; 1; 5	ATL; 2; 3	**COT**; **1**; 1	**COT**; **2**; 1	1st	313

=== Complete IMSA SportsCar Championship results ===
(key) (Races in bold indicate pole position) (Races in italics indicate fastest lap)

Year	Entrant	Class	Car	Engine	1	2	3	4	5	6	7	8	9	10	Pos.	Points
2026	Mühlner Motorsport	GTD	Porsche 911 GT3 R (992.2)	Porsche M97/80 4.2 L Flat-6	DAY; 15	SEB	LBH	LGA	WGL	MOS					50th	618
2026	RS1	GTD	Porsche 911 GT3 R (992.2)	Porsche M97/80 4.2 L Flat-6							ELK; 10	VIR	IMS	PET; 12	50th	618
