= 2016–17 Toyota Finance 86 Championship =

The 2016–2017 Toyota Finance 86 Championship is the fourth running of the Toyota Finance 86 Championship. The championship began on 4 November 2016 at Pukekohe Park Raceway and will conclude on 12 March 2017 at Hampton Downs Motorsport Park.

== Race calendar ==
Round		Circuit	Date	Map
1	R1	Pukekohe Park Raceway (Pukekohe, Auckland Region)	5 November 2016	2016–17 Toyota Finance 86 Championship is located in New Zealand
1	R2	Pukekohe Park Raceway (Pukekohe, Auckland Region)	6 November 2016	2016–17 Toyota Finance 86 Championship is located in New Zealand
1	R3	Pukekohe Park Raceway (Pukekohe, Auckland Region)	6 November 2016	2016–17 Toyota Finance 86 Championship is located in New Zealand
2	R1	Bruce McLaren Motorsport Park (Taupō, Waikato)	10 December 2016	2016–17 Toyota Finance 86 Championship is located in New Zealand
2	R2	Bruce McLaren Motorsport Park (Taupō, Waikato)	11 December 2016	2016–17 Toyota Finance 86 Championship is located in New Zealand
2	R3	Bruce McLaren Motorsport Park (Taupō, Waikato)	11 December 2016	2016–17 Toyota Finance 86 Championship is located in New Zealand
3	R1	Mike Pero Motorsport Park (Christchurch, Canterbury Region)	14 January 2017	2016–17 Toyota Finance 86 Championship is located in New Zealand
3	R2	Mike Pero Motorsport Park (Christchurch, Canterbury Region)	15 January 2017	2016–17 Toyota Finance 86 Championship is located in New Zealand
3	R3	Mike Pero Motorsport Park (Christchurch, Canterbury Region)	15 January 2017	2016–17 Toyota Finance 86 Championship is located in New Zealand
4	R1	Teretonga Park (Invercargill, Southland Region)	21 January 2017	2016–17 Toyota Finance 86 Championship is located in New Zealand
4	R2	Teretonga Park (Invercargill, Southland Region)	22 January 2017	2016–17 Toyota Finance 86 Championship is located in New Zealand
4	R3	Teretonga Park (Invercargill, Southland Region)	22 January 2017	2016–17 Toyota Finance 86 Championship is located in New Zealand
5	R1	Manfeild: Circuit Chris Amon (Feilding, Manawatū District)	11 February 2017	2016–17 Toyota Finance 86 Championship is located in New Zealand
5	R2	Manfeild: Circuit Chris Amon (Feilding, Manawatū District)	12 February 2017	2016–17 Toyota Finance 86 Championship is located in New Zealand
5	R3	Manfeild: Circuit Chris Amon (Feilding, Manawatū District)	12 February 2017	2016–17 Toyota Finance 86 Championship is located in New Zealand
6	R1	Hampton Downs Motorsport Park (Hampton Downs, North Waikato)	11 March 2017	2016–17 Toyota Finance 86 Championship is located in New Zealand
6	R2	Hampton Downs Motorsport Park (Hampton Downs, North Waikato)	12 March 2017	2016–17 Toyota Finance 86 Championship is located in New Zealand
6	R3	Hampton Downs Motorsport Park (Hampton Downs, North Waikato)	12 March 2017	2016–17 Toyota Finance 86 Championship is located in New Zealand

== Teams and drivers ==
All teams were New-Zealand registered.

Team	No.	Driver	Rounds
West City Motorsport	1	(New Zealand) Ash Blewett	1
Penny Homes Racing	3	(New Zealand) John Penny	1–5
Ascent Motorsport	4	(New Zealand) Reid Harker	1–5
Eastpack	5	(New Zealand) Michael Scott	1–5
TS Racing	6	(New Zealand) Thomas Stokes	1–5
Matt Lockwood Racing	7	(New Zealand) Matt Lockwood	1–4
Alex Sherie Racing	9	(New Zealand) Connor Adam	1–5
Ken Smith Motor Racing	11	(New Zealand) Miles Cockram	1–5
CareVets New Zealand	17	(New Zealand) Jack Milligan	1–5
CareVets New Zealand	18	(New Zealand) Ryan Yardley	1–5
Albany Toyota	14	(Australia) Drew Ridge	1–2
Albany Toyota	23	(New Zealand) Brody McConkey	1–5
Jacob Smith Racing	27	(New Zealand) Jacob Smith	1–5
Ben MacDonald Racing	35	(New Zealand) Ben MacDonald	1–2
Lighting Plus	53	(New Zealand) Jaden Ransley	1–5
Lightfoot Motorsport	96	(New Zealand) Mike Lightfoot	1–4
Neale Motorsport	99	(Australia) Will Brown	1
Neale Motorsport	99	(New Zealand) Martin Short	2
Neale Motorsport	99	(New Zealand) Andy Knight	3–4
Neale Motorsport	99	(New Zealand) Tom Alexander	5

== Results and standings ==
=== Season summary ===
All rounds are to be held in New Zealand. The round one in Pukekohe Park Raceway will be held in support of the V8 Supercars. Rounds 3, 4 and 5 are to be held with the Toyota Racing Series.

Round		Circuit	Pole position	Fastest lap	Winning driver	Winning team	Round winner(s)
2016
1	R1	Pukekohe Park Raceway	(New Zealand) Ash Blewett	(New Zealand) Ryan Yardley	(New Zealand) Ash Blewett	West City Motorsport	(New Zealand) Ash Blewett
1	R2	Pukekohe Park Raceway		(Australia) Will Brown	(New Zealand) Reid Harker	Ascent Motorsport	(New Zealand) Ash Blewett
1	R3	Pukekohe Park Raceway	(New Zealand) Ash Blewett	(Australia) Drew Ridge	(New Zealand) Ash Blewett	West City Motorsport	(New Zealand) Ash Blewett
2	R1	Bruce McLaren Motorsport Park	(New Zealand) Reid Harker	(New Zealand) Matt Lockwood	(New Zealand) John Penny	Penny Homes Racing	(New Zealand) Ryan Yardley
2	R2	Bruce McLaren Motorsport Park		(New Zealand) Reid Harker	(New Zealand) Matt Lockwood	Matt Lockwood Racing	(New Zealand) Ryan Yardley
2	R3	Bruce McLaren Motorsport Park	(New Zealand) Ryan Yardley	(New Zealand) Ryan Yardley	(New Zealand) Matt Lockwood	Matt Lockwood Racing	(New Zealand) Ryan Yardley
2017
3	R1	Mike Pero Motorsport Park	(New Zealand) Reid Harker	(New Zealand) Ryan Yardley	(New Zealand) Reid Harker	Ascent Motorsport	(New Zealand) Reid Harker
3	R2	Mike Pero Motorsport Park		(New Zealand) Michael Scott	(New Zealand) Matt Lockwood	Matt Lockwood Racing	(New Zealand) Reid Harker
3	R3	Mike Pero Motorsport Park	(New Zealand) Reid Harker	(New Zealand) Ryan Yardley	(New Zealand) Reid Harker	Ascent Motorsport	(New Zealand) Reid Harker
4	R1	Teretonga Park	(New Zealand) Reid Harker	(New Zealand) Ryan Yardley	(New Zealand) Ryan Yardley	CareVets New Zealand	(New Zealand) Ryan Yardley
4	R2	Teretonga Park		(New Zealand) Jacob Smith	(New Zealand) Jack Milligan	CareVets New Zealand	(New Zealand) Ryan Yardley
4	R3	Teretonga Park	(New Zealand) Ryan Yardley	(New Zealand) Ryan Yardley	(New Zealand) Ryan Yardley	CareVets New Zealand	(New Zealand) Ryan Yardley
5	R1	Manfeild: Circuit Chris Amon	(New Zealand) Reid Harker	(New Zealand) Reid Harker	(New Zealand) Reid Harker	Ascent Motorsport	(New Zealand) Reid Harker
5	R2	Manfeild: Circuit Chris Amon		(New Zealand) Reid Harker	(New Zealand) Reid Harker	Ascent Motorsport	(New Zealand) Reid Harker
5	R3	Manfeild: Circuit Chris Amon	(New Zealand) Reid Harker	(New Zealand) Michael Scott	(New Zealand) Reid Harker	Ascent Motorsport	(New Zealand) Reid Harker
6	R1	Hampton Downs Motorsport Park	(New Zealand) Tom Alexander	(New Zealand) Tom Alexander	(New Zealand) Tom Alexander	Neale Motorsport	(New Zealand) Reid Harker
6	R2	Hampton Downs Motorsport Park		(New Zealand) Michael Scott	(New Zealand) Reid Harker	Ascent Motorsport	(New Zealand) Reid Harker
6	R3	Hampton Downs Motorsport Park	(New Zealand) Tom Alexander	(New Zealand) Tom Alexander	(New Zealand) Tom Alexander	Neale Motorsport	(New Zealand) Reid Harker

=== Championship standings ===
In order for a driver to score championship points, they had to complete at least 75% of the race winner's distance, and be running at the finish. All races counted towards the final championship standings.

Scoring system

Position	1st	2nd	3rd	4th	5th	6th	7th	8th	9th	10th	11th	12th	13th	14th	15th	16th	17th
Points	75	67	60	54	49	45	42	39	36	33	30	28	26	24	22	20	18

Pos.	Driver	PUK			TAU			RUA			TER			MAN			HAM			Points
Pos.	Driver	R1	R2	R3	R1	R2	R3	R1	R2	R3	R1	R2	R3	R1	R2	R3	R1	R2	R3	Points
1	(New Zealand) Ryan Yardley	2	6	2	2	2	**2**	3	2	7	1	6	**1**	3	2	3	3	4	2	1112
2	(New Zealand) Reid Harker	5	1	3	**3**	6	3	**1**	7	**1**	**12**	10	2	**1**	1	**1**	2	1	3	1059
3	(New Zealand) Michael Scott	4	3	4	4	15	5	2	8	2	2	5	5	2	3	2	5	2	6	991
4	(New Zealand) Jack Milligan	6	4	6	6	7	6	12	9	4	7	1	8	4	4	6	6	3	4	865
5	(New Zealand) Jacob Smith	Ret	DNS	DNS	9	4	8	4	4	5	3	2	4	11	5	5	7	8	9	718
6	(New Zealand) Brody McConkey	10	13	10	7	3	10	5	3	8	9	7	3	8	6	4	4	Ret	Ret	712
7	(New Zealand) John Penny	8	9	9	1	14	4	10	6	12	13	11	6	5	8	7				605
8	(New Zealand) Connor Adam	12	11	13	14	13	14	9	5	3	11	12	11	7	7	Ret	8	6	7	604
9	(New Zealand) Miles Cockram	13	15	Ret	15	11	15	6	13	10	5	9	7	6	9	9	9	5	8	597
10	(New Zealand) Matt Lockwood	7	7	7	8	1	1	8	1	6	Ret	8	Ret							463
11	(New Zealand) Jaden Ransley	11	12	14	12	12	13	11	10	9	8	4	Ret	9	11	Ret	10	7	5	463
12	(New Zealand) Tom Stokes	Ret	DNS	DNS	13	9	12	7	12	13	10	13	9	10	10	8				389
13	(New Zealand) Mike Lightfoot	Ret	14	12	11	8	9	13	11	11	4	Ret	Ret							297
14	(New Zealand) Ash Blewett	**1**	2	**1**																217
15	(Australia) Drew Ridge	Ret	8	8	10	5	7													202
16	(New Zealand) Ben MacDonald	9	10	11	16	16	11													169
17	(Australia) Will Brown	3	5	5																158
18	(New Zealand) Tom Alexander													DNS	DNS	DNS	**1**	Ret	**1**	150
19	(New Zealand) Andy Knight										6	3	10							141
20	(New Zealand) Martin Short				5	10	DNS													82
Pos.	Driver	R1	R2	R3	R1	R2	R3	R1	R2	R3	R1	R2	R3	R1	R2	R3	R1	R2	R3	Points
Pos.	Driver	PUK			TAU			RUA			TER			MAN			HAM			Points

Colour	Result
Gold	Winner
Silver	Second place
Bronze	Third place
Green	Points classification
Blue	Non-points classification
Blue	Non-classified finish (NC)
Purple	Retired, not classified (Ret)
Red	Did not qualify (DNQ)
Red	Did not pre-qualify (DNPQ)
Black	Disqualified (DSQ)
White	Did not start (DNS)
White	Withdrew (WD)
White	Race cancelled (C)
Blank	Did not practice (DNP)
Blank	Did not arrive (DNA)
Blank	Excluded (EX)

**Bold** – Pole
Italics – Fastest Lap
(M) – Driver aged 40 over
(R) – Rookie
