= 2018 Kumho Tyre Australian V8 Touring Car Series =

Motor racing competition

The 2018 Kumho Tyre Australian V8 Touring Car Series was an Australian motor racing competition for de-registered Holden Commodore and Ford Falcon V8 Supercars. It was the 11th running of the series. It commenced at the Phillip Island Grand Prix Circuit on 20 April and concluded at The Bend Motorsport Park on 25 August.

The series was won by Tyler Everingham driving a Ford Falcon FG. Defending series winner Jack Smith ran a part-time schedule, essentially surrendering his title defense.

== Teams and drivers ==
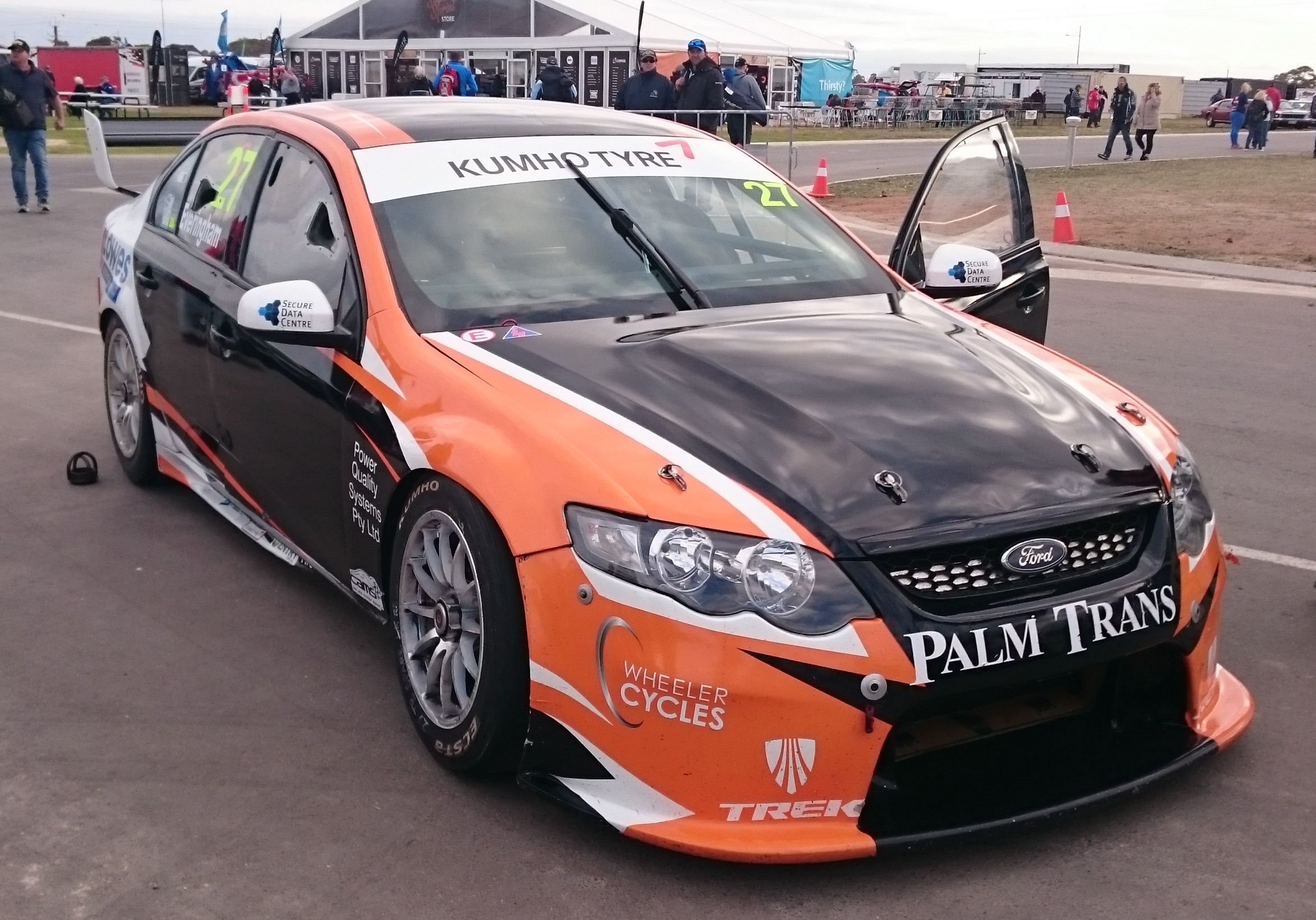
Tyler Everingham won the series driving a Ford Falcon FG

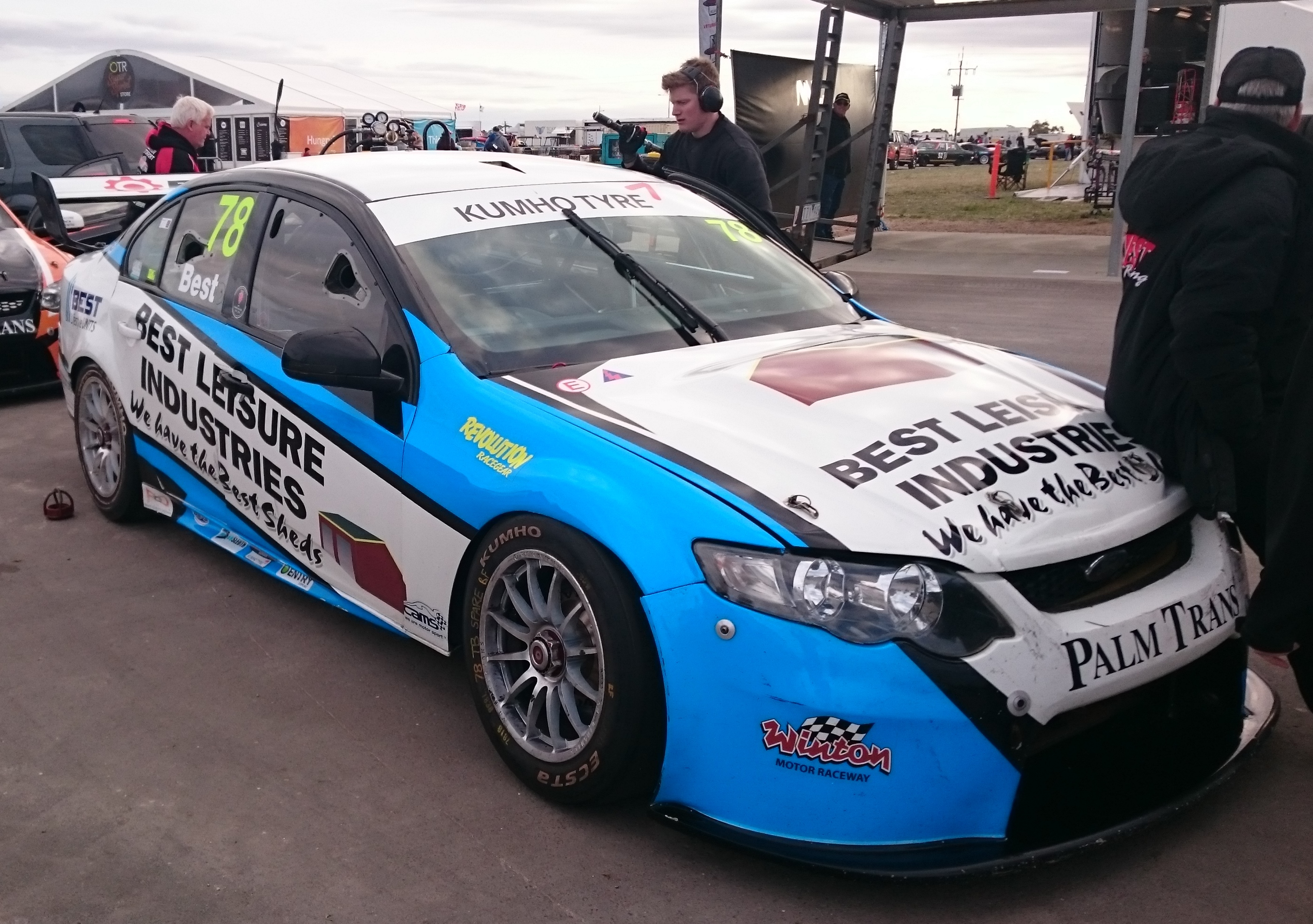
Zak Best placed second in the series driving a Ford Falcon FG

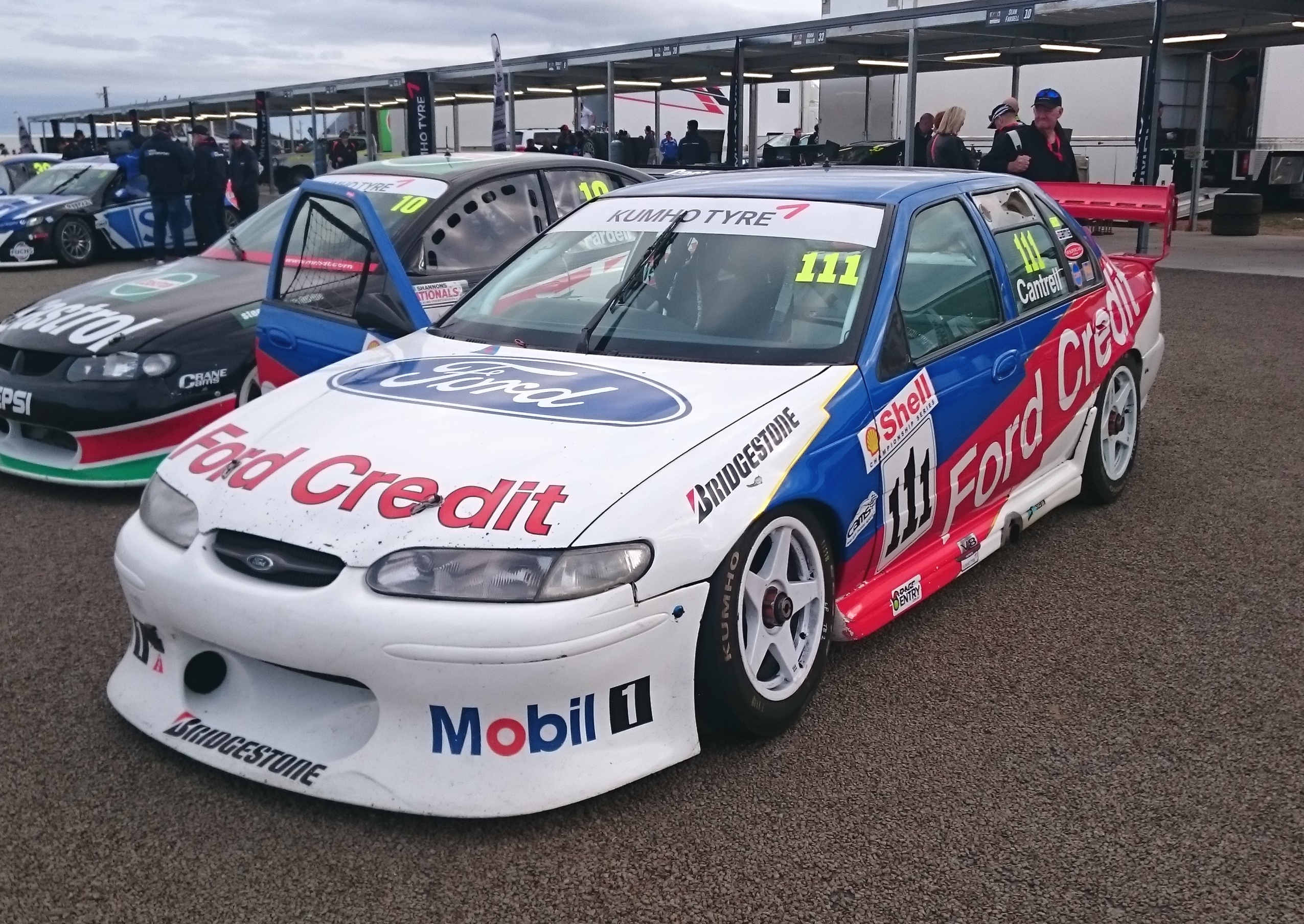
Andy Cantrell placed 15th in the series driving a Ford Falcon EL and won the Heritage class

The following teams and drivers contested the series. The initial field consisted of 22 entries.

Entrant	Vehicle	No.	Driver	Class	Rounds
Page Bros, Jayco	Holden Commodore (VE)	2	(Australia) Steven Page	K	All
Auddino Racing	Ford Falcon (BF)	4	(Australia) Tony Auddino	K	1
Mocomm Motorsports Communications	Holden Commodore (VE)	7	(Australia) Jim Pollicina	K	All
Image Racing	Ford Falcon (FG)	8	(New Zealand) Mathew Radisich	C	1
Image Racing	Ford Falcon (FG)	15	(Australia) Jacob Bell	C	1–2
Image Racing	Ford Falcon (FG)	49	(Australia) Jordan Boys	C	2
Image Racing	Ford Falcon (FG)	51	(Australia) Maxim Erickson	C	4–5
Image Racing	Ford Falcon (FG)	99	(Australia) Harley Haber	C	4–5
Matt Stone Racing	Ford Falcon (FG)	9	(Australia) Bradley Neill	K	All
Matt Stone Racing	Ford Falcon (FG)	39	(Australia) Chris Smerdon	K	1–2, 4–5
Mr HDT Race Cars & Engines	Holden Commodore (VX)	10	(Australia) Sean Fardell	H	2, 4
Mr HDT Race Cars & Engines	Holden Commodore (VX)	10	(Australia) Blake Fardell	H	5
Kenwood Homes	Ford Falcon (FG)	11	(Australia) Michael Anderson	C	All
Jason Foley Racing	Ford Falcon (BF)	17	(Australia) Jason Foley	K	2–3
Twin City Roller Doors	Ford Falcon (BA)	19	(Australia) Mark Tracey	K	5
Brad Jones Racing	Holden Commodore (VE)	21	(Australia) Jack Smith	C	1–2, 5
Brad Jones Racing	Holden Commodore (VE)	21	(Australia) Harry Hayek	C	4
HF Racing	Holden Commodore (VZ)	23	(Australia) Francois Habib	K	2, 5
Nandi Kiss Racing	Holden Commodore (VE)	24	(Australia) Nandi Kiss	K	2–4
MW Motorsport	Ford Falcon (FG)	27	(Australia) Tyler Everingham	C	All
MW Motorsport	Ford Falcon (FG)	78	(Australia) Zak Best	C	All
McDonald Motorsport	Holden Commodore (VP)	33	(Australia) Jamie McDonald	H	3
Warrin Mining	Holden Commodore (VE)	33	(Australia) Adam Wallis	K	5
Dial Before You Dig Racing	Ford Falcon (BF)	41	(Australia) Mark Primmer	C	1, 3, 5
Dial Before You Dig Racing	Ford Falcon (BF)	69	(Australia) Jon McCorkindale	C	All
Brendon Strong Electrical	Holden Commodore (VE)	75	(Australia) Brendon Strong	K	1–4
Garry Hills Racing	Holden Commodore (VE)	76	(Australia) Garry Hills	K	All
Protrack Automotive Performance	Holden Commodore (VE)	77	(Australia) Gary Collins	K	1–2
Wake Up! Racing	Holden Commodore (VZ)	88	(Australia) Warren Millett	K	1–3
Aussie Driver Search	Ford Falcon (FG)	96	(Australia) Ryal Harris	C	1
Custom Garage	Ford Falcon (EL)	111	(Australia) Andy Cantrell	H	All
Geoff Emery Motorsport	Holden Commodore (VE)	888	(Australia) Geoff Emery	K	1

== Calendar and results ==
The calendar expanded upon its support status at Supercars Championship events, with a five-round calendar announced at the end of 2017. The series started at the Phillip Island Grand Prix Circuit on April 20 and concluded at The Bend Motorsport Park on August 25. A non-points round at the Gold Coast 600 was added after the Stadium Super Truck series was dropped from the program.

Rnd		Circuit	Date	Pole position	Fastest lap	Winning driver	Winning team	Kumho winner	Heritage winner
1	R1	(Victoria (state)) Phillip Island Grand Prix Circuit (Phillip Island, Victoria)	April 20–22	(Australia) Jack Smith	(Australia) Jack Smith	(Australia) Jack Smith	Brad Jones Racing	(Australia) Jim Pollicina	(Australia) Andy Cantrell
1	R2	(Victoria (state)) Phillip Island Grand Prix Circuit (Phillip Island, Victoria)	April 20–22		(Australia) Jack Smith	(Australia) Zak Best	MW Motorsport	(Australia) Jim Pollicina	(Australia) Andy Cantrell
1	R3	(Victoria (state)) Phillip Island Grand Prix Circuit (Phillip Island, Victoria)	April 20–22		(Australia) Jack Smith	(Australia) Jack Smith	Brad Jones Racing	(Australia) Chris Smerdon	(Australia) Andy Cantrell
2	R1	(Victoria (state)) Winton Motor Raceway (Benalla, Victoria)	May 18–20	(Australia) Jordan Boys	(Australia) Tyler Everingham	(Australia) Jack Smith	Brad Jones Racing	(Australia) Garry Hills	no finishers
2	R2	(Victoria (state)) Winton Motor Raceway (Benalla, Victoria)	May 18–20		(Australia) Jordan Boys	(Australia) Tyler Everingham	MW Motorsport	(Australia) Garry Hills	(Australia) Andy Cantrell
2	R3	(Victoria (state)) Winton Motor Raceway (Benalla, Victoria)	May 18–20		(Australia) Tyler Everingham	(Australia) Jack Smith	Brad Jones Racing	(Australia) Jim Pollicina	(Australia) Andy Cantrell
3	R1	Sydney Motorsport Park (Sydney, New South Wales)	June 8–10	(Australia) Tyler Everingham	(Australia) Tyler Everingham	(Australia) Tyler Everingham	MW Motorsport	(Australia) Jim Pollicina	(Australia) Andy Cantrell
3	R2	Sydney Motorsport Park (Sydney, New South Wales)	June 8–10		(Australia) Tyler Everingham	(Australia) Tyler Everingham	MW Motorsport	(Australia) Jim Pollicina	(Australia) Andy Cantrell
3	R3	Sydney Motorsport Park (Sydney, New South Wales)	June 8–10		(Australia) Zak Best	(Australia) Jon McCorkindale	Dial Before You Dig Racing	(Australia) Jim Pollicina	(Australia) Andy Cantrell
4	R1	Queensland Raceway (Ipswich, Queensland)	July 20–22	(Australia) Zak Best	(Australia) Tyler Everingham	(Australia) Tyler Everingham	MW Motorsport	(Australia) Jim Pollicina	(Australia) Andy Cantrell
4	R2	Queensland Raceway (Ipswich, Queensland)	July 20–22		(Australia) Tyler Everingham	(Australia) Tyler Everingham	MW Motorsport	(Australia) Jim Pollicina	(Australia) Andy Cantrell
4	R3	Queensland Raceway (Ipswich, Queensland)	July 20–22		(Australia) Zak Best	(Australia) Zak Best	MW Motorsport	(Australia) Jim Pollicina	(Australia) Andy Cantrell
5	R1	The Bend Motorsport Park (Tailem Bend, South Australia)	August 24–26	(Australia) Zak Best	(Australia) Tyler Everingham	(Australia) Tyler Everingham	MW Motorsport	(Australia) Harley Haber	(Australia) Andy Cantrell
5	R2	The Bend Motorsport Park (Tailem Bend, South Australia)	August 24–26		(Australia) Tyler Everingham	(Australia) Tyler Everingham	MW Motorsport	(Australia) Harley Haber	(Australia) Blake Fardell
5	R3	The Bend Motorsport Park (Tailem Bend, South Australia)	August 24–26		(Australia) Zak Best	(Australia) Tyler Everingham	MW Motorsport	(Australia) Harley Haber	(Australia) Blake Fardell
NC	R1	Surfers Paradise Street Circuit (Gold Coast, Queensland)	October 20–21	(Australia) Tyler Everingham	(Australia) Jack Smith	(Australia) Tyler Everingham	MW Motorsport	(Australia) Chris Smerdon	no finishers
NC	R2	Surfers Paradise Street Circuit (Gold Coast, Queensland)	October 20–21		(Australia) Tyler Everingham	(Australia) Jack Smith	Brad Jones Racing	(Australia) Chris Smerdon	(Australia) Blake Fardell
NC	R3	Surfers Paradise Street Circuit (Gold Coast, Queensland)	October 20–21		(Australia) Jack Smith	(Australia) Jack Smith	Brad Jones Racing	(Australia) Shane Hunt	(Australia) Blake Fardell
