= 2022 12 Hours of Sebring =

Sports car endurance race

Sebring International Raceway

The 2022 12 Hours of Sebring (formally known as the 70th Mobil 1 Twelve Hours of Sebring Presented by Advance Auto Parts) was an endurance sports car race held at Sebring International Raceway near Sebring, Florida from 16 to 19 March 2022. It was the second round of both the 2022 IMSA SportsCar Championship and the Michelin Endurance Cup. JDC-Mustang Sampling Racing entered as the defending overall winners of the 12-hour event.

== Background ==
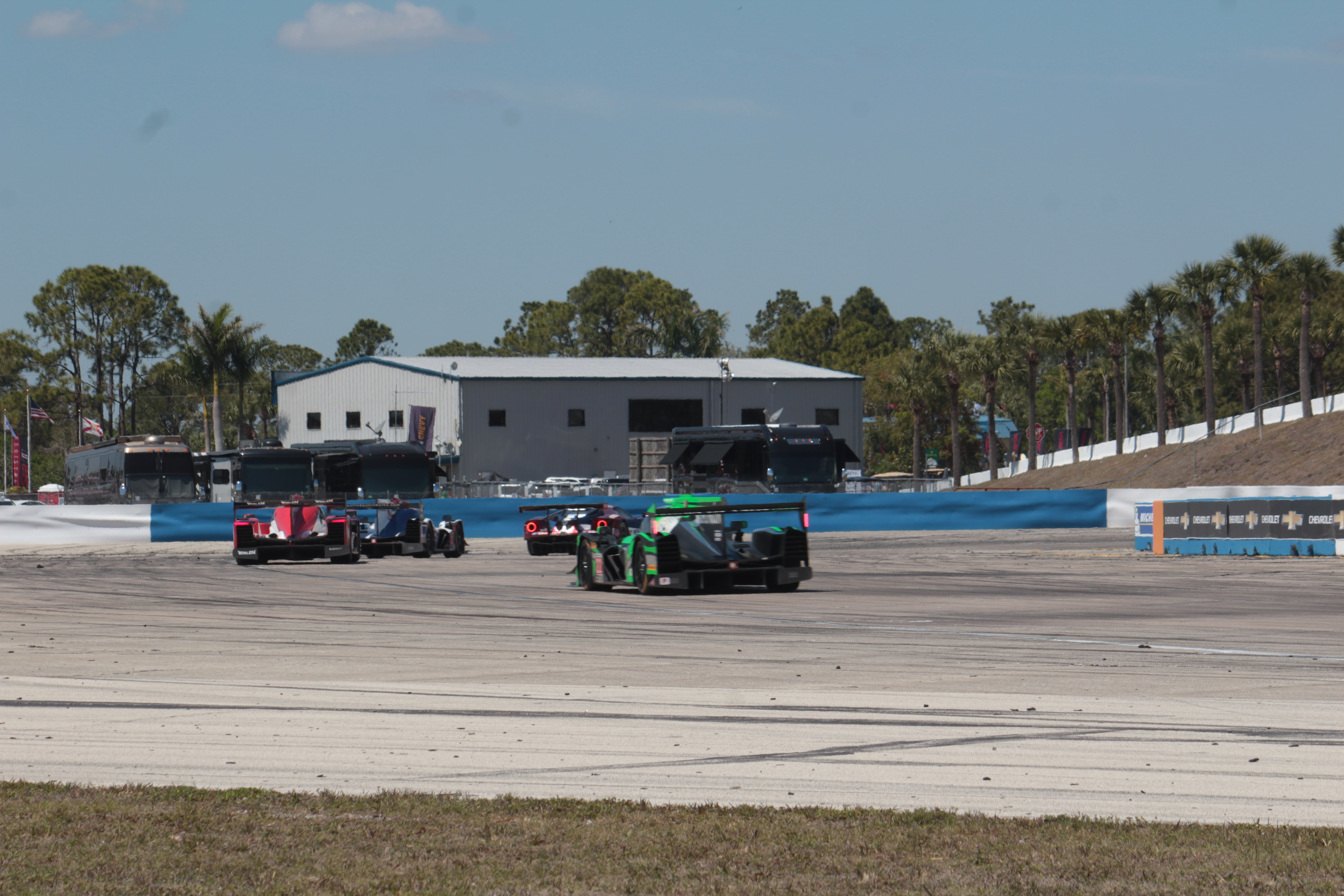
Sebring International Raceway, where the race was held.

International Motor Sports Association's (IMSA) president John Doonan confirmed the race was part of the schedule for the 2022 IMSA SportsCar Championship (IMSA SCC) in August 2021. It was the ninth consecutive year it was part of the IMSA SCC, and 70th 12 Hours of Sebring. The 12 Hours of Sebring was the second of twelve scheduled sports car endurance races of 2022 by IMSA, and the second of four races of the Michelin Endurance Cup (MEC). It was held at the 17-turn, 3.741-mile (6.021 km) Sebring International Raceway in Sebring, Florida on March 19, 2022.

The 2022 edition marked the return of the "Super Sebring" weekend, in which both the IMSA SportsCar Championship and FIA World Endurance Championship would compete during the same weekend; the 12 hour event joining the 1000 Miles of Sebring. Last held in 2019, the WEC round was canceled in 2020 and 2021 due to the effects of the COVID-19 pandemic. The 2022 date also fell on the same weekend as the IndyCar Series round at Texas Motor Speedway, prompting several full-time IndyCar competitors to vacate their seats for the event.

On March 9, 2022, IMSA released the latest technical bulletin outlining Balance of Performance for the event. Changes were made from the BoP tables most recently established at the 2021 season-ending Petit Le Mans, as the 24 Hours of Daytona featured its own unique BoP tables. No changes were made across the three prototype classes, while several changes were made in GTD and GTD Pro. The Acura NSX GT3 Evo22 was given a 20 kilogram weight reduction as well as turbo boost tweaks, while the new BMW M4 GT3 and Chevrolet Corvette C8.R (in GTD trim) were given 5 and 20 kilogram weight reductions respectively following the 24 Hours of Daytona. The McLaren 720S GT3 received a slight turbo boost reduction, while the Lexus RC F GT3 received a minor horsepower increase. The Mercedes-AMG GT3 received a 10 kilogram weight reduction. On Friday morning, the Corvette received a mid-event adjustment, gaining 20 additional horsepower and a fuel capacity increase of 4 liters.

Before the race, Tom Blomqvist, Oliver Jarvis, Hélio Castroneves, and Simon Pagenaud led the DPi Drivers' Championship with 378 points, ahead of Filipe Albuquerque, Ricky Taylor, Will Stevens, and Alexander Rossi in second position with 355 points. Matt Campbell, Mathieu Jaminet, and Felipe Nasr led the GTD Pro Drivers' Championship with 382 points, 42 points ahead of Davide Rigon, Daniel Serra, James Calado, and Alessandro Pier Guidi. In GTD, Ryan Hardwick, Jan Heylen, Zacharie Robichon, and Richard Lietz led the Drivers' Championship with 370 points followed by Andy Lally, John Potter, Spencer Pumpelly, and Jonathan Adam. Acura and Porsche were leading their respective Manufactures' Championships while Meyer Shank Racing, Pfaff Motorsports, and Wright Motorsports each led their own Teams' Championships. LMP2 drivers and teams as well as LMP3 drivers and teams would be scoring their first championship points of the season due to Daytona only counting towards the Michelin Endurance Cup championship.

Supporting the race during the week were IMSA's Michelin Pilot Challenge and Porsche Carrera Cup North America.

=== Entries ===
A total of 53 cars took part in the event, split across five classes. 7 were entered in DPi, 8 in LMP2, 10 in LMP3, 11 in GTD Pro, and 17 in GTD. In DPI, all seven cars which contested the season-opening 24 Hours of Daytona returned, albeit with altered driver lineups. Neel Jani was drafted in to replace Kevin Magnussen in Chip Ganassi Racing's No. 02 entry, with Magnussen rejoining Haas F1 Team following the departure of Nikita Mazepin. Meyer Shank Racing's Hélio Castroneves was replaced by Stoffel Vandoorne due to the former's IndyCar commitments, while Ryan Hunter-Reay (Chip Ganassi Racing) and José María López (Ally Cadillac Racing) replaced Scott Dixon and Jimmie Johnson respectively for the same reason. LMP2 saw eight of the ten entries return, with G-Drive Racing by APR's pair of entries being the lone absence. In LMP3, Mühlner Motorsport dropped to a single entry, while Jr III Racing and FastMD Racing made their 2022 debuts, boosting the class to 10 entries.

GTD Pro saw the introduction of Racers Edge Motorsports and their Acura NSX GT3 Evo22, while WeatherTech Racing returned with their No. 97 Mercedes-AMG GT3 Evo following a planned one-off at the 24 Hours of Daytona. Aaron Telitz also replaced Texas-bound Kyle Kirkwood in the No. 12 Lexus, while Scott Andrews filled Telitz's seat in the No. 14. The absence of KCMG's Porsche, the #4 Corvette, and WeatherTech Racing's No. 15 Mercedes saw the entry list fall to 11.

17 cars were listed in GTD, five fewer than the field that contested the 24 Hours of Daytona. Paul Miller Racing made their 2022 debut, while entries from Team TGM, TR3 Racing, GMG Racing, T3 Motorsport, SunEnergy1 Racing, and Northwest AMR were dropped.

== Practice ==
There were four practice sessions preceding the start of the race on Saturday, 3 on Thursday and one on Friday. The first two session 90 minute sessions were on Thursday morning and afternoon. The third held later that evening ran for 90 minutes while the fourth session on Friday lasted 15 minutes.

== Qualifying ==
Friday's morning qualifying was broken into three sessions, with one session for the DPi and LMP2, LMP3, GTD Pro and GTD classes, which lasted for 15 minutes each, and a ten minute interval between the sessions. The rules dictated that all teams nominated a driver to qualify their cars, with the Pro-Am (LMP2/LMP3/GTD) classes requiring a Bronze/Silver Rated Driver to qualify the car. The competitors' fastest lap times determined the starting order. IMSA then arranged the grid to put DPis ahead of the LMP2, LMP3, GTD Pro, and GTD cars.

=== Qualifying results ===
Pole positions in each class are indicated in bold and by ‡.

| Pos. | Class | No. | Team | Driver | Time | Gap | Grid |
|---|---|---|---|---|---|---|---|
| 1 | **DPi** | **01** | **(United States) Cadillac Racing** | **(France) Sébastien Bourdais** | **1:45.166** | **_** | 1‡ |
| 2 | DPi | 31 | (United States) Whelen Engineering Racing | (Brazil) Pipo Derani | 1:45.192 | +0.026 | 2 |
| 3 | DPi | 10 | (United States) WTR - Konica Minolta Acura | (United States) Ricky Taylor | 1:45.301 | +0.135 | 3 |
| 4 | DPi | 02 | (United States) Cadillac Racing | (United Kingdom) Alex Lynn | 1:45.323 | +0.157 | 4 |
| 5 | DPi | 48 | (United States) Ally Cadillac Racing | (Germany) Mike Rockenfeller | 1:45.576 | +0.410 | 5 |
| 6 | DPi | 60 | (United States) Meyer Shank Racing with Curb-Agajanian | (United Kingdom) Tom Blomqvist | 1:45.576 | +0.410 | 6 |
| 7 | **LMP2** | **52** | **(United States) PR1/Mathiasen Motorsports** | **(United States) Ben Keating** | **1:49.954** | **+4.788** | 8‡ |
| 8 | LMP2 | 81 | (United States) DragonSpeed USA | (Sweden) Henrik Hedman | 1:50.592 | +5.426 | 9 |
| 9 | LMP2 | 11 | (United States) PR1/Mathiasen Motorsports | (United States) Steven Thomas | 1:50.732 | +5.566 | 15 (Note: The no. 11 PR1/Mathiasen Motorsports entry was moved to the rear of the LMP2 classification due to a technical infraction.) |
| 10 | DPi | 5 | (United States) JDC-Miller MotorSports | (France) Tristan Vautier | 1:51.338 | +6.172 | 7 |
| 11 | LMP2 | 18 | (United States) Era Motorsport | (United States) Dwight Merriman | 1:51.584 | +6.418 | 10 |
| 12 | LMP2 | 29 | (Netherlands) Racing Team Nederland | (Netherlands) Frits van Eerd | 1:51.679 | +6.513 | 11 |
| 13 | LMP2 | 8 | (United States) Tower Motorsport | (Canada) John Farano | 1:51.890 | +6.724 | 12 |
| 14 | LMP2 | 20 | (Denmark) High Class Racing | (Denmark) Dennis Andersen | 1:52.507 | +7.341 | 13 |
| 15 | LMP2 | 22 | (United Kingdom) United Autosports | (United States) James McGuire | 1:53.209 | +8.043 | 14 |
| 16 | **LMP3** | **74** | **(United States) Riley Motorsports** | **(United States) Gar Robinson** | **1:57.048** | **+11.882** | 16‡ |
| 17 | LMP3 | 36 | (United States) Andretti Autosport | (United States) Jarett Andretti | 1:57.083 | +11.917 | 17 |
| 18 | LMP3 | 6 | (Belgium) Mühlner Motorsports America | (United States) Harry Gottsacker | 1:57.610 | +12.444 | 18 |
| 19 | LMP3 | 40 | (United States) FastMD Racing | (United States) Max Hanratty | 1:57.719 | +12.553 | 19 |
| 20 | LMP3 | 38 | (United States) Performance Tech Motorsports | (United States) Dan Goldburg | 1:58.087 | +12.921 | 20 |
| 21 | LMP3 | 54 | (United States) CORE Autosport | (United States) George Kurtz | 1:58.717 | +13.551 | 21 |
| 22 | **GTD Pro** | **62** | **(United States) Risi Competizione** | **(Brazil) Daniel Serra** | **1:59.414** | **+14.248** | 26‡ |
| 23 | GTD Pro | 63 | (United States) TR3 Racing | (Italy) Mirko Bortolotti | 1:59.431 | +14.265 | 27 |
| 24 | **GTD** | **16** | **(United States) Wright Motorsports** | **(Canada) Zacharie Robichon** | **1:59.763** | **+14.597** | 28‡ |
| 25 | LMP3 | 33 | (United States) Sean Creech Motorsport | (United States) Lance Willsey | 1:59.781 | +14.615 | 22 |
| 26 | GTD | 96 | (United States) Turner Motorsport | (United States) Robby Foley | 1:59.788 | +14.622 | 29 |
| 27 | GTD | 57 | (United States) Winward Racing | (United States) Russell Ward | 1:59.848 | +14.682 | 53 (Note: The no. 57 Winward Racing entry was moved to the rear of the GTD classification after the car failed to meet the minimum ride height after qualifying.) |
| 28 | GTD | 1 | (United States) Paul Miller Racing | (United States) Madison Snow | 1:59.898 | +14.732 | 30 |
| 29 | GTD | 47 | (Italy) Cetilar Racing | (Italy) Giorgio Sernagiotto | 1:59.917 | +14.751 | 31 |
| 30 | GTD Pro | 3 | (United States) Corvette Racing | (Spain) Antonio Garcia | 1:59.927 | +14.761 | 32 |
| 31 | GTD Pro | 23 | (United States) Heart of Racing Team | (Spain) Alex Riberas | 1:59.957 | +14.791 | 33 |
| 32 | GTD Pro | 9 | (Canada) Pfaff Motorsports | (Australia) Matt Campbell | 1:59.982 | +14.816 | 34 |
| 33 | GTD Pro | 14 | (United States) Vasser Sullivan Racing | (United States) Aaron Telitz | 2:00.002 | +14.836 | 35 |
| 34 | GTD Pro | 24 | (United States) BMW M Team RLL | (United Kingdom) Nick Yelloly | 2:00.031 | +14.865 | 36 |
| 35 | GTD | 32 | (United States) Team Korthoff Motorsports | (United States) Mike Skeen | 2:00.176 | +15.010 | 37 |
| 36 | GTD | 21 | (Italy) AF Corse | (United Kingdom) Simon Mann | 2:00.203 | +15.037 | 38 |
| 37 | LMP3 | 30 | (United States) Jr III Racing | (United States) Ari Balogh | 2:00.230 | +15.064 | 23 |
| 38 | GTD Pro | 25 | (United States) BMW M Team RLL | (Brazil) Augusto Farfus | 2:00.460 | +15.294 | 39 |
| 39 | LMP3 | 13 | (Canada) AWA | (Canada) Orey Fidani | 2:00.487 | +15.321 | 24 |
| 40 | GTD Pro | 93 | (United States) WTR - Racers Edge Motorsports | (Canada) Kyle Marcelli | 2:00.605 | +15.439 | 40 |
| 41 | LMP3 | 7 | (United States) Forty7 Motorsports | (Canada) Anthony Mantella | 2:00.624 | +15.458 | 25 |
| 42 | GTD | 28 | (United States) Alegra Motorsports | (United States) Michael de Quesada | 2:00.919 | +15.753 | 41 |
| 43 | GTD Pro | 79 | (United States) WeatherTech Racing | (France) Julien Andlauer | 2:00.951 | +15.785 | 42 |
| 44 | GTD | 59 | (United States) Crucial Motorsports | (United States) Jon Miller | 2:01.287 | +16.121 | 43 |
| 45 | GTD | 66 | (United States) Gradient Racing | (United Kingdom) Till Bechtolsheimer | 2:01.352 | +16.186 | 44 |
| 46 | GTD | 12 | (United States) Vasser Sullivan Racing | (United States) Frankie Montecalvo | 2:01.536 | +16.370 | 45 |
| 47 | GTD Pro | 97 | (United States) WeatherTech Racing | (United States) Cooper MacNeil | 2:01.947 | +16.781 | 46 |
| 48 | GTD | 39 | (United States) CarBahn with Peregrine Racing | (United States) Robert Megennis | 2:01.973 | +16.807 | 47 |
| 49 | GTD | 27 | (United States) Heart of Racing Team | (United Kingdom) Ian James | 2:02.271 | +17.105 | 48 |
| 50 | GTD | 42 | (United States) NTE Sport/SSR | (United States) Don Yount | 2:05.834 | +20.668 | 49 |
| — | GTD | 44 | (United States) Magnus Racing | No Time Established (Note: The no. 44 Magnus Racing entry had its two fastest laps invalidated for causing a red flag during the qualifying session.) | | | 50 |
| — | GTD | 70 | (United Kingdom) Inception Racing with Optimum Motorsport | Did Not Participate | | | 51 |
| — | GTD | 99 | (United States) Team Hardpoint | Did Not Participate | | | 52 (Note: The no. 99 Team Hardpoint entry was moved to the rear of the GTD classification after undergoing a chassis change following qualifying.) |

== Post-race ==
Vauiter, Westbrook, and Duval's second place finish allowed them to take the lead of the DPi Drivers' Championship with 676 points while Blomqvist and Jarvis dropped from first to third. Bamber and Lynn advanced from sixth to fourth. Since it was the season's first points paying race, Keating, Huffaker, and Jensen led the LMP2 Drivers' Championship with 385 points. Since it was the season's first points paying race, Barbosa, Willsey, and Jakobsen led the LMP3 Drivers' Championship with 374 points. The final results of GTD Pro kept Campbell, Jaminet, and Nasr atop the Drivers' Championship while race winners Antonio García, Jordan Taylor, and Nicky Catsburg advanced from sixth to second. Bortolotti, Caldarelli, and Mapelli jumped from twelfth to fourth. McAleer and Skeen's second place finish allowed them to take the lead of the GTD Drivers' Championship with 672 points while Hardwick, Heylen, and Robichon dropped to third. Pérez Companc, Mann, and Vilander advanced from fourth to second. Cadillac and Ferrari took the lead in their respective Manufacturers' Championships while Porsche continued to top the GTD Pro Manufacturers' Championship. Pfaff Motorsports continued to top the GTD Pro Teams' Championship, while JDC-Miller MotorSports and Gilbert Korthoff Motorsports took the lead in their respective Teams' Championships. PR1/Mathiasen Motorsports and Sean Creech Motorsport became the leaders of their respective class Teams' Championships with ten rounds remaining.

=== Race results ===
Class winners are denoted in bold and ‡.

| Pos | Class | No. | Team | Drivers | Chassis | Laps | Time/Retired |
| Pos | Class | No. | Team | Drivers | Engine | Laps | Time/Retired |
|---|---|---|---|---|---|---|---|
| 1 | **DPi** | **02** | **(United States) Cadillac Racing** | **(New Zealand) Earl Bamber (Switzerland) Neel Jani (United Kingdom) Alex Lynn** | **Cadillac DPi-V.R** | **351** | **12:01:46.148‡** |
| 1 | **DPi** | **02** | **(United States) Cadillac Racing** | **(New Zealand) Earl Bamber (Switzerland) Neel Jani (United Kingdom) Alex Lynn** | **Cadillac 5.5 L V8** | **351** | **12:01:46.148‡** |
| 2 | DPi | 5 | (United States) JDC-Miller MotorSports | (France) Loïc Duval (France) Tristan Vautier (United Kingdom) Richard Westbrook | Cadillac DPi-V.R | 351 | +6.471 |
| 2 | DPi | 5 | (United States) JDC-Miller MotorSports | (France) Loïc Duval (France) Tristan Vautier (United Kingdom) Richard Westbrook | Cadillac 5.5 L V8 | 351 | +6.471 |
| 3 | DPi | 31 | (United States) Whelen Engineering Racing | (United Kingdom) Mike Conway (Brazil) Pipo Derani (United States) Tristan Nunez | Cadillac DPi-V.R | 351 | +14.616 |
| 3 | DPi | 31 | (United States) Whelen Engineering Racing | (United Kingdom) Mike Conway (Brazil) Pipo Derani (United States) Tristan Nunez | Cadillac 5.5 L V8 | 351 | +14.616 |
| 4 | DPi | 10 | (United States) Konica Minolta Acura ARX-05 | (Portugal) Filipe Albuquerque (United Kingdom) Will Stevens (United States) Ricky Taylor | Acura ARX-05 | 351 | +26.958 |
| 4 | DPi | 10 | (United States) Konica Minolta Acura ARX-05 | (Portugal) Filipe Albuquerque (United Kingdom) Will Stevens (United States) Ricky Taylor | Acura AR35TT 3.5 L Turbo V6 | 351 | +26.958 |
| 5 | DPi | 60 | (United States) Meyer Shank Racing w/ Curb-Agajanian | (United Kingdom) Tom Blomqvist (United Kingdom) Oliver Jarvis (Belgium) Stoffel Vandoorne | Acura ARX-05 | 351 | +27.621 |
| 5 | DPi | 60 | (United States) Meyer Shank Racing w/ Curb-Agajanian | (United Kingdom) Tom Blomqvist (United Kingdom) Oliver Jarvis (Belgium) Stoffel Vandoorne | Acura AR35TT 3.5 L Turbo V6 | 351 | +27.621 |
| 6 | DPi | 48 | (United States) Ally Cadillac Racing | (Japan) Kamui Kobayashi (Argentina) José María López (Germany) Mike Rockenfeller | Cadillac DPi-V.R | 346 | +5 Laps |
| 6 | DPi | 48 | (United States) Ally Cadillac Racing | (Japan) Kamui Kobayashi (Argentina) José María López (Germany) Mike Rockenfeller | Cadillac 5.5 L V8 | 346 | +5 Laps |
| 7 | **LMP2** | **52** | **(United States) PR1/Mathiasen Motorsports** | **(United States) Scott Huffaker (Denmark) Mikkel Jensen (United States) Ben Keating** | **Oreca 07** | **345** | **+6 Laps‡** |
| 7 | **LMP2** | **52** | **(United States) PR1/Mathiasen Motorsports** | **(United States) Scott Huffaker (Denmark) Mikkel Jensen (United States) Ben Keating** | **Gibson GK428 4.2 L V8** | **345** | **+6 Laps‡** |
| 8 | LMP2 | 29 | (Netherlands) Racing Team Nederland | (Netherlands) Frits van Eerd (Netherlands) Giedo van der Garde (United States) Dylan Murry | Oreca 07 | 344 | +7 Laps |
| 8 | LMP2 | 29 | (Netherlands) Racing Team Nederland | (Netherlands) Frits van Eerd (Netherlands) Giedo van der Garde (United States) Dylan Murry | Gibson GK428 4.2 L V8 | 344 | +7 Laps |
| 9 | LMP2 | 18 | (United States) Era Motorsport | (United Kingdom) Ryan Dalziel (United States) Dwight Merriman (United Kingdom) Kyle Tilley | Oreca 07 | 344 | +7 Laps |
| 9 | LMP2 | 18 | (United States) Era Motorsport | (United Kingdom) Ryan Dalziel (United States) Dwight Merriman (United Kingdom) Kyle Tilley | Gibson GK428 4.2 L V8 | 344 | +7 Laps |
| 10 | LMP2 | 11 | (United States) PR1/Mathiasen Motorsports | (United States) Jonathan Bomarito (United States) Josh Pierson (United States) Steven Thomas | Oreca 07 | 343 | +8 Laps |
| 10 | LMP2 | 11 | (United States) PR1/Mathiasen Motorsports | (United States) Jonathan Bomarito (United States) Josh Pierson (United States) Steven Thomas | Gibson GK428 4.2 L V8 | 343 | +8 Laps |
| 11 | LMP2 | 22 | (United Kingdom) United Autosports | (United States) James McGuire (United Kingdom) Guy Smith (United Kingdom) Duncan Tappy | Oreca 07 | 342 | +9 Laps |
| 11 | LMP2 | 22 | (United Kingdom) United Autosports | (United States) James McGuire (United Kingdom) Guy Smith (United Kingdom) Duncan Tappy | Gibson GK428 4.2 L V8 | 342 | +9 Laps |
| 12 | LMP2 | 20 | (Denmark) High Class Racing | (Denmark) Dennis Andersen (Denmark) Anders Fjordbach (Switzerland) Fabio Scherer | Oreca 07 | 340 | +11 Laps |
| 12 | LMP2 | 20 | (Denmark) High Class Racing | (Denmark) Dennis Andersen (Denmark) Anders Fjordbach (Switzerland) Fabio Scherer | Gibson GK428 4.2 L V8 | 340 | +11 Laps |
| 13 | **LMP3** | **33** | **(United States) Sean Creech Motorsport** | **(Portugal) João Barbosa (Denmark) Malthe Jakobsen (United States) Lance Willsey** | **Ligier JS P320** | **331** | **+20 Laps‡** |
| 13 | **LMP3** | **33** | **(United States) Sean Creech Motorsport** | **(Portugal) João Barbosa (Denmark) Malthe Jakobsen (United States) Lance Willsey** | **Nissan VK56DE 5.6 L V8** | **331** | **+20 Laps‡** |
| 14 | LMP3 | 30 | (United States) Jr III Racing | (United States) Ari Balogh (United States) Dakota Dickerson (Canada) Garett Grist | Ligier JS P320 | 331 | +20 Laps |
| 14 | LMP3 | 30 | (United States) Jr III Racing | (United States) Ari Balogh (United States) Dakota Dickerson (Canada) Garett Grist | Nissan VK56DE 5.6 L V8 | 331 | +20 Laps |
| 15 | LMP3 | 38 | (United States) Performance Tech Motorsports | (United States) Dan Goldburg (Sweden) Rasmus Lindh (Australia) Cameron Shields | Ligier JS P320 | 323 | +28 Laps |
| 15 | LMP3 | 38 | (United States) Performance Tech Motorsports | (United States) Dan Goldburg (Sweden) Rasmus Lindh (Australia) Cameron Shields | Nissan VK56DE 5.6 L V8 | 323 | +28 Laps |
| 16 | **GTD; Pro** | **3** | **(United States) Corvette Racing** | **(Netherlands) Nicky Catsburg (Spain) Antonio García (United States) Jordan Taylor** | **Chevrolet Corvette C8.R GTD** | **323** | **+28 Laps‡** |
| 16 | **GTD; Pro** | **3** | **(United States) Corvette Racing** | **(Netherlands) Nicky Catsburg (Spain) Antonio García (United States) Jordan Taylor** | **Chevrolet 5.5 L V8** | **323** | **+28 Laps‡** |
| 17 | GTD; Pro | 63 | (United States) TR3 Racing | (Italy) Mirko Bortolotti (Italy) Andrea Caldarelli (Italy) Marco Mapelli | Lamborghini Huracán GT3 Evo | 323 | +28 Laps |
| 17 | GTD; Pro | 63 | (United States) TR3 Racing | (Italy) Mirko Bortolotti (Italy) Andrea Caldarelli (Italy) Marco Mapelli | Lamborghini 5.2 L V10 | 323 | +28 Laps |
| 18 | GTD; Pro | 97 | (United States) WeatherTech Racing | (Germany) Maro Engel (France) Jules Gounon (United States) Cooper MacNeil | Mercedes-AMG GT3 Evo | 322 | +29 Laps |
| 18 | GTD; Pro | 97 | (United States) WeatherTech Racing | (Germany) Maro Engel (France) Jules Gounon (United States) Cooper MacNeil | Mercedes-AMG M159 6.2 L V8 | 322 | +29 Laps |
| 19 | GTD; Pro | 24 | (United States) BMW Team RLL | (Austria) Philipp Eng (Germany) Marco Wittmann (United Kingdom) Nick Yelloly | BMW M4 GT3 | 322 | +29 Laps |
| 19 | GTD; Pro | 24 | (United States) BMW Team RLL | (Austria) Philipp Eng (Germany) Marco Wittmann (United Kingdom) Nick Yelloly | BMW S58B30T0 3.0 L Twin Turbo I6 | 322 | +29 Laps |
| 20 | GTD; Pro | 9 | (Canada) Pfaff Motorsports | (Australia) Matt Campbell (France) Mathieu Jaminet (Brazil) Felipe Nasr | Porsche 911 GT3 R | 322 | +29 Laps |
| 20 | GTD; Pro | 9 | (Canada) Pfaff Motorsports | (Australia) Matt Campbell (France) Mathieu Jaminet (Brazil) Felipe Nasr | Porsche 4.0 L Flat-6 | 322 | +29 Laps |
| 21 | GTD; Pro | 79 | (United States) WeatherTech Racing | (France) Julien Andlauer (United States) Cooper MacNeil (Belgium) Alessio Picariello | Porsche 911 GT3 R | 322 | +29 Laps |
| 21 | GTD; Pro | 79 | (United States) WeatherTech Racing | (France) Julien Andlauer (United States) Cooper MacNeil (Belgium) Alessio Picariello | Porsche 4.0 L Flat-6 | 322 | +29 Laps |
| 22 | **GTD** | **47** | **(Italy) Cetilar Racing** | **(Italy) Antonio Fuoco (Italy) Roberto Lacorte (Italy) Giorgio Sernagiotto** | **Ferrari 488 GT3 Evo 2020** | **321** | **+30 Laps‡** |
| 22 | **GTD** | **47** | **(Italy) Cetilar Racing** | **(Italy) Antonio Fuoco (Italy) Roberto Lacorte (Italy) Giorgio Sernagiotto** | **Ferrari F154CB 3.9 L Turbo V8** | **321** | **+30 Laps‡** |
| 23 | GTD | 32 | (United States) Gilbert Korthoff Motorsports | (Spain) Daniel Juncadella (United Kingdom) Stevan McAleer (United States) Mike Skeen | Mercedes-AMG GT3 Evo | 321 | +30 Laps |
| 23 | GTD | 32 | (United States) Gilbert Korthoff Motorsports | (Spain) Daniel Juncadella (United Kingdom) Stevan McAleer (United States) Mike Skeen | Mercedes-AMG M159 6.2 L V8 | 321 | +30 Laps |
| 24 | GTD | 21 | (Italy) AF Corse | (Argentina) Luís Pérez Companc (United Kingdom) Simon Mann (Finland) Toni Vilander | Ferrari 488 GT3 Evo 2020 | 321 | +30 Laps |
| 24 | GTD | 21 | (Italy) AF Corse | (Argentina) Luís Pérez Companc (United Kingdom) Simon Mann (Finland) Toni Vilander | Ferrari F154CB 3.9 L Turbo V8 | 321 | +30 Laps |
| 25 | GTD | 96 | (United States) Turner Motorsport | (United States) Bill Auberlen (United States) Michael Dinan (United States) Robby Foley | BMW M4 GT3 | 321 | +30 Laps |
| 25 | GTD | 96 | (United States) Turner Motorsport | (United States) Bill Auberlen (United States) Michael Dinan (United States) Robby Foley | BMW S58B30T0 3.0 L Twin Turbo I6 | 321 | +30 Laps |
| 26 DNF | GTD; Pro | 14 | (United States) Vasser Sullivan Racing | (United Kingdom) Ben Barnicoat (United Kingdom) Jack Hawksworth (United States) Aaron Telitz | Lexus RC F GT3 | 320 | Fuel |
| 26 DNF | GTD; Pro | 14 | (United States) Vasser Sullivan Racing | (United Kingdom) Ben Barnicoat (United Kingdom) Jack Hawksworth (United States) Aaron Telitz | Toyota 2UR 5.0 L V8 | 320 | Fuel |
| 27 | GTD; Pro | 93 | (United States) WTR - Racers Edge Motorsports | (United States) Ashton Harrison-Henry (Canada) Kyle Marcelli (United States) Tom Long | Acura NSX GT3 Evo22 | 320 | +31 Laps |
| 27 | GTD; Pro | 93 | (United States) WTR - Racers Edge Motorsports | (United States) Ashton Harrison-Henry (Canada) Kyle Marcelli (United States) Tom Long | Acura 3.5 L Turbo V6 | 320 | +31 Laps |
| 28 | GTD | 70 | (United Kingdom) Inception Racing | (United States) Brendan Iribe (United Kingdom) Ollie Millroy (South Africa) Jordan Pepper | McLaren 720S GT3 | 320 | +31 Laps |
| 28 | GTD | 70 | (United Kingdom) Inception Racing | (United States) Brendan Iribe (United Kingdom) Ollie Millroy (South Africa) Jordan Pepper | McLaren M840T 4.0 L Turbo V8 | 320 | +31 Laps |
| 29 | GTD | 44 | (United States) Magnus Racing | (United States) Andy Lally (United States) John Potter (United States) Spencer Pumpelly | Aston Martin Vantage AMR GT3 | 319 | +32 Laps |
| 29 | GTD | 44 | (United States) Magnus Racing | (United States) Andy Lally (United States) John Potter (United States) Spencer Pumpelly | Aston Martin 4.0 L Turbo V8 | 319 | +32 Laps |
| 30 | LMP3 | 13 | (Canada) AWA | (Canada) Orey Fidani (Germany) Lars Kern (Canada) Kuno Wittmer | Duqueine M30 - D08 | 319 | +32 Laps |
| 30 | LMP3 | 13 | (Canada) AWA | (Canada) Orey Fidani (Germany) Lars Kern (Canada) Kuno Wittmer | Nissan VK56DE 5.6 L V8 | 319 | +32 Laps |
| 31 | GTD; Pro | 62 | (United States) Risi Competizione | (Italy) Eddie Cheever III (Italy) Davide Rigon (Brazil) Daniel Serra | Ferrari 488 GT3 Evo 2020 | 318 | +33 Laps |
| 31 | GTD; Pro | 62 | (United States) Risi Competizione | (Italy) Eddie Cheever III (Italy) Davide Rigon (Brazil) Daniel Serra | Ferrari F154CB 3.9 L Turbo V8 | 318 | +33 Laps |
| 32 | GTD | 12 | (United States) Vasser Sullivan Racing | (Australia) Scott Andrews (United States) Richard Heistand (United States) Frankie Montecalvo | Lexus RC F GT3 | 318 | +33 Laps |
| 32 | GTD | 12 | (United States) Vasser Sullivan Racing | (Australia) Scott Andrews (United States) Richard Heistand (United States) Frankie Montecalvo | Toyota 2UR 5.0 L V8 | 318 | +33 Laps |
| 33 | GTD | 99 | (United States) Team Hardpoint | (United States) Rob Ferriol (United Kingdom) Katherine Legge (United Kingdom) Stefan Wilson | Porsche 911 GT3 R | 318 | +33 Laps |
| 33 | GTD | 99 | (United States) Team Hardpoint | (United States) Rob Ferriol (United Kingdom) Katherine Legge (United Kingdom) Stefan Wilson | Porsche 4.0 L Flat-6 | 318 | +33 Laps |
| 34 | LMP3 | 54 | (United States) CORE Autosport | (United States) Jon Bennett (United States) Colin Braun (United States) George Kurtz | Ligier JS P320 | 308 | +43 Laps |
| 34 | LMP3 | 54 | (United States) CORE Autosport | (United States) Jon Bennett (United States) Colin Braun (United States) George Kurtz | Nissan VK56DE 5.6 L V8 | 308 | +43 Laps |
| 35 | DPi | 01 | (United States) Cadillac Racing | (France) Sébastien Bourdais (United States) Ryan Hunter-Reay (Netherlands) Renger van der Zande | Cadillac DPi-V.R | 307 | +44 Laps |
| 35 | DPi | 01 | (United States) Cadillac Racing | (France) Sébastien Bourdais (United States) Ryan Hunter-Reay (Netherlands) Renger van der Zande | Cadillac 5.5 L V8 | 307 | +44 Laps |
| 36 | GTD | 28 | (United States) Alegra Motorsports | (Germany) Maximilian Götz (Canada) Daniel Morad (United States) Michael de Quesada | Mercedes-AMG GT3 Evo | 306 | +45 Laps |
| 36 | GTD | 28 | (United States) Alegra Motorsports | (Germany) Maximilian Götz (Canada) Daniel Morad (United States) Michael de Quesada | Mercedes-AMG M159 6.2 L V8 | 306 | +45 Laps |
| 37 | GTD | 16 | (United States) Wright Motorsports | (United States) Ryan Hardwick (Belgium) Jan Heylen (Canada) Zacharie Robichon | Porsche 911 GT3 R | 305 | +46 Laps |
| 37 | GTD | 16 | (United States) Wright Motorsports | (United States) Ryan Hardwick (Belgium) Jan Heylen (Canada) Zacharie Robichon | Porsche 4.0 L Flat-6 | 305 | +46 Laps |
| 38 | GTD | 66 | (United States) Gradient Racing | (United Kingdom) Till Bechtolsheimer (Germany) Mario Farnbacher (Barbados) Kyffin Simpson | Acura NSX GT3 Evo22 | 305 | +46 Laps |
| 38 | GTD | 66 | (United States) Gradient Racing | (United Kingdom) Till Bechtolsheimer (Germany) Mario Farnbacher (Barbados) Kyffin Simpson | Acura 3.5 L Turbo V6 | 305 | +46 Laps |
| 39 | GTD | 57 | (United States) Winward Racing | (Germany) Marvin Dienst (United Kingdom) Philip Ellis (United States) Russell Ward | Mercedes-AMG GT3 Evo | 287 | +64 Laps |
| 39 | GTD | 57 | (United States) Winward Racing | (Germany) Marvin Dienst (United Kingdom) Philip Ellis (United States) Russell Ward | Mercedes-AMG M159 6.2 L V8 | 287 | +64 Laps |
| 40 | GTD | 39 | (United States) CarBahn with Peregrine Racing | (United States) Corey Lewis (United States) Robert Megennis (United States) Jeff Westphal | Lamborghini Huracán GT3 Evo | 287 | +64 Laps |
| 40 | GTD | 39 | (United States) CarBahn with Peregrine Racing | (United States) Corey Lewis (United States) Robert Megennis (United States) Jeff Westphal | Lamborghini 5.2 L V10 | 287 | +64 Laps |
| 41 DNF | GTD | 59 | (United States) Crucial Motorsports | (United States) Patrick Gallagher (United States) Paul Holton (United States) Jon Miller | McLaren 720S GT3 | 276 | Mechanical |
| 41 DNF | GTD | 59 | (United States) Crucial Motorsports | (United States) Patrick Gallagher (United States) Paul Holton (United States) Jon Miller | McLaren M840T 4.0 L Turbo V8 | 276 | Mechanical |
| 42 | LMP3 | 40 | (United States) FastMD Racing | (United States) Todd Archer (United States) Max Hanratty (Canada) James Vance | Duqueine M30 - D08 | 262 | +89 Laps |
| 42 | LMP3 | 40 | (United States) FastMD Racing | (United States) Todd Archer (United States) Max Hanratty (Canada) James Vance | Nissan VK56DE 5.6 L V8 | 262 | +89 Laps |
| 43 | GTD | 27 | (United States) Heart of Racing Team | (Canada) Roman De Angelis (United Kingdom) Tom Gamble (United Kingdom) Ian James | Aston Martin Vantage AMR GT3 | 256 | +95 Laps |
| 43 | GTD | 27 | (United States) Heart of Racing Team | (Canada) Roman De Angelis (United Kingdom) Tom Gamble (United Kingdom) Ian James | Aston Martin 4.0 L Turbo V8 | 256 | +95 Laps |
| 44 | GTD | 1 | (United States) Paul Miller Racing | (Sweden) Erik Johansson (United States) Bryan Sellers (United States) Madison Snow | BMW M4 GT3 | 256 | +95 Laps |
| 44 | GTD | 1 | (United States) Paul Miller Racing | (Sweden) Erik Johansson (United States) Bryan Sellers (United States) Madison Snow | BMW S58B30T0 3.0 L Twin Turbo I6 | 256 | +95 Laps |
| 45 | GTD; Pro | 25 | (United States) BMW Team RLL | (United States) Connor De Phillippi (United States) John Edwards (Brazil) Augusto Farfus | BMW M4 GT3 | 246 | +105 Laps |
| 45 | GTD; Pro | 25 | (United States) BMW Team RLL | (United States) Connor De Phillippi (United States) John Edwards (Brazil) Augusto Farfus | BMW S58B30T0 3.0 L Twin Turbo I6 | 246 | +105 Laps |
| 46 DNF | LMP3 | 74 | (United States) Riley Motorsports | (Netherlands) Kay van Berlo (Brazil) Felipe Fraga (United States) Gar Robinson | Ligier JS P320 | 232 | Radiator damage |
| 46 DNF | LMP3 | 74 | (United States) Riley Motorsports | (Netherlands) Kay van Berlo (Brazil) Felipe Fraga (United States) Gar Robinson | Nissan VK56DE 5.6 L V8 | 232 | Radiator damage |
| 47 DNF | GTD; Pro | 23 | (United States) Heart of Racing Team | (United Kingdom) Ross Gunn (Belgium) Maxime Martin (Spain) Alex Riberas | Aston Martin Vantage AMR GT3 | 230 | Brakes |
| 47 DNF | GTD; Pro | 23 | (United States) Heart of Racing Team | (United Kingdom) Ross Gunn (Belgium) Maxime Martin (Spain) Alex Riberas | Aston Martin 4.0 L Turbo V8 | 230 | Brakes |
| 48 DNF | LMP2 | 8 | (United States) Tower Motorsport | (Angola) Rui Andrade (Switzerland) Louis Delétraz (Canada) John Farano | Oreca 07 | 220 | Contact damage |
| 48 DNF | LMP2 | 8 | (United States) Tower Motorsport | (Angola) Rui Andrade (Switzerland) Louis Delétraz (Canada) John Farano | Gibson GK428 4.2 L V8 | 220 | Contact damage |
| 49 DNF | LMP3 | 7 | (United States) Forty7 Motorsports | (United Kingdom) Matthew Bell (United States) Mark Kvamme (Canada) Anthony Mantella | Duqueine M30 - D08 | 204 | Mechanical |
| 49 DNF | LMP3 | 7 | (United States) Forty7 Motorsports | (United Kingdom) Matthew Bell (United States) Mark Kvamme (Canada) Anthony Mantella | Nissan VK56DE 5.6 L V8 | 204 | Mechanical |
| 50 DNF | LMP3 | 6 | (Belgium) Mühlner Motorsports America | (United States) Harry Gottsacker (United States) Alec Udell (Belgium) Ugo de Wilde | Duqueine M30 - D08 | 128 | Accident |
| 50 DNF | LMP3 | 6 | (Belgium) Mühlner Motorsports America | (United States) Harry Gottsacker (United States) Alec Udell (Belgium) Ugo de Wilde | Nissan VK56DE 5.6 L V8 | 128 | Accident |
| 51 DNF | GTD | 42 | (United States) NTE Sport/SSR | (United States) Jaden Conwright (Guatemala) Mateo Llarena (United States) Don Yount | Lamborghini Huracán GT3 Evo | 105 | Contact damage |
| 51 DNF | GTD | 42 | (United States) NTE Sport/SSR | (United States) Jaden Conwright (Guatemala) Mateo Llarena (United States) Don Yount | Lamborghini 5.2 L V10 | 105 | Contact damage |
| 52 DNF | LMP2 | 81 | (United States) DragonSpeed USA | (Sweden) Henrik Hedman (Colombia) Juan Pablo Montoya (Colombia) Sebastián Montoya | Oreca 07 | 83 | Accident |
| 52 DNF | LMP2 | 81 | (United States) DragonSpeed USA | (Sweden) Henrik Hedman (Colombia) Juan Pablo Montoya (Colombia) Sebastián Montoya | Gibson GK428 4.2 L V8 | 83 | Accident |
| 53 DNF | LMP3 | 36 | (United States) Andretti Autosport | (United States) Jarett Andretti (Australia) Josh Burdon (Colombia) Gabby Chaves | Ligier JS P320 | 1 | Engine |
| 53 DNF | LMP3 | 36 | (United States) Andretti Autosport | (United States) Jarett Andretti (Australia) Josh Burdon (Colombia) Gabby Chaves | Nissan VK56DE 5.6 L V8 | 1 | Engine |

== Standings after the race ==
DPi Drivers' Championship standings
| Pos. | +/– | Driver | Points |
|---|---|---|---|
| 1 | 2 | (France) Tristan Vautier (United Kingdom) Richard Westbrook (France) Loïc Duval | 676 |
| 2 | | (Portugal) Filipe Albuquerque (United States) Ricky Taylor (United Kingdom) Will Stevens | 665 |
| 3 | 2 | (United Kingdom) Tom Blomqvist (United Kingdom) Oliver Jarvis | 663 |
| 4 | 2 | (United Kingdom) Alex Lynn (New Zealand) Earl Bamber | 653 |
| 5 | 1 | (Brazil) Pipo Derani (United States) Tristan Nunez (United Kingdom) Mike Conway | 636 |

LMP2 Drivers' Championship standings
| Pos. | Driver | Points |
|---|---|---|
| 1 | (United States) Ben Keating (United States) Scott Huffaker (Denmark) Mikkel Jensen | 385 |
| 2 | (Netherlands) Frits van Eerd (Netherlands) Giedo van der Garde | 348 |
| 3 | (United Kingdom) Ryan Dalziel (United States) Dwight Merriman (United Kingdom) Kyle Tilley | 330 |
| 4 | (United States) Steven Thomas (United States) Josh Pierson (United States) Jonathan Bomarito | 303 |
| 5 | (United States) James McGuire (United Kingdom) Guy Smith (United Kingdom) Duncan Tappy | 284 |

LMP3 Drivers' Championship standings
| Pos. | Driver | Points |
|---|---|---|
| 1 | (Portugal) João Barbosa (United States) Lance Willsey (Denmark) Malthe Jakobsen | 374 |
| 2 | (United States) Ari Balogh (United States) Dakota Dickerson (Canada) Garett Grist | 343 |
| 3 | (United States) Daniel Goldburg (Sweden) Rasmus Lindh (Australia) Cameron Shields | 326 |
| 4 | (Germany) Lars Kern (Canada) Kuno Wittmer (Canada) Orey Fidani | 302 |
| 5 | (United States) Jon Bennett (United States) Colin Braun (United States) George Kurtz | 285 |

GTD Pro Drivers' Championship standings
| Pos. | +/– | Driver | Points |
|---|---|---|---|
| 1 | | (Australia) Matt Campbell (France) Mathieu Jaminet (Brazil) Felipe Nasr | 668 |
| 2 | 4 | (Spain) Antonio García (United States) Jordan Taylor (Netherlands) Nicky Catsburg | 655 |
| 3 | 1 | (Italy) Davide Rigon (Brazil) Daniel Serra | 595 |
| 4 | 8 | (Italy) Mirko Bortolotti (Italy) Andrea Caldarelli (Italy) Marco Mapelli | 577 |
| 5 | 1 | (United Kingdom) Ben Barnicoat (United Kingdom) Jack Hawksworth | 571 |

GTD Drivers' Championship standings
| Pos. | +/– | Driver | Points |
|---|---|---|---|
| 1 | 2 | (United Kingdom) Stevan McAleer (United States) Mike Skeen | 672 |
| 2 | 2 | (Argentina) Luís Pérez Companc (United Kingdom) Simon Mann (Finland) Toni Vilander | 619 |
| 3 | 2 | (United States) Ryan Hardwick (Belgium) Jan Heylen (Canada) Zacharie Robichon | 615 |
| 4 | 2 | (United States) Andy Lally (United States) John Potter (United States) Spencer Pumpelly | 609 |
| 5 | 2 | (Australia) Scott Andrews | 587 |

- Note: Only the top five positions are included for all sets of standings.

DPi Teams' Championship standings
| Pos. | +/– | Team | Points |
|---|---|---|---|
| 1 | 2 | (United States) #5 JDC-Miller MotorSports | 676 |
| 2 | | (United States) #10 WTR - Konica Minolta Acura | 665 |
| 3 | 2 | (United States) #60 Meyer Shank Racing w/ Curb-Agajanian | 663 |
| 4 | 2 | (United States) #02 Cadillac Racing | 653 |
| 5 | 1 | (United States) #31 Whelen Engineering Racing | 636 |

LMP2 Teams' Championship standings
| Pos. | Team | Points |
|---|---|---|
| 1 | (United States) #52 PR1/Mathiasen Motorsports | 385 |
| 2 | (Netherlands) #29 Racing Team Nederland | 348 |
| 3 | (United States) #18 Era Motorsport | 330 |
| 4 | (United States) #11 PR1/Mathiasen Motorsports | 303 |
| 5 | (United Kingdom) #22 United Autosports | 284 |

LMP3 Teams' Championship standings
| Pos. | Team | Points |
|---|---|---|
| 1 | (United States) #33 Sean Creech Motorsport | 374 |
| 2 | (United States) #30 Jr III Motorsports | 343 |
| 3 | (United States) #38 Performance Tech Motorsports | 326 |
| 4 | (Canada) #13 AWA | 302 |
| 5 | (United States) #54 CORE Autosport | 285 |

GTD Pro Teams' Championship standings
| Pos. | +/– | Team | Points |
|---|---|---|---|
| 1 | | (Canada) #9 Pfaff Motorsports | 668 |
| 2 | 4 | (United States) #3 Corvette Racing | 655 |
| 3 | 1 | (United States) #62 Risi Competizione | 595 |
| 4 | 7 | (United States) #63 TR3 Racing | 577 |
| 5 | 1 | (United States) #14 Vasser Sullivan Racing | 571 |

GTD Teams' Championship standings
| Pos. | +/– | Team | Points |
|---|---|---|---|
| 1 | 2 | (United States) #32 Gilbert Korthoff Motorsports | 672 |
| 2 | 2 | (Italy) #21 AF Corse | 619 |
| 3 | 2 | (United States) #16 Wright Motorsports | 615 |
| 4 | 2 | (United States) #44 Magnus Racing | 609 |
| 5 | 10 | (Italy) #47 Cetilar Racing | 567 |

- Note: Only the top five positions are included for all sets of standings.

DPi Manufacturers' Championship standings
| Pos. | +/– | Manufacturer | Points |
|---|---|---|---|
| 1 | 1 | (United States) Cadillac | 737 |
| 2 | 1 | (Japan) Acura | 737 |

GTD Pro Manufacturers' Championship standings
| Pos. | +/– | Manufacturer | Points |
|---|---|---|---|
| 1 | | (Germany) Porsche | 668 |
| 2 | 3 | (United States) Chevrolet | 665 |
| 3 | 1 | (Germany) Mercedes-AMG | 632 |
| 4 | 2 | (Italy) Lamborghini | 627 |
| 5 | 3 | (Italy) Ferrari | 609 |

GTD Manufacturers' Championship standings
| Pos. | +/– | Manufacturer | Points |
|---|---|---|---|
| 1 | 3 | (Italy) Ferrari | 684 |
| 2 | 1 | (Germany) Mercedes-AMG | 683 |
| 3 | 2 | (Germany) Porsche | 650 |
| 4 | 2 | (United Kingdom) Aston Martin | 628 |
| 5 | | (United Kingdom) McLaren | 598 |

- Note: Only the top five positions are included for all sets of standings.

IMSA SportsCar Championship
| Previous race: 2022 24 Hours of Daytona | 2022 season | Next race: 2022 Grand Prix of Long Beach |
