= 2016 Australian Formula 3 Premier Series =

Motor racing competition

Seasons
- ← 2015 2017 →

The 2016 Australian Formula 3 Premier Series is an Australian motor racing competition for cars constructed in accordance with FIA Formula 3 regulations. It is sanctioned by the Confederation of Australian Motor Sport (CAMS) as an Authorised Series, with Formula 3 Management Pty Ltd appointed as the Category Manager. The series began on 2 April at Sandown Raceway and will end on 13 November at Sydney Motorsport Park after seven triple-header rounds across three states. This was the first Australian Formula 3 Premier Series to be contested, with the Australian Formula 3 Championship having been discontinued at the end of 2015.

== Teams and drivers ==
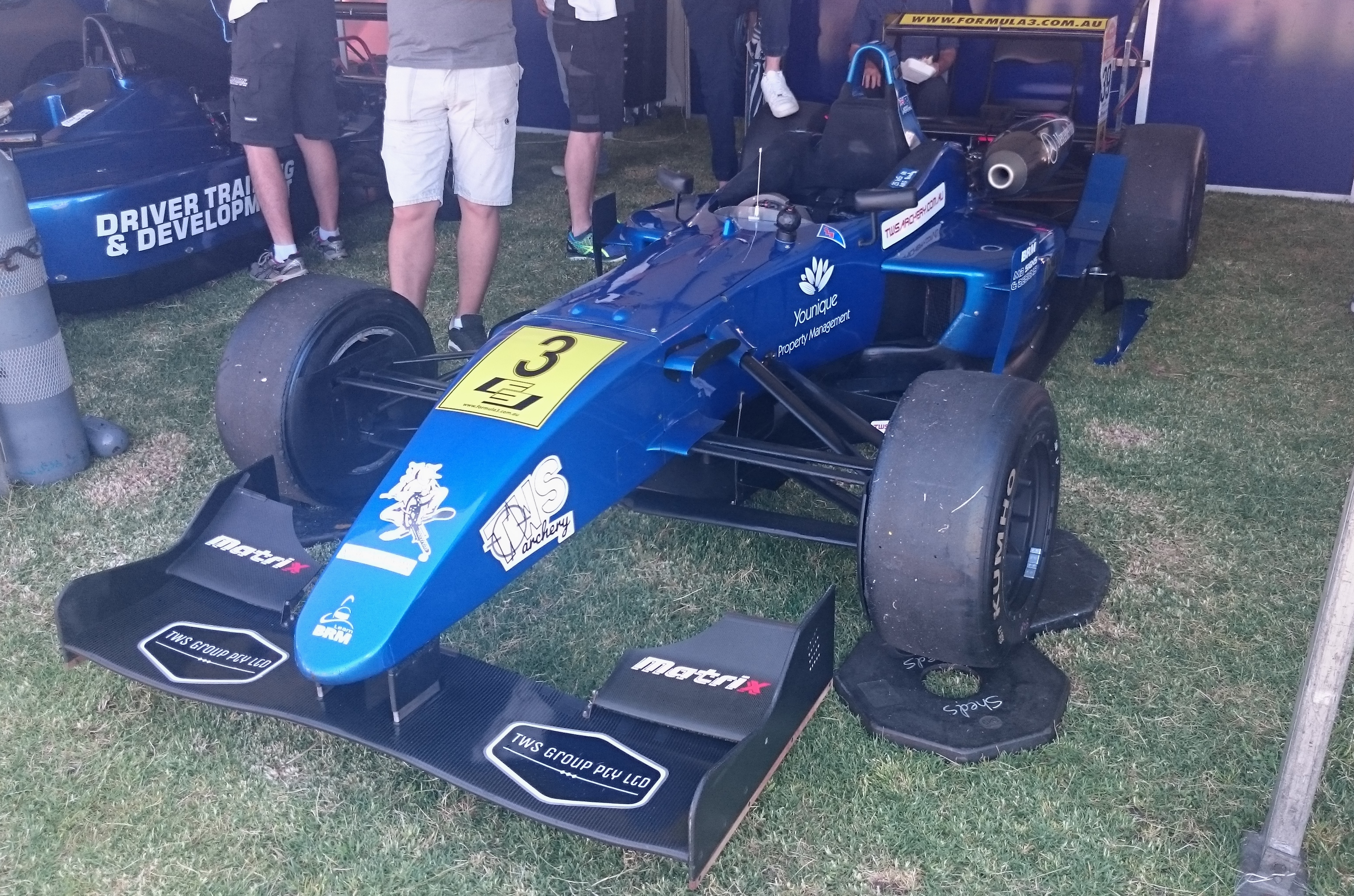
Trent Shirvington placed fourth in the Premier Class driving a Mygale M11

The following teams and drivers contested the 2016 Australian Formula 3 Premier Series. All teams and drivers were Australian-registered.

Team	Chassis	Engine	No.	Driver	Class	Rounds
Gilmour Racing	Dallara F311	HWA-Mercedes-Benz	1	Jon Collins	P	7
Gilmour Racing	Dallara F311	HWA-Mercedes-Benz	17	Christopher Anthony	P	1-6
Gilmour Racing	Mygale M11	HWA-Mercedes-Benz	23	Chris Gilmour	P	5
Gilmour Racing	Dallara F307	HWA-Mercedes-Benz	73	Cameron Shields	P	6-7
Gilmour Racing	Dallara F307	HWA-Mercedes-Benz	73	Cameron Shields	N	1-5
Team BRM	Mygale M11	HWA-Mercedes-Benz	3	Trent Shirvington	P	1-2,4
R-Tek Motorsport	Dallara F307	Spiess-Opel	6	Roman Krumins	N	5-7
R-Tek Motorsport	Dallara F307	Spiess-Opel	7	Nathan Kumar	N	1-7
R-Tek Motorsport	Dallara F311	HWA-Mercedes-Benz	8	Roland Legge	P	1-7
Wiltec Wilson Team Racing	Dallara F304	Spiess-Opel	13	Shane Wilson	K	4-6
Wiltec Wilson Team Racing	Dallara F307	Spiess-Opel	27	Shane Wilson	N	7
Ross McAlpine	Dallara F304	Renault-Sodemo	81	Ross McAlpine	K	1, 3-7
Alpine Motorsport	Dallara F307	HWA-Mercedes-Benz	88	Tim Macrow	P	1-7
Ricky Capo Racing	Dallara F311	Mugen-Honda	92	Ricky Capo	P	4

Icon	Class
P	Premier Class
N	National Class
K	Kumho Class

=== Classes ===
Competing cars are nominated into one of four classes:

- Premier Class – for automobiles constructed in accordance with the FIA Formula 3 regulations that applied in the year of manufacture between 1 January 2005 and 31 December 2011.
- National Class – for automobiles constructed in accordance with the FIA Formula 3 regulations that applied in the year of manufacture between 1 January 1999 and 31 December 2007.
- Kumho Cup Class – for automobiles constructed in accordance with the FIA Formula 3 regulations that applied in the year of manufacture between 1 January 1999 and 31 December 2004.
- Invitational Class.

== Race calendar and results ==
Event		Circuit	Date	Pole position	Fastest lap	Race winner	Round winners		
Event		Circuit	Date	Pole position	Fastest lap	Race winner	Premier Class	National Class	Kumho Cup
1	R1	Sandown Raceway	2 April	Tim Macrow	Tim Macrow	Tim Macrow	Tim Macrow	Cameron Shields	Ross McAlpine
1	R2	Sandown Raceway	3 April		Roland Legge	Christopher Anthony	Tim Macrow	Cameron Shields	Ross McAlpine
1	R3	Sandown Raceway	3 April	Tim Macrow	Christopher Anthony	Tim Macrow	Tim Macrow	Cameron Shields	Ross McAlpine
2	R1	Phillip Island Grand Prix Circuit	28 May	Tim Macrow	Christopher Anthony	Tim Macrow	Tim Macrow	Cameron Shields	No competitors
2	R2	Phillip Island Grand Prix Circuit	29 May		Tim Macrow	Tim Macrow	Tim Macrow	Cameron Shields	No competitors
2	R3	Phillip Island Grand Prix Circuit	29 May	Tim Macrow	Tim Macrow	Tim Macrow	Tim Macrow	Cameron Shields	No competitors
3	R1	Winton Motor Raceway	11 June	Tim Macrow	Christopher Anthony	Tim Macrow	Tim Macrow	Cameron Shields	Ross McAlpine
3	R2	Winton Motor Raceway	12 June		Christopher Anthony	Tim Macrow	Tim Macrow	Cameron Shields	Ross McAlpine
3	R3	Winton Motor Raceway	12 June	Tim Macrow	Christopher Anthony	Tim Macrow	Tim Macrow	Cameron Shields	Ross McAlpine
4	R1	Sydney Motorsport Park	2 July	Tim Macrow	Tim Macrow	Tim Macrow	Tim Macrow	Cameron Shields	Shane Wilson
4	R2	Sydney Motorsport Park	3 July		Tim Macrow	Christopher Anthony	Tim Macrow	Cameron Shields	Shane Wilson
4	R3	Sydney Motorsport Park	3 July	Tim Macrow	Tim Macrow	Tim Macrow	Tim Macrow	Cameron Shields	Shane Wilson
5	R1	Queensland Raceway	30 July	Cameron Shields	Roland Legge	Cameron Shields	Roland Legge	Cameron Shields	Shane Wilson
5	R2	Queensland Raceway	31 July		Christopher Anthony	Christopher Anthony	Roland Legge	Cameron Shields	Shane Wilson
5	R3	Queensland Raceway	31 July	Cameron Shields	Cameron Shields	Tim Macrow	Roland Legge	Cameron Shields	Shane Wilson
6	R1	Phillip Island Grand Prix Circuit	10 September	Tim Macrow	Tim Macrow	Tim Macrow	Tim Macrow	Nathan Kumar	Shane Wilson
6	R2	Phillip Island Grand Prix Circuit	11 September		Tim Macrow	Tim Macrow	Tim Macrow	Nathan Kumar	Shane Wilson
6	R3	Phillip Island Grand Prix Circuit	11 September	Tim Macrow	Tim Macrow	Tim Macrow	Tim Macrow	Nathan Kumar	Shane Wilson
7	R1	Sydney Motorsport Park	12 November	Tim Macrow	Tim Macrow	Tim Macrow	Tim Macrow	Shane Wilson	Ross McAlpine
7	R2	Sydney Motorsport Park	13 November		Cameron Shields	Tim Macrow	Tim Macrow	Shane Wilson	Ross McAlpine
7	R3	Sydney Motorsport Park	13 November	Tim Macrow	Tim Macrow	Tim Macrow	Tim Macrow	Shane Wilson	Ross McAlpine

== Series standings ==
Premier Class
Pos	Driver	Car	Team	Pts
1	Tim Macrow	Dallara F307 Mercedes-Benz	Alpine Motorsport	296
2	Christopher Anthony	Dallara F311 Mercedes-Benz	Gilmour Racing	201
3	Roland Legge	Dallara F311 Mercedes-Benz	R-Tek Motorsport	168
4	Trent Shirvington	Mygale M11 Mercedes-Benz	Team BRM	76
5	Cameron Shields	Dallara F307 Mercedes-Benz	Gilmour Racing	63
6	Jon Collins	Dallara F311 Mercedes-Benz	Gilmour Racing	30
7	Chris Gilmour	Mygale M11 Mercedes-Benz	Gilmour Racing	27
8	Ricky Capo	Dallara F311 Mugen-Honda	Ricky Capo Racing	15
National Class
Pos	Driver	Car	Team	Pts
1	Cameron Shields	Dallara F307 Mercedes-Benz	Gilmour Racing	213
2	Nathan Kumar	Dallara F307 Spiess-Opel	R-Tek Motorsport	196
3	Roman Krumins	Dallara F307 Spiess-Opel	R-Tek Motorsport	76
4	Shane Wilson	Dallara F307 Spiess-Opel	Wiltec Wilson Team Racing	37
Kumho Cup
Pos	Driver	Car	Team	Pts
1	Shane Wilson	Dallara F304 Spiess-Opel	Wiltec Wilson Team Racing	27
2	Ross McAlpine	Dallara F304 Renault-Sodemo	Ross McAlpine	21
