= 2017 Australian Formula 4 Championship =

Australian racing championship

The 2017 CAMS Australian Formula 4 Championship was the third Australian Formula 4 Championship, a motor racing competition for open-wheel racing cars complying with Formula 4 regulations, which were created by the Fédération Internationale de l'Automobile (FIA) for entry-level open-wheel championships. Teams and drivers competed in twenty-one races at six venues, starting on 8 April and ending on 22 October.

== Teams and drivers ==
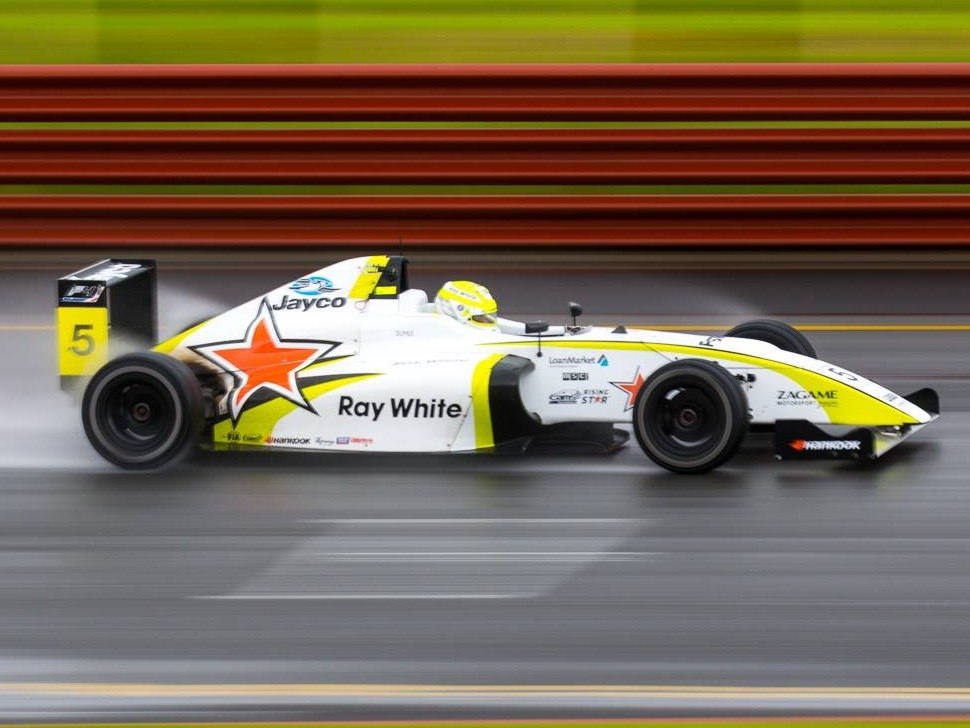
Ryan Suhle placed fourth in the championship driving for Zagame Motorsport Juniors

The following teams and drivers competed in the 2017 Australian Formula 4 Championship.

Team	No.	Drivers	Status	Rounds
AGI Sport	4	(Australia) Sage Murdoch	R	5–7
AGI Sport	44	(Australia) Sage Murdoch	R	1–4
AGI Sport	21	(Australia) Harley Haber	R	1–3, 6
AGI Sport	76	(Australia) Zakkary Best	R	All
AGI Sport	97	(Australia) Nick Rowe		All
Zagame Motorsport Juniors	5	(Australia) Ryan Suhle	R	All
Zagame Motorsport Juniors	7	(Australia) Tyler Everingham		All
Zagame Motorsport Juniors	96	(Australia) Luis Leeds		7
Team BRM	11	(Australia) Zane Morse	R	All
Team BRM	27	(Australia) Simon Fallon		All
Team BRM	30	(New Zealand) Liam Lawson	R	All
Team BRM	73	(Australia) Cameron Shields		All
Team BRM	78	(Australia) Aaron Love	R	All
Team BRM	91	(Australia) Josh Denton		1–4
JRD Development	61	(Australia) Jordan Mazzaroli	R	All

Icon	Legend
R	Rookie

== Calendar ==
All rounds supported the Supercars Championship, with the exceptions of rounds one, two and four that featured within the Shannons Nationals.

Round		Circuit	Date	Pole position	Fastest lap	Winning driver	Winning team
1	R1	Sandown Raceway, Melbourne	8 April	(Australia) Nick Rowe	(Australia) Josh Denton	(Australia) Nick Rowe	AGI Sport
1	R2	Sandown Raceway, Melbourne	8 April		(New Zealand) Liam Lawson	(Australia) Josh Denton	Team BRM
1	R3	Sandown Raceway, Melbourne	8 April	(New Zealand) Liam Lawson	(Australia) Cameron Shields	(New Zealand) Liam Lawson	Team BRM
2	R1	Sandown Raceway, Melbourne	9 April	(Australia) Ryan Suhle	(Australia) Nick Rowe	(New Zealand) Liam Lawson	Team BRM
2	R2	Sandown Raceway, Melbourne	9 April		(Australia) Nick Rowe	(Australia) Nick Rowe	AGI Sport
2	R3	Sandown Raceway, Melbourne	9 April	(Australia) Ryan Suhle	(Australia) Nick Rowe	(Australia) Nick Rowe	AGI Sport
3	R1	Barbagallo Raceway, Perth	6 May	(Australia) Nick Rowe	(Australia) Nick Rowe	(Australia) Cameron Shields	Team BRM
3	R2	Barbagallo Raceway, Perth	7 May		(Australia) Josh Denton	(New Zealand) Liam Lawson	Team BRM
3	R3	Barbagallo Raceway, Perth	7 May	(Australia) Nick Rowe	(Australia) Cameron Shields	(Australia) Cameron Shields	Team BRM
4	R1	Phillip Island Grand Prix Circuit, Phillip Island	27 May	(Australia) Ryan Suhle	(Australia) Cameron Shields	(Australia) Ryan Suhle	Zagame Motorsport Juniors
4	R2	Phillip Island Grand Prix Circuit, Phillip Island	27 May		(Australia) Nick Rowe	(Australia) Tyler Everingham	Zagame Motorsport Juniors
4	R3	Phillip Island Grand Prix Circuit, Phillip Island	28 May	(Australia) Ryan Suhle	(Australia) Ryan Suhle	(Australia) Simon Fallon	Team BRM
5	R1	Queensland Raceway, Ipswich	29 July	(Australia) Nick Rowe	(Australia) Nick Rowe	(Australia) Nick Rowe	AGI Sport
5	R2	Queensland Raceway, Ipswich	29 July		(Australia) Nick Rowe	(Australia) Cameron Shields	Team BRM
5	R3	Queensland Raceway, Ipswich	30 July	(Australia) Nick Rowe	(Australia) Cameron Shields	(Australia) Nick Rowe	AGI Sport
6	R1	Sydney Motorsport Park, Eastern Creek	19 August	(Australia) Cameron Shields	(Australia) Nick Rowe	(Australia) Cameron Shields	Team BRM
6	R2	Sydney Motorsport Park, Eastern Creek	20 August		(Australia) Nick Rowe	(Australia) Nick Rowe	AGI Sport
6	R3	Sydney Motorsport Park, Eastern Creek	20 August	(Australia) Cameron Shields	(Australia) Cameron Shields	(Australia) Nick Rowe	AGI Sport
7	R1	Surfers Paradise Street Circuit, Surfers Paradise	21 October	(Australia) Nick Rowe	(Australia) Simon Fallon	(New Zealand) Liam Lawson	Team BRM
7	R2	Surfers Paradise Street Circuit, Surfers Paradise	21 October		(Australia) Nick Rowe	(Australia) Nick Rowe	AGI Sport
7	R3	Surfers Paradise Street Circuit, Surfers Paradise	22 October	(Australia) Nick Rowe	(Australia) Nick Rowe	(New Zealand) Liam Lawson	Team BRM

== Championship standings ==
Points were awarded to the top 10 classified finishers in each race.

Position	**1st**	**2nd**	**3rd**	**4th**	**5th**	**6th**	**7th**	**8th**	**9th**	**10th**
Points	25	18	15	12	10	8	6	4	2	1

=== Drivers' standings ===
Pos	Driver	SAN1			SAN2			BAR			PHI			QLD			SYD			SUR			Points
1	(Australia) Nick Rowe	**1**	4	5	3	1	1	**4**	2	**2**	4	3	Ret	**1**	3	**1**	2	1	1	**3**	1	**2**	378
2	(New Zealand) Liam Lawson	2	2	**1**	1	2	2	3	1	9	3	10	7	10	4	6	6	6	3	1	4	1	300
3	(Australia) Cameron Shields	Ret	Ret	2	2	3	5	1	5	1	2	8	3	2	1	7	**1**	2	**2**	11	Ret	6	276
4	(Australia) Ryan Suhle	3	3	3	**9**	7	**4**	8	6	Ret	**1**	12	**2**	4	2	2	5	3	5	5	3	9	230
5	(Australia) Tyler Everingham	6	5	10	Ret	9	9	2	4	3	10	1	5	5	7	3	3	5	4	6	5	7	196
6	(Australia) Simon Fallon	11	6	6	Ret	Ret	10	7	11	6	6	5	1	7	10	4	Ret	Ret	6	2	Ret	3	134
7	(Australia) Zane Morse	Ret	10	13	7	8	7	10	7	7	5	2	8	9	8	5	Ret	4	9	8	2	8	118
8	(Australia) Josh Denton	4	1	4	8	11	8	5	3	4	Ret	11	4										106
9	(Australia) Aaron Love	7	8	8	6	10	3	9	9	5	7	6	Ret	8	9	8	9	Ret	10	4	Ret	5	101
10	(Australia) Zak Best	8	Ret	11	5	4	Ret	13	10	10	9	9	6	6	6	10	8	7	7	9	6	11	83
11	(Australia) Jordan Mazzaroli	5	7	7	Ret	5	Ret	6	8	11	8	7	9	11	11	9	Ret	8	8	10	7	Ret	73
12	(Australia) Sage Murdoch	10	Ret	12	10	Ret	11	12	13	8	Ret	4	Ret	3	5	Ret	4	Ret	11	Ret	8	10	60
13	(Australia) Harley Haber	9	9	9	4	6	6	11	12	12							7	Ret	12				40
14	(Australia) Luis Leeds																			7	Ret	4	18
Pos	Driver	SAN1			SAN2			BAR			PHI			QLD			SYD			SUR			Points

Colour	Result
Gold	Winner
Silver	Second place
Bronze	Third place
Green	Points classification
Blue	Non-points classification
Blue	Non-classified finish (NC)
Purple	Retired, not classified (Ret)
Red	Did not qualify (DNQ)
Red	Did not pre-qualify (DNPQ)
Black	Disqualified (DSQ)
White	Did not start (DNS)
White	Withdrew (WD)
White	Race cancelled (C)
Blank	Did not practice (DNP)
Blank	Did not arrive (DNA)
Blank	Excluded (EX)

Bold – Pole
Italics – Fastest lap
