= 2022 IMSA SportsCar Weekend =

Track map of Road America

The 2022 IMSA SportsCar Weekend was a sports car race sanctioned by the International Motor Sports Association (IMSA). The Race was held at Road America in Elkhart Lake, Wisconsin on August 7, 2022. The race was the tenth round of the 2022 IMSA SportsCar Championship, and the seventh round of the WeatherTech Sprint Cup.

== Background ==
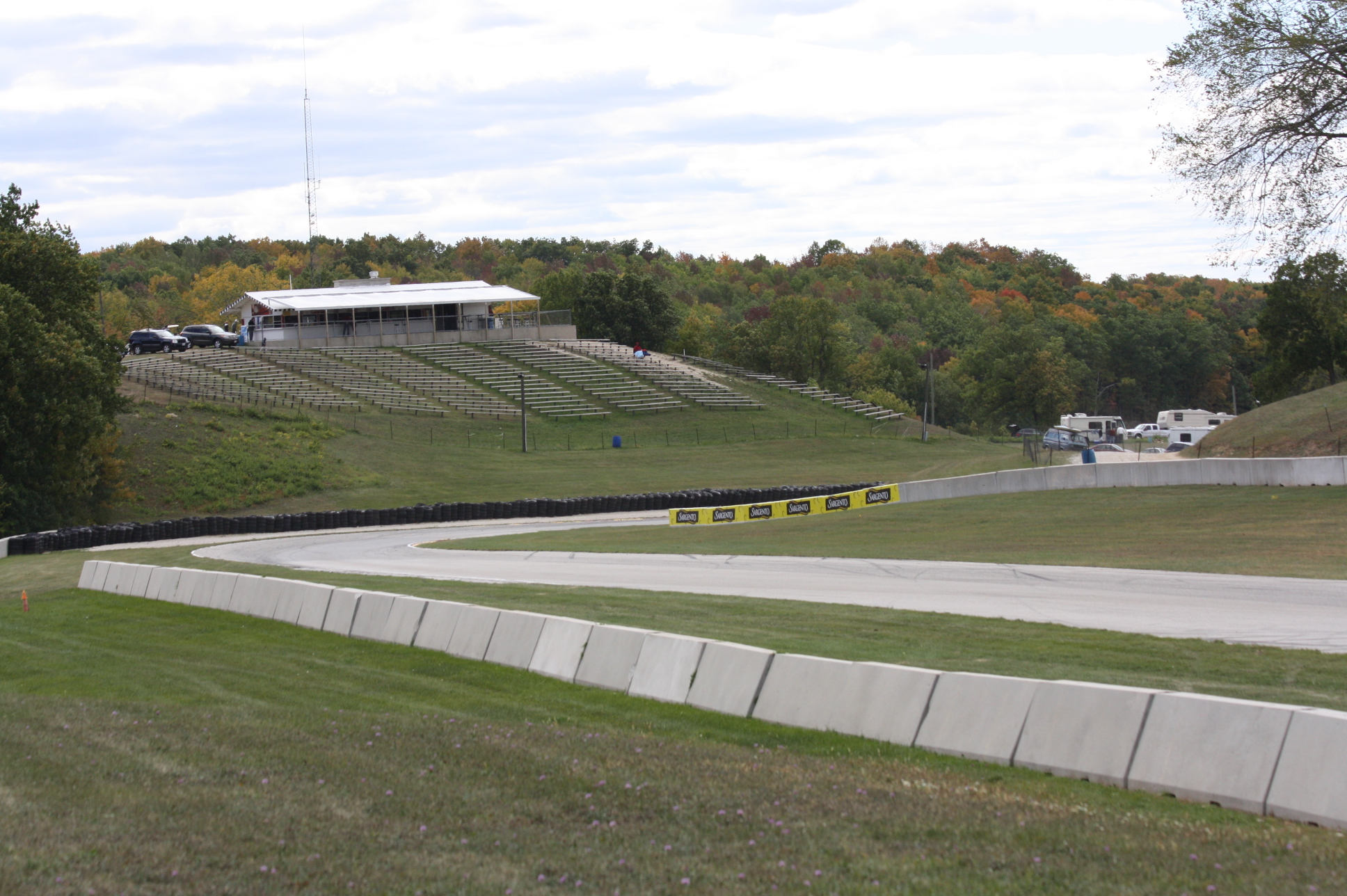
Road America, where the race was held.

International Motor Sports Association's (IMSA) president John Doonan confirmed the race was part of the schedule for the 2022 IMSA SportsCar Championship (IMSA SCC) in August 2021. It was the ninth consecutive year the event was held as part of the WeatherTech SportsCar Championship. The 2022 IMSA SportsCar Weekend was the tenth of twelve scheduled sports car races of 2022 by IMSA, and it was the seventh of eight rounds held as part of the WeatherTech Sprint Cup. The race was held at the fourteen-turn 4.048 mi (6.515 km) Road America in Elkhart Lake, Wisconsin on August 7, 2022.

During this race weekend, IMSA holds their "State of the Series" annual press conference, in which they confirm and announce their future plans for the series they sanction. After only one entry committed to the WeatherTech Sprint Cup, IMSA announced that the WeatherTech Sprint Cup would be discontinued after the 2022 season ended. However, plans were reversed and the WeatherTech Sprint Cup would be reinstated for 2023. The LMP3 class was given a one-year extension to remain in the IMSA WeatherTech SportsCar Championship.

The events start time was moved from 1:40 pm CT to 10:40 am CT after an opportunity to have USA Network broadcast the event live became available.

On August 3, 2022, IMSA released the latest technical bulletin outlining Balance of Performance for the event. In DPi, the Acura ARX-05 received a 10 kilogram weight increase. In GTD Pro and GTD, the Mercedes-AMG GT3 Evo and Porsche 911 GT3 R were given weight increases of 20 and 10 kilograms, respectively.

Before the race, Tom Blomqvist and Oliver Jarvis led the DPi Drivers' Championship with 2737 points, 56 points ahead of Filipe Albuquerque and Ricky Taylor in second position. The LMP2 Drivers' Championship was led by John Farano with 1294 points; 37 points clear of Juan Pablo Montoya and Henrik Hedman in second followed by Steven Thomas and Jonathan Bomarito with 1232 points in third position. In LMP3, Jon Bennett and Colin Braun led Drivers' Championship; the duo held a 98 point advantage over Garett Grist and Ari Balogh. With 2441 points, Matt Campbell and Mathieu Jaminet led the GTD Pro Drivers' Championship by 226 points over Antonio García and Jordan Taylor in second followed by Ben Barnicoat in third with 2181 points. Stevan McAleer led the GTD Drivers' Championship with 2071 points; 40 points ahead of Ryan Hardwick and Jan Heylen while Roman De Angelis was third with 2010 points. Acura, Porsche, and BMW were leading their respective Manufactures' Championships while Meyer Shank Racing, PR1/Mathiasen Motorsports, CORE Autosport, Pfaff Motorsports, and Gilbert Korthoff Motorsports each led their own Teams' Championships.

=== Entries ===
37 cars took part in the event split across 5 classes. 6 were entered in DPi, 6 in LMP2, 9 in LMP3, 5 in GTD Pro, and 11 in GTD. In LMP2, Tristan Nunez replaced Jonathan Bomarito in the #11 PR1/Mathiasen Motorsports entry. Patrick Kelly and Josh Pierson returned to the #52 PR1/Mathiasen Motorsports entry. Fabio Scherer joined Dennis Andersen in the High Class Racing entry. In LMP3, Malthe Jakobsen replaced Lance Willsey in the Sean Creech Motorsports #33. James French joined Cameron Shields in the Performance Tech Motorsports entry. JDC-Miller MotorSports added a one-off entry featuring Gerry Kraut and Scott Andrews. In GTD, NTE Sport returned after skipping the previous round at Lime Rock. Daniel Juncadella joined Cooper MacNeil in the WeatherTech Racing entry.

== Practice ==
There were two practice sessions preceding the start of the race on Sunday, both on Friday. The first session on Friday morning lasted one hour while the second session on Friday afternoon lasted 75 minutes.

=== Practice 1 ===
The first practice session took place at 11:05 am CT on Friday and ended with Ricky Taylor topping the charts for WTR - Konica Minolta Acura, with a lap time of 1:09.583.

Pos.	Class	No.	Team	Driver	Time	Gap
1	DPi	10	WTR - Konica Minolta Acura	Ricky Taylor	1:50.539	_
2	DPi	02	Cadillac Racing	Earl Bamber	1:50.835	+0.296
3	DPi	31	Whelen Engineering Racing	Pipo Derani	1:51.051	+0.512

=== Practice 2 ===
The second and final practice session took place at 3:15 pm CT on Friday and ended with Alex Lynn topping the charts for Cadillac Racing, with a lap time of 1:49.321.

Pos.	Class	No.	Team	Driver	Time	Gap
1	DPi	02	Cadillac Racing	Alex Lynn	1:49.321	_
2	DPi	01	Cadillac Racing	Sébastien Bourdais	1:49.574	+0.253
3	DPi	10	WTR - Konica Minolta Acura	Filipe Albuquerque	1:49.640	+0.319

== Qualifying ==
Saturday's morning qualifying was broken into three sessions, with one session for the DPi and LMP2, LMP3, GTD Pro and GTD classes, which lasted for 15 minutes each, and a ten minute interval between the sessions. The rules dictated that all teams nominated a driver to qualify their cars, with the Pro-Am (LMP2/LMP3/GTD) classes requiring a Bronze/Silver Rated Driver to qualify the car. The competitors' fastest lap times determined the starting order. IMSA then arranged the grid to put DPis ahead of the LMP2, LMP3, GTD Pro, and GTD cars.

Filipe Albuquerque claimed overall pole for the event for WTR - Konica Minolta Acura.

=== Qualifying results ===
Pole positions in each class are indicated in bold and by ‡.

Pos.	Class	No.	Team	Driver	Time	Gap	Grid
1	**DPi**	**10**	**(United States) WTR - Konica Minolta Acura**	**(Portugal) Filipe Albuquerque**	**1:48.915**	-	1‡
2	DPi	02	(United States) Cadillac Racing	(United Kingdom) Alex Lynn	1:49.097	+0.182	2
3	DPi	60	(United States) Meyer Shank Racing with Curb-Agajanian	(United Kingdom) Tom Blomqvist	1:49.841	+0.926	3
4	DPi	31	(United States) Whelen Engineering Racing	(France) Olivier Pla	1:50.322	+1.407	4
5	DPi	5	(United States) JDC-Miller MotorSports	(France) Tristan Vautier	1:50.369	+1.454	5
6	**LMP2**	**11**	**(United States) PR1/Mathiasen Motorsports**	**(United States) Steven Thomas**	**1:54.137**	**+5.222**	7‡
7	LMP2	52	(United States) PR1/Mathiasen Motorsports	(United States) Patrick Kelly	1:54.271	+5.356	8
8	LMP2	18	(United States) Era Motorsport	(United States) Dwight Merriman	1:54.677	+5.762	9
9	LMP2	20	(Denmark) High Class Racing	(Denmark) Dennis Andersen	1:54.678	+5.763	10
10	LMP2	8	(United States) Tower Motorsport	(Canada) John Farano	1:54.809	+5.894	11
11	LMP2	81	(United States) DragonSpeed - 10 Star	(Sweden) Henrik Hedman	1:54.833	+5.918	12
12	**LMP3**	**33**	**(United States) Sean Creech Motorsport**	**(Denmark) Malthe Jakobsen**	**1:59.434**	**+10.519**	13‡
13	LMP3	36	(United States) Andretti Autosport	(United States) Jarett Andretti	2:00.163	+11.248	14
14	LMP3	74	(United States) Riley Motorsports	(United States) Gar Robinson	2:00.969	+12.054	15
15	LMP3	58	(United States) MLT Motorsports	(United States) Josh Sarchet	2:01.083	+12.168	16
16	LMP3	38	(United States) Performance Tech Motorsports	(Australia) Cameron Shields	2:01.369	+12.454	17
17	LMP3	54	(United States) CORE Autosport	(United States) Jon Bennett	2:02.778	+13.863	18
18	LMP3	30	(United States) Jr III Motorsports	(United States) Ari Balogh	2:03.907	+14.992	19
19	LMP3	90	(United States) JDC-Miller MotorSports	(United States) Gerry Kraut	2:04.307	+15.392	20
20	**GTD Pro**	**14**	**(United States) Vasser Sullivan Racing**	**(United Kingdom) Jack Hawksworth**	**2:05.365**	**+16.450**	22‡
21	GTD Pro	9	(Canada) Pfaff Motorsports	(Australia) Matt Campbell	2:05.618	+16.703	23
22	GTD Pro	3	(United States) Corvette Racing	(Spain) Antonio Garcia	2:05.829	+16.914	24
23	LMP3	13	(Canada) AWA	(Canada) Orey Fidani	2:05.942	+17.027	21
24	**GTD**	**96**	**(United States) Turner Motorsport**	**(United States) Robby Foley**	**2:06.084**	**+17.169**	25‡
25	GTD	12	(United States) Vasser Sullivan Racing	(United States) Frankie Montecalvo	2:06.224	+17.309	26
26	GTD	39	(United States) CarBahn with Peregrine Racing	(United States) Robert Megennis	2:06.237	+17.322	27
27	GTD	32	(United States) Team Korthoff Motorsports	(United Kingdom) Stevan McAleer	2:06.275	+17.360	28
28	GTD Pro	25	(United States) BMW M Team RLL	(United States) John Edwards	2:06.289	+17.374	29
29	GTD	57	(United States) Winward Racing	(United States) Russell Ward	2:06.297	+17.382	30
30	GTD Pro	23	(United States) Heart of Racing Team	(Spain) Alex Riberas	2:06.517	+17.602	31
31	GTD	27	(United States) Heart of Racing Team	(Canada) Roman De Angelis	2:06.631	+17.716	32
32	GTD	1	(United States) Paul Miller Racing	(United States) Madison Snow	2:06.674	+17.759	33
33	GTD	79	(United States) WeatherTech Racing	(United States) Cooper MacNeil	2:06.895	+18.980	34
34	GTD	16	(United States) Wright Motorsports	(United States) Ryan Hardwick	2:07.999	+19.084	35
35	DPi	01	(United States) Cadillac Racing	(France) Sébastien Bourdais	No time^{1}	_	6
36	GTD	42	(United States) NTE Sport/SSR	(United States) Jaden Conwright	No time^{2}	_	36
37	GTD	51	(United States) Rick Ware Racing	(Australia) Aidan Read	No time^{3}	_	37
Sources:

- ^{1} The No. 01 Cadillac Racing entry had its two fastest laps deleted as penalty for causing a red flag during its qualifying session.
- ^{2} The No. 42 NTE Sport/SSR car had all its qualifying times disallowed as per Article 40.2.9 of the Sporting regulations (driver exiting the car during qualifying without permission by the officials).
- ^{3} The No. 51 Rick Ware Racing car had all its qualifying times disallowed as per Article 40.2.9 of the Sporting regulations (driver exiting the car during qualifying without permission by the officials).

== Race ==
=== Post-Race ===
Filipe Albuquerque and Ricky Taylor's victory allowed them to retake the lead of the DPi Drivers' Championship while Blomqvist and Jarvis dropped to second. The final results of LMP2 meant Farano was still in the lead of the Drivers' Championship, but his advantage was reduced to 33 points as Dalziel and Merriman took over second position. Hedman and Montoya dropped from second to fourth. The final results of LMP3 kept Bennett and Braun atop the Drivers' Championship while Robinson advanced from third to second. Fidani jumped to fifth after being sixth coming into Road America. The final results of GTD Pro kept Campbell and Jaminet atop the Drivers' Championship as Barnicoat took over second position. The final results of GTD meant McAleer atop the Drivers' Championship, but his advantage was reduced by 4 points by seventh-place finishers Hardwick and Heylen. Acura, Porsche, and BMW continued to top their respective Manufacturers' Championships, while PR1/Mathiasen Motorsports, CORE Autosport, Pfaff Motorsports, and Gilbert Korthoff Motorsports kept their respective advantages in their Teams' Championships. Wayne Taylor Racing took the lead of the DPi Teams' Championship with two rounds remaining.

=== Race results ===
Class winners are denoted in bold and ‡.

Pos	Class	No.	Team	Drivers	Chassis	Laps	Time/Retired
Pos	Class	No.	Team	Drivers	Engine	Laps	Time/Retired
1	**DPi**	**10**	**(United States) WTR - Konica Minolta Acura**	(Portugal) **Filipe Albuquerque** (United States) Ricky Taylor	**Acura ARX-05**	**64**	**2:40:44.167‡**
1	**DPi**	**10**	**(United States) WTR - Konica Minolta Acura**	(Portugal) **Filipe Albuquerque** (United States) Ricky Taylor	**Acura AR35TT 3.5 L Turbo V6**	**64**	**2:40:44.167‡**
2	DPi	02	(United States) Cadillac Racing	(United Kingdom) Alex Lynn (New Zealand) Earl Bamber	Cadillac DPi-V.R	64	+1.463
2	DPi	02	(United States) Cadillac Racing	(United Kingdom) Alex Lynn (New Zealand) Earl Bamber	Cadillac 5.5 L V8	64	+1.463
3	DPi	01	(United States) Cadillac Racing	(France) Sebastien Bourdais (Netherlands) Renger van der Zande	Cadillac DPi-V.R	64	+1.981
3	DPi	01	(United States) Cadillac Racing	(France) Sebastien Bourdais (Netherlands) Renger van der Zande	Cadillac 5.5 L V8	64	+1.981
4	DPi	60	(United States) Meyer Shank Racing with Curb-Agajanian	(United Kingdom) Oliver Jarvis (United Kingdom) Tom Blomqvist	Acura ARX-05	64	+3.819
4	DPi	60	(United States) Meyer Shank Racing with Curb-Agajanian	(United Kingdom) Oliver Jarvis (United Kingdom) Tom Blomqvist	Acura AR35TT 3.5 L Turbo V6	64	+3.819
5	DPi	5	(United States) JDC-Miller MotorSports	(France) Tristan Vautier (United Kingdom) Richard Westbrook	Cadillac DPi-V.R	64	+7.003
5	DPi	5	(United States) JDC-Miller MotorSports	(France) Tristan Vautier (United Kingdom) Richard Westbrook	Cadillac 5.5 L V8	64	+7.003
6	DPi	31	(United States) Whelen Engineering Racing	(France) Oliver Pla (Brazil) Pipo Derani	Cadillac DPi-V.R	64	+7.189
6	DPi	31	(United States) Whelen Engineering Racing	(France) Oliver Pla (Brazil) Pipo Derani	Cadillac 5.5 L V8	64	+7.189
7	**LMP2**	**18**	**(United States) Era Motorsport**	**(United States) Dwight Merriman (United Kingdom) Ryan Dalziel**	**Oreca 07**	**64**	**+19.642 ‡**
7	**LMP2**	**18**	**(United States) Era Motorsport**	**(United States) Dwight Merriman (United Kingdom) Ryan Dalziel**	**Gibson GK428 4.2 L V8**	**64**	**+19.642 ‡**
8	LMP2	8	(United States) Tower Motorsport	(Canada) John Farano (Switzerland) Louis Delétraz	Oreca 07	64	+20.358
8	LMP2	8	(United States) Tower Motorsport	(Canada) John Farano (Switzerland) Louis Delétraz	Gibson GK428 4.2 L V8	64	+20.358
9	LMP2	20	(Denmark) High Class Racing	(Denmark) Dennis Andersen (Switzerland) Fabio Scherer	Oreca 07	64	+21.147
9	LMP2	20	(Denmark) High Class Racing	(Denmark) Dennis Andersen (Switzerland) Fabio Scherer	Gibson GK428 4.2 L V8	64	+21.147
10	LMP2	11	(United States) PR1/Mathiasen Motorsports	(United States) Steven Thomas (United States) Tristan Nunez	Oreca 07	64	+21.944
10	LMP2	11	(United States) PR1/Mathiasen Motorsports	(United States) Steven Thomas (United States) Tristan Nunez	Gibson GK428 4.2 L V8	64	+21.944
11	LMP2	52	(United States) PR1/Mathiasen Motorsports	(United States) Patrick Kelly (United States) Josh Pierson	Oreca 07	64	+24.339
11	LMP2	52	(United States) PR1/Mathiasen Motorsports	(United States) Patrick Kelly (United States) Josh Pierson	Gibson GK428 4.2 L V8	64	+24.339
12	LMP2	81	(United States) DragonSpeed - 10 Star	(Sweden) Henrik Hedman (Colombia) Juan Pablo Montoya	Oreca 07	64	+35.124
12	LMP2	81	(United States) DragonSpeed - 10 Star	(Sweden) Henrik Hedman (Colombia) Juan Pablo Montoya	Gibson GK428 4.2 L V8	64	+35.124
13	**LMP3**	**74**	**(United States) Riley Motorsports**	**(United States) Gar Robinson (Brazil) Felipe Fraga**	**Ligier JS P320**	**62**	**+2 Laps‡**
13	**LMP3**	**74**	**(United States) Riley Motorsports**	**(United States) Gar Robinson (Brazil) Felipe Fraga**	**Nissan VK56DE 5.6 L V8**	**62**	**+2 Laps‡**
14	LMP3	13	(Canada) AWA	(Canada) Orey Fidani (United Kingdom) Matthew Bell	Duqueine D-08	62	+2 Laps
14	LMP3	13	(Canada) AWA	(Canada) Orey Fidani (United Kingdom) Matthew Bell	Nissan VK56DE 5.6 L V8	62	+2 Laps
15	LMP3	54	(United States) CORE Autosport	(United States) Jon Bennett (United States) Colin Braun	Ligier JS P320	62	+2 Laps
15	LMP3	54	(United States) CORE Autosport	(United States) Jon Bennett (United States) Colin Braun	Nissan VK56DE 5.6 L V8	62	+2 Laps
16	LMP3	30	(United States) Jr III Motorsports	(United States) Ari Balogh (Canada) Garett Grist	Ligier JS P320	62	+ 2 Laps
16	LMP3	30	(United States) Jr III Motorsports	(United States) Ari Balogh (Canada) Garett Grist	Nissan VK56DE 5.6 L V8	62	+ 2 Laps
17	LMP3	58	(United States) MLT Motorsports	(United States) Josh Sarchet (United States) Dakota Dickerson	Ligier JS P320	62	+2 Laps
17	LMP3	58	(United States) MLT Motorsports	(United States) Josh Sarchet (United States) Dakota Dickerson	Nissan VK56DE 5.6 L V8	62	+2 Laps
18	LMP3	38	(United States) Performance Tech Motorsports	(United States) James French (Australia) Cameron Shields	Ligier JS P320	62	+2 Laps
18	LMP3	38	(United States) Performance Tech Motorsports	(United States) James French (Australia) Cameron Shields	Nissan VK56DE 5.6 L V8	62	+2 Laps
19	LMP3	90	(United States) JDC-Miller MotorSports	(United States) Gerry Kraut (Australia) Scott Andrews	Duqueine D-08	61	+3 Laps
19	LMP3	90	(United States) JDC-Miller MotorSports	(United States) Gerry Kraut (Australia) Scott Andrews	Nissan VK56DE 5.6 L V8	61	+3 Laps
20	**GTD Pro**	**14**	**(United States) Vasser Sullivan Racing**	**(United Kingdom) Ben Barnicoat** **(United Kingdom) Jack Hawksworth**	**Lexus RC F GT3**	**61**	**+3 Laps**‡
20	**GTD Pro**	**14**	**(United States) Vasser Sullivan Racing**	**(United Kingdom) Ben Barnicoat** **(United Kingdom) Jack Hawksworth**	**Toyota 2UR 5.0 L V8**	**61**	**+3 Laps**‡
21	GTD Pro	9	(Canada) Pfaff Motorsports	(Australia) Matt Campbell (France) Mathieu Jaminet	Porsche 911 GT3 R	61	+3 Laps
21	GTD Pro	9	(Canada) Pfaff Motorsports	(Australia) Matt Campbell (France) Mathieu Jaminet	Porsche 4.0 L Flat-6	61	+3 Laps
22	GTD Pro	3	(United States) Corvette Racing	(Spain) Antonio García (United States) Jordan Taylor	Chevrolet Corvette C8.R GTD	61	+3 Laps
22	GTD Pro	3	(United States) Corvette Racing	(Spain) Antonio García (United States) Jordan Taylor	Chevrolet 5.5L V8	61	+3 Laps
23	GTD Pro	23	(United States) Heart of Racing Team	(United Kingdom) Ross Gunn (Spain) Alex Riberas	Aston Martin Vantage AMR GT3	61	+3 Laps
23	GTD Pro	23	(United States) Heart of Racing Team	(United Kingdom) Ross Gunn (Spain) Alex Riberas	Aston Martin 4.0 L Turbo V8	61	+3 Laps
24	LMP3	36	(United States) Andretti Autosport	(United States) Jarett Andretti (Colombia) Gabby Chaves	Ligier JS P320	61	+3 Laps
24	LMP3	36	(United States) Andretti Autosport	(United States) Jarett Andretti (Colombia) Gabby Chaves	Nissan VK56DE 5.6 L V8	61	+3 Laps
25	**GTD**	**57**	**(United States) Winward Racing**	**(United Kingdom) Philip Ellis** **(United States) Russell Ward**	**Mercedes-AMG GT3 Evo**	**60**	**+4 Laps**‡
25	**GTD**	**57**	**(United States) Winward Racing**	**(United Kingdom) Philip Ellis** **(United States) Russell Ward**	**Mercedes-AMG M159 6.2 L V8**	**60**	**+4 Laps**‡
26	GTD	39	(United States) CarBahn with Peregrine Racing	(United States) Robert Megennis (United States) Jeff Westphal	Lamborghini Huracán GT3 Evo	60	+4 Laps
26	GTD	39	(United States) CarBahn with Peregrine Racing	(United States) Robert Megennis (United States) Jeff Westphal	Lamborghini 5.2 L V10	60	+4 Laps
27	GTD	12	(United States) Vasser Sullivan Racing	(United States) Frankie Montecalvo (United States) Aaron Telitz	Lexus RC F GT3	60	+4 Laps
27	GTD	12	(United States) Vasser Sullivan Racing	(United States) Frankie Montecalvo (United States) Aaron Telitz	Toyota 2UR 5.0 L V8	60	+4 Laps
28	GTD	1	(United States) Paul Miller Racing	(United States) Bryan Sellers (United States) Madison Snow	BMW M4 GT3	60	+4 Laps
28	GTD	1	(United States) Paul Miller Racing	(United States) Bryan Sellers (United States) Madison Snow	BMW S58B30T0 3.0 L Twin Turbo I6	60	+4 Laps
29	GTD	42	(United States) NTE Sport/SSR	(Germany) Marco Holzer (United States) Jaden Conwright	Lamborghini Huracán GT3 Evo	60	+4 Laps
29	GTD	42	(United States) NTE Sport/SSR	(Germany) Marco Holzer (United States) Jaden Conwright	Lamborghini 5.2 L V10	60	+4 Laps
30	GTD	27	(United States) Heart of Racing Team	(Canada) Roman De Angelis (Belgium) Maxime Martin	Aston Martin Vantage AMR GT3	60	+4 Laps
30	GTD	27	(United States) Heart of Racing Team	(Canada) Roman De Angelis (Belgium) Maxime Martin	Aston Martin 4.0 L Turbo V8	60	+4 Laps
31	GTD	16	(United States) Wright Motorsports	(United States) Ryan Hardwick (Belgium) Jan Heylen	Porsche 911 GT3 R	60	+4 Laps
31	GTD	16	(United States) Wright Motorsports	(United States) Ryan Hardwick (Belgium) Jan Heylen	Porsche 4.0 L Flat-6	60	+4 Laps
32	GTD	32	(United States) Team Korthoff Motorsports	(United Kingdom) Stevan McAleer (United States) Mike Skeen	Mercedes-AMG GT3 Evo	59	+5 Laps
32	GTD	32	(United States) Team Korthoff Motorsports	(United Kingdom) Stevan McAleer (United States) Mike Skeen	Mercedes-AMG M159 6.2 L V8	59	+5 Laps
33	GTD	51	(United States) Rick Ware Racing	(United States) Ryan Eversley (Australia) Aidan Read	Acura NSX GT3 Evo22	59	+5 Laps
33	GTD	51	(United States) Rick Ware Racing	(United States) Ryan Eversley (Australia) Aidan Read	Acura 3.5 L Turbo V6	59	+5 Laps
34	GTD	96	(United States) Turner Motorsport	(United States) Bill Auberlen (United States) Robby Foley	BMW M4 GT3	59	+5 Laps
34	GTD	96	(United States) Turner Motorsport	(United States) Bill Auberlen (United States) Robby Foley	BMW S58B30T0 3.0 L Twin Turbo I6	59	+5 Laps
35	GTD	79	(United States) WeatherTech Racing	(United States) Cooper MacNeil (Spain) Daniel Juncadella	Mercedes-AMG GT3 Evo	59	+5 Laps
35	GTD	79	(United States) WeatherTech Racing	(United States) Cooper MacNeil (Spain) Daniel Juncadella	Mercedes-AMG M159 6.2 L V8	59	+5 Laps
36	GTD Pro	25	(United States) BMW M Team RLL	(United States) John Edwards (United States) Connor De Phillippi	BMW M4 GT3	56	+8 Laps
36	GTD Pro	25	(United States) BMW M Team RLL	(United States) John Edwards (United States) Connor De Phillippi	BMW S58B30T0 3.0 L Twin Turbo I6	56	+8 Laps
37 DNF	LMP3	33	(United States) Sean Creech Motorsport	(Denmark) Malthe Jakobsen (Portugal) João Barbosa	Ligier JS P320	40	Crash
37 DNF	LMP3	33	(United States) Sean Creech Motorsport	(Denmark) Malthe Jakobsen (Portugal) João Barbosa	Nissan VK56DE 5.6 L V8	40	Crash

== Standings after the race ==
DPi Drivers' Championship standings
Pos.	+/–	Driver	Points
1	1	(Portugal) Filipe Albuquerque (United States) Ricky Taylor	3066
2	1	(United Kingdom) Tom Blomqvist (United Kingdom) Oliver Jarvis	3047
3		(France) Sébastien Bourdais (Netherlands) Renger van der Zande	2914
4		(United Kingdom) Alex Lynn (New Zealand) Earl Bamber	2899
5		(Brazil) Pipo Derani	2739

LMP2 Drivers' Championship standings
Pos.	+/–	Driver	Points
1		(Canada) John Farano	1640
2	2	(United Kingdom) Ryan Dalziel (United States) Dwight Merriman	1607
3		(United States) Steven Thomas	1547
4	2	(Colombia) Juan Pablo Montoya (Sweden) Henrik Hedman	1532
5		(Denmark) Dennis Andersen (Denmark) Anders Fjordbach	1516

LMP3 Drivers' Championship standings
Pos.	+/–	Driver	Points
1		(United States) Jon Bennett (United States) Colin Braun	1716
2	1	(United States) Gar Robinson	1633
3	1	(Canada) Garett Grist (United States) Ari Balogh	1597
4		(Portugal) João Barbosa	1458
5	1	(Canada) Orey Fidani	1448

GTD Pro Drivers' Championship standings
Pos.	+/–	Driver	Points
1		(Australia) Matt Campbell (France) Mathieu Jaminet	2793
2	1	(United Kingdom) Ben Barnicoat	2566
3	1	(Spain) Antonio García (United States) Jordan Taylor	2556
4		(United Kingdom) Ross Gunn (Spain) Alex Riberas	2476
5		(United States) Connor De Phillippi (United States) John Edwards	2234

GTD Drivers' Championship standings
Pos.	+/–	Driver	Points
1		(United Kingdom) Stevan McAleer	2329
2		(United States) Ryan Hardwick (Belgium) Jan Heylen	2293
3		(Canada) Roman De Angelis	2285
4	1	(United States) Robert Megennis (United States) Jeff Westphal	2231
5	1	(United States) Bill Auberlen (United States) Robby Foley	2204

- Note: Only the top five positions are included for all sets of standings.

DPi Teams' Championship standings
Pos.	+/–	Team	Points
1	1	(United States) #10 WTR - Konica Minolta Acura	3066
2	1	(United States) #60 Meyer Shank Racing w/ Curb-Agajanian	3047
3		(United States) #01 Cadillac Racing	2914
4		(United States) #02 Cadillac Racing	2899
5		(United States) #31 Whelen Engineering Racing	2739

LMP2 Teams' Championship standings
Pos.	+/–	Team	Points
1		(United States) #52 PR1/Mathiasen Motorsports	1659
2		(United States) #8 Tower Motorsport	1640
3	2	(United States) #18 Era Motorsport	1607
4		(United States) #11 PR1/Mathiasen Motorsports	1547
5	2	(United States) #81 DragonSpeed USA	1532

LMP3 Teams' Championship standings
Pos.	+/–	Team	Points
1		(United States) #54 CORE Autosport	1716
2	1	(United States) #74 Riley Motorsports	1633
3	1	(United States) #30 Jr III Motorsports	1597
4		(United States) #33 Sean Creech Motorsport	1458
5	1	(Canada) #13 AWA	1448

GTD Pro Teams' Championship standings
Pos.	+/–	Team	Points
1		(Canada) #9 Pfaff Motorsports	2793
2	1	(United States) #14 Vasser Sullivan Racing	2566
3	1	(United States) #3 Corvette Racing	2556
4		(United States) #23 Heart of Racing Team	2476
5		(United States) #25 BMW M Team RLL	2234

GTD Teams' Championship standings
Pos.	+/–	Team	Points
1		(United States) #32 Gilbert Korthoff Motorsports	2329
2		(United States) #16 Wright Motorsports	2293
3		(United States) #27 Heart of Racing Team	2285
4	1	(United States) #39 CarBahn with Peregrine Racing	2231
5	1	(United States) #96 Turner Motorsport	2204

- Note: Only the top five positions are included for all sets of standings.

DPi Manufacturers' Championship standings
Pos.	+/–	Manufacturer	Points
1		(Japan) Acura	3333
2		(United States) Cadillac	3300

GTD Pro Manufacturers' Championship standings
Pos.	+/–	Manufacturer	Points
1		(Germany) Porsche	2793
2	2	(Japan) Lexus	2596
3		(United States) Chevrolet	2566
4	2	(United Kingdom) Aston Martin	2546
5		(Germany) BMW	2319

GTD Manufacturers' Championship standings
Pos.	+/–	Manufacturer	Points
1		(Germany) BMW	2642
2		(United Kingdom) Aston Martin	2567
3		(Germany) Mercedes-AMG	2564
4	1	(Italy) Lamborghini	2441
5	1	(Germany) Porsche	2416

- Note: Only the top five positions are included for all sets of standings.

IMSA SportsCar Championship
Previous race: 2022 Northeast Grand Prix	2022 season	Next race: 2022 GT Challenge at VIR
