= Tyler Everingham =

Australian racing driver (born 2001)

- Nationality: Australian
- Born: 7 January 2001 (age 25) Dubbo, New South Wales

Super2 Series career
- Debut season: 2019
- Current team: MW Motorsport
- Car number: 27
- Former teams: Anderson Motorsport
- Starts: 23
- Wins: 4
- Podiums: 4
- Poles: 0
- Best finish: 4th in 2022

Previous series
- 2018: Kumho Tyre Australian V8 Touring Car Series

Championship titles
- 2018 2020: Kumho Tyre Australian V8 Touring Car Series; Mike Kable Young Gun Award

Tyler Everingham (born 7 January 2001) is a racing driver from Australia. He currently completes in the TA2 Muscle Car Series and is a co-driver at Tickford Racing, partnering Thomas Randle in the No. 55 Castrol Mustang for the 2024 endurance races. He has previously competed in the Super2 Series for MW Motorsport and Anderson Motorsport. In 2019, he was awarded the Mike Kable Young Gun Award.

Everingham had his first taste for motor racing when he competed in Karting at just ten years of age. As his love for the sport grew and his talent became notable, the then fifteen year old launched into Formula 4 (2016). Everingham’s rise continued when he competed in the Australian Production Car Series (2017), the internationally recognised Bathurst 12-hour (2018) and then the 2018 Kumho Tyre Australian V8 Touring Car Series in which he was crowned the overall series winner.

in 2019, Everingham made his debut in the competitive Dunlop Super 2 Series. An impressive first year, he finished the season with an overall sixth place in the Championship and was also awarded the Mike Kable Young Gun Award, an achievement that has also been presented to past and current legends of the Supercars including Marcos Ambrose, Rick Kelly, Mark Winterbottom, Thomas Randle and Scott McLaughlin.

== Career results ==
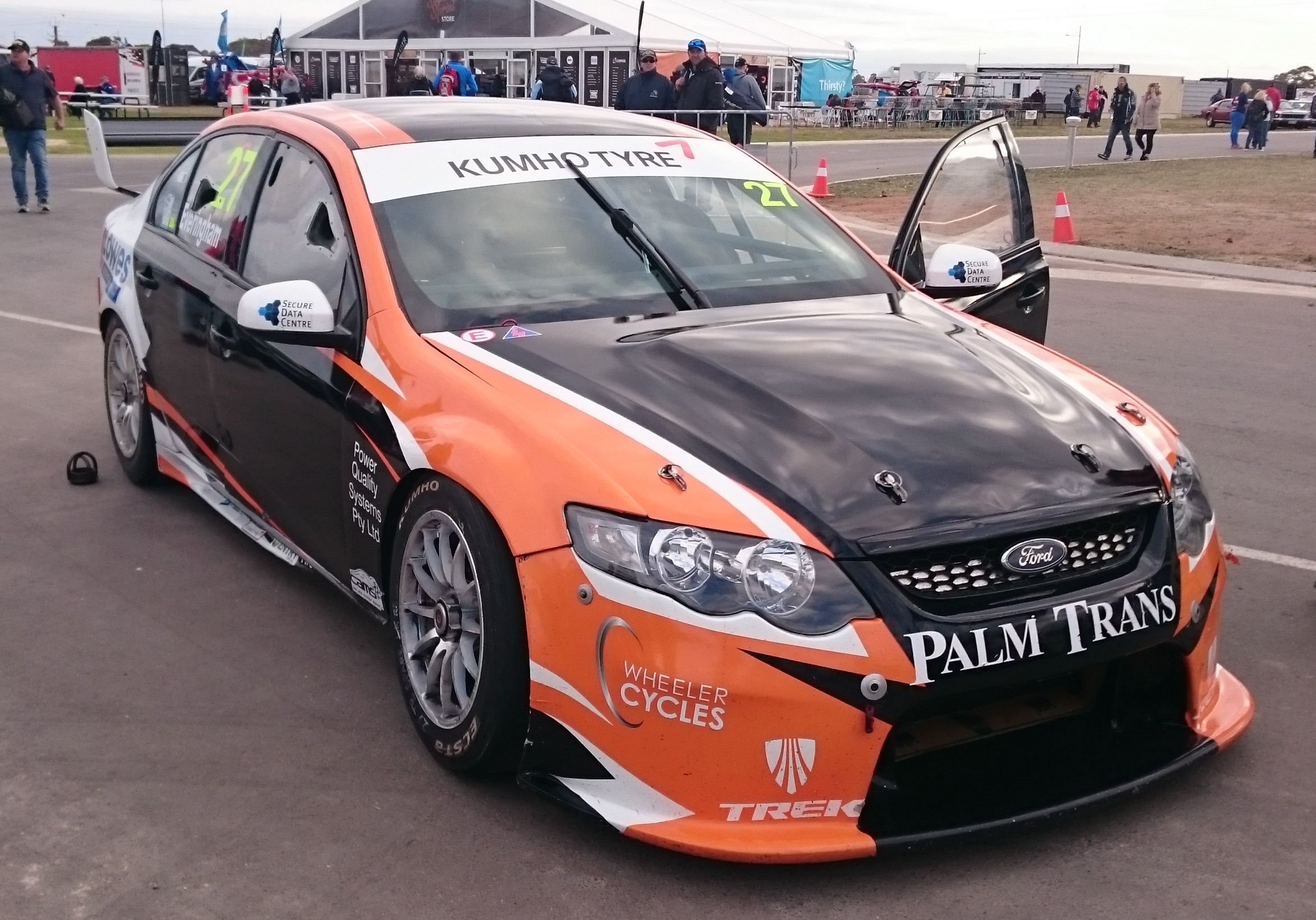
Everingham won the 2018 Kumho Tyre Australian V8 Touring Car Series driving a Ford Falcon FG

=== Career Summary ===
Season	Series	Position	Car	Team
2016	CAMS Jayco Australian Formula 4 Championship	7th	Mygale M14-F4	Junior Racing Development
2016	Victorian State Circuit Racing Formula Vee Championship	11th	Sabre 02	Junior Racing Development
2017	Australian GT Trophy Series - MARC class	5th	Mazda 3 V8	MARC Cars Australia
2017	Australian Production Car Series	5th	Renault Megane RS 265	Osborne Motorsport
2017	CAMS Jayco Australian Formula 4 Championship	5th		
2018	Kumho Tyre Australian V8 Touring Car Series	**1st**	Ford FG Falcon	MW Motorsport
2019	Dunlop Super2 Series	6th	Nissan Altima L33	MW Motorsport
2020	Dunlop Super2 Series	14th	Holden VF Commodore	Anderson Motorsport
2021	Dunlop Super2 Series	6th	Nissan Altima	MW Motorsport
2022	Dunlop Super2 Series	4th	Nissan Altima	MW Motorsport

*Season in progress

=== Complete Australian Formula 4 Championship results ===
(key) (Races in bold indicate pole position) (Races in italics indicate fastest lap)

Year	Team	1	2	3	4	5	6	7	8	9	10	11	12	13	14	15	16	17	18	19	20	21	DC	Points
2016	JRD Development	SYM; 1; 5	SYM; 2; 7	SYM; 3; 9	PHI; 1; 5	PHI; 2; 7	PHI; 3; 8	SMP; 1; 7	SMP; 2; 10	SMP; 3; 6	QLD; 1; 6	QLD; 2; 7	QLD; 3; 8	SAN; 1; 4	SAN; 2; 6	SAN; 3; 8	SUR; 1; 6	SUR; 2; 8	SUR; 3; 6				7th	113
2017	Zagame Motorsport Juniors	SAN1; 1; 6	SAN1; 2; 5	SAN1; 3; 10	SAN2; 1 Ret	SAN2; 2; 9	SAN2; 3; 9	BAR; 1; 2	BAR; 2; 4	BAR; 3; 3	PHI; 1; 10	PHI; 2; 1	PHI; 3; 5	QLD; 1; 5	QLD; 2; 7	QLD; 3; 3	SYD; 1; 3	SYD; 2; 5	SYD; 3; 4	SUR; 1; 6	SUR; 2; 5	SUR; 3; 7	5th	196

=== Super3 Series results ===
(key) (Race results only)

Super3 Series results
Year	Team	No.	Car	1	2	3	4	5	6	7	8	9	10	11	12	13	14	15	Position	Points
2018	MW Motorsport	27	Ford FG Falcon	PHI; R1; 2	PHI; R2; 3	PHI; R3; 4	WIN; R4; 3	WIN; R5; 1	WIN; R6; 2	**SMP**; **R7**; 1	SMP; R8; 1	SMP; R9; 3	QLD; R10; 1	QLD; R11; 1	QLD; R12; 2	BEN; R13; 1	BEN; R14; 1	BEN; R15; 1	1st	634

=== Super2 Series results ===
(key) (Race results only)

Super2 Series results
Year	Team	No.	Car	1	2	3	4	5	6	7	8	9	10	11	12	13	14	Position	Points
2019	MW Motorsport	27	Nissan Altima L33	ADE; R1; DNS	ADE; R2; Ret	ADE; R3; 15	BAR; R4; 15	BAR; R5; 12	TOW; R6; 8	TOW; R7; 11	QLD; R8; 7	QLD; R9; 8	BAT; R10; 5	SAN; R11; 1	SAN; R12; 9	NEW; R13; 13	NEW; R14; 11	6th	1111
2020	Anderson Motorsport	7	Holden VF Commodore	ADE; R1	ADE; R2	ADE; R3	SYD; R4; 5	SYD; R5; 11	BAT; R6	BAT; R7								14th	183
2021	MW Motorsport	27	Nissan Altima L33	BAT; R1; DNS	BAT; R2; 1	TOW; R3; 6	TOW; R4; 6	TOW2; R5; 4	TOW2; R6; 11	SMP; R7; 1	SMP; R8; C	BAT; R9; 5	BAT; R10; Ret					6th	807
2022	MW Motorsport	27	Nissan Altima L33	SMP; R1; 15	SMP; R2; 5	BAR; R3; 3	BAR; R4; 1	TOW; R5; 1	TOW; R6; Ret	**SAN**; **R7**; **17**	SAN; R8; 4	BAT; R9; 2	BAT; R10; C	ADE; R11; 5	ADE; R12; 5			4th	1134

=== Supercars Championship results ===
Supercars results
Year	Team	No.	Car	1	2	3	4	5	6	7	8	9	10	11	12	13	14	15	16	17	18	19	20	21	22	23	24	25	26	27	28	29	30	31	32	33	34	Position	Points
2020	Garry Rogers Motorsport	40	Holden ZB Commodore	ADE; R1	ADE; R2	MEL; R3	MEL; R4	MEL; R5	MEL; R6	SMP1; R7	SMP1; R8	SMP1; R9	SMP2; R10	SMP2; R11	SMP2; R12	HID1; R13	HID1; R14	HID1; R15	HID2; R16	HID2; R17	HID2; R18	TOW1; R19	TOW1; R20	TOW1; R21	TOW2; R22	TOW2; R23	TOW2; R24	BEN1; R25	BEN1; R26	BEN1; R27	BEN2; R28	BEN2; R29	BEN2; R30	BAT; R31; 19				44th	96
2022	Team 18	20	Holden ZB Commodore	SYD; R1	SYD; R2	SYM; R6	SYM; R7	SYM; R8	MEL; R6	MEL; R7	MEL; R8	MEL; R9	WAN; R10	WAN; R11	WAN; R12	WIN; R13	WIN; R14	WIN; R15	HID; R16	HID; R17	HID; R18	TOW; R19	TOW; R20	BEN; R21	BEN; R22	BEN; R23	SAN; R24; PO	SAN; R25; PO	SAN; R26; PO	PUK; R27	PUK; R28	PUK; R29	BAT; R30; 16	SUR; R31	SUR; R32	ADE; R33	ADE; R34	46th	114
2023	Tickford Racing	56	Ford Mustang S650	NEW; R1	NEW; R2	MEL; R3	MEL; R4	MEL; R5	MEL; R6	BAR; R7	BAR; R8	BAR; R9	SYM; R10	SYM; R11	SYM; R12	HID; R13	HID; R14	HID; R15	TOW; R16	TOW; R17	SMP; R18	SMP; R19	BEN; R20	BEN; R21	BEN; R22	SAN; R23; 13	BAT; R24; 18	SUR; R25	SUR; R26	ADE; R27	ADE; R28							40th	234
2024	Tickford Racing	55	Ford Mustang S650	BAT1; R1	BAT1; R2	MEL; R3	MEL; R4	MEL; R5	MEL; R6	TAU; R7	TAU; R8	BAR; R9	BAR; R10	HID; R11	HID; R12	TOW; R13	TOW; R14	SMP; R15	SMP; R16	BEN; R17	BEN; R18	SAN; R19; 13	BAT; R20; 11	SUR; R21	SUR; R22	ADE; R23	ADE; R24											35th	276

=== Complete Bathurst 12 Hour results ===
Year	Team	Co-drivers	Car	Class	Laps	Pos.	Class pos.
2018	MARC Cars Australia	(Australia) Grant Denyer (Australia) Garry Jacobson	MARC Mazda 3 V8	I-INV	244	25th	**3rd**
2020	MARC Cars Australia	(United Kingdom) James Kaye (Australia) Hadrian Morrall	Ford Mustang MARC II V8	I-INV	0	DNS	DNS

=== Complete Bathurst 1000 results ===
Year	Team	Car	Co-driver	Position	Laps
2020	Garry Rogers Motorsport	Holden Commodore ZB	(Australia) Jayden Ojeda	19th	121
2022	Charlie Schwerkolt Racing	Holden Commodore ZB	(Australia) Scott Pye	16th	161
2023	Tickford Racing	Ford Mustang S650	(Australia) Declan Fraser	18th	160
2024	Tickford Racing	Ford Mustang S650	(Australia) Thomas Randle	11th	161

Awards and achievements
Preceded by Thomas Randle	Mike Kable Young Gun Award; 2019	Succeeded by Matt McLean
