= Cameron Shields =

Australian racing driver

- Nationality: (Australia) Australian
- Born: 15 December 2000 (age 25) Toowoomba, Queensland, Australia

Indy Pro 2000 career
- Debut season: 2021
- Current team: DEForce Racing
- Categorisation: FIA Silver
- Car number: 7
- Starts: 4
- Wins: 0
- Poles: 0
- Fastest laps: 0
- Best finish: 15th in 2021

Previous series
- 2019–20 2018 2017–18 2015–18 2016 2016: U.S. F2000 National Championship; Australian F3 Premier Series; Australian F4 Championship; Australian Formula Ford Series; Australian F3 Premier Series; Australian F3 Premier Series - National Class

Championship titles
- 2016: Australian F3 Premier Series - National Class

Cameron Shields (born 15 December 2000) is an Australian racing driver. He currently competes in the IMSA Sportscar Championship with Performance Tech Motorsports.

== Racing Record ==
=== Career summary ===
| Season | Series | Team | Races | Wins | Poles | F/Laps | Podiums | Points | Position |
|---|---|---|---|---|---|---|---|---|---|
| 2015 | Australian Formula Ford Series | N/A | 3 | 0 | 0 | 0 | 0 | 28 | 20th |
| 2016 | Australian Formula 3 Premier Series - National Class | Gilmour Racing | 15 | 13 | 5 | 12 | 13 | 213 | **1st** |
| 2016 | Australian Formula 3 Premier Series | Gilmour Racing | 6 | 0 | 0 | 1 | 6 | 63 | 5th |
| 2016 | Australian Formula Ford Series | N/A | 3 | 0 | 0 | 0 | 0 | 33 | 19th |
| 2017 | Australian Formula 4 Championship | Team BRM | 21 | 4 | 1 | 5 | 12 | 276 | **3rd** |
| 2017 | Australian Formula Ford Series | BF Racing | 17 | 8 | 0 | 2 | 12 | 231 | **2nd** |
| 2018 | Australian Formula 4 Championship | Team BRM | 15 | 2 | 2 | 2 | 11 | 242 | 4th |
| 2018 | Australian Formula Ford Series | BF Racing | 12 | 0 | 0 | 0 | 2 | 108 | 11th |
| 2018 | Australian Formula 3 Premier Series | Gilmour Racing | 18 | 7 | 3 | 11 | 18 | 239 | **2nd** |
| 2019 | U.S. F2000 National Championship | Newman Wachs Racing | 9 | 1 | 0 | 1 | 2 | 137 | 13th |
| 2020 | U.S. F2000 National Championship | Legacy Autosport | 6 | 0 | 0 | 0 | 0 | 214 | 9th |
| 2020 | U.S. F2000 National Championship | DEForce Racing | 10 | 0 | 1 | 0 | 2 | 214 | 9th |
| 2021 | Indy Pro 2000 Championship | DEForce Racing | 4 | 0 | 0 | 0 | 0 | 43 | 15th |
| 2022 | IMSA SportsCar Championship - LMP3 | Mühlner Motorsports America | 1 | 0 | 0 | 0 | 0 | 1158 | 11th |
| 2022 | IMSA SportsCar Championship - LMP3 | Performance Tech Motorsports | 4 | 0 | 0 | 0 | 2 | 1158 | 11th |
| 2023 | IMSA SportsCar Championship - LMP3 | Performance Tech Motorsports | 2 | 0 | 0 | 0 | 1 | 285 | 29th |
| 2023 | Michelin Pilot Challenge - GS | CarBahn with Peregrine Racing | 1 | 0 | 0 | 0 | 0 | 40 | 68th |
| 2024 | Lamborghini Super Trofeo North America - Pro-Am | Forte Racing | | | | | | | |
| 2025 | Michelin Pilot Challenge - GS | CarBahn with Peregrine Racing | | | | | | | |
| 2026 | Michelin Pilot Challenge - GS | CarBahn with Peregrine Racing | | | | | | | |

*Season still in progress.

=== Complete Australian Formula 4 Championship results ===
(key) (Races in bold indicate pole position) (Races in italics indicate fastest lap)

| Year | Team | 1 | 2 | 3 | 4 | 5 | 6 | 7 | 8 | 9 | 10 | 11 | 12 | 13 | 14 | 15 | 16 | 17 | 18 | 19 | 20 | 21 | DC | Points |
|---|---|---|---|---|---|---|---|---|---|---|---|---|---|---|---|---|---|---|---|---|---|---|---|---|
| 2017 | Team BRM | SAN1; 1 Ret | SAN1; 2 Ret | SAN1; 3; 2 | SAN2; 1; 2 | SAN2; 2; 3 | SAN2; 3; 5 | BAR; 1; 1 | BAR; 2; 5 | BAR; 3; 1 | PHI; 1; 2 | PHI; 2; 8 | PHI; 3; 3 | QLD; 1; 2 | QLD; 2; 1 | QLD; 3; 7 | **SYD**; **1**; 1 | SYD; 2; 2 | **SYD**; **3**; 2 | SUR; 1; 11 | SUR; 2 Ret | SUR; 3; 6 | 3rd | 276 |
| 2018 | Team BRM | **SYM**; **1**; 1 | SYM; 2; 2 | **SYM**; **3**; 1 | PHI; 1; 2 | PHI; 2; 2 | PHI; 3 Ret | QLD; 1; 2 | QLD; 2; 4 | QLD; 3; 2 | WIN1; 1; 2 | WIN1; 2; 2 | WIN1; 3; 4 | **WIN2**; **1**; 7 | WIN2; 2; 2 | **WIN2**; **3**; 2 | SYD; 1 | SYD; 2 | SYD; 3 | PUK; 1 | PUK; 2 | PUK; 3 | 4th | 242 |

=== Complete WeatherTech SportsCar Championship results ===
(key) (Races in bold indicate pole position; results in italics indicate fastest lap)

| Year | Team | Class | Make | Engine | 1 | 2 | 3 | 4 | 5 | 6 | 7 | Pos. | Points |
|---|---|---|---|---|---|---|---|---|---|---|---|---|---|
| 2022 | Mühlner Motorsports America | LMP3 | Duqueine M30 - D08 | Nissan VK56DE 5.6 L V8 | DAY; 6 | | | | | | | 11th | 1158 |
| 2022 | Performance Tech Motorsports | LMP3 | Ligier JS P320 | Nissan VK56DE 5.6 L V8 | | SEB; 3 | MOH | WGL; 3 | MOS | ELK; 6 | PET; 8 | 11th | 1158 |
| 2023 | Performance Tech Motorsports | LMP3 | Ligier JS P320 | Nissan VK56DE 5.6 L V8 | DAY; 3 | SEB | WGL | MOS | ELK | IMS | PET; 5 | 29th | 285 |

=== American open-wheel racing results ===
==== U.S. F2000 National Championship ====
(key) (Races in bold indicate pole position) (Races in italics indicate fastest lap) (Races with * indicate most race laps led)

| Year | Team | 1 | 2 | 3 | 4 | 5 | 6 | 7 | 8 | 9 | 10 | 11 | 12 | 13 | 14 | 15 | 16 | 17 | Rank | Points |
|---|---|---|---|---|---|---|---|---|---|---|---|---|---|---|---|---|---|---|---|---|
| 2019 | Newman Wachs Racing | STP; 1; 11 | STP; 2; 16 | IMS; 1; 5 | IMS; 2; 16 | LOR; 1* | ROA; 1; 3 | ROA; 2; 9 | TOR; 1; 17 | TOR; 2; 6 | MOH; 1 | MOH; 2 | POR; 1 | POR; 2 | LAG; 1 | LAG; 1 | | | 13th | 137 |
| 2020 | Legacy Autosport | ROA; 1; 7 | ROA; 2; 6 | MOH; 1; 9 | MOH; 2; 9 | MOH; 3 DNS | LOR; 12 | | | | | | | | | | | | 9th | 214 |
| 2020 | DEForce Racing | | | | | | | IMS; 1; 11 | IMS; 2; 13 | IMS; 3; 7 | MOH; 4; 6 | MOH; 5; 3 | MOH; 6; 5 | NJMP; 1; 6 | NJMP; 2; 2 | NJMP; 3; 6 | **STP**; **1**; 18 | STP; 2; 19 | 9th | 214 |

==== Indy Pro 2000 Championship ====
(key) (Races in bold indicate pole position) (Races in italics indicate fastest lap) (Races with * indicate most race laps led)

| Year | Team | 1 | 2 | 3 | 4 | 5 | 6 | 7 | 8 | 9 | 10 | 11 | 12 | 13 | 14 | 15 | 16 | 17 | 18 | Rank | Points |
|---|---|---|---|---|---|---|---|---|---|---|---|---|---|---|---|---|---|---|---|---|---|
| 2021 | DEForce Racing | ALA; 4 | ALA; 15 | STP; 14 | STP; 10 | IMS | IMS | IMS | LOR | ROA | ROA | MOH | MOH | GMP | NJM | NJM | NJM | MOH | MOH | 15th | 43 |
