= 2016 in motorsport =

The following is an overview of the events of 2016 in motorsport, including the major racing events, award ceremonies, motorsport venues that were opened and closed during a year, championships and non-championship events that were established and disestablished in a year, and births and deaths of racing drivers and other motorsport people.

== Annual events ==
=== Sporting events ===
The calendar includes only annual major non-championship events or annual events that had significance separate from the championship. For the dates of the championship events see related season articles.

Date	Event	Ref
2–16 January	38th Dakar Rally	
30–31 January	54th 24 Hours of Daytona	
21 February	58th Daytona 500	
28–29 May	44th 24 Hours of Nürburgring	
29 May	74th Monaco Grand Prix	
29 May	100th Indianapolis 500	
4–10 June	98th Isle of Man TT	
18–19 June	84th 24 Hours of Le Mans	
30–31 July	68th 24 Hours of Spa	
31 July	39th Suzuka 8 Hours	
21 August	26th Masters of Formula 3	
9 October	59th Supercheap Auto Bathurst 1000	
20 November	63rd Macau Grand Prix	

=== Award ceremonies ===
Date	Event	Ref
2 December	FIA Prize Giving Ceremony	

== Established championships/events ==
First race	Championship	Ref
7 February	Intercontinental GT Challenge	
27 March	BRDC British Formula 3 Championship	
2 April	Touring Car Endurance Series	
3 April	TCR Spanish Series	
16 April	ADAC TCR Germany Touring Car Championship	
14 May	GT3 Le Mans Cup	
21 May	TCR Thailand Touring Car Championship	
21 May	TCR Benelux Touring Car Championship	
11 June	F4 Spanish Championship	
2 July	Formula 4 United States Championship	
5 August	Formula 4 South East Asia Championship	
18 November	2016–17 Formula 4 UAE Championship	

== Disestablished championships/events ==
Last race	Championship	Ref
9 October	Auto GP	
16 October	European Junior Cup	
23 October	Renault Sport Trophy	
27 November	GP2 Series	

== Opened motorsport venues ==
Date	Venue	First event	Ref
23 April	Paris Street Circuit	Paris ePrix	
21 May	Berlin Street Circuit	Berlin ePrix	
19 June	Baku City Circuit	European Grand Prix	
9 October	Hong Kong Central Harbourfront Circuit	Hong Kong ePrix	

== Closed motorsport venues ==
Date	Venue	Last event	Ref
3 July	Battersea Park Street Circuit	London ePrix	

== Deaths ==
Date	Month	Name	Age	Nationality	Occupation	Note	Ref
8	January	Maria Teresa de Filippis	89	Italian	Racing driver	First female Formula One driver	
13	January	Mike Salmon	82	British	Racing driver		
16	January	Bob Harkey	85	American	Racing driver		
19	January	Mike MacDowel	83	British	Racing driver		
26	January	Barney Hall	83	American	Motorsport commentator	Specialised on NASCAR	
4	February	Dave Mirra	41	American	Racing driver		
10	February	Lennie Pond	75	American	Racing driver		
3	March	Alan Henry	68	British	Motorsport journalist		
7	March	Bobby Johns	83	American	Racing driver		
26	March	Yoshimi Katayama	75	Japanese	Racing driver		
31	March	Bertil Roos	72	Swedish	Racing driver and instructor		
23	April	Attila Ferjáncz	69	Hungarian	Rally driver	Hungarian Rally champion (1976–1982, 1985, 1990)	
29	April	Don White	89	American	Racing driver		
14	May	Andre Wicky	87	Swiss	Racing driver and team owner		
21	May	Eddie Keizan	71	South African	Racing driver		
28	June	Andre Guelfi	97	French	Racing driver		
29	June	Carl Haas	87	American	Racing driver and team owner		
7	July	Peter Riley	85	British	Rally driver		
3	August	Chris Amon	73	New Zealander	Racing driver	Winner of the 1966 24 Hours of Le Mans	
7	August	Bryan Clauson	27	American	Racing driver		
7	August	Jack Sears	86	British	Race and rally driver	First BTCC champion	
9	August	Bill Alsup	78	American	Racing driver		
2	September	Blackie Gejeian	90	American	Racing driver	Also known as hot rod builder	
8	September	Hannes Arch	48	Austrian	Air racer	Red Bull Air World Race champion (2008).	
10	October	Tony Adamowicz	75	American	Racing driver		
24	October	Jack Sellers	72	American	Racing driver		
15	November	Paul Rosche	82	German	Engineer		
19	November	Jacques Henry	74	French	Rally driver		
10	December	Herm Johnson	63	American	Racing driver		

== See also ==
- List of 2016 motorsport champions
