= List of 2016 motorsport champions =

2016 motorsport champions
Previous: 2015	Next: 2017

This list of 2016 motorsport champions is a list of national or international auto racing series with championships decided by the points or positions earned by a driver from multiple races where the season was completed during the 2016 calendar year.

== Air racing ==
Series	Rider	refer
Red Bull Air Race World Championship	(Germany) Matthias Dolderer	2016 Red Bull Air Race World Championship
Red Bull Air Race World Championship	Challenger: (Germany) Florian Bergér	2016 Red Bull Air Race World Championship

== Dirt oval racing ==
Series	Champion(s)	refer
All Star Circuit of Champions	(United States) Chad Kemenah	2016 Arctic Cat All Star Circuit of Champions
Lucas Oil Late Model Dirt Series	(United States) Scott Bloomquist	2016 Lucas Oil Late Model Dirt Series
National Sprint League	(United States) Danny Lasoski	2016 FVP National Sprint League
Super DIRTcar Series	(United States) Matt Sheppard	2016 Super DIRTcar Series
UMP Summer Nationals	(United States) Bobby Pierce	2016 UMP DIRTcar Summer Nationals
USAC Silver Crown Series	(United States) Chris Windom	2016 USAC Silver Crown Series
World of Outlaws Sprint Cars	(United States) Donny Schatz	2016 World of Outlaws Craftsman Sprint Car Series
World of Outlaws Late Models	(United States) Josh Richards	2016 World of Outlaws Craftsman Late Model Series

== Drag racing ==
Series	Rider	refer
NHRA Mello Yello Drag Racing Series	Top Fuel: (United States) Antron Brown	2016 NHRA Mello Yello Drag Racing Series
NHRA Mello Yello Drag Racing Series	Funny Car: (United States) Ron Capps	2016 NHRA Mello Yello Drag Racing Series
NHRA Mello Yello Drag Racing Series	Pro Stock: (United States) Jason Line	2016 NHRA Mello Yello Drag Racing Series
NHRA Mello Yello Drag Racing Series	Pro Stock Motorcycle: (United States) Gerald Savole	2016 NHRA Mello Yello Drag Racing Series
European Drag Racing Championship	Top Fuel: (Finland) Anita Mäkelä	
European Drag Racing Championship	Top Methanol Dragster: (Sweden) Jonny Lagg	
European Drag Racing Championship	Top Methanol Funny Car: (Finland) Johnny Oksa	
European Drag Racing Championship	Pro Stock Car: (Sweden) Jimmy Ålund	
European Drag Racing Championship	Pro Stock Modified: (Sweden) Michael Gullqvist	

== Drifting ==
Series	Champion	Refer
British Drift Championship	(Republic of Ireland) Jack Shanahan	2016 British Drift Championship
British Drift Championship	Semi-Pro: (United Kingdom) Danny Grundy	2016 British Drift Championship
D1 Grand Prix	(Japan) Daigo Saito	2016 D1 Grand Prix series
D1 Grand Prix	D1SL: (Japan) Katsuhiro Ueo	2016 D1 Grand Prix series
D1NZ	(New Zealand) Curt Whittaker	2016 D1NZ season
D1NZ	Pro-Sport: (New Zealand) Chad McKenzie	2016 D1NZ season
Drift Allstars	(Republic of Ireland) James Deane	2016 Drift Allstars
Drift Masters	(Poland) Piotr Więcek	2016 Drift Masters
Formula D	(United States) Chris Forsberg	2016 Formula D season
Formula D	PROSPEC: (Canada) Marc Landerville	2016 Formula D season
Formula D	Manufacturers: (Japan) Scion	2016 Formula D season
Formula D	Tire Cup: (Japan) Falken	2016 Formula D season

== Karting ==
Series	Driver	Season article
CIK-FIA Karting World Championship	OK: (Spain) Pedro Hiltbrand	
CIK-FIA Karting World Championship	OKJ: (France) Victor Martins	
CIK-FIA Karting World Championship	KZ: (Italy) Paolo De Conto	
CIK-FIA Karting World Championship	KZ2: (Spain) Pedro Hiltbrand	
CIK-FIA Karting Academy Trophy	(United Kingdom) Callum Bradshaw	2016 CIK-FIA Karting Academy Trophy
CIK-FIA Karting European Championship	OK: (Spain) Pedro Hiltbrand	
CIK-FIA Karting European Championship	OK-J: (United Kingdom) Finlay Kenneally	
CIK-FIA Karting European Championship	KZ: (Italy) Marco Ardigò	
CIK-FIA Karting European Championship	KZ2: (Italy) Fabian Federer	
WSK Champions Cup	KZ2: (Italy) Paolo De Conto	
WSK Champions Cup	OK: (United States) Logan Sargeant	
WSK Champions Cup	OKJ: (United Kingdom) Kiern Jewiss	
WSK Champions Cup	60 Mini: (Italy) Michael Barbaro Paparo	
Rotax Max Challenge	DD2: (Hungary) Ferenc Kancsar	
Rotax Max Challenge	DD2 Masters: (Australia) Lee Mitchener	
Rotax Max Challenge	Senior: (Russia) Denis Mavlanov	
Rotax Max Challenge	Junior: (United Kingdom) Mark Kimber	
Rotax Max Challenge	Mini: (South Africa) Jayden Els	
Rotax Max Challenge	Micro: (United States) Diego Laroque	
Rotax Max Challenge	Nations Cup: Canada	

== Motorcycle racing ==
Series	Rider	refer
MotoGP World Championship	(Spain) Marc Márquez	2016 MotoGP season
MotoGP World Championship	Manufacturers: (Japan) Honda	2016 MotoGP season
MotoGP World Championship	Teams: (Japan) Movistar Yamaha MotoGP	2016 MotoGP season
Moto2 World Championship	(France) Johann Zarco	2016 Moto2 season
Moto2 World Championship	Constructors: (Germany) Kalex	2016 Moto2 season
Moto3 World Championship	(South Africa) Brad Binder	2016 Moto3 season
Moto3 World Championship	Constructors: (Austria) KTM	2016 Moto3 season
British Superbike Championship	(United Kingdom) Shane Byrne	2016 British Superbike Championship
British Superbike Championship	Riders Cup: (United Kingdom) Peter Hickman	2016 British Superbike Championship
European Junior Cup	(Spain) Mika Pérez	2016 European Junior Cup
FIM CEV Moto2 European Championship	(South Africa) Steven Odendaal	2016 FIM CEV Moto2 European Championship
FIM CEV Moto3 Junior World Championship	(Italy) Lorenzo Dalla Porta	2016 FIM CEV Moto3 Junior World Championship
FIM Superstock 1000 Cup	(Italy) Raffaele De Rosa	2016 FIM Superstock 1000 Cup
FIM Superstock 1000 Cup	Constructors: (Italy) Ducati	2016 FIM Superstock 1000 Cup
Red Bull MotoGP Rookies Cup	(Japan) Ayumu Sasaki	2016 Red Bull MotoGP Rookies Cup
Superbike World Championship	(United Kingdom) Jonathan Rea	2016 Superbike World Championship
Superbike World Championship	Constructors: (Japan) Kawasaki	2016 Superbike World Championship
Supersport World Championship	(Turkey) Kenan Sofuoğlu	2016 Supersport World Championship
Supersport World Championship	Manufacturers: (Japan) Kawasaki	2016 Supersport World Championship
Australian Superbike Championship	(Australia) Troy Herfoss	

=== Dirt racing ===
Series	Rider	refer
Elite League	Wolverhampton Wolves	2016 Elite League
FIM Cross-Country Rallies World Championship	(Chile) Pablo Quintanilla	2016 FIM Cross-Country Rallies World Championship
FIM Motocross World Championship	MXGP: (Slovenia) Tim Gajser; Manufacturers: (Japan) Honda	2016 FIM Motocross World Championship
FIM Motocross World Championship	MX2: (Netherlands) Jeffrey Herlings; Manufacturers: (Austria) KTM	2016 FIM Motocross World Championship
Sidecarcross World Championship	(Belgium) Jan Hendrickx (Netherlands) Ben van den Bogaart	2016 Sidecarcross World Championship

== Open wheel racing ==
Series	Champion	refer
FIA Formula One World Championship	(Germany) Nico Rosberg	2016 Formula One World Championship
FIA Formula One World Championship	Constructors: (Germany) Mercedes	2016 Formula One World Championship
GP2 Series	(France) Pierre Gasly	2016 GP2 Series
GP2 Series	Teams: (Italy) Prema Racing	2016 GP2 Series
GP3 Series	(Monaco) Charles Leclerc	2016 GP3 Series
GP3 Series	Teams: (France) ART Grand Prix	2016 GP3 Series
IndyCar Series	(France) Simon Pagenaud	2016 IndyCar Series
IndyCar Series	Manufacturers: (United States) Chevrolet	2016 IndyCar Series
IndyCar Series	Rookie: (United States) Alexander Rossi	2016 IndyCar Series
Formula E	(Switzerland) Sébastien Buemi	2015-16 Formula E season
Formula E	Teams: (France) Renault e.DAMS	2015-16 Formula E season
Formula V8 3.5	(France) Tom Dillmann	2016 Formula V8 3.5 Series
Formula V8 3.5	Teams: (United Kingdom) Arden Motorsport	2016 Formula V8 3.5 Series
Atlantic Championship	(United States) Ryan Norman	2016 Atlantic Championship season
Auto GP Formula Open Championship	(Mexico) Luis Michael Dörrbecker	2016 Auto GP Formula Open Championship
BOSS GP Series	Open Class: (Austria) Ingo Gerstl	2016 BOSS GP Series
BOSS GP Series	Formula Class: (France) Christopher Brenier	2016 BOSS GP Series
F2000 Italian Formula Trophy	(Italy) Andrea Fontana	2016 F2000 Italian Formula Trophy
Formula Masters China	(Germany) Philip Hamprecht	2016 Formula Masters China
Formula Masters China	Teams: (Hong Kong) Absolute Racing	2016 Formula Masters China
Formula Masters China	Masters: (Japan) Takashi Hata	2016 Formula Masters China
FIA Masters Historic Formula One Championship	Fittipaldi/Stewart: (United Kingdom) Michael Lyons	2016 FIA Masters Historic Formula One Championship
FIA Masters Historic Formula One Championship	Head/Lauda: (United Kingdom) Nick Padmore	2016 FIA Masters Historic Formula One Championship
Formula STCC Nordic	(Sweden) Linus Lundqvist	2016 Formula STCC Nordic season
Indy Lights	(United Arab Emirates) Ed Jones	2016 Indy Lights
MRF Challenge Formula 2000 Championship	(Brazil) Pietro Fittipaldi	2015–16 MRF Challenge Formula 2000 Championship season
Pro Mazda Championship	(United States) Aaron Telitz	2016 Pro Mazda Championship
Super Formula Championship	(Japan) Yuji Kunimoto	2016 Super Formula Championship
Super Formula Championship	Teams: (Japan) P.mu/cerumo・INGING	2016 Super Formula Championship
Toyota Racing Series	(United Kingdom) Lando Norris	2016 Toyota Racing Series
Formula Three
FIA Formula 3 European Championship	(Canada) Lance Stroll	2016 FIA Formula 3 European Championship
FIA Formula 3 European Championship	Teams: (Italy) Prema Powerteam	2016 FIA Formula 3 European Championship
FIA Formula 3 European Championship	Rookies: (Sweden) Joel Eriksson	2016 FIA Formula 3 European Championship
All-Japan Formula Three Championship	(Japan) Kenta Yamashita	2016 All-Japan Formula Three Championship
All-Japan Formula Three Championship	Teams: (Japan) TOM'S	2016 All-Japan Formula Three Championship
All-Japan Formula Three Championship	National Class: (Japan) Yoshiaki Katayama	2016 All-Japan Formula Three Championship
All-Japan Formula Three Championship	Engine Tuners: (Germany) Spiess Motorenbau (Volkswagen)	2016 All-Japan Formula Three Championship
Australian Formula 3 Championship	(Australia) Tim Macrow	2016 Australian Formula 3 Championship
Australian Formula 3 Championship	National Class: (Australia) Cameron Shields	2016 Australian Formula 3 Championship
Australian Formula 3 Championship	Kumho Cup: (Australia) Shane Wilson	2016 Australian Formula 3 Championship
Fórmula 3 Brasil	(Brazil) Matheus Iorio	2016 Formula 3 Brasil season
Fórmula 3 Brasil	Teams: (Brazil) Cesário F3	2016 Formula 3 Brasil season
Fórmula 3 Brasil	Class B: (Brazil) Pedro Caland	2016 Formula 3 Brasil season
BRDC British Formula 3 Championship	(Brazil) Matheus Leist	2016 BRDC British Formula 3 Championship
Chilean Formula Three Championship	(Chile) Alex Renner	2016 Chilean Formula Three Championship
Euroformula Open Championship	(Italy) Leonardo Pulcini	2016 Euroformula Open Championship
Euroformula Open Championship	R: (Austria) Ferdinand Habsburg	2016 Euroformula Open Championship
Euroformula Open Championship	Teams: (Spain) Campos Racing	2016 Euroformula Open Championship
Spanish Formula Three Championship	(Italy) Leonardo Pulcini	2016 Euroformula Open Championship
Spanish Formula Three Championship	Teams: (Spain) Campos Racing	2016 Euroformula Open Championship
MotorSport Vision Formula Three Cup	(United Kingdom) George Line	2016 MotorSport Vision Formula Three Cup
MotorSport Vision Formula Three Cup	Teams: (United Kingdom) CF Racing	2016 MotorSport Vision Formula Three Cup
MotorSport Vision Formula Three Cup	Cup: (United Kingdom) George Line	2016 MotorSport Vision Formula Three Cup
MotorSport Vision Formula Three Cup	Trophy: (United Kingdom) James Ledamun	2016 MotorSport Vision Formula Three Cup
Formula Renault
Eurocup Formula Renault 2.0	(United Kingdom) Lando Norris	2016 Eurocup Formula Renault 2.0
Eurocup Formula Renault 2.0	Teams: (Germany) Josef Kaufmann Racing	2016 Eurocup Formula Renault 2.0
Eurocup Formula Renault 2.0	Rookie: (United Kingdom) Lando Norris	2016 Eurocup Formula Renault 2.0
Formula Renault 2.0 Northern European Cup	(United Kingdom) Lando Norris	2016 Formula Renault 2.0 Northern European Cup
Formula Renault 2.0 Northern European Cup	Teams: (Germany) Josef Kaufmann Racing	2016 Formula Renault 2.0 Northern European Cup
Formula Renault 2.0 Northern European Cup	Rookie: (United Kingdom) Lando Norris	2016 Formula Renault 2.0 Northern European Cup
French F4 Championship	(China) Yifei Ye	2016 French F4 Championship season
French F4 Championship	Junior: (China) Yifei Ye	2016 French F4 Championship season
French F4 Championship	International: (Belgium) Gilles Magnus	2016 French F4 Championship season
Asian Formula Renault Series	(Australia) Josh Burdon	2016 Asian Formula Renault Series
Formula Renault 2.0 Argentina	(Argentina) Rudi Bundziak	2016 Formula Renault 2.0 Argentina
V de V Challenge Monoplace	(Australia) Alex Peroni	2016 V de V Challenge Monoplace
Formula 4
ADAC Formula 4 Championship	(Australia) Joey Mawson	2016 ADAC Formula 4 Championship
ADAC Formula 4 Championship	Teams: (Italy) Prema Powerteam	2016 ADAC Formula 4 Championship
ADAC Formula 4 Championship	Rookie: (Denmark) Nicklas Nielsen	2016 ADAC Formula 4 Championship
Australian Formula 4 Championship	(Australia) Will Brown	2016 Australian Formula 4 Championship
F4 British Championship	(United Kingdom) Max Fewtrell	2016 F4 British Championship
F4 British Championship	Rookie Cup: (United Kingdom) Alex Quinn	2016 F4 British Championship
China Formula 4 Championship (2015-16)	(Colombia) Julio Acosta	2015–16 China Formula 4 Championship
China Formula 4 Championship (2016)	(United States) Bruno Carneiro	2016 China Formula 4 Championship
Italian F4 Championship	(Argentina) Marcos Siebert	2016 Italian F4 Championship
Italian F4 Championship	Rookie: (Estonia) Jüri Vips	2016 Italian F4 Championship
F4 Japanese Championship	(Japan) Ritomo Miyata	2016 F4 Japanese Championship
NACAM Formula 4 Championship	(Mexico) Axel Matus	2015–16 NACAM Formula 4 Championship
SMP F4 Championship	(Netherlands) Richard Verschoor	2016 SMP F4 Championship
F4 Spanish Championship	(Netherlands) Richard Verschoor	2016 F4 Spanish Championship
F4 Spanish Championship	Teams: (Netherlands) MP Motorsport	2016 F4 Spanish Championship
Formula 4 Sudamericana	(Uruguay) Facundo Garese	2016 Formula 4 Sudamericana season
United States Formula 4 Championship	(United States) Cameron Das	2016 Formula 4 United States Championship
JAF Japan Formula 4	East: (Japan) Toshiki Oyu	2016 JAF Japan Formula 4
JAF Japan Formula 4	West: (Japan) Toshiki Oyu	2016 JAF Japan Formula 4
Formula Ford
Australian Formula Ford Series	(Australia) Leanne Tander	2016 Australian Formula Ford Series
F2000 Championship Series	(Canada) Steve Bamford	2016 F2000 Championship Series
Pacific F2000 Championship	(United States) Tim de Silva	2016 Pacific F2000 Championship
U.S. F2000 National Championship	(Australia) Anthony Martin	2016 U.S. F2000 National Championship
F1600 Championship Series	(United States) Neil Verhagen	2016 F1600 Championship Series
New Zealand Formula Ford Championship	(New Zealand) Michael Scott	2015–16 New Zealand Formula Ford Championship
Toyo Tires F1600 Championship Series	(Canada) Michael Adams	2016 Toyo Tires F1600 Championship Series

== Rallying ==
Series	Champion	refer
World Rally Championship	(France) Sébastien Ogier; Co-Driver: (France) Julien Ingrassia	2016 World Rally Championship
World Rally Championship	Manufacturers: (Germany) Volkswagen Motorsport	2016 World Rally Championship
World Rally Championship-2	(Finland) Esapekka Lappi; Co-Driver: (Finland) Janne Ferm	2016 World Rally Championship-2
World Rally Championship-2	Teams: (Czech Republic) Škoda Motorsport	2016 World Rally Championship-2
World Rally Championship-3	(Italy) Simone Tempestini; Co-Driver: (Italy) Giovanni Bernacchini	2016 World Rally Championship-3
World Rally Championship-3	Teams: (France) Saintéloc Junior Team	2016 World Rally Championship-3
Junior World Rally Championship	(Italy) Simone Tempestini; Co-driver: (Italy) Giovanni Bernacchini	2016 Junior World Rally Championship
Junior World Rally Championship	Nations: Italy	2016 Junior World Rally Championship
ADAC Opel Rallye Cup	(Finland) Jari Huttunen	2016 ADAC Opel Rallye Cup
ADAC Opel Rallye Cup	Co-Drivers: (Finland) Antti Linnaketo	2016 ADAC Opel Rallye Cup
African Rally Championship	(Kenya) Don Smith	2016 African Rally Championship
African Rally Championship	Co-Drivers: (Kenya) Bob Kaugi	2016 African Rally Championship
Asia-Pacific Rally Championship	(India) Gaurav Gill; Co-Driver: (Australia) Glenn Macneall	2016 Asia-Pacific Rally Championship
Australian Rally Championship	(Australia) Molly Taylor	2016 Australian Rally Championship
Australian Rally Championship	Co-Drivers: (Australia) Bill Hayes	2016 Australian Rally Championship
British Rally Championship	(United Kingdom) Elfyn Evans; Co-Driver: (United Kingdom) Craig Parry	2016 British Rally Championship
Canadian Rally Championship	(Canada) Antoine L'Estage	2016 Canadian Rally Championship
Canadian Rally Championship	Co-Drivers: (Canada) Darren Garrod	2016 Canadian Rally Championship
Central European Zone Rally Championship	2WD: (Slovenia) Rok Turk	2016 Central European Zone Rally Championship
Central European Zone Rally Championship	Historic: (Hungary) Ferenc Wirtmann	2016 Central European Zone Rally Championship
Codasur South American Rally Championship	(Paraguay) Gustavo Saba	2016 Codasur South American Rally Championship
Czech Rally Championship	(Czech Republic) Jan Kopecký	2016 Czech Rally Championship
Czech Rally Championship	Co-Drivers: (Czech Republic) Pavel Dresler	2016 Czech Rally Championship
Deutsche Rallye Meisterschaft	(Germany) Fabian Kreim	
Drive DMACK Fiesta Trophy	(United Kingdom) Osian Pryce; Co-Driver: (United Kingdom) Dale Furniss	2016 Drive DMACK Fiesta Trophy
Estonian Rally Championship	(Estonia) Egon Kaur	2016 Estonian Rally Championship
Estonian Rally Championship	Co-Drivers: (Estonia) Erik Lepikson	2016 Estonian Rally Championship
European Rally Championship	ERC: (Poland) Kajetan Kajetanowicz	2016 European Rally Championship
European Rally Championship	ERC Teams: (Poland) Lotos Rally Team	2016 European Rally Championship
European Rally Championship	ERC-2: (Poland) Wojciech Chuchała	2016 European Rally Championship
European Rally Championship	ERC-2 Teams: Subaru Poland Rally Team	2016 European Rally Championship
European Rally Championship	ERC-3: (United Kingdom) Chris Ingram	2016 European Rally Championship
European Rally Championship	ERC-3 Teams: (Turkey) Castrol Ford Team Türkiye	2016 European Rally Championship
European Rally Championship	Ladies Trophy: (United Kingdom) Catie Munnings	2016 European Rally Championship
European Rally Championship	ERC Junior: (Germany) Marijan Griebel	2016 European Rally Championship
French Rally Championship	(France) Sylvain Michel	
Hungarian Rally Championship	(Hungary) Norbert Herczig	
Hungarian Rally Championship	Co-Drivers: (Hungary) Igor Bacigál	
Indian National Rally Championship	(India) Karna Kadur	
Indian National Rally Championship	Co-Drivers: (India) Nikhil Pai	
Italian Rally Championship	(Italy) Giandomenico Basso	
Italian Rally Championship	Co-Drivers: (Italy) Lorenzo Granai	
Italian Rally Championship	Manufacturers: (United States) Ford	
Middle East Rally Championship	(Qatar) Nasser Al-Attiyah	
NACAM Rally Championship	(Mexico) Ricardo Triviño	2016 NACAM Rally Championship
NACAM Rally Championship	Co-Drivers: (Mexico) Marco Hernández	2016 NACAM Rally Championship
New Zealand Rally Championship	(New Zealand) David Holder	2016 New Zealand Rally Championship
New Zealand Rally Championship	Co-Drivers: (New Zealand) Jason Farmer	2016 New Zealand Rally Championship
Polish Rally Championship	(Poland) Grzegorz Grzyb	
Rally America	(United Kingdom) David Higgins	2016 Rally America season
Rally America	Co-Drivers: (United Kingdom) Craig Drew	2016 Rally America season
Romanian Rally Championship	(Romania) Simone Tempestini	
Scottish Rally Championship	(United Kingdom) Jock Armstrong	2016 Scottish Rally Championship
Scottish Rally Championship	Co-Drivers: (United Kingdom) Paula Swinscoe	2016 Scottish Rally Championship
Slovak Rally Championship	(Czech Republic) Pavel Valoušek	
Slovak Rally Championship	Co-Drivers: (Czech Republic) Veronika Havelková	
South African National Rally Championship	(South Africa) Leeroy Poulter	
South African National Rally Championship	Co-Drivers: (South Africa) Elvene Coetzee	
South African National Rally Championship	Manufacturers: (Japan) Toyota	
Spanish Rally Championship	(Spain) Cristian García	
Spanish Rally Championship	Co-Drivers: (Spain) Rebeca Liso	

=== Rallycross ===
Series	Champion	refer
FIA World Rallycross Championship	(Sweden) Mattias Ekström	2016 FIA World Rallycross Championship
FIA World Rallycross Championship	Teams: (Sweden) EKS RX	2016 FIA World Rallycross Championship
FIA European Rallycross Championship	SuperCars: (Sweden) Kevin Hansen	2016 European Rallycross Championship
FIA European Rallycross Championship	Super1600s: (Hungary) Krisztián Szabó	2016 European Rallycross Championship
FIA European Rallycross Championship	TouringCars: (Norway) Ben-Philip Gundersen	2016 European Rallycross Championship
Global RallyCross Championship	(United States) Scott Speed	2016 Global RallyCross Championship
Global RallyCross Championship	GRC Lites: (United States) Cabot Bigham	2016 Global RallyCross Championship
Global RallyCross Championship	Manufacturers: (Germany) Volkswagen	2016 Global RallyCross Championship
British Rallycross Championship	(United Kingdom) Dan Rooke	

=== Rally raid ===
Series	Champion	refer
FIA Cross Country Rally World Cup	(Qatar) Nasser Al-Attiyah; Co-Driver: (France) Mathieu Baumel	2016 FIA Cross Country Rally World Cup

=== Ice racing ===
Series	Champion	refer
Andros Trophy	Elite Pro: (France) Jean-Baptiste Dubourg	2015-16 Andros Trophy
Andros Trophy	Elite: (France) Eddy Bénézet	2015-16 Andros Trophy
Andros Trophy	Électrique: (France) Matthieu Vaxivière	2015-16 Andros Trophy
Andros Trophy	Féminin: (France) Clémentine Lhoste	2015-16 Andros Trophy
Andros Trophy	AMV Cup: (France) Sylvain Dabert	2015-16 Andros Trophy

== Sports car and GT ==
Series	Champion(s)	refer
FIA GT World Cup	(Belgium) Laurens Vanthoor; Manufacturer: (Germany) Audi	2016 FIA GT World Cup
FIA World Endurance Championship	(Germany) Marc Lieb (Switzerland) Neel Jani (France) Romain Dumas	2016 FIA World Endurance Championship
FIA World Endurance Championship	Manufacturers: (Germany) Porsche	2016 FIA World Endurance Championship
FIA World Endurance Championship	GT: (Denmark) Nicki Thiim; GT: (Denmark) Marco Sørensen	2016 FIA World Endurance Championship
FIA World Endurance Championship	GT Manufacturers: (Italy) Ferrari	2016 FIA World Endurance Championship
FIA World Endurance Championship	LMGTE Pro Teams: (United Kingdom) #95 Aston Martin Racing	2016 FIA World Endurance Championship
FIA World Endurance Championship	LMP1 Private: (Austria) Dominik Kraihamer; LMP1 Private: (Switzerland) Alexandre Imperatori; LMP1 Private: (Switzerland) Mathéo Tuscher	2016 FIA World Endurance Championship
FIA World Endurance Championship	LMP1 Private Teams: (Switzerland) #13 Rebellion Racing	2016 FIA World Endurance Championship
FIA World Endurance Championship	LMP2: (United States) Gustavo Menezes; LMP2: (France) Nicolas Lapierre; LMP2: (Monaco) Stéphane Richelmi	2016 FIA World Endurance Championship
FIA World Endurance Championship	LMP2 Teams: (France) #36 Signatech Apline	2016 FIA World Endurance Championship
FIA World Endurance Championship	LMGTE Am: (France) Emmanuel Collard; LMGTE Am: (France) François Perrodo; LMGTE Am: (Portugal) Rui Águas	2016 FIA World Endurance Championship
FIA World Endurance Championship	LMGTE Am Teams: (Italy) #83 AF Corse	2016 FIA World Endurance Championship
ADAC GT Masters	(Germany) Christopher Mies (United States) Connor De Phillippi	2016 ADAC GT Masters
ADAC GT Masters	Junior: (United States) Connor De Phillippi	2016 ADAC GT Masters
ADAC GT Masters	Trophy: (Switzerland) Remo Lips	2016 ADAC GT Masters
ADAC GT Masters	Teams: (Germany) Montaplast by Land-Motorsport	2016 ADAC GT Masters
Asian Le Mans Series	LMP2: (Switzerland) Nicolas Leutwiller	2015-16 Asian Le Mans Series
Asian Le Mans Series	LMP3: (China) David Cheng; LMP3: (China) Ho-Pin Tung	2015-16 Asian Le Mans Series
Asian Le Mans Series	CN: (Singapore) Denis Lian	2015-16 Asian Le Mans Series
Asian Le Mans Series	GT: (Singapore) Weng Sun Mok	2015-16 Asian Le Mans Series
Asian Le Mans Series	GT-AM: (Hong Kong) Paul Ip	2015-16 Asian Le Mans Series
Asian Le Mans Series	LMP2 Teams: (Switzerland) Race Performance	2015-16 Asian Le Mans Series
Asian Le Mans Series	LMP3 Teams: (China) DC Racing	2015-16 Asian Le Mans Series
Asian Le Mans Series	CN Teams: (Singapore) Avelon Formula	2015-16 Asian Le Mans Series
Asian Le Mans Series	GT Teams: (Singapore) Clearwater Racing	2015-16 Asian Le Mans Series
Asian Le Mans Series	GT-AM Teams: (Hong Kong) KCMG	2015-16 Asian Le Mans Series
Audi Sport TT Cup	(Finland) Joonas Lappalainen	2016 Audi Sport TT Cup
Australian GT Championship	(Australia) Klark Quinn	2016 Australian GT Championship
Australian GT Championship	Endurance: (Australia) Grant Denyer; Endurance: (Australia) Nathan Morcom	2016 Australian GT Championship
Australian GT Championship	Trophy: (Australia) Rob Smith	2016 Australian GT Championship
Blancpain GT Sports Club	(Poland) Michał Broniszewski	2016 Blancpain GT Sports Club
Blancpain GT Sports Club	Iron Cup: (Monaco) Martin Lanting	2016 Blancpain GT Sports Club
Blancpain Endurance Series	Pro: (United Kingdom) Rob Bell; Pro: (New Zealand) Shane van Gisbergen; Pro: (France) Côme Ledogar	2016 Blancpain Endurance Series
Blancpain Endurance Series	Pro-Am: (Italy) Alessandro Bonacini; Pro-Am: (Poland) Michal Broniszewski; Pro-Am: (Italy) Andrea Rizzoli	2016 Blancpain Endurance Series
Blancpain Endurance Series	Am: (Russia) Vadim Gitlin; Am: (Australia) Liam Talbot; Am: (Italy) Marco Zanuttini	2016 Blancpain Endurance Series
Blancpain Endurance Series	Pro Teams: (United Kingdom) Garage 59	2016 Blancpain Endurance Series
Blancpain Endurance Series	Pro-Am Teams: (Switzerland) Kessel Racing	2016 Blancpain Endurance Series
Blancpain Endurance Series	Am Teams: (Switzerland) Kessel Racing	2016 Blancpain Endurance Series
Blancpain Sprint Series	(Belgium) Enzo Ide	2016 Blancpain Sprint Series
Blancpain Sprint Series	Teams: (Belgium) Belgian Audi Club Team WRT	2016 Blancpain Sprint Series
Blancpain Sprint Series	Pro-Am: (Poland) Michał Broniszewski; Pro-Am: (Italy) Giacomo Piccini	2016 Blancpain Sprint Series
Blancpain Sprint Series	Pro-Am Teams: (Switzerland) Kessel Racing	2016 Blancpain Sprint Series
Blancpain Sprint Series	Silver Cup: (Italy) Michele Beretta; Silver Cup: (Germany) Luca Stolz	2016 Blancpain Sprint Series
Blancpain Sprint Series	Am: (Germany) Claudio Sdanewitsch	2016 Blancpain Sprint Series
Blancpain Sprint Series	Am Teams: (Italy) AF Corse	2016 Blancpain Sprint Series
British GT Championship	GT3: (United Kingdom) Jonathan Adam; GT3: (United Kingdom) Derek Johnston	2016 British GT Championship
British GT Championship	GT3 Teams: (United Kingdom) TF Sport	2016 British GT Championship
British GT Championship	GT4: (United Kingdom) Graham Johnson; GT4: (United Kingdom) Mike Robinson	2016 British GT Championship
British GT Championship	GT4 Teams: (United Kingdom) RCIB Insurance Racing	2016 British GT Championship
Continental Tire SportsCar Challenge	Grand Sport: (United States) Billy Johnson; Grand Sport: (Canada) Scott Maxwell	2016 Continental Tire SportsCar Challenge
Continental Tire SportsCar Challenge	Grand Sport Teams: #15 Multimatic Motorsports	2016 Continental Tire SportsCar Challenge
Continental Tire SportsCar Challenge	Grand Sport Manufacturers: Ford	2016 Continental Tire SportsCar Challenge
Continental Tire SportsCar Challenge	Street Tuner: (United States) Nick Galante; Street Tuner: (United States) Spencer Pumpelly	2016 Continental Tire SportsCar Challenge
Continental Tire SportsCar Challenge	Street Tuner Teams: #17 RS1	2016 Continental Tire SportsCar Challenge
Continental Tire SportsCar Challenge	Street Tuner Manufacturers: Porsche	2016 Continental Tire SportsCar Challenge
European Le Mans Series	LMP2: (United Kingdom) Simon Dolan; LMP2: (United Kingdom) Harry Tincknell; LMP2: (Netherlands) Giedo van der Garde	2016 European Le Mans Series
European Le Mans Series	LMP2 Teams: (Russia) No. 38 G-Drive Racing	2016 European Le Mans Series
European Le Mans Series	LMP3: (United Kingdom) Alex Brundle; LMP3: (United Kingdom) Christian England; LMP3: (United States) Mike Guasch	2016 European Le Mans Series
European Le Mans Series	LMP3 Teams: (United States) No. 2 United Autosports	2016 European Le Mans Series
European Le Mans Series	GTE: (United Kingdom) Andrew Howard; GTE: (United Kingdom) Alex MacDowall; GTE: (United Kingdom) Darren Turner	2016 European Le Mans Series
European Le Mans Series	GTE Teams: (United Kingdom) No. 99 Aston Martin Racing	2016 European Le Mans Series
Ginetta GT4 Supercup	(United Kingdom) Tom Wrigley	2016 Ginetta GT4 Supercup
Ginetta GT4 Supercup	Amateur: (United Kingdom) Colin White	2016 Ginetta GT4 Supercup
Ginetta Junior Championship	(United Kingdom) Will Tregurtha	2016 Ginetta Junior Championship
GT Asia Series	GT3: (Italy) Edoardo Liberati; GT3: (Italy) Andrea Amici	2016 GT Asia Series
GT Asia Series	GTC: (Thailand) Kantasak Kusiri; GTC: (Thailand) Bhurit Bhirombhakdi	2016 GT Asia Series
GT Asia Series	Pro: (Italy) Edoardo Liberati; Pro: (Italy) Andrea Amici	2016 GT Asia Series
GT Asia Series	Pro-Am: (Hong Kong) Shaun Thong	2016 GT Asia Series
GT Asia Series	Teams: (Hong Kong) Bentley Team Absolute	2016 GT Asia Series
GT3 Le Mans Cup	(Russia) Aleksey Basov (Russia) Viktor Shaitar	2016 GT3 Le Mans Cup
GT3 Le Mans Cup	Teams: (United Kingdom) TF Sport	2016 GT3 Le Mans Cup
GT4 European Series	Pro: (Germany) Peter Terting; Pro: (Germany) Jörg Viebahn	2016 GT4 European Series
GT4 European Series	Am: (France) Jérôme Demay	2016 GT4 European Series
GT4 European Series	Teams: (Germany) PROsport Performance	2016 GT4 European Series
Intercontinental GT Challenge	(Belgium) Laurens Vanthoor	2016 Intercontinental GT Challenge
Intercontinental GT Challenge	Manufacturers: (Germany) Audi	2016 Intercontinental GT Challenge
Italian GT Championship	SuperGT3: (Italy) Stefano Gai; SuperGT3: (Italy) Mirko Venturi	2016 Italian GT Championship
Italian GT Championship	SuperGT3Cup: (Brazil) Nicolas Costa	2016 Italian GT Championship
Italian GT Championship	GT3: (Italy) Eddie Cheever III; GT3: (Italy) Federico Leo	2016 Italian GT Championship
Italian GT Championship	GTCup: (Italy) Ivan Benvenuti; GTCup: (Italy) Luca De Marchi	2016 Italian GT Championship
Italian GT Championship	GT4: (Italy) Dario Cerati	2016 Italian GT Championship
Italian GT Championship	Cayman: (Italy) Riccardo Pera	2016 Italian GT Championship
Pirelli World Challenge	GT: (Portugal) Álvaro Parente	2016 Pirelli World Challenge
Pirelli World Challenge	GT Teams: K-PAX Racing	2016 Pirelli World Challenge
Pirelli World Challenge	GT Manufacturers: (United Kingdom) McLaren	2016 Pirelli World Challenge
Pirelli World Challenge	GTA: (Mexico) Martín Fuentes	2016 Pirelli World Challenge
Pirelli World Challenge	GT Cup: (United States) Alec Udell	2016 Pirelli World Challenge
Pirelli World Challenge	GT Cup Teams: GMG Racing	2016 Pirelli World Challenge
Pirelli World Challenge	GTS: (United States) Brett Sandberg	2016 Pirelli World Challenge
Pirelli World Challenge	GTS Teams: Roush Performance Road Racing	2016 Pirelli World Challenge
Pirelli World Challenge	GTS Manufacturers: (United States) Ford	2016 Pirelli World Challenge
Pirelli World Challenge	TC: (United States) Toby Grahovec	2016 Pirelli World Challenge
Pirelli World Challenge	TC Teams: Classic BMW Motorsports	2016 Pirelli World Challenge
Pirelli World Challenge	TC Manufacturers: (Japan) Mazda	2016 Pirelli World Challenge
Pirelli World Challenge	TCA: (United States) Elivan Goulart	2016 Pirelli World Challenge
Pirelli World Challenge	TCA Teams: S.A.C. Racing	2016 Pirelli World Challenge
Pirelli World Challenge	TCA Manufacturers: (Japan) Mazda	2016 Pirelli World Challenge
Pirelli World Challenge	TCB: (United States) Tom O'Gorman	2016 Pirelli World Challenge
Pirelli World Challenge	TCB Teams: Hale Motorsports	2016 Pirelli World Challenge
Renault Sport Trophy	Pro: (Netherlands) Pieter Schothorst	2016 Renault Sport Trophy
Renault Sport Trophy	Am: (Germany) Fabian Schiller	2016 Renault Sport Trophy
Renault Sport Trophy	Endurance Trophy: (Finland) Markus Palttala; Endurance Trophy: (Germany) Fabian Schiller	2016 Renault Sport Trophy
Renault Sport Trophy	Teams: (Spain) Team Marc VDS EG 0,0	2016 Renault Sport Trophy
Super GT	GT500: (Japan) Kohei Hirate; GT500: (Finland) Heikki Kovalainen	2016 Super GT Series
Super GT	GT300: (Japan) Takamitsu Matsui; GT300: (Japan) Takeshi Tsuchiya	2016 Super GT Series
Super GT	GT500 Teams: (Japan) Lexus Team SARD	2016 Super GT Series
Super GT	GT300 Teams: (Japan) VivaC team Tsuchiya	2016 Super GT Series
Supercar Challenge	Super GT: (Spain) Oliver Campos-Hull; Super GT: (Greece) Kosta Kanaroglou	2016 Supercar Challenge
Supercar Challenge	GTB: (Belgium) Ward Sluys; GTB: (Belgium) Chris Mattheus	2016 Supercar Challenge
Supercar Challenge	Supersport: (Netherlands) Dennis de Borst; Supersport: (Netherlands) Martin de Kleijn	2016 Supercar Challenge
Supercar Challenge	Sport: (Netherlands) Niels Kool; Sport: (Netherlands) Bart Drost	2016 Supercar Challenge
Supercar Challenge	Superlights 1: (Belgium) Luc de Cock; Superlights 1: (Belgium) Tim Joosen	2016 Supercar Challenge
Supercar Challenge	Superlights 2: (Germany) Dominik Dierkes	2016 Supercar Challenge
Toyota Finance 86 Championship	(New Zealand) Ash Blewett	2015-16 Toyota Finance 86 Championship
WeatherTech SportsCar Championship	Prototype: (United States) Dane Cameron; Prototype: (United States) Eric Curran	2016 WeatherTech SportsCar Championship
WeatherTech SportsCar Championship	Prototype Teams: #31 Action Express Racing	2016 WeatherTech SportsCar Championship
WeatherTech SportsCar Championship	Prototype Manufacturers: (United States) Chevrolet	2016 WeatherTech SportsCar Championship
WeatherTech SportsCar Championship	Prototype Challenge: (Venezuela) Alex Popow; Prototype Challenge: (Netherlands) Renger van der Zande	2016 WeatherTech SportsCar Championship
WeatherTech SportsCar Championship	Prototype Challenge Teams: #8 Starworks Motorsport	2016 WeatherTech SportsCar Championship
WeatherTech SportsCar Championship	GT Le Mans: (United Kingdom) Oliver Gavin; GT Le Mans: (United States) Tommy Milner	2016 WeatherTech SportsCar Championship
WeatherTech SportsCar Championship	GT Le Mans Teams: #4 Corvette Racing	2016 WeatherTech SportsCar Championship
WeatherTech SportsCar Championship	GT Le Mans Manufacturers: (United States) Chevrolet	2016 WeatherTech SportsCar Championship
WeatherTech SportsCar Championship	GT Daytona: (Italy) Alessandro Balzan; GT Daytona: (Denmark) Christina Nielsen	2016 WeatherTech SportsCar Championship
WeatherTech SportsCar Championship	GT Daytona Teams: #63 Scuderia Corsa	2016 WeatherTech SportsCar Championship
WeatherTech SportsCar Championship	GT Daytona Manufacturers: (Germany) Audi	2016 WeatherTech SportsCar Championship
Trans-Am Series	TA1: (United States) Amy Ruman	2016 Trans-Am Series
Trans-Am Series	TA2: (United States) Tony Buffomante	2016 Trans-Am Series
Trans-Am Series	TA3: (United States) Randy Mueller	2016 Trans-Am Series
Trans-Am Series	TA4: (United States) Ernie Francis Jr.	2016 Trans-Am Series
Porsche Carrera Cup and GT3 Cup Challenge
Porsche Supercup	(Germany) Sven Muller	2016 Porsche Supercup
Porsche Supercup	Rookie: (France) Mathieu Jaminet	2016 Porsche Supercup
Porsche Supercup	Teams: (Austria) Lechner MSG Racing Team	2016 Porsche Supercup
Porsche Carrera Cup Australia	(Australia) Matt Campbell	2016 Australian Carrera Cup Championship
Porsche Carrera Cup Australia	Challenge: (Australia) Tony Bates	2016 Australian Carrera Cup Championship
Porsche Carrera Cup Germany	(Germany) Sven Müller	2016 Porsche Carrera Cup Germany
Porsche Carrera Cup Germany	Teams: (Germany) Konrad Motorsport	2016 Porsche Carrera Cup Germany
Porsche Carrera Cup Germany	B–Class: (Germany) Wolfgang Triller	2016 Porsche Carrera Cup Germany
Porsche Carrera Cup Germany	Rookie: (Norway) Dennis Olsen	2016 Porsche Carrera Cup Germany
Porsche Carrera Cup Great Britain	(United Kingdom) Dan Cammish	2016 Porsche Carrera Cup Great Britain
Porsche Carrera Cup Great Britain	Pro-Am1: (United Kingdom) Euan McKay	2016 Porsche Carrera Cup Great Britain
Porsche Carrera Cup Great Britain	Pro-Am2: (Lithuania) Tautvydas Barštys	2016 Porsche Carrera Cup Great Britain
Porsche Carrera Cup Italia	(France) Côme Ledogar	2016 Porsche Carrera Cup Italia
Porsche Carrera Cup Italia	Teams: (Italy) Dinamic Motorsport	2016 Porsche Carrera Cup Italia
Porsche Carrera Cup Italia	Michelin Cup: (Italy) Alex de Giacomi	2016 Porsche Carrera Cup Italia
Porsche Carrera Cup France	(France) Mathieu Jaminet	2016 Porsche Carrera Cup France
Porsche Carrera Cup France	Teams: (France) Martinet By Alméras	2016 Porsche Carrera Cup France
Porsche Carrera Cup France	Rookie: (France) Florian Latorre	2016 Porsche Carrera Cup France
Porsche Carrera Cup France	Gentleman: (France) Christophe Lapierre	2016 Porsche Carrera Cup France
Porsche Carrera Cup Scandinavia	(Sweden) Fredrik Larsson	2016 Porsche Carrera Cup Scandinavia
Porsche Carrera Cup Asia	(Germany) Nico Menzel	
Porsche Carrera Cup Asia	Class B: (China) Yuan Bo	
Porsche Carrera Cup Japan	(Japan) Tsubasa Kondo	2016 Porsche Carrera Cup Japan
Porsche Carrera Cup Japan	Gentleman: (Japan) Satoshi Hoshino	2016 Porsche Carrera Cup Japan
IMSA GT3 Cup Challenge	Platinum Class: (Canada) Jesse Lazare	2016 IMSA GT3 Cup Challenge
IMSA GT3 Cup Challenge	Gold Class: TBD	2016 IMSA GT3 Cup Challenge
IMSA GT3 Cup Challenge Canada	Platinum Class: (Canada) Daniel Morad	2016 IMSA GT3 Cup Challenge Canada
IMSA GT3 Cup Challenge Canada	Gold Class: (Canada) Shaun McKaigue	2016 IMSA GT3 Cup Challenge Canada
Porsche GT3 Cup Challenge Australia	(Australia) Hamish Hardeman	2016 Porsche GT3 Cup Challenge Australia
Ferrari Challenge
Finali Mondiali	Trofeo Pirelli Pro: (Venezuela) Carlos Kauffmann; Trofeo Pirelli Pro-Am: (United Kingdom) Sam Smeeth; Coppa Shell Am: (Germany) Thomas Löfflad	2016 Finali Mondiali
Ferrari Challenge Europe	Trofeo Pirelli Pro: (Germany) Björn Grossmann; Trofeo Pirelli Pro-Am: (United Kingdom) Sam Smeeth; Coppa Shell Am: (Germany) Thomas Löfflad	2016 Ferrari Challenge Europe
Ferrari Challenge North America	Trofeo Pirelli Pro: (Venezuela) Carlos Kauffmann; Trofeo Pirelli Pro-Am: (United States) James Weiland; Coppa Shell Am: (United States) Joe Courtney	2016 Ferrari Challenge North America

== Stock car racing ==
Series	Champion(s)	refer
ARCA Racing Series	(United States) Chase Briscoe	2016 ARCA Racing Series
ARCA Truck Series	(United States) Shawn Szep	2016 ARCA Truck Series
Stock Car Brasil Championship	(Brazil) Felipe Fraga	2016 Stock Car Brasil Championship
Turismo Carretera	(Argentina) Guillermo Ortelli	2016 Turismo Carretera Championship
NASCAR
NASCAR Sprint Cup Series	(United States) Jimmie Johnson	2016 NASCAR Sprint Cup Series
NASCAR Sprint Cup Series	Manufacturers: (United States) Chevrolet	2016 NASCAR Sprint Cup Series
NASCAR Xfinity Series	(Mexico) Daniel Suárez	2016 NASCAR Xfinity Series
NASCAR Xfinity Series	Manufacturers: (Japan) Toyota	2016 NASCAR Xfinity Series
NASCAR Camping World Truck Series	(United States) Johnny Sauter	2016 NASCAR Camping World Truck Series
NASCAR Camping World Truck Series	Manufacturers: (Japan) Toyota	2016 NASCAR Camping World Truck Series
NASCAR K&N Pro Series East	(United States) Justin Haley	2016 NASCAR K&N Pro Series East
NASCAR K&N Pro Series West	(United States) Todd Gilliland	2016 NASCAR K&N Pro Series West
NASCAR Pinty's Series	(Canada) Cayden Lapcevich	2016 NASCAR Pinty's Series
NASCAR Pinty's Series	Manufacturers: (United States) Dodge	2016 NASCAR Pinty's Series
NASCAR Whelen Euro Series	Elite 1: (Belgium) Anthony Kumpen	2016 NASCAR Whelen Euro Series
NASCAR Whelen Euro Series	Elite 2: (Belgium) Stienes Longin	2016 NASCAR Whelen Euro Series
NASCAR Whelen Modified Tour	(United States) Doug Coby	2016 NASCAR Whelen Modified Tour
NASCAR Whelen Southern Modified Tour	(United States) Burt Myers	2016 NASCAR Whelen Southern Modified Tour

== Touring car racing ==
Series	Champion	refer
World Touring Car Championship	(Argentina) José María López	2016 World Touring Car Championship
World Touring Car Championship	Manufacturers: (France) Citroën	2016 World Touring Car Championship
World Touring Car Championship	Trophy: (Morocco) Mehdi Bennani	2016 World Touring Car Championship
World Touring Car Championship	Trophy Teams: (France) Sébastien Loeb Racing	2016 World Touring Car Championship
Brasileiro de Marcas	(Brazil) Nonô Figueiredo	2016 Brasileiro de Marcas
Brasileiro de Marcas	Teams: (Brazil) JML Racing	2016 Brasileiro de Marcas
Brasileiro de Marcas	Manufacturers: (Japan) Honda	2016 Brasileiro de Marcas
British Touring Car Championship	(United Kingdom) Gordon Shedden	2016 British Touring Car Championship
British Touring Car Championship	Manufacturers / Constructors: BMW/West Surrey Racing	2016 British Touring Car Championship
British Touring Car Championship	Teams: Team JCT600 with GardX	2016 British Touring Car Championship
British Touring Car Championship	Independents: (United Kingdom) Andrew Jordan	2016 British Touring Car Championship
China Touring Car Championship	(China) Zhendong Zhang	2016 China Touring Car Championship
China Touring Car Championship	Manufacturers: (China) Changan Ford Racing Team	2016 China Touring Car Championship
China Touring Car Championship	Teams: (China) Teamwork Motorsport	2016 China Touring Car Championship
China Touring Car Championship	1.6T: (China) Martin Xie	2016 China Touring Car Championship
China Touring Car Championship	Production: (China) Xi Yang	2016 China Touring Car Championship
Deutsche Tourenwagen Masters	(Germany) Marco Wittmann	2016 Deutsche Tourenwagen Masters
Deutsche Tourenwagen Masters	Manufacturers: (Germany) Audi	2016 Deutsche Tourenwagen Masters
Deutsche Tourenwagen Masters	Teams: (Germany) Audi Sport Team Abt Sportsline	2016 Deutsche Tourenwagen Masters
Deutscher Tourenwagen Cup	(Switzerland) Milenko Vukovic	2016 Deutscher Tourenwagen Cup
Deutscher Tourenwagen Cup	Production 1: (Germany) Victoria Froß	2016 Deutscher Tourenwagen Cup
Deutscher Tourenwagen Cup	Production 2: (Bulgaria) Pavel Lefterov	2016 Deutscher Tourenwagen Cup
European Touring Car Cup	Super 2000: (Switzerland) Kris Richard	2016 European Touring Car Cup
European Touring Car Cup	Super 1600: (Germany) Niklas Mackschin	2016 European Touring Car Cup
Italian Touring Car Championship	TCR: (Italy) Roberto Colciago	2016 Italian Touring Car Championship
Italian Touring Car Championship	TCS: (Italy) Alberto Bassi	2016 Italian Touring Car Championship
Italian Touring Car Championship	TCT: (Italy) Andrea Bacci	2016 Italian Touring Car Championship
Kerrick Sports Sedans Series	(Australia) Tony Ricciardello	2016 Kerrick Sports Sedans Series
Australian Super Six Touring Car Series	(Australia) Grant Johnson	2016 Australian Super Six Touring Car Series
NZ Touring Cars	Class One: (New Zealand) Simon Evans	2015-16 NZ Touring Cars season
NZ Touring Cars	Class Two: (New Zealand) Brock Cooley	2015-16 NZ Touring Cars season
Renault Clio Cup United Kingdom	(United Kingdom) Ant Whorton-Eales	2016 Renault UK Clio Cup
Russian Circuit Racing Series	Touring: (Russia) Dmitry Bragin	2016 Russian Circuit Racing Series
Russian Circuit Racing Series	TCR Russia Touring Car Championship: Dmitry Bragin	2016 Russian Circuit Racing Series
Russian Circuit Racing Series	Super-Production: (Russia) Maksim Chernev	2016 Russian Circuit Racing Series
Russian Circuit Racing Series	Touring-Light: (Russia) Dmitry Bragin	2016 Russian Circuit Racing Series
Russian Circuit Racing Series	National: (Russia) Vladimir Sheshenin	2016 Russian Circuit Racing Series
Russian Circuit Racing Series	National Junior: (Russia) Anton Gavrichenkov	2016 Russian Circuit Racing Series
Scandinavian Touring Car Championship	(Sweden) Richard Göransson	2016 Scandinavian Touring Car Championship
Scandinavian Touring Car Championship	Teams: Polestar Cyan Racing	2016 Scandinavian Touring Car Championship
Súper TC2000	(Argentina) Agustín Canapino	2016 Súper TC2000
Súper TC2000	Teams: (Argentina) Renault Sport	2016 Súper TC2000
Súper TC2000	Manufacturers: (France) Renault	2016 Súper TC2000
Supercars Championship	(New Zealand) Shane van Gisbergen	2016 International V8 Supercars Championship
Supercars Championship	Teams: (Australia) Triple Eight Race Engineering	2016 International V8 Supercars Championship
Supercars Championship	Manufacturers: (Australia) Holden	2016 International V8 Supercars Championship
Supercars Championship	Endurance Cup: (New Zealand) Shane van Gisbergen; Endurance Cup: (France) Alexandre Prémat	2016 International V8 Supercars Championship
Supercars Dunlop Series	(Australia) Garry Jacobson	2016 Supercars Dunlop Series
Touring Car Masters	(Australia) John Bowe	2016 Touring Car Masters
V8 Touring Car National Series	(Australia) Taz Douglas	2016 Kumho Tyres Australian V8 Touring Car Series
TCR Series
TCR International Series	(Switzerland) Stefano Comini	2016 TCR International Series
TCR International Series	Teams: (United Kingdom) Team Craft-Bamboo Lukoil	2016 TCR International Series
TCR International Series	Models: (Spain) Seat Léon TCR	2016 TCR International Series
TCR Asia Series	(Hong Kong) Andy Yan	2016 TCR Asia Series
TCR Asia Series	Teams: (Germany) Liqui Moly Team Engstler	2016 TCR Asia Series
TCR Trophy Europe	(Belgium) Pierre-Yves Corthals	2016 TCR Trophy Europe
TCR Benelux Touring Car Championship	(Belgium) Stéphane Lémeret	2016 TCR Benelux Touring Car Championship
TCR Benelux Touring Car Championship	Junior: (Belgium) Romain de Leval	2016 TCR Benelux Touring Car Championship
TCR Benelux Touring Car Championship	Teams: (Belgium) RACB National Team/Team WRT	2016 TCR Benelux Touring Car Championship
TCR Benelux Touring Car Championship	Cars: Honda Civic TCR	2016 TCR Benelux Touring Car Championship
ADAC TCR Germany Touring Car Championship	(United Kingdom) Josh Files	2016 ADAC TCR Germany Touring Car Championship
ADAC TCR Germany Touring Car Championship	Teams: (Italy) Target Competition	2016 ADAC TCR Germany Touring Car Championship
ADAC TCR Germany Touring Car Championship	Junior: (Germany) Tom Lautenschlager	2016 ADAC TCR Germany Touring Car Championship
Trofeo de España TCR	(Spain) Jaime Font (Spain) Faust Salom	2016 Trofeo de España TCR
TCR Thailand Touring Car Championship	Pro-Am: (Thailand) Jack Lemvard	2016 TCR Thailand Touring Car Championship
TCR Thailand Touring Car Championship	Am: (Taiwan) Chen Jian Hong	2016 TCR Thailand Touring Car Championship

== Truck racing ==
Series	Champion	refer
Fórmula Truck	(Brazil) Felipe Giaffone	2016 Fórmula Truck season
Fórmula Truck	Teams: (Brazil) RM Competições	2016 Fórmula Truck season
Fórmula Truck	Manufacturers: (Germany) Mercedes-Benz	2016 Fórmula Truck season
European Truck Racing Championship	(Germany) Jochen Hahn	2016 European Truck Racing Championship
European Truck Racing Championship	Teams: (Germany) Reinert Racing GmbH	2016 European Truck Racing Championship
Stadium Super Trucks	(United States) Sheldon Creed	2016 Stadium Super Trucks
V8 Ute Racing Series	(Australia) David Sieders	2016 V8 Ute Racing Series

== See also ==
- List of motorsport championships
