= List of 2015 motorsport champions =

2015 motorsport champions
| Previous: 2014 | Next: 2016 |

This list of 2015 motorsport champions is a list of national or international auto racing series with championships decided by the points or positions earned by a driver from multiple races where the season was completed during the 2015 calendar year.

== Air racing ==
| Series | Pilot | refer |
|---|---|---|
| Red Bull Air Race World Championship | (United Kingdom) Paul Bonhomme | 2015 Red Bull Air Race World Championship |
| Red Bull Air Race World Championship | Challenger: (France) Mikaël Brageot | 2015 Red Bull Air Race World Championship |

== Dirt oval racing ==
| Series | Champion | Refer |
|---|---|---|
| Lucas Oil Late Model Dirt Series | (United States) Jonathan Davenport | |
| World of Outlaws Late Model Series | (United States) Shane Clanton | |
| World of Outlaws Sprint Car Series | (United States) Donny Schatz | 2015 World of Outlaws Sprint Car Series |
| World of Outlaws Sprint Car Series | Teams: (United States) Tony Stewart Racing | 2015 World of Outlaws Sprint Car Series |

== Drag racing ==
| Series | Champion | Refer |
|---|---|---|
| NHRA Mello Yello Drag Racing Series | Top Fuel: (United States) Antron Brown | 2015 NHRA Mello Yello Drag Racing Series |
| NHRA Mello Yello Drag Racing Series | Funny Car: (United States) Del Worsham | 2015 NHRA Mello Yello Drag Racing Series |
| NHRA Mello Yello Drag Racing Series | Pro Stock: (United States) Erica Enders | 2015 NHRA Mello Yello Drag Racing Series |
| NHRA Mello Yello Drag Racing Series | Pro Stock Motorcycle: (United States) Andrew Hines | 2015 NHRA Mello Yello Drag Racing Series |
| European Drag Racing Championship | Top Fuel: (Sweden) Micke Kågered | |
| European Drag Racing Championship | Top Methanol Dragster: (Germany) Dennis Habermann | |
| European Drag Racing Championship | Top Methanol Funny Car: (Sweden) Leif Andreasson | |
| European Drag Racing Championship | Pro Stock Car: (Sweden) Thomas Lindström | |
| European Drag Racing Championship | Pro Stock Modified: (Sweden) Michael Gullqvist | |

== Drifting ==
| Series | Champion | Refer |
|---|---|---|
| British Drift Championship | (Republic of Ireland) Jack Shanahan | 2015 British Drift Championship |
| British Drift Championship | Semi-Pro: (United Kingdom) Fraser Stark | 2015 British Drift Championship |
| D1 Grand Prix | (Japan) Masato Kawabata | 2015 D1 Grand Prix series |
| D1 Grand Prix | D1SL: (Japan) Yusuke Kitaoka | 2015 D1 Grand Prix series |
| D1NZ | (New Zealand) Darren Kelly | 2014–15 D1NZ season |
| D1NZ | Pro-Sport: (New Zealand) Troy Jenkins | 2014–15 D1NZ season |
| Drift Allstars | (Republic of Ireland) James Deane | 2015 Drift Allstars |
| Drift Masters | (Poland) Piotr Więcek | 2015 Drift Masters |
| Formula D | (Norway) Fredric Aasbø | 2015 Formula D season |
| Formula D | PROSPEC: (Peru) Alex Heilbrunn | 2015 Formula D season |
| Formula D | Manufacturers: (Japan) Scion | 2015 Formula D season |
| Formula D | Tire Cup: (South Korea) Hankook | 2015 Formula D season |

== Karting ==
| Series | Driver | Season article |
|---|---|---|
| CIK-FIA Karting World Championship | KF: (Poland) Karol Basz | |
| CIK-FIA Karting World Championship | KFJ: (United States) Logan Sargeant | |
| CIK-FIA Karting World Championship | KZ: (Netherlands) Jorrit Pex | |
| CIK-FIA Karting World Championship | KZ2: (France) Thomas Laurent | |
| CIK-FIA Karting Academy Trophy | (Spain) Marta García | 2015 CIK-FIA Karting Academy Trophy |
| CIK-FIA Karting European Championship | KF: (United Kingdom) Ben Hanley | |
| CIK-FIA Karting European Championship | KZ: (Italy) Flavio Camponeschi | |
| CIK-FIA Karting European Championship | KF-J: (Denmark) Christian Lundgaard | |
| CIK-FIA Karting European Championship | KZ2: (Sweden) Joel Johansson | |
| WSK Champions Cup | KF: (Denmark) Nicklas Nielsen | |
| WSK Champions Cup | KFJ: (United States) Logan Sargeant | |
| WSK Champions Cup | 60 Mini: (Norway) Dennis Hauger | |
| Rotax Max Challenge | DD2: (Hungary) Ferenc Kancsar | |
| Rotax Max Challenge | DD2 Masters: (New Zealand) Ryan Urban | |
| Rotax Max Challenge | Senior: (Italy) Alex Irlando | |
| Rotax Max Challenge | Junior: (France) Florian Venturi | |
| Rotax Max Challenge | Nations Cup: United States | |

== Motorcycle racing ==
| Series | Rider | refer |
|---|---|---|
| MotoGP World Championship | (Spain) Jorge Lorenzo | 2015 MotoGP season |
| MotoGP World Championship | Constructors: (Japan) Yamaha | 2015 MotoGP season |
| MotoGP World Championship | Team: (Japan) Movistar Yamaha MotoGP | 2015 MotoGP season |
| Moto2 World Championship | (France) Johann Zarco | 2015 Moto2 season |
| Moto2 World Championship | Constructors: (Germany) Kalex | 2015 Moto2 season |
| Moto3 World Championship | (United Kingdom) Danny Kent | 2015 Moto3 season |
| Moto3 World Championship | Constructors: (Japan) Honda | 2015 Moto3 season |
| Superbike World Championship | (United Kingdom) Jonathan Rea | 2015 Superbike World Championship |
| Superbike World Championship | Manufacturers: (Japan) Kawasaki | 2015 Superbike World Championship |
| Supersport World Championship | (Turkey) Kenan Sofuoğlu | 2015 Supersport World Championship |
| Supersport World Championship | Manufacturers: (Japan) Kawasaki | 2015 Supersport World Championship |
| FIM Superstock 1000 Cup | (Italy) Lorenzo Savadori | 2015 FIM Superstock 1000 Cup |
| FIM Superstock 1000 Cup | Manufacturers: (Italy) Aprilia | 2015 FIM Superstock 1000 Cup |
| European Superstock 600 Championship | (Turkey) Toprak Razgatlıoğlu | 2015 European Superstock 600 Championship |
| European Junior Cup | (Spain) Javier Orellana | 2015 European Junior Cup |
| European Junior Cup | Women Cup: (New Zealand) Avalon Biddle | 2015 European Junior Cup |
| Red Bull MotoGP Rookies Cup | (Netherlands) Bo Bendsneyder | 2015 Red Bull MotoGP Rookies Cup |
| FIM CEV Moto2 European Championship | (Spain) Edgar Pons | 2015 FIM CEV Moto2 European Championship |
| FIM CEV Moto3 Junior World Championship | (Italy) Nicolò Bulega | 2015 FIM CEV Moto3 Junior World Championship |
| FIM CEV Superbike European Championship | (Spain) Carmelo Morales | |
| Kawasaki Z Cup | (Spain) Joan Sardanyons | |
| Australian Superbike Championship | (Australia) Mike Jones | |
| British Superbike Championship | (Australia) Josh Brookes | 2015 British Superbike Championship |
| British Supersport Championship | (United Kingdom) Luke Stapleford | 2015 British Supersport Championship season |
| MotoAmerica Superbike | (United States) Cameron Beaubier | 2015 MotoAmerica season |
| MotoAmerica Superstock 1000 | (United States) Jacob Gagne | 2015 MotoAmerica season |
| MotoAmerica Supersport | (United States) J. D. Beach | 2015 MotoAmerica season |
| MotoAmerica Superstock 600 | (United States) Joe Roberts | 2015 MotoAmerica season |
| MotoAmerica KTM RC 390 Cup | (United States) Gage McAllister | 2015 MotoAmerica season |

== Open wheel racing ==
| Series | Champion | refer |
|---|---|---|
| FIA Formula One World Championship | (United Kingdom) Lewis Hamilton | 2015 Formula One World Championship |
| FIA Formula One World Championship | Constructors: (Germany) Mercedes | 2015 Formula One World Championship |
| GP2 Series | (Belgium) Stoffel Vandoorne | 2015 GP2 Series |
| GP2 Series | Teams: (France) ART Grand Prix | 2015 GP2 Series |
| GP3 Series | (France) Esteban Ocon | 2015 GP3 Series |
| GP3 Series | Teams: (France) ART Grand Prix | 2015 GP3 Series |
| IndyCar Series | (New Zealand) Scott Dixon | 2015 IndyCar Series |
| IndyCar Series | Manufacturers: (United States) Chevrolet | 2015 IndyCar Series |
| IndyCar Series | Rookie: (Colombia) Gabby Chaves | 2015 IndyCar Series |
| Formula E | (Brazil) Nelson Piquet Jr. | 2014–15 Formula E season |
| Formula E | Teams: (France) e.dams Renault | 2014–15 Formula E season |
| Super Formula | (Japan) Hiroaki Ishiura | 2015 Super Formula Championship |
| Super Formula | Teams: (Japan) Petronas Team TOM'S | 2015 Super Formula Championship |
| Indy Lights | (United States) Spencer Pigot | 2015 Indy Lights season |
| Toyota Racing Series | (Canada) Lance Stroll | 2015 Toyota Racing Series |
| FIA Masters Historic Formula One Championship | Fittipaldi/Stewart: (United Kingdom) Nick Padmore | 2015 FIA Masters Historic Formula One Championship |
| FIA Masters Historic Formula One Championship | Head/Lauda: (United Kingdom) Andy Wolfe | 2015 FIA Masters Historic Formula One Championship |
| Pro Mazda Championship | (Uruguay) Santiago Urrutia | 2015 Pro Mazda Championship |
| Pro Mazda Championship Winterfest | (United Kingdom) Jack Aitken | 2015 Pro Mazda Winterfest |
| F2000 Italian Formula Trophy | (Italy) Marco Zanasi | 2015 F2000 Italian Formula Trophy |
| F2000 Italian Formula Trophy | Teams: (Italy) Tomcat Racing | 2015 F2000 Italian Formula Trophy |
| Formula Masters China | (Estonia) Martin Rump | 2015 Formula Masters China |
| Formula Masters China | Teams: (Hong Kong) Cebu Pacific Air by KCMG | 2015 Formula Masters China |
| MRF Challenge Formula 2000 Championship | (United Kingdom) Toby Sowery | 2014–15 MRF Challenge Formula 2000 Championship |
| BOSS GP | Open Class: (Netherlands) Klaas Zwart | |
| BOSS GP | Formula Class: (Austria) Johann Ledermair | |
| BOSS GP | Masters Class: (Germany) Hans Laub | |
| Atlantic Championship | (United States) Keith Grant | 2015 Atlantic Championship season |
| Formula Masters Russia | (Russia) Ivan Chubarov | 2015 Formula Masters Russia |
| Formula Lites | (Brazil) Vinicius Papareli | 2015 Formula Lites season |
Formula Three
| FIA Formula 3 Intercontinental Cup | (Sweden) Felix Rosenqvist | 2015 Macau Grand Prix |
| FIA Formula 3 European Championship | (Sweden) Felix Rosenqvist | 2015 FIA Formula 3 European Championship |
| FIA Formula 3 European Championship | Teams: (Italy) Prema Powerteam | 2015 FIA Formula 3 European Championship |
| FIA Formula 3 European Championship | Rookie: (Monaco) Charles Leclerc | 2015 FIA Formula 3 European Championship |
| All-Japan Formula Three Championship | (New Zealand) Nick Cassidy | 2015 All-Japan Formula Three Championship |
| All-Japan Formula Three Championship | National: (Japan) Ryo Ogawa | 2015 All-Japan Formula Three Championship |
| All-Japan Formula Three Championship | Teams: (Japan) TOM'S | 2015 All-Japan Formula Three Championship |
| All-Japan Formula Three Championship | Engine Tuners: (Japan) TOM'S (Toyota) | 2015 All-Japan Formula Three Championship |
| Australian Drivers' Championship | (Australia) Ricky Capo | 2015 Australian Formula 3 Championship |
| Australian Drivers' Championship | National: (Australia) Luke Spalding | 2015 Australian Formula 3 Championship |
| Australian Drivers' Championship | Kumho Cup: (Australia) Shane Wilson | 2015 Australian Formula 3 Championship |
| Fórmula 3 Brasil | (Brazil) Pedro Piquet | 2015 Fórmula 3 Brasil season |
| Fórmula 3 Brasil | Teams: (Brazil) Césario F3 | 2015 Fórmula 3 Brasil season |
| Fórmula 3 Brasil | Class B: (Brazil) Guilherme Samaia | 2015 Fórmula 3 Brasil season |
| Fórmula 3 Brasil | Class B Teams: (Brazil) Prop Car Racing | 2015 Fórmula 3 Brasil season |
| Euroformula Open Championship | (Brazil) Vitor Baptista | 2015 Euroformula Open Championship |
| Euroformula Open Championship | Teams: (Italy) RP Motorsport | 2015 Euroformula Open Championship |
| Spanish Formula Three | (Russia) Konstantin Tereshchenko | 2015 Euroformula Open Championship |
| Spanish Formula Three | Teams: (Spain) Campos Racing | 2015 Euroformula Open Championship |
| MotorSport Vision Formula Three Cup | (United Kingdom) Aaron Steele | 2015 MotorSport Vision Formula Three Cup |
| MotorSport Vision Formula Three Cup | Teams: (United Kingdom) Chris Dittmann Racing | 2015 MotorSport Vision Formula Three Cup |
| MotorSport Vision Formula Three Cup | Cup: (United Kingdom) Aaron Steele | 2015 MotorSport Vision Formula Three Cup |
| MotorSport Vision Formula Three Cup | Trophy: (United Kingdom) Adrian Holey | 2015 MotorSport Vision Formula Three Cup |
Formula 4
| ADAC Formula 4 | (Germany) Marvin Dienst | 2015 ADAC Formula 4 Championship |
| ADAC Formula 4 | Rookie: (Germany) David Beckmann | 2015 ADAC Formula 4 Championship |
| Italian Formula 4 Championship | (Estonia) Ralf Aron | 2015 Italian F4 Championship |
| Italian Formula 4 Championship | Teams: (Italy) Prema Powerteam | 2015 Italian F4 Championship |
| MSA Formula | (United Kingdom) Lando Norris | 2015 MSA Formula Championship |
| MSA Formula | Rookie: (United Kingdom) Enaam Ahmed | 2015 MSA Formula Championship |
| SMP F4 Championship | (Finland) Niko Kari | 2015 SMP F4 Championship |
| BRDC Formula 4 Championship | (United Kingdom) Will Palmer | 2015 BRDC Formula 4 Championship |
| F4 Japanese Championship | (Japan) Sho Tsuboi | 2015 F4 Japanese Championship |
| Australian Formula 4 Championship | (Australia) Jordan Lloyd | 2015 Australian Formula 4 Championship |
| Formula 4 Sudamericana | (Brazil) Pedro Cardoso | 2015 Formula 4 Sudamericana season |
| Formula 4 Sudamericana | Copa Argentina: (Peru) Rodrigo Pflucker | 2015 Formula 4 Sudamericana season |
| Formula 4 Sudamericana | Copa Brasil: (Brazil) Pedro Cardoso | 2015 Formula 4 Sudamericana season |
| JAF Japan Formula 4 | East: (Japan) Tadasuke Makino | 2015 JAF Japan Formula 4 |
| JAF Japan Formula 4 | West: (Japan) Tadasuke Makino | 2015 JAF Japan Formula 4 |
Formula Renault
| Formula Renault 3.5 Series | (United Kingdom) Oliver Rowland | 2015 Formula Renault 3.5 Series |
| Formula Renault 3.5 Series | Teams: (United Kingdom) Fortec Motorsports | 2015 Formula Renault 3.5 Series |
| Eurocup Formula Renault 2.0 | (United Kingdom) Jack Aitken | 2015 Eurocup Formula Renault 2.0 |
| Eurocup Formula Renault 2.0 | Teams: (Germany) Josef Kaufmann Racing | 2015 Eurocup Formula Renault 2.0 |
| Formula Renault 2.0 Alps | (United Kingdom) Jack Aitken | 2015 Formula Renault 2.0 Alps Series |
| Formula Renault 2.0 Alps | Teams: (Finland) Koiranen GP | 2015 Formula Renault 2.0 Alps Series |
| Formula Renault 2.0 Alps | Junior: (Russia) Matevos Isaakyan | 2015 Formula Renault 2.0 Alps Series |
| Formula Renault 2.0 Northern European Cup | (Switzerland) Louis Delétraz | 2015 Formula Renault 2.0 Northern European Cup |
| Formula Renault 2.0 Northern European Cup | Teams: (Germany) Josef Kaufmann Racing | 2015 Formula Renault 2.0 Northern European Cup |
| French F4 Championship | (France) Valentin Moineault | 2015 French F4 Championship |
| French F4 Championship | Junior: (France) Sacha Fenestraz | 2015 French F4 Championship |
| French F4 Championship | International: (France) Valentin Moineault | 2015 French F4 Championship |
| Asian Formula Renault Series | (United Kingdom) Dan Wells | 2015 Asian Formula Renault Series |
| Asian Formula Renault Series | Teams: (Hong Kong) KCMG | 2015 Asian Formula Renault Series |
| Formula Renault 2.0 Argentina | (Argentina) Martín Moggia | 2015 Formula Renault 2.0 Argentina |
| V de V Challenge Monoplace | (Switzerland) David Droux | 2015 V de V Challenge Monoplace |
Formula Ford
| Australian Formula Ford Series | (Australia) Cameron Hill | 2015 Australian Formula Ford Series |
| U.S. F2000 National Championship | (France) Nico Jamin | 2015 U.S. F2000 National Championship |
| U.S. F2000 Winterfest | (France) Nico Jamin | 2015 U.S. F2000 Winterfest |
| F2000 Championship Series | (United States) Sam Beasley | 2015 F2000 Championship Series |
| F1600 Championship Series | (Australia) Scott Andrews | 2015 F1600 Championship Series |
| New Zealand Formula Ford Championship | (New Zealand) Taylor Cockerton | 2014–15 New Zealand Formula Ford Championship |
| Pacific F2000 Championship | (United States) Tim Hope | 2015 Pacific F2000 Championship |
| Toyo Tires F1600 Championship Series | (Canada) Reid Arnold | 2015 Toyo Tires F1600 Championship Series |

== Powerboat racing ==
| Series | Driver | refer |
|---|---|---|
| Formula 1 Powerboat World Championship | (France) Philippe Chiappe | 2015 F1 Powerboat World Championship |
| Formula 1 Powerboat World Championship | Teams: Qatar Team | 2015 F1 Powerboat World Championship |

== Radio-controlled racing ==
=== 1:8 On-Road ===
| Series | Champion | refer |
|---|---|---|
| IFMAR 1:8 IC Track World Championship | (Switzerland) Simon Kurzbuch | |
| EFRA European 1:8 IC Track Championship | (Germany) Oliver Mack | |
| ROAR 1:8 Fuel On-Road National Championship | (United States) Mike Swauger | |
| FEMCA Asia On Road GP Championship | (Japan) Shoki Takahata | |
| JMRCA All-Japan 1:8 GP On-Road Championship | (Japan) Shinnosuke Yokoyama | |

=== 1:10 Off-Road ===
| Series | Champion | refer |
|---|---|---|
| IFMAR 1:10 Electric Off-Road World Championship | 2WD: (United States) Spencer Rivkin | 2015 IFMAR 1:10 Electric Off-Road World Championship |
| IFMAR 1:10 Electric Off-Road World Championship | 4WD: (Portugal) Bruno Coelho | 2015 IFMAR 1:10 Electric Off-Road World Championship |
| ROAR 1:10 Off-Road National Championship | 2WD: (United States) Ryan Cavalieri | |
| ROAR 1:10 Off-Road National Championship | 4WD: (United States) Ryan Cavalieri | |
| JMRCA All-Japan 1:10 EP Off-Road Championship | 2WD: (Japan) Masatsugu Ido | |
| JMRCA All-Japan 1:10 EP Off-Road Championship | 4WD: (Japan) Naoto Matsukura | |
| EFRA European 1:10 Off-Road Championship | 2WD: (United Kingdom) Lee Martin | |
| EFRA European 1:10 Off-Road Championship | 4WD: (Poland) Michal Orlowski | |
| BRCA 1:10 Off-Road Championship | 2WD: (United Kingdom) Lee Martin | |
| BRCA 1:10 Off-Road Championship | 4WD: (United Kingdom) Lee Martin | |
| Deutsche Meisterschaften Elektro Off-Road 1:10 | 2WD: (Germany) Swen Lauber | |
| Deutsche Meisterschaften Elektro Off-Road 1:10 | 4WD: (Germany) Jörn Neumann | |
| Sverige Cupen 1:10 Off-Road | 2WD: (Sweden) Niclas Månsson | |
| Sverige Cupen 1:10 Off-Road | 4WD: (Sweden) Malin Karlsen | |
| Euro Offroad Series | 2WD: (United Kingdom) Lee Martin | |
| Euro Offroad Series | 4WD: (United Kingdom) Lee Martin | |
| CML RACE France | 2WD Stock: (France) Fabrice Goujon | |
| CML RACE France | 2WD: (France) Lorenzo Crolla | |
| CML RACE France | 4WD: (France) Ludovic Valtier | |

=== 1:10 Electric Touring Car ===
| Series | Champion | refer |
|---|---|---|
| EFRA European 1:10 Electric Touring Car Championship | Modified: (Sweden) Alexander Hagberg | |
| JMRCA All-Japan 1:10 EP Touring Car Championship | Super Expert: (Japan) Akio Sobue | |
| BRCA Touring Car National Championship | Modified: (United Kingdom) Elliott Harper | |
| ROAR 1:10 Electric Asphalt National Championship | Modified: (United States) Ryan Cavalieri | |
| ROAR 1:10 Electric Carpet National Championship | Modified: (Canada) Keven Hebert | |
| Euro Touring Series | Modified: (Germany) Ronald Völker | |

=== 1:8 Off-Road ===
| Series | Champion | refer |
|---|---|---|
| EFRA European 1:8 IC Off-Road Championship | (United Kingdom) Elliott Boots | |
| ROAR 1:8 Fuel Off-Road National Championship | Buggy: (Canada) Ty Tessmann | |
| ROAR 1:8 Fuel Off-Road National Championship | Truggy: (Canada) Ty Tessmann | |
| Coupe de France tout-terrain 1:8 | (France) Jerôme Aigoin | |
| BRCA Rallycross National Championship | (United Kingdom) Elliott Boots | |
| Deutsche Meisterschaften Verbrenner Off-Road 1:8 | (Germany) Marvin Fritschler | |
| Campeonato de España de 1:8 TT Gas | (Spain) Robert Batlle | |
| JMRCA All-Japan 1:8 GP Off-Road Championship | (Japan) Kazuya Tanaka | |
| Sverige Cupen 1:8 Off-Road | (Sweden) David Ronnefalk | |
| FEMCA 1:8 Off-Road Championship | (Australia) Kyle McBride | |
| ROAR 1:8 Electric Off-Road National Championship | (United States) Ryan Maifield | |
| EFRA European 1:8 Electric Off-Road Championship | (Spain) Robert Batlle | |
| Deutsche Meisterschaften Elektro Off-Road 1:8 | (Germany) Marvin Fritschler | |

=== 1:12 On-Road ===
| Series | Champion | refer |
|---|---|---|
| EFRA 1:12 On-Road Championship | Modified: (Sweden) Alexander Hagberg | |
| JMRCA All-Japan 1:12 EP Racing Championship | Modified: (Japan) Yugo Nagashima | |
| BRCA 1:12 Electric Circuit National Championship | Modified: (United Kingdom) Olly Jefferies | |
| ROAR Electric Carpet National Championship | Modified: (Canada) Keven Hebert | |

=== 1:10 200mm Nitro Touring Car ===
| Series | Champion | refer |
|---|---|---|
| EFRA European 1:10 IC On-Road Championship | (Portugal) Bruno Coelho | |
| ROAR 1:10 Fuel Sedan National Championship | (United States) Paul Lemieux | |
| FEMCA Asia On Road GP Championship | (Thailand) Surikarn Chaidajsuriya | |

=== 1:5 Large Scale On-Road ===
| Series | Champion | refer |
|---|---|---|
| IFMAR Large Scale World Championship | (Australia) Russell Grenenger | |
| EFRA Large Scale Touring Car European Championship | (Czech Republic) Aleš Bayer | |

=== 1:6 Large Scale Off-Road ===
| Series | Champion | refer |
|---|---|---|
| EFRA European Large Scale Off-Road Championships | 2WD: (Austria) Patrick Schweinzer | |
| EFRA European Large Scale Off-Road Championships | 4WD: (Estonia) Jörg Miikael Tiit | |

== Rallying ==
| Series | Champion(s) | refer |
|---|---|---|
| World Rally Championship | (France) Sébastien Ogier; Co-Driver: (France) Julien Ingrassia | 2015 World Rally Championship |
| World Rally Championship | Manufacturers: (Germany) Volkswagen | 2015 World Rally Championship |
| World Rally Championship-2 | (Qatar) Nasser Al-Attiyah; Co-Driver: (France) Matthieu Baumel | 2015 World Rally Championship-2 |
| World Rally Championship-2 | Teams: (Czech Republic) Škoda Motorsport | 2015 World Rally Championship-2 |
| World Rally Championship-2 | Production Car Drivers: (Italy) Gianluca Linari; Co-Driver: (Italy) Nicola Arena | 2015 World Rally Championship-2 |
| World Rally Championship-3 | (France) Quentin Gilbert; Co-Driver: (Belgium) Renaud Jamoul | 2015 World Rally Championship-3 |
| World Rally Championship-3 | Teams: (Finland) Printsport | 2015 World Rally Championship-3 |
| Junior World Rally Championship | (France) Quentin Gilbert; Co-Driver: (Belgium) Renaud Jamoul | 2015 Junior World Rally Championship |
| Junior World Rally Championship | Nations: France | 2015 Junior World Rally Championship |
| FIA R-GT Cup | (France) François Delecour; Co-Driver: (France) Dominique Savignoni | 2015 FIA R-GT Cup |
| ADAC Opel Rallye Cup | (Germany) Julius Tannert | 2015 ADAC Opel Rallye Cup |
| ADAC Opel Rallye Cup | Co-Drivers: (Luxembourg) Jennifer Thielen | 2015 ADAC Opel Rallye Cup |
| African Rally Championship | (Kenya) Jaspreet Singh Chatthe | 2015 African Rally Championship |
| African Rally Championship | Co-Drivers: (United Kingdom) Craig Thorley | 2015 African Rally Championship |
| Asia-Pacific Rally Championship | (Sweden) Pontus Tidemand | 2015 Asia-Pacific Rally Championship |
| Asia-Pacific Rally Championship | Co-Drivers: (Sweden) Emil Axelsson | 2015 Asia-Pacific Rally Championship |
| Australian Rally Championship | (Australia) Eli Evans | 2015 Australian Rally Championship |
| Australian Rally Championship | Co-Drivers: (Australia) Glen Weston | 2015 Australian Rally Championship |
| Canadian Rally Championship | (Canada) Antoine L'Estage | 2015 Canadian Rally Championship |
| Canadian Rally Championship | Co-Drivers: (Canada) Alan Ockwell | 2015 Canadian Rally Championship |
| Central European Zone Rally Championship | Class 2: (Hungary) János Puskádi | 2015 Central European Zone Rally Championship |
| Central European Zone Rally Championship | Production: (Croatia) Juraj Šebalj | 2015 Central European Zone Rally Championship |
| Central European Zone Rally Championship | 2WD: (Slovenia) Aleks Humar; 2WD: (Hungary) Zoltán Bessenyey | 2015 Central European Zone Rally Championship |
| Central European Zone Rally Championship | Historic: (Hungary) Ferenc Wirtmann | 2015 Central European Zone Rally Championship |
| Codasur South American Rally Championship | (Paraguay) Diego Domínguez | 2015 Codasur South American Rally Championship |
| Czech Rally Championship | (Czech Republic) Jan Kopecký | 2015 Czech Rally Championship |
| Czech Rally Championship | Co-Drivers: (Czech Republic) Pavel Dresler | 2015 Czech Rally Championship |
| Deutsche Rallye Meisterschaft | (Germany) Ruben Zeltner | |
| Estonian Rally Championship | (Estonia) Siim Plangi | 2015 Estonian Rally Championship |
| Estonian Rally Championship | Co-Drivers: (Estonia) Marek Sarapuu | 2015 Estonian Rally Championship |
| European Rally Championship | (Poland) Kajetan Kajetanowicz | 2015 European Rally Championship |
| European Rally Championship | Co-Drivers: (Poland) Jarosław Baran | 2015 European Rally Championship |
| French Rally Championship | (France) Jean-Marie Cuoq | |
| Hungarian Rally Championship | (Hungary) Norbert Herczig | |
| Hungarian Rally Championship | Co-Drivers: (Hungary) Igor Bacigál | |
| Indian National Rally Championship | (India) Lohith V. Urs | |
| Indian National Rally Championship | Co-Drivers: (India) Srikanth GM | |
| Italian Rally Championship | (Italy) Paolo Andreucci | |
| Italian Rally Championship | Co-Drivers: (Italy) Anna Andreussi | |
| Italian Rally Championship | Manufacturers: (France) Peugeot | |
| Middle East Rally Championship | (Qatar) Nasser Al-Attiyah | |
| NACAM Rally Championship | (Mexico) Ricardo Triviño | 2015 NACAM Rally Championship |
| NACAM Rally Championship | Co-Drivers: (Mexico) Marco Hernández | 2015 NACAM Rally Championship |
| New Zealand Rally Championship | (New Zealand) Ben Hunt | 2015 New Zealand Rally Championship |
| New Zealand Rally Championship | Co-Drivers: (New Zealand) Tony Rawstorn | 2015 New Zealand Rally Championship |
| Polish Rally Championship | (Poland) Łukasz Habaj | |
| Rally America | (United Kingdom) David Higgins | 2015 Rally America season |
| Rally America | Co-Drivers: (United Kingdom) Craig Drew | 2015 Rally America season |
| Romanian Rally Championship | (Romania) Simone Tempestini | |
| Scottish Rally Championship | (United Kingdom) Jock Armstrong | 2015 Scottish Rally Championship |
| Scottish Rally Championship | Co-Drivers: (United Kingdom) Paula Swinscoe | 2015 Scottish Rally Championship |
| Slovak Rally Championship | (Slovakia) Jaroslav Melichárek | |
| Slovak Rally Championship | Co-Drivers: (Slovakia) Erik Melichárek | |
| South African National Rally Championship | (South Africa) Mark Cronje | |
| South African National Rally Championship | Co-Drivers: (South Africa) Elvene Coetzee | |
| South African National Rally Championship | Manufacturers: (Japan) Toyota | |
| Spanish Rally Championship | (Spain) Miguel Ángel Fuster | |
| Spanish Rally Championship | Co-Drivers: (Spain) Ignacio Aviñó | |

=== Rallycross ===
| Series | Champion(s) | refer |
|---|---|---|
| FIA World Rallycross Championship | Supercar WRX: (Norway) Petter Solberg | 2015 FIA World Rallycross Championship |
| FIA World Rallycross Championship | Supercar WRX Teams: (Sweden) Team Peugeot-Hansen | 2015 FIA World Rallycross Championship |
| FIA European Rallycross Championship | Super1600: (Latvia) Jānis Baumanis | 2015 FIA European Rallycross Championship |
| FIA European Rallycross Championship | Touringcar: (Sweden) Fredrik Salsten | 2015 FIA European Rallycross Championship |
| FIA European Rallycross Championship | RX Lites: (Sweden) Kevin Hansen | 2015 FIA European Rallycross Championship |
| FIA European Rallycross Championship | Supercar ERX: (Norway) Tommy Rustad | 2015 FIA European Rallycross Championship |
| Global Rallycross | SuperCars: (United States) Scott Speed | 2015 Global RallyCross Championship |
| Global Rallycross | Manufacturers: (United States) Ford | 2015 Global RallyCross Championship |
| Global Rallycross | GRC Lites: (Sweden) Oliver Eriksson | 2015 Global RallyCross Championship |
| British Rallycross Championship | (United Kingdom) Julian Godfrey | |

== Sports car and GT ==
| Series | Champion(s) | refer |
|---|---|---|
| FIA World Endurance Championship | (Germany) Timo Bernhard (Australia) Mark Webber (New Zealand) Brendon Hartley | 2015 FIA World Endurance Championship |
| FIA World Endurance Championship | LMP1-Private: (France) Nicolas Prost; LMP1-Private: (Switzerland) Mathias Beche | 2015 FIA World Endurance Championship |
| FIA World Endurance Championship | GT: (Austria) Richard Lietz | 2015 FIA World Endurance Championship |
| FIA World Endurance Championship | LMP2: (Russia) Roman Rusinov; LMP2: (France) Julien Canal; LMP2: (United Kingdom) Sam Bird | 2015 FIA World Endurance Championship |
| FIA World Endurance Championship | LMGTE Am Drivers: (Russia) Viktor Shaitar; LMGTE Am Drivers: (Russia) Aleksey Basov; LMGTE Am Drivers: (Italy) Andrea Bertolini | 2015 FIA World Endurance Championship |
| FIA World Endurance Championship | Manufacturers: (Germany) Porsche | 2015 FIA World Endurance Championship |
| FIA World Endurance Championship | GT Manufacturers: (Germany) Porsche | 2015 FIA World Endurance Championship |
| FIA World Endurance Championship | Private LMP1 Teams: (Switzerland) Rebellion Racing | 2015 FIA World Endurance Championship |
| FIA World Endurance Championship | LMP2 Teams: (Russia) G-Drive Racing | 2015 FIA World Endurance Championship |
| FIA World Endurance Championship | LMGTE Pro Teams: (Germany) Porsche Team Manthey | 2015 FIA World Endurance Championship |
| FIA World Endurance Championship | LMGTE AM Teams: (Russia) SMP Racing | 2015 FIA World Endurance Championship |
| United SportsCar Championship | Prototype: (Portugal) João Barbosa; Prototype: (Brazil) Christian Fittipaldi | 2015 United SportsCar Championship |
| United SportsCar Championship | PC: (United States) Jon Bennett; PC: (United States) Colin Braun | 2015 United SportsCar Championship |
| United SportsCar Championship | GTLM: (France) Patrick Pilet | 2015 United SportsCar Championship |
| United SportsCar Championship | GTD: (United States) Townsend Bell; GTD: (United States) Bill Sweedler | 2015 United SportsCar Championship |
| United SportsCar Championship | Prototype Teams: (United States) Action Express Racing | 2015 United SportsCar Championship |
| United SportsCar Championship | PC Teams: (United States) CORE Autosport | 2015 United SportsCar Championship |
| United SportsCar Championship | GTLM Teams: (United States) Porsche North America | 2015 United SportsCar Championship |
| United SportsCar Championship | GTD Teams: (United States) Scuderia Corsa | 2015 United SportsCar Championship |
| United SportsCar Championship | Prototype Manufacturers: (United States) Chevrolet | 2015 United SportsCar Championship |
| United SportsCar Championship | GTLM Manufacturers: (Germany) Porsche | 2015 United SportsCar Championship |
| United SportsCar Championship | GTD Manufacturers: (Italy) Ferrari | 2015 United SportsCar Championship |
| British GT Championship | GT3: (United Kingdom) Andrew Howard; GT3: (United Kingdom) Jonathan Adam | 2015 British GT Championship |
| British GT Championship | GT4: (United Kingdom) Jamie Chadwick; GT4: (United Kingdom) Ross Gunn | 2015 British GT Championship |
| European Le Mans Series | LMP2: (Sweden) Björn Wirdheim; LMP2: (Switzerland) Gary Hirsch; LMP2: (United Kingdom) Jon Lancaster | 2015 European Le Mans Series |
| European Le Mans Series | LMP3: (United Kingdom) Charlie Robertson; LMP3: (United Kingdom) Chris Hoy | 2015 European Le Mans Series |
| European Le Mans Series | GTE: (Italy) Andrea Rizzoli; GT3: (Denmark) Johnny Laursen; GT3: (Denmark) Mikkel Mac | 2015 European Le Mans Series |
| European Le Mans Series | GTC: (France) Dino Lunardi; GTC: (France) Eric Dermont; GTC: (France) Franck Perera | 2015 European Le Mans Series |
| European Le Mans Series | LMP2 Teams: (United Kingdom) Greaves Motorsport | 2015 European Le Mans Series |
| European Le Mans Series | LMP3 Teams: (United Kingdom) Team LNT | 2015 European Le Mans Series |
| European Le Mans Series | GTE Teams: (Denmark) Formula Racing | 2015 European Le Mans Series |
| European Le Mans Series | GTC Teams: (France) TDS Racing | 2015 European Le Mans Series |
| Blancpain GT Series | (Netherlands) Robin Frijns | 2015 Blancpain GT Series |
| Blancpain GT Series | Teams: (Belgium) Belgian Audi Club Team WRT | 2015 Blancpain GT Series |
| Blancpain Endurance Series | Pro: (United Kingdom) Alex Buncombe; Pro: (Japan) Katsumasa Chiyo; Pro: (Belgium) Wolfgang Reip | 2015 Blancpain Endurance Series |
| Blancpain Endurance Series | Pro-Am: (United Kingdom) Duncan Cameron; Pro-Am: (Republic of Ireland) Matt Griffin | 2015 Blancpain Endurance Series |
| Blancpain Endurance Series | Am: (United Kingdom) Ian Loggie; Am: (United Kingdom) Julian Westwood | 2015 Blancpain Endurance Series |
| Blancpain Endurance Series | Pro Teams: (Belgium) Belgian Audi Club Team WRT | 2015 Blancpain Endurance Series |
| Blancpain Endurance Series | Pro-Am Teams: (Italy) AF Corse | 2015 Blancpain Endurance Series |
| Blancpain Endurance Series | Am Teams: (France) AKKA ASP | 2015 Blancpain Endurance Series |
| Blancpain Sprint Series | Pro: (Germany) Maximilian Buhk; Pro: (France) Vincent Abril | 2015 Blancpain Sprint Series |
| Blancpain Sprint Series | Pro-Am: (Russia) Aleksey Karachev | 2015 Blancpain Sprint Series |
| Blancpain Sprint Series | Silver Cup: (Netherlands) Jules Szymkowiak | 2015 Blancpain Sprint Series |
| Blancpain Sprint Series | Pro Teams: (Belgium) Belgian Audi Club Team WRT | 2015 Blancpain Sprint Series |
| Blancpain Sprint Series | Pro-Am Teams: (Russia) GT Russian Team | 2015 Blancpain Sprint Series |
| Blancpain Sprint Series | Silver Cup Teams: (Germany) Bentley Team HTP | 2015 Blancpain Sprint Series |
| ADAC GT Masters | (Germany) Sebastian Asch (Germany) Luca Ludwig | 2015 ADAC GT Masters |
| ADAC GT Masters | Teams: (Germany) BMW Sports Trophy Team Schubert | 2015 ADAC GT Masters |
| ADAC GT Masters | Amateur: (Germany) Andreas Weishaupt | 2015 ADAC GT Masters |
| GT4 European Series | Pro: (Netherlands) Marcel Nooren; Pro: (Netherlands) Jelle Beelen | 2015 GT4 European Series |
| GT4 European Series | Teams: (Netherlands) V8 Racing | 2015 GT4 European Series |
| GT4 European Series | Am: (Austria) Daniel Uckermann | 2015 GT4 European Series |
| International GT Open | Overall: (Portugal) Álvaro Parente; Overall: (Portugal) Miguel Ramos | 2015 International GT Open |
| International GT Open | GT3 Pro-Am: (Portugal) Álvaro Parente; GT3 Pro-Am: (Portugal) Miguel Ramos | 2015 International GT Open |
| International GT Open | GT3 Am: (Germany) Claudio Sdanewitsch | 2015 International GT Open |
| International GT Open | Cup Pro-Am: (United Kingdom) James Abbott; Cup Pro-Am: (Switzerland) Shahin Nouri | 2015 International GT Open |
| International GT Open | Cup Am: (United Kingdom) James Abbott | 2015 International GT Open |
| International GT Open | Teams: (Italy) AF Corse | 2015 International GT Open |
| Australian GT Championship | (Germany) Christopher Mies | 2015 Australian GT Championship season |
| Australian GT Championship | Trophy: (Australia) Greg Taylor; Trophy: (Australia) Barton Mawer | 2015 Australian GT Championship season |
| Super GT | GT500: (Japan) Tsugio Matsuda; GT500: (Italy) Ronnie Quintarelli | 2015 Super GT Series |
| Super GT | GT300: (Macau) André Couto | 2015 Super GT Series |
| Super GT | GT500 Teams: (Japan) Nismo | 2015 Super GT Series |
| Super GT | GT300 Teams: (Japan) Gainer | 2015 Super GT Series |
| Audi Sport TT Cup | (Poland) Jan Kisiel | 2015 Audi Sport TT Cup |
| Trans-Am Series | TA1: (United States) Amy Ruman | 2015 Trans-Am season |
| Trans-Am Series | TA2: (United States) Gar Robinson | 2015 Trans-Am season |
| Trans-Am Series | TA3-A: (United States) Ernie Francis Jr. | 2015 Trans-Am season |
| Trans-Am Series | TA3-I: (United States) Lee Saunders | 2015 Trans-Am season |
Porsche Carrera Cup
| Porsche Supercup | (Austria) Philipp Eng | 2015 Porsche Supercup |
| Porsche Supercup | Rookie: (Italy) Matteo Cairoli | 2015 Porsche Supercup |
| Porsche Supercup | Teams: (Austria) Lechner Racing Middle East | 2015 Porsche Supercup |
| Porsche Carrera Cup Germany | (Austria) Philipp Eng | 2015 Porsche Carrera Cup Germany |
| Porsche Carrera Cup Germany | Teams: (Germany) Deutsche Post by Project 1 | 2015 Porsche Carrera Cup Germany |
| Porsche Carrera Cup Germany | B–Class: (Switzerland) Rolf Ineichen | 2015 Porsche Carrera Cup Germany |
| Porsche Carrera Cup Germany | Rookie: (Spain) Alexander Toril | 2015 Porsche Carrera Cup Germany |
| Porsche Carrera Cup Great Britain | (United Kingdom) Daniel Cammish | 2015 Porsche Carrera Cup Great Britain |
| Porsche Carrera Cup Great Britain | Pro–Am: (Lithuania) Ignas Gelžinis | 2015 Porsche Carrera Cup Great Britain |
| Porsche Carrera Cup Great Britain | Pro–Am2: (United Kingdom) John McCullagh | 2015 Porsche Carrera Cup Great Britain |
| Porsche Carrera Cup France | (France) Maxime Jousse | |
| Porsche Carrera Cup France | Teams: (France) Sébastien Loeb Racing | |
| Porsche Carrera Cup France | B–Class: (France) Christophe Lapierre | |
| Porsche Carrera Cup Asia | (New Zealand) Chris van der Drift | |
| Porsche Carrera Cup Asia | Class B: (Singapore) Yuey Tan | |
| Porsche Carrera Cup Japan | (Japan) Yuya Motojima | |
| Porsche Carrera Cup Japan | Teams: (Japan) Team Ktouch Porsche | |
| Porsche Carrera Cup Japan | Gentleman: (Japan) Shinji Takei | |
| Porsche Carrera Cup Scandinavia | (Sweden) Johan Kristoffersson | |
| Porsche Carrera Cup Scandinavia | Teams: (Sweden) Kristoffersson Motorsport | |
| Porsche Carrera Cup Australia | (Australia) Nick Foster | 2015 Australian Carrera Cup Championship |
| Porsche Carrera Cup Australia | Elite Class: (Australia) Shane Smollen | 2015 Australian Carrera Cup Championship |
| Porsche Carrera Cup Italy | (Italy) Riccardo Agostini | 2015 Porsche Carrera Cup Italy season |
| Porsche Carrera Cup Italy | Teams: (San Marino) Tsunami Racing Team | 2015 Porsche Carrera Cup Italy season |
| Porsche Carrera Cup Italy | Michelin Cup: (Italy) Alberto de Amicis | 2015 Porsche Carrera Cup Italy season |
Lamborghini Super Trofeo
| Lamborghini Super Trofeo Europe | Pro: (Finland) Patrick Kujala | 2015 Super Trofeo Europe |
| Lamborghini Super Trofeo Europe | Pro-Am: (Italy) Loris Spinelli | 2015 Super Trofeo Europe |
| Lamborghini Super Trofeo Europe | Am: (Georgia (country)) Shota Abkhazava | 2015 Super Trofeo Europe |
| Lamborghini Super Trofeo Europe | Pro Teams: (Italy) Bonaldi Motorsport | 2015 Super Trofeo Europe |
| Lamborghini Super Trofeo Europe | Pro-Am Teams: (Germany) Leipert Motorsport | 2015 Super Trofeo Europe |
| Lamborghini Super Trofeo Europe | Am Teams: (Russia) Artline Team Georgia | 2015 Super Trofeo Europe |
| Lamborghini Super Trofeo North America | Pro: (United States) Richard Antinucci | 2015 Super Trofeo North America |
| Lamborghini Super Trofeo North America | Pro-Am: (United States) Corey Lewis | 2015 Super Trofeo North America |
| Lamborghini Super Trofeo North America | Am: (United States) Ryan Ockey | 2015 Super Trofeo North America |
| Lamborghini Super Trofeo North America | Teams: (United States) O'Gara Motorsport | 2015 Super Trofeo North America |
| Lamborghini Super Trofeo Asia | (Malaysia) Afiq Yazid | 2015 Super Trofeo Asia |
| Lamborghini Super Trofeo Asia | Pro-Am: (Sri Lanka) Dilantha Malagamuwa; Pro-Am: (India) Armaan Ebrahim | 2015 Super Trofeo Asia |

== Stock car racing ==
| Series | Champion(s) | refer |
|---|---|---|
| ARCA Racing Series | (United States) Grant Enfinger | 2015 ARCA Racing Series |
| Stock Car Brasil | (Brazil) Marcos Gomes | 2015 Stock Car Brasil season |
| Stock Car Brasil | Teams: (Brazil) Voxx Racing | 2015 Stock Car Brasil season |
| Campeonato Brasileiro de Turismo | (Brazil) Marcio Campos | 2015 Campeonato Brasileiro de Turismo season |
| Campeonato Brasileiro de Turismo | Teams: (Brazil) Motortech Competições | 2015 Campeonato Brasileiro de Turismo season |
| Turismo Carretera | (Argentina) Omar Martínez | 2015 Turismo Carretera |
NASCAR
| NASCAR Sprint Cup Series | (United States) Kyle Busch | 2015 NASCAR Sprint Cup Series |
| NASCAR Sprint Cup Series | Manufacturers: (United States) Chevrolet | 2015 NASCAR Sprint Cup Series |
| NASCAR Xfinity Series | (United States) Chris Buescher | 2015 NASCAR Xfinity Series |
| NASCAR Xfinity Series | Manufacturers: (United States) Chevrolet | 2015 NASCAR Xfinity Series |
| NASCAR Camping World Truck Series | (United States) Erik Jones | 2015 NASCAR Camping World Truck Series |
| NASCAR Camping World Truck Series | Manufacturers: (Japan) Toyota | 2015 NASCAR Camping World Truck Series |
| NASCAR Canadian Tire Series | (Canada) Scott Steckly | 2015 NASCAR Canadian Tire Series |
| NASCAR Canadian Tire Series | Manufacturers: (United States) Dodge | 2015 NASCAR Canadian Tire Series |
| NASCAR K&N Pro Series East | (United States) William Byron | 2015 NASCAR K&N Pro Series East |
| NASCAR K&N Pro Series West | (United States) Chris Eggleston | 2015 NASCAR K&N Pro Series West |
| NASCAR Mexico Series | (Mexico) Rubén García Jr. | 2015 NASCAR Mexico Series |
| NASCAR Whelen Modified Tour | (United States) Doug Coby | 2015 NASCAR Whelen Modified Tour |
| NASCAR Whelen Southern Modified Tour | (United States) Andy Seuss | 2015 NASCAR Whelen Southern Modified Tour |
| Whelen Euro Series | (Spain) Ander Vilariño | 2015 NASCAR Whelen Euro Series |
| Whelen Euro Series | Teams: (Italy) GDL Racing | 2015 NASCAR Whelen Euro Series |
| Whelen Euro Series | Division II: (Italy) Gianmarco Ercoli | 2015 NASCAR Whelen Euro Series |
| Whelen Euro Series | Teams: (Italy) GDL Racing | 2015 NASCAR Whelen Euro Series |
| Whelen All-American Series | (United States) Lee Pulliam | |

== Touring car racing ==
| Series | Champion | refer |
|---|---|---|
| World Touring Car Championship | (Argentina) José María López | 2015 World Touring Car Championship |
| World Touring Car Championship | Manufacturers: (France) Citroën | 2015 World Touring Car Championship |
| World Touring Car Championship | Trophy: (Hungary) Norbert Michelisz | 2015 World Touring Car Championship |
| World Touring Car Championship | Trophy Teams: (Italy) ROAL Motorsport | 2015 World Touring Car Championship |
| Deutsche Tourenwagen Masters | (Germany) Pascal Wehrlein | 2015 Deutsche Tourenwagen Masters |
| Deutsche Tourenwagen Masters | Teams: (Germany) HWA AG | 2015 Deutsche Tourenwagen Masters |
| Deutsche Tourenwagen Masters | Manufacturers: (Germany) BMW | 2015 Deutsche Tourenwagen Masters |
| European Touring Car Cup | TC2 Turbo: (Georgia (country)) Davit Kajaia | 2015 European Touring Car Cup |
| European Touring Car Cup | TC2: (Czech Republic) Michal Matějovský | 2015 European Touring Car Cup |
| European Touring Car Cup | Super 1600: (Germany) Niklas Mackschin | 2015 European Touring Car Cup |
| European Touring Car Cup | Single-makes: (Serbia) Dušan Borković | 2015 European Touring Car Cup |
| European Touring Car Cup | Nations Cup: Germany | 2015 European Touring Car Cup |
| Brasileiro de Marcas | (Brazil) Vítor Meira | 2015 Brasileiro de Marcas |
| Brasileiro de Marcas | Teams: (Brazil) JML Racing | 2015 Brasileiro de Marcas |
| Brasileiro de Marcas | Manufacturers: (Japan) Honda | 2015 Brasileiro de Marcas |
| British Touring Car Championship | (United Kingdom) Gordon Shedden | 2015 British Touring Car Championship |
| British Touring Car Championship | Manufacturers: (Japan) Honda | 2015 British Touring Car Championship |
| British Touring Car Championship | Constructors: (United Kingdom) Team Dynamics | 2015 British Touring Car Championship |
| British Touring Car Championship | Teams: (United Kingdom) Team BMR RCIB Insurance | 2015 British Touring Car Championship |
| British Touring Car Championship | Independents' Trophy: (United Kingdom) Colin Turkington | 2015 British Touring Car Championship |
| British Touring Car Championship | Independents' Team: (United Kingdom) Team BMR RCIB Insurance | 2015 British Touring Car Championship |
| British Touring Car Championship | Jack Sears Trophy: (United Kingdom) Josh Cook | 2015 British Touring Car Championship |
| New Zealand V8 Championship | TLX: (Australia) Jason Bargwanna | 2014–15 New Zealand V8 season |
| New Zealand V8 Championship | TL: (New Zealand) Kevin Williams | 2014–15 New Zealand V8 season |
| V8 Supercars Championship | (Australia) Mark Winterbottom | 2015 International V8 Supercars Championship |
| V8 Supercars Championship | Teams: (Australia) Triple Eight Race Engineering | 2015 International V8 Supercars Championship |
| V8 Supercars Championship | Manufacturers: (Australia) Holden | 2015 International V8 Supercars Championship |
| V8 Supercars Championship | Endurance Cup: (Australia) Garth Tander; Endurance Cup: (Australia) Warren Luff | 2015 International V8 Supercars Championship |
| Dunlop V8 Supercar Series | (Australia) Cameron Waters | 2015 V8 Supercars Dunlop Series |
| V8SuperTourers | (New Zealand) Simon Evans | 2014–15 V8SuperTourer season |
| V8SuperTourers | Teams: (New Zealand) Team 4 | 2014–15 V8SuperTourer season |
| V8SuperTourers | Sprint: (New Zealand) Simon Evans | 2014–15 V8SuperTourer season |
| V8SuperTourers | Endurance: (New Zealand) Simon Evans; Endurance: (New Zealand) Shane van Gisbergen | 2014–15 V8SuperTourer season |
| Scandinavian Touring Car Championship | (Sweden) Thed Björk | 2015 Scandinavian Touring Car Championship |
| Scandinavian Touring Car Championship | Teams: (Sweden) Volvo Polestar Racing/Volvo Cyan Racing | 2015 Scandinavian Touring Car Championship |
| Australian Saloon Car Series | (Australia) Gavin Ross | 2015 Australian Saloon Car Series |
| Danish Thundersport Championship | (Denmark) Casper Elgaard | |
| Danish Thundersport Championship | Teams: (Denmark) Massive Motorsport | |
| Danish Thundersport Championship | NTCC: (Norway) Marius Nakken | |
| Danish Thundersport Championship | Rookie: (Denmark) Kasper H. Jensen | |
| Danish Thundersport Championship | Under 21: (Norway) Sebastian Elling Aarvik | |
| Danish Thundersport Championship | Oldboys: (Denmark) Henrik Nøhr | |
| Russian Circuit Racing Series | Touring: (Russia) Aleksey Dudukalo | 2015 Russian Circuit Racing Series |
| Russian Circuit Racing Series | Super-Production: (Russia) Maksim Chernev | 2015 Russian Circuit Racing Series |
| Russian Circuit Racing Series | Touring-Light: (Russia) Dmitry Bragin | 2015 Russian Circuit Racing Series |
| Russian Circuit Racing Series | National: (Russia) Dmitry Bragin | 2015 Russian Circuit Racing Series |
| Russian Circuit Racing Series | National Junior: (Russia) Gleb Kuznetsov | 2015 Russian Circuit Racing Series |
| ADAC Procar Series | Division 1: (Sweden) Fredrik Lestrup | 2015 ADAC Procar Series |
| ADAC Procar Series | Division 2: (Germany) Ralf Glatzel | 2015 ADAC Procar Series |
| ADAC Procar Series | Division 3: (Germany) Steve Kirsch | 2015 ADAC Procar Series |
| Súper Turismo Competición 2000 | (Argentina) Néstor Girolami | |
| Súper Turismo Competición 2000 | Teams: (Argentina) Equipo Fiat Petronas | |
| Súper Turismo Competición 2000 | Manufacturers: (France) Peugeot | |
| Turismo Competición 2000 | (Argentina) Emmanuel Cáceres | |
| Turismo Competición 2000 | Teams: (Argentina) RAM Racing Team Paladini | |
| Turismo Competición 2000 | Manufacturers: (United States) Ford | |
| Top Race V6 | (Argentina) Matías Rodríguez | |
TCR Series
| TCR International Series | (Switzerland) Stefano Comini | 2015 TCR International Series |
| TCR International Series | Teams: (Italy) Target Competition | 2015 TCR International Series |
| TCR Italian Series | (Italy) Valentina Albanese | 2015 TCR Italian Series season |
| TCR Portuguese Series | (Portugal) Francisco Mora | 2015 TCR Portuguese Series season |
| TCR Russian Series | (Russia) Aleksey Dudukalo | 2015 TCR Russian Series season |
| TCR Russian Series | Teams: (Russia) Lukoil Racing Team | 2015 TCR Russian Series season |

== Truck racing ==
| Series | Driver | Season article |
|---|---|---|
| European Truck Racing Championship | (Hungary) Norbert Kiss | 2015 European Truck Racing Championship |
| European Truck Racing Championship | Teams: (Czech Republic) Buggyra International Racing System | 2015 European Truck Racing Championship |
| Fórmula Truck | (Brazil) Leandro Totti | 2015 Fórmula Truck season |
| Fórmula Truck | Teams: (Brazil) RM Competições | 2015 Fórmula Truck season |
| Fórmula Truck | Manufacturers: (Germany) MAN | 2015 Fórmula Truck season |
| Stadium Super Trucks | (United States) Sheldon Creed | 2015 Stadium Super Trucks |
| V8 Ute Racing Series | (Australia) Ryal Harris | 2015 V8 Ute Racing Series |

== See also ==
- List of motorsport championships
- 2015 in motorsports
