= Pontus Åhman =

Swedish rally driver (born 1994)

Personal information
- Nationality: Swedish
- Born: 5 December 1994 (age 31); Uppsala, Sweden

Pontus Lars Mikael Åhman (born 5 December 1994) is a Swedish rally driver, who drives in the Sweden Junior Rally Championship.

In 2015 and 2016, Åhman competed in the ADAC Opel Rallye Cup and finished eighth and third.

== Career results ==
=== ADAC Opel Rallye Cup results ===
Year	Entrant	Car	1	2	3	4	5	6	7	8	Pos.	Points
2015	Pontus Åhman	Opel Adam	SAA; 15	HES; Ret	THÜ; 6	COS; 5	DEU; 10	DEU; 4	OST; 14	3ST; 12	8th	84
2016	Pontus Åhman	Opel Adam	SAA; 8	HES; 3	SUL; 3	THÜ; 1	DEU; Ret	DEU; 2	3ST; 5		3rd	144
