= 2015 ADAC Opel Rallye Cup =

Seasons
- ← 2014 2016 →

The 2015 ADAC Opel Rallye Cup season was the third season of the one-make series for Opel Adam rally cars.

This season was notable for the participation of Yannick Neuville, younger brother of World Rally Championship winning driver Thierry Neuville. The title was won by German Julius Tannert and Luxembourger co-driver Jennifer Thielen. Tannert won 6 of the 8 rallies to be held in 2015, finishing 113 points clear of their next best competitors. Samuli Vuorisalo finished as runner-up, while Yannick Neuville finished third with a win at Rallye Vogelsberg. Jacob Madsen was the only other winner, winning the Ostsee Rallye.

== Calendar ==
| No. | Date | Rally | Winner |
|---|---|---|---|
| 1 | ADAC Saarland-Pfalz Rallye | 6–7 March | Julius Tannert |
| 2 | ADAC Hessen Rallye Vogelsberg | 17–18 April | Yannick Neuville |
| 3 | S–DMV Thüringen Rallye | 15–16 May | Julius Tannert |
| 4 | ADAC Cosmo Rallye Wartburg | 7–9 August | Julius Tannert |
| 5 | Rallye Deutschland | 22 August | Julius Tannert |
| 6 | Rallye Deutschland | 23 August | Julius Tannert |
| 7 | ADAC Ostsee Rallye | 4–5 September | Jacob Madsen |
| 8 | 3-Städte-Rallye | 23–24 October | Julius Tannert |

== Drivers ==
| Team | No. | Driver |
|---|---|---|
| n/a | 30 | (Germany) Tim Wacker |
| n/a | 31 | (Poland) Jerzy Tomaszczyk |
| n/a | 35 | (Germany) Michael Knapp |
| n/a | 40 | (Denmark) Jacob Madsen |
| n/a | 42 | (Germany) Philipp Leger |
| n/a | 49 | (Slovenia) Anze Lemež |
| ADAC Niedersachsen/S. Anhalt | 32 | (Finland) Emil Lindholm |
| RSG Mosbach e.V. im ADAC | 33 | (Germany) Andre Wawrzyniak |
| ADAC Sachsen e.V. | 34 | (Germany) Julius Tannert |
| ADAC Team Hansa | 36 | (Germany) Timo Broda |
| ADAC Mittelrhein e.V. | 37 | (Germany) Patrick Orth |
| ADAC Mittelrhein e.V. | 38 | (Germany) Kevin Müller |
| ADAC Team Südbayern | 39 | (Belgium) Yannick Neuville |
| ADAC Ostwestfalen-Lippe e.V. | 41 | (Germany) Niklas Stötefalke |
| ADAC Ostwestfalen-Lippe e.V. | 44 | (Finland) Laura Suvanto |
| ADAC Ostwestfalen-Lippe e.V. | 46 | (Finland) Samuli Vuorisalo |
| AC Helfenstein e.V. im ADAC | 43 | (Germany) Melanie Schulz |
| Pontus Åhman | 45 | (Sweden) Pontus Åhman |
| ADAC Hessen-Thüringen | 47 | (Germany) Sebastian von Gartzen |
| Team ADAC Weser-Ems | 48 | (Germany) Moritz Neumann |

== Championship standings ==
Points were awarded to the top 20 finishers on the basis below:

| Position | 1st | 2nd | 3rd | 4th | 5th | 6th | 7th | 8th | 9th | 10th | 11th | 12th | 13th | 14th | 15th | 16th | 17th | 18th | 19th | 20th |
| Points | 35 | 27 | 21 | 17 | 16 | 15 | 14 | 13 | 12 | 11 | 10 | 9 | 8 | 7 | 6 | 5 | 4 | 3 | 2 | 1 |

- Additional points were awarded to the top three finishers on each event's Power Stage, on a 3–2–1 basis. Five points were also awarded to the driver with most stage wins at an event.

| Pos | Driver | SAA | HES | THÜ | COS | DEU | | OST | 3ST | Pts |
|---|---|---|---|---|---|---|---|---|---|---|
| 1 | (Germany) Julius Tannert | 1^{7} | 2^{3} | 1 | 1^{8} | 1^{8} | 1^{1} | 3^{2} | 1^{2} | 296 |
| 2 | (Finland) Samuli Vuorisalo | 3 | 12^{2} | 3 | 3^{2} | 2^{2} | 3 | 2^{1} | 2^{1} | 183 |
| 3 | (Belgium) Yannick Neuville | 7^{3} | 1 | Ret | 2 | Ret | 2^{2} | 4 | Ret^{5} | 130 |
| 4 | (Denmark) Jacob Madsen | 2^{1} | Ret^{5} | 10 | Ret | 8 | 12^{8} | 1^{8} | Ret | 122 |
| 5 | (Finland) Emil Lindholm | 6 | 11 | 8 | Ret | 3 | 6 | 9 | 4^{3} | 110 |
| 6 | (Germany) Sebastian von Gartzen | 13 | Ret | 5 | 6^{1} | 7 | 7 | 8 | 10 | 95 |
| 7 | (Germany) Kevin Müller | Ret | 4 | 7 | 15 | 6^{1} | Ret | 6 | 7 | 85 |
| 8 | (Sweden) Pontus Åhman | 15 | Ret | 6 | 5 | 10 | 4 | 14 | 12 | 84 |
| 9 | (Poland) Jerzy Tomaszczyk | 5 | 10 | 2 | Ret | 9 | 8 | Ret | Ret | 82 |
| 10 | (Germany) Patrick Orth | 8 | Ret | 9 | 4 | 5 | 9 | 10 | Ret | 81 |
| 11 | (Germany) Moritz Neumann | 14 | 7 | 11 | 8 | 12 | 5 | 15 | Ret | 76 |
| 12 | (Germany) Niklas Stötefalke | Ret | 3^{1} | Ret | Ret | 4 | 10 | 13 | 5 | 75 |
| 13 | (Germany) Tim Wacker | 10 | 6 | 13 | 14 | Ret | 13 | | 11 | 63 |
| 14 | (Germany) Melanie Schulz | Ret | 13 | 15 | 9 | Ret | 11 | 11 | 9 | 62 |
| 15 | (Germany) Timo Broda | 4 | Ret | 4 | 13 | | | 5 | | 59 |
| 16 | (Germany) Michael Knapp | 9 | 8 | | 12 | 11 | DNS | 7 | Ret | 59 |
| 17 | (Germany) Philipp Leger | 11 | 9 | 14 | 10 | Ret | DNS | | | 41 |
| 18 | (Germany) Andre Wawrzyniak | Ret | 5 | Ret | 11 | | | 12 | Ret | 36 |
| 19 | (Finland) Laura Suvanto | 12 | 14 | 12 | Ret | | | | | 25 |
Guest drivers ineligible for points
| | (Germany) Johannes Fürst | | | | | | | | 3 | 0 |
| | (Czech Republic) Josef Peták | | | | | | | | 6 | 0 |
| | (Germany) René Mandel | | | | 7 | | | | Ret | 0 |
| | (Czech Republic) Robert Hordossy | | | | | | | | 8 | 0 |
| | (Germany) Jürgen von Gartzen | | | | | | | Ret | | 0 |
| | (Czech Republic) Petr Vraj Jr. | | | | | | | | Ret | 0 |
| | (Czech Republic) Matěj Kamenec | | | | | | | | Ret | 0 |
| | (Czech Republic) Martin Mottl | | | | | | | | Ret | 0 |
| Pos | Driver | SAA | HES | THÜ | COS | DEU | | OST | 3ST | Pts |

| Colour | Result |
|---|---|
| Gold | Winner |
| Silver | Second place |
| Bronze | Third place |
| Green | Points classification |
| Blue | Non-points classification |
| Blue | Non-classified finish (NC) |
| Purple | Retired, not classified (Ret) |
| Red | Did not qualify (DNQ) |
| Red | Did not pre-qualify (DNPQ) |
| Black | Disqualified (DSQ) |
| White | Did not start (DNS) |
| White | Withdrew (WD) |
| White | Race cancelled (C) |
| Blank | Did not practice (DNP) |
| Blank | Did not arrive (DNA) |
| Blank | Excluded (EX) |
