= 2016 F4 Spanish Championship =

Inaugural season of the Spanish F4 Championship

The 2016 F4 Spanish Championship was the inaugural season of the Spanish F4 Championship, a motor racing series regulated according to FIA Formula 4 regulations, taking place in Spain and Portugal. The championship featured drivers competing in 1.4 litre Tatuus-Abarth single seat race cars that conformed to the technical regulations for the championship. The series was organised by Koiranen GP and RFEDA. It began on 11 June at the Circuito de Navarra and finished on 16 October at the Circuito del Jarama after 20 races held across seven rounds.

MP Motorsport driver Richard Verschoor dominated the season and sealed the title after taking hat-trick at Jarama. While his team won the teams' championship. Aleksandr Vartanyan finished as runner-up to Verschoor, despite missing a round, but Vartanyan wasn't able to win a race. Tuomas Tujula won a race at Navarra and completed the top-three in the driver standings. Verschoor's teammate Xavier Lloveras won a race at Barcelona and helped MP Motorsport to clinch their first teams' championship in their history. Nikita Volegov and Tuomas Haapalainen were the only other drivers who were eligible to score points due to obligation of competing in at least five rounds. Wildcard drivers Jarno Opmeer, Sebastián Fernández, Juuso Puhakka, Juho Valtanen, Roope Markkanen have visited a podium step (Markkanen won the second race at Navarra).

== Entry list ==
Team	No.	Driver	Rounds
(United Kingdom) Double R Racing	2	(Finland) Elias Niskanen	7
(United Kingdom) Double R Racing	4	(Finland) Tuomas Tujula	All
(United Kingdom) Double R Racing	6	(Finland) Konsta Lappalainen	5, 7
(United Kingdom) Double R Racing	10	(Finland) Juuso Puhakka	2, 7
(United Kingdom) Double R Racing	14	(Finland) Juho Valtanen	1, 3
(United Kingdom) Double R Racing	26	(Australia) Harry Hayek	1
(United Kingdom) Double R Racing	50	(Finland) Tuomas Haapalainen	1–3, 6–7
(United Kingdom) Double R Racing	64	(Finland) Rasmus Markkanen	1
(United Kingdom) Double R Racing	65	(Finland) Roope Markkanen	1
(Spain) Drivex	7	(Russia) Nikita Volegov	All
(Spain) Drivex	31	(Spain) Antolín González	4–6
(Spain) Drivex	41	(Russia) Aleksandr Vartanyan	1–4, 6–7
(Spain) Drivex	88	(Spain) Marta García	4–7
(Netherlands) MP Motorsport	10	(Finland) Juuso Puhakka	1
(Netherlands) MP Motorsport	16	(Netherlands) Jarno Opmeer	1–2
(Netherlands) MP Motorsport	21	(Spain) Xavier Lloveras	All
(Netherlands) MP Motorsport	22	(Netherlands) Richard Verschoor	All
(Netherlands) MP Motorsport	38	(Netherlands) Danny Kroes	2, 4, 7
(Netherlands) MP Motorsport	44	(Venezuela) Sebastián Fernández	3, 5–6

== Race calendar and results ==
The calendar was announced on 10 March 2016. A mid-season change was introduced with the round in Jerez being replaced by Montmeló and ran as a double-header in support of the World Rallycross Championship. But on 12 July calendar was amended again. The Estoril round was changed to Jerez, where it would be in the support of the Formula V8 3.5 Series and Euroformula Open Championship, while the Barcelona round was moved to 2 October and supported Blancpain GT Series Sprint Cup.

Round		Circuit	Date	Pole position	Fastest lap	Winning driver	Winning team	Supporting
1	R1	(Spain) Circuito de Navarra, Los Arcos	11 June	(Netherlands) Richard Verschoor	(Netherlands) Richard Verschoor	(Netherlands) Richard Verschoor	(Netherlands) MP Motorsport	
1	R2	(Spain) Circuito de Navarra, Los Arcos	12 June	(Netherlands) Richard Verschoor	(Netherlands) Richard Verschoor	(Finland) Roope Markkanen	(United Kingdom) Double R Racing	
1	R3	(Spain) Circuito de Navarra, Los Arcos	12 June	(Russia) Aleksandr Vartanyan	(Russia) Aleksandr Vartanyan	(Finland) Tuomas Tujula	(United Kingdom) Double R Racing	
2	R1	(Spain) Ciudad del Motor de Aragón, Alcañiz	25 June	(Netherlands) Jarno Opmeer	(Netherlands) Richard Verschoor	(Netherlands) Richard Verschoor	(Netherlands) MP Motorsport	TCR Spain
2	R2	(Spain) Ciudad del Motor de Aragón, Alcañiz	26 June	(Netherlands) Richard Verschoor	(Netherlands) Richard Verschoor	(Netherlands) Richard Verschoor	(Netherlands) MP Motorsport	TCR Spain
2	R3	(Spain) Ciudad del Motor de Aragón, Alcañiz	26 June	(Netherlands) Richard Verschoor	(Netherlands) Richard Verschoor	(Netherlands) Richard Verschoor	(Netherlands) MP Motorsport	TCR Spain
3	R1	(Portugal) Autódromo Internacional do Algarve, Portimão	9 July	(Netherlands) Richard Verschoor	(Finland) Juho Valtanen	(Netherlands) Richard Verschoor	(Netherlands) MP Motorsport	TCR Portuguese
3	R2	(Portugal) Autódromo Internacional do Algarve, Portimão	10 July	(Netherlands) Richard Verschoor	(Netherlands) Richard Verschoor	(Netherlands) Richard Verschoor	(Netherlands) MP Motorsport	TCR Portuguese
3	R3	(Portugal) Autódromo Internacional do Algarve, Portimão	10 July	(Russia) Aleksandr Vartanyan	(Netherlands) Richard Verschoor	(Netherlands) Richard Verschoor	(Netherlands) MP Motorsport	TCR Portuguese
4	R1	(Spain) Circuit Ricardo Tormo, Cheste	24 September	(Netherlands) Richard Verschoor	(Netherlands) Richard Verschoor	(Netherlands) Richard Verschoor	(Netherlands) MP Motorsport	TCR Spain
4	R2	(Spain) Circuit Ricardo Tormo, Cheste	25 September	(Netherlands) Richard Verschoor	(Netherlands) Richard Verschoor	(Netherlands) Richard Verschoor	(Netherlands) MP Motorsport	TCR Spain
4	R3	(Spain) Circuit Ricardo Tormo, Cheste	25 September	(Netherlands) Richard Verschoor	(Netherlands) Richard Verschoor	(Netherlands) Richard Verschoor	(Netherlands) MP Motorsport	TCR Spain
5	R1	(Spain) Circuit de Barcelona-Catalunya, Montmeló	2 October	(Netherlands) Richard Verschoor	(Netherlands) Richard Verschoor	(Netherlands) Richard Verschoor	(Netherlands) MP Motorsport	Blancpain GT Series Sprint Cup; 24H Series
5	R2	(Spain) Circuit de Barcelona-Catalunya, Montmeló	2 October	(Netherlands) Richard Verschoor	(Netherlands) Richard Verschoor	(Spain) Xavier Lloveras	(Netherlands) MP Motorsport	Blancpain GT Series Sprint Cup; 24H Series
6	R1	(Spain) Circuito del Jarama, Madrid	15 October	(Netherlands) Richard Verschoor	(Finland) Tuomas Haapalainen	(Netherlands) Richard Verschoor	(Netherlands) MP Motorsport	TCR Spain
6	R2	(Spain) Circuito del Jarama, Madrid	16 October	(Netherlands) Richard Verschoor	(Finland) Tuomas Tujula	(Netherlands) Richard Verschoor	(Netherlands) MP Motorsport	TCR Spain
6	R3	(Spain) Circuito del Jarama, Madrid	16 October	(Finland) Tuomas Haapalainen	(Netherlands) Richard Verschoor	(Netherlands) Richard Verschoor	(Netherlands) MP Motorsport	TCR Spain
7	R1	(Spain) Circuito de Jerez, Jerez de la Frontera	29 October	(Russia) Nikita Volegov	(Netherlands) Richard Verschoor	(Netherlands) Richard Verschoor	(Netherlands) MP Motorsport	Formula V8 3.5 Series; Euroformula Open Championship
7	R2	(Spain) Circuito de Jerez, Jerez de la Frontera	29 October	(Netherlands) Richard Verschoor	(Netherlands) Richard Verschoor	(Netherlands) Richard Verschoor	(Netherlands) MP Motorsport	Formula V8 3.5 Series; Euroformula Open Championship
7	R3	(Spain) Circuito de Jerez, Jerez de la Frontera	30 October	(Netherlands) Richard Verschoor	(Netherlands) Richard Verschoor	(Netherlands) Richard Verschoor	(Netherlands) MP Motorsport	Formula V8 3.5 Series; Euroformula Open Championship

== Championship standings ==
Points were awarded to the top 10 classified finishers in each race. No points were awarded for pole position or fastest lap. At Montmeló, only two races were held, and full points were awarded for Race 2. Only drivers, who have competed at least in five rounds were eligible to score championship points.

Races	Position, points per race									
Races	**1st**	**2nd**	**3rd**	**4th**	**5th**	**6th**	**7th**	**8th**	**9th**	**10th**
Races 1 & 3	25	18	15	12	10	8	6	4	2	1
Race 2	15	12	10	8	6	4	2	1		

=== Drivers' championship ===
Pos	Driver	NAV (Spain)			ALC (Spain)			ALG (Portugal)			VAL (Spain)			CAT (Spain)		JAR (Spain)			JER (Spain)			Pts
Pos	Driver	R1	R2	R3	R1	R2	R3	R1	R2	R3	R1	R2	R3	R1	R2	R1	R2	R3	R1	R2	R3	Pts
1	(Netherlands) Richard Verschoor	**1**	2	Ret	1	1	**1**	**1**	1	1	**1**	1	**1**	**1**	**2**	**1**	1	1	1	1	**1**	368
2	(Russia) Aleksandr Vartanyan	2	4	**6**	3	2	7	3	2	**2**	4	3	4			4	5	4	3	2	2	244
3	(Finland) Tuomas Tujula	6	11	1	8	6	8	4	5	4	Ret	Ret	8	2	4	2	2	3	4	4	3	222
4	(Spain) Xavier Lloveras	5	5	Ret	4	9	2	5	7	6	2	2	2	DNS	1	7	4	2	Ret	5	10	197
5	(Russia) Nikita Volegov	7	6	7	6	8	5	8	8	7	3	4	3	4	5	6	7	6	**2**	3	7	188
6	(Finland) Tuomas Haapalainen	10	9	5	7	7	9	7	6	5						3	3	**5**	Ret	8	6	139
Wild card drivers ineligible for position in the championship
	(Netherlands) Jarno Opmeer	3	3	4	**2**	3	3															0
	(Spain) Marta García										5	5	6	5	6	8	8	7	5	7	5	0
	(Venezuela) Sebastián Fernández							6	4	Ret				3	3	5	6	8				0
	(Finland) Juuso Puhakka	9	8	3	Ret	5	4												Ret	Ret	4	0
	(Netherlands) Danny Kroes				5	4	6				Ret	6	5						Ret	6	8	0
	(Finland) Juho Valtanen	Ret	7	9				2	3	3												0
	(Finland) Roope Markkanen	4	1	2																		0
	(Spain) Antolín González										Ret	7	7	6	8	Ret	Ret	9				0
	(Finland) Konsta Lappalainen													7	7				6	9	9	0
	(Finland) Rasmus Markkanen	8	10	8																		0
	(Finland) Elias Niskanen																		7	10	Ret	0
	(Australia) Harry Hayek	Ret	DNS	DNS																		0
Pos	Driver	R1	R2	R3	R1	R2	R3	R1	R2	R3	R1	R2	R3	R1	R2	R1	R2	R3	R1	R2	R3	Pts
Pos	Driver	NAV (Spain)			ALC (Spain)			ALG (Portugal)			VAL (Spain)			CAT (Spain)		JAR (Spain)			JER (Spain)			Pts

Colour	Result
Gold	Winner
Silver	Second place
Bronze	Third place
Green	Points classification
Blue	Non-points classification
Blue	Non-classified finish (NC)
Purple	Retired, not classified (Ret)
Red	Did not qualify (DNQ)
Red	Did not pre-qualify (DNPQ)
Black	Disqualified (DSQ)
White	Did not start (DNS)
White	Withdrew (WD)
White	Race cancelled (C)
Blank	Did not practice (DNP)
Blank	Did not arrive (DNA)
Blank	Excluded (EX)

**Bold** – Pole
Italics – Fastest Lap

=== Teams' championship ===
Pos	Team	NAV (Spain)			ALC (Spain)			ALG (Portugal)			VAL (Spain)			CAT (Spain)		JAR (Spain)			JER (Spain)			Pts
Pos	Team	R1	R2	R3	R1	R2	R3	R1	R2	R3	R1	R2	R3	R1	R2	R1	R2	R3	R1	R2	R3	Pts
1	(Netherlands) MP Motorsport	1	2	Ret	1	1	1	1	1	1	1	1	1	1	1	1	1	1	1	1	1	616
1	(Netherlands) MP Motorsport	5	5	Ret	4	9	2	5	7	6	2	2	2	DNS	2	7	4	2	Ret	5	10	616
2	(Spain) Drivex	2	4	6	3	2	5	3	2	2	3	3	3	4	5	4	5	4	2	2	2	452
2	(Spain) Drivex	7	6	7	6	8	7	8	8	7	4	4	4			6	7	6	3	3	7	452
3	(United Kingdom) Double R Racing	6	9	1	7	6	8	4	5	4	Ret	Ret	8	2	4	2	2	3	4	4	3	371
3	(United Kingdom) Double R Racing	10	11	5	8	7	9	7	6	5						3	3	5	Ret	8	6	371
Pos	Team	R1	R2	R3	R1	R2	R3	R1	R2	R3	R1	R2	R3	R1	R2	R1	R2	R3	R1	R2	R3	Pts
Pos	Team	NAV (Spain)			ALC (Spain)			ALG (Portugal)			VAL (Spain)			CAT (Spain)		JAR (Spain)			JER (Spain)			Pts
