= 2016 Trofeo de España TCR =

Spanish TCR touring car race

The 2016 Trofeo de España TCR was the first season of the TCR Spanish Series. The championship was run as the first class of the Campeonato de España de Resistencia.

== Teams and drivers ==
Michelin is the official tyre supplier.

Team	Car	No.	Drivers	Rounds
(France) Michaël Lepoutre	SEAT León Cup Racer	1	(Spain) Álvaro Fontes	All
(France) Michaël Lepoutre	SEAT León Cup Racer	1	(France) Michaël Lepoutre	All
(France) Michaël Lepoutre	SEAT León Cup Racer	1	(Spain) José Manuel de los Milagros	3–4
(Spain) PCR Sport	SEAT León Cup Racer	3	(Spain) Antonio Aristi	All
(Spain) PCR Sport	SEAT León Cup Racer	3	(Spain) Harriet Arruabarrena	All
(Spain) PCR Sport	SEAT León Cup Racer	3	(Spain) Jordi Masdeu	All
(Spain) PCR Sport	SEAT León Cup Racer	6	(Spain) Vicente Dasi	All
(Spain) PCR Sport	SEAT León Cup Racer	6	(Spain) Josep Parera	1–4
(Spain) PCR Sport	SEAT León Cup Racer	6	(Spain) Guillermo Aso	3–5
(Spain) PCR Sport	SEAT León Cup Racer	19	(Spain) Unai Arruabarrena	All
(Spain) PCR Sport	SEAT León Cup Racer	19	(Spain) Óscar Fernández	All
(Spain) PCR Sport	SEAT León Cup Racer	19	(Spain) Iñigo Vigiola	All
(Spain) PCR Sport	SEAT León Cup Racer	49	(Spain) Javier Basagoiti	5
(Spain) PCR Sport	SEAT León Cup Racer	49	(Spain) Manuel Capelo	5
(Spain) Jaime Carbó	SEAT León Cup Racer	5	(Spain) Jaime Carbó	1–3, 5
(Spain) Jaime Carbó	SEAT León Cup Racer	5	(Spain) Alan Sicart	1–3, 5
(Spain) Monlau Competicion	SEAT León Cup Racer	7	(Italy) Gianluigi Vucunanza	5
(Spain) Monlau Competicion	SEAT León Cup Racer	7	(Spain) Álex Cosin	5
(Spain) Monlau Competicion	SEAT León Cup Racer	98	(Thailand) Pure Hongsapang	3
(Spain) Monlau Competicion	SEAT León Cup Racer	98	(Thailand) Munkong Sathienthirakul	3
(Spain) Escuderia Baix Camp	SEAT León Cup Racer	12	(Spain) Raul Martínez Bedmar	3
(Spain) Escuderia Baix Camp	SEAT León Cup Racer	12	(Spain) Ruben Martinez	3
(Spain) RC2 Junior Team	SEAT León Cup Racer	12	(Spain) Raul Martínez Bedmar	4–5
(Spain) RC2 Junior Team	SEAT León Cup Racer	12	(Spain) Ruben Martinez	4–5
(Spain) RC2 Junior Team	SEAT León Cup Racer	21	(Spain) Antonio Pérez	1, 3–5
(Spain) RC2 Junior Team	SEAT León Cup Racer	21	(Spain) Lluis Llobet	1, 3–5
(Spain) Baporo Motorsport	SEAT León Cup Racer	13	(Andorra) Joan Vinyes	1, 3, 5
(Spain) Baporo Motorsport	SEAT León Cup Racer	13	(Spain) Marc Carol	3
(Spain) Baporo Motorsport	SEAT León Cup Racer	13	(Andorra) Amalia Vinyes	1–2, 4
(Spain) Baporo Motorsport	SEAT León Cup Racer	33	(Andorra) Amalia Vinyes	5
(Spain) Baporo Motorsport	SEAT León Cup Racer	63	(Russia) Evgeniy Makushin	All
(Spain) Baporo Motorsport	SEAT León Cup Racer	63	(Russia) Zakhar Makushin	1–2, 4–5
(Spain) Baporo Motorsport	SEAT León Cup Racer	63	(Russia) Yuriy Makushin	2–3
(Spain) Baporo Motorsport	SEAT León Cup Racer	63	(Spain) José Manuel Pérez-Aicart	3–4
(Spain) Baporo Motorsport	SEAT León Cup Racer	93	(Spain) Jaime Font	All
(Spain) Baporo Motorsport	SEAT León Cup Racer	93	(Spain) Faust Salom	All
(Spain) A.D. Desguaces La Torre	SEAT León Cup Racer	14	(Spain) Ismael Arquero	4–5
(France) Bruno Cosin	SEAT León Cup Racer	55	(France) Bruno Cosin	1, 4–5
(France) Bruno Cosin	SEAT León Cup Racer	55	(France) Jacques-André Dupuy	1
(France) Bruno Cosin	SEAT León Cup Racer	55	(France) Denis Gibaud	4–5

== Calendar and results ==
The 2016 schedule was announced on 7 January 2016, with one out of five events was scheduled to be held outside Spain, at Lédenon. It was replaced on 12 April 2016 by a round at Navarra. The race format is divided into Endurance and Sprint races: the first one contemplates a two-hour + 1 lap long race, the second one is formed by two 48-minute + 1 lap long races.

Rnd.		Circuit	Date	Pole position	Fastest lap	Winning driver	Winning team	Supporting
1	1	Circuit de Barcelona-Catalunya, Montmeló	3 April	(Spain) Jaime Font (Spain) Faust Salom	(Andorra) Amalia Vinyes (Andorra) Joan Vinyes	(Spain) Jaime Font (Spain) Faust Salom	(Spain) Baporo Motorsport	Copa Renault Clio España
2	2	Circuito de Navarra, Los Arcos	22 May	(Spain) Jaime Font (Spain) Faust Salom	(Spain) Jaime Font (Spain) Faust Salom	(Spain) Jaime Font (Spain) Faust Salom	(Spain) Baporo Motorsport	
3	3	Ciudad del Motor de Aragón, Alcañiz	26 June	(Spain) Jaime Font (Spain) Faust Salom	(Andorra) Joan Vinyes (Spain) Marc Carol	(Andorra) Joan Vinyes (Spain) Marc Carol	(Spain) Baporo Motorsport	F4 Spanish Championship
3	4	Ciudad del Motor de Aragón, Alcañiz	26 June		(Russia) Evgeniy Makushin (Russia) Yuriy Makushin (Spain) José Manuel Pérez-Aicart	(Russia) Evgeniy Makushin (Russia) Yuriy Makushin (Spain) José Manuel Pérez-Aicart	(Spain) Baporo Motorsport	F4 Spanish Championship
4	5	Circuit Ricardo Tormo, Cheste	25 September	(Spain) Antonio Aristi (Spain) Harriet Arruabarrena (Spain) Jordi Masdeu	(Spain) Jaime Font (Spain) Faust Salom	(Spain) Álvaro Fontes (France) Michaël Lepoutre (Spain) José Manuel de los Milagros	(France) Michaël Lepoutre	F4 Spanish Championship
4	6	Circuit Ricardo Tormo, Cheste	25 September		(Spain) Jaime Font (Spain) Faust Salom	(Andorra) Amalia Vinyes	(Spain) Baporo Motorsport	F4 Spanish Championship
5	7	Circuito del Jarama, Madrid	16 October		(Andorra) Joan Vinyes	(Spain) Jaime Font (Spain) Faust Salom	(Spain) Baporo Motorsport	F4 Spanish Championship

== Championship standings ==
=== Scoring system ===
Position	1st	2nd	3rd	4th	5th	6th	7th	8th	9th	10th	11th	12th	13th	14th	15th	16th	17th	18th	19th	20th
Endurance races	52	48	44	36	32	28	24	20	18	16	14	12	10	8	6	5	4	3	2	1
Sprint races	40	36	32	24	20	16	14	10	8	6	5	4	3	2	1					

=== Drivers' championship ===
Pos.	Driver	BAR	NAV	ALC		VAL		JAR	Pts.
Pos.	Driver	RDU	RDU	RD1	RD2	RD1	RD2	RDU	Pts.
1	(Spain) Jaime Font (Spain) Faust Salom	**1**	**1**	**2**	2	8	2	1	264 (274)
2	(Russia) Evgeniy Makushin	6	2	Ret	1	6	3	4	198
3	(Spain) Antonio Aristi (Spain) Harriet Arruabarrena	4	6	3	5	**2**	5	9	172 (190)
4	(Andorra) Joan Vinyes	2		1	3			3	164
5	(Andorra) Amalia Vinyes	2	Ret			4	1	2	160
6	(Russia) Zakhar Makushin	6	2			7	3	4	158
7	(Spain) Álvaro Fontes (France) Michaël Lepoutre	7	3	Ret	4	1	4	Ret	156
8	(Spain) Unai Arruabarrena (Spain) Óscar Fernández	3	5	9	10	5	6	Ret	126
9	(Spain) Jaime Carbó (Spain) Alan Sicart	8	4	5	Ret			5	108
10	(Spain) Vicente Dasi	5	7	4	8	10	8	Ret	106
11	(Spain) Jordi Masdeu	4	6					9	82
12	(Spain) Raul Martínez Bedmar (Spain) Ruben Martinez			6	6	3	7	Ret	78
13	(Spain) Iñigo Vigiola	3	5					Ret	76
14	(Spain) Antonio Pérez (Spain) Lluis Llobet	9		8	9	11	9	7	73
15	(Spain) Marc Carol			1	3				72
16	(Spain) Josep Parera	5	7			10	8		72
17	(Russia) Yuriy Makushin		2						48
18	(Spain) José Manuel Pérez-Aicart			Ret	1				40
19	(Spain) Guillermo Aso			4	8				34
20	(Italy) Gianluigi Vicinanza (Spain) Álex Cosin					6	6		28
21	(Thailand) Munkong Sathienthirakul (Thailand) Pure Hongsapang			7	7				28
22	(France) Bruno Cosin	Ret				6	10	Ret	22
23	(France) Denis Gibaud					6	10	Ret	22
24	(Spain) Javier Basagoiti (Spain) Manuel Capelo							8	20
25	(Spain) Ismael Arquero					9	11	Ret	13
-	(France) Jacques-André Dupuy	WD							0
Pos.	Driver	BAR	NAV	ALC		VAL		JAR	Pts.

Colour	Result
Gold	Winner
Silver	Second place
Bronze	Third place
Green	Points classification
Blue	Non-points classification
Blue	Non-classified finish (NC)
Purple	Retired, not classified (Ret)
Red	Did not qualify (DNQ)
Red	Did not pre-qualify (DNPQ)
Black	Disqualified (DSQ)
White	Did not start (DNS)
White	Withdrew (WD)
White	Race cancelled (C)
Blank	Did not practice (DNP)
Blank	Did not arrive (DNA)
Blank	Excluded (EX)

**Bold** – Pole
Italics – Fastest Lap

† – Drivers did not finish the race, but were classified as they completed over 75% of the race distance.
