= 2022 Australian Formula 3 Championship =

Motor racing championship held in 2022

Seasons
- ← 2021 2023 (Australian Formula Open Series) →

The 2022 Australian Formula 3 Championship is an Australian open-wheel racing series for FIA Formula 3 cars constructed and conforming to the regulations before and including 2016, having previously been before and including 2011 the previous season. Organized by Formula Three Management Pty Ltd, it is to be the 22nd season of Australian Formula 3, with the 2020 and 2021 season having been cancelled due to the COVID-19 pandemic.

== Teams and drivers ==
The following teams and drivers contested the 2022 Australian Formula 3 Championship. All teams are Australian-registered.

| Team | Chassis | Engine | No. | Driver | Class | Rounds |
|---|---|---|---|---|---|---|
| Roesler Motorsport | Tatuus FT50 | Ford | 4 | (Australia) Matthew Roesler | I | 2 |
| R-Tek Motorsport | Dallara F305/07 | Opel-Spiess | 6 | (Australia) Max de Meyrick | N | 1 |
| R-Tek Motorsport | Dallara F305/07 | Opel-Spiess | 7 | (Australia) Andrew Roberts | N | 1 |
| R-Tek Motorsport | Dallara F305/07 | Opel-Spiess | 7 | (Australia) Roman Krumins | N | 2–6 |
| R-Tek Motorsport | Dallara F308/11 | Mercedes | 8 | (Australia) Mitchell Neilson | C | All |
| R-Tek Motorsport | Dallara F302/04 | Opel-Spiess | 23 | (Australia) Bo Jensen | N | 2 |
| Tim Macrow Racing | Mygale M08/11 | Mercedes | 9 | (Australia) Ross McAlpine | C | 1–2, 4 |
| Tim Macrow Racing | Dallara F308/11 | Mercedes | 24 | (Australia) Ryan How | C | 2, 6 |
| Tim Macrow Racing | Dallara F308/11 | Mercedes | 25 | (Australia) Ben Taylor | C | 1–5 |
| Tim Macrow Racing | Dallara F308/11 | Mercedes | 25 | (Australia) Winston Van Laarhove | C | 6 |
| Tim Macrow Racing | Dallara F308/11 | Mercedes | 27 | (Australia) Ethan Brown | C | 3–6 |
| Tim Macrow Racing | Dallara F312/16 | Mercedes | 74 | (Australia) Trent Grubel | C | 1–3 |
| Gilmour Racing | Dallara F308/11 | Mercedes | 17 | (Australia) Noah Sands | C | All |
| Gilmour Racing | Dallara F305/07 | Mercedes | 3 | (Australia) Chris Gilmour | C | 4 |
| Gilmour Racing | Mygale M05/07 | Mercedes | 34 | (Australia) Trent Grubel | C | 4–6 |
| Ruff Racing | Dallara F305/07 | Mercedes | 22 | (Australia) Gerrit Ruff | N | 1–2 |
| DiBiase Motorsport | Tatuus FT50 | Ford | 27 | (Australia) Paul DiBiase | I | 2 |
| Team Woodland | Tatuus FT50 | Ford | 53 | (Australia) Matthew Woodland | I | 2 |
| Slusarski Racing | Tatuus FT50 | Ford | 93 | (Australia) Chris Slusarski | I | 2 |
| 99 Motorsport | Dallara F308/11 | Volkswagen | 99 | (Australia) Ryan Astley | C | All |
| Simworkx Simulators | Hyper X1 | Suzuki | 58 | (Australia) Luke Klaver | I | 3 |

| Icon | Class |
|---|---|
| C | Championship |
| N | National |
| I | Invitational |

=== Classes ===
Competing cars were nominated into one of three classes:

- Championship Class – for automobiles constructed in accordance with the FIA Formula 3 regulations that applied in the year of manufacture between 1 January 2002 and 31 December 2016. It was announced that new for this season, all cars entered would qualify for Championship Class.
- National Class – for automobiles constructed in accordance with the FIA Formula 3 regulations that applied in the year of manufacture between 1 January 2002 and 31 December 2007.
- Invitation Category – for automobiles constructed in accordance with the FIA Formula 3 regulations that applied in the year of manufacture before 2002, as well as other open wheel ‘wings and slicks’ cars including Formula 1000, Formula Ford 2000, Formula Renault, Formula BMW, TRS, Formula 4, etc.

| Round | | Circuit | Date | Pole position | Fastest lap | Championship Class Winner | National Class Winner |
|---|---|---|---|---|---|---|---|
| 1 | (New South Wales) Sydney Motorsport Park | 19 February | R1 | (Australia) Mitchell Neilson | (Australia) Trent Grubel | (Australia) Trent Grubel | (Australia) Noah Sands |
| 1 | (New South Wales) Sydney Motorsport Park | 19 February | R2 | | (Australia) Mitchell Neilson | (Australia) Trent Grubel | (Australia) Mitchell Neilson |
| 1 | (New South Wales) Sydney Motorsport Park | 19 February | R3 | | (Australia) Trent Grubel | (Australia) Trent Grubel | (Australia) Noah Sands |
| 2 | (South Australia) The Bend Motorsport Park | 24 April | R1 | (Australia) Trent Grubel | (Australia) Trent Grubel | (Australia) Trent Grubel | (Australia) Roman Krumins |
| 2 | (South Australia) The Bend Motorsport Park | 24 April | R2 | | (Australia) Trent Grubel | (Australia) Trent Grubel | (Australia) Gerrit Ruff |
| 2 | (South Australia) The Bend Motorsport Park | 24 April | R3 | | (Australia) Trent Grubel | (Australia) Trent Grubel | (Australia) Roman Krumins |
| 3 | (Victoria (state)) Winton Motor Raceway | 12 June | R1 | (Australia) Ryan Astley | (Australia) Noah Sands | (Australia) Ryan Astley | (Australia) Roman Krumins |
| 3 | (Victoria (state)) Winton Motor Raceway | 12 June | R2 | | (Australia) Noah Sands | (Australia) Noah Sands | (Australia) Roman Krumins |
| 3 | (Victoria (state)) Winton Motor Raceway | 12 June | R3 | | (Australia) Noah Sands | (Australia) Noah Sands | (Australia) Roman Krumins |
| 4 | Queensland Raceway | 21 August | R1 | (Australia) Noah Sands | (Australia) Noah Sands | (Australia) Noah Sands | (Australia) Roman Krumins |
| 4 | Queensland Raceway | 21 August | R2 | | (Australia) Noah Sands | (Australia) Noah Sands | (Australia) Roman Krumins |
| 4 | Queensland Raceway | 21 August | R3 | | (Australia) Noah Sands | (Australia) Noah Sands | (Australia) Roman Krumins |
| 5 | (New South Wales) Sydney Motorsport Park | 2 October | R1 | (Australia) Noah Sands | (Australia) Noah Sands | (Australia) Noah Sands | (Australia) Roman Krumins |
| 5 | (New South Wales) Sydney Motorsport Park | 2 October | R2 | | (Australia) Noah Sands | (Australia) Noah Sands | (Australia) Roman Krumins |
| 5 | (New South Wales) Sydney Motorsport Park | 2 October | R3 | | (Australia) Noah Sands | (Australia) Noah Sands | (Australia) Roman Krumins |
| 6 | (Victoria (state)) Phillip Island Grand Prix Circuit (Note: Prior to the Phillip Island event, a new competition known as the Australian Formula Open was launched. This competition ran various types of machinery in several different classes, with Class 1 effectively absorbing the Australian Formula 3 entries. The results of Class 1 only counted towards the 2022 Australian Formula 3 Championship.) | 27 November | R1 | (Australia) Trent Grubel | (Australia) Mitchell Neilson | (Australia) Trent Grubel | (Australia) Roman Krumins |
| 6 | (Victoria (state)) Phillip Island Grand Prix Circuit | 27 November | R2 | | (Australia) Ethan Brown | (Australia) Trent Grubel | (Australia) Roman Krumins |
| 6 | (Victoria (state)) Phillip Island Grand Prix Circuit | 27 November | R3 | Race abandoned due to poor weather conditions. | | | |

== Championship standings ==
Points system

Points for are awarded as follows:

| Position | 1st | 2nd | 3rd | 4th | 5th | 6th | 7th | 8th | 9th | 10th | FL | Pole |
|---|---|---|---|---|---|---|---|---|---|---|---|---|
| Race 1 and 2 | 12 | 9 | 8 | 7 | 6 | 5 | 4 | 3 | 2 | 1 | 1 | 1 |
| Race 3 | 20 | 15 | 12 | 10 | 8 | 6 | 4 | 3 | 2 | 1 | 1 | 1 |

=== Drivers' championship ===
| Pos | Driver | SYD1 | | | BEN | | | WIN | | | QLD | | | SYD2 | | | PHI | | Pts |
|---|---|---|---|---|---|---|---|---|---|---|---|---|---|---|---|---|---|---|---|
| 1 | (Australia) Noah Sands | 1 | 4 | 1 | 2 | 3 | 2 | **2** | 1 | 1 | **3** | 1 | 1 | **1** | 1 | 1 | 2 | 6 | 223 |
| 2 | (Australia) Trent Grubel | 2 | 1 | 2 | **1** | 1 | 1 | DNS | DNS | DNS | 1 | 3 | 2 | 2 | 2 | 4 | **1** | 1 | 173 |
| 3 | (Australia) Mitchell Neilson | **3** | 2 | 4 | DNS | 2 | 3 | 4 | 4 | 3 | 2 | Ret | 6 | 3 | 3 | 2 | 4 | 2 | 139 |
| 4 | (Australia) Ryan Astley | DNS | 6 | 7 | 3 | 6 | 4 | 1 | 3 | 2 | 5 | 5 | 4 | 4 | 5 | 5 | 5 | Ret | 116 |
| 5 | (Australia) Ethan Brown | | | | | | | 3 | 2 | 5 | 6 | 4 | 5 | 5 | 4 | 3 | 3 | 3 | 87 |
| 6 | (Australia) Roman Krumins | | | | 5 | Ret | 8 | 6 | 6 | 4 | 7 | 6 | 7 | 7 | 6 | 6 | 6 | 7 | 69 |
| 7 | (Australia) Ben Taylor | 4 | 5 | 5 | 4 | 5 | 5 | DNS | DNS | DNS | DNS | DNS | DNS | 6 | Ret | Ret | | | 47 |
| 8 | (Australia) Chris Gilmour | | | | | | | | | | 4 | 2 | 3 | | | | | | 28 |
| 9 | (Australia) Ryan How | | | | DNS | 4 | 6 | | | | | | | | | | 7 | 4 | 24 |
| 10 | (Australia) Max DeMeyrick | Ret | 3 | 3 | | | | | | | | | | | | | | | 20 |
| 11 | (Australia) Ross McAlpine | 6 | 8 | 9 | 9 | 10 | Ret | | | | 8 | DNS | DNS | | | | | | 19 |
| 12 | (Australia) Andrew Roberts | 5 | 7 | 6 | | | | | | | | | | | | | | | 16 |
| 13 | (Australia) Gerrit Ruff | Ret | DNS | 8 | 6 | 7 | 9 | | | | | | | | | | | | 15 |
| 14 | (Australia) Winston Van Laarhove | | | | | | | | | | | | | | | | 8 | 5 | 9 |
| 15 | (Australia) Bo Jensen | | | | 8 | Ret | Ret | | | | | | | | | | | | 4 |
Invitational drivers ineligible to score points
| - | (Australia) Luke Klaver | | | | | | | 5 | 5 | 6 | | | | | | | | | - |
| - | (Australia) Chris Slusarski | | | | 7 | 8 | 7 | | | | | | | | | | | | - |
| - | (Australia) Paul DiBiase | | | | 11 | 9 | 10 | | | | | | | | | | | | - |
| - | (Australia) Matthew Roesler | | | | 10 | 11 | 11 | | | | | | | | | | | | - |
| - | (Australia) Matthew Woodland | | | | 12 | 12 | 12 | | | | | | | | | | | | - |
| Pos | Driver | SYD1 | | | BEN | | | WIN | | | QLD | | | SYD2 | | | PHI | | Pts |

| Colour | Result |
|---|---|
| Gold | Winner |
| Silver | Second place |
| Bronze | Third place |
| Green | Points classification |
| Blue | Non-points classification |
| Blue | Non-classified finish (NC) |
| Purple | Retired, not classified (Ret) |
| Red | Did not qualify (DNQ) |
| Red | Did not pre-qualify (DNPQ) |
| Black | Disqualified (DSQ) |
| White | Did not start (DNS) |
| White | Withdrew (WD) |
| White | Race cancelled (C) |
| Blank | Did not practice (DNP) |
| Blank | Did not arrive (DNA) |
| Blank | Excluded (EX) |

Bold – Pole
Italics – Fastest lap
