= 2018 Australian Formula 3 Premier Series =

Motor racing competition

Seasons
- ← 2017 2019 →

The 2018 Australian Formula 3 Premier Series was an Australian open-wheel racing series for FIA Formula 3 cars constructed and conforming to the regulations before and including 2011. The series began on 10 March 2018 at Winton Motor Raceway and concluded on 21 October 2018 at The Bend Motorsport Park. Organised by Formula Three Management Pty Ltd, it was the third running of the Australian Formula 3 Premier Series.

The series was won by Harri Jones driving a Dallara F311 Mercedes-Benz.

== Teams and drivers ==
The following teams and drivers contested the 2018 Australian Formula 3 Premier Series. All teams and drivers were Australian-registered.

Team	Chassis	Engine	No.	Driver	Class	Rounds
Jason Hore Racing	Dallara F304	Opel-Spiess	2	(Australia) Jason Hore	N	2–3
Gilmour Racing	Dallara F307	Mercedes	3	(Australia) Richard Peasey	N	3
Gilmour Racing	Dallara F307	Mercedes	18	(Australia) Chris Gilmour	P	2
Gilmour Racing	Dallara F311	Mercedes	73	(Australia) Cameron Shields	P	All
R-Tek Motorsport	Dallara F304	Opel-Spiess	5	(Australia) Andrew Roberts	N	All
R-Tek Motorsport	Dallara F307	Opel-Spiess	6	(Australia) Roman Krumins	N	1–3, 5–6
R-Tek Motorsport	Dallara F311	Mercedes	8	(Australia) Alex Barboutis	P	1
R-Tek Motorsport	Dallara F311	Mercedes	8	(Australia) John Magro	P	4, 6
Jones Racing	Dallara F311	Mercedes	12	(Australia) Harri Jones	P	All
Blake Varney Racing	Dallara F304	Opel-Spiess	16	(Australia) Blake Varney	N	2–3
Ruff Racing	Dallara F307	Mercedes	22	(Australia) Gerrit Ruff	N	1, 5–6
Wilson Team Racing	Dallara F307	Opel-Spiess	27	(Australia) Shane Wilson	N	1, 3–6
Com Sec Racing	Tatuus FR2.0	Renault	43	(Australia) Rielly Brook	T	2
Flo Fast Racing	Dallara F304	Renault-Sodemo	66	(Australia) Bruce McKenzie	N	1–3, 5
Shelby-James Motorsport	Dallara F398	Opel-Spiess	75	(Australia) Ian Shelby-James	T	3–4
Ross McAlpine	Mygale M11	Mercedes	81	(Australia) Ross McAlpine	P	3–4, 6

Icon	Class
P	Premier Class
N	National Class
T	Trophy Class

=== Classes ===
Competing cars were nominated into one of three classes:

- Premier Class – for automobiles constructed in accordance with the FIA Formula 3 regulations that applied in the year of manufacture between 1 January 2005 and 31 December 2011.
- National Class – for automobiles constructed in accordance with the FIA Formula 3 regulations that applied in the year of manufacture between 1 January 2002 and 31 December 2007.
- Trophy Class.

== Calendar & race results ==
The series was contested over six rounds. All rounds were held in Australia.

Round		Circuit	Date	Premier Class Winner	National Class Winner	Trophy Class Winner
1	1	Winton Motor Raceway	10 March	(Australia) Cameron Shields	(Australia) Roman Krumins	no competitors
1	2	Winton Motor Raceway	11 March	(Australia) Harri Jones	(Australia) Gerrit Ruff	no competitors
1	3	Winton Motor Raceway	11 March	(Australia) Cameron Shields	(Australia) Roman Krumins	no competitors
2	1	Queensland Raceway	21 April	(Australia) Harri Jones	(Australia) Jason Hore	(Australia) Rielly Brook
2	2	Queensland Raceway	21 April	(Australia) Cameron Shields	(Australia) Roman Krumins	(Australia) Rielly Brook
2	3	Queensland Raceway	22 April	(Australia) Cameron Shields	(Australia) Jason Hore	(Australia) Rielly Brook
3	1	Morgan Park Raceway	9 June	(Australia) Harri Jones	(Australia) Richard Peasey	no finishers
3	2	Morgan Park Raceway	10 June	(Australia) Harri Jones	(Australia) Richard Peasey	no finishers
3	3	Morgan Park Raceway	10 June	(Australia) Cameron Shields	(Australia) Richard Peasey	no finishers
4	1	Sydney Motorsport Park	30 June	(Australia) Harri Jones	(Australia) Shane Wilson	no finishers
4	2	Sydney Motorsport Park	1 July	(Australia) Harri Jones	(Australia) Shane Wilson	no finishers
4	3	Sydney Motorsport Park	1 July	(Australia) Harri Jones	(Australia) Shane Wilson	no finishers
5	1	Wakefield Park	8 September	(Australia) Harri Jones	(Australia) Roman Krumins	no competitors
5	2	Wakefield Park	9 September	(Australia) Harri Jones	(Australia) Roman Krumins	no competitors
5	3	Wakefield Park	9 September	(Australia) Cameron Shields	(Australia) Roman Krumins	no competitors
6	1	The Bend Motorsport Park	20 October	(Australia) Harri Jones	(Australia) Roman Krumins	no competitors
6	2	The Bend Motorsport Park	21 October	(Australia) Harri Jones	(Australia) Roman Krumins	no competitors
6	3	The Bend Motorsport Park	21 October	(Australia) Cameron Shields	(Australia) Roman Krumins	no competitors

== Championship standings ==
Points system

Points for are awarded as follows:

Position	1st	2nd	3rd	4th	5th	6th	7th	8th	9th	10th	FL	Pole
Race 1 and 2	12	9	8	7	6	5	4	3	2	1	1	1
Race 3	20	15	12	10	8	6	4	3	2	1	1	1

=== Drivers' championship ===
Pos	Driver	WIN			QLD			MOR			SYD			WAK			BEN			Pts
Premier
1	(Australia) Harri Jones	2	1	2	1	2	2	1	1	2	1	1	1	1	1	2	1	1	2	243
2	(Australia) Cameron Shields	1	2	1	2	1	1	3	2	1	2	3	3	2	2	1	2	2	1	239
3	(Australia) Ross McAlpine							Ret	8	9	6	Ret	DNS				5	Ret	6	47
4	(Australia) John Magro										3	2	2				DNS	DNS	DNS	32
5	(Australia) Alexander Barboutis	3	3	3																28
6	(Australia) Chris Gilmour				3	6	3													28
National
1	(Australia) Roman Krumins	4	5	4	5	3	5	4	4	4				3	3	3	4	3	3	205
2	(Australia) Andrew Roberts	DNS	Ret	DNS	6	7	6	8	5	5	5	5	5	4	4	Ret	6	4	5	133
3	(Australia) Shane Wilson	5	6	6				7	9	7	4	4	4	6	7	4	EX	EX	EX	124
4	(Australia) Gerrit Ruff	6	4	5										5	5	6	3	5	4	100
5	(Australia) Bruce McKenzie	7	7	7	8	9	8	9	NC	6				7	6	5				86
6	(Australia) Jason Hore				4	5	4	6	6	8										61
7	(Australia) Richard Peasey							2	3	3										48
8	(Australia) Blake Varney				Ret	4	Ret	5	7	DNS										24
Trophy
1	(Australia) Rielly Brook				7	8	7													44
2	(Australia) Ian Shelby-James							DNQ	DNQ	DNQ	7	6	DNS							24
Pos	Driver	WIN			QLD			MOR			SYD			WAK			BEN			Pts

Colour	Result
Gold	Winner
Silver	Second place
Bronze	Third place
Green	Points classification
Blue	Non-points classification
Blue	Non-classified finish (NC)
Purple	Retired, not classified (Ret)
Red	Did not qualify (DNQ)
Red	Did not pre-qualify (DNPQ)
Black	Disqualified (DSQ)
White	Did not start (DNS)
White	Withdrew (WD)
White	Race cancelled (C)
Blank	Did not practice (DNP)
Blank	Did not arrive (DNA)
Blank	Excluded (EX)
