= 2019 Australian Formula 3 Championship =

Racing series

Seasons
- ← 2018 2021; ~~2020~~ →

The 2019 Australian Formula 3 Championship was an Australian open-wheel racing series for FIA Formula 3 cars constructed and conforming to the regulations before and including 2011. The series began on 10 March 2019 at Winton Motor Raceway and concluded on 3 November 2019 at Queensland Raceway. Organized by Formula Three Management Pty Ltd, it was the 21st consecutive year of Australian Formula 3.

The championship was won by John Magro, winner of all the races.

== Teams and drivers ==
The following teams and drivers contested the 2019 Australian Formula 3 Championship. All teams and drivers are Australian-registered.

Team	Chassis	Engine	No.	Driver	Class	Rounds
R-Tek Motorsport	Dallara F304	Opel-Spiess	5	(Australia) Andrew Roberts	N	1–4
R-Tek Motorsport	Dallara F307	Opel-Spiess	6	(Australia) Roman Krumins	N	1–4
R-Tek Motorsport	Dallara F311	Mercedes	8	(Australia) John Magro	C	1–4
Gilmour Racing	Dallara F311	Mercedes	17	(Australia) Josh Buchan	C	1–4
Gilmour Racing	Dallara F307	Mercedes	37	(Australia) Richard Peasey	C	1–2
Gilmour Racing	Dallara F307	Mercedes	37	(Australia) James Wilkins	C	3
Ruff Racing	Dallara F307	Mercedes	22	(Australia) Gerrit Ruff	N	1–4
Wilson Team Racing	Dallara F311	Volkswagen	27	(Australia) Shane Wilson	C	1–2, 4
BROOK Motorsport	Mygale M07	Mercedes	34	(Australia) Rielly Brook	C	1–4
Shelby-James Motorsport	Dallara F398	Opel-Spiess	75	(Australia) Ian Shelby-James	T	3
Ross McAlpine	Mygale M11	Mercedes	81	(Australia) Ross McAlpine	C	4
99 Motorsport	Dallara F302	Opel-Spiess	99	(Australia) Ryan Astley	N	1–4

Icon	Class
C	Championship
N	National
T	Trophy

=== Classes ===
Competing cars were nominated into one of three classes:

- Championship Class – for automobiles constructed in accordance with the FIA Formula 3 regulations that applied in the year of manufacture between 1 January 2005 and 31 December 2011.
- National Class – for automobiles constructed in accordance with the FIA Formula 3 regulations that applied in the year of manufacture between 1 January 2002 and 31 December 2007.
- Trophy Class.

== Calendar & race results ==
The series was contested over six rounds. All rounds were held in Australia.

Round		Circuit	Date	Premier Class Winner	National Class Winner	Trophy Class Winner
1	1	Winton Motor Raceway	9 March	(Australia) John Magro	(Australia) Roman Krumins	no competitors
1	2	Winton Motor Raceway	10 March	(Australia) John Magro	(Australia) Gerrit Ruff	no competitors
1	3	Winton Motor Raceway	10 March	(Australia) John Magro	(Australia) Gerrit Ruff	no competitors
2	1	Morgan Park Raceway	6 April	(Australia) John Magro	(Australia) Gerrit Ruff	no competitors
2	2	Morgan Park Raceway	7 April	(Australia) John Magro	(Australia) Gerrit Ruff	no competitors
2	3	Morgan Park Raceway	7 April	(Australia) John Magro	(Australia) Roman Krumins	no competitors
3	1	The Bend Motorsport Park	22 June	(Australia) John Magro	(Australia) Roman Krumins	no competitors
3	2	The Bend Motorsport Park	23 June	(Australia) John Magro	(Australia) Roman Krumins	no competitors
3	3	The Bend Motorsport Park	23 June	(Australia) John Magro	(Australia) James Wilkins	no competitors
4	1	Sydney Motorsport Park	28 September	(Australia) John Magro	(Australia) Gerrit Ruff	no competitors
4	2	Sydney Motorsport Park	29 September	(Australia) John Magro	(Australia) Ryan Astley	no competitors
4	3	Sydney Motorsport Park	29 September	(Australia) John Magro	(Australia) Roman Krumins	no competitors
5	1	Wakefield Park	19 October	(Australia) John Magro	(Australia) Ryan Astley	no competitors
5	2	Wakefield Park	20 October	(Australia) John Magro	(Australia) Gerrit Ruff	no competitors
5	3	Wakefield Park	20 October	(Australia) John Magro	(Australia) Roman Krumins	no competitors
6	1	Queensland Raceway	2 November	(Australia) John Magro	(Australia) Gerrit Ruff	no competitors
6	2	Queensland Raceway	3 November	(Australia) John Magro	(Australia) Gerrit Ruff	no competitors
6	3	Queensland Raceway	3 November	(Australia) John Magro	(Australia) Roman Krumins	no competitors

== Standings ==
Points system

Points for are awarded as follows:

Position	1st	2nd	3rd	4th	5th	6th	7th	8th	9th	10th	FL	Pole
Race 1 and 2	12	9	8	7	6	5	4	3	2	1	1	1
Race 3	20	15	12	10	8	6	4	3	2	1	1	1

=== Drivers' championship ===
Pos	Driver	WIN			MOR			BEN			SYD			WAK			QLD			Pts
Championship
1	(Australia) John Magro	1	1	1	1	1	1	1	1	1	1	1	1	1	1	1	1	1	1	286
2	(Australia) Josh Buchan	2	Ret	2	3	3	3	Ret	2	2	2	2	2	2	2	2	2	2	2	177
3	(Australia) Rielly Brook	9	DNS	Ret	Ret	8	4	3	3	3	5	3	Ret	3	3	7	3	3	3	105
4	(Australia) Shane Wilson	5	7	Ret	8	6	Ret				7	5	3	4	7	3	5	5	6	105
5	(Australia) Richard Peasey	3	2	3	2	2	2													62
6	(Australia) Ross McAlpine										8	7	Ret							12
National
1	(Australia) Roman Krumins	4	6	7	5	5	5	2	4	6	4	6	4	Ret	6	4	7	6	4	204
2	(Australia) Gerrit Ruff	6	3	4	4	4	6	DSQ	6	5	3	Ret	6	6	4	5	4	4	Ret	199
3	(Australia) Ryan Astley	7	5	6	6	7	8	5	7	Ret	6	4	5	5	5	6	6	7	5	158
4	(Australia) Andrew Roberts	8	4	5	7	Ret	7	4	Ret	DNS	Ret	Ret	Ret							60
5	(Australia) James Wilkins							6	5	4										38
Trophy
-	(Australia) Ian Shelby-James							DNQ	DNQ	DNQ										-
Pos	Driver	WIN			MOR			BEN			SYD			WAK			QLD			Pts

Colour	Result
Gold	Winner
Silver	Second place
Bronze	Third place
Green	Points classification
Blue	Non-points classification
Blue	Non-classified finish (NC)
Purple	Retired, not classified (Ret)
Red	Did not qualify (DNQ)
Red	Did not pre-qualify (DNPQ)
Black	Disqualified (DSQ)
White	Did not start (DNS)
White	Withdrew (WD)
White	Race cancelled (C)
Blank	Did not practice (DNP)
Blank	Did not arrive (DNA)
Blank	Excluded (EX)
