= Australian Formula 3 =

Australian racing event

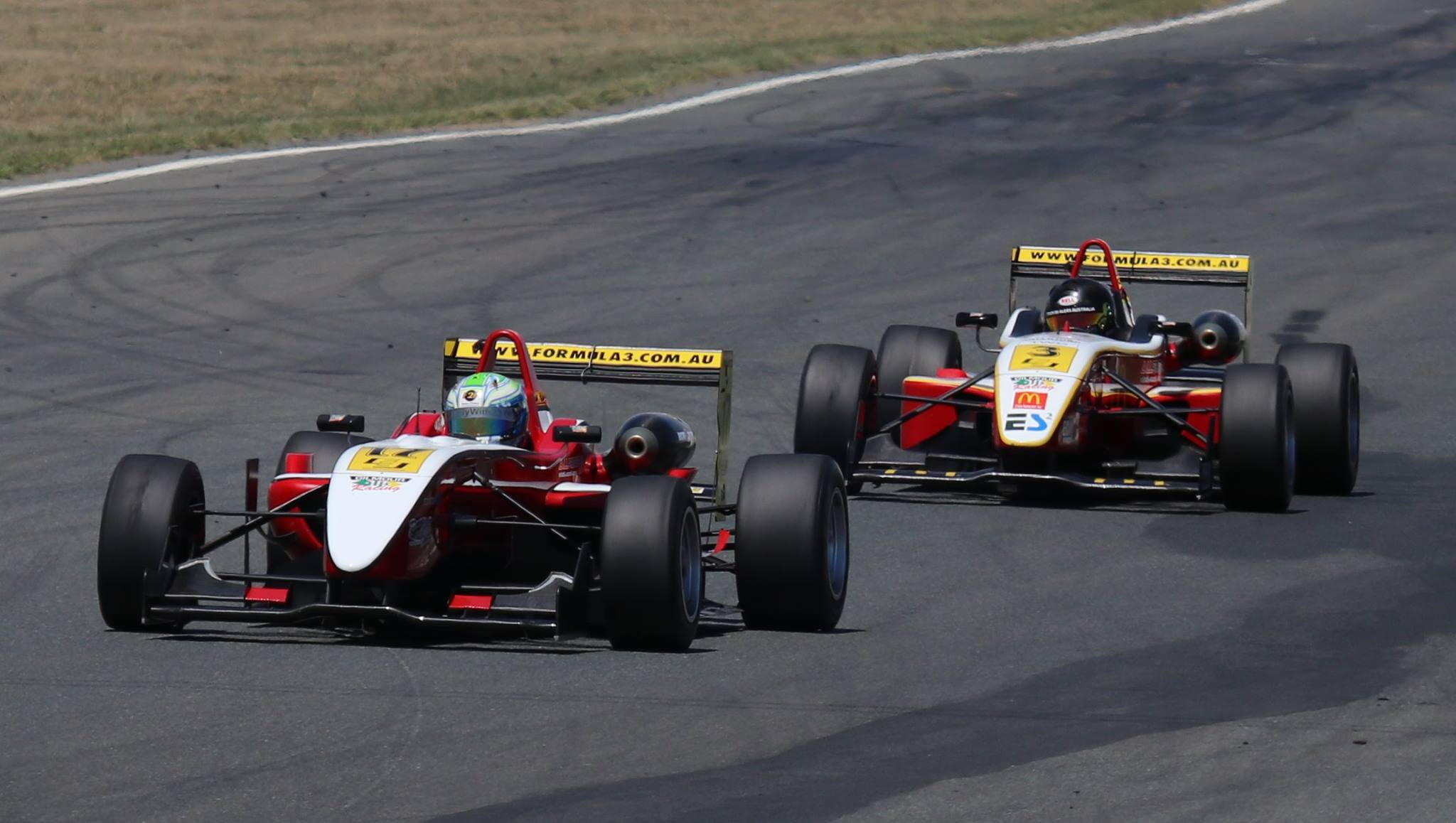
- Category: Open Wheel Racing; Formula 3
- Country: Australia
- Inaugural season: 1964 (first era); 1999 (second era); 2023 (AFO Era)
- Folded: 1977 (first era); 2022 (second era)
- Drivers: 20
- Teams: 18
- Constructors: Dallara; Mygale; Tatuus; Reynard; Stohr; Swift; Mantis; Performer
- Engine suppliers: 2.0 litre Inline 4
- Tyre suppliers: Hankook
- Last Drivers' champion: (Australia) Michael Doherty

Australian Formula 3 has been the name applied to two distinctly different motor racing categories, separated by over twenty years.

The original Australian Formula 3 was introduced in 1964 based on the FIA Formula 3 of the period and intended as a cost-efficient open wheel category to run at state level for amateur racers. It was discontinued at the end of 1977.

Formula 3 was reintroduced to Australia in 1999, again based on FIA Formula 3. An Australian Formula 3 Championship was sanctioned by the Confederation of Australian Motor Sport for the first time in 2001. From 2005 to 2014 the Australian Drivers' Championship title (CAMS Gold Star) was also awarded to the winner of the championship. For 2015 the series reverted to the single title of Australian Formula 3 Championship. Following the withdrawal of national championship status, an Australian Formula 3 Premier Series has been contested since 2016.

== Australian Formula Three (First Era) ==
Australian Formula Three was an Australian open-wheel motor racing category introduced by the Confederation of Australian Motor Sport (CAMS) in 1964. The category was contested until the end of the 1977 season and represented the lowest tier of CAMS-sanctioned formula car racing during that period. Although based on FIA Formula 3 regulations, the Australian category evolved independently and developed significant overlap with Australian Formula Two prior to its discontinuation.

Australian Formula Three was never awarded national championship status, instead being contested through state championships and inter-state series such as the Stillwell Series.

=== Introduction and early regulations (1964–1968) ===
Australian Formula Three was introduced by CAMS in 1964 as a cost-effective entry-level category for amateur drivers, positioned below the Australian National Formula, the Australian 1½ Litre Formula, and Australian Formula Two.

The category was initially based on contemporary FIA Formula 3 regulations. Cars were restricted to production-based engines of up to 1000 cc, with overhead camshaft engines prohibited, effectively limiting powerplants to pushrod designs. The emphasis was on simplicity, reliability, and low operating costs.

Chassis were typically spaceframe designs, often locally constructed or adapted from European Formula 3 designs, and commonly used production-derived components for suspension, braking and transmissions.

=== Regulatory expansion (1969–1971) ===
For the 1969 season, CAMS amended the regulations to increase the maximum engine capacity to 1100 cc and removed the prohibition on overhead camshaft engines. These changes broadened the range of eligible engines and marked the beginning of a steady increase in performance.

During this period, Australian Formula Three cars began to approach the performance of earlier Formula Two machinery, particularly at tighter circuits, while remaining production-based in concept.

=== 1300 cc era and peak participation (1972–1977) ===
From 1972, the engine capacity limit for Australian Formula Three was increased to 1300 cc. Engines were required to remain production-based, using pushrod or single overhead camshaft valve actuation, with carburetion mandatory.

By the mid-1970s, the Toyota Corolla engine had become the most popular Formula Three powerplant, producing approximately 135 bhp at 8,000 rpm. With minimum weights of around 350 kg, the fastest Formula Three cars were capable of lap times competitive with slower Australian Formula Two cars, which typically weighed around 400 kg and produced 200–210 bhp from 1600 cc engines.

Despite lacking national championship status, Formula Three enjoyed strong participation and regular racing in Victoria, New South Wales, and South Australia, with prominent series including the Stillwell Series providing inter-state competition.

The category was dominated in the mid-1970s by Brian Sampson and Brian Shead, whose Cheetah chassis became the most successful and widely used Formula Three car in Australia. Other leading competitors during 1976 and 1977 included Gary Scott, Peter Macrow, and Terry Finnigan, all driving Cheetahs.

=== Decline and discontinuation ===
By the mid-1970s, Australian Formula Two participation had declined significantly, and by 1977 there was no longer a national Formula Two series. In contrast, Formula Three continued to attract healthy grids and frequent competition.

At the end of the 1977 season, CAMS elected to discontinue Australian Formula Three as part of a broader rationalisation of formula racing categories. For 1978, Australian Formula Two regulations were substantially revised to incorporate many of the technical characteristics of the former Formula Three category, including production-based engines of up to 1.6 litres, carburetion, and restrictions on valve actuation.

The revised Formula Two cars were visually and mechanically similar to the final generation of Australian Formula Three machinery, effectively merging the two categories.

== History – The Second Era ==
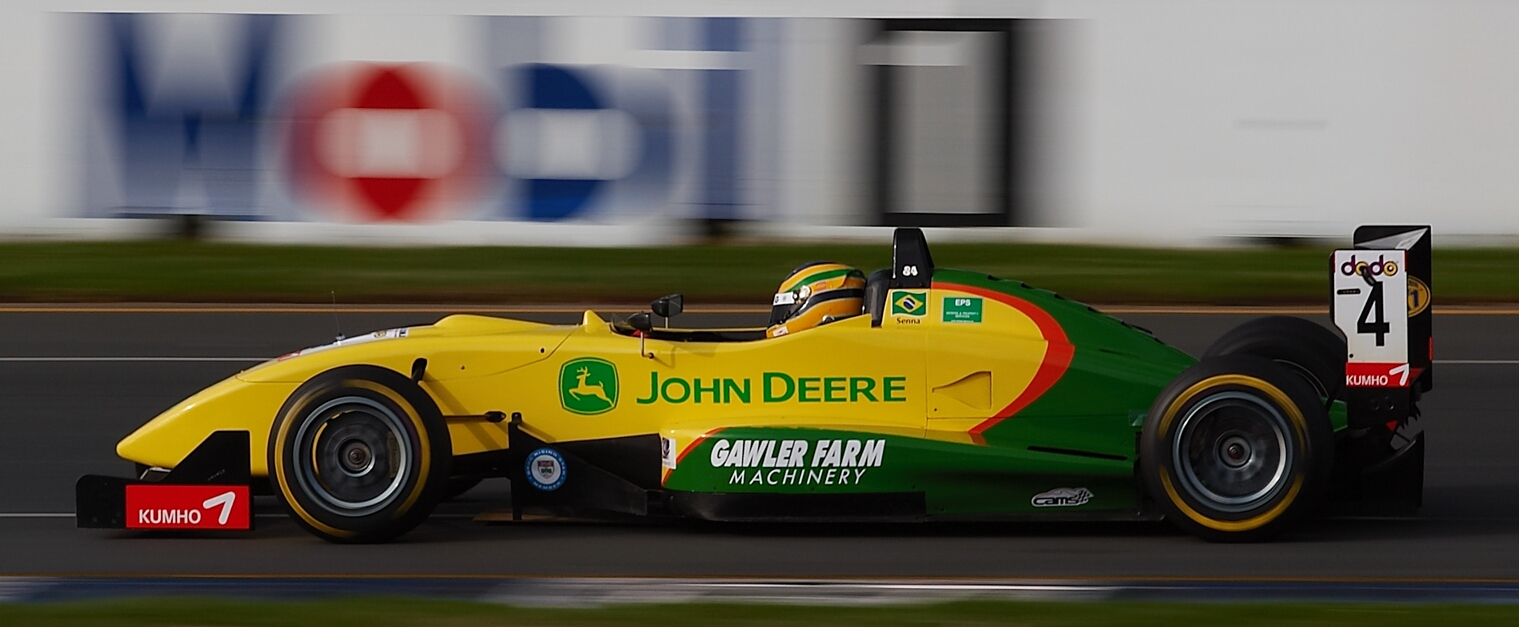
Bruno Senna drives a Dallara F304 F3 car during a support race at the 2006 Australian GP

The modern era began when 2 Litre Formula 3 cars were introduced into Australia in 1999, competing alongside 1600cc Australian Formula 2 cars in the Australian Formula 2 National Series. In the following year CAMS introduced FIA specifications for Formula 3 cars in Australia and Formula 3 drivers now had their own Formula 3 National Series. Agreement was reached with CAMS to grant National Championship status to the Formula 3 Series for 2001 and it officially became the Australian Formula 3 Championship in that year. By the 2005 season CAMS had decreed that Australian Formula 3 was now Australia's premier open-wheel racing car class (displacing Formula 4000) and as such the Australian Drivers' Championship title (and the associated CAMS Gold Star) would be awarded on the results of the Australian Formula 3 Championship.

== History – Australian Formula Open Series era ==
Australia Formula Open (AFO) is a racing series that allows a wide range of single-seater cars to compete — primarily Formula 3 cars from various years and manufacturers, as well as similar types like Formula 1000. With its open technical regulations, AFO offers flexible and accessible entry conditions, making it an attractive platform for developing drivers.

== List of Champions ==
Following the running of a National Series in 1999 and 2000, official national title status was granted by the Confederation of Australian Motorsport from 2001 onwards. From 2005 to 2014 the winner of the Australian Formula 3 Championship was also awarded the CAMS Gold Star and the Australian Drivers' Championship title. In 2015 CAMS stripped the Gold Star Award from the Australian Formula 3 Championship citing low grid numbers. With the loss of national championship status for 2016 the series was renamed the Australian Formula 3 Premier Series. Aligning with the Australian Motor Racing Series from 2019 the series returned to National Championship status.

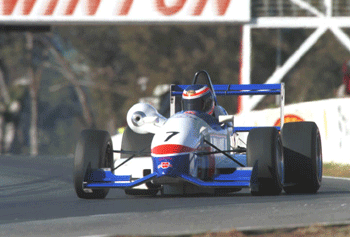
Paul Stephenson 1999 Australian F3 National Series Champion

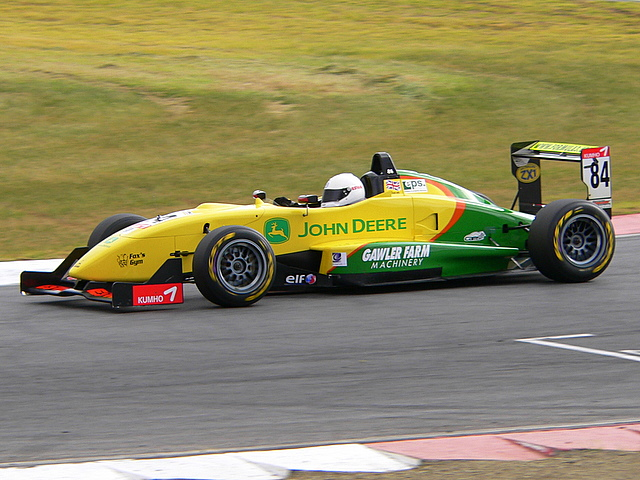
Ben Clucas (Dallara F304), winner of the 2006 championship

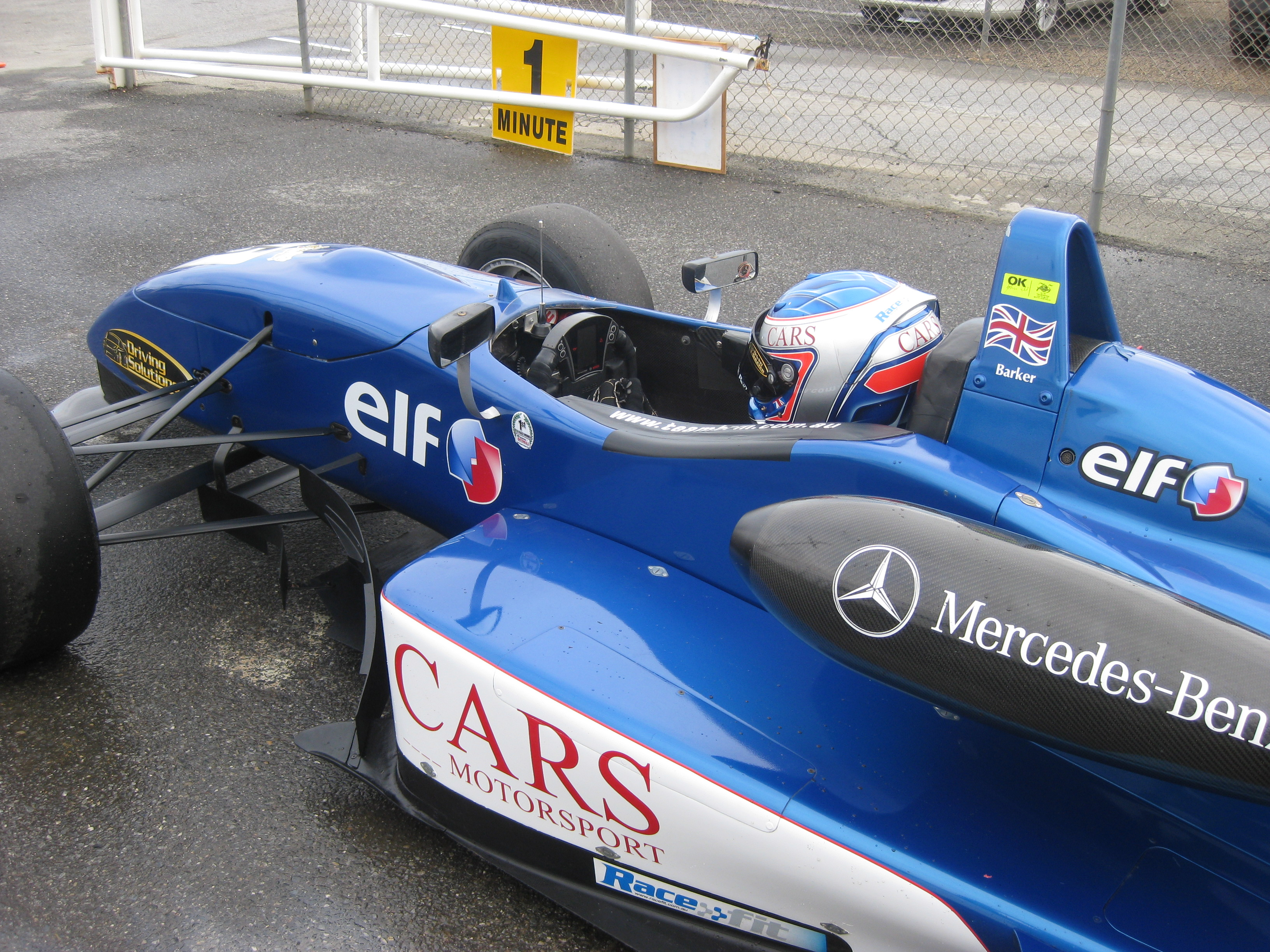
Ben Barker (Dallara F307), winner of the 2010 championship.

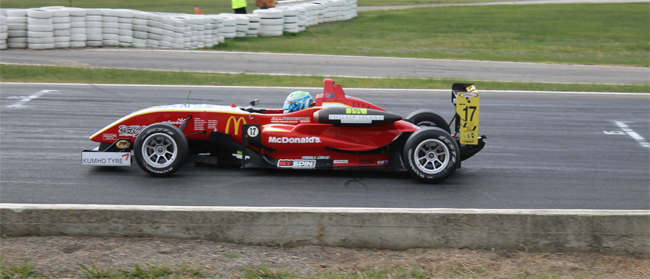
Jon Collins (Dallara F311), winner of the 2015 championship

=== Australian Formula 3 National Series ===
Season	Series Winner	Vehicle	Team
1999	(Australia) Paul Stephenson	Dallara F396 – TOM'S Toyota	Titan
2000	(Australia) Paul Stephenson	Dallara F396 – TOM'S Toyota	Titan

=== Australian Formula 3 Championship ===
Season	Champion	Vehicle	Team
2001	(Australia) Peter Hackett	Dallara F301 – Alfa Romeo	Piccola Scuderia
2002	(Australia) James Manderson	Dallara F301 – Spiess Opel	Team BRM
2003	(Australia) Michael Caruso	Dallara F301 – Novamotor Fiat	Piccola Scuderia
2004	(Australia) Karl Reindler	Dallara F301 – Spiess Opel	Team BRM

=== Australian Formula 3 Championship / Australian Drivers' Championship ===
Season	Champion	Vehicle	Team
2005	(Australia) Aaron Caratti	Dallara F304 – Sodemo Renault	Insight F3
2006	(United Kingdom) Ben Clucas	Dallara F304 – Sodemo Renault	Team BRM
2007	(Australia) Tim Macrow	Dallara F304 – Spiess Opel	Cooltemp Racing/Scud Racing
2008	(United Kingdom) James Winslow	Dallara F307 – HWA-Mercedes-Benz	Astuti Motorsport/Team BRM
2009	(United Kingdom) Joey Foster	Dallara F307 – HWA-Mercedes-Benz	Team BRM
2010	(United Kingdom) Ben Barker	Dallara F307 – HWA-Mercedes-Benz	Team BRM
2011	(Australia) Chris Gilmour	Dallara F307 – HWA-Mercedes-Benz	Gilmour Racing
2012	(United Kingdom) James Winslow	Dallara F307 – HWA-Mercedes-Benz	R-Tek Motorsport
2013	(Australia) Tim Macrow	Dallara F307 – HWA-Mercedes-Benz	Team BRM
2014	(Australia) Simon Hodge	Mygale M11 – HWA-Mercedes-Benz	Team BRM

=== Australian Formula 3 Championship ===
The Australian Formula 3 Championship was renamed the Australian Formula 3 Premier Series by Formula 3 Management Pty Ltd from 2016 to 2018, returning to Australian Formula 3 Championship from 2019.

Season	Champion	Vehicle	Team
2015	(Australia) John Collins	Dallara F311 – Mercedes-Benz	Gilmour Racing
2016	(Australia) Tim Macrow	Dallara F307 – Mercedes-Benz	Alpine Motorsport
2017	(Australia) Calan Williams	Dallara F311 – Mercedes-Benz	Gilmour Racing
2018	(Australia) Harri Jones	Dallara F311 – Mercedes-Benz	Jones Motorsport
2019	(Australia) John Magro	Dallara F311 – Mercedes-Benz	R-Tek Motorsport
2020	Not held due to COVID-19 pandemic restrictions		
2021	Not awarded. Only one round held due to COVID-19 pandemic		
2022	(Australia) Noah Sands	Dallara F311 – Mercedes-Benz	Gilmour Racing

=== Australian Formula Open Championship ===
Australian Formula 3 Premier Series was renamed the Australian Formula Open Championship to get in line with the Euroformula Open Championship running not just Formula 3 cars, but other classes.

Season	Champion	Vehicle	Team
2023	(Australia) Trent Grubel	Dallara F312 – Mercedes-Benz	Tim Macrow Racing
2024	(Australia) Ryan MacMillan	Dallara F308/11	Tim Macrow Racing
2025	(Australia) Michael Doherty	Performer P1000	Performer Australia

== List of constructors in Australian Formula 3 ==
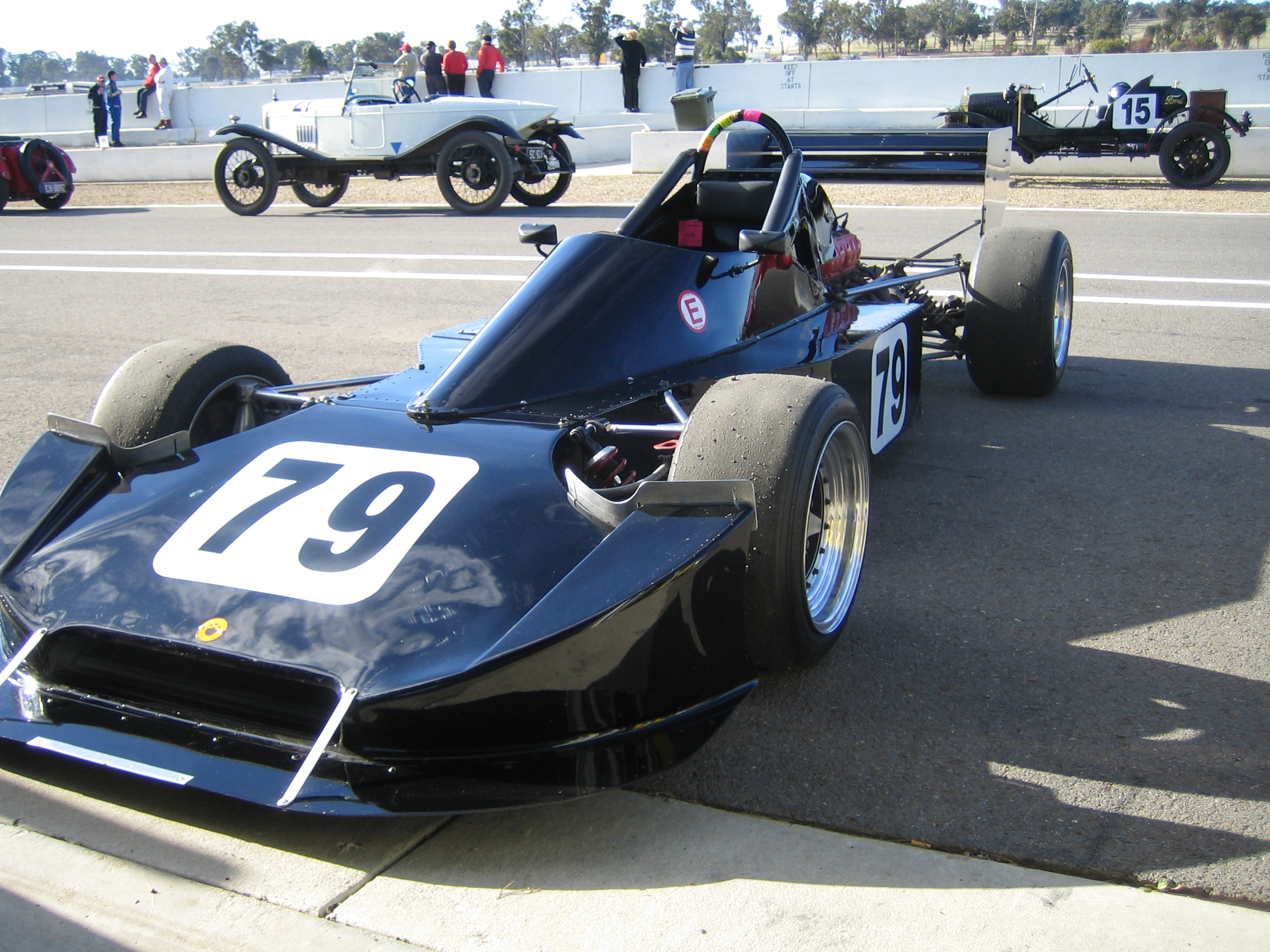
AF3 Cheetah Mk6

Cars built by the following constructors have raced in Australian Formula 3

=== Historic Era ===
- Aztec
- Birrana
- Elfin
- Cheetah
- Alpha Sports Productions ASP

=== Modern Era ===
- Dallara
- Mygale
- Reynard

== See also ==
- Australian Formula Junior Championship - 1962-1963
- Formula Regional Australia - 2025-Current
