= 2015 Australian Formula 3 Championship =

Motor racing competition

The 2015 Australian Formula 3 Championship was an Australian motor racing competition for cars constructed in accordance with FIA Formula 3 regulations. It was sanctioned by the Confederation of Australian Motor Sport (CAMS) as a national championship, with Formula 3 Management Pty Ltd appointed as the Category Manager. The Championship began on 27 March at Sandown Raceway and ended on 18 October at Wakefield Park after seven rounds across three states. The title, which was the 15th Australian Formula 3 Championship, was won by Gilmour Racing's Jon Collins by 1 point over Ricky Capo after both were excluded from the final race of the year.

CAMS removed the Gold Star award from the Australian Formula 3 Championship for 2015. The move ended a 58-year tradition, the award being the third oldest continually awarded CAMS title after the Australian Grand Prix and Australian Hillclimb Championship.

== Teams and drivers ==
The following teams and drivers contested the 2015 Australian Formula 3 Championship. All teams and drivers were Australian-registered.

Team	Chassis	Engine	No.	Driver	Class	Rounds
Bob Johns Racing/Gilmour Racing	Dallara F311	Volkswagen	3	Chris Gilmour	C	5
R-Tek Motorsport	Dallara F311	HWA-Mercedes-Benz	8	Roland Legge	C	4-7
R-Tek Motorsport	Dallara F307	HWA-Mercedes-Benz	6	Roland Legge	C	1
R-Tek Motorsport	Dallara F307	HWA-Mercedes-Benz	6	Dennie Rumble	N	2,4
R-Tek Motorsport	Dallara F307	HWA-Mercedes-Benz	6	Roman Krumins	N	5
R-Tek Motorsport	Dallara F307	Spiess-Opel	7	Nathan Kumar	N	All
R-Tek Motorsport	Dallara F304	Spiess-Opel	9	Andrew Roberts	K	1
R-Tek Motorsport	Dallara F304	Spiess-Opel	9	Keegan Brain	K	5
Wiltec Industries	Dallara F304	Spiess-Opel	13	Shane Wilson	K	4-5,7
Trent Shirvington	Mygale M11	HWA-Mercedes-Benz	14	Trent Shirvington	C	All
Gilmour Racing	Dallara F311	HWA-Mercedes-Benz	17	Jon Collins	C	All
Gilmour Racing	Dallara F307	HWA-Mercedes-Benz	23	Luke Spalding	N	1-5
Harvest Motorsport	Mygale M11	HWA-Mercedes-Benz	46	Shane Ryding	C	1-3,5,7
Ross McAlpine	Dallara F304	Renault-Sodemo	81	Ross McAlpine	K	4,7
Ellery Motorsport Enterprises	Dallara F311	HWA-Mercedes-Benz	83	Luke Ellery	C	4
Alpine Motorsport	Dallara F307	HWA-Mercedes-Benz	88	Tim Macrow	C	6
Alpine Motorsport	Dallara F307	HWA-Mercedes-Benz	88	Dennie Rumble	N	7
Paul Scott	Dallara F304	Renault-Sodemo	89	Paul Scott	K	5
Paul Scott	Dallara F304	Renault-Sodemo	89	Paul Scott	N	6
Wlodek Racing	Dallara F307	Mugen-Honda	91	Andrew Wlodek	N	4,7
Ricky Capo Racing	Dallara F311	Mugen-Honda	92	Ricky Capo	C	All

Icon	Class
C	Championship
N	National Class
K	Kumho Class

== Classes ==
Competing cars were nominated into one of four classes:

- Australian Formula 3 Championship – for automobiles constructed in accordance with the FIA Formula 3 regulations that applied in the year of manufacture between 1 January 2005 and 31 December 2011.
- National Class – for automobiles constructed in accordance with the FIA Formula 3 regulations that applied in the year of manufacture between 1 January 1999 and 31 December 2007.
- Kumho Cup Class – for automobiles constructed in accordance with the FIA Formula 3 regulations that applied in the year of manufacture between 1 January 1999 and 31 December 2004.
- Invitational Class.

== Points system ==
Championship points were awarded in each class as follows:

- One point to the driver placed in the highest grid position in each class for the first race at each round.
- 12–9–8–7–6–5–4–3–2–1 for the first ten finishing positions in each class in each of the first two races at each round.
- 20–15–12–10–8–6–4–3–2–1 basis for the first ten finishing positions in each class in the third race at each round and in the fourth race at the Wakfield Park round.
- One point to the driver that achieved the fastest lap time in each class in each race of the championship.

== Race calendar ==
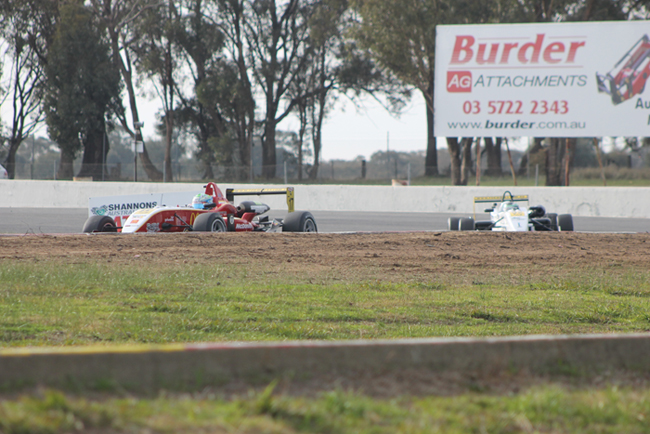
Jon Collins & Ricky Capo at Winton in 2015

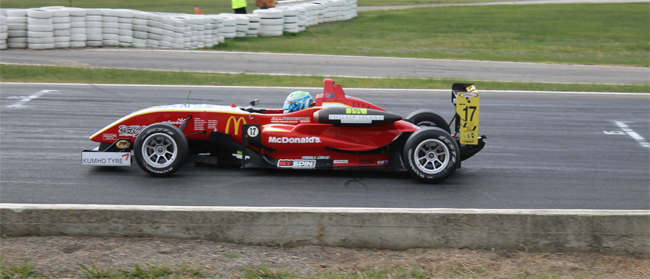
Jon Collins won the championship driving a Dallara F311 (2011/Latest Spec Chassis) Mercedes-Benz

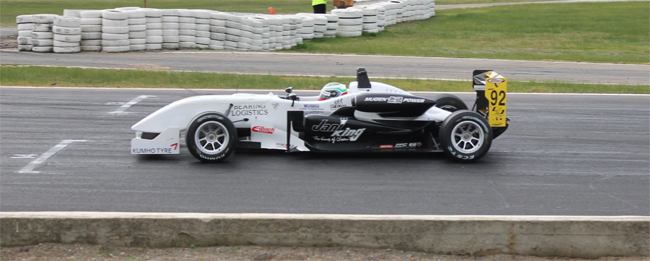
Ricky Capo placed second driving a Dallara F311 (2011/Latest Spec Chassis) Mugen-Honda

The Championship was contested over a seven-round series. All races were held in Australia.

Round	Circuit	Date	Format	Championship Class winner	National Class winner	Kumho Cup winner
1	Sandown Raceway	27–29 March	Three races	Ricky Capo	Luke Spalding	Andrew Roberts
2	Phillip Island Grand Prix Circuit	22–24 May	Three races	Jon Collins	Luke Spalding	not present
3	Winton Motor Raceway	12–14 June	Three races	Jon Collins	Luke Spalding	not present
4	Sydney Motorsport Park	3–5 July	Three races	Jon Collins	Luke Spalding	Shane Wilson
5	Queensland Raceway	7–9 August	Three races	Jon Collins	Luke Spalding	Paul Scott
6	Phillip Island Grand Prix Circuit	18–20 September	Three races	Tim Macrow	Paul Scott	not present
7	Wakefield Park	16–18 October	Four races	Trent Shirvington	Andrew Wlodek	Ross McAlpine

Note:

- Mount Panorama was removed from the calendar after being included for the last three years.
- Hidden Valley was removed from the calendar after being included for the last four years
- The results for each round of the Championship were determined by the results of the final race of the round.
- The Kumho Cup was contested only at Rounds 1,4,5 and 7.

== Championship Standings ==
	Championship Class			
Position	Driver	Car.	Competitor / Team	Points
1	Jon Collins	Dallara F311 Mercedes-Benz	Gilmour Racing	257
2	Ricky Capo	Dallara F311 Mugen-Honda	Modena Engineering	256
3	Trent Shirvington	Mygale M11 Mercedes-Benz	Trent Shirvington	163
4	Roland Legge	Dallara F307 Mercedes-Benz; Dallara F311 Mercedes-Benz	R-Tek Motorsport	135
5	Shane Ryding	Mygale M11 Mercedes-Benz	Harvest Motorsport	97
6	Tim Macrow	Dallara F307 Mercedes-Benz	Alpine Motorsport	48
7	Chris Gilmour	Dallara F311 Volkswagen	Bobby Johns Racing/Gilmour Racing	24
8	Luke Ellery	Dallara F311 Mercedes-Benz	Ellery Motorsport Enterprises	18
	National Class			
Position	Driver	Car	Competitor / Team	Points
1	Luke Spalding	Dallara F307 Mercedes-Benz	Gilmour Racing	231
2	Nathan Kumar	Dallara F307 Spiess-Opel	R-Tek Motorsport	115
3	Dennie Rumble	Dallara F307 Mercedes-Benz	R-Tek Motorsport	100
4	Andrew Wlodek	Dallara F307 Mugen-Honda	Wlodek Racing	62
5	Paul Scott	Dallara F304 Renault-Sodemo	Paul Scott	38
6	Roman Krumins	Dallara F307 Mercedes-Benz	R-Tek Motorsport	36
	Kumho Cup			
Position	Driver	Car	Competitor / Team	Points
1	Shane Wilson	Dallara F304 Spiess-Opel	Wiltec Industries	127
2	Ross McAlpine	Dallara F304 Renault-Sodemo	Ross McAlpine	89
3	Andrew Roberts	Dallara F304 Spiess-Opel	R-Tek Motorsport	48
3	Paul Scott	Dallara F304 Renault-Sodemo	Paul Scott	48
5	Keegan Brain	Dallara F304 Spiess-Opel	R-Tek Motorsport	20

== See also ==
- Australian Drivers' Championship
- Australian Formula 3
