= 2025 Australian Formula Open =

Australian formula racing championship

The 2025 Australian Formula Open: Driven by FRCA was a multi-event open-wheel single seater motor racing championship. This was the third season of the Australian Formula Open series, which was originally founded by two-time Australian Gold Star winner Tim Macrow in 2023 as a direct successor to the Australian Formula 3 championship.

When AFO's original organizers launched the AU3 Championship for 2025, the AFO moniker was taken over mid-year by the organizers of the NSW Formula Car Championship, an open formula championship run since 2011 as one of Motorsport Australia's State Championships. That saw that championship effectively be rebranded under the AFO guise.

The championship was run over five weekends from February to October. Performer Australia's Michael Doherty won the Drivers' Championship title at the penultimate race of the season.

== Teams and drivers ==
All teams and drivers were Australian-registered.

Team	No.	Driver	Car	Rounds
Baker Motorsport - Team Penrite	1	Rodney Baker	Dallara F399	All
RMS Racing	3	Robert Sviderskas	Mantis M2-001	All
Genesis Offices	4	Robert Rowe	Dallara F308	4
TWS Motorsport	14	Trent Shirvington	Mygale M11	1
M Roesler Motorsport	14	Matthew Roesler	Tatuus FT-50	4
CO Machining	21	Graeme Holmes	Dallara F3	2–5
Sydney Photo Booth / AGI Sport	23	Lawrence Katsidis	Dallara F304	All
Apollo Patios	24	Nathan Beer	Dallara F305/7	1–3, 5
Phil Morrow Racing	25	Phil Morrow	Dallara F305/7	1, 3, 5
CPL	37	Ben Turner	Dallara F3	4
Formula Race Car Association	41	Greg Muddle	Dallara F305	1–4
Performer Australia	42	Michael Doherty	Performer P1000	All
Performer Australia	72	Shane Varley	Performer P1000	1–2, 4–5
Douglas Barry Specials	44	Douglas Barry	Reynard 92D	1–4
ARB Bundaberg	51	Ron Bennet	Dallara F399/01	4
Eagle Transportation Pty Ltd	55	Glenn Lynch	Dallara F397	1, 3
3 Amigos Racing	76	Jeffrey Senior	Dallara F302	3–4
SMJ Plastering	95	Shayne Morrow	Dallara F300/01	1, 5
Raven Gruppe	666	Adam Savic	Stohr F1000	All
Privateer	73	Simon Bedford	Dallara F3	4–5
Privateer	88	Andrew Fitzpatrick	Mygale M14-F4	1
Privateer	655	Abhishek Jain	Swift 2015	2

== Race calendar ==
The 2025 calendar was announced in early January 2024 - still under the guise of the NSW Formula Car Challenge. Compared to 2024, two events at One Raceway were added while Sydney Motorsport Park only hosted two instead of three rounds. A sixth event at Morgan Park Raceway was also part of the first version of the calendar, but was later removed.

Round		Circuit	Date	Support bill	Map of circuit locations
1	R1	(New South Wales) One Raceway, Goulburn	22 February	NSW Production Touring Cars; NSW Improved Production Championship; New South Wales Formula Ford Championship	2025 Australian Formula Open is located in Australia
1	R2	(New South Wales) One Raceway, Goulburn	23 February	NSW Production Touring Cars; NSW Improved Production Championship; New South Wales Formula Ford Championship	2025 Australian Formula Open is located in Australia
1	R3	(New South Wales) One Raceway, Goulburn	23 February	NSW Production Touring Cars; NSW Improved Production Championship; New South Wales Formula Ford Championship	2025 Australian Formula Open is located in Australia
2	R1	(Victoria (state)) Winton Motor Raceway, Winton	10 May	NSW Production Touring Cars; NSW Improved Production Championship; Victorian Improved Production Championship; New South Wales Formula Ford Championship	2025 Australian Formula Open is located in Australia
2	R2	(Victoria (state)) Winton Motor Raceway, Winton	11 May	NSW Production Touring Cars; NSW Improved Production Championship; Victorian Improved Production Championship; New South Wales Formula Ford Championship	2025 Australian Formula Open is located in Australia
2	R3	(Victoria (state)) Winton Motor Raceway, Winton	11 May	NSW Production Touring Cars; NSW Improved Production Championship; Victorian Improved Production Championship; New South Wales Formula Ford Championship	2025 Australian Formula Open is located in Australia
3	R1	(New South Wales) Sydney Motorsport Park, Eastern Creek	26 July	Australian Formula Ford Championship; NSW Production Touring Cars; NSW Improved Production Championship; SuperSports NSW State Championship	2025 Australian Formula Open is located in Australia
3	R2	(New South Wales) Sydney Motorsport Park, Eastern Creek	26 July	Australian Formula Ford Championship; NSW Production Touring Cars; NSW Improved Production Championship; SuperSports NSW State Championship	2025 Australian Formula Open is located in Australia
3	R3	(New South Wales) Sydney Motorsport Park, Eastern Creek	26 July	Australian Formula Ford Championship; NSW Production Touring Cars; NSW Improved Production Championship; SuperSports NSW State Championship	2025 Australian Formula Open is located in Australia
4	R1	(New South Wales) Sydney Motorsport Park, Eastern Creek	27 September	NSW Production Touring Cars; NSW Improved Production Championship; SuperSports NSW State Championship; NSW Sports Sedan State Championship	2025 Australian Formula Open is located in Australia
4	R2	(New South Wales) Sydney Motorsport Park, Eastern Creek	28 September	NSW Production Touring Cars; NSW Improved Production Championship; SuperSports NSW State Championship; NSW Sports Sedan State Championship	2025 Australian Formula Open is located in Australia
4	R3	(New South Wales) Sydney Motorsport Park, Eastern Creek	28 September	NSW Production Touring Cars; NSW Improved Production Championship; SuperSports NSW State Championship; NSW Sports Sedan State Championship	2025 Australian Formula Open is located in Australia
5	R1	(New South Wales) One Raceway, Goulburn	18 October	NSW Sports Sedan State Championship; SuperSports NSW State Championship; New South Wales Formula Ford Championship	2025 Australian Formula Open is located in Australia
5	R2	(New South Wales) One Raceway, Goulburn	19 October	NSW Sports Sedan State Championship; SuperSports NSW State Championship; New South Wales Formula Ford Championship	2025 Australian Formula Open is located in Australia
5	R3	(New South Wales) One Raceway, Goulburn	19 October	NSW Sports Sedan State Championship; SuperSports NSW State Championship; New South Wales Formula Ford Championship	2025 Australian Formula Open is located in Australia

== Race results ==
Round		Circuit	Pole position	Fastest lap	Winning driver	Winning team
1	R1	(New South Wales) One Raceway	Trent Shirvington	Trent Shirvington	Trent Shirvington	TWS Motorsport
1	R2	(New South Wales) One Raceway		Trent Shirvington	Trent Shirvington	TWS Motorsport
1	R3	(New South Wales) One Raceway		Rodney Baker	Rodney Baker	Baker Motorsport - Team Penrite
2	R1	(Victoria (state)) Winton Motor Raceway	Michael Doherty	Rodney Baker	Rodney Baker	Baker Motorsport - Team Penrite
2	R2	(Victoria (state)) Winton Motor Raceway		Michael Doherty	Michael Doherty	Performer Australia
2	R3	(Victoria (state)) Winton Motor Raceway		Michael Doherty	Michael Doherty	Performer Australia
3	R1	(New South Wales) Sydney Motorsport Park	Douglas Barry	Michael Doherty	Michael Doherty	Performer Australia
3	R2	(New South Wales) Sydney Motorsport Park		Michael Doherty	Michael Doherty	Performer Australia
3	R3	(New South Wales) Sydney Motorsport Park		race cancelled after delays to race weekend schedule		
4	R1	(New South Wales) Sydney Motorsport Park	Rodney Baker	Douglas Barry	Michael Doherty	Performer Australia
4	R2	(New South Wales) Sydney Motorsport Park		Rodney Baker	Rodney Baker	Baker Motorsport - Team Penrite
4	R3	(New South Wales) Sydney Motorsport Park		Robert Rowe	Douglas Barry	Douglas Barry Specials
5	R1	(New South Wales) One Raceway	Rodney Baker	Rodney Baker	Michael Doherty	Performer Australia
5	R2	(New South Wales) One Raceway		Rodney Baker	Rodney Baker	Baker Motorsport - Team Penrite
5	R3	(New South Wales) One Raceway		Graeme Holmes	Graeme Holmes	CO Machining

== Championship standings ==
Points were awarded as follows:

Position	1st	2nd	3rd	4th	5th	6th	7th	8th	9th	10th
Points	25	18	15	12	10	8	6	4	2	1

Pos	Driver	ONE1 (New South Wales)			WIN (Victoria (state))			SYD1 (New South Wales)			SYD2 (New South Wales)			ONE2 (New South Wales)			Pts
Pos	Driver	R1	R2	R3	R1	R2	R3	R1	R2	R3	R1	R2	R3	R1	R2	R3	Pts
1	Michael Doherty	6	5	4	**2**	1	1	1	1	C	1	2	3	1	3	6	254
2	Rodney Baker	5	2	1	1	Ret	2	4	3	C	**4**	1	2	**2**	1	Ret	221
3	Lawrence Katsidis	3	3	6	4	4	4	6	4	C	Ret	9	8	Ret	5	2	128
4	Graeme Holmes				WD	WD	WD	2	2	C	Ret	6	9	4	2	1	101
5	Shane Varley	10	8	10	Ret	2	3				9	5	4	3	4	5	100
6	Adam Savic	9	10	11	3	3	Ret	8	7	C	8	10	7	Ret	8	4	70
7	Nathan Beer	2	6	7	WD	WD	WD	DNS	9	C				Ret	6	3	57
8	Douglas Barry	DNS	Ret	5	WD	WD	WD	**7**	DNS	C	Ret	3	1				56
9	Trent Shirvington	**1**	1	Ret													50
10	Jeffrey Senior							3	5	C	7	7	5				47
11	Andrew Fitzpatrick	4	4	2													42
12	Greg Muddle	11	Ret	3	DNS	Ret	WD	9	8	C	3	WD	WD				36
13	Glenn Lynch	7	7	8				5	6	C							34
14	Robert Sviderskas	Ret	DNS	DNS	DNS	5	5	10	Ret	C	Ret	12	Ret	8	Ret	WD	25
15	Ron Bennet										5	4	Ret				22
16	Simon Bedford										10	11	10	6	7	7	22
17	Matthew Roesler										6	8	6				20
18	Robert Rowe										2	Ret	Ret				18
19	Shayne Morrow	8	9	9										5	Ret	Ret	18
20	Phil Morrow	Ret	Ret	DNS				Ret	DNS	C				7	9	Ret	8
—	Abhishek Jain				WD	WD	WD										0
—	Ben Turner										WD	WD	WD				0
Pos	Driver	R1	R2	R3	R1	R2	R3	R1	R2	R3	R1	R2	R3	R1	R2	R3	Pts
Pos	Driver	ONE1 (New South Wales)			WIN (Victoria (state))			SYD1 (New South Wales)			SYD2 (New South Wales)			ONE2 (New South Wales)			Pts

Colour	Result
Gold	Winner
Silver	Second place
Bronze	Third place
Green	Points classification
Blue	Non-points classification
Blue	Non-classified finish (NC)
Purple	Retired, not classified (Ret)
Red	Did not qualify (DNQ)
Red	Did not pre-qualify (DNPQ)
Black	Disqualified (DSQ)
White	Did not start (DNS)
White	Withdrew (WD)
White	Race cancelled (C)
Blank	Did not practice (DNP)
Blank	Did not arrive (DNA)
Blank	Excluded (EX)

**Bold** – Pole

Italics – Fastest Lap

† — Did not finish, but classified
