= 2023 Australian Formula Open Series =

Multi-event open-wheel single seater motor racing championship

The 2023 Australian Formula Open - powered by Racefuels was a multi-event open-wheel single seater motor racing championship. This was the inaugural season of the championship, founded by two-time Australian Gold Star winner Tim Macrow as a direct successor to the Australian Formula 3 championship.

Drivers competed to win a S5000 test and free entry to a race in the S5000 Championship in 2024 or later.

Trent Grubel, driving for Tim Macrow Racing, won the overall championship and with it the AFO1 class championship, three points ahead of his teammate Ryan How. Matthew Roesler, driving for his privateer State Fleet Services team, won the AFO2 class championship, while AGI Sport's Kristian Janev was victorious in the AFO4 class.

== Teams and drivers ==
The championship was structured in four classes, albeit only three classes received entries through the season. AFO1 encompassed all Formula 3 machinery, with several chassis and engine manufacturers represented. AFO2 catered to Toyota Racing Series, Formula Renault and older F3 cars. AFO3 served all other invitational entries, but did not receive any entries, while AFO4 was reserved for Formula 4 cars.

=== AFO1 entries ===
Team	No.	Car	Driver	Rounds
Gilmour Racing	1	Dallara F308/11 Mercedes-Benz	(Australia) Daniel Price	1
Gilmour Racing	1	Dallara F308/11 Mercedes-Benz	(Australia) Jon Collins	2, 4–5
Gilmour Racing	1	Dallara F308/11 Mercedes-Benz	(Australia) Kyle Evans	6
Gilmour Racing	17	Dallara F307	(Australia) Chris Gilmour	4–5
R-Tek Motorsport Services	2	Dallara F307 Opel	(Australia) Andrew Roberts	1–3, 6
Genesis Offices	4	Dallara F308	(Australia) Robert Rowe	6
Sydney Photo Booth	5	Dallara F304 Renault	(Australia) Lawrence Katsidis	6
Sydney Photo Booth	23	Dallara F304 Renault	(Australia) Lawrence Katsidis	1–2
Tim Macrow Racing	8	Dallara F308/11	(Australia) Miles Bromley	2–4
Tim Macrow Racing	9	Dallara F308/11	(Australia) Miles Bromley	5–6
Tim Macrow Racing	22	Dallara F308/11 Mercedes-Benz	(Australia) Beau Russell	5–6
Tim Macrow Racing	22	Dallara F308/11 Mercedes-Benz	(Australia) Winston Van Laarhoven	1, 3–4
Tim Macrow Racing	24	Dallara F308/11 Mercedes-Benz	(Australia) Winston Van Laarhoven	2
Tim Macrow Racing	27	Dallara F308/11 Mercedes-Benz	(Australia) Ryan How	All
Tim Macrow Racing	74	Dallara F312 Mercedes-Benz	(Australia) Trent Grubel	All
Ruff Racing	9	Mygale M11	(Australia) Gerrit Ruff	2
Ruff Racing	11	Mygale M11	(Australia) Gerrit Ruff	6
TWS Motorsport	14	Mygale M11	(Australia) Trent Shirvington	2–3, 5
Formula Race Car Association	17	Dallara F397 Volkswagen	(Australia) Shayne Morrow	1–2, 6
Formula Race Car Association	41	Dallara F307 Opel	(Australia) Greg Muddle	1–2
Formula Race Car Association	48	Dallara F3	(Australia) Ron Coath	2
Formula Race Car Association	55	Dallara F397	(Australia) Glenn Lynch	1–2
CO Machining	21	Dallara F304 Opel	(Australia) Graeme Holmes	1–2
Baker Motorsport / Team Penrite	22	Dallara F399	(Australia) Rodney Baker	2, 6
CPL	37	Dallara F3	(Australia) Ben Turner	2
Team Rod Anderson	38	Reynard 893 Toyota	(Australia) Rod Anderson	1–2
Douglas Barry Specials	56	Reynard 92D Holden	(Australia) Douglas Barry	1–2, 6
99 Motorsport	99	Dallara F308/11 Volkswagen	(Australia) Ryan Astley	All

=== AFO2 entries ===
Team	No.	Car	Driver	Rounds
State Fleet Services	3	Tatuus FT50	(Australia) Matthew Roesler	2
State Fleet Services	4	Tatuus FT50	(Australia) Matthew Roesler	3, 5
AON Investments Pty Ltd	19	Ralt RT4	(Australia) Arthur Abrahams	6
RMS Racing	25	Cheetah Mk7	(Australia) Robert Sviderskas	2
TCM Race Services	53	Tatuus FT50	(Australia) Matthew Woodland	3
Jetforms.com.au	93	Tatuus FT50	(Australia) Christopher Slusarski	3, 6
DiBiase Carpentry	127	Tatuus FT50	(Australia) Paul di Biase	2–3, 6

=== AFO4 entries ===
Team	No.	Car	Driver	Rounds
AGI Sport	6	Mygale M14-F4	(Australia) Brodie Norris	2–6
AGI Sport	40	Mygale M14-F4	(Australia) Tim Boydle	1
AGI Sport	60	Tatuus F4-T014	(Australia) Jayden Ojeda	2
AGI Sport	62	Tatuus F4-T014	(United Kingdom) Craig McLatchey	1
AGI Sport	66	Mygale M14-F4	(Australia) Kristian Janev	2–6
AGI Sport	77	Mygale M14-F4	(Australia) Kristian Janev	1
AGI Sport	77	Mygale M14-F4	(Australia) Peter Bouzinelos	4–6
AGI Sport	7	Mygale M14-F4	(Australia) Mark Wilson	6
AGI Sport	71	Mygale M14-F4	(Australia) Mark Wilson	1–2
Tim Macrow Racing	16	Mygale M14-F4	(Australia) Hanming Huang	1, 3–6
Tim Macrow Racing	25	Mygale M14-F4	(Australia) Thomas Gallagher	4–6
Patrizi Corse	21	Mygale M14-F4	(Australia) Ryan McMillan	4–6
Formula Race Car Association	51	Tatuus F4-T014	(Australia) Nathan Beer	1–2, 6

=== Race calendar ===
The 2023 calendar was first announced on 20 December 2022. It consisted of six rounds across six circuits all over Australia.

Round		Circuit	Date	Support bill	Map of circuit locations
1	R1	(Victoria (state)) Winton Motor Raceway; Winton, Victoria	4 March	NSW Formula Vee Championship; NSW Formula Ford Championship; NSW State Championships	2023 Australian Formula Open Series is located in Australia
1	R2	(Victoria (state)) Winton Motor Raceway; Winton, Victoria	5 March	NSW Formula Vee Championship; NSW Formula Ford Championship; NSW State Championships	2023 Australian Formula Open Series is located in Australia
1	R3	(Victoria (state)) Winton Motor Raceway; Winton, Victoria	5 March	NSW Formula Vee Championship; NSW Formula Ford Championship; NSW State Championships	2023 Australian Formula Open Series is located in Australia
2	R1	Sydney Motorsport Park; Eastern Creek, New South Wales	15 April	NSW Formula Vee Championship; Australian Formula Ford Championship; NSW Formula Ford Championship; NSW State Championships	2023 Australian Formula Open Series is located in Australia
2	R2	Sydney Motorsport Park; Eastern Creek, New South Wales	16 April	NSW Formula Vee Championship; Australian Formula Ford Championship; NSW Formula Ford Championship; NSW State Championships	2023 Australian Formula Open Series is located in Australia
2	R3	Sydney Motorsport Park; Eastern Creek, New South Wales	16 April	NSW Formula Vee Championship; Australian Formula Ford Championship; NSW Formula Ford Championship; NSW State Championships	2023 Australian Formula Open Series is located in Australia
3	R1	The Bend Motorsport Park; Tailem Bend, South Australia	10 June	Lamborghini Super Trofeo Asia; Australian Prototype Series; South Australia Tin Tops; BMW Drivers Cup	2023 Australian Formula Open Series is located in Australia
3	R2	The Bend Motorsport Park; Tailem Bend, South Australia	11 June	Lamborghini Super Trofeo Asia; Australian Prototype Series; South Australia Tin Tops; BMW Drivers Cup	2023 Australian Formula Open Series is located in Australia
3	R3	The Bend Motorsport Park; Tailem Bend, South Australia	11 June	Lamborghini Super Trofeo Asia; Australian Prototype Series; South Australia Tin Tops; BMW Drivers Cup	2023 Australian Formula Open Series is located in Australia
4	R1	Queensland Raceway; Willowbank, Queensland	5 August	Motorsport Australia Trophy Series; TGR Australia Scholarship Series; National Sports Sedan Series; Radical Cup Australia	2023 Australian Formula Open Series is located in Australia
4	R2	Queensland Raceway; Willowbank, Queensland	6 August	Motorsport Australia Trophy Series; TGR Australia Scholarship Series; National Sports Sedan Series; Radical Cup Australia	2023 Australian Formula Open Series is located in Australia
4	R3	Queensland Raceway; Willowbank, Queensland	6 August	Motorsport Australia Trophy Series; TGR Australia Scholarship Series; National Sports Sedan Series; Radical Cup Australia	2023 Australian Formula Open Series is located in Australia
5	R1	(Victoria (state)) Sandown Raceway; Melbourne, Victoria	9 September	TCR Australia Touring Car Series; V8 Touring Car Series; Trans-Am Series; GT4 Australia Series	2023 Australian Formula Open Series is located in Australia
5	R2	(Victoria (state)) Sandown Raceway; Melbourne, Victoria	10 September	TCR Australia Touring Car Series; V8 Touring Car Series; Trans-Am Series; GT4 Australia Series	2023 Australian Formula Open Series is located in Australia
5	R3	(Victoria (state)) Sandown Raceway; Melbourne, Victoria	10 September	TCR Australia Touring Car Series; V8 Touring Car Series; Trans-Am Series; GT4 Australia Series	2023 Australian Formula Open Series is located in Australia
6	R1	(Victoria (state)) Phillip Island Grand Prix Circuit; Ventnor, Victoria	25 November	Island Magic; Historic Touring Car Series; Australian Formula Vee; NSW Formula Car Championship	2023 Australian Formula Open Series is located in Australia
6	R2	(Victoria (state)) Phillip Island Grand Prix Circuit; Ventnor, Victoria	25 November	Island Magic; Historic Touring Car Series; Australian Formula Vee; NSW Formula Car Championship	2023 Australian Formula Open Series is located in Australia
6	R3	(Victoria (state)) Phillip Island Grand Prix Circuit; Ventnor, Victoria	26 November	Island Magic; Historic Touring Car Series; Australian Formula Vee; NSW Formula Car Championship	2023 Australian Formula Open Series is located in Australia

== Race results ==
Round		Circuit	Pole position	Fastest lap	AFO1 winner	AFO2 winner	AFO4 winner
1	R1	(Victoria (state)) Winton Motor Raceway; Winton, Victoria	(Australia) Trent Grubel	(Australia) Trent Grubel	(Australia) Trent Grubel	no entries	(Australia) Kristian Janev
1	R2	(Victoria (state)) Winton Motor Raceway; Winton, Victoria		(Australia) Trent Grubel	(Australia) Trent Grubel	no entries	(Australia) Kristian Janev
1	R3	(Victoria (state)) Winton Motor Raceway; Winton, Victoria		(Australia) Trent Grubel	(Australia) Trent Grubel	no entries	(Australia) Kristian Janev
2	R1	Sydney Motorsport Park; Eastern Creek, New South Wales	(Australia) Trent Grubel	race declared a non-event after multiple crashes at the start			
2	R2	Sydney Motorsport Park; Eastern Creek, New South Wales		(Australia) Trent Grubel	(Australia) Trent Grubel	(Australia) Matthew Roesler	(Australia) Brodie Norris
2	R3	Sydney Motorsport Park; Eastern Creek, New South Wales		(Australia) Trent Grubel	(Australia) Trent Grubel	(Australia) Paul di Biase	(Australia) Kristian Janev
3	R1	The Bend Motorsport Park; Tailem Bend, South Australia	(Australia) Trent Grubel	(Australia) Trent Grubel	(Australia) Ryan How	(Australia) Christopher Slusarski	(Australia) Brodie Norris
3	R2	The Bend Motorsport Park; Tailem Bend, South Australia		(Australia) Ryan How	(Australia) Ryan How	(Australia) Christopher Slusarski	(Australia) Brodie Norris
3	R3	The Bend Motorsport Park; Tailem Bend, South Australia		(Australia) Ryan How	(Australia) Ryan How	(Australia) Christopher Slusarski	(Australia) Brodie Norris
4	R1	Queensland Raceway; Willowbank, Queensland	(Australia) Ryan How	(Australia) Miles Bromley	(Australia) Trent Grubel	no entries	(Australia) Brodie Norris
4	R2	Queensland Raceway; Willowbank, Queensland		(Australia) Ryan How	(Australia) Trent Grubel	no entries	(Australia) Brodie Norris
4	R3	Queensland Raceway; Willowbank, Queensland		(Australia) Trent Grubel	(Australia) Ryan How	no entries	(Australia) Peter Bouzinelous
5	R1	(Victoria (state)) Sandown Raceway; Melbourne, Victoria	(Australia) Ryan How	(Australia) Trent Grubel	(Australia) Ryan How	no classified finishers	(Australia) Brodie Norris
5	R2	(Victoria (state)) Sandown Raceway; Melbourne, Victoria		(Australia) Trent Grubel	(Australia) Ryan How	(Australia) Matthew Roesler	(Australia) Brodie Norris
5	R3	(Victoria (state)) Sandown Raceway; Melbourne, Victoria		(Australia) Ryan How	(Australia) Trent Grubel	(Australia) Matthew Roesler	(Australia) Kristian Janev
6	R1	(Victoria (state)) Phillip Island Grand Prix Circuit; Ventnor, Victoria	(Australia) Trent Grubel	(Australia) Trent Grubel	(Australia) Ryan How	(Australia) Ryan McMillan	(Australia) Christopher Slusarski
6	R2	(Victoria (state)) Phillip Island Grand Prix Circuit; Ventnor, Victoria		(Australia) Ryan How	(Australia) Ryan How	(Australia) Ryan McMillan	(Australia) Paul di Biase
6	R3	(Victoria (state)) Phillip Island Grand Prix Circuit; Ventnor, Victoria		(Australia) Ryan How	(Australia) Ryan How	(Australia) Ryan McMillan	(Australia) Paul di Biase

== Season report ==
The inaugural Australian Formula Open series kicked off at Winton Motor Raceway. A conjoined grid with the NSW Formula Car Championship saw 19 entries tackle the weekend, and Tim Macrow Racing's Trent Grubel took pole position for the first race. He converted that to a win ahead of his teammates Winston van Laarhoven and Ryan How. Grubel went on to sweep the weekend, with the podiums of both other races completed by 99 Motorsport's Ryan Astley and How. AGI Sport's Kristian Janev also took a triple win in the AFO4 class to take the class lead ahead of his teammate Mark Wilson.

Round two was held at Sydney Motorsports Park, again in conjunction with the NSW FCC. Grubel was once again on pole position for the first encounter, but multiple crashes at the race start led to the race being abandoned and later declared a non-event. Grubel was undeterred by that and went on to win the other two races, remaining as the only AFO1 winner of the season. How took both second places, with Gilmour Racing's debutant Jon Collings taking two third places. Janev and his debuting teammate Brodie Norris shared wins in AFO4, while the AFO2 class also took off, with privateer entries Matthew Roesler and Paul di Biase taking the honors.

The first half of the season closed at The Bend Motorsport Park. Grubel continued his pole position streak, but the formbook for the races was rewritten: How became the second race winner in the series as he was the fastest driver throughout all three races to sweep the weekend. Grubel held on to second ahead of Astley in races one and three, but only managed to finish fourth in the second race, with his teammate Miles Bromley third behind Astley. Brodie Norris continued his run of form to sweep the weekend in AFO4 and shorten his gap to Janev. Debutant Christopher Slusarski won all thee races in AFO2, while class leader Di Biase did not finish any of the races.

Queensland Raceway was up next, and How ended Grubel's pole position streak. He dropped to third in the first race though, allowing Grubel to take the win and Chris Gilmour, debuting for the eponymous team, into second. The second race proved even worse for How, as a bad start saw him drop off the podium and allowed Bromley onto it. How was back on top for the feature race though, but Grubel still extended his points lead. AFO2 saw no entries for the round, while AFO4 class leader Janev had an atrocious weekend with a retirement in the first race not allowing him to take part in the rest of the weekend. The chasing Norris took two wins and his teammate Peter Bouzinelous claimed one.

How took a second pole position at the penultimate round at Sandown Raceway. Him and Grubel finished 1-2 in the first two races, with Grubel taking both fastest laps to minimize the damage to his points lead. Their positions were flipped for the final race, but How still reduced Grubel's advantage to 20 points. Bromley took two more podiums to get closer to third place, with TWS Motorsport's Trent Shirvington also appearing on the rostrum. Roesler was the only entrant in the AFO2 class, so he took two more wins to extend his lead, while Norris and Janev continued their tussle in the AFO4 class, with Norris taking two wins to reduce Janev's lead to only three points.

How needed a perfect final weekend at Phillip Island to deny Grubel the title, and did everything he could by winning all three races and taking two bonus points for fastest laps. Grubel could only manage second, third and fourth in the races. Crucially though, he was able to take pole position and claim the fastest lap for the first race. That saw him take the overall and the AFO1 title by three points. Bromley took three podiums to narrowly secure third ahead of Astley. Both AFO2 and AFO4 were decided in absence of the champions, with Roesler taking the AFO2 crown and both Janev and Norris absent from AFO4 competition, allowing Janev to claim the title.

Opening up competition to more classes of formula cars proved to be a huge success, as the series' meetings regularly attracted deep grids. While competition in AFO1 and AFO4 initially seemed to be rather lacklustre, How and Norris were able to close up to the respective leaders Grubel and Janev to provide two close championship battles. With the series planned to be expanding in both round numbers and national and international coverage in 2024, the only question left open is if the championship will really be able to serve as a feeder series to higher-level competition.

== Standings ==
=== Scoring system ===
Cars classified as finished in race 1 and 2 were awarded points by the following structure:

Position	1st	2nd	3rd	4th	5th	6th	7th	8th	9th	10th	FL	R1 PP
Points	12	9	8	7	6	5	4	3	2	1	1	1

The third race of the weekend, the longer Feature Race, awarded more points:

Position	1st	2nd	3rd	4th	5th	6th	7th	8th	9th	10th	FL
Points	20	15	12	10	8	6	4	3	2	1	1

=== Overall standings ===
Pos	Driver	WIN (Victoria (state))			SYD (New South Wales)			BEN (South Australia)			QLD (Queensland)			SAN (Victoria (state))			PHI (Victoria (state))			Pts
Pos	Driver	R1	R2	R3	R1	R2	R3	R1	R2	R3	R1	R2	R3	R1	R2	R3	R1	R2	R3	Pts
1	(Australia) Trent Grubel	1	1	1	C	1	1	2	4	2	1	1	2	2	2	1	2	3	4	225
2	(Australia) Ryan How	3	3	3	C	2	2	1	1	1	3	4	1	1	1	2	1	1	1	222
3	(Australia) Miles Bromley				C	7	5	4	3	10	4	2	3	5	3	3	3	2	2	117
4	(Australia) Ryan Astley	4	2	2	C	4	6	3	2	3	5	Ret	Ret	4	4	Ret	6	5	5	112
5	(Australia) Winston Van Laarhoven	2	4	4	C	5	4	5	9	5	7	6	4							77
6	(Australia) Beau Russell													6	DNS	4	4	4	3	41
7	(Australia) Brodie Norris				C	8	Ret	8	6	6	8	7	8	7	5	7	DNS	DNS	DNS	41
8	(Australia) Jon Collins				C	3	3				6	5	5	DNS	DNS	DNS				39
9	(Australia) Trent Shirvington				C	13	Ret	6	5	4				3	9	5				39
10	(Australia) Andrew Roberts	5	5	5	C	6	7	Ret	DNS	DNS							9	9	7	37
11	(Australia) Kristian Janev	6	6	7	C	11	10	11	8	8	Ret	DNS	DNS	10	6	6	DNS	DNS	DNS	33
12	(Australia) Chris Gilmour										2	3	6	DNS	DNS	DNS				23
13	(Australia) Kyle Evans																5	6	6	17
14	(Australia) Ryan McMillan										9	9	9	DNS	DNS	DNS	7	7	8	17
15	(Australia) Thomas Gallagher										12	Ret	10	8	7	8	13	10	9	14
16	(Australia) Lawrence Katsidis	8	8	6	C	DNS	DNS										16	Ret	13	12
17	(Australia) Christopher Slusarski							7	7	7							11	13	Ret	12
18	(Australia) Douglas Barry	14	15	13	C	9	8										8	8	12	11
19	(Australia) Hanming Huang	11	10	8				10	11	12	11	10	11	9	10	9	15	14	14	11
20	(Australia) Matthew Roesler				C	16	Ret	9	10	9				Ret	8	10				9
21	(Australia) Graeme Holmes	7	7	DNS	C	DNS	DNS													8
22	(Australia) Peter Bouzinelous										10	8	7	Ret	11	Ret	DNS	DNS	DNS	8
23	(Australia) Rodney Baker				C	10	9										10	11	10	5
24	(Australia) Mark Wilson	10	9	10	C	19	14										14	15	Ret	4
25	(United Kingdom) Craig McLatchey	9	11	DNS																2
26	(Australia) Rod Anderson	12	13	9	C	18	15													2
27	(Australia) Matthew Woodland							12	12	11										0
28	(Australia) Tim Boydle	15	12	11																0
29	(Australia) Greg Muddle	Ret	DNS	Ret	C	Ret	11													0
30	(Australia) Ben Turner				C	12	12													0
31	(Australia) Nathan Beer	16	16	12	C	20	17										17	16	15	0
32	(Australia) Paul di Biase				C	17	16	Ret	Ret	Ret							12	12	11	0
33	(Australia) Shayne Morrow	13	14	Ret	C	15	Ret										Ret	DNS	DNS	0
34	(Australia) Glenn Lynch	DNS	DNS	DNS	C	14	13													0
—	(Australia) Gerrit Ruff				C	DNS	DNS										DNS	DNS	DNS	—
—	(Australia) Daniel Price	DNS	DNS	DNS																—
—	(Australia) Robert Rowe																DNS	DNS	DNS	—
—	(Australia) Arthur Abrahams																DNS	DNS	DNS	—
—	(Australia) Ron Coath				C	DNS	DNS													—
—	(Australia) Robert Sviderskas				C	DNS	DNS													—
—
Pos	Driver	R1	R2	R3	R1	R2	R3	R1	R2	R3	R1	R2	R3	R1	R2	R3	R1	R2	R3	Pts
Pos	Driver	WIN (Victoria (state))			SYD (New South Wales)			BEN (South Australia)			QLD (Queensland)			SAN (Victoria (state))			PHI (Victoria (state))			Pts

=== Standings by class ===
Pos	Driver	WIN (Victoria (state))			SYD (New South Wales)			BEN (South Australia)			QLD (Queensland)			SAN (Victoria (state))			PHI (Victoria (state))			Pts
Pos	Driver	R1	R2	R3	R1	R2	R3	R1	R2	R3	R1	R2	R3	R1	R2	R3	R1	R2	R3	Pts
AFO1 standings
1	(Australia) Trent Grubel	1	1	1	C	1	1	2	4	2	1	1	2	2	2	1	2	3	4	225
2	(Australia) Ryan How	3	3	3	C	2	2	1	1	1	3	4	1	1	1	2	1	1	1	222
3	(Australia) Miles Bromley				C	7	5	4	3	6	4	2	3	5	3	3	3	2	2	120
4	(Australia) Ryan Astley	4	2	2	C	4	6	3	2	3	5	Ret	Ret	4	4	Ret	6	5	5	107
5	(Australia) Winston Van Laarhoven	2	4	4	C	5	4	5	6	5	7	6	4							80
6	(Australia) Trent Shirvington				C	11	Ret	6	5	4				3	5	5				43
7	(Australia) Beau Russell													6	DNS	4	4	4	3	41
8	(Australia) Andrew Roberts	5	5	5	C	6	7	Ret	DNS	DNS							7	8	7	40
9	(Australia) Jon Collins				C	3	3				6	5	5	DNS	DNS	DNS				39
10	(Australia) Chris Gilmour										2	3	6	DNS	DNS	DNS				23
11	(Australia) Douglas Barry	10	10	8	C	8	8										6	7	9	23
12	(Australia) Kyle Evans																5	6	6	17
13	(Australia) Lawrence Katsidis	7	7	6	C	DNS	DNS										9	Ret	10	17
14	(Australia) Rodney Baker				C	9	9										8	9	8	12
15	(Australia) Graeme Holmes	6	6	DNS	C	DNS	DNS													10
16	(Australia) Rod Anderson	8	8	7	C	14	13													10
17	(Australia) Shayne Morrow	9	9	Ret	C	13	Ret										Ret	DNS	DNS	4
18	(Australia) Ben Turner				C	10	11													1
19	(Australia) Greg Muddle	Ret	DNS	Ret	C	Ret	10													1
20	(Australia) Glenn Lynch	DNS	DNS	DNS	C	12	12													0
—	(Australia) Gerrit Ruff				C	DNS	DNS										DNS	DNS	DNS	—
—	(Australia) Daniel Price	DNS	DNS	DNS																—
—	(Australia) Robert Rowe																DNS	DNS	DNS	—
—	(Australia) Ron Coath				C	DNS	DNS													—
AFO2 standings
1	(Australia) Matthew Roesler				C	1	Ret	2	2	2				Ret	1	1				83
2	(Australia) Christopher Slusarski							1	1	1							1	2	Ret	72
3	(Australia) Paul di Biase				C	2	1	Ret	Ret	Ret							2	1	1	72
4	(Australia) Matthew Woodland							3	3	3										28
–	(Australia) Robert Sviderskas				C	DNS	DNS													—
—	(Australia) Arthur Abrahams																DNS	DNS	DNS	—
AFO4 standings
1	(Australia) Kristian Janev	1	1	1	C	2	1	3	2	2	Ret	DNS	DNS	4	2	1	DNS	DNS	DNS	139
2	(Australia) Brodie Norris				C	1	Ret	1	1	1	1	1	2	1	1	2	DNS	DNS	DNS	136
3	(Australia) Hanming Huang	4	3	2				2	3	3	4	4	5	3	4	4	4	3	3	133
4	(Australia) Thomas Gallagher										5	Ret	4	2	3	3	2	2	2	80
5	(Australia) Ryan McMillan										2	3	3	DNS	DNS	DNS	1	1	1	77
6	(Australia) Mark Wilson	3	2	3	C	3	2										3	4	Ret	67
7	(Australia) Nathan Beer	6	6	5	C	4	3										5	5	4	59
8	(Australia) Peter Bouzinelos										3	2	1	Ret	5	Ret	DNS	DNS	DNS	44
9	(Australia) Tim Boydle	5	5	4																22
10	(United Kingdom) Craig McLatchey	2	4	DNS																16
—	(Australia) Jayden Ojeda				C	DNS	DNS													—
Pos	Driver	R1	R2	R3	R1	R2	R3	R1	R2	R3	R1	R2	R3	R1	R2	R3	R1	R2	R3	Pts
Pos	Driver	WIN (Victoria (state))			SYD (New South Wales)			BEN (South Australia)			QLD (Queensland)			SAN (Victoria (state))			PHI (Victoria (state))			Pts
