= 2021 Australian Formula 3 Championship =

Motor racing championship held in 2021

The 2021 Australian Formula 3 Championship is an Australian open-wheel racing series for FIA Formula 3 cars constructed and conforming to the regulations before and including 2016, having previously been before and including 2011 the previous season. The season began on 5 March 2021 at Sydney Motorsport Park and was planned to finish on 5 December 2021 at The Bend Motorsport Park. Organized by Formula Three Management Pty Ltd, it is to be the 22nd season of Australian Formula 3, with the 2020 season having been cancelled due to the COVID-19 pandemic. This is also the first season where the championship winner would earn a prize S5000 test drive. After the first round at Sydney the remaining rounds had to be cancelled due to COVID-19 travel restrictions being in place. Attention was then turned to the 2022 season.

== Teams and drivers ==
The following teams and drivers contested the 2021 Australian Formula 3 Championship. All teams are Australian-registered.

Team	Chassis	Engine	No.	Driver	Class	Rounds
R-Tek Motorsport	Dallara F307	Opel-Spiess	6	(Australia) Max de Meyrick	N	1
R-Tek Motorsport	Dallara F307	Opel-Spiess	7	(Australia) Mitch Neilson	N	1
R-Tek Motorsport	Dallara F311	Mercedes	8	(Taiwan) Ray-Yu Wang	C	1
McAlpine Motorsport	Mygale M11	Mercedes	9	(Australia) Ross McAlpine	C	1
Gilmour Racing	Dallara F311	Mercedes	17	(Australia) Roman Krumins	C	1
Ruff Racing	Dallara F307	Mercedes	22	(Australia) Gerrit Ruff	N	1
Tim Macrow Racing	Dallara F311	Mercedes	25	(Australia) Ben Taylor	C	1
99 Motorsport	Dallara F311	Volkswagen	99	(Australia) Ryan Astley	C	1
TBA	Dallara F307	Toyota	21	(Australia) Matthew Vanderburg	N	1

Icon	Class
C	Championship
N	National
I	Invitational

=== Classes ===
Competing cars were nominated into one of three classes:

- Championship Class – for automobiles constructed in accordance with the FIA Formula 3 regulations that applied in the year of manufacture between 1 January 2002 and 31 December 2016. It was announced that new for this season, all cars entered would qualify for Championship Class. However, this clearly has since been reversed.
- National Class – for automobiles constructed in accordance with the FIA Formula 3 regulations that applied in the year of manufacture between 1 January 2002 and 31 December 2007.
- Invitation Category – for automobiles constructed in accordance with the FIA Formula 3 regulations that applied in the year of manufacture before 2002, as well as other open wheel ‘wings and slicks’ cars including Formula 1000, Formula Ford 2000, Formula Renault, Formula BMW, TRS, Formula 4, etc.

== Calendar & race results ==
The series is to be contested over six rounds. All rounds will be held in Australia.

Round 2 at Morgan Park Raceway was originally to be held on 11–13 April but was postponed on 31 March due to COVID-19 restrictions. Again, Round 3 at Winton Motor Raceway was affected by similar regional COVID-19 restrictions, firstly being pushed back from the original date of 11–13 June to 16–18 July, then being classified as a Non-championship round due to some entrants not being able to enter Victoria, and finally being postponed on 15 July. It was then rescheduled for 20–22 August The AMRS announced the cancellation of the subsequent round at Queensland, previously to be held between 6–8 August, due to an inability to reschedule the meeting if it were postponed.

Round		Circuit	Date	Pole position	Fastest lap	Championship Class Winner	National Class Winner
1	R1	(New South Wales) Sydney Motorsport Park	6 March	(Australia) Ben Taylor	(Australia) Ben Taylor	(Australia) Roman Krumins	(Australia) Mitch Neilson
1	R2	(New South Wales) Sydney Motorsport Park	7 March		(Australia) Max de Meyrick	(Australia) Ryan Astley	(Australia) Mitch Neilson
1	R3	(New South Wales) Sydney Motorsport Park	7 March	(Australia) Ben Taylor	(Australia) Max de Meyrick	(Australia) Ben Taylor	(Australia) Max de Meyrick
Cancelled due to COVID-19 pandemic
N/A	R1	(New South Wales) Wakefield Park	N/A	N/A			
N/A	R2	(New South Wales) Wakefield Park	N/A	N/A			
N/A	R3	(New South Wales) Wakefield Park	N/A	N/A			
N/A	R1	(South Australia) The Bend Motorsport Park	N/A	N/A			
N/A	R2	(South Australia) The Bend Motorsport Park	N/A	N/A			
N/A	R3	(South Australia) The Bend Motorsport Park	N/A	N/A			
N/A	R1	(Queensland) Morgan Park Raceway	N/A	N/A			
N/A	R2	(Queensland) Morgan Park Raceway	N/A	N/A			
N/A	R3	(Queensland) Morgan Park Raceway	N/A	N/A			
N/A	R1	Queensland Raceway	N/A	N/A			
N/A	R2	Queensland Raceway	N/A	N/A			
N/A	R3	Queensland Raceway	N/A	N/A			

== Championship standings ==
Points system

Points for are awarded as follows:

Position	1st	2nd	3rd	4th	5th	6th	7th	8th	9th	10th	FL	Pole
Race 1 and 2	12	9	8	7	6	5	4	3	2	1	1	1
Race 3	20	15	12	10	8	6	4	3	2	1	1	1

=== Drivers' championship ===
Pos	Driver	SYD			Pts
**Championship**
1	(Australia) Ben Taylor	**4**	5	**1**	42
2	(Australia) Ryan Astley	5	3	3	35
3	(Australia) Roman Krumins	3	7	4	31
4	(Taiwan) Ray-Yu Wang	6	6	5	25
5	(Australia) Ross McAlpine	7	8	Ret	12
**National**
1	(Australia) Max de Meyrick	**8**	2	2	40
2	(Australia) Mitch Neilson	1	1	7	37
3	(Australia) Gerrit Ruff	2	4	6	32
-	(Australia) Matthew Vanderburg	WD	WD	WD	-
Pos	Driver	SYD			Pts

Colour	Result
Gold	Winner
Silver	Second place
Bronze	Third place
Green	Points classification
Blue	Non-points classification
Blue	Non-classified finish (NC)
Purple	Retired, not classified (Ret)
Red	Did not qualify (DNQ)
Red	Did not pre-qualify (DNPQ)
Black	Disqualified (DSQ)
White	Did not start (DNS)
White	Withdrew (WD)
White	Race cancelled (C)
Blank	Did not practice (DNP)
Blank	Did not arrive (DNA)
Blank	Excluded (EX)

Bold – Pole
Italics – Fastest lap
