= The Bend Motorsport Park =

Motorsport track in South Australia

Shell V-Power Motorsport Park
- International Circuit (2018–present)

- GT Circuit (2018–present)
- Location: Tailem Bend, South Australia, Australia
- Coordinates: 35°18′30″S 139°31′0″E
- FIA Grade: 2 (3 layouts)
- Owner: Peregrine Corporation
- Broke ground: March 2016; 10 years ago
- Opened: 13 January 2018; 8 years ago
- Former names: The Bend Motorsport Park (January 2018–August 2023)
- Major events: Current: Supercars Championship; The Bend 500 (2025–present); The Bend SuperSprint (2018–2023); GT World Challenge Australia (2018–2019, 2021–present); Australian SBK (2018–2019, 2021–present); Future: World SBK (2028); Former: TCR World Tour (2025); TCR Australia (2019, 2024–2025); Lamborghini Super Trofeo Asia (2023–2024); S5000 (2019, 2023); Asian Le Mans Series (2020); Asia Road Racing Championship (2018–2019)
- Website: www.thebend.com.au

GT Circuit (2018–present)
- Length: 7.770 km (4.828 mi)
- Turns: 35
- Race lap record: 2:38.673 ( (Australia) Aidan Read, Ligier JS P217, 2020, LMP2)

International Circuit (2018–present)
- Length: 4.950 km (3.076 mi)
- Turns: 18
- Race lap record: 1:40.7295 ( (Australia) John Magro, Dallara F308, 2019, F3)

West Circuit (2018–present)
- Length: 3.410 km (2.119 mi)
- Turns: 12
- Race lap record: 1:10.085 ( (Australia) Josh Kean, Footwork FA15, 2020, F1)

East Circuit (2018–present)
- Length: 3.930 km (2.442 mi)
- Turns: 22

West PLUS Circuit (2018–present)
- Length: 3.660 km (2.274 mi)
- Turns: 17

Sprint Circuit (2018–present)
- Length: 2.784 km (1.730 mi)
- Turns: 11

Southwest Circuit (2018–present)
- Length: 1.811 km (1.125 mi)
- Turns: 7

North Circuit (2018–present)
- Length: 1.341 km (0.833 mi)
- Turns: 13

Karting Circuit (2018–present)
- Length: 1.101 km (0.684 mi)
- Turns: 16

Drag Strip (2023–present)
- Length: 0.402 km (0.250 mi)

The Bend Motorsport Park, currently known as Shell V-Power Motorsport Park for naming rights reasons, is a 7.770 km (4.828 mi) bitumen motor racing circuit at Tailem Bend, South Australia, Australia, about 100 km (62 mi) south-east of the state capital, Adelaide.

The complex has a bitumen circuit, drag racing strip, and drift racing circuit.

The race circuits are of a high international standard and licensed by the Fédération Internationale de l'Automobile (FIA) for car racing and the Fédération Internationale de Motocyclisme (FIM) for motorcycle racing. Along with Sydney Motorsport Park, Surfers Paradise Street Circuit and the only Grade 1 track, the Albert Park Grand Prix Circuit, The Bend is one of only four race circuits in Australia with an FIA Grade 2 track licence or better, and it is also one of only two Australian race tracks along with the Phillip Island Grand Prix Circuit (which hosts the annual Australian MotoGP and Superbike World Championship (WSBK) rounds), to carry an FIM Category A track licence.

The circuit name was changed to Shell V-Power Motorsport Park in August 2023.

== History ==
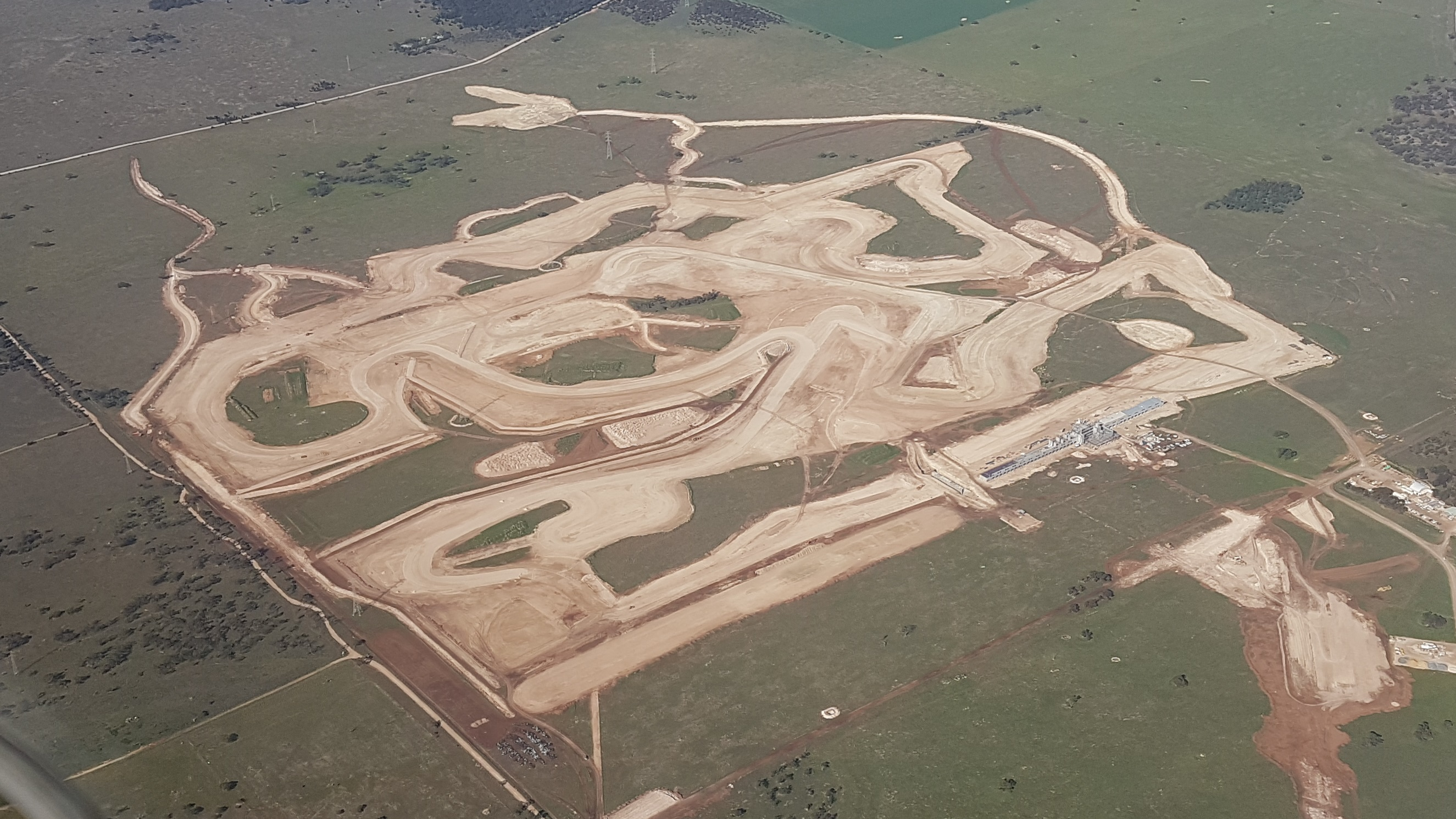
Circuit Construction progress in July 2017

In February 2015, Peregrine Corporation lodged plans with the Government of South Australia to redevelop the former Mitsubishi Motors Australia test track at Tailem Bend, South Australia which had lay dormant since Mitsubishi ceased their Australian production in 2008 with the closure of their Adelaide manufacturing plant at Tonsley and their engine plant at Lonsdale. Approval was granted in May 2015 with construction commencing in March 2016. Initially titled the South Australian Motorsport Park, by the time construction commenced, The Bend Motorsport Park name had been adopted.

The address of the site was originally in Elwomple. In September 2017, before the facility opened, the boundary between Tailem Bend and Elwomple was adjusted so that The Bend Motorsport Park is officially in Tailem Bend, not Elwomple.

The first major event was the Revolve24 Endurance Cycling Challenge on 13–14 January 2018, an ultra-distance cycling festival featuring 24-hour, 12-hour and 6-hour races. It hosted The Bend SuperSprint, a round of the 2018 Supercars Championship, in August 2018. It has a desire to hold a MotoGP Australian Motorcycle Grand Prix round.

On 4–14 January 2019, the circuit hosted the 25th Australian Scout Jamboree. From January 10–12, 2020 it hosted a round of the 2019–20 Asian Le Mans Series season as the 4 Hours of The Bend and the Supercars sprint round would be replaced by a new endurance event, The Bend 500. The Supercars race was later dropped from the calendar altogether, in a shortened calendar due to the COVID-19 pandemic, with circuit managing director Sam Shahin openly critical of the cancellation. After multiple changes in the Supercars calendar, it was announced that the track would held a doubleheader in late September.

Sam Shahin also offered up the facility for Hotel Quarantine during the COVID-19 pandemic, but this was not taken up by the South Australian Government.

== Facilities ==
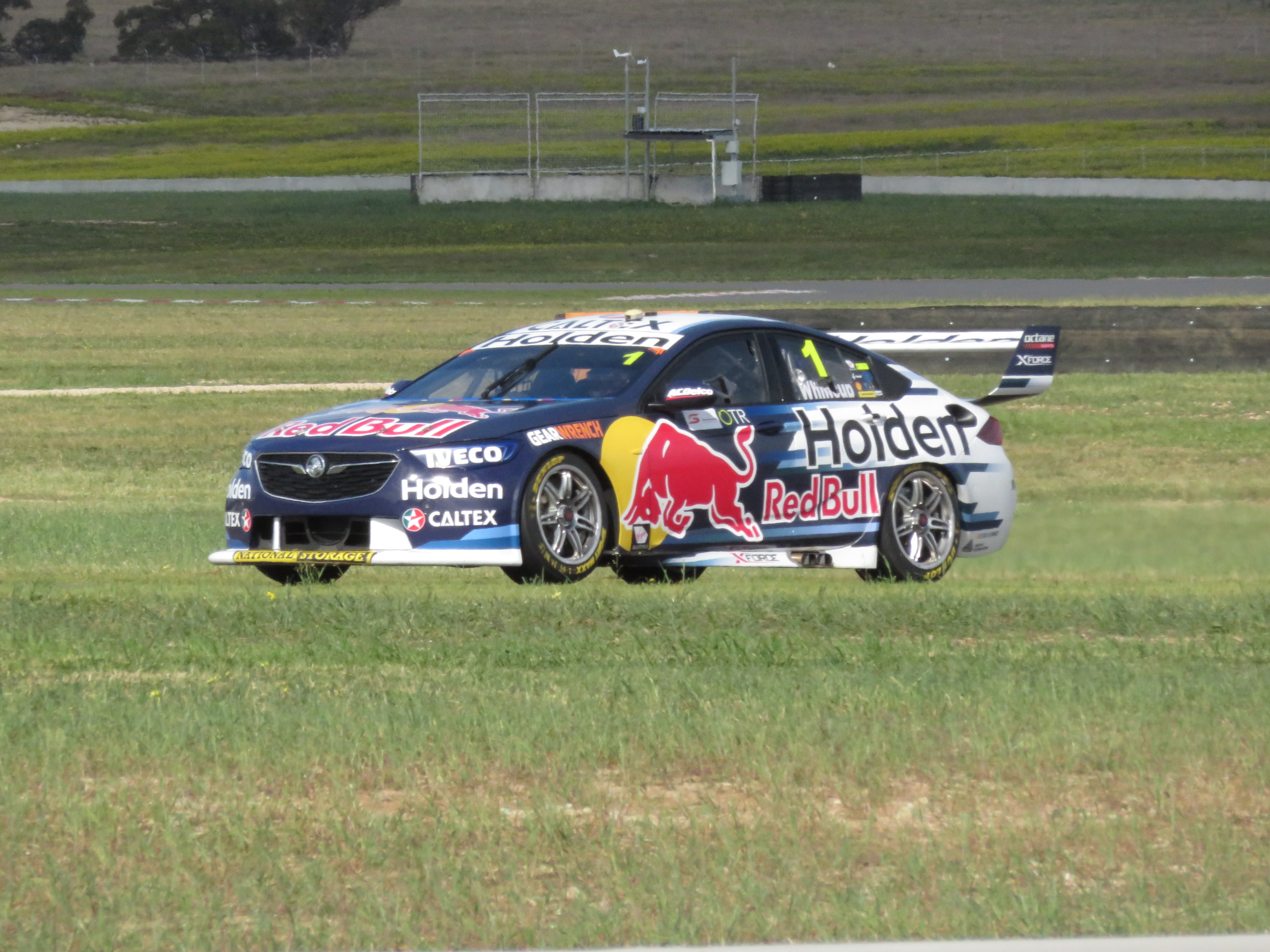
Jamie Whincup won the Sunday race at the first Supercars Championship event at the circuit in 2018.

=== International Circuit ===
Length: 4.950 km (3.076 mi)

- Used for majority of events including Supercars, Superbikes and national series events, through to state racing, club racing and track hire

=== GT Circuit ===
Length: 7.770 km (4.828 mi)

- The Bend's GT Circuit is used for endurance racing, specialist racing events, private hire and test days. It is the longest motor racing circuit in Australia since the closure of the 7.242 km (4.500 mi) Longford Circuit in Tasmania in 1968.

At 7.770 km (4.828 mi) long, the 35 turn GT Circuit is the second longest permanent race track in the world behind only the famed Nürburgring Nordschleife in Germany which is 20.832 km (12.944 mi) long. It is also one of only 4 permanent race circuits in the world with an official length of at least 7.000 km (4.350 mi), the others being the 154 turn Nürburgring, the 7.220 km (4.486 mi), 23 turn Burt Brothers Motorpark (formerly known as the Utah Motorsports Campus and Miller Motorsports Park) in the USA, and the 7.004 km (4.352 mi), 20 turn Circuit de Spa-Francorchamps in Belgium.

The circuit hosted a four-hour Asian Le Mans Series (ALMS) event in January 2020 called the 4 Hours of The Bend. Unfortunately it has proven to be a one off race as the planned return of the ALMS did not eventuate due to the COVID-19 pandemic. It was announced that the ALMS would return in 2021–22 and 2022–23, but the global pandemic and a change in series focus to an annual series, plus cutting costs for the teams (including travel), has seen that to date (2025), the ALMS has not returned to Australia or The Bend.

=== West Circuit ===
Length: 3.410 km (2.119 mi)

- Used for the majority of short track events. Includes club racing, testing, sprint events, “cruising” events, driver/rider training
- Used for 2020 OTR SuperSprint The Bend event in 2020 Supercars Championship
- Can be used independently from the East Circuit
- Will be used for The Bend 500 in 2026

=== East Circuit ===
Length: 3.930 km (2.442 mi)

- Used for driver/rider training, drifting, testing, club days, private days
- Can be used independently from the West Circuit

=== West PLUS Circuit ===
Length: 3.660 km (2.274 mi)

=== Sprint Circuit ===
Length: 2.784 km (1.730 mi)

=== Southwest Circuit ===
Length: 1.811 km (1.125 mi)

=== North Circuit ===
Length: 1.341 km (0.833 mi)

=== Karting Circuit ===
Length: 1.101 km (0.684 mi)

=== Drag Strip ===
Length: 0.402 km (0.250 mi)

The drag racing strip at The Bend opened to fanfare and a capacity 20,000 crowd in October 2023. The drag strip itself is approximately 1.250 km (0.777 mi) in total length by 18.5 m (61 ft) wide, built to international standards. The Bend's drag racing strip has taken over from the older (and shorter) Adelaide International Raceway as South Australia's main drag racing venue.

=== Pit building and hotel ===
Construction commenced in February 2017 for the 300 m (980 ft) long pit building which includes hotel accommodation in the upper levels of the four-storey building. There are 34 pit garages. The 100 room Rydges Pit Lane Hotel opened in 2019.

== Layout configurations ==
The Bend Motorsport Park layout configurations
GT Circuit (2018–present)

International Circuit (2018–present)

West Circuit (2018–present)

== Events ==
Current

- March: Australian Formula Ford Championship, TA2 Racing Muscle Car Series, Australian Drivers' Championship
- May: GT World Challenge Australia Race Tailem Bend, Porsche Sprint Challenge Australia, Ferrari Challenge Australasia, GT4 Australia Series, Australian Superbike Championship, Radical Cup Australia, Mustang Cup Australia
- June: CERA Excel Nationals
- July: AU4 Australian Championship
- August: AU4 Australian Championship
- September: Supercars Championship The Bend 500, Australian National Trans-Am Series, Porsche Carrera Cup Australia Championship, Aussie Racing Cars, Touring Car Masters
- October: National Sports Sedan Series, The Bend Classic
- November: Australian Superbike Championship

Future

- Superbike World Championship (2028)
- Supersport World Championship (2028)

Former

- Asia Road Racing Championship (2018–2019)
- Asian Le Mans Series
  - 4 Hours of The Bend (2020)
- Australian Formula 3 Championship (2018–2019, 2022)
- Australian Production Car Championship (2019, 2021–2024)
- Australian Prototype Series (2018–2019, 2022–2025)
- Australian Superkart Championship (2019, 2021–2024)
- Lamborghini Super Trofeo Asia (2023–2024)
- S5000 Australian Drivers' Championship (2019, 2023)
- Super3 Series (2018–2019)
- Supercars Championship
  - The Bend SuperSprint (2018–2023)
- SuperUtes Series (2022–2023)
- TCR Australia Touring Car Series (2019, 2024–2025)
- TCR World Tour (2025)
- Toyota 86 Racing Series (2018, 2023)

== Lap records ==
As of September 2025, the fastest official lap for the GT Circuit was set in qualifying for the 4 Hours of The Bend by British driver Ben Barnicoat who took pole position in a Dallara P217 LMP2 with a time of 2:35.698. The circuit's official lap record, set during the 4 Hours of The Bend race, is 2:38.673 by New Zealand's Aidan Read driving a Ligier JS P217 LMP2.

As of September 2026, the fastest official race lap records at The Bend Motorsport Park are listed as:

Category	Time	Driver	Vehicle	Date
GT Circuit (2018–present): 7.770 km (4.828 mi)
LMP2	2:38.673	Aidan Read	Ligier JS P217	12 January 2020
LMP3	2:51.692	David Fumanelli	Ligier JS P3	12 January 2020
GT3	2:56.990	Alessandro Pier Guidi	Ferrari 488 GT3	12 January 2020
CN	3:00.3237	Mark Short	Prince LSR	24 November 2024
Production Cars	3:45.671	Keith Wong	Honda Integra DC5	12 January 2020
International Circuit (2018–present): 4.950 km (3.076 mi)
Formula Three	1:40.7295	John Magro	Dallara F308	23 June 2019
S5000	1:41.2560	Thomas Randle	Ligier JS F3-S5000	16 November 2019
GT3	1:45.6607	Jamie Whincup	Mercedes-AMG GT3	13 July 2019
Superkart	1:46.6960	Jordan Ford	Anderson Maverick	10 April 2021
Sports Sedans	1:47.0564	Jordan Caruso	Audi A4-Chevrolet	31 July 2022
Group CN	1:47.1031	Mark Laucke	Wolf GB08 Tornado	18 September 2021
Lamborghini Super Trofeo	1:48.3219	Jonathan Cecotto	Lamborghini Huracán Super Trofeo EVO2	11 June 2023
Toyota Racing Series	1:49.2963	Christopher Slusarski	Tatuus FT-50	10 June 2023
Supercars	1:49.4042	David Reynolds	Holden ZB Commodore	24 August 2019
Formula 4	1:49.8767	James Piszcyk	Tatuus F4-T421	5 May 2024
Radical Cup	1:49.886	Isaac McNeill	Radical RSX 1500	3 May 2026
Superbike	1:50.035	Cru Halliday	Ducati Panigale V4 R	9 November 2025
Porsche Carrera Cup	1:50.7966	Jordan Love	Porsche 911 (991 II) GT3 Cup	25 August 2019
Ferrari Challenge	1:51.3360	Enzo Cheng	Ferrari 296 Challenge	6 September 2025
Supersport	1:53.724	Archie McDonald	Yamaha YZF-R6	9 November 2025
Trans-Am Australia	1:54.9677	Nathan Herne	Ford Mustang Trans-Am	13 September 2025
GT4	1:56.2054	Jobe Stewart	Audi R8 LMS GT4 Evo	10 May 2026
TCR Touring Car	1:56.4810	Mikel Azcona	Hyundai Elantra N TCR	13 September 2025
Formula Ford	1:57.5339	Angelo Mouzouris	Mygale SJ18A	23 June 2019
Mustang Cup	1:59.9080	Josh Anderson	Ford Mustang Dark Horse R	10 May 2026
Improved Production Cars	2:00.2456	Adam Poole	Holden Monaro	25 May 2024
Touring Car Masters	2:00.2787	Joel Heinrich	Chevrolet Camaro RS	24 November 2024
Sidecar F1	2:04.715	Corey Turner/Danyon Turner	LCR-Suzuki GSXR-1000	1 March 2025
Aussie Racing Cars	2:05.3605	Joel Heinrich	Chevrolet Camaro	14 September 2025
Asia Production 250	2:07.170	Muklada Sarapuech	Honda CBR250RR	28 April 2019
Supersport 300	2:08.775	Jordan Simpson	Yamaha YZF-R3	10 November 2024
Sidecar F2	2:09.347	Jamie Crass/Lee Menzies	Windle-Suzuki GSXR-600	16 March 2024
SuperUtes	2:10.8731	David Sieders	Mazda BT-50	20 August 2023
Toyota 86 Racing Series	2:15.3067	Jayden Wanzek	Toyota 86	26 May 2024
Asia Underbone 150	2:16.894	Md Helmi Azman	Yamaha MX King 150	22 April 2018
Oceania Junior Cup	2:29.820	Valentino Knezovic	Yamaha YZF-R15	3 December 2023
West Circuit (2018–present): 3.410 km (2.119 mi)
Formula One	1:10.085	Josh Kean	Footwork FA15	5 September 2020
GT3	1:14.9167	Jaxon Evans	Ferrari 296 GT3	2 June 2024
Sports Sedans	1:15.5004	Thomas Randle	Saab 9-3-Chevrolet	2 June 2024
CN	1:15.5157	Jason Makris	Wolf F1 Extreme	13 September 2026
Supercars	1:16.2224	Shane van Gisbergen	Holden ZB Commodore	26 September 2020
Formula 4	1:17.6540	Marco Manson	Tatuus F4-T421	18 July 2026
Porsche Carrera Cup	1:17.7675	Harri Jones	Porsche 911 (992 I) GT3 Cup	12 September 2026
Trans-Am Australia	1:20.6785	Jordan Boys	Ford Mustang Trans-Am	2 June 2024
GT4	1:21.7144	Jason Yu	McLaren Artura GT4	2 June 2024
TCR Touring Car	1:22.7478	Josh Buchan	Hyundai Elantra N TCR	2 June 2024
Touring Car Masters	1:24.3406	Steve Johnson	Ford Mustang Trans-Am	13 September 2026
Production Cars	1:26.3355	Grant Sherrin	BMW M4 (F82)	1 June 2024
Improved Production Cars	1:26.5584	Scott Cook	Nissan Silvia S13	16 May 2021
Aussie Racing Cars	1:28.5636	Diesel Thomas	Chevrolet Camaro	13 September 2026
