= AU4 Australian Championship =

Formula 4 championship held in Australia

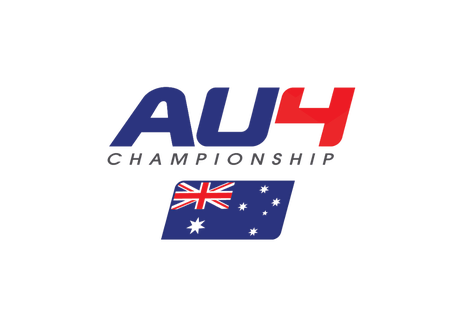
- Category: FIA Formula 4
- Country: Australia
- Region: Oceania
- Inaugural season: 2015
- Constructors: Mygale (2015–2019, 2025–present); Tatuus (2024–present)
- Engine suppliers: Ford (2015–2019, 2025–present); Stellantis FIRE (2024–present)
- Tyre suppliers: Hankook (2015–2019, 2026); Giti (2024–2025)
- Drivers' champion: (Australia) Noah Killion
- Teams' champion: (Australia) AGI Sport
- Official website: https://au4-championship.com.au/

AU4 Australian Championship (formerly known as the Formula 4 Australian Championship) is an Australian motor racing series for open-wheel cars complying with FIA Formula 4 regulations. The inaugural championship, known as the CAMS Jayco Australian Formula 4 Championship, was organised from 2015 to 2019. The series was revived by a new promoter in 2024, and renamed after another change of promoter in 2025.

Formula 4 was developed and certified by the FIA as the first step out of karting in the FIA Global Pathway from Karting to Formula One; as such, the category is designed for junior drivers seeking a professional career in motorsport.

== History ==
In November 2013, the Confederation of Australian Motor Sport (CAMS) announced that it would introduce the FIA Formula 4 category to Australia. This was followed on 12 March 2014 by the official launch of the Australian F4 Championship. Australian F4 cars were to use the French Mygale chassis and Ford EcoBoost engine, and the series would comprise seven rounds in conjunction with V8 Supercars events. Cameron McConville was the original Category Director, with Karl Reindler as Driver Coach and Driving Standards Observer for the championship.

Australian recreational vehicle manufacturer Jayco was confirmed as the championship's naming rights sponsor in December 2014 as part of a three-year agreement from 2015 onward.

The first round was held at the Reid Park Street Circuit, Townsville on 11 July 2015. AGI Sport's Will Brown was the category's first race winner, with Team BRM's Jordan Lloyd claiming the overall round victory.

Lloyd would then go on to secure the inaugural championship and a $150,000 prize courtesy of Jayco's Road To The World initiative, which assisted Lloyd in securing a USF2000 seat in 2016. Lloyd also received a European Formula 3 test courtesy of Carlin Motorsport.

The first iteration of the Formula 4 Australia Certified by the FIA Championship

The series struggled for grid numbers from the outset. The first round had 13 cars and that grid size would not be exceeded until 2019 and then only once. The 2018 season never had more than eleven cars and all bar one round of the 2019 season had only eight cars. On the 4th of September 2019, it was announced that the series would not be contested in 2020 but there was a possibility it could continue in the future. Jack Doohan and Oscar Piastri, the two Australian racing drivers who have reached Formula One who started racing during this period, chose to race in overseas F4 championships rather than locally.

On 28 November 2023, it was confirmed that China-based Top Speed, which promotes the Formula Regional Middle East Championship, Formula Regional Asian Championship and Formula 4 championships in the Middle East and South East Asia regions, will promote the revived Formula 4 Australian Championship. The revived series will be a Southern Hemisphere autumn to winter series (May to September) as the cars will be sourced from the other series organised by Top Speed. This will allow either the Middle East or South East Asia champions to participate and gain further Superlicence points under FIA policies. Four rounds will be held in Australia, with a spring final in Malaysia.

For 2025, the championship will be promoted by AGI Sport, an Australian-based company that has run the team of multiple Australian F4 champions. The new name for the series, the AU4 Australian Championship, was announced in February 2025.

== Car ==
The original championship featured Mygale designed and built cars constructed of carbon fibre and featuring a monocoque chassis. Power is provided by a 1.6-litre turbocharged Ford EcoBoost engine.

The revived championship used the Tatuus F4-T421 chassis with the Abarth engines.

For 2025, there will be two series, one for the Mygale and one for the Tatuus, in separate categories. The Tatuus drivers will participate in the overall championship, and there will be a separate championship for Mygale cars. Unlike the United States Formula 4 and Ligier Junior Formula Championships, which are run as separate races, the two series will jointly participate in one race.

== Champions ==
=== Drivers ===
Season	Driver	Team	Races	Poles	Wins	Podium	Fast lap	Points	Margins
Formula 4 Australian Championship
2015	(Australia) Jordan Lloyd	(Australia) Team BRM	21	5	12	18	11	441	54
2016	(Australia) William Brown	(Australia) Team BRM	18	4	6	13	4	316	45
2017	(Australia) Nicholas Rowe	(Australia) AGI Sport	21	7	8	16	11	378	78
2018	(Australia) Jayden Ojeda	(Australia) AGI Sport	21	5	14	17	15	412	58
2019	(Australia) Luis Leeds	(Australia) AGI Sport	18	8	9	17	8	365	99
2024	(Australia) James Piszcyk	(Australia) AGI Sport	12	6	9	10	8	256	81
AU4 Australian Championship
2025	(Australia) Noah Killion	(Australia) AGI Sport	15	2	9	10	11	310	34

=== Rookie ===
Season	Driver	Team
2015	(Australia) William Brown	(Australia) AGI Sport
2016	(Australia) Simon Fallon	(Australia) Dream Motorsport
2017	(Australia) Ryan Suhle	(Australia) Zagame Motorsport
2018	(Australia) Lochie Hughes	(Australia) Team BRM
2019	(Australia) Luis Leeds	(Australia) Team BRM
2024	(Australia) Seth Gilmore	(Australia) AGI Sport

=== Gen 1 ===
Season	Driver	Team	Races	Poles	Wins	Podium	Fast lap	Points	Margins
2025	(Australia) Jensen Marold	(Australia) AGI Sport	12	6	12	12	11	317	39

== Circuits ==
- **Bold** denotes a circuit will be used in the 2026 season.
- **Italic** denotes a future circuit will be used in the 2027 season.

Number	Circuits	Rounds	Years
1	(New South Wales) **Sydney Motorsport Park**	9 (Note: Sydney Motorsport Park hosted 2 rounds in 2025.)	2015–2019, 2024–present
2	(South Australia) **The Bend Motorsport Park**	8 (Note: The Bend Motorsport Park hosted 2 rounds in 2019, 2024—2026.)	2019, 2024–present
3	(Victoria (state)) Phillip Island Grand Prix Circuit	7 (Note: Phillip Island Grand Prix Circuit hosted 2 rounds in 2019.)	2015–2019, 2025
4	**Queensland Raceway**	5	2015–2018, 2026
5	(Victoria (state)) Sandown Raceway	4 (Note: Sandown Raceway hosted 2 rounds in 2017.)	2015–2017
6	(Queensland) Surfers Paradise Street Circuit	3	2015–2017
7	(Victoria (state)) **Winton Motor Raceway**	3 (Note: Winton Motor Raceway hosted 2 rounds in 2018.)	2018, 2026
8	(Tasmania) Symmons Plains Raceway	2	2016, 2018
9	(Queensland) Reid Park Street Circuit	1	2015
9	(New South Wales) Homebush Street Circuit	1	2015
9	(Western Australia) Wanneroo Raceway	1	2017
9	(New Zealand) Pukekohe Park Raceway	1	2018
9	(Victoria (state)) Albert Park Circuit	1	2019
9	(Malaysia) Sepang International Circuit	1	2024
9	(United Arab Emirates) Dubai Autodrome	1	2024

== See also ==
- 2023 Australian Formula Open Series - Formula 4 class run in that series.
- 2024 Australian Formula Open - Formula 4 class run in that series.
