= 2024 Formula 4 Australian Championship =

Motorsport season

The 2024 Formula 4 Australian Championship was the sixth season of the Formula 4 Australian Championship and the first one since 2019. Top Speed was appointed as the new organizer and promoter as the series switched to the Tatuus F4-T421 car and the Abarth engine.

The series, similar to other Formula 4 series, was intended primarily as an opportunity for young drivers aspiring to a professional career in motor racing a way to compete in the first step out of karting on the FIA Global Pathway in Australia, without having to live in Europe as has been common for aspiring Australian drivers. However, unusually for Formula 4, the championship also had a masters category for older drivers.

== Teams and drivers ==
Team	No.	Driver	Class	Rounds
(Australia) Jam Motorsport	1	(Australia) John Paul Drake	M	1–3
(Australia) Jam Motorsport	22	(Australia) Sebastien Amadio		All
(Australia) Jam Motorsport	48	(Australia) Blake Purdie		1–2
(Australia) Jam Motorsport	81	(Australia) Mark Rosser	M	1
(Australia) Evans GP	3	(Macau) Tiago Rodrigues		4
(Australia) Evans GP	8	(United Kingdom) Kai Daryanani		4
(Australia) Evans GP	37	(Australia) Cooper Webster		4
(New Zealand) Formula Race Academy	7	(Australia) Mark Wilson	M	1–3
(New Zealand) Formula Race Academy	23	(Australia) Lawrence Katsidis	M	2–3
(New Zealand) Formula Race Academy	40	(Australia) Tim Boydle	M	2–3
(New Zealand) Formula Race Academy	66	(Australia) Nathan Gotch	M	1–3
(New Zealand) Formula Race Academy	77	(Australia) Nicholas Filipetto	M	1, 3
(New Zealand) Formula Race Academy	89	(Australia) Joanne Ciconte	R	1
(Australia) AGI Sport	15	(Australia) Nicolas Stati		All
(Australia) AGI Sport	24	(Australia) Seth Gilmore	R	All
(Australia) AGI Sport	29	(Australia) Imogen Radburn	R	2–4
(Australia) AGI Sport	43	(Australia) Costa Toparis		4
(Australia) AGI Sport	93	(Australia) James Piszcyk		All
(Hong Kong) BlackArts Racing	23	(India) Arjun Chheda		4
(Hong Kong) BlackArts Racing	33	(Philippines) Iñigo Anton	R	4
(Australia) Tim Macrow Racing	81	(Australia) Jayden Hamilton	R	2

Icon	Legend
G	Guest drivers ineligible for Drivers' Championship
R	Rookie Cup
M	Master Class

== Calendar ==
The schedule was originally planned to consist of 15 races over 5 rounds, and was published on 28 November 2023. The round at Queensland Raceway on 13–14 July was cancelled. It was originally replaced with a round at Dubai Autodrome on 29 November–1 December in joint with Formula Trophy UAE, but ultimately never happened without any official cancellation. No replacement was announced.

Round		Circuit	Date	Pole Position	Fastest Lap	Winning Driver	Winning Team	Secondary Class Winner	Supporting
1	R1	The Bend Motorsport Park (Tailem Bend, South Australia)	4 May	(Australia) James Piszcyk	(Australia) James Piszcyk	(Australia) James Piszcyk	(Australia) AGI Sport	R: (Australia) Seth Gilmore; M: (Australia) John Paul Drake	
1	R2	The Bend Motorsport Park (Tailem Bend, South Australia)	5 May		(Australia) James Piszcyk	(Australia) James Piszcyk	(Australia) AGI Sport	R: (Australia) Seth Gilmore; M: (Australia) Mark Rosser	
1	R3	The Bend Motorsport Park (Tailem Bend, South Australia)	5 May	(Australia) James Piszcyk	(Australia) James Piszcyk	(Australia) James Piszcyk	(Australia) AGI Sport	R: (Australia) Seth Gilmore; M: (Australia) Mark Rosser	
2	R1	The Bend Motorsport Park (Tailem Bend, South Australia)	8 June	(Australia) James Piszcyk	(Australia) Blake Purdie	(Australia) James Piszcyk	(Australia) AGI Sport	R: (Australia) Seth Gilmore; M: (Australia) John Paul Drake	Lamborghini Super Trofeo Asia; Australian Formula Open
2	R2	The Bend Motorsport Park (Tailem Bend, South Australia)	9 June		(Australia) James Piszcyk	(Australia) James Piszcyk	(Australia) AGI Sport	R: (Australia) Seth Gilmore; M: (Australia) John Paul Drake	Lamborghini Super Trofeo Asia; Australian Formula Open
2	R3	The Bend Motorsport Park (Tailem Bend, South Australia)	9 June	(Australia) James Piszcyk	(Australia) James Piszcyk	(Australia) James Piszcyk	(Australia) AGI Sport	R: (Australia) Imogen Radburn; M: (Australia) Nathan Gotch	Lamborghini Super Trofeo Asia; Australian Formula Open
3	R1	(Australia) Sydney Motorsport Park (Eastern Creek, New South Wales)	3 August	(Australia) James Piszcyk	(Australia) James Piszcyk	(Australia) James Piszcyk	(Australia) AGI Sport	R: (Australia) Imogen Radburn; M: (Australia) Nathan Gotch	
3	R2	(Australia) Sydney Motorsport Park (Eastern Creek, New South Wales)	4 August		(Australia) James Piszcyk	(Australia) James Piszcyk	(Australia) AGI Sport	R: (Australia) Imogen Radburn; M: (Australia) Nathan Gotch	
3	R3	(Australia) Sydney Motorsport Park (Eastern Creek, New South Wales)	4 August	(Australia) James Piszcyk	(Australia) James Piszcyk	(Australia) James Piszcyk	(Australia) AGI Sport	R: (Australia) Imogen Radburn; M: (Australia) Nathan Gotch	
4	R1	Sepang International Circuit (Sepang, Malaysia)	7 September	(Macau) Tiago Rodrigues	(Macau) Tiago Rodrigues	(Macau) Tiago Rodrigues	(Australia) Evans GP	R: (Philippines) Iñigo Anton; M: No starters	Thailand Super Series; Malaysia Championship Series
4	R2	Sepang International Circuit (Sepang, Malaysia)	8 September		(Macau) Tiago Rodrigues	(Australia) Cooper Webster	(Australia) Evans GP	R: (Philippines) Iñigo Anton; M: No starters	Thailand Super Series; Malaysia Championship Series
4	R3	Sepang International Circuit (Sepang, Malaysia)	8 September	(United Kingdom) Kai Daryanani	(United Kingdom) Kai Daryanani	(United Kingdom) Kai Daryanani	(Australia) Evans GP	R: (Australia) Imogen Radburn; M: No starters	Thailand Super Series; Malaysia Championship Series

== Championship standings ==
Points are awarded as follows.

Position	**1st**	**2nd**	**3rd**	**4th**	**5th**	**6th**	**7th**	**8th**	**9th**	**10th**
Points	25	18	15	12	10	8	6	4	2	1

=== Drivers' championship ===
Pos	Driver	BEN1 (Australia)			BEN2 (Australia)			SYD (Australia)			SEP (Malaysia)			Pts
Pos	Driver	R1	R2	R3	R1	R2	R3	R1	R2	R3	R1	R2	R3	Pts
1	(Australia) James Piszcyk	**1**	1	**1**	**1**	1	**1**	**1**	1	**1**	3	6	6	256
2	(Australia) Nicolas Stati	5	3	2	3	3	2	2	2	2	6	4	5	175
3	(Australia) Sebastien Amadio	4	5	4	4	4	4	3	3	4	8	7	9	124
4	(Australia) Seth Gilmore	3	4	3	5	5	6	5	5	5	9	8	8	110
5	(Australia) Blake Purdie	2	2	5	2	2	3							97
6	(Australia) Imogen Radburn				6	6	5	4	4	3	10	9	7	74
7	(Australia) Cooper Webster										2	1	3	58
8	(United Kingdom) Kai Daryanani										5	3	**1**	50
9	(Australia) Costa Toparis										4	2	2	48
10	(Australia) Nathan Gotch	Ret	9	7	8	8	7	6	6	6				46
11	(Macau) Tiago Rodrigues										**1**	10	4	38
12	(Australia) John Paul Drake	6	10	8	7	7	Ret	Ret	8	8				33
13	(Australia) Nicholas Filipetto	8	8	Ret				7	7	7				26
14	(Philippines) Iñigo Anton										7	5	Ret	16
15	(Australia) Mark Rosser	Ret	6	6										16
16	(Australia) Joanne Ciconte	7	7	9										14
17	(Australia) Mark Wilson	9	11	10	10	Ret	8	Ret	10	9				11
18	(Australia) Tim Boydle				NC	10	9	9	9	11				7
19	(Australia) Lawrence Katsidis				WD	WD	WD	8	11	10				5
20	(Australia) Jayden Hamilton				9	9	Ret							4
–	(India) Arjun Chheda										WD	WD	WD	–
Pos	Driver	R1	R2	R3	R1	R2	R3	R1	R2	R3	R1	R2	R3	Pts
Pos	Driver	BEN1 (Australia)			BEN2 (Australia)			SYD (Australia)			SEP (Malaysia)			Pts

Colour	Result
Gold	Winner
Silver	Second place
Bronze	Third place
Green	Points classification
Blue	Non-points classification
Blue	Non-classified finish (NC)
Purple	Retired, not classified (Ret)
Red	Did not qualify (DNQ)
Red	Did not pre-qualify (DNPQ)
Black	Disqualified (DSQ)
White	Did not start (DNS)
White	Withdrew (WD)
White	Race cancelled (C)
Blank	Did not practice (DNP)
Blank	Did not arrive (DNA)
Blank	Excluded (EX)

**Bold** – Pole
Italics – Fastest Lap

- † – Driver did not finish the race, but was classified as they completed over 75% of the race distance.

=== Secondary classes standings ===
Pos	Driver	BEN1 (Australia)			BEN2 (Australia)			SYD (Australia)			SEP (Malaysia)			Pts
Pos	Driver	R1	R2	R3	R1	R2	R3	R1	R2	R3	R1	R2	R3	Pts
Rookies' championship
1	(Australia) Seth Gilmore	1	1	1	1	1	2	2	2	2	2	2	2	251
2	(Australia) Imogen Radburn				2	2	1	1	1	1	3	3	1	191
3	(Australia) Joanne Ciconte	2	2	2										54
4	(Philippines) Iñigo Anton										1	1	Ret	50
5	(Australia) Jayden Hamilton				3	3	Ret							30
Master Class
1	(Australia) Nathan Gotch	Ret	3	2	2	2	1	1	1	1				169
2	(Australia) John Paul Drake	1	4	3	1	1	Ret	Ret	3	3				132
3	(Australia) Mark Wilson	3	5	4	3	Ret	2	Ret	5	4				92
4	(Australia) Nicholas Filipetto	2	2	Ret				2	2	2				90
5	(Australia) Tim Boydle				NC	3	3	4	4	6				62
6	(Australia) Mark Rosser	Ret	1	1										50
7	(Australia) Lawrence Katsidis				WD	WD	WD	3	6	5				33
Pos	Driver	R1	R2	R3	R1	R2	R3	R1	R2	R3	R1	R2	R3	Pts
Pos	Driver	BEN1 (Australia)			BEN2 (Australia)			SYD (Australia)			SEP (Malaysia)			Pts

== Notes ==
- 2024 Australian Formula Open - Formula 4 class run in that series.
