= 2018 Australian Formula 4 Championship =

Motor racing competition

The 2018 CAMS Australian Formula 4 Championship (initially known for sponsorship purposes as the CAMS Jayco Australian Formula 4 Championship and later as the CAMS Payce Australian Formula 4 Championship) was the fourth Australian Formula 4 Championship, a motor racing competition for open-wheel racing cars complying with Formula 4 regulations, which were created by the Fédération Internationale de l'Automobile (FIA) for entry-level open-wheel championships. Teams and drivers competed in twenty-one races at six venues, starting on 7 April and ending on 4 November.

The championship was won by Jayden Ojeda.

== Entries ==
The following drivers contested the championship. The following Australian-registered teams and drivers contested the championship.

Team	No	Drivers	Rounds
AGI Sport	5	(Australia) Ryan Suhle	All
AGI Sport	31	(Australia) Jayden Ojeda	All
AGI Sport	50	(Australia) Ardie Jonic	2–7
Patrizicorse	11	(Australia) Jackson Walls	All
Team BRM	12	(Australia) Josh Smith	All
Team BRM	15	(Australia) Lochie Hughes	All
Team BRM	16	(Australia) Tommy Smith	All
Team BRM	27	(Australia) Zayd Tones	All
Team BRM	73	(Australia) Cameron Shields	1–5
Team BRM	78	(Australia) Aaron Love	All
Astuti Motorsport	38	(Australia) Antonio Astuti	1–2, 4–7

Each entry utilised a Mygale M14-F4 chassis and a Ford engine.

== Calendar ==
The 2018 championship was held across seven rounds in Australia and New Zealand, supporting the Supercars Championship and the Shannons Nationals.

Round		Circuit	Date	Pole position	Fastest lap	Winning driver	Winning team
1	R1	(Australia) Symmons Plains Raceway (Launceston, Tasmania)	7 April	(Australia) Cameron Shields	(Australia) Cameron Shields	(Australia) Cameron Shields	Team BRM
1	R2	(Australia) Symmons Plains Raceway (Launceston, Tasmania)	8 April		(Australia) Cameron Shields	(Australia) Ryan Suhle	AGI Sport
1	R3	(Australia) Symmons Plains Raceway (Launceston, Tasmania)	8 April	(Australia) Cameron Shields	(Australia) Jayden Ojeda	(Australia) Cameron Shields	Team BRM
2	R4	(Australia) Phillip Island Grand Prix Circuit (Phillip Island, Victoria)	2 June	(Australia) Jayden Ojeda	(Australia) Jayden Ojeda	(Australia) Jayden Ojeda	AGI Sport
2	R5	(Australia) Phillip Island Grand Prix Circuit (Phillip Island, Victoria)	3 June		(Australia) Jayden Ojeda	(Australia) Jayden Ojeda	AGI Sport
2	R6	(Australia) Phillip Island Grand Prix Circuit (Phillip Island, Victoria)	3 June	(Australia) Jayden Ojeda	(Australia) Jayden Ojeda	(Australia) Jayden Ojeda	AGI Sport
3	R7	(Australia) Queensland Raceway (Ipswich, Queensland)	21 July	(Australia) Jayden Ojeda	(Australia) Jayden Ojeda	(Australia) Jayden Ojeda	AGI Sport
3	R8	(Australia) Queensland Raceway (Ipswich, Queensland)	22 July		(Australia) Jayden Ojeda	(Australia) Jayden Ojeda	AGI Sport
3	R9	(Australia) Queensland Raceway (Ipswich, Queensland)	22 July	(Australia) Jayden Ojeda	(Australia) Jayden Ojeda	(Australia) Jayden Ojeda	AGI Sport
4	R10	(Australia) Winton Motor Raceway (Winton, Victoria)	1 September	(Australia) Ryan Suhle	(Australia) Ryan Suhle	(Australia) Ryan Suhle	AGI Sport
4	R11	(Australia) Winton Motor Raceway (Winton, Victoria)	1 September		(Australia) Lochie Hughes	(Australia) Lochie Hughes	Team BRM
4	R12	(Australia) Winton Motor Raceway (Winton, Victoria)	1 September	(Australia) Ryan Suhle	(Australia) Jayden Ojeda	(Australia) Jayden Ojeda	AGI Sport
5	R13	(Australia) Winton Motor Raceway (Winton, Victoria)	2 September	(Australia) Cameron Shields	(Australia) Jayden Ojeda	(Australia) Jayden Ojeda	AGI Sport
5	R14	(Australia) Winton Motor Raceway (Winton, Victoria)	2 September		(Australia) Jayden Ojeda	(Australia) Aaron Love	Team BRM
5	R15	(Australia) Winton Motor Raceway (Winton, Victoria)	2 September	(Australia) Cameron Shields	(Australia) Jayden Ojeda	(Australia) Jayden Ojeda	AGI Sport
6	R16	(Australia) Sydney Motorsport Park (Eastern Creek, New South Wales)	22 September	(Australia) Ryan Suhle	(Australia) Jayden Ojeda	(Australia) Jayden Ojeda	AGI Sport
6	R17	(Australia) Sydney Motorsport Park (Eastern Creek, New South Wales)	23 September		(Australia) Ryan Suhle	(Australia) Jayden Ojeda	AGI Sport
6	R18	(Australia) Sydney Motorsport Park (Eastern Creek, New South Wales)	23 September	(Australia) Ryan Suhle	(Australia) Jayden Ojeda	(Australia) Jayden Ojeda	AGI Sport
7	R19	(New Zealand) Pukekohe Park Raceway (Pukekohe, Auckland Region)	3 November	(Australia) Ryan Suhle	(Australia) Jayden Ojeda	(Australia) Ryan Suhle	AGI Sport
7	R20	(New Zealand) Pukekohe Park Raceway (Pukekohe, Auckland Region)	4 November		(Australia) Jayden Ojeda	(Australia) Jayden Ojeda	AGI Sport
7	R21	(New Zealand) Pukekohe Park Raceway (Pukekohe, Auckland Region)	4 November	(Australia) Jayden Ojeda	(Australia) Ryan Suhle	(Australia) Jayden Ojeda	AGI Sport

=== Calendar changes ===
- The championship visited New Zealand for the first time, with the final round of the championship to be held at Pukekohe Park Raceway.
- The championship made its debut at Winton Motor Raceway.
- The championship returned to Symmons Plains Raceway after a one-year absence.
- The Sandown, Barbagallo and Surfers Paradise rounds were discontinued.

== Points system ==
Championship points were awarded in each race as follows:

Position	1st	2nd	3rd	4th	5th	6th	7th	8th	9th	10th
Points	25	18	15	12	10	8	6	4	2	1

== Championship standings ==
Pos	Driver	SYM			PHI			QLD			WIN1			WIN2			SYD			PUK			Points
1	(Australia) Jayden Ojeda	4	Ret	3	**1**	1	**1**	**1**	1	**1**	Ret	9	1	1	3	1	1	1	1	2	1	**1**	412
2	(Australia) Ryan Suhle	2	1	2	4	4	2	4	2	4	**1**	3	**2**	2	4	3	**3**	4	**2**	**1**	2	2	354
3	(Australia) Aaron Love	3	3	4	3	3	3	3	3	3	3	6	3	5	1	4	2	2	3	3	4	4	307
4	(Australia) Cameron Shields	**1**	2	**1**	2	2	Ret	2	4	2	2	2	4	**7**	2	**2**							242
5	(Australia) Lochie Hughes	5	4	7	5	5	5	5	5	6	4	1	5	4	Ret	5	4	5	4	5	3	5	224
6	(Australia) Jackson Walls	7	6	8	7	Ret	4	7	8	5	6	4	9	3	9	10	5	3	Ret	9	5	3	148
7	(Australia) Zayd Tones	6	5	6	6	6	6	6	6	7	7	Ret	10	9	5	7	7	6	5	6	8	9	137
8	(Australia) Tommy Smith	9	8	5	11	8	7	10	9	9	8	7	7	8	7	9	6	9	8	4	6	6	99
9	(Australia) Josh Smith	8	7	10	9	10	8	8	7	8	5	Ret	6	11	8	6	8	8	6	10	10	7	86
10	(Australia) Antonio Astuti	10	9	9	8	7	9				9	5	8	6	6	8	10	7	9	8	9	8	72
11	(Australia) Ardie Jonic				10	9	10	9	10	10	10	8	11	10	Ret	Ret	9	Ret	7	7	7	10	35
Pos	Driver	SYM			PHI			QLD			WIN1			WIN2			SYD			PUK			Points

Colour	Result
Gold	Winner
Silver	Second place
Bronze	Third place
Green	Points classification
Blue	Non-points classification
Blue	Non-classified finish (NC)
Purple	Retired, not classified (Ret)
Red	Did not qualify (DNQ)
Red	Did not pre-qualify (DNPQ)
Black	Disqualified (DSQ)
White	Did not start (DNS)
White	Withdrew (WD)
White	Race cancelled (C)
Blank	Did not practice (DNP)
Blank	Did not arrive (DNA)
Blank	Excluded (EX)

Bold – Pole
Italics – Fastest lap
† — Did not finish, but classified
