= 2016 Australian Formula Ford Series =

Motor racing competition

Seasons
- ← 2015 2017 →

The 2016 Australian Formula Ford Series was an Australian motor racing series open to Formula Ford and Formula Ford 1600.

The first four rounds were sanctioned by the Confederation of Australian Motor Sport (CAMS), whereas the latter two rounds were sanctioned by the Australian Auto Sport Alliance (AASA).

== Team and drivers ==
Team	Car	No.	Driver	Rounds
DYFA Projects	Van Diemen RF04	1	(Australia) Dylan Fahey	3
Sonic Motor Racing Services; TanderSport	Mygale SJ10A	2	(Australia) Max Vidau	1–2, 6
Sonic Motor Racing Services; TanderSport	Mygale SJ1019	2	(Australia) Max Vidau	4
Sonic Motor Racing Services; TanderSport	Mygale SJ011	3	(Australia) Courtney Prince	5–6
Sonic Motor Racing Services; TanderSport	Mygale SJ12	4	(Australia) James Westaway	6
Sonic Motor Racing Services; TanderSport	Mygale SJ10A	42	(Australia) Leanne Tander	1–3, 5–6
Sonic Motor Racing Services; TanderSport	Mygale SJ010	42	(Australia) Leanne Tander	4
Anglo Australian Motorsport	Spirit WL11	3	(Australia) Aaron Grech	2, 4
Anglo Australian Motorsport	Spectrum 010B	31	(Australia) Simon Hodges	2, 4
Anglo Australian Motorsport	Mygale SJ08	41	(Australia) Dan Holihan	2, 4
jamescorbettart.com	Spectrum 014B	3	(Australia) James Corbett	3
3 Amigos Racing	Mondiale	4	(Australia) Robert Rowe	2
Keith Brennan	Spirit K08	4	(Australia) Keith Brennan	4
Aaron Cameron	Spectrum 014	5	(Australia) Aaron Cameron	1, 3
Esteel (AUST) Pty Ltd,	Spectrum 012	6	(Australia) Paul Zsidy	1, 3–6
Borland Racing Developments	Spectrum 014	6	(Australia) Paul Zsidy	2
Borland Racing Developments	Spectrum 014	30	(Australia) Jayden Ojeda	All
Eximm / ToruaNetworks	Mygale SJ069	7	(New Zealand) Hunter McElrea	1, 3–4
Eximm / ToruaNetworks	Mygale SJ069	77	(New Zealand) Hunter McElrea	2
Plus Fitness Racing	Spectrum 011B	7	(Australia) Chris Lazarevic	2
Plus Fitness Racing	Spectrum 0116	7	(Australia) Chris Lazarevic	6
Jordan Boys Motorsport	Mygale SJ11A	8	(Australia) Jordan Boys	All
Purtek Motorsport	Spectrum 010	9	(Australia) Chris Purvis	3
Zane Morse	Mygale SJ2011A	11	(Australia) Zane Morse	4
Synergy Motorsport	Spectrum 012	12	(Australia) Andrew Kahl	All
Synergy Motorsport	Spectrum 014	20	(Australia) Anthony Colombrita	2
Synergy Motorsport	Spectrum 014	20	(Australia) Ryan Suhle	3–6
Synergy Motorsport	Spectrum 014	44	(Australia) Jett Bennett	2, 4
Synergy Motorsport	Spectrum 014	96	(Australia) Ryan Pike	2
Fastlane Racing	Stealth S3	13	(Australia) Homan Ho	1
Fastlane Racing	Spectrum 014	14	(Australia) Peter Major	1
Fastlane Racing	Stealth S3-002	72	(Australia) Samuel Dicker	6
Doria Bros Transport	Mygale SJ11	15	(Australia) John Doria	6
Dream Motorsport	Mygale Formula Ford	16	(Australia) Cooper Murray	5–6
Lachlan Gibbons Motorsport	Mygale SJ07	18	(Australia) Lachlan Gibbons	All
Jones Motorsport	Spectrum 014D	21	(Australia) Harri Jones	3, 5–6
Karla Curtis	Van Diemen	25	(Australia) Karla Curtis	3
Ian Gough	Spectrum 10	29	(Australia) Ian Gough	4
MNM Motorsport	Van Diemen	32	(Australia) Mitchell Maddren	3
Jake Donaldson Racing/Listec Race Cars	Listec WIL 013	35	(Australia) Jake Donaldson	2, 4
Ultimate Power Steering	Vector TF94	36	(Australia) Gary Goulding	3
Ellery Motorsport	Spectrum 010	44	(Australia) Scott Andrews	5
Wilson Security/Frontier; Parkinson Group	Spectrum 011C	48	(Australia) Nicholas Carroll	s1, 5–6
Wilson Security/Frontier; Parkinson Group	Spectrum 011C	95	(Australia) Adrian Lazzaro	3–6
Listec Race Cars	Listec WIL-05	53	(Australia) Mark Lowing	2
Dependable Sheds	Mygale	73	(Australia) Cameron Shields	4
Donate Life	Swift 93F	s80	(Australia) Jason Liddell	2, 4
BF Racing	Van Diemen	80	(Australia) Sam Sewell	3
BF Racing	Mygale SJ12A	99	(Australia) Will Brown	2–6
Reichstein Motorsport	Mygale SJ15	85	(Australia) Ben Reichstein	1–2, 5
Reichstein Motorsport	Spectrum 012B	85	(Australia) Ben Reichstein	6
Cadohaven Drainage P/L	Van Diemen RF91	86	(Australia) Shane Baumer	2, 4
Lucas Filkotzias	Mygale	90	(Australia) Lucas Filkotzias	1
Robert Power	Mygale SJ08A	92	(Australia) Robert Power	3
Thomas Corbett	Van Diemen	93	(Australia) Thomas Corbett	3
Hobbs Motorsport	Comtec Spirit K08	94	(Australia) Jake Hobbs	1–5
Lazzaaro Motorsport	Spectrum 014	95	(Australia) Adrian Lazzaro	1–2
Jimbaran Engineering P/L	Spectrum	96	(Australia) Ryan Pike	3
Liam McLeelan	Mygale SJ13	97	(Australia) Liam McLeelan	1, 6
John Connelly	Comtec Spirit K08	99	(Australia) John Connelly	1

== Race calendar ==
The series is being contested over six rounds with three races at each round. All races were held in Australia.

Round	Circuit	City / state	Date	Winning driver(s)
1	Sandown Raceway	Melbourne, Victoria	1–3 April	Leanne Tander
2	Sydney Motorsport Park	Sydney, New South Wales	28–29 May	Will Brown
3	Queensland Raceway	Ipswich, Queensland	29–31 July	Will Brown
4	Wakefield Park	Goulburn, New South Wales	20–21 August	Leanne Tander
5	Winton Motor Raceway	Winton, Victoria	24–25 September	Jordan Boys
6	Phillip Island Grand Prix Circuit	Phillip Island, Victoria	26–27 November	Will Brown

== Results and standings ==
=== Results ===
Rd	Race	Circuit	Pole position	Fastest lap	Winning driver	Winning team
1	1	(Victoria (state)) Sandown Raceway	(Australia) Jayden Ojeda	(Australia) Jayden Ojeda	(Australia) Leanne Tander	Sonic Motor Racing Services
1	2	(Victoria (state)) Sandown Raceway		(Australia) Andrew Kahl	(Australia) Jayden Ojeda	Borland Racing Developments
1	3	(Victoria (state)) Sandown Raceway		(Australia) Jayden Ojeda	(Australia) Leanne Tander	Sonic Motor Racing Services
2	1	(New South Wales) Sydney Motorsport Park	(Australia) Jordan Boys	(Australia) Jayden Ojeda	(Australia) Will Brown	BF Racing
2	2	(New South Wales) Sydney Motorsport Park		(Australia) Andrew Kahl	(Australia) Will Brown	BF Racing
2	3	(New South Wales) Sydney Motorsport Park		(Australia) Will Brown	(Australia) Will Brown	BF Racing
3	1	Queensland Raceway	(Australia) Will Brown	(Australia) Will Brown	(Australia) Leanne Tander	Sonic Motor Racing Services
3	2	Queensland Raceway		(Australia) Will Brown	(Australia) Will Brown	BF Racing
3	3	Queensland Raceway		(Australia) Will Brown	(Australia) Will Brown	BF Racing
4	1	(New South Wales) Wakefield Park Raceway	(Australia) Jayden Ojeda	(Australia) Lachlan Gibbons	(Australia) Jayden Ojeda	Borland Racing Developments
4	2	(New South Wales) Wakefield Park Raceway		(Australia) Will Brown	(Australia) Will Brown	BF Racing
4	3	(New South Wales) Wakefield Park Raceway		(Australia) Andrew Kahl	(Australia) Leanne Tander	Sonic Motor Racing Services
5	1	(Victoria (state)) Winton Motor Raceway	(Australia) Jayden Ojeda	(Australia) Will Brown	(Australia) Jordan Boys	Jordan Boys Motorsport
5	2	(Victoria (state)) Winton Motor Raceway		(Australia) Cooper Murray	(Australia) Jordan Boys	Jordan Boys Motorsport
5	3	(Victoria (state)) Winton Motor Raceway		(Australia) Jayden Ojeda	(Australia) Leanne Tander	Sonic Motor Racing Services
6	1	(Victoria (state)) Phillip Island Grand Prix Circuit	(Australia) Will Brown	(Australia) Leanne Tander	(Australia) Will Brown	BF Racing
6	2	(Victoria (state)) Phillip Island Grand Prix Circuit		(Australia) Jamie Westaway	(Australia) Will Brown	BF Racing
6	3	(Victoria (state)) Phillip Island Grand Prix Circuit		(Australia) Jordan Boys	(Australia) Will Brown	BF Racing

=== Standings ===
Pos.	Driver	(Victoria (state)) SAN			(New South Wales) SMP			(Queensland) QLD			(New South Wales) WAK			(Victoria (state)) WIN			(Victoria (state)) PHI			Pts.
Pos.	Driver	R1	R2	R3	R1	R2	R3	R1	R2	R3	R1	R2	R3	R1	R2	R3	R1	R2	R3	Pts.
1	(Australia) Leanne Tander	1	2	1	12	5	2	1	4	4	2	2	1	12	2	1	5	2	3	267
2	(Australia) Will Brown				1	1	1	3	1	1	6	1	8	2	3	5	1	1	1	255
3	(Australia) Jordan Boys	4	6	4	3	6	11	5	Ret	3	10	4	6	1	1	2	3	3	5	214
4	(Australia) Jayden Ojeda	2	1	2	4	3	3	Ret	Ret	Ret	1	3	3	Ret	4	3	4	13	6	193
5	(Australia) Adrian Lazzaro	3	11	3	5	9	7	6	5	2	12	8	7	3	9	6	9	8	4	176
6	(Australia) Lachlan Gibbons	5	4	8	7	7	5	10	10	8	3	5	21	5	11	11	14	11	12	139
7	(Australia) Andrew Kahl	10	Ret	5	8	2	Ret	2	2	Ret	11	7	2	4	Ret	Ret	Ret	10	10	127
8	(Australia) Max Vidau	6	3	7	6	14	6				5	13	4				7	6	8	111
9	(New Zealand) Hunter McElrea	9	10	11	10	11	12	9	8	7	8	14	10							78
10	(Australia) Ryan Suhle							11	9	9	9	10	9	8	8	7	13	12	11	76
11	(Australia) Harri Jones							8	6	6				7	10	9	10	9	9	70
12	(Australia) Ryan Pike				2	4	4	4	3	Ret										66
13	(Australia) Cooper Murray													Ret	5	4	6	4	2	61
14	(Australia) Ben Reichstein	Ret	5	17	17	8	8							6	6	14	17	17	14	56
15	(Australia) Liam McLellan	8	Ret	9													2	5	7	51
16	(Australia) Nicholas Carroll	12	9	10										9	7	8	11	20	15	47
17	(Australia) Paul Zsidy	DNS	13	15	18	15	14	12	11	10	16	15	14	Ret	12	12	19	19	18	44
18	(Australia) Aaron Cameron	Ret	DNS	6				7	7	5										39
19	(Australia) Cameron Shields										4	6	5							33
20	(Australia) Jett Bennett				11	12	13				14	12	13							28
21	(Australia) Peter Major	7	8	12																21
22	(Australia) Zane Morse																			21
23	(Australia) Courtney Prince													10	15	10	15	14	19	18
24	(Australia) Lucas Filkotzias	11	7	13																17
25	(Australia) Jamie Westaway																8	7	17	17
26	(Australia) Homan Ho	13	12	14																9
27	(Australia) Sam Dicker																12	18	13	7
28	(Australia) Chris Lazarevic																18	15	16	1
29	(Australia) Luke Ellery																DNS	DNS	DNS	0
30	(Australia) John Doria																16	16	Ret	0
Pos.	Driver	(Victoria (state)) SAN			(New South Wales) SMP			(Queensland) QLD			(New South Wales) WAK			(Victoria (state)) WIN			(Victoria (state)) PHI			Pts.
Pos.	Driver	R1	R2	R3	R1	R2	R3	R1	R2	R3	R1	R2	R3	R1	R2	R3	R1	R2	R3	Pts.

Formula Ford 1600 (Kent) Series

Pos.	Driver	(Victoria (state)) SAN			(New South Wales) SMP			(Queensland) QLD			(New South Wales) WAK			(Victoria (state)) WIN			(Victoria (state)) PHI			Pts.
Pos.	Driver	R1	R2	R3	R1	R2	R3	R1	R2	R3	R1	R2	R3	R1	R2	R3	R1	R2	R3	Pts.
1	(Australia) Jake Hobbs	15	14	16	14	19	17	16	18	16	18	18	Ret	11	14	Ret	21	21	21	273
2	(Australia) Dan Holihan				21	21	18				21	20	18				22	23	22	136
3	(Australia) Jason Liddell				20	22	Ret				23	23	20							82
4	(Australia) Brendan Jones																20	22	20	56
5	(Australia) Ian Gough										15	22	16							54
6	(Australia) James Corbett							13	13	15										47
7	(Australia) Tony Chapman							15	15	12										42
8	(Australia) Bob Power							14	16	13										41
9	(Australia) Scott Andrews													Ret	13	13				41
10	(Australia) John Blanchard																23	24	23	36
11	(Australia) Chris Purvis							19	17	14										31
12	(Australia) Mitch Maddren							Ret	12	11										30
13	(Australia) Gary Goulding							20	20	17										24
14	(Australia) John Connelly	14	Ret	DNS																21
15	(Australia) Dave Boulton																			19
16	(Australia) Sam Sewell							DNS	14	Ret										14
17	(Australia) Karla Curtis							18	Ret	DNS										10
18	(Australia) Tom Corbett							Ret	Ret	DNS										1
19	(Australia) Dylan Fahey							DNS	DNS	DNS										0
Pos.	Driver	(Victoria (state)) SAN			(New South Wales) SMP			(Queensland) QLD			(New South Wales) WAK			(Victoria (state)) WIN			(Victoria (state)) PHI			Pts.
Pos.	Driver	R1	R2	R3	R1	R2	R3	R1	R2	R3	R1	R2	R3	R1	R2	R3	R1	R2	R3	Pts.

NOTE: Because of age restrictions, Will Brown, who finished second, claimed the Andersen Promotions Road to Indy Shootout prize.
