= Jayden Ojeda =

Australian racing driver (born 1999)

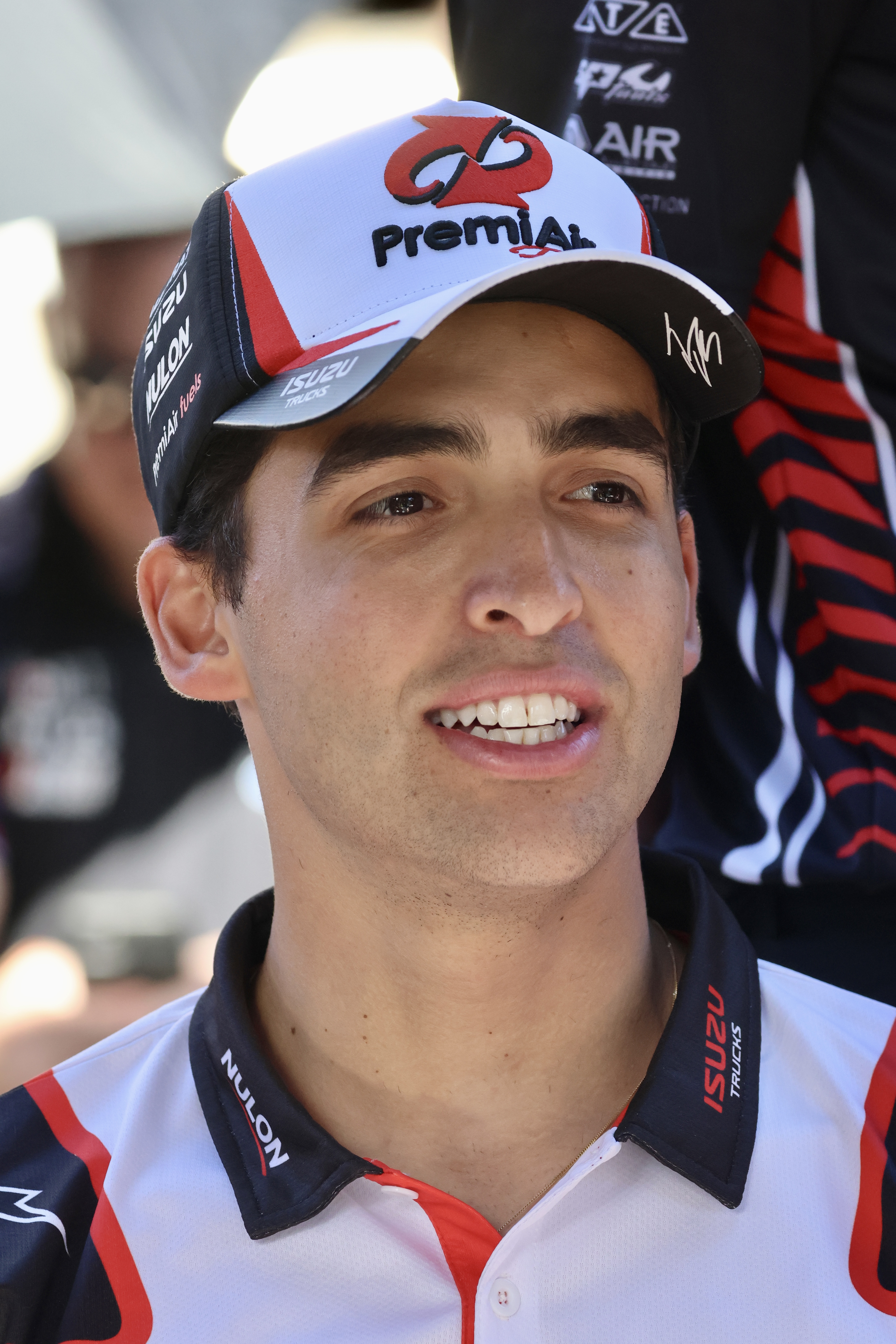
- Ojeda at the Adelaide Street Circuit in 2025
- Nationality: Australian
- Born: Jayden Gabriel Ojeda; 31 July 1999 (age 27) Sydney, Australia

Supercars Championship career
- Debut season: 2020
- Current team: PremiAir Racing
- Categorisation: FIA Silver (until 2024); FIA Gold (2025–)
- Car number: 31
- Former teams: Garry Rogers Motorsport; Matt Stone Racing; Walkinshaw Andretti United; Erebus Motorsport
- Starts: 45
- Wins: 0
- Podiums: 0
- Poles: 0

Previous series
- 2015,16,17 2019 2020-21 2020,21,22: Australian Formula Ford Series; Kumho Tyre Super3 Series; Super2 Series; Supercars Championship

Championship titles
- 2018: Australian Formula 4 Championship

Jayden Gabriel "Juice" Ojeda (born 31 July 1999) is an Australian racing driver from Sydney, Australia. He is currently competing in the GT World Challenge Australia series, driving a Mercedes-AMG GT3 Evo for Tigani Motorsport, along with appearances in the Supercars Championship as well as other GT World Challenge events outside Australia.

== Racing record ==
=== Karting career summary ===
Season	Series	Position
2009	Brian Farley Memorial - Midgets	**1st**
2011	New South Wales Kart Titles - Rookies	**2nd**
2011	Yellowtail Cup - Rookies	**1st**
2013	Australian National Kart Championships - Junior National Light	**3rd**
2013	Australian National Kart Championships - Junior National Heavy	8th
2014	Australian National Kart Championships - Junior National Light	**3rd**
2014	Australian National Kart Championships - Junior National Heavy	7th
2014	RMC Grand Finals - Junior Max	64th

=== Racing career summary ===
Season	Series	Team	Races	Wins	Poles	F/laps	Podiums	Points	Position
2015	Victorian Formula Ford Championship	Borland Racing Developments	9	1	2	3	3	164	5th
2015	Australian Formula Ford Series	Borland Racing Developments	3	0	0	0	1	34	19th
2016	Victorian Formula Ford Championship	Borland Racing Developments	3	0	0	0	1	72	11th
2016	Australian Formula Ford Series	Borland Racing Developments	18	2	3	4	9	193	4th
2017	Victorian Formula Ford Championship	Borland Racing Developments	6	2	0	2	4	163	9th
2017	Australian Formula Ford Series	Borland Racing Developments	17	2	3	0	8	195	**3rd**
2017	New South Wales Formula Ford Championship	Borland Racing Developments	8	0	1	2	6	?	?
2018	Australian Formula 4 Championship	AGI Sport	21	14	2	15	17	412	**1st**
2019	Super3 Series	Anderson Motorsport	15	4	0	4	6	538	**2nd**
2019	Australian Formula 4 Championship	AGI Sport	3	1	1	2	0	35	9th
2020	Super2 Series	MW Motorsport	7	0	0	0	3	615	4th
2020	Supercars Championship	Garry Rogers Motorsport	1	0	0	0	0	96	45th
2021	Super2 Series	MW Motorsport	9	0	2	1	5	969	**3rd**
2021	Supercars Championship	Matt Stone Racing	1	0	0	0	0	0	NC
2021	Australian FF1600 Championship	Anglo Motor Sport	3	0	0	1	3	?	?
2022	Supercars Championship	Walkinshaw Andretti United	6	0	0	0	0	240	32nd
2022	Supercars Championship	Matt Stone Racing	1	0	0	0	0	240	32nd
2023	GT World Challenge Australia - Pro-Am	Harrolds Volante Rosso Motorsport	10	1	1	0	2	107	5th
2023	Supercars Championship	Matt Stone Racing	2	0	0	0	0	282	38th
2023	Toyota Gazoo Racing Australia 86 Series	Toyota Gazoo Racing Australia	3	1	1	0	1	214	?
2023	Australian Formula Open Series	AGI Sport	0	0	0	0	0	0	NC
2023-24	Asian Le Mans Series - GT	Craft-Bamboo Racing	2	0	1	0	0	5	27th
2024	GT World Challenge Australia - Pro-Am	Realta Tigani Motorsport	10	0	1	2	2	75	7th
2024	Super Taikyu - ST-X	Craft-Bamboo Racing	6	2	2	1	4	130‡	**2nd‡**
2024	GT World Challenge Asia	Craft-Bamboo Racing	2	0	0	?	0	0	NC
2024	Intercontinental GT Challenge	Mercedes-AMG Team Craft-Bamboo Racing	2	0	0	0	0	NC	0
2024	Supercars Championship	Erebus Motorsport	2	0	0	0	0	270	36th
2024	GT World Challenge America - Pro-Am	SunEnergy1 Racing	1	0	0	0	0	0	NC†
2025	GT World Challenge Australia - Pro-Am	Realta Tigani Motorsport	12	1	1	0	5	154	**3rd**
2025	GT World Challenge Asia	Craft-Bamboo Racing	10	0	2	0	2	54	14th
2025	Super Taikyu - ST-X	Craft-Bamboo Racing	1	0	0	0	0	38.5‡	6th‡
2025	Intercontinental GT Challenge	Mercedes-AMG Team Craft-Bamboo Racing	1	0	1	0	0	10	26th
2025	Supercars Championship	Walkinshaw Andretti United	2	0	0	0	0	400	25th
2025	Supercars Championship	PremiAir Racing	5	0	0	0	0	400	25th
2025	Gulf 12 Hours - Pro-Am	Geyer Valmont Racing/Tigani Motors	1	1	1	0	1	N/A	**1st**
2026	GT World Challenge Australia - Pro-Am	Move My Wheels by Tigani Motorsport	10	2	2	2	3	106	4th
2026	Super Taikyu - ST-X	Craft-Bamboo Racing	1	0	0	1	1	113‡	**3rd‡**
2026	GT World Challenge Europe Endurance Cup	GetSpeed Team Dubai	1	0	0	0	0	0	NC

‡ Team score

=== Complete Australian Formula 4 Championship results ===
(key) (Races in bold indicate pole position) (Races in italics indicate fastest lap)

Year	Team	1	2	3	4	5	6	7	8	9	10	11	12	13	14	15	16	17	18	19	20	21	DC	Points
2018	AGI Sport	SYM; 1; 4	SYM; 2 Ret	SYM; 3; 3	**PHI**; **1**; 1	PHI; 2; 1	**PHI**; **3**; 1	**QLD**; **1**; 1	QLD; 2; 1	**QLD**; **3**; 1	WIN1; 1 Ret	WIN1; 2; 9	WIN1; 3; 1	WIN2; 1; 1	WIN2; 2; 3	WIN2; 3; 1	SYD; 1; 1	SYD; 2; 1	SYD; 3; 1	PUK; 1; 2	PUK; 2; 1	**PUK**; **3**; 1	1st	412
2019	AGI Sport	MEL; 1; 5	MEL; 2 Ret	**MEL**; **3**; 1	SYD; 1	SYD; 2	SYD; 3	PHI1; 1	PHI1; 2	PHI1; 3	PHI2; 1	PHI2; 2	PHI2; 3	BEN1; 1	BEN1; 2	BEN1; 3	BEN2; 1	BEN2; 2	BEN2; 2				9th	35

=== Super3 Series results ===
(key) (Race results only)

Super3 Series results
Year	Team	No.	Car	1	2	3	4	5	6	7	8	9	10	11	12	13	14	15	Position	Points
2019	Anderson Motorsport	11	Ford FG Falcon	PHI; R1; 4	PHI; R2; 5	PHI; R3; 5	WIN; R4; 4	WIN; R5; 6	WIN; R6; 1	QLD; R7; 4	QLD; R8; 2	QLD; R9; 1	BEN; R10; 1	BEN; R11; 1	BEN; R12; 4	SAN; R13; 5	SAN; R14; 4	SAN; R15; 2	2nd	538

=== Super2 Series results ===
(key) (Race results only)

Super2 Series results
Year	Team	No.	Car	1	2	3	4	5	6	7	8	9	10	Position	Points
2020	MW Motorsport	31	Nissan Altima L33	ADE; R1; 9	ADE; R2; 4	ADE; R3; 5	SYD; R4; 3	SYD; R5; 2	BAT; R6; Ret	BAT; R7; 2				4th	615
2021	MW Motorsport	31	Nissan Altima L33	BAT; R1; 5	**BAT**; **R2**; **7**	TOW1; R3; 2	TOW1; R4; 3	TOW2; R5; 2	TOW2; R6; 3	**SMP**; **R7**; **8**	SMP; R8; C	BAT; R9; 2	BAT; R10; Ret	3rd	969

=== Supercars Championship results ===
Supercars results
Year	Team	No.	Car	1	2	3	4	5	6	7	8	9	10	11	12	13	14	15	16	17	18	19	20	21	22	23	24	25	26	27	28	29	30	31	32	33	34	35	36	37	Position	Points
2020	Garry Rogers Motorsport	40	Holden ZB Commodore	ADE; R1	ADE; R2	MEL; R3	MEL; R4	MEL; R5	MEL; R6	SMP1; R7	SMP1; R8	SMP1; R9	SMP2; R10	SMP2; R11	SMP2; R12	HID1; R13	HID1; R14	HID1; R15	HID2; R16	HID2; R17	HID2; R18	TOW1; R19	TOW1; R20	TOW1; R21	TOW2; R22	TOW2; R23	TOW2; R24	BEN1; R25	BEN1; R26	BEN1; R27	BEN2; R28	BEN2; R29	BEN2; R30	BAT; R31; 19							45th	96
2021	Matt Stone Racing	35	Holden ZB Commodore	BAT1; R1	BAT1; R2	SAN; R3	SAN; R4	SAN; R5	SYM; R6	SYM; R7	SYM; R8	BEN; R9	BEN; R10	BEN; R11	HID; R12	HID; R13	HID; R14	TOW1; R15	TOW1; R16	TOW2; R17	TOW2; R18	TOW2; R19	SMP1; R20	SMP1; R21	SMP1; R22	SMP2; R23	SMP2; R24	SMP2; R25	SMP3; R26	SMP3; R27	SMP3; R28	SMP4; R29; PO	SMP4; R30; PO	BAT2; R31; Ret							N/C	0
2022	Walkinshaw Andretti United	27	Holden ZB Commodore	SMP; R1	SMP; R2	SYM; R3	SYM; R4	SYM; R5	MEL; R6	MEL; R7	MEL; R8	MEL; R9	BAR; R10	BAR; R11	BAR; R12	WIN; R13; 17	WIN; R14; 22	WIN; R15; 21	HID; R16; 17	HID; R17; 23	HID; R18; Ret	TOW; R19	TOW; R20	BEN; R21	BEN; R22	BEN; R23															32nd	240
2022	Matt Stone Racing	35	Holden ZB Commodore																								SAN; R24; PO	SAN; R25; PO	SAN; R26; PO	PUK; R27	PUK; R28	PUK; R29	BAT; R30; 20	SUR; R31	SUR; R32	NEW; R33	NEW; R34				32nd	240
2023	Matt Stone Racing	34	Chevrolet Camaro ZL1	NEW; R1	NEW; R2	MEL; R3	MEL; R4	MEL; R5	MEL; R6	BAR; R7	BAR; R8	BAR; R9	SYM; R10	SYM; R11	SYM; R12	HID; R13	HID; R14	HID; R15	TOW; R16	TOW; R17	SMP; R18	SMP; R19	BEN; R20	BEN; R21	BEN; R22	SAN; R23; 16	BAT; R24; 9	SUR; R25	SUR; R26	ADE; R27	ADE; R28										38th	282
2024	Erebus Motorsport	9	Chevrolet Camaro ZL1	BAT1; R1	BAT1; R2	MEL; R3	MEL; R4	MEL; R5	MEL; R6	TAU; R7	TAU; R8	BAR; R9	BAR; R10	HID; R11	HID; R12	TOW; R13	TOW; R14	SMP; R15	SMP; R16	BEN; R17	BEN; R18	SAN; R19; 20	BAT; R20; 8	SUR; R21	SUR; R22	ADE; R23	ADE; R24														36th	270
2025	Walkinshaw Andretti United	2	Ford Mustang GT	SYD; R1	SYD; R2	SYD; R3	MEL; R4	MEL; R5	MEL; R6	MEL; R7	TAU; R8	TAU; R9	TAU; R10	SYM; R11	SYM; R12	SYM; R13	BAR; R14	BAR; R15	BAR; R16	HID; R17	HID; R18	HID; R19	TOW; R20	TOW; R21	TOW; R22	QLD; R23	QLD; R24	QLD; R25	BEN; R26; 6	BAT; R27; Ret	SUR; R28	SUR; R29									25th	400
2025	PremiAir Racing	62	Chevrolet Camaro Mk.6																														SAN; R30; 20	SAN; R31; 18	ADE; R32; 16	ADE; R33; 20	ADE; R34; 19				25th	400
2026	PremiAir Racing	31	Chevrolet Camaro Mk.6	SMP; R1; 13	SMP; R2; 21	SMP; R3; 19	MEL; R4; 16	MEL; R5; 18	MEL; R6; 13	MEL; R7; 7	TAU; R8; 18	TAU; R9; 14	CHR; R10; 12	CHR; R11; 8	CHR; R12; 11	CHR; R13; 14	SYM; R14; 10	SYM; R15; 14	SYM; R16; 6	HID; R17; 9	HID; R18; 10	HID; R19; 13	TOW; R20; 9	TOW; R21; 11	TOW; R22; 10	BAR; R23; 20	BAR; R24; 18	BAR; R25; 8	QLD; R26; 18	QLD; R27; 24	QLD; R28	BEN; R29	BAT; R30	SUR; R31	SUR; R32	SAN; R33	SAN; R34	ADE; R35	ADE; R36	ADE; R37	14th*	994*

=== Complete Bathurst 1000 results ===
Year	Team	Car	Co-driver	Position	Laps
2020	Garry Rogers Motorsport	Holden Commodore ZB	(Australia) Tyler Everingham	19th	121
2021	Matt Stone Racing	Holden Commodore ZB	(Australia) Zane Goddard	DNF	112
2022	Matt Stone Racing	Holden Commodore ZB	(Australia) Todd Hazelwood	20th	159
2023	Matt Stone Racing	Chevrolet Camaro Mk.6	(Australia) Jack Le Brocq	9th	161
2024	Erebus Motorsport	Chevrolet Camaro Mk.6	(Australia) Jack Le Brocq	8th	161
2025	Walkinshaw Andretti United	Ford Mustang GT	(New Zealand) Ryan Wood	19th	149

=== Complete GT World Challenge Australia results ===
(key) (Races in bold indicate pole position) (Races in italics indicate fastest lap)

Year	Team	Car	Class	1	2	3	4	5	6	7	8	9	10	11	12	13	Pos.	Points
2023	Volante Rosso	Mercedes-AMG GT3 Evo	Pro-Am	BAT; R1	BAT; R2	WAN; R1; 5	WAN; R2; 5	PHI; R1; 1	**PHI**; **R2**; **4**	SMP; R1; 5	**SMP**; **R2**; **2**	QLD; R1; 5	**QLD**; **R2**; **4**	ADL; R1; Ret	ADL; R2; 5	ADL; R3; Ret	6th	117
2024	Tigani Motorsport	Mercedes-AMG GT3 Evo	Pro-Am	PHI1; 1; 7	PHI1; 2; 2	BEN; 1; 8	BEN; 2; 8	QLD; 1; 2	**QLD**; **2**; **5**	PHI2; 1 Ret	PHI2; 2 Ret	BAT; 1; 7	BAT; 2; 7				7th	75
2025	Tigani Motorsport	Mercedes-AMG GT3 Evo	Pro-Am	PHI; 1; 2	PHI; 2 Ret	SYD; 1; 3	SYD; 2; 4	QLD; 1; 2	QLD; 2; 8	SAN; 1; 4	SAN; 2; 4	BEN; 1; 5	**BEN**; **2**; **1**	HAM; 2; 8	HAM; 2; 3		3rd	154
2026	Tigani Motorsport	Mercedes-AMG GT3 Evo	Pro-Am	PHI; 1 Ret	**PHI**; **2**; **1**	BEN; 1; 7	**BEN**; **2**; **1**	QLD; 1; 7	QLD; 2; 4	HID; 1; 2	HID; 2; 11	SYD; 1; 7	SYD; 2; 9	ADL; 1	ADL; 2		4th	106

=== Complete Bathurst 6 Hour results ===
Year	Team	Co-drivers	Car	Class	Laps	Pos.	Class pos.
2019	(Australia) Secure Wealth Advisers	(Australia) Simon Hodges (Australia) Iain Slateri	BMW M135i Hatch F20	A1	126	7th	5th
2022	(Australia) Secure Wealth Advisers	(Australia) Simon Hodges	BMW M4 F82	X	64	DNF	
2023	(Australia) Secure Wealth Advisers	(Australia) Simon Hodges	BMW M4 F82	X	112	**1st**	**1st**
2024	(Australia) Secure Wealth Advisers	(Australia) Simon Hodges (Australia) George Miedecke	BMW M4 F82	X	123	**1st**	**1st**
2025	(Australia) Secure Wealth Advisers	(Australia) Simon Hodges (Australia) George Miedecke	BMW M4 F82	X	122	**2nd**	**2nd**
2026	(Australia) Secure Wealth Advisers	(Australia) Simon Hodges	BMW M4 F82	X	122	19th	5th

=== Complete Bathurst 12 Hour results ===
Year	Team	Co-drivers	Car	Class	Laps	Overall position	Class position
2024	(Hong Kong) Craft-Bamboo Racing	(Germany) Maximilian Götz (Spain) Daniel Juncadella	Mercedes-AMG GT3 Evo	Pro	233	DNF	
2025	(Hong Kong) Craft-Bamboo Racing	(Germany) Maximilian Götz (Austria) Lucas Auer	Mercedes-AMG GT3 Evo	Pro	306	5th	5th

Sporting positions
Preceded by Nick Rowe	Australian Formula 4 Championship; Champion; 2018	Succeeded by Luis Leeds
Awards and achievements
Preceded by Liam McLellan	Jon Targett Perpetual Karting Trophy; 2014	Succeeded by Reece Sidebottom
