= James Piszcyk =

Australian racing driver (born 2006)

- Nationality: (Australia) Australian
- Born: 25 August 2006 (age 20) Adelaide, South Australia, Australia

F4 British Championship career
- Debut season: 2023
- Current team: Rodin Motorsport
- Former teams: Hitech Pulse-Eight
- Starts: 60 (60 entries)
- Wins: 8
- Podiums: 14
- Poles: 6
- Fastest laps: 4
- Best finish: 2nd in 2025

Championship titles
- 2024: Formula 4 Australian Championship

James "Jimmy" Piszcyk (born 25 August 2006) is an Australian racing driver who last competed in the 2025 F4 British Championship with Rodin Motorsport, where he came runner-up to the title. He is also the winner of the 2024 Formula 4 Australian Championship.

== Career ==
=== Karting ===
Piszcyk began karting in 2014 and made his competitive debut in 2017, where he stayed in domestic Australian championships throughout his career. His best results came in 2018, where he won the Australian State Championship South Australia and came third in the Australian Kart Championship in the Cadet 12 categories.

=== Formula Ford ===
==== 2021 ====
In 2021, Piszcyk stepped up to Australian Formula Ford Championship, marking his single-seater debut with Synergy Motorsport. He also drove in Formula Ford Fiesta Victoria with Synergy Motorsport.

==== 2022 ====
For 2022, Piszcyk switched to CHE Motorsport, where he contested the Australian Formula Ford Championship for the second time. In eighteen races, he got four wins, one pole position, five fastest laps and ten podiums, where he finished the championship as runner-up. He missed out of winning the championship after skipping the final round due to attending a Formula 4 test.

Piszcyk also competed in three races of the Victoria Formula Ford Championship with CHE Racing as well. He won the Formula Ford New South Wales championship in the Duratec class and was selected to compete in the 2022 Ferrari Driver Asia–Pacific and Oceania Academy.

=== Formula 4 ===
==== 2023 ====
Piszcyk made his Formula 4 debut in the Formula 4 UAE Championship with British outfit Hitech Pulse-Eight. He scored his first points in the third race of the first round at Dubai Autodrome, where he came in eighth. At the fourth round in the Dubai Autodrome, he got finished in the points two times, first a fifth place – his highest result of the season – in the first race, and a ninth place at the third race. He retired from the second race of the final round of the season at the Yas Marina Circuit, due to a tyre issue. Piszcyk finished the drivers championship in 15th with 25 points.

Piszcyk's main campaign of the season was in the F4 British Championship competing with his F4 UAE team Hitech Pulse-Eight, where he partnered Kanato Le, William Macintyre and Gabriel Stilp. After respectable results in the first three rounds, he got his maiden Formula 4 pole position at the first race of the fourth round at Thruxton. He converted that pole into his maiden win, podium and fastest lap in the series and Formula 4 in general.

Piszcyk's next success came at the sixth round in Silverstone, coming third in the first race and converting a second pole position into a win in the third race. He got his first reverse-grid podium in the eighth round at Knockhill and ended the championship in fifth place with 220 points.

==== 2024 ====
For 2024, Piszcyk returned to his home country Australia, to compete in the relaunched Formula 4 Australian Championship with AGI Sport, who he tested with in 2022.

Piszcyk dominated the competition, winning the first nine races and getting five out of six available pole positions. He clinched the title at the first race of the final round – and only international round – at the Sepang International Circuit in Malaysia, where he came third in the race, breaking his win streak. Piszcyk came in sixth position in the final two races of the season and finished the championship with 256 points, nine wins, six pole positions, eight fastest laps and ten podiums. He had a 81 points margin between his closest title rival, Nicolas Stati.

For the closing months of 2024, Piszcyk joined the newly established Formula Trophy UAE with AGI Sport. His teammates were Emily Cotty, Nooris Gafoor and Formula 4 Australian Championship title rival, Nicolas Stati. Despite only contesting two out of the championships three rounds, he was the only one in his team to score podiums, he got two podium finishes back-to-back at the second and third race of the first round at Dubai Autodrome. At the second round in Yas Marina Circuit, he got sixth in the first race and came twentieth in the second race. Piszcyk finished the championship in sixth with 48 points and two podiums.

==== 2025 ====
After a successful sophomore year in Formula 4, Piszcyk came back to the F4 British Championship for the 2025 season with last year's teams runner-ups, Rodin Motorsport.

Piszcyk achieved a podium in the third race of the first round at Donington Park, and collected two pole positions at Silverstone Circuit a round later – converting them to wins.

Piszcyk got a third place at Thruxton and won the reserve grid races at Oulton Park and Donington Park. With these results he found himself in the title fight with Fionn McLaughlin and Martin Molnár, and in the final round at Brands Hatch, he got two pole positions and converted them to wins, similar to Silverstone. He came runner-up to the championship with six wins, four pole positions, two fastest laps, ten podiums and 311 points.

== Karting record ==
=== Karting career summary ===
| Season | Series | Team | Position |
|---|---|---|---|
| 2017 | Australian Kart Championship - Cadet 12 | | 24th |
| 2018 | Australian State Championship South Australia - Cadet 12 | | 1st |
| 2018 | Australian Kart Championship - Cadet 12 | | 3rd |
| 2019 | Australian Kart Championship - KA2 | | 11th |
| 2019 | Australian Kart Championship - KA4 Jr. | | 41st |
| 2020 | Australian Kart Championship - KA2 | | |

== Racing record ==
=== Racing career summary ===
| Season | Series | Team | Races | Wins | Poles | F/Laps | Podiums | Points | Position |
|---|---|---|---|---|---|---|---|---|---|
| 2021 | Australian Formula Ford Championship | Synergy Motorsport | 5 | 0 | 0 | 0 | 0 | | |
| 2021 | Formula Ford Fiesta Victoria | Synergy Motorsport | 2 | 0 | 0 | 0 | 0 | 28 | 18th |
| 2022 | Australian Formula Ford Championship | CHE Racing | 18 | 4 | 1 | 5 | 10 | 237 | 2nd |
| 2022 | Victorian Formula Ford Championship | CHE Racing | 3 | 0 | 0 | 0 | 0 | 69 | 19th |
| 2022 | Formula Ford New South Wales - Duratec | | ? | ? | ? | ? | ? | 277 | 1st |
| 2023 | Formula 4 UAE Championship | Hitech Pulse-Eight | 15 | 0 | 0 | 0 | 0 | 25 | 15th |
| 2023 | F4 British Championship | Hitech Pulse-Eight | 30 | 2 | 2 | 2 | 4 | 220 | 5th |
| 2024 | Formula 4 Australian Championship | AGI Sport | 12 | 9 | 6 | 8 | 10 | 256 | 1st |
| 2024 | Formula Trophy UAE | AGI Sport | 5 | 0 | 0 | 0 | 2 | 48 | 6th |
| 2025 | F4 British Championship | Rodin Motorsport | 30 | 6 | 4 | 2 | 10 | 311 | **2nd** |

=== Complete Formula 4 UAE Championship results ===
(key) (Races in bold indicate pole position) (Races in italics indicate fastest lap)

| Year | Entrant | 1 | 2 | 3 | 4 | 5 | 6 | 7 | 8 | 9 | 10 | 11 | 12 | 13 | 14 | 15 | DC | Points |
|---|---|---|---|---|---|---|---|---|---|---|---|---|---|---|---|---|---|---|
| 2023 | Hitech Pulse-Eight | DUB1; 1; 16 | DUB1; 2; 19 | DUB1; 3; 8 | KMT1; 1; 15 | KMT1; 2; 18 | KMT1; 3; 17 | KMT2; 1; 15 | KMT2; 2; 14 | KMT2; 3; 6 | DUB2; 1; 5 | DUB2; 2; 14 | DUB2; 3; 9 | YMC; 1; 25 | YMC; 2 Ret | YMC; 3; 10 | 15th | 25 |

=== Complete F4 British Championship results ===
(key) (Races in bold indicate pole position; races in italics indicate fastest lap)

| Year | Team | 1 | 2 | 3 | 4 | 5 | 6 | 7 | 8 | 9 | 10 | 11 | 12 | 13 | 14 | 15 | 16 | 17 | 18 | 19 | 20 | 21 | 22 | 23 | 24 | 25 | 26 | 27 | 28 | 29 | 30 | 31 | 32 | DC | Points |
|---|---|---|---|---|---|---|---|---|---|---|---|---|---|---|---|---|---|---|---|---|---|---|---|---|---|---|---|---|---|---|---|---|---|---|---|
| 2023 | Hitech Pulse-Eight | DPN; 1; 10 | DPN; 2; 14 | DPN; 3; 18 | BHI; 1; 7 | BHI; 1; 10^{1} | BHI; 3; 6 | SNE; 1 C | SNE; 2; 5^{10} | SNE; 3; 5 | **THR**; **1**; 1 | THR; 2; 15^{5} | THR; 3; 5 | OUL; 1; 10 | OUL; 2; 7^{3} | OUL; 3; 15 | SIL; 1; 3 | SIL; 2; 10^{1} | **SIL**; **3**; 1 | CRO; 1; 8 | CRO; 2; 5^{4} | CRO; 3; 8 | KNO; 1; 10 | KNO; 2; 3^{2} | KNO; 3; 18 | DPGP; 1; 7 | DPGP; 2; 10 | DPGP; 3; 12^{4} | DPGP; 4; 6 | BHGP; 1; 4 | BHGP; 2; 10^{4} | BHGP; 3; 4 | | 5th | 220 |
| 2025 | Rodin Motorsport | DPN; 1; 9 | DPN; 2; 5^{3} | DPN; 3; 3 | **SILGP**; **1**; 1 | SILGP; 2; 12 | **SILGP**; **3**; 1 | SNE; 1 Ret | SNE; 2; 12 | SNE; 3; 4 | THR; 1 Ret | THR; 2; 3^{1} | THR; 3; 6 | OUL; 1; 13 | OUL; 2; 1^{1} | OUL; 3; 4 | SILGP; 1; 13 | SILGP; 2; 12 | ZAN; 1; 4 | ZAN; 2; 4^{5} | ZAN; 3; 2 | KNO; 1; 6 | KNO; 2; 5^{1} | KNO; 3; 11 | DPGP; 1; 4 | DPGP; 2; 1^{2} | DPGP; 3; 5 | SILN; 1; 4 | SILN; 2; 8 | SILN; 3; 3 | **BHGP**; **1**; 1 | BHGP; 2; 10^{1} | **BHGP**; **3**; 1 | 2nd | 311 |

=== Complete Formula 4 Australian Championship results ===
(key) (Races in bold indicate pole position; races in italics indicate fastest lap)

| Year | Team | 1 | 2 | 3 | 4 | 5 | 6 | 7 | 8 | 9 | 10 | 11 | 12 | DC | Points |
|---|---|---|---|---|---|---|---|---|---|---|---|---|---|---|---|
| 2024 | AGI Sport | **BEN1**; **1**; 1 | BEN1; 2; 1 | **BEN1**; **3**; 1 | **BEN2**; **1**; 1 | BEN2; 2; 1 | **BEN2**; **3**; 1 | **SYD**; **1**; 1 | SYD; 2; 1 | **SYD**; **3**; 1 | SEP; 1; 3 | SEP; 2; 6 | SEP; 3; 6 | 1st | 256 |

=== Complete Formula Trophy UAE results ===
(key) (Races in bold indicate pole position; races in italics indicate fastest lap)

| Year | Team | 1 | 2 | 3 | 4 | 5 | 6 | 7 | DC | Points |
|---|---|---|---|---|---|---|---|---|---|---|
| 2024 | AGI Sport | DUB; 1; 5 | DUB; 2; 3 | DUB; 3; 3 | YMC1; 1; 6 | YMC1; 2; 20 | YMC2; 1 | YMC2; 2 | 6th | 48 |
