= 2019 Hi-Tec Oils Bathurst 6 Hour =

Motor racing competition

Layout of the Mount Panorama Circuit

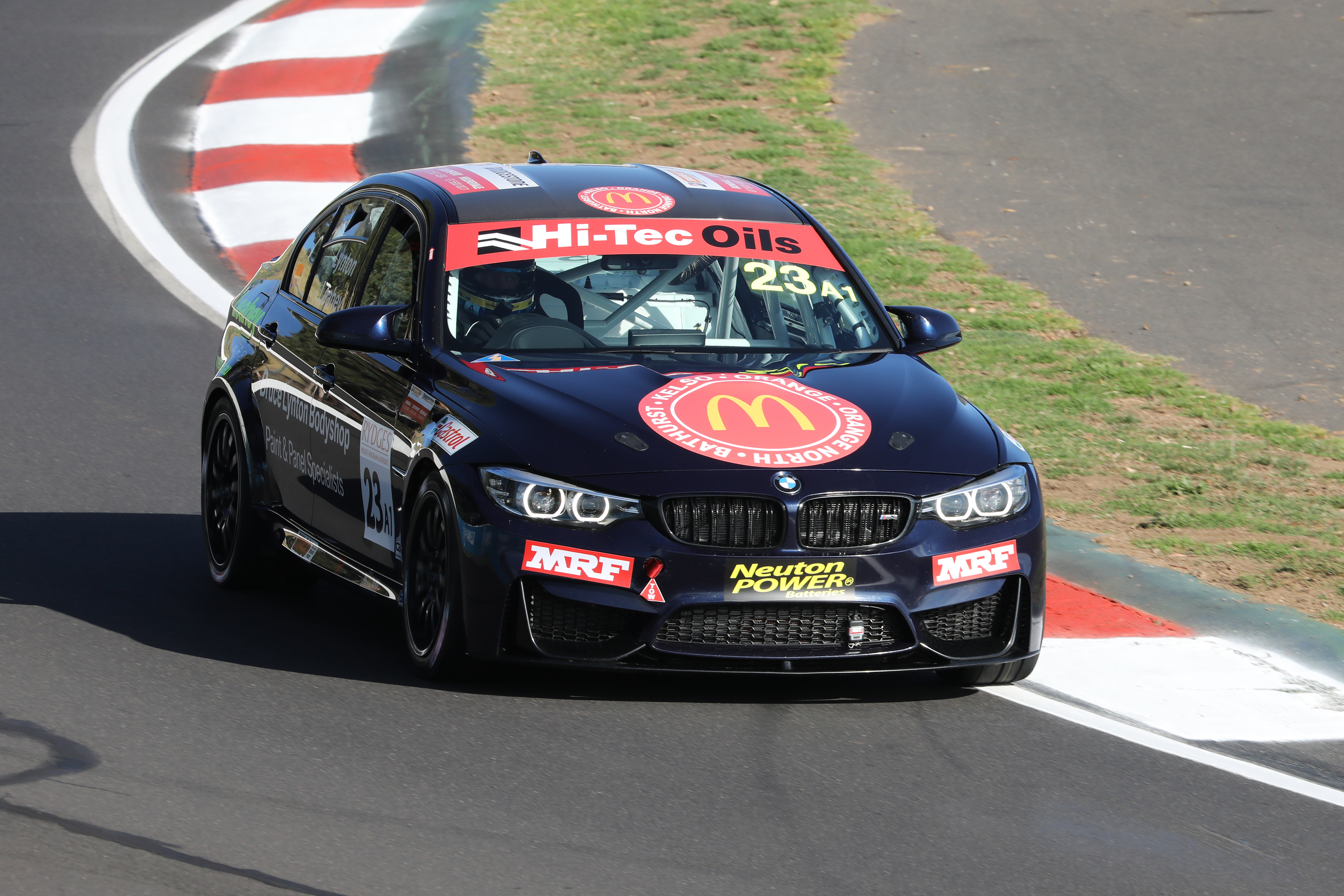
The race and Class A1-winning BMW M3 F80 Competition of Beric Lynton and Tim Leahey.

The 2019 Hi-Tec Oils Bathurst 6 Hour was an endurance race for Group 3E Series Production Cars. The event, which was staged at the Mount Panorama Circuit, near Bathurst, in New South Wales, Australia, on 21 April 2019, was the fourth running of the Bathurst 6 Hour. The race was won by Beric Lynton and Tim Leahey, driving a BMW M3 F80 Competition. The race saw a new distance record established for the event, with 131 laps (813.903 km) completed.

== Class structure ==
Cars competed in the following classes:

- Class A1: Extreme Performance (Forced Induction)
- Class A2: Extreme Performance (Naturally Aspirated)
- Class B: High Performance
- Class C: Performance
- Class D: Production
- Class E: Compact

== Results ==
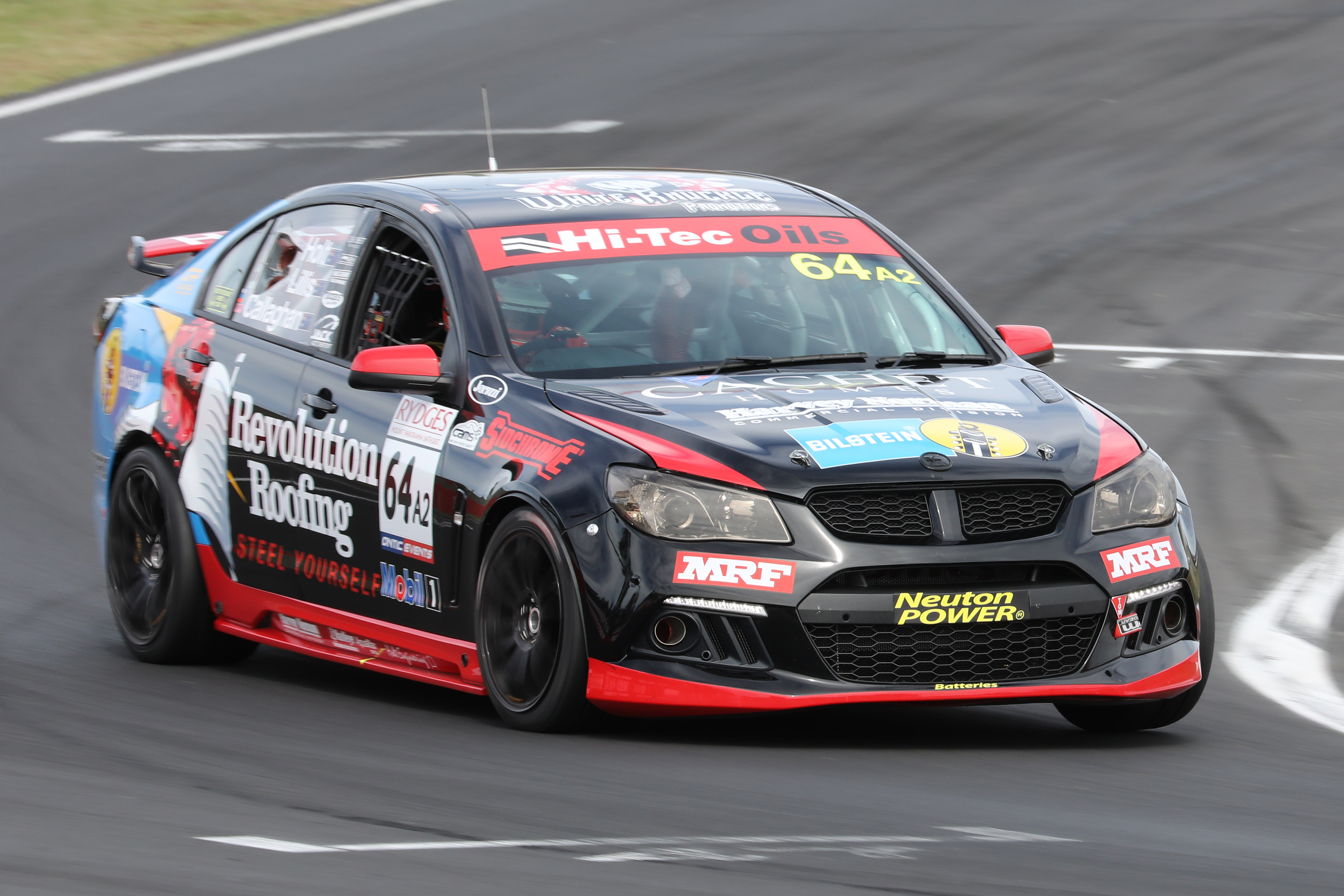
The Class A2-winning HSV VF ClubSport R8 of Chris Lillis, Nathan Callaghan and Matthew Holt.

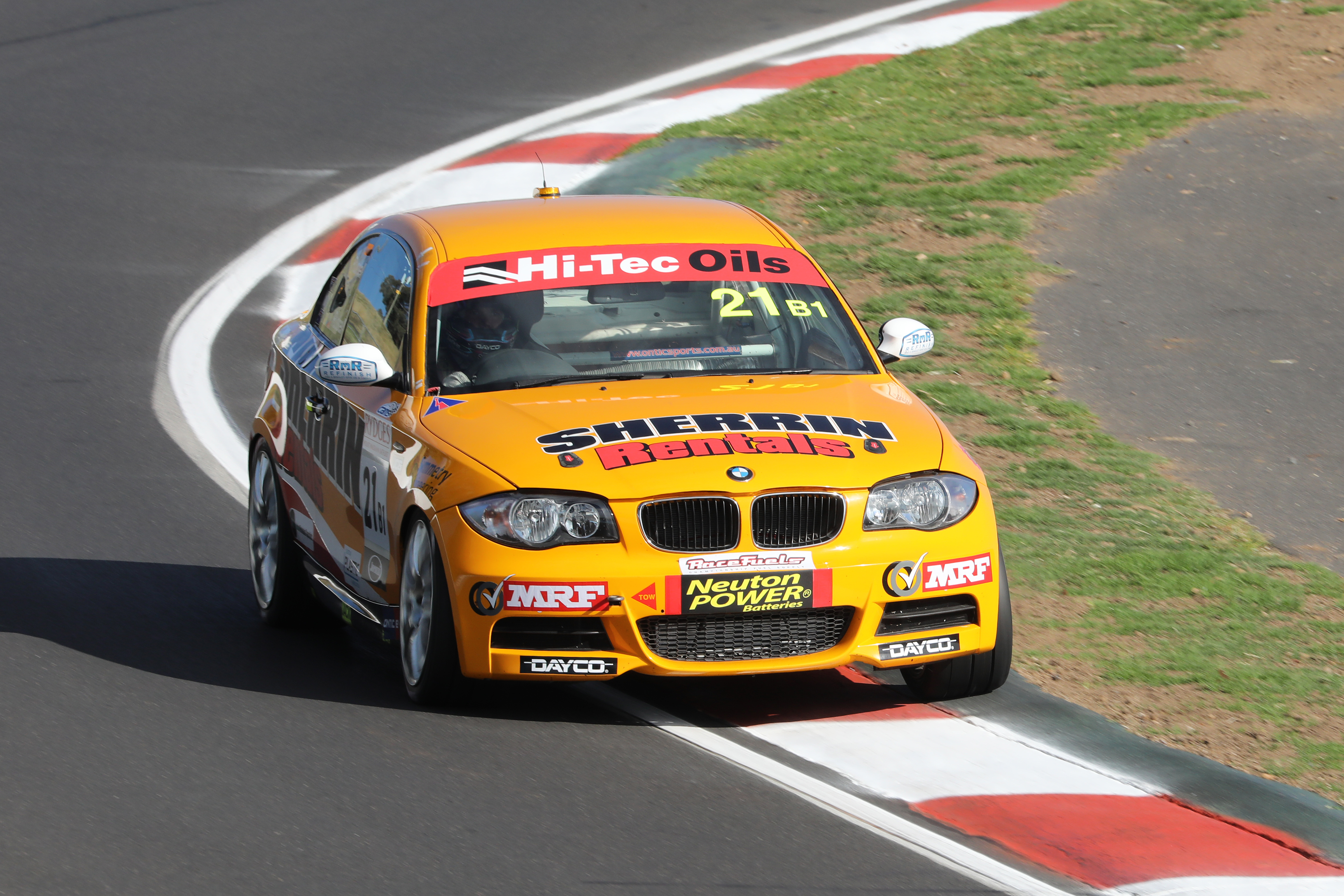
The Class B-winning BMW 135i E82 of David Russell and Geoffrey Russell.

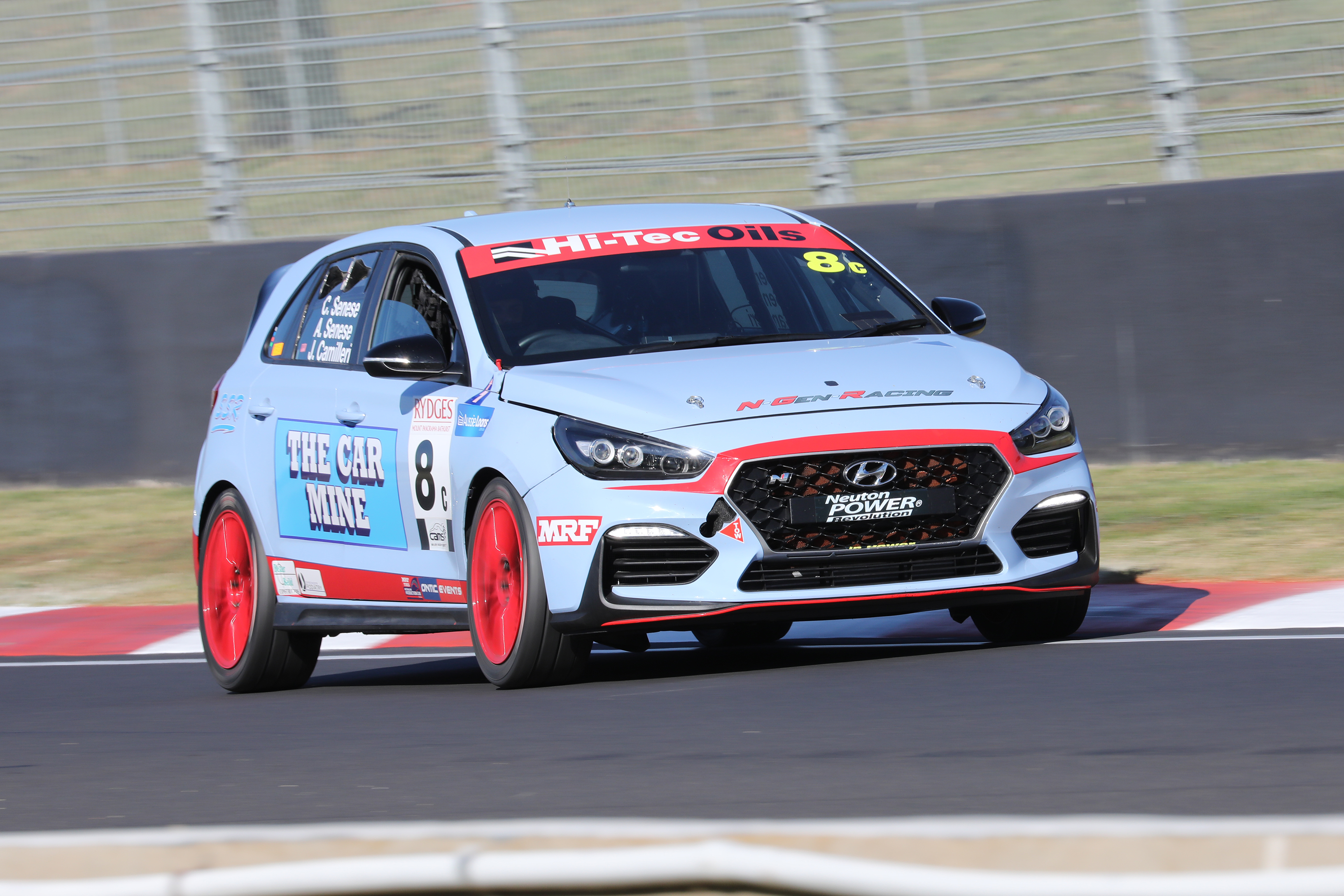
The Class C-winning Hyundai i30 N of Charlie Senese, Alfie Senese and Jake Camilleri.

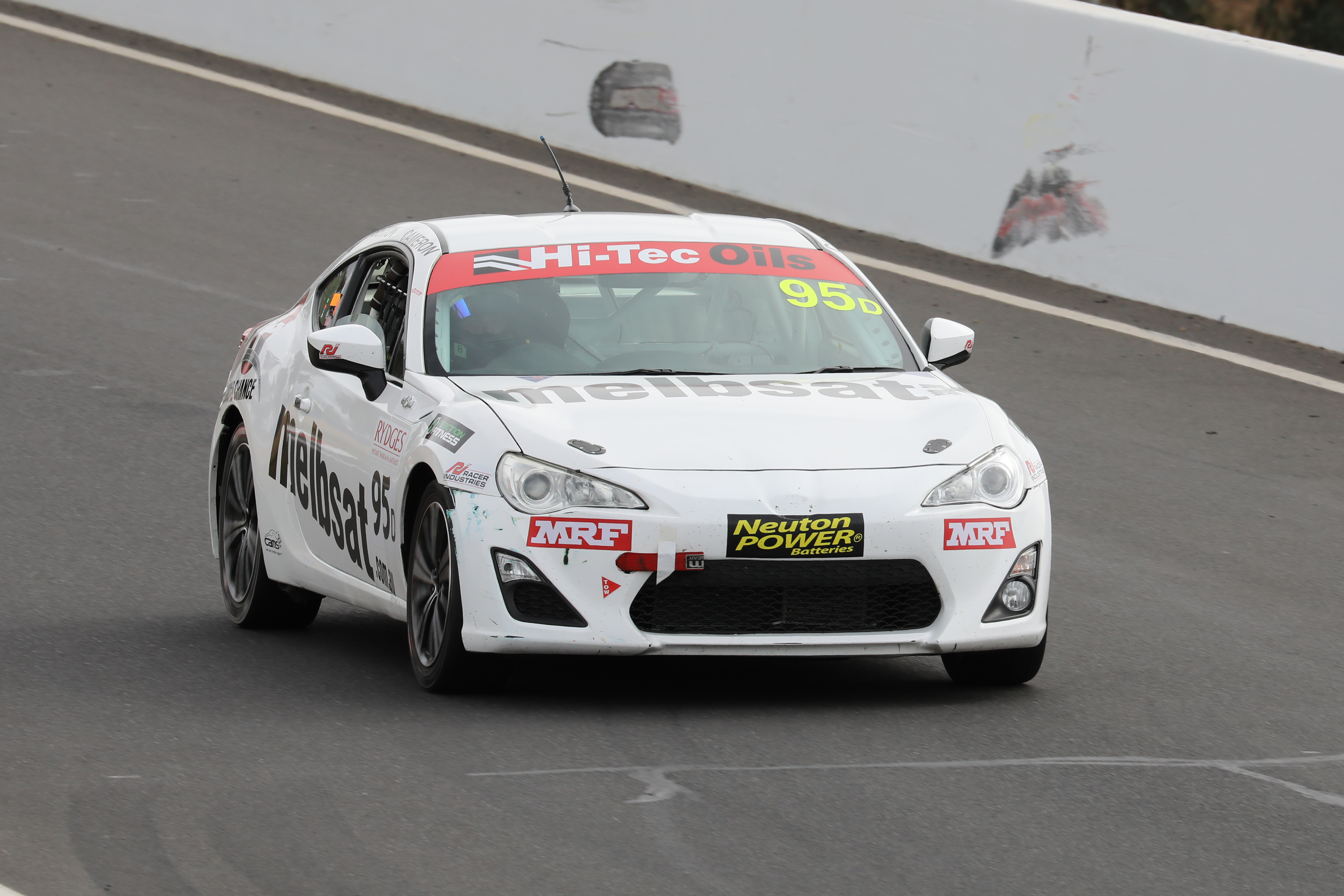
The Class D-winning Toyota 86 GT of Aaron Cameron, Kyle Gurton and Cooper Murray.

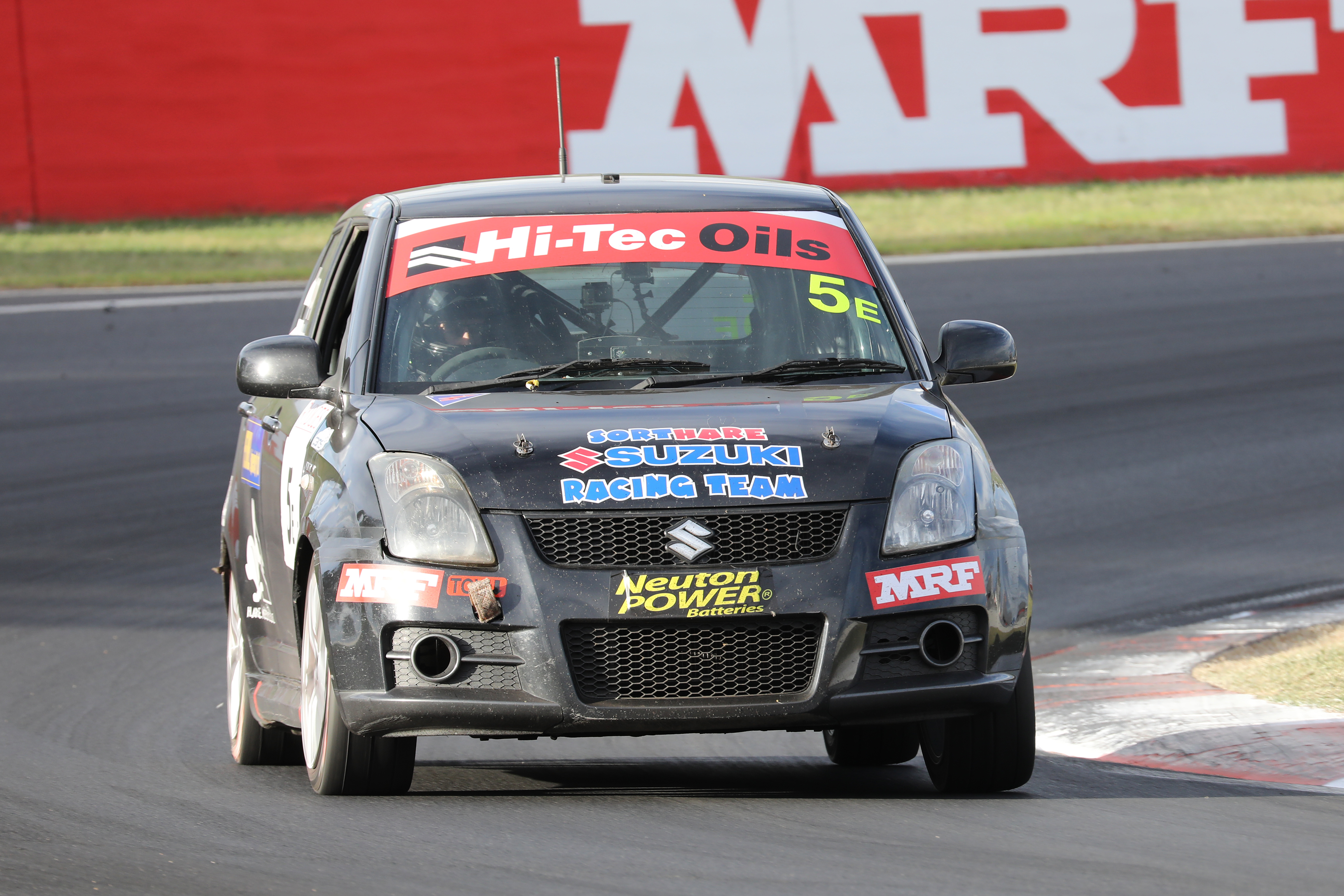
The Class E-winning Suzuki Swift Sport RS416 of Michael Hopp and Steve Pittman.

Pos.	Class	No.	Drivers	Entrant	Car	Laps
1	**A1**	**23**	**(Australia) Beric Lynton (Australia) Tim Leahey**	**Beric Lynton Bodyshop**	**BMW M3 F80 Competition**	**131**
2	A1	1	(Australia) Grant Sherrin (Australia) Iain Sherrin	Sherrin Rentals	BMW M4 F82	130
3	**A2**	**64**	**(Australia) Chris Lillis (Australia) Nathan Callaghan (Australia) Matthew Holt**	**Cachel Homes**	**HSV VF ClubSport R8**	**128**
4	**B**	**21**	**(Australia) David Russell (Australia) Geoffrey Russell**	**Aussie Wide Builders**	**BMW 135i E82**	**128**
5	A1	14	(Australia) Paul Loiacono (Australia) Deiter Holzl	F1 Armchair Experts	Mitsubishi Lancer Evolution X RS	128
6	A1	12	(Australia) Brad Woods (Australia) Hadrian Morrall	Brad Woods	BMW 1 Series M Coupé E82	127
7	A1	25	(Australia) Simon Hodges (Australia) Jayden Ojeda (Australia) Iain Slateri	Secure Wealth Advisers	BMW M135i Hatch F20	126
8	A2	19	(Australia) Anthony Gilbertson (Australia) Andrew Mill	Garage 1	BMW M3 E92	123
9	B	48	(Australia) Scott Gore (Australia) Keith Bensley	ASAP Marketing	BMW 135i E82	122
10	A2	18	(Australia) Graeme Muir (Australia) Jamie Hodgson	Gramur Stainless	HSV E Series GTS	122
11	**C**	**8**	**(Australia) Charlie Senese (Australia) Alfie Senese (Australia) Jake Camilleri**	**N-Gen-Racing**	**Hyundai i30 N**	**121**
12	C	89	(Australia) Jake Williams (Australia) Rodney Stait (Australia) Steven Williams	Pinnacle Automotive, Rod's Pools	BMW M3 E36	121
13	**D**	**95**	**(Australia) Aaron Cameron (Australia) Kyle Gurton (Australia) Cooper Murray**	**Aaron Cameron Racing**	**Toyota 86 GT**	**121**
14	C	7	(Australia) Frank Mammarella (Australia) Kaden Olsen (Australia) Scott Green	N-Gen-Racing	Hyundai i30 N	120
15	C	20	(Australia) Peter Lacey (Australia) Robin Lacey (Australia) Matilda Mravicic	ozEtees, Gold Coast Embroidery	Volkswagen Scirocco R	118
16	D	86	(Australia) Michael James (Australia) Troy Rolley (Australia) Andrew Wilton	The 86 Shop	Toyota 86 GT	118
17	A1	66	(Australia) Dimitri Agathos (Australia) Matthew Boylan (Australia) Graeme Heath	Nova Employment, FullGas Racing	Subaru Impreza WRX STI	116
18	C	34	(Australia) Christopher Manley (Australia) Lea Medhurst	Traffic Control Innovations	BMW 130i E87	116
19	C	87	(Australia) James Goldsbrough (Australia) Gavin Driscoll (Australia) Jake White	Free Spirit Tattoo	BMW 130i E87	115
20	B	73	(Australia) Justin Elliot (New Zealand) Shaun Varney (Australia) Mark Caine	Race Academy International	Holden Commodore VE SS-V Redline	113
21	**E**	**5**	**(Australia) Michael Hopp (Australia) Steve Pittman**	**HARE Engineering**	**Suzuki Swift Sport RS416**	**113**
22	B	30	(Australia) Jason Simes (Australia) Ben Walsh	APDV Workplace Drone Solutions	BMW M3 E36	112
23	D	11	(Australia) Murray Dowsett (Singapore) Graeme Dowsett (China) Davide Rizzo	Competition Products	Toyota 86 GTS	111
24	E	2	(Australia) Andrew McMaster (Australia) David Noble (Australia) David Worrell	Madaz Motorsport	Mazda 3 SP25	110
25	B	50	(Australia) James Keene (Australia) Matt Thewlis (Australia) Richard Luff	MWM Racing	Volkswagen Golf R	109
26	E	51	(New Zealand) Alan Turner (Australia) Chris Holdt (Australia) Ross Donaldson	Wahlstrom Private Wealth	Mazda 3 SP23	107
27	C	35	(Australia) Ric Shaw (Australia) Lachlan O'Hara (United Kingdom) David Cox	OccSafe Australia, Cox Claims Group	Mazda RX-8	99
28	D	33	(Australia) Harrison Gray (Australia) Jimmy Vernon	McLaurin Motorsport	Toyota 86 GTS	75
29	A1	69	(Australia) Joe Krinelos (Australia) Tony Virag (Australia) John Bowe	Krincorp Racing, Timkin	HSV VF GTS	63
30	D	41	(Australia) Lachlan Mineeff (Australia) Thomas Sargent	Solo-Werks, Tegra, Purple Sector	Toyota 86 GTS	52
DNF	A1	40	(Australia) Jordan Cox (Australia) Graeme Cox (Australia) Daniel Smith	Cox Automotive	Mitsubishi Lancer Evolution X RS	96
DNF	A1	68	(Australia) Dylan Thomas (Australia) Kyle Austin	Hi-Tec Oils, Royal Medical	Mitsubishi Lancer Evolution IX RS	91
DNF	A2	53	(Australia) Robert Coulthard (Australia) Trevor Symonds	Muscat Trailers	CSV Mondo GT	71
DNF	A1	67	(Australia) Jeremy Gray (Australia) George Miedecke (Australia) Andrew Miedecke	JMG Racing/Bilstein	FPV FG GT-F	67
DNF	A2	44	(Australia) Daniel Clift (Australia) Ashley Heffernan (Australia) Wayne Clift	Nolan Finishes Professional Painting Services	HSV VZ Clubsport R8	66
DNF	A2	55	(Australia) Daniel Flangan (Australia) Merrick Malouf	Prime Finance, Goodyear, Fifthgear	HSV VY GTS	58
DNF	A1	56	(Australia) Brad Schumacher (Australia) Mark Griffith (Australia) Brad Shiels	Kelso Electrical	Subaru Impreza WRX STI	53
DNF	D	47	(Australia) David Baker (Australia) Brian Callaghan	Online Hire	Honda Integra Type R DC2	50
DNF	A1	77	(Australia) Jack Winter (Australia) Zac Raddatz	Yellowspeed, MX5 Mania	Mitsubishi Lancer Evolution IX RS	44
DNF	A1	45	(Australia) Michael Auld (Australia) Richard Bloomfield (Australia) Brian Walden	HPS Transport, Airtag	Mercedes-Benz A 45 AMG	37
DNF	A1	92	(Australia) Stephen Thompson (Australia) Ed Kreamer (Australia) Michael King	Allworth Homes	Mitsubishi Lancer Evolution X RS	24
DNF	B	72	(Japan) Christopher Gleeson (Australia) Kurt Macready	Atlas Motorsport, Luce Teas	Subaru Impreza WRX	24
DNF	A1	15	(Australia) Michael Kavich (Australia) Benjamin Kavich (Australia) Garth Walden	Race for a Cure, Breast Cancer Trials	Mitsubishi Lancer Evolution X RS	17
DNF	A1	4	(Australia) Anthony Soole (Australia) Andrew Fisher	Property Investment Store	BMW M4 F82	15

- Class winners are shown in bold text.
- Race time of winning car: 6:01:13.6680
- Pole position: 2:24.8000, Tim Leahey
- Fastest race lap: 2:27.9680, Tim Leahey
