= 2025 AU4 Australian Championship =

Motorsport season

The 2025 AU4 Australian Championship was held in Australia for Formula 4 cars. The series was previously known as the Formula 4 Australian Championship. It was the seventh national championship in Formula 4, and the first under the name of AU4.

The series is sanctioned by Motorsport Australia.

Globally, Formula 4 is the first step out of karting on the FIA Global Pathway from Karting to Formula One. It is no longer the only series on the pathway run in Australia, with the introduction of Formula Regional Australia in 2025.

== Structure ==
Significant changes have been made to the championship for 2025 along with the name. The new promoter for the series is AGI Sport, who have been the most successful team in Australian Formula 4, replacing the China-based Top Speed organisation.

There will be two types of car on the grid simultaneously; the Tatuus F4-T421 with the Abarth engine (termed "Gen 2") used in the 2024 championship, and the previous generation Mygale M14-F4 with the Ford engine used from 2015 to 2019 ("Gen 1"). The two will be treated as separate classes, and will be separated on the starting grid. Only Gen 2 cars will be eligible for the overall championship. Both races will run together, unusual in Formula 4 championships. Unlike its American counterpart, where there is both a Gen 1 (Ligier Junior Formula) and Gen 2 (United States F4) championship, and the two generations of cars run in separate races, both generations of cars will participate in one race. The minimum age for drivers in the Gen2 (Class A) cars is 15, and 14 for the Gen1 cars. There will be cups awarded to the best 14-17 year old driver in Gen1 cars ("Class B") & best 30+ driver ("Masters").

According to Motorsport Australia, the changes are to enable the broadest range of participants in the series, including (older) owner-drivers racing for enjoyment (and not aiming for a professional career overseas), and junior drivers seeking affordable racing experience in open-wheelers, as well as those contesting for the overall win in the latest generation F4 car.

== Teams and drivers ==
Team	No.	Drivers	Class	Rounds
(Australia) Tim Macrow Racing	2	(Australia) Georgia Morgan	G2	1–2, 4
(Australia) Tim Macrow Racing	21	(Australia) Chloe Lane	G1; G2 (Note: Lane competed in Gen 1 for rounds 1–4, and Gen 2 for round 5.)	All
(Australia) Tim Macrow Racing	30	(Australia) Brock Burton	G2	All
(Australia) Tim Macrow Racing	35	(Australia) Harrison Duske	G2	All
(Australia) AGI Sport	3	(Australia) Jesse James Samuels	G1	All
(Australia) AGI Sport	6	(Australia) Koby Wilson	G1	All
(Australia) AGI Sport	13	(Australia) Noah Killion	G2	All
(Australia) AGI Sport	29	(Australia) Imogen Radburn	G2	1–3, 5
(Australia) AGI Sport	29	(Australia) Nathan Gotch	G2	4
(Australia) AGI Sport	31	(Australia) Jensen Marold	G1	1–4
(Australia) AGI Sport	41	(Australia) Xavier Babbage-Hockey	G1	3–5
(Australia) AGI Sport	44	(Australia) Cohen Kokotovich	G2	All
(Australia) AGI Sport	73	(Australia) De'Argo Stewart	G1	All
(Australia) AGI Sport	77	(Australia) Jamie Lee-Su	G1	4–5
(Australia) AGI Sport	95	(Australia) Christian Ayrouth	G1	5
(Australia) Volante Rosso Motorsport	11	(Australia) Isaac McNeill	G2	All
(New Zealand) Formula Race Academy	23	(Australia) Lawrence Katsidis	G1	1–3, 5
(New Zealand) Formula Race Academy	77	(Australia) Nicholas Filipetto	G1	1–2
(Australia) Andrew Fitzpatrick Motorsport	88	(Australia) Andrew Fitzpatrick	G1	All

Icon	Class
G2	Gen 2
G1	Gen 1

== Calendar ==
The initial schedule was revealed on January 17. But following shipping delays, organisers announced on March 7 that the opening round in Sydney would be postponed to late August.

Round	Circuit	Dates	Map
1	(South Australia) The Bend Motorsport Park (International Circuit)	23–25 May	2025 AU4 Australian Championship is located in Australia
2	(South Australia) The Bend Motorsport Park (West Circuit)	12–13 July	2025 AU4 Australian Championship is located in Australia
3	(Victoria (state)) Phillip Island Grand Prix Circuit (Grand Prix Circuit)	16–17 August	2025 AU4 Australian Championship is located in Australia
4	(New South Wales) Sydney Motorsport Park (Grand Prix Circuit)	29–31 August	2025 AU4 Australian Championship is located in Australia
5	(New South Wales) Sydney Motorsport Park (Grand Prix Circuit)	26–28 September	2025 AU4 Australian Championship is located in Australia

== Race results ==
Rnd.		Circuit	Gen 2				Gen 1			
Rnd.		Circuit	Pole position	Fastest lap	Winning driver	Winning team	Pole position	Fastest lap	Winning driver	Winning team
1	R1	(South Australia) The Bend Motorsport Park	(Australia) Harrison Duske	(Australia) Noah Killion	(Australia) Harrison Duske	(Australia) Tim Macrow Racing	(Australia) Jensen Marold	(Australia) Jensen Marold	(Australia) Jensen Marold	(Australia) AGI Sport
1	R2	(South Australia) The Bend Motorsport Park		(Australia) Noah Killion	(Australia) Noah Killion	(Australia) AGI Sport		(Australia) Jensen Marold	(Australia) Jensen Marold	(Australia) AGI Sport
1	R3	(South Australia) The Bend Motorsport Park	(Australia) Noah Killion	(Australia) Harrison Duske	(Australia) Isaac McNeill	(Australia) Volante Rosso Motorsport	(Australia) Jensen Marold	(Australia) Jensen Marold	(Australia) Jensen Marold	(Australia) AGI Sport
2	R1	(South Australia) The Bend Motorsport Park	(Australia) Isaac McNeill	(Australia) Noah Killion	(Australia) Isaac McNeill	(Australia) Volante Rosso Motorsport	(Australia) Jensen Marold	(Australia) Jensen Marold	(Australia) Jensen Marold	(Australia) AGI Sport
2	R2	(South Australia) The Bend Motorsport Park		(Australia) Noah Killion	(Australia) Isaac McNeill	(Australia) Volante Rosso Motorsport		(Australia) Jensen Marold	(Australia) Jensen Marold	(Australia) AGI Sport
2	R3	(South Australia) The Bend Motorsport Park	(Australia) Harrison Duske	(Australia) Noah Killion	(Australia) Noah Killion	(Australia) AGI Sport	(Australia) Jensen Marold	(Australia) Jensen Marold	(Australia) Jensen Marold	(Australia) AGI Sport
3	R1	(Victoria (state)) Phillip Island Grand Prix Circuit	(Australia) Harrison Duske	(Australia) Noah Killion	(Australia) Noah Killion	(Australia) AGI Sport	(Australia) Jensen Marold	(Australia) Jensen Marold	(Australia) Jensen Marold	(Australia) AGI Sport
3	R2	(Victoria (state)) Phillip Island Grand Prix Circuit		(Australia) Noah Killion	(Australia) Isaac McNeill	(Australia) Volante Rosso Motorsport		(Australia) Jensen Marold	(Australia) Jensen Marold	(Australia) AGI Sport
3	R3	(Victoria (state)) Phillip Island Grand Prix Circuit	(Australia) Harrison Duske	(Australia) Harrison Duske	(Australia) Noah Killion	(Australia) AGI Sport	(Australia) Jensen Marold	(Australia) Andrew Fitzpatrick	(Australia) Jensen Marold	(Australia) AGI Sport
4	R1	(New South Wales) Sydney Motorsport Park	(Australia) Noah Killion	(Australia) Noah Killion	(Australia) Noah Killion	(Australia) AGI Sport	(Australia) Andrew Fitzpatrick	(Australia) Jensen Marold	(Australia) Jensen Marold	(Australia) AGI Sport
4	R2	(New South Wales) Sydney Motorsport Park		(Australia) Noah Killion	(Australia) Noah Killion	(Australia) AGI Sport		(Australia) Jensen Marold	(Australia) Jensen Marold	(Australia) AGI Sport
4	R3	(New South Wales) Sydney Motorsport Park	(Australia) Harrison Duske	(Australia) Noah Killion	(Australia) Isaac McNeill	(Australia) Volante Rosso Motorsport	(Australia) Andrew Fitzpatrick	(Australia) Jensen Marold	(Australia) Jensen Marold	(Australia) AGI Sport
5	R1	(New South Wales) Sydney Motorsport Park	(Australia) Harrison Duske	(Australia) Noah Killion	(Australia) Noah Killion	(Australia) AGI Sport	(Australia) Andrew Fitzpatrick	(Australia) Andrew Fitzpatrick	(Australia) Andrew Fitzpatrick	(Australia) Andrew Fitzpatrick Motorsport
5	R2	(New South Wales) Sydney Motorsport Park		(Australia) Noah Killion	(Australia) Noah Killion	(Australia) AGI Sport		(Australia) Andrew Fitzpatrick	(Australia) Andrew Fitzpatrick	(Australia) Andrew Fitzpatrick Motorsport
5	R3	(New South Wales) Sydney Motorsport Park	(Australia) Noah Killion	(Australia) Harrison Duske	(Australia) Noah Killion	(Australia) AGI Sport	(Australia) Andrew Fitzpatrick	(Australia) Andrew Fitzpatrick	(Australia) Andrew Fitzpatrick	(Australia) Andrew Fitzpatrick Motorsport

== Championship standings ==
Points are awarded to the top 10 classified finishers in each race. Each round there is also one point for pole position in each of the two qualifying sessions and one point for fastest lap in each of the three races. In Gen 1 and Gen 2, only a driver's best twelve finishes are counted for the championship. While Gen 1 and Gen 2 award points per finishing order in each class, in the Masters category points are awarded based on a driver's outright finishing position in each race. The driver who accumulates the highest points total in all rounds will be declared the Masters Winner.

Position	**1st**	**2nd**	**3rd**	**4th**	**5th**	**6th**	**7th**	**8th**	**9th**	**10th**	**Pole**	**FL**
Points	25	18	15	12	10	8	6	4	2	1	1	1

=== Gen 2 ===
Pos	Driver	BND 1 (South Australia)			BND 2 (South Australia)			PHI (Victoria (state))			SYD 1 (New South Wales)			SYD 2 (New South Wales)			Pts
Pos	Driver	R1	R2	R3	R1	R2	R3	R1	R2	R3	R1	R2	R3	R1	R2	R3	Pts
1	(Australia) Noah Killion	4	1	**(7)**	4	(5)	1	1	4	1	**1**	1	2	1	1	**(5)**	268
2	(Australia) Isaac McNeill	(3)	2	1	**1**	1	2	3	1	(5)	2	3	**1**	3	3	(4)	241
3	(Australia) Harrison Duske	**1**	(4)	3	2	4	**3**	**2**	2	**2**	3	2	Ret	**2**	2	(6)	212
4	(Australia) Imogen Radburn	2	3	2	5	2	5	5	3	4				4	Ret	2	156
5	(Australia) Cohen Kokotovich	6	Ret	4	3	3	4	4	Ret	2	(7)	6	3	5	4	7	143
6	(Australia) Brock Burton	5	5	5	(6)	(7†)	6	6	5	Ret	4	4	4	6	5	1	135
7	(Australia) Georgia Morgan	Ret	6	6	7	6	7				6	7	5				60
8	(Australia) Chloe Lane													7	6	3	29
9	(Australia) Nathan Gotch										5	5	WD				20
Pos	Driver	R1	R2	R3	R1	R2	R3	R1	R2	R3	R1	R2	R3	R1	R2	R3	Pts
Pos	Driver	BND 1 (South Australia)			BND 2 (South Australia)			PHI (Victoria (state))			SYD 1 (New South Wales)			SYD 2 (New South Wales)			Pts

Colour	Result
Gold	Winner
Silver	Second place
Bronze	Third place
Green	Points classification
Blue	Non-points classification
Blue	Non-classified finish (NC)
Purple	Retired, not classified (Ret)
Red	Did not qualify (DNQ)
Red	Did not pre-qualify (DNPQ)
Black	Disqualified (DSQ)
White	Did not start (DNS)
White	Withdrew (WD)
White	Race cancelled (C)
Blank	Did not practice (DNP)
Blank	Did not arrive (DNA)
Blank	Excluded (EX)

**Bold** – Pole
Italics – Fastest Lap
† — Did not finish, but classified

=== Gen 1 ===
Pos	Driver	BND 1 (South Australia)			BND 2 (South Australia)			PHI (Victoria (state))			SYD 1 (New South Wales)			SYD 2 (New South Wales)			Pts
Pos	Driver	R1	R2	R3	R1	R2	R3	R1	R2	R3	R1	R2	R3	R1	R2	R3	Pts
1	(Australia) Jensen Marold	**1**	1	**1**	**1**	1	**1**	**1**	1	**1**	1	1	1				317
2	(Australia) Andrew Fitzpatrick	(3)	(3)	3	(4)	3	3	2	2	2	**2**	2	**2**	**1**	1	**1**	236
3	(Australia) Koby Wilson	2	2	2	2	2	2	Ret	(4)	3	3	3	3	Ret	2	3	201
4	(Australia) De'Argo Stewart	5	4	4	6	5	5	5	6	5	5	Ret	5	2	Ret	Ret	128
5	(Australia) Jesse James Samuels	4	6	5	3	Ret	6	3	3	7	Ret	7	7	3	Ret	4	126
6	(Australia) Chloe Lane	6	5	Ret	5	4	4	4	5	4	4	4	4				122
7	(Australia) Xavier Babbage-Hockey							6	7	8	7	5	6	Ret	5	2	70
8	(Australia) Lawrence Katsidis	8	7	6	7	7	Ret	7	8	6				5	Ret	7	64
9	(Australia) Jamie Lee-Su										6	6	8	6	3	4	55
10	(Australia) Christian Ayrouth													4	4	6	32
11	(Australia) Nicholas Filipetto	7	DNS	DNS	Ret	6	7										20
Pos	Driver	R1	R2	R3	R1	R2	R3	R1	R2	R3	R1	R2	R3	R1	R2	R3	Pts
Pos	Driver	BND 1 (South Australia)			BND 2 (South Australia)			PHI (Victoria (state))			SYD 1 (New South Wales)			SYD 2 (New South Wales)			Pts
