= FIA Global Pathway =

Program to assist racing drivers in making progress to Formula One

The FIA Global Pathway from Karting to Formula One, or simply the FIA Global Pathway, is a program developed by the Fédération Internationale de l'Automobile (FIA), the international sanctioning body for motorsports, that is designed to assist racing drivers progress from karting to Formula One. The program was first developed in 2014 with the creation of the Formula 4 category, and follows a tiered structure, with drivers racing in increasingly-powerful cars. The Global Pathway represents the consolidation of feeder series to create a more linear approach to progressing into Formula One.

== Eligible series ==
=== Formula 4 ===
Formula 4 is the first stage of the Global Pathway, for drivers fifteen years of age and older. Formula 4 is structured as a "national" championship, with each series contained within a single geographical area. Despite the "national" classification, Formula 4 championships may encompass several countries. Each Formula 4 championship uses chassis and engines built to a single specification so that drivers can compete in multiple championships without having to adjust to a different car.

=== Formula Regional ===
The second stage of the Global Pathway is Formula Regional, previously known as Regional Formula 3, which puts drivers in cars that are more powerful than those used in Formula 4. Formula Regional was integrated to the pathway in 2018, resulting in the renaming of a number of national and regional championships, mostly previously known as "Formula 3". The series are classified as "regional" championships. As of 2025, there are five regional series: Americas, European, Japanese, Middle East, and Oceania.

The Macau Grand Prix is a one-off, global event run under Formula Regional rules, attracting drivers who race in the various Formula Regional championships.

=== Formula 3 ===
The only "international" series of Formula 3 is the FIA Formula 3 Championship, which started in 2019.

=== Formula 2 ===
Formula 2 is the final intermediary stage of the Global Pathway. The Formula 2 championship is an international championship, based mostly in Europe and run at F1 race weekend, but with some races in the Middle East and Australia. Drivers are not required to participate in Formula 2 to compete in Formula One, as success in Formula 3 contributes to a driver's FIA Super Licence, but of the series which are recognised as contributing to a Super Licence, Formula 2 has the greatest weight. Rather than creating a new series where none previously existed, the FIA chose to rebrand the GP2 Series as the FIA Formula 2 Championship starting in 2017.

=== Formula 1 ===
Formula One represents the top tier of the Global Pathway, with the series recognised by the FIA as the premier class of open-wheel motorsport.

=== Other series ===
Many other series, including open-wheel series such as Formula E, Euroformula Open Championship, GB3 & GB4 Championship, and "tin-top" categories such as the World Endurance Championship, Supercars Championship, and NASCAR Cup Series, are not considered to be a part of the Global Pathway, but will still contribute to a driver's Super Licence. In practice, however, virtually all drivers entering F1 in the 21st century have done so after competing in series in the global pathway or their predecessor series (possibly including a period as a third driver). Some drivers have spent time in IndyCar or the Japanese Super Formula Championships.

IndyCar, the premier American domestic open wheeler series, has its own development pathway, the USF Pro Championships. Like the FIA Global Pathway, the USF Pro Championships consists of a number of series using progressively faster and more powerful cars. As of 2024, Formula 4 has struggled for entries in the US, possibly due to the lower costs of competing in the USF Pro series. IndyCar itself ranks just below Formula 2 and above Formula 3 in terms of Super License points allocated, so the most successful IndyCar drivers can acquire sufficient points to get the Super Licence required to compete in F1 without competing in any other series.

=== Comparison ===
Class	F1	FIA F2	FIA F3	FR	F4	OK (karting)
Chassis	Various	Dallara F2 2024	Dallara F3 2025	Tatuus F3 T-326/Ligier JS F3	Tatuus F4-T421/Mygale M21-F4	Various
Engine	Hybrid 1.6 L turbocharged V6	3.4 L turbocharged V6	3.4 L NA V6	1.8 L / 2.0L	1.4-2.0 L	125 cc
Minimum weight (kg)	768	795	673	650-665	570	158
Typical power (hp)	1000	620	380	270-300	180-185	36
Example picture						
